= 1993 Newry and Mourne District Council election =

Local govt election in Northern Ireland

← 1989	19 May 1993	1997 →

All 30 seats to Newry and Mourne District Council 16 seats needed for a majority
	First party	Second party	Third party
Party	SDLP	UUP	Sinn Féin
Seats won	15	6	5
Seat change	▼2	0	▲1
	Fourth party	Fifth party	Sixth party
Party	Ind. Nationalist	DUP	Independent
Seats won	2	1	1
Seat change	0	▲1	▲1
	Seventh party
Party	Protestant Unionist
Seats won	0
Seat change	▼1
- Party with the most votes by district.

Elections to Newry and Mourne District Council were held on 19 May 1993 on the same day as the other Northern Irish local government elections. The election used five district electoral areas to elect a total of 30 councillors.

== Election results ==
Newry and Mourne District Council Election Result 1993
Party	Seats	Gains	Losses	Net gain/loss	Seats %	Votes %	Votes	+/−
SDLP	15	0	2	▼2	50.0	47.9	17,517	▼1.5
UUP	6	0	0	0	20.0	20.9	7,655	▲2.4
Sinn Féin	5	1	0	▲1	16.7	18.1	6,619	▲4.1
Ind. Nationalist	2	1	1	0	6.7	5.5	2,016	▲0.4
Independent	1	1	0	▲1	3.3	3.6	1,319	▼0.1
DUP	1	1	0	▲1	3.3	2.3	856	▼0.9
Workers' Party	0	0	0	0	0.0	1.0	381	▲0.1
Independent Labour	0	0	0	0	0.0	0.6	210	▲0.6

Note: "Votes" are the first preference votes.

== Districts summary ==
Results of the Newry and Mourne District Council election, 1993 by district
Ward	%	Cllrs	%	Cllrs	%	Cllrs	%	Cllrs	%	Cllrs	Total Cllrs
Ward	SDLP		UUP		Sinn Féin		DUP		Others		Total Cllrs
Crotlieve	58.6	4	12.1	1	4.8	0	0.0	0	24.5	2	7
Newry Town	43.7	3	11.2	1	22.8	2	0.0	0	22.3	1	7
Slieve Gullion	54.0	3	0.0	0	46.0	2	0.0	0	0.0	0	5
The Fews	44.7	3	36.5	2	18.8	1	0.0	0	0.0	0	6
The Mournes	36.8	2	46.8	2	3.6	0	12.8	1	0.0	0	5
Total	47.9	15	20.9	6	18.1	5	2.3	1	10.8	3	30

== District results ==
=== Crotlieve ===
1989: 5 x SDLP, 1 x UUP, 1 x Independent Nationalist
1993: 4 x SDLP, 2 x Independent Nationalist, 1 x UUP
1989-1993 Change: Independent Nationalist gain from SDLP

Crotlieve - 7 seats
Party	Candidate	FPv%	Count				
Party	Candidate	FPv%	1	2	3	4	5
SDLP	P. J. Bradley*	19.48%	1,698				
SDLP	Hugh Carr*	12.45%	1,085	1,330.31			
Ind. Nationalist	Anthony Williamson	12.13%	1,057	1,070.69	1,085.43	1,159.43	
Ind. Nationalist	Ciaran Mussen*	11.00%	959	980.46	1,000.05	1,124.05	
SDLP	Jim McCart*	9.51%	829	944.44	970.29	1,011.66	1,185.56
UUP	Gordon Heslip	12.14%	1,058	1,060.59	1,065.96	1,066.96	1,073.99
SDLP	Mary O'Hare	10.21%	890	949.94	976.23	1,014.71	1,035.8
SDLP	Brian Mulligan*	6.91%	602	723.36	732.69	782.17	810.29
Sinn Féin	Ann Marie Willis	4.83%	421	425.81	441.92		
Workers' Party	Raymond McEvoy	1.33%	116	135.24			
Electorate: 13,640 Valid: 8,715 (63.89%) Spoilt: 227 Quota: 1,090 Turnout: 8,942 (65.56%)

=== Newry Town ===
1989: 4 x SDLP, 1 x Sinn Féin, 1 x UUP, 1 x Independent Nationalist
1993: 3 x SDLP, 2 x Sinn Féin, 1 x UUP, 1 x Independent
1989-1993 Change: Sinn Féin and Independent gain from SDLP and Independent Nationalist

Newry Town - 7 seats
Party	Candidate	FPv%	Count					
Party	Candidate	FPv%	1	2	3	4	5	6
Sinn Féin	Davy Hyland	12.41%	997	1,002	1,015			
Independent	Jack Patterson	7.44%	598	621	650	800	1,019	
SDLP	Patrick McElroy*	10.33%	830	857	893	913	943	1,014
SDLP	Frank Feely*	8.49%	682	690	704	720	737	1,013
SDLP	Arthur Ruddy*	10.26%	824	841	850	874	932	982
Sinn Féin	Brendan Curran*	10.36%	832	849	863	893	933	958
UUP	William McCaigue*	11.24%	903	911	920	925	939	945
SDLP	Sean Gallogly*	7.94%	638	645	674	695	705	805
SDLP	Patrick Courtney	6.64%	533	542	554	578	601	
Independent	Richard Rodgers	4.92%	395	423	449	505		
Independent	James Markey	4.06%	326	339	384			
Workers' Party	Anthony Hutchinson	3.30%	265	277				
Independent Labour	Noel Sloan	2.61%	210					
Electorate: 13,701 Valid: 8,033 (58.63%) Spoilt: 296 Quota: 1,005 Turnout: 8,329 (60.79%)

=== Slieve Gullion ===
1989: 3 x SDLP, 2 x Sinn Féin
1993: 3 x SDLP, 2 x Sinn Féin
1989-1993 Change: No change

Slieve Gullion - 5 seats
Party	Candidate	FPv%	Count		
Party	Candidate	FPv%	1	2	3
SDLP	John Fee*	20.08%	1,227		
Sinn Féin	Jim McAllister*	17.77%	1,086		
Sinn Féin	Patrick McDonald	16.82%	1,028		
SDLP	Pat Toner*	14.15%	865	1,121	
SDLP	Terry Mulkerns	13.01%	795	885	1,061.75
Sinn Féin	Patrick Brennan	11.42%	698	718	743.75
SDLP	Michael McShane	6.74%	412		
Electorate: 9,214 Valid: 6,111 (66.32%) Spoilt: 208 Quota: 1,019 Turnout: 6,319 (68.58%)

=== The Fews ===
1989: 3 x SDLP, 2 x UUP, 1 x Sinn Féin
1993: 3 x SDLP, 2 x UUP, 1 x Sinn Féin
1989-1993 Change: No change

The Fews - 6 seats
Party	Candidate	FPv%	Count			
Party	Candidate	FPv%	1	2	3	4
UUP	Danny Kennedy*	25.17%	1,765			
SDLP	Stephen McGinn*	17.18%	1,205			
UUP	Arthur Lockhart	11.32%	794	1,541.56		
SDLP	James Savage*	13.68%	959	962.96	1,030.72	
SDLP	Charlie Smyth*	13.89%	974	977.96	1,028.12	
Sinn Féin	Conor Murphy*	10.85%	761	761.44	762.32	907.87
Sinn Féin	Jimmy McCreesh	7.90%	554	554.44	556.64	613.44
Electorate: 10,399 Valid: 7,012 (67.43%) Spoilt: 270 Quota: 1,002 Turnout: 7,282 (70.03%)

=== The Mournes ===
1989: 2 x UUP, 2 x SDLP, 1 x Protestant Unionist
1993: 2 x UUP, 2 x SDLP, 1 x DUP
1989-1993 Change: DUP gain from Protestant Unionist

The Mournes - 5 seats
Party	Candidate	FPv%	Count		
Party	Candidate	FPv%	1	2	3
UUP	Henry Reilly*	24.57%	1,647		
UUP	Isaac Hanna	22.20%	1,488		
SDLP	Emmett Haughian*	22.13%	1,483		
DUP	William Burns	12.77%	856	1,371.55	
SDLP	Austin Crawford*	14.71%	986	997.2	1,198.2
Sinn Féin	Michael McAleenan	3.61%	242	242.35	245.35
Electorate: 9,729 Valid: 6,702 (68.89%) Spoilt: 191 Quota: 1,118 Turnout: 6,893 (70.85%)
