= 1997 Newry and Mourne District Council election =

Local govt election in Northern Ireland

← 1993	21 May 1997	2001 →

All 30 seats to Newry and Mourne District Council 16 seats needed for a majority
	First party	Second party	Third party
Party	SDLP	Sinn Féin	UUP
Seats won	12	8	5
Seat change	▼3	▲3	▼1
	Fourth party	Fifth party	Sixth party
Party	Ind. Nationalist	DUP	Independent
Seats won	3	1	1
Seat change	▲1	0	0
- Results by district electoral area, shaded by First Preference Votes.

Elections to Newry and Mourne District Council were held on 21 May 1997 on the same day as the other Northern Irish local government elections. The election used five district electoral areas to elect a total of 30 councillors.

== Election results ==
Newry and Mourne District Council Election Result 1997
Party	Seats	Gains	Losses	Net gain/loss	Seats %	Votes %	Votes	+/−
SDLP	12	0	3	▼3	40.0	39.5	14,590	▼8.4
Sinn Féin	8	3	0	▲3	26.7	26.7	9,874	▲8.6
UUP	5	0	1	▼1	16.7	19.2	7,080	▼1.7
Ind. Nationalist	3	1	0	▲1	10.0	6.9	2,542	▲1.4
Independent	1	0	0	0	3.3	3.1	1,132	▼0.5
DUP	1	0	0	0	3.3	2.5	907	▲0.2
Alliance	0	0	0	0	0.0	2.0	753	▲2.0
Workers' Party	0	0	0	0	0.0	0.2	78	▼0.8

Note: "Votes" are the first preference votes.

== Districts summary ==
Results of the Newry and Mourne District Council election, 1997 by district
Ward	%	Cllrs	%	Cllrs	%	Cllrs	%	Cllrs	%	Cllrs	Total Cllrs
Ward	SDLP		Sinn Féin		UUP		DUP		Others		Total Cllrs
Crotlieve	51.0	4	16.8	1	10.6	0	0.0	0	21.6	2	7
Newry Town	32.1	2	32.4	2	9.1	1	0.0	0	26.4	2	7
Slieve Gullion	46.3	2	53.7	3	0.0	0	0.0	0	0.0	0	5
The Fews	37.1	2	27.5	2	35.4	2	0.0	0	0.0	0	6
The Mournes	30.4	2	6.8	0	42.0	2	13.1	1	7.7	0	5
Total	39.5	12	26.7	8	19.2	5	2.5	1	12.1	4	30

== District results ==
=== Crotlieve ===
1993: 4 x SDLP, 2 x Independent Nationalist, 1 x UUP
1997: 4 x SDLP, 2 x Independent Nationalist, 1 x Sinn Féin
1993–1997 Change: Sinn Féin gain from UUP

Crotlieve - 7 seats
Party	Candidate	FPv%	Count						
Party	Candidate	FPv%	1	2	3	4	5	6	7
SDLP	P. J. Bradley*	17.77%	1,503						
Sinn Féin	Mick Murphy	16.82%	1,423						
SDLP	Hugh Carr*	11.52%	975	1,154.4					
Ind. Nationalist	Anthony Williamson*	10.18%	861	873.6	965.67	1,034.45	1,116.45		
SDLP	Josephine O'Hare	9.01%	762	837.6	891.85	914.54	1,058.97		
SDLP	Jim McCart*	8.46%	716	775.7	817.86	852.06	1,059.15		
Ind. Nationalist	Ciaran Mussen*	8.89%	752	770.3	857.1	885.49	909.15	955.65	977.65
UUP	Gordon Heslip*	10.56%	893	894.2	895.13	920.75	925.35	930.75	932.75
SDLP	Marietta Farrell	4.21%	356	437.3	503.02	536.97			
Alliance	Lindsay Whitcroft	2.59%	219	226.2	239.22				
Electorate: 14,584 Valid: 8,460 (58.01%) Spoilt: 210 Quota: 1,058 Turnout: 8,670 (59.45%)

=== Newry Town ===
1993: 3 x SDLP, 2 x Sinn Féin, 1 x UUP, 1 x Independent
1997: 2 x SDLP, 2 x Sinn Féin, 1 x UUP, 1 x Independent, 1 x Independent Nationalist
1993–1997 Change: Independent Nationalist gain from SDLP

Newry Town - 7 seats
Party	Candidate	FPv%	Count				
Party	Candidate	FPv%	1	2	3	4	5
Sinn Féin	Davy Hyland*	13.53%	1,095				
Independent	Jack Patterson*	12.73%	1,030				
Sinn Féin	Brendan Curran*	12.36%	1,000	1,004	1,024.93		
SDLP	Frank Feely*	9.57%	774	795	796.05	1,034.05	
Ind. Nationalist	Eugene Markey	11.48%	929	948	951.5	976.78	1,061.78
SDLP	Patrick McElroy*	9.97%	807	830	833.15	979.22	1,012.22
UUP	William McCaigue*	8.99%	727	763	763.35	768.35	771.98
SDLP	Arthur Ruddy*	6.53%	528	555	556.05	633.26	654.13
Sinn Féin	Anne Marie Willis	6.54%	529	530	572.7	578.98	
SDLP	Mary McKeown	6.07%	491	521	522.33		
Alliance	Pete Whitcroft	2.24%	181				
Electorate: 14,036 Valid: 8,091 (57.64%) Spoilt: 213 Quota: 1,012 Turnout: 8,304 (59.16%)

=== Slieve Gullion ===
1993: 3 x SDLP, 2 x Sinn Féin
1997: 3 x Sinn Féin, 2 x SDLP
1993–1997 Change: Sinn Féin gain from SDLP

Slieve Gullion - 5 seats
Party	Candidate	FPv%	Count	
Party	Candidate	FPv%	1	2
SDLP	John Fee*	22.51%	1,412	
Sinn Féin	Patrick Brennan	18.30%	1,148	
Sinn Féin	Patrick McDonald*	17.76%	1,114	
Sinn Féin	Patrick McNamee	17.66%	1,108	
SDLP	Pat Toner*	13.47%	845	1,043.8
SDLP	Dessie McDonnell	10.31%	647	804.36
Electorate: 9,847 Valid: 6,274 (63.71%) Spoilt: 174 Quota: 1,046 Turnout: 6,448 (65.48%)

=== The Fews ===
1993: 3 x SDLP, 2 x UUP, 1 x Sinn Féin
1997: 2 x SDLP, 2 x UUP, 2 x Sinn Féin
1993–1997 Change: Sinn Féin gain from SDLP

The Fews - 6 seats
Party	Candidate	FPv%	Count		
Party	Candidate	FPv%	1	2	3
UUP	Danny Kennedy*	22.27%	1,610		
Sinn Féin	Brendan Lewis	15.25%	1,103		
UUP	Andy Moffett	13.17%	952	1,510.72	
SDLP	Stephen McGinn*	14.08%	1,018	1,022.68	1,055.8
SDLP	Charlie Smyth*	13.48%	975	976.44	1,035.84
Sinn Féin	Jimmy McCreesh	12.21%	883	884.08	885.52
SDLP	James Savage*	6.69%	690	691.44	746.88
Electorate: 10,907 Valid: 7,231 (66.30%) Spoilt: 219 Quota: 1,034 Turnout: 7,450 (68.30%)

=== The Mournes ===
1993: 2 x UUP, 2 x SDLP, 1 x DUP
1997: 2 x UUP, 2 x SDLP, 1 x DUP
1993–1997 Change: No change

The Mournes - 5 seats
Party	Candidate	FPv%	Count						
Party	Candidate	FPv%	1	2	3	4	5	6	7
UUP	Isaac Hanna*	23.12%	1,595						
UUP	Henry Reilly*	18.88%	1,303						
SDLP	Emmett Haughian*	17.33%	1,196						
DUP	William Burns*	13.14%	907	1,266.89					
SDLP	Michael Cunningham	12.97%	895	898.48	901.47	903.99	931.28	939.18	1,193.18
Alliance	Anne Marie Cunningham	5.12%	353	390.7	423.82	449.65	470.61	569.66	657.95
Sinn Féin	Paul Lawless	6.83%	471	471.58	471.58	471.58	481.58	482.58	
Independent	Cecil Atkinson	1.48%	102	133.9	238.09	321.25	326.95		
Workers' Party	Charles Cunningham	1.13%	78	81.77	89.59	93.37			
Electorate: 10,084 Valid: 6,900 (68.43%) Spoilt: 127 Quota: 1,151 Turnout: 7,027 (69.68%)
