= 2001 Newry and Mourne District Council election =

Local govt election in Northern Ireland

← 1997	7 June 2001	2005 →

All 30 seats to Newry and Mourne District Council 16 seats needed for a majority
	First party	Second party	Third party
Party	Sinn Féin	SDLP	UUP
Seats won	13	10	4
Seat change	▲5	▼2	▼1
	Fourth party	Fifth party	Sixth party
Party	Independent	DUP	Ind. Nationalist
Seats won	2	1	0
Seat change	▲1	0	▼3
- Party with the most votes by district.

Elections to Newry and Mourne District Council were held on 7 June 2001 on the same day as the other Northern Irish local government elections. The election used five district electoral areas to elect a total of 30 councillors.

== Election results ==
Newry and Mourne District Council Election Result 2001
Party	Seats	Gains	Losses	Net gain/loss	Seats %	Votes %	Votes	+/−
Sinn Féin	13	5	0	▲5	43.3	39.2	17,869	▲12.5
SDLP	10	1	3	▼2	33.3	35.5	16,186	▼4.0
UUP	4	0	1	▼1	13.3	12.6	5,745	▼6.6
Independent	2	1	0	▲1	6.7	6.3	2,844	▲3.2
DUP	1	0	0	0	3.3	6.4	2,922	▲3.9

Note: "Votes" are the first preference votes.

== Districts summary ==
Results of the Newry and Mourne District Council election, 2001 by district
Ward	%	Cllrs	%	Cllrs	%	Cllrs	%	Cllrs	%	Cllrs	Total Cllrs
Ward	Sinn Féin		SDLP		UUP		DUP		Others		Total Cllrs
Crotlieve	26.4	2	51.0	4	6.2	0	2.4	0	14.0	1	7
Newry Town	45.5	3	33.7	3	7.6	0	0.0	0	13.2	1	7
Slieve Gullion	68.1	4	31.9	1	0.0	0	0.0	0	0.0	0	5
The Fews	41.6	3	28.6	1	22.0	2	7.8	0	0.0	0	6
The Mournes	16.8	1	27.1	1	30.7	2	25.4	1	0.0	0	5
Total	39.2	13	35.5	10	12.6	4	6.4	1	6.3	2	30

== District results ==
=== Crotlieve ===
1997: 4 x SDLP, 2 x Independent Nationalist, 1 x Sinn Féin
2001: 4 x SDLP, 2 x Sinn Féin, 1 x Independent
1997-2001 Change: Sinn Féin gain from Independent Nationalist, Independent Nationalist becomes Independent

Crotlieve - 7 seats
Party	Candidate	FPv%	Count							
Party	Candidate	FPv%	1	2	3	4	5	6	7	8
SDLP	P. J. Bradley*	18.63%	2,103							
Sinn Féin	Mick Murphy*	15.44%	1,743							
SDLP	Hugh Carr*	10.53%	1,189	1,455.56						
SDLP	Josephine O'Hare*	10.41%	1,175	1,397.02	1,421.91					
SDLP	Michael Carr	6.32%	714	761.6	772.62	774.96	806.81	833.75	1,188.53	1,364.72
Sinn Féin	Michael Ruane	7.15%	807	814.48	865.59	865.78	866.38	1,311.46	1,350.39	1,351.39
Independent	Anthony Williamson*	6.65%	751	765.96	777.93	781.93	782.48	842.62	1,022.7	1,161.7
Independent	Ciaran Mussen*	7.39%	834	854.74	877.73	884.73	885.43	896.89	947.89	1,056.57
UUP	John McConnell	6.17%	697	699.72	700.1	907.78	907.98	907.98	913.03	
SDLP	Brendan Murney	5.10%	576	661.34	673.5	674.5	677.15	729.21		
Sinn Féin	Eamonn O'Connor	3.79%	428	448.4	635.36	637.36	638.36			
DUP	Ruth McConnell	2.43%	274	275.02	275.21					
Electorate: 15,786 Valid: 11,291 (71.53%) Spoilt: 324 Quota: 1,412 Turnout: 11,615 (73.56%)

=== Newry Town ===
1997: 2 x Sinn Féin, 2 x SDLP, 1 x UUP, 1 x Independent, 1 x Independent Nationalist
2001: 3 x Sinn Féin, 3 x SDLP, 1 x Independent
1997-2001 Change: Sinn Féin and SDLP gain from UUP and Independent Nationalist

Newry Town - 7 seats
Party	Candidate	FPv%	Count					
Party	Candidate	FPv%	1	2	3	4	5	6
Sinn Féin	Davy Hyland*	12.73%	1,213					
Independent	Jack Patterson*	12.07%	1,150	1,230				
SDLP	Patrick McElroy*	9.97%	950	1,108	1,265			
SDLP	Frank Feely*	9.86%	940	1,134	1,228			
Sinn Féin	Charlie Casey	11.74%	1,119	1,125	1,131	1,131	1,134.65	1,136.03
SDLP	John McArdle	8.51%	811	910	973	1,040.15	1,069.35	1,102.47
Sinn Féin	Brendan Curran*	10.75%	1,025	1,049	1,054	1,054.85	1,056.31	1,057
Sinn Féin	Conor Murphy	10.32%	984	1,005	1,011	1,015.25	1,018.9	1,019.59
UUP	William McCaigue*	7.63%	727	735				
SDLP	Peter McEvoy	5.28%	503					
Independent	Declan O'Callaghan	1.14%	109					
Electorate: 13,657 Valid: 9,531 (69.79%) Spoilt: 265 Quota: 1,192 Turnout: 9,796 (71.73%)

=== Slieve Gullion ===
1997: 3 x Sinn Féin, 2 x SDLP
2001: 4 x Sinn Féin, 1 x SDLP
1997-2001 Change: No change

Slieve Gullion - 5 seats
Party	Candidate	FPv%	Count				
Party	Candidate	FPv%	1	2	3	4	5
Sinn Féin	Elena Martin	17.58%	1,436				
Sinn Féin	Colman Burns	17.52%	1,431				
Sinn Féin	Patrick McDonald*	17.32%	1,415				
Sinn Féin	Terry Hearty	15.71%	1,283	1,292	1,347.6	1,397.08	
SDLP	John Fee*	14.63%	1,195	1,318	1,321.35	1,326.11	1,347.04
SDLP	Pat Toner*	10.28%	840	1,253	1,260.1	1,261.7	1,291.99
SDLP	Mary McKeown	6.95%	568				
Electorate: 10,524 Valid: 8,168 (77.61%) Spoilt: 273 Quota: 1,362 Turnout: 8,441 (80.21%)

=== The Fews ===
1997: 2 x Sinn Féin, 2 x UUP, 2 x SDLP
2001: 3 x Sinn Féin, 2 x UUP, 1 x SDLP
1997-2001 Change: Sinn Féin gain from SDLP

The Fews - 6 seats
Party	Candidate	FPv%	Count					
Party	Candidate	FPv%	1	2	3	4	5	6
Sinn Féin	Jimmy McCreesh*	14.39%	1,279					
Sinn Féin	Patrick McGinn	13.98%	1,243	1,279				
SDLP	John Feehan	12.05%	1,071	1,271				
UUP	Danny Kennedy*	13.85%	1,231	1,233	1,608			
UUP	Andy Moffett*	8.18%	727	740	968	1,300.76		
Sinn Féin	Brendan Lewis*	13.18%	1,172	1,198	1,198	1,199.88	1,199.88	1,199.88
SDLP	Charlie Smyth*	9.89%	879	1,158	1,160	1,160.94	1,190.44	1,190.44
DUP	Craig Baxter	7.80%	693	694				
SDLP	Angela Savage	6.69%	595					
Electorate: 11,457 Valid: 8,890 (77.59%) Spoilt: 231 Quota: 1,271 Turnout: 9,121 (79.61%)

=== The Mournes ===
1997: 2 x UUP, 2 x SDLP, 1 x DUP
2001: 2 x UUP, 1 x SDLP, 1 x DUP, 1 x Sinn Féin
1997-2001 Change: No change

The Mournes - 5 seats
Party	Candidate	FPv%	Count			
Party	Candidate	FPv%	1	2	3	4
DUP	William Burns*	24.00%	1,845			
Sinn Féin	Martin Cunningham	16.80%	1,291			
UUP	Isaac Hanna*	15.33%	1,178	1,219	1,520.08	
UUP	Henry Reilly*	15.42%	1,185	1,209	1,455.87	
SDLP	Michael Cole	15.68%	1,205	1,208	1,213.85	1,245.83
SDLP	Marian Fitzpatrick	11.35%	872	874	875.56	893.5
DUP	Linda Burns	1.43%	110			
Electorate: 10,440 Valid: 7,686 (73.62%) Spoilt: 170 Quota: 1,282 Turnout: 7,856 (75.25%)
