= 1989 Newry and Mourne District Council election =

Local govt election in Northern Ireland

← 1985	17 May 1989	1993 →

All 30 seats to Newry and Mourne District Council 16 seats needed for a majority
	First party	Second party	Third party
Party	SDLP	UUP	Sinn Féin
Seats won	17	6	4
Seat change	▲3	▼1	▼1
	Fourth party	Fifth party	Sixth party
Party	Ind. Nationalist	Protestant Unionist	DUP
Seats won	2	1	0
Seat change	▲1	▲1	▼2
	Seventh party
Party	Irish Independence
Seats won	0
Seat change	▼1

Elections to Newry and Mourne District Council were held on 17 May 1989 on the same day as the other Northern Irish local government elections. The election used five district electoral areas to elect a total of 30 councillors.

== Election results ==
Newry and Mourne District Council Election Result 1989
Party	Seats	Gains	Losses	Net gain/loss	Seats %	Votes %	Votes	+/−
SDLP	17	3	0	▲3	56.7	49.4	18,805	▲8.5
UUP	6	0	1	▼1	20.0	18.5	7,032	▼1.7
Sinn Féin	4	0	1	▼1	13.3	14.0	5,336	▼4.5
Ind. Nationalist	2	1	0	▲1	6.7	5.6	2,142	▲3.0
Protestant Unionist	1	1	0	▲1	3.3	4.6	1,754	▲4.6
DUP	0	0	2	▼2	0.0	3.2	1,203	▼4.6
Independent	0	0	0	0	3.3	3.1	1,197	▲0.6
Workers' Party	0	0	0	0	0.0	0.9	360	▼0.6
Ind. Republican	0	0	0	0	0.0	0.5	208	▼0.1

Note: "Votes" are the first preference votes.

== Districts summary ==
Results of the Newry and Mourne District Council election, 1989 by district
Ward	%	Cllrs	%	Cllrs	%	Cllrs	%	Cllrs	Total Cllrs
Ward	SDLP		UUP		Sinn Féin		Others		Total Cllrs
Crotlieve	64.5	5	20.8	1	4.2	0	10.5	1	7
Newry Town	47.2	4	10.4	1	14.6	1	27.8	1	7
Slieve Gullion	57.1	3	0.0	0	39.4	2	3.5	0	5
The Fews	43.5	3	31.9	2	15.4	1	9.2	0	6
The Mournes	32.4	2	26.0	2	3.1	0	38.5	1	5
Total	49.4	17	18.5	6	14.0	4	18.1	3	30

== District results ==
=== Crotlieve ===
1985: 4 x SDLP, 2 x UUP, 1 x Independent Nationalist
1989: 5 x SDLP, 1 x UUP, 1 x Independent Nationalist
1985-1989 Change: SDLP gain from UUP

Crotlieve - 7 seats
Party	Candidate	FPv%	Count				
Party	Candidate	FPv%	1	2	3	4	5
SDLP	P. J. Bradley*	16.32%	1,488				
UUP	Violet Cromie*	15.11%	1,378				
SDLP	Hugh Carr	11.85%	1,081	1,183.81			
Ind. Nationalist	Ciaran Mussen*	10.46%	954	971.94	974.15	1,109.61	1,274.61
SDLP	Patrick Maginn	8.40%	766	818.9	819.92	849.15	1,153.15
SDLP	Jim McCart*	10.89%	993	1,054.87	1,055.72	1,080.87	1,121.77
SDLP	Brian Mulligan*	10.94%	998	1,081.49	1,081.66	1,120.81	1,151.81
UUP	John Fisher	5.65%	515	516.38	742.82	742.82	743.82
SDLP	Felix O'Hare	6.11%	557	566.43	566.43	602.89	
Sinn Féin	Ann Marie Willis	4.27%	389	392.91	392.91		
Electorate: 13,264 Valid: 9,119 (68.75%) Spoilt: 256 Quota: 1,140 Turnout: 9,375 (70.68%)

=== Newry Town ===
1985: 4 x SDLP, 1 x Sinn Féin, 1 x UUP, 1 x IIP
1989: 4 x SDLP, 1 x Sinn Féin, 1 x UUP, 1 x Independent Nationalist
1985-1989 Change: Independent Nationalist leaves IIP

Newry Town - 7 seats
Party	Candidate	FPv%	Count											
Party	Candidate	FPv%	1	2	3	4	5	6	7	8	9	10	11	12
Ind. Nationalist	Eugene Markey*	11.71%	973	974	1,006	1,039								
Sinn Féin	Brendan Curran*	8.92%	741	741	755	766	770	802	817	1,219				
SDLP	Arthur Ruddy*	10.74%	892	894	907	921	937	975	990	995	1,137			
SDLP	Frank Feely	11.52%	957	961	963	981	995	1,004	1,017	1,023	1,099			
SDLP	Sean Gallogly*	9.84%	818	821	826	837	877	882	905	911	1,023	1,045		
SDLP	Patrick McElroy*	7.39%	614	618	623	627	688	699	722	727	828	840	933.45	988.55
UUP	William McCaigue*	10.41%	865	865	869	871	871	873	882	882	886	888	888.89	889.84
Independent	Louis Morgan	6.44%	535	538	554	569	586	627	687	711	742	821	823.67	827.47
SDLP	John McArdle	5.30%	440	447	450	455	492	499	511	517				
Sinn Féin	Eileen Morgan	5.66%	470	470	473	476	480	484	495					
Workers' Party	Kevin Morgan	3.18%	264	264	271	275	279	295						
Ind. Nationalist	James McKevitt	2.59%	215	217	219	232	236							
SDLP	Teddy McLoughlin	2.43%	202	202	204	206								
Independent	Peter McKevitt	1.84%	153	161	165									
Independent	Noel Sloan	1.61%	134	135										
Independent	Patrick Ruddy	0.43%	36											
Electorate: 13,812 Valid: 8,309 (60.16%) Spoilt: 321 Quota: 1,039 Turnout: 8,630 (62.48%)

=== Slieve Gullion ===
1985: 3 x SDLP, 2 x Sinn Féin
1989: 3 x SDLP, 2 x Sinn Féin
1985-1989 Change: No change

Slieve Gullion - 5 seats
Party	Candidate	FPv%	Count			
Party	Candidate	FPv%	1	2	3	4
SDLP	John Fee	20.41%	1,207			
SDLP	Pat Toner*	19.85%	1,174			
Sinn Féin	Jim McAllister*	17.50%	1,035			
SDLP	Michael O'Neill	16.82%	995			
Sinn Féin	Jimmy McCreesh	12.78%	756	825.16	855.52	928.92
Sinn Féin	Patrick McDonald	9.13%	540	551.44	592.8	623.8
Ind. Republican	Brian Woods	3.52%	208	347.88	464.04	
Electorate: 8,845 Valid: 5,915 (66.87%) Spoilt: 292 Quota: 986 Turnout: 6,207 (70.18%)

=== The Fews ===
1985: 3 x SDLP, 2 x UUP, 1 x Sinn Féin
1989: 2 x SDLP, 2 x UUP, 1 x Sinn Féin, 1 x DUP
1985-1989 Change: SDLP gain from DUP

The Fews - 6 seats
Party	Candidate	FPv%	Count				
Party	Candidate	FPv%	1	2	3	4	5
UUP	Danny Kennedy*	18.19%	1,406				
SDLP	Stephen McGinn	14.98%	1,158				
SDLP	James Savage*	14.27%	1,103	1,124			
SDLP	Charlie Smyth	14.27%	1,103	1,111			
UUP	Andy Moffett*	13.66%	1,056	1,079	1,350.74		
Sinn Féin	Conor Murphy	9.12%	705	713	713.21	713.21	1,126.21
DUP	Gordon Heslip*	7.95%	614	615	635.58	878.38	878.38
Sinn Féin	Patrick Quinn	6.30%	487	491	491	491	
Workers' Party	Brian Mulligan	1.24%	96				
Electorate: 10,545 Valid: 7,728 (73.29%) Spoilt: 223 Quota: 1,105 Turnout: 7,951 (75.40%)

=== The Mournes ===
1985: 2 x UUP, 1 x SDLP, 1 x DUP, 1 x Sinn Féin
1989: 2 x UUP, 2 x SDLP, 1 x Protestant Unionist
1985-1989 Change: SDLP gain from Sinn Féin, Protestant Unionist leaves DUP

The Mournes - 5 seats
Party	Candidate	FPv%	Count				
Party	Candidate	FPv%	1	2	3	4	5
Protestant Unionist	George Graham*	25.18%	1,754				
SDLP	Emmett Haughian	18.79%	1,309				
UUP	Henry Reilly	16.91%	1,178				
SDLP	Austin Crawford	13.64%	950	952.38	1,078.88	1,443.88	
UUP	Arthur Coulter*	9.10%	634	911.1	911.76	927.78	947.78
DUP	George McConnell	8.46%	589	890.58	890.69	893.92	897.92
Independent	Mark Brennan	4.87%	339	341.04	349.62		
Sinn Féin	Gabriel Curran	3.06%	213	213.34	218.29		
Electorate: 9,812 Valid: 6,966 (70.99%) Spoilt: 184 Quota: 1,162 Turnout: 7,150 (72.87%)
