= Crotlieve (District Electoral Area) =

District electoral area in Northern Ireland

- Newry, Mourne and Down District Council DEA constituency

Current constituency
- Created: 1985
- Seats: 7 (1985-2014); 6 (2014-)
- Councillors: Mark Gibbons (IND); Declan McAleer (SDLP); Kate Murphy (SF); Selina Murphy (SF); Mickey Ruane (SF); Jarlath Tinnelly (IND)

Crotlieve DEA within Newry, Mourne and Down

Crotlieve DEA (1993-2014) within Newry and Mourne

Crotlieve is one of the seven district electoral areas (DEA) in Newry, Mourne and Down, Northern Ireland. The district elects six members to Newry, Mourne and Down District Council and contains the wards of Burren, Derryleckagh, Hilltown, Mayobridge, Rostrevor and Warrenpoint. Crotlieve forms part of the South Down constituencies for the Northern Ireland Assembly and UK Parliament.

It was created for the 1985 local elections, replacing Newry and Mourne Areas B and C which had existed since 1973, where it originally contained seven wards (Ballycrossan, Clonallan, Mayobridge, Rathfriland, Rostrevor, Seaview, Spelga). For the 1993 local elections Rathfriland moved to the Knockiveagh DEA while Crotlieve gained Burren and Kilbroney. For the 2014 local elections it was reduced by one ward, gaining Hilltown but losing Seaview and Spelga.

== Councillors ==
Election	Councillor (Party)	Councillor (Party)	Councillor (Party)	Councillor (Party)	Councillor (Party)	Councillor (Party)	Councillor (Party)
2023	Jarlath Tinnelly (Independent)	Mark Gibbons (Independent)	Declan McAleer (SDLP)	Selina Murphy (Sinn Féin)	Kate Murphy (Sinn Féin)	Mickey Ruane (Sinn Féin)	6 seats 2014–present
2019	Jarlath Tinnelly (Independent)	Mark Gibbons (Independent)	Declan McAleer (SDLP)	Karen McKevitt (SDLP)	Gerry O'Hare (Sinn Féin)	Mickey Ruane (Sinn Féin)	6 seats 2014–present
April 2017 Co-Option	Jarlath Tinnelly (Independent)	Michael Carr (SDLP)	Declan McAleer (SDLP)	Gillian Fitzpatrick (SDLP)	Oksana McMahon (Sinn Féin)	Mickey Ruane (Sinn Féin)	6 seats 2014–present
2014	Jarlath Tinnelly (Independent)	Michael Carr (SDLP)	Declan McAleer (SDLP)	Gillian Fitzpatrick (SDLP)	Sinead Ennis (Sinn Féin)	Mickey Ruane (Sinn Féin)	6 seats 2014–present
2011	Sean O'Hare (SDLP)	Michael Carr (SDLP)	Declan McAleer (SDLP)	Connaire McGreevey (SDLP)	Peter Kearney (Sinn Féin)	Mickey Ruane (Sinn Féin)	Mick Murphy (Sinn Féin)
2005	Ciaran Mussen (Green Party)	Michael Carr (SDLP)	Karen McKevitt (SDLP)	Josephine O'Hare (SDLP)	Anthony Williamson (Independent Nationalist)	Mickey Ruane (Sinn Féin)	Mick Murphy (Sinn Féin)
2001	P. J. Bradley (SDLP)	Michael Carr (SDLP)	Hugh Carr (SDLP)	Josephine O'Hare (SDLP)	Anthony Williamson (Independent Nationalist)	Mickey Ruane (Sinn Féin)	Mick Murphy (Sinn Féin)
1997	P. J. Bradley (SDLP)	Jim McCart (SDLP)	Hugh Carr (SDLP)	Josephine O'Hare (SDLP)	Anthony Williamson (Independent Nationalist)	Ciaran Mussen (Independent Nationalist)	Mick Murphy (Sinn Féin)
1993	P. J. Bradley (SDLP)	Jim McCart (SDLP)	Hugh Carr (SDLP)	Mary O'Hare (SDLP)	Anthony Williamson (Independent Nationalist)	Ciaran Mussen (Independent Nationalist)	Gordon Heslip (UUP)
1989	P. J. Bradley (SDLP)	Jim McCart (SDLP)	Hugh Carr (SDLP)	Brian Mulligan (SDLP)	Patrick Maginn (SDLP)	Ciaran Mussen (Independent Nationalist)	Violet Cromie (UUP)
1985	P. J. Bradley (SDLP)	Jim McCart (SDLP)	Patrick Harper (SDLP)	Brian Mulligan (SDLP)	William McCoy (UUP)	Ciaran Mussen (Independent Nationalist)	Violet Cromie (UUP)

== 2023 Election ==
2019: 2 x Sinn Féin, 2 x SDLP, 2 x Independent

2023: 3 x Sinn Féin, 2 x Independent, 1 x SDLP

2019–2023 Change: Sinn Féin gain from SDLP

Crotlieve - 6 seats
Party	Candidate	FPv%	Count									
Party	Candidate	FPv%	1	2	3	4	5	6	7	8	9	10
Sinn Féin	Selina Murphy	14.20%	1,863	1,879.00								
SDLP	Declan McAteer*	9.40%	1,233	1,310.00	1,324.00	1,473.00	1,577.00	1,683.00	1,683.25	2,507.25		
Independent	Mark Gibbons*	8.47%	1,111	1,143.00	1,150.00	1,242.00	1,610.00	1,721.00	1,721.75	1,793.75	1,888.75	
Sinn Féin	Kate Murphy	10.65%	1,397	1,402.00	1,403.00	1,453.00	1,491.00	1,493.00	1,494.50	1,611.50	1,771.50	1,774.62
Sinn Féin	Mickey Ruane*	10.57%	1,387	1,413.00	1,413.00	1,446.00	1,570.00	1,574.00	1,575.00	1,618.00	1,669.00	1,670.04
Independent	Jarlath Tinnelly*	7.95%	1,043	1,059.00	1,063.00	1,142.00	1,252.00	1,306.00	1,306.25	1,367.25	1,504.25	1,513.35
Sinn Féin	Gerry O'Hare*	10.25%	1,345	1,350.00	1,350.00	1,376.00	1,389.00	1,391.00	1,391.00	1,447.00	1,512.00	1,512.26
SDLP	Karen McKevitt*	6.94%	911	948.00	964.00	1,130.00	1,189.00	1,305.00	1,305.25			
DUP	Keith Parke	4.57%	600	603.00	946.00	957.00	965.00					
Independent	Jim Boylan	6.24%	818	841.00	850.00	926.00						
Alliance	Daniel Neary	5.03%	660	710.00	742.00							
UUP	Ricky McGaffin	3.42%	448	451.00								
SDLP	Anne Sheridan	1.40%	183									
Green (NI)	Hugh O'Reilly	0.73%	96									
Independent	Finbarr Lambe	0.18%	23									
Electorate: 21,313 Valid: 13,118 (61.55%) Spoilt: 140 Quota: 1,875 Turnout: 13,258 (62.21%)

== 2019 Election ==
2014: 3 x SDLP, 2 x Sinn Féin, 1 x Independent

2019: 2 x SDLP, 2 x Sinn Féin, 2 x Independent

2014-2019 Change: Independent gain from SDLP

Crotlieve - 6 seats
Party	Candidate	FPv%	Count								
Party	Candidate	FPv%	1	2	3	4	5	6	7	8	9
Independent	Jarlath Tinnelly*	12.30%	1,412	1,415	1,465	1,528	1,651				
Sinn Féin	Gerry O'Hare	11.20%	1,286	1,286	1,305	1,462	1,467	1,852			
SDLP	Declan McAteer*	10.24%	1,175	1,179	1,236	1,247	1,309	1,371	1,375.56	1,375.56	1,754.56
Independent	Mark Gibbons	10.36%	1,189	1,191	1,257	1,269	1,586	1,599	1,600.71	1,607.71	1,703.71
Sinn Féin	Mickey Ruane*	7.07%	812	812	822	963	1,039	1,396	1,590.94	1,593.64	1,687.64
SDLP	Karen McKevitt	9.72%	1,116	1,117	1,203	1,232	1,259	1,337	1,340.42	1,340.42	1,641.42
UUP	Joshua Lowry	6.20%	712	1,056	1,068	1,068	1,079	1,079	1,079	1,079	1,100.9
SDLP	Michael Carr	7.00%	808	810	877	880	1,055	1,073	1,075.85	1,075.85	
Sinn Féin	Oksana McMahon*	7.04%	809	809	823	922	940				
Independent	Jim Boylan	6.86%	788	789	853	856					
Sinn Féin	Mary Tinnelly	4.52%	519	519	524						
Alliance	Lorcán McGreevy	4.21%	483	484							
DUP	Wilma McCullough	3.23%	371								
Electorate: 19,863 Valid: 11,480 (57.80%) Spoilt: 169 Quota: 1,641 Turnout: 11,649 (58.65%)

== 2014 Election ==
2011: 4 x SDLP, 3 x Sinn Féin

2014: 3 x SDLP, 2 x Sinn Féin, 1 x Independent

2011-2014 Change: SDLP and Sinn Féin loss to Independent and due to the reduction of one seat

Crotlieve - 6 seats
Party	Candidate	FPv%	Count							
Party	Candidate	FPv%	1	2	3	4	5	6	7	8
SDLP	Declan McAteer*	14.19%	1,389	1,403						
SDLP	Michael Carr*	10.30%	1,008	1,068	1,401					
Sinn Féin	Sinead Ennis* †	13.57%	1,328	1,333	1,344	1,344.4	1,344.9	1,812.9		
Sinn Féin	Mickey Ruane*	12.21%	1,195	1,232	1,286	1,286.4	1,286.9	1,519.9		
SDLP	Gillian Fitzpatrick*	11.21%	1,097	1,109	1,289	1,290.6	1,290.6	1,337.6	1,431.6	
Independent	Jarlath Tinnelly	7.56%	740	856	941	941.8	942.8	1,067.8	1,149.8	1,230.8
UUP	William Mitchell	9.53%	933	1,136	1,143	1,143.8	1,143.8	1,149.8	1,150.8	1,155.8
Sinn Féin	Mark Gibbons	8.76%	858	867	941	941	941			
SDLP	Connaire McGreevy*	7.73%	757	771						
Independent	Finbarr Lambe	2.64%	258							
DUP	Wilma McCullough	2.31%	226							
Electorate: 18,279 Valid: 9,789 (53.55%) Spoilt: 148 Quota: 1,399 Turnout: 9,937 (54.36%)

== 2011 Election ==
2005: 3 x SDLP, 2 x Sinn Féin, 1 x Green, 1 x Independent

2011: 4 x SDLP, 3 x Sinn Féin

2005-2011 Change: SDLP and Sinn Féin gain from Green and Independent

Crotlieve - 7 seats
Party	Candidate	FPv%	Count				
Party	Candidate	FPv%	1	2	3	4	5
Sinn Féin	Michael Ruane*	16.90%	1,640				
SDLP	Declan McAteer	15.12%	1,467				
SDLP	Michael Carr*	13.42%	1,302				
Sinn Féin	Mick Murphy*	12.99%	1,261				
SDLP	Sean O'Hare	12.48%	1,211	1,251.6			
Sinn Féin	Peter Kearney	8.24%	800	1,118.36	1,158.56	1,198.24	1,283.24
SDLP	Connaire McGreevey	5.05%	490	517.16	696.36	817.88	1,031.56
UUP	William Mitchell	7.55%	733	733.84	736.84	765.04	787.64
Independent	Jarlath Tinnelly	5.09%	494	517.24	530.84	584.36	
Green (NI)	Bonnie Anley	3.16%	307	317.08	330.08		
Electorate: 17,357 Valid: 9,705 (55.91%) Spoilt: 154 Quota: 1,214 Turnout: 9,859 (56.80%)

== 2005 Election ==
2001: 4 x SDLP, 2 x Sinn Féin, 1 x Independent

2005: 3 x SDLP, 2 x Sinn Féin, 1 x Green, 1 x Independent

2001-2005 Change: Green gain from SDLP

Crotlieve - 7 seats
Party	Candidate	FPv%	Count							
Party	Candidate	FPv%	1	2	3	4	5	6	7	8
SDLP	Michael Carr*	9.79%	1,041	1,045	1,056	1,344				
SDLP	Karen McKevitt	10.82%	1,150	1,151	1,157	1,277	1,398			
SDLP	Josephine O'Hare*	9.09%	966	968	975	998	1,113	1,168.44	1,305.44	1,437.44
Sinn Féin	Michael Ruane*	10.08%	1,071	1,071	1,097	1,110	1,136	1,136	1,137	1,331
Sinn Féin	Mick Murphy*	8.02%	852	852	1,151	1,159	1,203	1,204.32	1,206.32	1,265.32
Green (NI)	Ciaran Mussen	8.12%	863	866	878	886	925	928.52	1,076.52	1,231.52
Independent	Anthony Williamson*	6.65%	707	711	745	751	889	892.08	1,003.08	1,140.96
Sinn Féin	Peter Kearney	8.66%	921	921	959	964	981	983.64	987.08	1,012.08
Independent	Thomas McCann	7.01%	745	749	754	778	808	809.32	869.32	
UUP	Kenneth Donaldson	4.80%	510	767	767	770	774	774.44		
SDLP	Brendan Murney	4.98%	529	531	564	608				
SDLP	Paul McKibben	4.68%	498	498	499					
Sinn Féin	Geraldine McAteer	4.49%	477	477						
DUP	Wilma McCullough	2.82%	300							
Electorate: 15,832 Valid: 10,630 (67.14%) Spoilt: 198 Quota: 1,329 Turnout: 10,828 (68.39%)

== 2001 Election ==
1997: 4 x SDLP, 2 x Independent Nationalist, 1 x Sinn Féin

2001: 4 x SDLP, 2 x Sinn Féin, 1 x Independent

1997-2001 Change: Sinn Féin gain from Independent Nationalist, Independent Nationalist becomes Independent

Crotlieve - 7 seats
Party	Candidate	FPv%	Count							
Party	Candidate	FPv%	1	2	3	4	5	6	7	8
SDLP	P. J. Bradley*	18.63%	2,103							
Sinn Féin	Mick Murphy*	15.44%	1,743							
SDLP	Hugh Carr*	10.53%	1,189	1,455.56						
SDLP	Josephine O'Hare*	10.41%	1,175	1,397.02	1,421.91					
SDLP	Michael Carr	6.32%	714	761.6	772.62	774.96	806.81	833.75	1,188.53	1,364.72
Sinn Féin	Michael Ruane	7.15%	807	814.48	865.59	865.78	866.38	1,311.46	1,350.39	1,351.39
Independent	Anthony Williamson*	6.65%	751	765.96	777.93	781.93	782.48	842.62	1,022.7	1,161.7
Independent	Ciaran Mussen*	7.39%	834	854.74	877.73	884.73	885.43	896.89	947.89	1,056.57
UUP	John McConnell	6.17%	697	699.72	700.1	907.78	907.98	907.98	913.03	
SDLP	Brendan Murney	5.10%	576	661.34	673.5	674.5	677.15	729.21		
Sinn Féin	Eamonn O'Connor	3.79%	428	448.4	635.36	637.36	638.36			
DUP	Ruth McConnell	2.43%	274	275.02	275.21					
Electorate: 15,786 Valid: 11,291 (71.53%) Spoilt: 324 Quota: 1,412 Turnout: 11,615 (73.56%)

== 1997 Election ==
1993: 4 x SDLP, 2 x Independent Nationalist, 1 x UUP

1997: 4 x SDLP, 2 x Independent Nationalist, 1 x Sinn Féin

1993-1997 Change: Sinn Féin gain from UUP

Crotlieve - 7 seats
Party	Candidate	FPv%	Count						
Party	Candidate	FPv%	1	2	3	4	5	6	7
SDLP	P. J. Bradley*	17.77%	1,503						
Sinn Féin	Mick Murphy	16.82%	1,423						
SDLP	Hugh Carr*	11.52%	975	1,154.4					
Ind. Nationalist	Anthony Williamson*	10.18%	861	873.6	965.67	1,034.45	1,116.45		
SDLP	Josephine O'Hare	9.01%	762	837.6	891.85	914.54	1,058.97		
SDLP	Jim McCart*	8.46%	716	775.7	817.86	852.06	1,059.15		
Ind. Nationalist	Ciaran Mussen*	8.89%	752	770.3	857.1	885.49	909.15	955.65	977.65
UUP	Gordon Heslip*	10.56%	893	894.2	895.13	920.75	925.35	930.75	932.75
SDLP	Marietta Farrell	4.21%	356	437.3	503.02	536.97			
Alliance	Lindsay Whitcroft	2.59%	219	226.2	239.22				
Electorate: 14,584 Valid: 8,460 (58.01%) Spoilt: 210 Quota: 1,058 Turnout: 8,670 (59.45%)

== 1993 Election ==
1989: 5 x SDLP, 1 x UUP, 1 x Independent Nationalist

1993: 4 x SDLP, 2 x Independent Nationalist, 1 x UUP

1989-1993 Change: Independent Nationalist gain from SDLP

Crotlieve - 7 seats
Party	Candidate	FPv%	Count				
Party	Candidate	FPv%	1	2	3	4	5
SDLP	P. J. Bradley*	19.48%	1,698				
SDLP	Hugh Carr*	12.45%	1,085	1,330.31			
Ind. Nationalist	Anthony Williamson	12.13%	1,057	1,070.69	1,085.43	1,159.43	
Ind. Nationalist	Ciaran Mussen*	11.00%	959	980.46	1,000.05	1,124.05	
SDLP	Jim McCart*	9.51%	829	944.44	970.29	1,011.66	1,185.56
UUP	Gordon Heslip	12.14%	1,058	1,060.59	1,065.96	1,066.96	1,073.99
SDLP	Mary O'Hare	10.21%	890	949.94	976.23	1,014.71	1,035.8
SDLP	Brian Mulligan*	6.91%	602	723.36	732.69	782.17	810.29
Sinn Féin	Ann Marie Willis	4.83%	421	425.81	441.92		
Workers' Party	Raymond McEvoy	1.33%	116	135.24			
Electorate: 13,640 Valid: 8,715 (63.89%) Spoilt: 227 Quota: 1,090 Turnout: 8,942 (65.56%)

== 1989 Election ==
1985: 4 x SDLP, 2 x UUP, 1 x Independent Nationalist

1989: 5 x SDLP, 1 x UUP, 1 x Independent Nationalist

1985-1989 Change: SDLP gain from UUP

Crotlieve - 7 seats
Party	Candidate	FPv%	Count				
Party	Candidate	FPv%	1	2	3	4	5
SDLP	P. J. Bradley*	16.32%	1,488				
UUP	Violet Cromie*	15.11%	1,378				
SDLP	Hugh Carr	11.85%	1,081	1,183.81			
Ind. Nationalist	Ciaran Mussen*	10.46%	954	971.94	974.15	1,109.61	1,274.61
SDLP	Patrick Maginn	8.40%	766	818.9	819.92	849.15	1,153.15
SDLP	Jim McCart*	10.89%	993	1,054.87	1,055.72	1,080.87	1,121.77
SDLP	Brian Mulligan*	10.94%	998	1,081.49	1,081.66	1,120.81	1,151.81
UUP	John Fisher	5.65%	515	516.38	742.82	742.82	743.82
SDLP	Felix O'Hare	6.11%	557	566.43	566.43	602.89	
Sinn Féin	Ann Marie Willis	4.27%	389	392.91	392.91		
Electorate: 13,264 Valid: 9,119 (68.75%) Spoilt: 256 Quota: 1,140 Turnout: 9,375 (70.68%)

== 1985 Election ==
1985: 4 x SDLP, 2 x UUP, 1 x Independent Nationalist

Crotlieve - 7 seats
Party	Candidate	FPv%	Count								
Party	Candidate	FPv%	1	2	3	4	5	6	7	8	9
SDLP	P. J. Bradley*	22.09%	1,717								
SDLP	Jim McCart*	11.63%	904	1,138.08							
UUP	Violet Cromie*	10.92%	849	855.6	855.6	856.04	1,238.04				
SDLP	Brian Mulligan*	8.17%	635	781.08	826.65	861.05	863.05	864.59	1,079.59		
SDLP	Patrick Harper*	7.22%	561	732.6	761.74	785.36	785.36	785.36	1,003.97		
UUP	William McCoy	7.04%	547	548.76	549.38	560.13	699.13	961.7	974.7		
Ind. Nationalist	Ciaran Mussen	8.77%	682	708.84	715.35	754.43	755.43	755.43	781.36	800.36	804.7
Ind. Nationalist	Sean Tinnelly	7.74%	602	613.88	616.36	718.07	718.07	718.07	760.02	790.02	793.43
SDLP	Liam Trainor*	5.06%	393	500.36	568.25	657.02	657.02	657.79			
DUP	William Sterritt*	6.91%	537	537	537	539					
Independent	Francis Price	2.26%	176	190.96	194.68						
Workers' Party	Henry Smyth	1.81%	141	149.36	153.7						
Independent Labour	Johnny Ward	0.39%	30	33.52	35.07						
Electorate: 12,132 Valid: 7,774 (64.08%) Spoilt: 231 Quota: 972 Turnout: 8,005 (65.98%)
