= Slieve Gullion (District Electoral Area) =

District electoral area in Northern Ireland

- Newry, Mourne and Down District Council DEA constituency

Current constituency
- Created: 1985
- Seats: 5 (1985-2014); 7 (2014-)
- Councillors: Pete Byrne (SDLP); Martin Hearty (SF); Mickey Larkin (SF); Oonagh Magennis (SF); Declan Murphy (SF); Áine Quinn (SF); David Taylor (UUP)

Slieve Gullion DEA within Newry, Mourne and Down

Slieve Gullion DEA (1993-2014) within Newry and Mourne

Slieve Gullion is one of the seven district electoral areas (DEA) in Newry, Mourne and Down, Northern Ireland. The district elects seven members to Newry, Mourne and Down District Council and contains the wards of Bessbrook, Camlough, Crossmaglen, Forkhill, Mullaghbane, Newtownhamilton and Whitecross. Slieve Gullion forms part of the Newry and Armagh constituencies for the Northern Ireland Assembly and UK Parliament.

It was created for the 1985 local elections, replacing Newry and Mourne Areas D and E which had existed since 1973, where it originally contained five wards (Creggan, Crossmaglen, Fathom, Forkhill and Silver Bridge). For the 2014 local elections it gained two additional wards, gaining most of the abolished The Fews DEA including Bessbrook, Camlough and Newtownhamilton.

== Councillors ==
Election	Councillor (Party)	Councillor (Party)	Councillor (Party)	Councillor (Party)	Councillor (Party)	Councillor (Party)	Councillor (Party)
2023	Martin Hearty (Sinn Féin)	Mickey Larkin (Sinn Féin)	Declan Murphy (Sinn Féin)	Áine Quinn (Sinn Féin)	Pete Byrne (SDLP)	Oonagh Magennis (Sinn Féin)	David Taylor (UUP)
2023	Aoife Finnegan (Sinn Féin)	Mickey Larkin (Sinn Féin)	Declan Murphy (Sinn Féin)	Áine Quinn (Sinn Féin)	Pete Byrne (SDLP)	Oonagh Magennis (Sinn Féin)	David Taylor (UUP)
May 2020 Co-Option	Aoife Finnegan (Sinn Féin)	Mickey Larkin (Sinn Féin)	Declan Murphy (Sinn Féin)	Barra Ó'Muirí (Sinn Féin)	Pete Byrne (SDLP)	Oonagh Magennis (Sinn Féin)	David Taylor (UUP)
February 2020 Co-Option	Terry Hearty (Sinn Féin)	Mickey Larkin (Sinn Féin)	Declan Murphy (Sinn Féin)	Barra Ó'Muirí (Sinn Féin)	Pete Byrne (SDLP)	Oonagh Magennis (Sinn Féin)	David Taylor (UUP)
2019	Terry Hearty (Sinn Féin)	Mickey Larkin (Sinn Féin)	Roisin Mulgrew (Sinn Féin)	Barra Ó'Muirí (Sinn Féin)	Pete Byrne (SDLP)	Oonagh Magennis (Sinn Féin)	David Taylor (UUP)
January 2016 Co-Option	Terry Hearty (Sinn Féin)	Mickey Larkin (Sinn Féin)	Roisin Mulgrew (Sinn Féin)	Barra Ó'Muirí (Sinn Féin)	Pete Byrne (SDLP)	Kate Loughran (SDLP)	David Taylor (UUP)
2014	Terry Hearty (Sinn Féin)	Mickey Larkin (Sinn Féin)	Roisin Mulgrew (Sinn Féin)	Barra Ó'Muirí (Sinn Féin)	Geraldine Donnelly (SDLP)	Kate Loughran (SDLP)	David Taylor (UUP)
2011	Terry Hearty (Sinn Féin)	Patrick McDonald (Sinn Féin)	Colman Burns (Sinn Féin)	Anthony Flynn (Sinn Féin)	Geraldine Donnelly (SDLP)	5 seats 1985–2014	5 seats 1985–2014
2005	Terry Hearty (Sinn Féin)	Patrick McDonald (Sinn Féin)	Colman Burns (Sinn Féin)	Anthony Flynn (Sinn Féin)	Geraldine Donnelly (SDLP)	5 seats 1985–2014	5 seats 1985–2014
2001	Terry Hearty (Sinn Féin)	Patrick McDonald (Sinn Féin)	Colman Burns (Sinn Féin)	Elena Martin (Sinn Féin)	John Fee (SDLP)	5 seats 1985–2014	5 seats 1985–2014
1997	Patrick McNamee (Sinn Féin)	Patrick McDonald (Sinn Féin)	Patrick Brennan (Sinn Féin)	Pat Toner (SDLP)	John Fee (SDLP)	5 seats 1985–2014	5 seats 1985–2014
1993	Jim McAllister (Sinn Féin)	Patrick McDonald (Sinn Féin)	Terry Mulkerns (SDLP)	Pat Toner (SDLP)	John Fee (SDLP)	5 seats 1985–2014	5 seats 1985–2014
1989	Jim McAllister (Sinn Féin)	Jimmy McCreesh (Sinn Féin)	Michael O'Neill (SDLP)	Pat Toner (SDLP)	John Fee (SDLP)	5 seats 1985–2014	5 seats 1985–2014
1985	Jim McAllister (Sinn Féin)	Eamon Larkin (Sinn Féin)	Owen Kelly (SDLP)	Pat Toner (SDLP)	Noel McKevitt (SDLP)	5 seats 1985–2014	5 seats 1985–2014

== 2023 Election ==
2019: 5 x Sinn Féin, 1 x SDLP, 1 x UUP

2023: 5 x Sinn Féin, 1 x SDLP, 1 x UUP

2019–2023 Change: No change

Slieve Gullion - 7 seats
Party	Candidate	FPv%	Count								
Party	Candidate	FPv%	1	2	3	4	5	6	7	8	9
Sinn Féin	Aoife Finnegan* †	13.16%	1,934								
Sinn Féin	Áine Quinn	13.15%	1,932								
Sinn Féin	Declan Murphy*	12.98%	1,907								
SDLP	Pete Byrne*	9.85%	1,447	1,462.30	1,468.30	1,472.54	1,473.35	1,554.56	1,670.23	2,404.23	
Sinn Féin	Mickey Larkin*	10.61%	1,558	1,573.26	1,579.30	1,640.54	1,645.61	1,669.12	1,719.61	1,795.24	1,946.24
Sinn Féin	Oonagh Magennis*	8.96%	1,316	1,368.55	1,376.60	1,379.62	1,387.95	1,411.32	1,445.60	1,511.77	1,617.77
UUP	David Taylor*	8.15%	1,197	1,197	1,198	1,198	1,198.09	1,226.09	1,570.09	1,592.15	1,628.15
Sinn Féin	Barra Ó'Muirí*	9.06%	1,331	1,339.30	1,343.30	1,348.86	1,385.76	1,393.08	1,432.23	1,463.35	1,503.35
SDLP	Killian Feehan	6.15%	903	904.20	913.20	913.72	917.72	1,015.85	1,102.07		
Aontú	Liam Reichenberg	2.99%	439	439.50	446.50	447.66	448.05	489.09			
DUP	Linda Henry	2.45%	360	360.10	360.10	360.14	360.14	360.14			
Alliance	Caolán Gregory	2.03%	298	298.90	321.95	322.47	323.10				
Green (NI)	Molly Ní Mhánais	0.47%	69	69.15							
Electorate: 22,734 Valid: 14,691 (64.62%) Spoilt: 266 Quota: 1,837 Turnout: 14,957 (65.79%)

== 2019 Election ==
2014: 4 x Sinn Féin, 2 x SDLP, 1 x UUP

2019: 5 x Sinn Féin, 1 x SDLP, 1 x UUP

2014-2019 Change: Sinn Féin gain from SDLP

Slieve Gullion - 7 seats
Party	Candidate	FPv%	Count			
Party	Candidate	FPv%	1	2	3	4
Sinn Féin	Terry Hearty* †	14.98%	1,876			
Sinn Féin	Mickey Larkin*	13.14%	1,646			
SDLP	Pete Byrne*	13.12%	1,643			
Sinn Féin	Oonagh Magennis	12.95%	1,622			
Sinn Féin	Barra Ó'Muirí*	10.79%	1,351	1,571.49		
UUP	David Taylor*	10.28%	1,287	1,287.34	1,577.34	
Sinn Féin	Roisin Mulgrew* †	10.88%	1,362	1,414.19	1,482.04	1,554.44
SDLP	Kate Loughran*	8.46%	1,059	1,076.85	1,291.89	1,296.34
Alliance	Gazdag Balázs	2.88%	361	365.08		
DUP	Linda Henry	2.52%	315	316.19		
Electorate: 20,858 Valid: 12,522 (60.03%) Spoilt: 295 Quota: 1,566 Turnout: 12,817 (61.45%)

== 2014 Election ==
2011: 4 x Sinn Féin, 1 x SDLP

2014: 4 x Sinn Féin, 2 x SDLP, 1 x UUP

2011-2014 Change: SDLP and UUP gain due to the addition of two seats

Slieve Gullion - 7 seats
Party	Candidate	FPv%	Count						
Party	Candidate	FPv%	1	2	3	4	5	6	7
Sinn Féin	Terry Hearty*	19.14%	2,135						
SDLP	Geraldine Donnelly* †	13.59%	1,516						
Sinn Féin	Mickey Larkin*	12.65%	1,411						
Sinn Féin	Barra Ó Muirí*	10.92%	1,218	1,773.12					
UUP	David Taylor*	11.14%	1,243	1,246.24	1,599.24				
Sinn Féin	Róisín Mulgrew*	11.46%	1,278	1,312.56	1,312.92	1,632.87			
SDLP	Kate Loughran	9.66%	1,078	1,106.44	1,110.44	1,122.05	1,123.65	1,248.65	1,345.61
Sinn Féin	Daire Hughes	8.06%	899	1,004.84	1,011.2	1,055.48	1,283.68	1,283.68	1,294.48
DUP	Lavelle McIlwrath	3.37%	376	377.8					
Electorate: 19,834 Valid: 11,154 (56.24%) Spoilt: 216 Quota: 1,395 Turnout: 11,370 (57.33%)

== 2011 Election ==
2005: 4 x Sinn Féin, 1 x SDLP

2011: 4 x Sinn Féin, 1 x SDLP

2005-2011 Change: No change

Slieve Gullion - 5 seats
Party	Candidate	FPv%	Count	
Party	Candidate	FPv%	1	2
SDLP	Geraldine Donnelly*	22.05%	1,681	
Sinn Féin	Terry Hearty*	17.31%	1,320	
Sinn Féin	Colman Burns*	17.21%	1,312	
Sinn Féin	Anthony Flynn*	15.28%	1,165	1,327.87
Sinn Féin	Patrick McDonald*	15.29%	1,166	1,295.93
Sinn Féin	Padra McNamee	12.85%	980	1,094.07
Electorate: 11,983 Valid: 7,624 (63.62%) Spoilt: 150 Quota: 1,271 Turnout: 7,774 (64.88%)

== 2005 Election ==
2001: 4 x Sinn Féin, 1 x SDLP

2005: 4 x Sinn Féin, 1 x SDLP

2001-2005 Change: No change

Slieve Gullion - 5 seats
Party	Candidate	FPv%	Count		
Party	Candidate	FPv%	1	2	3
Sinn Féin	Colman Burns*	16.98%	1,399		
SDLP	Geraldine Donnelly	13.97%	1,151	1,827	
Sinn Féin	Patrick McDonald*	13.41%	1,105	1,185	1,323
Sinn Féin	Terry Hearty*	15.72%	1,295	1,304	1,318
Sinn Féin	Anthony Flynn	15.09%	1,243	1,263	1,312
Sinn Féin	Mary Campbell	14.85%	1,223	1,230	1,262
SDLP	Peter McEvoy	9.98%	822		
Electorate: 10,836 Valid: 8,238 (76.02%) Spoilt: 167 Quota: 1,374 Turnout: 8,405 (77.57%)

== 2001 Election ==
1997: 3 x Sinn Féin, 2 x SDLP

2001: 4 x Sinn Féin, 1 x SDLP

1997-2001 Change: No change

Slieve Gullion - 5 seats
Party	Candidate	FPv%	Count				
Party	Candidate	FPv%	1	2	3	4	5
Sinn Féin	Elena Martin	17.58%	1,436				
Sinn Féin	Colman Burns	17.52%	1,431				
Sinn Féin	Patrick McDonald*	17.32%	1,415				
Sinn Féin	Terry Hearty	15.71%	1,283	1,292	1,347.6	1,397.08	
SDLP	John Fee*	14.63%	1,195	1,318	1,321.35	1,326.11	1,347.04
SDLP	Pat Toner*	10.28%	840	1,253	1,260.1	1,261.7	1,291.99
SDLP	Mary McKeown	6.95%	568				
Electorate: 10,524 Valid: 8,168 (77.61%) Spoilt: 273 Quota: 1,362 Turnout: 8,441 (80.21%)

== 1997 Election ==
1993: 3 x SDLP, 2 x Sinn Féin

1997: 3 x Sinn Féin, 2 x SDLP

1993-1997 Change: Sinn Féin gain from SDLP

Slieve Gullion - 5 seats
Party	Candidate	FPv%	Count	
Party	Candidate	FPv%	1	2
SDLP	John Fee*	22.51%	1,412	
Sinn Féin	Patrick Brennan	18.30%	1,148	
Sinn Féin	Patrick McDonald*	17.76%	1,114	
Sinn Féin	Patrick McNamee	17.66%	1,108	
SDLP	Pat Toner*	13.47%	845	1,043.8
SDLP	Dessie McDonnell	10.31%	647	804.36
Electorate: 9,847 Valid: 6,274 (63.71%) Spoilt: 174 Quota: 1,046 Turnout: 6,448 (65.48%)

== 1993 Election ==
1989: 3 x SDLP, 2 x Sinn Féin

1993: 3 x SDLP, 2 x Sinn Féin

1989-1993 Change: No change

Slieve Gullion - 5 seats
Party	Candidate	FPv%	Count		
Party	Candidate	FPv%	1	2	3
SDLP	John Fee*	20.08%	1,227		
Sinn Féin	Jim McAllister*	17.77%	1,086		
Sinn Féin	Patrick McDonald	16.82%	1,028		
SDLP	Pat Toner*	14.15%	865	1,121	
SDLP	Terry Mulkerns	13.01%	795	885	1,061.75
Sinn Féin	Patrick Brennan	11.42%	698	718	743.75
SDLP	Michael McShane	6.74%	412		
Electorate: 9,214 Valid: 6,111 (66.32%) Spoilt: 208 Quota: 1,019 Turnout: 6,319 (68.58%)

== 1989 Election ==
1985: 3 x SDLP, 2 x Sinn Féin

1989: 3 x SDLP, 2 x Sinn Féin

1985-1989 Change: No change

Slieve Gullion - 5 seats
Party	Candidate	FPv%	Count			
Party	Candidate	FPv%	1	2	3	4
SDLP	John Fee	20.41%	1,207			
SDLP	Pat Toner*	19.85%	1,174			
Sinn Féin	Jim McAllister*	17.50%	1,035			
SDLP	Michael O'Neill	16.82%	995			
Sinn Féin	Jimmy McCreesh	12.78%	756	825.16	855.52	928.92
Sinn Féin	Patrick McDonald	9.13%	540	551.44	592.8	623.8
Ind. Republican	Brian Woods	3.52%	208	347.88	464.04	
Electorate: 8,845 Valid: 5,915 (66.87%) Spoilt: 292 Quota: 986 Turnout: 6,207 (70.18%)

== 1985 Election ==
1985: 3 x SDLP, 2 x Sinn Féin

Slieve Gullion - 5 seats
Party	Candidate	FPv%	Count				
Party	Candidate	FPv%	1	2	3	4	5
Sinn Féin	Jim McAllister	20.36%	1,199				
SDLP	Pat Toner*	18.24%	1,074				
SDLP	Owen Kelly*	13.38%	788	821.44	854.72	944.83	986.83
Sinn Féin	Eamon Larkin	12.08%	711	738.93	741.73	744.92	980.72
SDLP	Noel McKevitt	13.20%	777	779.66	811.02	821.37	954.03
Sinn Féin	Patrick Murphy	10.58%	623	738.33	742.65	774.55	856.74
Irish Independence	Jim Murphy*	4.55%	268	281.49	288.93	307.36	
Sinn Féin	Sarah Murphy	4.43%	261	269.74	271.26	283.67	
Ind. Republican	Brian Woods	3.18%	187	198.59	200.67		
Electorate: 8,395 Valid: 5,888 (70.14%) Spoilt: 211 Quota: 982 Turnout: 6,099 (72.65%)
