= The Fews (District Electoral Area) =

District electoral areas in Newry and Mourne, Northern Ireland

The Fews DEA (1993-2014) within Newry and Mourne

The Fews was one of the three district electoral areas in Newry and Mourne, Northern Ireland which existed from 1985 to 2014. The district elected six members to Newry and Mourne District Council, and formed part of the Newry and Armagh constituencies for the Northern Ireland Assembly and UK Parliament.

It was created for the 1985 local elections, replacing Newry and Mourne Areas D and E which had existed since 1973, and contained the wards of Bessbrook, Camlough, Derrymore, Donaghmore, Newtownhamilton and Tullyhappy. It was abolished for the 2014 local elections and largely replaced with the Slieve Gullion DEA.

== Councillors ==
Election	Councillor (Party)	Councillor (Party)	Councillor (Party)	Councillor (Party)	Councillor (Party)	Councillor (Party)
2011	Turlough Murphy (Sinn Féin)	Jimmy McCreesh (Sinn Féin)	Patrick McGinn (Sinn Féin)	John Feehan (SDLP)	Andy Moffett (UUP)	David Taylor (UUP)
2005	Brendan Lewis (Sinn Féin)	Jimmy McCreesh (Sinn Féin)	Patrick McGinn (Sinn Féin)	John Feehan (SDLP)	Glenn Oliver (DUP)	Danny Kennedy (UUP)
2001	Brendan Lewis (Sinn Féin)	Jimmy McCreesh (Sinn Féin)	Patrick McGinn (Sinn Féin)	John Feehan (SDLP)	Andy Moffett (UUP)	Danny Kennedy (UUP)
1997	Brendan Lewis (Sinn Féin)	Jimmy McCreesh (Sinn Féin)	Stephen McGinn (SDLP)	Charlie Smyth (SDLP)	Andy Moffett (UUP)	Danny Kennedy (UUP)
1993	Conor Murphy (Sinn Féin)	James Savage (SDLP)	Stephen McGinn (SDLP)	Charlie Smyth (SDLP)	Arthur Lockhart (UUP)	Danny Kennedy (UUP)
1989	Conor Murphy (Sinn Féin)	James Savage (SDLP)	Stephen McGinn (SDLP)	Charlie Smyth (SDLP)	Andy Moffett (UUP)	Danny Kennedy (UUP)
1985	Brendan Lewis (Sinn Féin)	James Savage (SDLP)	Nan Sands (SDLP)	Gordon Heslip (DUP)	Andy Moffett (UUP)	Danny Kennedy (UUP)

== 2011 Election ==
2005: 3 x Sinn Féin, 1 x UUP, 1 x SDLP, 1 x DUP

2011: 3 x Sinn Féin, 2 x UUP, 1 x SDLP

2005-2011 Change: UUP gain from DUP

The Fews - 6 seats
Party	Candidate	FPv%	Count					
Party	Candidate	FPv%	1	2	3	4	5	6
UUP	Andy Moffett*	18.41%	1,421					
Sinn Féin	Turlough Murphy	16.83%	1,299					
Sinn Féin	Patrick McGinn*	15.60%	1,204					
SDLP	John Feehan*	15.43%	1,191					
Sinn Féin	Jimmy McCreesh*	13.80%	1,065	1,066.15	1,242.95			
UUP	David Taylor	5.51%	425	667.42	667.58	667.74	668.49	1,146.39
SDLP	Kevin O'Hare	7.85%	606	611.75	621.99	654.47	749.47	759.79
DUP	Glenn Oliver*	4.29%	331	368.49	369.13	369.61	370.61	
TUV	Barrie Halliday	2.31%	178	203.3	203.62	204.1	204.85	
Electorate: 12,613 Valid: 7,720 (61.21%) Spoilt: 167 Quota: 1,103 Turnout: 7,887 (62.53%)

== 2005 Election ==
2001: 3 x Sinn Féin, 2 x UUP, 1 x SDLP

2005: 3 x Sinn Féin, 1 x UUP, 1 x SDLP, 1 x DUP

2001-2005 Change: DUP gain from UUP

The Fews - 6 seats
Party	Candidate	FPv%	Count			
Party	Candidate	FPv%	1	2	3	4
Sinn Féin	Patrick McGinn*	15.15%	1,246			
Sinn Féin	Jimmy McCreesh*	14.47%	1,190			
Sinn Féin	Brendan Lewis*	13.80%	1,135	1,184.7		
SDLP	John Feehan*	11.63%	957	963.2	1,218.2	
UUP	Danny Kennedy*	14.21%	1,169	1,169.75	1,179.75	
DUP	Glenn Oliver	8.28%	681	681	681	1,064.05
SDLP	Susan Mackin	8.73%	718	720.25	918.95	992.25
UUP	Andy Moffett*	7.25%	596	596.6	601.65	
SDLP	Noelle McGarvey	6.49%	534	535.7		
Electorate: 11,551 Valid: 8,226 (71.21%) Spoilt: 168 Quota: 1,176 Turnout: 8,394 (72.67%)

== 2001 Election ==
1997: 2 x Sinn Féin, 2 x UUP, 2 x SDLP

2001: 3 x Sinn Féin, 2 x UUP, 1 x SDLP

1997-2001 Change: Sinn Féin gain from SDLP

The Fews - 6 seats
Party	Candidate	FPv%	Count					
Party	Candidate	FPv%	1	2	3	4	5	6
Sinn Féin	Jimmy McCreesh*	14.39%	1,279					
Sinn Féin	Patrick McGinn	13.98%	1,243	1,279				
SDLP	John Feehan	12.05%	1,071	1,271				
UUP	Danny Kennedy*	13.85%	1,231	1,233	1,608			
UUP	Andy Moffett*	8.18%	727	740	968	1,300.76		
Sinn Féin	Brendan Lewis*	13.18%	1,172	1,198	1,198	1,199.88	1,199.88	1,199.88
SDLP	Charlie Smyth*	9.89%	879	1,158	1,160	1,160.94	1,190.44	1,190.44
DUP	Craig Baxter	7.80%	693	694				
SDLP	Angela Savage	6.69%	595					
Electorate: 11,457 Valid: 8,890 (77.59%) Spoilt: 231 Quota: 1,271 Turnout: 9,121 (79.61%)

== 1997 Election ==
1993: 3 x SDLP, 2 x UUP, 1 x Sinn Féin

1997: 2 x SDLP, 2 x UUP, 2 x Sinn Féin

1993-1997 Change: Sinn Féin gain from SDLP

The Fews - 6 seats
Party	Candidate	FPv%	Count		
Party	Candidate	FPv%	1	2	3
UUP	Danny Kennedy*	22.27%	1,610		
Sinn Féin	Brendan Lewis	15.25%	1,103		
UUP	Andy Moffett	13.17%	952	1,510.72	
SDLP	Stephen McGinn*	14.08%	1,018	1,022.68	1,055.8
SDLP	Charlie Smyth*	13.48%	975	976.44	1,035.84
Sinn Féin	Jimmy McCreesh	12.21%	883	884.08	885.52
SDLP	James Savage*	6.69%	690	691.44	746.88
Electorate: 10,907 Valid: 7,231 (66.30%) Spoilt: 219 Quota: 1,034 Turnout: 7,450 (68.30%)

== 1993 Election ==
1989: 3 x SDLP, 2 x UUP, 1 x Sinn Féin

1993: 3 x SDLP, 2 x UUP, 1 x Sinn Féin

1989-1993 Change: No change

The Fews - 6 seats
Party	Candidate	FPv%	Count			
Party	Candidate	FPv%	1	2	3	4
UUP	Danny Kennedy*	25.17%	1,765			
SDLP	Stephen McGinn*	17.18%	1,205			
UUP	Arthur Lockhart	11.32%	794	1,541.56		
SDLP	James Savage*	13.68%	959	962.96	1,030.72	
SDLP	Charlie Smyth*	13.89%	974	977.96	1,028.12	
Sinn Féin	Conor Murphy*	10.85%	761	761.44	762.32	907.87
Sinn Féin	Jimmy McCreesh	7.90%	554	554.44	556.64	613.44
Electorate: 10,399 Valid: 7,012 (67.43%) Spoilt: 270 Quota: 1,002 Turnout: 7,282 (70.03%)

== 1989 Election ==
1985: 3 x SDLP, 2 x UUP, 1 x Sinn Féin

1989: 2 x SDLP, 2 x UUP, 1 x Sinn Féin, 1 x DUP

1985-1989 Change: SDLP gain from DUP

The Fews - 6 seats
Party	Candidate	FPv%	Count				
Party	Candidate	FPv%	1	2	3	4	5
UUP	Danny Kennedy*	18.19%	1,406				
SDLP	Stephen McGinn	14.98%	1,158				
SDLP	James Savage*	14.27%	1,103	1,124			
SDLP	Charlie Smyth	14.27%	1,103	1,111			
UUP	Andy Moffett*	13.66%	1,056	1,079	1,350.74		
Sinn Féin	Conor Murphy	9.12%	705	713	713.21	713.21	1,126.21
DUP	Gordon Heslip*	7.95%	614	615	635.58	878.38	878.38
Sinn Féin	Patrick Quinn	6.30%	487	491	491	491	
Workers' Party	Brian Mulligan	1.24%	96				
Electorate: 10,545 Valid: 7,728 (73.29%) Spoilt: 223 Quota: 1,105 Turnout: 7,951 (75.40%)

== 1985 Election ==
1985: 2 x UUP, 2 x SDLP, 1 x Sinn Féin, 1 x DUP

The Fews - 6 seats
Party	Candidate	FPv%	Count							
Party	Candidate	FPv%	1	2	3	4	5	6	7	8
Sinn Féin	Brendan Lewis	18.94%	1,302							
SDLP	James Savage*	13.25%	911	1,011						
UUP	Andy Moffett*	11.16%	767	768.2	779.6	1,051.6				
UUP	Danny Kennedy	10.91%	750	750.4	754.8	810.2	828.7	863.7	1,300.7	
SDLP	Nan Sands*	11.10%	763	803	844	846	846.25	947.25	951.45	955.45
DUP	Gordon Heslip	7.90%	543	543	544	589	593.5	599.9	686.15	917.15
SDLP	John McElherron	6.55%	450	525.2	583.2	583.2	583.2	789.8	792.8	793.8
UUP	David McMullan	7.19%	494	494.8	495.2	508.2	552.7	562.7		
Alliance	Victor Frizell	5.18%	356	387.6	428.2	428.2	428.2			
UUP	Florence Henning	5.72%	393	393.4	393.4					
Workers' Party	Brian Mulligan	1.32%	91	109.4						
Irish Independence	Francis McCamley*	0.79%	54	104						
Electorate: 9,873 Valid: 6,874 (69.62%) Spoilt: 141 Quota: 983 Turnout: 7,015 (71.05%)
