= 1986 Newry and Armagh by-election =

UK parliamentary by-election

← 1983	23 January 1986	1987 →

Constituency of Newry and Armagh
- Turnout: 76.9% (▲0.9%)
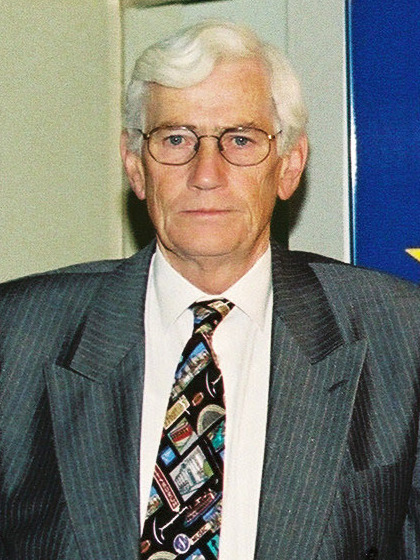

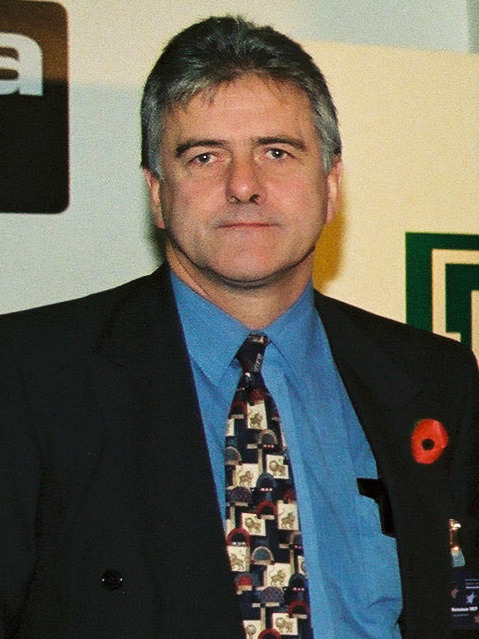
	First party	Second party	Third party
			SF
Candidate	Seamus Mallon	Jim Nicholson	Jim McAllister
Party	SDLP	UUP	Sinn Féin
Popular vote	22,694	20,111	6,609
Percentage	45.5%	40.3%	13.2%
Swing	▲8.7%	▲0.3%	▼7.7%
MP before election
Jim Nicholson
UUP
Subsequent MP
Seamus Mallon
SDLP

The 1986 by-election in Newry and Armagh was caused by the resignation of incumbent Member of Parliament Jim Nicholson.

Nicholson, along with all sitting Unionist MPs, resigned their Westminster seats in December 1985, to highlight their opposition to the Anglo-Irish Agreement and to use the resultant by-elections to campaign on the issue.

The poll was held on 23 January 1986, and was unusual for a by-election in the turnout being higher than for the preceding general election, however Nicholson was not re-elected, (despite gaining an increase in his own vote) losing his seat to the nationalist SDLP candidate Seamus Mallon. Nicholson also failed to recapture the seat at the following general election.

== Result ==
1986 Newry and Armagh by-election
Party	Candidate	Votes	%	±%
SDLP	Seamus Mallon	22,694	45.5	+8.7
UUP	Jim Nicholson	20,111	40.3	+0.3
Sinn Féin	Jim McAllister	6,609	13.2	−7.7
Workers' Party	Patrick McCusker	515	1.0	−1.3
Majority		2,583	5.2	N/A
Turnout		49,929	76.9	+0.9
Registered electors		65,142		
SDLP gain from UUP		Swing	+4.2	
