= Newry (District Electoral Area) =

District electoral area in Northern Ireland

- Newry, Mourne and Down District Council DEA constituency

Current constituency
- Created: 1985
- Seats: 7 (1985-2014); 6 (2014-)
- Councillors: Killian Feehan (SDLP); Doire Finn (SDLP); Valerie Harte (SF); Geraldine Kearns (SF); Cathal King (SF); Aidan Mathers (SF)

Newry DEA within Newry, Mourne and Down

Newry Town DEA (1993-2014) within Newry and Mourne

Newry is one of the seven district electoral areas (DEA) in Newry, Mourne and Down, Northern Ireland. The district elects six members to Newry, Mourne and Down District Council and contains the wards of Abbey, Ballybot, Damolly, Drumalane, Fathom and St. Patrick's. Newry forms part of the Newry and Armagh constituencies for the Northern Ireland Assembly and UK Parliament.

It was created for the 1985 local elections, where it was called Newry Town until 2014, replacing Newry and Mourne Areas D and F which had existed since 1973, and originally contained seven wards (Ballybot, Daisy Hill, Drumalane, Drumgallion, St. Mary's, St. Patrick's and Windsor Hill). For the 2014 local elections it was reduced by one ward.

== Councillors ==
Election	Councillor (Party)	Councillor (Party)	Councillor (Party)	Councillor (Party)	Councillor (Party)	Councillor (Party)	Councillor (Party)
November 2023 Co-Option	Aidan Mathers (Sinn Féin)	Cathal King (Sinn Féin)	Geraldine Kearns (Sinn Féin)	Valerie Harte (Sinn Féin)	Killian Feehan (SDLP)	Doire Finn (SDLP)	6 seats 2014–present
2023	Aidan Mathers (Sinn Féin)	Cathal King (Sinn Féin)	Geraldine Kearns (Sinn Féin)	Valerie Harte (Sinn Féin)	Michael Savage (SDLP)	Doire Finn (SDLP)	6 seats 2014–present
December 2022 Co-Options	Gavin Malone (Independent)	Cathal King (Sinn Féin)	Geraldine Kearns (Sinn Féin)	Valerie Harte (Sinn Féin)	Michael Savage (SDLP)	Gary Stokes (SDLP)	6 seats 2014–present
February 2020 Co-Option	Gavin Malone (Independent)	Roisin Mulgrew (Sinn Féin)	Charlie Casey (Sinn Féin)	Valerie Harte (Sinn Féin)	Michael Savage (SDLP)	Gary Stokes (SDLP)	6 seats 2014–present
2019	Gavin Malone (Independent)	Liz Kimmins (Sinn Féin)	Charlie Casey (Sinn Féin)	Valerie Harte (Sinn Féin)	Michael Savage (SDLP)	Gary Stokes (SDLP)	6 seats 2014–present
August 2017 Co-Option	Davy Hyland (Independent)	Liz Kimmins (Sinn Féin)	Charlie Casey (Sinn Féin)	Valerie Harte (Sinn Féin)	Michael Savage (SDLP)	Gary Stokes (SDLP)	6 seats 2014–present
April 2015 Defection	Davy Hyland (Independent)	Liz Kimmins (Sinn Féin)	Charlie Casey (Sinn Féin)	Valerie Harte (Sinn Féin)	Kevin McAteer (SDLP)/ (Independent)	Gary Stokes (SDLP)	6 seats 2014–present
2014	Davy Hyland (Independent)	Liz Kimmins (Sinn Féin)	Charlie Casey (Sinn Féin)	Valerie Harte (Sinn Féin)	Kevin McAteer (SDLP)/ (Independent)	Gary Stokes (SDLP)	6 seats 2014–present
2011	Davy Hyland (Independent)	Brendan Curran (Sinn Féin)	Charlie Casey (Sinn Féin)	Valerie Harte (Sinn Féin)	John McArdle (SDLP)	Frank Feely (SDLP)	Jack Patterson (Independent)
2005	Marian Mathers (Sinn Féin)	Brendan Curran (Sinn Féin)	Charlie Casey (Sinn Féin)	Gary Stokes (SDLP)	John McArdle (SDLP)	Frank Feely (SDLP)	Jack Patterson (Independent)
2001	Davy Hyland (Sinn Féin)	Brendan Curran (Sinn Féin)	Charlie Casey (Sinn Féin)	Patrick McElroy (SDLP)	John McArdle (SDLP)	Frank Feely (SDLP)	Jack Patterson (Independent)
1997	Davy Hyland (Sinn Féin)	Brendan Curran (Sinn Féin)	William McCaigue (UUP)	Patrick McElroy (SDLP)	Eugene Markey (Independent Nationalist)	Frank Feely (SDLP)	Jack Patterson (Independent)
1993	Davy Hyland (Sinn Féin)	Brendan Curran (Sinn Féin)	William McCaigue (UUP)	Patrick McElroy (SDLP)	Arthur Ruddy (SDLP)	Frank Feely (SDLP)	Jack Patterson (Independent)
1989	Eugene Markey (Independent Nationalist)/ (IIP)	Brendan Curran (Sinn Féin)	William McCaigue (UUP)	Patrick McElroy (SDLP)	Arthur Ruddy (SDLP)	Frank Feely (SDLP)	Sean Gallogly (SDLP)
1985	Eugene Markey (Independent Nationalist)/ (IIP)	Brendan Curran (Sinn Féin)	William McCaigue (UUP)	Patrick McElroy (SDLP)	Arthur Ruddy (SDLP)	Thomas McGrath (SDLP)	Sean Gallogly (SDLP)

== 2023 Election ==
2019: 3 x Sinn Féin, 2 x SDLP, 1 x Independent

2023: 4 x Sinn Féin, 2 x SDLP

2019–2023 Change: Sinn Féin gain from Independent

Newry - 6 seats
Party	Candidate	FPv%	Count					
Party	Candidate	FPv%	1	2	3	4	5	6
Sinn Féin	Valerie Harte*	19.95%	2,085					
Sinn Féin	Cathal King*	18.96%	1,982					
Sinn Féin	Geraldine Kearns*	12.05%	1,259	1,719.88				
Sinn Féin	Aidan Mathers	14.19%	1,483	1,526.96				
SDLP	Michael Savage* †	8.95%	935	949.84	1,151.03	1,192.47	1,203.34	1,382.34
SDLP	Doire Finn	9.20%	961	994.04	1,120.89	1,211.33	1,226.98	1,357.98
Alliance	Helena Young	7.94%	830	845.68	925.33	963.69	988.12	1,199.12
Aontú	Sharon Loughran	3.04%	318	322.20	356.42	372.94	386.24	
UUP	Andrew McCracken	2.72%	285	285.00	287.95	289.35	289.35	
Independent	Mariya Krupska	2.00%	209	213.76	237.95	248.03	272.10	
Workers' Party	Nicola Grant	1.00%	104	106.24	123.94	130.66		
Electorate: 19,901 Valid: 10,451 (52.51%) Spoilt: 172 Quota: 1,494 Turnout: 10,623 (53.38%)

== 2019 Election ==
2014: 3 x Sinn Féin, 2 x SDLP, 1 x Independent

2019: 3 x Sinn Féin, 2 x SDLP, 1 x Independent

2014-2019 Change: No change

Newry - 6 seats
Party	Candidate	FPv%	Count					
Party	Candidate	FPv%	1	2	3	4	5	6
Independent	Gavin Malone	23.19%	2,296					
Sinn Féin	Liz Kimmins* ††	13.88%	1,374	1,450.56				
SDLP	Michael Savage*	12.43%	1,231	1,417.56				
Sinn Féin	Charlie Casey* †	12.42%	1,230	1,345.28	1,347.16	1,843.16		
Sinn Féin	Valerie Harte*	10.56%	1,045	1,131.68	1,132.68	1,363.56	1,776.7	
SDLP	Gary Stokes*	8.87%	878	987.12	1,115.08	1,139.68	1,145.14	1,178.81
Alliance	Helena Young	7.28%	721	924.72	1,049.44	1,084.36	1,093.46	1,137.14
Sinn Féin	Sarah McAllister	7.92%	784	864.08	864.08			
UUP	Ricky McGaffin	3.44%	341	353.76				
Electorate: 19,400 Valid: 9,900 (51.03%) Spoilt: 198 Quota: 1,415 Turnout: 10,098 (52.05%)

== 2014 Election ==
2011: 3 x Sinn Féin, 2 x SDLP, 2 x Independent

2014: 3 x Sinn Féin, 2 x SDLP, 1 x Independent

2011-2014 Change: Independent loss due to the reduction of one seat

Newry - 6 seats
Party	Candidate	FPv%	Count						
Party	Candidate	FPv%	1	2	3	4	5	6	7
Sinn Féin	Charlie Casey*	19.20%	1,693						
Sinn Féin	Liz Kimmins*	17.75%	1,567						
Sinn Féin	Valerie Harte*	14.75%	1,300						
Independent	Davy Hyland*	11.85%	1,045	1,202	1,296.35				
SDLP	Gary Stokes	10.64%	938	981	997.84	1,070.84	1,086.92	1,092.02	1,222.02
SDLP	Kevin McAteer ‡†	7.13%	629	716	764.97	812.03	820.27	832.51	1,153.51
SDLP	Peter McEvoy	7.53%	664	689	767.03	804.06	808.54	817.21	914.21
SDLP	Jacinta Duffy	6.30%	555	664	721.63	791.63	799.31	809.51	
UUP	Joshua Lowry	4.36%	384	387	388.53				
Independent	James Malone	0.47%	41	48	55.14				
Electorate: 18,411 Valid: 8,816 (47.88%) Spoilt: 165 Quota: 1,260 Turnout: 8,981 (48.78%)

== 2011 Election ==
2005: 3 x Sinn Féin, 3 x SDLP, 1 x Independent

2011: 3 x Sinn Féin, 2 x SDLP, 2 x Independent

2005-2011 Change: Independent gain from SDLP

Newry Town - 7 seats
Party	Candidate	FPv%	Count					
Party	Candidate	FPv%	1	2	3	4	5	6
Sinn Féin	Charlie Casey*	16.89%	1,280					
Independent	Davy Hyland	13.29%	1,007					
SDLP	John McArdle*	10.94%	829	846.28	949.28			
Independent	Jack Patterson*	9.91%	751	763.96	778.31	969.31		
Sinn Féin	Valerie Harte	11.76%	891	930.69	935.5	937.5	947.58	986.58
SDLP	Frank Feely*	5.29%	401	411.8	562.23	619.23	624.72	968.72
Sinn Féin	Brendan Curran*	8.34%	632	722.72	740.12	743.39	756.8	822.04
Sinn Féin	Marian O'Reilly*	6.84%	518	654.08	660.16	662.16	673.14	687.49
SDLP	Gary Stokes*	6.84%	518	523.4	542.67	585.67	601.15	
UUP	Colin McElroy	5.60%	424	425.35	426.35			
SDLP	Joe Coyle	4.18%	317	330.23				
Independent	James Malone	0.13%	10	10.81				
Electorate: 13,721 Valid: 7,578 (55.23%) Spoilt: 153 Quota: 948 Turnout: 7,731 (56.34%)

== 2005 Election ==
2001: 3 x Sinn Féin, 3 x SDLP, 1 x Independent

2005: 3 x Sinn Féin, 3 x SDLP, 1 x Independent

2001-2005 Change: No change

Newry Town - 7 seats
Party	Candidate	FPv%	Count							
Party	Candidate	FPv%	1	2	3	4	5	6	7	8
Independent	Jack Patterson*	13.86%	1,186							
Sinn Féin	Charlie Casey*	13.19%	1,128							
SDLP	John McArdle*	10.51%	899	931	955	957.85	1,054.05	1,127.05		
Sinn Féin	Brendan Curran*	8.45%	723	742	756.5	772.6	786.6	788.8	1,116.8	
SDLP	Gary Stokes	6.52%	558	578	595.1	595.85	911.55	993.25	1,029.8	1,036.8
Sinn Féin	Marian Mathers	9.71%	831	847	853.7	878.3	897.55	898.55	984.45	984.45
SDLP	Frank Feely*	7.66%	655	678	692.1	694.1	753.05	869.05	887.85	926.85
Sinn Féin	Ewan Morgan	8.32%	712	732	738.1	741.55	748.75	750.75	875.25	875.25
Sinn Féin	Catherine McMahon	6.79%	581	595	602.2	605.4	614	618		
UUP	David Taylor	6.43%	550	551	553.5	553.55	554.65			
SDLP	Terry Ruddy	5.78%	494	526	543.7	546.1				
Independent	Gerry Markey	2.22%	190							
Independent	Vincent Markey	0.55%	47							
Electorate: 12,827 Valid: 8,554 (66.69%) Spoilt: 202 Quota: 1,070 Turnout: 8,756 (68.26%)

== 2001 Election ==
1997: 2 x Sinn Féin, 2 x SDLP, 1 x UUP, 1 x Independent, 1 x Independent Nationalist

2001: 3 x Sinn Féin, 3 x SDLP, 1 x Independent

1997-2001 Change: Sinn Féin and SDLP gain from UUP and Independent Nationalist

Newry Town - 7 seats
Party	Candidate	FPv%	Count					
Party	Candidate	FPv%	1	2	3	4	5	6
Sinn Féin	Davy Hyland*	12.73%	1,213					
Independent	Jack Patterson*	12.07%	1,150	1,230				
SDLP	Patrick McElroy*	9.97%	950	1,108	1,265			
SDLP	Frank Feely*	9.86%	940	1,134	1,228			
Sinn Féin	Charlie Casey	11.74%	1,119	1,125	1,131	1,131	1,134.65	1,136.03
SDLP	John McArdle	8.51%	811	910	973	1,040.15	1,069.35	1,102.47
Sinn Féin	Brendan Curran*	10.75%	1,025	1,049	1,054	1,054.85	1,056.31	1,057
Sinn Féin	Conor Murphy	10.32%	984	1,005	1,011	1,015.25	1,018.9	1,019.59
UUP	William McCaigue*	7.63%	727	735				
SDLP	Peter McEvoy	5.28%	503					
Independent	Declan O'Callaghan	1.14%	109					
Electorate: 13,657 Valid: 9,531 (69.79%) Spoilt: 265 Quota: 1,192 Turnout: 9,796 (71.73%)

== 1997 Election ==
1993: 3 x SDLP, 2 x Sinn Féin, 1 x UUP, 1 x Independent

1997: 2 x SDLP, 2 x Sinn Féin, 1 x UUP, 1 x Independent, 1 x Independent Nationalist

1993-1997 Change: Independent Nationalist gain from SDLP

Newry Town - 7 seats
Party	Candidate	FPv%	Count				
Party	Candidate	FPv%	1	2	3	4	5
Sinn Féin	Davy Hyland*	13.53%	1,095				
Independent	Jack Patterson*	12.73%	1,030				
Sinn Féin	Brendan Curran*	12.36%	1,000	1,004	1,024.93		
SDLP	Frank Feely*	9.57%	774	795	796.05	1,034.05	
Ind. Nationalist	Eugene Markey	11.48%	929	948	951.5	976.78	1,061.78
SDLP	Patrick McElroy*	9.97%	807	830	833.15	979.22	1,012.22
UUP	William McCaigue*	8.99%	727	763	763.35	768.35	771.98
SDLP	Arthur Ruddy*	6.53%	528	555	556.05	633.26	654.13
Sinn Féin	Anne Marie Willis	6.54%	529	530	572.7	578.98	
SDLP	Mary McKeown	6.07%	491	521	522.33		
Alliance	Pete Whitcroft	2.24%	181				
Electorate: 14,036 Valid: 8,091 (57.64%) Spoilt: 213 Quota: 1,012 Turnout: 8,304 (59.16%)

== 1993 Election ==
1989: 4 x SDLP, 1 x Sinn Féin, 1 x UUP, 1 x Independent Nationalist

1993: 3 x SDLP, 2 x Sinn Féin, 1 x UUP, 1 x Independent

1989-1993 Change: Sinn Féin and Independent gain from SDLP and Independent Nationalist

Newry Town - 7 seats
Party	Candidate	FPv%	Count					
Party	Candidate	FPv%	1	2	3	4	5	6
Sinn Féin	Davy Hyland	12.41%	997	1,002	1,015			
Independent	Jack Patterson	7.44%	598	621	650	800	1,019	
SDLP	Patrick McElroy*	10.33%	830	857	893	913	943	1,014
SDLP	Frank Feely*	8.49%	682	690	704	720	737	1,013
SDLP	Arthur Ruddy*	10.26%	824	841	850	874	932	982
Sinn Féin	Brendan Curran*	10.36%	832	849	863	893	933	958
UUP	William McCaigue*	11.24%	903	911	920	925	939	945
SDLP	Sean Gallogly*	7.94%	638	645	674	695	705	805
SDLP	Patrick Courtney	6.64%	533	542	554	578	601	
Independent	Richard Rodgers	4.92%	395	423	449	505		
Independent	James Markey	4.06%	326	339	384			
Workers' Party	Anthony Hutchinson	3.30%	265	277				
Independent Labour	Noel Sloan	2.61%	210					
Electorate: 13,701 Valid: 8,033 (58.63%) Spoilt: 296 Quota: 1,005 Turnout: 8,329 (60.79%)

== 1989 Election ==
1985: 4 x SDLP, 1 x Sinn Féin, 1 x UUP, 1 x IIP

1989: 4 x SDLP, 1 x Sinn Féin, 1 x UUP, 1 x Independent Nationalist

1985-1989 Change: Independent Nationalist leaves IIP

Newry Town - 7 seats
Party	Candidate	FPv%	Count											
Party	Candidate	FPv%	1	2	3	4	5	6	7	8	9	10	11	12
Ind. Nationalist	Eugene Markey*	11.71%	973	974	1,006	1,039								
Sinn Féin	Brendan Curran*	8.92%	741	741	755	766	770	802	817	1,219				
SDLP	Arthur Ruddy*	10.74%	892	894	907	921	937	975	990	995	1,137			
SDLP	Frank Feely	11.52%	957	961	963	981	995	1,004	1,017	1,023	1,099			
SDLP	Sean Gallogly*	9.84%	818	821	826	837	877	882	905	911	1,023	1,045		
SDLP	Patrick McElroy*	7.39%	614	618	623	627	688	699	722	727	828	840	933.45	988.55
UUP	William McCaigue*	10.41%	865	865	869	871	871	873	882	882	886	888	888.89	889.84
Independent	Louis Morgan	6.44%	535	538	554	569	586	627	687	711	742	821	823.67	827.47
SDLP	John McArdle	5.30%	440	447	450	455	492	499	511	517				
Sinn Féin	Eileen Morgan	5.66%	470	470	473	476	480	484	495					
Workers' Party	Kevin Morgan	3.18%	264	264	271	275	279	295						
Ind. Nationalist	James McKevitt	2.59%	215	217	219	232	236							
SDLP	Teddy McLoughlin	2.43%	202	202	204	206								
Independent	Peter McKevitt	1.84%	153	161	165									
Independent	Noel Sloan	1.61%	134	135										
Independent	Patrick Ruddy	0.43%	36											
Electorate: 13,812 Valid: 8,309 (60.16%) Spoilt: 321 Quota: 1,039 Turnout: 8,630 (62.48%)

== 1985 Election ==
1985: 4 x SDLP, 1 x Sinn Féin, 1 x IIP, 1 x UUP

Newry Town - 7 seats
Party	Candidate	FPv%	Count								
Party	Candidate	FPv%	1	2	3	4	5	6	7	8	9
Irish Independence	Eugene Markey*	13.52%	1,003								
UUP	William McCaigue*	12.64%	938								
SDLP	Sean Gallogly	12.37%	918	921.08	922.15	930.15					
SDLP	Arthur Ruddy*	12.02%	892	896.06	902.27	927.23	929.07				
SDLP	Patrick McElroy*	7.92%	588	592.13	603.34	624.28	626.56	661.65	727.55	743.76	989.76
Sinn Féin	Brendan Curran	9.49%	704	708.9	713.04	734.91	734.91	740.19	778.54	879.5	908.89
SDLP	Thomas McGrath*	7.52%	558	563.25	570.25	583.4	584.52	657.37	696.37	710.79	841.43
Sinn Féin	Sean Mathers	5.12%	380	382.24	383.24	387.8	387.84	391.98	401.05	609.59	614.63
SDLP	John McArdle	5.16%	383	384.26	387.26	398.66	400.02	430.35	471.19	479.33	
Sinn Féin	Deborah Morgan	4.68%	347	350.57	354.57	358.39	358.39	367.53	380.95		
Ind. Nationalist	James McKevitt	3.05%	226	229.85	261.06	292.99	294.31	342.24			
Workers' Party	Tom Moore	3.58%	266	269.29	272.29	282.46	283.9				
Irish Independence	Freddie Kearns*	1.83%	136	167.92	174.2						
Independent	Noel Sloan	1.10%	82	83.12							
Electorate: 12,788 Valid: 7,421 (58.03%) Spoilt: 237 Quota: 928 Turnout: 7,658 (59.88%)
