= 2014 Newry, Mourne and Down District Council election =

2014 Northern Irish local government election

- 22 May 2014

All 41 seats to Newry, Mourne and Down District Council
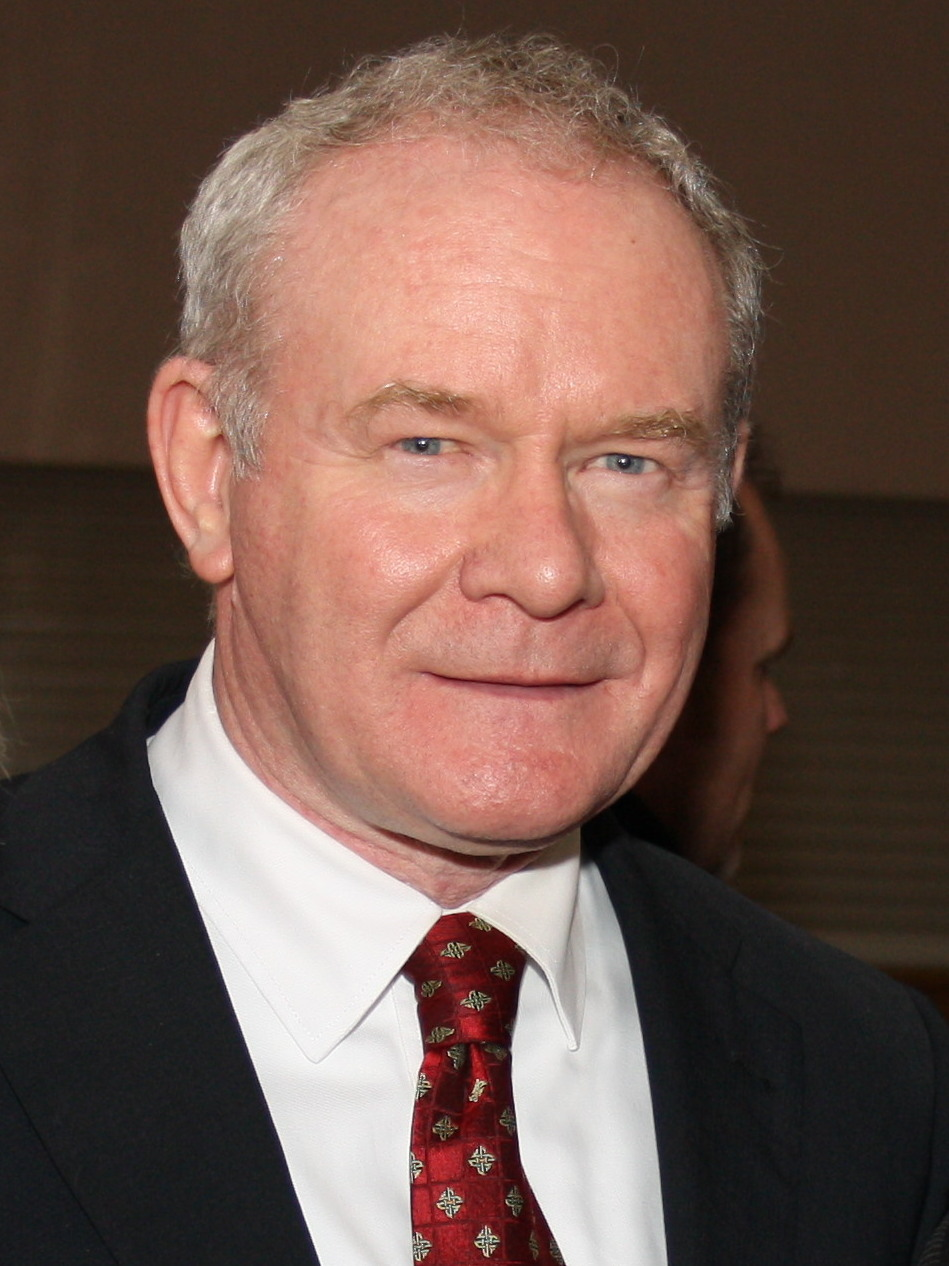

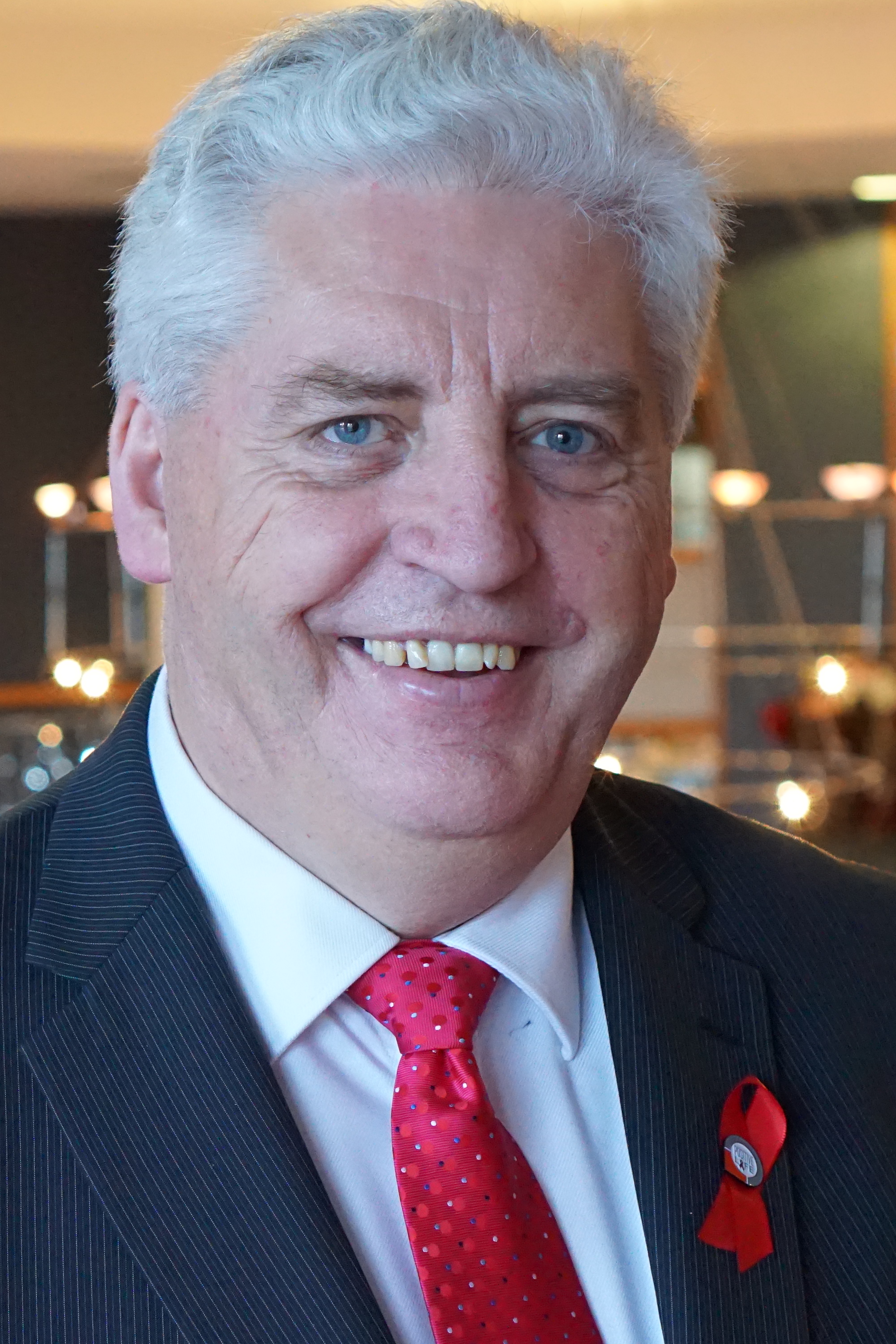

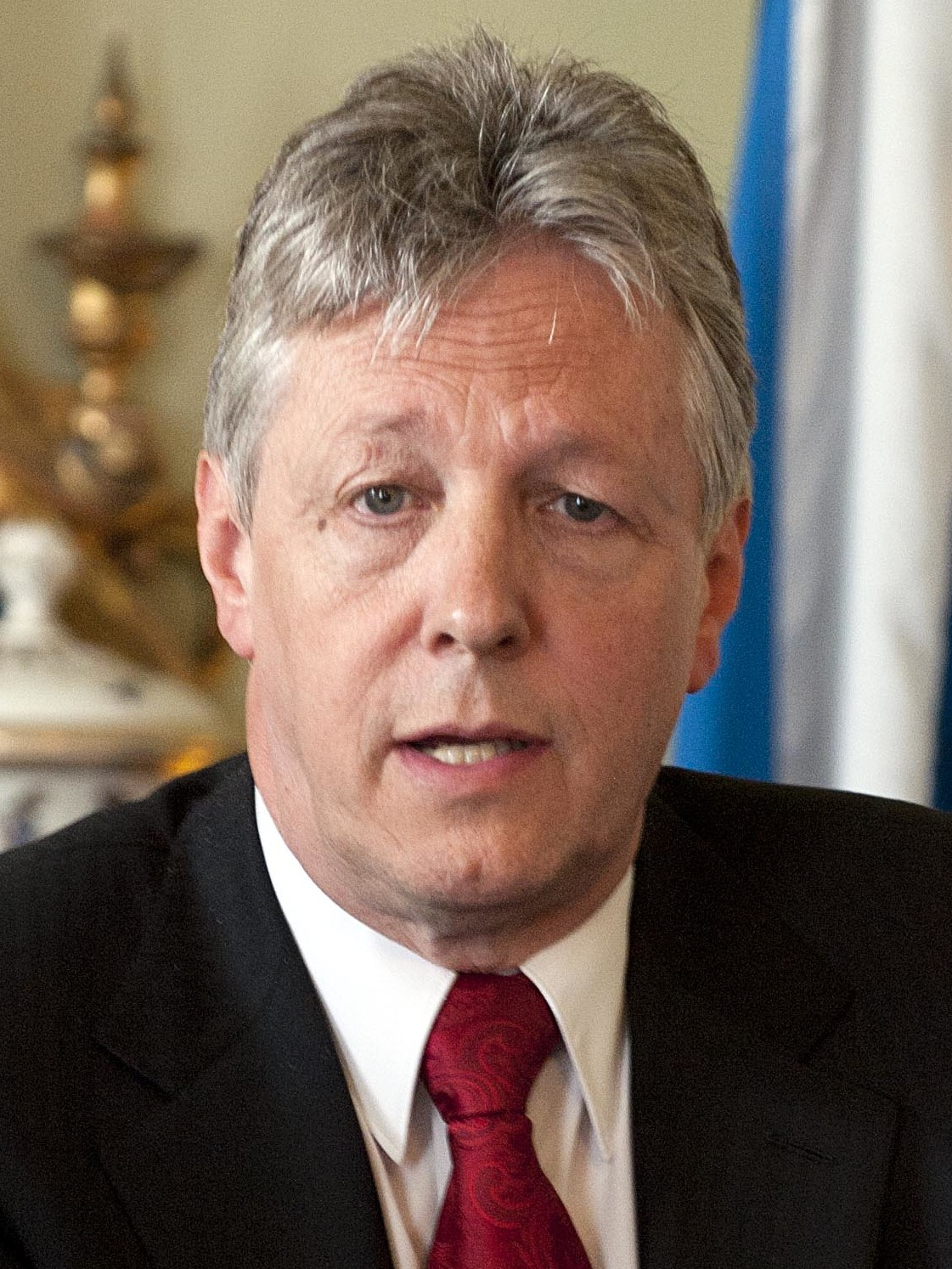

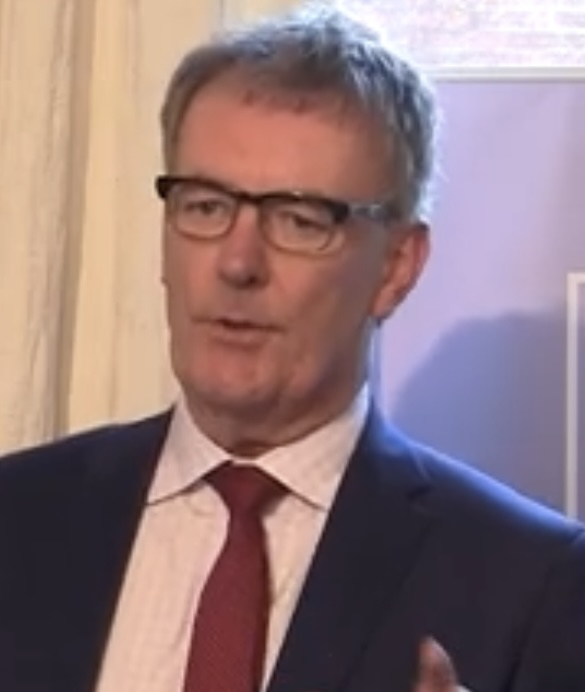

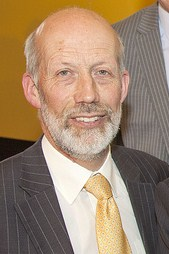

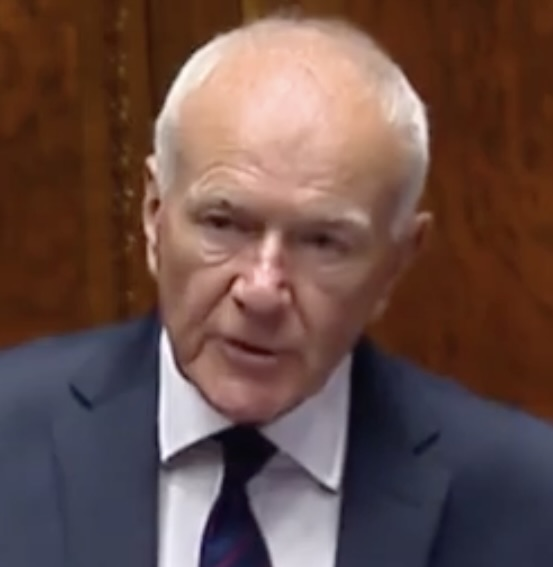
	First party	Second party	Third party
Leader	Martin McGuinness	Alasdair McDonnell	Peter Robinson
Party	Sinn Féin	SDLP	DUP
Seats won	14	14	4
Popular vote	22,611	18,571	4,259
Percentage	37.11%	30.48%	6.99%
	Fourth party	Fifth party	Sixth party
Leader	Mike Nesbitt		David Ford
Party	UUP	Independent	Alliance
Seats won	3	3	2
Popular vote	6,820	3,448	1,460
Percentage	11.19%	5.66%	2.40%
	Seventh party
Leader	David McNarry
Party	UKIP
Seats won	1
Popular vote	2,371
Percentage	3.89%
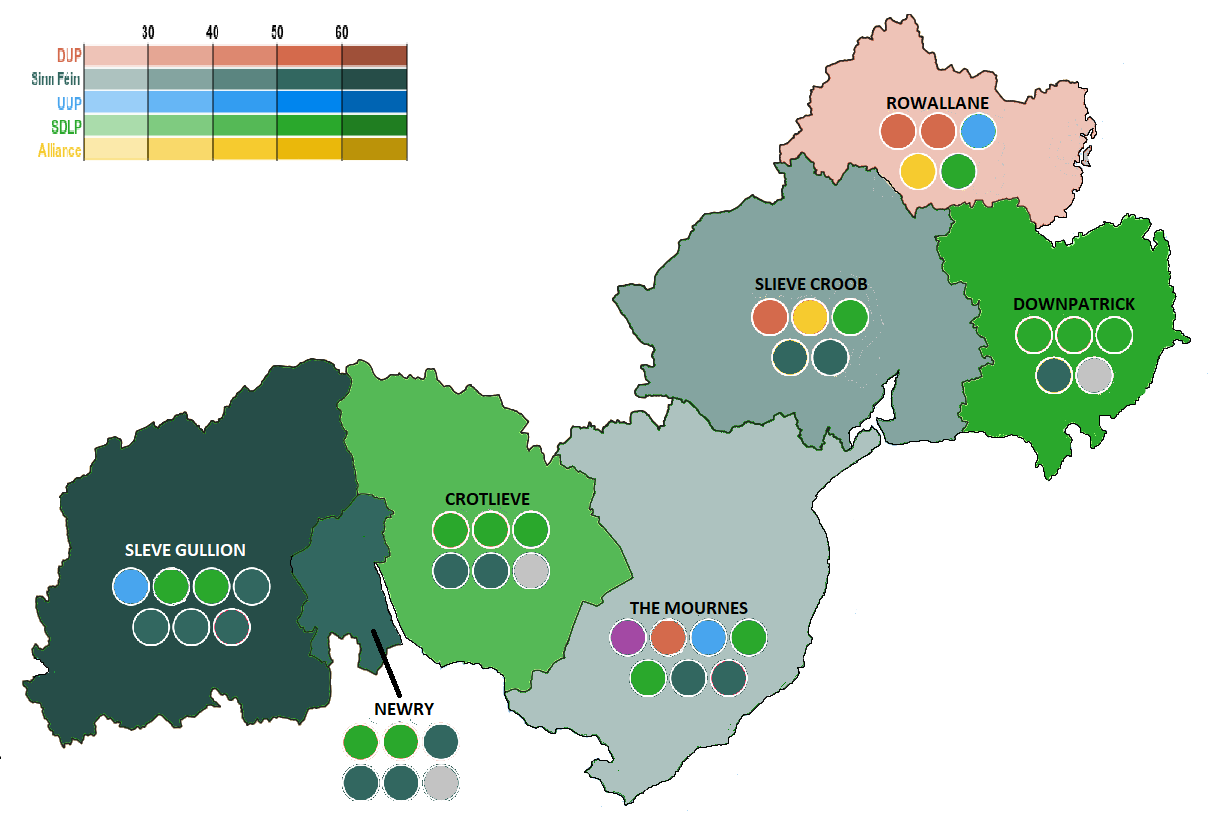
- Newry, Mourne and Down 2014 Council Election Results by DEA (Shaded by plurality of FPVs)
Council control after election
No overall control

The first election to Newry, Mourne and Down District Council, part of the Northern Ireland local elections on 22 May 2014, returned 41 members to the newly formed council via Single Transferable Vote. Sinn Féin and the Social Democratic and Labour Party won the most seats, with 14 each, with Sinn Féin taking a plurality of first-preference votes.

== Results by party ==
Party	Seats	±	First Pref. votes	FPv%	±%
Sinn Féin	14		22,611	37.11	
SDLP	14		18,571	30.48	
DUP	4		4,259	6.99	
UUP	3		6,820	11.19	
Independent	3		3,448	5.66	
Alliance	2		1,460	2.40	
UKIP	1		2,371	3.89	
NI21	0		526	0.86	
TUV	0		433	0.71	
Totals	41		60,922	100.00	—

== Districts summary ==
Results of the Newry, Mourne and Down District Council election, 2014 by district
Ward	%	Cllrs	%	Cllrs	%	Cllrs	%	Cllrs	%	Cllrs	%	Cllrs	%	Cllrs	Total Cllrs
Ward	Sinn Féin		SDLP		DUP		UUP		Alliance		UKIP		Others		Total Cllrs
Crotlieve	34.5	2	43.4	3	2.5	0	9.5	0	0.0	0	0.0	0	10.1	1	6
Downpatrick	28.3	1	50.9	3	2.2	0	5.7	0	0.0	0	0.0	0	12.9	1	5
Newry	51.7	3	31.6	2	0.0	0	4.4	0	0.0	0	0.0	0	12.3	1	6
Rowallane	7.9	0	19.0	1	27.3	2	26.2	1	7.3	1	0.0	0	12.3	0	5
Slieve Croob	32.5	2	24.8	1	14.8	1	10.4	0	10.0	1	5.9	0	1.6	0	5
Slieve Gullion	62.2	4	23.3	2	3.4	0	11.1	1	0.0	0	0.0	0	0.0	0	7
The Mournes	28.5	2	23.8	2	9.0	1	17.0	1	2.4	0	18.1	1	1.2	0	7
Total	37.1	14	30.4	14	7.6	4	12.0	3	2.4	2	3.9	1	6.6	3	41

== District results ==
=== Crotlieve ===
2014: 3 x SDLP, 2 x Sinn Féin, 1 x Independent

Crotlieve - 6 seats
Party	Candidate	FPv%	Count							
Party	Candidate	FPv%	1	2	3	4	5	6	7	8
SDLP	Declan McAteer*	14.19%	1,389	1,403						
SDLP	Michael Carr*	10.30%	1,008	1,068	1,401					
Sinn Féin	Sinead Ennis* †	13.57%	1,328	1,333	1,344	1,344.4	1,344.9	1,812.9		
Sinn Féin	Mickey Ruane*	12.21%	1,195	1,232	1,286	1,286.4	1,286.9	1,519.9		
SDLP	Gillian Fitzpatrick*	11.21%	1,097	1,109	1,289	1,290.6	1,290.6	1,337.6	1,431.6	
Independent	Jarlath Tinnelly	7.56%	740	856	941	941.8	942.8	1,067.8	1,149.8	1,230.8
UUP	William Mitchell	9.53%	933	1,136	1,143	1,143.8	1,143.8	1,149.8	1,150.8	1,155.8
Sinn Féin	Mark Gibbons	8.76%	858	867	941	941	941			
SDLP	Connaire McGreevy*	7.73%	757	771						
Independent	Finbarr Lambe	2.64%	258							
DUP	Wilma McCullough	2.31%	226							
Electorate: 18,279 Valid: 9,789 (53.55%) Spoilt: 148 Quota: 1,399 Turnout: 9,937 (54.36%)

=== Downpatrick ===
2014: 3 x SDLP, 1 x Sinn Féin, 1 x Independent

Downpatrick - 5 seats
Party	Candidate	FPv%	Count			
Party	Candidate	FPv%	1	2	3	4
SDLP	Colin McGrath* †	19.63%	1,279			
SDLP	Dermot Curran*	16.52%	1,076	1,226		
SDLP	Gareth Sharvin*	14.75%	961	1,034	1,170.35	
Independent	Cadogan Enright*	12.88%	839	978	997.05	1,052.05
Sinn Féin	Naomi Bailie	15.83%	1,031	1,032	1,045.35	1,049.35
Sinn Féin	Eamonn McConvey*	12.45%	811	812	829.4	833.4
UUP	Graham Furey	5.73%	373			
DUP	Yvonne Moore	2.21%	144			
Electorate: 14,000 Valid: 6,514 (46.53%) Spoilt: 98 Quota: 1,086 Turnout: 6,612 (47.23%)

=== Newry ===
2014: 3 x Sinn Féin, 2 x SDLP, 1 x Independent

Newry - 6 seats
Party	Candidate	FPv%	Count						
Party	Candidate	FPv%	1	2	3	4	5	6	7
Sinn Féin	Charlie Casey*	19.20%	1,693						
Sinn Féin	Liz Kimmins*	17.75%	1,567						
Sinn Féin	Valerie Harte*	14.75%	1,300						
Independent	Davy Hyland*	11.85%	1,045	1,202	1,296.35				
SDLP	Gary Stokes	10.64%	938	981	997.84	1,070.84	1,086.92	1,092.02	1,222.02
SDLP	Kevin McAteer ‡†	7.13%	629	716	764.97	812.03	820.27	832.51	1,153.51
SDLP	Peter McEvoy	7.53%	664	689	767.03	804.06	808.54	817.21	914.21
SDLP	Jacinta Duffy	6.30%	555	664	721.63	791.63	799.31	809.51	
UUP	Joshua Lowry	4.36%	384	387	388.53				
Independent	James Malone	0.47%	41	48	55.14				
Electorate: 18,411 Valid: 8,816 (47.88%) Spoilt: 165 Quota: 1,260 Turnout: 8,981 (48.78%)

=== Rowallane ===
2014: 2 x DUP, 1 x UUP, 1 x SDLP, 1 x Alliance

Rowallane - 5 seats
Party	Candidate	FPv%	Count					
Party	Candidate	FPv%	1	2	3	4	5	6
SDLP	Terry Andrews*	19.02%	1,321					
UUP	Robert Burgess*	16.49%	1,145	1,153.45	1,202.45			
DUP	Harry Harvey	13.71%	952	958.89	982.54	1,139.1	1,144.1	1,148.1
DUP	Billy Walker*	13.58%	943	959.64	980.94	1,070.98	1,072.98	1,081.98
Alliance	Patrick Brown	7.34%	510	563.95	710.97	723.36	734.36	992.36
UUP	Walter Lyons*	9.68%	672	674.86	699.64	873.81	898.81	913.81
Sinn Féin	Eddie Hughes	7.95%	552	595.68	689.88	692.01	692.01	
TUV	Philip Hamilton	6.24%	433	437.81	456.46			
NI21	Alistair Straney	3.85%	267	275.19				
Independent	Mickey Coogan*	2.15%	149	160.31				
Electorate: 14,526 Valid: 6,944 (49.54%) Spoilt: 78 Quota: 1,158 Turnout: 7,022 (50.44%)

=== Slieve Croob ===
2014: 2 x Sinn Féin, 1 x SDLP, 1 x DUP, 1 x Alliance

Slieve Croob - 5 seats
Party	Candidate	FPv%	Count						
Party	Candidate	FPv%	1	2	3	4	5	6	7
Sinn Féin	Stephen Burns* †	18.87%	1,303						
DUP	Garth Craig*	14.78%	1,021	1,028	1,028	1,166			
SDLP	Mark Murnin	11.35%	784	794	794	797	929.16	1,261.16	
Sinn Féin	Pól Ó Gribín †	13.61%	940	948	1,042.44	1,046.44	1,072	1,164	
Alliance	Patrick Clarke †	9.99%	690	738	749.04	771.04	807.84	971.84	1,068.59
UUP	Desmond Patterson*	10.40%	718	727	733.6	932.6	934.6	955.08	967.08
SDLP	Audrey Byrne	7.44%	514	521	544.88	551.88	781.76		
SDLP	Shane King	6.05%	418	425	438.68	445.8			
UKIP	Alan Lewis	5.89%	407	413	413.24				
NI21	Matthew Morrison	1.61%	111						
Electorate: 13,939 Valid: 6,906 (47.80%) Spoilt: 125 Quota: 1,152 Turnout: 7,031 (50.44%)

=== Slieve Gullion ===
2014: 4 x Sinn Féin, 2 x SDLP, 1 x UUP

Slieve Gullion - 7 seats
Party	Candidate	FPv%	Count						
Party	Candidate	FPv%	1	2	3	4	5	6	7
Sinn Féin	Terry Hearty*	19.14%	2,135						
SDLP	Geraldine Donnelly* †	13.59%	1,516						
Sinn Féin	Mickey Larkin*	12.65%	1,411						
Sinn Féin	Barra Ó Muirí*	10.92%	1,218	1,773.12					
UUP	David Taylor*	11.14%	1,243	1,246.24	1,599.24				
Sinn Féin	Róisín Mulgrew*	11.46%	1,278	1,312.56	1,312.92	1,632.87			
SDLP	Kate Loughran	9.66%	1,078	1,106.44	1,110.44	1,122.05	1,123.65	1,248.65	1,345.61
Sinn Féin	Dáire Hughes	8.06%	899	1,004.84	1,011.2	1,055.48	1,283.68	1,283.68	1,294.48
DUP	Lavelle McIlwrath	3.37%	376	377.8					
Electorate: 19,834 Valid: 11,154 (56.24%) Spoilt: 216 Quota: 1,395 Turnout: 11,370 (57.33%)

=== The Mournes ===
2014: 2 x Sinn Féin, 2 x SDLP, 1 x UKIP, 1 x UUP, 1 x DUP

The Mournes - 7 seats
Party	Candidate	FPv%	Count					
Party	Candidate	FPv%	1	2	3	4	5	6
UKIP	Henry Reilly* ‡	18.07%	1,964					
SDLP	Laura Devlin*	16.45%	1,789					
Sinn Féin	Willie Clarke*	14.55%	1,581					
Sinn Féin	Seán Doran*	13.92%	1,513					
UUP	Harold McKee*†	12.44%	1,352	1,677.5				
SDLP	Brian Quinn*	7.32%	796	804.06	1,131.3	1,134.4	1,291.72	1,416.72
DUP	Glyn Hanna	8.95%	973	1,161.17	1,168.73	1,307.61	1,311.52	1,321.52
UUP	Jill Macauley*	4.55%	494	550.42	556.36	727.48	728.86	752.86
Alliance	Ciaran McAvoy	2.39%	260	263.41	322.81	324.67	368.83	
NI21	Annette Holden	1.36%	148	153.27	168.39	169.32	183.58	
Electorate: 20,008 Valid: 10,869 (54.32%) Spoilt: 173 Quota: 1,359 Turnout: 11,042 (55.19%)

* Incumbent

== Changes during the term ==
=== † Co-options ===
Date	Electoral area	Party	Outgoing	Co-optee	Reason
25 Jan 2016	Slieve Gullion	SDLP	Geraldine Donnelly	Pete Byrne	Donnelly retired.
31 May 2016	Downpatrick	SDLP	Colin McGrath	John Trainor	McGrath elected to the Assembly.
16 Nov 2016	Slieve Croob	Alliance	Patrick Clarke	Andrew McMurray	Clarke ejected from council.
13 Apr 2017	Crotlieve	Sinn Féin	Sinéad Ennis	Oksana McMahon	Ennis elected to the Assembly.
30 Apr 2017	The Mournes	UUP	Harold McKee	Jill Macauley	McKee elected to the Assembly.
26 Aug 2017	Newry	SDLP	Kevin McAteer (Ind.)	Michael Savage	McAteer resigned.
22 Jan 2018	Slieve Croob	Sinn Féin	Pól O Gríbín	John Rice	O Gríbín resigned.
14 Feb 2018	Slieve Croob	Sinn Féin	Stephen Burns	Róisín Howell	Burns resigned.

=== ‡ Changes in affiliation ===
Date	Electoral area	Name	Previous affiliation	New affiliation	Circumstance
3 Apr 2015	Newry	Kevin McAteer	SDLP	Independent	Resigned.
2 Nov 2015	The Mournes	Henry Reilly	UKIP	Independent	Expelled.
26 Aug 2017	Newry	Vacancy	Independent	SDLP	McAteer's seat returned to the SDLP.

Last updated 25 March 2019.

Current composition: see Newry, Mourne and Down District Council.
