= Jim McAllister =

Irish activist and politician (1944-2013)

James McAllister
- Born: 18 September 1943; Crossmaglen, County Armagh
- Died: April 9, 2013 (aged 69); Crossmaglen, County Armagh
- Other name: Jim McAllister
- Occupation: Politician
- Years active: 1974-2013

James McAllister (18 September 1943 – 9 April 2013), known as Jim McAllister, was an Irish republican activist and former politician from Ireland.

== Early life ==
Jim McAllister was born on the Square in Crossmaglen in September 1943, one of seven children to Robbie McAllister, a cobbler, and his wife Katie.

McAllister first became involved in the republican movement in the 1950s, at the end of the Border Campaign. McAllister joined Sinn Féin in 1962 as he wanted to fight injustice. In his late teens, McAllister emigrated to Britain, where he worked in the building trade. He returned to South Armagh in 1974 and soon became a leading figure in Sinn Féin. During the 1981 Irish hunger strike, he became a full-time activist.

His uncle, Johnnie Faughey, fought in the Irish War of Independence in the early 1920s.

== Political career ==
At the 1982 Northern Ireland Assembly election, McAllister was elected in Armagh. He stood for the Westminster seat of Newry and Armagh at the 1983 general election, taking 20% of the votes cast, but his vote share fell to 13.2% at the 1986 Newry and Armagh by-election, and to 11.8% at the 1987 general election.

McAllister was one of the first wave of Sinn Féin councillors to be elected in Northern Ireland in modern times, taking a seat on Newry and Mourne District Council, representing Slieve Gullion, at the 1985 Northern Ireland local elections, a seat he held in 1989 and 1993. He left Sinn Féin and stood down as a councillor in 1993, in protest at their advocacy of a Provisional Irish Republican Army (IRA) ceasefire and their participation in the Northern Ireland Assembly.

Described by author Toby Harnden as "The authentic voice of republicanism in South Armagh," McAllister supported the end of the IRA ceasefire in February 1996. He said: "Within active republicans the feeling became as those months passed by that there was definitely nothing going to come out of it. And the feeling then became: 'Give it another month, give it another two months, then we'll see.' When Canary Wharf (Docklands) did come there was no great sadness; it was what they expected. And there was also very, very strong attitude amongst the people here that that's the place for the bombs: 'London, keep them over there. I don't want one, I've had enough of them, bang it out to hell over there.' Genuinely there was no great sorrow for London. None."

McAllister was a regular speaker at events and often gave funeral orations. He delivered an oration at Milltown Cemetery for the Provisional IRA volunteer Thomas Begley who died during the Shankill bombing in October 1993.

== Paul Quinn Campaign ==
McAllister led the campaign for justice for Paul Quinn, a 21-year-old man from South Armagh who was brutally beaten to death in a barn in Oram, County Monaghan, where a dozen men who were members of the Provisional IRA were waiting in black military-style clothing after he was lured over the border in October 2007.

== Ceasefire ==
Later, however, he opposed the direction in which Sinn Féin was leading the Irish republican movement. In 1998, he stated: "There's an unsureness of where we're going, even a questioning of who we are, which is a new thing. I've read the damn thing The Good Friday Agreement and I believe it offers nothing whatsoever for republicans. To say this deal is transitional towards a united Ireland, that is bollocks. People had a genuine belief that this was an attempt to address the core issue of the British presence, which it never was."

In the 2000s, McAllister campaigned against what he viewed as Provisional IRA intimidation in South Armagh. In 2008, his son, Turloch McAllister, was charged with possessing explosives and alleged involvement in a dissident republican group. He was convicted in 2010 and sentenced to 12 years for grinding down fertiliser to be used in making pipe bombs.

He died on 9 April 2013 of cancer at his home. His son Turloch was eventually allowed compassionate leave for the funeral at Cullyhanna, South Armagh.

Northern Ireland Assembly (1982)
New assembly	MPA for Armagh; 1982–1986	Assembly abolished
