= Davy Hyland =

Irish republican politician (born 1955)

Member of Newry, Mourne and Down District Council
- In office 22 May 2014 – 2 May 2019
- Preceded by: Council established
- Succeeded by: Gavin Malone
- Constituency: Newry

Member of Newry and Mourne District Council
- In office 5 May 2011 – 22 May 2014
- Preceded by: Marian Mathers
- Succeeded by: Council abolished
- Constituency: Newry Town
- In office 19 May 1993 – 5 May 2005
- Preceded by: Eugene Markey
- Succeeded by: Marian Mathers
- Constituency: Newry Town

Member of the Northern Ireland Assembly for Newry and Armagh
- In office 26 November 2003 – 7 March 2007
- Preceded by: Pat McNamee
- Succeeded by: Mickey Brady

Personal details
- Born: 25 February 1955 (age 71) Belfast, Northern Ireland
- Party: Independent Republican (2007 - present)
- Other political affiliations: Sinn Féin (until 2007)
- Education: Aberystwyth University, University of Manchester
- Website: North Antrim Sinn Féin

Davy Hyland (born 25 February 1955, Belfast) is an Irish republican former politician who was a Sinn Féin Member of the Northern Ireland Assembly (MLA) for Newry and Armagh from 2003 to 2007.

== Background ==
He was educated at the University of Wales Aberystwyth and Manchester University. He is a Teacher

He now lives in Newry where he is a former chair of Newry and Mourne District Council and a former Assembly member for Newry and Armagh.

In the mid-1980s, Hyland appeared in court accused of killing former Royal Ulster Constabulary Inspector Albert White but the case collapsed after supergrass Eamon Collins withdrew statements made to police

He was deselected by Sinn Féin before running for the 2007 Assembly election, having received only three votes out of 63 cast by the party membership present at the selection convention. His deselection came amid internal disquiet about moves to discuss the acceptance of the new policing arrangements in Northern Ireland following the establishment of the Police Service of Northern Ireland (PSNI) as a result of the Patten Commission which was established as part of the ongoing peace process. Hyland stated that: "There are people out there who see this all being choreographed by the Sinn Féin leadership and that it is only a matter of time before the Sinn Féin ard fheis is called and a decision made to back policing arrangements". On 2 February 2007, he announced formally through the Irish News newspaper that he would run in the 2007 Assembly election in Newry and Armagh as an independent republican opposed to Sinn Féin's acceptance of the PSNI. He was backed by other prominent former Sinn Féin figures such as former Assembly members Pat MacNamee and Jim McAllister. Hyland failed to be elected, gaining 2,188 votes (4.4%).

In 2022, while campaigning for the Northern Ireland Assembly elections on behalf of independent Newry City Councillor, Gavin Malone, Hyland was observed on a constituent’s Ring video door bell removing other candidates’ election literature and placing it in the constituent’s wheelie bin. As a result, Malone announced on social media platforms that the member of his team in question was removed from his campaign group with immediate effect.

== Council Elections ==
On the 9 May 2011, Davy was elected to the Newry and Mourne District Council as an independent. He was also elected in May 2014 as an Independent Republican in the 2014 Newry, Mourne and Down District Council election.

In 2016 he was instrumental in setting up Anam 1916/2016, a group tasked with commemorating the Easter Rising of 1916 in the local area.

=== External links ===
- NI Assembly page

=== References ===
Northern Ireland Assembly
Preceded by Pat McNamee	MLA for Newry and Armagh; 2003–2007	Succeeded by Mickey Brady

- https://web.archive.org/web/20140415120109/http://www.newrydemocrat.com/articles/news/38819/hyland-hits-out-at-psnis-political-policing-arrest/
