= Danny Kennedy (politician) =

Northern Irish politician (born 1959)

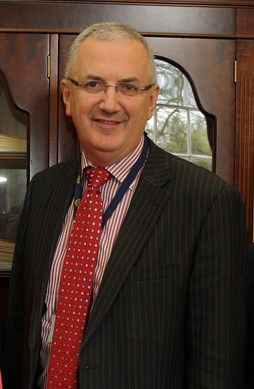

Chairman of the Ulster Unionist Party
- In office 23 December 2019 – 21 May 2022
- Leader: Steve Aiken; Doug Beattie
- Preceded by: Reg Empey
- Succeeded by: Jill Macauley

Deputy Speaker of the Northern Ireland Assembly
- In office 11 May 2016 – 29 June 2017
- Preceded by: Roy Beggs Jr
- Succeeded by: Roy Beggs Jr

Minister for Regional Development
- In office 16 May 2011 – 1 September 2015
- First Minister: Peter Robinson
- Preceded by: Conor Murphy
- Succeeded by: Michelle McIlveen

Minister for Employment and Learning
- In office 27 October 2010 – 5 May 2011
- First Minister: Peter Robinson
- Preceded by: Sir Reg Empey
- Succeeded by: Stephen Farry

Member of the Legislative Assembly for Newry and Armagh
- In office 25 June 1998 – 26 January 2017
- Preceded by: Constituency created
- Succeeded by: Seat abolished

Member of Newry and Mourne District Council
- In office 15 May 1985 – 5 May 2011
- Preceded by: District created
- Succeeded by: David Taylor
- Constituency: The Fews

Northern Ireland Forum Member for Newry and Armagh
- In office 30 May 1996 – 25 April 1998
- Preceded by: Forum established
- Succeeded by: Forum dissolved

Personal details
- Born: 6 July 1959 (age 66) Bessbrook, Northern Ireland
- Party: Ulster Unionist Party
- Spouse: Karen
- Children: 3

Danny Kennedy (born 6 July 1959) is a Northern Irish unionist politician who served as Chairman of the Ulster Unionist Party (UUP) from December 2019 to May 2022. Kennedy previously served as a Member of the Legislative Assembly (MLA) for Newry and Armagh from 1998 to 2017.

He was formerly deputy leader of the Ulster Unionist Party Assembly Group. He served in the Northern Ireland Executive as Minister for Regional Development from 2011 to 2015. On 12 May 2016, Kennedy was elected as Deputy Speaker of the Northern Ireland Assembly. It was confirmed that he had lost his seat as an MLA for Newry and Armagh on 3 March 2017.

== Political career ==
Kennedy has served at all levels, both local and within the wider party organisation of the Ulster Unionist Party, which he joined in 1974. In 1996 he was an unsuccessful candidate in the Northern Ireland Forum election in Newry and Armagh. He ran unsuccessfully for the UUP in the Westminster election in 1997, in which he polled over 18,000 votes against Seamus Mallon. He was elected to the Assembly in 1998.

Kennedy was UUP Assembly spokesman for education and chaired the Assembly Committee which both scrutinised and helped frame education legislation between 1998 and 2002. On the restoration of devolution in 2007 he became chairman of the Committee for the Office of the First Minister and deputy First Minister. His performance in this office garnered him the award for "Best Committee Chair" from the Slugger O'Toole blogsite in 2008.

Kennedy did not appeal an employment tribunal decision that found that a Protestant job applicant, Alan Lennon, had been discriminated against by Kennedy's predecessor Conor Murphy. Lennon was awarded £150,000 damages.

He contested the constituency of Newry and Armagh for the UUP in the 2005, 2010, and 2015 general elections, finishing fourth, third and second with 13.9%, 19.1% and 32.7% of the vote respectively.

Kennedy lost his seat as an MLA in the 2017 Northern Ireland Assembly election, which was held on 2 March 2017.

At the 2019 European Parliament election, he was the UUP's candidate for Northern Ireland.

On 23 December 2019, Kennedy was appointed as chairman of the UUP, replacing Lord Empey.

Northern Ireland Assembly
New assembly	MLA for Newry and Armagh; 1998–2017	Seat abolished
Preceded by Roy Beggs Jr; John Dallat	Deputy Speaker; 2016–2017; With: Patsy McGlone	Vacant Assembly suspended
Party political offices
Preceded by Sir Reg Empey	Deputy Leader of the Ulster Unionist Party; 2005–2010	Succeeded by John McCallister
Preceded by Sir Reg Empey	Chairman of the Ulster Unionist Party; 2019–present	Incumbent
Political offices
Preceded by Sir Reg Empey	Minister for Employment and Learning; 2010–2011	Succeeded by Stephen Farry
Preceded by Conor Murphy	Minister for Regional Development; 2011–2015	Succeeded by Michelle McIlveen
