= Frank Feely =

Irish politician and teacher

Member of Newry and Mourne District Council
- In office 17 May 1989 – 22 May 2014
- Preceded by: Thomas McGrath
- Succeeded by: Council abolished
- Constituency: Newry Town

Northern Ireland Forum Member for Newry and Armagh
- In office 30 May 1996 – 25 April 1998
- Preceded by: New forum
- Succeeded by: Forum dissolved

Member of the Northern Ireland Assembly for South Down
- In office 20 October 1982 – 1986
- Preceded by: Assembly re-established
- Succeeded by: Assembly dissolved
- In office 28 June 1973 – 1974
- Preceded by: Assembly founded
- Succeeded by: Assembly abolished

Member of the Constitutional Convention for South Down
- In office 1975–1976
- Preceded by: Convention created
- Succeeded by: Convention dissolved

Personal details
- Born: 1937 (age 88–89) Newry, Northern Ireland
- Party: Social Democratic and Labour

Frank Feely (born 1937) is a former Irish Social Democratic and Labour Party (SDLP) politician and teacher in Northern Ireland.

== Background ==
Feely worked as a teacher in Newry. At the 1973 Northern Ireland Assembly election, he was elected for the Social Democratic and Labour Party (SDLP) in South Down. He held this seat at the Northern Ireland Constitutional Convention, and at the 1982 Assembly election. In common with other SDLP members, he did not take his seat on the Constitutional Convention, and instead acted as an alternate at the New Ireland Forum.

He was elected to Newry and Mourne District Council in 1989 representing Newry Town, and has held his seat at each subsequent election.

In 1996, Feely was elected to the Northern Ireland Forum, representing Newry and Armagh, but he was not able to hold his seat at the 1998 Assembly election.

In the late 1990s, Feely was Vice Chairman of the District Council, and played a prominent role in Newry's successful bid for city status. Following this, he became the first Mayor of Newry.

In November 2005, Feely and sixteen other nationalist councillors were jointly surcharged £10,000 and barred from public office for five years for refusing FAIR the use of Newtownhamilton Community Centre. This was overturned on appeal, but left five of the councillors including Feely to share a large legal bill.

From 2007 on, Feely has worked as a field canvasser for Citizen's Campaign for the Environment in the United States.

Feely sits on the East Border Region Committee, the Carlingford / Foyle Loughs Commission and the Rural Communities Network (NI).

In 2015, during the Reform of local government in Northern Ireland, where Newry and Mourne District Council was made defunct and the new Newry, Mourne and Down District Council was established, Feeley, along with a number of other councillors decided not to run for election to the new "super council" and therefore became retired as of 1 April 2015.

Northern Ireland Assembly (1973)
New assembly	Assembly Member for South Down; 1973–1974	Assembly abolished
Northern Ireland Constitutional Convention
New convention	Member for South Down; 1975–1976	Convention dissolved
Northern Ireland Assembly (1982)
New assembly	MPA for South Down; 1982–1986	Assembly abolished
Northern Ireland Forum
New forum	Member for Newry and Armagh; 1996–1998	Forum dissolved
Civic offices
New title	Mayor of Newry; 2003	Succeeded by Jackie Patterson
