= P. J. Bradley =

Northern Irish politician (1940–2017)

Member of the Northern Ireland Assembly for Down South
- In office 25 June 1998 – 2011
- Preceded by: New Creation
- Succeeded by: Karen McKevitt

Personal details
- Born: Peadar John Bradley; 28 April 1940 Warrenpoint, County Down, Northern Ireland
- Died: 1 March 2017 (aged 76)
- Party: Social Democratic and Labour Party
- Spouse: Leontia Martin
- Website: http://www.pjbradley.com/

Peadar John Bradley (28 April 1940 – 1 March 2017) was a Social Democratic and Labour Party (SDLP) politician who was a Member of the Northern Ireland Assembly (MLA) for South Down from 1998 to 2011. He was the SDLP Spokesperson for Agriculture and Rural Development and Deputy Whip of the Assembly's SDLP grouping.

Bradley was elected to Newry and Mourne District Council in 1981. He stepped down from the council in 2005.

His daughter, Sinéad, won his MLA seat in 2016. He died on 1 March 2017, at the age of 76.

Northern Ireland Assembly
New assembly	MLA for Down South; 1998 – 2011	Succeeded by Karen McKevitt
