= John Fee (politician) =

British politician

Member of the Northern Ireland Assembly for Newry and Armagh
- In office 25 June 1998 – 26 November 2003
- Preceded by: New Creation
- Succeeded by: Patricia O'Rawe

Personal details
- Born: 7 December 1963 Newry, County Down, Northern Ireland
- Died: 11 November 2007 (aged 43) Crossmaglen, South Armagh, Northern Ireland
- Party: SDLP
- Education: Queen's University Belfast

John Fitzgerald Fee (7 December 1963 – 10 November 2007) was an Irish nationalist politician who served as a Social Democratic and Labour Party (SDLP) Member of the Northern Ireland Assembly (MLA) for Newry and Armagh from 1998 to 2003.

== Career ==
Born in Newry, County Down, Fee was educated at St Patrick's Primary School in Crossmaglen, South Armagh, and St Colman's College, Newry before attending Queen's University Belfast. He worked as the Editor of the Creggan Historical Journal from 1986 before in 1988 becoming the Parliamentary Research Assistant to Seamus Mallon, the Social Democratic and Labour Party (SDLP) Member of Parliament for Newry and Armagh.

Fee was elected to Newry and Mourne District Council for the SDLP in 1989, and in 1998 was chosen as one of Northern Ireland's representatives on the European Committee of the Regions. He served on the Rural Development Council for Northern Ireland from 1990 to 1994. Fee was physically assaulted, apparently by republicans in 1994, shortly after he made criticisms of the IRA over a mortar attack carried out in his home village of Crossmaglen.

In 1996 he was an unsuccessful candidate in the Northern Ireland Forum election in Newry and Armagh. At the 1998 Northern Ireland Assembly election, he was elected for Newry and Armagh. He sat on the Assembly Commission, which was in charge of the Assembly's organisation and financial management; as such he introduced the Financial Assistance for Political Parties Bill, which became the first Bill to pass into law through the Assembly.

He lost his Assembly seat at the 2003 election. He did not contest his council seat in 2005.

== Death ==
Fee died on 10 November 2007 as a result of a brain tumour.

Northern Ireland Assembly
New assembly	MLA for Newry and Armagh; 1998–2003	Succeeded by Patricia O'Rawe
