= 2019 Newry, Mourne and Down District Council election =

2019 Northern Ireland local election

- 2 May 2019

All 41 seats to Newry, Mourne and Down District Council
- Turnout: 55.25%
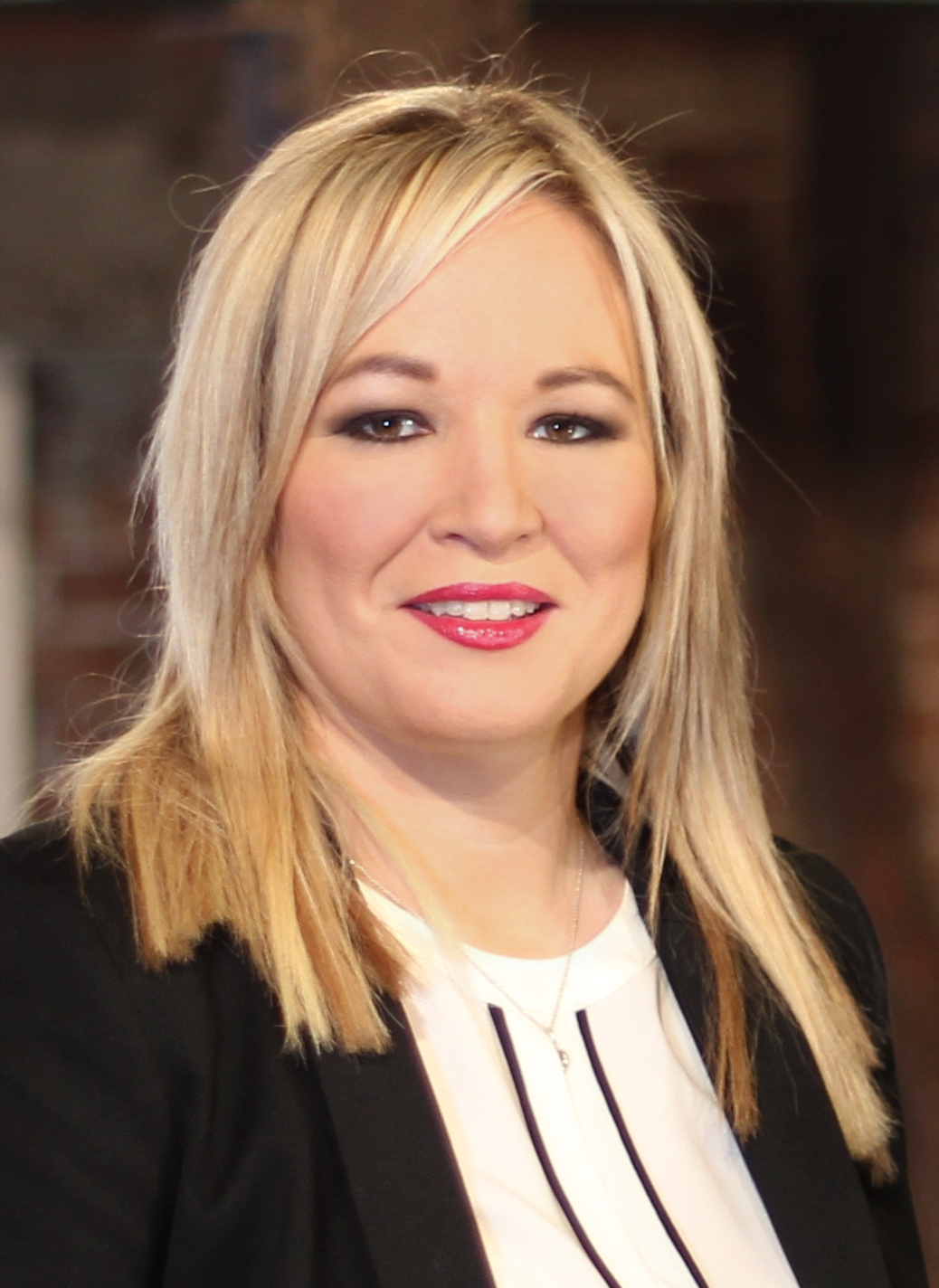

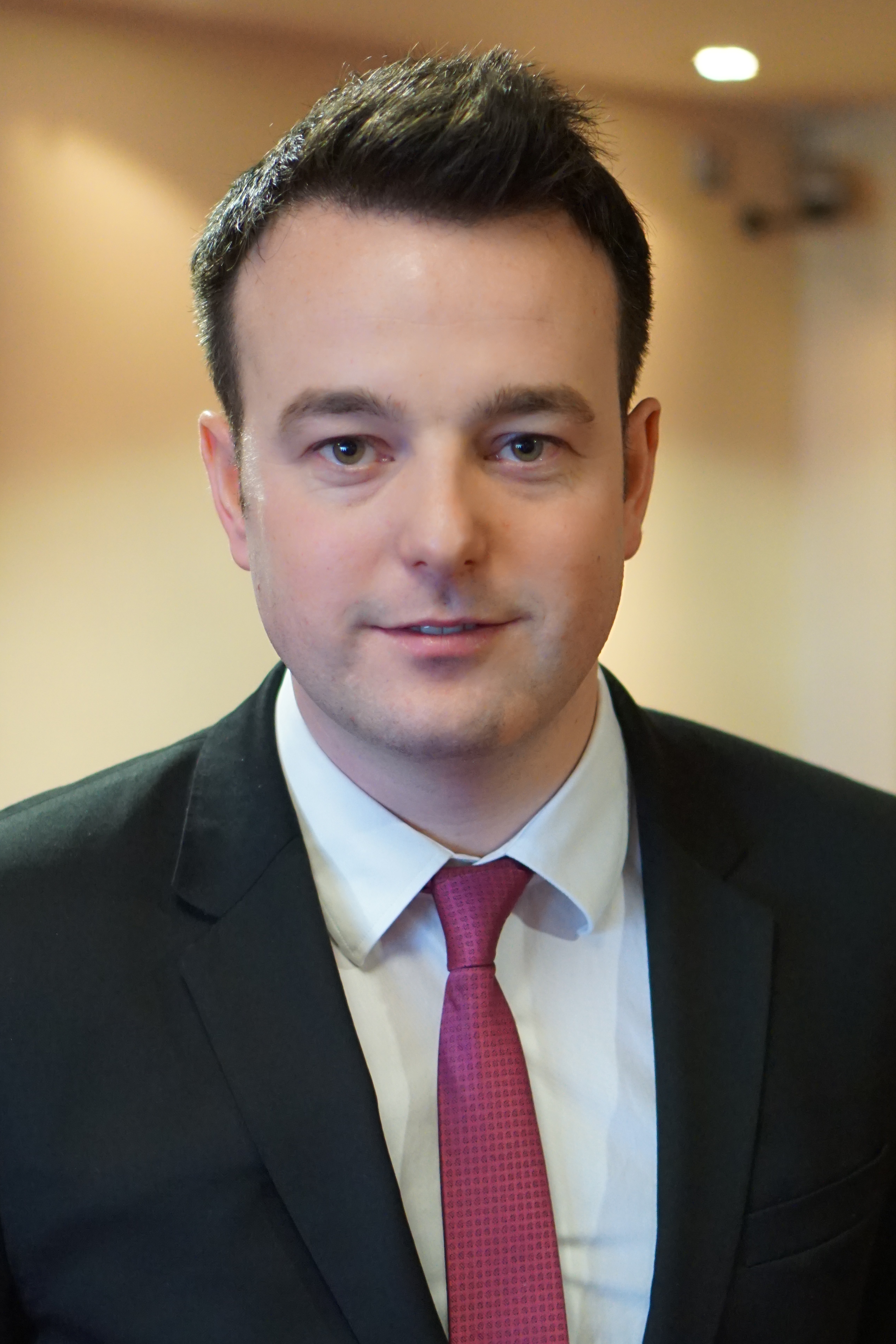

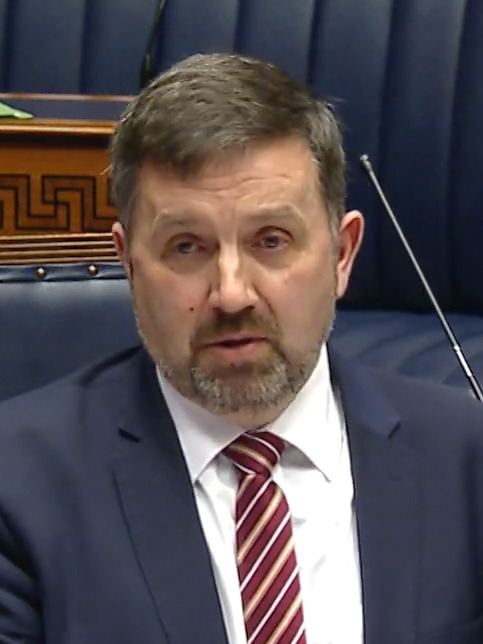

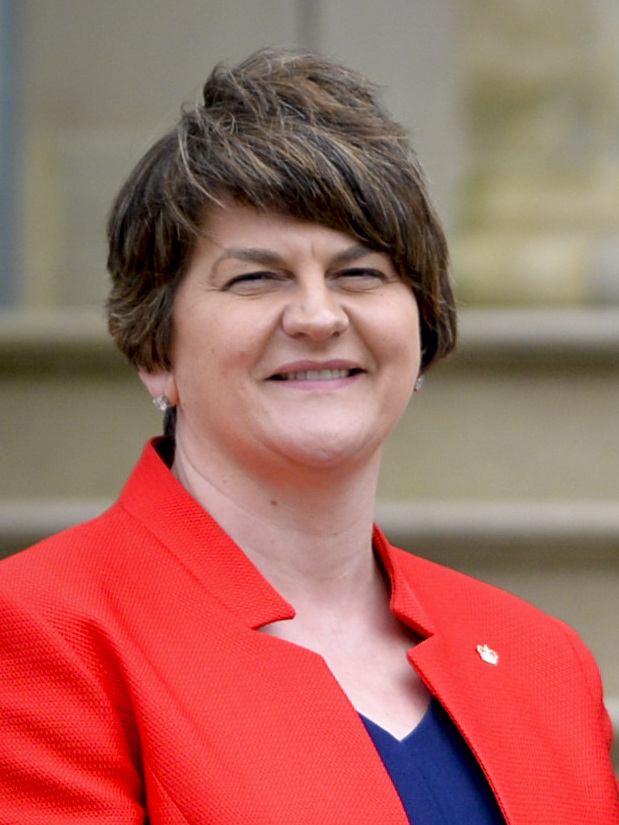

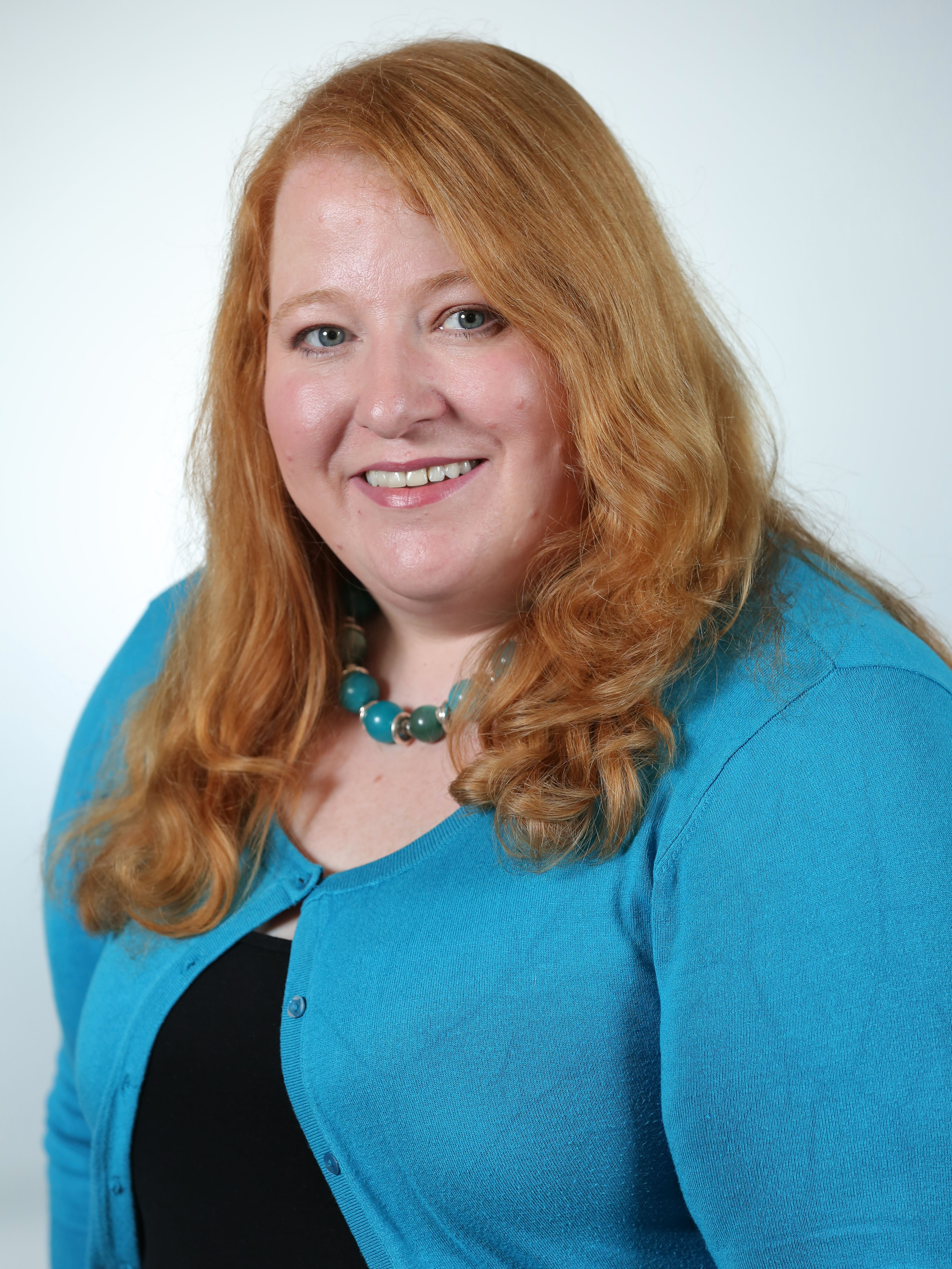
	First party	Second party	Third party
Leader	Michelle O'Neill (Note: The leader of Sinn Féin is Mary Lou McDonald, who sits as a TD in the Irish Dáil Éireann for Dublin Central. O'Neill is the leader of the party in Northern Ireland.)	Colum Eastwood
Party	Sinn Féin	SDLP	Independent
Seats before	14	14	3
Seats won	16	11	5
Seat change	▲2	▼3	▲2
Popular vote	25,327	15,975	8,661
Percentage	36.5%	26.8%	12.5%
Swing	▼0.6 pp	▼7.4 pp	▲7.5 pp
	Fourth party	Fifth party	Sixth party
Leader	Robin Swann	Arlene Foster	Naomi Long
Party	UUP	DUP	Alliance
Seats before	3	4	2
Seats won	4	3	2
Seat change	▲1	▼1	0
Popular vote	6,952	5,897	5,162
Percentage	10.0%	8.5%	7.4%
Swing	▼2.0 pp	▲0.9 pp	▲5.0 pp
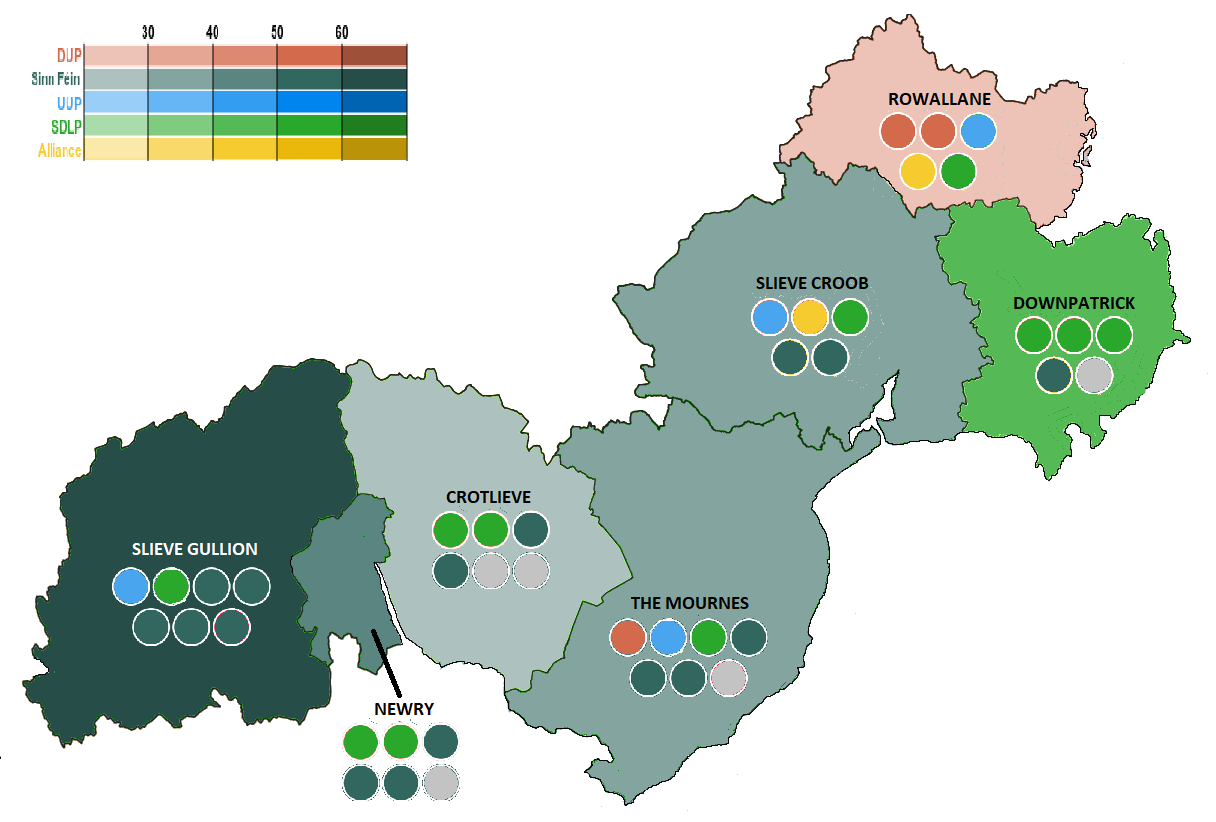
- Newry, Mourne and Down 2019 Council Election Results by DEA (Shaded by the plurality of FPVs)
Council control before election
No overall control
Council control after election
No overall control

The 2019 election to the Newry, Mourne and Down District Council, part of the Northern Ireland local elections that were held on 2 May 2019 returned 41 members to the council via Single Transferable Vote.

== Election results ==
Newry, Mourne and Down Borough Council Election Result 2019
Party	Seats	Gains	Losses	Net gain/loss	Seats %	Votes %	Votes	+/−
Sinn Féin	16	2	0	▲2	39.0	36.5	25,327	▼0.6
SDLP	11	0	3	▼3	26.8	23.0	15,975	▼7.4
Independent	5	2	0	▲2	12.2	12.5	8,661	▲7.5
UUP	4	1	0	▲1	9.8	10.0	6,952	▼2.0
DUP	3	0	1	▼1	7.3	8.5	5,897	▲0.9
Alliance	2	0	0	0	4.9	7.4	5,162	▲5.0
Aontú	0	0	0	0	0.0	1.5	1,055	New
Green (NI)	0	0	0	0	0.0	0.4	310	▲0.4
UKIP	0	0	1	▼1	0.0	0.0	0	▼3.9

Note: "Votes" are the first preference votes.

The overall turnout was 55.25% with a total of 69,339 valid votes cast. A total of 1,090 ballots were rejected.

== Districts summary ==
Results of the Newry, Mourne and Down District Council election, 2019 by district
Ward	%	Cllrs	%	Cllrs	%	Cllrs	%	Cllrs	%	Cllrs	%	Cllrs	Total Cllrs
Ward	Sinn Féin		SDLP		UUP		DUP		Alliance		Others		Total Cllrs
Crotlieve	29.8	2	27.0	2	6.2	0	3.2	0	4.2	0	29.5	2	6
Downpatrick	25.2	1	40.6	3	4.7	0	2.0	0	5.1	0	22.3	1	5
Newry	44.8	3	21.3	2	3.4	0	0.0	0	7.3	0	23.2	1	6
Rowallane	8.0	0	15.6	1	19.4	1	29.0	2	18.2	1	9.7	0	5
Slieve Croob	36.5	2	20.5	1	15.9	1	10.6	0	10.6	1	5.9	0	5
Slieve Gullion	62.7	5	21.6	1	10.3	1	2.5	0	2.9	0	0.0	0	7
The Mournes	34.2	3	18.0	1	12.0	1	16.1	1	7.8	0	12.0	1	7
Total	36.5	16	23.0	11	10.0	4	8.5	3	7.4	2	14.4	5	41

== District results ==
=== Crotlieve ===
2014: 3 × SDLP, 2 × Sinn Féin, 1 × Independent
2019: 2 × SDLP, 2 × Sinn Féin, 2 × Independent
2014-2019 Change: Independent gain from SDLP

Crotlieve - 6 seats
Party	Candidate	FPv%	Count								
Party	Candidate	FPv%	1	2	3	4	5	6	7	8	9
Independent	Jarlath Tinnelly*	12.30%	1,412	1,415	1,465	1,528	1,651				
Sinn Féin	Gerry O'Hare	11.20%	1,286	1,286	1,305	1,462	1,467	1,852			
SDLP	Declan McAteer*	10.24%	1,175	1,179	1,236	1,247	1,309	1,371	1,375.56	1,375.56	1,754.56
Independent	Mark Gibbons	10.36%	1,189	1,191	1,257	1,269	1,586	1,599	1,600.71	1,607.71	1,703.71
Sinn Féin	Mickey Ruane*	7.07%	812	812	822	963	1,039	1,396	1,590.94	1,593.64	1,687.64
SDLP	Karen McKevitt	9.72%	1,116	1,117	1,203	1,232	1,259	1,337	1,340.42	1,340.42	1,641.42
UUP	Joshua Lowry	6.20%	712	1,056	1,068	1,068	1,079	1,079	1,079	1,079	1,100.9
SDLP	Michael Carr	7.00%	808	810	877	880	1,055	1,073	1,075.85	1,075.85	
Sinn Féin	Oksana McMahon*	7.04%	809	809	823	922	940				
Independent	Jim Boylan	6.86%	788	789	853	856					
Sinn Féin	Mary Tinnelly	4.52%	519	519	524						
Alliance	Lorcán McGreevy	4.21%	483	484							
DUP	Wilma McCullough	3.23%	371								
Electorate: 19,863 Valid: 11,480 (57.80%) Spoilt: 169 Quota: 1,641 Turnout: 11,649 (58.65%)

=== Downpatrick ===
2014: 3 × SDLP, 1 × Sinn Féin, 1 × Independent
2019: 3 × SDLP, 1 × Sinn Féin, 1 × Independent
2014-2019 Change: No change

Downpatrick - 5 seats
Party	Candidate	FPv%	Count						
Party	Candidate	FPv%	1	2	3	4	5	6	7
SDLP	Gareth Sharvin*	19.01%	1,395						
Independent	Cadogan Enright* ‡	14.34%	1,052	1,093.36	1,216.46	1,327.46			
SDLP	Dermot Curran*	12.81%	940	969.59	976.59	1,059.02	1,222.24	1,317.24	
Sinn Féin	Oonagh Hanlon	14.06%	1,032	1,041.13	1,049.13	1,073.46	1,073.46	1,156.68	1,157.68
SDLP	John Trainor*	9.05%	664	744.74	758.18	852.83	906.27	1,060.81	1,094.81
Sinn Féin	Jordan Madden	11.35%	833	846.31	853.31	864.53	865.43	899.3	899.3
Aontú	Macartán Digney	6.47%	475	478.19	486.19	517.74	524.74		
UUP	Alex Burgess	4.70%	345	345.66	479.66	508.66			
Alliance	Tiernan Laird	5.11%	375	380.5	434.05				
DUP	James Savage	2.03%	149	149					
Green (NI)	Jamie Kennedy	1.74%	128	129.32					
Electorate: 14,620 Valid: 7,338 (50.19%) Spoilt: 86 Quota: 1,232 Turnout: 7,474 (51.12%)

=== Newry ===
2014: 3 × Sinn Féin, 2 × SDLP, 1 × Independent
2019: 3 × Sinn Féin, 2 × SDLP, 1 × Independent
2014-2019 Change: No change

Newry - 6 seats
Party	Candidate	FPv%	Count					
Party	Candidate	FPv%	1	2	3	4	5	6
Independent	Gavin Malone	23.19%	2,296					
Sinn Féin	Liz Kimmins* ††	13.88%	1,374	1,450.56				
SDLP	Michael Savage*	12.43%	1,231	1,417.56				
Sinn Féin	Charlie Casey* †	12.42%	1,230	1,345.28	1,347.16	1,843.16		
Sinn Féin	Valerie Harte*	10.56%	1,045	1,131.68	1,132.68	1,363.56	1,776.7	
SDLP	Gary Stokes*	8.87%	878	987.12	1,115.08	1,139.68	1,145.14	1,178.81
Alliance	Helena Young	7.28%	721	924.72	1,049.44	1,084.36	1,093.46	1,137.14
Sinn Féin	Sarah McAllister	7.92%	784	864.08	864.08			
UUP	Ricky McGaffin	3.44%	341	353.76				
Electorate: 19,400 Valid: 9,900 (51.03%) Spoilt: 198 Quota: 1,415 Turnout: 10,098 (52.05%)

=== Rowallane ===
2014: 2 x DUP, 1 x Alliance, 1 x SDLP, 1 x UUP
2019: 2 x DUP, 1 x Alliance, 1 x SDLP, 1 x UUP
2014-2019 Change: No change

Rowallane - 5 seats
Party	Candidate	FPv%	Count					
Party	Candidate	FPv%	1	2	3	4	5	6
Alliance	Patrick Brown* †	18.60%	1,416					
SDLP	Terry Andrews*	15.57%	1,211	1,322				
DUP	Harry Harvey* ††	16.27%	1,265	1,270	1,275.28	1,329.28		
UUP	Robert Burgess*	10.81%	842	865	892.83	1,075.37	1,082.96	1,142.81
DUP	William Walker* ‡††	12.67%	985	989	994.5	1,037.04	1,058.43	1,073.65
UUP	Walter Lyons	8.58%	667	682	692.89	746.95	751.78	772.54
Sinn Féin	Marianne Cleary	8.00%	622	652	671.47	709.67	709.67	
Independent	Martyn Todd	6.13%	477	525	570.54			
Green (NI)	Emma Cairns	2.34%	182					
Aontú	Liam Mulhern	1.27%	99					
Electorate: 14,896 Valid: 7,776 (52.20%) Spoilt: 73 Quota: 1,296 Turnout: 7,839 (52.62%)

=== Slieve Croob ===
2014: 2 × Sinn Féin, 1 × Alliance, 1 × SDLP, 1 × DUP
2019: 2 × Sinn Féin, 1 × Alliance, 1 × SDLP, 1 × UUP
2014-2019 Change: UUP gain from DUP

Slieve Croob - 5 seats
Party	Candidate	FPv%	Count					
Party	Candidate	FPv%	1	2	3	4	5	6
UUP	Alan Lewis ‡	15.93%	1,303	1,307	2,115			
Sinn Féin	Roisin Howell*	12.65%	1,035	1,086	1,088	1,090	1,611	
Sinn Féin	Cathy Mason †	13.07%	1,069	1,117	1,119	1,120	1,373	
Alliance	Gregory Bain †	10.55%	863	915	932	1,194	1,217	1,241.84
SDLP	Hugh Gallagher	10.76%	880	969	986	1,041	1,086	1,222.16
SDLP	Mark Murnin*	9.73%	796	894	907	1,017	1,071	1,154.72
Sinn Féin	John Rice*	10.81%	884	907	907	908		
DUP	Maynard Hanna	10.61%	868	889				
Aontú	Tracy Harkin	5.88%	481					
Electorate: 14,846 Valid: 8,179 (55.09%) Spoilt: 111 Quota: 1,364 Turnout: 8,290 (55.84%)

=== Slieve Gullion ===
2014: 4 × Sinn Féin, 2 × SDLP, 1 × UUP
2019: 5 × Sinn Féin, 1 × SDLP, 1 × UUP
2014-2019 Change: Sinn Féin gain from SDLP

Slieve Gullion - 7 seats
Party	Candidate	FPv%	Count			
Party	Candidate	FPv%	1	2	3	4
Sinn Féin	Terry Hearty* †	14.98%	1,876			
Sinn Féin	Mickey Larkin*	13.14%	1,646			
SDLP	Pete Byrne*	13.12%	1,643			
Sinn Féin	Oonagh Magennis	12.95%	1,622			
Sinn Féin	Barra Ó'Muirí*	10.79%	1,351	1,571.49		
UUP	David Taylor*	10.28%	1,287	1,287.34	1,577.34	
Sinn Féin	Roisin Mulgrew* †	10.88%	1,362	1,414.19	1,482.04	1,554.44
SDLP	Kate Loughran*	8.46%	1,059	1,076.85	1,291.89	1,296.34
Alliance	Gazdag Balázs	2.88%	361	365.08		
DUP	Linda Henry	2.52%	315	316.19		
Electorate: 20,858 Valid: 12,522 (60.03%) Spoilt: 295 Quota: 1,566 Turnout: 12,817 (61.45%)

=== The Mournes ===
2014: 2 × Sinn Féin, 2 × SDLP, 1 × DUP, 1 × UUP, 1 × UKIP
2019: 3 × Sinn Féin, 1 × SDLP, 1 × DUP, 1 × UUP, 1 × Independent
2014-2019 Change: Sinn Féin gain from SDLP, Independent leaves UKIP

The Mournes - 7 seats
Party	Candidate	FPv%	Count						
Party	Candidate	FPv%	1	2	3	4	5	6	7
DUP	Glyn Hanna* ‡‡	16.06%	1,944						
Sinn Féin	Sean Doran* †	15.57%	1,885						
SDLP	Laura Devlin*	12.99%	1,572						
UUP	Harold McKee ‡	12.02%	1,455	1,697					
Independent	Henry Reilly* ‡	11.95%	1,447	1,619.92					
Sinn Féin	Willie Clarke*	9.53%	1,154	1,154.44	1,283.64	1,283.86	1,426.54	1,426.98	1,445.42
Sinn Féin	Leeanne McEvoy	9.06%	1,097	1,098.32	1,269.92	1,269.92	1,372.32	1,372.54	1,379.86
Alliance	Andrew McMurray	7.79%	943	945.2	951	1,014.36	1,280.88	1,320.7	1,349.02
SDLP	Brian Quinn*	5.01%	607	612.06	675.26	735.32			
Electorate: 21,013 Valid: 12,104 (57.60%) Spoilt: 158 Quota: 1,514 Turnout: 12,262 (58.35%)

== Changes during the term ==
=== † Co-options ===
Date co-opted	Electoral Area	Party	Outgoing	Co-optee	Reason
3 October 2019	Slieve Croob	Alliance	Gregory Bain	Andrew McMurray	Bain resigned.
17 October 2019	Rowallane	DUP	Harry Harvey	Kathryn Owen	Harvey was co-opted to the Northern Ireland Assembly.
10 February 2020	Newry	Sinn Féin	Liz Kimmins	Roisin Mulgrew	Kimmins was co-opted to the Northern Ireland Assembly.
11 February 2020	Slieve Gullion	Sinn Féin	Roisin Mulgrew	Declan Murphy	Murphy filled the vacancy arising from Mulgrew's move from Slieve Gullion to Newry.
28 May 2020	Slieve Gullion	Sinn Féin	Terry Hearty	Aoife Finnegan	Hearty resigned.
23 December 2021	The Mournes	Sinn Féin	Sean Doran	Michael Rice	Doran died.
25 May 2022	Rowallane	Alliance	Patrick Brown	David Lee-Surginor	Brown was elected to the Northern Ireland Assembly.
9 June 2022	Slieve Croob	Sinn Féin	Cathy Mason	Jim Brennan	Mason was elected to the Northern Ireland Assembly.
24 October 2022	Rowallane	DUP	William Walker	Yvonne Moore	Walker resigned.
20 December 2022	Newry	Sinn Féin	Roisin Mulgrew	Geraldine Kearns	Mulgrew resigned.
20 December 2022	Newry	Sinn Féin	Charlie Casey	Cathal King	Casey resigned.
20 December 2022	Rowallane	DUP	Kathryn Owen	Jonathan Jackson	Owen resigned.
20 December 2022	Rowallane	DUP	Yvonne Moore	Callum Bowsie	Moore resigned.

=== ‡ Changes in affiliation ===
Date	Electoral Area	Name	Previous affiliation	New affiliation	Circumstance
6 June 2021	The Mournes	Glyn Hanna	DUP	Independent	Resigned from the DUP over disagreements with the new party leadership.
6 June 2021	Rowallane	Kathryn Owen	DUP	Independent	Resigned from the DUP over disagreements with the new party leadership.
14 September 2021	The Mournes	Glyn Hanna	Independent	DUP	Rejoined the DUP over resolving their disagreements with the new party leadership.
14 September 2021	Rowallane	Kathryn Owen	Independent	DUP	Rejoined the DUP over resolving their disagreements with the new party leadership.
29 October 2021	The Mournes	Harold McKee	UUP	Independent	Resigned from the UUP over disagreements with the new party leadership on social issues.
13 November 2021	The Mournes	Harold McKee	Independent	TUV	Joined the TUV having recently resigned from the UUP.
28 February 2022	Rowallane	William Walker	DUP	Independent	Suspended by the DUP after being arrested.
25 July 2022	Downpatrick	Cadogan Enright	Independent	Alliance	Joined Alliance.
12 August 2022	Slieve Croob	Alan Lewis	UUP	DUP	Defected to the DUP.
12 August 2022	The Mournes	Henry Reilly	Independent	DUP	Joined the DUP.

=== – Suspensions ===
None

Last updated 26 October 2022.

Current composition: see Newry, Mourne and Down District Council
