= 2011 Newry and Mourne District Council election =

Local govt election in Northern Ireland

← 2005	5 May 2011	2014 →

All 30 seats to Newry and Mourne District Council 16 seats needed for a majority
	First party	Second party	Third party
Party	Sinn Féin	SDLP	UUP
Seats won	14	9	3
Seat change	▲1	0	0
	Fourth party	Fifth party	Sixth party
Party	Independent	DUP	UKIP
Seats won	2	1	1
Seat change	0	▼1	▲1
	Seventh party
Party	Green (NI)
Seats won	0
Seat change	▼1
- Party with the most votes by district.

Elections to Newry and Mourne District Council were held on 5 May 2011 on the same day as the other Northern Irish local government elections. The election used five district electoral areas to elect a total of 30 councillors.

== Election results ==
Newry and Mourne District Council Election Result 2011
Party	Seats	Gains	Losses	Net gain/loss	Seats %	Votes %	Votes	+/−
Sinn Féin	14	1	0	▲1	46.7	45.2	17,877	▲3.1
SDLP	9	1	1	0	30.0	28.9	11,443	▼0.6
UUP	3	1	1	0	10.0	10.3	4,078	▼0.5
Independent	2	1	1	0	6.7	5.7	2,262	▼3.2
UKIP	1	1	0	▲1	3.3	4.8	1,910	New
DUP	1	0	1	▼1	3.3	3.0	1,172	▼3.7
TUV	0	0	0	0	0.0	1.0	408	New
Green (NI)	0	0	1	▼1	0.0	1.0	382	▼1.0

Note: "Votes" are the first preference votes.

== Districts summary ==
Results of the Newry and Mourne District Council election, 2011 by district
Ward	%	Cllrs	%	Cllrs	%	Cllrs	%	Cllrs	%	Cllrs	%	Cllrs	Total Cllrs
Ward	Sinn Féin		SDLP		UUP		UKIP		DUP		Others		Total Cllrs
Crotlieve	38.1	3	46.1	4	7.6	0	0.0	0	0.0	0	8.2	0	7
Newry Town	43.8	3	27.2	2	5.6	0	0.0	0	0.0	0	23.4	2	7
Slieve Gullion	78.0	4	22.0	1	0.0	0	0.0	0	0.0	0	0.0	0	5
The Fews	46.2	2	23.3	1	23.9	2	0.0	0	4.3	0	2.3	0	6
The Mournes	19.5	1	20.7	1	15.6	1	27.7	1	12.2	1	4.3	0	5
Total	45.2	14	28.9	9	10.3	3	4.8	1	3.0	1	7.8	2	30

== District results ==
=== Crotlieve ===
2005: 3 x SDLP, 2 x Sinn Féin, 1 x Green, 1 x Independent
2011: 4 x SDLP, 3 x Sinn Féin
2005-2011 Change: SDLP and Sinn Féin gain from Green and Independent

Crotlieve - 7 seats
Party	Candidate	FPv%	Count				
Party	Candidate	FPv%	1	2	3	4	5
Sinn Féin	Michael Ruane*	16.90%	1,640				
SDLP	Declan McAteer	15.12%	1,467				
SDLP	Michael Carr*	13.42%	1,302				
Sinn Féin	Mick Murphy*	12.99%	1,261				
SDLP	Sean O'Hare	12.48%	1,211	1,251.6			
Sinn Féin	Peter Kearney	8.24%	800	1,118.36	1,158.56	1,198.24	1,283.24
SDLP	Connaire McGreevey	5.05%	490	517.16	696.36	817.88	1,031.56
UUP	William Mitchell	7.55%	733	733.84	736.84	765.04	787.64
Independent	Jarlath Tinnelly	5.09%	494	517.24	530.84	584.36	
Green (NI)	Bonnie Anley	3.16%	307	317.08	330.08		
Electorate: 17,357 Valid: 9,705 (55.91%) Spoilt: 154 Quota: 1,214 Turnout: 9,859 (56.80%)

=== Newry Town ===
2005: 3 x Sinn Féin, 3 x SDLP, 1 x Independent
2011: 3 x Sinn Féin, 2 x SDLP, 2 x Independent
2005-2011 Change: Independent gain from SDLP

Newry Town - 7 seats
Party	Candidate	FPv%	Count					
Party	Candidate	FPv%	1	2	3	4	5	6
Sinn Féin	Charlie Casey*	16.89%	1,280					
Independent	Davy Hyland	13.29%	1,007					
SDLP	John McArdle*	10.94%	829	846.28	949.28			
Independent	Jack Patterson*	9.91%	751	763.96	778.31	969.31		
Sinn Féin	Valerie Harte	11.76%	891	930.69	935.5	937.5	947.58	986.58
SDLP	Frank Feely*	5.29%	401	411.8	562.23	619.23	624.72	968.72
Sinn Féin	Brendan Curran*	8.34%	632	722.72	740.12	743.39	756.8	822.04
Sinn Féin	Marian O'Reilly*	6.84%	518	654.08	660.16	662.16	673.14	687.49
SDLP	Gary Stokes*	6.84%	518	523.4	542.67	585.67	601.15	
UUP	Colin McElroy	5.60%	424	425.35	426.35			
SDLP	Joe Coyle	4.18%	317	330.23				
Independent	James Malone	0.13%	10	10.81				
Electorate: 13,721 Valid: 7,578 (55.23%) Spoilt: 153 Quota: 948 Turnout: 7,731 (56.34%)

=== Slieve Gullion ===
2005: 4 x Sinn Féin, 1 x SDLP
2011: 4 x Sinn Féin, 1 x SDLP
2005-2011 Change: No change

Slieve Gullion - 5 seats
Party	Candidate	FPv%	Count	
Party	Candidate	FPv%	1	2
SDLP	Geraldine Donnelly*	22.05%	1,681	
Sinn Féin	Terry Hearty*	17.31%	1,320	
Sinn Féin	Colman Burns*	17.21%	1,312	
Sinn Féin	Anthony Flynn*	15.28%	1,165	1,327.87
Sinn Féin	Patrick McDonald*	15.29%	1,166	1,295.93
Sinn Féin	Padra McNamee	12.85%	980	1,094.07
Electorate: 11,983 Valid: 7,624 (63.62%) Spoilt: 150 Quota: 1,271 Turnout: 7,774 (64.88%)

=== The Fews ===
2005: 3 x Sinn Féin, 1 x UUP, 1 x SDLP, 1 x DUP
2011: 3 x Sinn Féin, 2 x UUP, 1 x SDLP
2005-2011 Change: UUP gain from DUP

The Fews - 6 seats
Party	Candidate	FPv%	Count					
Party	Candidate	FPv%	1	2	3	4	5	6
UUP	Andy Moffett*	18.41%	1,421					
Sinn Féin	Turlough Murphy	16.83%	1,299					
Sinn Féin	Patrick McGinn*	15.60%	1,204					
SDLP	John Feehan*	15.43%	1,191					
Sinn Féin	Jimmy McCreesh*	13.80%	1,065	1,066.15	1,242.95			
UUP	David Taylor	5.51%	425	667.42	667.58	667.74	668.49	1,146.39
SDLP	Kevin O'Hare	7.85%	606	611.75	621.99	654.47	749.47	759.79
DUP	Glenn Oliver*	4.29%	331	368.49	369.13	369.61	370.61	
TUV	Barrie Halliday	2.31%	178	203.3	203.62	204.1	204.85	
Electorate: 12,613 Valid: 7,720 (61.21%) Spoilt: 167 Quota: 1,103 Turnout: 7,887 (62.53%)

=== The Mournes ===
2005: 2 x UUP, 1 x DUP, 1 x SDLP, 1 x Sinn Féin
2011: 1 x UKIP, x UUP, 1 x DUP, 1 x SDLP, 1 x Sinn Féin
2005-2011 Change: UKIP gain from UUP

The Mournes - 5 seats
Party	Candidate	FPv%	Count					
Party	Candidate	FPv%	1	2	3	4	5	6
UKIP	Henry Reilly*	27.66%	1,910					
Sinn Féin	Sean Doran	19.46%	1,344					
SDLP	Seán Rogers	14.34%	990	999.6	1,110.94	1,133.43	1,533.43	
DUP	William Burns*	11.35%	784	972.4	973.16	1,124.96	1,136.17	1,151.17
UUP	Harold McKee*	8.47%	585	846.2	846.2	966	975.48	992.48
UUP	David McCauley	7.10%	490	641.2	642.34	724.33	731.68	768.68
SDLP	Theresa McLaverty	6.37%	440	445.6	513.62	544.98		
TUV	Arthur Coulter	3.33%	230	323.6	323.98			
DUP	Michelle Burns	0.83%	57	89.4	90.35			
Green (NI)	Heather McDermott	1.09%	75	79.4	88.52			
Electorate: 11,005 Valid: 6,905 (62.74%) Spoilt: 99 Quota: 1,151 Turnout: 7,004 (63.64%)
