= Jill Macauley =

Northern Irish unionist politician

Chairwoman of the Ulster Unionist Party
- In office 22 May 2022 – March 2025
- Leader: Doug Beattie; Mike Nesbitt
- Preceded by: Danny Kennedy
- Succeeded by: Lord Elliott of Ballinamallard

Member of Armagh City, Banbridge and Craigavon Borough Council
- In office 2 May 2019 – 18 May 2023
- Preceded by: Elizabeth Ingram
- Succeeded by: Chris McCartan
- Constituency: Banbridge

Member of Newry, Mourne and Down District Council
- In office 1 June 2016 – 2 May 2019
- Preceded by: Harold McKee
- Succeeded by: Harold McKee
- Constituency: The Mournes

Personal details
- Born: County Down, Northern Ireland
- Political party: Ulster Unionist Party

Jill Macauley is a Northern Irish unionist politician, businesswoman and farmer who was chairwoman of the Ulster Unionist Party (UUP) from 2022 to 2025. She previously served as an Armagh City, Banbridge and Craigavon Borough councillor for the Banbridge DEA from 2019 until 2023.

== Background ==
Macauley was the unsuccessful running mate to the Ulster Unionist Party's Harold McKee at the 2014 Newry, Mourne and Down Council election. She was later co-opted onto the council for The Mournes District in June 2016, following McKee's election to the Northern Ireland Assembly.

At the 2019 local elections, she was elected onto Armagh City, Banbridge and Craigavon Borough Council, on the sixth count, for the Banbridge District.

She subsequently contested South Down at the December 2019 general election, where she increased the Ulster Unionist Party's vote share by 2.7% to 3,307 votes (6.6%), coming fifth.

Macauley was the UUP candidate for South Down at the 2022 Assembly election. She polled 2,880 votes (5.2%), and was eliminated on the fourth count.

=== Chairwoman of the Ulster Unionist Party ===
On 23 May 2022, Macauley was appointed chairwoman of the Ulster Unionist Party, succeeding Danny Kennedy. Outlining her ambitions, she said: "My focus will be on growth, attracting new party members and females in particular. We need to select and elect more female representatives to reflect the modern Northern Ireland. We are not where we want to be, but with a bit more focus and work we can get there."

She was defeated at the 2023 local elections, which saw the total number of UUP representatives in the Armagh, Banbridge and Craigavon Authority fall from to 10 to 6.
