= 2005 Newry and Mourne District Council election =

Local govt election in Northern Ireland

← 2001	5 May 2005	2011 →

All 30 seats to Newry and Mourne District Council 16 seats needed for a majority
	First party	Second party	Third party
Party	Sinn Féin	SDLP	UUP
Seats won	13	9	3
Seat change	0	▼1	▼1
	Fourth party	Fifth party	Sixth party
Party	DUP	Independent	Green (NI)
Seats won	2	2	1
Seat change	▲1	0	▲1
- Party with the most votes by district.

Elections to Newry and Mourne District Council were held on 5 May 2005 on the same day as the other Northern Irish local government elections. The election used five district electoral areas to elect a total of 30 councillors.

== Election results ==
Newry and Mourne District Council Election Result 2005
Party	Seats	Gains	Losses	Net gain/loss	Seats %	Votes %	Votes	+/−
Sinn Féin	13	0	0	0	43.3	42.1	17,999	▲2.9
SDLP	9	0	1	▼1	30.0	29.5	12,615	▼6.0
UUP	3	0	1	▼1	10.0	10.8	4,612	▼1.8
Independent	2	0	0	0	6.7	8.9	3,796	▲2.6
DUP	2	1	0	▲1	6.7	6.7	2,849	▲0.3
Green (NI)	1	1	0	▲1	3.3	2.0	863	▲2.0

Note: "Votes" are the first preference votes.

== Districts summary ==
Results of the Newry and Mourne District Council election, 2005 by district
Ward	%	Cllrs	%	Cllrs	%	Cllrs	%	Cllrs	%	Cllrs	%	Cllrs	Total Cllrs
Ward	Sinn Féin		SDLP		UUP		DUP		Green		Others		Total Cllrs
Crotlieve	31.2	2	39.4	3	4.8	0	2.8	0	8.1	1	13.7	1	7
Newry Town	46.5	3	30.5	3	6.4	0	0.0	0	0.0	0	16.6	1	7
Slieve Gullion	76.1	4	23.9	1	0.0	0	0.0	0	0.0	0	0.0	0	5
The Fews	43.4	3	26.9	1	21.5	1	8.3	1	0.0	0	0.0	0	6
The Mournes	12.2	1	23.2	1	25.2	2	26.4	1	0.0	0	13.0	0	5
Total	42.1	13	29.5	9	10.8	3	6.7	2	2.0	1	8.9	2	30

== District results ==
=== Crotlieve ===
2001: 4 x SDLP, 2 x Sinn Féin, 1 x Independent
2005: 3 x SDLP, 2 x Sinn Féin, 1 x Green, 1 x Independent
2001-2005 Change: Green gain from SDLP

Crotlieve - 7 seats
Party	Candidate	FPv%	Count							
Party	Candidate	FPv%	1	2	3	4	5	6	7	8
SDLP	Michael Carr*	9.79%	1,041	1,045	1,056	1,344				
SDLP	Karen McKevitt	10.82%	1,150	1,151	1,157	1,277	1,398			
SDLP	Josephine O'Hare*	9.09%	966	968	975	998	1,113	1,168.44	1,305.44	1,437.44
Sinn Féin	Michael Ruane*	10.08%	1,071	1,071	1,097	1,110	1,136	1,136	1,137	1,331
Sinn Féin	Mick Murphy*	8.02%	852	852	1,151	1,159	1,203	1,204.32	1,206.32	1,265.32
Green (NI)	Ciaran Mussen	8.12%	863	866	878	886	925	928.52	1,076.52	1,231.52
Independent	Anthony Williamson*	6.65%	707	711	745	751	889	892.08	1,003.08	1,140.96
Sinn Féin	Peter Kearney	8.66%	921	921	959	964	981	983.64	987.08	1,012.08
Independent	Thomas McCann	7.01%	745	749	754	778	808	809.32	869.32	
UUP	Kenneth Donaldson	4.80%	510	767	767	770	774	774.44		
SDLP	Brendan Murney	4.98%	529	531	564	608				
SDLP	Paul McKibben	4.68%	498	498	499					
Sinn Féin	Geraldine McAteer	4.49%	477	477						
DUP	Wilma McCullough	2.82%	300							
Electorate: 15,832 Valid: 10,630 (67.14%) Spoilt: 198 Quota: 1,329 Turnout: 10,828 (68.39%)

=== Newry Town ===
2001: 3 x Sinn Féin, 3 x SDLP, 1 x Independent
2005: 3 x Sinn Féin, 3 x SDLP, 1 x Independent
2001-2005 Change: No change

Newry Town - 7 seats
Party	Candidate	FPv%	Count							
Party	Candidate	FPv%	1	2	3	4	5	6	7	8
Independent	Jack Patterson*	13.86%	1,186							
Sinn Féin	Charlie Casey*	13.19%	1,128							
SDLP	John McArdle*	10.51%	899	931	955	957.85	1,054.05	1,127.05		
Sinn Féin	Brendan Curran*	8.45%	723	742	756.5	772.6	786.6	788.8	1,116.8	
SDLP	Gary Stokes	6.52%	558	578	595.1	595.85	911.55	993.25	1,029.8	1,036.8
Sinn Féin	Marian Mathers	9.71%	831	847	853.7	878.3	897.55	898.55	984.45	984.45
SDLP	Frank Feely*	7.66%	655	678	692.1	694.1	753.05	869.05	887.85	926.85
Sinn Féin	Ewan Morgan	8.32%	712	732	738.1	741.55	748.75	750.75	875.25	875.25
Sinn Féin	Catherine McMahon	6.79%	581	595	602.2	605.4	614	618		
UUP	David Taylor	6.43%	550	551	553.5	553.55	554.65			
SDLP	Terry Ruddy	5.78%	494	526	543.7	546.1				
Independent	Gerry Markey	2.22%	190							
Independent	Vincent Markey	0.55%	47							
Electorate: 12,827 Valid: 8,554 (66.69%) Spoilt: 202 Quota: 1,070 Turnout: 8,756 (68.26%)

=== Slieve Gullion ===
2001: 4 x Sinn Féin, 1 x SDLP
2005: 4 x Sinn Féin, 1 x SDLP
2001-2005 Change: No change

Slieve Gullion - 5 seats
Party	Candidate	FPv%	Count		
Party	Candidate	FPv%	1	2	3
Sinn Féin	Colman Burns*	16.98%	1,399		
SDLP	Geraldine Donnelly	13.97%	1,151	1,827	
Sinn Féin	Patrick McDonald*	13.41%	1,105	1,185	1,323
Sinn Féin	Terry Hearty*	15.72%	1,295	1,304	1,318
Sinn Féin	Anthony Flynn	15.09%	1,243	1,263	1,312
Sinn Féin	Mary Campbell	14.85%	1,223	1,230	1,262
SDLP	Peter McEvoy	9.98%	822		
Electorate: 10,836 Valid: 8,238 (76.02%) Spoilt: 167 Quota: 1,374 Turnout: 8,405 (77.57%)

=== The Fews ===
2001: 3 x Sinn Féin, 2 x UUP, 1 x SDLP
2005: 3 x Sinn Féin, 1 x UUP, 1 x SDLP, 1 x DUP
2001-2005 Change: DUP gain from UUP

The Fews - 6 seats
Party	Candidate	FPv%	Count			
Party	Candidate	FPv%	1	2	3	4
Sinn Féin	Patrick McGinn*	15.15%	1,246			
Sinn Féin	Jimmy McCreesh*	14.47%	1,190			
Sinn Féin	Brendan Lewis*	13.80%	1,135	1,184.7		
SDLP	John Feehan*	11.63%	957	963.2	1,218.2	
UUP	Danny Kennedy*	14.21%	1,169	1,169.75	1,179.75	
DUP	Glenn Oliver	8.28%	681	681	681	1,064.05
SDLP	Susan Mackin	8.73%	718	720.25	918.95	992.25
UUP	Andy Moffett*	7.25%	596	596.6	601.65	
SDLP	Noelle McGarvey	6.49%	534	535.7		
Electorate: 11,551 Valid: 8,226 (71.21%) Spoilt: 168 Quota: 1,176 Turnout: 8,394 (72.67%)

=== The Mournes ===
2001: 2 x UUP, 1 x DUP, 1 x SDLP, 1 x Sinn Féin
2005: 2 x UUP, 1 x DUP, 1 x SDLP, 1 x Sinn Féin
2001-2005 Change: No change

The Mournes - 5 seats
Party	Candidate	FPv%	Count					
Party	Candidate	FPv%	1	2	3	4	5	6
DUP	William Burns*	25.30%	1,793					
UUP	Henry Reilly*	17.47%	1,238					
UUP	Isaac Hanna*	7.75%	549	636.72	859.5	865.5	1,337.36	
SDLP	Michael Cole*	13.41%	950	952.04	955.72	1,095.72	1,105.48	1,129.62
Sinn Féin	Martin Connolly	12.24%	867	867.34	867.34	1,029.34	1,030.34	1,032.04
SDLP	Marian Fitzpatrick	9.78%	693	693.34	695.68	679.68	886.46	928.62
DUP	Linda Burns	1.06%	75	524.14	688.48	688.48		
Independent	Martin Cunningham*	7.89%	559	559	559.34			
Independent	Arthur Coulter	5.11%	362	427.62				
Electorate: 10,207 Valid: 7,086 (69.42%) Spoilt: 139 Quota: 1,182 Turnout: 7,225 (70.78%)
