= Aoife Finnegan =

Irish politician

Aoife Finnegan MLA
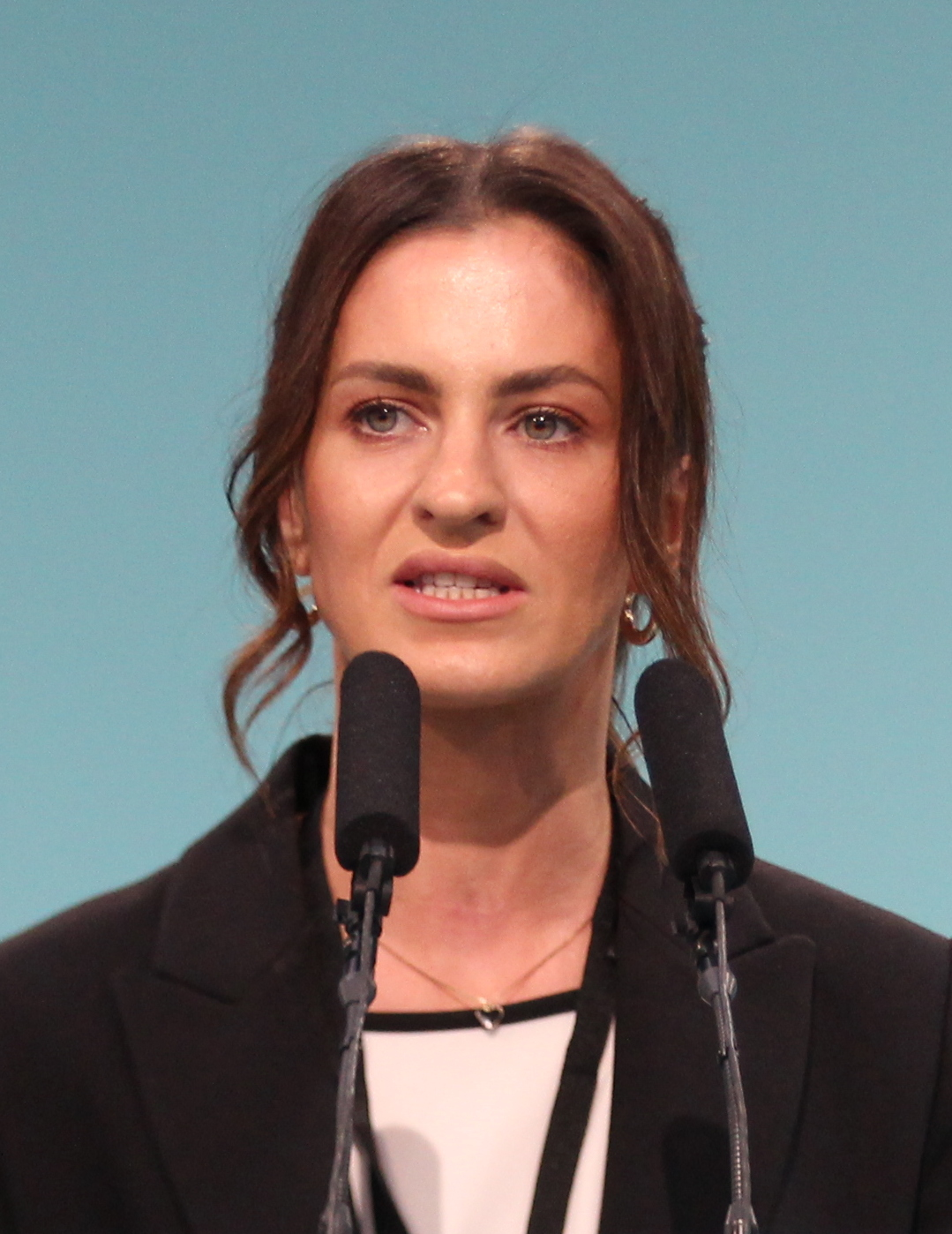
- Finnegan in 2024

Member of the Northern Ireland Assembly for Newry and Armagh
- Incumbent
- Assumed office 9 February 2025
- Preceded by: Conor Murphy

Member of Newry, Mourne and Down District Council
- In office 28 May 2020 – 9 February 2025
- Preceded by: Terry Hearty
- Constituency: Slieve Gullion

Personal details
- Born: 20 June 1988 (age 37) Crossmaglen, County Armagh, Northern Ireland
- Party: Sinn Féin
- Occupation: Politician

Aoife Finnegan is an Irish Sinn Féin politician, who has served as a Member of the Legislative Assembly (MLA) for Newry and Armagh since February 2025.

She previously served as a councillor for the Slieve Gullion DEA on Newry, Mourne and Down District Council from 2020 to 2025.

== Career ==
Finnegan has been a Sinn Féin activist since she was a teenager, and worked in Conor Murphy MLA’s constituency office for many years.

In May 2020, Finnegan was co-opted onto Newry, Mourne and Down District Council to replace Terry Hearty as a Slieve Gullion councillor. She was re-elected in 2023 with the highest number of first preference votes in the Slieve Gullion DEA.

In February 2025, Finnegan replaced Conor Murphy as a Member of the Legislative Assembly (MLA) for Newry and Armagh, after he was elected to the Seanad Éireann. She was unanimously endorsed by Sinn Féin members at a convention on 8 February.

== Personal life ==
Finnegan is a Crossmaglen native, and she currently lives there.
