= Andrew McMurray =

Alliance Party of Northern Ireland MLA

Andrew McMurray MLA
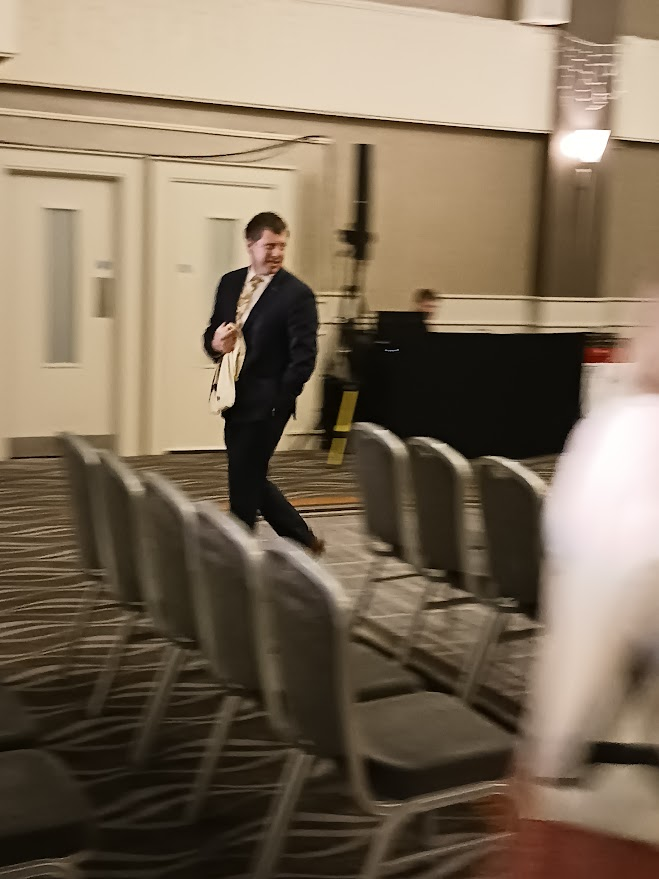

Member of the Northern Ireland Assembly for South Down
- Incumbent
- Assumed office 30 April 2024
- Preceded by: Patrick Brown

Member of Newry, Mourne and Down Council
- In office 8 October 2019 – 30 April 2024
- Preceded by: Gregory Bain
- Succeeded by: Helena Young
- Constituency: Slieve Croob
- In office 16 November 2016 – 2 May 2019
- Preceded by: Patrick Clarke
- Constituency: Slieve Croob

Personal details
- Born: County Down, Northern Ireland
- Party: Alliance

Andrew McMurray is an Alliance Party politician, serving as a Member of the Legislative Assembly (MLA) for South Down since April 2024.

== Background ==
=== Political career ===
McMurray was co-opted onto to Newry, Mourne and Down District Council in November 2016, succeeding Patrick Clarke as Alliance councillor in the Slieve Croob District.

McMurray ran in South Down at the 2017 general election, coming last, with 1,814 votes (3.6%).

At the 2019 local elections, he moved to The Mournes District, though was unsuccessful.

McMurray returned to the Council in October 2019, following Gregory Bain's resignation. He retained his seat at the 2023 Council election, being elected on the fourth count.

In April 2024, he replaced Patrick Brown in the Northern Ireland Assembly as member for South Down.

McMurray contested South Down at the 2024 general election, coming fourth with 3,187 votes (7.0%).
