= Harold McKee =

Northern Irish politician (born 1957)

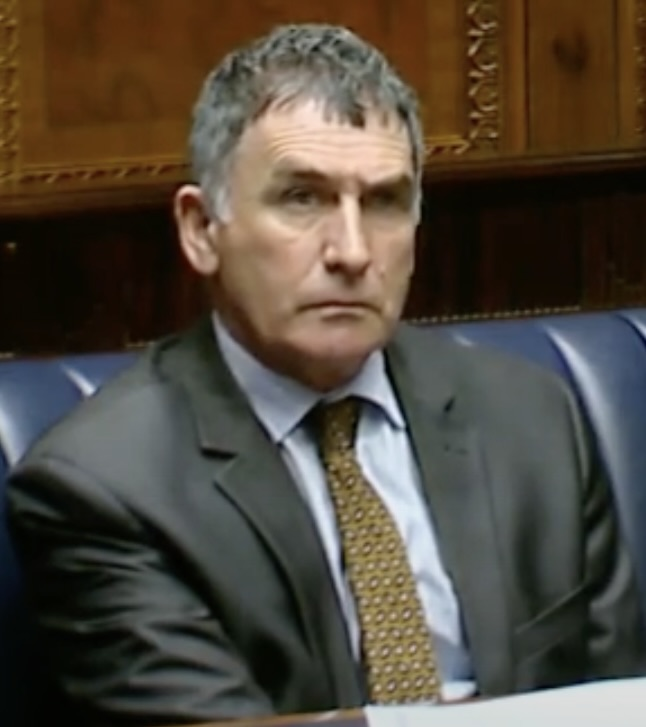
- McKee in 2017

Member of Newry, Mourne and Down District Council
- In office 2 May 2019 – 18 May 2023
- Preceded by: Jill Macauley
- Succeeded by: Jill Truesdale
- Constituency: The Mournes
- In office 22 May 2014 – 5 May 2016
- Preceded by: New council
- Succeeded by: Jill MacCauley

Member of the Legislative Assembly for South Down
- In office 5 May 2016 – 26 January 2017
- Preceded by: John McCallister
- Succeeded by: Seat abolished

Member of Newry and Mourne District Council
- In office 5 May 2011 – 22 May 2014
- Preceded by: Isaac Hanna
- Succeeded by: Council abolished
- Constituency: The Mournes

Personal details
- Born: 28 December 1957 (age 68) Kilkeel, Northern Ireland
- Party: TUV (2021 - present)
- Other political affiliations: Ulster Unionist Party (until 2021)

Harold McKee (born 28 December 1957) is a Northern Irish unionist politician who was a Newry Mourne and Down Councillor for The Mournes DEA from 2014 to 2016, and then again from 2019 until 2023.

McKee was previously a Member of the Legislative Assembly (MLA) for South Down from 2016 to 2017.

== Background ==
=== Political career ===
McKee was first elected onto Newry and Mourne District Council at the 2011 local elections, representing The Mournes District, for the Ulster Unionist Party (UUP). He was re-elected at the 2014 local elections, this time onto the successor Newry, Mourne and Down District Council.

McKee stood in South Down at the 2015 general election, finishing third with 3,964 votes (9.3%).

At the 2016 Northern Ireland Assembly election, he was elected to represent South Down, taking the constituency's second seat. During his time in the Assembly, McKee was the Ulster Unionist Party's agriculture spokesperson. McKee warned against the collapsing of the Northern Ireland Executive in January 2017, expressing concern that the agri-food sector would be damaged in any such event. He was defeated at the 2017 Assembly election, when the number of seats were reduced from six to five.

At the June 2017 general election, he came fourth in South Down, polling 2,002 votes (3.9%).

McKee made a comeback to Newry, Mourne and Down at the 2019 local elections, being the sixth candidate returned in The Mournes. He became deputy chair of the council in June 2020, commenting on his new role that: “My position as Deputy Chairperson will look very different compared to previous years due to the current situation, however I am willing to embrace the challenge and look forward to working with all Elected Members across the district.”.

==== Resignation from the Ulster Unionist Party ====
In October 2021, McKee resigned from the UUP, citing disagreements over the 'liberal' direction the party was heading in, under Doug Beattie's leadership. He said it was "becoming very difficult to endorse a leader who is constantly to the fore promoting liberal issues". Additionally, Beattie had previously advised members to "leave your religion at the door", something which McKee, a Christian, strongly disagreed with. Commenting on McKee's resignation, a party spokesman said: “We would like to thank Harold for his service and wish him well for the future. The party will continue to hold out the hand of friendship as Harold takes a new path.” He stated his intention to remain on the council as an independent, "at this point in time".

The following month, he joined the Traditional Unionist Voice (TUV), saying: “Following discussions with TUV leader, Jim Allister, where I set out the importance of my Christian values as a politician, I have taken up an offer of another party much earlier than I had intended, but prayerfully and with the support of many other people’s prayers. Like many people across Northern Ireland I appreciate the strong and principled leadership Jim has offered, particularly in recent days when it has come to the Northern Ireland Protocol which is undermining our position in the U.K."

He was announced as TUV's candidate for South Down in December 2021, ahead of the 2022 Assembly election. Former Democratic Unionist Party (DUP) MLA Jim Wells, who had been de-selected in favour of Diane Forsythe, quit the party and instead endorsed McKee's candidacy. Subsequently, all of the DUP's Officers in the South Down Association resigned their membership in order to support McKee. In the election, he polled 3,273 first-preference votes (6.0%), and was the sixth candidate to be eliminated.

He lost his seat to Alliance's Jill Truesdale at the 2023 local elections, being eliminated on the eighth count with 880 first-preferences (6.6%).

Northern Ireland Assembly
Preceded by John McCallister	MLA for Down South; 2016–2017	Seat abolished
