= The Mournes (District Electoral Area) =

District electoral area in Northern Ireland

- Newry, Mourne and Down District Council DEA constituency

Current constituency
- Created: 1985
- Seats: 5 (1985-2014); 7 (2014-)
- Councillors: Willie Clarke (SF); Laura Devlin (SDLP); Glyn Hanna (DUP); Niall Lawlor (SF); Henry Reilly (DUP); Michael Rice (SF); Jill Truesdale (APNI)

The Mournes DEA within Newry, Mourne and Down

The Mournes DEA (1993-2014) within Newry and Mourne

The Mournes is one of the seven district electoral areas (DEA) in Newry, Mourne and Down, Northern Ireland. The district elects seven members to Newry, Mourne and Down District Council and contains the wards of Annalong, Binnian, Donard, Kilkeel, Lisnacree, Murlough and Tollymore. The Mournes forms part of the South Down constituencies for the Northern Ireland Assembly and UK Parliament.

It was created for the 1985 local elections, replacing Newry and Mourne Area A which had existed since 1973, where it originally contained five wards (Annalong, Binnian, Kilkeel Central, Kilkeel South and Lisnacree). For the 2014 local elections it gained two additional wards, gaining Donard, Murlough and Tollymore from the abolished Newcastle DEA, while Kilkeel was merged into a single ward.

== Councillors ==
Election	Councillor (Party)	Councillor (Party)	Councillor (Party)	Councillor (Party)	Councillor (Party)	Councillor (Party)	Councillor (Party)
2023	Henry Reilly (DUP)/ (Independent)/ (TUV)/ (UKIP)/ (UUP)	Glyn Hanna (DUP)/ (Independent)	Jill Truesdale (Alliance)	Laura Devlin (SDLP)	Michael Rice (Sinn Féin)	Leeanne McEvoy (Sinn Féin)	Willie Clarke (Sinn Féin)
December 2021 Co-Option	Henry Reilly (DUP)/ (Independent)/ (TUV)/ (UKIP)/ (UUP)	Glyn Hanna (DUP)/ (Independent)	Harold McKee (TUV)/ (UUP)	Laura Devlin (SDLP)	Michael Rice (Sinn Féin)	Leeanne McEvoy (Sinn Féin)	Willie Clarke (Sinn Féin)
November 2021 Defection	Henry Reilly (DUP)/ (Independent)/ (TUV)/ (UKIP)/ (UUP)	Glyn Hanna (DUP)/ (Independent)	Harold McKee (TUV)/ (UUP)	Laura Devlin (SDLP)	Seán Doran (Sinn Féin)	Leeanne McEvoy (Sinn Féin)	Willie Clarke (Sinn Féin)
September 2021 Defection	Henry Reilly (DUP)/ (Independent)/ (TUV)/ (UKIP)/ (UUP)	Glyn Hanna (DUP)/ (Independent)	Harold McKee (TUV)/ (UUP)	Laura Devlin (SDLP)	Seán Doran (Sinn Féin)	Leeanne McEvoy (Sinn Féin)	Willie Clarke (Sinn Féin)
June 2021 Defection	Henry Reilly (DUP)/ (Independent)/ (TUV)/ (UKIP)/ (UUP)	Glyn Hanna (DUP)/ (Independent)	Harold McKee (TUV)/ (UUP)	Laura Devlin (SDLP)	Seán Doran (Sinn Féin)	Leeanne McEvoy (Sinn Féin)	Willie Clarke (Sinn Féin)
2019	Henry Reilly (DUP)/ (Independent)/ (TUV)/ (UKIP)/ (UUP)	Glyn Hanna (DUP)/ (Independent)	Harold McKee (TUV)/ (UUP)	Laura Devlin (SDLP)	Seán Doran (Sinn Féin)	Leeanne McEvoy (Sinn Féin)	Willie Clarke (Sinn Féin)
November 2016 Defection	Henry Reilly (DUP)/ (Independent)/ (TUV)/ (UKIP)/ (UUP)	Glyn Hanna (DUP)/ (Independent)	Jill Macauley (UUP)	Laura Devlin (SDLP)	Seán Doran (Sinn Féin)	Brian Quinn (SDLP)	Willie Clarke (Sinn Féin)
May 2016 Co-Option	Henry Reilly (DUP)/ (Independent)/ (TUV)/ (UKIP)/ (UUP)	Glyn Hanna (DUP)/ (Independent)	Jill Macauley (UUP)	Laura Devlin (SDLP)	Seán Doran (Sinn Féin)	Brian Quinn (SDLP)	Willie Clarke (Sinn Féin)
November 2015 Defection	Henry Reilly (DUP)/ (Independent)/ (TUV)/ (UKIP)/ (UUP)	Glyn Hanna (DUP)/ (Independent)	Harold McKee (UUP)	Laura Devlin (SDLP)	Seán Doran (Sinn Féin)	Brian Quinn (SDLP)	Willie Clarke (Sinn Féin)
2014	Henry Reilly (DUP)/ (Independent)/ (TUV)/ (UKIP)/ (UUP)	Glyn Hanna (DUP)/ (Independent)	Harold McKee (UUP)	Laura Devlin (SDLP)	Seán Doran (Sinn Féin)	Brian Quinn (SDLP)	Willie Clarke (Sinn Féin)
2011	Henry Reilly (DUP)/ (Independent)/ (TUV)/ (UKIP)/ (UUP)	William Burns (DUP)	Harold McKee (UUP)	Seán Rogers (SDLP)	Seán Doran (Sinn Féin)	5 seats 1985–2014	5 seats 1985–2014
2005	Henry Reilly (DUP)/ (Independent)/ (TUV)/ (UKIP)/ (UUP)	William Burns (DUP)	Isaac Hanna (UUP)	Michael Cole (SDLP)	Martin Connolly (Sinn Féin)	5 seats 1985–2014	5 seats 1985–2014
2001	Henry Reilly (DUP)/ (Independent)/ (TUV)/ (UKIP)/ (UUP)	William Burns (DUP)	Isaac Hanna (UUP)	Michael Cole (SDLP)	Martin Cunningham (Sinn Féin)	5 seats 1985–2014	5 seats 1985–2014
1997	Henry Reilly (DUP)/ (Independent)/ (TUV)/ (UKIP)/ (UUP)	William Burns (DUP)	Isaac Hanna (UUP)	Emmett Haughian (SDLP)	Michael Cunningham (SDLP)	5 seats 1985–2014	5 seats 1985–2014
1993	Henry Reilly (DUP)/ (Independent)/ (TUV)/ (UKIP)/ (UUP)	William Burns (DUP)	Isaac Hanna (UUP)	Emmett Haughian (SDLP)	Austin Crawford (SDLP)	5 seats 1985–2014	5 seats 1985–2014
1989	Henry Reilly (DUP)/ (Independent)/ (TUV)/ (UKIP)/ (UUP)	George Graham (DUP)/ (Protestant Unionist)	Arthur Coulter (UUP)	Emmett Haughian (SDLP)	Austin Crawford (SDLP)	5 seats 1985–2014	5 seats 1985–2014
1985	William Russell (UUP)	George Graham (DUP)/ (Protestant Unionist)	Arthur Coulter (UUP)	Colum Murnion (SDLP)	Patrick Young (Sinn Féin)	5 seats 1985–2014	5 seats 1985–2014

== 2023 Election ==
2019: 3 x Sinn Féin, 1 x SDLP, 1 x DUP, 1 x UUP, 1 x Independent

2023: 3 x Sinn Féin, 2 x DUP, 1 x SDLP, 1 x Alliance

2019–2023 Change: DUP and Alliance gain from UUP and Independent

The Mournes - 7 seats
Party	Candidate	FPv%	Count							
Party	Candidate	FPv%	1	2	3	4	5	6	7	8
DUP	Glyn Hanna*	17.50%	2,340							
Sinn Féin	Michael Rice*	15.26%	2,040							
Sinn Féin	Willie Clarke*	14.32%	1,915							
Sinn Féin	Leeanne McEvoy* †	12.29%	1,643	1,643.56	1,946.14					
SDLP	Laura Devlin*	10.25%	1,370	1,372.80	1,379.64	1,476.76	1,516.30	1,679.41		
DUP	Henry Reilly*	8.15%	1,089	1,622.96	1,623.68	1,623.86	1,626.14	1,626.31	1,638.11	1,835.11
Alliance	Jill Truesdale	8.27%	1,105	1,108.64	1,116.38	1,140.32	1,206.76	1,249.09	1.505.94	1,626.94
TUV	Harold McKee*	6.58%	880	962.68	963.06	963.24	966.24	966.24	972.61	1,163.12
UUP	Lloyd Douglas	3.82%	511	537.88	538.06	538.60	539.60	540.45	557.70	
SDLP	Dominic O'Reilly	2.67%	357	359.62	386.52	439.26	443.16	467.13		
Green (NI)	Sean O Baoill	0.89%	119	119.28	120.36	127.02				
Electorate: 22,227 Valid: 13,369 (60.15%) Spoilt: 179 Quota: 1,672 Turnout: 13,548 (60.95%)

== 2019 Election ==
2014: 2 x Sinn Féin, 2 x SDLP, 1 x DUP, 1 x UUP, 1 x UKIP

2019: 3 x Sinn Féin, 1 x SDLP, 1 x DUP, 1 x UUP, 1 x Independent

2014-2019 Change: Sinn Féin gain from SDLP, Independent leaves UKIP

The Mournes - 7 seats
Party	Candidate	FPv%	Count						
Party	Candidate	FPv%	1	2	3	4	5	6	7
DUP	Glyn Hanna* ‡‡	16.06%	1,944						
Sinn Féin	Sean Doran* †	15.57%	1,885						
SDLP	Laura Devlin*	12.99%	1,572						
UUP	Harold McKee ‡	12.02%	1,455	1,697					
Independent	Henry Reilly* ‡	11.95%	1,447	1,619.92					
Sinn Féin	Willie Clarke*	9.53%	1,154	1,154.44	1,283.64	1,283.86	1,426.54	1,426.98	1,445.42
Sinn Féin	Leeanne McEvoy	9.06%	1,097	1,098.32	1,269.92	1,269.92	1,372.32	1,372.54	1,379.86
Alliance	Andrew McMurray	7.79%	943	945.2	951	1,014.36	1,280.88	1,320.7	1,349.02
SDLP	Brian Quinn*	5.01%	607	612.06	675.26	735.32			
Electorate: 21,013 Valid: 12,104 (57.60%) Spoilt: 158 Quota: 1,514 Turnout: 12,262 (58.35%)

== 2014 Election ==
2011: 1 x UKIP, x UUP, 1 x DUP, 1 x SDLP, 1 x Sinn Féin

2014: 2 x Sinn Féin, 2 x SDLP, 1 x UKIP, 1 x UUP, 1 x DUP

2011-2014 Change: Sinn Féin and SDLP gain due to the addition of two seats

The Mournes - 7 seats
Party	Candidate	FPv%	Count					
Party	Candidate	FPv%	1	2	3	4	5	6
UKIP	Henry Reilly* ‡	18.07%	1,964					
SDLP	Laura Devlin*	16.45%	1,789					
Sinn Féin	Willie Clarke*	14.55%	1,581					
Sinn Féin	Seán Doran*	13.92%	1,513					
UUP	Harold McKee*†	12.44%	1,352	1,677.5				
SDLP	Brian Quinn*	7.32%	796	804.06	1,131.3	1,134.4	1,291.72	1,416.72
DUP	Glyn Hanna	8.95%	973	1,161.17	1,168.73	1,307.61	1,311.52	1,321.52
UUP	Jill Macauley*	4.55%	494	550.42	556.36	727.48	728.86	752.86
Alliance	Ciaran McAvoy	2.39%	260	263.41	322.81	324.67	368.83	
NI21	Annette Holden	1.36%	148	153.27	168.39	169.32	183.58	
Electorate: 20,008 Valid: 10,869 (54.32%) Spoilt: 173 Quota: 1,359 Turnout: 11,042 (55.19%)

== 2011 Election ==
2005: 2 x UUP, 1 x DUP, 1 x SDLP, 1 x Sinn Féin

2011: 1 x UKIP, x UUP, 1 x DUP, 1 x SDLP, 1 x Sinn Féin

2005-2011 Change: UKIP gain from UUP

The Mournes - 5 seats
Party	Candidate	FPv%	Count					
Party	Candidate	FPv%	1	2	3	4	5	6
UKIP	Henry Reilly*	27.66%	1,910					
Sinn Féin	Sean Doran	19.46%	1,344					
SDLP	Seán Rogers	14.34%	990	999.6	1,110.94	1,133.43	1,533.43	
DUP	William Burns*	11.35%	784	972.4	973.16	1,124.96	1,136.17	1,151.17
UUP	Harold McKee*	8.47%	585	846.2	846.2	966	975.48	992.48
UUP	David McCauley	7.10%	490	641.2	642.34	724.33	731.68	768.68
SDLP	Theresa McLaverty	6.37%	440	445.6	513.62	544.98		
TUV	Arthur Coulter	3.33%	230	323.6	323.98			
DUP	Michelle Burns	0.83%	57	89.4	90.35			
Green (NI)	Heather McDermott	1.09%	75	79.4	88.52			
Electorate: 11,005 Valid: 6,905 (62.74%) Spoilt: 99 Quota: 1,151 Turnout: 7,004 (63.64%)

== 2005 Election ==
2001: 2 x UUP, 1 x DUP, 1 x SDLP, 1 x Sinn Féin

2005: 2 x UUP, 1 x DUP, 1 x SDLP, 1 x Sinn Féin

2001-2005 Change: No change

The Mournes - 5 seats
Party	Candidate	FPv%	Count					
Party	Candidate	FPv%	1	2	3	4	5	6
DUP	William Burns*	25.30%	1,793					
UUP	Henry Reilly*	17.47%	1,238					
UUP	Isaac Hanna*	7.75%	549	636.72	859.5	865.5	1,337.36	
SDLP	Michael Cole*	13.41%	950	952.04	955.72	1,095.72	1,105.48	1,129.62
Sinn Féin	Martin Connolly	12.24%	867	867.34	867.34	1,029.34	1,030.34	1,032.04
SDLP	Marian Fitzpatrick	9.78%	693	693.34	695.68	679.68	886.46	928.62
DUP	Linda Burns	1.06%	75	524.14	688.48	688.48		
Independent	Martin Cunningham*	7.89%	559	559	559.34			
Independent	Arthur Coulter	5.11%	362	427.62				
Electorate: 10,207 Valid: 7,086 (69.42%) Spoilt: 139 Quota: 1,182 Turnout: 7,225 (70.78%)

== 2001 Election ==
1997: 2 x UUP, 2 x SDLP, 1 x DUP

2001: 2 x UUP, 1 x SDLP, 1 x DUP, 1 x Sinn Féin

1997-2001 Change: No change

The Mournes - 5 seats
Party	Candidate	FPv%	Count			
Party	Candidate	FPv%	1	2	3	4
DUP	William Burns*	24.00%	1,845			
Sinn Féin	Martin Cunningham	16.80%	1,291			
UUP	Isaac Hanna*	15.33%	1,178	1,219	1,520.08	
UUP	Henry Reilly*	15.42%	1,185	1,209	1,455.87	
SDLP	Michael Cole	15.68%	1,205	1,208	1,213.85	1,245.83
SDLP	Marian Fitzpatrick	11.35%	872	874	875.56	893.5
DUP	Linda Burns	1.43%	110			
Electorate: 10,440 Valid: 7,686 (73.62%) Spoilt: 170 Quota: 1,282 Turnout: 7,856 (75.25%)

== 1997 Election ==
1993: 2 x UUP, 2 x SDLP, 1 x DUP

1997: 2 x UUP, 2 x SDLP, 1 x DUP

1993-1997 Change: No change

The Mournes - 5 seats
Party	Candidate	FPv%	Count						
Party	Candidate	FPv%	1	2	3	4	5	6	7
UUP	Isaac Hanna*	23.12%	1,595						
UUP	Henry Reilly*	18.88%	1,303						
SDLP	Emmett Haughian*	17.33%	1,196						
DUP	William Burns*	13.14%	907	1,266.89					
SDLP	Michael Cunningham	12.97%	895	898.48	901.47	903.99	931.28	939.18	1,193.18
Alliance	Anne Marie Cunningham	5.12%	353	390.7	423.82	449.65	470.61	569.66	657.95
Sinn Féin	Paul Lawless	6.83%	471	471.58	471.58	471.58	481.58	482.58	
Independent	Cecil Atkinson	1.48%	102	133.9	238.09	321.25	326.95		
Workers' Party	Charles Cunningham	1.13%	78	81.77	89.59	93.37			
Electorate: 10,084 Valid: 6,900 (68.43%) Spoilt: 127 Quota: 1,151 Turnout: 7,027 (69.68%)

== 1993 Election ==
1989: 2 x UUP, 2 x SDLP, 1 x Protestant Unionist

1993: 2 x UUP, 2 x SDLP, 1 x DUP

1989-1993 Change: DUP gain from Protestant Unionist

The Mournes - 5 seats
Party	Candidate	FPv%	Count		
Party	Candidate	FPv%	1	2	3
UUP	Henry Reilly*	24.57%	1,647		
UUP	Isaac Hanna	22.20%	1,488		
SDLP	Emmett Haughian*	22.13%	1,483		
DUP	William Burns	12.77%	856	1,371.55	
SDLP	Austin Crawford*	14.71%	986	997.2	1,198.2
Sinn Féin	Michael McAleenan	3.61%	242	242.35	245.35
Electorate: 9,729 Valid: 6,702 (68.89%) Spoilt: 191 Quota: 1,118 Turnout: 6,893 (70.85%)

== 1989 Election ==
1985: 2 x UUP, 1 x SDLP, 1 x DUP, 1 x Sinn Féin

1989: 2 x UUP, 2 x SDLP, 1 x Protestant Unionist

1985-1989 Change: SDLP gain from Sinn Féin, Protestant Unionist leaves DUP

The Mournes - 5 seats
Party	Candidate	FPv%	Count				
Party	Candidate	FPv%	1	2	3	4	5
Protestant Unionist	George Graham*	25.18%	1,754				
SDLP	Emmett Haughian	18.79%	1,309				
UUP	Henry Reilly	16.91%	1,178				
SDLP	Austin Crawford	13.64%	950	952.38	1,078.88	1,443.88	
UUP	Arthur Coulter*	9.10%	634	911.1	911.76	927.78	947.78
DUP	George McConnell	8.46%	589	890.58	890.69	893.92	897.92
Independent	Mark Brennan	4.87%	339	341.04	349.62		
Sinn Féin	Gabriel Curran	3.06%	213	213.34	218.29		
Electorate: 9,812 Valid: 6,966 (70.99%) Spoilt: 184 Quota: 1,162 Turnout: 7,150 (72.87%)

== 1985 Election ==
1985: 2 x UUP, 1 x SDLP, 1 x DUP, 1 x Sinn Féin

The Mournes - 5 seats
Party	Candidate	FPv%	Count					
Party	Candidate	FPv%	1	2	3	4	5	6
DUP	George Graham*	22.20%	1,422					
UUP	William Russell*	21.71%	1,391					
UUP	Arthur Coulter*	12.52%	802	935.25	1,231.72			
SDLP	Colum Murnion*	16.52%	1,058	1,060.5	1,060.96	1,062.31	1,638.31	
Sinn Féin	Patrick Young	12.80%	820	820.25	820.48	820.63	866.86	1,134.86
DUP	William Burns	4.21%	270	485.5	503.9	655.1	661.61	673.61
SDLP	Anne Marie Cunningham*	10.04%	643	644	646.3	649.3		
Electorate: 9,530 Valid: 6,406 (67.22%) Spoilt: 189 Quota: 1,068 Turnout: 6,595 (69.20%)
