= 2023 Newry, Mourne and Down District Council election =

Northern Ireland local election

- 18 May 2023

All 41 council seats 21 seats needed for a majority
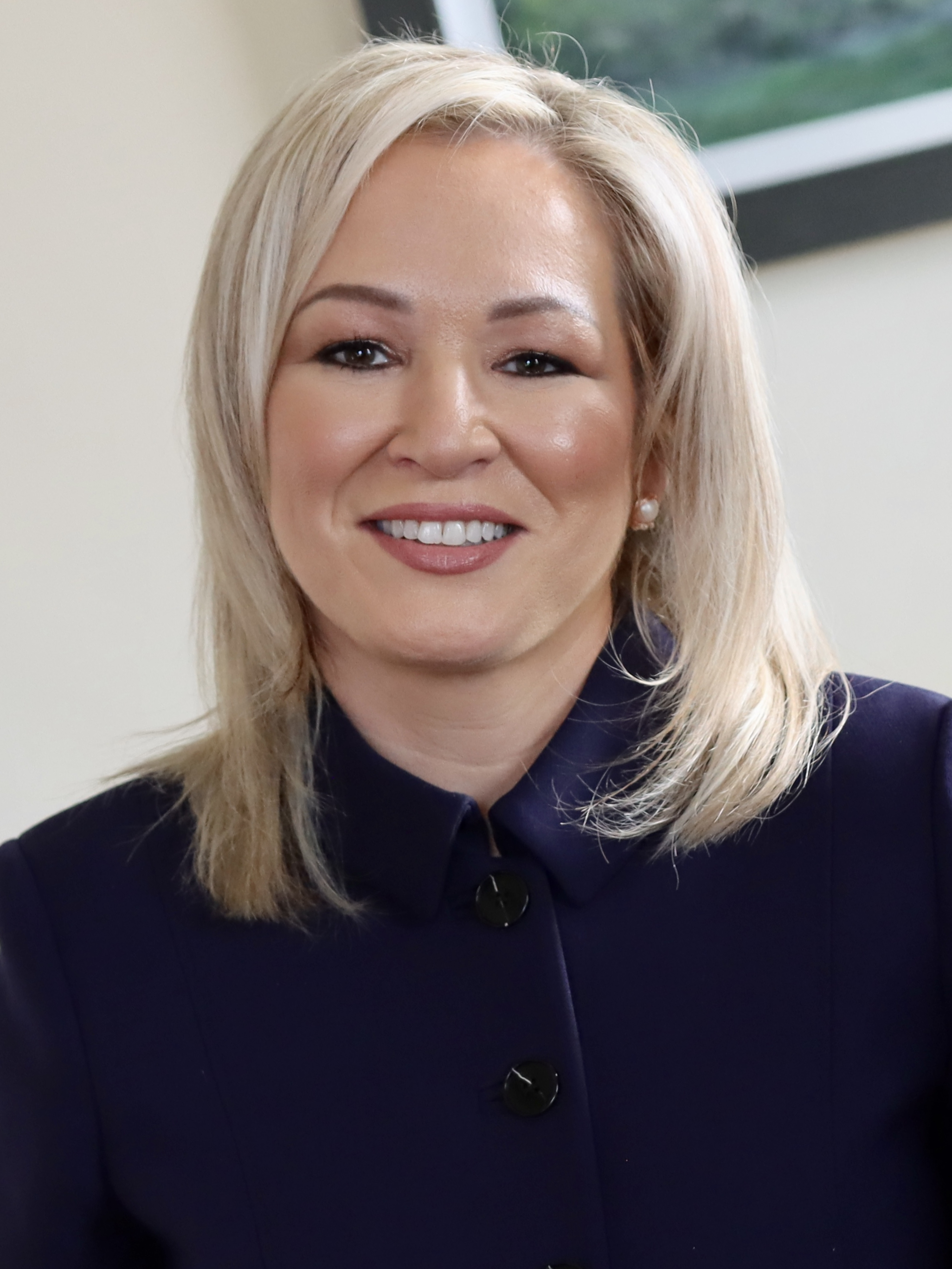

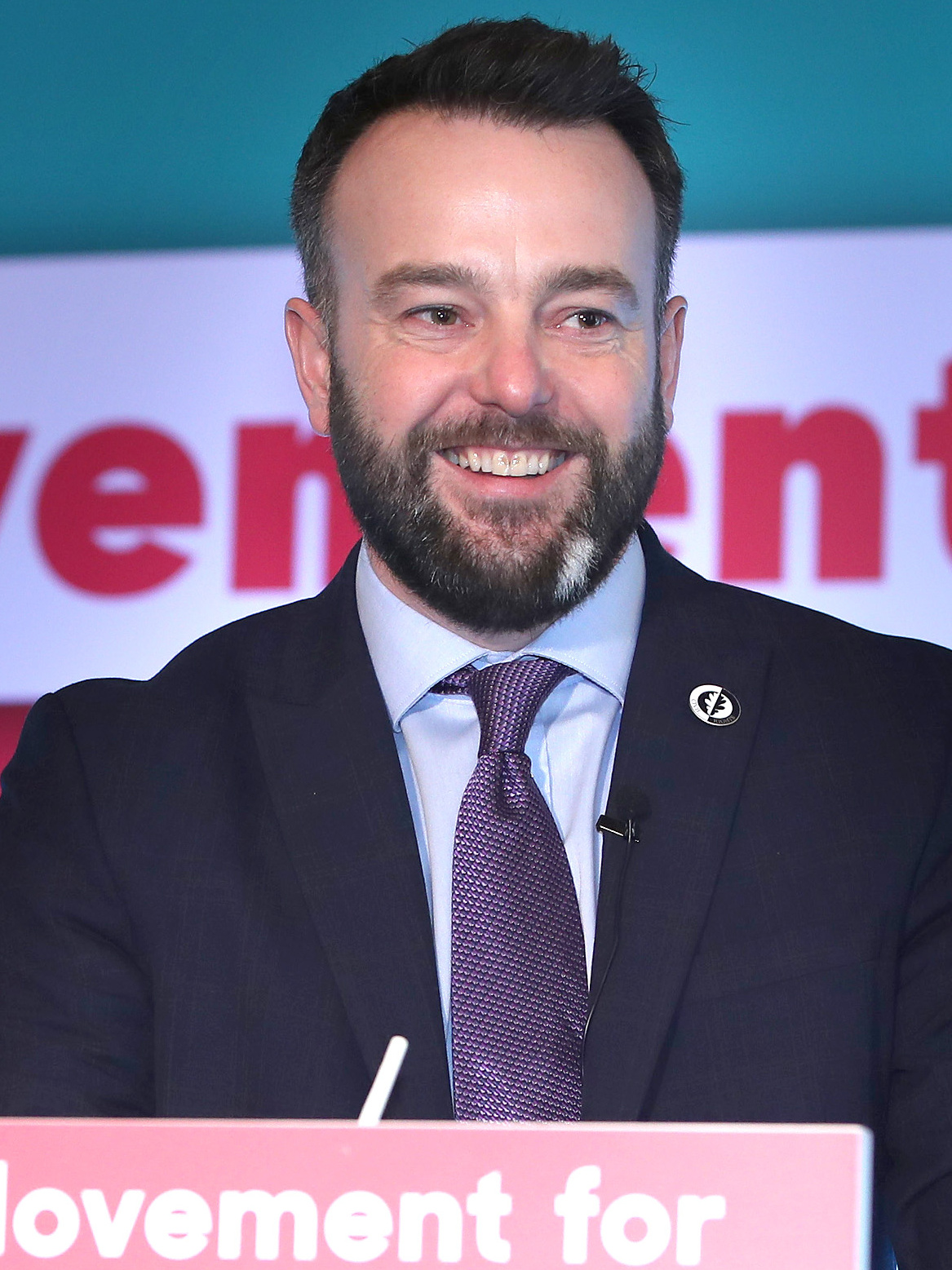

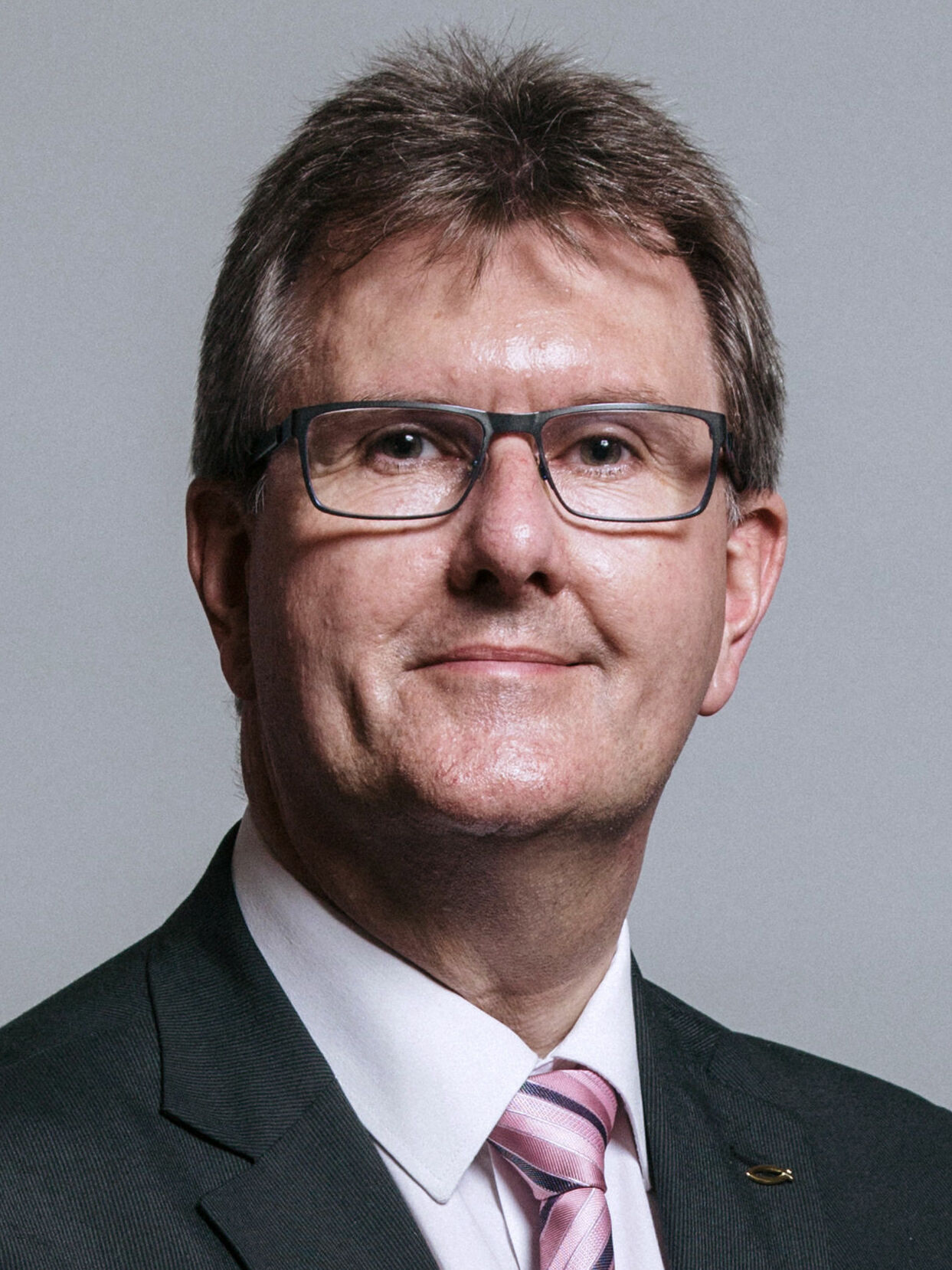

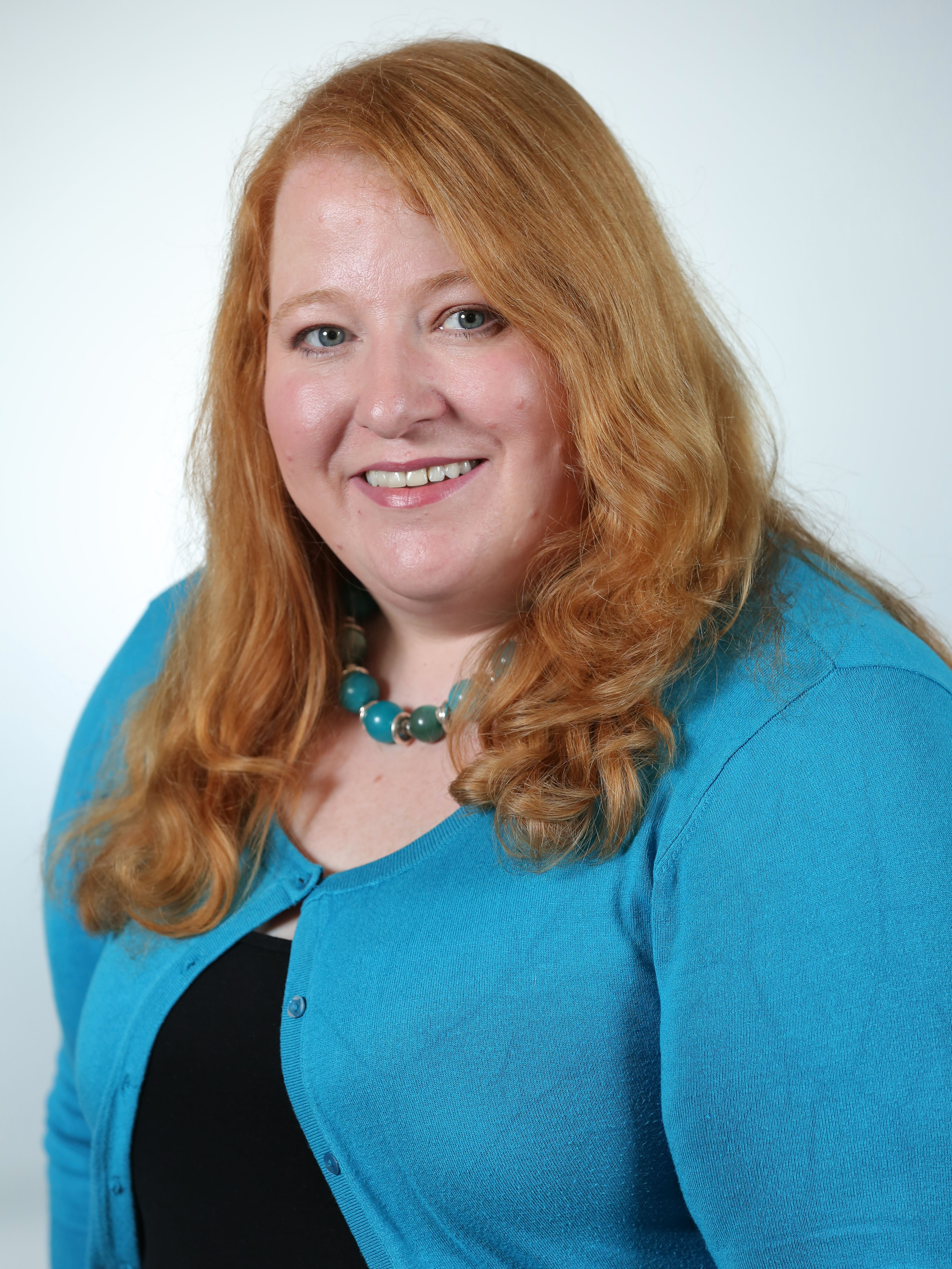

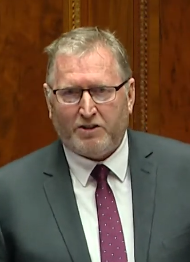
	First party	Second party	Third party
Leader	Michelle O'Neill (Note: The leader of Sinn Féin is Mary Lou McDonald, who sits as a TD in the Irish Dáil Éireann for Dublin Central. O'Neill is the leader of the party in Northern Ireland.)	Colum Eastwood	Jeffrey Donaldson
Party	Sinn Féin	SDLP	DUP
Last election	16	11	3
Seats won	20	8	5
Seat change	▲4	▼3	▲2
Popular vote	37,032	13,170	9,124
Percentage	48.3%	17.2%	11.9%
Swing	▲11.8%	▼5.8%	▲3.4%
	Fourth party	Fifth party	Sixth party
Leader	Naomi Long		Doug Beattie
Party	Alliance	Independent	UUP
Last election	2	5	4
Seats won	5	2	1
Seat change	▲3	▼3	▼3
Popular vote	7,176	3,608	4,062
Percentage	9.4%	4.7%	5.3%
Swing	▲2.0%	▼7.8%	▼4.7%
- Newry, Mourne and Down 2023 Council Election Results by DEA (Shaded by the plurality of FPVs)
Council control before election
No overall control
Council control after election
No overall control

The 2023 election to Newry, Mourne and Down District Council was held on 18 May 2023, alongside other local elections in Northern Ireland, two weeks after local elections in England. The Northern Ireland elections were delayed by 2 weeks to avoid overlapping with the coronation of King Charles III.

41 members were returned to the council via Single Transferable Vote.

== Election results ==
Newry, Mourne and Down Borough Council Election Result 2023
Party	Seats	Gains	Losses	Net gain/loss	Seats %	Votes %	Votes	+/−
Sinn Féin	20	4	0	▲4	48.78	48.32	37,032	▲11.79
SDLP	8	0	3	▼3	19.51	17.18	13,170	▼5.86
DUP	5	2	0	▲2	12.20	11.90	9,124	▲3.40
Alliance	5	3	0	▲3	12.20	9.36	7,176	▲1.92
Independent	2	0	3	▼3	4.88	4.71	3,608	▼7.78
UUP	1	0	3	▼3	2.44	5.30	4,062	▼4.73
Aontú	0	0	0	0	0.00	1.31	1,002	▼0.21
TUV	0	0	0	0	0.00	1.15	880	New
Green (NI)	0	0	0	0	0.00	0.77	589	▲0.32
Total	41						76,643	

Note: "Votes" are the first preference votes.

The 2023 LG election in NMD saw the further decline of the SDLP and UUP, whereas Sinn Fein and Alliance made gains, with the DUP also gaining two councillors.

== Districts summary ==
Results of the 2023 Newry, Mourne and Down District Council election by DEA
District Electoral Area (DEA)	%	Cllrs	%	Cllrs	%	Cllrs	%	Cllrs	%	Cllrs	%	Cllrs	Total cllrs
District Electoral Area (DEA)	Sinn Féin		SDLP		DUP		Alliance		UUP		Independents and others		Total cllrs
Crotlieve	45.67	3 ▲1	17.74	1 ▼1	4.57	0	5.03	0	3.42	0	23.57	2	6
Downpatrick	43.45	2 ▲1	30.71	2 ▼1	3.27	0	13.75	1 ▲1	2.45	0	6.37	0 ▼1	5
Newry	65.15	4 ▲1	18.15	2	0.00	0	7.94	0	2.72	0	6.04	0 ▼1	6
Rowallane	10.78	0	16.42	1	34.17	2	24.59	2 ▲1	12.91	0 ▼1	1.12	0	5
Slieve Croob	47.56	3 ▲1	11.68	0 ▼1	19.34	1 ▲1	13.28	1	4.30	0 ▼1	3.85	0	5
Slieve Gullion	67.92	5	16.00	1	2.45	0	2.03	0	8.15	1	3.46	0	7
The Mournes	41.87	3	12.91	1	25.65	2 ▲1	8.27	1 ▲1	3.82	0 ▼1	7.47	0 ▼1	7
Total	48.32	20 ▲4	17.18	8 ▼3	11.90	5 ▲2	9.36	5 ▲3	5.30	1 ▼3	7.93	2 ▼3	41

== District results ==
=== Crotlieve ===
2019: 2 x Sinn Féin, 2 x SDLP, 2 x Independent

2023: 3 x Sinn Féin, 2 x Independent, 1 x SDLP

2019–2023 Change: Sinn Féin gain from SDLP

Crotlieve - 6 seats
Party	Candidate	FPv%	Count									
Party	Candidate	FPv%	1	2	3	4	5	6	7	8	9	10
Sinn Féin	Selina Murphy	14.20%	1,863	1,879.00								
SDLP	Declan McAteer*	9.40%	1,233	1,310.00	1,324.00	1,473.00	1,577.00	1,683.00	1,683.25	2,507.25		
Independent	Mark Gibbons*	8.47%	1,111	1,143.00	1,150.00	1,242.00	1,610.00	1,721.00	1,721.75	1,793.75	1,888.75	
Sinn Féin	Kate Murphy	10.65%	1,397	1,402.00	1,403.00	1,453.00	1,491.00	1,493.00	1,494.50	1,611.50	1,771.50	1,774.62
Sinn Féin	Mickey Ruane*	10.57%	1,387	1,413.00	1,413.00	1,446.00	1,570.00	1,574.00	1,575.00	1,618.00	1,669.00	1,670.04
Independent	Jarlath Tinnelly*	7.95%	1,043	1,059.00	1,063.00	1,142.00	1,252.00	1,306.00	1,306.25	1,367.25	1,504.25	1,513.35
Sinn Féin	Gerry O'Hare*	10.25%	1,345	1,350.00	1,350.00	1,376.00	1,389.00	1,391.00	1,391.00	1,447.00	1,512.00	1,512.26
SDLP	Karen McKevitt*	6.94%	911	948.00	964.00	1,130.00	1,189.00	1,305.00	1,305.25			
DUP	Keith Parke	4.57%	600	603.00	946.00	957.00	965.00					
Independent	Jim Boylan	6.24%	818	841.00	850.00	926.00						
Alliance	Daniel Neary	5.03%	660	710.00	742.00							
UUP	Ricky McGaffin	3.42%	448	451.00								
SDLP	Anne Sheridan	1.40%	183									
Green (NI)	Hugh O'Reilly	0.73%	96									
Independent	Finbarr Lambe	0.18%	23									
Electorate: 21,313 Valid: 13,118 (61.55%) Spoilt: 140 Quota: 1,875 Turnout: 13,258 (62.21%)

=== Downpatrick ===
2019: 3 x SDLP, 1 x Sinn Féin, 1 x Independent

2023: 2 x Sinn Féin, 2 x SDLP, 1 x Alliance

2019–2023 Change: Sinn Féin and Alliance gain from SDLP and Independent

Downpatrick - 5 seats
Party	Candidate	FPv%	Count									
Party	Candidate	FPv%	1	2	3	4	5	6	7	8	9	10
Sinn Féin	Oonagh Hanlon*	19.32%	1,579									
SDLP	Gareth Sharvin* †	15.99%	1,307	1,325.59	1,348.72	1,360.98	1,388.78					
Alliance	Cadogan Enright* ‡	13.75%	1,124	1,131.67	1,172.67	1,209.67	1,334.80	1,377.80				
Sinn Féin	Philip Campbell	14.19%	1,160	1,262.70	1,266.70	1,268.70	1,271.70	1,377.70				
SDLP	Conor Galbraith	7.22%	590	597.41	608.41	617.41	641.41	705.06	711.06	718.34	721.23	1,166.23
Sinn Féin	Louise Rooney	9.94%	812	866.08	877.21	877.47	877.60	946.11	946.11	950.03	959.38	1,057.38
SDLP	Aurla King	7.50%	613	620.67	629.67	643.67	666.67	705.80	712.80	716.16	717.86	
Independent	Éamon Mac Con Midhe	4.94%	404	409.46	415.72	418.72	435.72					
DUP	Sharon Harvey	3.27%	267	267.26	268.26	388.26						
UUP	Alexander Burgess	2.45%	200	200.52	201.52							
Green (NI)	Declan Walsh	1.43%	117	117.65								
Electorate: 15,691 Valid: 8,173 (52.09%) Spoilt: 113 Quota: 1,363 Turnout: 8,286 (52.81%)

=== Newry ===
2019: 3 x Sinn Féin, 2 x SDLP, 1 x Independent

2023: 4 x Sinn Féin, 2 x SDLP

2019–2023 Change: Sinn Féin gain from Independent

Newry - 6 seats
Party	Candidate	FPv%	Count					
Party	Candidate	FPv%	1	2	3	4	5	6
Sinn Féin	Valerie Harte*	19.95%	2,085					
Sinn Féin	Cathal King*	18.96%	1,982					
Sinn Féin	Geraldine Kearns*	12.05%	1,259	1,719.88				
Sinn Féin	Aidan Mathers	14.19%	1,483	1,526.96				
SDLP	Michael Savage* †	8.95%	935	949.84	1,151.03	1,192.47	1,203.34	1,382.34
SDLP	Doire Finn	9.20%	961	994.04	1,120.89	1,211.33	1,226.98	1,357.98
Alliance	Helena Young	7.94%	830	845.68	925.33	963.69	988.12	1,199.12
Aontú	Sharon Loughran	3.04%	318	322.20	356.42	372.94	386.24	
UUP	Andrew McCracken	2.72%	285	285.00	287.95	289.35	289.35	
Independent	Mariya Krupska	2.00%	209	213.76	237.95	248.03	272.10	
Workers' Party	Nicola Grant	1.00%	104	106.24	123.94	130.66		
Electorate: 19,901 Valid: 10,451 (52.51%) Spoilt: 172 Quota: 1,494 Turnout: 10,623 (53.38%)

=== Rowallane ===
2019: 2 x DUP, 1 x UUP, 1 x Alliance, 1 x SDLP

2023: 2 x DUP, 2 x Alliance, 1 x SDLP

2019–2023 Change: Alliance gain from UUP

Rowallane - 5 seats
Party	Candidate	FPv%	Count			
Party	Candidate	FPv%	1	2	3	4
DUP	Jonny Jackson*	17.60%	1,414			
SDLP	Terry Andrews*	16.42%	1,319	1,335	1,860	
DUP	Callum Bowsie*	16.57%	1,331	1,337	1,340	
Alliance	Tierna Kelly	12.01%	965	996	1,118	1,403
Alliance	David Lee-Surginor*	12.58%	1,011	1,056	1,199	1,347
UUP	Robert Burgess*	11.66%	937	1,018	1,021	1,024
Sinn Féin	Dermot Kennedy	10.78%	866	872		
UUP	Rachel Gracey	1.26%	101			
Green (NI)	Ali McColl	1.12%	90			
Electorate: 15,865 Valid: 8,034 (50.64%) Spoilt: 81 Quota: 1,340 Turnout: 8,115 (51.15%)

=== Slieve Croob ===
2019: 2 x Sinn Féin, 1 x SDLP, 1 x UUP, 1 x Alliance

2023: 3 x Sinn Féin, 1 x DUP, 1 x Alliance

2019–2023 Change: Sinn Féin and DUP gain from SDLP and UUP

Slieve Croob - 5 seats
Party	Candidate	FPv%	Count					
Party	Candidate	FPv%	1	2	3	4	5	6
DUP	Alan Lewis*	19.34%	1,723					
Sinn Féin	Jim Brennan*	17.61%	1,569					
Sinn Féin	Róisín Howell*	16.19%	1,443	1,443.14	1,447.14	1,484.39	1,531.39	
Alliance	Andrew McMurray* †	13.28%	1,183	1,189.02	1,244.02	1,246.77	1,327.02	1,521.02
Sinn Féin	Siobhan O'Hare	13.76%	1,226	1,226.42	1,232.42	1,259.87	1,301.47	1,305.87
SDLP	Hugh Gallagher*	8.48%	756	758.80	771.80	778.50	1,082.18	1,170.54
UUP	Walter Lyons	4.30%	383	603.36	604.50	604.55	607.25	
SDLP	Will Polland	3.20%	285	286.40	299.40	302.45		
Aontú	Rosemary McGlone	2.75%	245	245.70	248.70	249.50		
Green (NI)	Seana Pitt	1.10%	98	98.70				
Electorate: 15,797 Valid: 8,911 (56.41%) Spoilt: 92 Quota: 1,486 Turnout: 9,003 (56.99%)

=== Slieve Gullion ===
2019: 5 x Sinn Féin, 1 x SDLP, 1 x UUP

2023: 5 x Sinn Féin, 1 x SDLP, 1 x UUP

2019–2023 Change: No change

Slieve Gullion - 7 seats
Party	Candidate	FPv%	Count								
Party	Candidate	FPv%	1	2	3	4	5	6	7	8	9
Sinn Féin	Aoife Finnegan* †	13.16%	1,934								
Sinn Féin	Áine Quinn	13.15%	1,932								
Sinn Féin	Declan Murphy*	12.98%	1,907								
SDLP	Pete Byrne*	9.85%	1,447	1,462.30	1,468.30	1,472.54	1,473.35	1,554.56	1,670.23	2,404.23	
Sinn Féin	Mickey Larkin*	10.61%	1,558	1,573.26	1,579.30	1,640.54	1,645.61	1,669.12	1,719.61	1,795.24	1,946.24
Sinn Féin	Oonagh Magennis*	8.96%	1,316	1,368.55	1,376.60	1,379.62	1,387.95	1,411.32	1,445.60	1,511.77	1,617.77
UUP	David Taylor*	8.15%	1,197	1,197	1,198	1,198	1,198.09	1,226.09	1,570.09	1,592.15	1,628.15
Sinn Féin	Barra Ó'Muirí*	9.06%	1,331	1,339.30	1,343.30	1,348.86	1,385.76	1,393.08	1,432.23	1,463.35	1,503.35
SDLP	Killian Feehan	6.15%	903	904.20	913.20	913.72	917.72	1,015.85	1,102.07		
Aontú	Liam Reichenberg	2.99%	439	439.50	446.50	447.66	448.05	489.09			
DUP	Linda Henry	2.45%	360	360.10	360.10	360.14	360.14	360.14			
Alliance	Caolán Gregory	2.03%	298	298.90	321.95	322.47	323.10				
Green (NI)	Molly Ní Mhánais	0.47%	69	69.15							
Electorate: 22,734 Valid: 14,691 (64.62%) Spoilt: 266 Quota: 1,837 Turnout: 14,957 (65.79%)

=== The Mournes ===
2019: 3 x Sinn Féin, 1 x SDLP, 1 x DUP, 1 x UUP, 1 x Independent

2023: 3 x Sinn Féin, 2 x DUP, 1 x SDLP, 1 x Alliance

2019–2023 Change: DUP and Alliance gain from UUP and Independent

The Mournes - 7 seats
Party	Candidate	FPv%	Count							
Party	Candidate	FPv%	1	2	3	4	5	6	7	8
DUP	Glyn Hanna*	17.50%	2,340							
Sinn Féin	Michael Rice*	15.26%	2,040							
Sinn Féin	Willie Clarke*	14.32%	1,915							
Sinn Féin	Leeanne McEvoy* †	12.29%	1,643	1,643.56	1,946.14					
SDLP	Laura Devlin*	10.25%	1,370	1,372.80	1,379.64	1,476.76	1,516.30	1,679.41		
DUP	Henry Reilly*	8.15%	1,089	1,622.96	1,623.68	1,623.86	1,626.14	1,626.31	1,638.11	1,835.11
Alliance	Jill Truesdale	8.27%	1,105	1,108.64	1,116.38	1,140.32	1,206.76	1,249.09	1.505.94	1,626.94
TUV	Harold McKee*	6.58%	880	962.68	963.06	963.24	966.24	966.24	972.61	1,163.12
UUP	Lloyd Douglas	3.82%	511	537.88	538.06	538.60	539.60	540.45	557.70	
SDLP	Dominic O'Reilly	2.67%	357	359.62	386.52	439.26	443.16	467.13		
Green (NI)	Sean O Baoill	0.89%	119	119.28	120.36	127.02				
Electorate: 22,227 Valid: 13,369 (60.15%) Spoilt: 179 Quota: 1,672 Turnout: 13,548 (60.95%)

== Changes during the term ==
=== † Co-options ===
Date co-opted	Electoral Area	Party	Outgoing	Co-optee	Reason
13 November 2023	Newry	SDLP	Michael Savage	Killian Feehan	Savage resigned.
24 May 2024	Slieve Croob	Alliance	Andrew McMurray	Helena Young	McMurray was co-opted to the Northern Ireland Assembly.
7 March 2025	Slieve Gullion	Sinn Féin	Aoife Finnegan	Martin Hearty	Finnegan was co-opted to the Northern Ireland Assembly.
10 September 2025	Downpatrick	SDLP	Gareth Sharvin	Aurla King	Sharvin resigned.
18 December 2025	The Mournes	Sinn Féin	Leeanne McEvoy	Niall Lawlor	McEvoy resigned.

=== ‡ Changes in affiliation ===
Date	Electoral Area	Name	Previous affiliation	New affiliation	Circumstance
30 July 2025	Downpatrick	Cadogan Enright	Alliance	Independent	Left Alliance due to disagreements over local issues such as the Downe Hospital.
