= Willie Clarke (politician) =

Irish republican politician (born 1966)

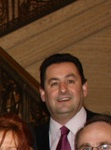

Member of Newry, Mourne and Down District Council
- Incumbent
- Assumed office 22 May 2014
- Constituency: The Mournes

Member of the Legislative Assembly for South Down
- In office 26 November 2003 – 13 April 2012
- Preceded by: Eamon O'Neill
- Succeeded by: Chris Hazzard

Personal details
- Born: 13 October 1966 (age 59) Newcastle, County Down, Northern Ireland
- Party: Sinn Féin
- Website: Willie Clarke MLA

Willie Clarke (born 13 October 1966) is an Irish Sinn Féin politician, serving as a Newry, Mourne and Down Councillor for The Mournes DEA since 2014. He was a Member of the Northern Ireland Assembly (MLA) for South Down from 2003 to 2012.

== Career ==
Clarke was first elected to Down District Council at the 2001 election, representing the Newcastle District.

He was elected to the Northern Ireland Assembly at the 2003 election for South Down.

Clarke retained his Council seat at the 2005 and 2011 local elections. He was also re-elected to the Assembly at the 2011 election.

On 21 February 2012, he announced he would resign as an MLA to concentrate on his work as a Down District councillor. In April 2012, party colleague Chris Hazzard succeeded him as MLA.

Clarke was later elected onto the successor Newry, Mourne and Down District Council at the 2014 local elections, as a representative for The Mournes District, and was re-elected in 2019 and 2023.

Northern Ireland Assembly
Preceded by Eamon O'Neill	MLA for Down South; 2003–2012	Succeeded by Chris Hazzard
