= Slieve Croob (District Electoral Area) =

District electoral area in Northern Ireland

- Newry, Mourne and Down District Council DEA constituency

Current constituency
- Created: 2014
- Seats: 5 (2014-)
- Councillors: Jim Brennan (SF); Róisín Howell (SF); Alan Lewis (DUP); Siobhan O'Hare (SF); Helena Young (APNI)

Slieve Croob DEA within Newry, Mourne and Down

Slieve Croob is one of the seven district electoral areas (DEA) in Newry, Mourne and Down, Northern Ireland. The district elects five members to Newry, Mourne and Down District Council and contains the wards of Ballydugan, Ballyward, Castlewellan, Drumaness and Dundrum. Slieve Croob forms part of the South Down constituencies for the Northern Ireland Assembly and UK Parliament.

It was created for the 2014 local elections, replacing parts of the Ballynahinch DEA and parts of the Newcastle DEA which had both existed since 1985.

== Councillors ==
Election	Councillor (Party)	Councillor (Party)	Councillor (Party)	Councillor (Party)	Councillor (Party)
May 2024 co-option	Alan Lewis (DUP)/ (UUP)	Helena Young (Alliance)	Siobhan O'Hare (Sinn Féin)	Jim Brennan (Sinn Féin)	Róisín Howell (Sinn Féin)
2023	Alan Lewis (DUP)/ (UUP)	Andrew McMurray (Alliance)	Siobhan O'Hare (Sinn Féin)	Jim Brennan (Sinn Féin)	Róisín Howell (Sinn Féin)
August 2022 defection	Alan Lewis (DUP)/ (UUP)	Andrew McMurray (Alliance)	Hugh Gallagher (SDLP)	Jim Brennan (Sinn Féin)	Róisín Howell (Sinn Féin)
June 2022 co-option	Alan Lewis (DUP)/ (UUP)	Andrew McMurray (Alliance)	Hugh Gallagher (SDLP)	Jim Brennan (Sinn Féin)	Róisín Howell (Sinn Féin)
October 2019 co-option	Alan Lewis (DUP)/ (UUP)	Andrew McMurray (Alliance)	Hugh Gallagher (SDLP)	Cathy Mason (Sinn Féin)	Róisín Howell (Sinn Féin)
2019	Alan Lewis (DUP)/ (UUP)	Gregory Bain (Alliance)	Hugh Gallagher (SDLP)	Cathy Mason (Sinn Féin)	Róisín Howell (Sinn Féin)
February 2018 co-option	Garth Craig (DUP)	Andrew McMurray (Alliance)	Mark Murnin (SDLP)	John Rice (Sinn Féin)	Róisín Howell (Sinn Féin)
January 2018 co-option	Garth Craig (DUP)	Andrew McMurray (Alliance)	Mark Murnin (SDLP)	John Rice (Sinn Féin)	Stephen Burns (Sinn Féin)
November 2016 co-option	Garth Craig (DUP)	Andrew McMurray (Alliance)	Mark Murnin (SDLP)	Pól Ó Gribín (Sinn Féin)	Stephen Burns (Sinn Féin)
2014	Garth Craig (DUP)	Patrick Clarke (Alliance)	Mark Murnin (SDLP)	Pól Ó Gribín (Sinn Féin)	Stephen Burns (Sinn Féin)

== 2023 Election ==
2019: 2 x Sinn Féin, 1 x SDLP, 1 x UUP, 1 x Alliance

2023: 3 x Sinn Féin, 1 x DUP, 1 x Alliance

2019–2023 Change: Sinn Féin and DUP gain from SDLP and UUP

Slieve Croob - 5 seats
Party	Candidate	FPv%	Count					
Party	Candidate	FPv%	1	2	3	4	5	6
DUP	Alan Lewis*	19.34%	1,723					
Sinn Féin	Jim Brennan*	17.61%	1,569					
Sinn Féin	Róisín Howell*	16.19%	1,443	1,443.14	1,447.14	1,484.39	1,531.39	
Alliance	Andrew McMurray* †	13.28%	1,183	1,189.02	1,244.02	1,246.77	1,327.02	1,521.02
Sinn Féin	Siobhan O'Hare	13.76%	1,226	1,226.42	1,232.42	1,259.87	1,301.47	1,305.87
SDLP	Hugh Gallagher*	8.48%	756	758.80	771.80	778.50	1,082.18	1,170.54
UUP	Walter Lyons	4.30%	383	603.36	604.50	604.55	607.25	
SDLP	Will Polland	3.20%	285	286.40	299.40	302.45		
Aontú	Rosemary McGlone	2.75%	245	245.70	248.70	249.50		
Green (NI)	Seana Pitt	1.10%	98	98.70				
Electorate: 15,797 Valid: 8,911 (56.41%) Spoilt: 92 Quota: 1,486 Turnout: 9,003 (56.99%)

== 2019 Election ==
2014: 2 x Sinn Féin, 1 x Alliance, 1 x SDLP, 1 x DUP

2019: 2 x Sinn Féin, 1 x Alliance, 1 x SDLP, 1 x UUP

2014-2019 Change: UUP gain from DUP

Slieve Croob - 5 seats
Party	Candidate	FPv%	Count					
Party	Candidate	FPv%	1	2	3	4	5	6
UUP	Alan Lewis ‡	15.93%	1,303	1,307	2,115			
Sinn Féin	Roisin Howell*	12.65%	1,035	1,086	1,088	1,090	1,611	
Sinn Féin	Cathy Mason †	13.07%	1,069	1,117	1,119	1,120	1,373	
Alliance	Gregory Bain †	10.55%	863	915	932	1,194	1,217	1,241.84
SDLP	Hugh Gallagher	10.76%	880	969	986	1,041	1,086	1,222.16
SDLP	Mark Murnin*	9.73%	796	894	907	1,017	1,071	1,154.72
Sinn Féin	John Rice*	10.81%	884	907	907	908		
DUP	Maynard Hanna	10.61%	868	889				
Aontú	Tracy Harkin	5.88%	481					
Electorate: 14,846 Valid: 8,179 (55.09%) Spoilt: 111 Quota: 1,364 Turnout: 8,290 (55.84%)

== 2014 Election ==
2014: 2 x Sinn Féin, 1 x SDLP, 1 x DUP, 1 x Alliance

Slieve Croob - 5 seats
Party	Candidate	FPv%	Count						
Party	Candidate	FPv%	1	2	3	4	5	6	7
Sinn Féin	Stephen Burns* †	18.87%	1,303						
DUP	Garth Craig*	14.78%	1,021	1,028	1,028	1,166			
SDLP	Mark Murnin	11.35%	784	794	794	797	929.16	1,261.16	
Sinn Féin	Pól Ó Gribín †	13.61%	940	948	1,042.44	1,046.44	1,072	1,164	
Alliance	Patrick Clarke †	9.99%	690	738	749.04	771.04	807.84	971.84	1,068.59
UUP	Desmond Patterson*	10.40%	718	727	733.6	932.6	934.6	955.08	967.08
SDLP	Audrey Byrne	7.44%	514	521	544.88	551.88	781.76		
SDLP	Shane King	6.05%	418	425	438.68	445.8			
UKIP	Alan Lewis	5.89%	407	413	413.24				
NI21	Matthew Morrison	1.61%	111						
Electorate: 13,939 Valid: 6,906 (47.80%) Spoilt: 125 Quota: 1,152 Turnout: 7,031 (50.44%)
