= Henry Reilly =

Northern Irish unionist politician (born 1958)

Member of Newry, Mourne and Down District Council
- Incumbent
- Assumed office 22 May 2014
- Preceded by: Seat created
- Constituency: The Mournes

Member of Newry and Mourne District Council
- In office 17 May 1989 – 22 May 2014
- Preceded by: William Russell
- Succeeded by: Council abolished
- Constituency: The Mournes

Personal details
- Born: December 1958 (age 67) Kilkeel, Northern Ireland
- Party: DUP (since 2022); Independent Unionist (2016 - 2022); UKIP (2007 - 2015)
- Other political affiliations: TUV (2015 - 2016); Ulster Unionist (until 2007)

Henry Reilly (born December 1958) is a Northern Irish unionist politician, serving as a councillor for The Mournes in County Down since 1989. He became the 'Father of the Chamber' in 2023, having served on Newry, Mourne and Down District Council since its creation in 2014 and a further 25 years on the legacy Newry and Mourne District Council. Reilly joined the Democratic Unionist Party (DUP) in 2022.

== Biography ==
Reilly grew up on a farm in County Down and worked for the Department of Agriculture and Rural Development.

He later joined the Ulster Unionist Party (UUP), and was first elected to Newry and Mourne District Council at the 1989 local elections, representing The Mournes District. He held his seat in the Mournes in 1993, 1997, 2001 and 2005, serving as Mayor of Newry in 2004/05.

Initially a supporter of UUP leader David Trimble, by 2004, Reilly was publicly calling for him to resign. In 2007, Reilly left the UUP and then went on to join the UK Independence Party (UKIP), becoming its first councillor in Northern Ireland. He was subsequently appointed as Chairman of the Northern Ireland Regional branch of the party. This grew from 80 members to more than 200 after David McNarry defected to the party in 2012; McNarry was elected as the new leader of the party in Northern Ireland, but Reilly kept the title of chairman.

Under his new party label, Reilly stood in South Down at the 2007 Northern Ireland Assembly election, taking 2.7% of the vote. He stood again in 2011, increasing his first preference vote share to 5.6%, but he still missed out on election. However, he easily held his council seat at the 2011 Northern Ireland local elections, then, following reorganisation of local government, took a seat on the new Newry, Mourne and Down District Council in 2014.

Reilly stood as UKIP's candidate at the 2014 European Parliament election, taking seventh position, with 24,584 first preference votes. He also stood at the 2015 UK general election in South Down, coming in fifth place, with 7.1% of the vote.

Reilly was suspended from UKIP in September 2015 for bringing the party into disrepute. After a suspension of two months, UKIP's National Executive Committee formally expelled Reilly from the party in November 2015.

After briefly sitting as an Independent, Reilly then joined the Traditional Unionist Voice (TUV) that same year, continuing to serve on the council. He unsuccessfully contested South Down for the party at the 2016 Assembly election, polling 2,718 first preference votes (6.62%).

In November 2016, just one year after joining the TUV, he resigned from it. The reason he cited for leaving was having commenced employment with a charity which required him to be politically unaligned. Just three months later, in February 2017, Reilly began publicly supporting the DUP and formally endorsed Jim Wells in the 2017 Northern Ireland Assembly Election.

Reilly was later re-elected to the council as an independent in 2019. In August 2022, he joined the Democratic Unionist Party along with his former UKIP colleague Alan Lewis, a councillor for Slieve Croob DEA.

Reilly was subsequently re-elected at the 2023 Council election and became the longest serving councillor between the two (now-combined) legacy council areas when Dermot Curran (SDLP) retired after 50 years on the local council in 2023, at which point Reilly had served as a councillor for 34 years.

Civic offices
Preceded by Jackie Patterson	Mayor of Newry; 2004–2005	Succeeded by Pat McGinn
