= Newry, Mourne and Down District Council =

Local authority in Northern Ireland

Newry, Mourne and Down District Council Comhairle Ceantair an Iúir, Mhúrn agus an Dúin

Type
- Type: District council of Newry, Mourne and Down

History
- Founded: 1 April 2015
- Preceded by: Down District Council; Newry and Mourne District Council

Leadership
- Chairperson: Glyn Hanna, DUP
- Vice Chairperson: Doire Finn, SDLP

Structure
- Seats: 41
- Graph of the party split among 41 seats.
- Political groups: All parties (41) Sinn Féin (20) SDLP (9) DUP (5) Alliance (4) UUP (1) Independent (2)
- Length of term: 4 years

Elections
- Voting system: Single transferable vote
- Last election: 18 May 2023
- Next election: 6 May 2027

Meeting place
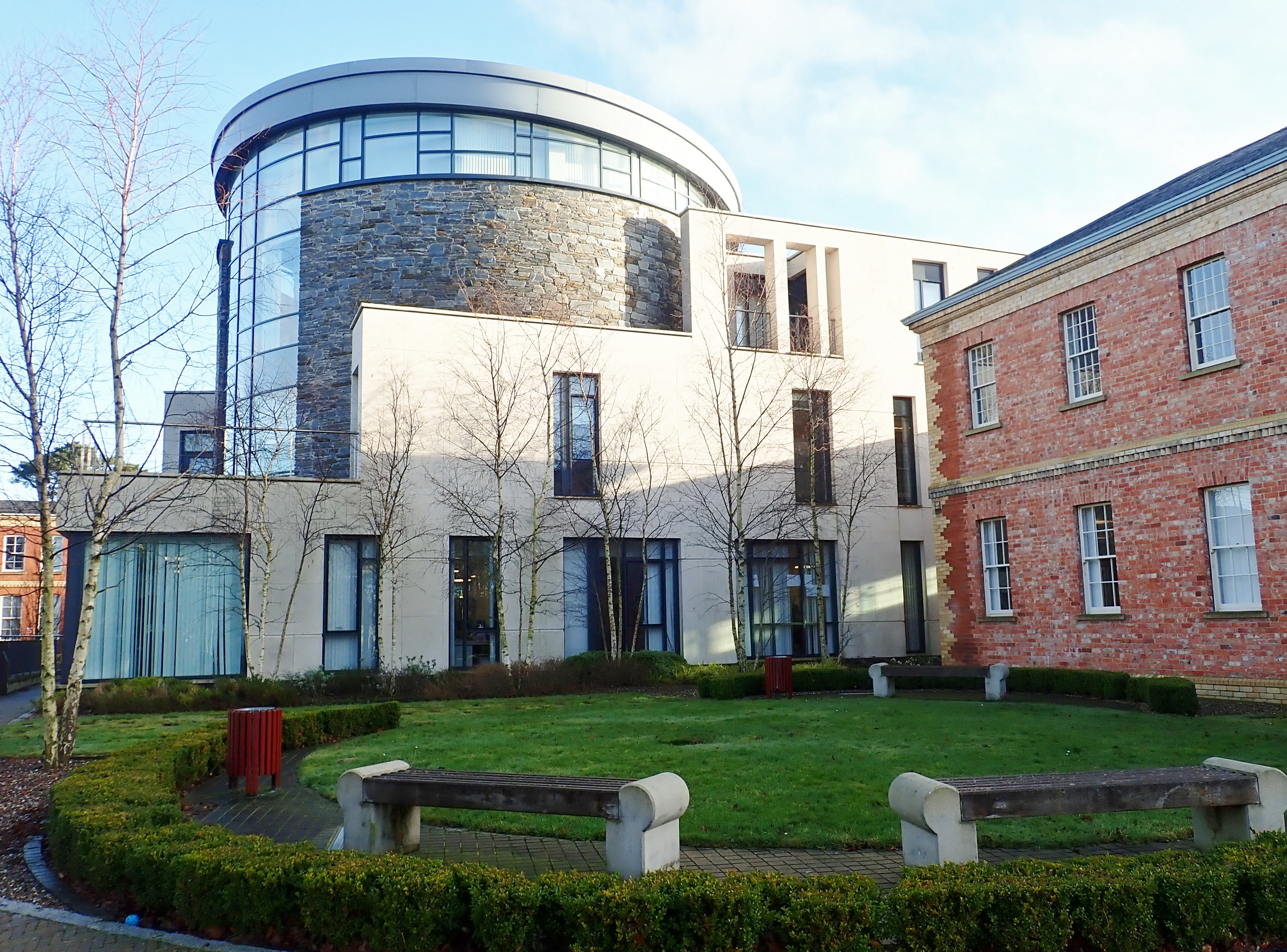
- Downshire Civic Centre, Downpatrick (pictured) and O'Hagan House, Newry

Website
- http://www.newrymournedown.org/

Newry, Mourne and Down District Council (Irish: Comhairle Ceantair an Iúir, Mhúrn agus an Dúin) is a local authority in Northern Ireland that was established on 1 April 2015. It replaces Down District Council and Newry and Mourne District Council and covers most of the southeast of Northern Ireland. The first elections to the authority were on 22 May 2014. At the 2019 Northern Ireland local elections, Sinn Féin became the largest party with 16 seats. This success was continued at the 2023 Northern Ireland local elections, winning 20 seats.

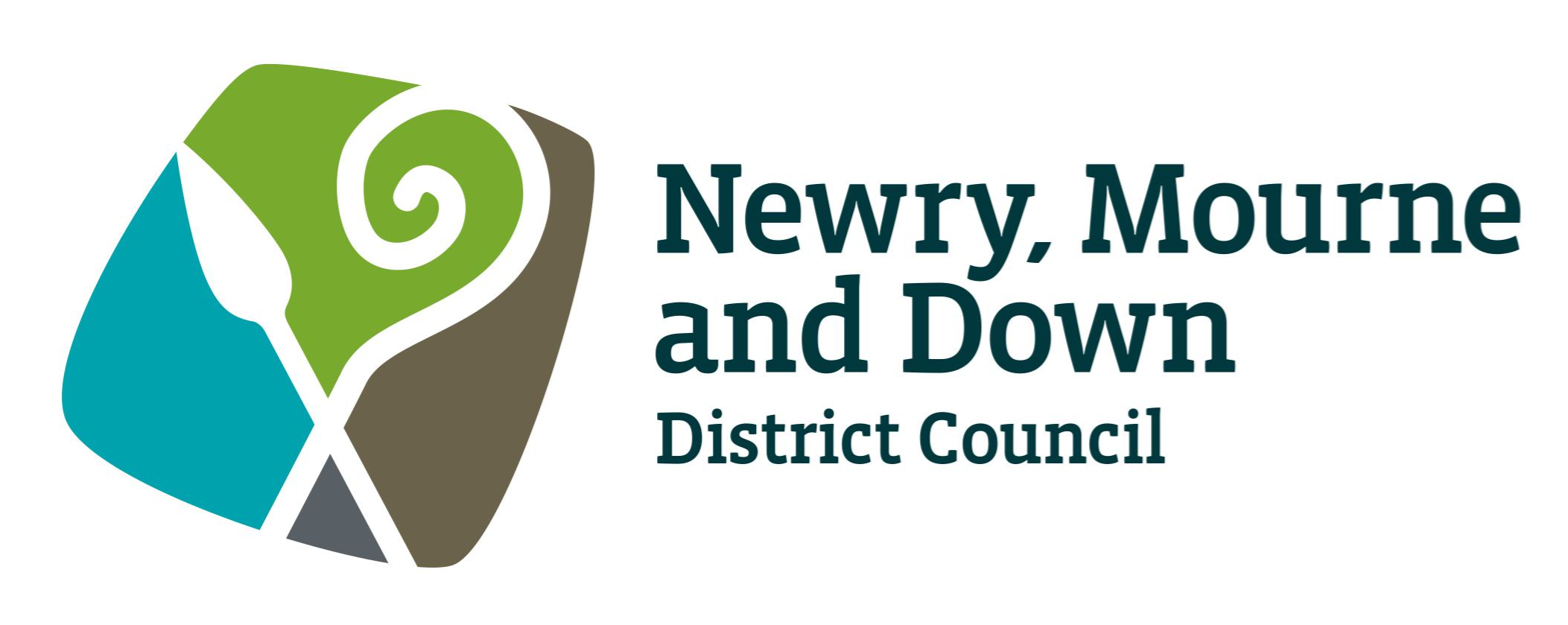
Newry, Mourne and Down District Council (English) logo

== Chairpersonship ==
=== Chairperson ===
From	To	Name	Party
2015	2016	Naomi Bailie	Sinn Féin
2016	2017	Gillian Fitzpatrick	SDLP
2017	2018	Róisín Mulgrew	Sinn Féin
2018	2019	Mark Murnin	SDLP
2019	2020	Charlie Casey	Sinn Féin
2020	2021	Laura Devlin	SDLP
2021	2022	Cathy Mason	Sinn Féin
2022	2023	Michael Savage	SDLP
2023	2024	Valerie Harte	Sinn Féin
2024	2025	Pete Byrne	SDLP
2025	2026	Philip Campbell	Sinn Féin
2026	Present	Glyn Hanna	DUP

=== Deputy Chairperson ===
From	To	Name	Party
2015	2016	Gillian Fitzpatrick	SDLP
2016	2017	Garth Craig	DUP
2017	2018	William Clarke	Sinn Féin
2018	2019	Oksana McMahon	Sinn Féin
2019	2020	Terry Andrews	SDLP
2020	2021	Harold McKee	UUP
2021	2022	Oonagh Magennis	Sinn Féin
2022	2023	Aoife Finnegan	Sinn Féin
2023	2024	Gareth Sharvin	SDLP
2024	2025	David Lee-Surginor	Alliance
2025	2026	Geraldine Kearns	Sinn Féin
2026	Present	Doire Finn	SDLP

== Councillors ==
For the purpose of elections the council is divided into seven district electoral areas (DEA):

Area	Seats
Crotlieve	6
Downpatrick	5
Newry	6
Rowallane	5
Slieve Croob	5
Slieve Gullion	7
The Mournes	7

=== Party strengths ===
Party	Elected 2014	Elected 2019	Elected 2023	Current
Sinn Féin	14	16	20	20
SDLP	14	11	8	8
DUP	4	3	5	5
Alliance	2	2	5	4
UUP	3	4	1	1
UKIP	1	0	0	0
Independents	3	5	2	3

=== Councillors by electoral area ===
Borders of the DEAs within Newry, Mourne and Down

Council members from 2023 election
District electoral area	Name	Party
Crotlieve	Selina Murphy	Sinn Féin
Crotlieve	Declan McAteer	SDLP
Crotlieve	Mark Gibbons	Independent
Crotlieve	Kate Murphy	Sinn Féin
Crotlieve	Mickey Ruane	Sinn Féin
Crotlieve	Jarlath Tinnelly	SDLP
Downpatrick	Oonagh Hanlon	Sinn Féin
Downpatrick	Aurla King †	SDLP
Downpatrick	Cadogan Enright ‡	Independent
Downpatrick	Philip Campbell	Sinn Féin
Downpatrick	Conor Galbraith	SDLP
Newry	Valerie Harte	Sinn Féin
Newry	Cathal King	Sinn Féin
Newry	Geraldine Kearns	Sinn Féin
Newry	Aidan Mathers	Sinn Féin
Newry	Killian Feehan †	SDLP
Newry	Doire Finn	SDLP
Rowallane	Jonny Jackson	DUP
Rowallane	Terry Andrews	SDLP
Rowallane	Callum Bowsie	DUP
Rowallane	Tierna Kelly	Alliance
Rowallane	David Lee-Surginor	Alliance
Slieve Croob	Alan Lewis	DUP
Slieve Croob	Jim Brennan	Sinn Féin
Slieve Croob	Róisín Howell	Sinn Féin
Slieve Croob	Helena Young †	Alliance
Slieve Croob	Siobhan O'Hare	Sinn Féin
Slieve Gullion	Martin Hearty †	Sinn Féin
Slieve Gullion	Mickey Larkin	Sinn Féin
Slieve Gullion	Declan Murphy	Sinn Féin
Slieve Gullion	Pete Byrne	SDLP
Slieve Gullion	Mickey Larkin	Sinn Féin
Slieve Gullion	Oonagh Magennis	Sinn Féin
Slieve Gullion	David Taylor	UUP
The Mournes	Glyn Hanna	DUP
The Mournes	Michael Rice	Sinn Féin
The Mournes	Willie Clarke	Sinn Féin
The Mournes	Niall Lawlor †	Sinn Féin
The Mournes	Laura Devlin	SDLP
The Mournes	Henry Reilly	DUP
The Mournes	Jill Truesdale	Alliance

† Co-opted to replace an elected councillor ‡ Elected as Alliance

=== Councillor Incidents ===
The Mournes DEA DUP Councillor Glyn Hanna is currently the focus of media over the William Walker pervert case.

William Walker, former Chairperson of Down District Council in 2014/2015, and DUP councillor for Rowallane, was in court in June 2023 over the charges. He admitted to sexual offences with underage girls, and Councillor Hanna provided a "positive" character reference for Walker. This has caused an outcry, including from DUP MLAs, including Edwin Poots, former DUP Leader.

== Bilingualism policy ==
Newry, Mourne and Down District Council has a bilingualism policy which sets out the council's commitment to facilitate and encourage the promotion and use of both the Irish language and the English language in the Council area. The implementation of the policy is underpinned by the principle of progressive realisation.

== Premises ==
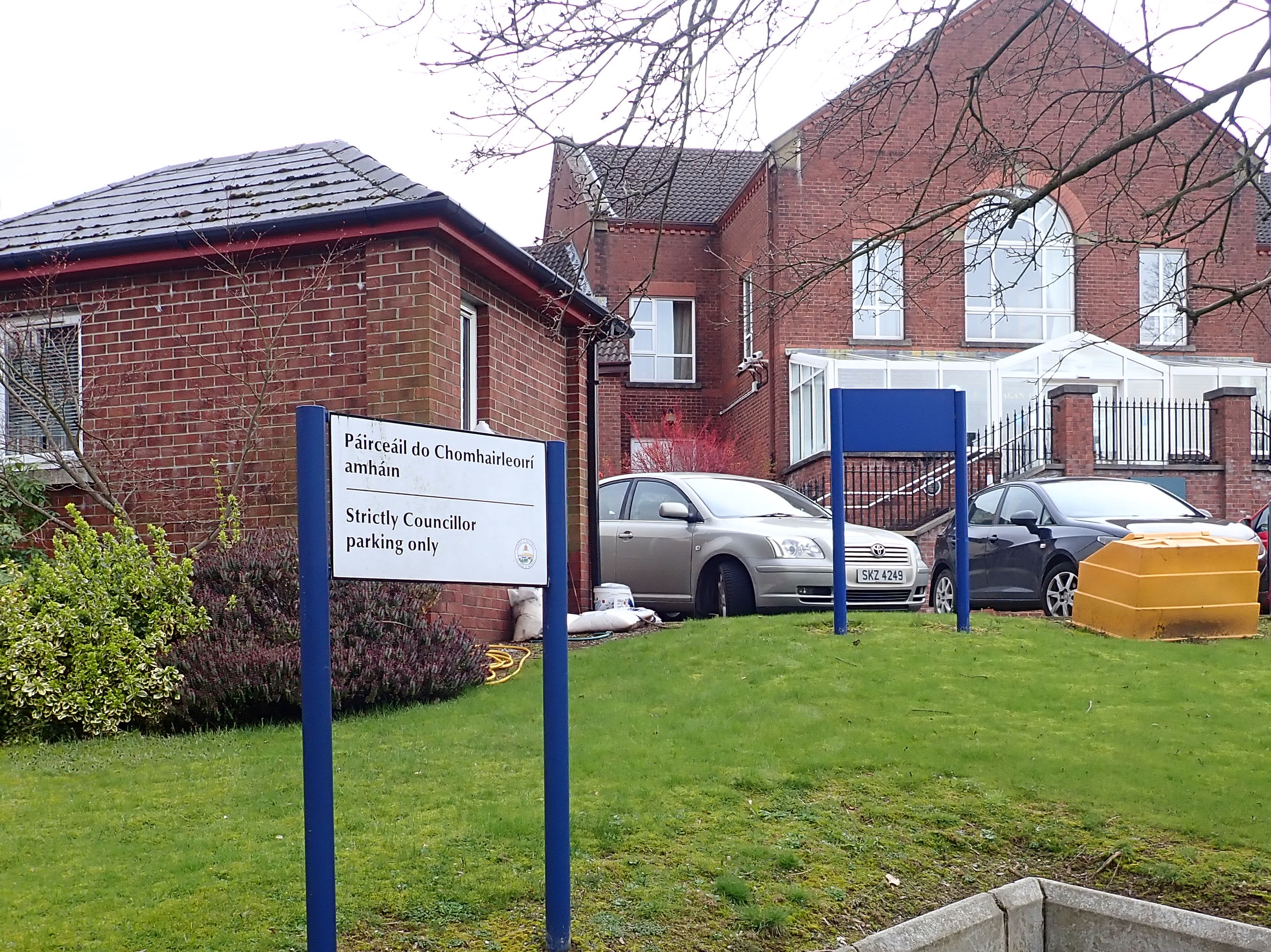
O'Hagan House, Monagahn Row, Newry: One of the council's two main administrative buildings

The council has two main administrative buildings, both inherited from its predecessor authorities. The Downshire Civic Centre comprises part of the Downshire Hospital complex at Downpatrick, which had been converted and extended to become the headquarters of Down District Council in 2012. O'Hagan House on Monaghan Row in Newry was formerly the headquarters of Newry and Mourne District Council. Full council meetings are generally held at Downshire Civic Centre, whilst some committee meetings are held at O'Hagan House.

== Population ==
The area covered by the Council has a population of 171,533 residents according to the 2011 Northern Ireland census.
