= List of districts in Northern Ireland by religion or religion brought up in =

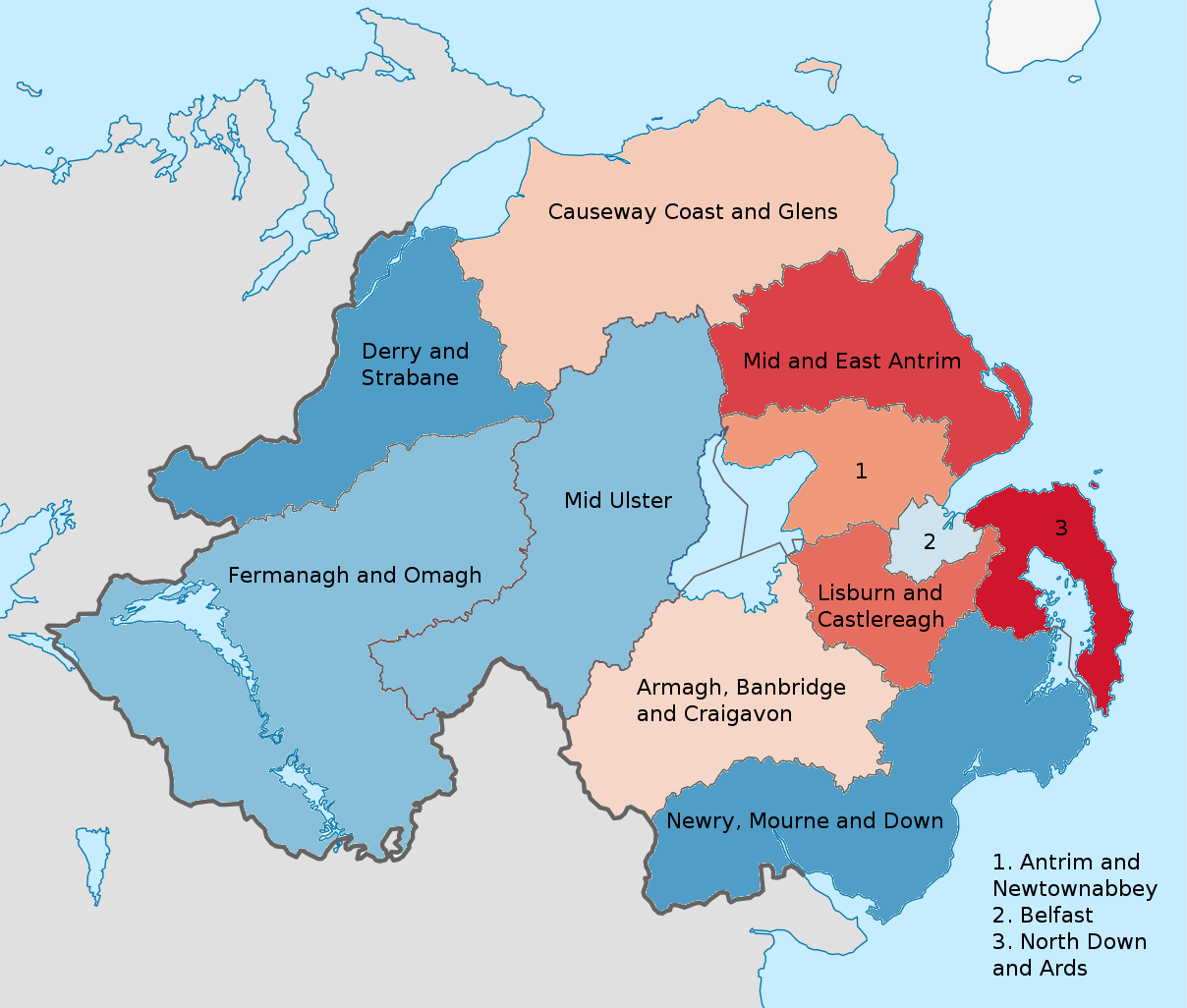
Difference between percentage of Catholics and percentage of Protestants in the current districts at the time of the 2011 census. Weaker colours indicate more mixed districts. Stronger colours indicate greater predominance of either Catholics (blue) or Protestants (red).

This is a list of districts in Northern Ireland by religion or religion brought up in.

In the 2001 decennial census, the Census Office for Northern Ireland (CONI) asked a new question to attempt to achieve a more accurate depiction of the balance of the mainly unionist Protestant and mainly nationalist Catholic communities across Northern Ireland.

As well as asking the traditional question of "Religion?" – to which over 13% of respondents gave no answer – it also asked "Religion brought up in?" to capture those who no longer identify with a religion. The combination of the two questions gave a community background by religion for over 97% of the population. In the 2011 census the same process could only assign a religion to 94% of the population and the Northern Ireland Statistics and Research Agency ceased to call the measure "community background" and instead called it "religion or religion brought up in".

These figures are presented here as an approximation of the community balance, without implying any particular significance to the absolute figures. Not all Protestants are unionists, and not all Catholics are nationalist. For information on recent communal conflicts in Northern Ireland, see the Troubles. The census reports do not distinguish between Protestant and other non-Catholic Christian faiths. The number of Orthodox Christians in Northern Ireland is estimated at 3000 followers.

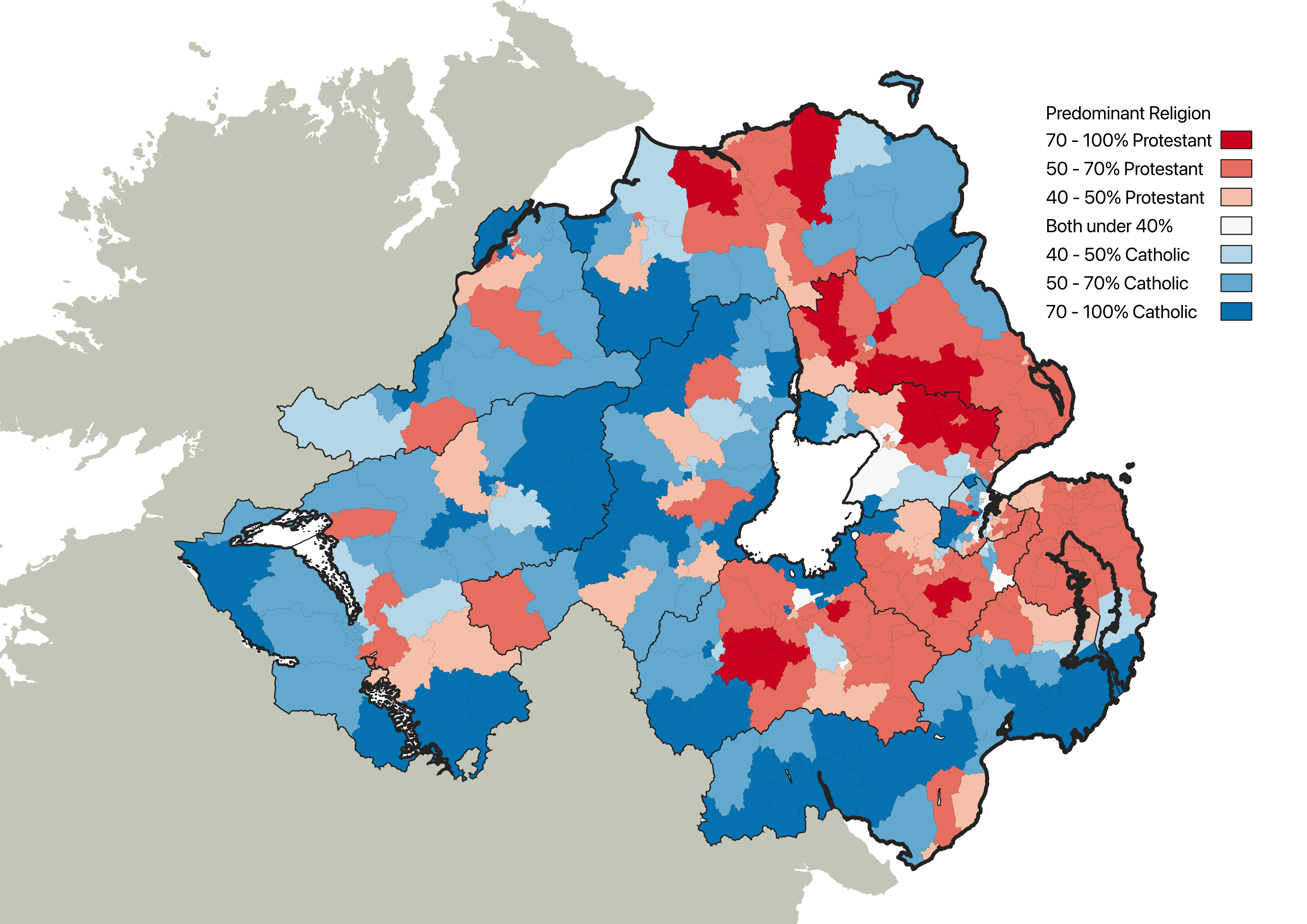
Predominant religion at the ward level from the 2021 census.

These figures based on the 2021 census at district level mask wide variations on smaller scales. For instance, in Belfast, Catholics varied between 4.83% (Shankill ward) and 90.96% (Turf Lodge ward). Protestants varied between 1.49% (Turf Lodge ward) and 80.39% (Shankill ward)

Following the reform of local government in Northern Ireland the twenty-six districts created in 1973 were replaced with eleven "super districts". The first election using these districts took place on 22 May 2014, electing councillors who sat in shadow form until 1 April 2015. The breakdown of religion or religion brought up in within these new boundaries at the time of the 2021 census was as follows.

District	Catholic	Protestant and other Christian	Other
Antrim and Newtownabbey	31.4%	54.7%	12.4%
Armagh, Banbridge and Craigavon	43.8%	46.7%	8.2%
Belfast	48.7%	36.4%	11.6%
Causeway Coast and Glens	40.1%	51.1%	7.9%
Derry and Strabane	72.4%	23.1%	3.5%
Fermanagh and Omagh	64.3%	30.7%	4.1%
Lisburn and Castlereagh	27.2%	58.3%	12.8%
Mid and East Antrim	19.7%	67.3%	12.1%
Mid Ulster	64.7%	30.2%	4.4%
Newry, Mourne and Down	72.1%	22.0%	5.2%
Ards and North Down	13.6%	67.9%	17.1%

== See also ==
- Demographics of Northern Ireland
- List of districts in Northern Ireland by population
- List of districts in Northern Ireland by area
- List of districts in Northern Ireland by national identity
- Local government in Northern Ireland
- Religion in Northern Ireland
