= List of districts in Northern Ireland (pre-2015) =

This is a list of the former local government districts in Northern Ireland showing statistics for population, population density and area. The figures are from the 2011 Census.

These districts officially dissolved on 1 April 2015 when they were merged into eleven larger districts, statistics for which are listed at Local government in Northern Ireland.

Council	Population	Density	Area (km^{2})	Type
Belfast	280,962	2,339	115	City
Lisburn	120,165	247	447	City
Derry	107,877	276	387	City
Newry and Mourne	99,480	100	902	District
Craigavon	93,023	220	378	Borough
Newtownabbey	85,139	532	151	Borough
North Down	79,900	958	81	Borough
Ards	78,937	199	376	Borough
Down	69,731	103	647	District
Castlereagh	67,242	774	85	Borough
Ballymena	64,044	95	632	Borough
Fermanagh	61,805	32	1,876	District
Armagh	59,349	82	671	City and District
Coleraine	59,067	116	486	Borough
Dungannon and South Tyrone	57,852	63	784	Borough
Antrim	53,428	86	577	Borough
Omagh	51,356	44	1,130	District
Banbridge	48,339	97	453	District
Magherafelt	45,038	72	573	District
Strabane	39,384	45	862	District
Carrickfergus	39,114	472	82	Borough
Cookstown	37,013	54	622	District
Limavady	33,536	58	586	Borough
Larne	32,180	92	336	Borough
Ballymoney	31,224	68	418	Borough
Moyle	17,050	34	480	District

== See also ==
- Local government in Northern Ireland
- Local Councils in Northern Ireland by area
- Local Councils in Northern Ireland by population density
- List of districts in Northern Ireland by religion or religion brought up in
- List of districts in Northern Ireland by national identity
