= Local government in Northern Ireland =

System of state administration on a local level in Northern Ireland

Local government in Northern Ireland is divided among 11 single-tier districts known as local government districts (abbreviated LGDs) and formerly known as district council areas (DCAs). Councils in Northern Ireland do not carry out the same range of functions as those in the rest of the United Kingdom; for example they have no responsibility for education, road-building or housing (although they do nominate members to the advisory Northern Ireland Housing Council). Their functions include planning, waste and recycling services, leisure and community services, building control and local economic and cultural development. The collection of rates is handled centrally by the Land and Property Services agency of the Northern Ireland Executive.

== Local government districts (since 2015) ==
Local government districts of Northern Ireland. Each district in this image is numbered, with the numbers corresponding to those in the table below.

The 11 districts first had their boundaries determined in 2012. Elections were held to the new councils in 2014, and they assumed the powers of the previous councils in 2015. Basic geographical statistics are shown below. Previously (between 1972 and 2015) the country was divided into 26 smaller districts.

Local government districts of Northern Ireland
No. on map	District	Council	Type	No. of wards/cllrs	District electoral areas	Land area		Population (2024)	Density		Population of largest settlement (2021)
No. on map	District	Council	Type	No. of wards/cllrs	District electoral areas	(km^{2})	(mi^{2})	Population (2024)	(/km^{2})	(/mi^{2})	Population of largest settlement (2021)
3	Antrim and Newtownabbey	Antrim and Newtownabbey Borough Council	District, borough	40	7: Airport, Antrim, Ballyclare, Dunsilly, Glengormley Urban, Macedon, Three Mile Water	571	220	148,100	259	670	67,112: Metropolitan Newtownabbey
2	Ards and North Down	Ards and North Down Borough Council	District, borough	40	7: Ards Peninsula, Comber, Bangor Central, Bangor East and Donaghadee, Bangor West, Holywood and Clandeboye	458	177	165,415	361	930	64,122: Bangor
6	Armagh City, Banbridge and Craigavon	Armagh City, Banbridge and Craigavon Borough Council	District, city, borough	41	7: Armagh, Banbridge, Craigavon, Cusher, Lagan River, Lurgan, Portadown	1,332	514	222,511	167	430	72,721: Craigavon Urban Area including Aghacommon
1	Belfast	Belfast City Council	District, city (1888)	60	10: Balmoral, Botanic, Black Mountain, Castle, Collin, Court, Lisnasharragh, Oldpark, Ormiston, Titanic	133	51	352,390	2,650	6,900	291,386: Belfast City
8	Causeway Coast and Glens	Causeway Coast and Glens Borough Council	District, borough	40	7: Bann, Ballymoney, Benbradagh, Coleraine, Causeway, Limavady, The Glens	1,980	760	141,954	72	190	24,560: Coleraine
10	Derry City and Strabane	Derry City and Strabane District Council	District, city	40	7: Ballyarnett, Derg, Faughan, Foyleside, Sperrin, The Moor, Waterside	1,237	478	152,383	123	320	84,884: Derry City
11	Fermanagh and Omagh	Fermanagh and Omagh District Council	District	40	7: Enniskillen, Erne East, Erne North, Erne West, Mid Tyrone, Omagh, West Tyrone	2,836	1,095	117,687	41	110	20,353: Omagh Town
4	Lisburn and Castlereagh	Lisburn and Castlereagh City Council	District, city (2002)	40	7: Downshire East, Downshire West, Killultagh, Lisburn North, Lisburn South, Castlereagh East, Castlereagh South	504	195	151,669	301	780	51,447: Lisburn City
7	Mid and East Antrim	Mid and East Antrim Borough Council	District, borough	40	7: Ballymena, Bannside, Braid, Carrick Castle, Coast Road, Knockagh, Larne Lough	1,045	403	139,913	134	350	31,308: Ballymena
9	Mid Ulster	Mid Ulster District Council	District	40	7: Carntogher, Clogher Valley, Cookstown, Dungannon, Magherafelt, Moyola, Torrent	1,823	704	152,718	84	220	16,361: Dungannon
5	Newry, Mourne and Down	Newry, Mourne and Down District Council	District	41	7: Crotlieve, Downpatrick, Newry, Rowallane, Slieve Croob, Slieve Gullion	1,628	629	183,115	112	290	28,026: Newry

== Elections ==
Councillors are elected for a four-year term of office under the single transferable vote (STV) system. Elections were last held on 18 May 2023. To qualify for election, a councillor candidate must be:

- at least 18 years of age, and
- a Commonwealth of Nations or European Union citizen

In addition, they must either:

- be a local elector for the district, or
- have, during the whole of the 12-month period prior to the election, either owned or occupied land in the district, or else resided or worked in the district

The following gallery contains maps of local election results from 1993 onwards, with each District Electoral Area coloured according to the party that won the most first preference votes, and darker colours indicating a majority of first preference votes.

2023

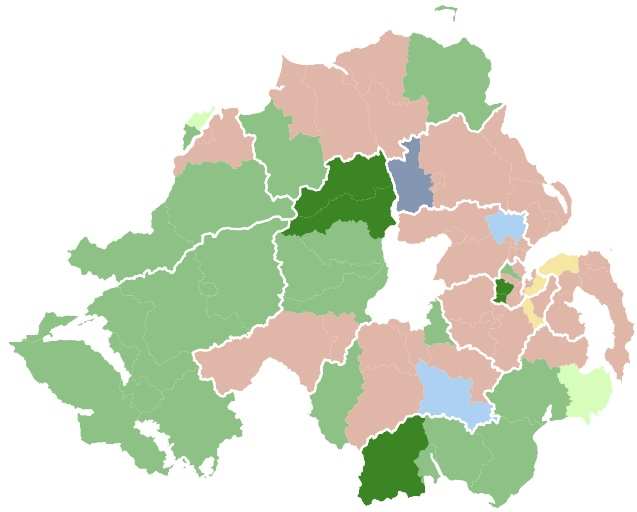
2019

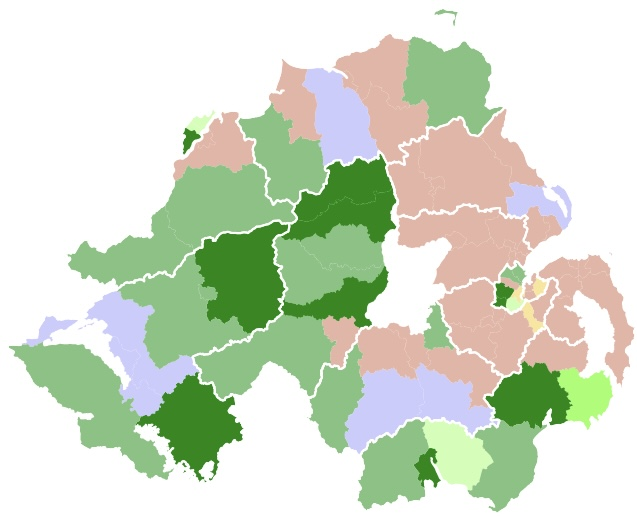
2014

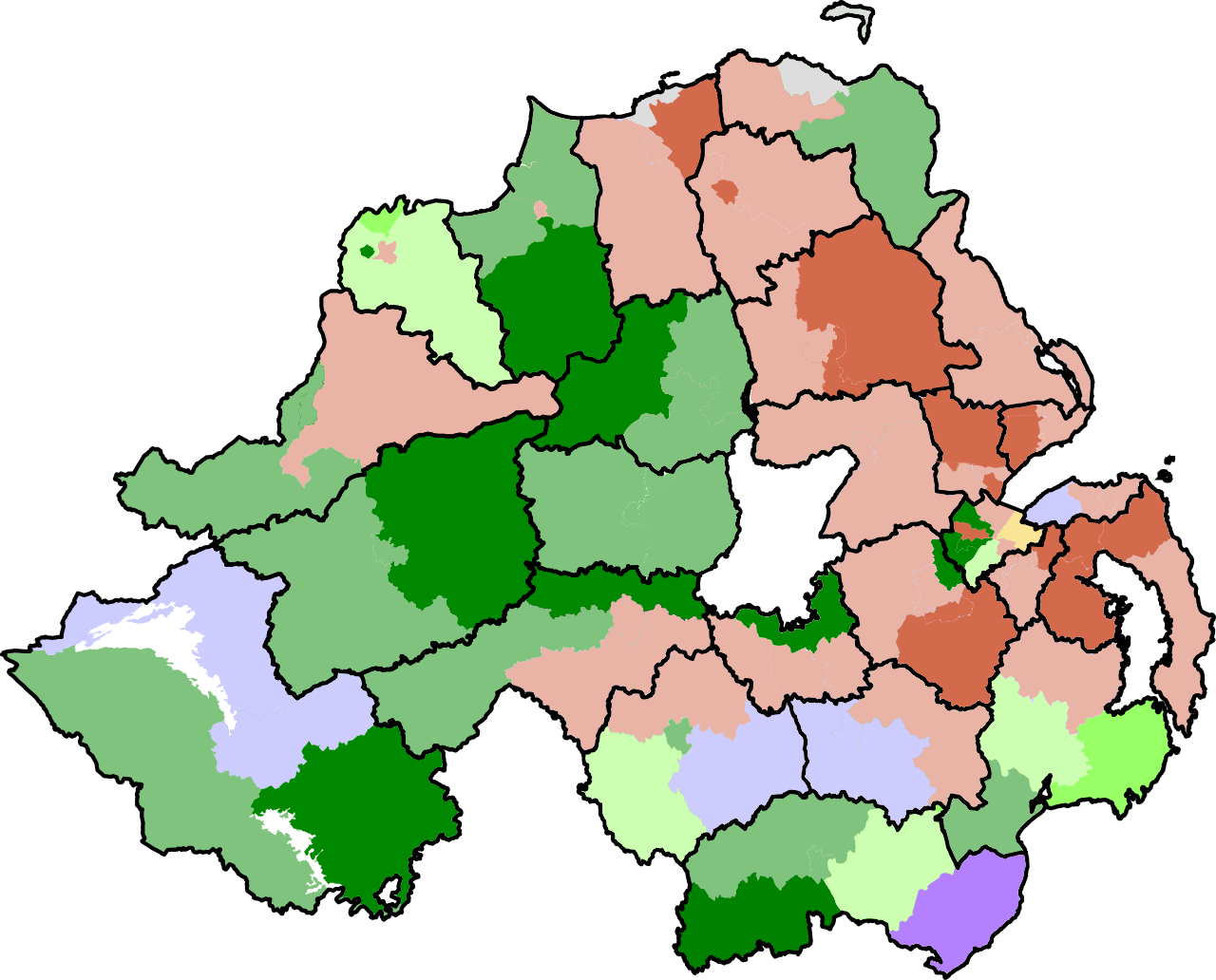
2011

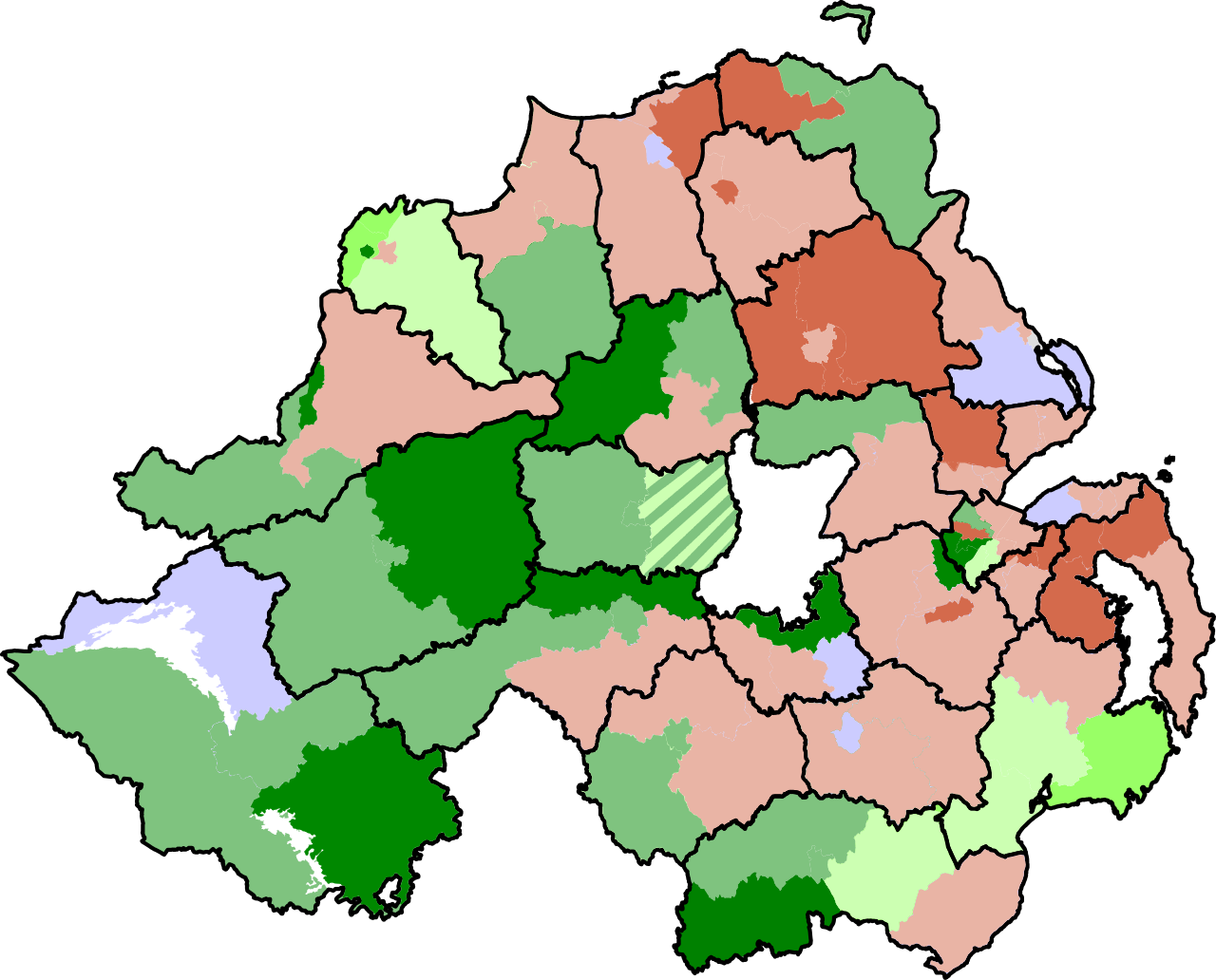
2005

2001

1997

1993

== History ==
The current pattern of 11 local government districts was established on 1 April 2015, as a result of the reform process that started in 2005.

The previous pattern of local government in Northern Ireland, with 26 councils, was established in 1973 by the Local Government (Boundaries) Act (Northern Ireland) 1971 and the Local Government Act (Northern Ireland) 1972 to replace the previous system established by the Local Government (Ireland) Act 1898. The system was based on the recommendations of the Macrory Report, of June 1970, which presupposed the continued existence of the Government of Northern Ireland to act as a regional-level authority.

From 1921 to 1973, Northern Ireland was divided into six administrative counties (subdivided into urban and rural districts) and two county boroughs. The counties and county boroughs continue to exist for the purposes of lieutenancy and shrievalty. This system, with the abolition of rural districts, remains the model for local government in the Republic of Ireland.

In June 2002, the Northern Ireland Executive established a Review of Public Administration to review the arrangements for the accountability, development, administration and delivery of public services. Among its recommendations were a reduction in the number of districts. In 2005 Peter Hain, the Secretary of State for Northern Ireland, announced proposals to reduce the number of councils to seven. The names and boundaries of the seven districts were announced in March 2007. In March 2008 the restored Northern Executive agreed to create eleven new councils instead of the original seven. The first elections were due to take place in May 2011. However, by May 2010 disagreements among parties in the executive over district boundaries were expected to delay the reforms until 2015. In June 2010 the proposed reforms were abandoned following the failure of the Northern Ireland Executive to reach agreement. However, on 12 March 2012, the Northern Ireland Executive published its programme for government, which included a commitment to reduce the number of councils in Northern Ireland to 11.

=== Local government districts (1973 to 2015) ===
The previous set of 26 councils, which preceded the current set of 11 councils, are shown on the below map. They had 583 wards in total – meaning 583 councillors, representing 102 district electoral areas.

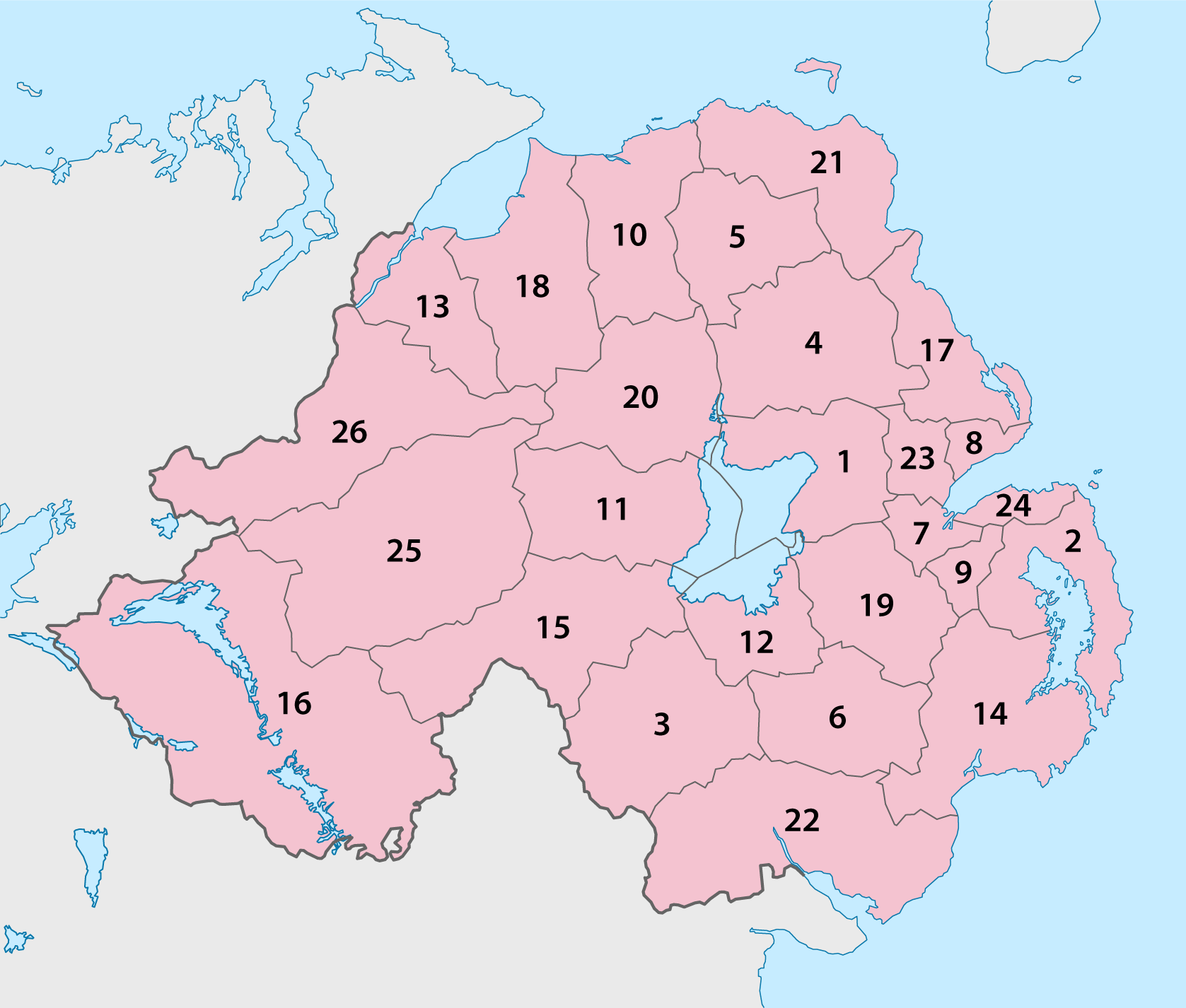

No. on map	Council	Type (2011)	No of wards/cllrs (2011)	DEAs (1993-2011)	Population of largest settlement (2011)	Population (2011)	Density (/km^{2})	Area (km^{2})
7	Belfast City Council	City	51	9 - Balmoral, Castle, Court, Laganbank, Lower Falls, Oldpark, Pottinger, Upper Falls, Victoria	280,138 - Belfast City	280,962	2,339	115
19	Lisburn City Council	City	30	5 - Downshire, Dunmurry Cross, Killultagh, Lisburn Town North, Lisburn Town South	45,370 - Lisburn City	120,165	247	447
13	Derry City Council	City	30	5 - Cityside, Northland, Rural, Shantallow, Waterside	83,163 - Derry City	107,877	276	387
22	Newry and Mourne District Council	District	30	5 - Crotlieve, Newry Town, Slieve Gullion, The Fews, The Mournes	26,967 - Newry	99,480	100	902
12	Craigavon Borough Council	Borough	26	4 - Craigavon Central, Lurgan, Loughside, Portadown	64,323 - Craigavon Urban Area including Aghacommon	93,023	220	378
23	Newtownabbey Borough Council	Borough	25	4 - Antrim Line, Ballyclare, Macedon, University	65,646 - Metropolitan Newtownabbey	85,139	532	151
24	North Down Borough Council	Borough	25	4 - Abbey, Ballyholme and Groomsport, Bangor West, Holywood	61,011 - Bangor	79,900	958	81
2	Ards Borough Council	Borough	23	4 - Ards East, Ards Peninsula, Ards West, Newtownards	28,050 - Newtownards	78,937	199	376
14	Down District Council	District	23	4 - Ballynahinch, Downpatrick, Newcastle, Rowallane	10,822 - Downpatrick	69,731	103	647
9	Castlereagh Borough Council	Borough	23	4 - Castlereagh Central, Castlereagh East, Castlereagh South, Castlereagh West	55,857 - Metropolitan Castlereagh	67,242	774	85
4	Ballymena Borough Council	Borough	24	4 - Ballymena North, Ballymena South, Bannside, Braid	29,551 - Ballymena	64,044	95	632
16	Fermanagh District Council	District	23	4 - Enniskillen, Erne East, Erne North, Erne West	13,823 - Enniskillen	61,805	32	1,876
3	Armagh City and District Council	City and district	22	4 - Armagh City, Crossmore, Cusher, The Orchard	14,777 - Armagh	59,349	82	671
10	Coleraine Borough Council	Borough	22	4 - Bann, Coleraine Central, Coleraine East, The Skerries	24,634 - Coleraine	59,067	116	486
15	Dungannon and South Tyrone Borough Council	Borough	22	4 - Blackwater, Clogher Valley, Dungannon Town, Torrent	14,340 - Dungannon	57,852	63	784
1	Antrim Borough Council	Borough	19	3 - Antrim North West, Antrim South East, Antrim Town	23,375 - Antrim	53,428	86	577
25	Omagh District Council	District	21	3 - Mid Tyrone, Omagh Town, West Tyrone	19,659 - Omagh	51,356	44	1,130
6	Banbridge District Council	District	17	3 - Banbridge Town, Dromore, Knockiveagh	16,637 - Banbridge	48,339	97	453
20	Magherafelt District Council	District	16	3 - Magherafelt, Moyola, Sperrin	8,805 - Magherafelt	45,038	72	573
26	Strabane District Council	District	16	3 - Derg, Glenelly, Mourne	13,172 - Strabane	39,384	45	862
8	Carrickfergus Borough Council	Borough	17	3 - Carrick Castle, Kilroot, Knockagh Monument	27,998 - Carrickfergus	39,114	472	82
11	Cookstown District Council	District	16	3 - Ballinderry, Cookstown Central, Drum Manor	11,599 - Cookstown	37,013	54	622
18	Limavady Borough Council	Borough	15	3 - Bellarena, Benbradagh, Limavady Town	12,032 - Limavady	33,536	58	586
17	Larne Borough Council	Borough	15	3 - Coast Road, Larne Lough, Larne Town	18,755 - Larne	32,180	92	336
5	Ballymoney Borough Council	Borough	16	3 - Ballymoney Town, Bann Valley, Bushvale	10,402 - Ballymoney	31,224	68	418
21	Moyle District Council	District	15	3 - Ballycastle, Giant's Causeway, The Glens	5,237 - Ballycastle	17,050	34	480
Total	26 councils	13 boroughs, 9 districts, 3 cities, 1 city and district	583 wards	102 District Electoral Areas	280,138 - Belfast City	1,812,235	128	14,137

== Combinations of districts ==
The districts are combined for various purposes.

=== ITL level 3 ===
Following Brexit, the UK's Office for National Statistics withdrew from Eurostat, and it has since been using the International Territorial Level classification for UK subdivisions. Between 2021 and 2025, the subdivisions were unchanged from the final NUTS classification, with the "UKxxx" prefix replaced by "TLxxx". In the most recent ITL update, Northern Ireland's Level 3 subdivisions match the 11 Local Government Districts.

ITL code	Name
TLN06	Belfast
TLN07	Armagh City, Banbridge and Craigavon
TLN08	Newry, Mourne and Down
TLN09	Ards and North Down
TLN0A	Derry City and Strabane
TLN0B	Mid Ulster
TLN0C	Causeway Coast and Glens
TLN0D	Antrim and Newtownabbey
TLN0E	Lisburn and Castlereagh
TLN0F	Mid and East Antrim
TLN0G	Fermanagh and Omagh

=== Eurostat NUTS level 3 (up to 2024) ===
In the Eurostat Nomenclature of Territorial Units for Statistics (NUTS), Northern Ireland was divided into five parts at level 3.

ITL code	NUTS code	Name	Area	Population (2021)	% of population
TLN01	UKN01	Belfast		293,298	15.4
TLN02	UKN02	Outer Belfast	Carrickfergus, Castlereagh, Lisburn, Newtownabbey, North Down	411,108	21.6
TLN03	UKN03	East	Antrim, Ards, Ballymena, Banbridge, Craigavon, Down, Larne	467,290	24.6
TLN04	UKN04	North	Ballymoney, Coleraine, Derry, Limavady, Moyle, Strabane	292,502	15.4
TLN05	UKN05	West and South	Armagh, Cookstown, Dungannon, Fermanagh, Magherafelt, Newry and Mourne, Omagh	438,975	23.1

=== Former education and library boards ===
There were five education and library boards (ELBs) in Northern Ireland.

As part of the Review of Public Administration process, the library functions of the ELBs were taken over by a new body, the Northern Ireland Library Authority (branded Libraries NI) in April 2009.

The education and skills functions were centralised into a single Education Authority for Northern Ireland in April 2015.

The boards were as follows:

	Name	Area
1.	Belfast	
2.	North Eastern	Antrim, Ballymena, Ballymoney, Carrickfergus, Coleraine, Larne, Magherafelt, Moyle, Newtownabbey
3.	South Eastern	Ards, Castlereagh, Down, Lisburn and North Down
4.	Southern	Armagh, Banbridge, Cookstown, Craigavon, Dungannon and South Tyrone, Newry and Mourne
5.	Western	Derry, Fermanagh, Limavady, Omagh, Strabane

=== Former health and social services boards ===
There were four health and social services boards which were replaced by a single Health and Social Care Board in April 2009.

The former health and social services boards were as follows:

	Name	Area
1.	Eastern	Ards, Belfast, Castlereagh, Down, Lisburn, North Down
2.	Northern	Antrim, Ballymena, Ballymoney, Carrickfergus, Coleraine, Cookstown, Larne, Magherafelt, Moyle, Newtownabbey
3.	Southern	Armagh, Banbridge, Craigavon, Dungannon and South Tyrone, Newry and Mourne
4.	Western	Derry, Fermanagh, Limavady, Omagh, Strabane

== Subdivisions of districts ==
=== District electoral areas (2012) ===
Each of the 11 councils is divided into 7 district electoral areas (DEAs), with the exception of Belfast, which has 10 DEAs. Each DEA, in turn, is made up of 5, 6 or 7 wards, with the number of councillors for each DEA equal to the number of wards.

There are 80 DEAs in Northern Ireland in total, and the current DEA boundaries were finalised in 2012, and first used in the 2014 election, with the new councils coming into operation in May 2015. Prior to this, the 1993 election was the last time local government boundaries had been redrawn - between 1993 and 2011, there were 102 DEAs across the old 26 councils, with each council having between 3 and 9 DEAs each.

By definition, DEAs nest exactly within the 11 Local Government Districts. However, they do not nest within the parliamentary constituencies - for example, the DEAs of Newry, Slieve Gullion and Cusher all fall entirely within the Newry and Armagh constituency, but the Armagh DEA does not - one of its wards, Blackwatertown, falls within the Fermanagh and South Tyrone constituency instead. This means there is no exact comparison of local government election results with Assembly/Westminster results.

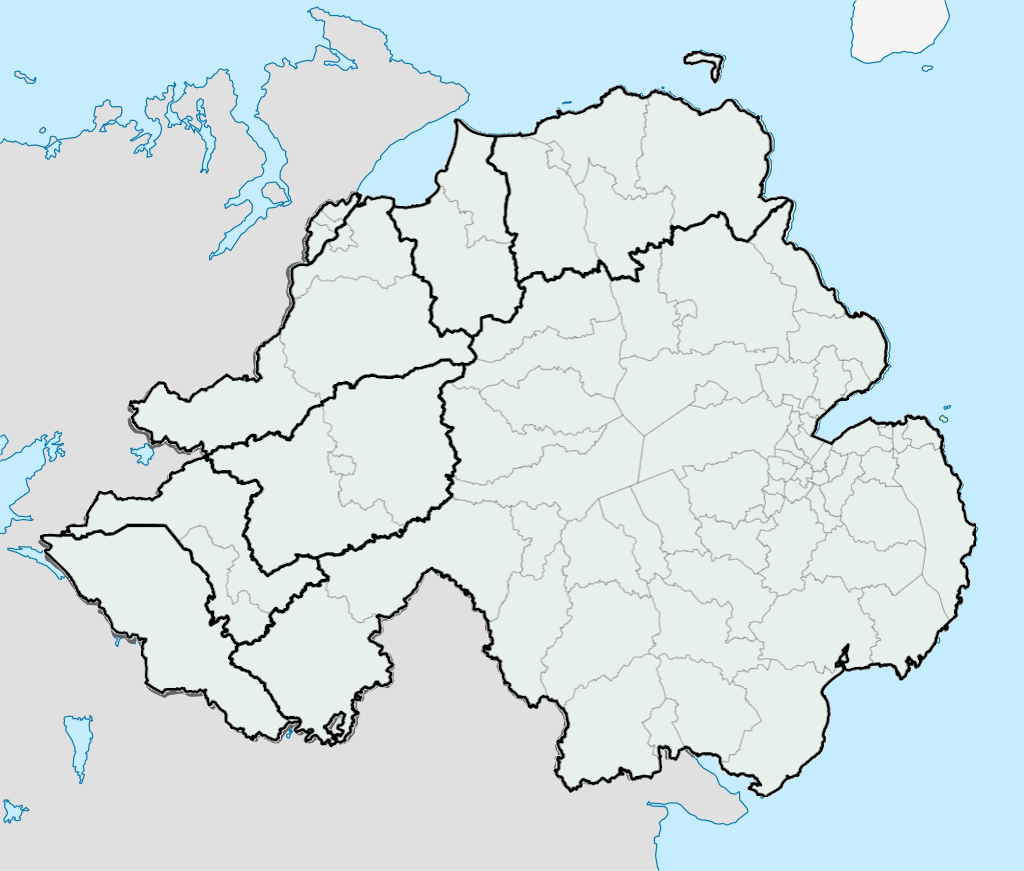
The following combinations of 2012 DEAs each have an area which matches exactly with some combination of 1993 DEAs, allowing direct comparisons of election results in the combined areas from before and after 2012.

However, comparisons are possible between combinations of 2012 DEAs, and combinations of DEAs/LGDs from before 2014. For example, the total election results in the Limavady and Benbradagh DEAs from 2014 can be compared with the results of the whole Limavady borough from 2011, as both cover the same area. Similar comparisons are as follows:

Combinations of 2012 DEAs with exactly the same area as combinations of 1993 DEAs/LGDs
Combination of 2012 DEAs		Combination of 1993 DEAs/LGDs
Ballyarnett, Foyleside and The Moor DEAs	exactly match the area of	Cityside, Northland and Shantallow DEAs
Limavady and Benbradagh DEAs	exactly match the area of	Limavady LGD
Enniskillen and Erne North DEAs	exactly match the area of	Enniskillen and Erne North DEAs
Erne West DEA	exactly matches the area of	Erne West DEA
Derg, Faughan, Sperrin and Waterside DEAs	exactly match the area of	Strabane LGD, Rural and Waterside DEAs
Bann, Ballymoney, Causeway, Coleraine, The Glens DEAs	exactly match the area of	Ballymoney, Coleraine and Moyle LGDs
the remaining DEAs of Northern Ireland	exactly match the area of	the remaining DEAs/LGDs of Northern Ireland

Note that Erne West is the only DEA in Northern Ireland whose boundaries were completely unchanged between 1993 and 2012.

The 80 DEAs are the most granular unit of elected representation, thus providing a more localised indicator of voting preferences than the results in the larger parliamentary constituencies.

Under STV, each DEA is a multi-member district, electing 5, 6 or 7 councillors, with all councillors representing the entire DEA. Wards do not have elected representation in their own right, and no election results at ward level are officially recorded or published, besides turnout levels at individual polling stations.

The below map shows each DEA numbered, with the 2012 local government districts in bold. The inset map shows DEAs in the districts of Antrim and Newtownabbey, Ards and North Down, Belfast, and Lisburn and Castlereagh.

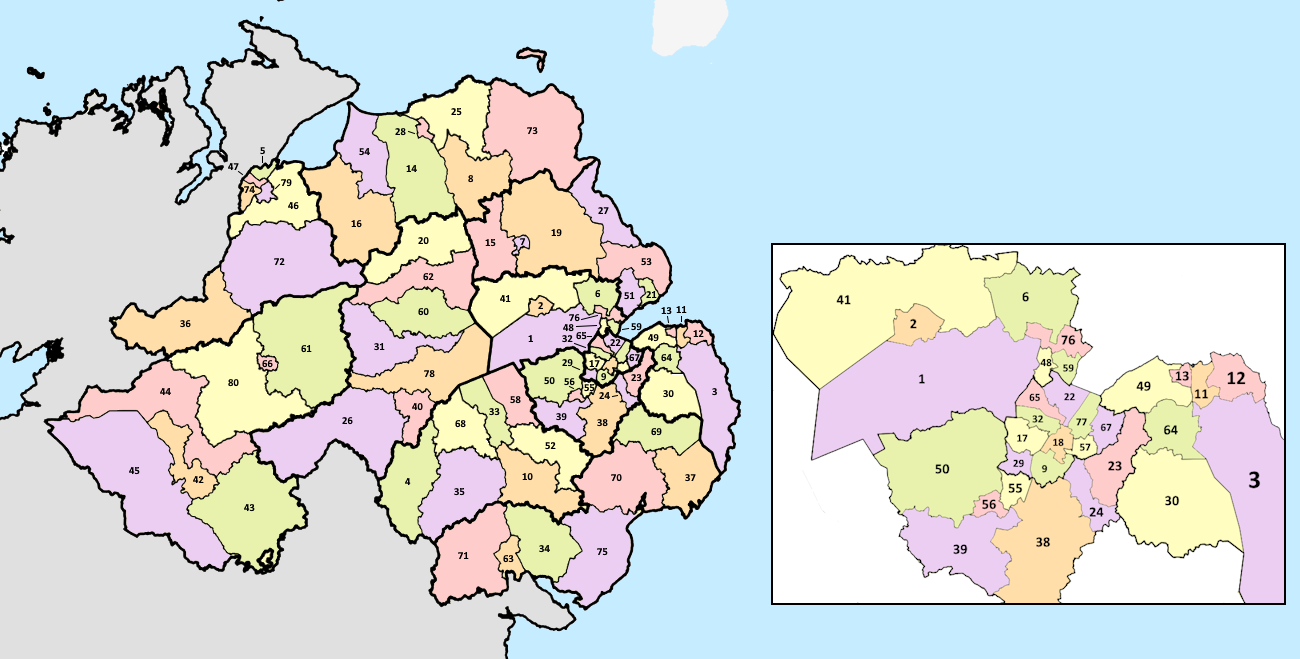

No on map	District electoral area (2012)	Local government district (2012)	No. of wards/cllrs	Wards	Population of largest settlement	DEA population (2021)	Density (/km^{2})	Density (/mi^{2})	Area (km^{2})	Area (mi^{2})
1	Airport	Antrim and Newtownabbey	5	Aldergrove, Clady, Crumlin, Mallusk, Templepatrick	5,340 - Crumlin	22,029	107.06	277.29	205.76	79.44
2	Antrim	Antrim and Newtownabbey	6	Antrim Centre, Fountain Hill, Greystone, Springfarm, Steeple, Stiles	25,464 - Antrim	23,950	1,224.12	3,170.47	19.57	7.55
3	Ards Peninsula	Ards and North Down	6	Ballywalter, Carrowdore, Kircubbin, Loughries, Portaferry, Portavogie	2,553 - Millisle	24,964	118.63	307.26	210.43	81.25
4	Armagh	Armagh City, Banbridge and Craigavon	6	Blackwatertown, Cathedral, Demesne, Keady, Navan, The Mall	16,438 - Armagh	32,405	116.88	302.71	277.26	107.05
5	Ballyarnett	Derry and Strabane	6	Carn Hill, Culmore, Galliagh, Shantallow, Shantallow East, Skeoge	Part of Derry City	25,252	1,303.60	3,376.30	19.37	7.48
6	Ballyclare	Antrim and Newtownabbey	5	Ballyclare East, Ballyclare West, Ballynure, Ballyrobert, Doagh	10,848 - Ballyclare	19,069	244.58	633.45	77.97	30.10
7	Ballymena	Mid and East Antrim	7	Academy, Ardeevin, Ballykeel, Braidwater, Castle Demesne, Fair Green, Park	31,308 - Ballymena	24,295	1,827.30	4,732.68	13.30	5.13
8	Ballymoney	Causeway Coast and Glens	7	Ballymoney East, Ballymoney North, Ballymoney South, Clogh Mills, Dunloy, Rasharkin, Route	10,903 - Ballymoney	24,519	104.47	270.57	234.70	90.62
9	Balmoral	Belfast	5	Belvoir, Finaghy, Malone, Musgrave, Upper Malone	Part of Belfast City and Metropolitan Castlereagh	24,491	1,516.73	3,928.32	16.15	6.23
10	Banbridge	Armagh City, Banbridge and Craigavon	7	Banbridge East, Banbridge North, Banbridge South, Banbridge West, Gilford, Loughbrickland, Rathfriland	17,248 - Banbridge	34,940	151.17	391.53	231.13	89.24
11	Bangor Central	Ards and North Down	6	Ballygrainey, Ballyholme, Bloomfield, Broadway, Castle, Harbour	Part of Bangor	26,637	1,879.50	4,867.88	14.17	5.47
12	Bangor East and Donaghadee	Ards and North Down	6	Ballycrochan, Ballymagee, Donaghadee, Groomsport, Silverbirch, Warren	Part of Bangor	22,850	701.73	1,817.48	32.56	12.57
13	Bangor West	Ards and North Down	5	Bryansburn, Kilcooley, Rathgael, Rathmore, Silverstream	Part of Bangor	19,517	3,485.05	9,026.25	5.60	216
14	Bann	Causeway Coast and Glens	5	Aghadowey, Castlerock, Garvagh, Kilrea, Macosquin	1,676 - Kilrea	17,535	48.53	125.70	361.31	139.50
15	Bannside	Mid and East Antrim	6	Ahoghill, Cullybackey, Galgorm, Grange, Maine, Portglenone	3,529 - Ahoghill	19,842	110.96	287.39	178.82	69.04
16	Benbradagh	Causeway Coast and Glens	5	Altahullion, Ballykelly, Dungiven, Feeny, Greysteel	3,346 - Dungiven	17,818	45.41	117.61	392.40	151.50
17	Black Mountain	Belfast	7	Andersonstown, Ballymurphy, Beechmount, Collin Glen, Falls Park, Shaw's Road, Turf Lodge	Part of Belfast City	35,880	1,935.76	5,013.58	18.54	7.16
18	Botanic	Belfast	5	Blackstaff, Central, Ormeau, Stranmillis, Windsor	Part of Belfast City	49,727	4,653.21	12,051.76	10.69	4.13
19	Braid	Mid and East Antrim	7	Ballee and Harryville, Broughshane, Glenravel, Glenwhirry, Kells, Kirkinriola, Slemish	Part of Ballymena	23,826	49.32	127.74	483.07	186.51
20	Carntogher	Mid Ulster	5	Lower Glenshane, Maghera, Swatragh, Tamlaght O'Crilly, Valley	4,222 - Maghera	17,167	65.61	169.94	261.64	101.02
21	Carrick Castle	Mid and East Antrim	5	Boneybefore, Castle, Kilroot, Love Lane, Victoria	Part of Carrickfergus	18,430	759.56	1,967.26	24.26	9.37
22	Castle	Belfast	6	Bellevue, Cavehill, Chichester Park, Duncairn, Fortwilliam, Innisfayle	Part of Belfast City	33,677	1,739.48	4,505.23	19.36	7.48
23	Castlereagh East	Lisburn and Castlereagh	6	Ballyhanwood, Carrowreagh, Dundonald, Enler, Graham's Bridge, Moneyreagh	Dundonald (part of Metropolitan Castlereagh)	21,899	460.07	1,191.57	47.60	18.38
24	Castlereagh South	Lisburn and Castlereagh	7	Beechill, Cairnshill, Carryduff East, Carryduff West, Galwally, Knockbracken, Newtownbreda	Newtownbreda (part of Metropolitan Castlereagh)	23,488	905.99	2,346.52	25.93	10.01
25	Causeway	Causeway Coast and Glens	7	Atlantic, Dervock, Dundooan, Giant's Causeway, Hopefield, Portrush and Dunluce, Portstewart	7,698 - Portstewart	24,542	95.15	246.43	257.93	99.59
26	Clogher Valley	Mid Ulster	6	Augher and Clogher, Aughnacloy, Ballygawley, Caledon, Castlecaulfield, Fivemiletown	1,341 - Fivemiletown	21,997	40.38	104.58	544.76	210.33
27	Coast Road	Mid and East Antrim	5	Cairncastle, Carnlough and Glenarm, Craigyhill, Gardenmore, The Maidens	Part of Larne	17,005	115.19	298.33	147.63	57.00
28	Coleraine	Causeway Coast and Glens	6	Churchland, Mountsandel, Quarry, University, Waterside, Windy Hall	24,560 - Coleraine	23,625	1,675.66	4,339.95	14.10	5.44
29	Collin	Belfast	6	Dunmurry, Ladybrook, Lagmore, Poleglass, Stewartstown, Twinbrook	Part of Metropolitan Lisburn and Belfast City	33,909	3,198.18	8,283.24	10.60	4.09
30	Comber	Ards and North Down	5	Ballygowan, Comber North, Comber South, Comber West, Killinchy	9,512 - Comber	19,487	176.04	455.94	110.70	42.74
31	Cookstown	Mid Ulster	7	Coagh, Cookstown East, Cookstown South, Cookstown West, Loughry, Oaklands, Pomeroy	12,549 - Cookstown	24,617	92.06	238.43	267.41	103.25
32	Court	Belfast	6	Ballygomartin, Clonard, Falls, Forth River, Shankill, Woodvale	Part of Belfast City	33,475	3,063.12	7,933.44	10.93	4.22
33	Craigavon	Armagh City, Banbridge and Craigavon	5	Bleary, Brownlow, Craigavon Centre, Derrytrasna, Kernan	Craigavon (part of Craigavon Urban Area)	29,188	404.67	1,048.09	72.13	27.85
34	Crotlieve	Newry, Mourne and Down	6	Burren, Derryleckagh, Hilltown, Mayobridge, Rostrevor, Warrenpoint	8,821 - Warrenpoint	28,668	117.58	304.53	243.82	94.14
35	Cusher	Armagh City, Banbridge and Craigavon	5	Hamiltonsbawn, Markethill, Richhill, Seagahan, Tandragee	3,543 - Tandragee	26,195	80.50	208.48	325.42	125.65
36	Derg	Derry and Strabane	5	Castlederg, Finn, Glenderg, Newtownstewart, Sion Mills	2,963 - Castlederg	17,809	45.79	118.58	388.96	150.18
37	Downpatrick	Newry, Mourne and Down	5	Cathedral, Knocknashinna, Lecale, Quoile, Strangford	11,541 - Downpatrick	21,916	119.99	310.78	182.64	70.52
38	Downshire East	Lisburn and Castlereagh	5	Ballymacbrennan, Dromara, Drumbo, Hillhall, Ravernet	Part of Lisburn City	16,746	111.01	287.52	150.85	58.24
39	Downshire West	Lisburn and Castlereagh	5	Blaris, Hillsborough, Lagan, Maze, Moira	4,879 - Moira	17,190	174.66	452.36	98.42	38.00
40	Dungannon	Mid Ulster	6	Ballysaggart, Killyman, Killymeal, Moy, Moygashel, Mullaghmore	16,361 - Dungannon	25,640	272.47	705.71	94.10	36.33
41	Dunsilly	Antrim and Newtownabbey	5	Cranfield, Parkgate, Randalstown, Shilvodan, Toome	5,156 - Randalstown	17,997	77.79	201.46	231.37	89.33
42	Enniskillen	Fermanagh and Omagh	6	Castlecoole, Erne, Lisbellaw, Lisnarrick, Portora, Rossorry	14,120 - Enniskillen	18,451	144.43	374.08	127.75	49.32
43	Erne East	Fermanagh and Omagh	6	Brookeborough, Donagh, Lisnaskea, Maguiresbridge, Newtownbutler, Rosslea	3,006 - Lisnaskea	15,944	32.46	84.07	491.21	189.66
44	Erne North	Fermanagh and Omagh	5	Ballinamallard, Belleek and Boa, Ederney and Kesh, Irvinestown, Tempo	2,320 - Irvinestown	15,083	38.82	100.56	388.49	150.00
45	Erne West	Fermanagh and Omagh	5	Belcoo and Garrison, Boho, Cleenish and Letterbreen, Derrygonnelly, Derrylin, Florence Court and Kinawley	714 - Bellanaleck	14,661	20.20	52.33	725.63	280.17
46	Faughan	Derry and Strabane	5	Claudy, Eglinton, Enagh, New Buildings, Slievekirk	3,550 - Eglinton	19,234	87.99	227.90	218.59	84.40
47	Foyleside	Derry and Strabane	5	Ballymagroarty, Foyle Springs, Madam's Bank, Northland, Springtown	Part of Derry City	17,568	1,562.52	4,046.90	11.24	4.34
48	Glengormley Urban	Antrim and Newtownabbey	7	Ballyhenry, Burnthill, Carnmoney, Collinbridge, Glebe, Glengormley, Hightown	Part of Metropolitan Newtownabbey	21,639	2,345.03	6,073.60	9.23	3.56
49	Holywood and Clandeboye	Ards and North Down	5	Clandeboye, Cultra, Helen's Bay, Holywood, Loughview	10,735 - Holywood	20,809	414.04	1,072.36	50.26	19.40
50	Killultagh	Lisburn and Castlereagh	5	Ballinderry, Glenavy, Maghaberry, Stonyford, White Mountain	2,943 - Maghaberry	22,013	136.53	353.60	161.23	62.25
51	Knockagh	Mid and East Antrim	5	Burleigh Hill, Gortalee, Greenisland, Sunnylands, Woodburn	Part of Carrickfergus	17,272	295.29	764.79	58.49	22.58
52	Lagan River	Armagh City, Banbridge and Craigavon	5	Donaghcloney, Dromore, Gransha, Quilly, Waringstown	6,492 - Dromore	24,804	132.65	343.57	186.99	72.20
53	Larne Lough	Mid and East Antrim	5	Ballycarry and Glynn, Curran and Inver, Islandmagee, Kilwaughter, Whitehead South	Part of Larne	18,324	127.91	331.29	143.25	55.31
54	Limavady	Causeway Coast and Glens	5	Coolessan, Drumsurn, Greystone, Magilligan, Roeside	11,697 - Limavady	16,230	83.85	217.17	193.56	74.74
55	Lisburn North	Lisburn and Castlereagh	6	Derryaghy, Harmony Hill, Hilden, Lambeg, Magheralave, Wallace Park	Part of Lisburn City	23,449	1,698.38	4,398.78	13.81	5.33
56	Lisburn South	Lisburn and Castlereagh	6	Ballymacash, Ballymacoss, Knockmore, Lagan Valley, Lisnagarvey, Old Warren	Part of Lisburn City	24,321	2,579.98	6,682.13	9.43	3.64
57	Lisnasharragh	Belfast	6	Cregagh, Hillfoot, Merok, Orangefield, Ravenhill, Rosetta	Part of Belfast City and Metropolitan Castlereagh	29,170	3,521.93	9,121.75	8.28	3.20
58	Lurgan	Armagh City, Banbridge and Craigavon	7	Aghagallon, Knocknashane, Lough Road, Magheralin, Mourneview, Parklake, Shankill	Lurgan (part of Craigavon Urban Area)	38,198	514.86	1,333.48	74.19	28.65
59	Macedon	Antrim and Newtownabbey	6	Abbey, Carnmoney Hill, O'Neill, Rathcoole, Valley, Whitehouse	Part of Metropolitan Newtownabbey	20,323	2,022.19	5,237.45	10.05	3.88
60	Magherafelt	Mid Ulster	5	Coolshinny, Glebe, Lissan, The Loup, Town Parks East	9,647 - Magherafelt	19,266	93.29	241.62	206.52	79.74
61	Mid Tyrone	Fermanagh and Omagh	6	Beragh, Drumnakilly, Gortin, Owenkillew, Sixmilecross, Termon	694 - Beragh	17,590	30.92	80.08	568.88	219.65
62	Moyola	Mid Ulster	5	Ballymaguigan, Bellaghy, Castledawson, Draperstown, Tobermore	2,345 - Castledawson	18,586	78.46	203.21	236.89	91.46
63	Newry	Newry, Mourne and Down	6	Abbey, Ballybot, Damolly, Drumalane, Fathom, St. Patrick's	28,026 - Newry	27,913	535.08	1,385.86	52.17	20.14
64	Newtownards	Ards and North Down	7	Conway Square, Cronstown, Glen, Gregstown, Movilla, Scrabo, West Winds	29,591 - Newtownards	29,395	816.91	2,115.78	35.98	13.89
65	Oldpark	Belfast	6	Ardoyne, Ballysillan, Cliftonville, Legoniel, New Lodge, Water Works	Part of Belfast City	34,352	2,567.84	6,650.67	13.38	5.17
66	Omagh	Fermanagh and Omagh	6	Camowen, Coolnagard, Dergmoney, Gortrush, Killyclogher, Strule	20,353 - Omagh Town	18,480	1,123.21	2,909.11	16.45	6.35
67	Ormiston	Belfast	7	Belmont, Garnerville, Gilnahirk, Knock, Sandown, Shandon, Stormont	Part of Belfast City and Metropolitan Castlereagh	34,615	2,120.58	5,492.26	16.32	6.30
68	Portadown	Armagh City, Banbridge and Craigavon	6	Ballybay, Corcrain, Killycomain, Loughgall, Mahon, The Birches	Portadown (part of Craigavon Urban Area)	32,926	192.69	499.07	170.87	65.97
69	Rowallane	Newry, Mourne and Down	5	Ballynahinch, Crossgar and Killyleagh, Derryboy, Kilmore, Saintfield	6,335 - Ballynahinch	21,240	137.05	354.96	154.98	59.84
70	Slieve Croob	Newry, Mourne and Down	5	Ballydugan, Ballyward, Castlewellan, Drumaness, Dundrum	2,822 - Castlewellan	21,387	69.33	179.56	308.49	119.11
71	Slieve Gullion	Newry, Mourne and Down	7	Bessbrook, Camlough, Crossmaglen, Forkhill, Mullaghbane, Newtownhamilton, Whitecross	3,004 - Bessbrook	30,744	86.21	223.28	356.62	137.69
72	Sperrin	Derry and Strabane	7	Artigarvan, Ballycolman, Dunnamanagh, Glenelly Valley, Park, Strabane North, Strabane West	13,456 - Strabane	24,720	43.38	112.35	569.88	220.03
73	The Glens	Causeway Coast and Glens	5	Ballycastle, Kinbane, Loughguile and Stranocum, Lurigethan, Torr Head and Rathlin	5,628 - Ballycastle	17,477	32.98	85.43	529.85	204.58
74	The Moor	Derry and Strabane	5	Brandywell, City Walls, Creggan, Creggan South, Sheriff's Mountain	Part of Derry City	17,128	682.41	1,767.43	25.10	9.69
75	The Mournes	Newry, Mourne and Down	7	Annalong, Binnian, Donard, Kilkeel, Lisnacree, Murlough, Tollymore	8,293 - Newcastle	30,203	88.92	230.30	339.67	131.15
76	Three Mile Water	Antrim and Newtownabbey	6	Ballyduff, Fairview, Jordanstown, Monkstown, Mossley, Rostulla	Part of Metropolitan Newtownabbey	20,653	1,098.74	2,845.72	18.80	7.26
77	Titanic	Belfast	6	Ballymacarrett, Beersbridge, Bloomfield, Connswater, Sydenham, Woodstock	Part of Belfast City	36,122	2,684.05	6,951.67	13.46	5.20
78	Torrent	Mid Ulster	6	Ardboe, Coalisland North, Coalisland South, Donaghmore, Stewartstown, Washing Bay	6,323 - Coalisland	23,020	105.57	273.43	218.05	84.19
79	Waterside	Derry and Strabane	7	Caw, Clondermot, Drumahoe, Ebrington, Kilfennan, Lisnagelvin, Victoria	Part of Derry City	29,045	1,835.16	4,753.03	15.83	6.11
80	West Tyrone	Fermanagh and Omagh	6	Dromore, Drumquin, Fairy Water, Fintona, Newtownsaville, Trillick	1,212 - Fintona	16,603	30.46	78.89	545.09	210.46

=== Electoral wards (2012) ===
Electoral wards are the basic unit of Northern Ireland's political geography. Since at least 1973, every local government boundary commission has involved the drawing of ward boundaries, then the grouping of wards into DEAs, such that a DEA has one councillor for each ward it has. Likewise, parliamentary constituencies (and thus, Assembly constituencies) are always made up of combinations of electoral wards.

Electoral wards are also used in allocating funding, such as for urban regeneration programmes under the Neighbourhood Renewal Strategy.

Electoral Ward (2012)	District Electoral Area (2012)	Local Government District (2012)	Electoral Ward population (2021)	Density (/km^{2})	Area (km^{2})
Abbey	Macedon	Antrim and Newtownabbey	3,355	3,686.09	0.91
Aldergrove	Airport	Antrim and Newtownabbey	4,684	30.00	156.14
Antrim Centre	Antrim	Antrim and Newtownabbey	4,093	385.31	10.62
Ballyclare East	Ballyclare	Antrim and Newtownabbey	4,142	2,265.19	1.83
Ballyclare West	Ballyclare	Antrim and Newtownabbey	4,044	2,269.64	1.78
Ballyduff	Three Mile Water	Antrim and Newtownabbey	3,020	2,896.67	1.04
Ballyhenry	Glengormley Urban	Antrim and Newtownabbey	2,711	3,150.12	0.86
Ballynure	Ballyclare	Antrim and Newtownabbey	3,610	83.57	43.19
Ballyrobert	Ballyclare	Antrim and Newtownabbey	3,810	230.10	16.56
Burnthill	Glengormley Urban	Antrim and Newtownabbey	3,715	3,876.13	0.96
Carnmoney	Glengormley Urban	Antrim and Newtownabbey	2,607	4,264.56	0.61
Carnmoney Hill	Macedon	Antrim and Newtownabbey	3,305	953.94	3.46
Clady	Airport	Antrim and Newtownabbey	3,834	53.66	71.45
Collinbridge	Glengormley Urban	Antrim and Newtownabbey	2,927	675.90	4.33
Cranfield	Dunsilly	Antrim and Newtownabbey	3,175	54.65	58.10
Crumlin	Airport	Antrim and Newtownabbey	3,705	284.24	13.03
Doagh	Ballyclare	Antrim and Newtownabbey	3,471	237.67	14.60
Fairview	Three Mile Water	Antrim and Newtownabbey	3,115	5,610.43	0.56
Fountain Hill	Antrim	Antrim and Newtownabbey	3,465	1,975.96	1.75
Glebe	Glengormley Urban	Antrim and Newtownabbey	3,042	3,848.21	0.79
Glengormley	Glengormley Urban	Antrim and Newtownabbey	3,421	4,384.84	0.78
Greystone	Antrim	Antrim and Newtownabbey	3,072	3,340.97	0.92
Hightown	Glengormley Urban	Antrim and Newtownabbey	3,126	3,488.68	0.90
Jordanstown	Three Mile Water	Antrim and Newtownabbey	3,244	525.30	6.18
Mallusk	Airport	Antrim and Newtownabbey	6,279	368.51	17.04
Monkstown	Three Mile Water	Antrim and Newtownabbey	3,726	2,491.86	1.50
Mossley	Three Mile Water	Antrim and Newtownabbey	3,708	528.96	7.01
O'Neill	Macedon	Antrim and Newtownabbey	3,328	3,668.94	0.91
Parkgate	Dunsilly	Antrim and Newtownabbey	3,259	41.99	77.61
Randalstown	Dunsilly	Antrim and Newtownabbey	3,734	222.46	16.78
Rathcoole	Macedon	Antrim and Newtownabbey	3,377	5,111.92	0.66
Rostulla	Three Mile Water	Antrim and Newtownabbey	3,921	1,557.07	2.52
Shilvodan	Dunsilly	Antrim and Newtownabbey	3,896	68.49	56.89
Springfarm	Antrim	Antrim and Newtownabbey	5,543	1,190.90	4.65
Steeple	Antrim	Antrim and Newtownabbey	3,794	3,795.24	1.00
Stiles	Antrim	Antrim and Newtownabbey	3,987	875.24	4.56
Templepatrick	Airport	Antrim and Newtownabbey	3,521	97.49	36.12
Toome	Dunsilly	Antrim and Newtownabbey	3,936	46.21	85.18
Valley	Macedon	Antrim and Newtownabbey	3,717	1,491.86	2.49
Whitehouse	Macedon	Antrim and Newtownabbey	3,221	1,993.02	1.62
Aghagallon	Lurgan	Armagh City, Banbridge and Craigavon	5,047	48.62	103.80
Ballybay	Portadown	Armagh City, Banbridge and Craigavon	5,458	702.14	7.77
Banbridge East	Banbridge	Armagh City, Banbridge and Craigavon	4,479	124.12	36.08
Banbridge North	Banbridge	Armagh City, Banbridge and Craigavon	4,272	745.19	5.73
Banbridge South	Banbridge	Armagh City, Banbridge and Craigavon	5,043	2,131.86	2.37
Banbridge West	Banbridge	Armagh City, Banbridge and Craigavon	5,431	2,461.35	2.21
Blackwatertown	Armagh	Armagh City, Banbridge and Craigavon	5,502	60.64	90.73
Bleary	Craigavon	Armagh City, Banbridge and Craigavon	4,981	343.07	14.52
Brownlow	Craigavon	Armagh City, Banbridge and Craigavon	6,626	1,705.25	3.89
Cathedral	Armagh	Armagh City, Banbridge and Craigavon	5,119	1,123.53	4.56
Corcrain	Portadown	Armagh City, Banbridge and Craigavon	5,455	3,394.36	1.61
Craigavon Centre	Craigavon	Armagh City, Banbridge and Craigavon	6,750	565.28	11.94
Demesne	Armagh	Armagh City, Banbridge and Craigavon	5,705	1,204.74	4.74
Derrytrasna	Craigavon	Armagh City, Banbridge and Craigavon	4,981	70.37	70.79
Donaghcloney	Lagan River	Armagh City, Banbridge and Craigavon	4,935	112.81	43.75
Dromore	Lagan River	Armagh City, Banbridge and Craigavon	4,843	505.21	9.59
Gilford	Banbridge	Armagh City, Banbridge and Craigavon	4,997	126.11	39.62
Gransha	Lagan River	Armagh City, Banbridge and Craigavon	5,155	68.55	75.20
Hamiltonsbawn	Cusher	Armagh City, Banbridge and Craigavon	4,969	70.63	70.35
Keady	Armagh	Armagh City, Banbridge and Craigavon	5,243	73.28	71.54
Kernan	Craigavon	Armagh City, Banbridge and Craigavon	5,894	720.59	8.18
Killycomain	Portadown	Armagh City, Banbridge and Craigavon	5,247	2,040.57	2.57
Knocknashane	Lurgan	Armagh City, Banbridge and Craigavon	4,556	2,882.07	1.58
Lough Road	Lurgan	Armagh City, Banbridge and Craigavon	5,601	2,876.33	1.95
Loughbrickland	Banbridge	Armagh City, Banbridge and Craigavon	5,711	64.27	88.85
Loughgall	Portadown	Armagh City, Banbridge and Craigavon	5,484	78.56	69.81
Magheralin	Lurgan	Armagh City, Banbridge and Craigavon	5,368	377.54	14.22
Mahon	Portadown	Armagh City, Banbridge and Craigavon	5,172	276.34	18.72
Markethill	Cusher	Armagh City, Banbridge and Craigavon	5,632	63.16	89.17
Mourneview	Lurgan	Armagh City, Banbridge and Craigavon	5,495	3,146.42	1.75
Navan	Armagh	Armagh City, Banbridge and Craigavon	5,299	52.92	100.14
Parklake	Lurgan	Armagh City, Banbridge and Craigavon	5,648	1,965.36	2.87
Quilly	Lagan River	Armagh City, Banbridge and Craigavon	4,497	96.47	46.62
Rathfriland	Banbridge	Armagh City, Banbridge and Craigavon	5,009	89.03	56.26
Richhill	Cusher	Armagh City, Banbridge and Craigavon	4,837	132.80	36.42
Seagahan	Cusher	Armagh City, Banbridge and Craigavon	5,603	47.82	117.17
Shankill	Lurgan	Armagh City, Banbridge and Craigavon	6,446	3,529.72	1.83
Tandragee	Cusher	Armagh City, Banbridge and Craigavon	5,171	420.12	12.31
The Birches	Portadown	Armagh City, Banbridge and Craigavon	6,098	78.78	77.41
The Mall	Armagh	Armagh City, Banbridge and Craigavon	5,512	990.90	5.56
Waringstown	Lagan River	Armagh City, Banbridge and Craigavon	5,400	456.02	11.84
Andersonstown	Black Mountain	Belfast	4,648	4,750.66	0.98
Ardoyne	Oldpark	Belfast	5,490	10,235.66	0.54
Ballygomartin	Court	Belfast	5,952	2,162.58	2.75
Ballymacarrett	Titanic	Belfast	5,905	5,972.05	0.99
Ballymurphy	Black Mountain	Belfast	5,131	6,329.39	0.81
Ballysillan	Oldpark	Belfast	5,289	5,022.99	1.05
Beechmount	Black Mountain	Belfast	5,394	6,255.17	0.86
Beersbridge	Titanic	Belfast	6,610	6,952.38	0.95
Bellevue	Castle	Belfast	5,427	1,628.89	3.33
Belmont	Ormiston	Belfast	4,695	3,265.68	1.44
Belvoir	Balmoral	Belfast	5,359	980.42	5.47
Blackstaff	Botanic	Belfast	7,547	2,942.45	2.56
Bloomfield	Titanic	Belfast	5,894	7,224.94	0.82
Cavehill	Castle	Belfast	4,434	1,419.60	3.12
Central	Botanic	Belfast	15,446	5,497.58	2.81
Chichester Park	Castle	Belfast	5,409	4,590.58	1.18
Cliftonville	Oldpark	Belfast	5,657	4,978.47	1.14
Clonard	Court	Belfast	5,999	7,641.16	0.79
Collin Glen	Black Mountain	Belfast	5,656	591.59	9.56
Connswater	Titanic	Belfast	5,929	6,387.94	0.93
Cregagh	Lisnasharragh	Belfast	4,587	5,418.46	0.85
Duncairn	Castle	Belfast	8,338	870.49	9.58
Dunmurry	Collin	Belfast	5,207	2,732.84	1.91
Falls	Court	Belfast	5,179	4,705.79	1.10
Falls Park	Black Mountain	Belfast	4,742	2,145.41	2.21
Finaghy	Balmoral	Belfast	4,525	1,745.68	2.59
Forth River	Court	Belfast	4,921	1,134.76	4.34
Fortwilliam	Castle	Belfast	4,717	5,381.77	0.88
Garnerville	Ormiston	Belfast	4,788	1,649.90	2.90
Gilnahirk	Ormiston	Belfast	5,155	2,852.98	1.81
Hillfoot	Lisnasharragh	Belfast	4,582	1,747.56	2.62
Innisfayle	Castle	Belfast	5,315	4,178.79	1.27
Knock	Ormiston	Belfast	5,011	3,859.65	1.30
Ladybrook	Collin	Belfast	4,817	4,358.54	1.11
Lagmore	Collin	Belfast	8,344	3,840.08	2.17
Legoniel	Oldpark	Belfast	6,135	715.50	8.57
Malone	Balmoral	Belfast	4,811	2,333.71	2.06
Merok	Lisnasharragh	Belfast	4,438	3,124.83	1.42
Musgrave	Balmoral	Belfast	4,836	2,836.81	1.70
New Lodge	Oldpark	Belfast	4,881	6,815.49	0.72
Orangefield	Lisnasharragh	Belfast	4,756	3,787.13	1.26
Ormeau	Botanic	Belfast	6,532	4,463.82	1.46
Poleglass	Collin	Belfast	6,103	2,027.56	3.01
Ravenhill	Lisnasharragh	Belfast	4,823	4,696.18	1.03
Rosetta	Lisnasharragh	Belfast	5,793	5,215.15	1.11
Sandown	Ormiston	Belfast	4,470	4,762.57	0.94
Shandon	Ormiston	Belfast	5,377	2,056.76	2.61
Shankill	Court	Belfast	6,445	5,793.76	1.11
Shaw's Road	Black Mountain	Belfast	5,480	3,141.76	1.74
Stewartstown	Collin	Belfast	4,579	4,604.49	0.99
Stormont	Ormiston	Belfast	5,045	947.30	5.33
Stranmillis	Botanic	Belfast	8,978	3,638.12	2.47
Sydenham	Titanic	Belfast	5,589	613.62	9.11
Turf Lodge	Black Mountain	Belfast	4,569	1,928.80	2.37
Twinbrook	Collin	Belfast	4,917	3,475.45	1.41
Upper Malone	Balmoral	Belfast	4,974	1,150.65	4.32
Water Works	Oldpark	Belfast	6,910	5,075.00	1.36
Windsor	Botanic	Belfast	11,302	8,183.80	1.38
Woodstock	Titanic	Belfast	6,431	9,649.75	0.67
Woodvale	Court	Belfast	5,170	6,143.26	0.84
Aghadowey	Bann	Causeway Coast and Glens	3,453	29.08	118.76
Altahullion	Benbradagh	Causeway Coast and Glens	3,191	49.62	64.30
Atlantic	Causeway	Causeway Coast and Glens	4,536	847.17	5.35
Ballycastle	The Glens	Causeway Coast and Glens	3,397	1,447.41	2.35
Ballykelly	Benbradagh	Causeway Coast and Glens	3,103	54.34	57.11
Ballymoney East	Ballymoney	Causeway Coast and Glens	3,111	3,116.91	1.00
Ballymoney North	Ballymoney	Causeway Coast and Glens	3,401	945.94	3.60
Ballymoney South	Ballymoney	Causeway Coast and Glens	3,386	425.35	7.96
Castlerock	Bann	Causeway Coast and Glens	3,391	187.01	18.13
Churchland	Coleraine	Causeway Coast and Glens	3,643	2,310.09	1.58
Clogh Mills	Ballymoney	Causeway Coast and Glens	3,645	57.29	63.63
Coolessan	Limavady	Causeway Coast and Glens	2,920	2,581.05	1.13
Dervock	Causeway	Causeway Coast and Glens	3,449	55.84	61.76
Drumsurn	Limavady	Causeway Coast and Glens	3,663	82.90	44.19
Dundooan	Causeway	Causeway Coast and Glens	3,910	50.01	78.18
Dungiven	Benbradagh	Causeway Coast and Glens	3,297	24.44	134.88
Dunloy	Ballymoney	Causeway Coast and Glens	3,625	54.54	66.47
Feeny	Benbradagh	Causeway Coast and Glens	3,611	36.11	99.99
Garvagh	Bann	Causeway Coast and Glens	3,514	46.41	75.72
Giant's Causeway	Causeway	Causeway Coast and Glens	3,382	39.29	86.08
Greysteel	Benbradagh	Causeway Coast and Glens	4,642	128.51	36.12
Greystone	Limavady	Causeway Coast and Glens	3,486	3,099.77	1.12
Hopefield	Causeway	Causeway Coast and Glens	3,588	1,718.49	2.09
Kilrea	Bann	Causeway Coast and Glens	3,751	62.79	59.74
Kinbane	The Glens	Causeway Coast and Glens	4,041	48.59	83.16
Loughguile and Stranocum	The Glens	Causeway Coast and Glens	3,678	30.21	121.74
Lurigethan	The Glens	Causeway Coast and Glens	2,764	39.78	69.48
Macosquin	Bann	Causeway Coast and Glens	3,431	38.57	88.96
Magilligan	Limavady	Causeway Coast and Glens	3,481	24.00	145.01
Mountsandel	Coleraine	Causeway Coast and Glens	3,808	1,251.27	3.04
Portrush and Dunluce	Causeway	Causeway Coast and Glens	2,759	133.27	20.70
Portstewart	Causeway	Causeway Coast and Glens	2,915	774.25	3.76
Quarry	Coleraine	Causeway Coast and Glens	4,457	2,586.71	1.72
Rasharkin	Ballymoney	Causeway Coast and Glens	3,906	66.24	58.96
Roeside	Limavady	Causeway Coast and Glens	2,654	1,259.86	2.11
Route	Ballymoney	Causeway Coast and Glens	3,448	104.21	33.09
Torr Head and Rathlin	The Glens	Causeway Coast and Glens	3,597	14.21	253.11
University	Coleraine	Causeway Coast and Glens	3,654	1,341.18	2.72
Waterside	Coleraine	Causeway Coast and Glens	4,305	2,034.15	2.12
Windy Hall	Coleraine	Causeway Coast and Glens	3,754	1,287.89	2.91
Artigarvan	Sperrin	Derry City and Strabane	3,639	75.22	48.38
Ballycolman	Sperrin	Derry City and Strabane	3,530	1,969.60	1.79
Ballymagroarty	Foyleside	Derry City and Strabane	3,984	760.89	5.24
Brandywell	The Moor	Derry City and Strabane	3,185	4,952.83	0.64
Carn Hill	Ballyarnett	Derry City and Strabane	2,851	2,722.33	1.05
Castlederg	Derg	Derry City and Strabane	3,443	154.21	22.33
Caw	Waterside	Derry City and Strabane	4,334	2,620.90	1.65
City Walls	The Moor	Derry City and Strabane	3,242	2,947.46	1.10
Claudy	Faughan	Derry City and Strabane	3,500	42.32	82.71
Clondermot	Waterside	Derry City and Strabane	3,848	1,452.63	2.65
Creggan	The Moor	Derry City and Strabane	3,476	5,154.23	0.67
Creggan South	The Moor	Derry City and Strabane	3,849	3,755.63	1.02
Culmore	Ballyarnett	Derry City and Strabane	4,324	490.44	8.82
Drumahoe	Waterside	Derry City and Strabane	4,497	1,706.29	2.64
Dunnamanagh	Sperrin	Derry City and Strabane	3,513	25.75	136.45
Ebrington	Waterside	Derry City and Strabane	4,021	1,427.29	2.82
Eglinton	Faughan	Derry City and Strabane	3,910	271.87	14.38
Enagh	Faughan	Derry City and Strabane	4,393	99.77	44.03
Finn	Derg	Derry City and Strabane	4,321	101.67	42.50
Foyle Springs	Foyleside	Derry City and Strabane	3,043	3,555.98	0.86
Galliagh	Ballyarnett	Derry City and Strabane	3,749	4,162.52	0.90
Glenderg	Derg	Derry City and Strabane	3,200	15.09	212.05
Glenelly Valley	Sperrin	Derry City and Strabane	3,403	13.25	256.90
Kilfennan	Waterside	Derry City and Strabane	4,735	2,921.29	1.62
Lisnagelvin	Waterside	Derry City and Strabane	3,166	3,882.64	0.82
Madam's Bank	Foyleside	Derry City and Strabane	2,865	1,297.37	2.21
New Buildings	Faughan	Derry City and Strabane	3,831	708.61	5.41
Newtownstewart	Derg	Derry City and Strabane	3,102	35.27	87.95
Northland	Foyleside	Derry City and Strabane	4,844	3,748.27	1.29
Park	Sperrin	Derry City and Strabane	3,531	29.15	121.12
Shantallow	Ballyarnett	Derry City and Strabane	3,667	5,317.61	0.69
Shantallow East	Ballyarnett	Derry City and Strabane	4,266	2,412.32	1.77
Sheriff's Mountain	The Moor	Derry City and Strabane	3,337	154.08	21.66
Sion Mills	Derg	Derry City and Strabane	3,732	154.57	24.14
Skeoge	Ballyarnett	Derry City and Strabane	6,385	1,038.46	6.15
Slievekirk	Faughan	Derry City and Strabane	3,576	49.62	72.06
Springtown	Foyleside	Derry City and Strabane	2,883	1,746.07	1.65
Strabane North	Sperrin	Derry City and Strabane	4,006	1,017.17	3.94
Strabane West	Sperrin	Derry City and Strabane	3,105	2,373.96	1.31
Victoria	Waterside	Derry City and Strabane	4,468	1,229.12	3.64
Ballinamallard	Erne North	Fermanagh and Omagh	2,947	77.25	38.15
Belcoo and Garrison	Erne West	Fermanagh and Omagh	2,644	13.07	202.26
Belleek and Boa	Erne North	Fermanagh and Omagh	3,123	15.94	195.90
Beragh	Mid Tyrone	Fermanagh and Omagh	2,912	44.17	65.92
Boho, Cleenish and Letterbreen	Erne West	Fermanagh and Omagh	3,466	24.76	139.99
Brookeborough	Erne East	Fermanagh and Omagh	2,579	20.88	123.50
Camowen	Omagh	Fermanagh and Omagh	3,213	676.64	4.75
Castlecoole	Enniskillen	Fermanagh and Omagh	3,203	484.00	6.62
Coolnagard	Omagh	Fermanagh and Omagh	3,410	1,556.36	2.19
Dergmoney	Omagh	Fermanagh and Omagh	2,587	1,090.33	2.37
Derrygonnelly	Erne West	Fermanagh and Omagh	2,898	18.00	160.98
Derrylin	Erne West	Fermanagh and Omagh	2,794	26.45	105.65
Donagh	Erne East	Fermanagh and Omagh	2,527	23.17	109.06
Dromore	West Tyrone	Fermanagh and Omagh	2,784	61.65	45.16
Drumnakilly	Mid Tyrone	Fermanagh and Omagh	3,184	66.70	47.74
Drumquin	West Tyrone	Fermanagh and Omagh	2,910	18.38	158.31
Ederney and Kesh	Erne North	Fermanagh and Omagh	2,774	36.60	75.78
Erne	Enniskillen	Fermanagh and Omagh	3,054	948.62	3.22
Fairy Water	West Tyrone	Fermanagh and Omagh	2,826	25.57	110.50
Fintona	West Tyrone	Fermanagh and Omagh	2,553	41.78	61.11
Florence Court and Kinawley	Erne West	Fermanagh and Omagh	2,883	17.61	163.75
Gortin	Mid Tyrone	Fermanagh and Omagh	3,304	36.41	90.74
Gortrush	Omagh	Fermanagh and Omagh	3,217	966.95	3.33
Irvinestown	Erne North	Fermanagh and Omagh	3,387	80.11	42.28
Killyclogher	Omagh	Fermanagh and Omagh	3,051	2,072.15	1.47
Lisbellaw	Enniskillen	Fermanagh and Omagh	3,057	58.47	52.28
Lisnarrick	Enniskillen	Fermanagh and Omagh	3,356	44.53	75.36
Lisnaskea	Erne East	Fermanagh and Omagh	2,645	473.71	5.58
Maguiresbridge	Erne East	Fermanagh and Omagh	3,299	37.19	88.70
Newtownbutler	Erne East	Fermanagh and Omagh	2,567	28.31	90.66
Newtownsaville	West Tyrone	Fermanagh and Omagh	2,977	36.41	81.76
Owenkillew	Mid Tyrone	Fermanagh and Omagh	2,698	14.40	187.30
Portora	Enniskillen	Fermanagh and Omagh	3,185	770.84	4.13
Rosslea	Erne East	Fermanagh and Omagh	2,331	24.43	95.43
Rossorry	Enniskillen	Fermanagh and Omagh	2,543	442.57	5.75
Sixmilecross	Mid Tyrone	Fermanagh and Omagh	2,828	30.48	92.77
Strule	Omagh	Fermanagh and Omagh	2,971	1,268.94	2.34
Tempo	Erne North	Fermanagh and Omagh	2,878	31.81	90.49
Termon	Mid Tyrone	Fermanagh and Omagh	2,699	31.97	84.42
Trillick	West Tyrone	Fermanagh and Omagh	2,552	28.92	88.26
Ballinderry	Killultagh	Lisburn and Castlereagh	3,921	114.00	34.39
Ballyhanwood	Castlereagh East	Lisburn and Castlereagh	3,028	265.70	11.40
Ballymacash	Lisburn South	Lisburn and Castlereagh	3,137	3,432.17	0.91
Ballymacbrennan	Downshire East	Lisburn and Castlereagh	3,081	72.63	42.42
Ballymacoss	Lisburn South	Lisburn and Castlereagh	5,975	3,961.22	1.51
Beechill	Castlereagh South	Lisburn and Castlereagh	3,384	1,178.19	2.87
Blaris	Downshire West	Lisburn and Castlereagh	3,415	355.41	9.61
Cairnshill	Castlereagh South	Lisburn and Castlereagh	3,513	4,206.16	0.84
Carrowreagh	Castlereagh East	Lisburn and Castlereagh	6,124	828.22	7.39
Carryduff East	Castlereagh South	Lisburn and Castlereagh	3,823	302.71	12.63
Carryduff West	Castlereagh South	Lisburn and Castlereagh	3,351	792.27	4.23
Derryaghy	Lisburn North	Lisburn and Castlereagh	4,627	1,356.54	3.41
Dromara	Downshire East	Lisburn and Castlereagh	3,460	82.20	42.09
Drumbo	Downshire East	Lisburn and Castlereagh	3,039	127.98	23.75
Dundonald	Castlereagh East	Lisburn and Castlereagh	3,105	1,472.64	2.11
Enler	Castlereagh East	Lisburn and Castlereagh	3,205	5,160.22	0.62
Galwally	Castlereagh South	Lisburn and Castlereagh	3,040	2,818.32	1.08
Glenavy	Killultagh	Lisburn and Castlereagh	4,079	126.20	32.32
Graham's Bridge	Castlereagh East	Lisburn and Castlereagh	3,312	3,340.18	0.99
Harmony Hill	Lisburn North	Lisburn and Castlereagh	3,022	3,350.83	0.90
Hilden	Lisburn North	Lisburn and Castlereagh	3,902	2,594.67	1.50
Hillhall	Downshire East	Lisburn and Castlereagh	4,065	536.57	7.58
Hillsborough	Downshire West	Lisburn and Castlereagh	3,312	145.94	22.69
Knockbracken	Castlereagh South	Lisburn and Castlereagh	3,534	1,001.38	3.53
Knockmore	Lisburn South	Lisburn and Castlereagh	4,658	1,101.94	4.23
Lagan	Downshire West	Lisburn and Castlereagh	3,477	77.88	44.65
Lagan Valley	Lisburn South	Lisburn and Castlereagh	3,397	3,277.87	1.04
Lambeg	Lisburn North	Lisburn and Castlereagh	3,817	873.44	4.37
Lisnagarvey	Lisburn South	Lisburn and Castlereagh	2,939	3,928.19	0.75
Maghaberry	Killultagh	Lisburn and Castlereagh	4,782	223.45	21.40
Magheralave	Lisburn North	Lisburn and Castlereagh	4,255	2,512.51	1.69
Maze	Downshire West	Lisburn and Castlereagh	3,228	184.23	17.52
Moira	Downshire West	Lisburn and Castlereagh	3,747	948.51	3.95
Moneyreagh	Castlereagh East	Lisburn and Castlereagh	3,125	124.56	25.09
Newtownbreda	Castlereagh South	Lisburn and Castlereagh	2,843	3,786.77	0.75
Old Warren	Lisburn South	Lisburn and Castlereagh	4,122	4,151.82	0.99
Ravernet	Downshire East	Lisburn and Castlereagh	3,096	88.41	35.02
Stonyford	Killultagh	Lisburn and Castlereagh	3,149	50.26	62.66
Wallace Park	Lisburn North	Lisburn and Castlereagh	3,862	2,004.58	1.93
White Mountain	Killultagh	Lisburn and Castlereagh	6,138	454.38	13.51
Academy	Ballymena	Mid and East Antrim	2,567	983.80	2.61
Ahoghill	Bannside	Mid and East Antrim	3,607	520.48	6.93
Ardeevin	Ballymena	Mid and East Antrim	3,715	1,081.53	3.43
Ballee and Harryville	Braid	Mid and East Antrim	3,588	860.43	4.17
Ballycarry and Glynn	Larne Lough	Mid and East Antrim	3,747	81.97	45.71
Ballykeel	Ballymena	Mid and East Antrim	3,026	2,088.72	1.45
Boneybefore	Carrick Castle	Mid and East Antrim	2,864	3,131.70	0.91
Braidwater	Ballymena	Mid and East Antrim	3,214	1,793.25	1.79
Broughshane	Braid	Mid and East Antrim	3,726	236.82	15.73
Burleigh Hill	Knockagh	Mid and East Antrim	2,594	2,279.55	1.14
Cairncastle	Coast Road	Mid and East Antrim	3,237	100.55	32.19
Carnlough and Glenarm	Coast Road	Mid and East Antrim	3,137	28.39	110.49
Castle	Carrick Castle	Mid and East Antrim	3,913	2,982.44	1.31
Castle Demesne	Ballymena	Mid and East Antrim	4,446	2,774.90	1.60
Craigyhill	Coast Road	Mid and East Antrim	3,920	2,198.10	1.78
Cullybackey	Bannside	Mid and East Antrim	2,869	580.16	4.95
Curran and Inver	Larne Lough	Mid and East Antrim	3,384	725.38	4.67
Fair Green	Ballymena	Mid and East Antrim	4,262	3,487.71	1.22
Galgorm	Bannside	Mid and East Antrim	3,254	324.19	10.04
Gardenmore	Coast Road	Mid and East Antrim	3,290	1,876.66	1.75
Glenravel	Braid	Mid and East Antrim	3,595	40.98	87.73
Glenwhirry	Braid	Mid and East Antrim	3,160	27.49	114.95
Gortalee	Knockagh	Mid and East Antrim	3,693	3,160.74	1.17
Grange	Bannside	Mid and East Antrim	3,720	61.62	60.37
Greenisland	Knockagh	Mid and East Antrim	3,446	547.30	6.30
Islandmagee	Larne Lough	Mid and East Antrim	3,048	93.09	32.74
Kells	Braid	Mid and East Antrim	3,453	158.39	21.80
Kilroot	Carrick Castle	Mid and East Antrim	4,254	220.85	19.26
Kilwaughter	Larne Lough	Mid and East Antrim	4,791	74.18	64.59
Kirkinriola	Braid	Mid and East Antrim	3,228	54.24	59.51
Love Lane	Carrick Castle	Mid and East Antrim	3,033	2,535.93	1.20
Maine	Bannside	Mid and East Antrim	3,044	53.40	57.01
Park	Ballymena	Mid and East Antrim	2,921	2,462.67	1.19
Portglenone	Bannside	Mid and East Antrim	3,351	84.77	39.53
Slemish	Braid	Mid and East Antrim	3,207	17.90	179.17
Sunnylands	Knockagh	Mid and East Antrim	4,097	4,971.53	0.82
The Maidens	Coast Road	Mid and East Antrim	3,438	2,430.32	1.41
Victoria	Carrick Castle	Mid and East Antrim	4,394	2,646.42	1.66
Whitehead South	Larne Lough	Mid and East Antrim	3,345	434.01	7.71
Woodburn	Knockagh	Mid and East Antrim	3,428	69.87	49.07
Ardboe	Torrent	Mid Ulster	3,818	27.87	137.01
Augher and Clogher	Clogher Valley	Mid Ulster	3,460	34.62	99.94
Aughnacloy	Clogher Valley	Mid Ulster	3,696	44.10	83.81
Ballygawley	Clogher Valley	Mid Ulster	3,940	51.32	76.78
Ballymaguigan	Moyola	Mid Ulster	4,144	95.54	43.37
Ballysaggart	Dungannon	Mid Ulster	5,062	1,279.30	3.96
Bellaghy	Moyola	Mid Ulster	3,879	92.99	41.72
Caledon	Clogher Valley	Mid Ulster	3,963	42.26	93.78
Castlecaulfield	Clogher Valley	Mid Ulster	3,759	90.13	41.71
Castledawson	Moyola	Mid Ulster	3,792	110.65	34.27
Coagh	Cookstown	Mid Ulster	3,371	80.91	41.66
Coalisland North	Torrent	Mid Ulster	3,671	286.12	12.83
Coalisland South	Torrent	Mid Ulster	4,842	1,565.04	3.09
Cookstown East	Cookstown	Mid Ulster	3,790	784.22	4.83
Cookstown South	Cookstown	Mid Ulster	3,524	1,589.08	2.22
Cookstown West	Cookstown	Mid Ulster	3,688	1,392.18	2.65
Coolshinny	Magherafelt	Mid Ulster	4,048	63.92	63.33
Donaghmore	Torrent	Mid Ulster	3,839	61.20	62.73
Draperstown	Moyola	Mid Ulster	3,266	55.13	59.24
Fivemiletown	Clogher Valley	Mid Ulster	3,174	21.34	148.76
Glebe	Magherafelt	Mid Ulster	3,845	1,492.16	2.58
Killyman	Dungannon	Mid Ulster	3,619	111.95	32.33
Killymeal	Dungannon	Mid Ulster	5,003	503.53	9.94
Lissan	Magherafelt	Mid Ulster	3,594	42.92	83.74
Loughry	Cookstown	Mid Ulster	2,955	104.78	28.20
Lower Glenshane	Carntogher	Mid Ulster	3,153	38.49	81.91
Maghera	Carntogher	Mid Ulster	3,469	816.58	4.25
Moy	Dungannon	Mid Ulster	3,950	116.80	33.82
Moygashel	Dungannon	Mid Ulster	3,606	641.73	5.62
Mullaghmore	Dungannon	Mid Ulster	4,408	522.11	8.44
Oaklands	Cookstown	Mid Ulster	3,413	30.24	112.86
Pomeroy	Cookstown	Mid Ulster	3,879	51.73	74.98
Stewartstown	Torrent	Mid Ulster	3,110	46.99	66.19
Swatragh	Carntogher	Mid Ulster	3,458	48.41	71.43
Tamlaght O'Crilly	Carntogher	Mid Ulster	3,647	72.08	50.60
The Loup	Magherafelt	Mid Ulster	4,260	62.57	68.09
Tobermore	Moyola	Mid Ulster	3,458	53.18	65.02
Town Parks East	Magherafelt	Mid Ulster	3,557	2,176.28	1.63
Valley	Carntogher	Mid Ulster	3,443	64.42	53.45
Washing Bay	Torrent	Mid Ulster	3,738	88.36	42.31
Abbey	Newry	Newry, Mourne and Down	4,082	1,238.50	3.30
Annalong	The Mournes	Newry, Mourne and Down	4,347	96.19	45.19
Ballybot	Newry	Newry, Mourne and Down	5,351	2,169.58	2.47
Ballydugan	Slieve Croob	Newry, Mourne and Down	3,771	44.94	83.92
Ballynahinch	Rowallane	Newry, Mourne and Down	4,681	1,290.34	3.63
Ballyward	Slieve Croob	Newry, Mourne and Down	4,499	37.03	121.51
Bessbrook	Slieve Gullion	Newry, Mourne and Down	5,535	1,418.77	3.90
Binnian	The Mournes	Newry, Mourne and Down	4,303	70.77	60.80
Burren	Crotlieve	Newry, Mourne and Down	4,317	182.54	23.65
Camlough	Slieve Gullion	Newry, Mourne and Down	4,147	98.30	42.19
Castlewellan	Slieve Croob	Newry, Mourne and Down	4,479	180.38	24.83
Cathedral	Downpatrick	Newry, Mourne and Down	4,217	676.98	6.23
Crossgar and Killyleagh	Rowallane	Newry, Mourne and Down	4,404	198.31	22.21
Crossmaglen	Slieve Gullion	Newry, Mourne and Down	3,973	109.01	36.45
Damolly	Newry	Newry, Mourne and Down	4,389	2,106.36	2.08
Derryboy	Rowallane	Newry, Mourne and Down	4,045	53.14	76.11
Derryleckagh	Crotlieve	Newry, Mourne and Down	4,906	141.17	34.75
Donard	The Mournes	Newry, Mourne and Down	3,757	365.32	10.28
Drumalane	Newry	Newry, Mourne and Down	5,018	2,123.73	2.36
Drumaness	Slieve Croob	Newry, Mourne and Down	4,142	113.51	36.49
Dundrum	Slieve Croob	Newry, Mourne and Down	4,501	107.82	41.74
Fathom	Newry	Newry, Mourne and Down	4,444	110.31	40.29
Forkhill	Slieve Gullion	Newry, Mourne and Down	4,174	73.66	56.66
Hilltown	Crotlieve	Newry, Mourne and Down	5,134	60.72	84.55
Kilkeel	The Mournes	Newry, Mourne and Down	3,931	647.10	6.07
Kilmore	Rowallane	Newry, Mourne and Down	3,974	63.29	62.79
Knocknashinna	Downpatrick	Newry, Mourne and Down	4,679	898.30	5.21
Lecale	Downpatrick	Newry, Mourne and Down	4,387	79.58	55.13
Lisnacree	The Mournes	Newry, Mourne and Down	4,731	48.67	97.21
Mayobridge	Crotlieve	Newry, Mourne and Down	5,314	84.71	62.73
Mullaghbane	Slieve Gullion	Newry, Mourne and Down	4,441	79.14	56.12
Murlough	The Mournes	Newry, Mourne and Down	4,837	437.46	11.06
Newtownhamilton	Slieve Gullion	Newry, Mourne and Down	4,417	46.86	94.27
Quoile	Downpatrick	Newry, Mourne and Down	4,172	125.83	33.15
Rostrevor	Crotlieve	Newry, Mourne and Down	4,343	120.89	35.92
Saintfield	Rowallane	Newry, Mourne and Down	4,118	273.41	15.06
St. Patrick's	Newry	Newry, Mourne and Down	4,664	2,794.76	1.67
Strangford	Downpatrick	Newry, Mourne and Down	4,460	43.92	101.55
Tollymore	The Mournes	Newry, Mourne and Down	4,303	39.45	109.07
Warrenpoint	Crotlieve	Newry, Mourne and Down	4,614	2,080.85	2.22
Whitecross	Slieve Gullion	Newry, Mourne and Down	4,065	60.63	67.04
Ballycrochan	Bangor East and Donaghadee	Ards and North Down	3,118	1,283.30	2.43
Ballygowan	Comber	Ards and North Down	4,368	162.14	26.94
Ballygrainey	Bangor Central	Ards and North Down	6,301	874.01	7.21
Ballyholme	Bangor Central	Ards and North Down	3,891	3,668.99	1.06
Ballymagee	Bangor East and Donaghadee	Ards and North Down	4,119	3,387.50	1.22
Ballywalter	Ards Peninsula	Ards and North Down	4,647	86.21	53.90
Bloomfield	Bangor Central	Ards and North Down	4,188	2,780.03	1.51
Broadway	Bangor Central	Ards and North Down	3,421	2,268.54	1.51
Bryansburn	Bangor West	Ards and North Down	3,759	2,951.75	1.27
Carrowdore	Ards Peninsula	Ards and North Down	4,260	81.65	52.17
Castle	Bangor Central	Ards and North Down	4,029	2,438.30	1.65
Clandeboye	Holywood and Clandeboye	Ards and North Down	4,189	278.71	15.03
Comber North	Comber	Ards and North Down	3,790	651.47	5.82
Comber South	Comber	Ards and North Down	3,786	107.86	35.10
Comber West	Comber	Ards and North Down	3,807	428.71	8.88
Conway Square	Newtownards	Ards and North Down	4,317	1,339.28	3.22
Cronstown	Newtownards	Ards and North Down	4,479	3,870.91	1.16
Cultra	Holywood and Clandeboye	Ards and North Down	4,007	232.32	17.25
Donaghadee	Bangor East and Donaghadee	Ards and North Down	3,972	2,529.11	1.57
Glen	Newtownards	Ards and North Down	4,521	722.63	6.26
Gregstown	Newtownards	Ards and North Down	3,183	2,678.37	1.19
Groomsport	Bangor East and Donaghadee	Ards and North Down	3,630	538.23	6.74
Harbour	Bangor Central	Ards and North Down	4,752	3,845.66	1.24
Helen's Bay	Holywood and Clandeboye	Ards and North Down	3,901	473.07	8.25
Holywood	Holywood and Clandeboye	Ards and North Down	4,065	827.52	4.91
Kilcooley	Bangor West	Ards and North Down	4,425	3,876.51	1.14
Killinchy	Comber	Ards and North Down	3,737	48.78	76.61
Kircubbin	Ards Peninsula	Ards and North Down	4,396	69.99	62.81
Loughries	Ards Peninsula	Ards and North Down	4,170	101.48	41.09
Loughview	Holywood and Clandeboye	Ards and North Down	4,662	966.80	4.82
Movilla	Newtownards	Ards and North Down	4,244	3,507.75	1.21
Portaferry	Ards Peninsula	Ards and North Down	3,544	83.56	42.41
Portavogie	Ards Peninsula	Ards and North Down	3,865	210.37	18.37
Rathgael	Bangor West	Ards and North Down	3,684	3,180.81	1.16
Rathmore	Bangor West	Ards and North Down	3,699	2,888.55	1.28
Scrabo	Newtownards	Ards and North Down	4,257	203.89	20.88
Silverbirch	Bangor East and Donaghadee	Ards and North Down	3,729	4,518.77	0.83
Silverstream	Bangor West	Ards and North Down	3,960	5,305.38	0.75
Warren	Bangor East and Donaghadee	Ards and North Down	4,309	222.64	19.35
West Winds	Newtownards	Ards and North Down	4,467	693.71	6.44

=== Composition of district councils ===
This table shows number of councillors by party, election, and district, based on the three local elections that have occurred since local government reform in 2014-15.

'S.' denotes seats. '14', '19' and '23' denote the years 2014, 2019 and 2023. This table does not reflect any notional changes between the 2011 election and the 2014 election. 'Minor Nat.' includes independent nationalists and Aontú. 'Minor Un.' includes independent unionists, NI21 and UKIP. 'Minor Other' includes other independents and Labour Alternative.

Council	Yr	SF		DUP		APNI		UUP		SDLP		TUV		GPNI		PBP		Minor Nat.		Minor Un.		Minor Other		Total Nat		Total Unionist		Total Other		Total
Council	Yr	S.	±	S.	±	S.	±	S.	±	S.	±	S.	±	S.	±	S.	±	S.	±	S.	±	S.	±	S.	±	S.	±	S.	±	Total
Antrim & Newtownabbey	14	3	Steady	14	Steady	4	Steady	13	Steady	4	Steady	2	Steady		Steady		Steady		Steady		Steady		Steady	7	Steady	29	Steady	4	Steady	40
Antrim & Newtownabbey	19	5	▲2	14	Steady	7	▲3	9	▼4	4	Steady		▼2		Steady		Steady		Steady		Steady	1	▲1	9	▲2	23	▼6	8	▲4	40
Antrim & Newtownabbey	23	9	▲4	13	▼1	8	▲1	7	▼2	1	▼3		Steady		Steady		Steady		Steady		Steady	2	▲1	10	▲1	20	▼3	10	▲2	40
Ards & North Down	14		Steady	17	Steady	7	Steady	9	Steady	1	Steady	1	Steady	3	Steady		Steady		Steady	2	Steady		Steady	1	Steady	29	Steady	10	Steady	40
Ards & North Down	19		Steady	14	▼3	10	▲3	8	▼1	1	Steady	1	Steady	3	Steady		Steady		Steady	2	Steady	1	▲1	1	Steady	25	▼4	14	▲4	40
Ards & North Down	23		Steady	14	Steady	12	▲2	8	Steady	1	Steady		▼1	2	▼1		Steady		Steady	2	Steady	1	Steady	1	Steady	24	▼1	15	▲1	40
Armagh, Banbridge & Craigavon	14	8	Steady	13	Steady		Steady	12	Steady	6	Steady		Steady		Steady		Steady		Steady	2	Steady		Steady	14	Steady	27	Steady	Steady	Steady	41
Armagh, Banbridge & Craigavon	19	10	▲2	11	▼2	3	▲3	10	▼2	6	Steady		Steady		Steady		Steady		Steady	1	▼1		Steady	16	▲2	22	▼5	3	▲3	41
Armagh, Banbridge & Craigavon	23	15	▲5	13	▲2	4	▲1	6	▼4	1	▼5	1	▲1		Steady		Steady		Steady	1	Steady		Steady	16	Steady	21	▼1	4	▲1	41
Belfast City	14	19	Steady	13	Steady	8	Steady	7	Steady	7	Steady	1	Steady	1	Steady	1	Steady		Steady	3	Steady		Steady	26	Steady	24	Steady	10	Steady	60
Belfast City	19	18	▼1	15	▲2	10	▲2	2	▼5	6	▼1		▼1	4	▲3	3	▲2		Steady	2	▼1		Steady	24	▼2	19	▼5	17	▲7	60
Belfast City	23	22	▲4	14	▼1	11	▲1	2	Steady	5	▼1	1	▲1	3	▼1	1	▼2	1	▲1		▼2		Steady	28	▲4	17	▼2	15	▼2	60
Causeway Coast & Glens	14	7	Steady	11	Steady	1	Steady	10	Steady	6	Steady	3	Steady		Steady		Steady	1	Steady	1	Steady		Steady	14	Steady	25	Steady	1	Steady	40
Causeway Coast & Glens	19	9	▲2	14	▲3	2	▲1	7	▼3	6	Steady		▼3		Steady		Steady	1	Steady	1	Steady		Steady	16	▲2	22	▼3	2	▲1	40
Causeway Coast & Glens	23	12	▲3	13	▼1	5	▲3	4	▼3	3	▼3	2	▲2		Steady		Steady		▼1	1	Steady		Steady	15	▼1	20	▼2	5	▲3	40
Derry City & Strabane	14	16	Steady	8	Steady		Steady	2	Steady	10	Steady		Steady		Steady		Steady	4	Steady		Steady		Steady	30	Steady	10	Steady	0	Steady	40
Derry City & Strabane	19	11	▼5	7	▼1	2	▲2	2	Steady	11	▲1		Steady		Steady	2	▲2	5	▲1		Steady		Steady	27	▼3	9	▼1	4	▲4	40
Derry City & Strabane	23	18	▲7	5	▼2		▼2	3	▲1	10	▼1		Steady		Steady	1	▼1	3	▼2		Steady		Steady	31	▲4	8	▼1	1	▼3	40
Fermanagh & Omagh	14	17	Steady	5	Steady		Steady	9	Steady	8	Steady		Steady		Steady		Steady	1	Steady		Steady		Steady	26	Steady	14	Steady	0	Steady	40
Fermanagh & Omagh	19	15	▼2	5	Steady	1	▲1	9	Steady	5	▼3		Steady		Steady		Steady	4	▲3		Steady	1	▲1	24	▼2	14	Steady	2	▲2	40
Fermanagh & Omagh	23	21	▲6	6	▲1	2	▲1	7	▼2	3	▼2		Steady		Steady		Steady	1	▼3		Steady		▼1	25	▲1	13	▼1	2	Steady	40
Lisburn & Castlereagh	14		Steady	20	Steady	7	Steady	8	Steady	3	Steady	1	Steady		Steady		Steady		Steady	1	Steady		Steady	3	Steady	30	Steady	7	Steady	40
Lisburn & Castlereagh	19	2	▲2	15	▼5	9	▲2	11	▲3	2	▼1		▼1	1	▲1		Steady		Steady		▼1		Steady	4	▲1	26	▼4	10	▲3	40
Lisburn & Castlereagh	23	4	▲2	14	▼1	13	▲4	6	▼5	2	Steady		Steady		▼1		Steady		Steady	1	▲1		Steady	6	▲2	21	▼5	13	▲3	40
Mid & East Antrim	14	3	Steady	16	Steady	3	Steady	9	Steady	1	Steady	5	Steady		Steady		Steady		Steady	3	Steady		Steady	4	Steady	33	Steady	3	Steady	40
Mid & East Antrim	19	2	▼1	15	▼1	7	▲4	7	▼2	1	Steady	5	Steady		Steady		Steady		Steady	3	Steady		Steady	3	▼1	30	▼3	7	▲4	40
Mid & East Antrim	23	4	▲2	14	▼1	7	Steady	8	▲1		▼1	5	Steady		Steady		Steady		Steady	2	▼1		Steady	4	▲1	29	▼1	7	Steady	40
Mid Ulster	14	18	Steady	8	Steady		Steady	7	Steady	6	Steady		Steady		Steady		Steady	1	Steady		Steady		Steady	25	Steady	15	Steady	0	Steady	40
Mid Ulster	19	17	▼1	9	▲1		Steady	6	▼1	6	Steady		Steady		Steady		Steady	2	▲1		Steady		Steady	25	Steady	15	Steady	0	Steady	40
Mid Ulster	23	19	▲2	11	▲2		Steady	2	▼4	5	▼1		Steady		Steady		Steady	3	▲1		Steady		Steady	27	▲2	13	▼2	0	Steady	40
Newry, Mourne & Down	14	14	Steady	4	Steady	2	Steady	3	Steady	14	Steady		Steady		Steady		Steady	2	Steady	2	Steady	1	Steady	30	Steady	8	Steady	3	Steady	41
Newry, Mourne & Down	19	16	▲2	3	▼1	2	Steady	4	▲1	11	▼3		Steady		Steady		Steady	3	▲1	1	▼1	1	Steady	30	Steady	8	Steady	3	Steady	41
Newry, Mourne & Down	23	20	▲1	5	▲2	5	▲3	1	▼3	8	▼4		Steady		Steady		Steady	2	▼1	0	▼1	0	▼1	30	Steady	6	▼2	5	▲2	41
**Total**	14	**105**	Steady	**130**	Steady	**32**	Steady	**88**	Steady	**66**	Steady	**13**	Steady	**4**	Steady	**1**	Steady	**9**	Steady	**13**	Steady	**1**	Steady	**180**	Steady	**244**	Steady	**38**	Steady	462
**Total**	19	**105**	Steady	**122**	▼**8**	**53**	▲**21**	**75**	▼**14**	**59**	▼7	**6**	▼**7**	**8**	▲**4**	**5**	▲**4**	**15**	▲**6**	**10**	▼**3**	**4**	▲**3**	**179**	**▼1**	**213**	**▼31**	**70**	**▲32**	462
**Total**	23	**144**	▲**39**	**122**	Steady	67	▲**14**	**54**	▼**21**	**39**	▼**20**	**9**	▲**3**	**5**	▼**3**	2	▼**3**	**10**	▼**5**	**7**	▼**3**	**3**	▼**1**	**193**	**▲14**	**192**	**▼21**	**77**	**▲7**	462
Council	Yr	S.	±	S.	±	S.	±	S.	±	S.	±	S.	±	S.	±	S.	±	S.	±	S.	±	S.	±	S.	±	S.	±	S.	±	Total
Council	Yr	SF		DUP		APNI		UUP		SDLP		TUV		GPNI		PBP		Minor Nat.		Minor Un.		Minor Other		Total Nat		Total Unionist		Total Other		Total

== See also ==
- List of districts in Northern Ireland by religion or religion brought up in
- Political make-up of local councils in Northern Ireland
- Local government in England
- Local government in Scotland
- Local government in Wales
- Local government in the Republic of Ireland

=== Tables relating to the old 26 council system ===
- List of districts in Northern Ireland by national identity
