= Armagh City, Banbridge and Craigavon =

Local government district in Northern Ireland

- District and borough
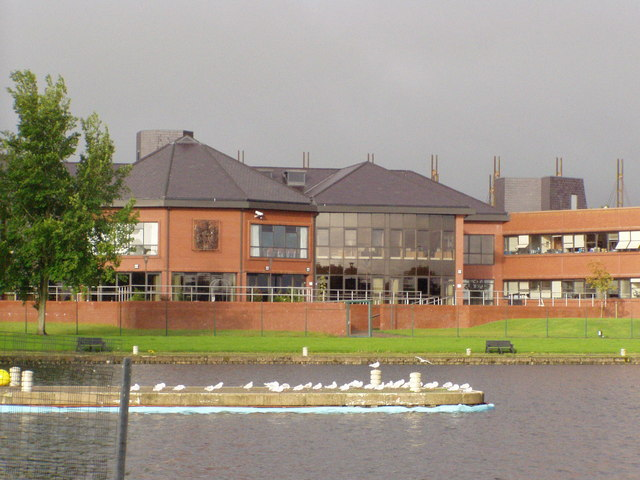
- Craigavon Civic and Conference Centre houses the district offices

- Armagh, Banbridge and Craigavon shown within Northern Ireland
- Coordinates: 54.351°N 6.492°W
- Sovereign state: United Kingdom
- Country: Northern Ireland
- Incorporated: 1 April 2015
- Named after: City of Armagh, Banbridge and the Borough of Craigavon
- Administrative HQ: Craigavon Civic and Conference Centre

Government
  - Type: District council
  - Body: Armagh City, Banbridge and Craigavon Borough Council
  - Executive: Committee system
  - Control: No overall control

Area
  - Total: 514 sq mi (1,332 km^{2})
  - Rank: 5th

Population (2024)
  - Total: 222,511
  - Rank: 2nd
  - Density: 430/sq mi (167/km^{2})
- Time zone: UTC+0 (GMT)
  - Summer (DST): UTC+1 (BST)
- Postcode areas: BT
- Dialling codes: 028
- ISO 3166 code: GB-ABC
- GSS code: N09000002
- Website: armaghbanbridgecraigavon.gov.uk

Armagh City, Banbridge and Craigavon is a local government district in Northern Ireland. The district was created as Armagh, Banbridge and Craigavon on 1 April 2015 by merging the City and District of Armagh, Banbridge District and most of the Borough of Craigavon. The word "City" was added to the name on 24 February 2016, to reflect Armagh's city status. The local authority is Armagh City, Banbridge and Craigavon Borough Council.

== Geography ==
The district covers parts of counties Armagh and Down, taking in the upper Bann valley and much of the southern shore of Lough Neagh as well as Armagh city. It had a population of 222,511 in 2024. The name of the new district was announced on 17 September 2008.

== Demographics ==
In the 2021 UK census, the district was 96.7% white.

The national identities of the new council from the 2011 census were:

- 50.5% British
- 28.9% Northern Irish
- 25.2% Irish
- 4.6% Other
- 1.3% English, Scottish, Welsh

The religious makeup was as follows:

- 51.7% Protestant/other Christian
- 43.0% Catholic
- 5.3% Other/none

== Armagh City, Banbridge and Craigavon Borough Council ==
Armagh City, Banbridge and Craigavon Borough Council replaces Armagh City and District Council, Banbridge District Council and Craigavon Borough Council.

The first election for the new district council was originally due to take place in May 2009, but on April 25, 2008, Shaun Woodward, Secretary of State for Northern Ireland announced that the scheduled 2009 district council elections were to be postponed until 2011. The first elections took place on 22 May 2014 and the council acted as a shadow authority until 1 April 2015.

== See also ==
- Local government in Northern Ireland
