= Newry, Mourne and Down =

Local government district in Northern Ireland

Newry, Mourne and Down: Irish: An tIúr, Múrna agus an Dún; Ulster Scots: Newrie, Morne an Doon
- District
- The Downshire Civic Centre in Downpatrick houses the district offices

- Newry, Mourne and Down shown within Northern Ireland
- Coordinates: 54.111°N 6.161°W
- Sovereign state: United Kingdom
- Country: Northern Ireland
- Incorporated: 1 April 2015
- Named for: Newry and Mourne, and Down
- Administrative HQ: Downshire Civic Centre, Downpatrick

Government
  - Type: District council
  - Body: Newry, Mourne and Down District Council
  - Executive: Committee system
  - Control: No overall control

Area
  - Total: 629 sq mi (1,628 km^{2})
  - Rank: 4th

Population (2024)
  - Total: 183,115
  - Rank: 3rd
  - Density: 290/sq mi (112/km^{2})
- Time zone: UTC+0 (GMT)
  - Summer (DST): UTC+1 (BST)
- Postcode areas: BT
- Dialling codes: 028
- ISO 3166 code: GB-NMD
- GSS code: N09000010
- Website: newrymournedown.org

Newry, Mourne and Down is a local government district in Northern Ireland that was created on 1 April 2015 by merging Newry and Mourne District and Down District. It covers most of the southeastern part of Northern Ireland. The local authority is Newry, Mourne and Down District Council. The principal population centres are Newry in the south of the district, and Downpatrick in the north; both these urban areas were seats of previous council areas.

== Geography ==
It covers the Southeast of Northern Ireland, including southern County Armagh and large parts of County Down. It incorporates all of the Mourne Mountains and much of the Ring of Gullion, both designated as an Area of Outstanding Natural Beauty. The area has an extensive coastline stretching from Strangford Lough in the north to Carlingford Lough, in the south and borders counties Louth and Monaghan in the Republic of Ireland. The district had a population of 183,115 in 2024. The name of the new district was announced on 17 September 2008.

== Newry, Mourne and Down District Council ==
Newry, Mourne and Down District Council replaces Newry and Mourne District Council and Down District Council. The first election for the new district council was originally due to take place in May 2009, but in April 2008, Shaun Woodward, Secretary of State for Northern Ireland announced that the scheduled 2009 district council elections were to be postponed until 2011. The first elections took place on 22 May 2014 and the council acted as a shadow authority until 1 April 2015.
