= Ards and North Down =

Local government district in Northern Ireland

- District and borough
- Bangor Castle houses the district offices

- Ards and North Down shown within Northern Ireland
- Coordinates: 54.562°N 5.637°W
- Sovereign state: United Kingdom
- Country: Northern Ireland
- Incorporated: 1 April 2015
- Named after: Borough of Ards and the Borough of North Down
- Administrative HQ: Bangor Castle

Government
  - Type: District council
  - Body: Ards and North Down Borough Council
  - Executive: Committee system
  - Control: No overall control

Area
  - Total: 177 sq mi (458 km^{2})
  - Rank: 10th

Population (2024)
  - Total: 165,415
  - Rank: 4th
  - Density: 930/sq mi (361/km^{2})
- Time zone: UTC+0 (GMT)
  - Summer (DST): UTC+1 (BST)
- Postcode areas: BT
- Dialling codes: 028
- ISO 3166 code: GB-AND
- GSS code: N09000011
- Website: ardsandnorthdown.gov.uk

Ards and North Down is a local government district in Northern Ireland. It was created on 1 April 2015 by merging the Borough of Ards and the Borough of North Down. The local authority is Ards and North Down Borough Council.

== Geography ==
The new district is in the East of Northern Ireland, covering the Ards Peninsula, most of Strangford Lough and the southern shore of Belfast Lough. It had an estimated population of 165,415 in 2024. The original name of the new district was recommended on 17 September 2008.

== Council ==
Ards and North Down Borough Council replaces Ards Borough Council and North Down Borough Council. The first election for the new district council was originally due to take place in May 2009, but on April 25, 2008, Shaun Woodward, Secretary of State for Northern Ireland, announced that the scheduled 2009 district council elections were to be postponed until 2011. The first elections took place on 22 May 2014 and the council acted as a shadow authority until 1 April 2015.

At a meeting of the shadow authority on 15 December 2014, councillors voted in favour of changing the council's name to East Coast Borough Council, and to submit an application to the Department of the Environment to change the name with effect as of 1 April 2015. However, the council's website launched on 1 April 2015 refers to the new council as "Ards and North Down Borough Council", and this name has continued in use.

== Freedom of the Borough ==
The following have received the Freedom of the Borough of Ards and North Down.

=== Individuals ===
- Gary Lightbody OBE: 30 August 2022.
- Rhys McClenaghan MBE BEM: 25 January 2026.

=== Military Units ===
- The Irish Guards: 24 June 2022.

=== Organisations and Groups ===
- The South Eastern Health and Social Care Trust: 1 September 2018.

== See also ==
- Local government in Northern Ireland
