= Mid and East Antrim =

Local government district in Northern Ireland

- District and borough
- Mid and East Antrim district shown within Northern Ireland
- Coordinates: 54.828°N 6.078°W
- Sovereign state: United Kingdom
- Country: Northern Ireland
- Incorporated: 1 April 2015
- Named for: County Antrim
- Administrative HQ: Ballymena

Government
  - Type: District council
  - Body: Mid and East Antrim Borough Council
  - Executive: Committee system
  - Control: No overall control

Area
  - Total: 403 sq mi (1,045 km^{2})
  - Rank: 7th

Population (2024)
  - Total: 139,913
  - Rank: 10th
  - Density: 350/sq mi (134/km^{2})
- Time zone: UTC+0 (GMT)
  - Summer (DST): UTC+1 (BST)
- Postcode areas: BT
- Dialling codes: 028
- ISO 3166 code: GB-MEA
- GSS code: N09000008
- Website: midandeastantrim.gov.uk

Mid and East Antrim is a local government district in Northern Ireland. The district was created on 1 April 2015 by merging the Borough of Ballymena, the Borough of Larne and the Borough of Carrickfergus. The local authority is Mid and East Antrim Borough Council.

== Geography ==
The district is wholly located in County Antrim, and stretches from the River Bann in the west to the Antrim Coast, taking in the southern part of the Antrim Coast and Glens Area of Outstanding Natural Beauty, as well as the major towns of Ballymena and Carrickfergus, and the important port of Larne. The district had a population of 139,913 in 2024. The name of the new district was announced on 17 September 2008.

== History ==
Mid and East Antrim Borough Council replaced Ballymena Borough Council, Carrickfergus Borough Council and Larne Borough Council. The first election for the new district council was originally due to take place in May 2009, but in April 2008, Shaun Woodward, Secretary of State for Northern Ireland announced that the scheduled 2009 district council elections were to be postponed until 2011. The first elections took place on 22 May 2014 and the council acted as a shadow authority until 1 April 2015.

== Freedom of the Borough ==
The following people and military units have received the Freedom of the Borough of Mid and East Antrim.

=== Individuals ===
- Joan Christie: 21 April 2018
- Sir William Wright: 18 January 2019
- Jonathan Rea: November 2020

=== Military units ===
- "B" Squadron Scottish and North Irish Yeomanry: 31 January 2016

== See also ==
- Local government in Northern Ireland
