= Reform of local government in Northern Ireland =

Reform of local government in Northern Ireland saw the replacement of the twenty-six districts created in 1973 with a smaller number of "super districts". The review process began in 2002, with proposals for either seven or eleven districts made before it was suspended in 2010. On 12 March 2012, the Northern Ireland Executive published its programme for government, which included a commitment to reduce the number of councils in Northern Ireland to 11. The first elections to these new councils were on 22 May 2014.

26 councils reduced to 11 in April 2015

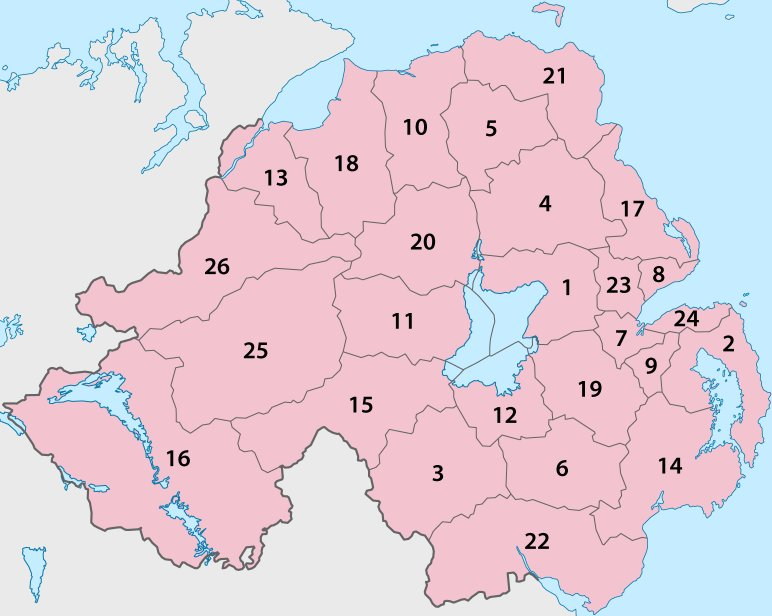
The 26 old districts

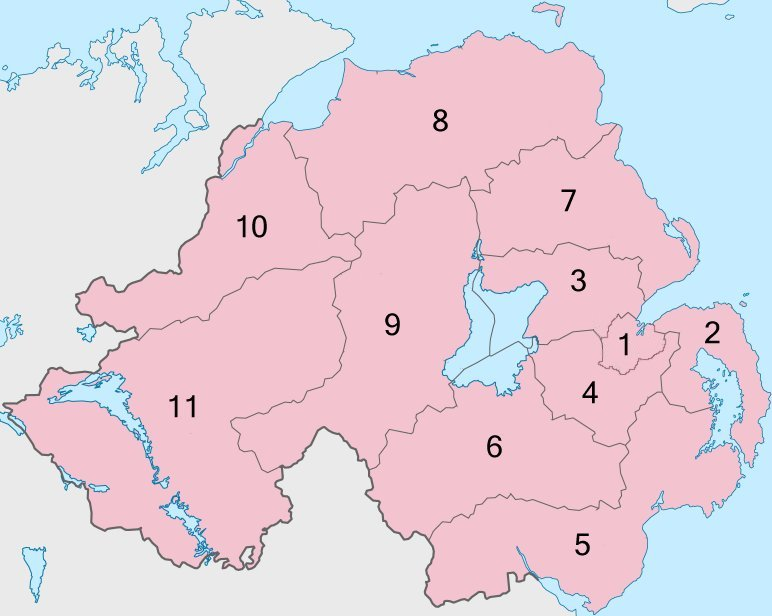
The 11 new districts

== Background ==
Compared to unitary authorities in England, the Northern Ireland districts had small populations, with an average of about 65,000. In June 2002 the Northern Ireland Executive established a Review of Public Administration to review the arrangements for the accountability, development, administration and delivery of public services. Among its recommendations were a reduction in the number of districts.

=== Situation before reform process ===
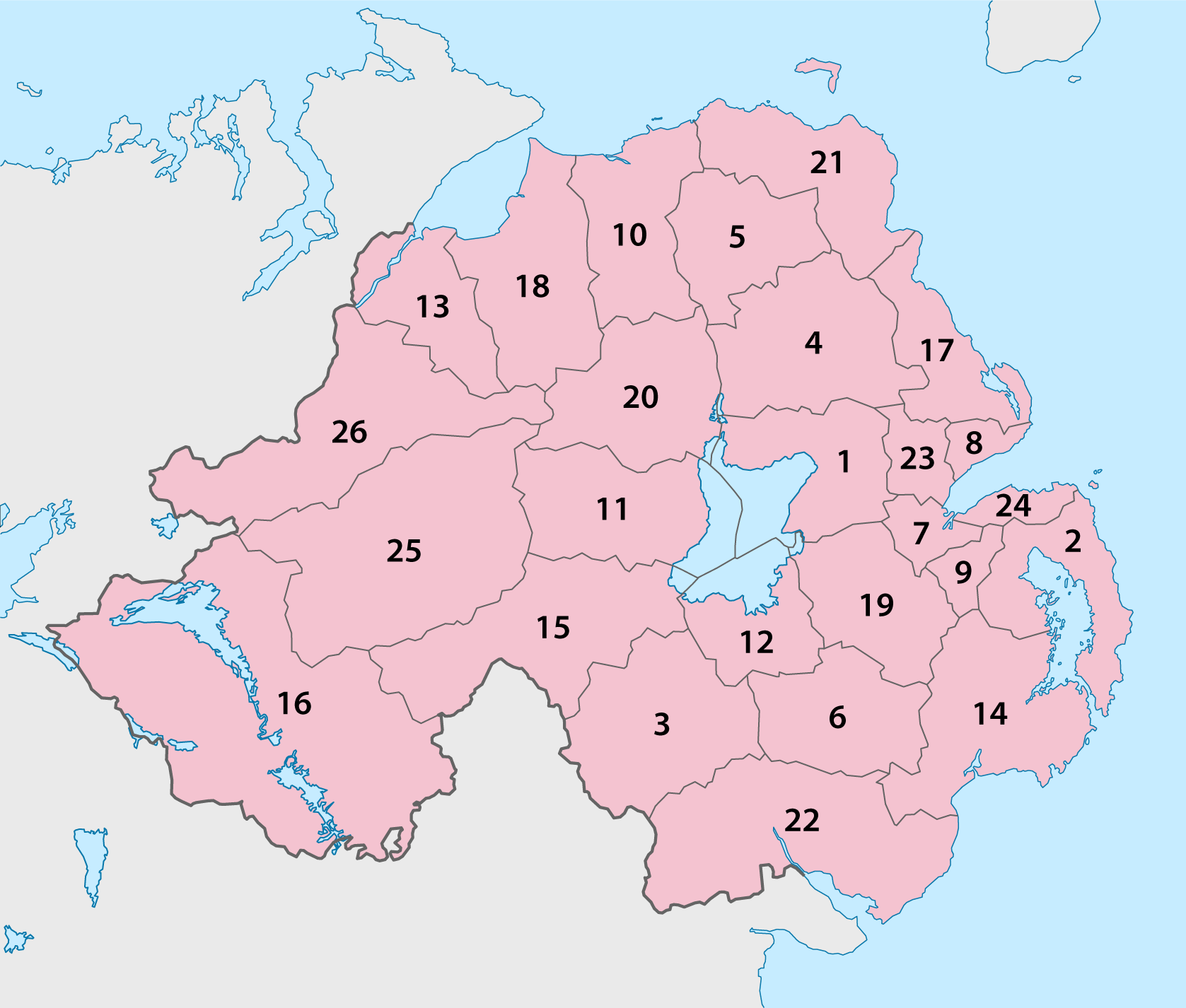
Districts

There were 26 districts, each with a district council, which were created in 1973.

District	Council	No. on map
Antrim	Antrim Borough Council	1
Ards	Ards Borough Council	2
Armagh	Armagh City and District Council	3
Ballymena	Ballymena Borough Council	4
Ballymoney	Ballymoney Borough Council	5
Banbridge	Banbridge District Council	6
Belfast	Belfast City Council	7
Carrickfergus	Carrickfergus Borough Council	8
Castlereagh	Castlereagh Borough Council	9
Coleraine	Coleraine Borough Council	10
Cookstown	Cookstown District Council	11
Craigavon	Craigavon Borough Council	12
Derry	Derry City Council	13
Down	Down District Council	14
Dungannon and South Tyrone	Dungannon and South Tyrone Borough Council	15
Fermanagh	Fermanagh District Council	16
Larne	Larne Borough Council	17
Limavady	Limavady Borough Council	18
Lisburn	Lisburn City Council	19
Magherafelt	Magherafelt District Council	20
Moyle	Moyle District Council	21
Newry and Mourne	Newry and Mourne District Council	22
Newtownabbey	Newtownabbey Borough Council	23
North Down	North Down Borough Council	24
Omagh	Omagh District Council	25
Strabane	Strabane District Council	26

== First scheme: seven districts ==
On 22 November 2005 Peter Hain, the Secretary of State for Northern Ireland, announced proposals to reduce the number of councils to seven.

The new authorities were to have a number of new powers in such areas as planning, local roads functions, regeneration, and fostering community relations, which were to be transferred from the existing joint boards and other bodies, that are much closer in size to the proposed local authorities. Legislation was to be introduced to prevent serving councillors also being Members of the Northern Ireland Assembly (the so-called dual mandate that was also recently abolished in the Republic of Ireland).

Initial reaction from Northern Ireland's political parties, except for Sinn Féin, was hostile, emphasising the reduction in local representation and frequently expressing a fear that the region would be carved up on sectarian lines. Three councils would have had substantial Ulster Protestant majorities, while three would have had Catholic majorities, with Belfast very nearly equally balanced. Former Secretary of State for Northern Ireland, Paul Murphy, criticised the proposals as too severe.

The Local Government (Boundaries) (Northern Ireland) Order 2006 was made on 9 May 2006 providing for the appointment of a Local Government Boundaries Commissioner to recommend the boundaries and names of the seven districts and then to divide the districts into wards. Dick Mackenzie was appointed as Commissioner on 1 July 2006.

The commissioner announced his provisional recommendations on 7 November 2006:

	Name	Area	Map of 7 proposed districts
1.	Belfast	as present, plus Belvoir, Braniel, Castlereagh (not the borough), Cregagh, Gilnahirk, Glencregagh, Merok, Tullycarnet and Wynchurch (all from Castlereagh) and Colin Glen, Dunmurry, Kilwee, Lagmore, Poleglass and Twinbrook (all from Lisburn)	
2.	North East	Ballymena, Ballymoney, Coleraine (apart from Benone Strand), Larne (minus Whitehead Golf Club) and Moyle	
3.	Inner East	Antrim, Carrickfergus, Lisburn (apart from Colin Glen, Dunmurry, Kilwee, Lagmore, Poleglass and Twinbrook) and Newtownabbey plus the rest of Whitehead Golf Club	
4.	East	Down, Ards, Castlereagh (apart from Belvoir, Braniel, Castlereagh, Cregagh, Gilnahirk, Glencregagh, Merok, Tullycarnet and Wynchurch), North Down	
5.	South	Armagh, Banbridge, Craigavon, Newry and Mourne	
6.	North West	Derry, Limavady, Magherafelt, Strabane plus the rest of Benone Strand.	
7.	West	Cookstown, Dungannon and South Tyrone, Fermanagh, Omagh	

An eight-week public consultation period on the proposals, during which members of the public could make written submissions, ended on 5 January 2007. Public hearings conducted by assistant commissioners were held in January and February 2007. The assistant commissioners issued reports on the results of the hearings, and the commissioner published revised recommendations on 30 March 2007. There were only minor changes to the original scheme. The most controversial aspects of the proposed reform were the names of the new districts.

== Second scheme: eleven districts ==
In June 2007, following the restoration of a power-sharing Executive, it became clear that the plan to create seven "super-councils" was to be reviewed, if not abandoned. The following month, in July 2007, Arlene Foster, Minister for the Environment in the Executive, announced a review. A committee was established to report by the end of 2007.

On 13 March 2008 the Executive agreed on proposals brought forward by Environment Minister Arlene Foster to create 11 new councils instead of the original 7. The 2 UUP ministers voted against the proposals as their party favoured 15 councils, however the proposals passed by 7 votes to 2.

The areas of the eleven proposed councils were to consist of combinations of existing districts as follows:

	Name	Population	Area	Map of the 11 proposed districts
1.	Belfast City	333,871	Belfast City Council plus parts of Castlereagh, Lisburn and North Down	
2.	North Down and Ards District	156,672	Ards and North Down, except for a small part of the Knocknagoney area of North Down District which was to be transferred to Belfast	
3.	Antrim and Newtownabbey District	138,567	Antrim and Newtownabbey	
4.	Lisburn City and Castlereagh District	134,841	Lisburn and Castlereagh, though with the transfer of "the localities of Gilnahirk, Tullycarnet, Braniel, Castlereagh, Merok, Cregagh, Wynchurch, Glencregagh and Belvoir, Collin Glen, Poleglass, Lagmore, Twinbrook, Kilwee and Dunmurry" to Belfast	
5.	Newry City, Mourne and Down District	171,533	Newry and Mourne and Down together with half of Slieve Croob	
6.	Armagh City, Banbridge and Craigavon District	199,693	Armagh City and District, Banbridge and Craigavon, though with the loss of half of Slieve Croob to Newry City and Down District	
7.	Mid and East Antrim District	135,338	Ballymena, Larne, and Carrickfergus	
8.	Causeway Coast and Glens District	140,877	Ballymoney, Coleraine, Limavady and Moyle	
9.	Mid-Ulster District	138,590	Magherafelt, Cookstown and Dungannon and South Tyrone	
10.	Derry City and Strabane District	147,720	Derry and Strabane.	
11.	Fermanagh and Omagh District	113,161	Fermanagh and Omagh	

On 25 April 2008, Shaun Woodward, Secretary of State for Northern Ireland announced that the scheduled 2009 district council elections were to be postponed until the introduction of the eleven new councils in 2011. The names of the new districts were announced on 17 September 2008 with revised names recommended on 27 February 2009.

A legal framework for the creation of the 11 new District Councils was put into place with the passing of the Local Government (Boundaries) Act (Northern Ireland) 2008 by the Northern Ireland Assembly in May 2008. This act repeals the Local Government (Boundaries) Act (Northern Ireland) 1971 which established the 26 districts used in 1973–2015.

== Suspension ==
In May 2010 it emerged that the process of bringing the new authorities into existence was likely to be delayed, due to the failure of members of the Northern Ireland Executive to agree on boundaries for district electoral areas. The main issue was the inclusion of Dunmurry within the city boundaries of Belfast rather than Lisburn City and Castlereagh. Edwin Poots, Northern Ireland Minister of the Environment, opposed the extension of Belfast, while Sinn Féin members of the executive favoured it. The Northern Ireland Office made it clear that unless the dispute was speedily resolved, elections due in May 2011 would be to the existing 26 district councils.

A decision to delay changes until 2015 was expected to be announced on 13 May 2010, but was postponed, reportedly due to disagreements between Poots and Sammy Wilson, the Executive's Minister of Finance and Personnel. On 15 June 2010, the proposed reforms were abandoned following the failure of the Northern Ireland Executive to obtain cross community support. Ministers from the Social Democratic and Labour Party (SDLP), Sinn Féin and Alliance Party voted in favour of the reforms, Democratic Unionist Party ministers voted against and Ulster Unionist Party ministers abstained. Accordingly, elections to the existing 26 councils took place in 2011.

The president of the Northern Ireland Local Government Association noted that "Local Government Reform will not take place at all, with no notification that it is simply put off to 2015 which was one of the options the Minister was to put forward to the Executive", and angrily denounced the decision as "clearly not acceptable on any level".

== Programme for Government 2011–2015 ==
After the 2011 elections, the new executive drew up a programme for government for the assembly's four-year term, which was published on 12 March 2012. Under "Priority 5: Delivering High Quality and Efficient Public Services", one commitment was "Establish the new 11 council model for Local Government by 2015", under the responsibility of the Department of the Environment. The milestones laid down for this are:

2012/13
Progress legislation (to include Local Government Reorganisation Act) and a programme structure necessary to manage change
2013/14
Arrangements in place for the shadow Councils. Deliver Year 2 of implementation programme
2014/15
Arrangements in place for the transfer of powers to councils

A draft Local Government (Boundaries) Order (Northern Ireland) 2012 was published, specifying eleven districts with names and boundaries similar to the previous proposal. On 12 June 2012, the Northern Ireland Assembly approved the draft Order by 59 votes to 26; the DUP, Sinn Féin, and the Alliance Party voted for, while the Ulster Unionist Party and the SDLP voted against. The Order (2012 No. 421) was made on 30 November 2012.

== Legislation ==
=== Licensing of Pavement Cafés Act (Northern Ireland) 2014 ===
Licensing of Pavement Cafés Act (Northern Ireland) 2014
- Act of the Northern Ireland Assembly
- Northern Ireland Assembly
- Long title: An Act to make provision for the regulation by district councils of the placing on public areas of furniture for use for the consumption of food or drink.
- Citation: 2014 c. 9 (N.I.)
- Introduced by: Nelson McCausland, Minister for Social Development

Dates
- Royal assent: 12 May 2014

Status: Current legislation

The Licensing of Pavement Cafés Act (Northern Ireland) 2014 (c. 9 (N.I.) gave district councils the power to grant permission for restaurant owners to place chairs and tables in public places.

=== Off-street Parking (Functions of District Councils) Act (Northern Ireland) 2015 ===
Off-street Parking (Functions of District Councils) Act (Northern Ireland) 2015
- Act of the Northern Ireland Assembly
- Northern Ireland Assembly
- Long title: An Act to transfer to district councils certain functions in relation to off-street parking places; and for connected purposes.
- Citation: 2015 c. 3 (N.I.)
- Introduced by: Danny Kennedy, Minister for Regional Development

Dates
- Royal assent: 12 March 2015

Status: Current legislation

The Off-street Parking (Functions of District Councils) Act (Northern Ireland) 2015 (c. 3 (N.I.)) gave district councils the power to manage the off-street parking.

== See also ==
- 2014 Northern Ireland local elections
