= Newry and Mourne Area E =

District electoral areas in Newry and Mourne, Northern Ireland

Newry and Mourne Area E was one of the six district electoral areas in Newry and Mourne, Northern Ireland which existed from 1973 to 1985. The district elected six members to Newry and Mourne District Council, and formed part of the Armagh constituencies for the Northern Ireland Assembly and UK Parliament.

It was created for the 1973 local elections, and contained the wards of Belleek, Camlough, Creggan, Crossmaglen, Forkhill and Newtownhamilton. It was abolished for the 1985 local elections and replaced by The Fews DEA and Slieve Gullion DEA.

== Councillors ==
Election	Councillor (Party)	Councillor (Party)	Councillor (Party)	Councillor (Party)	Councillor (Party)	Councillor (Party)
1981	James Savage (SDLP)	Owen Kelly (SDLP)	Pat Toner (SDLP)	Jim Murphy (IIP)/ (Independent Nationalist)/ (SDLP)	James Lynch (Anti H-Block)	Anthony Watters (Anti H-Block)
1977	James Savage (SDLP)	Owen Kelly (SDLP)	Pat Toner (SDLP)	Jim Murphy (IIP)/ (Independent Nationalist)/ (SDLP)	Peter McMahon (SDLP)	Sean McCreesh (Independent Republican)
1973	Caroline Donaldson (Independent Unionist)	Bernard McKeown (Republican Clubs)	Pat Toner (SDLP)	Jim Murphy (IIP)/ (Independent Nationalist)/ (SDLP)	Peter McMahon (SDLP)	Sean McCreesh (Independent Republican)

== 1981 Election ==
1977: 4 x SDLP, 1 x Independent Nationalist, 1 x Independent Republican

1981: 3 x SDLP, 2 x Anti H-Block, 1 x IIP

1977-1981 Change: Anti H-Block (two seats) gain from SDLP and Independent Republican, Independent Nationalist joins IIP

Newry and Mourne Area E - 6 seats
Party	Candidate	FPv%	Count									
Party	Candidate	FPv%	1	2	3	4	5	6	7	8	9	10
Anti H-Block	James Lynch	17.85%	1,244									
SDLP	Pat Toner*	13.27%	925	936.34	940.39	940.39	952.81	1,070.81				
Anti H-Block	Anthony Watters	12.22%	852	887.91	892.96	892.96	993.71	1,022.71				
SDLP	James Savage*	10.88%	758	771.44	804.43	804.43	833.58	986.25	1,018.59			
SDLP	Owen Kelly*	8.18%	570	575.04	577.25	585.25	619.72	726.24	753.19	767.19	786.66	881.33
Irish Independence	Jim Murphy*	6.41%	447	514.2	551.29	552.29	614.2	651.24	653.55	656.55	657.73	935.9
UUP	Elizabeth McDowell	7.60%	530	530.21	530.21	723.21	724.21	730.21	730.21	730.21	730.21	740.21
Ind. Republican	Sean McCreesh*	7.62%	531	552.21	557.26	557.26	576.83	621.71	634.8	637.8	639.57	
SDLP	Peter McMahon*	7.65%	533	561.14	565.61	566.61	576.71					
Ind. Republican	Brian Woods	3.47%	242	288.41	292.41	292.41						
DUP	Alex Chambers	3.66%	255	255.42	255.42							
Irish Independence	Sean Reavey	1.19%	83	98.54								
Electorate: 9,237 Valid: 6,970 (75.46%) Spoilt: 242 Quota: 996 Turnout: 7,212 (78.08%)

== 1977 Election ==
1973: 3 x SDLP, 1 x Republican Clubs, 1 x Independent Republican, 1 x Independent Unionist

1977: 4 x SDLP, 1 x Independent Nationalist, 1 x Independent Republican

1973-1977 Change: SDLP (two seats) gain from Republican Clubs and Independent Unionist, Independent Nationalist leaves SDLP

Newry and Mourne Area E - 6 seats
Party	Candidate	FPv%	Count					
Party	Candidate	FPv%	1	2	3	4	5	6
SDLP	Pat Toner*	18.61%	948					
SDLP	Peter McMahon*	15.84%	807					
SDLP	James Savage	15.41%	785					
Ind. Republican	Sean McCreesh*	12.41%	632	707.75	718.5	764.5		
SDLP	Owen Kelly	11.21%	571	677.5	699	756		
Ind. Nationalist	Jim Murphy*	8.66%	441	460	467	572.25	645.69	687.81
UUP	Caroline Donaldson*	11.27%	574	574.5	591.75	595	600.44	613.4
Republican Clubs	Seamus Murphy	5.28%	269	283	284			
Alliance	John Magowan	1.32%	67	69				
Electorate: 9,174 Valid: 5,094 (55.53%) Spoilt: 284 Quota: 728 Turnout: 5,378 (58.62%)

== 1973 Election ==
1973: 3 x SDLP, 1 x Republican Clubs, 1 x Independent Unionist, 1 x Independent Republican

Newry and Mourne Area E - 6 seats
Party	Candidate	FPv%	Count						
Party	Candidate	FPv%	1	2	3	4	5	6	7
Ind. Unionist	Caroline Donaldson	19.06%	720						
SDLP	Peter McMahon	13.92%	526	526	529	550			
Ind. Republican	Sean McCreesh	13.23%	500	504.6	510.6	541.6			
SDLP	Pat Toner	9.16%	346	346.46	349.46	365.46	368.16	442.62	536.62
SDLP	Jim Murphy	8.42%	318	318.92	332.92	343.38	345.18	434.08	541.08
Republican Clubs	Bernard McKeown	7.91%	299	300.38	309.38	441.84	443.64	473.64	499.64
Alliance	John Magowan	5.29%	200	362.38	362.38	366.84	368.64	403.32	462.32
SDLP	James McPartland	7.57%	286	286.92	289.92	310.38	311.28	356.2	
SDLP	Owen Kelly	7.23%	273	279.9	281.9	298.9	299.8		
Republican Clubs	Michael Rafferty	3.94%	149	149.92	163.92				
Republican Clubs	Joseph Daly	2.57%	97	98.38	105.38				
Republican Clubs	Oliver Toner	1.69%	64	64					
Electorate: 8,870 Valid: 3,778 (42.59%) Spoilt: 112 Quota: 540 Turnout: 3,890 (43.86%)
