= 1981 Newry and Mourne District Council election =

Local govt election in Northern Ireland

← 1977	20 May 1981	1985 →

All 30 seats to Newry and Mourne District Council 16 seats needed for a majority
	First party	Second party	Third party
Party	SDLP	UUP	Irish Independence
Seats won	16	6	4
Seat change	▲1	▼1	▲4
	Fourth party	Fifth party	Sixth party
Party	DUP	Anti H-Block	Alliance
Seats won	2	2	0
Seat change	▲1	▲2	▼3
	Seventh party	Eighth party
Party	Ind. Nationalist	Ind. Republican
Seats won	0	0
Seat change	▼3	▼1

Elections to Newry and Mourne District Council were held on 20 May 1981 on the same day as the other Northern Irish local government elections. The election used six district electoral areas to elect a total of 30 councillors.

== Election results ==
Newry and Mourne District Council Election Result 1981
Party	Seats	Gains	Losses	Net gain/loss	Seats %	Votes %	Votes	+/−
SDLP	16	2	1	▲1	53.3	41.7	14,397	▼5.2
UUP	6	0	1	▼1	20.0	18.7	6,460	▼5.8
Irish Independence	4	4	0	▲4	13.3	11.4	3,944	New
DUP	2	1	0	0	6.7	9.5	3,291	▲6.4
Anti H-Block	2	2	0	▲2	6.7	6.1	2,096	New
Alliance	0	0	3	▼3	0.0	3.6	1,240	▼4.7
Ind. Nationalist	0	0	3	▼3	0.0	3.1	1,059	▼4.5
Ind. Republican	0	0	1	▼1	0.0	1.5	531	▼0.7
Republican Clubs	0	0	0	0	0.0	2.0	682	▼3.1
Independent	0	0	0	0	0.0	1.6	535	▼0.7
Independent Labour	0	0	0	0	0.0	0.1	33	▲0.1

Note: "Votes" are the first preference votes.

== Districts summary ==
Results of the Newry and Mourne District Council election, 1981 by district
Ward	%	Cllrs	%	Cllrs	%	Cllrs	%	Cllrs	%	Cllrs	%	Cllrs	Total Cllrs
Ward	SDLP		UUP		IIP		DUP		Anti H-Block		Others		Total Cllrs
Area A	31.9	2	35.4	2	0.0	0	23.1	1	0.0	0	9.6	0	5
Area B	64.0	4	8.9	0	8.5	0	2.8	0	0.0	0	15.8	0	4
Area C	40.0	2	26.0	1	0.0	0	22.2	1	0.0	0	11.8	0	4
Area D	37.1	3	19.1	2	25.8	2	3.9	0	0.0	0	14.1	0	7
Area E	40.0	3	7.6	0	7.6	1	3.7	0	30.1	2	11.0	0	6
Area F	43.4	2	16.2	1	21.6	1	5.6	0	0.0	0	13.2	0	6
Total	41.7	16	18.7	6	11.4	4	9.5	2	6.1	2	12.6	0	30

== Districts results ==
=== Area A ===
1977: 2 x UUP, 2 x SDLP, 1 x DUP
1981: 2 x UUP, 2 x SDLP, 1 x DUP
1977-1981 Change: No change

Newry and Mourne Area A - 5 seats
Party	Candidate	FPv%	Count			
Party	Candidate	FPv%	1	2	3	4
SDLP	Colum Murnion	21.60%	1,346			
DUP	George Graham*	20.29%	1,264			
UUP	William Russell*	18.54%	1,155			
UUP	Arthur Coulter*	16.88%	1,052			
SDLP	Anne Marie Cunningham*	10.26%	639	899.13	901.13	941.13
Ind. Nationalist	Arthur Doran	9.63%	600	643.01	653.24	720.24
DUP	Robert McConnell	2.81%	175	175.23		
Electorate: 8,729 Valid: 6,231 (71.38%) Spoilt: 212 Quota: 1,039 Turnout: 6,443 (73.81%)

=== Area B ===
1977: 2 x SDLP, 1 x Alliance, 1 x Independent Nationalist
1981: 4 x SDLP
1977-1981 Change: SDLP (two seats) gain from Alliance and Independent Nationalist

Newry and Mourne Area B - 4 seats
Party	Candidate	FPv%	Count					
Party	Candidate	FPv%	1	2	3	4	5	6
SDLP	P. J. Bradley	22.27%	1,084					
SDLP	Jim McCart*	17.40%	847	883.5	886.5	974.5		
SDLP	Liam Trainor*	12.23%	595	611.5	617.5	642.4	758.7	804.7
SDLP	Brian Mulligan	12.10%	589	612.7	612.7	624.9	721.1	742.4
Ind. Nationalist	Anthony Williamson*	9.43%	459	462.3	468.3	519.5	638.3	720.3
UUP	William McCoy	8.90%	433	433	434	614	620.5	
Irish Independence	Joe Kearney	8.47%	412	433.3	436.3	469.3		
Alliance	Eithne Doran	3.58%	174	175.8	177.8			
DUP	Raymond Hanna	2.77%	135	135.2	135.2			
Independent	Peter Maloy	2.18%	106	106.5	112.5			
Independent Labour	Johnny Ward	0.68%	33	33				
Electorate: 6,919 Valid: 4,867 (70.34%) Spoilt: 182 Quota: 974 Turnout: 5,049 (72.97%)

=== Area C ===
1977: 2 x SDLP, 2 x UUP
1981: 2 x SDLP, 1 x UUP, 1 x DUP
1977-1981 Change: DUP gain from UUP

Newry and Mourne Area C - 4 seats
Party	Candidate	FPv%	Count				
Party	Candidate	FPv%	1	2	3	4	5
SDLP	Nan Sands*	24.94%	1,014				
DUP	William Sterritt	22.16%	901				
SDLP	Patrick Harper	15.03%	611	641	817.61		
UUP	Violet Cromie*	15.05%	612	628	629.68	683.68	719.99
UUP	Annie Copeland	10.97%	446	463	463.21	493.41	507.67
Independent	James Fagan	9.71%	395	410	429.74	429.74	
Alliance	Violet Watts	2.14%	87				
Electorate: 5,648 Valid: 4,066 (71.99%) Spoilt: 132 Quota: 814 Turnout: 4,198 (74.33%)

=== Area D ===
1977: 3 x SDLP, 2 x UUP, 1 x Alliance, 1 x Independent Nationalist
1981: 3 x SDLP, 2 x UUP, 2 x IIP
1977-1981 Change: IIP gain from Alliance, Independent Nationalist joins IIP

Newry and Mourne Area D - 7 seats
Party	Candidate	FPv%	Count								
Party	Candidate	FPv%	1	2	3	4	5	6	7	8	9
Irish Independence	Eugene Markey*	23.56%	1,831								
SDLP	John McEvoy*	12.72%	988								
UUP	Andy Moffett*	10.36%	805	808.43	808.43	1,017.43					
SDLP	Thomas McGrath*	8.07%	627	735.29	749.23	751.72	806.44	806.44	1,201.44		
SDLP	John Bell*	8.55%	664	745.83	772.75	774.24	814	814	938.9	1,148.9	
UUP	Clarence Morrow*	8.69%	675	676.47	676.47	756.47	761.96	810.68	812.17	812.17	814.27
Irish Independence	Francis McCamley	2.15%	167	681.99	705.4	707.38	753.08	753.08	774.98	781.98	804.38
Alliance	Victor Frizell*	7.57%	588	621.81	632.79	635.79	695.2	695.68	733.13	748.53	774.43
SDLP	Michael McNulty	7.62%	592	611.6	622.6	622.6	633.05	633.05			
Republican Clubs	Brian Mulligan	3.69%	287	351.68	452.58	452.58					
DUP	George McConnell	3.90%	303	306.43	306.43						
Republican Clubs	Matthew Cunningham	2.61%	203	222.6							
Electorate: 11,891 Valid: 7,770 (65.34%) Spoilt: 280 Quota: 967 Turnout: 5,010 (42.13%)

=== Area E ===
1977: 4 x SDLP, 1 x Independent Nationalist, 1 x Independent Republican
1981: 3 x SDLP, 2 x Anti H-Block, 1 x IIP
1977-1981 Change: Anti H-Block (two seats) gain from SDLP and Independent Republican, Independent Nationalist joins IIP

Newry and Mourne Area E - 6 seats
Party	Candidate	FPv%	Count									
Party	Candidate	FPv%	1	2	3	4	5	6	7	8	9	10
Anti H-Block	James Lynch	17.85%	1,244									
SDLP	Pat Toner*	13.27%	925	936.34	940.39	940.39	952.81	1,070.81				
Anti H-Block	Anthony Watters	12.22%	852	887.91	892.96	892.96	993.71	1,022.71				
SDLP	James Savage*	10.88%	758	771.44	804.43	804.43	833.58	986.25	1,018.59			
SDLP	Owen Kelly*	8.18%	570	575.04	577.25	585.25	619.72	726.24	753.19	767.19	786.66	881.33
Irish Independence	Jim Murphy*	6.41%	447	514.2	551.29	552.29	614.2	651.24	653.55	656.55	657.73	935.9
UUP	Elizabeth McDowell	7.60%	530	530.21	530.21	723.21	724.21	730.21	730.21	730.21	730.21	740.21
Ind. Republican	Sean McCreesh*	7.62%	531	552.21	557.26	557.26	576.83	621.71	634.8	637.8	639.57	
SDLP	Peter McMahon*	7.65%	533	561.14	565.61	566.61	576.71					
Ind. Republican	Brian Woods	3.47%	242	288.41	292.41	292.41						
DUP	Alex Chambers	3.66%	255	255.42	255.42							
Irish Independence	Sean Reavey	1.19%	83	98.54								
Electorate: 9,237 Valid: 6,970 (75.46%) Spoilt: 242 Quota: 996 Turnout: 7,212 (78.08%)

=== Area F ===
1977: 2 x SDLP, 1 x UUP, 1 x Alliance
1981: 2 x SDLP, 1 x UUP, 1 x IIP
1977-1981 Change: IIP gain from Alliance

Newry and Mourne Area F - 4 seats
Party	Candidate	FPv%	Count								
Party	Candidate	FPv%	1	2	3	4	5	6	7	8	9
UUP	William McCaigue*	16.19%	752	752	754	755	979				
SDLP	Arthur Ruddy*	18.81%	874	879	893	914	914	915.06	941.06		
Irish Independence	Freddie Kearns	10.31%	479	487	492	518	520	520	642	900	932
SDLP	Patrick McElroy	14.33%	666	670	676	690	690	693.18	702.18	732.18	862.42
SDLP	Louis McGuigan	10.22%	475	477	482	492	492	493.06	545.06	562.06	637.65
Alliance	Michael McVerry*	6.59%	306	310	354	365	376	419.46	421.46	424.46	
Irish Independence	Kevin McAleenan	5.96%	277	281	281	296	300	300	339		
Irish Independence	P. J. McCann	5.34%	248	249	254	268	270	270			
DUP	Gordon Heslip	5.55%	258	258	258	258					
Republican Clubs	Edward McKeown	2.26%	105	105	105						
Republican Clubs	Michael McLoughlin	1.87%	87	89	90						
Alliance	Edward Turley	1.83%	85	86							
Independent	James Malone	0.73%	34								
Electorate: 7,263 Valid: 4,646 (63.97%) Spoilt: 187 Quota: 930 Turnout: 4,833 (66.54%)
