= 1977 Newry and Mourne District Council election =

Local govt election in Northern Ireland

← 1973	18 May 1977	1981 →

All 30 seats to Newry and Mourne District Council 16 seats needed for a majority
	First party	Second party	Third party
Party	SDLP	UUP	Alliance
Seats won	15	7	3
Seat change	▲2	▲4	▼1
	Fourth party	Fifth party	Sixth party
Party	DUP	Ind. Nationalist	Ind. Republican
Seats won	1	3	1
Seat change	▲1	▲1	Steady
	Seventh party	Eighth party
Party	Ind. Unionist	Republican Clubs
Seats won	0	0
Seat change	▼5	▼2

Elections to Newry and Mourne District Council were held on 18 May 1977 on the same day as the other Northern Irish local government elections. The election used six district electoral areas to elect a total of 30 councillors.

== Election results ==
Newry and Mourne District Council Election Result 1977
Party	Seats	Gains	Losses	Net gain/loss	Seats %	Votes %	Votes	+/−
SDLP	15	2	0	▲2	50.0	46.9	13,538	▲11.6
UUP	7	5	1	▲4	23.3	24.5	7,078	▲11.6
Alliance	3	0	1	▼1	10.0	8.3	2,382	▼5.2
Ind. Nationalist	3	2	1	▲1	10.0	7.6	2,194	▼3.3
DUP	1	1	0	Steady	3.3	3.1	884	New
Ind. Republican	1	0	0	Steady	0.0	2.2	632	▼0.8
Republican Clubs	0	0	2	▼2	0.0	5.1	1,477	▼5.7
Independent	0	0	0	Steady	0.0	2.3	676	▼0.7

Note: "Votes" are the first preference votes.

== Districts summary ==
Results of the Newry and Mourne District Council election, 1977 by district
Ward	%	Cllrs	%	Cllrs	%	Cllrs	%	Cllrs	%	Cllrs	Total Cllrs
Ward	SDLP		UUP		Alliance		DUP		Others		Total Cllrs
Area A	33.2	2	32.4	2	2.2	0	15.8	1	16.4	0	5
Area B	50.0	2	11.6	0	17.9	1	0.0	0	20.5	1	4
Area C	48.2	2	47.0	2	0.0	0	0.0	0	4.8	0	4
Area D	44.2	3	25.5	2	9.5	1	0.0	0	20.8	1	7
Area E	61.1	4	11.3	0	1.3	0	0.0	0	26.3	2	6
Area F	47.7	2	23.4	1	19.9	1	0.0	0	9.0	0	6
Total	46.9	15	24.5	7	8.3	3	3.1	1	17.2	4	30

== Districts results ==
=== Area A ===
1973: 3 x UUP, 2 x SDLP, 1 x Independent Nationalist
1977: 2 x UUP, 2 x SDLP, 1 x DUP
1973-1977 Change: SDLP and DUP gain from UUP and Independent Nationalist

Newry and Mourne Area A - 5 seats
Party	Candidate	FPv%	Count					
Party	Candidate	FPv%	1	2	3	4	5	6
UUP	William Russell*	22.15%	1,238					
SDLP	Anne Marie Cunningham*	15.62%	873	873.25	894.5	1,081.5		
UUP	Arthur Coulter*	10.25%	573	793.5	806	806.25	806.25	1,037.25
DUP	George Graham	15.82%	884	910	910.5	911.5	912.34	945.34
SDLP	Frank MacCann	10.18%	569	569.75	585.75	763.75	892.27	910.27
Ind. Nationalist	Arthur Doran*	9.07%	507	509.75	538.5	588.5	607.82	687.82
Independent	John Henning	7.16%	400	450	484.25	485.25	485.25	
SDLP	Hugh Cunningham	7.48%	418	418.5	427.5			
Alliance	Doreen Leitch	2.27%	127	130.75				
Electorate: 8,225 Valid: 5,589 (67.95%) Spoilt: 292 Quota: 932 Turnout: 5,881 (71.50%)

=== Area B ===
1973: 2 x SDLP, 1 x Alliance, 1 x Independent Nationalist
1977: 2 x SDLP, 1 x Alliance, 1 x Independent Nationalist
1973-1977 Change: No change

Newry and Mourne Area B - 4 seats
Party	Candidate	FPv%	Count					
Party	Candidate	FPv%	1	2	3	4	5	6
SDLP	Jim McCart*	31.71%	1,377					
Alliance	Anthony Williamson*	15.93%	692	727.72	792	797.14	831.9	977.9
Ind. Nationalist	John McAteer*	15.82%	687	715.88	721.26	725.26	763.78	809.54
SDLP	Liam Trainor	8.24%	358	658.96	665.72	665.72	709.64	727.3
SDLP	Brian Mulligan	10.04%	436	528.34	531.62	533	563.56	570.22
UUP	William Gordon	7.83%	340	348.36	350.74	497.04	503.64	
Republican Clubs	Thomas Moore	4.72%	205	224	230.04	230.04		
UUP	James Thompson	3.78%	164	167.8	168.8			
Alliance	James McGowan	1.93%	84	93.5				
Electorate: 6,723 Valid: 4,343 (64.60%) Spoilt: 276 Quota: 869 Turnout: 4,619 (68.70%)

=== Area C ===
1973: 2 x SDLP, 2 x Independent Unionist
1977: 2 x SDLP, 2 x UUP
1973-1977 Change: UUP (two seats) gain from Independent Unionist (two seats)

Newry and Mourne Area C - 4 seats
Party	Candidate	FPv%	Count	
Party	Candidate	FPv%	1	2
UUP	Violet Cromie*	31.36%	1,075	
SDLP	Nan Sands*	26.90%	922	
SDLP	Patrick McAlinden	21.30%	730	
UUP	Edward Walsh	15.67%	537	921.18
Republican Clubs	Daniel Mussen	4.78%	164	167.8
Electorate: 5,658 Valid: 3,428 (60.59%) Spoilt: 245 Quota: 686 Turnout: 3,673 (64.92%)

=== Area D ===
1973: 3 x SDLP, 2 x Independent Unionist, 1 x Alliance, 1 x Republican Clubs
1977: 3 x SDLP, 2 x UUP, 1 x Alliance, 1 x Independent Nationalist
1973-1977 Change: UUP (two seats) and Independent Nationalist gain from Independent Unionist (two seats) and Republican Clubs

Newry and Mourne Area D - 7 seats
Party	Candidate	FPv%	Count								
Party	Candidate	FPv%	1	2	3	4	5	6	7	8	9
UUP	Clarence Morrow*	13.32%	845								
SDLP	John Bell*	12.86%	816								
UUP	Andy Moffett	12.20%	774	822.66							
SDLP	Thomas McGrath*	11.91%	756	756.06	756.3	760.3	765.7	796.7			
SDLP	John McEvoy*	11.11%	705	705	705.06	727.06	730.5	761.78	768.84	810.84	
Alliance	Victor Frizell*	7.85%	498	498.66	507.66	565.8	566.58	589.8	591.86	631.16	699.84
Ind. Nationalist	Eugene Markey	8.81%	559	559.06	559.06	562.06	562.56	564.58	575.6	661.72	684.98
Republican Clubs	Noel Collins*	5.23%	332	332	332	335	335.64	339.64	451.66	515.14	564.56
SDLP	John Grant	6.11%	388	388.12	388.54	389.6	392.92	435.04	438.08	467.26	
Independent	Fabian Boyle	4.35%	276	276	276.06	283.18	284.3	288.36	297.38		
Republican Clubs	Edward McGeown	2.36%	150	150	150	150.06	150.18	151.18			
SDLP	Patrick Sloan	2.24%	142	142.18	142.36	146.36	146.84				
Alliance	Monica Sweeney	1.65%	105	105.24	106.74						
Electorate: 11,390 Valid: 6,346 (55.72%) Spoilt: 343 Quota: 794 Turnout: 6,689 (58.73%)

=== Area E ===
1973: 3 x SDLP, 1 x Republican Clubs, 1 x Independent Republican, 1 x Independent Unionist
1977: 4 x SDLP, 1 x Independent Nationalist, 1 x Independent Republican
1973-1977 Change: SDLP (two seats) gain from Republican Clubs and Independent Unionist, Independent Nationalist leaves SDLP

Newry and Mourne Area E - 6 seats
Party	Candidate	FPv%	Count					
Party	Candidate	FPv%	1	2	3	4	5	6
SDLP	Pat Toner*	18.61%	948					
SDLP	Peter McMahon*	15.84%	807					
SDLP	James Savage	15.41%	785					
Ind. Republican	Sean McCreesh*	12.41%	632	707.75	718.5	764.5		
SDLP	Owen Kelly	11.21%	571	677.5	699	756		
Ind. Nationalist	Jim Murphy*	8.66%	441	460	467	572.25	645.69	687.81
UUP	Caroline Donaldson*	11.27%	574	574.5	591.75	595	600.44	613.4
Republican Clubs	Seamus Murphy	5.28%	269	283	284			
Alliance	John Magowan	1.32%	67	69				
Electorate: 9,174 Valid: 5,094 (55.53%) Spoilt: 284 Quota: 728 Turnout: 5,378 (58.62%)

=== Area F ===
1973: 2 x SDLP, 2 x Alliance
1977: 2 x SDLP, 1 x Alliance, 1 x UUP
1973-1977 Change: UUP gain from Alliance

Newry and Mourne Area F - 4 seats
Party	Candidate	FPv%	Count				
Party	Candidate	FPv%	1	2	3	4	5
UUP	William McCaigue	23.59%	958				
SDLP	Arthur Ruddy*	19.13%	777	777.87	851.87		
Alliance	Michael McVerry*	9.97%	405	485.33	513.33	516.23	813.55
SDLP	Daniel Hughes	14.63%	594	617.49	643.49	646.97	726.87
SDLP	William Feely	13.94%	566	567.45	624.45	643.01	722.52
Alliance	John McClelland	9.95%	404	440.83	499.83	513.17	
Republican Clubs	Alan Wadforth	8.79%	357	357			
Electorate: 7,173 Valid: 4,061 (56.62%) Spoilt: 234 Quota: 813 Turnout: 4,295 (59.88%)
