= 1973 Newry and Mourne District Council election =

Local govt election in Northern Ireland

30 May 1973	1977 →

All 30 seats to Newry and Mourne District Council 16 seats needed for a majority
	First party	Second party	Third party
Party	SDLP	Ind. Unionist	Alliance
Seats won	13	5	4
	Fourth party	Fifth party	Sixth party
Party	UUP	Republican Clubs	Ind. Nationalist
Seats won	3	2	2
	Seventh party
Party	Ind. Republican
Seats won	1

Elections to Newry and Mourne District Council were held on 30 May 1973 on the same day as the other Northern Irish local government elections. The election used six district electoral areas to elect a total of 30 councillors.

== Election results ==
Party	Seats	±	First Pref. votes	FPv%	±%
SDLP	13		10,291	35.3	
Ind. Unionist	5		4,412	15.1	
Alliance	4		3,939	13.5	
UUP	3		3,757	12.9	
Republican Clubs	2		3,160	10.8	
Ind. Nationalist	2		1,256	4.3	
Ind. Republican	1		881	3.0	
Independent	0		886	3.0	
Irish Labour	0		290	1.0	
Ulster Liberal	0		288	1.0	
Totals	30		29,160	100.0	—

== Districts summary ==
Results of the Newry and Mourne District Council election, 1973 by district
Ward	%	Cllrs	%	Cllrs	%	Cllrs	%	Cllrs	%	Cllrs	Total Cllrs
Ward	SDLP		Alliance		UUP		RC		Others		Total Cllrs
Area A	17.8	1	4.3	0	52.7	3	0.0	0	25.2	1	5
Area B	37.9	2	19.8	1	13.0	0	12.8	0	29.3	1	4
Area C	40.3	2	0.0	0	6.4	0	7.0	0	46.3	2	4
Area D	38.4	3	10.9	1	0.0	0	15.7	1	35.0	2	7
Area E	46.3	3	5.3	0	0.0	0	16.1	1	32.3	2	6
Area F	37.8	2	42.1	2	0.0	0	16.1	0	4.0	0	6
Total	35.3	13	13.5	4	12.9	3	10.8	2	27.5	8	30

== Districts results ==
=== Area A ===
1973: 3 x UUP, 2 x SDLP, 1 x Independent Nationalist

Newry and Mourne Area A - 5 seats
Party	Candidate	FPv%	Count										
Party	Candidate	FPv%	1	2	3	4	5	6	7	8	9	10	11
UUP	William Russell	20.86%	1,254										
UUP	Arthur Coulter	17.76%	1,068										
UUP	Norman Gordon	14.12%	849	1,088.4									
Ind. Nationalist	Arthur Doran	6.62%	398	399.2	401.4	405	408	427.2	439.2	473.8	562.6	684.6	889.2
SDLP	Anne Marie Cunningham	7.70%	463	463	463.2	463.2	470.2	505	545	561	637	808	877.4
SDLP	Hugh Cunningham	7.47%	449	449.2	450	450.4	452.4	467.4	548.4	566.4	648.4	743.8	775
Ulster Liberal	Stanley Archer	4.79%	288	293.2	318.8	352	355.8	361.8	363.8	483	520.2	556.6	
Ind. Republican	Paul O'Reilly	6.34%	381	381	381	381.8	385.8	400.8	408.8	417.2	498.2		
Independent	Michael Hardy	5.59%	336	336.2	338.2	341.4	348	357	368	397.4			
Alliance	Margaret Hall	2.56%	154	156.2	168.4	188.4	265.2	267.6	273.6				
SDLP	Patrick Murphy	2.68%	161	161	161	161.4	162.4	165.4					
Ind. Nationalist	Austin Crawford	1.80%	108	108	108.4	110	110						
Alliance	P. J. McKeown	1.71%	103	104.4	106.4	108							
Electorate: 8,589 Valid: 6,012 (70.00%) Spoilt: 118 Quota: 1,003 Turnout: 6,130 (71.37%)

=== Area B ===
1973: 2 x SDLP, 1 x Alliance, 1 x Independent Nationalist

Newry and Mourne Area B - 4 seats
Party	Candidate	FPv%	Count								
Party	Candidate	FPv%	1	2	3	4	5	6	7	8	9
SDLP	Jim McCart	21.99%	994								
Ind. Nationalist	John McAteer	16.59%	750	758.1	762.73	781.54	799.63	805.72	816.17	873.76	993.76
Alliance	Anthony Williamson	12.99%	587	592.4	595.4	602.12	631.39	641.66	800.1	825.24	852.59
SDLP	John Tinnelly	8.54%	386	398.69	401.69	427.2	432.32	454.65	457.83	645.71	759.4
UUP	William Gordon	12.96%	586	587.53	588.53	588.62	591.62	591.62	634.98	640.25	649.61
Republican Clubs	Gerard Burns	8.67%	392	395.96	428.14	435.77	452.77	562.31	563.4	586.18	
SDLP	Edward Byrne	4.65%	210	242.76	244.94	309.74	313.1	317.46	326.18		
Alliance	Roland Gordon	3.69%	167	170.24	170.24	175.42	231.42	231.42			
Republican Clubs	Gerald Sherry	2.88%	130	130.9	141.53	144.71	153.71				
Alliance	Michael Gallagher	3.10%	140	140.9	140.9	142.99					
SDLP	William Trainor	2.68%	121	138.01	140.1						
Republican Clubs	James McGivern	1.26%	57	58.71							
Electorate: 6,662 Valid: 4,520 (67.85%) Spoilt: 140 Quota: 905 Turnout: 4,660 (69.95%)

=== Area C ===
1973: 2 x SDLP, 2 x Independent Unionist

Newry and Mourne Area C - 4 seats
Party	Candidate	FPv%	Count					
Party	Candidate	FPv%	1	2	3	4	5	6
Ind. Unionist	David Little	27.02%	1,166					
Ind. Unionist	Violet Cromie	19.23%	830	1,118.08				
SDLP	Joseph Brannigan	16.33%	705	705.26	705.52	714.04	834.3	905.3
SDLP	Nan Sands	14.60%	630	630.78	631.82	634.82	667.82	710.82
SDLP	Finian Sands	9.36%	404	404	406.08	413.34	466.4	500.6
Alliance	David Crory	4.59%	198	206.32	285.1	357.48	365.48	
Republican Clubs	Daniel Mussen	4.26%	184	184.26	184.52	187.52		
Republican Clubs	Seamus Murray	2.78%	120	120.26	120.26	120.52		
Alliance	Violet Watts	1.83%	79	81.34	101.62			
Electorate: 6,477 Valid: 4,316 (66.64%) Spoilt: 111 Quota: 864 Turnout: 4,427 (68.35%)

=== Area D ===
1973: 3 x SDLP, 2 x Independent Unionist, 1 x Alliance, 1 x Republican Clubs

Newry and Mourne Area D - 7 seats
Party	Candidate	FPv%	Count															
Party	Candidate	FPv%	1	2	3	4	5	6	7	8	9	10	11	12	13	14	15	16
Ind. Unionist	Clarence Morrow	19.03%	1,297															
SDLP	John Bell	13.25%	903															
SDLP	John McEvoy	10.98%	748	748.34	758.34	763.44	765.44	767.44	774.44	785.44	837.89	860.89						
Ind. Unionist	Arthur Lockhart	5.85%	399	823.66	823.66	824.66	824.66	825.66	825.66	825.66	825.66	826.66	829.66	831.66	835	835	859	
SDLP	Thomas McGrath	4.80%	327	327	331.55	339.65	345.7	348.7	353.75	364.25	435.55	440.99	446.08	489.28	505.88	506.51	564.15	937.15
Alliance	Victor Frizell	5.46%	372	376.08	377.98	381.42	381.42	382.42	386.47	397.92	403.17	443.66	445.76	456.76	710.15	713.93	809.14	833.37
Republican Clubs	Noel Collins	6.59%	449	449	451.65	455.7	478.75	507.75	513.8	523.7	533.05	534.2	554.3	690.95	697.15	697.78	753.17	769.27
Republican Clubs	Thomas Moore	3.82%	260	260	261.65	262.3	277.3	301.35	307.35	311.4	313.45	318.55	376.75	447.55	452.8	453.43	492.58	520.58
SDLP	Denis Smyth	6.10%	416	416	416.55	417.55	421.55	421.55	421.55	423.65	428	431.2	439.5	442.5	453.95	456.47	483.86	
Independent	Basil McGinn	4.93%	336	343.48	343.93	346.93	347.93	348.93	392.93	406.32	411.62	413.96	429.06	438.16	446.16	446.79		
Alliance	Monica Sweeney	2.92%	199	200.02	201.82	203.82	204.82	204.82	205.87	208.07	212.27	308.02	334.32	340.47				
Republican Clubs	Hugh Golding	2.96%	202	202	204.25	212.25	221.25	244.3	248.35	255.65	257.9	262.9	268.25					
Independent	Thomas Hollywood	3.14%	214	214.34	215.69	216.74	219.74	219.74	225.84	226.94	232.39	234.59						
Alliance	Maureen McMahon	2.58%	176	177.02	178.12	180.17	182.17	182.17	185.17	187.32	192.77							
SDLP	John Hillen	1.89%	129	129	135.5	136.65	137.7	137.7	140.9	171.65								
SDLP	R. Blair	1.35%	92	92.34	100.89	100.94	100.94	103.94	107.09									
Irish Labour	Patrick Lynch	1.19%	81	81	81.55	97.7	98.7	100.7										
Republican Clubs	Daniel Hughes	1.17%	80	80	80.1	80.1	89.1											
Republican Clubs	Martin McAlinden	1.13%	77	77	77.1	78.15												
Irish Labour	Michael Murphy	0.85%	58	58.68	59.58													
Electorate: 11,514 Valid: 6,815 (59.19%) Spoilt: 194 Quota: 852 Turnout: 7,009 (60.87%)

=== Area E ===
1973: 3 x SDLP, 1 x Republican Clubs, 1 x Independent Unionist, 1 x Independent Republican

Newry and Mourne Area E - 6 seats
Party	Candidate	FPv%	Count						
Party	Candidate	FPv%	1	2	3	4	5	6	7
Ind. Unionist	Caroline Donaldson	19.06%	720						
SDLP	Peter McMahon	13.92%	526	526	529	550			
Ind. Republican	Sean McCreesh	13.23%	500	504.6	510.6	541.6			
SDLP	Pat Toner	9.16%	346	346.46	349.46	365.46	368.16	442.62	536.62
SDLP	Jim Murphy	8.42%	318	318.92	332.92	343.38	345.18	434.08	541.08
Republican Clubs	Bernard McKeown	7.91%	299	300.38	309.38	441.84	443.64	473.64	499.64
Alliance	John Magowan	5.29%	200	362.38	362.38	366.84	368.64	403.32	462.32
SDLP	James McPartland	7.57%	286	286.92	289.92	310.38	311.28	356.2	
SDLP	Owen Kelly	7.23%	273	279.9	281.9	298.9	299.8		
Republican Clubs	Michael Rafferty	3.94%	149	149.92	163.92				
Republican Clubs	Joseph Daly	2.57%	97	98.38	105.38				
Republican Clubs	Oliver Toner	1.69%	64	64					
Electorate: 8,870 Valid: 3,778 (42.59%) Spoilt: 112 Quota: 540 Turnout: 3,890 (43.86%)

=== Area F ===
1973: 2 x Alliance, 2 x SDLP

Newry and Mourne Area F - 4 seats
Party	Candidate	FPv%	Count							
Party	Candidate	FPv%	1	2	3	4	5	6	7	8
Alliance	Michael McVerry	26.16%	973							
Alliance	Hugh Breslin	15.89%	591	733.62						
SDLP	Sean Hollywood	16.32%	607	620.11	624.01	629.01	682.23	752.23		
SDLP	Arthur Ruddy	8.85%	329	332.68	334.78	342.01	366	464.38	484.9	749.9
Republican Clubs	Samuel Dowling	8.58%	319	321.07	321.37	363.37	388.55	398.07	587.13	615.13
SDLP	Patrick Crilly	7.23%	269	274.29	279.15	279.21	303.44	340.57	352.86	
Republican Clubs	Colman Rowntree	3.93%	146	147.15	147.21	217.39	230.8	234.8		
SDLP	Kevin Reynolds	5.35%	199	205.44	209.34	209.4	227.64			
Irish Labour	Francis Burns	4.06%	151	156.75	166.89	178.18				
Republican Clubs	Jean Rooney	1.91%	71	71.23	71.47					
Republican Clubs	Peter Shields	1.72%	64	64.23	64.41					
Electorate: 6,649 Valid: 3,719 (55.93%) Spoilt: 269 Quota: 744 Turnout: 3,988 (59.98%)
