= Newry and Mourne Area A =

District electoral areas in Newry and Mourne, Northern Ireland

Newry and Mourne Area A was one of the six district electoral areas in Newry and Mourne, Northern Ireland which existed from 1973 to 1985. The district elected five members to Newry and Mourne District Council, and formed part of the South Down constituencies for the Northern Ireland Assembly and UK Parliament.

It was created for the 1973 local elections, and contained the wards of Annalong, Binnian, Cranfield, Kilkeel and Lisnacree. It was abolished for the 1985 local elections and replaced by The Mournes DEA.

== Councillors ==
Election	Councillor (Party)	Councillor (Party)	Councillor (Party)	Councillor (Party)	Councillor (Party)
1981	George Graham (DUP)	William Russell (UUP)	Arthur Coulter (UUP)	Anne Marie Cunningham (SDLP)	Colum Murnion (SDLP)
1977	George Graham (DUP)	William Russell (UUP)	Arthur Coulter (UUP)	Anne Marie Cunningham (SDLP)	Frank MacCann (SDLP)
1973	Norman Gordon (UUP)	William Russell (UUP)	Arthur Coulter (UUP)	Anne Marie Cunningham (SDLP)	Arthur Doran (Independent Nationalist)

== 1981 Election ==
1977: 2 x UUP, 2 x SDLP, 1 x DUP

1981: 2 x UUP, 2 x SDLP, 1 x DUP

1977-1981 Change: No change

Newry and Mourne Area A - 5 seats
Party	Candidate	FPv%	Count			
Party	Candidate	FPv%	1	2	3	4
SDLP	Colum Murnion	21.60%	1,346			
DUP	George Graham*	20.29%	1,264			
UUP	William Russell*	18.54%	1,155			
UUP	Arthur Coulter*	16.88%	1,052			
SDLP	Anne Marie Cunningham*	10.26%	639	899.13	901.13	941.13
Ind. Nationalist	Arthur Doran	9.63%	600	643.01	653.24	720.24
DUP	Robert McConnell	2.81%	175	175.23		
Electorate: 8,729 Valid: 6,231 (71.38%) Spoilt: 212 Quota: 1,039 Turnout: 6,443 (73.81%)

== 1977 Election ==
1973: 3 x UUP, 2 x SDLP, 1 x Independent Nationalist

1977: 2 x UUP, 2 x SDLP, 1 x DUP

1973-1977 Change: SDLP and DUP gain from UUP and Independent Nationalist

Newry and Mourne Area A - 5 seats
Party	Candidate	FPv%	Count					
Party	Candidate	FPv%	1	2	3	4	5	6
UUP	William Russell*	22.15%	1,238					
SDLP	Anne Marie Cunningham*	15.62%	873	873.25	894.5	1,081.5		
UUP	Arthur Coulter*	10.25%	573	793.5	806	806.25	806.25	1,037.25
DUP	George Graham	15.82%	884	910	910.5	911.5	912.34	945.34
SDLP	Frank MacCann	10.18%	569	569.75	585.75	763.75	892.27	910.27
Ind. Nationalist	Arthur Doran*	9.07%	507	509.75	538.5	588.5	607.82	687.82
Independent	John Henning	7.16%	400	450	484.25	485.25	485.25	
SDLP	Hugh Cunningham	7.48%	418	418.5	427.5			
Alliance	Doreen Leitch	2.27%	127	130.75				
Electorate: 8,225 Valid: 5,589 (67.95%) Spoilt: 292 Quota: 932 Turnout: 5,881 (71.50%)

== 1973 Election ==
1973: 3 x UUP, 2 x SDLP, 1 x Independent Nationalist

Newry and Mourne Area A - 5 seats
Party	Candidate	FPv%	Count										
Party	Candidate	FPv%	1	2	3	4	5	6	7	8	9	10	11
UUP	William Russell	20.86%	1,254										
UUP	Arthur Coulter	17.76%	1,068										
UUP	Norman Gordon	14.12%	849	1,088.4									
Ind. Nationalist	Arthur Doran	6.62%	398	399.2	401.4	405	408	427.2	439.2	473.8	562.6	684.6	889.2
SDLP	Anne Marie Cunningham	7.70%	463	463	463.2	463.2	470.2	505	545	561	637	808	877.4
SDLP	Hugh Cunningham	7.47%	449	449.2	450	450.4	452.4	467.4	548.4	566.4	648.4	743.8	775
Ulster Liberal	Stanley Archer	4.79%	288	293.2	318.8	352	355.8	361.8	363.8	483	520.2	556.6	
Ind. Republican	Paul O'Reilly	6.34%	381	381	381	381.8	385.8	400.8	408.8	417.2	498.2		
Independent	Michael Hardy	5.59%	336	336.2	338.2	341.4	348	357	368	397.4			
Alliance	Margaret Hall	2.56%	154	156.2	168.4	188.4	265.2	267.6	273.6				
SDLP	Patrick Murphy	2.68%	161	161	161	161.4	162.4	165.4					
Ind. Nationalist	Austin Crawford	1.80%	108	108	108.4	110	110						
Alliance	P. J. McKeown	1.71%	103	104.4	106.4	108							
Electorate: 8,589 Valid: 6,012 (70.00%) Spoilt: 118 Quota: 1,003 Turnout: 6,130 (71.37%)
