= 1973 Dungannon District Council election =

Local govt election in Northern Ireland

30 May 1973	1977 →

All 20 seats to Dungannon District Council 11 seats needed for a majority
	First party	Second party	Third party
Party	UUP	SDLP	Unity
Seats won	11	5	2
	Fourth party
Party	Ind. Republican
Seats won	2

Elections to Dungannon District Council were held on 30 May 1973 on the same day as the other Northern Irish local government elections. The election used four district electoral areas to elect a total of 20 councillors.

== Election results ==
Party	Seats	±	First Pref. votes	FPv%	±%
UUP	11		11,422	50.2	
SDLP	5		4,913	21.6	
Unity	2		2,297	10.1	
Ind. Republican	2		1,333	5.9	
Alliance	0		1,348	5.9	
Independent	0		634	2.8	
Ind. Nationalist	0		413	1.8	
NI Labour	0		225	1.0	
Republican Clubs	0		179	0.8	
Totals	20		22,764	100.0	—

== Districts summary ==
Results of the Dungannon District Council election, 1973 by district
Ward	%	Cllrs	%	Cllrs	%	Cllrs	%	Cllrs	Total Cllrs
Ward	UUP		SDLP		Unity		Others		Total Cllrs
Area A	52.8	3	19.8	2	22.3	1	5.1	0	5
Area B	27.4	1	35.0	2	7.2	0	30.4	2	5
Area C	67.0	4	16.3	1	3.7	0	13.0	0	5
Area D	52.3	3	15.4	1	7.7	1	24.6	0	5
Total	50.2	11	21.6	5	10.1	2	18.1	2	20

== Districts results ==
=== Area A ===
1973: 3 x UUP, 1 x SDLP, 1 x Unity

Dungannon Area A - 5 seats
Party	Candidate	FPv%	Count								
Party	Candidate	FPv%	1	2	3	4	5	6	7	8	9
UUP	Mervyn Patterson	20.26%	1,129								
UUP	John Hamilton-Stubber	18.68%	1,041								
UUP	Jack Mulligan	13.85%	772	958.49							
SDLP	Joseph Higgins	12.38%	690	690	691.36	704.36	718.53	718.87	730.87	769.76	1,169.76
Unity	Vincent Trainor	11.27%	628	628	628.68	634.68	641.68	641.85	698.85	712.23	728.23
Unity	Bernadette Hughes	6.10%	340	340	342.38	347.55	349.72	349.89	539.89	544.74	575.74
SDLP	Joseph Farrell	7.45%	415	415.17	415.51	423.51	425.85	426.36	437.36	463.06	
Alliance	Arthur Noble	1.76%	98	98.51	175.35	191.69	304.37	317.46	319.46		
Unity	William McDonald	4.92%	274	274	274.34	274.68	275.68	275.85			
Alliance	Norman Kyle	1.88%	105	106.7	131.52	161.88					
Alliance	P. R. Mallon	1.44%	80	81.36	85.78						
Electorate: 6,772 Valid: 5,572 (82.28%) Spoilt: 89 Quota: 929 Turnout: 5,661 (83.59%)

=== Area B ===
1973: 2 x SDLP, 2 x Independent Republican, 1 x UUP

Dungannon Area B - 5 seats
Party	Candidate	FPv%	Count										
Party	Candidate	FPv%	1	2	3	4	5	6	7	8	9	10	11
UUP	Thomas Kempton	27.41%	1,550										
SDLP	Jim Canning	15.01%	849	857	868	891	1,024						
SDLP	Owen Nugent	11.05%	625	631	648	652	687	713.23	714.23	742.45	753.06	777.67	853.5
Ind. Republican	James McQuaid	8.06%	456	457	484	497	500	501.83	571.83	587.44	640.44	695.44	709.44
Ind. Republican	Eugene Lyttle	4.39%	248	248	256	268	270	270.61	341.61	358.61	549.22	685.22	700.22
SDLP	Brendan Kennedy	5.13%	290	294	295	307	331	374.92	417.92	505.92	521.92	561.53	652.14
Alliance	Hugh Cullen	3.11%	176	494	497	499	502	503.83	509.83	538.44	543.44	556.44	
Unity	Al Molloy	4.54%	257	259	292	352	360	361.22	371.22	405.22	430.22		
Ind. Republican	Frank Marshall	4.16%	235	237	246	259	266	267.22	298.22	315.83			
Independent	Arthur O'Neill	3.64%	206	223	229	259	270	273.66	286.66				
Ind. Republican	Hugh McGrath	4.10%	232	233	235	251	254	254					
SDLP	J. S. McGarvey	3.84%	217	218	223	231							
Ind. Republican	P. O'Neill	2.86%	162	165	197								
Unity	Anne O'Donnell	2.69%	152	154									
Electorate: 7,329 Valid: 5,655 (77.16%) Spoilt: 109 Quota: 943 Turnout: 5,764 (78.65%)

=== Area C ===
1973: 4 x UUP, 1 x SDLP

Dungannon Area C - 5 seats
Party	Candidate	FPv%	Count							
Party	Candidate	FPv%	1	2	3	4	5	6	7	8
UUP	Derek Irwin	21.26%	1,291							
UUP	Wilfred Dilworth	18.03%	1,095							
UUP	Jim Brady	13.90%	844	1,084.24						
UUP	William Buchanan	13.85%	841	863.26	936.27	958.04	1,025.36			
SDLP	Patrick Daly	12.74%	774	774.42	774.56	783.56	783.62	783.82	978.89	1,056.89
Independent	Anthony Byrne	5.55%	337	337	337.14	342.21	342.21	342.37	350.37	492.37
Alliance	R. F. Hobson	5.71%	347	353.09	354.42	413.49	414.09	424.13	429.13	436.13
Unity	John McAnespie	3.67%	223	223	223	225	225.12	225.16	237.16	
SDLP	Matt Hegarty	3.52%	214	214	214.07	224.07	224.13	224.13		
Alliance	Jim Boyd	1.76%	107	107.84	108.4					
Electorate: 7,218 Valid: 6,073 (84.14%) Spoilt: 72 Quota: 1,013 Turnout: 6,145 (85.13%)

=== Area D ===
1973: 3 x UUP, 1 x SDLP, 1 x Unity

Dungannon Area D - 5 seats
Party	Candidate	FPv%	Count													
Party	Candidate	FPv%	1	2	3	4	5	6	7	8	9	10	11	12	13	14
UUP	William Brown	20.92%	1,143													
UUP	Adam Wilson	15.94%	871	1,002.2												
UUP	Joel Patton	15.46%	845	928												
SDLP	Michael McLoughlin	11.97%	654	654.2	654.2	673.2	673.2	678.2	682.2	766.2	795.2	828.2	1,010.2			
Unity	Bridget McAleer	5.36%	293	293	293	303	303.08	308.08	398.08	410.08	425.28	500.28	522.28	550.88	580.38	769.38
Alliance	Elizabeth Beatty	4.23%	231	238.6	261.6	270.2	279.8	310.4	310.4	310.4	360.52	361.52	365.52	378.52	583.43	664.43
Ind. Nationalist	Malachy Hughes	4.67%	255	255	255.8	262.8	263.36	267.36	279.36	306.56	343.04	413.04	432.04	460.64	491.67	
Alliance	Ernest Bullock	3.73%	204	206	213.4	217.4	220.28	238.08	240.08	246.08	259.24	264.24	279.24	307.84		
SDLP	Patrick Fox	3.39%	185	185	185	191	191	192	198	219	242	254				
Republican Clubs	Patrick McGurk	3.28%	179	179	179	183	183	183	190	203	213					
NI Labour	Noel Abernethy	2.16%	118	118.4	120.2	134.4	134.96	181.48	186.48	202.48						
Ind. Nationalist	John Donaghy	2.89%	158	158.2	158.2	168.2	168.2	171.2	182.2							
Unity	Joseph Arthurs	2.38%	130	130	130	137	137.08	137.08								
NI Labour	Patricia Stevenson	1.96%	107	109.6	116.6	118.4	119.92									
Independent	Patrick McQuade	1.67%	91	91.4	94.8											
Electorate: 7,014 Valid: 5,464 (77.90%) Spoilt: 73 Quota: 911 Turnout: 5,537 (78.94%)
