= Newry and Mourne Area F =

District electoral areas in Newry and Mourne, Northern Ireland

Newry and Mourne Area F was one of the six district electoral areas in Newry and Mourne, Northern Ireland which existed from 1973 to 1985. The district elected four members to Newry and Mourne District Council, and formed part of the South Down constituencies for the Northern Ireland Assembly and UK Parliament.

It was created for the 1973 local elections, and contained the wards of Drumgullion, St. Mary's, St. Patrick's and Winsor Hill. It was abolished for the 1985 local elections and replaced by the Newry Town DEA.

== Councillors ==
Election	Councillor (Party)	Councillor (Party)	Councillor (Party)	Councillor (Party)
1981	William McCaigue (UUP)	Freddie Kearns (IIP)	Arthur Ruddy (SDLP)	Patrick McElroy (SDLP)
1977	William McCaigue (UUP)	Michael McVerry (Alliance)	Arthur Ruddy (SDLP)	Daniel Hughes (SDLP)
1973	Hugh Breslin (Alliance)	Michael McVerry (Alliance)	Arthur Ruddy (SDLP)	Sean Hollywood (SDLP)

== 1981 Election ==
1977: 2 x SDLP, 1 x UUP, 1 x Alliance

1981: 2 x SDLP, 1 x UUP, 1 x IIP

1977-1981 Change: IIP gain from Alliance

Newry and Mourne Area F - 4 seats
Party	Candidate	FPv%	Count								
Party	Candidate	FPv%	1	2	3	4	5	6	7	8	9
UUP	William McCaigue*	16.19%	752	752	754	755	979				
SDLP	Arthur Ruddy*	18.81%	874	879	893	914	914	915.06	941.06		
Irish Independence	Freddie Kearns	10.31%	479	487	492	518	520	520	642	900	932
SDLP	Patrick McElroy	14.33%	666	670	676	690	690	693.18	702.18	732.18	862.42
SDLP	Louis McGuigan	10.22%	475	477	482	492	492	493.06	545.06	562.06	637.65
Alliance	Michael McVerry*	6.59%	306	310	354	365	376	419.46	421.46	424.46	
Irish Independence	Kevin McAleenan	5.96%	277	281	281	296	300	300	339		
Irish Independence	P. J. McCann	5.34%	248	249	254	268	270	270			
DUP	Gordon Heslip	5.55%	258	258	258	258					
Republican Clubs	Edward McKeown	2.26%	105	105	105						
Republican Clubs	Michael McLoughlin	1.87%	87	89	90						
Alliance	Edward Turley	1.83%	85	86							
Independent	James Malone	0.73%	34								
Electorate: 7,263 Valid: 4,646 (63.97%) Spoilt: 187 Quota: 930 Turnout: 4,833 (66.54%)

== 1977 Election ==
1973: 2 x SDLP, 2 x Alliance

1977: 2 x SDLP, 1 x Alliance, 1 x UUP

1973-1977 Change: UUP gain from Alliance

Newry and Mourne Area F - 4 seats
Party	Candidate	FPv%	Count				
Party	Candidate	FPv%	1	2	3	4	5
UUP	William McCaigue	23.59%	958				
SDLP	Arthur Ruddy*	19.13%	777	777.87	851.87		
Alliance	Michael McVerry*	9.97%	405	485.33	513.33	516.23	813.55
SDLP	Daniel Hughes	14.63%	594	617.49	643.49	646.97	726.87
SDLP	William Feely	13.94%	566	567.45	624.45	643.01	722.52
Alliance	John McClelland	9.95%	404	440.83	499.83	513.17	
Republican Clubs	Alan Wadforth	8.79%	357	357			
Electorate: 7,173 Valid: 4,061 (56.62%) Spoilt: 234 Quota: 813 Turnout: 4,295 (59.88%)

== 1973 Election ==
1973: 2 x Alliance, 2 x SDLP

Newry and Mourne Area F - 4 seats
Party	Candidate	FPv%	Count							
Party	Candidate	FPv%	1	2	3	4	5	6	7	8
Alliance	Michael McVerry	26.16%	973							
Alliance	Hugh Breslin	15.89%	591	733.62						
SDLP	Sean Hollywood	16.32%	607	620.11	624.01	629.01	682.23	752.23		
SDLP	Arthur Ruddy	8.85%	329	332.68	334.78	342.01	366	464.38	484.9	749.9
Republican Clubs	Samuel Dowling	8.58%	319	321.07	321.37	363.37	388.55	398.07	587.13	615.13
SDLP	Patrick Crilly	7.23%	269	274.29	279.15	279.21	303.44	340.57	352.86	
Republican Clubs	Colman Rowntree	3.93%	146	147.15	147.21	217.39	230.8	234.8		
SDLP	Kevin Reynolds	5.35%	199	205.44	209.34	209.4	227.64			
Irish Labour	Francis Burns	4.06%	151	156.75	166.89	178.18				
Republican Clubs	Jean Rooney	1.91%	71	71.23	71.47					
Republican Clubs	Peter Shields	1.72%	64	64.23	64.41					
Electorate: 6,649 Valid: 3,719 (55.93%) Spoilt: 269 Quota: 744 Turnout: 3,988 (59.98%)
