= Newry and Mourne Area B =

District electoral areas in Newry and Mourne, Northern Ireland

Newry and Mourne Area B was one of the six district electoral areas in Newry and Mourne, Northern Ireland which existed from 1973 to 1985. The district elected four members to Newry and Mourne District Council, and formed part of the South Down constituencies for the Northern Ireland Assembly and UK Parliament.

It was created for the 1973 local elections, and contained the wards of Ballycrossan, Clonallan, Rostrevor and Seaview. It was abolished for the 1985 local elections and replaced by the Crotlieve DEA.

== Councillors ==
Election	Councillor (Party)	Councillor (Party)	Councillor (Party)	Councillor (Party)
1981	P. J. Bradley (SDLP)	Jim McCart (SDLP)	Liam Trainor (SDLP)	Brian Mulligan (SDLP)
1977	Anthony Williamson (Alliance)	Jim McCart (SDLP)	Liam Trainor (SDLP)	John McAteer (Independent Nationalist)
1973	Anthony Williamson (Alliance)	Jim McCart (SDLP)	John Tinnelly (SDLP)	John McAteer (Independent Nationalist)

== 1981 Election ==
1977: 2 x SDLP, 1 x Alliance, 1 x Independent Nationalist

1981: 4 x SDLP

1977-1981 Change: SDLP (two seats) gain from Alliance and Independent Nationalist

Newry and Mourne Area B - 4 seats
Party	Candidate	FPv%	Count					
Party	Candidate	FPv%	1	2	3	4	5	6
SDLP	P. J. Bradley	22.27%	1,084					
SDLP	Jim McCart*	17.40%	847	883.5	886.5	974.5		
SDLP	Liam Trainor*	12.23%	595	611.5	617.5	642.4	758.7	804.7
SDLP	Brian Mulligan	12.10%	589	612.7	612.7	624.9	721.1	742.4
Ind. Nationalist	Anthony Williamson*	9.43%	459	462.3	468.3	519.5	638.3	720.3
UUP	William McCoy	8.90%	433	433	434	614	620.5	
Irish Independence	Joe Kearney	8.47%	412	433.3	436.3	469.3		
Alliance	Eithne Doran	3.58%	174	175.8	177.8			
DUP	Raymond Hanna	2.77%	135	135.2	135.2			
Independent	Peter Maloy	2.18%	106	106.5	112.5			
Independent Labour	Johnny Ward	0.68%	33	33				
Electorate: 6,919 Valid: 4,867 (70.34%) Spoilt: 182 Quota: 974 Turnout: 5,049 (72.97%)

== 1977 Election ==
1973: 2 x SDLP, 1 x Alliance, 1 x Independent Nationalist

1977: 2 x SDLP, 1 x Alliance, 1 x Independent Nationalist

1973-1977 Change: No change

Newry and Mourne Area B - 4 seats
Party	Candidate	FPv%	Count					
Party	Candidate	FPv%	1	2	3	4	5	6
SDLP	Jim McCart*	31.71%	1,377					
Alliance	Anthony Williamson*	15.93%	692	727.72	792	797.14	831.9	977.9
Ind. Nationalist	John McAteer*	15.82%	687	715.88	721.26	725.26	763.78	809.54
SDLP	Liam Trainor	8.24%	358	658.96	665.72	665.72	709.64	727.3
SDLP	Brian Mulligan	10.04%	436	528.34	531.62	533	563.56	570.22
UUP	William Gordon	7.83%	340	348.36	350.74	497.04	503.64	
Republican Clubs	Thomas Moore	4.72%	205	224	230.04	230.04		
UUP	James Thompson	3.78%	164	167.8	168.8			
Alliance	James McGowan	1.93%	84	93.5				
Electorate: 6,723 Valid: 4,343 (64.60%) Spoilt: 276 Quota: 869 Turnout: 4,619 (68.70%)

== 1973 Election ==
1973: 2 x SDLP, 1 x Alliance, 1 x Independent Nationalist

Newry and Mourne Area B - 4 seats
Party	Candidate	FPv%	Count								
Party	Candidate	FPv%	1	2	3	4	5	6	7	8	9
SDLP	Jim McCart	21.99%	994								
Ind. Nationalist	John McAteer	16.59%	750	758.1	762.73	781.54	799.63	805.72	816.17	873.76	993.76
Alliance	Anthony Williamson	12.99%	587	592.4	595.4	602.12	631.39	641.66	800.1	825.24	852.59
SDLP	John Tinnelly	8.54%	386	398.69	401.69	427.2	432.32	454.65	457.83	645.71	759.4
UUP	William Gordon	12.96%	586	587.53	588.53	588.62	591.62	591.62	634.98	640.25	649.61
Republican Clubs	Gerard Burns	8.67%	392	395.96	428.14	435.77	452.77	562.31	563.4	586.18	
SDLP	Edward Byrne	4.65%	210	242.76	244.94	309.74	313.1	317.46	326.18		
Alliance	Roland Gordon	3.69%	167	170.24	170.24	175.42	231.42	231.42			
Republican Clubs	Gerald Sherry	2.88%	130	130.9	141.53	144.71	153.71				
Alliance	Michael Gallagher	3.10%	140	140.9	140.9	142.99					
SDLP	William Trainor	2.68%	121	138.01	140.1						
Republican Clubs	James McGivern	1.26%	57	58.71							
Electorate: 6,662 Valid: 4,520 (67.85%) Spoilt: 140 Quota: 905 Turnout: 4,660 (69.95%)
