= Newry and Mourne Area D =

District electoral areas in Newry and Mourne, Northern Ireland

Newry and Mourne Area D was one of the six district electoral areas in Newry and Mourne, Northern Ireland which existed from 1973 to 1985. The district elected seven members to Newry and Mourne District Council, and formed part of the Armagh constituencies for the Northern Ireland Assembly and UK Parliament, and part of the South Down constituencies for the Northern Ireland Assembly and UK Parliament.

It was created for the 1973 local elections, and contained the wards of Ballybot, Bessbrook, Daisy Hill, Derrymore, Drumalane, Fathom and Tullyhappy. It was abolished for the 1985 local elections with 2 wards going to The Fews DEA, 4 to the Newry DEA and Fathom to Slieve Gullion DEA.

== Councillors ==
Election	Councillor (Party)	Councillor (Party)	Councillor (Party)	Councillor (Party)	Councillor (Party)	Councillor (Party)	Councillor (Party)
1981	Clarence Morrow (UUP)/ (Independent Unionist)	Andy Moffett (UUP)	Francis McCamley (IIP)	Eugene Markey (IIP)/ (Independent Nationalist)	John McEvoy (SDLP)	Thomas McGrath (SDLP)	John Bell (SDLP)
1977	Clarence Morrow (UUP)/ (Independent Unionist)	Andy Moffett (UUP)	Victor Frizell (Alliance)	Eugene Markey (IIP)/ (Independent Nationalist)	John McEvoy (SDLP)	Thomas McGrath (SDLP)	John Bell (SDLP)
1973	Clarence Morrow (UUP)/ (Independent Unionist)	Arthur Lockhart (Independent Unionist)	Victor Frizell (Alliance)	Noel Collins (Republican Clubs)	John McEvoy (SDLP)	Thomas McGrath (SDLP)	John Bell (SDLP)

== 1981 Election ==
1977: 3 x SDLP, 2 x UUP, 1 x Alliance, 1 x Independent Nationalist

1981: 3 x SDLP, 2 x UUP, 2 x IIP

1977-1981 Change: IIP gain from Alliance, Independent Nationalist joins IIP

Newry and Mourne Area D - 7 seats
Party	Candidate	FPv%	Count								
Party	Candidate	FPv%	1	2	3	4	5	6	7	8	9
Irish Independence	Eugene Markey*	23.56%	1,831								
SDLP	John McEvoy*	12.72%	988								
UUP	Andy Moffett*	10.36%	805	808.43	808.43	1,017.43					
SDLP	Thomas McGrath*	8.07%	627	735.29	749.23	751.72	806.44	806.44	1,201.44		
SDLP	John Bell*	8.55%	664	745.83	772.75	774.24	814	814	938.9	1,148.9	
UUP	Clarence Morrow*	8.69%	675	676.47	676.47	756.47	761.96	810.68	812.17	812.17	814.27
Irish Independence	Francis McCamley	2.15%	167	681.99	705.4	707.38	753.08	753.08	774.98	781.98	804.38
Alliance	Victor Frizell*	7.57%	588	621.81	632.79	635.79	695.2	695.68	733.13	748.53	774.43
SDLP	Michael McNulty	7.62%	592	611.6	622.6	622.6	633.05	633.05			
Republican Clubs	Brian Mulligan	3.69%	287	351.68	452.58	452.58					
DUP	George McConnell	3.90%	303	306.43	306.43						
Republican Clubs	Matthew Cunningham	2.61%	203	222.6							
Electorate: 11,891 Valid: 7,770 (65.34%) Spoilt: 280 Quota: 967 Turnout: 5,010 (42.13%)

== 1977 Election ==
1973: 3 x SDLP, 2 x Independent Unionist, 1 x Alliance, 1 x Republican Clubs

1977: 3 x SDLP, 2 x UUP, 1 x Alliance, 1 x Independent Nationalist

1973-1977 Change: UUP (two seats) and Independent Nationalist gain from Independent Unionist (two seats) and Republican Clubs

Newry and Mourne Area D - 7 seats
Party	Candidate	FPv%	Count								
Party	Candidate	FPv%	1	2	3	4	5	6	7	8	9
UUP	Clarence Morrow*	13.32%	845								
SDLP	John Bell*	12.86%	816								
UUP	Andy Moffett	12.20%	774	822.66							
SDLP	Thomas McGrath*	11.91%	756	756.06	756.3	760.3	765.7	796.7			
SDLP	John McEvoy*	11.11%	705	705	705.06	727.06	730.5	761.78	768.84	810.84	
Alliance	Victor Frizell*	7.85%	498	498.66	507.66	565.8	566.58	589.8	591.86	631.16	699.84
Ind. Nationalist	Eugene Markey	8.81%	559	559.06	559.06	562.06	562.56	564.58	575.6	661.72	684.98
Republican Clubs	Noel Collins*	5.23%	332	332	332	335	335.64	339.64	451.66	515.14	564.56
SDLP	John Grant	6.11%	388	388.12	388.54	389.6	392.92	435.04	438.08	467.26	
Independent	Fabian Boyle	4.35%	276	276	276.06	283.18	284.3	288.36	297.38		
Republican Clubs	Edward McGeown	2.36%	150	150	150	150.06	150.18	151.18			
SDLP	Patrick Sloan	2.24%	142	142.18	142.36	146.36	146.84				
Alliance	Monica Sweeney	1.65%	105	105.24	106.74						
Electorate: 11,390 Valid: 6,346 (55.72%) Spoilt: 343 Quota: 794 Turnout: 6,689 (58.73%)

== 1973 Election ==
1973: 3 x SDLP, 2 x Independent Unionist, 1 x Alliance, 1 x Republican Clubs

Newry and Mourne Area D - 7 seats
Party	Candidate	FPv%	Count															
Party	Candidate	FPv%	1	2	3	4	5	6	7	8	9	10	11	12	13	14	15	16
Ind. Unionist	Clarence Morrow	19.03%	1,297															
SDLP	John Bell	13.25%	903															
SDLP	John McEvoy	10.98%	748	748.34	758.34	763.44	765.44	767.44	774.44	785.44	837.89	860.89						
Ind. Unionist	Arthur Lockhart	5.85%	399	823.66	823.66	824.66	824.66	825.66	825.66	825.66	825.66	826.66	829.66	831.66	835	835	859	
SDLP	Thomas McGrath	4.80%	327	327	331.55	339.65	345.7	348.7	353.75	364.25	435.55	440.99	446.08	489.28	505.88	506.51	564.15	937.15
Alliance	Victor Frizell	5.46%	372	376.08	377.98	381.42	381.42	382.42	386.47	397.92	403.17	443.66	445.76	456.76	710.15	713.93	809.14	833.37
Republican Clubs	Noel Collins	6.59%	449	449	451.65	455.7	478.75	507.75	513.8	523.7	533.05	534.2	554.3	690.95	697.15	697.78	753.17	769.27
Republican Clubs	Thomas Moore	3.82%	260	260	261.65	262.3	277.3	301.35	307.35	311.4	313.45	318.55	376.75	447.55	452.8	453.43	492.58	520.58
SDLP	Denis Smyth	6.10%	416	416	416.55	417.55	421.55	421.55	421.55	423.65	428	431.2	439.5	442.5	453.95	456.47	483.86	
Independent	Basil McGinn	4.93%	336	343.48	343.93	346.93	347.93	348.93	392.93	406.32	411.62	413.96	429.06	438.16	446.16	446.79		
Alliance	Monica Sweeney	2.92%	199	200.02	201.82	203.82	204.82	204.82	205.87	208.07	212.27	308.02	334.32	340.47				
Republican Clubs	Hugh Golding	2.96%	202	202	204.25	212.25	221.25	244.3	248.35	255.65	257.9	262.9	268.25					
Independent	Thomas Hollywood	3.14%	214	214.34	215.69	216.74	219.74	219.74	225.84	226.94	232.39	234.59						
Alliance	Maureen McMahon	2.58%	176	177.02	178.12	180.17	182.17	182.17	185.17	187.32	192.77							
SDLP	John Hillen	1.89%	129	129	135.5	136.65	137.7	137.7	140.9	171.65								
SDLP	R. Blair	1.35%	92	92.34	100.89	100.94	100.94	103.94	107.09									
Irish Labour	Patrick Lynch	1.19%	81	81	81.55	97.7	98.7	100.7										
Republican Clubs	Daniel Hughes	1.17%	80	80	80.1	80.1	89.1											
Republican Clubs	Martin McAlinden	1.13%	77	77	77.1	78.15												
Irish Labour	Michael Murphy	0.85%	58	58.68	59.58													
Electorate: 11,514 Valid: 6,815 (59.19%) Spoilt: 194 Quota: 852 Turnout: 7,009 (60.87%)
