= 1977 Dungannon District Council election =

Local govt election in Northern Ireland

← 1973	18 May 1977	1981 →

All 20 seats to Dungannon District Council 11 seats needed for a majority
	First party	Second party	Third party
Party	UUP	SDLP	DUP
Seats won	8	6	2
Seat change	▼3	▲1	▲2
	Fourth party	Fifth party	Sixth party
Party	Ind. Nationalist	Independent	Ind. Republican
Seats won	2	1	1
Seat change	▲2	▲1	▼1
	Seventh party
Party	Unity
Seats won	0
Seat change	▼2

Elections to Dungannon District Council were held on 18 May 1977 on the same day as the other Northern Irish local government elections. The election used four district electoral areas to elect a total of 20 councillors.

== Election results ==
Dungannon District Council Election Result 1977
Party	Seats	Gains	Losses	Net gain/loss	Seats %	Votes %	Votes	+/−
UUP	8	0	3	▼3	40.0	38.1	8,437	▼12.1
SDLP	6	1	0	▲1	30.0	24.5	5,422	▲2.9
DUP	2	2	0	▲2	10.0	6.1	1,343	New
Ind. Nationalist	2	2	0	▲2	10.0	9.6	2,122	▲7.8
Independent	1	1	0	▲1	5.0	13.0	2,876	▲10.2
Ind. Republican	1	1	2	▼1	5.0	2.5	550	▼1.6
Alliance	0	0	0	0	0.0	2.9	644	▼3.0
Republican Clubs	0	0	0	0	0.0	2.8	617	▲2.0
UUUP	0	0	0	0	0.0	1.8	401	New

Note: "Votes" are the first preference votes.

== Districts summary ==
Results of the Dungannon District Council election, 1977 by district
Ward	%	Cllrs	%	Cllrs	%	Cllrs	%	Cllrs	Total Cllrs
Ward	UUP		SDLP		DUP		Others		Total Cllrs
Area A	34.4	2	30.2	2	9.8	1	25.6	0	5
Area B	21.9	1	26.5	2	0.0	0	51.6	2	5
Area C	71.1	4	23.8	1	0.0	0	5.1	0	5
Area D	27.2	1	17.5	1	15.0	1	40.3	2	5
Total	38.1	8	24.5	6	6.1	2	31.3	4	20

== Districts results ==
=== Area A ===
1973: 3 x UUP, 1 x SDLP, 1 x Unity
1977: 2 x UUP, 2 x SDLP, 1 x DUP
1973-1977 Change: SDLP and DUP gain from UUP and Unity

Dungannon Area A - 5 seats
Party	Candidate	FPv%	Count							
Party	Candidate	FPv%	1	2	3	4	5	6	7	8
SDLP	Joseph Higgins*	17.60%	921							
UUP	Winston Mulligan	10.26%	537	579	665	1,151				
UUP	John Hamilton-Stubber*	13.49%	706	804	836	900				
DUP	William McIlwrath	9.77%	511	528	778	809	1,009			
SDLP	Edward Donnelly	12.63%	661	695	695	695	698	700	734.85	735.85
Independent	Brian McKenna	13.23%	692	710	714	715	717	722	729.4	733.4
UUP	Mervyn Patterson*	10.67%	558	566	592					
UUUP	Ian McCormick	7.66%	401	414						
Independent	Jack Johnston	4.68%	245							
Electorate: 6,660 Valid: 5,232 (78.56%) Spoilt: 237 Quota: 873 Turnout: 5,469 (82.12%)

=== Area B ===
1973: 2 x SDLP, 2 x Independent Republican, 1 x UUP
1977: 2 x SDLP, 1 x UUP, 1 x Independent Nationalist, 1 x Independent Republican
1973-1977 Change: SDLP gain from Independent Republican, Independent Nationalist leaves SDLP

Dungannon Area B - 5 seats
Party	Candidate	FPv%	Count						
Party	Candidate	FPv%	1	2	3	4	5	6	7
Ind. Nationalist	Jim Canning*	24.92%	1,494						
UUP	Thomas Kempton*	21.91%	1,314						
SDLP	Owen Nugent*	13.63%	817	825.16	844.6	866.94	896.47	939.53	1,099.53
Ind. Republican	John Corr	9.17%	550	746.52	757.05	759.39	818.15	841.23	1,033.23
SDLP	Patrick McGlinchey	8.94%	536	647.18	660.95	660.95	794.75	845.39	860.26
Republican Clubs	Eugene Lyttle*	6.57%	394	523.54	530.02	595.7	609.06	625.62	659.36
Independent	Arthur Donaghy	7.04%	422	435.26	448.22	469.56	471.9	488.87	
Alliance	Francis Falls	1.93%	116	125.52	370.95	370.95	378.29		
SDLP	Brian McLernon	3.97%	238	254.66	256.28	256.62			
Republican Clubs	James McQuaid*	1.92%	115	117.04	118.66				
Electorate: 7,638 Valid: 5,996 (78.50%) Spoilt: 233 Quota: 1,000 Turnout: 6,229 (81.55%)

=== Area C ===
1973: 4 x UUP, 1 x SDLP
1977: 4 x UUP, 1 x SDLP
1973-1977 Change: No change

Dungannon Area C - 5 seats
Party	Candidate	FPv%	Count		
Party	Candidate	FPv%	1	2	3
UUP	Wilfred Dilworth*	22.08%	1,182		
UUP	Derek Irwin*	21.30%	1,140		
SDLP	Patrick Daly*	18.31%	980		
UUP	William Buchanan*	12.89%	690	894.12	
UUP	Jim Brady*	14.85%	795	876.27	1,117.17
SDLP	Mary McKinney	5.51%	295	296.08	297.18
Independent	Anthony Byrne	5.06%	271	272.89	275.97
Electorate: 7,175 Valid: 5,353 (74.61%) Spoilt: 277 Quota: 893 Turnout: 5,630 (78.47%)

=== Area D ===
1973: 3 x UUP, 1 x SDLP, 1 x Unity
1977: 2 x Independent, 1 x UUP, 1 x SDLP, 1 x DUP
1973-1977 Change: Independent (two seats) and DUP gain from UUP (two seats) and Unity

Dungannon Area D - 5 seats
Party	Candidate	FPv%	Count							
Party	Candidate	FPv%	1	2	3	4	5	6	7	8
Independent	Jack Hassard	22.41%	1,246							
UUP	William Brown*	16.46%	915	950.62						
SDLP	Michael McLoughlin*	15.07%	838	916.26	926.6	955.6				
Ind. Nationalist	John Donaghy	8.42%	468	540.8	548.1	571.52	646.2	659.2	709.14	927.26
DUP	Maurice Morrow	14.96%	832	850.98	850.98	850.98	850.98	850.98	865.84	872.4
UUP	Adam Wilson*	10.79%	600	614.3	618.08	618.08	618.08	618.08	727.02	731.58
Ind. Nationalist	Malachy Hughes	2.88%	160	205.24	207.28	252.62	297.48	309.48	330.12	
Alliance	Peter Acheson	3.18%	177	194.16	255.84	257.1	266.14	267.14		
SDLP	Sean Kerr	2.45%	136	145.36	148.14	158.44				
Republican Clubs	Patrick McGurk	1.94%	108	118.14	119.14					
Alliance	Hugh Cullen	1.44%	80	91.44						
Electorate: 7,532 Valid: 5,560 (73.82%) Spoilt: 169 Quota: 927 Turnout: 5,729 (76.06%)
