= Dungannon Area D =

District electoral areas in Dungannon, Northern Ireland

Dungannon Area D was one of the four district electoral areas in Dungannon, Northern Ireland which existed from 1973 to 1985. The district elected five members to Dungannon District Council, and formed part of the Fermanagh and South Tyrone constituencies for the Northern Ireland Assembly and UK Parliament.

It was created for the 1973 local elections, and contained the wards of Drumglass, Killymaddy, Killymeal, Lisnahull and Moygashel. It was abolished for the 1985 local elections and replaced by the Dungannon Town DEA.

== Councillors ==
Election	Councillor (Party)	Councillor (Party)	Councillor (Party)	Councillor (Party)	Councillor (Party)
1981	Maurice Morrow (DUP)	William Brown (UUP)	Ken Maginnis (UUP)	Plunkett O'Donnell (IIP)	Michael McLoughlin (Independent Nationalist)/ (SDLP)
1977	Maurice Morrow (DUP)	William Brown (UUP)	Jack Hassard (Independent)	John Donaghy (Independent Nationalist)	Michael McLoughlin (Independent Nationalist)/ (SDLP)
1973	Adam Wilson (UUP)	William Brown (UUP)	Joel Patton (UUP)	Bridget McAleer (Unity)	Michael McLoughlin (Independent Nationalist)/ (SDLP)

== 1981 Election ==
1977: 2 x Independent, 1 x UUP, 1 x SDLP, 1 x DUP

1981: 2 x UUP, 1 x DUP, 1 x IIP, 1 x Independent Nationalist

1977-1981 Change: UUP and IIP gain from Independent (two seats), Independent Nationalist leaves SDLP

Dungannon Area D - 5 seats
Party	Candidate	FPv%	Count			
Party	Candidate	FPv%	1	2	3	4
DUP	Maurice Morrow*	19.90%	1,124			
UUP	Ken Maginnis	19.21%	1,085			
Irish Independence	Plunkett O'Donnell	18.81%	1,062			
UUP	William Brown*	18.52%	1,046			
Ind. Nationalist	Michael McLoughlin*	13.30%	751	799	835	939.26
SDLP	Peggy Devlin	10.25%	579	615	700	712.87
Electorate: 7,669 Valid: 5,647 (73.63%) Spoilt: 115 Quota: 942 Turnout: 5,762 (75.13%)

== 1977 Election ==
1973: 3 x UUP, 1 x SDLP, 1 x Unity

1977: 2 x Independent, 1 x UUP, 1 x SDLP, 1 x DUP

1973-1977 Change: Independent (two seats) and DUP gain from UUP (two seats) and Unity

Dungannon Area D - 5 seats
Party	Candidate	FPv%	Count							
Party	Candidate	FPv%	1	2	3	4	5	6	7	8
Independent	Jack Hassard	22.41%	1,246							
UUP	William Brown*	16.46%	915	950.62						
SDLP	Michael McLoughlin*	15.07%	838	916.26	926.6	955.6				
Ind. Nationalist	John Donaghy	8.42%	468	540.8	548.1	571.52	646.2	659.2	709.14	927.26
DUP	Maurice Morrow	14.96%	832	850.98	850.98	850.98	850.98	850.98	865.84	872.4
UUP	Adam Wilson*	10.79%	600	614.3	618.08	618.08	618.08	618.08	727.02	731.58
Ind. Nationalist	Malachy Hughes	2.88%	160	205.24	207.28	252.62	297.48	309.48	330.12	
Alliance	Peter Acheson	3.18%	177	194.16	255.84	257.1	266.14	267.14		
SDLP	Sean Kerr	2.45%	136	145.36	148.14	158.44				
Republican Clubs	Patrick McGurk	1.94%	108	118.14	119.14					
Alliance	Hugh Cullen	1.44%	80	91.44						
Electorate: 7,532 Valid: 5,560 (73.82%) Spoilt: 169 Quota: 927 Turnout: 5,729 (76.06%)

== 1973 Election ==
1973: 3 x UUP, 1 x SDLP, 1 x Unity

Dungannon Area D - 5 seats
Party	Candidate	FPv%	Count													
Party	Candidate	FPv%	1	2	3	4	5	6	7	8	9	10	11	12	13	14
UUP	William Brown	20.92%	1,143													
UUP	Adam Wilson	15.94%	871	1,002.2												
UUP	Joel Patton	15.46%	845	928												
SDLP	Michael McLoughlin	11.97%	654	654.2	654.2	673.2	673.2	678.2	682.2	766.2	795.2	828.2	1,010.2			
Unity	Bridget McAleer	5.36%	293	293	293	303	303.08	308.08	398.08	410.08	425.28	500.28	522.28	550.88	580.38	769.38
Alliance	Elizabeth Beatty	4.23%	231	238.6	261.6	270.2	279.8	310.4	310.4	310.4	360.52	361.52	365.52	378.52	583.43	664.43
Ind. Nationalist	Malachy Hughes	4.67%	255	255	255.8	262.8	263.36	267.36	279.36	306.56	343.04	413.04	432.04	460.64	491.67	
Alliance	Ernest Bullock	3.73%	204	206	213.4	217.4	220.28	238.08	240.08	246.08	259.24	264.24	279.24	307.84		
SDLP	Patrick Fox	3.39%	185	185	185	191	191	192	198	219	242	254				
Republican Clubs	Patrick McGurk	3.28%	179	179	179	183	183	183	190	203	213					
NI Labour	Noel Abernethy	2.16%	118	118.4	120.2	134.4	134.96	181.48	186.48	202.48						
Ind. Nationalist	John Donaghy	2.89%	158	158.2	158.2	168.2	168.2	171.2	182.2							
Unity	Joseph Arthurs	2.38%	130	130	130	137	137.08	137.08								
NI Labour	Patricia Stevenson	1.96%	107	109.6	116.6	118.4	119.92									
Independent	Patrick McQuade	1.67%	91	91.4	94.8											
Electorate: 7,014 Valid: 5,464 (77.90%) Spoilt: 73 Quota: 911 Turnout: 5,537 (78.94%)
