= 1981 Dungannon District Council election =

Local govt election in Northern Ireland

← 1977	20 May 1981	1985 →

All 20 seats to Dungannon District Council 11 seats needed for a majority
	First party	Second party	Third party
Party	UUP	SDLP	DUP
Seats won	8	3	3
Seat change	0	▼3	▲1
	Fourth party	Fifth party	Sixth party
Party	Ind. Nationalist	Ind. Republican	Irish Independence
Seats won	3	2	1
Seat change	▲2	▲1	▲1
	Seventh party
Party	Independent
Seats won	0
Seat change	▼2

Elections to Dungannon District Council were held on 20 May 1981 on the same day as the other Northern Irish local government elections. The election used four district electoral areas to elect a total of 20 councillors.

== Election results ==
Dungannon District Council Election Result 1981
Party	Seats	Gains	Losses	Net gain/loss	Seats %	Votes %	Votes	+/−
UUP	8	1	1	0	40.0	31.0	7,227	▼7.1
SDLP	3	0	3	▼3	15.0	20.5	4,786	▼4.0
DUP	3	1	0	▲1	15.0	17.7	4,135	▼0.5
Ind. Nationalist	3	2	0	▲2	15.0	15.6	3,635	▲8.9
Ind. Republican	2	1	0	▲1	10.0	6.8	1,596	▲4.3
Irish Independence	1	1	0	▲1	5.0	4.6	1,062	New
Ind. Unionist	0	0	0	0	0.0	2.4	558	▲2.4
UUUP	0	0	0	0	0.0	0.9	205	▼0.9
Independent	0	0	2	▼2	0.0	0.4	104	▼15.4

Note: "Votes" are the first preference votes.

== Districts summary ==
Results of the Dungannon District Council election, 1981 by district
Ward	%	Cllrs	%	Cllrs	%	Cllrs	%	Cllrs	%	Cllrs	Total Cllrs
Ward	UUP		SDLP		DUP		IIP		Others		Total Cllrs
Area A	33.3	2	29.4	1	19.4	0	0.0	0	17.9	1	5
Area B	15.4	1	19.0	1	8.3	0	0.0	0	57.3	3	5
Area C	38.2	3	23.0	1	23.7	1	0.0	0	15.1	0	5
Area D	37.7	2	10.3	0	19.9	1	18.8	1	13.3	1	5
Total	31.0	8	20.5	3	17.7	3	4.6	1	26.2	5	20

== Districts results ==
=== Area A ===
1977: 2 x UUP, 2 x SDLP, 1 x DUP
1981: 2 x UUP, 1 x SDLP, 1 x DUP, 1 x Independent Republican
1977-1981 Change: Independent Republican gain from SDLP

Dungannon Area A - 5 seats
Party	Candidate	FPv%	Count					
Party	Candidate	FPv%	1	2	3	4	5	6
Ind. Republican	Seamus Cassidy*	17.81%	1,057					
UUP	Noel Mulligan	13.43%	797	797.1	1,146.1			
DUP	William McIlwrath*	9.82%	583	583.1	620.1	630.45	1,092.45	
UUP	Samuel Brush	10.67%	633	633.5	784.5	927.15	1,033.05	
SDLP	Anthony McGonnell	14.98%	889	923.1	925.1	925.1	927.1	948.1
SDLP	John Monaghan	14.43%	856	885	886	886.45	886.45	891.45
DUP	Frederick Burrows	9.61%	570	570	579	580.35		
UUP	Winston Mulligan*	9.25%	549	549				
Electorate: 6,624 Valid: 5,934 (89.58%) Spoilt: 92 Quota: 990 Turnout: 6,026 (90.97%)

=== Area B ===
1977: 2 x SDLP, 1 x UUP, 1 x Independent Nationalist, 1 x Independent Republican
1981: 2 x Independent Nationalist, 1 x SDLP, 1 x UUP, 1 x Independent Republican
1977-1981 Change: Independent Nationalist leaves SDLP

Dungannon Area B - 5 seats
Party	Candidate	FPv%	Count	
Party	Candidate	FPv%	1	2
Ind. Nationalist	Jim Canning*	29.18%	1,744	
Ind. Nationalist	Owen Nugent*	19.08%	1,140	
SDLP	Patrick McGlinchey*	19.04%	1,138	
Ind. Republican	John Corr*	9.02%	539	1,275.47
UUP	Thomas Kempton*	15.36%	918	921.43
DUP	Abraham White	8.32%	497	498.96
Electorate: 7,753 Valid: 5,976 (77.08%) Spoilt: 210 Quota: 997 Turnout: 6,186 (79.79%)

=== Area C ===
1977: 3 x UUP, 1 x SDLP, 1 x DUP
1981: 4 x UUP, 1 x SDLP
1977-1981 Change: DUP gain from UUP

Dungannon Area C - 5 seats
Party	Candidate	FPv%	Count					
Party	Candidate	FPv%	1	2	3	4	5	6
SDLP	Patrick Daly*	23.02%	1,324					
UUP	Derek Irwin*	17.06%	981					
DUP	James Ewing	13.53%	778	788.8	848.8	867.2	868.6	1,054.28
UUP	John Taggart	11.25%	647	669.2	712.4	728.8	730.18	906.1
UUP	Jim Brady*	9.93%	571	599.8	631	653.8	669.14	848.06
DUP	Norman Lockhart	10.14%	583	585.4	620.4	638.2	638.82	664.5
Ind. Unionist	Wilfred Dilworth*	9.70%	558	570.6	602.8	623	623.64	
Independent	William Lucas	1.81%	104	383	386			
UUUP	James McNeill	3.56%	205	212.8				
Electorate: 7,091 Valid: 5,751 (81.10%) Spoilt: 125 Quota: 959 Turnout: 5,876 (82.87%)

=== Area D ===
1977: 2 x Independent, 1 x UUP, 1 x SDLP, 1 x DUP
1981: 2 x UUP, 1 x DUP, 1 x IIP, 1 x Independent Nationalist
1977-1981 Change: UUP and IIP gain from Independent (two seats), Independent Nationalist leaves SDLP

Dungannon Area D - 5 seats
Party	Candidate	FPv%	Count			
Party	Candidate	FPv%	1	2	3	4
DUP	Maurice Morrow*	19.90%	1,124			
UUP	Ken Maginnis	19.21%	1,085			
Irish Independence	Plunkett O'Donnell	18.81%	1,062			
UUP	William Brown*	18.52%	1,046			
Ind. Nationalist	Michael McLoughlin*	13.30%	751	799	835	939.26
SDLP	Peggy Devlin	10.25%	579	615	700	712.87
Electorate: 7,669 Valid: 5,647 (73.63%) Spoilt: 115 Quota: 942 Turnout: 5,762 (75.13%)
