= Dungannon Area B =

District electoral areas in Dungannon, Northern Ireland

Dungannon Area B was one of the four district electoral areas in Dungannon, Northern Ireland which existed from 1973 to 1985. The district elected five members to Dungannon District Council, and formed part of the Fermanagh and South Tyrone constituencies for the Northern Ireland Assembly and UK Parliament.

It was created for the 1973 local elections, and contained the wards of Altmore, Coalisland North, Coalisland South, Donaghmore and Washing Bay. It was abolished for the 1985 local elections and replaced by the Torrent DEA.

== Councillors ==
| Election | Councillor (Party) | Councillor (Party) | Councillor (Party) | Councillor (Party) | Councillor (Party) |
|---|---|---|---|---|---|
| 1981 | Thomas Kempton (UUP) | Patrick McGlinchey (SDLP) | Owen Nugent (Independent Nationalist)/ (SDLP) | Jim Canning (Independent Nationalist)/ (SDLP) | John Corr (Independent Republican) |
| 1977 | Thomas Kempton (UUP) | Patrick McGlinchey (SDLP) | Owen Nugent (Independent Nationalist)/ (SDLP) | Jim Canning (Independent Nationalist)/ (SDLP) | John Corr (Independent Republican) |
| 1973 | Thomas Kempton (UUP) | James McQuaid (Independent Republican) | Owen Nugent (Independent Nationalist)/ (SDLP) | Jim Canning (Independent Nationalist)/ (SDLP) | Eugene Lyttle (Independent Republican) |

== 1981 Election ==
1977: 2 x SDLP, 1 x UUP, 1 x Independent Nationalist, 1 x Independent Republican

1981: 2 x Independent Nationalist, 1 x SDLP, 1 x UUP, 1 x Independent Republican

1977-1981 Change: Independent Nationalist leaves SDLP

Dungannon Area B - 5 seats
| Party | Candidate | FPv% | Count | |
| Party | Candidate | FPv% | 1 | 2 |
|---|---|---|---|---|
| Ind. Nationalist | Jim Canning* | 29.18% | 1,744 | |
| Ind. Nationalist | Owen Nugent* | 19.08% | 1,140 | |
| SDLP | Patrick McGlinchey* | 19.04% | 1,138 | |
| Ind. Republican | John Corr* | 9.02% | 539 | 1,275.47 |
| UUP | Thomas Kempton* | 15.36% | 918 | 921.43 |
| DUP | Abraham White | 8.32% | 497 | 498.96 |
Electorate: 7,753 Valid: 5,976 (77.08%) Spoilt: 210 Quota: 997 Turnout: 6,186 (79.79%)

== 1977 Election ==
1973: 2 x SDLP, 2 x Independent Republican, 1 x UUP

1977: 2 x SDLP, 1 x UUP, 1 x Independent Nationalist, 1 x Independent Republican

1973-1977 Change: SDLP gain from Independent Republican, Independent Nationalist leaves SDLP

Dungannon Area B - 5 seats
| Party | Candidate | FPv% | Count | | | | | | |
| Party | Candidate | FPv% | 1 | 2 | 3 | 4 | 5 | 6 | 7 |
|---|---|---|---|---|---|---|---|---|---|
| Ind. Nationalist | Jim Canning* | 24.92% | 1,494 | | | | | | |
| UUP | Thomas Kempton* | 21.91% | 1,314 | | | | | | |
| SDLP | Owen Nugent* | 13.63% | 817 | 825.16 | 844.6 | 866.94 | 896.47 | 939.53 | 1,099.53 |
| Ind. Republican | John Corr | 9.17% | 550 | 746.52 | 757.05 | 759.39 | 818.15 | 841.23 | 1,033.23 |
| SDLP | Patrick McGlinchey | 8.94% | 536 | 647.18 | 660.95 | 660.95 | 794.75 | 845.39 | 860.26 |
| Republican Clubs | Eugene Lyttle* | 6.57% | 394 | 523.54 | 530.02 | 595.7 | 609.06 | 625.62 | 659.36 |
| Independent | Arthur Donaghy | 7.04% | 422 | 435.26 | 448.22 | 469.56 | 471.9 | 488.87 | |
| Alliance | Francis Falls | 1.93% | 116 | 125.52 | 370.95 | 370.95 | 378.29 | | |
| SDLP | Brian McLernon | 3.97% | 238 | 254.66 | 256.28 | 256.62 | | | |
| Republican Clubs | James McQuaid* | 1.92% | 115 | 117.04 | 118.66 | | | | |
Electorate: 7,638 Valid: 5,996 (78.50%) Spoilt: 233 Quota: 1,000 Turnout: 6,229 (81.55%)

== 1973 Election ==
1973: 2 x SDLP, 2 x Independent Republican, 1 x UUP

Dungannon Area B - 5 seats
| Party | Candidate | FPv% | Count | | | | | | | | | | |
| Party | Candidate | FPv% | 1 | 2 | 3 | 4 | 5 | 6 | 7 | 8 | 9 | 10 | 11 |
|---|---|---|---|---|---|---|---|---|---|---|---|---|---|
| UUP | Thomas Kempton | 27.41% | 1,550 | | | | | | | | | | |
| SDLP | Jim Canning | 15.01% | 849 | 857 | 868 | 891 | 1,024 | | | | | | |
| SDLP | Owen Nugent | 11.05% | 625 | 631 | 648 | 652 | 687 | 713.23 | 714.23 | 742.45 | 753.06 | 777.67 | 853.5 |
| Ind. Republican | James McQuaid | 8.06% | 456 | 457 | 484 | 497 | 500 | 501.83 | 571.83 | 587.44 | 640.44 | 695.44 | 709.44 |
| Ind. Republican | Eugene Lyttle | 4.39% | 248 | 248 | 256 | 268 | 270 | 270.61 | 341.61 | 358.61 | 549.22 | 685.22 | 700.22 |
| SDLP | Brendan Kennedy | 5.13% | 290 | 294 | 295 | 307 | 331 | 374.92 | 417.92 | 505.92 | 521.92 | 561.53 | 652.14 |
| Alliance | Hugh Cullen | 3.11% | 176 | 494 | 497 | 499 | 502 | 503.83 | 509.83 | 538.44 | 543.44 | 556.44 | |
| Unity | Al Molloy | 4.54% | 257 | 259 | 292 | 352 | 360 | 361.22 | 371.22 | 405.22 | 430.22 | | |
| Ind. Republican | Frank Marshall | 4.16% | 235 | 237 | 246 | 259 | 266 | 267.22 | 298.22 | 315.83 | | | |
| Independent | Arthur O'Neill | 3.64% | 206 | 223 | 229 | 259 | 270 | 273.66 | 286.66 | | | | |
| Ind. Republican | Hugh McGrath | 4.10% | 232 | 233 | 235 | 251 | 254 | 254 | | | | | |
| SDLP | J. S. McGarvey | 3.84% | 217 | 218 | 223 | 231 | | | | | | | |
| Ind. Republican | P. O'Neill | 2.86% | 162 | 165 | 197 | | | | | | | | |
| Unity | Anne O'Donnell | 2.69% | 152 | 154 | | | | | | | | | |
Electorate: 7,329 Valid: 5,655 (77.16%) Spoilt: 109 Quota: 943 Turnout: 5,764 (78.65%)
