= Newry and Mourne Area C =

District electoral areas in Newry and Mourne, Northern Ireland

Newry and Mourne Area C was one of the six district electoral areas in Newry and Mourne, Northern Ireland which existed from 1973 to 1985. The district elected four members to Newry and Mourne District Council, and formed part of the South Down constituencies for the Northern Ireland Assembly and UK Parliament.

It was created for the 1973 local elections, and contained the wards of Donaghmore, Drumgath, Rathfriland and Spelga. It was abolished for the 1985 local elections and replaced by the Crotlieve DEA.

== Councillors ==
Election	Councillor (Party)	Councillor (Party)	Councillor (Party)	Councillor (Party)
1981	William Sterritt (DUP)	Violet Cromie (UUP)/ (Independent Unionist)	Nan Sands (SDLP)	Patrick Harper (SDLP)
1977	Edward Walsh (UUP)	Violet Cromie (UUP)/ (Independent Unionist)	Nan Sands (SDLP)	Patrick McAlinden (SDLP)
1973	David Little (Independent Unionist)	Violet Cromie (UUP)/ (Independent Unionist)	Nan Sands (SDLP)	Joseph Brannigan (SDLP)

== 1981 Election ==
1977: 2 x SDLP, 2 x UUP

1981: 2 x SDLP, 1 x UUP, 1 x DUP

1977-1981 Change: DUP gain from UUP

Newry and Mourne Area C - 4 seats
Party	Candidate	FPv%	Count				
Party	Candidate	FPv%	1	2	3	4	5
SDLP	Nan Sands*	24.94%	1,014				
DUP	William Sterritt	22.16%	901				
SDLP	Patrick Harper	15.03%	611	641	817.61		
UUP	Violet Cromie*	15.05%	612	628	629.68	683.68	719.99
UUP	Annie Copeland	10.97%	446	463	463.21	493.41	507.67
Independent	James Fagan	9.71%	395	410	429.74	429.74	
Alliance	Violet Watts	2.14%	87				
Electorate: 5,648 Valid: 4,066 (71.99%) Spoilt: 132 Quota: 814 Turnout: 4,198 (74.33%)

== 1977 Election ==
1973: 2 x SDLP, 2 x Independent Unionist

1977: 2 x SDLP, 2 x UUP

1973-1977 Change: UUP (two seats) gain from Independent Unionist (two seats)

Newry and Mourne Area C - 4 seats
Party	Candidate	FPv%	Count	
Party	Candidate	FPv%	1	2
UUP	Violet Cromie*	31.36%	1,075	
SDLP	Nan Sands*	26.90%	922	
SDLP	Patrick McAlinden	21.30%	730	
UUP	Edward Walsh	15.67%	537	921.18
Republican Clubs	Daniel Mussen	4.78%	164	167.8
Electorate: 5,658 Valid: 3,428 (60.59%) Spoilt: 245 Quota: 686 Turnout: 3,673 (64.92%)

== 1973 Election ==
1973: 2 x SDLP, 2 x Independent Unionist

Newry and Mourne Area C - 4 seats
Party	Candidate	FPv%	Count					
Party	Candidate	FPv%	1	2	3	4	5	6
Ind. Unionist	David Little	27.02%	1,166					
Ind. Unionist	Violet Cromie	19.23%	830	1,118.08				
SDLP	Joseph Brannigan	16.33%	705	705.26	705.52	714.04	834.3	905.3
SDLP	Nan Sands	14.60%	630	630.78	631.82	634.82	667.82	710.82
SDLP	Finian Sands	9.36%	404	404	406.08	413.34	466.4	500.6
Alliance	David Crory	4.59%	198	206.32	285.1	357.48	365.48	
Republican Clubs	Daniel Mussen	4.26%	184	184.26	184.52	187.52		
Republican Clubs	Seamus Murray	2.78%	120	120.26	120.26	120.52		
Alliance	Violet Watts	1.83%	79	81.34	101.62			
Electorate: 6,477 Valid: 4,316 (66.64%) Spoilt: 111 Quota: 864 Turnout: 4,427 (68.35%)
