= Dungannon Area A =

District electoral areas in Dungannon, Northern Ireland

Dungannon Area A was one of the four district electoral areas in Dungannon, Northern Ireland which existed from 1973 to 1985. The district elected five members to Dungannon District Council, and formed part of the Fermanagh and South Tyrone constituencies for the Northern Ireland Assembly and UK Parliament.

It was created for the 1973 local elections, and contained the wards of Augher, Ballygawley, Castlecaulfield, Clogher and Fivemiletown. It was abolished for the 1985 local elections and replaced by the Clogher Valley DEA.

== Councillors ==
Election	Councillor (Party)	Councillor (Party)	Councillor (Party)	Councillor (Party)	Councillor (Party)
1981	William McIlwrath (DUP)	Noel Mulligan (UUP)	Samuel Brush (UUP)	Anthony McGonnell (SDLP)	Seamus Cassidy (Independent Republican)
1977	William McIlwrath (DUP)	Winston Mulligan (UUP)	John Hamilton-Stubber (UUP)	Joseph Higgins (SDLP)	Edward Donnelly (SDLP)
1973	Mervyn Patterson (UUP)	Jack Mulligan (UUP)	John Hamilton-Stubber (UUP)	Joseph Higgins (SDLP)	Vincent Trainor (Unity)

== 1981 Election ==
1977: 2 x UUP, 2 x SDLP, 1 x DUP

1981: 2 x UUP, 1 x SDLP, 1 x DUP, 1 x Independent Republican

1977-1981 Change: Independent Republican gain from SDLP

Dungannon Area A - 5 seats
Party	Candidate	FPv%	Count					
Party	Candidate	FPv%	1	2	3	4	5	6
Ind. Republican	Seamus Cassidy*	17.81%	1,057					
UUP	Noel Mulligan	13.43%	797	797.1	1,146.1			
DUP	William McIlwrath*	9.82%	583	583.1	620.1	630.45	1,092.45	
UUP	Samuel Brush	10.67%	633	633.5	784.5	927.15	1,033.05	
SDLP	Anthony McGonnell	14.98%	889	923.1	925.1	925.1	927.1	948.1
SDLP	John Monaghan	14.43%	856	885	886	886.45	886.45	891.45
DUP	Frederick Burrows	9.61%	570	570	579	580.35		
UUP	Winston Mulligan*	9.25%	549	549				
Electorate: 6,624 Valid: 5,934 (89.58%) Spoilt: 92 Quota: 990 Turnout: 6,026 (90.97%)

== 1977 Election ==
1973: 3 x UUP, 1 x SDLP, 1 x Unity

1977: 2 x UUP, 2 x SDLP, 1 x DUP

1973-1977 Change: SDLP and DUP gain from UUP and Unity

Dungannon Area A - 5 seats
Party	Candidate	FPv%	Count							
Party	Candidate	FPv%	1	2	3	4	5	6	7	8
SDLP	Joseph Higgins*	17.60%	921							
UUP	Winston Mulligan	10.26%	537	579	665	1,151				
UUP	John Hamilton-Stubber*	13.49%	706	804	836	900				
DUP	William McIlwrath	9.77%	511	528	778	809	1,009			
SDLP	Edward Donnelly	12.63%	661	695	695	695	698	700	734.85	735.85
Independent	Brian McKenna	13.23%	692	710	714	715	717	722	729.4	733.4
UUP	Mervyn Patterson*	10.67%	558	566	592					
UUUP	Ian McCormick	7.66%	401	414						
Independent	Jack Johnston	4.68%	245							
Electorate: 6,660 Valid: 5,232 (78.56%) Spoilt: 237 Quota: 873 Turnout: 5,469 (82.12%)

== 1973 Election ==
1973: 3 x UUP, 1 x SDLP, 1 x Unity

Dungannon Area A - 5 seats
Party	Candidate	FPv%	Count								
Party	Candidate	FPv%	1	2	3	4	5	6	7	8	9
UUP	Mervyn Patterson	20.26%	1,129								
UUP	John Hamilton-Stubber	18.68%	1,041								
UUP	Jack Mulligan	13.85%	772	958.49							
SDLP	Joseph Higgins	12.38%	690	690	691.36	704.36	718.53	718.87	730.87	769.76	1,169.76
Unity	Vincent Trainor	11.27%	628	628	628.68	634.68	641.68	641.85	698.85	712.23	728.23
Unity	Bernadette Hughes	6.10%	340	340	342.38	347.55	349.72	349.89	539.89	544.74	575.74
SDLP	Joseph Farrell	7.45%	415	415.17	415.51	423.51	425.85	426.36	437.36	463.06	
Alliance	Arthur Noble	1.76%	98	98.51	175.35	191.69	304.37	317.46	319.46		
Unity	William McDonald	4.92%	274	274	274.34	274.68	275.68	275.85			
Alliance	Norman Kyle	1.88%	105	106.7	131.52	161.88					
Alliance	P. R. Mallon	1.44%	80	81.36	85.78						
Electorate: 6,772 Valid: 5,572 (82.28%) Spoilt: 89 Quota: 929 Turnout: 5,661 (83.59%)
