= Dungannon Area C =

District electoral areas in Dungannon, Northern Ireland

Dungannon Area C was one of the four district electoral areas in Dungannon, Northern Ireland which existed from 1973 to 1985. The district elected five members to Dungannon District Council, and formed part of the Fermanagh and South Tyrone constituencies for the Northern Ireland Assembly and UK Parliament.

It was created for the 1973 local elections, and contained the wards of Aughnacloy, Benburb, Caledon, Killyman and Moy. It was abolished for the 1985 local elections and replaced by the Blackwater DEA.

== Councillors ==
Election	Councillor (Party)	Councillor (Party)	Councillor (Party)	Councillor (Party)	Councillor (Party)
1981	James Ewing (DUP)	Derek Irwin (UUP)	Jim Brady (UUP)	John Taggart (UUP)	Patrick Daly (SDLP)
1977	Wilfred Dilworth (UUP)	Derek Irwin (UUP)	Jim Brady (UUP)	William Buchanan (UUP)	Patrick Daly (SDLP)
1973	Wilfred Dilworth (UUP)	Derek Irwin (UUP)	Jim Brady (UUP)	William Buchanan (UUP)	Patrick Daly (SDLP)

== 1981 Election ==
1977: 3 x UUP, 1 x SDLP, 1 x DUP

1981: 4 x UUP, 1 x SDLP

1977-1981 Change: DUP gain from UUP

Dungannon Area C - 5 seats
Party	Candidate	FPv%	Count					
Party	Candidate	FPv%	1	2	3	4	5	6
SDLP	Patrick Daly*	23.02%	1,324					
UUP	Derek Irwin*	17.06%	981					
DUP	James Ewing	13.53%	778	788.8	848.8	867.2	868.6	1,054.28
UUP	John Taggart	11.25%	647	669.2	712.4	728.8	730.18	906.1
UUP	Jim Brady*	9.93%	571	599.8	631	653.8	669.14	848.06
DUP	Norman Lockhart	10.14%	583	585.4	620.4	638.2	638.82	664.5
Ind. Unionist	Wilfred Dilworth*	9.70%	558	570.6	602.8	623	623.64	
Independent	William Lucas	1.81%	104	383	386			
UUUP	James McNeill	3.56%	205	212.8				
Electorate: 7,091 Valid: 5,751 (81.10%) Spoilt: 125 Quota: 959 Turnout: 5,876 (82.87%)

== 1977 Election ==
1973: 4 x UUP, 1 x SDLP

1977: 4 x UUP, 1 x SDLP

1973-1977 Change: No change

Dungannon Area C - 5 seats
Party	Candidate	FPv%	Count		
Party	Candidate	FPv%	1	2	3
UUP	Wilfred Dilworth*	22.08%	1,182		
UUP	Derek Irwin*	21.30%	1,140		
SDLP	Patrick Daly*	18.31%	980		
UUP	William Buchanan*	12.89%	690	894.12	
UUP	Jim Brady*	14.85%	795	876.27	1,117.17
SDLP	Mary McKinney	5.51%	295	296.08	297.18
Independent	Anthony Byrne	5.06%	271	272.89	275.97
Electorate: 7,175 Valid: 5,353 (74.61%) Spoilt: 277 Quota: 893 Turnout: 5,630 (78.47%)

== 1973 Election ==
1973: 4 x UUP, 1 x SDLP

Dungannon Area C - 5 seats
Party	Candidate	FPv%	Count							
Party	Candidate	FPv%	1	2	3	4	5	6	7	8
UUP	Derek Irwin	21.26%	1,291							
UUP	Wilfred Dilworth	18.03%	1,095							
UUP	Jim Brady	13.90%	844	1,084.24						
UUP	William Buchanan	13.85%	841	863.26	936.27	958.04	1,025.36			
SDLP	Patrick Daly	12.74%	774	774.42	774.56	783.56	783.62	783.82	978.89	1,056.89
Independent	Anthony Byrne	5.55%	337	337	337.14	342.21	342.21	342.37	350.37	492.37
Alliance	R. F. Hobson	5.71%	347	353.09	354.42	413.49	414.09	424.13	429.13	436.13
Unity	John McAnespie	3.67%	223	223	223	225	225.12	225.16	237.16	
SDLP	Matt Hegarty	3.52%	214	214	214.07	224.07	224.13	224.13		
Alliance	Jim Boyd	1.76%	107	107.84	108.4					
Electorate: 7,218 Valid: 6,073 (84.14%) Spoilt: 72 Quota: 1,013 Turnout: 6,145 (85.13%)
