= Sean Hollywood =

Irish actor, politician, hurler and Gaelic footballer

Anthony Gerard Sean Hollywood (12 December 1943 – 19 July 1998) was an Irish actor, politician, hurler and footballer.

Hollywood studied at Queen's University Belfast and University College Dublin while playing hurling for Clan Uladh and County Down, and football for Newry Bosco GFC. He first entered politics campaigning for Paddy O'Hanlon of the Nationalist Party at the 1969 Northern Ireland general election in South Armagh. He became involved in the civil rights movement, and following Bloody Sunday, he took the leading role in organising a major demonstration in Newry, focusing on the need to avoid any possibility of violence or of being outmanoeuvred. Although declared illegal, the march was a success, attracting about 100,000 people.

Hollywood joined the Social Democratic and Labour Party (SDLP) on its foundation, and was elected to Newry and Mourne District Council at the 1973 Northern Ireland local elections. He stood for the party in South Down at the February 1974 general election, and then again in October losing to Enoch Powell. For the Northern Ireland Constitutional Convention election in 1975, he stood for North Down, but was again defeated. Concerned that the SDLP was moving to the right, he left politics, but remained publicly supportive of his former party.

Working as a teacher at St Colman's College, Hollywood continued his sporting involvement as a founding player and later manager of the Newry Shamrocks GAC. Long an amateur actor, in later life, Hollywood became best known for running the Newpoint Players acting group, which won numerous awards and launched the careers of John and Susan Lynch, and Gerard Murphy. Following Hollywood's sudden death in 1998 at age 54, Newry's arts centre was renamed in his honour and he was one of seven people nominated as a candidate for Newry's "greatest ever person" in a 2014 debate between local historians.
