= 1985 Newry and Mourne District Council election =

Local govt election in Northern Ireland

← 1981	15 May 1985	1989 →

All 30 seats to Newry and Mourne District Council 16 seats needed for a majority
	First party	Second party	Third party
Party	SDLP	UUP	Sinn Féin
Seats won	14	7	5
Seat change	▼2	▲1	▲5
	Fourth party	Fifth party	Sixth party
Party	DUP	Irish Independence	Ind. Nationalist
Seats won	2	1	1
Seat change	0	▼3	▲1
	Seventh party
Party	Anti H-Block
Seats won	0
Seat change	▼2

Elections to Newry and Mourne District Council were held on 15 May 1985 on the same day as the other Northern Irish local government elections. The election used five district electoral areas to elect a total of 30 councillors.

== Election results ==
Newry and Mourne District Council Election Result 1985
Party	Seats	Gains	Losses	Net gain/loss	Seats %	Votes %	Votes	+/−
SDLP	14	0	2	▼2	46.7	40.9	14,013	▼0.8
UUP	7	1	0	▲1	23.3	20.2	6,931	▲1.5
Sinn Féin	5	5	0	▲5	16.7	18.5	6,347	New
DUP	2	0	0	0	6.7	7.8	2,772	▼1.7
Ind. Nationalist	1	1	0	▲1	3.3	4.4	1,510	▲3.1
Irish Independence	1	0	3	▼3	3.3	4.2	1,461	▼7.2
Workers' Party	0	0	0	0	0.0	1.5	498	▼0.5
Alliance	0	0	0	0	0.0	1.0	356	▼2.6
Independent	0	0	0	0	0.0	0.7	258	▼2.6
Ind. Republican	0	0	0	0	0.0	0.6	187	▼1.6
Independent Labour	0	0	0	0	0.0	0.1	30	0.0

Note: "Votes" are the first preference votes.

== Districts summary ==
Results of the Newry and Mourne District Council election, 1985 by district
Ward	%	Cllrs	%	Cllrs	%	Cllrs	%	Cllrs	%	Cllrs	%	Cllrs	Total Cllrs
Ward	SDLP		UUP		Sinn Féin		DUP		IIP		Others		Total Cllrs
Crotlieve	54.2	4	18.0	2	0.0	0	6.9	0	0.0	0	20.9	1	7
Newry Town	45.0	4	12.6	1	19.3	1	0.0	0	15.3	1	7.8	0	7
Slieve Gullion	44.8	3	0.0	0	47.5	2	0.0	0	4.6	0	3.1	0	5
The Fews	30.9	2	35.0	2	18.9	1	7.9	1	0.8	0	6.5	0	6
The Mournes	26.6	1	34.2	2	12.8	1	26.4	1	0.0	0	0.0	0	5
Total	40.9	14	20.2	7	18.5	5	7.8	2	4.2	1	8.4	1	30

== District results ==
=== Crotlieve ===
1985: 4 x SDLP, 2 x UUP, 1 x Independent Nationalist

Crotlieve - 7 seats
Party	Candidate	FPv%	Count								
Party	Candidate	FPv%	1	2	3	4	5	6	7	8	9
SDLP	P. J. Bradley*	22.09%	1,717								
SDLP	Jim McCart*	11.63%	904	1,138.08							
UUP	Violet Cromie*	10.92%	849	855.6	855.6	856.04	1,238.04				
SDLP	Brian Mulligan*	8.17%	635	781.08	826.65	861.05	863.05	864.59	1,079.59		
SDLP	Patrick Harper*	7.22%	561	732.6	761.74	785.36	785.36	785.36	1,003.97		
UUP	William McCoy	7.04%	547	548.76	549.38	560.13	699.13	961.7	974.7		
Ind. Nationalist	Ciaran Mussen	8.77%	682	708.84	715.35	754.43	755.43	755.43	781.36	800.36	804.7
Ind. Nationalist	Sean Tinnelly	7.74%	602	613.88	616.36	718.07	718.07	718.07	760.02	790.02	793.43
SDLP	Liam Trainor*	5.06%	393	500.36	568.25	657.02	657.02	657.79			
DUP	William Sterritt*	6.91%	537	537	537	539					
Independent	Francis Price	2.26%	176	190.96	194.68						
Workers' Party	Henry Smyth	1.81%	141	149.36	153.7						
Independent Labour	Johnny Ward	0.39%	30	33.52	35.07						
Electorate: 12,132 Valid: 7,774 (64.08%) Spoilt: 231 Quota: 972 Turnout: 8,005 (65.98%)

=== Newry Town ===
1985: 4 x SDLP, 1 x Sinn Féin, 1 x IIP, 1 x UUP

Newry Town - 7 seats
Party	Candidate	FPv%	Count								
Party	Candidate	FPv%	1	2	3	4	5	6	7	8	9
Irish Independence	Eugene Markey*	13.52%	1,003								
UUP	William McCaigue*	12.64%	938								
SDLP	Sean Gallogly	12.37%	918	921.08	922.15	930.15					
SDLP	Arthur Ruddy*	12.02%	892	896.06	902.27	927.23	929.07				
SDLP	Patrick McElroy*	7.92%	588	592.13	603.34	624.28	626.56	661.65	727.55	743.76	989.76
Sinn Féin	Brendan Curran	9.49%	704	708.9	713.04	734.91	734.91	740.19	778.54	879.5	908.89
SDLP	Thomas McGrath*	7.52%	558	563.25	570.25	583.4	584.52	657.37	696.37	710.79	841.43
Sinn Féin	Sean Mathers	5.12%	380	382.24	383.24	387.8	387.84	391.98	401.05	609.59	614.63
SDLP	John McArdle	5.16%	383	384.26	387.26	398.66	400.02	430.35	471.19	479.33	
Sinn Féin	Deborah Morgan	4.68%	347	350.57	354.57	358.39	358.39	367.53	380.95		
Ind. Nationalist	James McKevitt	3.05%	226	229.85	261.06	292.99	294.31	342.24			
Workers' Party	Tom Moore	3.58%	266	269.29	272.29	282.46	283.9				
Irish Independence	Freddie Kearns*	1.83%	136	167.92	174.2						
Independent	Noel Sloan	1.10%	82	83.12							
Electorate: 12,788 Valid: 7,421 (58.03%) Spoilt: 237 Quota: 928 Turnout: 7,658 (59.88%)

=== Slieve Gullion ===
1985: 3 x SDLP, 2 x Sinn Féin

Slieve Gullion - 5 seats
Party	Candidate	FPv%	Count				
Party	Candidate	FPv%	1	2	3	4	5
Sinn Féin	Jim McAllister	20.36%	1,199				
SDLP	Pat Toner*	18.24%	1,074				
SDLP	Owen Kelly*	13.38%	788	821.44	854.72	944.83	986.83
Sinn Féin	Eamon Larkin	12.08%	711	738.93	741.73	744.92	980.72
SDLP	Noel McKevitt	13.20%	777	779.66	811.02	821.37	954.03
Sinn Féin	Patrick Murphy	10.58%	623	738.33	742.65	774.55	856.74
Irish Independence	Jim Murphy*	4.55%	268	281.49	288.93	307.36	
Sinn Féin	Sarah Murphy	4.43%	261	269.74	271.26	283.67	
Ind. Republican	Brian Woods	3.18%	187	198.59	200.67		
Electorate: 8,395 Valid: 5,888 (70.14%) Spoilt: 211 Quota: 982 Turnout: 6,099 (72.65%)

=== The Fews ===
1985: 2 x UUP, 2 x SDLP, 1 x Sinn Féin, 1 x DUP

The Fews - 6 seats
Party	Candidate	FPv%	Count							
Party	Candidate	FPv%	1	2	3	4	5	6	7	8
Sinn Féin	Brendan Lewis	18.94%	1,302							
SDLP	James Savage*	13.25%	911	1,011						
UUP	Andy Moffett*	11.16%	767	768.2	779.6	1,051.6				
UUP	Danny Kennedy	10.91%	750	750.4	754.8	810.2	828.7	863.7	1,300.7	
SDLP	Nan Sands*	11.10%	763	803	844	846	846.25	947.25	951.45	955.45
DUP	Gordon Heslip	7.90%	543	543	544	589	593.5	599.9	686.15	917.15
SDLP	John McElherron	6.55%	450	525.2	583.2	583.2	583.2	789.8	792.8	793.8
UUP	David McMullan	7.19%	494	494.8	495.2	508.2	552.7	562.7		
Alliance	Victor Frizell	5.18%	356	387.6	428.2	428.2	428.2			
UUP	Florence Henning	5.72%	393	393.4	393.4					
Workers' Party	Brian Mulligan	1.32%	91	109.4						
Irish Independence	Francis McCamley*	0.79%	54	104						
Electorate: 9,873 Valid: 6,874 (69.62%) Spoilt: 141 Quota: 983 Turnout: 7,015 (71.05%)

=== The Mournes ===
1985: 2 x UUP, 1 x SDLP, 1 x DUP, 1 x Sinn Féin

The Mournes - 5 seats
Party	Candidate	FPv%	Count					
Party	Candidate	FPv%	1	2	3	4	5	6
DUP	George Graham*	22.20%	1,422					
UUP	William Russell*	21.71%	1,391					
UUP	Arthur Coulter*	12.52%	802	935.25	1,231.72			
SDLP	Colum Murnion*	16.52%	1,058	1,060.5	1,060.96	1,062.31	1,638.31	
Sinn Féin	Patrick Young	12.80%	820	820.25	820.48	820.63	866.86	1,134.86
DUP	William Burns	4.21%	270	485.5	503.9	655.1	661.61	673.61
SDLP	Anne Marie Cunningham*	10.04%	643	644	646.3	649.3		
Electorate: 9,530 Valid: 6,406 (67.22%) Spoilt: 189 Quota: 1,068 Turnout: 6,595 (69.20%)
