= George Graham (Northern Ireland politician) =

Northern Irish politician

Member of Newry and Mourne District Council
- In office 15 May 1985 – 1991
- Preceded by: District created
- Succeeded by: William Burns
- Constituency: The Mournes
- In office 1975 – 15 May 1985
- Preceded by: Norman Gordon
- Succeeded by: District abolished
- Constituency: Newry and Mourne Area A

Member of the Northern Ireland Assembly for South Down
- In office 20 October 1982 – 1986
- Preceded by: Assembly reconvened
- Succeeded by: Assembly dissolved

Personal details
- Born: 14 December 1945
- Died: 21 February 2012 (aged 66)
- Party: Independent Unionist (1989 - 1996; 1998); Democratic Unionist (until 1989)
- Other political affiliations: PUP (1996 - 1998)

George Graham (c.14 December 1945 – 21 February 2012) was a Northern Irish unionist politician and estate agent who was most prominent during his time with the Democratic Unionist Party (DUP).

== Background ==
Graham lived in Kilkeel, where he operated his own estate agency. He was a prominent figure in the local Orange Order.

Graham was co-opted onto Newry and Mourne District Council in 1975, becoming that body's first DUP member and in 1982 he was elected council chairman by the controlling Social Democratic and Labour Party. He was elected to the Northern Ireland Assembly at the 1982 election to represent South Down and remained a member until the Assembly shut down in 1986, serving as a member of the Agriculture, Finance and Personnel and Health and Social Services committees.

Graham came to attention in the summer of 1985 when, in response to a call from local DUP councillor Ethel Smyth, he accompanied Rev. Ivan Foster and a group from the Third Force to join a banned loyalist parade attempting to march through the village of Castlewellan. The loyalists clashed with the Royal Ulster Constabulary although the ban was upheld and both Graham and Foster were arrested for their involvement.

Graham ran afoul of the DUP leadership in 1987 when he continued to attend council meetings despite the party having adopted a policy of abstentionism in response to the Anglo-Irish Agreement. Representing his hometown of Kilkeel, he reasoned that he was of more value opposing the Agreement from within the council rather than following the party policy, which he felt was not an effective protest. He finally left the DUP in January 1989 and was re-elected in May under the label "Protestant". He resigned his council seat in 1991.

Graham would later join the Progressive Unionist Party and unsuccessfully ran in South Down as their lead candidate in the 1996 Forum election. He subsequently ran in the 1998 Assembly election in South Down as an independent Unionist but he was eliminated on the first count.

He died on 21 February 2012 after succumbing to an illness in hospital. He had been in failing health for a number of years.

Northern Ireland Assembly (1982)
| New assembly | MPA for South Down; 1982–1986 | Assembly abolished |
