= John Patrick Donaghy =

John Patrick Donaghy (died 2 October 1987) was an Irish nationalist politician and a physician.

Born into a Roman Catholic family, Donaghy studied medicine at Queen's University Belfast, graduating in 1943, and working at the Mater Infirmorum Hospital in Belfast from 1948 until his retirement in 1984. He also lectured at Queen's University.

From 1953 until 1969, Donaghy served in the Senate of Northern Ireland, first as an independent, then for the Nationalist Party. There, he attempted to promote the Irish language. In his spare time, he served as a leading member of the Down and Connor Catholic Marriage Advisory Council, the Catholic Doctors' Guild of Saint Luke, Cosmos and Damian and the Irish Association of Catholic Doctors. Also a commissioner of the Catholic Boy Scouts of Ireland, he was awarded the Pro Ecclesia et Pontifice medal in 1986.
