= Independent Republican (Ireland) =

Political title used in Ireland

Independent Republican (Irish: Poblachtach Daonlathach) was a political title sometimes used by Irish republicans when contesting elections in the Republic of Ireland and Northern Ireland.

== History ==
- The 1916 Rising
- The Anglo-Irish Treaty
- The Troubles
- Independent Nationalist

== The Republic of Ireland ==
- John Carroll, local politician from Offaly, ex Sinn Féin
- Fr. Patrick Ryan - Munster European Election 1989

== Northern Ireland ==
- Gerry McGeough
- Frank Maguire - Fermanagh South Tyrone
- Bobby Sands - Fermanagh South Tyrone
- Anthony Mulvey - Mid Ulster
- Tom Mitchell -Mid Ulster
- Bernadette Devlin - Mid Ulster
