= Newry and Mourne District Council =

Former local council in Northern Ireland

Coordinates: 54.176°N 6.256°W

Newry and Mourne District
- Area: 902 km^{2} (348 sq mi); Ranked 3rd of 26
- District HQ: Newry
- Catholic: 79.4%
- Protestant: 18%
- Country: Northern Ireland
- Sovereign state: United Kingdom
- Councillors: MLAs Newry and Armagh & South Down Sinn Féin: 5 SDLP: 3 DUP: 2; MPs Mickey Brady (Sinn Féin) Chris Hazzard (Sinn Féin)
- Website: www.newryandmourne.gov.uk

Newry and Mourne District Council (Irish: Comhairle an Iúir agus Mhúrn) was a local council in Northern Ireland. It merged with Down District Council in May 2015 under local government reorganisation in Northern Ireland to become Newry, Mourne and Down District Council.

It included much of the south of County Armagh and the south of County Down and had a population of over 99,000. Council headquarters were in Newry, the largest settlement and only city in the area; it has a population of 28,850. Other towns in the council area included Crossmaglen and Bessbrook in County Armagh and Warrenpoint, Rostrevor, Hilltown, Annalong and Kilkeel (an important fishing port) in Down.

The council was formed in 1973 under the Local Government Act (Northern Ireland) 1972. Its area was formed from Kilkeel, Newry and Warrenpoint urban districts and Kilkeel and Newry No. 1 rural districts in County Down, and from Newry No. 2 Rural District in County Armagh. From 1973 to 1985, the council area consisted of six electoral areas. In 1985, this was reduced to five electoral areas: Crotlieve, Fews, Newry Town, Slieve Gullion and The Mournes. One of its 30 wards, Rathfriland, was transferred to Banbridge Council in 1993. At the elections of 2005, 30 members were elected from the following political parties: 14 Sinn Féin, 9 Social Democratic and Labour Party (SDLP), 3 Ulster Unionist Party (UUP), 1 Democratic Unionist Party (DUP), 2 Independents and 1 UK Independence Party (UKIP).

== 2014 criticism ==
In April 2014 the Equality Commission for Northern Ireland criticised Newry and Mourne District Council for retaining the name of a children's play park called after the IRA hunger striker, Raymond McCreesh. McCreesh had been arrested with a weapon used in the infamous Kingsmill massacre of Protestant workmen. Twenty nationalist councillors – including six (non-republican) SDLP representatives – voted to uphold his name in the December 2012 vote, but unionists campaigned against the decision. The Equality Commission concluded that their investigation has found that little consideration appears to have been given by the council to the impact its decision, in this instance, might have on Ulster Protestants/unionists or to the damage it might cause to good relations

== 2011 election results ==
Map of the district's DEAs from 1993 to 2014

In elections for the Westminster Parliament and the Northern Ireland Assembly it is split between the Newry & Armagh constituency and the South Down constituency.

Party		seats	change +/−
•	Sinn Féin	14	+1
•	Social Democratic and Labour Party	9	=
•	Ulster Unionist Party	3	=
•	Democratic Unionist Party	1	−1
•	Green Party in Northern Ireland	1	=
•	UK Independence Party	1	+1
•	Independent	2	=

== 2005 election results ==
Party		seats	change +/−
•	Sinn Féin	13	=
•	Social Democratic and Labour Party	9	−1
•	Ulster Unionist Party	3	−1
•	Democratic Unionist Party	2	+1
•	Green Party in Northern Ireland	1	+1
•	Independent	2	=

- includes Henry Reilly, a member of the UK Independence Party (UKIP) who defected in February 2007 from the Ulster Unionist Party (UUP).

== Mayor of Newry ==
The title Mayor of Newry replace the office of Chairman of Newry & Mourne District Council after Newry's elevation to city status in 2002.

- 2003: Frank Feely, Social Democratic and Labour Party
- 2003 – 04: Jackie Patterson, Independent
- 2004 – 05: Henry Reilly, Ulster Unionist Party
- 2005 – 06: Pat McGinn, Sinn Féin
- 2006 – 07: Michael Carr, Social Democratic and Labour Party
- 2007 – 08: Michael Cole, Social Democratic and Labour Party
- 2008 – 09: Colman Burns, Sinn Féin
- 2009 – 10: John Feehan Social Democratic and Labour Party
- 2010 – 11: Mick Murphy, Sinn Féin
- 2011 – 12: Charlie Casey Sinn Féin
- 2012 – 13: John McArdle Social Democratic and Labour Party
- 2013 – 14: Michael Ruane Sinn Féin
- 2014 – 15: Dáire Hughes Sinn Féin

== Deputy Mayor of Newry ==
- 2005 – 06: Michael Carr, Social Democratic and Labour Party
- 2006 – 07: Martin Connolly, Sinn Féin
- 2007 – 08: Charlie Casey, Sinn Féin
- 2008 – 09: Isaac Hannah, Ulster Unionist Party
- 2009 – 10: Charlie Casey, Sinn Féin
- 2010 – 11: Karen McKevitt, Social Democratic and Labour Party
- 2011 – 12: Geraldine Donnelly, Social Democratic and Labour Party
- 2012 – 13: Patrick McDonald, Sinn Féin
- 2013 – 14: David Taylor, Ulster Unionist Party
- 2014 – 15: Brain Quinn, Social Democratic and Labour Party

== Review of Public Administration ==
Under the Review of Public Administration (RPA) the council was due to merge with Down District Council in 2011 to form a single council for the enlarged area totalling 1539 km^{2} and a population of 150,886. The next election was due to take place in May 2009, but on 25 April 2008, Shaun Woodward, Secretary of State for Northern Ireland announced that the scheduled 2009 district council elections were to be postponed until the introduction of the eleven new councils in 2011. The merger ultimately took place in April 2015 to form Newry City, Mourne and Down District Council.

== Population ==
The area covered by Newry and Mourne District Council had a population of 99,480 residents according to the 2011 Northern Ireland census.

== See also ==
- Local government in Northern Ireland
- Viscount Newry and Mourne is the courtesy title of the Earl of Kilmorey.
