= Independent Nationalist =

Political description

Independent Nationalist (Irish: Náisiúnach Neamhspleách) is a political title frequently used by Irish nationalists when contesting elections to the House of Commons of the United Kingdom Great Britain and Ireland not as members of the Irish Parliamentary Party, in the late nineteenth and early twentieth centuries.

In the decades leading up to Irish Independence, most Independent Nationalist candidates were either the Healyite Nationalists, supporters of Timothy Michael Healy, or the O'Brienite Nationalists, supporters of William O'Brien.

Some others were elected as Independent Nationalists outside of the above groupings, such as Timothy Harrington (1900 and 1906), Joseph Nolan (1900), D. D. Sheehan (1906), and Laurence Ginnell (in both the January and December 1910 elections).

William Redmond and James Cosgrave were elected to Dáil Éireann as Independent Nationalists in 1923, before going on to form the National League Party.

Later in the twentieth century, Michael O'Neill was elected to the House of Commons as an Independent Nationalist in 1951. John Hume, Paddy O'Hanlon, and Ivan Cooper were elected to the Northern Ireland House of Commons as Independent Nationalists in 1969; they formed the Social Democratic and Labour Party in the following year.

In the Northern Ireland Assembly, Justin McNulty sat as an Independent Nationalist for a period in 2024 after being suspended from the SDLP on 4 February for leaving the inaugural sitting of the restored Executive early in order to manage the Laois county football team in a GAA game. On 20 August, he had the SDLP whip restored.

== See also ==
- Independent Republican (Ireland)
