= 2005 Magherafelt District Council election =

Local govt election in Northern Ireland

← 2001	5 May 2005	2011 →

All 16 seats to Magherafelt District Council 9 seats needed for a majority
	First party	Second party	Third party
Party	Sinn Féin	DUP	SDLP
Seats won	8	4	2
Seat change	▲1	▲1	▼1
	Fourth party	Fifth party
Party	UUP	Independent
Seats won	2	0
Seat change	0	▼1
- Party with the most votes by district.

Elections to Magherafelt District Council were held on 5 May 2005 on the same day as the other Northern Irish local government elections. The election used three district electoral areas to elect a total of 16 councillors.

== Election results ==
Magherafelt District Council Election Result 2005
Party	Seats	Gains	Losses	Net gain/loss	Seats %	Votes %	Votes	+/−
Sinn Féin	8	1	0	▲1	50.0	46.7	9,836	▲2.5
DUP	4	1	0	▲1	25.0	23.2	4,883	▲2.6
SDLP	2	0	1	▼1	12.5	18.5	3,895	▼1.4
UUP	2	0	0	0	12.5	6.2	1,308	▼4.2
Independent	0	0	1	▼1	0.0	4.9	1,035	▲0.5
Workers' Party	0	0	0	0	0.0	0.5	102	0.0

Note: "Votes" are the first preference votes.

== Districts summary ==
Results of the Magherafelt District Council election, 2005 by district
Ward	%	Cllrs	%	Cllrs	%	Cllrs	%	Cllrs	%	Cllrs	Total Cllrs
Ward	Sinn Féin		DUP		SDLP		UUP		Others		Total Cllrs
Magherafelt Town	35.0	2	35.2	2	20.3	1	9.6	1	0.0	0	6
Moyola	48.6	3	23.8	1	11.6	0	9.4	1	6.6	0	5
Sperrin	56.6	3	10.8	1	22.9	1	0.0	0	9.7	0	5
Total	46.7	8	23.2	4	18.5	2	6.2	2	5.4	0	16

== District results ==
=== Magherafelt Town ===
2001: 2 x DUP, 2 x Sinn Féin, 1 x SDLP, 1 x UUP
2005: 3 x DUP, 1 x Sinn Féin, 1 x SDLP, 1 x UUP
2001-2005 Change: No change

Magherafelt Town - 6 seats
Party	Candidate	FPv%	Count					
Party	Candidate	FPv%	1	2	3	4	5	6
DUP	William McCrea*	31.69%	2,286					
Sinn Féin	Peter Bateson	17.61%	1,270					
DUP	Paul McLean*	3.47%	250	1,395.76				
UUP	George Shiels*	9.58%	691	773.88	1,124.12			
Sinn Féin	Sean McPeake	11.73%	846	846.56	846.78	927.15	927.15	1,300.15
SDLP	Jim Campbell	12.99%	937	941.48	949.84	959.34	1,009.5	1,034.37
SDLP	Brendan Scott	7.26%	524	525.12	528.42	532.79	574.97	604.03
Sinn Féin	Seamus O'Brien*	5.67%	409	409	409.44	553.84	554.03	
Electorate: 10,439 Valid: 7,213 (69.10%) Spoilt: 129 Quota: 1,031 Turnout: 7,342 (70.33%)

=== Moyola ===
2001: 2 x Sinn Féin, 1 x DUP, 1 x UUP, 1 x SDLP
2005: 3 x Sinn Féin, 1 x DUP, 1 x UUP
2001-2005 Change: Sinn Féin gain from SDLP

Moyola - 5 seats
Party	Candidate	FPv%	Count					
Party	Candidate	FPv%	1	2	3	4	5	6
DUP	Thomas Catherwood*	23.84%	1,557					
Sinn Féin	James O'Neill*	18.40%	1,202					
Sinn Féin	Oliver Hughes*	17.44%	1,139					
UUP	John Crawford	9.45%	617	889.49	889.49	1,229.49		
Sinn Féin	Ian Milne	12.72%	831	831.31	933.19	938.37	938.37	980.21
SDLP	Elizabeth Foster	11.64%	760	764.03	767.18	803.06	934.06	936.78
Independent	John Junkin*	6.52%	426	603.94	604.84			
Electorate: 8,754 Valid: 6,532 (74.62%) Spoilt: 87 Quota: 1,089 Turnout: 6,619 (75.61%)

=== Sperrin ===
2001: 3 x Sinn Féin, 1 x SDLP, 1 x Independent
2005: 3 x Sinn Féin, 1 x SDLP, 1 x DUP
2001-2005 Change: DUP gain from Independent

Sperrin - 5 seats
Party	Candidate	FPv%	Count					
Party	Candidate	FPv%	1	2	3	4	5	6
Sinn Féin	Patrick Groogan*	19.09%	1,396					
Sinn Féin	Kathleen McEldowney	15.52%	1,135	1,139	1,233.2			
Sinn Féin	John Kerr*	15.27%	1,117	1,123	1,159.48	1,607.48		
DUP	Anne Forde	10.80%	790	795	795.12	795.12	795.12	1,257.12
SDLP	Kathleen Lagan*	13.66%	999	1,036	1,043.08	1,044.88	1,136.88	1,203.88
SDLP	Hugh Kelly	9.23%	675	697	709.72	727.28	741.28	762.28
Independent	Robert Montgomery*	8.33%	609	615	616.2	618.2	623.2	
Sinn Féin	Hugh Mullan*	6.71%	491	496	509.2			
Workers' Party	Francis Donnelly	1.39%	102					
Electorate: 9,314 Valid: 7,314 (78.53%) Spoilt: 107 Quota: 1,220 Turnout: 7,421 (79.68%)
