= 1989 Magherafelt District Council election =

Local govt election in Northern Ireland

← 1985	17 May 1989	1993 →

All 15 seats to Magherafelt District Council 8 seats needed for a majority
	First party	Second party	Third party
Party	SDLP	UUP	DUP
Seats won	4	4	3
Seat change	0	▲1	▼1
	Fourth party	Fifth party
Party	Sinn Féin	Ind. Nationalist
Seats won	3	1
Seat change	▼1	▲1

Elections to Magherafelt District Council were held on 17 May 1989, on the same day as the other Northern Irish local government elections. The election used three district electoral areas to elect a total of 15 councillors.

== Election results ==
Magherafelt District Council Election Result 1989
Party	Seats	Gains	Losses	Net gain/loss	Seats %	Votes %	Votes	+/−
SDLP	4	0	0	0	26.7	26.7	4,790	▼1.5
UUP	4	1	0	▲1	26.7	20.7	3,730	▲1.4
DUP	3	0	1	▼1	20.0	23.4	4,197	▼0.6
Sinn Féin	3	0	1	▼1	25.0	22.1	3,965	▼3.9
Ind. Nationalist	1	1	0	▲1	0.0	3.8	691	▲3.8
Workers' Party	0	0	0	0	0.0	3.3	587	▲2.0

Note: "Votes" are the first preference votes.

== Districts summary ==
Results of the Magherafelt District Council election, 1989 by district
Ward	%	Cllrs	%	Cllrs	%	Cllrs	%	Cllrs	%	Cllrs	Total Cllrs
Ward	SDLP		UUP		DUP		Sinn Féin		Others		Total Cllrs
Magherafelt Town	27.4	1	18.5	1	36.7	2	15.9	1	1.5	0	5
Moyola	21.3	1	29.5	2	21.5	1	24.2	1	3.5	0	5
Sperrin	31.2	2	14.4	1	10.8	0	26.6	1	17.0	1	5
Total	26.7	4	20.7	4	23.4	3	22.1	3	7.1	1	15

== District results ==
=== Magherafelt Town ===
1985: 2 x DUP, 1 x SDLP, 1 x UUP, 1 x Sinn Féin
1989: 2 x DUP, 1 x SDLP, 1 x UUP, 1 x Sinn Féin
1985-1989 Change: No change

Magherafelt Town - 5 seats
Party	Candidate	FPv%	Count			
Party	Candidate	FPv%	1	2	3	4
DUP	William McCrea*	34.33%	2,162			
SDLP	Patrick Kilpatrick*	20.17%	1,270			
UUP	Ernest Caldwell*	18.55%	1,168			
DUP	Paul McLean	2.38%	150	1,248.24		
Sinn Féin	John Hurl	15.93%	1,003	1,003	1,021	1,034.26
SDLP	Margaret O'Hagan	7.27%	458	459.04	648.76	713.06
Workers' Party	Marian Donnelly	1.38%	87	90.12	101.1	
Electorate: 8,585 Valid: 6,298 (73.36%) Spoilt: 123 Quota: 1,050 Turnout: 6,421 (74.79%)

=== Moyola ===
1985: 2 x DUP, 1 x Sinn Féin, 1 x UUP, 1 x SDLP
1989: 2 x UUP, 1 x Sinn Féin, 1 x DUP, 1 x SDLP
1985-1989 Change: UUP gain from DUP

Moyola - 5 seats
Party	Candidate	FPv%	Count					
Party	Candidate	FPv%	1	2	3	4	5	6
UUP	John Junkin*	19.03%	1,109					
SDLP	Henry McErlean*	15.05%	877	940	940.48	1,290.48		
Sinn Féin	Pauline Davey-Kennedy	15.98%	931	950	950	976		
UUP	Norman Montgomery	10.49%	611	620	708.32	709.68	716.68	725.68
DUP	Thomas Catherwood*	11.91%	694	696	714	715	718	724
DUP	Thomas Milligan*	9.59%	559	562	586.24	587.24	588.24	588.24
Sinn Féin	Margaret McKenna	8.22%	479	495	495	510	573	
SDLP	Francis Madden	6.30%	367	425	425.48			
Workers' Party	Hugh Scullion	3.43%	200					
Electorate: 7,941 Valid: 5,827 (73.38%) Spoilt: 182 Quota: 972 Turnout: 6,009 (75.67%)

=== Sperrin ===
1985: 2 x SDLP, 2 x Sinn Féin, 1 x UUP
1989: 2 x SDLP, 1 x Sinn Féin, 1 x UUP, 1 x Independent Nationalist
1985-1989 Change: SDLP gain from Sinn Féin, Independent Nationalist leaves SDLP

Sperrin - 5 seats
Party	Candidate	FPv%	Count				
Party	Candidate	FPv%	1	2	3	4	5
UUP	Robert Montgomery	14.43%	842	846	847	1,429	
Ind. Nationalist	Mary McSorley*	11.84%	691	753	796	821	997
SDLP	Patrick Sweeney*	10.52%	614	680	952	957	986
Sinn Féin	Bernard O'Hagan	13.73%	801	819	869	869	869
SDLP	Ghislaine O'Keeney	11.55%	674	689	857	858	862
Sinn Féin	Patrick Groogan	12.87%	751	794	803	804	805
DUP	John Linton	10.83%	632	635	635		
SDLP	Francis McKendry	9.08%	530	575			
Workers' Party	Francis Donnelly	5.14%	300				
Electorate: 7,827 Valid: 5,835 (74.55%) Spoilt: 134 Quota: 973 Turnout: 5,969 (76.26%)
