= Magherafelt Area C =

District electoral areas in Magherafelt, Northern Ireland

Magherafelt Area C was one of the three district electoral areas in Magherafelt, Northern Ireland which existed from 1973 to 1985. The district elected five members to Magherafelt District Council, and formed part of the Mid Ulster constituencies for the Northern Ireland Assembly and UK Parliament.

It was created for the 1973 local elections, and contained the wards of Ballymaguigan, Castledawson, Lecumpher, Town Parks East and Town Parks West. It was abolished for the 1985 local elections and replaced by the Magherafelt Town DEA.

== Councillors ==
Election	Councillor (Party)	Councillor (Party)	Councillor (Party)	Councillor (Party)	Councillor (Party)
1981	William McCrea (DUP)/ (United Loyalist)	George Miller (DUP)	William Lees (UUP)	Roddy Gribben (SDLP)	Bernard Murphy (Independent Republican)
1977	William McCrea (DUP)/ (United Loyalist)	George Miller (DUP)	Thomas Bradley (UUP)	Michael O'Neill (SDLP)	William Conaghan (SDLP)
1973	William McCrea (DUP)/ (United Loyalist)	William Galway (UUP)	Thomas Bradley (UUP)	Michael O'Neill (SDLP)	Aidan Larkin (SDLP)

== 1981 Election ==
1977: 2 x DUP, 2 x SDLP, 1 x UUP

1981: 2 x DUP, 1 x SDLP, 1 x UUP, 1 x Independent Republican

1977-1981 Change: Independent Republican gain from SDLP

Magherafelt Area C - 5 seats
Party	Candidate	FPv%	Count									
Party	Candidate	FPv%	1	2	3	4	5	6	7	8	9	10
DUP	William McCrea*	33.51%	2,248									
Ind. Republican	Bernard Murphy	18.01%	1,208									
DUP	George Miller*	4.22%	283	1,181								
UUP	William Lees	5.16%	346	412	427.58	427.58	432.8	494.45	720.81	720.85	1,186.35	
SDLP	Roddy Gribben	9.51%	638	638	638	679.52	683.6	705	706	976.76	977.54	978.04
SDLP	William Conaghan*	10.38%	696	697	697.11	707.83	710.79	793.65	798.15	937.43	950.6	952.6
UUUP	Ernest Caldwell	4.61%	309	403	429.49	429.57	444.72	482.52	600.66	602.66		
SDLP	Michael O'Neill*	5.93%	398	399	399.07	419.07	420.43	430.83	430.83			
UUP	James Artt	3.82%	256	298	312.98	312.98	325.68	373.01				
Alliance	Wilfred Brennan	4.29%	288	301.5	302.61	303.73	306.59					
Independent	John Gregg	0.57%	38	44	46.41	52.17						
Electorate: 7,951 Valid: 6,708 (84.37%) Spoilt: 147 Quota: 1,119 Turnout: 6,855 (86.22%)

== 1977 Election ==
1973: 2 x SDLP, 2 x UUP, 1 x United Loyalist

1977: 2 x SDLP, 2 x DUP, 1 x UUP

1973-1977 Change: DUP gain from UUP, United Loyalist joins DUP

Magherafelt Area C - 5 seats
Party	Candidate	FPv%	Count							
Party	Candidate	FPv%	1	2	3	4	5	6	7	8
DUP	William McCrea*	24.73%	1,322							
SDLP	Michael O'Neill*	14.65%	783	783	791	791	793	1,012		
SDLP	William Conaghan	15.23%	814	814.32	819.32	820.32	820.32	920.32		
DUP	George Miller	6.70%	358	665.2	665.54	682.84	772.04	772.04	772.04	980.04
UUP	Thomas Bradley*	10.23%	547	575.8	578.8	657.12	686.88	686.88	689.88	839.36
Alliance	Wilfred Brennan	8.75%	468	474.08	519.4	551.4	555.04	570.04	670.04	697.88
UUUP	Robert Ditty	4.86%	260	294.88	294.88	333.84	434.92	435.92	435.92	
SDLP	Joseph Walls	6.58%	352	352	358	358	362			
UUUP	Ruby Speer	3.50%	187	227.96	227.96	234.28				
Unionist Party NI	William Galway*	3.39%	181	182.92	182.92					
Alliance	George Logue	1.38%	74	74.64						
Electorate: 7,307 Valid: 5,346 (73.16%) Spoilt: 272 Quota: 892 Turnout: 5,618 (76.89%)

== 1973 Election ==
1973: 2 x SDLP, 2 x UUP, 1 x United Loyalist

Magherafelt Area C - 5 seats
Party	Candidate	FPv%	Count											
Party	Candidate	FPv%	1	2	3	4	5	6	7	8	9	10	11	12
United Loyalist	William McCrea	28.39%	1,639											
SDLP	Aidan Larkin	17.18%	992											
SDLP	Michael O'Neill	6.53%	377	377	387.88	395.06	402.12	410.34	422.54	423.54	654.06	654.06	789.64	1,018.64
UUP	Thomas Bradley	6.57%	379	431.89	431.89	431.89	431.89	436.71	436.71	541.42	541.42	716.18	824.88	827.92
UUP	William Galway	7.64%	441	466.83	466.87	466.87	467.87	467.87	467.87	502.25	504.27	663.96	772.78	774.84
United Loyalist	James Palmer	1.91%	110	633.98	633.98	633.98	634.98	635.98	636.98	674.46	674.46	700.66	716.96	717.98
Republican Clubs	M. Devlin	4.59%	265	265	265.84	278.92	310.94	317.02	427.14	427.14	508.66	509.66	527.37	
Alliance	W. G. Wade	5.21%	301	305.92	306.62	308.64	317.07	433.41	437.41	444.41	464.73	499.96		
UUP	R. A. Brown	6.15%	355	380.83	380.83	380.83	380.83	382.83	382.83	401.52	401.52			
SDLP	H. P. Walls	5.30%	306	306	311.14	316.14	346.32	350.52	384.8	384.8				
UUP	William Lees	2.98%	172	207.67	207.67	207.67	207.67	208.67	208.67					
Republican Clubs	M. McKenna	2.20%	127	127	127.4	136.58	168.6	170.64						
Alliance	L. Luparia	2.37%	137	137.82	138.74	140.8	147.82							
Republican Clubs	Michael O'Neill	1.66%	96	96.41	96.67	132.75								
Republican Clubs	William Mulholland	1.32%	76	76	76.6									
Electorate: 7,314 Valid: 5,773 (78.93%) Spoilt: 87 Quota: 963 Turnout: 5,860 (80.12%)
