= 1981 Magherafelt District Council election =

Local govt election in Northern Ireland

← 1977	20 May 1981	1985 →

All 15 seats to Magherafelt District Council 8 seats needed for a majority
	First party	Second party	Third party
Party	SDLP	DUP	UUP
Seats won	5	4	2
Seat change	0	▲1	▼2
	Fourth party	Fifth party	Sixth party
Party	Ind. Republican	Irish Independence	UUUP
Seats won	2	1	1
Seat change	▲2	▲1	0
	Seventh party	Eighth party
Party	Republican Clubs	Ind. Nationalist
Seats won	0	0
Seat change	▼1	▼1

Elections to Magherafelt District Council were held on 20 May 1981 on the same day as the other Northern Irish local government elections. The election used three district electoral areas to elect a total of 15 councillors.

== Election results ==
Magherafelt District Council Election Result 1981
Party	Seats	Gains	Losses	Net gain/loss	Seats %	Votes %	Votes	+/−
SDLP	5	1	1	0	33.3	25.6	4,825	▼9.5
DUP	4	1	0	▲1	26.7	24.0	4,534	▲5.3
Ind. Republican	2	2	0	▲2	13.3	14.8	2,858	▲14.8
UUP	2	0	2	▼2	13.3	9.9	1,861	▼10.2
Irish Independence	1	1	0	▲1	6.7	10.4	1,961	New
UUUP	1	0	0	0	6.7	7.3	1,379	▲1.0
Alliance	0	0	0	0	0.0	2.5	466	▼2.2
Ind. Unionist	0	0	0	0	0.0	1.9	359	▲1.9
Ind. Nationalist	0	0	1	▼1	0.0	1.6	300	▼2.8
Republican Clubs	0	0	0	0	0.0	1.5	288	▼7.0
Independent	0	0	0	0	0.0	0.2	38	▲0.2

Note: "Votes" are the first preference votes.

== Districts summary ==
Results of the Magherafelt District Council election, 1981 by district
Ward	%	Cllrs	%	Cllrs	%	Cllrs	%	Cllrs	%	Cllrs	%	Cllrs	Total Cllrs
Ward	SDLP		DUP		UUP		IIP		UUUP		Others		Total Cllrs
Area A	39.1	3	13.0	1	9.0	0	0.0	0	0.0	0	38.9	1	5
Area B	10.4	1	20.3	1	11.9	1	33.8	1	18.4	1	5.2	0	5
Area C	25.8	1	37.7	2	9.0	1	0.0	0	4.6	0	22.9	1	5
Total	25.6	5	24.0	4	9.9	2	10.4	1	7.3	1	22.8	2	15

== Districts results ==
=== Area A ===
1977: 2 x SDLP, 2 x UUP, 1 x Republican Clubs
1981: 3 x SDLP, 1 x DUP, 1 x Independent Republican
1977-1981 Change: SDLP, DUP and Independent Republican gain from UUP (two seats) and Republican Clubs

Magherafelt Area A - 5 seats
Party	Candidate	FPv%	Count						
Party	Candidate	FPv%	1	2	3	4	5	6	7
Ind. Republican	Noel McCusker	25.13%	1,597						
SDLP	Mary McSorley	14.48%	920	993.08	1,032.4	1,032.4	1,247.4		
SDLP	Patrick Sweeney*	11.10%	705	960.24	976.64	984.64	1,012.12	1,090.92	
DUP	John Linton	12.95%	823	823.36	824.36	981.72	987.44	987.44	995.44
SDLP	Francis McKendry	7.22%	459	520.56	528.8	529.8	683.84	781.17	967.17
UUP	John Henning*	8.95%	569	569.36	573.36	759.36	760.36	760.36	773.36
Republican Clubs	Francis Donnelly*	5.18%	329	390.56	545.24	548.24	566.56	577.68	
SDLP	Patrick McBride	6.34%	403	417.76	436.52	436.52			
Ind. Unionist	Francis Thompson*	5.65%	359	359.56	361.36				
Republican Clubs	Geraldine Crilly	2.16%	137	166.88					
Ind. Republican	Peter Merron	0.83%	53	87.2					
Electorate: 7,247 Valid: 6,354 (87.68%) Spoilt: 129 Quota: 1,060 Turnout: 6,483 (89.46%)

=== Area B ===
1977: 1 x SDLP, 1 x UUP, 1 x DUP, 1 x UUUP, 1 x Independent Nationalist
1981: 1 x SDLP, 1 x UUP, 1 x DUP, 1 x UUUP, 1 x IIP
1977-1981 Change: IIP gain from Independent Nationalist

Magherafelt Area B - 5 seats
Party	Candidate	FPv%	Count					
Party	Candidate	FPv%	1	2	3	4	5	6
Irish Independence	Oliver Hughes	33.77%	1,961					
UUUP	Robert Overend*	18.43%	1,070					
SDLP	Henry McErlean	4.89%	284	679.66	679.66	1,075.39		
DUP	Thomas Milligan	11.50%	668	668.55	705.49	705.58	1,146.58	
UUP	John Junkin	11.88%	690	695.99	736.79	736.79	818.03	991.87
Ind. Nationalist	Vincent O'Neill*	5.17%	300	712.02	712.49	797.72	797.81	800.99
DUP	Alexander Montgomery	8.82%	512	513.1	534.72	534.72		
SDLP	Francis Madden	5.55%	322	498.58	498.86			
Electorate: 6,702 Valid: 5,807 (86.65%) Spoilt: 178 Quota: 968 Turnout: 5,985 (89.30%)

=== Area C ===
1977: 2 x DUP, 2 x SDLP, 1 x UUP
1981: 2 x DUP, 1 x SDLP, 1 x UUP, 1 x Independent Republican
1977-1981 Change: Independent Republican gain from SDLP

Magherafelt Area C - 5 seats
Party	Candidate	FPv%	Count									
Party	Candidate	FPv%	1	2	3	4	5	6	7	8	9	10
DUP	William McCrea*	33.51%	2,248									
Ind. Republican	Bernard Murphy	18.01%	1,208									
DUP	George Miller*	4.22%	283	1,181								
UUP	William Lees	5.16%	346	412	427.58	427.58	432.8	494.45	720.81	720.85	1,186.35	
SDLP	Roddy Gribben	9.51%	638	638	638	679.52	683.6	705	706	976.76	977.54	978.04
SDLP	William Conaghan*	10.38%	696	697	697.11	707.83	710.79	793.65	798.15	937.43	950.6	952.6
UUUP	Ernest Caldwell	4.61%	309	403	429.49	429.57	444.72	482.52	600.66	602.66		
SDLP	Michael O'Neill*	5.93%	398	399	399.07	419.07	420.43	430.83	430.83			
UUP	James Artt	3.82%	256	298	312.98	312.98	325.68	373.01				
Alliance	Wilfred Brennan	4.29%	288	301.5	302.61	303.73	306.59					
Independent	John Gregg	0.57%	38	44	46.41	52.17						
Electorate: 7,951 Valid: 6,708 (84.37%) Spoilt: 147 Quota: 1,119 Turnout: 6,855 (86.22%)
