= Magherafelt Area B =

District electoral areas in Magherafelt, Northern Ireland

Magherafelt Area B was one of the three district electoral areas in Magherafelt, Northern Ireland which existed from 1973 to 1985. The district elected five members to Magherafelt District Council, and formed part of the Mid Ulster constituencies for the Northern Ireland Assembly and UK Parliament.

It was created for the 1973 local elections, and contained the wards of Bellaghy, Gulladuff, Knockloughrim, Upperlands and Valley. It was abolished for the 1985 local elections and replaced by the Moyola DEA.

== Councillors ==
Election	Councillor (Party)	Councillor (Party)	Councillor (Party)	Councillor (Party)	Councillor (Party)
1981	Robert Overend (UUUP)	Thomas Milligan (DUP)	John Junkin (UUP)	Henry McErlean (SDLP)	Oliver Hughes (IIP)
1977	Robert Overend (UUUP)	Matthew Hyndman (DUP)	Thomas Kelso (UUP)	Patrick Scullion (SDLP)	Vincent O'Neill (Independent Nationalist)
1973	Ian Davidson (Vanguard)	David Porte (UUP)	Thomas Kelso (UUP)	Patrick Scullion (SDLP)	Vincent O'Neill (Independent Nationalist)

== 1981 Election ==
1977: 1 x SDLP, 1 x UUP, 1 x DUP, 1 x UUUP, 1 x Independent Nationalist

1981: 1 x SDLP, 1 x UUP, 1 x DUP, 1 x UUUP, 1 x IIP

1977-1981 Change: IIP gain from Independent Nationalist

Magherafelt Area B - 5 seats
Party	Candidate	FPv%	Count					
Party	Candidate	FPv%	1	2	3	4	5	6
Irish Independence	Oliver Hughes	33.77%	1,961					
UUUP	Robert Overend*	18.43%	1,070					
SDLP	Henry McErlean	4.89%	284	679.66	679.66	1,075.39		
DUP	Thomas Milligan	11.50%	668	668.55	705.49	705.58	1,146.58	
UUP	John Junkin	11.88%	690	695.99	736.79	736.79	818.03	991.87
Ind. Nationalist	Vincent O'Neill*	5.17%	300	712.02	712.49	797.72	797.81	800.99
DUP	Alexander Montgomery	8.82%	512	513.1	534.72	534.72		
SDLP	Francis Madden	5.55%	322	498.58	498.86			
Electorate: 6,702 Valid: 5,807 (86.65%) Spoilt: 178 Quota: 968 Turnout: 5,985 (89.30%)

== 1977 Election ==
1973: 2 x UUP, 1 x SDLP, 1 x Vanguard, 1 x Independent Nationalist
1977: 1 x UUP, 1 x SDLP, 1 x DUP, 1 x UUUP, 1 x Independent Nationalist
1973-1977 Change: DUP and UUUP gain from UUP and Vanguard

Magherafelt Area B - 5 seats
Party	Candidate	FPv%	Count											
Party	Candidate	FPv%	1	2	3	4	5	6	7	8	9	10	11	12
DUP	Matthew Hyndman	14.81%	768	809	812	812	812	960						
Ind. Nationalist	Vincent O'Neill*	13.21%	685	685	698	712	753	753	753	912				
UUP	Thomas Kelso*	11.27%	584	647	667	667	667	713	726	727	986			
UUUP	Robert Overend	10.13%	525	545	597	597	597	686	760.75	761.75	914.75			
SDLP	Patrick Scullion*	9.82%	509	509	530	568	602	602	602	651	654	658	661	685.96
SDLP	John Madden	7.29%	378	379	388	405	566	566	566	626	630	637	639	660.32
UUP	Robert Shiels	7.35%	381	393	414	414	414	451	456.85	461.85				
Republican Clubs	Murty Dorrity	5.42%	281	283	289	397	402	402	402					
UUP	David Porte*	5.90%	306	321	326	328	328							
SDLP	Frank McWilliams	4.38%	227	227	234	243								
Republican Clubs	Michael Scullion	3.67%	190	190	198									
Alliance	Thomas Smyth	3.57%	185	190										
Vanguard	Ian Davidson*	3.18%	165											
Electorate: 6,757 Valid: 5,184 (76.72%) Spoilt: 192 Quota: 865 Turnout: 5,376 (79.56%)

== 1973 Election ==
1973: 2 x UUP, 1 x SDLP, 1 x Vanguard, 1 x Independent Nationalist

Magherafelt Area B - 5 seats
Party	Candidate	FPv%	Count					
Party	Candidate	FPv%	1	2	3	4	5	6
UUP	Thomas Kelso	20.79%	1,172					
Vanguard	Ian Davidson	19.21%	1,083					
Ind. Nationalist	Vincent O'Neill	15.75%	888	888	888.52	949.52		
UUP	David Porte	8.35%	471	562.77	615.94	615.94	657.79	1,051.79
SDLP	Patrick Scullion	13.07%	737	737.19	737.56	760.58	813.58	816.57
SDLP	John Madden	10.89%	614	614	614.13	626.13	655.32	662.07
UUP	T. J. Johnston	6.78%	382	506.07	583.55	583.55	638.93	
Alliance	John Stewart	3.37%	190	194.56	197.03	197.03		
Unity	Harry McCoy	1.79%	101	101.19	101.32			
Electorate: 6,838 Valid: 5,638 (82.45%) Spoilt: 57 Quota: 940 Turnout: 5,695 (83.28%)
