= 1997 Magherafelt District Council election =

Local govt election in Northern Ireland

← 1993	21 May 1997	2001 →

All 16 seats to Magherafelt District Council 9 seats needed for a majority
	First party	Second party	Third party
Party	Sinn Féin	SDLP	UUP
Seats won	5	5	3
Seat change	▲1	0	0
	Fourth party
Party	DUP
Seats won	3
Seat change	▼1
- Results by district electoral area, shaded by First Preference Votes.

Elections to Magherafelt District Council were held on 21 May 1997 on the same day as the other Northern Irish local government elections. The election used three district electoral areas to elect a total of 16 councillors.

== Election results ==
Magherafelt District Council Election Result 1997
Party	Seats	Gains	Losses	Net gain/loss	Seats %	Votes %	Votes	+/−
Sinn Féin	5	1	0	▲1	31.3	36.5	7,309	▲13.0
SDLP	5	0	0	0	31.3	22.6	4,528	▼10.3
DUP	3	0	1	▼1	18.8	20.6	4,628	▲2.6
UUP	3	0	0	0	18.8	14.3	2,870	▼6.0
Ind. Unionist	0	0	0	0	0.0	1.2	250	▲1.2
Workers' Party	0	0	0	0	0.0	1.0	193	▼0.9
Independent Labour	0	0	0	0	0.0	0.4	73	▲0.4
Green (NI)	0	0	0	0	0.0	0.1	12	▲0.1

Note: "Votes" are the first preference votes.

== Districts summary ==
Results of the Magherafelt District Council election, 1997 by district
Ward	%	Cllrs	%	Cllrs	%	Cllrs	%	Cllrs	%	Cllrs	Total Cllrs
Ward	Sinn Féin		SDLP		DUP		UUP		Others		Total Cllrs
Magherafelt Town	24.9	1	23.2	2	39.0	2	11.4	1	1.5	0	6
Moyola	34.1	2	19.2	1	22.0	1	19.9	1	4.8	0	5
Sperrin	51.0	2	25.3	2	9.9	0	12.1	1	1.7	0	5
Total	36.5	5	22.6	5	20.6	3	14.3	3	6.0	0	16

== District results ==
=== Magherafelt Town ===
1993: 2 x DUP, 2 x SDLP, 1 x Sinn Féin, 1 x UUP
1997: 2 x DUP, 2 x SDLP, 1 x Sinn Féin, 1 x UUP
1993-1997 Change: No change

Magherafelt Town - 6 seats
Party	Candidate	FPv%	Count			
Party	Candidate	FPv%	1	2	3	4
DUP	William McCrea*	37.50%	2,675			
Sinn Féin	Seamus O'Brien	24.91%	1,777			
SDLP	Patrick Kilpatrick*	16.11%	1,149			
DUP	Paul McLean*	1.50%	107	1,551.6		
SDLP	Joseph McBride*	7.00%	499	499.62	1,184.76	
UUP	George Shiels	11.44%	816	1,007.58	1,008.15	1,514.25
Independent Labour	Harry Hutchinson	1.02%	73	78.58	101.95	114.25
Workers' Party	Marian Donnelly	0.52%	37	38.24	80.42	81.92
Electorate: 10,104 Valid: 7,133 (70.60%) Spoilt: 89 Quota: 1,019 Turnout: 7,222 (71.48%)

=== Moyola ===
1993: 2 x DUP, 1 x Sinn Féin, 1 x UUP, 1 x SDLP
1997: 2 x Sinn Féin, 1 x DUP, 1 x UUP, 1 x SDLP
1993-1997 Change: Sinn Féin gain from DUP

Moyola - 5 seats
Party	Candidate	FPv%	Count							
Party	Candidate	FPv%	1	2	3	4	5	6	7	8
Sinn Féin	Margaret McKenna*	18.91%	1,180							
Sinn Féin	Paul Henry	15.21%	949	1,067.25						
UUP	John Junkin*	14.13%	882	882	922	922	1,231			
DUP	Thomas Catherwood*	13.28%	829	829.11	913.11	913.11	980.11	1,106.4		
SDLP	Patrick McErlean*	11.65%	727	733.49	753.49	771.73	771.73	774.65	774.65	1,218.65
DUP	Thomas Wilson*	8.67%	541	541	592	592	641	699.4	762.88	763.88
SDLP	Francis Kearney	7.50%	468	470.2	477.42	485.28	485.28	487.47	488.39	
UUP	Norman Montgomery	5.80%	362	362	431	431				
Ind. Unionist	James Mulholland	4.01%	250	250						
Workers' Party	Patrick Scullion	0.85%	53	53.66						
Electorate: 8,175 Valid: 6,241 (76.34%) Spoilt: 135 Quota: 1,041 Turnout: 6,376 (77.99%)

=== Sperrin ===
1993: 2 x Sinn Féin, 2 x SDLP, 1 x UUP
1997: 2 x Sinn Féin, 2 x SDLP, 1 x UUP
1993-1997 Change: No change

Sperrin - 5 seats
Party	Candidate	FPv%	Count				
Party	Candidate	FPv%	1	2	3	4	5
Sinn Féin	Patrick Groogan*	27.00%	1,801				
Sinn Féin	John Kelly	24.01%	1,602				
SDLP	Kathleen Lagan*	17.54%	1,170				
SDLP	Francis McKendry	7.72%	515	1,059.62	1,416.32		
UUP	Robert Montgomery*	12.14%	810	810	810	810.87	851.45
DUP	Rodney Mitchell	9.86%	658	658	658	658.87	701.41
Workers' Party	Francis Donnelly	1.54%	103	218.71	328.33	444.04	
Green (NI)	Judith Stephens	0.18%	12	34.62	53.76	72.9	
Electorate: 8,541 Valid: 6,671 (78.11%) Spoilt: 102 Quota: 1,112 Turnout: 6,773 (79.30%)
