= 2001 Magherafelt District Council election =

Local govt election in Northern Ireland

| ← 1997 | 7 June 2001 | 2005 → |

All 16 seats to Magherafelt District Council 9 seats needed for a majority
| | First party | Second party | Third party |
|---|---|---|---|
| Party | Sinn Féin | DUP | SDLP |
| Seats won | 7 | 3 | 3 |
| Seat change | ▲2 | 0 | ▼2 |
| | Fourth party | Fifth party |
| Party | UUP | Independent |
| Seats won | 2 | 1 |
| Seat change | ▼1 | ▲1 |
- Party with the most votes by district.

Elections to Magherafelt District Council were held on 7 June 2001 on the same day as the other Northern Irish local government elections. The election used three district electoral areas to elect a total of 16 councillors.

== Election results ==
Magherafelt District Council Election Result 2001
| Party | Seats | Gains | Losses | Net gain/loss | Seats % | Votes % | Votes | +/− |
|---|---|---|---|---|---|---|---|---|
| Sinn Féin | 7 | 2 | 0 | ▲2 | 43.8 | 44.2 | 9,926 | ▲7.7 |
| DUP | 3 | 0 | 0 | 0 | 18.8 | 20.6 | 4,628 | ▼3.4 |
| SDLP | 3 | 0 | 2 | ▼2 | 18.8 | 19.9 | 4,469 | ▼2.7 |
| UUP | 2 | 0 | 1 | ▼1 | 12.5 | 10.4 | 2,340 | ▼3.9 |
| Independent | 1 | 1 | 0 | ▲1 | 0.0 | 4.4 | 986 | ▲4.4 |
| Workers' Party | 0 | 0 | 0 | 0 | 0.0 | 0.5 | 104 | ▼0.5 |

Note: "Votes" are the first preference votes.

== Districts summary ==
Results of the Magherafelt District Council election, 2001 by district
| Ward | % | Cllrs | % | Cllrs | % | Cllrs | % | Cllrs | % | Cllrs | Total Cllrs |
| Ward | Sinn Féin | | DUP | | SDLP | | UUP | | Others | | Total Cllrs |
|---|---|---|---|---|---|---|---|---|---|---|---|
| Magherafelt Town | 34.7 | 2 | 30.6 | 2 | 21.0 | 1 | 13.7 | 1 | 0.0 | 0 | 6 |
| Moyola | 42.5 | 2 | 20.9 | 1 | 15.8 | 1 | 17.8 | 1 | 3.0 | 0 | 5 |
| Sperrin | 56.0 | 3 | 9.6 | 0 | 22.6 | 1 | 0.0 | 0 | 11.8 | 1 | 5 |
| Total | 44.2 | 7 | 20.6 | 3 | 19.9 | 3 | 10.4 | 2 | 4.9 | 1 | 16 |

== District results ==
=== Magherafelt Town ===
1997: 2 x Sinn Féin, 2 x DUP, 1 x SDLP, 1 x UUP
2001: 2 x Sinn Féin, 2 x DUP, 1 x SDLP, 1 x UUP
1997-2001 Change: No change

Magherafelt Town - 6 seats
| Party | Candidate | FPv% | Count | | | |
| Party | Candidate | FPv% | 1 | 2 | 3 | 4 |
|---|---|---|---|---|---|---|
| DUP | William McCrea* | 28.10% | 2,255 | | | |
| Sinn Féin | John Kelly* | 21.18% | 1,700 | | | |
| UUP | George Shiels* | 13.74% | 1,103 | 1,213.5 | | |
| DUP | Paul McLean* | 2.45% | 197 | 1,190.5 | | |
| Sinn Féin | Seamus O'Brien* | 13.52% | 1,085 | 1,085.5 | 1,538.59 | |
| SDLP | Joseph McBride* | 12.33% | 990 | 992 | 1,061.96 | 1,258.64 |
| SDLP | Frances Symington | 8.67% | 696 | 697.5 | 716.97 | 815.64 |
Electorate: 10,509 Valid: 8,026 (76.37%) Spoilt: 127 Quota: 1,147 Turnout: 8,153 (77.58%)

=== Moyola ===
1997: 2 x Sinn Féin, 1 x DUP, 1 x UUP, 1 x SDLP
2001: 2 x Sinn Féin, 1 x DUP, 1 x UUP, 1 x SDLP
1997-2001 Change: No change

Moyola - 5 seats
| Party | Candidate | FPv% | Count | | | |
| Party | Candidate | FPv% | 1 | 2 | 3 | 4 |
|---|---|---|---|---|---|---|
| Sinn Féin | Oliver Hughes | 22.71% | 1,578 | | | |
| Sinn Féin | James O'Neill | 19.79% | 1,375 | | | |
| UUP | John Junkin* | 17.80% | 1,237 | | | |
| SDLP | Patrick McErlean* | 10.26% | 713 | 1,013.84 | 1,184.65 | |
| DUP | Thomas Catherwood* | 14.72% | 1,023 | 1,023.46 | 1,023.46 | 1,159.46 |
| SDLP | Elizabeth Foster | 5.51% | 383 | 488.34 | 529.57 | 549.95 |
| DUP | Anne Forde | 6.19% | 430 | 430.46 | 430.46 | 459.46 |
| Independent | Naaman Hutchinson | 3.02% | 210 | 215.06 | 216.92 | |
Electorate: 8,583 Valid: 6,949 (80.96%) Spoilt: 155 Quota: 1,159 Turnout: 7,104 (82.77%)

=== Sperrin ===
1997: 2 x Sinn Féin, 2 x SDLP, 1 x UUP
2001: 3 x Sinn Féin, 1 x SDLP, 1 x Independent
1997-2001 Change: Sinn Féin gain from SDLP, Independent leaves UUP

Sperrin - 5 seats
| Party | Candidate | FPv% | Count | | | | |
| Party | Candidate | FPv% | 1 | 2 | 3 | 4 | 5 |
|---|---|---|---|---|---|---|---|
| Sinn Féin | Patrick Groogan* | 22.08% | 1,651 | | | | |
| Sinn Féin | Hugh Mullan | 17.80% | 1,331 | | | | |
| Sinn Féin | John Kerr | 16.13% | 1,206 | 1,554 | | | |
| SDLP | Kathleen Lagan* | 15.19% | 1,136 | 1,165 | 1,234 | 1,294.5 | |
| Independent | Robert Montgomery* | 10.38% | 776 | 776.75 | 778.75 | 783 | 900 |
| DUP | Rodney Mitchell | 9.67% | 723 | 723 | 723 | 725 | 740.25 |
| SDLP | Francis McKendry* | 7.37% | 551 | 557.5 | 577.75 | 588.25 | |
| Workers' Party | Francis Donnelly | 1.39% | 104 | 110.5 | 120 | | |
Electorate: 8,941 Valid: 7,478 (83.64%) Spoilt: 147 Quota: 1,247 Turnout: 7,625 (85.28%)
