= 2011 Magherafelt District Council election =

Local govt election in Northern Ireland

← 2005	5 May 2011	2014 →

All 16 seats to Magherafelt District Council 9 seats needed for a majority
	First party	Second party	Third party
Party	Sinn Féin	DUP	SDLP
Seats won	9	3	2
Seat change	▲1	▼1	0
	Fourth party
Party	UUP
Seats won	2
Seat change	0
- Party with the most votes by district.

Elections to Magherafelt District Council were held on 5 May 2011 on the same day as the other Northern Irish local government elections. The election used three district electoral areas to elect a total of 16 councillors.

== Election results ==
Magherafelt District Council Election Result 2011
Party	Seats	Gains	Losses	Net gain/loss	Seats %	Votes %	Votes	+/−
Sinn Féin	9	1	0	▲1	56.3	48.4	9,732	▲1.7
DUP	3	0	1	▼1	18.8	16.3	3,268	▼6.9
SDLP	2	0	0	0	12.5	15.9	3,196	▼2.6
UUP	2	0	0	0	12.5	9.8	1,972	▲3.6
TUV	0	0	0	0	0.0	5.3	1,071	New
Independent	0	0	0	0	0.0	4.2	850	▼0.7

Note: "Votes" are the first preference votes.

== Districts summary ==
Results of the Magherafelt District Council election, 2011 by district
Ward	%	Cllrs	%	Cllrs	%	Cllrs	%	Cllrs	%	Cllrs	Total Cllrs
Ward	Sinn Féin		DUP		SDLP		UUP		Others		Total Cllrs
Magherafelt Town	41.4	3	22.3	1	17.7	1	10.2	1	8.4	0	6
Moyola	48.0	3	17.1	1	8.6	0	11.2	1	15.1	0	5
Sperrin	55.6	3	9.7	1	20.6	1	8.3	0	5.8	0	5
Total	48.4	9	16.3	3	15.9	2	9.8	2	9.6	0	16

== District results ==
=== Magherafelt Town ===
2005: 2 x Sinn Féin, 2 x DUP, 1 x SDLP, 1 x UUP
2011: 3 x Sinn Féin, 1 x DUP, 1 x SDLP, 1 x UUP
2005-2011 Change: Sinn Féin gain from DUP

Magherafelt Town - 6 seats
Party	Candidate	FPv%	Count					
Party	Candidate	FPv%	1	2	3	4	5	6
Sinn Féin	Peter Bateson*	23.66%	1,616					
DUP	Paul McLean*	15.72%	1,074					
SDLP	Jim Campbell*	12.43%	849	900.6	901.32	1,191.32		
UUP	George Shiels*	10.16%	694	694	712.27	718.67	733.67	990.07
Sinn Féin	Deborah Ní Shiadhail	11.77%	804	894.4	894.4	925.8	969.8	970.8
Sinn Féin	Catherine Elattar	5.99%	409	871	871	890.8	946.8	949.8
TUV	Alan Dickson	8.45%	577	577	583.57	584.97	585.97	704.97
DUP	Wesley Brown	6.59%	450	451.2	519.24	520.42	526.42	
SDLP	Denise Johnston	5.24%	358	382.8	383.07			
Electorate: 11,154 Valid: 6,831 (61.24%) Spoilt: 137 Quota: 976 Turnout: 6,968 (62.47%)

=== Moyola ===
2005: 3 x Sinn Féin, 1 x DUP, 1 x UUP
2011: 3 x Sinn Féin, 1 x DUP, 1 x UUP
2005-2011 Change: No change

Moyola - 5 seats
Party	Candidate	FPv%	Count				
Party	Candidate	FPv%	1	2	3	4	5
Sinn Féin	Ian Milne*	24.28%	1,496				
DUP	Thomas Catherwood*	17.09%	1,053				
Sinn Féin	Sean McPeake*	15.01%	925	975.84	1,120.84		
Sinn Féin	Caoimhe Scullion	8.73%	538	908.14	1,055.14		
UUP	John Crawford*	11.17%	688	688.31	690.31	691.31	1,085.31
SDLP	Ann-Marie McErlean	8.55%	527	539.09	610.05	643.05	664.05
TUV	Alan Millar	8.02%	494	494.62	496.62	500.62	
Independent	Oliver Hughes*	7.14%	440	462.63			
Electorate: 9,281 Valid: 6,161 (66.38%) Spoilt: 107 Quota: 1,027 Turnout: 6,268 (67.54%)

=== Sperrin ===
2005: 3 x Sinn Féin, 1 x SDLP, 1 x DUP
2011: 3 x Sinn Féin, 1 x SDLP, 1 x DUP
2005-2011 Change: No change

Sperrin - 5 seats
Party	Candidate	FPv%	Count				
Party	Candidate	FPv%	1	2	3	4	5
Sinn Féin	Brian McGuigan	18.50%	1,313				
SDLP	Kathleen Lagan*	12.61%	895	944	950	1,000.1	1,434.1
DUP	Anne Forde*	9.74%	691	692	692	1,135	1,148.1
Sinn Féin	Kathleen McEldowney*	14.25%	1,011	1,076	1,092.7	1,094.7	1,141.4
Sinn Féin	John Kerr*	13.29%	943	1,031	1,042.2	1,042.2	1,084.5
Sinn Féin	Gabhán McFalone	9.54%	677	728	812.2	812.2	829.6
SDLP	Austin Kelly	7.99%	567	613	622.9	639.9	
UUP	Alistair Stewart	8.31%	590	590	590.1		
Independent	Patrick Groogan*	5.78%	410				
Electorate: 10,089 Valid: 7,097 (70.34%) Spoilt: 101 Quota: 1,183 Turnout: 7,198 (71.35%)
