= Sperrin (Magherafelt District Electoral Area) =

District electoral areas in Magherafelt, Northern Ireland

Sperrin DEA (1993–2014) within Magherafelt

Sperrin was one of the three district electoral areas in Magherafelt, Northern Ireland which existed from 1985 to 2014. The district elected five members to Magherafelt District Council, and formed part of the Mid Ulster constituencies for the Northern Ireland Assembly and UK Parliament.

It was created for the 1985 local elections, replacing Magherafelt Area A which had existed since 1973, and contained the wards of Draperstown, Lower Glenshane, Maghera, Swatragh and Tobermore. It was abolished for the 2014 local elections and largely replaced with the new Carntogher DEA with Draperstown moving to the Moyola DEA.

== Councillors ==
Election	Councillor (Party)	Councillor (Party)	Councillor (Party)	Councillor (Party)	Councillor (Party)
2011	Brian McGuigan (Sinn Féin)	John Kerr (Sinn Féin)	Kathleen McEldowney (Sinn Féin)	Kathleen Lagan (SDLP)	Anne Forde (DUP)
2005	Patrick Groogan (Sinn Féin)	John Kerr (Sinn Féin)	Kathleen McEldowney (Sinn Féin)	Kathleen Lagan (SDLP)	Anne Forde (DUP)
2001	Patrick Groogan (Sinn Féin)	John Kerr (Sinn Féin)	Hugh Mullan (Sinn Féin)	Kathleen Lagan (SDLP)	Robert Montgomery (UUP)/ (Independent)
1997	Patrick Groogan (Sinn Féin)	John Kelly (Sinn Féin)	Francis McKendry (SDLP)	Kathleen Lagan (SDLP)	Robert Montgomery (UUP)/ (Independent)
1993	Patrick Groogan (Sinn Féin)	John Walsh (Sinn Féin)	Ghislaine O'Keeney (SDLP)	Kathleen Lagan (SDLP)	Robert Montgomery (UUP)/ (Independent)
1989	Bernard O'Hagan (Sinn Féin)	Mary McSorley (Independent Nationalist)/ (SDLP)	Ghislaine O'Keeney (SDLP)	Patrick Sweeney (SDLP)	Robert Montgomery (UUP)/ (Independent)
1985	Patrick Doherty (Sinn Féin)	Mary McSorley (Independent Nationalist)/ (SDLP)	Patrick Toner (Sinn Féin)	Patrick Sweeney (SDLP)	Walter Richardson (UUP)

== 2011 Election ==
2005: 3 x Sinn Féin, 1 x SDLP, 1 x DUP

2011: 3 x Sinn Féin, 1 x SDLP, 1 x DUP

2005-2011 Change: No change

Sperrin - 5 seats
Party	Candidate	FPv%	Count				
Party	Candidate	FPv%	1	2	3	4	5
Sinn Féin	Brian McGuigan	18.50%	1,313				
SDLP	Kathleen Lagan*	12.61%	895	944	950	1,000.1	1,434.1
DUP	Anne Forde*	9.74%	691	692	692	1,135	1,148.1
Sinn Féin	Kathleen McEldowney*	14.25%	1,011	1,076	1,092.7	1,094.7	1,141.4
Sinn Féin	John Kerr*	13.29%	943	1,031	1,042.2	1,042.2	1,084.5
Sinn Féin	Gabhán McFalone	9.54%	677	728	812.2	812.2	829.6
SDLP	Austin Kelly	7.99%	567	613	622.9	639.9	
UUP	Alistair Stewart	8.31%	590	590	590.1		
Independent	Patrick Groogan*	5.78%	410				
Electorate: 10,089 Valid: 7,097 (70.34%) Spoilt: 101 Quota: 1,183 Turnout: 7,198 (71.35%)

== 2005 Election ==
2001: 3 x Sinn Féin, 1 x SDLP, 1 x Independent

2005: 3 x Sinn Féin, 1 x SDLP, 1 x DUP

2001-2005 Change: DUP gain from Independent

Sperrin - 5 seats
Party	Candidate	FPv%	Count					
Party	Candidate	FPv%	1	2	3	4	5	6
Sinn Féin	Patrick Groogan*	19.09%	1,396					
Sinn Féin	Kathleen McEldowney	15.52%	1,135	1,139	1,233.2			
Sinn Féin	John Kerr*	15.27%	1,117	1,123	1,159.48	1,607.48		
DUP	Anne Forde	10.80%	790	795	795.12	795.12	795.12	1,257.12
SDLP	Kathleen Lagan*	13.66%	999	1,036	1,043.08	1,044.88	1,136.88	1,203.88
SDLP	Hugh Kelly	9.23%	675	697	709.72	727.28	741.28	762.28
Independent	Robert Montgomery*	8.33%	609	615	616.2	618.2	623.2	
Sinn Féin	Hugh Mullan*	6.71%	491	496	509.2			
Workers' Party	Francis Donnelly	1.39%	102					
Electorate: 9,314 Valid: 7,314 (78.53%) Spoilt: 107 Quota: 1,220 Turnout: 7,421 (79.68%)

== 2001 Election ==
1997: 2 x Sinn Féin, 2 x SDLP, 1 x UUP

2001: 3 x Sinn Féin, 1 x SDLP, 1 x Independent

1997-2001 Change: Sinn Féin gain from SDLP, Independent leaves UUP

Sperrin - 5 seats
Party	Candidate	FPv%	Count				
Party	Candidate	FPv%	1	2	3	4	5
Sinn Féin	Patrick Groogan*	22.08%	1,651				
Sinn Féin	Hugh Mullan	17.80%	1,331				
Sinn Féin	John Kerr	16.13%	1,206	1,554			
SDLP	Kathleen Lagan*	15.19%	1,136	1,165	1,234	1,294.5	
Independent	Robert Montgomery*	10.38%	776	776.75	778.75	783	900
DUP	Rodney Mitchell	9.67%	723	723	723	725	740.25
SDLP	Francis McKendry*	7.37%	551	557.5	577.75	588.25	
Workers' Party	Francis Donnelly	1.39%	104	110.5	120		
Electorate: 8,941 Valid: 7,478 (83.64%) Spoilt: 147 Quota: 1,247 Turnout: 7,625 (85.28%)

== 1997 Election ==
1993: 2 x Sinn Féin, 2 x SDLP, 1 x UUP

1997: 2 x Sinn Féin, 2 x SDLP, 1 x UUP

1993-1997 Change: No change

Sperrin - 5 seats
Party	Candidate	FPv%	Count				
Party	Candidate	FPv%	1	2	3	4	5
Sinn Féin	Patrick Groogan*	27.00%	1,801				
Sinn Féin	John Kelly	24.01%	1,602				
SDLP	Kathleen Lagan*	17.54%	1,170				
SDLP	Francis McKendry	7.72%	515	1,059.62	1,416.32		
UUP	Robert Montgomery*	12.14%	810	810	810	810.87	851.45
DUP	Rodney Mitchell	9.86%	658	658	658	658.87	701.41
Workers' Party	Francis Donnelly	1.54%	103	218.71	328.33	444.04	
Green (NI)	Judith Stephens	0.18%	12	34.62	53.76	72.9	
Electorate: 8,541 Valid: 6,671 (78.11%) Spoilt: 102 Quota: 1,112 Turnout: 6,773 (79.30%)

== 1993 Election ==
1989: 2 x SDLP, 1 x Sinn Féin, 1 x UUP, 1 x Independent Nationalist
1993: 2 x SDLP, 2 x Sinn Féin, 1 x UUP
1989-1993 Change: Sinn Féin gain from Independent Nationalist

Sperrin - 5 seats
Party	Candidate	FPv%	Count		
Party	Candidate	FPv%	1	2	3
Sinn Féin	Patrick Groogan	20.18%	1,244		
UUP	Robert Montgomery*	17.26%	1,064		
SDLP	Kathleen Lagan	15.16%	935	950.3	1,090.64
Sinn Féin	John Walsh	12.94%	798	967.2	990.18
SDLP	Ghislaine O'Keeney*	14.08%	868	882.94	915.3
SDLP	Francis McKendry	10.57%	652	654.88	689.78
DUP	Wesley Brown	6.23%	384	384.18	
Workers' Party	Francis Donnelly	3.58%	221	227.84	
Electorate: 8,201 Valid: 6,166 (75.19%) Spoilt: 134 Quota: 1,028 Turnout: 6,300 (76.82%)

== 1989 Election ==
1985: 2 x SDLP, 2 x Sinn Féin, 1 x UUP

1989: 2 x SDLP, 1 x Sinn Féin, 1 x UUP, 1 x Independent Nationalist

1985-1989 Change: SDLP gain from Sinn Féin, Independent Nationalist leaves SDLP

Sperrin - 5 seats
Party	Candidate	FPv%	Count				
Party	Candidate	FPv%	1	2	3	4	5
UUP	Robert Montgomery	14.43%	842	846	847	1,429	
Ind. Nationalist	Mary McSorley*	11.84%	691	753	796	821	997
SDLP	Patrick Sweeney*	10.52%	614	680	952	957	986
Sinn Féin	Bernard O'Hagan	13.73%	801	819	869	869	869
SDLP	Ghislaine O'Keeney	11.55%	674	689	857	858	862
Sinn Féin	Patrick Groogan	12.87%	751	794	803	804	805
DUP	John Linton	10.83%	632	635	635		
SDLP	Francis McKendry	9.08%	530	575			
Workers' Party	Francis Donnelly	5.14%	300				
Electorate: 7,827 Valid: 5,835 (74.55%) Spoilt: 134 Quota: 973 Turnout: 5,969 (76.26%)

== 1985 Election ==
1985: 2 x SDLP, 2 x Sinn Féin, 1 x UUP

Sperrin - 5 seats
Party	Candidate	FPv%	Count				
Party	Candidate	FPv%	1	2	3	4	5
Sinn Féin	Patrick Doherty	16.87%	1,028				
SDLP	Patrick Sweeney*	10.59%	645	715	1,037		
SDLP	Mary McSorley*	14.20%	865	886	950	1,427	
Sinn Féin	Patrick Toner	12.64%	770	806	814	860	1,001
UUP	Walter Richardson	15.35%	935	945	946	950	959
DUP	John Linton*	10.70%	652	654	655	659	663
SDLP	John Bradley	8.32%	507	524	586		
SDLP	Francis McKendry*	7.42%	452	478			
Workers' Party	Francis Donnelly	3.92%	239				
Electorate: 7,558 Valid: 6,093 (80.62%) Spoilt: 108 Quota: 1,016 Turnout: 6,201 (82.05%)
