= Magherafelt Area A =

District electoral areas in Magherafelt, Northern Ireland

Magherafelt Area A was one of the three district electoral areas in Magherafelt, Northern Ireland which existed from 1973 to 1985. The district elected five members to Magherafelt District Council, and formed part of the Mid Ulster constituencies for the Northern Ireland Assembly and UK Parliament.

It was created for the 1973 local elections, and contained the wards of Draperstown, Lower Glenshane, Maghera, Swatragh and Tobermore. It was abolished for the 1985 local elections and replaced by the Sperrin DEA.

== Councillors ==
Election	Councillor (Party)	Councillor (Party)	Councillor (Party)	Councillor (Party)	Councillor (Party)
1981	John Linton (DUP)	Mary McSorley (SDLP)	Patrick Sweeney (SDLP)	Francis McKendry (SDLP)	Noel McCusker (Independent Republican)
1977	Francis Thompson (UUP)	John Henning (UUP)	Patrick Sweeney (SDLP)	Philip Bradley (SDLP)	Francis Donnelly (Republican Clubs)
1973	David Campbell (UUP)	P. J. Heron (SDLP)	Patrick Sweeney (SDLP)	Philip Bradley (SDLP)	Francis Donnelly (Republican Clubs)

== 1981 Election ==
1977: 2 x SDLP, 2 x UUP, 1 x Republican Clubs

1981: 3 x SDLP, 1 x DUP, 1 x Independent Republican

1977-1981 Change: SDLP, DUP and Independent Republican gain from UUP (two seats) and Republican Clubs

Magherafelt Area A - 5 seats
Party	Candidate	FPv%	Count						
Party	Candidate	FPv%	1	2	3	4	5	6	7
Ind. Republican	Noel McCusker	25.13%	1,597						
SDLP	Mary McSorley	14.48%	920	993.08	1,032.4	1,032.4	1,247.4		
SDLP	Patrick Sweeney*	11.10%	705	960.24	976.64	984.64	1,012.12	1,090.92	
DUP	John Linton	12.95%	823	823.36	824.36	981.72	987.44	987.44	995.44
SDLP	Francis McKendry	7.22%	459	520.56	528.8	529.8	683.84	781.17	967.17
UUP	John Henning*	8.95%	569	569.36	573.36	759.36	760.36	760.36	773.36
Republican Clubs	Francis Donnelly*	5.18%	329	390.56	545.24	548.24	566.56	577.68	
SDLP	Patrick McBride	6.34%	403	417.76	436.52	436.52			
Ind. Unionist	Francis Thompson*	5.65%	359	359.56	361.36				
Republican Clubs	Geraldine Crilly	2.16%	137	166.88					
Ind. Republican	Peter Merron	0.83%	53	87.2					
Electorate: 7,247 Valid: 6,354 (87.68%) Spoilt: 129 Quota: 1,060 Turnout: 6,483 (89.46%)

== 1977 Election ==
1973: 3 x SDLP, 1 x UUP, 1 x Republican Clubs

1977: 2 x SDLP, 2 x UUP, 1 x Republican Clubs

1973-1977 Change: UUP gain from SDLP

Magherafelt Area A - 5 seats
Party	Candidate	FPv%	Count					
Party	Candidate	FPv%	1	2	3	4	5	6
SDLP	Philip Bradley*	24.87%	1,243					
Republican Clubs	Francis Donnelly*	11.20%	560	619.4	682.76	844.92		
UUP	Francis Thompson	13.07%	653	653	654	654	654	927
SDLP	Patrick Sweeney*	13.81%	690	789	806.08	830.32	832.48	832.48
UUP	John Henning	13.13%	656	656.72	656.72	656.72	657.08	827.24
SDLP	Francis McKendry	9.10%	455	674.24	676.24	689.92	692.44	693.52
DUP	Phyllis Charlton	8.98%	449	455.12	455.12	455.12	455.12	
Republican Clubs	Kevin Murphy	3.86%	193	213.52	225.88			
Republican Clubs	Peter Merron	1.98%	99	100.8				
Electorate: 6,853 Valid: 4,998 (72.93%) Spoilt: 285 Quota: 834 Turnout: 5,283 (77.09%)

== 1973 Election ==
1973: 3 x SDLP, 1 x UUP, 1 x Republican Clubs

Magherafelt Area A - 5 seats
Party	Candidate	FPv%	Count									
Party	Candidate	FPv%	1	2	3	4	5	6	7	8	9	10
SDLP	P. J. Heron	20.42%	1,168									
SDLP	Patrick Sweeney	9.37%	536	550.76	565.76	581.94	619.48	633.84	874.58	928.76	????	
Republican Clubs	Francis Donnelly	5.94%	340	341.62	357.62	396.62	398.8	399.8	412.16	632.34	????	
UUP	David Campbell	14.90%	852	852.54	854.54	854.54	873.54	944.54	944.54	945.54	????	????
SDLP	Philip Bradley	9.20%	526	686.36	709.28	711.28	722	725	756.86	768.04	????	????
UUP	Esmond Thompson	13.18%	754	754	754	754	779	890	892	893	????	????
Republican Clubs	J. Convery	7.01%	401	414.5	426.5	435.5	437.68	437.68	443.76	535.12		
Republican Clubs	W. Gribben	5.63%	322	322.54	330.72	370.72	377.72	380.9	387.9			
SDLP	Bridget McKeown	4.62%	264	277.14	278.14	284.5	303.22	308.4				
Independent	R. W. Shiels	3.25%	186	186.54	190.54	190.54	221.72					
Alliance	Andrew Davidson	2.80%	160	162.52	166.52	166.52						
Republican Clubs	Peter Merron	1.87%	107	107.54	113.54							
Unity	Kevin Agnew	1.82%	104	105.26								
Electorate: 7,097 Valid: 5,720 (80.60%) Spoilt: 122 Quota: 954 Turnout: 5,842 (82.32%)

- Data missing from stages 9 and 10
