= Esmond Thompson =

Northern Irish politician (1929–2021)

Member of Magherafelt District Council
- In office 18 May 1977 – 20 May 1981
- Preceded by: David Campbell
- Succeeded by: John Linton
- Constituency: Magherafelt Area A

Member of the Northern Ireland Constitutional Convention for Mid Ulster
- In office 1975–1976

Personal details
- Born: 1929 Maghera, Northern Ireland
- Died: 16 December 2021 (aged 91–92)
- Party: Ulster Unionist Party

Francis Henry Esmond Thompson (1929 – 16 December 2021) was a Northern Irish politician with the Ulster Unionist Party (UUP).

== Background ==
Born in Maghera, Thompson served with the Royal Navy and later the Ulster Defence Regiment. He subsequently served as sub-postmaster at Maghera Post Office for 41 years, retiring in 2001.

Thompson served as a member of the UUP executive from 1971, still being in position as of 1994. He also represented the party as a member of the Northern Ireland Constitutional Convention for Mid-Ulster and as a member of Magherafelt District Council from 1977 to 1981. In November 1975, he was convicted of unlawful possession of a firearm, which he claimed he owned for his own protection. In March 1977, he was shot in the arm in what was described as an assassination attempt, although he received only minor injuries.

Thompson was known as a hard-line member of the UUP and had publicly criticised party colleague John Taylor during the life of the Constitutional Convention, feeling that Taylor was soft on proposals for power-sharing with the Social Democratic and Labour Party that had been proposed by William Craig. In later years he was associated with the anti-Good Friday Agreement wing of the party and was a strong critic of the leadership of David Trimble.

Thompson died on 16 December 2021, at the age of 92.

Northern Ireland Constitutional Convention
New convention	Member for Mid-Ulster; 1975–1976	Convention dissolved
