= 1977 Magherafelt District Council election =

Local govt election in Northern Ireland

← 1973	18 May 1977	1981 →

All 15 seats to Magherafelt District Council 8 seats needed for a majority
	First party	Second party	Third party
Party	SDLP	UUP	DUP
Seats won	5	4	3
Seat change	▼1	▼1	▲3
	Fourth party	Fifth party	Sixth party
Party	Republican Clubs	UUUP	Ind. Nationalist
Seats won	1	1	1
Seat change	0	▲1	0
	Seventh party	Eighth party
Party	Vanguard	United Loyalist
Seats won	0	0
Seat change	▼1	▼1

Elections to Magherafelt District Council were held on 18 May 1977 on the same day as the other Northern Irish local government elections. The election used three district electoral areas to elect a total of 15 councillors.

== Election results ==
Magherafelt District Council Election Result 1977
Party	Seats	Gains	Losses	Net gain/loss	Seats %	Votes %	Votes	+/−
SDLP	5	0	1	▼1	33.3	35.1	5,451	▲2.9
UUP	4	1	2	▼1	26.7	20.1	3,127	▼9.0
DUP	3	3	0	▲3	20.0	18.7	2,897	New
Republican Clubs	1	0	0	0	0.0	8.5	1,323	▼0.6
UUUP	1	1	0	▲1	6.7	6.3	972	New
Ind. Nationalist	1	0	0	0	6.7	4.4	685	▼0.8
Alliance	0	0	0	0	0.0	4.7	727	▲0.1
Unionist Party NI	0	0	0	0	0.0	1.2	181	New
Vanguard	0	0	0	0	0.0	1.1	165	▼5.2

Note: "Votes" are the first preference votes.

== Districts summary ==
Results of the Magherafelt District Council election, 1977 by district
Ward	%	Cllrs	%	Cllrs	%	Cllrs	%	Cllrs	%	Cllrs	%	Cllrs	Total Cllrs
Ward	SDLP		UUP		DUP		RC		UUUP		Others		Total Cllrs
Area A	47.8	2	26.2	2	10.0	0	17.0	1	0.0	0	0.0	0	5
Area B	21.5	1	24.5	2	14.8	1	9.1	0	10.1	1	20.0	1	5
Area C	36.5	2	10.2	1	31.4	2	0.0	0	8.4	0	13.5	0	5
Total	35.1	5	20.1	4	18.7	3	8.5	1	6.3	1	11.3	1	15

== Districts results ==
=== Area A ===
1973: 3 x SDLP, 1 x UUP, 1 x Republican Clubs
1977: 2 x SDLP, 2 x UUP, 1 x Republican Clubs
1973-1977 Change: UUP gain from SDLP

Magherafelt Area A - 5 seats
Party	Candidate	FPv%	Count					
Party	Candidate	FPv%	1	2	3	4	5	6
SDLP	Philip Bradley*	24.87%	1,243					
Republican Clubs	Francis Donnelly*	11.20%	560	619.4	682.76	844.92		
UUP	Francis Thompson	13.07%	653	653	654	654	654	927
SDLP	Patrick Sweeney*	13.81%	690	789	806.08	830.32	832.48	832.48
UUP	John Henning	13.13%	656	656.72	656.72	656.72	657.08	827.24
SDLP	Francis McKendry	9.10%	455	674.24	676.24	689.92	692.44	693.52
DUP	Phyllis Charlton	8.98%	449	455.12	455.12	455.12	455.12	
Republican Clubs	Kevin Murphy	3.86%	193	213.52	225.88			
Republican Clubs	Peter Merron	1.98%	99	100.8				
Electorate: 6,853 Valid: 4,998 (72.93%) Spoilt: 285 Quota: 834 Turnout: 5,283 (77.09%)

=== Area B ===
1973: 2 x UUP, 1 x SDLP, 1 x Vanguard, 1 x Independent Nationalist
1977: 1 x UUP, 1 x SDLP, 1 x DUP, 1 x UUUP, 1 x Independent Nationalist
1973-1977 Change: DUP and UUUP gain from UUP and Vanguard

Magherafelt Area B - 5 seats
Party	Candidate	FPv%	Count											
Party	Candidate	FPv%	1	2	3	4	5	6	7	8	9	10	11	12
DUP	Matthew Hyndman	14.81%	768	809	812	812	812	960						
Ind. Nationalist	Vincent O'Neill*	13.21%	685	685	698	712	753	753	753	912				
UUP	Thomas Kelso*	11.27%	584	647	667	667	667	713	726	727	986			
UUUP	Robert Overend	10.13%	525	545	597	597	597	686	760.75	761.75	914.75			
SDLP	Patrick Scullion*	9.82%	509	509	530	568	602	602	602	651	654	658	661	685.96
SDLP	John Madden	7.29%	378	379	388	405	566	566	566	626	630	637	639	660.32
UUP	Robert Shiels	7.35%	381	393	414	414	414	451	456.85	461.85				
Republican Clubs	Murty Dorrity	5.42%	281	283	289	397	402	402	402					
UUP	David Porte	5.90%	306	321	326	328	328							
SDLP	Frank McWilliams	4.38%	227	227	234	243								
Republican Clubs	Michael Scullion	3.67%	190	190	198									
Alliance	Thomas Smyth	3.57%	185	190										
Vanguard	Ian Davidson*	3.18%	165											
Electorate: 6,757 Valid: 5,184 (76.72%) Spoilt: 192 Quota: 865 Turnout: 5,376 (79.56%)

=== Area C ===
1973: 2 x SDLP, 2 x UUP, 1 x United Loyalist
1977: 2 x SDLP, 2 x DUP, 1 x UUP
1973-1977 Change: DUP gain from UUP, United Loyalist joins DUP

Magherafelt Area C - 5 seats
Party	Candidate	FPv%	Count							
Party	Candidate	FPv%	1	2	3	4	5	6	7	8
DUP	William McCrea*	24.73%	1,322							
SDLP	Michael O'Neill*	14.65%	783	783	791	791	793	1,012		
SDLP	William Conaghan	15.23%	814	814.32	819.32	820.32	820.32	920.32		
DUP	George Miller	6.70%	358	665.2	665.54	682.84	772.04	772.04	772.04	980.04
UUP	Thomas Bradley*	10.23%	547	575.8	578.8	657.12	686.88	686.88	689.88	839.36
Alliance	Wilfred Brennan	8.75%	468	474.08	519.4	551.4	555.04	570.04	670.04	697.88
UUUP	Robert Ditty	4.86%	260	294.88	294.88	333.84	434.92	435.92	435.92	
SDLP	Joseph Walls	6.58%	352	352	358	358	362			
UUUP	Ruby Speer	3.50%	187	227.96	227.96	234.28				
Unionist Party NI	William Galway*	3.39%	181	182.92	182.92					
Alliance	George Logue	1.38%	74	74.64						
Electorate: 7,307 Valid: 5,346 (73.16%) Spoilt: 272 Quota: 892 Turnout: 5,618 (76.89%)
