= 1973 Magherafelt District Council election =

Local govt election in Northern Ireland

30 May 1973	1977 →

All 15 seats to Magherafelt District Council 8 seats needed for a majority
	First party	Second party	Third party
Party	SDLP	UUP	Republican Clubs
Seats won	6	5	1
	Fourth party	Fifth party	Sixth party
Party	Vanguard	United Loyalist	Ind. Nationalist
Seats won	1	1	1

Elections to Magherafelt District Council were held on 30 May 1973 on the same day as the other Northern Irish local government elections. The election used three district electoral areas to elect a total of 15 councillors.

== Election results ==
Party	Seats	±	First Pref. votes	FPv%	±%
SDLP	6		5,520	32.2	
UUP	5		4,978	29.1	
United Loyalist	1		1,749	10.2	
Republican Clubs	1		1,562	9.1	
Vanguard	1		1,083	6.3	
Ind. Nationalist	1		888	5.2	
Alliance	0		788	4.6	
Unity	0		377	2.2	
Independent	0		186	1.1	
Totals	15		17,131	100.0	—

== Districts summary ==
Results of the Magherafelt District Council election, 1973 by district
Ward	%	Cllrs	%	Cllrs	%	Cllrs	%	Cllrs	%	Cllrs	Total Cllrs
Ward	SDLP		UUP		RC		Vanguard		Others		Total Cllrs
Area A	43.6	3	28.1	1	20.5	1	0.0	0	7.8	1	5
Area B	24.0	1	35.9	2	0.0	0	19.2	1	20.9	1	5
Area C	29.0	2	23.3	2	6.8	0	0.0	0	40.9	1	5
Total	32.2	6	29.1	5	9.1	1	6.3	1	23.3	2	15

== Districts results ==
=== Area A ===
1973: 3 x SDLP, 1 x UUP, 1 x Republican Clubs

Magherafelt Area A - 5 seats
Party	Candidate	FPv%	Count									
Party	Candidate	FPv%	1	2	3	4	5	6	7	8	9	10
SDLP	P. J. Heron	20.42%	1,168									
SDLP	Patrick Sweeney	9.37%	536	550.76	565.76	581.94	619.48	633.84	874.58	928.76	????	
Republican Clubs	Francis Donnelly	5.94%	340	341.62	357.62	396.62	398.8	399.8	412.16	632.34	????	
UUP	David Campbell	14.90%	852	852.54	854.54	854.54	873.54	944.54	944.54	945.54	????	????
SDLP	Philip Bradley	9.20%	526	686.36	709.28	711.28	722	725	756.86	768.04	????	????
UUP	Esmond Thompson	13.18%	754	754	754	754	779	890	892	893	????	????
Republican Clubs	J. Convery	7.01%	401	414.5	426.5	435.5	437.68	437.68	443.76	535.12		
Republican Clubs	W. Gribben	5.63%	322	322.54	330.72	370.72	377.72	380.9	387.9			
SDLP	Bridget McKeown	4.62%	264	277.14	278.14	284.5	303.22	308.4				
Independent	R. W. Shiels	3.25%	186	186.54	190.54	190.54	221.72					
Alliance	Andrew Davidson	2.80%	160	162.52	166.52	166.52						
Republican Clubs	Peter Merron	1.87%	107	107.54	113.54							
Unity	Kevin Agnew	1.82%	104	105.26								
Electorate: 7,097 Valid: 5,720 (80.60%) Spoilt: 122 Quota: 954 Turnout: 5,842 (82.32%)

- Data missing from stages 9 and 10

=== Area B ===
1973: 2 x UUP, 1 x SDLP, 1 x Vanguard, 1 x Independent Nationalist

Magherafelt Area B - 5 seats
Party	Candidate	FPv%	Count					
Party	Candidate	FPv%	1	2	3	4	5	6
UUP	Thomas Kelso	20.79%	1,172					
Vanguard	Ian Davidson	19.21%	1,083					
Ind. Nationalist	Vincent O'Neill	15.75%	888	888	888.52	949.52		
UUP	David Porte	8.35%	471	562.77	615.94	615.94	657.79	1,051.79
SDLP	Patrick Scullion	13.07%	737	737.19	737.56	760.58	813.58	816.57
SDLP	John Madden	10.89%	614	614	614.13	626.13	655.32	662.07
UUP	T. J. Johnston	6.78%	382	506.07	583.55	583.55	638.93	
Alliance	John Stewart	3.37%	190	194.56	197.03	197.03		
Unity	Harry McCoy	1.79%	101	101.19	101.32			
Electorate: 6,838 Valid: 5,638 (82.45%) Spoilt: 57 Quota: 940 Turnout: 5,695 (83.28%)

=== Area C ===
1973: 2 x SDLP, 2 x UUP, 1 x United Loyalist

Magherafelt Area C - 5 seats
Party	Candidate	FPv%	Count											
Party	Candidate	FPv%	1	2	3	4	5	6	7	8	9	10	11	12
United Loyalist	William McCrea	28.39%	1,639											
SDLP	Aidan Larkin	17.18%	992											
SDLP	Michael O'Neill	6.53%	377	377	387.88	395.06	402.12	410.34	422.54	423.54	654.06	654.06	789.64	1,018.64
UUP	Thomas Bradley	6.57%	379	431.89	431.89	431.89	431.89	436.71	436.71	541.42	541.42	716.18	824.88	827.92
UUP	William Galway	7.64%	441	466.83	466.87	466.87	467.87	467.87	467.87	502.25	504.27	663.96	772.78	774.84
United Loyalist	James Palmer	1.91%	110	633.98	633.98	633.98	634.98	635.98	636.98	674.46	674.46	700.66	716.96	717.98
Republican Clubs	M. Devlin	4.59%	265	265	265.84	278.92	310.94	317.02	427.14	427.14	508.66	509.66	527.37	
Alliance	W. G. Wade	5.21%	301	305.92	306.62	308.64	317.07	433.41	437.41	444.41	464.73	499.96		
UUP	R. A. Brown	6.15%	355	380.83	380.83	380.83	380.83	382.83	382.83	401.52	401.52			
SDLP	H. P. Walls	5.30%	306	306	311.14	316.14	346.32	350.52	384.8	384.8				
UUP	William Lees	2.98%	172	207.67	207.67	207.67	207.67	208.67	208.67					
Republican Clubs	M. McKenna	2.20%	127	127	127.4	136.58	168.6	170.64						
Alliance	L. Luparia	2.37%	137	137.82	138.74	140.8	147.82							
Republican Clubs	Michael O'Neill	1.66%	96	96.41	96.67	132.75								
Republican Clubs	William Mulholland	1.32%	76	76	76.6									
Electorate: 7,314 Valid: 5,773 (78.93%) Spoilt: 87 Quota: 963 Turnout: 5,860 (80.12%)
