= Moyola (District Electoral Area) =

District electoral area in Northern Ireland

- Mid Ulster District Council DEA constituency

Current constituency
- Created: 1985
- Seats: 5 (1985-)
- Councillors: Anne Forde (DUP); Jolene Groogan (SF); Denise Johnston (SDLP); Donal McPeake (SF); Ian Milne (SF)

Moyola DEA within Mid Ulster

Moyola DEA (1993–2014) within Magherafelt

Moyola is one of the seven district electoral areas (DEA) in Mid Ulster, Northern Ireland. The district elects five members to Mid Ulster District Council and contains the wards of Ballymaguigan, Bellaghy, Castledawson, Draperstown and Tobermore. Moyola forms part of the Mid Ulster constituencies for the Northern Ireland Assembly and UK Parliament.

It was created for the 1985 local elections, where it contained five wards (Bellaghy, Castledawson, Gulladuff, Upperlands and Valley). For the 2014 local elections it gained Ballymaguigan from the Magherafelt Town DEA and Draperstown from the abolished Sperrin DEA.

== Councillors ==
| Election | Councillor (Party) | Councillor (Party) | Councillor (Party) | Councillor (Party) | Councillor (Party) |
|---|---|---|---|---|---|
| 2023 | Ian Milne (Sinn Féin) | Donal McPeake (Sinn Féin) | Jolene Groogan (Sinn Féin) | Denise Johnston (SDLP) | Anne Forde (DUP) |
| 2019 | Ian Milne (Sinn Féin) | Donal McPeake (Sinn Féin) | Catherine Elattar (Sinn Féin) | Derek McKinney (UUP) | Anne Forde (DUP) |
| December 2018 Co-Options | Ian Milne (Sinn Féin) | Donal McPeake (Sinn Féin) | Catherine Elattar (Sinn Féin) | Derek McKinney (UUP) | Anne Forde (DUP) |
| May 2017 Co-Option | Niamh Milne (Sinn Féin) | Peter Bateson (Sinn Féin) | Catherine Elattar (Sinn Féin) | Derek McKinney (UUP) | Anne Forde (DUP) |
| 2014 | Caoimhe O'Neill (Sinn Féin) | Peter Bateson (Sinn Féin) | Catherine Elattar (Sinn Féin) | Derek McKinney (UUP) | Anne Forde (DUP) |
| 2011 | Ian Milne (Sinn Féin) | Sean McPeake (Sinn Féin) | Caoimhe Scullion (Sinn Féin) | John Crawford (UUP) | Thomas Catherwood (DUP) |
| 2005 | Ian Milne (Sinn Féin) | Oliver Hughes (Sinn Féin) | James O'Neill (Sinn Féin) | John Crawford (UUP) | Thomas Catherwood (DUP) |
| 2001 | Patrick McErlean (SDLP) | Oliver Hughes (Sinn Féin) | James O'Neill (Sinn Féin) | John Junkin (UUP) | Thomas Catherwood (DUP) |
| 1997 | Patrick McErlean (SDLP) | Paul Henry (Sinn Féin) | Margaret McKenna (Sinn Féin) | John Junkin (UUP) | Thomas Catherwood (DUP) |
| 1993 | Patrick McErlean (SDLP) | Paul Henry (Sinn Féin) | Thomas Wilson (DUP) | John Junkin (UUP) | Thomas Catherwood (DUP) |
| 1989 | Henry McErlean (SDLP) | Pauline Davey-Kennedy (Sinn Féin) | Norman Montgomery (UUP) | John Junkin (UUP) | Thomas Catherwood (DUP) |
| 1985 | Henry McErlean (SDLP) | John Davey (Sinn Féin) | Thomas Milligan (DUP) | John Junkin (UUP) | Thomas Catherwood (DUP) |

== 2023 Election ==
2019: 3 x Sinn Féin, 1 x DUP, 1 x UUP

2023: 3 x Sinn Féin, 1 x DUP, 1 x SDLP

2019–2023 Change: SDLP gain from UUP

Moyola - 5 seats
| Party | Candidate | FPv% | Count | | | | | | | |
| Party | Candidate | FPv% | 1 | 2 | 3 | 4 | 5 | 6 | 7 | 8 |
|---|---|---|---|---|---|---|---|---|---|---|
| Sinn Féin | Ian Milne* | 24.24% | 2,219 | | | | | | | |
| Sinn Féin | Jolene Groogan | 20.47% | 1,874 | | | | | | | |
| DUP | Anne Forde* | 17.07% | 1,563 | | | | | | | |
| Sinn Féin | Donal McPeake* | 12.50% | 1,144 | 1,775.47 | | | | | | |
| SDLP | Denise Johnston | 7.11% | 651 | 676.73 | 888.70 | 1,022.20 | 1,220.96 | 1,221.14 | 1,227.91 | 1,486.61 |
| UUP | Derek McKinney* | 6.47% | 592 | 592.93 | 594.98 | 595.88 | 631.30 | 658.68 | 1,108.52 | 1,112.86 |
| Aontú | Sheila Fullerton | 3.79% | 347 | 368.39 | 445.88 | 528.98 | 558.06 | 558.38 | 561.46 | |
| TUV | Glenn Moore | 5.67% | 519 | 519.31 | 519.72 | 519.72 | 523.43 | 536.29 | | |
| Alliance | Caleb Ross | 2.70% | 247 | 251.03 | 299.82 | 325.32 | | | | |
Electorate: 13,524 Valid: 9,156 (67.70%) Spoilt: 90 Quota: 1,527 Turnout: 9,246 (68.37%)

== 2019 Election ==
2014: 3 x Sinn Féin, 1 x DUP, 1 x UUP

2019: 3 x Sinn Féin, 1 x DUP, 1 x UUP

2014–2019 Change: No change

Moyola – 5 seats
| Party | Candidate | FPv% | Count | | | |
| Party | Candidate | FPv% | 1 | 2 | 3 | 4 |
|---|---|---|---|---|---|---|
| Sinn Féin | Ian Milne* | 21.72% | 1,710 | | | |
| DUP | Anne Forde* | 20.56% | 1,619 | | | |
| Sinn Féin | Catherine Elattar* | 17.63% | 1,388 | | | |
| Sinn Féin | Donal McPeake* | 11.51% | 906 | 1,269.4 | 1,325.4 | |
| UUP | Derek McKinney* | 11.90% | 937 | 937.23 | 981.23 | 1,274.4 |
| SDLP | Denise Johnston | 11.69% | 920 | 936.79 | 1,159.01 | 1,163.76 |
| Alliance | Aidan Bradley | 3.79% | 298 | 301.91 | | |
| Workers' Party | Hugh Scullion | 1.21% | 95 | 100.29 | | |
Electorate: 12,727 Valid: 7,873 (61.86%) Spoilt: 111 Quota: 1,313 Turnout: 7,984 (62.73%)

== 2014 Election ==
2011: 3 x Sinn Féin, 1 x DUP, 1 x UUP

2014: 3 x Sinn Féin, 1 x DUP, 1 x UUP

2011–2014 Change: No change

Moyola - 5 seats
| Party | Candidate | FPv% | Count | |
| Party | Candidate | FPv% | 1 | 2 |
|---|---|---|---|---|
| Sinn Féin | Caoimhe O'Neill* †† | 19.32% | 1,431 | |
| DUP | Anne Forde* | 18.50% | 1,370 | |
| Sinn Féin | Catherine Elattar* | 16.96% | 1,256 | |
| UUP | Derek McKinney | 16.95% | 1,255 | |
| Sinn Féin | Peter Bateson* † | 14.71% | 1,089 | 1,274.08 |
| SDLP | Austin Kelly | 13.56% | 1,004 | 1,014.64 |
Electorate: 12,119 Valid: 7,405 (61.10%) Spoilt: 131 Quota: 1,235 Turnout: 7,536 (62.18%)

== 2011 Election ==
2005: 3 x Sinn Féin, 1 x DUP, 1 x UUP

2011: 3 x Sinn Féin, 1 x DUP, 1 x UUP

2005-2011 Change: No change

Moyola - 5 seats
| Party | Candidate | FPv% | Count | | | | |
| Party | Candidate | FPv% | 1 | 2 | 3 | 4 | 5 |
|---|---|---|---|---|---|---|---|
| Sinn Féin | Ian Milne* | 24.28% | 1,496 | | | | |
| DUP | Thomas Catherwood* | 17.09% | 1,053 | | | | |
| Sinn Féin | Sean McPeake* | 15.01% | 925 | 975.84 | 1,120.84 | | |
| Sinn Féin | Caoimhe Scullion | 8.73% | 538 | 908.14 | 1,055.14 | | |
| UUP | John Crawford* | 11.17% | 688 | 688.31 | 690.31 | 691.31 | 1,085.31 |
| SDLP | Ann-Marie McErlean | 8.55% | 527 | 539.09 | 610.05 | 643.05 | 664.05 |
| TUV | Alan Millar | 8.02% | 494 | 494.62 | 496.62 | 500.62 | |
| Independent | Oliver Hughes* | 7.14% | 440 | 462.63 | | | |
Electorate: 9,281 Valid: 6,161 (66.38%) Spoilt: 107 Quota: 1,027 Turnout: 6,268 (67.54%)

== 2005 Election ==
2001: 2 x Sinn Féin, 1 x DUP, 1 x UUP, 1 x SDLP

2005: 3 x Sinn Féin, 1 x DUP, 1 x UUP

2001-2005 Change: Sinn Féin gain from SDLP

Moyola - 5 seats
| Party | Candidate | FPv% | Count | | | | | |
| Party | Candidate | FPv% | 1 | 2 | 3 | 4 | 5 | 6 |
|---|---|---|---|---|---|---|---|---|
| DUP | Thomas Catherwood* | 23.84% | 1,557 | | | | | |
| Sinn Féin | James O'Neill* | 18.40% | 1,202 | | | | | |
| Sinn Féin | Oliver Hughes* | 17.44% | 1,139 | | | | | |
| UUP | John Crawford | 9.45% | 617 | 889.49 | 889.49 | 1,229.49 | | |
| Sinn Féin | Ian Milne | 12.72% | 831 | 831.31 | 933.19 | 938.37 | 938.37 | 980.21 |
| SDLP | Elizabeth Foster | 11.64% | 760 | 764.03 | 767.18 | 803.06 | 934.06 | 936.78 |
| Independent | John Junkin* | 6.52% | 426 | 603.94 | 604.84 | | | |
Electorate: 8,754 Valid: 6,532 (74.62%) Spoilt: 87 Quota: 1,089 Turnout: 6,619 (75.61%)

== 2001 Election ==
1997: 2 x Sinn Féin, 1 x DUP, 1 x UUP, 1 x SDLP

2001: 2 x Sinn Féin, 1 x DUP, 1 x UUP, 1 x SDLP

1997-2001 Change: No change

Moyola - 5 seats
| Party | Candidate | FPv% | Count | | | |
| Party | Candidate | FPv% | 1 | 2 | 3 | 4 |
|---|---|---|---|---|---|---|
| Sinn Féin | Oliver Hughes | 22.71% | 1,578 | | | |
| Sinn Féin | James O'Neill | 19.79% | 1,375 | | | |
| UUP | John Junkin* | 17.80% | 1,237 | | | |
| SDLP | Patrick McErlean* | 10.26% | 713 | 1,013.84 | 1,184.65 | |
| DUP | Thomas Catherwood* | 14.72% | 1,023 | 1,023.46 | 1,023.46 | 1,159.46 |
| SDLP | Elizabeth Foster | 5.51% | 383 | 488.34 | 529.57 | 549.95 |
| DUP | Anne Forde | 6.19% | 430 | 430.46 | 430.46 | 459.46 |
| Independent | Naaman Hutchinson | 3.02% | 210 | 215.06 | 216.92 | |
Electorate: 8,583 Valid: 6,949 (80.96%) Spoilt: 155 Quota: 1,159 Turnout: 7,104 (82.77%)

== 1997 Election ==
1993: 2 x DUP, 1 x Sinn Féin, 1 x UUP, 1 x SDLP

1997: 2 x Sinn Féin, 1 x DUP, 1 x UUP, 1 x SDLP

1993-1997 Change: Sinn Féin gain from DUP

Moyola - 5 seats
| Party | Candidate | FPv% | Count | | | | | | | |
| Party | Candidate | FPv% | 1 | 2 | 3 | 4 | 5 | 6 | 7 | 8 |
|---|---|---|---|---|---|---|---|---|---|---|
| Sinn Féin | Margaret McKenna* | 18.91% | 1,180 | | | | | | | |
| Sinn Féin | Paul Henry | 15.21% | 949 | 1,067.25 | | | | | | |
| UUP | John Junkin* | 14.13% | 882 | 882 | 922 | 922 | 1,231 | | | |
| DUP | Thomas Catherwood* | 13.28% | 829 | 829.11 | 913.11 | 913.11 | 980.11 | 1,106.4 | | |
| SDLP | Patrick McErlean* | 11.65% | 727 | 733.49 | 753.49 | 771.73 | 771.73 | 774.65 | 774.65 | 1,218.65 |
| DUP | Thomas Wilson* | 8.67% | 541 | 541 | 592 | 592 | 641 | 699.4 | 762.88 | 763.88 |
| SDLP | Francis Kearney | 7.50% | 468 | 470.2 | 477.42 | 485.28 | 485.28 | 487.47 | 488.39 | |
| UUP | Norman Montgomery | 5.80% | 362 | 362 | 431 | 431 | | | | |
| Ind. Unionist | James Mulholland | 4.01% | 250 | 250 | | | | | | |
| Workers' Party | Patrick Scullion | 0.85% | 53 | 53.66 | | | | | | |
Electorate: 8,175 Valid: 6,241 (76.34%) Spoilt: 135 Quota: 1,041 Turnout: 6,376 (77.99%)

== 1993 Election ==
1989: 2 x UUP, 1 x Sinn Féin, 1 x DUP, 1 x SDLP

1993: 2 x DUP, 1 x Sinn Féin, 1 x UUP, 1 x SDLP

1989-1993 Change: Sinn Féin gain from DUP

Moyola - 5 seats
| Party | Candidate | FPv% | Count | | | | | | |
| Party | Candidate | FPv% | 1 | 2 | 3 | 4 | 5 | 6 | 7 |
|---|---|---|---|---|---|---|---|---|---|
| SDLP | Patrick McErlean | 22.21% | 1,276 | | | | | | |
| Sinn Féin | Margaret McKenna* | 13.61% | 782 | 797.34 | 812.42 | 1,204.84 | | | |
| UUP | John Junkin* | 14.46% | 831 | 831 | 838 | 838 | 838 | 1,307.26 | |
| DUP | Thomas Catherwood* | 11.68% | 671 | 671 | 674 | 674 | 674 | 780 | 994.05 |
| DUP | Thomas Wilson | 11.70% | 672 | 672 | 672.26 | 672.26 | 672.26 | 745.26 | 834.06 |
| SDLP | Francis Madden | 4.56% | 262 | 529.54 | 610.46 | 642.14 | 720.8 | 720.8 | 723.02 |
| UUP | Norman Montgomery* | 11.40% | 655 | 655.26 | 658.26 | 658.26 | 658.26 | | |
| Sinn Féin | Paul Henry | 7.90% | 454 | 465.44 | 476 | | | | |
| Workers' Party | Patrick Scullion | 2.47% | 142 | 164.52 | | | | | |
Electorate: 7,935 Valid: 5,745 (72.40%) Spoilt: 179 Quota: 958 Turnout: 5,924 (74.66%)

== 1989 Election ==
1985: 2 x DUP, 1 x Sinn Féin, 1 x UUP, 1 x SDLP

1989: 2 x UUP, 1 x Sinn Féin, 1 x DUP, 1 x SDLP

1985-1989 Change: UUP gain from DUP

Moyola - 5 seats
| Party | Candidate | FPv% | Count | | | | | |
| Party | Candidate | FPv% | 1 | 2 | 3 | 4 | 5 | 6 |
|---|---|---|---|---|---|---|---|---|
| UUP | John Junkin* | 19.03% | 1,109 | | | | | |
| SDLP | Henry McErlean* | 15.05% | 877 | 940 | 940.48 | 1,290.48 | | |
| Sinn Féin | Pauline Davey-Kennedy | 15.98% | 931 | 950 | 950 | 976 | | |
| UUP | Norman Montgomery | 10.49% | 611 | 620 | 708.32 | 709.68 | 716.68 | 725.68 |
| DUP | Thomas Catherwood* | 11.91% | 694 | 696 | 714 | 715 | 718 | 724 |
| DUP | Thomas Milligan* | 9.59% | 559 | 562 | 586.24 | 587.24 | 588.24 | 588.24 |
| Sinn Féin | Margaret McKenna | 8.22% | 479 | 495 | 495 | 510 | 573 | |
| SDLP | Francis Madden | 6.30% | 367 | 425 | 425.48 | | | |
| Workers' Party | Hugh Scullion | 3.43% | 200 | | | | | |
Electorate: 7,941 Valid: 5,827 (73.38%) Spoilt: 182 Quota: 972 Turnout: 6,009 (75.67%)

== 1985 Election ==
1985: 2 x DUP, 1 x Sinn Féin, 1 x UUP, 1 x SDLP

Moyola - 5 seats
| Party | Candidate | FPv% | Count | | | | |
| Party | Candidate | FPv% | 1 | 2 | 3 | 4 | 5 |
|---|---|---|---|---|---|---|---|
| SDLP | Henry McErlean* | 15.23% | 904 | 1,200 | | | |
| Sinn Féin | John Davey | 15.97% | 948 | 965 | 1,030 | | |
| UUP | John Junkin* | 16.63% | 987 | 987 | 994 | | |
| DUP | Thomas Catherwood | 14.10% | 837 | 837 | 837 | 1,070 | |
| DUP | Thomas Milligan* | 12.15% | 721 | 722 | 722 | 900 | 978.44 |
| Sinn Féin | Francis McElwee | 12.47% | 740 | 752 | 818 | 818 | 818 |
| UUP | Alex Montgomery | 7.72% | 458 | 458 | 460 | | |
| SDLP | Francis Madden | 5.74% | 341 | | | | |
Electorate: 7,604 Valid: 5,936 (78.06%) Spoilt: 160 Quota: 990 Turnout: 6,096 (80.17%)
