= Duncan Pollock =

Ulster unionist (1929–2006)

Member of the Northern Ireland Assembly for Mid Ulster
- In office 28 June 1973 – 1974
- Preceded by: Assembly established
- Succeeded by: Assembly abolished

Member of Castlederg Rural District Council
- In office 1967 – 30 May 1973
- Succeeded by: Council abolished

Personal details
- Born: March 1929 Castlederg, County Tyrone, Northern Ireland
- Died: May 2006 (aged 77)
- Party: UPNI (1974–1981)
- Other political affiliations: Ulster Unionist (until 1974)

Thomas Duncan Pollock (March 1929 – May 2006) was a Northern Irish unionist politician.

== Biography ==
Born in Castlederg in County Tyrone, Pollock studied at Omagh Academy before becoming a farmer. In the mid-1950s, he was Chief Organiser of the Young Farmers' Clubs of Northern Ireland. He joined the Ulster Unionist Party (UUP) and was elected to Castlederg Rural District Council in 1967, serving until it was disbanded in 1973. He was also elected to the executive of the UUP.

At the 1973 Northern Ireland Assembly election, Pollock was elected in Mid Ulster, but by the Northern Ireland Constitutional Convention in 1975, he had joined the Unionist Party of Northern Ireland split and lost his seat.

In his spare time, Pollock enjoyed playing football and table tennis, and was active in the Presbyterian Church.

Northern Ireland Assembly (1973)
New assembly	Assembly Member for Mid-Ulster; 1973–1974	Assembly abolished
