= Sandra Overend =

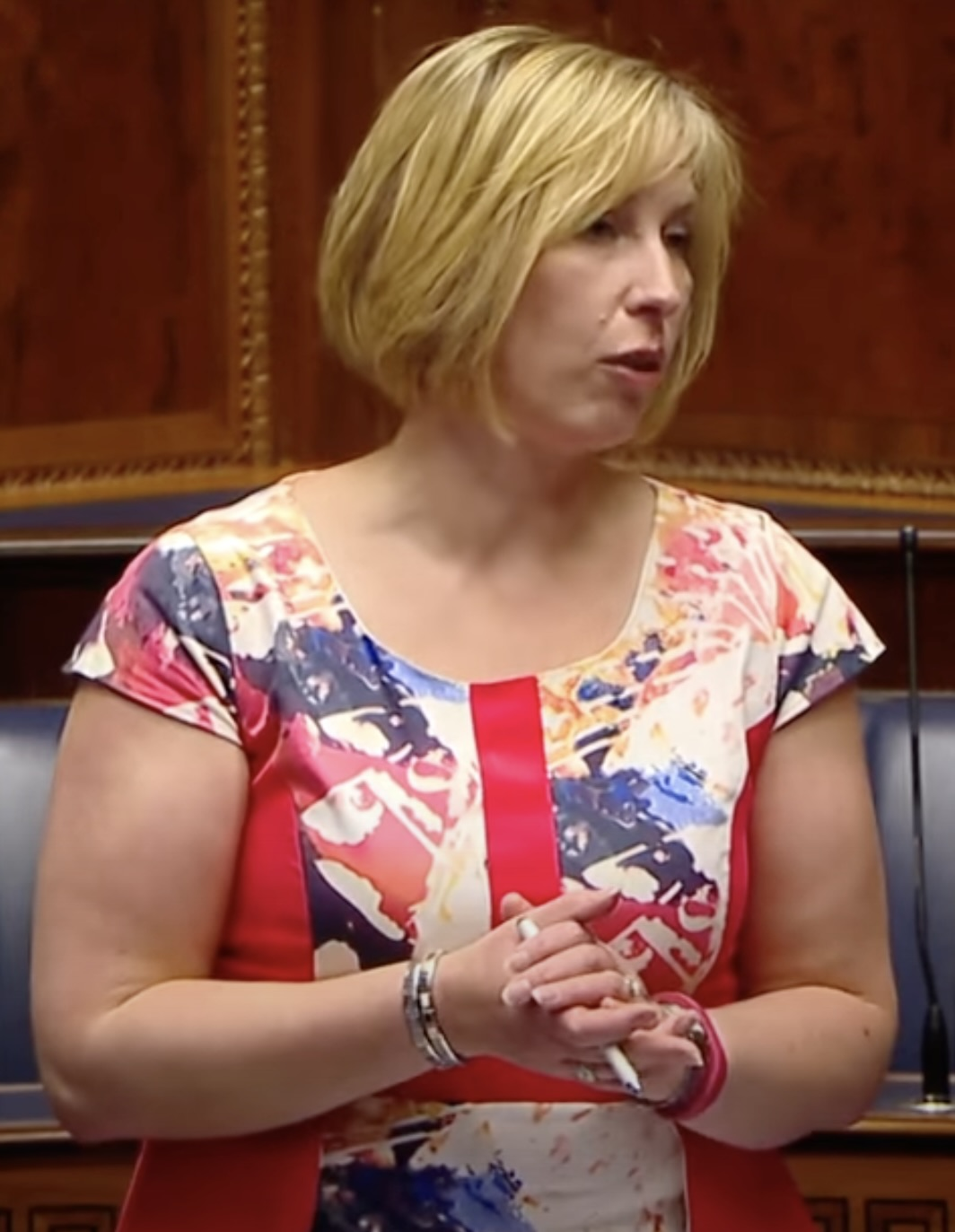
- Overend in 2015

Member of the Northern Ireland Assembly for Mid-Ulster
- In office 5 May 2011 – 3 March 2017
- Preceded by: Billy Armstrong
- Succeeded by: Seat abolished

Personal details
- Born: 11 May 1973 (age 53) Stewartstown, County Tyrone, Northern Ireland
- Party: Ulster Unionist Party
- Spouse: Nigel
- Children: 3
- Education: University of Ulster

Sandra Overend (born 11 May 1973) is an Ulster Unionist Party (UUP) politician in Northern Ireland. She served as a Member of the Legislative Assembly (MLA) for Mid-Ulster from 2011 to 2017.

== Background ==
Overend was born near Stewartstown, County Tyrone and educated at Cookstown High School and the University of Ulster. She lives near Bellaghy, County Londonderry. She is married with three children; her father-in-law is former Vanguard politician Robert Overend. She worked in accountancy before taking up employment as office manager for her father Billy Armstrong MLA in 1998. Overend is the Ulster Unionist Party Women's Development Officer.

Overend stood unsuccessfully in Mid Ulster at the 2010 UK general election, taking 11% of the vote and fourth place. She stood again in Mid Ulster in the 2015 general election, taking 15.4% of the vote and second place and overtaking the DUP.

Overend has said that there must be an equitable solution found for Northern Ireland's dairy farmers or else the industry runs the risk of being strangled by low prices. "Whilst Thursday's increase in the milk auction, 25.04ppl to 26.22ppl, is to be welcomed we must remember that exactly the same auction last year produced results of 29.53ppl. Therefore whilst milk prices may be rising from their cripplingly low 22ppl only a few months ago, they still have much further to go to simply match last year’s prices."

She was defeated at the 2017 Assembly election.

Northern Ireland Assembly
Preceded by Billy Armstrong	MLA for Mid-Ulster; 2011–2017	Seat abolished
