= Emma Sheerin =

Irish politician (born 1991/92)

Emma Sheerin MLA
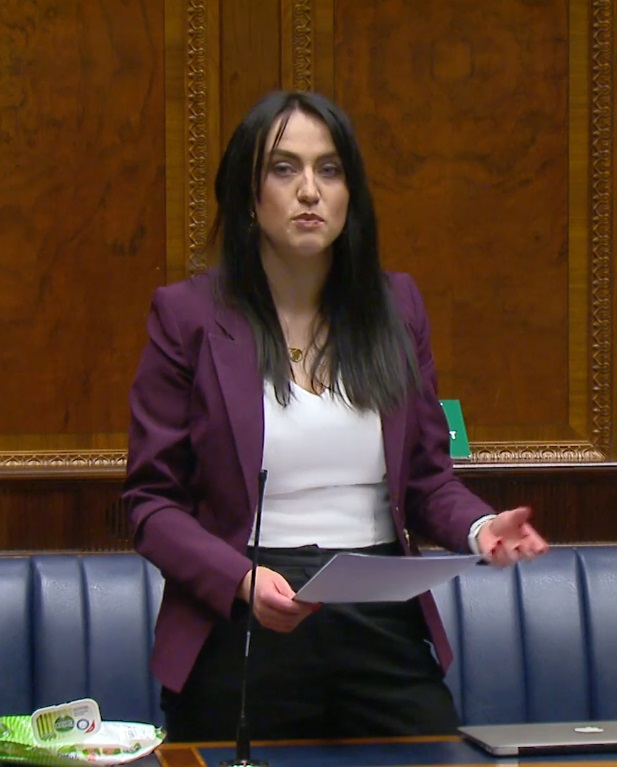
- Sheerin in 2021

Member of the Legislative Assembly for Mid Ulster
- Incumbent
- Assumed office 4 December 2018
- Preceded by: Ian Milne

Personal details
- Born: 1991 or 1992 (age 33–34) County Londonderry, Northern Ireland
- Party: Sinn Féin

Emma Sheerin (born 1991/92) is an Irish Sinn Féin politician from Draperstown, County Londonderry, Northern Ireland. Since 2018 she has been MLA for Mid Ulster.

== Background ==
Sheerin is a native of Ballinascreen where she attended St Colm's High School. She then proceeded to Queen's University, Belfast where she obtained a degree in Politics.

== Political career ==
Sheerin's Mid Ulster constituency, west of Lough Neagh and containing Magherafelt, Coalisland and Cookstown.

In December 2018, Sheerin was elected as a member of and Sinn Féin's Cúige Uladh Officer Board and the Ard Chomhairle.

Aged 26, she was selected to take Ian Milne's seat in the Northern Ireland Assembly for Mid Ulster. She was later named as Equality Spokesperson.

== Personal life ==
Sheerin lives in Ballinascreen.

Northern Ireland Assembly
Preceded by Ian Milne	MLA for Mid Ulster; 2018–present	Incumbent
