= 1985 Magherafelt District Council election =

Local govt election in Northern Ireland

← 1981	15 May 1985	1989 →

All 15 seats to Magherafelt District Council 8 seats needed for a majority
	First party	Second party	Third party
Party	SDLP	Sinn Féin	DUP
Seats won	4	4	4
Seat change	▼1	▲4	0
	Fourth party	Fifth party	Sixth party
Party	UUP	Ind. Republican	Irish Independence
Seats won	3	0	0
Seat change	▲1	▼2	▼1
	Seventh party
Party	UUUP
Seats won	0
Seat change	▼1

Elections to Magherafelt District Council were held on 15 May 1985 on the same day as the other Northern Irish local government elections. The election used three district electoral areas to elect a total of 15 councillors.

== Election results ==
Magherafelt District Council Election Result 1985
Party	Seats	Gains	Losses	Net gain/loss	Seats %	Votes %	Votes	+/−
SDLP	4	0	1	▼1	26.7	28.2	5,186	▲2.6
Sinn Féin	4	4	0	▲4	26.7	26.0	4,783	New
DUP	4	0	0	0	26.7	24.0	4,405	0.0
UUP	3	0	1	▼1	20.0	19.3	3,562	▲9.4
Workers' Party	0	0	0	0	0.0	1.3	239	▼0.2
Alliance	0	0	0	0	0.0	1.2	213	▼1.3

Note: "Votes" are the first preference votes.

== Districts summary ==
Results of the Magherafelt District Council election, 1985 by district
Ward	%	Cllrs	%	Cllrs	%	Cllrs	%	Cllrs	%	Cllrs	Total Cllrs
Ward	SDLP		Sinn Féin		DUP		UUP		Others		Total Cllrs
Magherafelt Town	23.1	1	20.4	1	34.5	2	18.6	1	3.4	0	5
Moyola	21.0	1	28.4	1	26.3	2	24.3	1	0.0	0	5
Sperrin	40.6	2	29.5	2	10.7	0	15.3	1	3.9	0	5
Total	28.2	4	26.0	4	24.0	4	19.3	3	2.5	0	15

== District results ==
=== Magherafelt Town ===
1985: 2 x DUP, 1 x SDLP, 1 x UUP, 1 x Sinn Féin

Magherafelt Town - 5 seats
Party	Candidate	FPv%	Count			
Party	Candidate	FPv%	1	2	3	4
DUP	William McCrea*	32.24%	2,050			
Sinn Féin	Bhrighde Mac Giolla	20.40%	1,297			
SDLP	Patrick Kilpatrick	16.80%	1,068			
UUP	Ernest Caldwell	13.38%	851	975.32	976.34	1,367.34
DUP	Barclay Morrow	2.28%	145	956.68	957.02	1,031.74
SDLP	Joseph McGlone	6.35%	404	406.4	616.86	687.1
UUP	James Artt	5.21%	331	367.48	367.82	
Alliance	Harold Hutchinson	3.35%	213	218.28	238	
Electorate: 8,009 Valid: 6,359 (79.40%) Spoilt: 81 Quota: 1,060 Turnout: 6,440 (80.41%)

=== Moyola ===
1985: 2 x DUP, 1 x Sinn Féin, 1 x UUP, 1 x SDLP

Moyola - 5 seats
Party	Candidate	FPv%	Count				
Party	Candidate	FPv%	1	2	3	4	5
SDLP	Henry McErlean*	15.23%	904	1,200			
Sinn Féin	John Davey	15.97%	948	965	1,030		
UUP	John Junkin*	16.63%	987	987	994		
DUP	Thomas Catherwood	14.10%	837	837	837	1,070	
DUP	Thomas Milligan*	12.15%	721	722	722	900	978.44
Sinn Féin	Francis McElwee	12.47%	740	752	818	818	818
UUP	Alex Montgomery	7.72%	458	458	460		
SDLP	Francis Madden	5.74%	341				
Electorate: 7,604 Valid: 5,936 (78.06%) Spoilt: 160 Quota: 990 Turnout: 6,096 (80.17%)

=== Sperrin ===
1985: 2 x SDLP, 2 x Sinn Féin, 1 x UUP

Sperrin - 5 seats
Party	Candidate	FPv%	Count				
Party	Candidate	FPv%	1	2	3	4	5
Sinn Féin	Patrick Doherty	16.87%	1,028				
SDLP	Patrick Sweeney*	10.59%	645	715	1,037		
SDLP	Mary McSorley*	14.20%	865	886	950	1,427	
Sinn Féin	Patrick Toner	12.64%	770	806	814	860	1,001
UUP	Walter Richardson	15.35%	935	945	946	950	959
DUP	John Linton*	10.70%	652	654	655	659	663
SDLP	John Bradley	8.32%	507	524	586		
SDLP	Francis McKendry*	7.42%	452	478			
Workers' Party	Francis Donnelly	3.92%	239				
Electorate: 7,558 Valid: 6,093 (80.62%) Spoilt: 108 Quota: 1,016 Turnout: 6,201 (82.05%)
