= Aidan Larkin =

Irish nationalist politician (1946–2019)

Aidan J. Larkin (31 March 1946 – 31 March 2019) was a former Irish nationalist politician.

Born near Cookstown, County Tyrone, Larkin studied at St Patrick's College, Armagh, University College Dublin and Queen's University Belfast. He qualified in law and joined the Bar of Northern Ireland, but worked instead as a teacher before becoming a full-time activist in the Social Democratic and Labour Party (SDLP).

A founder member of the SDLP, Larkin was its first chairman in Magherafelt, at the 1973 Northern Ireland local elections, Larkin was elected to Magherafelt District Council, and later in the year he won a seat in Mid Ulster on the Northern Ireland Assembly. However, he narrowly lost his seat at the Northern Ireland Constitutional Convention election in 1975, and left politics a few years later.

Larkin died on his 73rd birthday in 2019, having had Parkinson's disease for several years.

Northern Ireland Assembly (1973)
New assembly	Assembly Member for Mid-Ulster; 1973–1974	Assembly abolished
