= Robert Overend =

Unionist politician from Northern Ireland

Member of Magherafelt District Council
- In office 20 May 1981 – 15 May 1985
- Preceded by: Ian Davidson
- Succeeded by: District abolished
- Constituency: Magherafelt Area B

Member of the Northern Ireland Constitutional Convention for Mid Ulster
- In office 1975–1976

Personal details
- Born: December 1930
- Died: 25 June 2017 (aged 86)
- Party: United Ulster Unionist (1975 - 1984)
- Other political affiliations: Ulster Vanguard (until 1975)

Robert Overend (December 1930 – 25 June 2017) was a Northern Irish farmer, businessman and Unionist politician. He was also a deputy Grand Master of the Orange Order.

== Political career ==
Overend was a prominent member of the Vanguard Unionist Progressive Party in the mid-1970s. In 1975, he proposed that the Order formed a new, united unionist party, but this was rejected. He was elected for Vanguard to the Northern Ireland Constitutional Convention from Mid Ulster, In 1976, an unsuccessful attempt was made on his life by republican paramilitaries, including Paul McGlinchey, brother of Dominic McGlinchey.

Overend joined the United Ulster Unionist Party (UUUP) on its formation, and was elected to Magherafelt District Council for the new party at the 1977 local elections, holding his seat in 1981 local elections.

Overend stood for the UUUP again at the 1982 Northern Ireland Assembly election, but was not successful. In the run-up to the election, his son, Robert Andrew Overend (born 1957), was seriously injured by an Irish National Liberation Army (INLA) bomb. During the 1990s, he served as Deputy Grand Master of the Orange Order.

== Personal life and death ==
Outside politics, he worked as a pig farmer and was chair of the Ulster Pork and Bacon Forum. His daughter-in-law, Sandra Overend, is an Ulster Unionist member of the Northern Ireland Assembly. He also has another two sons and a daughter, Wesley, Nigel and Elizabeth.

Overend died on 25 June 2017, aged 86, following a long illness.

Northern Ireland Constitutional Convention
New convention	Member for Mid-Ulster; 1975–1976	Convention dissolved
