= Ian Milne =

Irish Republican politician

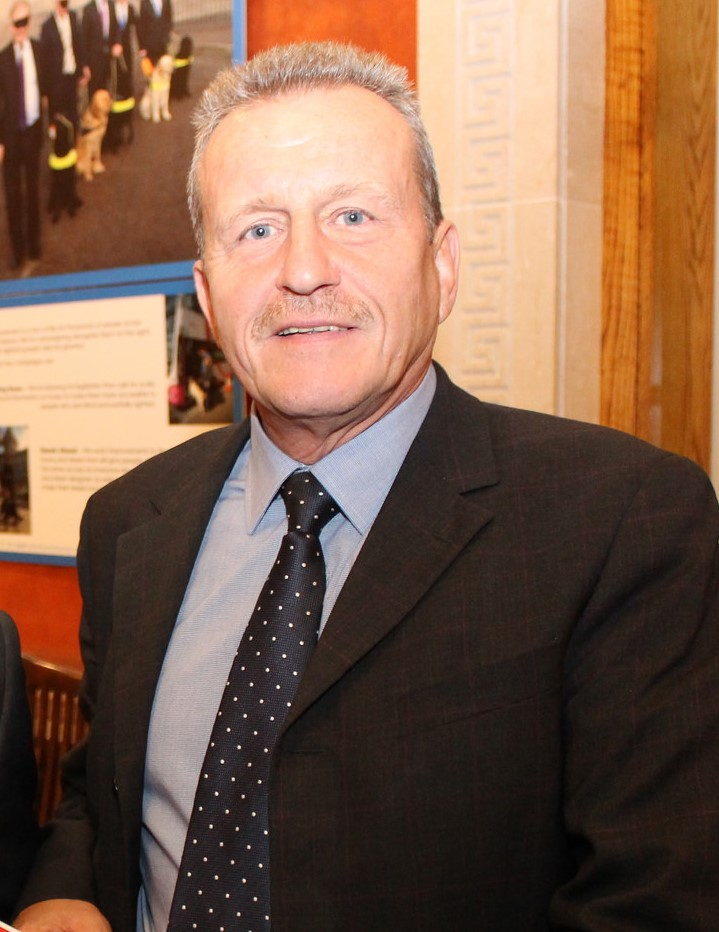

Member of Mid Ulster District Council
- Incumbent
- Assumed office 2 May 2019
- Preceded by: Niamh Milne
- Constituency: Moyola

Member of the Legislative Assembly for Mid Ulster
- In office 25 March 2013 – 1 December 2018
- Preceded by: Francie Molloy
- Succeeded by: Emma Sheerin

Member of Magherafelt District Council
- In office 5 May 2005 – 22 May 2014
- Preceded by: Patrick McErlean
- Succeeded by: Council abolished
- Constituency: Moyola

Personal details
- Born: Ian Patrick Milne; 8 April 1954 (age 72) Bellaghy, County Londonderry, Northern Ireland
- Party: Sinn Féin

Military service
- Paramilitaries: Provisional IRA (1971–1992); Fianna Éireann (1970–1971)
- Rank: Volunteer
- Unit: South Derry Brigade
- Battles/wars: The Troubles

Ian Milne (born 8 April 1954) is an Irish republican politician from Northern Ireland.

== Background ==
Born in Bellaghy, County Londonderry on 8 April 1954, he attended the same school as also future-Provisional IRA members Thomas McElwee, and Francis Hughes. Milne joined the Official IRA-aligned faction of the Fianna Éireann militant youth organisation soon after its formation at the age of 16, but the following year moved to join the Provisional IRA. He was convicted of illegal explosives possession in Crumlin Road Jail in 1971. He was apprehended after explosives went off in a car in which he was travelling. After serving 18 months, he escaped in January 1973 and continued his involvement in the Provisional IRA. The following year, he was arrested in the Republic of Ireland after stealing a Garda car, and in June 1974 he was sentenced to five years of penal servitude in Portlaoise Prison. However, several months later he was part of a successful prison break, and resumed his activities in Northern Ireland.

During the mid-1970s, the Royal Ulster Constabulary described Milne as one of its three "most wanted" men in the South Londonderry area, alongside Francis Hughes and Dominic McGlinchey. In 1977, he was arrested and received a life sentence for murder for the shooting of Ulster Defence Regiment (UDR) soldier, James Speer, in Desertmartin on 9 November 1976. Speer was shot whilst working in his garage. Serving time at Long Kesh, he participated in the blanket protest. He was released in 1992, having served 14 years.

At the 2005 Northern Ireland local elections, Milne was elected to Magherafelt District Council for Sinn Féin, and he held his seat in 2011. While on the council, he served two terms as chairman. In 2013, he was co-opted to the Northern Ireland Assembly in Mid Ulster, replacing Francie Molloy. He kept this seat when he was elected in 2016.

In September 2017 Milne was served a civil writ by the family of James Speer for his alleged involvement in the murder.

In December 2018, he resigned as MLA to seek re-election to Mid Ulster District Council. He was elected to Mid Ulster District Council in 2019, and re-elected in 2023.

Northern Ireland Assembly
Preceded by Francie Molloy	MLA for Mid Ulster; 2013–2018	Succeeded by Emma Sheerin
