= Mary McSorley =

Member of Magherafelt District Council
- In office 15 May 1985 – 19 May 1993
- Preceded by: District created
- Succeeded by: John Walsh
- Constituency: Sperrin
- In office 20 October 1981 – 15 May 1985
- Preceded by: John Henning
- Succeeded by: District abolished
- Constituency: Magherafelt Area A

Member of the Northern Ireland Assembly for Mid Ulster
- In office 20 October 1982 – 1986
- Preceded by: Assembly re-established
- Succeeded by: Assembly abolished

Personal details
- Party: Independent Nationalist (from 1989)
- Other political affiliations: Social Democratic and Labour (until 1989)

Mary Katherine McSorley MBE is a former Irish nationalist politician.

== Political career ==
McSorley joined the Social Democratic and Labour Party (SDLP), and was elected to Magherafelt District Council in 1981. She was then elected to the Northern Ireland Assembly in 1982, representing Mid Ulster.

In January 1989, McSorley accepted an MBE. This was against SDLP policy which stated that members should not accept British honours. It prompted talk of a split in the party, but McSorley was persuaded to resign. She held her council seat as an independent in 1989, but didn't stand for re-election in 1993.

Northern Ireland Assembly (1982)
New assembly	MPA for Mid Ulster; 1982–1986	Assembly abolished
