= Patsy Groogan =

Member of Magherafelt District Council
- In office 19 May 1993 – 5 May 2011
- Preceded by: Bernard O'Hagan
- Succeeded by: Brian McGuigan
- Constituency: Sperrin

Northern Ireland Forum Member for Mid Ulster
- In office 30 May 1996 – 25 April 1998
- Preceded by: New forum
- Succeeded by: Forum dissolved

Personal details
- Born: Ballinascreen, Northern Ireland
- Party: Independent Republican (since 2006)
- Other political affiliations: Sinn Féin (until 2006)

Patrick Groogan is an Irish republican politician.

== Background ==
Based in Ballinascreen, Groogan became a sports coach with a particular involvement in hurling. He became prominent in his local Gaelic Athletic Association, and joined Sinn Féin. In 1991, Bernard O'Hagan, a Sinn Féin councillor for the Sperrin area of the Magherafelt District Council, was assassinated, and Groogan was appointed as his replacement.

Groogan held the Sperrin seat, heading the poll in each council election from 1993 to 2005. He became the first Sinn Féin Chairperson of Magherafelt District Council, and served a second term starting in 2004. He was elected to the Northern Ireland Forum in Mid Ulster, but he did not stand in the subsequent 1998 Northern Ireland Assembly election.

In 2006, Groogan resigned from Sinn Féin, along with Oliver Hughes, but continued to sit on the council as an independent. Hughes described their resignations as "purely a domestic issue", but the Sunday Times speculated that they may have been in protest at a lack of internal party democracy.

Northern Ireland Forum
New forum	Member for Mid-Ulster; 1996–1998	Forum dissolved
