= John Junkin (politician) =

Northern Irish unionist politician

Member of Magherafelt District Council
- In office 15 May 1985 – 5 May 2005
- Preceded by: District created
- Succeeded by: John Crawford
- Constituency: Moyola
- In office 20 May 1981 – 15 May 1985
- Preceded by: Thomas Kelso
- Succeeded by: District abolished
- Constituency: Magherafelt Area B

Member of the Northern Ireland Forum for Mid Ulster
- In office 30 May 1996 – 25 April 1998

Personal details
- Born: 1949 (age 76–77) County Tyrone, Northern Ireland
- Party: Independent Unionist (2005)
- Other political affiliations: UUP (until 2005)

John Junkin (born 1949) is a former Northern Irish unionist politician.

== Background ==
Long active in the Ulster Unionist Party (UUP), Junkin was elected to Magherafelt District Council at the 1981 Northern Ireland local elections, and held a seat in Moyola in 1985, 1989 and 1993. By the start of the 1990s, he was a Vice-President of the UUP, serving alongside Ken Maginnis, Martin Smyth and Hazel Bradford.

Junkin was elected to the Northern Ireland Forum in 1996, representing Mid Ulster, and held his council seat in 1997, but lost out in the 1998 Northern Ireland Assembly election, to fellow party member Billy Armstrong.

Although Junkin was re-elected to Magherafelt Council in 2001, he then resigned from the UUP and stood as an independent in 2005. He lost his seat, defeated by new UUP candidate Jackie Crawford. He subsequently left politics, but hit the local news in 2007 after a boat which he had fitted out for the use of an autistic child was destroyed by arson.

Northern Ireland Forum
New forum	Member for Mid-Ulster; 1996–1998	Forum dissolved
