= Mid Ulster (Assembly constituency) =

Constituency of the Northern Ireland Assembly

Coordinates: 54°44′08″N 6°42′56″W

- Northern Ireland Assembly constituency
- Mid Ulster shown within Northern Ireland

Current constituency
- Created: 1973
- Seats: 6 (1996–2016); 5 (2017–)
- MLAs: Keith Buchanan (DUP); Linda Dillon (SF); Patsy McGlone (SDLP); Michelle O'Neill (SF); Emma Sheerin (SF)
- Districts: Mid-Ulster District Council

Mid Ulster is a constituency represented in the Northern Ireland Assembly.

It was first used for a Northern Ireland-only election in 1973, which elected the then Northern Ireland Assembly. It usually shares boundaries with the Mid Ulster UK Parliament constituency. However, the boundaries of the two constituencies were slightly different from 1983 to 1986 (because the Assembly boundaries had not caught up with Parliamentary boundary changes) and from 1996 to 1997, when members of the Northern Ireland Forum had been elected from the newly drawn Parliamentary constituencies but the 51st Parliament of the United Kingdom, elected in 1992 under the 1983-95 constituency boundaries, was still in session.

Members were then elected from the constituency to the 1975 Constitutional Convention, the 1982 Assembly, the 1996 Forum and then to the current Assembly from 1998.

Mid Ulster is the only constituency in Northern Ireland to have returned the same number of Assembly members from the same parties at each election before that of 2017 – 3 Sinn Féin, 1 SDLP, 1 UUP and 1 DUP.

The constituency's most prominent MLA has been Michelle O'Neill, who has been the First Minister of Northern Ireland since February 2024. O'Neill is the first nationalist and the second woman to hold the post.

For further details of the history and boundaries of the constituency, see Mid Ulster (UK Parliament constituency).

== Members ==
Election	MLA (party)	MLA (party)	MLA (party)	MLA (party)	MLA (party)	MLA (party)
1973	Paddy Duffy (SDLP)	Ivan Cooper (SDLP)	Aidan Larkin (SDLP)	William Thompson (UUP)	Duncan Pollock (UUP)	John Dunlop (Vanguard)
1975	Paddy Duffy (SDLP)	Ivan Cooper (SDLP)	Francis Thompson (UUP)	William Thompson (UUP)	Richard Reid (DUP)	Robert Overend (Vanguard)
1982	Danny Morrison (Sinn Féin)	Mary McSorley (SDLP)	Denis Haughey (SDLP)	William Thompson (UUP)	Alan Kane (DUP)	William McCrea (DUP)
1996	Patrick Groogan (Sinn Féin)	Francie Molloy (Sinn Féin)	Patsy McGlone (SDLP)	5 seats 1996–1998	John Junkin (UUP)	William McCrea (DUP)
1998	John Kelly (Sinn Féin)	Francie Molloy (Sinn Féin)	Martin McGuinness (Sinn Féin)	Denis Haughey (SDLP)	Billy Armstrong (UUP)	William McCrea (DUP)
2003	Geraldine Dougan (Sinn Féin)	Francie Molloy (Sinn Féin)	Martin McGuinness (Sinn Féin)	Patsy McGlone (SDLP)	Billy Armstrong (UUP)	William McCrea (DUP)
2007	Michelle O'Neill (Sinn Féin)	Francie Molloy (Sinn Féin)	Martin McGuinness (Sinn Féin)	Patsy McGlone (SDLP)	Billy Armstrong (UUP)	Ian McCrea (DUP)
2011	Michelle O'Neill (Sinn Féin)	Francie Molloy (Sinn Féin)	Martin McGuinness (Sinn Féin)	Patsy McGlone (SDLP)	Sandra Overend (UUP)	Ian McCrea (DUP)
April 2013 co-option	Michelle O'Neill (Sinn Féin)	Ian Milne (Sinn Féin)	Martin McGuinness (Sinn Féin)	Patsy McGlone (SDLP)	Sandra Overend (UUP)	Ian McCrea (DUP)
2016	Michelle O'Neill (Sinn Féin)	Ian Milne (Sinn Féin)	Linda Dillon (Sinn Féin)	Patsy McGlone (SDLP)	Sandra Overend (UUP)	Keith Buchanan (DUP)
2017	Michelle O'Neill (Sinn Féin)	Ian Milne (Sinn Féin)	Linda Dillon (Sinn Féin)	Patsy McGlone (SDLP)	5 seats 2017–present	Keith Buchanan (DUP)
December 2018 co-option	Michelle O'Neill (Sinn Féin)	Emma Sheerin (Sinn Féin)	Linda Dillon (Sinn Féin)	Patsy McGlone (SDLP)	5 seats 2017–present	Keith Buchanan (DUP)
2022	Michelle O'Neill (Sinn Féin)	Emma Sheerin (Sinn Féin)	Linda Dillon (Sinn Féin)	Patsy McGlone (SDLP)	5 seats 2017–present	Keith Buchanan (DUP)

Note: The columns in this table are used only for presentational purposes, and no significance should be attached to the order of columns. For details of the order in which seats were won at each election, see the detailed results of that election.

== Elections ==
=== Northern Ireland Assembly ===
==== 2027 ====
2027 Assembly election: Mid Ulster – 5 seats
Party	Candidate	FPv%	Count
Party	Candidate	FPv%	1
Sinn Féin	Linda Dillon		
UUP	Ian Irwin		
Sinn Féin	Ian Milne		
Sinn Féin	Michelle O'Neill		
SDLP	Malachy Quinn		
Sinn Féin	Emma Sheerin		

==== 2022 ====
2022 Assembly election: Mid Ulster – 5 seats
Party	Candidate	FPv%	Count							
Party	Candidate	FPv%	1	2	3	4	5	6	7	8
Sinn Féin	**Michelle O'Neill**	20.98%	**10,845**							
Sinn Féin	**Linda Dillon**	15.86%	8,199	**9,497**						
Sinn Féin	**Emma Sheerin**	15.89%	8,215	**8,716**						
DUP	**Keith Buchanan**	16.49%	8,521	8,523	8,523	8,531	8,601	**8,696**		
SDLP	**Patsy McGlone**	9.95%	5,144	5,420	5,888	5,997	6,183	6,640	6,956	**8,811**
TUV	Glenn Moore	7.39%	3,818	3,819	3,819	3,828	3,855	3,894	5,127	5,365
Alliance	Claire Hackett	4.14%	2,138	2,175	2,258	2,398	2,517	2,664	3,181	
UUP	Meta Graham	4.24%	2,191	2,192	2,193	2,204	2,221	2,228		
Aontú	Alixandra Halliday	2.52%	1,305	1,316	1,353	1,383	1,649			
Independent	Patrick Haughey	1.70%	877	887	908	969				
People Before Profit	Sophia McFeely	0.35%	179	180	186					
Green (NI)	Stefan Taylor	0.27%	137	140	150					
Workers' Party	Hugh Scullion	0.21%	107	114	125					
Resume NI	Conor Rafferty	0.03%	13	14	14					
Electorate: 75,168 Valid: 51,689 (68.76%) Spoilt: 585 Quota: 8,615 Turnout: 52,274 (69.54%)

==== 2017 ====
2017 Assembly election: Mid Ulster – 5 seats
Party	Candidate	FPv%	Count			
Party	Candidate	FPv%	1	2	3	4
Sinn Féin	**Michelle O'Neill**	20.65%	**10,258**			
DUP	**Keith Buchanan**	19.26%	**9,568**			
Sinn Féin	**Linda Dillon**	15.71%	7,806	**9,032.64**		
Sinn Féin	**Ian Milne**	16.39%	8,143	**8,553.21**		
SDLP	**Patsy McGlone**	12.92%	6,419	6,683.67	6,699.01	**7,732.97**
UUP	Sandra Overend	9.09%	4,516	4,519.42	5,260.03	7,052.41
TUV	Hannah Loughrin	2.50%	1,244	1,245.9	1,692.84	
Alliance	Fay Watson	2.05%	1,017	1,030.11	1,036.61	
Independent	Hugh McCloy	0.50%	247	253.84	256.96	
Green (NI)	Stefan Taylor	0.49%	243	246.04	247.73	
Workers' Party	Hugh Scullion	0.44%	217	221.37	222.15	
Electorate: 69,396 Valid: 49,678 (71.59%) Spoilt: 550 Quota: 8,280 Turnout: 50,853 (73.28%)

==== 2016 ====
2016 Assembly election: Mid Ulster – 6 seats
Party	Candidate	FPv%	Count									
Party	Candidate	FPv%	1	2	3	4	5	6	7	8	9	10
Sinn Féin	**Ian Milne**	17.26%	**7,035**									
SDLP	**Patsy McGlone**	15.24%	**6,209**									
Sinn Féin	**Michelle O'Neill**	15.09%	**6,147**									
Sinn Féin	**Linda Dillon**	14.31%	**5,833**									
UUP	**Sandra Overend**	11.93%	4,862	4,896	4,925.88	4,959.12	4,966.14	4,989.36	5,161.28	5,328.48	**6,155.48**	
DUP	**Keith Buchanan**	8.90%	3,628	3,634	3,639.88	3,683.36	3,686.6	3,691.65	3,705.05	3,752.24	4,353.94	**4,566.61**
DUP	Ian McCrea	9.24%	3,765	3,772	3,778	3,808.12	3,811.9	3,817.17	3,822.95	3,845.4	4,288.69	4,405.99
TUV	Hannah Loughrin	4.61%	1,877	1,883	1,888.04	1,981.04	1,982.66	1,990.38	2,006.21	2,046.68		
Workers' Party	Hugh Scullion	0.78%	316	918	1,043.64	1,052.84	1,197.83	1,414.75	1,778.95			
Alliance	Néidín Hendron	1.16%	471	718	861.88	875.96	959.39	1,162.57				
Green (NI)	Stefan Taylor	0.86%	349	581	639.92	650.52	727.47					
UKIP	Alan Day	0.63%	256	270	276.96							
Electorate: 70,430 Valid: 40,748 (57.86%) Spoilt: 633 Quota: 5,822 Turnout: 41,381 (58.75%)

==== 2011 ====
2011 Assembly election: Mid Ulster – 6 seats
Party	Candidate	FPv%	Count						
Party	Candidate	FPv%	1	2	3	4	5	6	7
Sinn Féin	**Martin McGuinness**	20.96%	**8,957**						
DUP	**Ian McCrea**	16.68%	**7,127**						
SDLP	**Patsy McGlone**	11.85%	5,065	5,482.28	5,511.23	5,727.77	**6,109.77**		
UUP	**Sandra Overend**	10.32%	4,409	4,412.52	5,106.72	5,229.32	5,336.14	**7,130.14**	
Sinn Féin	**Michelle O'Neill**	12.12%	5,178	5,514.96	5,515.41	5,542.05	5,591.36	5,710.25	**5,735.25**
Sinn Féin	**Francie Molloy**	9.97%	4,263	4,812.76	4,813.66	4,842.86	4,928.82	5,179.5	**5,190.5**
Sinn Féin	Ian Milne	6.17%	2,635	3,962.04	3,962.34	4,005.42	4,133.42	4,412.21	4,457.21
TUV	Walter Millar	4.86%	2,075	2,087.48	2,330.33	2,382.63	2,431.1		
SDLP	Austin Kelly	2.84%	1,214	1,262	1,266.05	1,331.62	1,429.36		
Independent	Hugh McCloy	2.18%	933	988.68	1,003.23	1,206.83			
Alliance	Michael McDonald	0.93%	398	405.36	416.61				
People Before Profit	Harry Hutchinson	0.57%	243	249.4	261.55				
Independent	Gary McCann	0.56%	241	252.84	255.39				
Electorate: 66,602 Valid: 42,738 (64.17%) Spoilt: 784 Quota: 6,106 Turnout: 43,522 (65.35%)

==== 2007 ====
2007 Assembly election: Mid Ulster – 6 seats
Party	Candidate	FPv%	Count						
Party	Candidate	FPv%	1	2	3	4	5	6	7
Sinn Féin	**Martin McGuinness**	18.21%	**8,065**						
DUP	**Ian McCrea**	17.18%	**7,608**						
Sinn Féin	**Francie Molloy**	14.90%	**6,597**						
Sinn Féin	**Michelle O'Neill**	14.53%	**6,432**						
SDLP	**Patsy McGlone**	11.24%	4,976	6,176.04	6,183.08	6,264.48	**6,430.48**		
UUP	**Billy Armstrong**	10.80%	4,781	4,788.22	4,939.9	4,940.45	5,036.53	5,572.54	**6,354.54**
SDLP	Kathleen Lagan	6.23%	2,759	3,118.1	3,119.86	3,266.93	3,469.14	3,497	3,531
DUP	Elizabeth Forde	2.31%	1,021	1,022.52	2,026.04	2,026.04	2,068.03	2,625.23	
UK Unionist	Walter Millar	2.73%	1,210	1,215.7	1,256.98	1,257.64	1,299.02		
Republican Sinn Féin	Brendan McLaughlin	0.99%	437	527.06	527.22	543.61			
Alliance	Margaret Marshall	0.50%	221	228.98	230.26	233.12			
Independent	Harry Hutchinson	0.38%	170	197.36	204.56	208.08			
Electorate: 61,223 Valid: 44,277 (72.32%) Spoilt: 451 Quota: 6,326 Turnout: 44,728 (73.06%)

==== 2003 ====
2003 Assembly election: Mid Ulster – 6 seats
Party	Candidate	FPv%	Count							
Party	Candidate	FPv%	1	2	3	4	5	6	7	8
DUP	**William McCrea**	18.51%	**8,211**							
Sinn Féin	**Martin McGuinness**	18.32%	**8,128**							
Sinn Féin	**Francie Molloy**	11.85%	5,255	5,255.44	**6,377.22**					
Sinn Féin	**Geraldine Dougan**	13.14%	5,827	5,827.22	5,998.38	**6,916.38**				
UUP	**Billy Armstrong**	9.74%	4,323	4,461.6	4,461.82	4,509.24	4,514.24	6,165.32	**7,048.32**	
SDLP	**Patsy McGlone**	9.68%	4,295	4,300.06	4,505.32	4,693.64	4,950.64	4,984.84	5,140.22	**5,246.22**
SDLP	Denis Haughey	8.66%	3,843	3,844.32	3,940.46	4,111.34	4,212.34	4,250.44	4,458.68	4,611.68
DUP	Alan Millar	2.32%	1,029	2,565.7	2,571.64	2,580.52	2,581.52	3,035.32		
UUP	Trevor Wilson	4.67%	2,071	2,182.54	2,183.64	2,228.52	2,233.52			
Sinn Féin	Cora Groogan	2.22%	984	984	1,144.16					
Workers' Party	Francis Donnelly	0.52%	230	230.22	237.48					
Alliance	James Holmes	0.37%	166	167.1	168.86					
Electorate: 60,095 Valid: 44,362 (73.82%) Spoilt: 661 Quota: 6,338 Turnout: 45,023 (74.92%)

==== 1998 ====
1998 Assembly election: Mid Ulster – 6 seats
Party	Candidate	FPv%	Count					
Party	Candidate	FPv%	1	2	3	4	5	6
DUP	**William McCrea**	20.76%	**10,339**					
Sinn Féin	**Martin McGuinness**	17.48%	**8,703**					
UUP	**Billy Armstrong**	9.03%	4,498	4,694.54	4,915.5	4,916.22	6,881.06	**7,467.06**
Sinn Féin	**Francie Molloy**	12.06%	6,008	6,009.55	6,040.55	7,074.11	7,075.73	**7,083.18**
SDLP	**Denis Haughey**	12.87%	6,410	6,413.72	6,652.03	6,736.81	6,768.74	**7,050.98**
Sinn Féin	**John Kelly**	11.23%	5,594	5,595.86	5,657.86	5,899.42	5,901.42	**5,913.63**
SDLP	Patsy McGlone	9.37%	4,666	4,676.85	4,781.85	4,956.63	4,969.63	5,075.79
DUP	Paul McLean	0.62%	307	3,008.34	3,034.54	3,041.56	3,727.84	
UUP	John Junkin	4.90%	2,440	2,680.87	2,758.66	2,758.84		
Alliance	Yvonne Boyle	1.00%	497	499.48				
Workers' Party	Francis Donnelly	0.42%	207	207.62				
Socialist Party	Harry Hutchinson	0.18%	91	105.57				
Natural Law	Mary Daly	0.08%	38	38				
Electorate: 59,991 Valid: 49,798 (83.01%) Spoilt: 824 Quota: 7,115 Turnout: 50,622 (84.38%)

=== 1996 forum ===
Successful candidates are shown in bold.

Party	Candidate(s)	Votes	Percentage
Sinn Féin	**Francie Molloy**; **Patsy Groogan**; Sean Begley; Margaret McKenna; Owen Carron	13,001	29.6
SDLP	**Patsy McGlone**; Denis Haughey; Kathleen Lagan; Pat McErlean; Joe McBride	12,492	28.5
UUP	**John Junkin**; Norman Badger; Trevor Wilson	7,935	18.1
DUP	**William McCrea**; William Larmour; Paul McLean	7,243	16.5
Alliance	Aidan Lagan; Keith Jacques	549	1.2
UK Unionist	Daniel Huston; Hugh Moore	435	1.0
PUP	John Coyle; Kenneth Rutherford	380	0.9
Ulster Democratic	John Haveron; James English	375	0.9
Labour coalition	Harry Hutchinson; Anne Gribbon; John McLaughlin; Paddy McGrath; Joanne Kane	271	0.6
Ulster Independence	Walter Millar; Dierdre Speer-White	263	0.6
NI Women's Coalition	Cherry Dickson; Ann McCrystal; Sheila Murphy; Mary Hogg; Mary Doyle	259	0.6
Workers' Party	Francie Donnelly; Gerard Brennan	210	0.5
Green (NI)	David Lyttle; Lucille O'Shea	132	0.3
NI Conservatives	Elspeth Irvine; Eileen Elizabeth McKee	119	0.3
Democratic Partnership	Charles McKee; Patrick Pearse Kelly	93	0.2
Democratic Left	Patricia Cullen; Frank McElroy	41	0.1
Natural Law	Stewart Luck; Richard Mulholland	24	0.1
Independent Chambers	Angela Moore; Linda Chambers	20	0.1

=== 1982 Assembly election ===
1982 Assembly election: Mid Ulster – 6 seats
Party	Candidate	FPv%	Count											
Party	Candidate	FPv%	1	2	3	4	5	6	7	8	9	10	11	12
DUP	**William McCrea**	16.86%	**10,445**											
SDLP	**Denis Haughey**	13.58%	8,413	8,413.6	8,474.6	8,805.6	8,827.6	**10,236.6**						
UUP	**William Thompson**	8.95%	5,546	5,594	5,594.45	5,597.45	5,772.3	5,773.3	5,773.3	6,108.75	7,343.4	**11,830.4**		
DUP	**Alan Kane**	6.42%	3,981	5,300.7	5,306.7	5,321	5,566.75	5,572.9	5,572.9	5,628.8	7,075.1	8,238.35	**11,167.63**	
SDLP	**Mary McSorley**	6.73%	4,169	4,169.6	4,196.6	4,366.75	4,371.9	5,535.35	6,787.79	7,979.33	7,982.48	8,018.63	8,034.27	**8,184.23**
Sinn Féin	**Danny Morrison**	11.18%	6,927	6,927.75	7,022.75	7,117.75	7,120.75	7,211.75	7,222.53	7,379.35	7,387.65	7,400.8	7,402.64	**7,414.6**
Sinn Féin	Francis McElwee	9.30%	5,763	5,764.05	5,867.65	6,075.65	6,083.65	6,150.95	6,161.73	6,333.65	6,334.8	6,334.8	6,335.72	6,343.08
UUP	Samuel Glasgow	6.69%	4,143	4,157.85	4,157.85	4,174.85	4,715.05	4,717.05	4,717.05	4,954.2	6,002.3			
UUUP	Robert Overend	4.93%	3,056	3,188.45	3,188.45	3,191.75	3,792.9	3,794.9	3,794.9	3,923.95				
Alliance	Aidan Lagan	4.63%	2,872	2,874.7	2,919.7	3,184.7	3,236.7	3,415.7	3,478.42					
SDLP	Liam McQuaid	4.62%	2,862	2,863.2	2,911.35	3,006.35	3,015.35							
UUUP	John Dunlop	2.80%	1,732	1,768.75	1,770.75	1,816.75								
Workers' Party	Francie Donnelly	2.12%	1,311	1,311.9	1,622.9									
Workers' Party	Francie McElroy	1.20%	746	747.8										
Electorate: 84,699 Valid: 61,966 (73.16%) Spoilt: 1,977 Quota: 8,853 Turnout: 63,943 (75.49%)

=== 1975 Constitutional Convention ===
1975 Constitutional Convention: Mid Ulster – 6 seats
Party	Candidate	FPv%	Count										
Party	Candidate	FPv%	1	2	3	4	5	6	7	8	9	10	11
UUP	**William Thompson**	16.54%	**9,342**										
SDLP	**Ivan Cooper**	16.07%	**9,073**										
DUP	**Richard Reid**	14.61%	**8,250**										
SDLP	**Paddy Duffy**	7.31%	4,130	4,130	4,809.14	4,848.31	4,934.07	5,129.95	5,141.39	6,418.6	7,003.32	**8,119.32**	
UUP	**Francis Thompson**	7.60%	4,292	5,426.9	5,427.34	5,430.34	5,430.34	5,456.99	6,655.14	6,658.27	6,667.38	7,221.77	**7,275.79**
Vanguard	**Robert Overend**	9.87%	5,573	5,624.74	5,624.85	5,626.85	5,626.85	5,645.09	5,968.25	5,980.36	6,003.36	6,206.41	**6,315.65**
SDLP	Aidan Larkin	6.85%	3,868	3,868	3,959.63	3,967.51	3,987.75	4,031.28	4,054.28	4,994	5,304.58	6,190.51	6,190.53
Alliance	Aidan Lagan	3.26%	1,842	1,844.47	1,865.7	1,870.25	1,910.24	3,018.53	3,624.31	4,105.7	4,425.43		
Republican Clubs	Francie Donnelly	2.46%	1,387	1,387	1,415.05	2,152.55	3,193.88	3,276.16	3,278.27	3,357.92			
SDLP	Stephen McKenna	4.79%	2,705	2,705.13	2,787.3	2,797.4	2,862.61	2,888.15	2,892.37				
Unionist Party NI	Duncan Pollock	4.01%	2,264	2,284.04	2,285.12	2,286.12	2,288.12	2,355.97					
Alliance	Douglas Cooper	2.70%	1,526	1,528.34	1,568.6	1,628.91	1,641.02						
Republican Clubs	Francie McElroy	2.25%	1,270	1,270	1,275.17	1,338.5							
Republican Clubs	Ivan Barr	1.68%	947	947	963.39								
Electorate: 80,806 Valid: 56,469 (69.88%) Spoilt: 2,080 Quota: 8,068 Turnout: 58,549 (72.46%)

=== 1973 Assembly election ===
1973 Assembly election: Mid Ulster – 6 seats
Party	Candidate	FPv%	Count												
Party	Candidate	FPv%	1	2	3	4	5	6	7	8	9	10	11	12	13
SDLP	**Ivan Cooper**	19.71%	**12,614**												
UUP	**Duncan Pollock**	14.93%	**9,557**												
SDLP	**Paddy Duffy**	6.93%	4,437	6,594.03	6,600.84	6,600.96	6,610.97	6,936.21	7,446.02	7,450.1	8,014	**9,491**			
Vanguard	**John Dunlop**	11.06%	7,082	7,089.83	7,096.1	7,103.46	7,117.58	7,125.66	7,132.2	7,538.04	7,596.71	7,622.06	**11,276.06**		
UUP	**William Thompson**	8.36%	5,352	5,353.08	5,358.08	5,490.28	5,517.72	5,520.72	5,521.99	8,048.66	8,604.58	8,613.7	**9,550.7**		
SDLP	**Aidan Larkin**	6.32%	4,045	4,606.06	4,629.22	4,629.22	4,636.19	4,693.88	4,918.18	4,920.22	5,306.51	5,986.56	5,991.87	6,006.87	**6,017.87**
SDLP	Stephen McKenna	3.82%	2,444	2,719.67	2,726.29	2,726.37	2,763.8	2,794.55	4,127.67	4,127.94	4,753.7	5,360.13	5,376.91	5,392.91	5,401.91
DUP	Eddie Sayers	6.96%	4,454	4,455.89	4,459.16	4,459.16	4,485.32	4,503.02	4,507.29	4,671	4,755.4	4,782.67			
Republican Clubs	Desmond Gourley	4.53%	2,899	2,929.24	2,935.24	2,935.48	2,952.29	4,148.76	4,460.63	4,463.71	4,663.16				
Alliance	Tom Gormley	3.21%	2,055	2,147.88	2,289.15	2,290.75	3,580.92	3,665.86	3,914.77	4,029					
UUP	Verdun Wright	4.74%	3,034	3,035.35	3,043.35	3,254.35	3,332.91	3,334.91	3,340.18						
Nationalist	Patrick Francis McGill	4.00%	2,558	2,692.19	2,696.27	2,696.31	2,706.47	2,794.24							
Republican Clubs	Ivan Barr	2.74%	1,755	1,857.06	1,859.33	1,859.45	1,866.72								
Alliance	Robin Glendinning	2.17%	1,389	1,410.6	1,541.87	1,543.99									
Alliance	George Logue	0.53%	339	347.1											
Electorate: 79,331 Valid: 64,014 (80.69%) Spoilt: 1,372 Quota: 9,145 Turnout: 65,386 (82.42%)
