= Magherafelt District Council =

Former district council in Northern Ireland

Coordinates: 54.752°N 6.601°W

Magherafelt District
- Area: 573 km^{2} (221 sq mi); Ranked 12th of 26
- District HQ: Magherafelt
- Catholic: 66%
- Protestant: 31.5%
- Country: Northern Ireland
- Sovereign state: United Kingdom
- Councillors: MLAs Mid Ulster Sinn Féin: 3 DUP: 1 SDLP: 1; MPs Francie Molloy (Sinn Féin)
- Website: www.magherafelt.gov.uk

Magherafelt District Council was a district council in County Londonderry in Northern Ireland. It was merged with Cookstown District Council and Dungannon and South Tyrone Borough Council on 1 April 2015 under local government reorganisation in Northern Ireland becoming Mid-Ulster District Council.

The council headquarters were in Magherafelt. The Council area stretched from Lough Neagh and the River Bann in the east into the Sperrin Mountains in the west and was divided by the Moyola River. It covered an area of 214 square miles (550 km^{2}) and had a population of over 45,000. Local towns in the area included Bellaghy, birthplace of poet Seamus Heaney in 1939.

The council was composed of 16 elected representatives. Local elections were held every four years on a proportional representation system. At its last election, in May 2011, those elected were from the following political parties: 9 Sinn Féin, 3 Democratic Unionist Party (DUP), 2 Social Democratic and Labour Party (SDLP) and 2 Ulster Unionist Party (UUP). The chairman and vice-chairman are elected on an annual basis at the annual general meeting in May or June. The final (2013/14) chairman was Councillor Catherine Elattar (SF), who represented the Magherafelt Town electoral area, and the vice-chair was Councillor Anne Forde (DUP), who represented the Sperrin electoral area. This was the second occasion on which Magherafelt District Council had elected two women to the top two positions.

For elections to the Westminster Parliament it is part of the Mid Ulster constituency.

== 2011 election results ==
| Party | | seats | change +/- |
|---|---|---|---|
| • | Sinn Féin | 9 | +1 |
| • | Democratic Unionist Party | 3 | -1 |
| • | Social Democratic and Labour Party | 2 | = |
| • | Ulster Unionist Party | 2 | = |

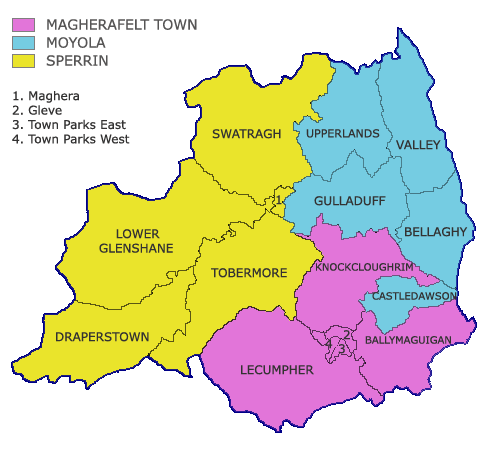
Map depicting boundaries of Magherafelt District Council electoral regions and wards

== Electoral regions ==
Magherafelt District Council was divided into three electoral regions; Magherafelt Town, Moyola, and Sperrin, each of which was further divided into electoral wards; six in Magherafelt Town and five in both Moyola and Sperrin.

== Review of Public Administration ==
Under the Review of Public Administration (RPA) the council merged with Cookstown District Council and Dungannon and South Tyrone Borough Council in 2014 to form a single council, named Mid-Ulster District Council, for the enlarged area totalling 1714 km^{2} and a population of 120, 096. The formation and election to this new council was due to take place in May 2009, but on 25 April 2008, Shaun Woodward, Secretary of State for Northern Ireland announced that the scheduled 2009 district council elections were to be postponed until the introduction of the eleven new councils in 2011. The introduction of this new super-council however was postponed but the election for it finally took place in 2014 with reorganisation completed in 2015.

== Population ==
The area covered by Magherafelt District Council had a population of 45,038 residents according to the 2011 Northern Ireland census.

== See also ==
- Local government in Northern Ireland
