= Sinn Féin Westminster election results =

UK political party election results

This article lists Sinn Féin's election results in UK parliamentary elections.

== Summary of general election performance ==
Year	Number of Candidates	Total votes	Average votes per candidate	% UK vote	% NI vote	Change (percentage points)	Saved deposits	Number of MPs
1918	102	497,211	6,457 (Note: Average for the 77 contested seats; i.e. excluding the 25 uncontested seats.)	4.6	19.0	N/A	93	73 / 105
1924	5	34,181	6,836	0.2	0.5	N/A	2	0 / 13
1950	2	23,362	11,681	0.1	0.3	N/A	1	0 / 12
1955	12	152,310	12,693	0.6	23.5	N/A	7	2 / 12
1959	12	63,415	5,285	0.2	11.0	−0.4	5	0 / 12
1983	14	102,701	7,336	0.3	13.6	N/A	7	1 / 17
1987	14	83,389	5,956	0.3	11.4	0.0	10	1 / 17
1992	14	78,291	5,592	0.2	10.0	−0.1	9	0 / 17
1997	17	126,921	7,466	0.4	16.0	+0.2	13	2 / 18
2001	18	175,933	9,774	0.7	21.7	+0.3	14	4 / 18
2005	18	174,530	9,696	0.6	24.3	−0.1	14	5 / 18
2010	17	171,942	10,114	0.6	25.5	0.0	13	5 / 18
2015	18	176,232	9,791	0.6	24.5	0.0	14	4 / 18
2017	18	238,915	13,273	0.7	29.4	+0.1	14	7 / 18
2019	15	181,853	12,124	0.6	22.8	-0.1	13	7 / 18
2024	14	210,891	15,063	0.7	27.0	+4.2	14	7 / 18

=== Notes ===
For the 1918 election, MPs are given out of the Ireland total. For subsequent elections, MP totals are for Northern Ireland.

Four Sinn Féin candidates were elected in two constituencies each, so Sinn Féin actually had 69 out of 101 Irish MPs. In what was to become Northern Ireland, Sinn Féin won 3 seats out of a possible 30.

== Election results ==
=== By-elections, 1906–10 ===
Election	Candidate	Votes	%	Position
1908 North Leitrim by-election	Charles Dolan	1,157	27.2	2

=== By-elections, 1910–18 ===
Election	Candidate	Votes	%	Position
1917 North Roscommon by-election	George Noble Plunkett (Note: Griffith's Sinn Féin party was one of several groups to endorse Plunkett's candidacy. Plunkett used the Sinn Féin slogan but was not a member of the same party as Griffith until the October 1917 reconstitution of Sinn Féin under Éamon de Valera.)	3,022	55.9	1
1917 South Longford by-election	Joseph McGuinness	1,498	50.6	1
1917 East Clare by-election	Éamon de Valera	5,010	71.1	1
1917 Kilkenny City by-election	W. T. Cosgrave	772	66.3	1
1918 South Armagh by-election	Patrick McCartan	1,305	35.6	2
1918 Waterford City by-election	Vincent White	764	38.1	2
1918 East Tyrone by-election	Vincent White	745	29.3	2
1918 Tullamore by-election	Patrick McCartan	unopposed	N/A	1
1918 East Cavan by-election	Arthur Griffith	3,785	59.5	1

=== 1918 general election ===
Constituency	Candidate	Votes	%	Position
Belfast Cromac	Archibald Savage	997	6.7	3
Belfast Duncairn	Russell McNabb	271	1.9	3
Belfast Falls	Éamon de Valera	3,245	27.7	2
Belfast Ormeau	James Joseph Dobbyn	338	2.7	3
Belfast Pottinger	Bernard Campbell	393	3.2	4
Belfast St Anne's	Dermot Barnes	1,341	11.0	3
Belfast Shankill	Michael Carolan	534	3.3	3
Belfast Victoria	Winifred Carney	539	4.1	3
Belfast Woodvale	Robert Haskin	1,247	9.3	2
County Carlow	James Lennon	unopposed	N/A	1
Cork City	J. J. Walsh	20,801	34.3	1
Cork City	Liam de Róiste	20,506	33.8	2 (Note: Cork City was a 2-seat constituency, with Sinn Féin taking both seats.)
County Louth	John J. O'Kelly	10,770	50.6	1
County Waterford	Cathal Brugha	12,890	75.4	1
Dublin Clontarf	Richard Mulcahy	5,974	64.9	1
Dublin College Green	Seán T. O'Kelly	9,662	77.2	1
Dublin Harbour	Philip Shanahan	7,708	58.9	1
Dublin Pembroke	Desmond FitzGerald	6,114	47.5	1
Dublin Rathmines	Patrick Little	5,566	37.7	2
Dublin St James's	Joseph McGrath	6,356	80.1	1
Dublin St Michan's	Michael Staines	7,553	65.4	1
Dublin St Patrick's	Constance Markievicz	7,835	65.9	1
Dublin St Stephen's Green	Thomas Kelly	8,461	59.9	1
East Antrim	Daniel Dumigan	861	5.4	2
East Cavan	Arthur Griffith	unopposed	N/A	1
East Clare	Éamon de Valera	unopposed	N/A	1
East Cork	David Kent	unopposed	N/A	1
East Donegal	Samuel O'Flaherty	46	0.4	2
East Down	Russell McNabb	3,876	27.3	3
East Galway	Liam Mellows	unopposed	N/A	1
East Kerry	Piaras Béaslaí	unopposed	N/A	1
East Limerick	Richard Hayes	12,750	77.9	1
East Mayo	Éamon de Valera	8,975	66.5	1
East Tipperary	Pierce McCan	7,487	61.0	1
East Wicklow	Seán Etchingham	5,916	53.9	1
Galway Connemara	Pádraic Ó Máille	11,754	77.1	1
King's County	Patrick McCartan	unopposed	N/A	1
County Leitrim	James Dolan	17,711	85.2	1
Limerick City	Michael Colivet	unopposed	N/A	1
Londonderry City	Eoin MacNeill	7,335	50.7	1
County Longford	Joseph McGuinness	11,122	72.7	1
Mid Antrim	Joseph Connolly	2,791	20.7	2
Mid Armagh	Liam Ó Briain	5,688	40.3	2
Mid Cork	Terence MacSwiney	unopposed	N/A	1
Mid Down	Joseph Robinson	707	6.2	1
Mid Tipperary	Séamus Burke	unopposed	N/A	1
National University of Ireland	Eoin MacNeill	1,644	66.9	1
North Antrim	Patrick McCarry	2,673	21.7	2
North Armagh	Ernest Blythe	2,860	21.8	2
North Cork	Patrick O'Keeffe	unopposed	N/A	1
North Dublin	Frank Lawless	9,138	67.4	1
North Donegal	Joseph O'Doherty	7,003	69.5	1
North East Cork	Thomas Hunter	unopposed	N/A	1
North East Tyrone	Seán Milroy	56	0.3	3
North Fermanagh	Kevin O'Shiel	6,236	47.9	2
North Galway	Bryan Cusack	8,896	69.0	1
North Kerry	James Crowley	unopposed	N/A	1
North Kildare	Domhnall Ua Buachalla	5,979	68.7	1
North Kilkenny	W. T. Cosgrave	unopposed	N/A	1
North Londonderry	Patrick McGilligan	3,951	27.3	2
North Mayo	John Crowley	7,429	80.8	1
North Meath	Liam Mellows	6,982	65.0	1
North Monaghan	Ernest Blythe	6,842	48.7	1
North Roscommon	George Noble Plunkett	unopposed	N/A	1
North Sligo	J. J. Clancy	9,030	68.0	1
North Tipperary	Joseph MacDonagh	unopposed	N/A	1
North West Tyrone	Arthur Griffith	10,442	57.6	1
North Wexford	Roger Sweetman	10,162	58.6	1
Queen's County	Kevin Christopher O'Higgins	13,452	67.5	1
Queen's University Belfast	Seán B. Dolan	118	7.4	2
South Antrim	Kevin O'Shiel	2,318	14.9	2
South Armagh	James Thomas McKee	79	1.8	2
South Cork	Michael Collins	unopposed	N/A	1
South Dublin	George Gavan Duffy	5,133	38.6	1
South Donegal	Peter J. Ward	5,787	54.9	1
South Down	Éamon de Valera	33	0.2	4
South East Cork	Diarmuid Lynch	unopposed	N/A	1
South Fermanagh	Seán O'Mahony	6,673	58.9	1
South Galway	Frank Fahy	10,621	85.9	1
South Kerry	Fionán Lynch	unopposed	N/A	1
South Kildare	Art O'Connor	7,104	82.1	1
South Kilkenny	James O'Mara	8,685	82.4	1
South Londonderry	Louis Joseph Walsh	3,425	20.9	3
South Mayo	William Sears	unopposed	N/A	1
South Meath	Eamonn Duggan	6,371	70.4	1
South Monaghan	Seán MacEntee	7,524	63.0	1
South Roscommon	Harry Boland	10,685	71.6	1
South Sligo	Alexander McCabe	9,113	82.1	1
South Tipperary	P. J. Moloney	8,744	76.4	1
South Tyrone	Denis McCullough	5,437	29.1	2
South Wexford	James Ryan	8,729	51.5	1
Waterford City	Vincent White	4,431	47.4	2
County Westmeath	Laurence Ginnell	12,435	75.4	1
West Cavan	Peter Paul Galligan	unopposed	N/A	1
West Clare	Brian O'Higgins	unopposed	N/A	1
West Cork	Seán Hayes	unopposed	N/A	1
West Donegal	Joseph Sweeney	6,712	62.0	1
West Down	Bernard Campbell	1,725	14.0	2
West Kerry	Austin Stack	unopposed	N/A	1
West Limerick	Cornelius Collins	unopposed	N/A	1
West Mayo	Joseph MacBride	10,195	86.7	1
West Wicklow	Robert Barton	6,239	82.0	1

Cork City was a two-seat constituency, and both Sinn Féin candidate were elected.

=== By-elections, 1918–22 ===
Election	Candidate	Votes	%	Position
1919 North Londonderry by-election	Patrick McGilligan	4,333	30.4	2

=== 1924 general election ===
Constituency	Candidate	Votes	%	Position
Antrim	William McCormick	2,514	2.0	3
Armagh	James McKee	11,756	28.8	2
Belfast North	Hugh Corvin	1,192	3.4	2
Belfast West	Patrick Nash	2,688	5.1	3
Down	Michael Murney	8,941	7.1	3
Fermanagh and Tyrone	Michael McCartan	6,812	6.6	3 (Note: Fermanagh and Tyrone was a 2-seat constituency, with Sinn Féin taking neither seat.)
Fermanagh and Tyrone	Thomas Corrigan	6,685	6.5	4
Londonderry	Charles MacWhinney	5,869	15.8	2

=== 1950 general election ===
Constituency	Candidate	Votes	%	Position
Belfast West	Jimmy Steele	1,482	2.2	3
Londonderry	Hugh McAteer	21,880	37.4	2

McAteer stood as an independent republican candidate.

=== 1955 general election ===
Constituency	Candidate	Votes	%	Position
Armagh	Tomás Óg Mac Curtain	21,363	35.6	2
Belfast East	Liam Mulcahy	3,156	7.3	3
Belfast North	Francis McGlade	4,534	8.5	3
Belfast South	Patrick Kearney	1,679	3.9	3
Belfast West	Eamonn Boyce	8,447	14.4	3
Fermanagh and South Tyrone	Philip Clarke	30,529	50.2	1
Londonderry	Manus Canning	19,640	35.5	2
Mid Ulster	Tom Mitchell	29,737	50.2	1
North Antrim	John Dougan	6,809	14.0	2
North Down	Joseph Campbell	1,637	3.2	2
South Antrim	Michael Traynor	5,155	9.3	2
South Down	Kevin O'Rourke	19,624	34.1	2

=== By-elections, 1955–59 ===
Constituency	Candidate	Votes	%	Position
1955 Mid Ulster by-election	Tom Mitchell	30,392	50.7	1
1956 Mid Ulster by-election	Tom Mitchell	24,124	40.8	2

=== 1959 general election ===
Constituency	Candidate	Votes	%	Position
Armagh	John Lynch	6,823	14.5	2
Belfast East	Barney Boswell	1,204	2.7	3
Belfast North	Francis McGlade	2,156	4.1	3
Belfast South	Brendan O'Reilly	434	1.0	4
Belfast West	Thomas Heenan	4,416	8.3	3
Fermanagh and South Tyrone	James Martin	7,348	18.6	2
Londonderry	Manus Canning	13,872	27.0	2
Mid Ulster	Tom Mitchell	14,170	30.0	2
North Antrim	John Dougan	2,280	5.1	2
North Down	Joseph Campbell	1,039	2.0	2
South Antrim	Michael Traynor	2,745	4.9	2
South Down	Kevin O'Rourke	6,298	14.6	2

=== 1964 general election ===
These Sinn Féin members stood as Independent Republican candidates.

Constituency	Candidate	Votes	%	Position
Armagh	John Lynch	12,432	23.0	2
Belfast East	David McConnell	1,827	4.3	3
Belfast North	Francis McGlade	2,743	5.5	3
Belfast South	Robert McKnight	1,159	3.0	3
Belfast West	Billy McMillen	3,256	6.3	4
Fermanagh and South Tyrone	Aloysius Molloy	14,645	26.9	2
Londonderry	Hugh McAteer	21,123	35.9	2
Mid Ulster	Tom Mitchell	22,180	39.6	2
North Antrim	Seán Caughey	4,424	9.9	2
North Down	Paddy McGrattan	855	1.4	4
South Antrim	Leo Wilson	3,830	5.7	3
South Down	George Mussen	11,031	19.8	3

=== 1966 general election ===
These Sinn Féin members stood as Independent Republican candidates.

Constituency	Candidate	Votes	%	Position
Armagh	Charles McGleenan	13,467	28.0	2
Fermanagh and South Tyrone	Ruairí Ó Brádaigh	10,370	19.1	3
Londonderry	Neil Gillespie	2,860	4.8	3
Mid Ulster	Tom Mitchell	27,168	47.8	2
South Down	George Mussen	8,917	17.4	3

=== By-elections, 1979–83 ===
These Sinn Féin members stood as Anti H-Block candidates.

Election	Candidate	Votes	%	Position
April 1981 Fermanagh and South Tyrone by-election	Bobby Sands	30,493	51.2	1
August 1981 Fermanagh and South Tyrone by-election	Owen Carron	31,278	49.1	1

=== 1983 general election ===
Constituency	Candidate	Votes	%	Position
Belfast East	Denis Donaldson	682	1.8	4
Belfast North	Joe Austin	5,451	12.9	4
Belfast South	Sean McKnight	1,107	3.0	5
Belfast West	Gerry Adams	16,379	36.9	1
East Londonderry	John Davey	7,073	13.8	4
Fermanagh and South Tyrone	Owen Carron	20,954	34.8	2
Foyle	Martin McGuinness	10,607	20.3	3
Lagan Valley	Richard McAuley	1,751	4.3	5
Mid Ulster	Danny Morrison	16,096	29.9	2
Newry and Armagh	Jim McAllister	9,928	20.9	3
North Antrim	Pearse McMahon	2,860	6.5	4
South Antrim	Sean Laverty	1,629	4.2	5
South Down	Patrick Fitzsimmons	4,074	7.9	3
Upper Bann	Brendan Curran	4,110	9.4	4

=== By-elections, 1983–87 ===
Election	Candidate	Votes	%	Position
1986 Fermanagh and South Tyrone by-election	Owen Carron	15,278	27.2	2
1986 Mid Ulster by-election	Danny Morrison	13,998	27.1	2
1986 Newry and Armagh by-election	Jim McAllister	6,609	13.2	3
1986 South Down by-election	Hugh McDowell	2,963	5.7	3

=== 1987 general election ===
Constituency	Candidate	Votes	%	Position
Belfast East	Joe O'Donnell	649	2.0	4
Belfast North	Paddy McManus	5,062	13.8	4
Belfast South	Sean McKnight	1,030	3.2	5
Belfast West	Gerry Adams	16,862	41.1	1
East Londonderry	John Davey	5,464	11.2	3
Fermanagh and South Tyrone	Paul Corrigan	14,623	26.4	2
Foyle	Martin McGuinness	8,707	17.9	3
Lagan Valley	Patrick Rice	2,656	6.4	4
Mid Ulster	Sean Begley	12,449	23.9	3
Newry and Armagh	Jim McAllister	6,173	11.8	3
North Antrim	Sean Regan	2,633	6.4	4
South Antrim	Henry Cushinan	1,592	4.4	4
South Down	Geraldine Ritchie	2,363	4.2	3
Upper Bann	Brendan Curran	3,126	7.4	3

=== By-elections, 1987–92 ===
Constituency	Candidate	Votes	%	Position
1990 Upper Bann by-election	Sheena Campbell	2,033	5.7	3

=== 1992 general election ===
Constituency	Candidate	Votes	%	Position
Belfast East	Joe O'Donnell	679	1.9	5
Belfast North	Paddy McManus	4,693	13.1	3
Belfast South	Sean Hayes	1,123	2.3	5
Belfast West	Gerry Adams	16,826	42.1	2
East Londonderry	Pauline Davey-Kennedy	5,320	10.1	3
Fermanagh and South Tyrone	Francie Molloy	12,604	22.9	3
Foyle	Martin McGuinness	9,149	17.6	3
Lagan Valley	Patrick Rice	3,346	6.8	5
Mid Ulster	Barry McElduff	10,248	18.7	3
Newry and Armagh	Brendan Curran	6,547	12.5	3
North Antrim	James McGarry	1,916	4.2	6
South Antrim	Henry Cushinan	1,220	2.9	4
South Down	Sean Fitzpatrick	1,843	3.0	3
Upper Bann	Brendan Curran	2,777	6.1	3

=== 1997 general election ===
Constituency	Candidate	Votes	%	Position
Belfast East	Dominic Corr	810	2.1	5
Belfast North	Gerry Kelly	8,375	20.2	3
Belfast South	Sean Hayes	2,019	5.1	5
Belfast West	Gerry Adams	25,662	55.9	1
East Antrim	Chrissie McAuley	543	1.6	8
East Londonderry	Malachy O'Kane	3,463	9.0	4
Fermanagh and South Tyrone	Gerry McHugh	11,174	23.1	2
Foyle	Mitchel McLaughlin	11,445	23.9	2
Lagan Valley	Sue Ramsey	1,110	2.5	6
Mid Ulster	Martin McGuinness	20,294	40.1	1
Newry and Armagh	Patrick McNamee	11,218	21.1	3
North Antrim	James McGarry	2,896	6.3	4
South Antrim	Henry Cushinan	2,229	5.5	5
South Down	Mick Murphy	5,127	10.4	3
Strangford	Garret O'Fachtna	503	1.2	6
Upper Bann	Bernadette O'Hagan	5,773	12.1	3
West Tyrone	Pat Doherty	14,280	30.9	3

=== By-elections, 1997–2001 ===
Election	Candidate	Votes	%	Position
South Antrim	Martin Meehan	2,611	8.5	4

=== 2001 general election ===
Constituency	Candidate	Votes	%	Position
Belfast East	Joe O'Donnell	1,237	3.4	5
Belfast North	Gerry Kelly	10,331	25.2	2
Belfast South	Alex Maskey	2,894	7.6	4
Belfast West	Gerry Adams	27,096	66.1	1
East Antrim	Janette Graffan	903	2.5	6
East Londonderry	Francie Brolly	6,221	15.6	4
Fermanagh and South Tyrone	Michelle Gildernew	17,739	34.1	1
Foyle	Mitchel McLaughlin	12,988	26.6	2
Lagan Valley	Paul Butler	2,725	5.9	5
Mid Ulster	Martin McGuinness	25,502	51.1	1
Newry and Armagh	Conor Murphy	17,209	30.9	2
North Antrim	John Kelly	4,822	9.8	4
North Down	Eamonn McConvey	313	0.8	6
South Antrim	Martin Meehan	4,160	9.4	4
South Down	Mick Murphy	10,278	19.7	2
Strangford	Liam Johnston	930	2.2	5
Upper Bann	Dara O'Hagan	10,771	21.1	3
West Tyrone	Pat Doherty	19,814	40.8	1

=== 2005 general election ===
Constituency	Candidate	Votes	%	Position
Belfast East	Deborah Devenny	1,029	3.3	4
Belfast North	Gerry Kelly	8,747	28.6	2
Belfast South	Alex Maskey	2,882	9.0	4
Belfast West	Gerry Adams	24,348	70.5	1
East Antrim	James McKeown	828	2.6	5
East Londonderry	Billy Leonard	5,709	16.1	4
Fermanagh and South Tyrone	Michelle Gildernew	18,638	38.2	1
Foyle	Mitchel McLaughlin	15,162	33.2	2
Lagan Valley	Paul Butler	3,197	7.5	4
Mid Ulster	Martin McGuinness	21,641	47.6	1
Newry and Armagh	Conor Murphy	20,965	41.4	1
North Antrim	Philip McGuigan	7,191	15.7	2
North Down	Janet McCrory	205	0.6	7
South Antrim	Henry Cushinan	4,407	11.6	4
South Down	Caitríona Ruane	12,417	25.8	2
Strangford	Dermot Kennedy	949	2.6	6
Upper Bann	John O'Dowd	9,305	21.0	3
West Tyrone	Pat Doherty	16,910	38.9	1

=== 2010 general election ===
Constituency	Candidate	Votes	%	Position
Belfast East	Niall Ó Donnghaile	817	2.4	5
Belfast North	Gerry Kelly	12,588	34.0	2
Belfast West	Gerry Adams	22,840	71.1	1
East Antrim	Oliver McMullan	2,064	6.8	4
East Londonderry	Cathal Ó hOisín	6,742	19.3	2
Fermanagh and South Tyrone	Michelle Gildernew	21,304	45.5	1
Foyle	Martina Anderson	12,098	31.9	2
Lagan Valley	Paul Butler	1,465	4.0	6
Mid Ulster	Martin McGuinness	21,239	52.0	1
Newry and Armagh	Conor Murphy	18,857	42.0	1
North Antrim	Daithí McKay	5,265	12.4	3
North Down	Vincent Parker	250	0.7	7
South Antrim	Mitchel McLaughlin	4,729	13.9	3
South Down	Caitríona Ruane	12,236	28.7	2
Strangford	Michael Coogan	1,161	3.6	6
Upper Bann	John O'Dowd	10,237	24.7	3
West Tyrone	Pat Doherty	18,050	48.4	1

=== By-elections, 2010–15 ===
Election	Candidate	Votes	%	Position
2011 Belfast West by-election	Paul Maskey	16,211	70.6	1
2013 Mid Ulster by-election	Francie Molloy	17,462	46.9	1

=== 2015 general election ===
Constituency	Candidate	Votes	%	Position
Belfast East	Niall Ó Donnghaile	823	2.1	5
Belfast North	Gerry Kelly	13,770	33.9	2
Belfast South	Máirtín Ó Muilleoir	5,402	13.9	4
Belfast West	Paul Maskey	19,163	54.2	1
East Antrim	Oliver McMullan	2,314	6.9	5
East Londonderry	Caoimhe Archibald	6,859	19.8	2
Fermanagh and South Tyrone	Michelle Gildernew	23,078	45.4	2
Foyle	Gearóid Ó hEára	11,679	31.6	2
Lagan Valley	Jacqui McGeough	1,144	2.9	7
Mid Ulster	Francie Molloy	19,935	48.7	1
Newry and Armagh	Mickey Brady	20,488	41.1	1
North Antrim	Daithí McKay	5,143	12.3	3
North Down	Therese McCartney	273	0.8	10
South Antrim	Declan Kearney	4,699	12.9	3
South Down	Chris Hazzard	12,186	28.5	2
Strangford	Sheila Bailie	876	2.6	8
Upper Bann	Catherine Seeley	11,593	24.6	3
West Tyrone	Pat Doherty	16,805	43.5	1

=== 2017 general election ===
Constituency	Candidate	Votes	%	Position
Belfast East	Mairead O'Donnell	894	2.1	4
Belfast North	John Finucane	19,159	41.7	2
Belfast South	Máirtín Ó Muilleoir	7,143	16.3	4
Belfast West	Paul Maskey	27,107	66.7	1
East Antrim	Oliver McMullan	3,555	9.3	4
East Londonderry	Dermot Nicholl	10,881	26.5	2
Fermanagh and South Tyrone	Michelle Gildernew	25,230	47.2	1
Foyle	Elisha McCallion	18,256	39.7	1
Lagan Valley	Jacqui Russell	1,567	3.5	5
Mid Ulster	Francie Molloy	25,455	54.5	1
Newry and Armagh	Mickey Brady	25,666	47.9	1
North Antrim	Cara McShane	7,878	16.3	2
North Down	Thérèse McCartney	531	1.4	6
South Antrim	Declan Kearney	7,797	18.1	3
South Down	Chris Hazzard	20,328	39.9	1
Strangford	Carole Murphy	1,083	2.8	5
Upper Bann	John O'Dowd	14,325	27.9	2
West Tyrone	Barry McElduff	22,060	50.7	1

=== By-elections, 2017–19 ===
By-election	Candidate	Votes	%	Position
2018 West Tyrone by-election	Órfhlaith Begley	16,346	46.7	1

=== 2019 general election ===
Sinn Féin did not stand candidates in Belfast East, Belfast South or North Down in order to aid anti-Brexit and anti-Democratic Unionist Party candidates in those constituencies.

Constituency	Candidate	Votes	%	Position
Belfast North	John Finucane	23,078	47.1	1
Belfast West	Paul Maskey	20,866	53.8	1
East Antrim	Oliver McMullan	2,120	5.7	4
East Londonderry	Dermot Nicholl	6,128	15.6	3
Fermanagh and South Tyrone	Michelle Gildernew	21,986	43.3	1
Foyle	Elisha McCallion	9,771	20.7	2
Lagan Valley	Gary McCleave	1,098	2.4	5
Mid Ulster	Francie Molloy	20,473	45.9	1
Newry and Armagh	Mickey Brady	20,287	40.0	1
North Antrim	Cara McShane	5,632	12.8	4
South Antrim	Declan Kearney	4,887	11.4	4
South Down	Chris Hazzard	16,137	32.4	1
Strangford	Ryan Carlin	555	1.5	5
Upper Bann	John O'Dowd	12,291	24.6	2
West Tyrone	Órfhlaith Begley	16,544	40.2	1

=== 2024 general election ===
Constituency	Candidate	Votes	%	Position
Belfast North	John Finucane	17,674	43.7	1
Belfast West	Paul Maskey	21,009	52.9	1
East Antrim	Oliver McMullan	2,986	7.5	5
East Londonderry	Kathleen McGuirk	11,327	27.4	2
Fermanagh and South Tyrone	Pat Cullen	24,844	48.6	1
Foyle	Sandra Duffy	11,481	29.9	2
Mid Ulster	Cathal Mallaghan	24,085	53.0	1
Newry and Armagh	Dáire Hughes	22,299	48.5	1
North Antrim	Phillip McGuigan	7,714	18.7	3
South Antrim	Declan Kearney	8,034	18.7	3
South Down	Chris Hazzard	19,698	43.5	1
Strangford	Noel Sands	2,793	7.2	5
Upper Bann	Catherine Nelson	14,236	30.1	2
West Tyrone	Órfhlaith Begley	22,711	52.0	1
