= Mid Ulster by-election =

Mid Ulster by-election may refer to:

- 1955 Mid Ulster by-election
- 1956 Mid Ulster by-election
- 1969 Mid Ulster by-election
- 1986 Mid Ulster by-election
- 2013 Mid Ulster by-election
