= Marian Donnelly =

Irish civil rights and political activist (born 1948)

President of the Workers' Party
- In office 1992–1996
- Preceded by: Proinsias De Rossa
- Succeeded by: Tom French

Personal details
- Born: Marian Devlin; 10 August 1938 (age 87) Castledawson, County Londonderry, Northern Ireland
- Party: Workers' Party (since 1969); Sinn Féin (until 1969)
- Other political affiliations: Northern Ireland Civil Rights Association
- Spouse: Francie Donnelly (m. 1973; died 2023)
- Education: St Mary's College of Education, Belfast
- Occupation: Teacher (1960–78); Part-time teacher

Marian Donnelly (née Devlin; born 10 August 1938) is an Irish political activist who was president of the Workers' Party from 1992 to 1996. She was a member of the former District Policing Partnership for the Magherafelt district of Northern Ireland.

== Life and career ==
Marian Donnelly was born in Castledawson, County Londonderry to Frank Devlin and Margaret Devlin (née Scullion) on 10 August 1938.

She attended St Mary's Convent in Magherafelt.

Donnelly first became involved in political activity in 1955 when she campaigned for the Sinn Féin candidate Tom Mitchell in the Mid Ulster constituency for that years Westminster election, and in the re-run of that election after Mitchell was barred from being a candidate because he was imprisoned in Crumlin Road Gaol for a failed IRA raid in Omagh, County Tyrone at the time.

Donnelly was a founding member and the first Secretary of the South Derry Civil Rights Association, a branch of the Northern Ireland Civil Rights Association. Her husband, Francie Donnelly, was its first chairman and was also a prominent member of the Workers' Party. As a prominent member of the NICRA, she was present at Bloody Sunday in January 1972 when soldiers opened fire at civil rights demonstrators, with 14 ultimately being killed.

She studied at St Mary's College of Education in Belfast and became a teacher, later becoming a part-time teacher.

== Political career ==
She became active in Sinn Féin in the 1960s, and when the organisation split in 1970 she remained with Official Sinn Féin which subsequently became the Workers' Party. She has contested several elections on behalf of the party.

In March 1992, Donnelly was elected as President of the Workers' Party following the breakaway of a parliamentary grouping from the party. She retired from the position in 1996, but remains an active member of the Workers' Party.

She was a candidate for the Workers' Party in the 1992 Irish general election, contesting the Dublin North-East constituency. She received 239 votes (0.60%), and was eliminated on the third count. That years election demonstrated the level of support Democratic Left had taken in its split from the party nationwide, with Pat McCartan outperforming Donnelly by over 3,000 votes.

She and James McLaughlin were both selected as Workers' Party candidates to run in the East Londonderry constituency for the 1996 Northern Ireland Forum election. Both received 75 votes (0.2%) in total.

In 1997, she was the Workers' Party candidate for that years Westminster election, receiving 238 votes (0.47%). She was also chosen as a candidate for the Magherafelt constituency on Magherafelt District Council in the 1997 local elections. She received 37 votes (0.5%), failing to secure a seat on the council.

In December 2018, she delivered the eulogy at the funeral of former leader of the Workers' Party, and veteran Official IRA member, Seán Garland.

== Personal life ==
She married Francie Donnelly in 1973. He died on 26 May 2023.

She has been a member of the Glen GAC Club in her native Derry and is actively involved in the Bracaghreilly and District Community Association.

She and her husband have three adult children.

Party political offices
Preceded by Proinsias De Rossa	President of the Workers' Party; 1992–1996	Succeeded by Tom French
