= 1955 United Kingdom general election in Northern Ireland =

Northern Irish general election

- 26 May 1955

All 12 Northern Ireland seats in the House of Commons
- Turnout: 74.1% (▼5.8 pp)
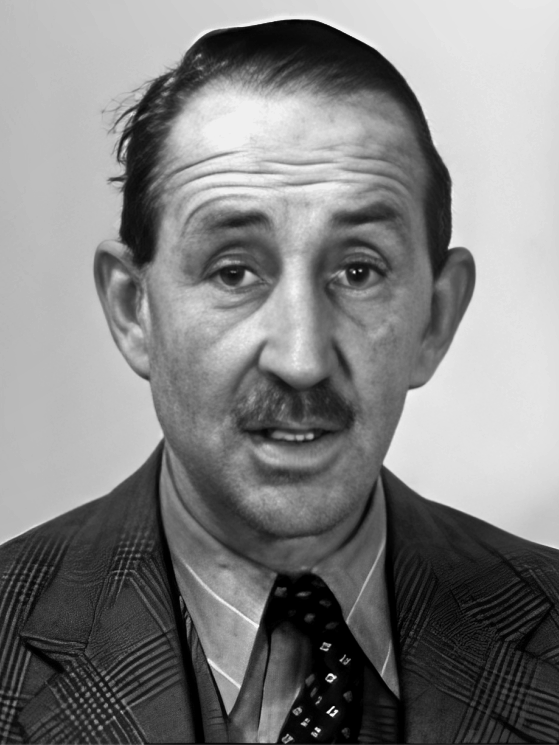
	First party	Second party
		SF
Leader	Sir Basil Brooke, Bt	Paddy McLogan
Party	UUP	Sinn Féin
Alliance	Conservative
Leader since	1943	1954
Leader's seat	Sat in Stormont	Did not stand
Last election	9 seats, 59.4%	Did not contest
Seats won	10	2
Seat change	▲1	▲2
Popular vote	442,647	152,310
Percentage	68.5%	23.6%
Swing	▲9.1 pp	New party

On 26 May 1955, the 1955 United Kingdom general election was held in Northern Ireland, to elect all 630 members of the House of Commons, including the 12 Northern Ireland seats in single-seat constituencies using first-past-the-post.

This was the first election to the House of Commons of the United Kingdom since the creation of Northern Ireland in 1921 where all constituencies in the region were contested

The Ulster Unionists regained the seat which they had lost to Jack Beattie from the Irish Labour Party. The nationalist interest was represented by Sinn Féin who gained the two seats previously held by the Nationalist Party. Patricia McLaughlin was the first woman elected as an MP for a Northern Ireland constituency.

In the election as a whole, the Conservative Party, which included the Ulster Unionists, led by Sir Anthony Eden as Prime Minister, continued in a majority government.

== Candidates ==
Affiliation	Candidates
Ulster Unionist Party	12
Sinn Féin	12
Northern Ireland Labour Party	3
Irish Labour	1
Total	28

== Results ==
Party	Seats					Aggregate Votes		
Party	Total	Gains	Losses	Net	Of all (%)	Total	Of all (%)	Change (%)
UUP	10	1	0	▲1	83.3	442,647	68.5	▲9.1
Sinn Féin	2	Did not stand in 1951		▲2	16.7	152,310	23.6	—N/a
NI Labour	0	0	0	Steady	—	35,614	5.5	▼8.0
Labour	0	0	1	▼1	—	16,050	2.5	▼4.7
Other non-contested	0	—N/a		▼2	—	0	0.0	—N/a
Total	12			0	100.0	646,621	100.0	0.0
Registered voters, and turnout						873,141 (Note: Electorate in contested constituencies, which was all seats at this election.)	79.9	▲2.5

Popular vote
UUP	68.5%
Sinn Féin	23.6%
NI Labour	5.5%
Irish Labour	2.5%

Parliamentary seats
UUP	83.3%
Sinn Féin	16.7%

== MPs elected ==
Constituency	Party	MP
Antrim North	UUP	Phelim O'Neill
Antrim South	UUP	Knox Cunningham
Armagh	UUP	C. W. Armstrong
Belfast East	UUP	Alan McKibbin
Belfast North	UUP	H. Montgomery Hyde
Belfast South	UUP	David Campbell
Belfast West	UUP	Patricia McLaughlin
Down North	UUP	George Currie
Down South	UUP	Lawrence Orr
Fermanagh and South Tyrone	Sinn Féin	Philip Clarke
Londonderry	UUP	Robin Chichester-Clark
Mid Ulster	Sinn Féin	Tom Mitchell

=== By-elections ===
By-election	Date	Incumbent	Party	Winner	Party	Cause
Mid Ulster	11 August 1955 (Note: Tom Mitchell won the most votes at the general election but was disqualified by the House of Commons on the grounds that he was a convicted felon. A by-election was called at which Mitchell again stood and won the most votes. On this occasion an election petition was lodged and Mitchell was again disqualified with the Election Court declaring his opponent Charles Beattie duly elected. It then emerged that Beattie himself was ineligible to sit because he held offices of profit under the Crown. Beattie was indemnified by Parliament against the consequences of sitting and voting while ineligible, and a further writ was moved. In the subsequent by-election, Independent Unionist George Forrest was elected. Forrest later joined the Ulster Unionists and won the seat for the party at the 1959 general election.)	Tom Mitchell	Sinn Féin	Tom Mitchell	Sinn Féin	Disqualification
Mid Ulster	8 May 1956	Charles Beattie	UUP	George Forrest	Ind. Unionist	Disqualification
Belfast East	19 March 1959	Alan McKibbin	UUP	Stanley McMaster	UUP	Death

== See also ==
- 1955 United Kingdom general election in England
- 1955 United Kingdom general election in Scotland
- 1955 United Kingdom general election in Wales
