= Anti-Partition League (disambiguation) =

Anti-Partition League may refer to:

- Unionist Anti-Partition League (1919–22), founded by St John Brodrick, 1st Earl of Midleton
- Anti-Partition League (1938–39), successor to the National League of the North
- Irish Anti-Partition League (1945–58), Northern Ireland nationalist party
- All Ireland Anti-Partition League (1948–50), political organisation based in Northern Ireland

== See also ==
- Partition of Ireland
- Opposition to the partition of India
