= 2013 Mid Ulster by-election =

2013 UK Parliamentary by-election

- 7 March 2013

The Mid Ulster seat in the House of Commons. Triggered by vacation of seat by incumbent
- Registered: 67,192
- Turnout: 55.4%
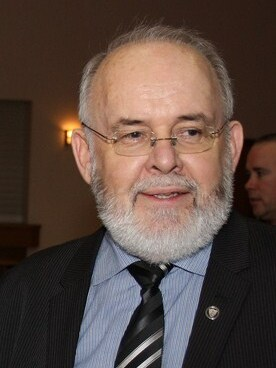

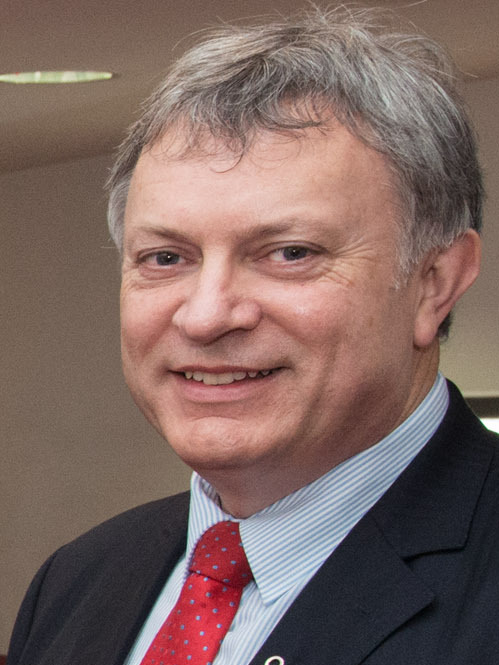
| | First party | Second party | Third party |
|---|---|---|---|
| | | Ind |
| Candidate | Francie Molloy | Nigel Lutton | Patsy McGlone |
| Party | Sinn Féin | Ind. Unionist | SDLP |
| Popular vote | 17,462 | 12,781 | 6,478 |
| Percentage | 46.9% | 34.4% | 17.4% |
| Swing | ▼5.1 pp | New | ▲3.1 pp |
MP before election
Martin McGuinness
Sinn Féin
Subsequent MP
Francie Molloy
Sinn Féin

A by-election for the United Kingdom parliamentary constituency of Mid Ulster was held on 7 March 2013, triggered by the resignation of incumbent Sinn Féin Member of Parliament (MP) Martin McGuinness in order to concentrate on his position as Deputy First Minister of Northern Ireland and avoid so-called "double jobbing". It was won by Francie Molloy, also of Sinn Féin.

== Resignation of the sitting MP - Martin McGuinness ==
On 11 June 2012, the sitting MP Martin McGuinness announced his intention to resign from the House of Commons to concentrate on his position as Deputy First Minister of Northern Ireland and avoid so-called "double jobbing", by which members of the Northern Ireland Assembly sometimes also work as MPs or councillors.

Under the Westminster system, the vacation of a seat by a sitting MP triggers a by-election to choose their successor, with the election date in this case being set by the Secretary of State for Northern Ireland due to Sinn Féin's policy of abstentionism. In reference to the cost incurred by such an election, Sinn Féin said they would have preferred the vacancy be filled by co-option (as used for other elected bodies in Northern Ireland), but this is not permitted in the Westminster system.

Having delayed the announcement in part to avoid a winter election, McGuinness confirmed he had resigned on 30 December 2012, with the formal process of being appointed Crown Steward and Bailiff of the Manor of Northstead occurring on 2 January 2013, a procedural device that Sinn Féin oppose.

== Result ==
Sinn Féin candidate Francie Molloy held the seat. However, the majority was much reduced from the 2010 election. The Sinn Féin vote fell by five percentage points to just under 47%. Also, whereas in 2010 McGuinness was opposed by three unionist parties, the Democratic Unionist Party, Ulster Conservatives and Unionists and Traditional Unionist Voice, none of whom polled more than 15%, on this occasion there was only a single independent Unionist candidate, Nigel Lutton. Lutton took over 34% of the vote, a slight increase on the combined votes of the three unionists in the general election.

2013 Mid Ulster by-election
| Party | Candidate | Votes | % | ±% |
|---|---|---|---|---|
| Sinn Féin | Francie Molloy | 17,462 | 46.9 | −5.1 |
| Ind. Unionist | Nigel Lutton | 12,781 | 34.4 | New |
| SDLP | Patsy McGlone | 6,478 | 17.4 | +3.1 |
| Alliance | Eric Bullick | 487 | 1.3 | +0.3 |
| Majority | | 4,681 | 12.5 | −25.1 |
| Turnout | | 37,208 | 55.7 | −7.5 |
| Registered electors | | 67,192 | | |
| Sinn Féin hold | | Swing | −3.4 | |

^{1}This is compared to the combined vote at the 2010 general election of the Democratic Unionist Party, Ulster Conservatives and Unionists and Traditional Unionist Voice.

== Candidates and the campaign ==
The Statement of Persons Nominated was published on 21 February and confirmed that four candidates would contest the by-election. The result was declared in the early hours of Friday, 8 March.

=== Alliance ===
Alliance chose Eric Bullick.

=== SDLP ===
The Social Democratic and Labour Party (SDLP) chose Patsy McGlone MLA for Mid Ulster, as their candidate.

=== Sinn Féin ===
Sinn Féin's Francie Molloy MLA, then deputy speaker of the Northern Ireland Assembly, was selected as the party's candidate.

=== Unionist unity ===
Nigel Lutton stood as an Independent Unionist, supported by the Democratic Unionist Party (DUP), the Ulster Unionist Party (UUP; who stood at the preceding general election as part of the Conservatives and Unionists), Traditional Unionist Voice (TUV) and others.

The possibility of a unionist 'unity' candidate to maximise the chance of defeating Sinn Féin was raised early on. There were discussions between the DUP and the UUP on standing a unity candidate. The UUP were described as being "coy" on whether or not they would stand or support another unionist candidate. The DUP chair of Magherafelt District Council and TUV leader Jim Allister MLA called for a unity candidate and TUV said they would probably not stand a candidate. The UUP leader Mike Nesbitt said in late January that the party would be willing to support a "community candidate", but that the UUP would stand a candidate if the DUP stood a candidate. However, a meeting of the UUP constituency association was reported to be divided on the issue of whether to support a unity candidate. This came against a backdrop of greater unionist unity in Northern Irish politics more generally, including the setting up of the Unionist Forum and warmer relationships between the DUP and UUP, and the flag protests.

On behalf of the UK Independence Party, David McNarry MLA also supported the idea of a unionist unity candidate in a press release.

The idea of a unionist unity candidate was criticised as "living in the past" by Molloy, the Sinn Féin candidate. Alliance candidate Eric Bullick also criticised the decision.

On 14 February, the UUP and DUP constituency associations both agreed to support victims' campaigner and local undertaker Nigel Lutton as a single unionist candidate. TUV were also supporting Lutton's candidacy, with Walter Millar, the party's constituency chairman and their candidate at the general election, signing Lutton's nomination papers. However, two UUP Members of the Northern Ireland Legislative Assembly, former deputy leader John McCallister and Basil McCrea, resigned from the party in protest at the decision and closer co-operation with the DUP. After the by-election, in June 2013, they announced the formation of NI21, a new unionist party.

Lutton declined to tell reporters which party he usually votes for. He previously worked as a personal assistant for DUP MP David Simpson, to whom he is related, and had before that been a member of the Young Unionists, the youth wing of the UUP. His election agent was UUP General Secretary Colin McCusker, a long-time personal friend. Both DUP and UUP politicians were involved in his campaign.

Willie Frazer, a victims' campaigner, independent unionist and spokesman for the then newly constituted protest alliance the Ulster People's Forum, initially announced his intention to stand. Frazer told a 'webchat' for the Belfast Newsletter that the Ulster People's Forum "is not a political party", and that in usual circumstances he would consider voting for the Traditionalist Unionist Voice. At the end of January 2013, Frazer then said he would consider not standing in favour of Jamie Bryson, a leading figure in the Belfast City Hall flag protests who is the interim chair of the Ulster People's Forum. After Lutton's selection, Frazer initially announced that he would not be running and fully supported him. However, he later said he would still consider standing if Lutton was too close to the DUP. He did not, in the end, submit his candidacy. After the by-election, in April 2013, he co-founded the Protestant Coalition, a new political party.

=== Allegations about the killing of Frederick Lutton ===
Nigel Lutton's father, Frederick, was a former RUC reservist killed by the Provisional Irish Republican Army (PIRA) in 1979. In 2007, under Parliamentary privilege, DUP MP David Simpson (a cousin of Frederick Lutton) alleged that Francie Molloy, then a PIRA volunteer/member, was suspected by the police of being involved in Lutton's death. Simpson also claimed Molloy had become an informer for the British security forces after being caught in "a compromising position" and that he was "well known – and this information is from the police – for a series of sexual indiscretions". Molloy, the claims continued, allowed the police to "break open" the IRA's East Tyrone Brigade. These allegations were denied by Molloy, who has challenged unionists to repeat them outside Parliament, which would allow him to take legal action.

UUP leader Mike Nesbitt has said he was unaware of the allegations against Molloy when he agreed on the choice of Nigel Lutton as candidate. Nigel Lutton stated that his decision to stand was not because of Molloy's candidacy.

== Previous result ==
General election 2010: Mid Ulster
| Party | Candidate | Votes | % | ±% |
|---|---|---|---|---|
| Sinn Féin | Martin McGuinness | 21,239 | 52.0 | +2.4 |
| DUP | Ian McCrea | 5,876 | 14.4 | −9.1 |
| SDLP | Tony Quinn | 5,826 | 14.3 | −3.1 |
| UCU-NF | Sandra Overend | 4,509 | 11.0 | +0.3 |
| TUV | Walter Millar | 2,995 | 7.3 | New |
| Alliance | Ian Butler | 397 | 1.0 | New |
| Majority | | 15,363 | 37.6 | +13.4 |
| Turnout | | 40,842 | 63.2 | −10.0 |
| Registered electors | | 64,594 | | |
| Sinn Féin hold | | Swing | +5.8 | |

^{2}Compared to the Ulster Unionist Party at the previous election.

== See also ==
- 1955 Mid Ulster by-election
- 1956 Mid Ulster by-election
- 1969 Mid Ulster by-election
- 1986 Mid Ulster by-election
- List of United Kingdom by-elections
