= Keith Buchanan =

Politician in Northern Ireland

Keith Buchanan MLA
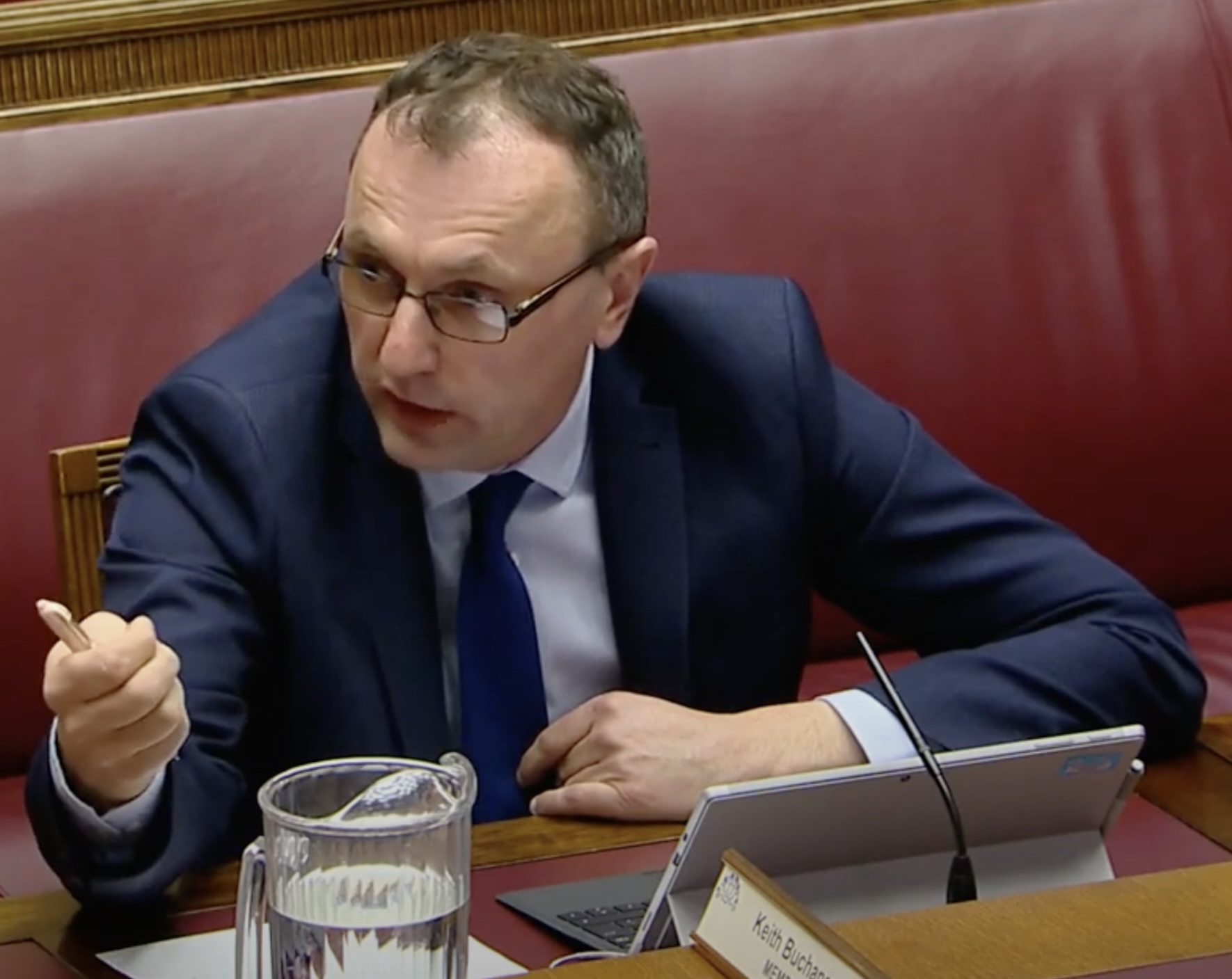
- Buchanan in 2020

Democratic Unionist Party Chief Whip in the Northern Ireland Assembly
- Incumbent
- Assumed office 30 January 2023

Member of the Northern Ireland Assembly for Mid Ulster
- Incumbent
- Assumed office 6 May 2016
- Preceded by: Ian McCrea

Personal details
- Born: 11 May 1973 (age 52) County Tyrone, Northern Ireland
- Party: Democratic Unionist Party
- Spouse: Sandra (m.1998)
- Children: 1

Keith Buchanan (born 11 May 1973) is a Democratic Unionist Party (DUP) politician who has been a Member of the Northern Ireland Assembly (MLA) for Mid Ulster since 2016. He serves as the party's Chief Whip in the Northern Ireland Assembly as well as its spokesperson for Cultural Development and Loyal Order and Groups Engagement.

== Career ==
Buchanan unsuccessfully stood as a Democratic Unionist Party (DUP) candidate at the 2014 Mid Ulster District Council election in the Torrent district.

=== Member of the Northern Ireland Assembly ===
Buchanan later stood at the 2016 Northern Ireland Assembly election, in which he was a candidate for Mid Ulster. He was the last candidate elected in the constituency, unseating incumbent MLA, and Buchanan's running mate, Ian McCrea.

Buchanan was re-elected at the March 2017 Assembly election, taking 9,568 first-preferences (19.3%). Notably, he became the only unionist candidate to be returned in Mid Ulster, following a reduction in the number of MLAs in each constituency, leading to the Ulster Unionists' Sandra Overend losing her seat.

Buchanan contested Mid Ulster at the June 2017 general election, where he came a distant second to Sinn Féin’s Francie Molloy, with 12,565 votes (26.9%).

At the 2019 general election, Buchanan again finished second to Molloy, though his share of the vote dropped by 2.4%.

In November 2021, Buchanan was called "disgraceful" by a fellow MLA for attempting to link the Gaelic Athletic Association to dissident Irish republicans. SDLP MLA Justin McNulty accused Buchanan of "stirring up the pot of sectarian tensions".

At the 2022 Assembly election, he was the fourth candidate returned in Mid Ulster, and received 16.5% of first-preferences.

Buchanan’s share of the vote declined further to 20.2% at the 2024 general election, though still finished as the runner-up in the constituency.

== Personal life ==
He has been married to Sandra Buchanan since 1998 and they have one daughter, Loren (born 2003). He is also an active member of the Church of Ireland.

Northern Ireland Assembly
Preceded by Ian McCrea	MLA for Mid-Ulster; 2016–present	Incumbent
