= Mid Ulster (UK Parliament constituency) =

Parliamentary constituency in the United Kingdom, 1950 onwards

Coordinates: 54.722°N 6.941°W

- County constituency for the House of Commons
- Boundary of Mid Ulster in Northern Ireland
- Major settlements: Magherafelt, Maghera, Cookstown and Coalisland

Current constituency
- Created: 1950
- Member of Parliament: Cathal Mallaghan (Sinn Féin)
- Seats: 1
- Created from: Fermanagh and Tyrone; Londonderry

Mid Ulster is a parliamentary constituency in the UK House of Commons. The current MP is Cathal Mallaghan, of Sinn Féin, who was first elected at the 2024 election.

== Constituency profile ==
The seat covers a rural area to the west of Lough Neagh, including part of the Sperrins. Since 1997, the seat has been nationalist-leaning.

== Boundaries ==
Map of current boundaries

1950–1983: The Urban Districts of Cookstown, Omagh, and Strabane, the Rural Districts of Castlederg, Cookstown, Magherafelt, and Strabane, and that part of the Rural District of Omagh not contained within the constituency of Fermanagh and South Tyrone.

1983–1997: the Cookstown District Council; the Omagh District Council; the Magherafelt District Council wards of Ballymaguigan, Draperstown, and Lecumpher; and the Strabane District Council wards of Castlederg, Clare, Finn, Glenderg, Newtownstewart, Plumbridge, Sion Mills, and Victoria Bridge.

1997–present: the District of Cookstown; the District of Magherafelt; and the Dungannon and South Tyrone Borough Council wards of Altmore, Coalisland North, Coalisland South, Coalisland West and Newmills, Donaghmore, and Washing Bay.

The constituency was created in 1950 when the old two-seat constituency of Fermanagh and Tyrone was abolished as part of the final move to single-member seats. Originally, the seat primarily consisted of the northern, eastern and western parts of County Tyrone, with the south included in Fermanagh and South Tyrone. Of the post-1973 districts, it contained all of Omagh and Cookstown and part of Strabane and Magherafelt.

In boundary changes proposed by a review in 1995, the seat was split in two, with the name retained by the eastern half, even though it contained only 30% of the old seat. The western half became the nucleus of the new West Tyrone constituency. The new Mid Ulster also gained areas from East Londonderry and Fermanagh and South Tyrone, taking it deeper into County Londonderry.

== History ==
For the history of the constituency prior to 1950, see Fermanagh and Tyrone.

Mid Ulster has seen a precarious balance between unionist and Irish nationalist voters, although in recent years the nationalists have advanced significantly to be in a clear majority. Many elections have seen a candidate from one side triumph due to candidates from the other side splitting the vote.

The seat was initially won by the Nationalist Party in 1950 and 1951 then by Sinn Féin in 1955. However the Sinn Féin Member of Parliament (MP) was unseated on petition on the basis that his Irish Republican Army (IRA) convictions made him ineligible, and in subsequent by-elections the seat was won by the Ulster Unionist Party (UUP).

In a by-election in 1969, the seat was won by Bernadette Devlin standing as an independent socialist nationalist on the Unity ticket, which sought to unite nationalist voters behind a single candidate. At the age of 21, Devlin was the youngest person ever elected to the House of Commons in the era of universal suffrage. The by-election saw a 91.5% turnout, a record for any UK by-election.

Devlin held her seat in the 1970 general election but generated controversy when she had a child while unmarried as well as for her fierce anti-clericalism. The Social Democratic and Labour Party (SDLP) stood a candidate against her in the February 1974 general election and the nationalist vote was strongly divided, allowing John Dunlop of the Vanguard Progressive Unionist Party to win with the support of the UUP and the Democratic Unionist Party (DUP).

Dunlop held the seat for the next nine years, though in 1975 he was part of a large section of Vanguard that broke away to form the short-lived United Ulster Unionist Party. He held his seat in 1979 only owing to a unionist pact. He polled poorly in the 1982 Assembly election, taking 2.8% of the vote. Consequently, he did not stand again in 1983, and the following year the UUUP was wound up.

The 1983 general election saw a fierce contest for the seat, with the UUP, DUP, SDLP and Sinn Féin all polling strongly. The winner was the DUP's William McCrea, by a narrow majority of just 78 over Sinn Féin's Danny Morrison. In general elections from then to 2005 the UUP did not contest the seat.

Following the boundary changes, McCrea contested the new Mid Ulster in 1997 but, by then, Sinn Féin had established itself as the most likely party to outpoll a unionist and so drew votes from the SDLP, resulting in Martin McGuinness winning. He held the seat at the general elections of 2001, 2005 and 2010. During the 2001 general election, Mid Ulster had the highest turnout in any constituency in the United Kingdom.

On 11 June 2012, McGuinness announced his intention to resign from the House of Commons to concentrate on his position as Deputy First Minister and avoid so-called 'double jobbing' by which members of the Northern Ireland Assembly also work as councillors or MPs. This necessitated a by-election. On 30 December 2012, Martin McGuinness formally announced he would resign his Westminster seat with immediate effect. Sinn Féin's Francie Molloy won the resulting by-election in March 2013.

== Members of Parliament ==
Election	Member	Party	Notes
1950	Anthony Mulvey	Nationalist	
1951	Michael O'Neill	Independent Nationalist	
1955	Tom Mitchell	Sinn Féin	Disqualified by resolution of the House of Commons, 18 July 1955
1955 by-election	Tom Mitchell	Sinn Féin	Election declared undue on petition; return amended, 25 October 1955
1955	Charles Beattie	Ulster Unionist	Declared duly elected on petition; disqualified by resolution of the House of Commons, 7 February 1956
1956 by-election	George Forrest	Independent Unionist	
1957	George Forrest	Ulster Unionist	Died, 10 December 1968
1969 by-election	Bernadette Devlin	Unity	
October 1970	Bernadette Devlin	Independent Socialist	
Feb 1974	John Dunlop	Vanguard Progressive Unionist	
11 October 1975	John Dunlop	United Ulster Unionist	
1983	William McCrea	Democratic Unionist	
1997	Martin McGuinness	Sinn Féin	
2013 by-election	Francie Molloy	Sinn Féin	
2024	Cathal Mallaghan	Sinn Féin	

== Elections ==
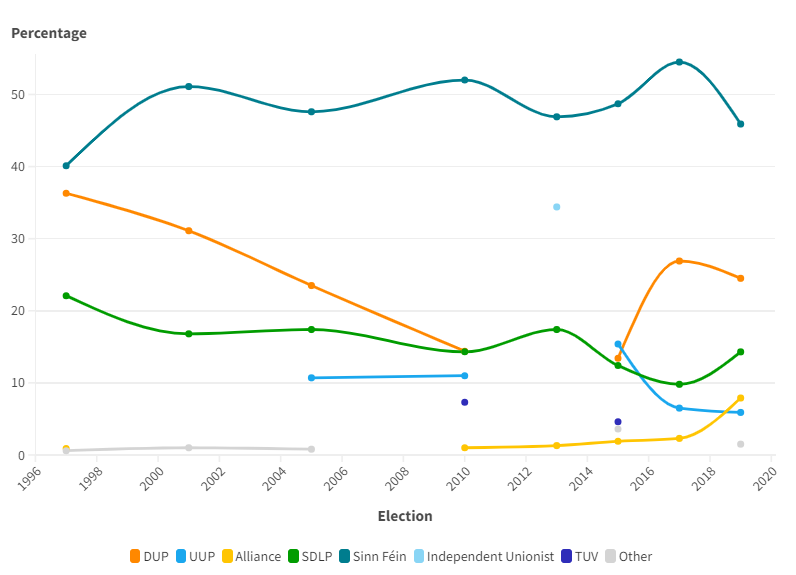

=== Elections in the 2020s ===
2024 general election: Mid Ulster
Party	Candidate	Votes	%	±%
Sinn Féin	Cathal Mallaghan	24,085	53.0	+7.3
DUP	Keith Buchanan	9,162	20.2	−3.5
SDLP	Denise Johnston	3,722	8.2	−5.7
TUV	Glenn Moore	2,978	6.6	New
UUP	Jay Basra	2,269	5.0	−0.9
Alliance	Padraic Farrell	2,001	4.4	−3.2
Aontú	Alixandra Halliday	1,047	2.3	New
Independent	John Kelly	181	0.4	N/A
Majority		14,923	32.8	+11.4
Turnout		45,445	61.4	−1.9
Registered electors		74,000		
Sinn Féin hold		Swing	+5.45	

=== Elections in the 2010s ===
2019 general election: Mid Ulster
Party	Candidate	Votes	%	±%
Sinn Féin	Francie Molloy	20,473	45.9	―8.6
DUP	Keith Buchanan	10,936	24.5	―2.4
SDLP	Denise Johnston	6,384	14.3	+4.5
Alliance	Mel Boyle	3,526	7.9	+5.6
UUP	Neil Richardson	2,611	5.9	―0.6
Independent	Conor Rafferty (Note: Conor Rafferty was a candidate of the Irish Freedom Party, as the party is not registered in Northern Ireland he appeared on the ballot as an independent)	690	1.5	New
Majority		9,537	21.4	―6.2
Turnout		44,620	63.3	―4.9
Registered electors		70,490		
Sinn Féin hold		Swing	―3.1	

2017 general election: Mid Ulster
Party	Candidate	Votes	%	±%
Sinn Féin	Francie Molloy	25,455	54.5	+5.8
DUP	Keith Buchanan	12,565	26.9	+13.5
SDLP	Malachy Quinn	4,563	9.8	―2.6
UUP	Mark Glasgow	3,017	6.5	―8.9
Alliance	Fay Watson	1,094	2.3	+0.4
Majority		12,890	27.6	―7.7
Turnout		46,694	68.2	+7.9
Registered electors		68,485		
Sinn Féin hold		Swing	―3.9	

2015 general election: Mid Ulster
Party	Candidate	Votes	%	±%
Sinn Féin	Francie Molloy	19,935	48.7	―3.3
UUP	Sandra Overend	6,318	15.4	+4.4
DUP	Ian McCrea	5,465	13.4	―1.0
SDLP	Malachy Quinn	5,055	12.4	―1.9
TUV	Gareth Ferguson	1,892	4.6	―2.7
UKIP	Alan Day	863	2.1	New
Alliance	Eric Bullick	778	1.9	+0.9
Workers' Party	Hugh Scullion	496	1.2	New
NI Conservatives	Lucille Nicholson	120	0.3	New
Majority		13,617	33.3	―4.3
Turnout		40,922	60.3	―2.9
Registered electors		67,832		
Sinn Féin hold		Swing	―3.8	

2013 Mid Ulster by-election
Party	Candidate	Votes	%	±%
Sinn Féin	Francie Molloy	17,462	46.9	―5.1
Independent	Nigel Lutton	12,781	34.4	New
SDLP	Patsy McGlone	6,478	17.4	+3.1
Alliance	Eric Bullick	487	1.3	+0.3
Majority		4,681	12.5	―25.1
Turnout		37,208	55.7	―7.5
Registered electors		67,192		
Sinn Féin hold		Swing	―3.4	

2010 general election: Mid Ulster
Party	Candidate	Votes	%	±%
Sinn Féin	Martin McGuinness	21,239	52.0	+2.4
DUP	Ian McCrea	5,876	14.4	―9.1
SDLP	Tony Quinn	5,826	14.3	―3.1
UCU-NF	Sandra Overend	4,509	11.0	+0.3
TUV	Walter Millar	2,995	7.3	New
Alliance	Ian Butler	397	1.0	New
Majority		15,363	37.6	+13.5
Turnout		40,842	63.2	―10.0
Registered electors		64,594		
Sinn Féin hold		Swing	+5.8	

=== Elections in the 2000s ===
2005 general election: Mid Ulster
Party	Candidate	Votes	%	±%
Sinn Féin	Martin McGuinness	21,641	47.6	―3.5
DUP	Ian McCrea	10,665	23.5	―7.6
SDLP	Patsy McGlone	7,922	17.4	+0.6
UUP	Billy Armstrong	4,853	10.7	New
Workers' Party	Francis Donnelly	345	0.8	―0.2
Majority		10,976	24.1	+4.1
Turnout		45,426	73.2	―8.1
Registered electors		62,088		
Sinn Féin hold		Swing	+2.1	

2001 general election: Mid Ulster
Party	Candidate	Votes	%	±%
Sinn Féin	Martin McGuinness	25,502	51.1	+11.0
DUP	Ian McCrea	15,549	31.1	―5.2
SDLP	Eilish Haughey	8,376	16.8	―5.3
Workers' Party	Francie Donnelly	509	1.0	+0.5
Majority		9,953	20.0	+16.2
Turnout		49,936	81.3	―4.5
Registered electors		61,390		
Sinn Féin hold		Swing	+8.1	

=== Elections in the 1990s ===
1997 general election: Mid Ulster
Party	Candidate	Votes	%	±%
Sinn Féin	Martin McGuinness	20,294	40.1	+21.4
DUP	William McCrea	18,411	36.3	―6.0
SDLP	Denis Haughey	11,205	22.1	―8.9
Alliance	Ephrem Bogues	460	0.9	―1.9
Workers' Party	Marian Donnelly	238	0.5	±0.0
Natural Law	Maureen Murray	61	0.1	―0.2
Majority		1,883	3.8	N/A
Turnout		50,669	85.8	+6.5
Registered electors		59,086		
Sinn Féin gain from DUP		Swing	+10.3	

1992 Notional Results: Mid Ulster
Party	Candidate	Votes	%	±%
DUP	William McCrea	19,274	41.0	
SDLP	Denis Haughey	14,360	30.6	
Sinn Féin	Barry McElduff	11,340	24.4	
Alliance	Ann Gormley	1,229	2.6	
Others		779	1.7	
Majority		4,914	10.4	
Turnout		46,982		
DUP hold		Swing		

Between 1992 and 1996 there were significant boundary changes, creating the new seat of West Tyrone. This had a huge knock on effect on Mid Ulster, which lost all its areas in Omagh and Strabane district councils, and gained the Torrent LGD in Dungannon from Fermanagh and South Tyrone, and the parts of Magherafelt District Council previously in East Londonderry. Therefore, the implied 1992 election results are very different from the actual ones and are displayed above.

1992 general election: Mid Ulster
Party	Candidate	Votes	%	±%
DUP	William McCrea	23,181	42.3	−1.9
SDLP	Denis Haughey	16,994	31.0	+4.8
Sinn Féin	Barry McElduff	10,248	18.7	−5.2
Independent	Johnny McLaughlin	1,996	3.6	New
Alliance	Ann Gormley	1,506	2.8	−0.7
Labour and Trade Union	Harry Hutchinson	389	0.7	New
Workers' Party	Tommy Owens	285	0.5	−1.7
Natural Law	James Anderson	164	0.3	New
Majority		6,187	11.3	−6.7
Turnout		54,763	79.2	+1.8
Registered electors		69,138		
DUP hold		Swing		

=== Elections in the 1980s ===
1987 general election: Mid Ulster
Party	Candidate	Votes	%	±%
DUP	William McCrea	23,004	44.2	+14.2
SDLP	Denis Haughey	13,644	26.2	+3.8
Sinn Féin	Sean Begley	12,449	23.9	−6.0
Alliance	Patrick Bogan	1,846	3.5	+0.3
Workers' Party	Paddy McLean	1,133	2.2	+0.8
Majority		9,360	18.0	+17.9
Turnout		52,076	77.4	−6.9
Registered electors		67,256		
DUP hold		Swing		

1986 Mid Ulster by-election
Party	Candidate	Votes	%	±%
DUP	William McCrea	23,695	46.4	+16.4
Sinn Féin	Danny Morrison	13,998	27.1	−2.8
SDLP	Adrian Colton	13,021	25.2	+2.8
Workers' Party	Tommy Owens	691	1.4	0.0
Majority		9,697	19.3	+19.2
Turnout		51,405	77.6	−6.7
Registered electors		66,757		
DUP hold		Swing		

1983 general election: Mid Ulster
Party	Candidate	Votes	%	±%
DUP	William McCrea	16,174	30.0	New
Sinn Féin	Danny Morrison	16,096	29.9	New
SDLP	Denis Haughey	12,044	22.4	−7.0
UUP	William Thompson	7,066	13.1	New
Alliance	Aidan Logan	1,735	3.2	−2.1
Workers' Party	Tommy Owens	766	1.4	New
Majority		78	0.1	N/A
Turnout		53,881	84.3	+3.9
Registered electors		63,831		
DUP gain from UUUP		Swing		

=== Elections in the 1970s ===
1979 general election: Mid Ulster
Party	Candidate	Votes	%	±%
UUUP	John Dunlop	29,249	44.7	−2.7
SDLP	Paddy Duffy	19,266	29.4	−10.7
Irish Independence	Patrick Fahy	12,055	19.9	New
Alliance	Aidan Lagan	3,481	5.3	New
Republican Clubs	Francie Donnelly	1,414	2.2	−10.3
Majority		9,983	15.3	N/A
Turnout		65,465	80.4	+1.4
Registered electors		81,457		
UUUP gain from Vanguard		Swing		

October 1974 general election: Mid Ulster
Party	Candidate	Votes	%	±%
Vanguard	John Dunlop	30,552	47.4	+8.4
SDLP	Ivan Cooper	25,885	40.1	+11.0
Republican Clubs	Francie Donnelly	8,091	12.5	New
Majority		4,667	7.3	−2.6
Turnout		64,528	79.0	−0.3
Registered electors		81,869		
Vanguard hold		Swing		

February 1974 general election: Mid Ulster
Party	Candidate	Votes	%	±%
Vanguard	John Dunlop	26,044	39.0	New
SDLP	Ivan Cooper	19,372	29.1	New
Ind. Socialist	Bernadette McAliskey	16,672	25.0	–28.5
Pro-Assembly Unionist	Neville Thornton	4,633	7.0	N/A
Majority		6,632	9.9	N/A
Turnout		66,681	79.3	−11.6
Registered electors		84,106		
Vanguard gain from Unity		Swing		

1970 general election: Mid Ulster
Party	Candidate	Votes	%	±%
Unity	Bernadette Devlin	37,739	53.5	N/A
UUP	Neville Thornton	31,810	45.1	−7.2
Independent	Michael Cunningham	771	1.1	New
National Socialist	Phelim O'Neill	198	0.3	New
Majority		5,929	8.4	N/A
Turnout		70,518	90.9	+7.0
Registered electors		77,143		
Unity hold		Swing		

=== Elections in the 1960s ===
1969 Mid Ulster by-election
Party	Candidate	Votes	%	±%
Unity	Bernadette Devlin	33,648	53.3	New
UUP	Anna Forrest	29,437	46.7	–5.6
Majority		4,211	6.6	N/A
Turnout		63,085	91.5	+7.6
Registered electors		68,973		
Unity gain from UUP		Swing		

1966 general election: Mid Ulster
Party	Candidate	Votes	%	±%
UUP	George Forrest	29,728	52.3	+0.7
Ind. Republican	Tom Mitchell	27,168	47.8	+8.2
Majority		2,560	4.5	−7.5
Turnout		56,896	83.9	−1.2
Registered electors		67,796		
UUP hold		Swing		

1964 general election: Mid Ulster
Party	Candidate	Votes	%	±%
UUP	George Forrest	29,715	51.6	−18.4
Ind. Republican	Tom Mitchell	22,810	39.6	N/A
NI Labour	Patrick McGarvey	5,053	8.8	New
Majority		6,905	12.0	−28.0
Turnout		57,578	85.1	+14.1
Registered electors		66,607		
UUP hold		Swing		

=== Elections in the 1950s ===
1959 general election: Mid Ulster
Party	Candidate	Votes	%	±%
UUP	George Forrest	33,093	70.0	+20.2
Sinn Féin	Tom Mitchell	14,170	30.0	−20.2
Majority		18,923	40.0	N/A
Turnout		47,263	71.0	−17.6
Registered electors		67,647		
UUP gain from Ind. Unionist		Swing		

1956 Mid Ulster by-election
Party	Candidate	Votes	%	±%
Ind. Unionist	George Forrest	28,605	48.36	New
Sinn Féin	Tom Mitchell	24,124	40.78	−9.92
Anti-Partition	Michael O'Neill	6,421	10.86	New
Majority		4,481	7.58	N/A
Turnout		59,150	88.43	−0.17
Registered electors		66,891		
Ind. Unionist gain from Sinn Féin		Swing		

1955 Mid Ulster by-election
Party	Candidate	Votes	%	±%
Sinn Féin	Tom Mitchell	30,392	50.7	+0.5
UUP	Charles Beattie	29,586	49.3	−0.5
Majority		806	1.4	+1.0
Turnout		66,852	89.7	+1.1
Registered electors		66,847		
Sinn Féin hold		Swing		

The seat was awarded to Beattie on petition on the grounds that Mitchell's conviction as a felon made him ineligible to sit in Parliament. However, Beattie in turn was also found ineligible to sit due to holding an office of profit under the crown, triggering a further by-election.

1955 general election: Mid Ulster
Party	Candidate	Votes	%	±%
Sinn Féin	Tom Mitchell	29,737	50.2	New
UUP	Charles Beattie	29,477	49.8	+2.5
Majority		260	0.4	N/A
Turnout		59,214	88.6	−3.2
Registered electors		66,847		
Sinn Féin gain from Ind. Nationalist		Swing		

Mitchell was subsequently unseated by a resolution of the House of Commons, on the grounds that his terrorist convictions made him ineligible to sit in Parliament.

1951 general election: Mid Ulster
Party	Candidate	Votes	%	±%
Ind. Nationalist	Michael O'Neill	33,097	52.7	New
UUP	John Shearer	29,701	47.3	−0.1
Majority		3,396	5.4	+0.2
Turnout		62,798	91.8	+0.2
Registered electors		68,412		
Ind. Nationalist gain from Nationalist		Swing		

1950 general election: Mid Ulster
Party	Candidate	Votes	%	±%
Nationalist	Anthony Mulvey	33,023	52.6	
UUP	John Shearer	29,721	47.4	
Majority		3,302	5.2	
Turnout		62,744	91.6	
Registered electors		68,535		
Nationalist win (new seat)				

== See also ==
- List of parliamentary constituencies in Northern Ireland
