= Kevin O'Shiel =

Irish politician and civil servant

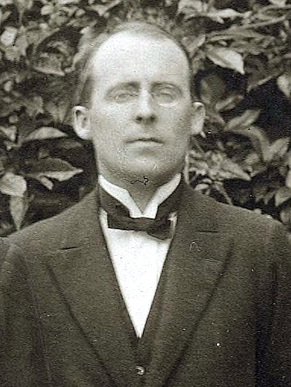
- O'Shiel in 1923

Personal details
- Party: Sinn Féin

Military service
- Branch/service: Irish Volunteers

Kevin Roantree O'Shiel (1891 – 1970) was an Irish politician and civil servant.

Born in Omagh, County Tyrone O'Shiel studied at Mount St Mary's College in Derbyshire, then at Trinity College Dublin and the King's Inns. He qualified as a barrister in 1913, but devoted much of his time to championing Irish Home Rule. He was a member of the Irish Volunteers, but did not take part in the Easter Rising, as he believed that Catholicism was incompatible with taking secret oaths, which would have been necessary to join any of the participating groups. Instead, in 1916, O'Shiel joined the Irish Anti-Partition League, and the following year became a member of Sinn Féin.

O'Shiel was the election agent for Arthur Griffith at the 1918 East Cavan by-election. At the 1918 Irish general election, he himself stood in South Antrim. One of the least promising constituencies in the country for Sinn Féin, he took 14.9% of the votes cast. He was also drafted at the last minute to stand in North Fermanagh; original Sinn Féin nominee George Irvine lost a pan-nationalist nominating convention to an Irish Parliamentary Party candidate and decided that he would therefore withdraw. In the event, his only opponent in North Fermanagh was from the Irish Unionist Party; O'Shiel took 47.9% of the vote, narrowly missing out on election.

Following the Irish War of Independence, O'Shiel was involved in drawing up the Constitution of Ireland and liaised with the League of Nations to successfully negotiating the admission of Ireland. In 1920, he was appointed as a judge in the Dáil land courts; through this, he served on the Land Settlement Commission, and occasionally acted as a circuit judge. He and Conor Maguire were the first two judges to be appointed by the Dáil.

O'Shiel stood unsuccessfully for Sinn Féin in Fermanagh and Tyrone at the 1921 Northern Ireland general election, then afterwards devoted his time to activities in the South. He served as assistant legal advisor to the Irish government in 1922–23, and as director of the North Eastern Boundary Bureau from 1922 to 1925. From 1923, he was a member of the Irish Land Commission, on which he served for forty years.

O'Shiel wrote a number of books, including The Rise of the Irish Nation League in 1916, The Making of a Republic in 1920, The Land Problem in Ireland and its Settlement in 1954, and several Irish Times articles on his experiences in 1966.

His daughter, Eda Sagarra, wrote a biography of her father: Kevin O'Shiel: Northern Nationalist and Irish-State Builder (issued 2013).
