= Gerry Lennon =

Northern Irish politician

James Gerrard Lennon (1907–February 1976), known as Gerry Lennon, was a solicitor and Irish nationalist politician.

Lennon stood unsuccessfully for the National League of the North in South Armagh at the 1933 Northern Ireland general election. In 1944, he was appointed to the Senate of Northern Ireland, serving as a Senator until the body was prorogued in 1972. From 1948 until 1950, he served as a Deputy Speaker.

He was active in the Irish Anti-Partition League, and in 1951 became the Vice President of the Ancient Order of Hibernians (AOH), serving until 1975. From 1962 to 63, he participated in the "Orange and Green" talks with George Clark, Grand Master of the Grand Orange Lodge of Ireland of the Orange Order. The talks did not produce any agreements or actionable results.

In 1965, Lennon became the Nationalist leader in the Senate, and in 1975 he became the President of the AOH. He was also active in the Northern Irish Civil Rights Association, and in July 1969, took part in a sit-down protest in Armagh City Hall.
