= South Armagh (Northern Ireland Parliament constituency) =

Coordinates: 54.198°N 6.488°W

- Former County constituency for the Parliament of Northern Ireland
- South Armagh shown within Northern Ireland

Former constituency
- Created: 1929
- Abolished: 1973
- Election method: First past the post

South Armagh was a constituency of the Parliament of Northern Ireland.

== Boundaries ==
South Armagh was a county constituency comprising the southern part of County Armagh. It was created when the House of Commons (Method of Voting and Redistribution of Seats) Act (Northern Ireland) 1929 introduced first-past-the-post elections throughout Northern Ireland. South Armagh was created by the division of Armagh into four new constituencies. The constituency survived unchanged, returning one Member of Parliament, until the Parliament of Northern Ireland was temporarily suspended in 1972, and then formally abolished in 1973.

The seat was made up from parts of the rural districts of Armagh and Newry, especially Keady. No one knows where Cullyhanna is so it can't be said for sure if it was a part of the constituency.

== Politics ==
The seat had a significant Nationalist majority, but Labour candidates were sometimes polled well.

The remainder of contested elections involved candidates of different Nationalist persuasions.

== Members of Parliament ==
Elected	Name	Party
1929	Joe Connellan	Nationalist
1933	Paddy McLogan	Irish Republican
1938	Paddy Agnew	NI Labour
1945	Malachy Conlon	Nationalist
1950	Charles McGleenan	Anti-Partition
1958	Edward George Richardson	Ind. Nationalist
1958	Edward George Richardson	Nationalist
1969	Paddy O'Hanlon	Ind. Nationalist
1970	Paddy O'Hanlon	SDLP

== Election results ==
General Election 1929: South Armagh
Party	Candidate	Votes	%	±%
Nationalist	Joe Connellan	4,292	53.7	
Ind. Nationalist	Patrick Donnelly	3,694	46.3	
Majority		598	7.4	
Turnout		7,986	48.8	
Nationalist win (new seat)				

General Election 1933: South Armagh
Party	Candidate	Votes	%	±%
Irish Republican	Paddy McLogan	4,803	55.6	New
National League	Gerry Lennon	2,211	25.6	New
Nationalist	Bernard O'Neill	1,627	18.8	−34.9
Majority		2,592	30.0	N/A
Turnout		8,641	51.1	+2.3
Irish Republican gain from Nationalist		Swing		

At the 1938 Northern Ireland general election, Paddy Agnew was elected unopposed.

General Election 1945: South Armagh
Party	Candidate	Votes	%	±%
Nationalist	Malachy Conlon	6,720	61.9	New
NI Labour	Paddy Agnew	4,143	38.1	N/A
Majority		2,577	23.8	N/A
Turnout		10,863	64.6	N/A
Nationalist gain from NI Labour		Swing	N/A	

General Election 1949: South Armagh
Party	Candidate	Votes	%	±%
Nationalist	Malachy Conlon	10,868	76.4	+14.5
UUP	Isaac Hawthorne	3,365	23.6	New
Majority		7,503	52.8	+29.0
Turnout		14,233	84.8	+20.2
Nationalist hold		Swing		

South Armagh by-election, 1950
Party	Candidate	Votes	%	±%
Anti-Partition	Charles McGleenan	5,581	68.6	New
Irish Labour	Seamus MacKearney	2,555	31.4	New
Majority		3,026	37.2	N/A
Turnout		8,136	46.5	−38.3
Anti-Partition gain from Nationalist		Swing		

At the 1953 Northern Ireland general election, Charles McGleenan was elected unopposed.

General Election 1958: South Armagh
Party	Candidate	Votes	%	±%
Ind. Nationalist	Edward George Richardson	3,698	49.5	New
Independent Labour	Malachy Trainor	2,306	30.8	New
Ind. Nationalist	James McParland	1,470	19.7	New
Majority		1,392	18.7	N/A
Turnout		7,474	43.1	N/A
Ind. Nationalist gain from Anti-Partition		Swing	N/A	

General Election 1962: South Armagh
Party	Candidate	Votes	%	±%
Nationalist	Edward George Richardson	8,049	64.4	+14.9
UUP	Brian McRoberts	2,981	23.8	New
Independent Labour	Malachy Trainor	1,470	11.8	−19.0
Majority		5,068	40.6	N/A
Turnout		12,500	73.2	+30.1
Nationalist gain from Ind. Nationalist		Swing		

General Election 1965: South Armagh
Party	Candidate	Votes	%	±%
Nationalist	Edward George Richardson	5,223	88.5	+24.1
Ind. Republican	Peter McSorley	682	13.5	New
Majority		4,541	77.0	+36.4
Turnout		5,905	33.5	−39.7
Nationalist hold		Swing		

General Election 1969: South Armagh
Party	Candidate	Votes	%	±%
Ind. Nationalist	Paddy O'Hanlon	6,442	51.2	New
Nationalist	Edward George Richardson	4,332	34.5	−54.0
NI Labour	Patrick J. Byrne	1,794	14.3	New
Majority		2,110	16.7	N/A
Turnout		12,568	69.3	+35.8
Ind. Nationalist gain from Nationalist		Swing		
