= Neville Thornton =

Northern Irish politician (born 1939/40)

Personal details
- Born: 1939 or 1940
- Party: Unionist Party NI (1974-1981)
- Other political affiliations: Ulster Unionist Party (before 1974)

William Neville John Thornton (born 1939 or 1940), known as Neville Thornton, is a former Northern Irish unionist politician.

== Background ==
Thornton studied at Portora Royal School and Stranmillis College, before becoming a teacher. He also became the vice-president of the Fermanagh Young Unionist Association, and represented Northern Ireland in the Observer Mace debating competition.

At the 1970 general election, Thornton stood for the Ulster Unionist Party (UUP) in Mid Ulster, but was narrowly defeated by Bernadette Devlin. He stood again at the February 1974 general election, in support of the Northern Ireland Assembly, but came bottom of the poll. He became a full-time organiser for the UUP, but, increasingly at odds with the direction of the party, he resigned in 1974 to join the newly founded Unionist Party of Northern Ireland.
