= Michael O'Neill (politician) =

Michael O'Neill (7 October 1909 – 4 October 1976) was an Irish politician in the United Kingdom.

O'Neill was educated at Dromore National School and Bellisle Academy. He was a farmer and a chairman of the Gaelic Athletic Association. He served as a councillor on Tyrone County Council and resigned as a member of Omagh rural council as a protest against the allocation of housing.

O'Neill was elected Member of Parliament for the Mid Ulster constituency in 1951 as an Independent Nationalist, serving in the House of Commons.

He was later associated with the Anti-Partition of Ireland League. He retired at the 1955 general election and the Mid Ulster seat was narrowly won by Tom Mitchell of Sinn Féin. At the 1956 Mid Ulster by-election the League stood O'Neill in an attempt to unseat the abstentionist Mitchell, but this split the nationalist vote and independent Unionist George Forrest was elected.

Parliament of the United Kingdom
Preceded by Anthony Mulvey	Member of Parliament for Mid Ulster; 1951–1955	Succeeded by Tom Mitchell
