= Edward George Richardson =

Edward George Richardson (15 April 1903 – 29 December 1987) was an Irish politician who was a member of the Nationalist Party.

Born in Moybane, near Crossmaglen, Ireland, Richardson worked as a bricklayer and as a farmer, and was an All-Ireland cycling champion. He attempted to become the Nationalist Party candidate in South Armagh at the 1945 Northern Ireland general election. He was defeated at the local party convention. He was subsequently elected to Armagh County Council.

Before the 1958 general election, Richardson announced that he would contest South Armagh. A nationalist convention was held in the constituency, but it decided not to put up a candidate against Richardson. As a result, he was elected, and immediately joined the Nationalist Party group.

From 1965 to 1969, Richardson served as the Shadow Minister for Sport. He was the only Nationalist MP not to shadow an actual Minister.

Parliament of Northern Ireland
Preceded by Charles McGleenan	Member of Parliament for South Armagh; 1958–1969	Succeeded by Paddy O'Hanlon
