= Paddy Agnew (Stormont MP) =

Patrick 'Paddy' Agnew (1878 – 8 September 1959) was a politician in Northern Ireland.

Agnew was brought up a Roman Catholic and held nationalist views. However his politics were also leaning towards labourism, and he had clashes with more conservative Catholic politicians.

He formed the Armagh Employed and Unemployed Association in 1932, and the following year set up a local branch of the Northern Ireland Labour Party. Generally unemployed due to poor health, Agnew organised mental health workers and in 1937 founded the Armagh Federation of Labour.

Agnew was elected unopposed for South Armagh at the 1938 Northern Ireland general election, as the incumbent Republican and the local Nationalist Party both boycotted the election. He won a seat on Armagh County Council in 1939 from Nationalist Senator Thomas McLaughlin.

Agnew lost his Parliamentary seat at the 1945 general election. However, he held his County Council seat, and also won a seat on the newly re-established Armagh City Council, which he held until 1958.

Parliament of Northern Ireland
Preceded by Paddy McLogan	MP for South Armagh; 1938–1945	Succeeded by Malachy Conlon
Political offices
Preceded by Harry Midgley	Leader of the Northern Ireland Labour Party at Stormont; 1938–1942	Succeeded by Jack Beattie
Preceded by Jack Beattie	Leader of the Northern Ireland Labour Party at Stormont; 1943–1945	Succeeded by ?
