= Paddy O'Hanlon =

Northern Irish politician (1944–2009)

Member of the Northern Ireland Assembly for Armagh
- In office 1973–1974

Member of the Northern Ireland Parliament for South Armagh
- In office 1969–1973
- Preceded by: Edward George Richardson

Personal details
- Born: Patrick Michael O'Hanlon; 8 May 1944 Drogheda, County Louth, Ireland
- Died: 7 April 2009 (aged 64) Dublin, Ireland
- Party: Fianna Fáil; SDLP (1970–1980s); Independent Nationalist (until 1970)
- Relations: Rory O'Hanlon (cousin)
- Education: University College Dublin
- Occupation: Barrister

Patrick Michael O'Hanlon (8 May 1944 – 7 April 2009) was an Irish nationalist politician who later became a barrister. Born in Drogheda, County Louth, but resident in Mullaghbawn, South Armagh, since childhood, O'Hanlon attended St Colman's College and at University College Dublin, where he studied law. He worked as a maths teacher, a youth leader and vocational training facilitator. SDLP leader Mark Durkan called O'Hanlon a "real champion of civil rights, justice and reconciliation".

== Political career ==
Prominent in the Northern Ireland Civil Rights Association (NICRA), O'Hanlon was elected at the 1969 Northern Ireland general election as an independent Nationalist MP for South Armagh. In August 1970, he was a founder member of the Social Democratic and Labour Party (SDLP). O'Hanlon was jailed several times in Armagh Jail for advocating civil rights for Catholics and one-man-one-vote.

O'Hanlon's father, also Paddy, had been an active participant in the Irish War of Independence and lost a limb during the original Dungooley Ambush in 1922 during the Irish Civil War. The journalist Toby Harnden erroneously stated that the leg was buried in St Patrick's Cemetery, Dowdallshill. Were it not for the intervention of a nurse who was a member of Cumann na mBan O'Hanlon Snr could have been summarily executed in 1922 in Dundalk. His mother, Sarah, had in fact signed nomination papers to enable Michael Collins to contest the Northern Ireland House of Commons in the Armagh Constituency. The Northern Ireland Office denied their request for redress done to the farm and business in Mullaghbawn after the passage of the Anglo-Irish Treaty as the family were "bitter republicans".

O'Hanlon may have been one of several MPs, including Paddy Devlin and Paddy Kennedy, who met the Irish government of Jack Lynch for military aid. This was denied by fellow SDLP founder member Devlin, though the latter also travelled to Leinster House with O'Hanlon, Paddy Kennedy and others.

O'Hanlon and the other SDLP members withdrew from the Stormont in 1971 over internment. He was later elected to the Northern Ireland Assembly, representing Armagh and was the SDLP chief whip.

O'Hanlon stood for the Westminster constituency of Armagh at the February 1974 general election, taking second place with 29.3% of the votes cast. He stood for the Northern Ireland Constitutional Convention and the 1982 Assembly in Armagh, but on both occasions was narrowly beaten by fellow party member and friend Hugh News.

== Legal career ==
Following this second defeat, O'Hanlon left active politics and qualified as a barrister in 1986; he remained connected with the SDLP but allowed his membership to lapse.

In his self-published autobiography, End of Term Report, he refers to the advice he provided during the Forum talks leading to the Good Friday Agreement negotiations. He advised Frank Feely and Seamus Mallon in the area of policing reform and policing bodies as he was considered a legal expert in this area. Suggested amendments he provided to the texts submitted by the SDLP negotiators are provided in the autobiography, the majority of which were included in the actual text of the final document agreed in the negotiations and voted through by the people in two all-island referendums. O'Hanlon was critical of unionist domination of governmental structures in Northern Ireland and scathing of the lack of progression for nationalists at the top of the civil service.

In 2001 he was appointed by then Minister for Foreign Affairs, Brian Cowen, to chair the Task Force on Policy regarding Emigrants. The report published in 2002, made extensive recommendations about developing relevant cultural and welfare services and was influential in establishing an 'Irish Abroad Unit' and expanding state interactions with the Irish diaspora.

O'Hanlon was junior counsel for the Northern Ireland Civil Rights Association at the Bloody Sunday Inquiry.

== Personal life ==
O'Hanlon was one of five girls and two boys born to Dermot and Margaret (Peg); his father was a butcher. Paddy O'Hanlon was married to Anne Carmel Malley, a clinical medical doctor from Portadown; they had no children. He was a relative of the Cavan-Monaghan Fianna Fáil TD, Dr Rory O'Hanlon, who wrote a foreword to his autobiography, and actor Ardal O'Hanlon. He was also related to Sinn Féin TD Caoimhghín Ó Caoláin. O'Hanlon's autobiography details his struggles with alcoholism until he gave up drink in 1977.

Hanlon died on 7 April 2009 in Dublin's Mater Hospital following a short illness; he was 65 years old. Shortly before his death he became a member of the Crossmaglen branch of Fianna Fáil, which consisted of former SDLP members that wanted Fianna Fáil to run both in the South and the North.

Parliament of Northern Ireland
| Preceded by Edward George Richardson | Member of Parliament for South Armagh; 1969–1973 | Parliament abolished |
Northern Ireland Assembly (1973)
| New assembly | Assembly Member for Armagh; 1973–1974 | Assembly abolished |
