= Charles Beattie =

Member of Parliament for Mid Ulster
- In office 25 October 1955 – 7 February 1956 (disqualified effective 30 November 1955)
- Preceded by: Tom Mitchell
- Succeeded by: George Forrest

Personal details
- Born: 3 August 1899
- Died: 10 March 1958 Tyrone County Hospital, Omagh
- Party: Ulster Unionist
- Spouse: Eileen
- Children: 1 son, 2 daughters
- Occupation: Farmer
- Profession: Auctioneer

Charles Beattie (3 August 1899 – 10 March 1958) was a Northern Irish farmer and auctioneer. Active in the Ulster Farmers' Union and in Unionist associations, he achieved senior office in the Orange Order and the Royal Black Institution and served on Omagh Rural District Council from 1952 until his death. He is principally known for an exceptionally brief career as a Member of the United Kingdom Parliament representing Mid Ulster; he did not win an election, but was declared elected when his opponent was disqualified. However, a few weeks after he took his seat, he was discovered to be holding an "office of profit under the Crown" which disqualified him.

== Working life ==
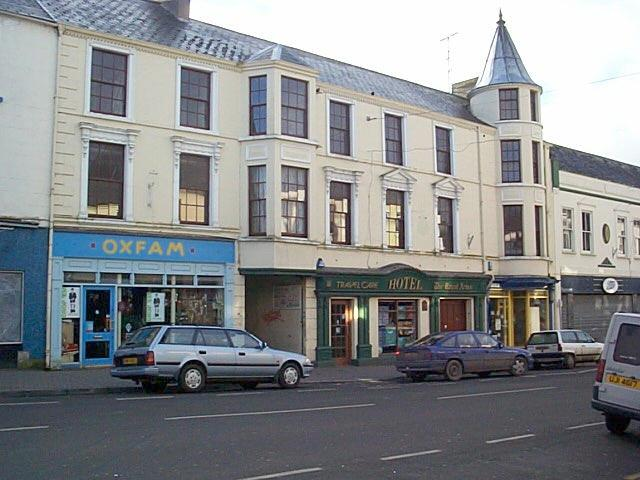
53 High Street, Omagh, photographed in 1999. Beattie's office as an auctioneer was located in this building (where the Travelcare sign can be seen), from the mid-1940s until his death.

Beattie was born on 3 August 1899 and the birth was registered as Charles Beatty In the mid-1950s he was farming a 120-acre (0.49 km^{2}) farm and living at Ashgrove House in Dunbreen, County Tyrone, together with his wife Eileen, one son (Robin) and two daughters (Betty and Pearl). In addition to his farming activity, Beattie went into business as an auctioneer in about 1944, with premises at 53 High Street in Omagh. He advertised the property he was auctioning weekly in local newspapers circulating in County Tyrone, including the Nationalist Ulster Herald.

== Unionism ==
For many years an active member of Unionist associations, Beattie was appointed a representative of Dunmullan on North Tyrone Unionist Association in August 1946. From November 1949 he was a delegate to Mid Ulster Unionist Association; and became a member of the Association's executive committee in June 1950. On his re-election in July 1952, he was also named to the Association's delegation to that year's Conservative Party Conference in Scarborough.

== Farmers' Union ==
As a strong supporter of the Ulster Farmers' Union, Beattie was appointed by the Tyrone County UFU as its representative on the local appeal tribunal under the National Assistance and National Insurance Acts when they were introduced in Northern Ireland in 1946. Self-employed farmers were in a complicated situation with National Insurance and the appeal tribunal often heard their cases; Beattie later stressed that "I thought .. it was the farmers only I was working for". He was paid 3s. 6d. for attending one meeting in 1948, but early in 1949 Beattie informed the Ministry that he would not seek reappointment.

In 1951 Beattie was chosen as Secretary of the Omagh branch of the UFU. In June 1952, he attended a meeting of the County Tyrone Committee of the Ulster Farmers' Union at which he complained that a consignment of potatoes had been sent to Derry and left on the quay for six weeks before the Ministry had rejected them. Beattie's willingness to take up grievances led the UFU to select him to be a new member of its delegation to the Tyrone Committee of Agriculture.

Although he had previously resigned from the National Assistance tribunals, he came under pressure from his friends at the UFU in early 1953 to accept reappointment. He gave in to the pressure and on 9 March was reappointed, receiving with his letter of appointment a document identified as "A/cs.150" which stated "Service on the bodies referred to above is regarded as voluntary and unpaid". He was not to know it, but volunteering for this position would have serious consequences three years later.

== Orange Order ==
Beattie was an active Orangeman. His local lodge was Reaghan L.O.L. No. 304, of which he had served as Master; in addition he became Worshipful Master (W.M.) of Reaghan Royal Black Preceptory No. 1101. At the anniversary service on 6 August 1950, Beattie marshalled the procession of Reaghan R.B.P., while his daughter Ethel played the organ during the service. Representing Reaghan R.B.P., he was one of the platform party at a celebration of the Relief of Derry organised by Castlederg District Royal Black Chapter No. 6 on 25 August 1951; the attendance at the meeting was estimated at over 20,000 which made it one of the largest such gatherings yet seen.

As Grand Treasurer of County Tyrone Grand Orange Lodge, he was one of the platform speakers at the celebration of The Twelfth at Strabane in 1954 where he stressed loyalty to the Prime Minister while saying that 'it was at times not as good as it was when they were under the late Lord Carson'. Beattie went on to deny that there was any split in Orange ranks but to warn that if the Government of Northern Ireland did not act wisely (in the opinion of the Orange Order), the Order 'would know what to do when it came to the next election'.

In October 1954, one of Beattie's warnings to the Northern Ireland government was mentioned by the Irish Nationalist MP Joe Stewart in the Parliament of Northern Ireland. He referred to a newspaper report that Beattie had said "the time had come for them, behind the walls of the Orange lodges, to decide what the future of Ulster would be" and that "It was time the Government realised that they would only have the support of the Orange Order so long as they got what they wanted, and so long as the Government worked for the good of the cause". Stewart took these statements as proof that the Orange Order was running the Northern Ireland government. Beattie was re-elected as County Grand Treasurer on 6 December 1954.

By 1955 he was a member of the Grand Orange Lodge of Ireland, and of the Imperial Grand Black Chapter of the British Commonwealth (normally known as the Royal Black Institution). He served as Deputy Lecturer of the Grand Royal Arch Purple of Ireland, and was District Master of Omagh Black Chapter. He later became Worshipful Master of Omagh District R.B.P. No. 4 and Grand Treasurer of County Tyrone Royal Black Chapter.

== Rural district council ==
On 15 April 1952, the sitting councillor for Dunbreen on Omagh Rural District Council, Joseph Patterson, told a meeting of Unionist electors at Dunmullan Orange Hall that he wished to retire from the council at the forthcoming elections. He nominated Beattie to succeed him, a motion that was passed. Beattie was returned unopposed for Dunbreen District Electoral Division on 6 June 1952. He was not a notably active councillor, but on 4 March 1954 he handed in a petition from farmers in Cappagh, Dunbreen and neighbouring districts, calling for mains electricity supplies.

The next month he defended the achievements of the Ulster Farmers' Union when the closure of Fintona centre for fat stock was announced; Beattie pointed out that there were 28 such centres in Northern Ireland when in an equivalent area in England there were only 8. He was reselected as a candidate for Omagh Rural District Council in April 1955, and was again returned unopposed on 24 May 1955.

== 1955 general election ==
Mid Ulster was represented from the 1951 general election by Michael O'Neill, who ran as an 'Anti-Partition' candidate associated with the Irish Anti-Partition League. However at a Nationalist convention on 8 May 1955, O'Neill's supporters were outnumbered by supporters of Sinn Féin who had picked Tom Mitchell, forcing O'Neill to stand down in his favour. Mitchell was in HM Prison Belfast serving a sentence of ten years' imprisonment after he was caught during an Irish Republican Army raid on Omagh barracks. Although Mitchell as a Sinn Féin candidate did not have access to Nationalist halls to hold meetings, nor to those run by the Roman Catholic Church, he was still regarded as the favourite.

The Mid Ulster Unionist Association had a meeting on 15 April 1955, the day the 1955 general election was announced, but the news had not reached Omagh and so the association did not make any decision about whether to fight the seat. A meeting to select the Unionist candidate was held on Saturday 14 May; among the other names considered were Charles A. Beattie (of Kingarrow), William J. Hamilton, Lt-Col. Alexander, Thomas Lyons (Stormont MP for North Tyrone), and J. P. Duff OBE. Beattie won the selection.

The election was held on 26 May 1955 with nearly one in ten of the votes cast by post. After a recount, Mitchell was declared the winner by 260 votes.

=== After the election ===
With Mitchell in prison serving ten years' imprisonment for treason felony, he was technically ineligible for election and the Unionists began to consider how they could get him disqualified. However they did not present an election petition, and so when the deadline for challenging the election passed early in July 1955, the Home Secretary put down a motion for an investigation into the circumstances of the election.

When Beattie was invited to speak at the unfurling of a new banner for Moree L.O.L. 195 (near Cookstown) at the end of June 1955, he made some remarks about the recently concluded election. He blamed apathy and carelessness in Unionist ranks for his defeat, and said that so-called loyalists who stayed at home playing a neutral part had indirectly supported Sinn Féin. Beattie then insisted that he asked for support not for what he was, but for what he stood for, which he defined as civil and religious liberty for Roman Catholics and Protestants alike. There was said to be an inquest in the Unionist Party into disagreements and apathy and the lack of support given to Beattie.

== By-election ==
When the House of Commons had official confirmation that Mitchell was disqualified, it voted to declare the seat vacant and call a by-election. A Unionist meeting was called for 25 July at the Orange Hall in Omagh to select a candidate; the meeting was presided over by the Duke of Abercorn and the Prime Minister of Northern Ireland Viscount Brookeborough was present. Although there was strong support for the view that no Unionist candidate should stand, the meeting decided after considerable discussion to renominate Beattie.

The campaign was said to have been "remarkably quiet", partly because the polling day (11 August) clashed with the harvest in a rural constituency. Beattie appealed to voters not to disfranchise themselves by returning an abstentionist representative. During the campaign, the Unionists talked up Beattie's chances and claimed that he was winning significant support from Nationalists.

On polling day, Mitchell was declared the winner again, increasing his majority to 806. Asked after the result was known, Beattie blamed his loss on the Nationalists being united against him, and said that thousands of his supporters were away on holiday. To the local press he claimed that Sinn Féin would have had a majority of 4,000 if they had polled their maximum.

=== Election petition ===
The Mid-Ulster Unionist Association immediately decided that they would petition to claim the seat. When it came to trial, Tom Mitchell caused some surprise by deciding to attend the court; however at the end of a three-day hearing, judgment was given for Beattie. He was awarded the seat without a further contest.

== Parliament ==
When he was declared to be the Member of Parliament for Mid-Ulster, Beattie said he had never been to London and had therefore never seen the House of Commons. He was, however, said to have become a familiar personality at Conservative Party conferences after attending several. On 25 October 1955, when the House of Commons assembled after the summer recess and received the report of the judges trying the election petition, Beattie took his seat. The Labour MP Hugh Delargy shouted "The member for Queen's Bench" as he came forward to take the oath.

== Disqualification ==
Beattie had enough time to vote in 19 House of Commons divisions but not to make his maiden speech when on 30 November his membership of appeal tribunals under the Northern Ireland National Insurance Act and the Northern Ireland National Assistance Act, and of the County Tyrone Agricultural Committee, came to light. There had been several similar cases where MPs were discovered to hold disqualifying offices and the initial advice was that these appointments might constitute "offices of profit under the Crown" which would disqualify him from being elected. The following day, Leader of the House of Commons Harry Crookshank moved to refer Beattie to the Select Committee on Elections to investigate. Unionist MPs expressed the hope that Beattie's membership of Parliament would be kept by a special Bill if he was found disqualified, as had been passed in the case of other MPs. When the press asked Beattie about the issue, Beattie said he had "no comment to make"; he was then asked what fee he had received for his membership of the tribunals, and replied that "I have a clear conscience on that".

=== Committee hearing ===
The Select Committee held two hearings to gather evidence from the Attorney-General and from Beattie himself, on 7 and 8 December 1955, and then met again on 13 and 15 December to deliberate and agree a report. The Attorney-General explained the operation of the law and contended that membership of the National Insurance Tribunals was disqualifying; however on investigating the County Agricultural Committees he advised that there was no issue. Beattie told the committee that his place of business was only 500 yards from the Court House where the National Insurance tribunals met and that meetings lasted "no longer than an hour and a half or two hours" so that he was unable to claim for subsistence, as well as being disqualified from receiving money as an employer. He had never attended the tribunal relating to industrial injuries as it had never met and might not even have been constituted, and since his appointment he had not been paid anything in respect of the tribunals he had attended; his last attendance was before his election.

The Select Committee found that Beattie was indeed disqualified by his membership of the three appeal tribunals for which expenses could be paid, and ruled his election invalid. They recommended a Bill be brought in to indemnify him from the consequences of having acted as a Member of Parliament while disqualified (he was potentially liable for fines of £9,500) but found it difficult to determine whether to validate his election and allow him to continue as an MP. By the time he had been nominated as a candidate in the August by-election, three other MPs had been discovered to have held similar offices and a Select Committee had found them to be disqualified. The Select Committee noted that the issue of disqualification was a very prominent issue in the by-election as it was prompted by the disqualification of Mitchell, and it was known that in the event of his return an election petition would be presented to disqualify him again. Therefore, the Committee recommended that no legislation to validate his election and preserve his membership should be brought in.

The news had been given to Beattie on Saturday 17 December; Beattie expected to be invited to attend Parliament when it was formally made public but was not. He was in his auctioneer's office in High Street, Omagh when newspaper reporters told him that he had been disqualified. The Select Committee report was published on Monday 19 December 1955, although the disqualification did not formally come into effect until the House of Commons accepted the Select Committee report, on 7 February 1956.

== Later life ==
Charles Beattie Indemnity Act 1956 (Note: Section 2.)
- Act of Parliament
- Parliament of the United Kingdom
- Long title: An Act to indemnify Charles Beattie, Esquire, from any penal consequences which he may have incurred by sitting and voting as a member of the House of Commons while holding the office or place of member of certain panels constituted in pursuance of the National Insurance (Industrial Injuries) Act (Northern Ireland) 1946, and the National Insurance Act (Northern Ireland) 1946, or of member of an appeal tribunal constituted in pursuance of the National Assistance Act (Northern Ireland) 1948.
- Citation: 4 & 5 Eliz. 2. c. 27
- Territorial extent: United Kingdom

Dates
- Royal assent: 15 March 1956
- Commencement: 15 March 1956 (Note: The Acts of Parliament (Commencement) Act 1793.)
- Repealed: 12 May 1969 (Note: The Representation of the People Act 1969 (Commencement) Order 1969 (SI 1969/630).)
Other legislation
Repealed by	Representation of the People Act 1969
Relates to	National Insurance (Industrial Injuries) Act (Northern Ireland) 1946; National Insurance Act (Northern Ireland) 1946; National Assistance Act (Northern Ireland) 1948

Status: Repealed

Text of statute as originally enacted

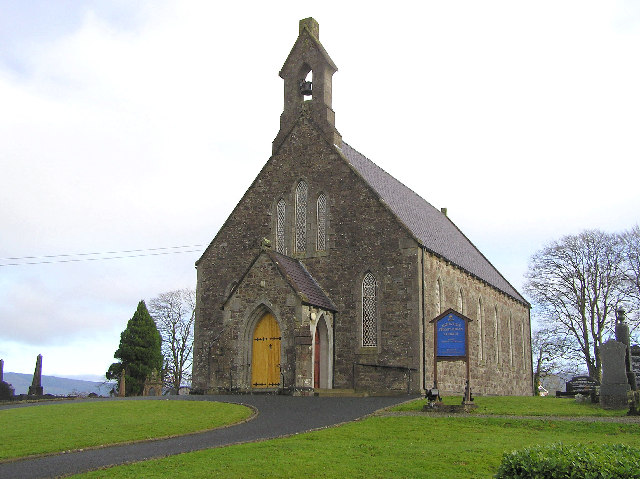
Mountjoy Presbyterian Church, Omagh, where Beattie is buried.

Although Beattie had resigned his appointments after discovering that they were probably disqualifying, the Mid-Ulster Unionist Association decided on 20 January 1956 not to nominate him or any other candidate in the by-election resulting from Beattie's disqualification. The Charles Beattie Indemnity Act 1956 (4 & 5 Eliz. 2. c. 27) received royal assent on 15 March 1956. At the by-election, the former MP Michael O'Neill stood against Tom Mitchell, while George Forrest came forward as an unofficial Unionist. With the Nationalist vote split, Forrest won by 4,481.

Feeling unwell on Saturday 8 March 1958, Beattie had a violent heart attack on Monday 10 March. He received medical attention and was taken to Tyrone County Hospital where he died, being survived by his wife and children. His funeral on 12 March was said to be one of the largest ever witnessed in County Tyrone and the procession included 150 cars; Beattie is buried in Mountjoy Presbyterian Church in Omagh. His son Robin succeeded him as Treasurer of Dunmullan Unionists.

Beattie's comparative obscurity and disappearance after he was disqualified led to little detail about his life being published. In 1981, Michael Stenton and Stephen Lees wrote in a section headed "Advice to Readers" at the beginning of volume IV of "Who's Who of British Members of Parliament" (covering MPs between 1945 and 1979) that "there remains a small band of MPs who are not included in [standard reference works] or whose entries are very brief. What has happened to, for example, Lester Hutchinson, Charles Beattie or Sidney Schofield?"

== See also ==
- List of United Kingdom MPs with the shortest service

== Notes ==
Parliament of the United Kingdom
Preceded by Tom Mitchell	Member of Parliament for Mid Ulster; 25 October 1955 – 7 February 1956 (disqualified effective 30 November 1955)	Succeeded by George Forrest
