= Malachy Conlon =

Irish politician (died 1950)

Malachy Conlon (1913 – 27 March 1950) was a nationalist politician in Ireland.

Conlon strongly believed that there was a need for a membership organisation linking nationalists in Northern Ireland. He pursued this theme during his campaign for the Nationalist Party in South Armagh at the 1945 Northern Ireland general election. During the campaign, which he fought against a Northern Ireland Labour Party incumbent, he stressed the importance of Christianity to Irish identity and contrasted this with what he described as the "flag of the communist Jew".

Following his election, Conlon worked with Eddie McAteer to found the Irish Anti-Partition League in November 1945, and was appointed its full-time Secretary.

Parliament of Northern Ireland
| Preceded by Paddy Agnew | Member of Parliament for South Armagh; 1945 – 1950 | Succeeded by Charles McGleenan |
