= All Ireland Anti-Partition League =

Northern Ireland political organisation

The All Ireland Anti-Partition League was a political organisation based in Northern Ireland. Founded in 1948, it campaigned for a united Ireland in both Northern Ireland and the Republic of Ireland.

The group stood candidates in several elections in the North and the Republic but without success and it was disbanded in October 1950.

== See also ==
- Anti-Partition of Ireland League
- Nationalist Party (Ireland)
