= National League of the North =

Defunct Irish nationalist organisation

The National League of the North (NLN) was an Irish nationalist organisation active in Northern Ireland.

The group was founded in May 1928 on the basis of a radical programme for the "National Unification of Ireland". It was in part an attempt to bring together the supporters of Joe Devlin and Cahir Healy, who were the leading figures in the Nationalist Party.

At the 1933 Northern Ireland general election, in addition to supporting most Nationalist Party candidates, the group stood Gerry Lennon in South Armagh. He was unsuccessful, but did beat the official Nationalist. The League had become inactive by the mid-1930s.

In 1936, Paddy Maxwell founded the Irish Union Association (IUA), aiming to revive the NLN platform. Although it gained the support of most Nationalist Party Members of Parliament, T. J. Campbell and Richard Byrne did not join. The group failed to make an impact, and by early 1937, Healy was suggesting that the group should be allowed to fade away. In October, Maxwell proposed reinvigorating the League by holding an Ard Fheis, but Healy opposed this, and the group was instead allowed to become moribund.

In 1938, the IUA was superseded when Éamon de Valera founded an Anti-Partition League. The group organised a speaker tour of Britain with speakers from Fianna Fáil and the Nationalist Party, including Healy and Anthony Mulvey. However, the Irish Republican Army started their Sabotage Campaign, which hardened British attitudes against the cause of Irish unification, and the project was dropped with the start of World War II.

After the disbanding of the IUA, there was no rank-and-file nationalist group in Northern Ireland until the launch of the Irish Anti-Partition League in 1945.
