= Charles McGleenan =

Charles McGleenan (1895 – 1974) was a farmer, Irish republican volunteer and political candidate.

McGleenan was an Irish Republican Army volunteer during the Irish War of Independence. He was interned at Newbridge Prison, but successfully escaped. He subsequently worked as a farmer of apples.

At the 1935 United Kingdom general election, McGleenan stood in Armagh as an Independent Republican, winning 32.4% of the vote. He joined the Anti-Partition League of Ireland (APL), which was founded in 1945.

In May 1950, the APL conference voted down a motion calling for abstentionism from the Parliament of Northern Ireland. McGleenan had been a supporter of the motion, and when a local convention selected him as their candidate for the South Armagh by-election in 1950, this was in clear opposition to party policy. Despite this, the executive did not intervene, and McGleenan was able to defeat an Irish Labour Party candidate.

McGleenan did not take his seat, but did join with the Nationalist Party MPs Cahir Healy, Joe Connellan and Edward McCullagh in lobbying for admission to the Dáil, as elected representatives of territory it claimed. A motion from Con Lehane proposing this was rejected; later in the year, a more modest proposal by McGleenan to gain a right of audience in the Dáil or the Seanad Éireann was put by Seán MacBride, but also failed.

McGleenan held his seat in an uncontested election in 1953, but stood down at the 1958 general election. At the 1966 general election, McGleenan stood again in Armagh, on this occasion taking 28% of the vote.

Parliament of Northern Ireland
Preceded by Malachy Conlon	Member of Parliament for South Armagh; 1950–1958	Succeeded by Edward George Richardson
