= Ian McCrea =

British politician (born 1976)

The Honourable Ian McCrea
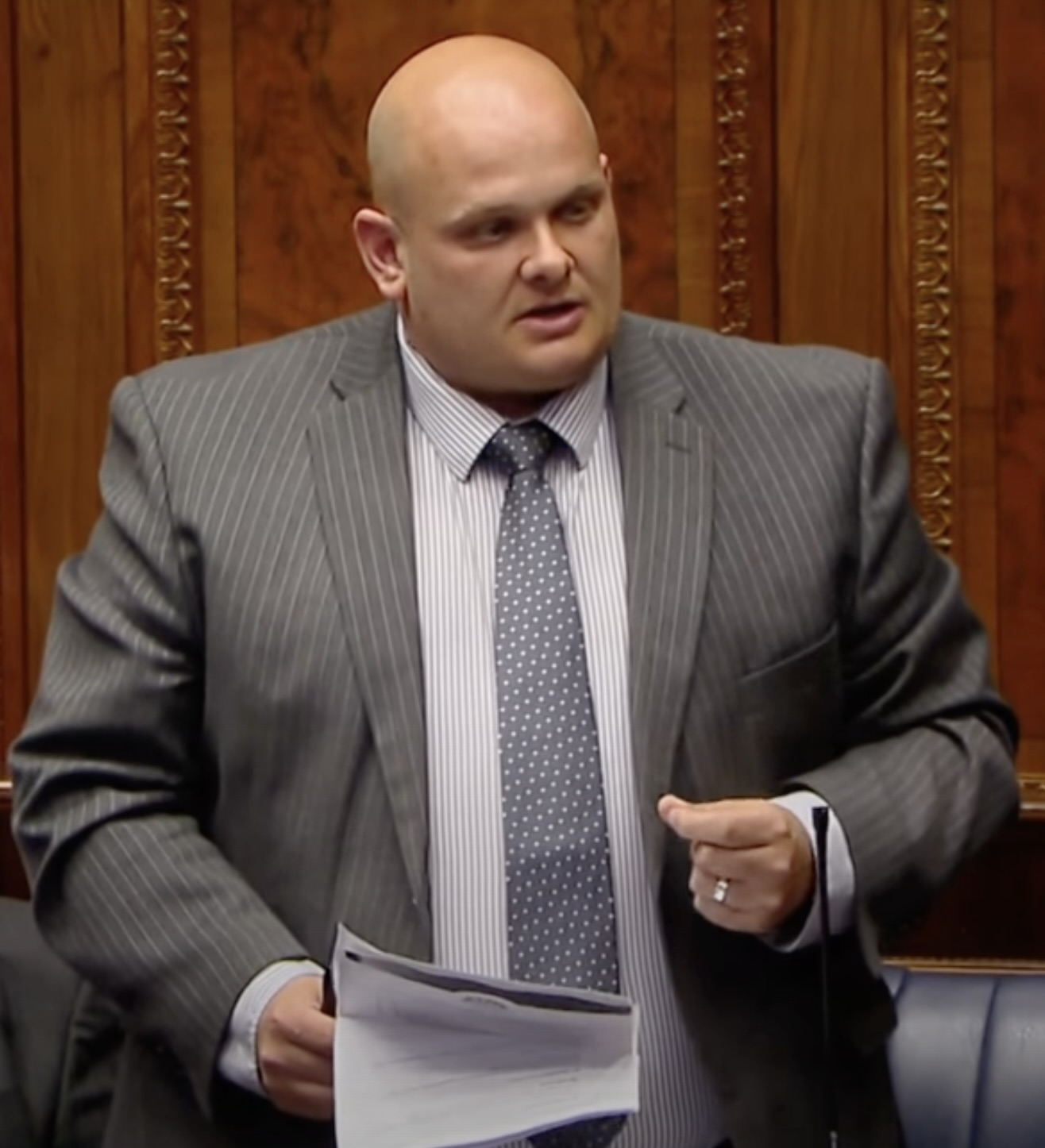
- McCrea in 2015

Member of the Northern Ireland Assembly for Mid-Ulster
- In office 7 March 2007 – 30 March 2016
- Preceded by: William McCrea
- Succeeded by: Keith Buchanan

Member of Cookstown District Council
- In office 7 June 2001 – 22 May 2014
- Preceded by: William Larmour
- Succeeded by: Council abolished
- Constituency: Cookstown Central

Personal details
- Born: 12 June 1976 (age 49) Magherafelt, Northern Ireland
- Party: Democratic Unionist Party
- Website: http://www.ianmccrea.com

Ian McCrea (born 12 June 1976) is a Democratic Unionist Party (DUP) politician who was a Member of the Northern Ireland Assembly (MLA) for Mid Ulster from 2007 to 2016.

== Background ==
McCrea was born in Magherafelt in 1976.

=== Political career ===
McCrea was elected to Cookstown District Council in 2001, held the position of chairman of the Council in 2007–08 and is a member of Cookstown District Policing Partnership.

A former member of the Young Democrats, McCrea is now chairman of the Cookstown DUP Branch, and of the party's Local Government Association, also in Cookstown. A member of the Apprentice Boys of Derry, he also acts as chairman of Coagh United Supporters Club.

In 2011 his car was set alight and destroyed outside his house; no group or individual admitted responsibility for the attack.

McCrea caused controversy by commenting on his Twitter page in 2012 that he would like no GAA county team from his constituency to win any titles that summer, saying, "Great to see Tyrone beat in the Ulster semis today, hope Donegal beat Derry in the final to keep the celebrations out of Mid Ulster."

At the 2016 Assembly election, he lost his seat to running mate, Keith Buchanan. McCrea blamed his defeat on a "campaign of misinformation", following the party's decision to run two candidates in the constituency.

At the 2019 local elections, he ran in Mid Ulster's Torrent District, where he was eliminated on the eight count with 899 first-preference votes.

== Personal life ==
McCrea lives in Cookstown with his children.

He is the son of Lord McCrea of Magherafelt and Cookstown.

Northern Ireland Assembly
Preceded by William McCrea	MLA for Mid-Ulster; 2007–2016	Succeeded by Keith Buchanan
