= 1969 Mid Ulster by-election =

UK parliamentary by-election

← 1966	17 April 1969	1970 →

Constituency of Mid Ulster
- Turnout: 91.5% (▲7.6%)
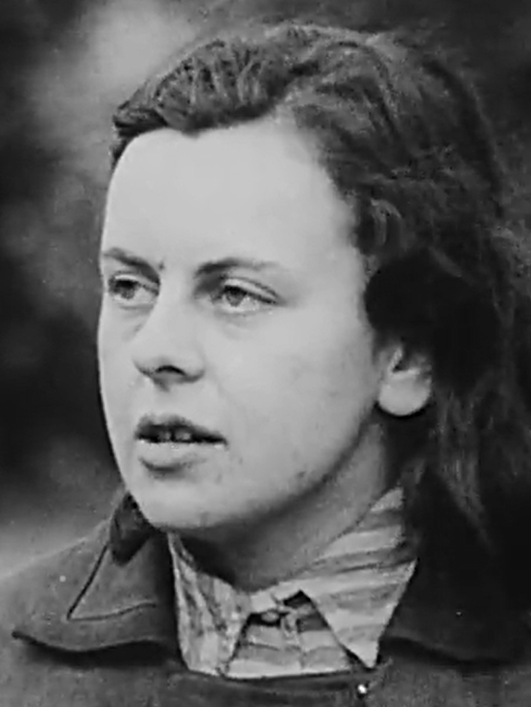
	First party	Second party
		UUP
Candidate	Bernadette McAliskey	Anna Forrest
Party	Unity	UUP
Popular vote	33,648	29,437
Percentage	53.3%	46.7%
Swing	New	▼5.6%
MP before election
George Forrest
UUP
Elected MP
Bernadette McAliskey
Unity

The 1969 Mid Ulster by-election was held on 17 April 1969 following the death of George Forrest, the Ulster Unionist Party Member of Parliament for Mid Ulster. The two-way contest was unusual in featuring two female candidates.

Forrest had held the seat since 1956, initially winning it as an Independent Unionist, but joining the Ulster Unionist Party (UUP) immediately on his election. The seat had been created six years earlier, and during that period had been held by two Nationalist Party members, one Sinn Féin member, and an Ulster Unionist.

At the 1966 general election, Forrest had achieved only a slim majority over former Sinn Féin MP Tom Mitchell, standing as an Independent Republican. It was clear that the balance between nationalist and unionist voters in the constituency was very close.

Since 1966, the political situation in Northern Ireland had changed. The Northern Ireland Civil Rights Association had been formed to campaign for civil rights for nationalists. After its marches were disrupted, leading to the start of The Troubles, more radical groups such as People's Democracy organised. Among its leaders was radical student Bernadette Devlin, who stood against prominent unionist James Chichester-Clark for the South Londonderry seat at the 1969 Northern Ireland general election in February.

Two prominent members of NICRA, Dr Conn McCluskey and his wife Patricia McCluskey, organised a Unity Convention in order to select a single anti-Unionist candidate. After six public meetings between the candidates there were three contenders: Kevin Agnew, a Maghera-based solicitor and member of Sinn Féin, Austin Currie of the Nationalist Party, and Bernadette Devlin of People's Democracy. On 2 April 1969, both Agnew and Currie agreed to withdraw in favour of Devlin. In contrast to Mitchell's abstentionist stance, she committed to attending the British House of Commons to fight her cause. Her uncle, Daniel Devlin, was treasurer of her campaign, Loudon Seth, a Protestant, was her election agent and Eamonn McCann served as press agent.

The Ulster Unionist Party stood Anna Forrest, George Forrest's widow. She did not hold any public meetings or do any electioneering work. In a brief address to electors, she stated "if elected, I will endeavour, with God's help, to strive for a more peaceful and prosperous society where all people can live in harmony and work together for the common good of all."

== Result ==
Devlin achieved a narrow victory, becoming at twenty-one years of age the youngest ever female MP. The election also saw the highest turnout in any Westminster by-election since universal suffrage, with 91.5% of the electorate voting.

Devlin held the seat at the 1970 general election, at which time the Unity movement acquired another MP, Frank McManus, in Fermanagh and South Tyrone. However they both lost their seats at the February 1974 UK general election.

1969 Mid Ulster by-election
Party	Candidate	Votes	%	±%
Unity	Bernadette Devlin	33,648	53.3	New
UUP	Anna Forrest	29,437	46.7	– 5.6
Majority		4,211	6.6	N/A
Turnout		63,085	91.5	+ 7.6
Registered electors		68,973		
Unity gain from UUP		Swing		

== Previous election ==
General election 1966: Mid Ulster
Party	Candidate	Votes	%	±%
UUP	George Forrest	29,728	52.3	+0.7
Ind. Republican	Tom Mitchell	27,168	47.8	+8.2
Majority		2,560	4.5	−7.5
Turnout		56,896	83.9	−1.2
Registered electors		67,796		
UUP hold		Swing		
