= Francie Molloy =

Irish politician (born 1950)

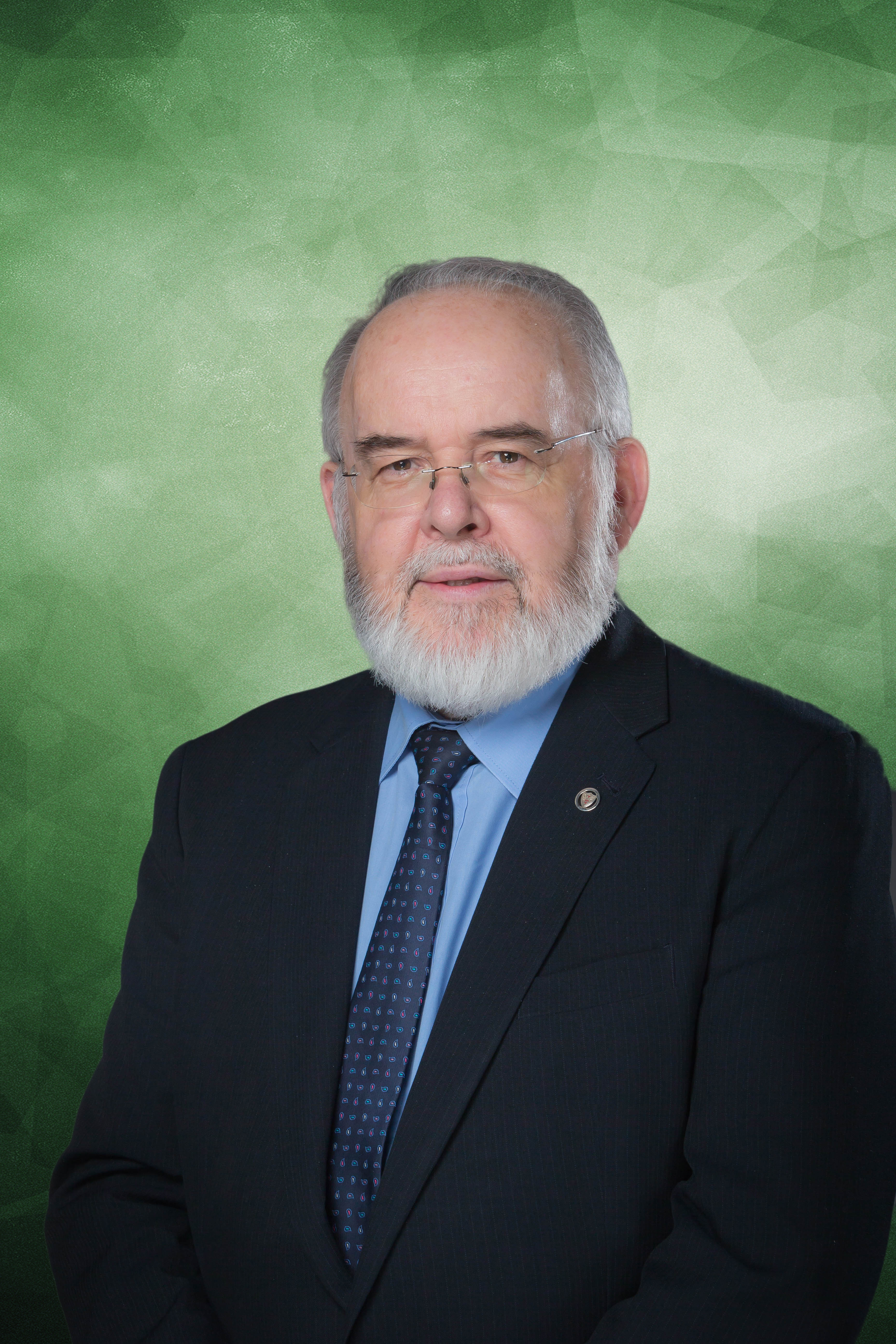
- Official portrait, 2014

Member of Parliament for Mid Ulster
- In office 7 March 2013 – 30 May 2024
- Preceded by: Martin McGuinness
- Succeeded by: Cathal Mallaghan

Principal Deputy Speaker of the Northern Ireland Assembly
- In office 28 June 2011 – 15 April 2013
- Preceded by: Office established
- Succeeded by: Mitchel McLaughlin
- (As Deputy speaker); 7 May 2007 – 28 June 2011
- Preceded by: Himself (Interim)
- Succeeded by: Office abolished
- (Interim Deputy speaker); 11 May 2006 – 30 January 2007
- Preceded by: Jane Morrice (2003)
- Succeeded by: Himself

Member of the Legislative Assembly for Mid Ulster
- In office 25 June 1998 – 8 April 2013
- Preceded by: Office created
- Succeeded by: Ian Milne

Personal details
- Born: Francis Joseph Molloy; 16 December 1950 (age 75) County Tyrone, Northern Ireland
- Party: Sinn Féin
- Website: Official website

Francis Joseph Molloy (Irish: Proinsias Ó Maolmhuaidh; born 16 December 1950) is an Irish Sinn Féin politician who was the abstentionist Member of Parliament (MP) for Mid Ulster from 2013 to 2024. He was a Member of the Northern Ireland Assembly (MLA) for Mid Ulster from 1998 to 2013.

== Background ==
Molloy was born in the outskirts of Dungannon and attended the local secondary modern school there, later becoming an apprentice fitter and welder.

He first stood for Sinn Féin in Fermanagh and South Tyrone in the 1982 Assembly Elections, finishing sixth in the five-seat constituency. He was then elected to Dungannon council in 1985 representing the Torrent electoral area, centred on Coalisland. He retired from the council in 1989 but was re-elected in 1993.

Molloy stood unsuccessfully for Sinn Féin in the 1994 European Parliament election.

Molloy was elected to the Northern Ireland Forum in 1996 representing Mid Ulster and then for the same constituency to the Northern Ireland Assembly in 1998, 2003 and 2007. In 2005, Molloy was temporarily suspended from Sinn Féin after publicly disagreeing with the party policy on eliminating many district councils, including the Dungannon Council of which he was a member.

In December 2012, he was selected as the Sinn Féin candidate for the UK parliamentary constituency of Mid Ulster, which had been held by his party colleague Martin McGuinness since the 1997 general election. The Mid Ulster by-election took place on 7 March 2013, with Molloy winning with 46.9% of the vote.

In the run-up to the by-election, media attention focussed on past allegations about Molloy and how they related to the DUP/UUP-supported independent candidate Nigel Lutton. In 2007, DUP MP David Simpson had claimed during a debate in the Westminster parliament that Molloy had been a member of the IRA and was suspected by police of being involved in the fatal shooting of Lutton's father, Frederick Lutton, on 1 May 1979. The IRA had taken responsibility for it on the basis he was an RUC reservist. The investigation came to nothing, and Simpson claimed this was because Molloy was subsequently coerced into becoming a police informant, providing information that helped break up the IRA's East Tyrone Brigade. Molloy denied the allegations and challenged anyone to repeat them outside Parliament so he could take legal action (the original speech being subject to parliamentary privilege and thus not actionable). UUP leader Mike Nesbitt said he had been unaware of the speech and that it had played no part in Lutton's selection. Lutton denied the claims were behind his decision to stand.

Molloy held his seat at the 2015, 2017 and 2019 general elections. He announced in February 2024 that he would step down at the 2024 general election.

Northern Ireland Forum
New forum	Member for Mid Ulster; 1996–1998	Forum dissolved
Northern Ireland Assembly
New assembly Good Friday Agreement	MLA for Mid Ulster; 1998–2013	Succeeded by Ian Milne
Preceded by Donovan McClelland; Jane Morrice; Jim Wilson	Deputy Speaker; 2007–2011; With: David McClarty 2007–2011; John Dallat 2007–2016	Succeeded by Roy Beggs Jr; John Dallat
New office	Principal Deputy Speaker; 2011–2013	Succeeded by Mitchel McLaughlin
Parliament of the United Kingdom
Preceded by Martin McGuinness	Member of Parliament for Mid Ulster; 2013–2024	Succeeded by Cathal Mallaghan
