= Irish Anti-Partition League =

Northern Ireland political organisation

The Irish Anti-Partition League (APL) was a political organisation based in Northern Ireland which campaigned for a united Ireland from 1945 to 1958. The organisation aimed to unite Irish nationalists, filling the void left by nationalist groups that had become inactive in the decade prior. At its peak, the League had around 3,500 members. There was significant internal debate about whether candidates should participate in the British Parliament. In the mid-1950s, most abstentionists had left the organisation. Dwindling membership meant that by 1956, no candidates were nominated for committee elections. The organisation remained inactive until 1958, when a final meeting was held to distribute remaining funds. The League was succeeded by National Unity in 1959.

== Foundation ==
Prior to the establishment of the League, there had been no rank-and-file organisation of Irish nationalists since the Irish Union Association and Northern Council for Unity had become inactive in the late 1930s. This became a major complaint among supporters of the Nationalist Party, and at the 1945 Northern Ireland general election, some Nationalist candidates – including Eddie McAteer and Malachy Conlon – pledged that if they were elected, they would organise a convention with the intention of uniting all Irish nationalists in one membership organisation.

McAteer and Conlon were both elected, and on 14 November 1945 they presided over a convention in Dungannon. The convention was attended by about 480 people, including all Nationalist Party Members of Parliament (MPs) and Senators. Other anti-partitionist MPs were invited, but Socialist Republican Party MP Harry Diamond refused to attend.

The convention elected a standing committee. Conlon became its first Secretary and James McSparran its first chairman. It also collected more than £1,000 to begin campaigning activities.

== Establishment ==
Divisions appeared in the new organisation almost immediately. The Derry Journal, generally sympathetic to the nationalist cause, attacked two prominent members: T. J. Campbell for resigning as an MP in order to take up a position as a judge, and Cahir Healy for pledging to support the Ulster Unionist Party leadership of the parliament in their campaign to withhold some contributions to the HM Treasury in order to improve housing. A few months later, Thomas Maguire accused McSparran of rejecting a position as a judge solely because it was insufficiently well paid.

Support came from a group of British Labour Party MPs, led by Hugh Delargy, who established the Friends of Ireland group to work with the APL. However, differences between the two remained. In 1946, APL supporter Denis Ireland warned readers of the Belfast nationalist daily, Irish News, that their "friends" in the British Labour Party are "friends of Ireland only in order that the Irish can be turned into good little Socialists like themselves." There was dismay when in the July 1945 election the Friends threw support behind a candidate of the Northern Ireland Labour Party for whom Irish unity was not an issue. In 1947, the APL and FOI did draw up a joint amendment to a Northern Ireland Bill calling for a full discussion on the governance of Northern Ireland.

In 1946, Sean O'Gallagher was appointed as full-time organiser for the League, and by the end of the year, forty local Anti-Partition clubs linked to the League had been established. In July, Gerry Lennon, McAteer and McSparran spoke at a rally in Birmingham in July to launch a British section of the League.

The League held its first annual convention at Dungannon on 11 April 1947 - 146 delegates attended, nominated by 63 branches, and McAteer was elected vice chairman. The following year, it opened an office in Belfast. It faced its first electoral test at the 1948 Armagh by-election, nominating James O'Reilly. O'Reilly failed to gain the Unionist-held seat, but took 40.3% of the vote.

== Relationship with the Republic of Ireland ==
The League organised a rally in Dublin on 25 January 1948, challenging Éamon de Valera to push the British Government on the question of partition. He was soon out of office, and embarked on a world tour speaking in favour of a united Ireland, which the League claimed as a success.

The APL welcomed the passing of the Republic of Ireland Act 1948, and McSparran also welcomed the British response, the Ireland Act 1949, claiming that it proved all British parties were equally hostile to Ireland.

== Debates over abstentionism ==
A general election in Northern Ireland was called for 1949, and the League organised selection conventions for each constituency where there was a chance of an anti-partitionist victory.

The selections were marked by fierce debate over whether the candidates should pledge to attend the Parliament, or to boycott it. The election was only moderately successful for the League. All the seats held by Nationalist MPs immediately before the election were again won by them.

Frustrated with the hostility of much of the British Labour Party, the League's British section stood four candidates against Labour MPs in the 1950 general election, in Bootle, Coatbridge and Airdrie, Greenock and Glasgow Gorbals, all areas with large Irish populations. Despite the intervention, Labour held all four seats.

In May 1950, the APL conference voted down a motion calling for abstentionism. Conlon died soon afterwards, creating a by-election in his seat of South Armagh. The Irish Labour Party nominated Seamus McKearney. The League asked him to withdraw, but his agent, Harry Diamond, was an old opponent of the organisation and rejected the request.

A local convention was held, which nominated Charles McGleenan, a prominent supporter of the failed motion. This was in clear opposition to party policy. Despite this, the executive did not intervene, and McGleenan was able to easily defeat an Irish Labour Party candidate. McGleenan did not take his seat, declaring his allegiance was only to the Republic of Ireland, but he campaigned alongside the Nationalist MPs and remained active in the League.

== Decline ==
By 1951, the League was in decline. It was short of funds, and there was reduced attendance at its meetings. The British section was also struggling, and motions to its conference called for it to prioritise recruitment and propaganda over attacks on other parties. It stood only one candidate at the 1951 general election.

The party organised a march through Derry on St Patrick's Day 1951, displaying the flag of the Republic of Ireland. The Royal Ulster Constabulary (RUC) attempted to seize the flag, and several League members were arrested. A repeat was organised a year later, with a far larger turnout. This time, the RUC used violence to break up the march.

Conventions were again organised to select candidates for the 1953 Northern Ireland general election. McAteer was selected for Foyle in place of Paddy Maxwell, who had abstentionist tendencies. Most constituencies chose MPs who pledged to attend the Parliament, but McGleenan was again selected in South Armagh, and delegates in Mid Tyrone chose Liam Kelly, a jailed republican. Sitting Nationalist MP Edward McCullagh stood against Kelly, in defiance of the convention, but was narrowly defeated. Kelly was associated with the Irish Republican party Clann na Poblachta and was later appointed to the Irish Senate (Seanad Éireann). In Mid Londonderry, Nationalist Paddy Gormley beat the APL candidate. Gormley declared that the APL was now felt to be discredited.

Despite the success of Kelly and McGleenan at the election, most of the abstentionists left the League. The executive was reorganised, McAteer becoming chairman, McSparran President, and Paddy McGill was appointed as the new Secretary.

At the 1956 Mid Ulster by-election, the League stood Michael O'Neill in an attempt to unseat abstentionist MP Tom Mitchell, but this split the nationalist vote and independent Unionist George Forrest was elected.

In late 1956, the committee announced their intention to resign. No candidates were nominated to replace them, and the League became moribund. Some local clubs became branches of the Nationalist Party, while the remnants of the British section became the United Irish Association. Frank Traynor became the Acting Secretary of the League, and he organised a final meeting in Belfast on 2 December 1958. McGill ordered McAteer to closely watch the meeting to ensure that it did not discuss policy, worrying that Traynor would try to cause trouble for the Nationalist Party. The meeting wound up the organisation and distributed its funds.

In 1959, National Unity was founded by former APL members who called for the Nationalist Party to take a new, more active approach.

== See also ==
- All Ireland Anti-Partition League
