= Tom Mitchell (Irish politician) =

Irish politician (1931–2020)

Member of Parliament for Mid Ulster
- In office 11 August 1955 – 7 October 1955
- Preceded by: Michael O'Neill
- Succeeded by: Himself
- In office 26 May 1955 – 18 July 1955
- Preceded by: Vacant (Himself)
- Succeeded by: Charles Beattie

Personal details
- Born: 29 July 1931 Dublin, Ireland
- Died: 22 July 2020 (aged 88)
- Party: Independent Republican (after 1959); Sinn Féin
- Military career
- Allegiance: Ireland
- Branch: Irish Republican Army

Thomas James Mitchell (29 July 1931 – 22 July 2020) was an Irish republican. He was active in the Irish Republican Army and took part in a raid on Omagh barracks in 1954, being captured and imprisoned. While in jail he was twice elected as a Member of the United Kingdom Parliament, but was disqualified and his elections overturned.

== Omagh raid ==
Mitchell was born in Dublin on 29 July 1931, and was working there as a bricklayer in 1954. He took part in an unsuccessful IRA raid on a British Army barracks in Omagh, County Tyrone in October 1954, and as a result received a sentence of 10 years imprisonment for treason felony.

== General election ==
While serving his sentence in Crumlin Road prison, Mitchell was nominated as a Sinn Féin candidate on an abstentionist platform for the Mid-Ulster constituency in the May 1955 UK general election. Mitchell got 29,737 votes, winning the election with a majority of 260. The 1955 elections were historic for Sinn Féin as it was the first time that the party had contested all constituencies in Northern Ireland since 1921, and the first time since 1918 that any Sinn Féin candidates had been elected for Northern Ireland constituencies in the British House of Commons.

The Forfeiture Act 1870 provided that anyone convicted of treason or felony and sentenced to a term of imprisonment exceeding 12 months was incapable of being elected to or sitting in the House of Commons. On 18 July 1955 a resolution of the House of Commons, passed by 197 votes to 63, formally declared that Mitchell was covered by this provision, vacated his seat, and ordered that a by-election be held. The ensuing by-election was held on 11 August. Mitchell once again stood as a candidate, facing the same Ulster Unionist Party opponent as in the general election. He won the election with an increased vote and a majority of 806.

== Election petition trial ==
On this occasion, his defeated opponent Charles Beattie lodged an election petition, claiming to have won on the basis that voters knew Mitchell to be disqualified and incapable of election and so had thrown away their votes. Mitchell decided to attend the election court in person without legal representation, tackling the deputy governor of the prison over his refusal to allow an election address to be sent out; the deputy governor explained that instructions from the Ministry of Home Affairs prevented it. Mitchell made a lengthy address to the court on the second day, asserting that the people of Mid-Ulster were being put on trial and were about to be disfranchised. As Mitchell knew was inevitable, the court declared that he was not duly elected, and awarded the seat to Beattie.

== Defeat ==
The following year, Beattie was himself disqualified from Parliament, as he held appointments which were legally "offices of profit under the crown"; while an Act of Parliament could theoretically have validated his election, the Select Committee found it would be inappropriate given that the issue of qualification to be elected had been prominent in the by-election. A new by-election had to be held in the constituency, and Mitchell was again chosen as the Sinn Féin candidate. On this occasion Mitchell was also opposed by the former MP for the seat, Michael O'Neill who was sponsored by the Irish Anti-Partition League. Mitchell and O'Neill split the nationalist vote and he was defeated at the polls on 8 May 1956 by George Forrest, who stood as an Independent Unionist candidate.

== Dáil elections ==
He stood for unsuccessfully for election to the Dáil, in Dublin North-East in 1957 and 1961 general elections for Sinn Féin, using the Irish version of his name, Tomás Misteil.

== Later life ==
Running under the Independent Republican banner, Mitchell unsuccessfully attempted to retake the seat at the three subsequent general elections in 1959, 1964 and 1966. In the 1969 Mid-Ulster by-election he supported and canvassed for Bernadette Devlin. Mitchell sided with Official Sinn Féin in the Official/Provisional split in the republican movement.

In 2006, Mitchell delivered an oration at the funeral of veteran IRA member, Frank Morris.

Mitchell died on 22 July 2020, shortly before his 89th birthday.

== See also ==
- List of United Kingdom MPs with the shortest service

Parliament of the United Kingdom
Preceded by Michael O'Neill	Member of Parliament for Mid Ulster; 26 May 1955–18 July 1955	Disqualified
Vacant	Member of Parliament for Mid Ulster; 11 August 1955–7 October 1955	Succeeded by Charles Beattie
