= George Forrest (Northern Ireland politician) =

Northern Irish unionist politician

Member of Parliament for Mid Ulster
- In office 8 May 1956 – 10 December 1968
- Preceded by: Charles Beattie
- Succeeded by: Bernadette Devlin

Personal details
- Born: 26 October 1921 Cookstown, Northern Ireland
- Died: 10 December 1968 (aged 47) Belfast Hospital
- Party: Ulster Unionist
- Other political affiliations: Independent Unionist (1956)

George Forrest (26 October 1921 – 10 December 1968) was a Northern Irish unionist politician from Tullyhogue Cookstown who served as MP for Mid Ulster in the House of Commons from 1956 until his death. One of twelve children of Joseph and Sarah-Jane Forrest, George Forrest was an auctioneer and publican prior to his election to parliament.

== Political career ==
Forrest was first elected at the age of 33 in the 1956 Mid Ulster by-election, which was called after two previous Mid-Ulster MPs, Unionist Charles Beattie and Republican Tom Mitchell, had been declared ineligible to sit. Initially elected as an Independent Unionist, Forrest soon joined the Ulster Unionist Party and successfully re-contested the seat at general elections in 1959, 1964 and 1966.

Forrest's maiden speech in 1958 was to introduce a private members' bill, the Merchant Shipping (Liability of Shipowners and Others) Bill 1958, to reduce limitations on a shipowner's liability for damages for loss of life or personal injury. An amended version of the Bill was enacted the same year. In 1964 Forrest introduced the Adoption Act 1964 to align adoption laws in Northern Ireland, the Isle of Man, with Great Britain.

Forrest was a prominent supporter of Prime Minister of Northern Ireland Terence O'Neill's liberal policies and became reviled by many of O'Neill's opponents. In 1967 he was pulled off a Twelfth of July platform in Coagh and kicked unconscious by fellow members of the Orange Order who objected to his support for O'Neill.

== Death and by-election ==
In 1965 Forrest underwent major brain surgery, but he never fully recovered and died in 1968 at the age of 47. He was survived by his wife Anna Forrest, daughters Noreen and Ethne, and son Richard. Terence O'Neill said of Forrest that, "He was a generous and loyal man and brought a down to earth quality of integrity into his career in politics."

The Ulster Unionists selected Forrest's widow Anna as their candidate for the 1969 Mid-Ulster by-election, however she held no public meetings or did any electioneering beyond a brief address to voters. The election was won by civil rights activist Bernadette Devlin.

Parliament of the United Kingdom
Preceded by Charles Beattie	Member of Parliament for Mid Ulster; 1956–1968	Succeeded by Bernadette Devlin
