= 1955 Mid Ulster by-election =

UK parliamentary by-election

- 11 August 1955

Mid Ulster constituency
- Turnout: 66,852; 89.7 (▲1.1 pp)
Candidate	Tom Mitchell	Charles Beattie
Party	Sinn Féin	UUP
Popular vote	30,392	29,586
Percentage	50.7%	49.3%
MP before election
Tom Mitchell
Sinn Féin
Elected MP
Tom Mitchell (Election results annulled)

The by-election held in Mid Ulster on 11 August 1955 was called as a result of a vote in the British parliament on 18 July 1955 which voted 197 votes to 63 to nullify the result of the 1955 general election in the constituency. Mitchell won again but lost the seat to Charles Beattie after an election petition, with Beattie also being disqualified shortly after for holding an office of profit. This led to the 1956 Mid Ulster by-election.

== Background ==
At the 1955 United Kingdom general election, Tom Mitchell won the Mid Ulster constituency. In July 1955, the Attorney General for Northern Ireland moved a motion in the House of Commons to nullify Mitchell's election on the grounds that he was a convicted felon and had been sentenced to a 10 year prison sentence. Accordingly, this made Mitchell ineligible to be a Member of Parliament (MP) under the Forfeiture Act 1870. The House voted 197 to 63 in favour to nullify the election and declare the Mid Ulster seat vacant.

== Result ==
1955 Mid Ulster by-election
Party	Candidate	Votes	%	±%
Sinn Féin	Tom Mitchell	30,392	50.7	+0.5
UUP	Charles Beattie	29,586	49.3	−0.5
Margin of victory		806	1.4	+1.0
Turnout		66,852	89.7	+1.1
Registered electors		66,847		
Void election result		Swing	N/A	

== Aftermath ==
In the by-election, Mitchell managed to retain the seat with an increase in the number of votes. In the aftermath of the election, the defeated Unionist candidate successfully lodged a petition to have Mitchell, a convicted felon, removed as MP again. The seat was subsequently given to Charles Beattie with the votes for Mitchell being treated as being "thrown away". However, it later emerged that at the time of the election, Beattie was a member of an appeals tribunal, considered an "office of profit under the Crown"; the House of Commons subsequently voted without a division in favour of the Attorney-General's motion that this disqualified him from the office of MP and vacated the seat. As a result, another by-election was called in 1956.
