= 1956 Mid Ulster by-election =

UK parliamentary by-election

- 8 May 1956

Mid Ulster constituency
- Registered: 66,891
- Turnout: 59,150; 88.43% (▼0.17 pp)
Candidate	George Forrest	Tom Mitchell	Michael O'Neill
Party	Ind. Unionist	Sinn Féin	Anti-Partition
Popular vote	28,605	24,124	6,421
Percentage	48.36%	40.78%	10.86%
MP before election
Charles Beattie
UUP
Elected MP
George Forrest
Ind. Unionist

A by-election was held in Mid Ulster on 8 May 1956 because both candidates in the 1955 Mid Ulster by-election had been disqualified. Tom Mitchell was disqualified from assuming office because he was a convicted felon. Charles Beattie was awarded the seat but he was also disqualified because he held an office of profit under the Crown. The by-election was won by the Independent Unionist candidate George Forrest.

== Background ==
In the aftermath of the 1955 Mid Ulster by-election, the defeated Unionist candidate Charles Beattie successfully lodged an election petition to have the winner Tom Mitchell removed as MP for being ineligible due to being a convicted felon serving a prison sentence. The seat was subsequently given to Beattie with the votes for Mitchell being treated as being "thrown away". However, it later emerged that at the time of the election, Beattie was a member of an appeals tribunal, considered an "office of profit under the Crown". As a result, the House of Commons voted in favour of the Attorney General for Northern Ireland's motion that this disqualified him from the office of MP and vacated the seat. As a result, another by-election was called for Mid Ulster in 1956.

== Campaign ==
George Forrest stood as an Independent Unionist Candidate. Sinn Fein announced that Mitchell would be contesting the seat again. The Irish Anti-Partition League stood Michael O'Neill as their candidate for the election. This had the effect of splitting the Nationalist vote, which resulted in Forrest being elected as the MP for Mid Ulster.

== Result ==
1956 Mid Ulster by-election
Party	Candidate	Votes	%	±%
Ind. Unionist	George Forrest	28,605	48.36	New
Sinn Féin	Tom Mitchell	24,124	40.78	−9.92
Anti-Partition	Michael O'Neill	6,421	10.86	New
Majority		4,481	7.58	N/A
Turnout		59,150	88.43	−0.17
Registered electors		66,891		
Ind. Unionist gain from Sinn Féin		Swing		

== Aftermath ==
Forrest would retain the Mid Ulster seat at each subsequent election until 1968 when he died.
