= 1997 Dungannon District Council election =

Local govt election in Northern Ireland

← 1993	21 May 1997	2001 →

All 22 seats to Dungannon District Council 12 seats needed for a majority
	First party	Second party	Third party
Party	UUP	Sinn Féin	SDLP
Seats won	8	5	4
Seat change	0	0	0
	Fourth party	Fifth party	Sixth party
Party	DUP	Democratic Left	Ind. Nationalist
Seats won	3	1	1
Seat change	0	0	0
- Results by district electoral area, shaded by First Preference Votes.

Elections to Dungannon District Council were held on 21 May 1997 on the same day as the other Northern Irish local government elections. The election used four district electoral areas to elect a total of 22 councillors.

There was no change from the prior election.

== Election results ==
Dungannon District Council Election Result 1997
Party	Seats	Gains	Losses	Net gain/loss	Seats %	Votes %	Votes	+/−
UUP	8	0	0	0	36.4	30.3	7,445	▼1.5
Sinn Féin	5	0	0	0	22.7	30.0	7,382	▲5.9
SDLP	4	0	0	0	18.2	18.2	4,468	▼2.2
DUP	3	0	0	0	13.6	14.0	3,440	▼0.8
Ind. Nationalist	1	0	0	0	4.5	4.8	1,183	▼1.5
Democratic Left	1	0	0	0	4.5	1.7	412	▼0.2
Alliance	0	0	0	0	0.0	1.1	269	▲1.1

Note: "Votes" are the first preference votes.

== Districts summary ==
Results of the Dungannon District Council election, 1997 by district
Ward	%	Cllrs	%	Cllrs	%	Cllrs	%	Cllrs	%	Cllrs	%	Cllrs	Total Cllrs
Ward	UUP		Sinn Féin		SDLP		DUP		DL		Others		Total Cllrs
Blackwater	43.2	3	15.6	0	16.0	1	25.2	1	0.0	0	0.0	0	5
Clogher Valley	33.2	2	23.2	1	26.8	1	16.8	1	0.0	0	0.0	0	5
Dungannon Town	31.0	2	24.5	1	14.8	1	17.3	1	7.5	1	4.9	0	6
Torrent	16.7	1	51.6	3	15.4	1	0.0	0	0.0	0	16.3	1	6
Total	30.3	8	30.0	5	18.2	4	14.0	3	1.7	1	5.8	1	22

== District results ==
=== Blackwater ===
1993: 3 x UUP, 1 x DUP, 1 x SDLP
1997: 3 x UUP, 1 x DUP, 1 x SDLP
1993-1997 Change: No change

Blackwater - 5 seats
Party	Candidate	FPv%	Count					
Party	Candidate	FPv%	1	2	3	4	5	6
DUP	James Ewing*	10.05%	596	910	1,284			
UUP	Jim Hamilton*	15.27%	905	955	980	1,066		
UUP	Jim Brady*	13.48%	799	847	877	1,001		
UUP	Derek Irwin*	14.47%	858	864	908	964	1,039.51	
SDLP	Patrick Daly*	16.03%	950	953	953	953	953.91	978.48
Sinn Féin	Michelle Gildernew	15.52%	920	920	920	920	920	920
DUP	Robert McFarland	7.64%	453	478				
DUP	Roger Burton	7.54%	447					
Electorate: 7,802 Valid: 5,928 (75.98%) Spoilt: 80 Quota: 989 Turnout: 6,008 (77.01%)

=== Clogher Valley ===
1993: 2 x UUP, 1 x SDLP, 1 x Sinn Féin, 1 x DUP
1997: 2 x UUP, 1 x SDLP, 1 x Sinn Féin, 1 x DUP
1993-1997 Change: No change

Clogher Valley - 5 seats
Party	Candidate	FPv%	Count		
Party	Candidate	FPv%	1	2	3
UUP	Noel Mulligan*	18.62%	1,097		
SDLP	Anthony McGonnell*	18.38%	1,083		
Sinn Féin	Seamus Flanagan	17.45%	1,028		
DUP	William McIlwrath*	16.79%	989		
UUP	Robert Mulligan*	14.54%	857	963.9	963.9
SDLP	Margaret Monaghan	8.47%	499	500.7	562.7
Sinn Féin	Brian Kilpatrick	5.75%	339		
Electorate: 7,503 Valid: 5,892 (78.53%) Spoilt: 91 Quota: 983 Turnout: 5,983 (79.74%)

=== Dungannon Town ===
1993: 2 x UUP, 1 x Sinn Féin, 1 x DUP, 1 x SDLP, 1 x Democratic Left
1997: 2 x UUP, 1 x Sinn Féin, 1 x DUP, 1 x SDLP, 1 x Democratic Left
1993-1997 Change: No change

Dungannon Town - 6 seats
Party	Candidate	FPv%	Count						
Party	Candidate	FPv%	1	2	3	4	5	6	7
Sinn Féin	Vincent Kelly*	19.26%	1,065						
UUP	Joan Carson	17.00%	940						
DUP	Maurice Morrow*	17.27%	955						
UUP	John Reilly	14.05%	777	777	909.94				
SDLP	Vincent Currie*	11.77%	651	661.92	663.11	678.06	802.06		
Democratic Left	Gerry Cullen*	7.45%	412	420.32	437.83	500.85	518.23	696.77	753.89
Sinn Féin	Edward Devlin	5.26%	291	524.74	524.74	524.97	540.35	582.74	583.25
Alliance	Ephrem Bogues	4.86%	269	276.02	279.93	343.87	359.44		
SDLP	Peggy Devlin	3.07%	170	180.14	180.14	186.81			
Electorate: 8,715 Valid: 5,530 (63.45%) Spoilt: 79 Quota: 791 Turnout: 5,609 (64.36%)

=== Torrent ===
1993: 3 x Sinn Féin, 1 x SDLP, 1 x UUP, 1 x Independent Nationalist
1997: 3 x Sinn Féin, 1 x SDLP, 1 x UUP, 1 x Independent Nationalist
1993-1997 Change: No change

Torrent - 6 seats
Party	Candidate	FPv%	Count			
Party	Candidate	FPv%	1	2	3	4
Sinn Féin	Francie Molloy*	19.41%	1,407			
UUP	Norman Badger*	16.72%	1,212			
Ind. Nationalist	Jim Canning*	16.32%	1,183			
Sinn Féin	Michael Gillespie	14.03%	1,017	1,045.6		
SDLP	Jim Cavanagh*	11.48%	832	844.48	1,078.48	
Sinn Féin	Brendan Doris*	11.34%	822	955.64	970.98	990.98
Sinn Féin	Jim O'Donnell	6.80%	493	670.58	687.88	695.88
SDLP	Joseph Gervin	3.90%	283	288.46		
Electorate: 9,730 Valid: 7,249 (74.50%) Spoilt: 159 Quota: 1,036 Turnout: 7,408 (76.14%)
