= 2005 Dungannon and South Tyrone Borough Council election =

Local govt election in Northern Ireland

← 2001	5 May 2005	2011 →

All 22 seats to Dungannon and South Tyrone Borough Council 12 seats needed for a majority
	First party	Second party	Third party
Party	Sinn Féin	DUP	UUP
Seats won	9	5	4
Seat change	▲1	▲2	▼2
	Fourth party	Fifth party
Party	SDLP	Independent
Seats won	4	0
Seat change	0	▼1
- Party with the most votes by district.

Elections to Dungannon and South Tyrone Borough Council were held on 5 May 2005 on the same day as the other Northern Irish local government elections. The election used four district electoral areas to elect a total of 22 councillors.

== Election results ==
Dungannon and South Tyrone Borough Council Election Result 2005
Party	Seats	Gains	Losses	Net gain/loss	Seats %	Votes %	Votes	+/−
Sinn Féin	9	1	0	▲1	40.9	39.6	9,992	▲3.6
DUP	5	2	0	▲1	22.7	24.3	6,132	▲6.7
UUP	4	0	2	▼2	18.2	17.6	4,436	▼5.2
SDLP	4	0	0	0	18.2	14.8	3,726	▼2.4
Independent	0	0	1	▼1	0.0	3.7	923	▼2.7

Note: "Votes" are the first preference votes.

== Districts summary ==
Results of the Dungannon and South Tyrone Borough Council election, 2005 by district
Ward	%	Cllrs	%	Cllrs	%	Cllrs	%	Cllrs	%	Cllrs	Total Cllrs
Ward	Sinn Féin		DUP		UUP		SDLP		Others		Total Cllrs
Blackwater	24.4	1	41.6	2	21.6	1	12.4	1	0.0	0	5
Clogher Valley	32.2	2	27.9	1	20.9	1	18.9	1	0.0	0	5
Dungannon Town	35.2	2	28.1	2	20.6	1	16.1	1	0.0	0	6
Torrent	60.9	4	4.8	0	9.6	1	12.5	1	12.2	1	6
Total	39.6	9	24.3	5	17.6	4	14.8	4	3.7	0	22

== District results ==
=== Blackwater ===
2001: 2 x UUP, 1 x DUP, 1 x Sinn Féin, 1 x SDLP
2005: 2 x DUP, 1 x UUP, 1 x Sinn Féin, 1 x SDLP
2001-2005 Change: DUP gain from UUP

Blackwater - 5 seats
Party	Candidate	FPv%	Count					
Party	Candidate	FPv%	1	2	3	4	5	6
DUP	Roger Burton*	21.22%	1,309					
Sinn Féin	Phelim Gildernew*	17.75%	1,095					
DUP	Samuel Brush	16.13%	995	1,202.27				
UUP	Jim Hamilton*	14.01%	864	884.79	905.13	905.55	1,040.3	
SDLP	Patrick Daly*	12.40%	765	766.05	766.59	782.61	789.87	1,039.87
UUP	Sammy Stewart	7.62%	470	475.67	482.33	482.45	594.88	594.88
Sinn Féin	Josefa Watters	6.66%	411	411	411.18	456.18	458.18	
DUP	Denver Thompson	4.21%	260	298.22	442.94	442.94		
Electorate: 8,116 Valid: 6,169 (76.01%) Spoilt: 97 Quota: 1,029 Turnout: 6,266 (77.21%)

=== Clogher Valley ===
2001: 2 x Sinn Féin, 1 x DUP, 1 x UUP, 1 x SDLP
2005: 2 x Sinn Féin, 1 x DUP, 1 x UUP, 1 x SDLP
2001-2005 Change: No change

Clogher Valley - 5 seats
Party	Candidate	FPv%	Count						
Party	Candidate	FPv%	1	2	3	4	5	6	7
SDLP	Anthony McGonnell*	18.93%	1,134						
Sinn Féin	Sean McGuigan*	13.46%	806	867.44	1,073.44				
UUP	Robert Mulligan*	12.91%	773	784.52	786	1,154			
Sinn Féin	Colla McMahon	12.62%	756	775.04	934.08	939.6	940.76	1,014.47	
DUP	Frances Burton	13.96%	836	836.32	836.32	881.64	959.36	959.36	960.62
DUP	William McIlwrath*	13.98%	837	838.28	840.44	879.56	953.22	953.61	955.56
UUP	Ken Maginnis*	8.00%	479	492.76	495.4				
Sinn Féin	Bronwyn McGahan	6.14%	368	393.12					
Electorate: 7,859 Valid: 5,989 (76.21%) Spoilt: 74 Quota: 999 Turnout: 6,063 (77.15%)

=== Dungannon Town ===
2001: 2 x Sinn Féin, 2 x UUP, 1 x DUP, 1 x SDLP
2005: 2 x Sinn Féin, 2 x DUP, 1 x UUP, 1 x SDLP
2001-2005 Change: DUP gain from UUP

Dungannon Town - 6 seats
Party	Candidate	FPv%	Count				
Party	Candidate	FPv%	1	2	3	4	5
DUP	Maurice Morrow*	18.98%	1,029				
SDLP	Vincent Currie*	16.06%	871				
UUP	Walter Cuddy*	15.40%	835				
Sinn Féin	John McLarnon*	15.07%	817				
DUP	Gilbert Greenaway	9.17%	497	727	728.02	739.15	935.15
Sinn Féin	Barry Monteith*	13.15%	713	713	766.55	767.04	771.44
Sinn Féin	Tony Slevin	6.95%	377	377.5	403.85	404.06	408.54
UUP	Victor McNickle	5.22%	283	305.75	316.63	360.73	
Electorate: 8,281 Valid: 5,422 (65.48%) Spoilt: 80 Quota: 775 Turnout: 5,502 (66.44%)

=== Torrent ===
2001: 3 x Sinn Féin, 1 x SDLP, 1 x UUP, 1 x Independent
2005: 4 x Sinn Féin, 1 x SDLP, 1 x UUP
2001-2005 Change: Sinn Féin gain from Independent

Torrent - 6 seats
Party	Candidate	FPv%	Count					
Party	Candidate	FPv%	1	2	3	4	5	6
Sinn Féin	Michael Gillespie*	18.24%	1,392					
Sinn Féin	Michelle O'Neill	16.64%	1,270					
Sinn Féin	Francie Molloy*	15.37%	1,173					
Sinn Féin	Desmond Donnelly*	10.68%	815	1,090.44	1,090.66	1,247.74		
UUP	Norman Badger*	9.59%	732	732.22	1,076.22	1,076.5	1,076.5	1,077.88
SDLP	Jim Cavanagh*	12.53%	956	968.32	972.32	978.2	990.1	1,025.29
Independent	Jim Canning*	12.10%	923	927.84	932.84	941.94	958.88	1,002.81
DUP	Robert McFarland	4.84%	369	369.44				
Electorate: 10,410 Valid: 7,630 (73.29%) Spoilt: 90 Quota: 1,091 Turnout: 7,720 (74.16%)
