= 1993 Dungannon District Council election =

Local govt election in Northern Ireland

← 1989	19 May 1993	1997 →

All 22 seats to Dungannon District Council 12 seats needed for a majority
	First party	Second party	Third party
Party	UUP	Sinn Féin	SDLP
Seats won	8	5	4
Seat change	0	▲2	▼1
	Fourth party	Fifth party	Sixth party
Party	DUP	Democratic Left	Ind. Nationalist
Seats won	3	1	1
Seat change	0	▲1	▼1
	Seventh party
Party	Workers' Party
Seats won	0
Seat change	▼1
- Party with the most votes by district.

Elections to Dungannon District Council were held on 19 May 1993 on the same day as the other Northern Irish local government elections. The election used four district electoral areas to elect a total of 22 councillors.

== Election results ==
Dungannon District Council Election Result 1993
Party	Seats	Gains	Losses	Net gain/loss	Seats %	Votes %	Votes	+/−
UUP	8	0	0	0	36.4	31.8	7,680	▼5.7
Sinn Féin	5	2	0	▲2	22.7	24.1	5,818	▲5.4
SDLP	4	0	1	▼1	18.2	20.4	4,934	▲0.3
DUP	3	0	0	0	13.6	14.8	3,562	▲1.7
Ind. Nationalist	1	0	1	▼1	4.5	6.3	1,511	▼3.2
Democratic Left	1	1	0	▲1	4.5	1.9	457	New
Ind. Unionist	0	0	0	0	0.0	0.7	174	▲0.7

Note: "Votes" are the first preference votes.

== Districts summary ==
Results of the Dungannon District Council election, 1993 by district
Ward	%	Cllrs	%	Cllrs	%	Cllrs	%	Cllrs	%	Cllrs	%	Cllrs	Total Cllrs
Ward	UUP		Sinn Féin		SDLP		DUP		DL		Others		Total Cllrs
Blackwater	43.7	3	9.5	0	18.2	1	28.6	1	0.0	0	0.0	0	5
Clogher Valley	33.5	2	19.5	1	28.9	1	18.1	1	0.0	0	0.0	0	5
Dungannon Town	33.6	2	20.4	1	12.3	1	15.6	1	7.9	1	10.2	0	6
Torrent	19.2	1	43.0	3	21.9	1	0.0	0	0.0	0	15.9	1	6
Total	31.8	8	24.1	5	20.4	4	14.8	3	1.9	1	7.0	1	22

== District results ==
=== Blackwater ===
1989: 3 x UUP, 1 x DUP, 1 x SDLP
1993: 3 x UUP, 1 x DUP, 1 x SDLP
1989-1993 Change: No change

Blackwater - 5 seats
Party	Candidate	FPv%	Count		
Party	Candidate	FPv%	1	2	3
DUP	James Ewing*	18.58%	1,038		
SDLP	Patrick Daly*	18.20%	1,017		
UUP	Derek Irwin*	14.93%	834	849.3	871.3
UUP	Jim Brady*	14.98%	837	848	864
UUP	Jim Hamilton*	13.76%	769	776.7	788.7
DUP	Robert McFarland	10.01%	559	627	635
Sinn Féin	Anthony Fox	9.54%	533	533	
Electorate: 7,461 Valid: 5,587 (74.88%) Spoilt: 98 Quota: 932 Turnout: 5,685 (76.20%)

=== Clogher Valley ===
1989: 2 x UUP, 1 x SDLP, 1 x Sinn Féin, 1 x DUP
1993: 2 x UUP, 1 x SDLP, 1 x Sinn Féin, 1 x DUP
1989-1993 Change: No change

Clogher Valley - 5 seats
Party	Candidate	FPv%	Count		
Party	Candidate	FPv%	1	2	3
Sinn Féin	Raymond McMahon*	19.45%	1,141		
UUP	Noel Mulligan*	18.87%	1,107		
SDLP	Anthony McGonnell*	18.16%	1,065		
DUP	William McIlwrath*	18.07%	1,060		
UUP	Robert Mulligan	14.68%	861	863.73	991.17
SDLP	Bernadette McGirr	10.76%	631	787.39	788.71
Electorate: 7,228 Valid: 5,865 (81.14%) Spoilt: 99 Quota: 978 Turnout: 5,964 (82.51%)

=== Dungannon Town ===
1989: 2 x UUP, 1 x DUP, 1 x SDLP, 1 x Workers' Party, 1 x Independent Nationalist
1993: 2 x UUP, 1 x DUP, 1 x SDLP, 1 x Sinn Féin, 1 x Democratic Left
1989-1993 Change: Sinn Féin gain from Independent Nationalist, Workers' Party joins Democratic Left

Dungannon Town - 6 seats
Party	Candidate	FPv%	Count						
Party	Candidate	FPv%	1	2	3	4	5	6	7
Sinn Féin	Vincent Kelly	20.35%	1,180						
DUP	Maurice Morrow*	15.61%	905						
UUP	Leslie Holmes	13.82%	801	801.65	876.65				
UUP	William Brown*	11.54%	669	669	691.65	714.87	725.79	1,129.79	
SDLP	Vincent Currie*	10.16%	589	641	746.7	747.06	748.88	771.43	834.43
Democratic Left	Gerry Cullen*	7.88%	457	524.6	566.8	579.76	589.77	642.03	708.03
Ind. Nationalist	Michael McLoughlin*	7.17%	416	613.6	631.55	632.09	632.09	644.03	670.03
UUP	Ken Maginnis*	8.31%	482	489.15	529.15	564.25	588.82		
Ind. Unionist	Simon Dilworth	3.00%	174	174.65					
SDLP	Peggy Devlin	2.16%	125	148.4					
Electorate: 8,451 Valid: 5,798 (68.61%) Spoilt: 75 Quota: 829 Turnout: 5,873 (69.49%)

=== Torrent ===
1989: 2 x Sinn Féin, 2 x SDLP, 1 x UUP, 1 x Independent Nationalist
1993: 3 x Sinn Féin, 1 x SDLP, 1 x UUP, 1 x Independent Nationalist
1989-1993 Change: Sinn Féin gain from SDLP

Torrent - 6 seats
Party	Candidate	FPv%	Count					
Party	Candidate	FPv%	1	2	3	4	5	6
Sinn Féin	Francie Molloy	21.52%	1,482					
UUP	Norman Badger	19.17%	1,320					
Ind. Nationalist	Jim Canning*	15.90%	1,095					
Sinn Féin	Brendan Doris*	10.33%	711	1,138.32				
SDLP	Jim Cavanagh*	11.98%	825	835.44	982.8	985.14		
Sinn Féin	Denise Sutton	11.20%	771	810.6	811.56	955.99	962.49	978.88
SDLP	Angela Donnelly*	4.65%	320	323.6	471.92	472.05	516.25	817.95
SDLP	Joe Gervin	5.26%	362	368.12	403.16	404.85	462.44	
Electorate: 9,047 Valid: 6,886 (76.11%) Spoilt: 166 Quota: 984 Turnout: 7,052 (77.95%)
