= 2001 Dungannon and South Tyrone Borough Council election =

Local govt election in Northern Ireland

← 1997	7 June 2001	2005 →

All 22 seats to Dungannon and South Tyrone Borough Council 12 seats needed for a majority
	First party	Second party	Third party
Party	Sinn Féin	UUP	SDLP
Seats won	8	6	4
Seat change	▲3	▼2	0
	Fourth party	Fifth party	Sixth party
Party	DUP	Independent	Democratic Left
Seats won	3	1	0
Seat change	0	▲1	▼1
	Seventh party
Party	Ind. Nationalist
Seats won	0
Seat change	▼1
- Party with the most votes by district.

Elections to Dungannon and South Tyrone Borough Council were held on 7 June 2001 on the same day as the other Northern Irish local government elections. The election used four district electoral areas to elect a total of 22 councillors.

== Election results ==
Dungannon and South Tyrone Borough Council Election Result 2001
Party	Seats	Gains	Losses	Net gain/loss	Seats %	Votes %	Votes	+/−
Sinn Féin	8	3	0	▲3	36.4	36.0	10,076	▲6.0
UUP	6	0	2	▼2	27.3	22.8	6,380	▼7.5
SDLP	4	0	0	0	18.2	17.2	4,824	▼1.0
DUP	3	0	0	0	13.6	17.6	4,921	▲3.6
Independent	1	1	0	▲1	4.5	6.4	1,793	▲6.4

Note: "Votes" are the first preference votes.

== Districts summary ==
Results of the Dungannon and South Tyrone Borough Council election, 2001 by district
Ward	%	Cllrs	%	Cllrs	%	Cllrs	%	Cllrs	%	Cllrs	Total Cllrs
Ward	Sinn Féin		UUP		SDLP		DUP		Others		Total Cllrs
Blackwater	22.6	1	33.6	2	14.2	1	29.6	1	0.0	0	5
Clogher Valley	30.2	2	25.1	1	23.0	1	21.7	1	0.0	0	5
Dungannon Town	30.3	2	24.7	2	17.3	1	19.2	1	8.5	0	6
Torrent	55.5	3	10.9	1	15.2	1	3.6	0	14.8	1	6
Total	36.0	8	22.8	6	17.2	4	17.6	3	6.4	1	22

== District results ==
=== Blackwater ===
1997: 3 x UUP, 1 x DUP, 1 x SDLP
2001: 2 x UUP, 1 x DUP, 1 x SDLP, 1 x Sinn Féin
1997-2001 Change: Sinn Féin gain from UUP

Blackwater - 5 seats
Party	Candidate	FPv%	Count					
Party	Candidate	FPv%	1	2	3	4	5	6
Sinn Féin	Phelim Gildernew	15.45%	1,032	1,441				
SDLP	Patrick Daly*	14.20%	948	989	1,229			
UUP	Jim Hamilton*	11.61%	775	775	775	779	1,195	
UUP	Derek Irwin*	11.99%	801	802	804	818	981	1,055.48
DUP	Roger Burton	14.84%	991	991	991	993	1,051	1,052.71
DUP	James Ewing*	14.75%	985	985	986	987	1,016	1,017.71
UUP	Jim Brady*	10.02%	669	670	671	675		
Sinn Féin	Dominic Molloy	7.14%	477					
Electorate: 8,102 Valid: 6,678 (82.42%) Spoilt: 107 Quota: 1,114 Turnout: 6,785 (83.74%)

=== Clogher Valley ===
1997: 2 x UUP, 1 x Sinn Féin, 1 x SDLP, 1 x DUP
2001: 2 x Sinn Féin, 1 x UUP, 1 x SDLP, 1 x DUP
1997-2001 Change: Sinn Féin gain from UUP

Clogher Valley - 5 seats
Party	Candidate	FPv%	Count					
Party	Candidate	FPv%	1	2	3	4	5	6
Sinn Féin	Seamus Flanagan*	17.87%	1,159					
SDLP	Anthony McGonnell*	17.73%	1,150					
DUP	William McIlwrath*	12.58%	816	817	817.07	1,321.07		
UUP	Robert Mulligan*	14.66%	951	992	992	1,028	1,143.5	
Sinn Féin	Sean McGuigan	12.32%	799	903	975.03	975.03	975.69	1,031.4
UUP	Donald Beatty	10.50%	681	690	690.14	733.14	853.26	858.93
DUP	David Robinson	9.08%	589	592	592			
SDLP	Thomas Murphy	5.27%	342					
Electorate: 7,827 Valid: 6,487 (82.88%) Spoilt: 127 Quota: 1,082 Turnout: 6,614 (84.50%)

=== Dungannon Town ===
1997: 2 x UUP, 1 x Sinn Féin, 1 x DUP, 1 x SDLP, 1 x Democratic Left
2001: 2 x UUP, 2 x Sinn Féin, 1 x DUP, 1 x SDLP
1997-2001 Change: Sinn Féin gain from Democratic Left

Dungannon Town - 6 seats
Party	Candidate	FPv%	Count						
Party	Candidate	FPv%	1	2	3	4	5	6	7
Sinn Féin	John McLarnon	17.67%	1,138						
SDLP	Vincent Currie*	17.24%	1,110						
Sinn Féin	Barry Monteith	12.63%	813	1,010.8					
DUP	Maurice Morrow*	13.56%	873	873.2	874.35	1,123.35			
UUP	Walter Cuddy	13.25%	853	854.2	862.25	919.25	1,033.33		
UUP	Ken Maginnis	11.49%	740	741.2	760.06	785.06	826.46	895.46	899.06
Independent	Gerry Cullen*	8.53%	549	565	719.79	743.02	789.02	820.3	888.1
DUP	Derek Greenaway	5.64%	363	363.2	363.89				
Electorate: 8,742 Valid: 6,439 (73.66%) Spoilt: 91 Quota: 920 Turnout: 6,530 (74.70%)

=== Torrent ===
1997: 3 x Sinn Féin, 1 x SDLP, 1 x UUP, 1 x Independent Nationalist
2001: 3 x Sinn Féin, 1 x SDLP, 1 x UUP, 1 x Independent
1997-2001 Change: Independent Nationalist becomes Independent

Torrent - 6 seats
Party	Candidate	FPv%	Count						
Party	Candidate	FPv%	1	2	3	4	5	6	7
Sinn Féin	Francie Molloy*	16.60%	1,393						
Sinn Féin	Michael Gillespie*	15.92%	1,336						
SDLP	Jim Cavanagh*	15.18%	1,274						
Independent	Jim Canning*	14.83%	1,244						
UUP	Norman Badger*	10.85%	910	1,198	1,198.6	1,198.7	1,207.94		
Sinn Féin	Desmond Donnelly	11.25%	944	944	1,076.6	1,098.9	1,155.99	1,176.44	1,177.76
Sinn Féin	Brendan Doris*	11.74%	985	985	1,043.8	1,146.6	1,152.65	1,170.05	1,170.6
DUP	Robert McFarland	3.62%	304						
Electorate: 10,314 Valid: 8,390 (81.35%) Spoilt: 172 Quota: 1,199 Turnout: 8,562 (83.01%)
