= 1985 Dungannon District Council election =

Local govt election in Northern Ireland

← 1981	15 May 1985	1989 →

All 22 seats to Dungannon District Council 12 seats needed for a majority
	First party	Second party	Third party
Party	UUP	SDLP	Sinn Féin
Seats won	8	5	4
Seat change	Steady	▲2	▲4
	Fourth party	Fifth party	Sixth party
Party	DUP	Ind. Nationalist	Ind. Republican
Seats won	3	2	0
Seat change	Steady	▼1	▼2
	Seventh party
Party	Irish Independence
Seats won	0
Seat change	▼1

Elections to Dungannon District Council were held on 15 May 1985 on the same day as the other Northern Irish local government elections. The election used four district electoral areas to elect a total of 22 councillors.

== Election results ==
Dungannon District Council Election Result 1985
Party	Seats	Gains	Losses	Net gain/loss	Seats %	Votes %	Votes	+/−
UUP	8	0	0	0	36.4	32.1	7,848	▲1.1
SDLP	5	2	0	▲2	13.6	17.6	4,293	▼2.9
Sinn Féin	4	4	0	▲4	18.2	22.9	5,592	New
DUP	3	0	0	0	13.6	17.2	4,202	▼0.5
Ind. Nationalist	2	0	1	▼1	9.1	9.7	2,363	▼5.9
Ind. Republican	0	0	2	▼2	0.0	0.6	140	▼6.2

Note: "Votes" are the first preference votes.

== Districts summary ==
Results of the Dungannon District Council election, 1985 by district
Ward	%	Cllrs	%	Cllrs	%	Cllrs	%	Cllrs	%	Cllrs	Total Cllrs
Ward	UUP		SDLP		Sinn Féin		DUP		Others		Total Cllrs
Blackwater	44.1	3	14.6	1	13.8	0	27.5	1	0.0	0	5
Clogher Valley	31.7	2	27.1	1	21.0	1	20.2	1	0.0	0	5
Dungannon Town	37.0	2	10.4	1	18.8	0	18.0	1	15.8	1	6
Torrent	17.3	1	17.9	2	36.6	2	4.5	0	23.7	1	6
Total	32.1	8	17.6	5	22.9	4	17.2	3	10.2	2	22

== District results ==
=== Blackwater ===
1985: 3 x UUP, 1 x DUP, 1 x SDLP

Blackwater - 5 seats
Party	Candidate	FPv%	Count				
Party	Candidate	FPv%	1	2	3	4	5
DUP	James Ewing*	16.86%	979				
UUP	Derek Irwin*	13.85%	804	1,143			
UUP	Jim Brady*	10.73%	623	688	736.76	1,019.29	
UUP	John Taggart*	10.56%	613	689	808.78	1,109.49	
SDLP	Patrick Daly*	14.61%	848	851	851	852	878
Sinn Féin	Eilish McCabe	13.83%	803	804	804	804	805
DUP	Norman Lockhart	10.61%	616	645	651.36		
UUP	Rodney Mullan	8.96%	520				
Electorate: 7,076 Valid: 5,806 (82.05%) Spoilt: 89 Quota: 968 Turnout: 5,895 (83.31%)

=== Clogher Valley ===
1985: 2 x UUP, 1 x SDLP, 1 x Sinn Féin, 1 x DUP

Clogher Valley - 5 seats
Party	Candidate	FPv%	Count			
Party	Candidate	FPv%	1	2	3	4
Sinn Féin	Seamus Cassidy*	20.98%	1,280			
SDLP	Anthony McGonnell*	17.13%	1,045			
UUP	Samuel Brush*	16.40%	1,001			
DUP	William McIlwrath*	10.96%	669	669.84	1,144.26	
UUP	Noel Mulligan*	15.29%	933	934.26	949.26	1,050.24
SDLP	John Monaghan	10.03%	612	866.52	871.94	891.94
DUP	Thomas Maxwell	9.21%	562	564.52		
Electorate: 7,003 Valid: 6,102 (87.13%) Spoilt: 93 Quota: 1,018 Turnout: 6,195 (88.46%)

=== Dungannon Town ===
1985: 2 x UUP, 1 x Sinn Féin, 1 x DUP, 1 x SDLP, 1 x Independent Nationalist

Dungannon Town - 6 seats
Party	Candidate	FPv%	Count					
Party	Candidate	FPv%	1	2	3	4	5	6
UUP	Ken Maginnis*	21.99%	1,329					
DUP	Maurice Morrow*	17.97%	1,086					
Ind. Nationalist	Michael McLoughlin*	15.87%	959					
UUP	William Brown*	14.97%	905					
SDLP	Vincent Currie	7.02%	424	813	984			
Sinn Féin	Anita Cavlan	10.62%	642	644	646	648.79	663.79	737.28
Sinn Féin	Martin McNulty	8.17%	494	494	495	495.93	510.63	570.07
SDLP	Terence Foley	3.39%	205	259	286	402.25	459.65	
Electorate: 8,157 Valid: 6,044 (74.10%) Spoilt: 124 Quota: 864 Turnout: 6,168 (75.62%)

=== Torrent ===
1985: 2 x Sinn Féin, 2 x SDLP, 1 x UUP, 1 x Independent Nationalist

Torrent - 6 seats
Party	Candidate	FPv%	Count					
Party	Candidate	FPv%	1	2	3	4	5	6
UUP	Thomas Kempton*	17.27%	1,120					
Sinn Féin	Francie Molloy	16.64%	1,079					
Ind. Nationalist	Jim Canning*	13.14%	852	853.44	923.44	935.2		
Sinn Féin	Brian Duffin	10.07%	653	653	668	785.6	786.6	821.3
SDLP	Patrick McGlinchey*	8.80%	571	572.26	590.26	594.04	628.6	789.4
SDLP	Jim Cavanagh	9.07%	588	588.36	609.36	610.48	648	773.92
Sinn Féin	Frances Donaghy	9.88%	641	641	644	653.38	653.38	763.08
Ind. Nationalist	Owen Nugent*	8.51%	552	553.08	561.08	564.16	596.38	
DUP	Edith White	4.47%	290	478.64	479.64	479.64		
Ind. Republican	John Corr*	2.16%	140	140				
Electorate: 8,203 Valid: 6,486 (79.07%) Spoilt: 174 Quota: 927 Turnout: 6,660 (81.19%)
