= 1989 Dungannon District Council election =

Local govt election in Northern Ireland

← 1985	17 May 1989	1993 →

All 22 seats to Dungannon District Council 12 seats needed for a majority
	First party	Second party	Third party
Party	UUP	SDLP	Sinn Féin
Seats won	8	5	3
Seat change	Steady	Steady	▼1
	Fourth party	Fifth party	Sixth party
Party	DUP	Ind. Nationalist	Workers' Party
Seats won	3	2	1
Seat change	Steady	Steady	▲1

Elections to Dungannon District Council were held on 17 May 1989 on the same day as the other Northern Irish local government elections. The election used four district electoral areas to elect a total of 22 councillors.

== Election results ==
Dungannon District Council Election Result 1989
Party	Seats	Gains	Losses	Net gain/loss	Seats %	Votes %	Votes	+/−
UUP	8	0	0	0	36.4	37.5	8,775	▲5.4
SDLP	5	0	0	0	22.7	20.1	4,711	▲2.5
Sinn Féin	3	0	1	▼1	13.6	18.7	4,369	▼4.2
DUP	3	0	0	0	13.6	13.1	3,059	▼4.1
Ind. Nationalist	2	0	0	0	9.1	9.5	2,226	▼0.7
Workers' Party	1	1	0	▲1	4.5	1.1	276	▲1.1

Note: "Votes" are the first preference votes.

== Districts summary ==
Results of the Dungannon District Council election, 1989 by district
Ward	%	Cllrs	%	Cllrs	%	Cllrs	%	Cllrs	%	Cllrs	%	Cllrs	Total Cllrs
Ward	UUP		SDLP		Sinn Féin		DUP		Workers' Party		Others		Total Cllrs
Blackwater	49.0	3	17.1	1	10.4	0	23.5	1	0.0	0	0.0	0	5
Clogher Valley	38.5	2	29.5	1	16.5	1	15.5	1	0.0	0	0.0	0	5
Dungannon Town	42.7	2	13.2	1	13.7	0	14.4	1	5.1	1	10.9	1	6
Torrent	21.3	1	20.1	2	32.6	2	0.0	0	0.0	0	26.0	1	6
Total	37.5	8	20.1	5	18.7	3	13.1	3	1.1	1	9.5	2	22

== District results ==
=== Blackwater ===
1985: 3 x UUP, 1 x DUP, 1 x SDLP
1989: 3 x UUP, 1 x DUP, 1 x SDLP
1985-1989 Change: No change

Blackwater - 5 seats
Party	Candidate	FPv%	Count	
Party	Candidate	FPv%	1	2
DUP	James Ewing*	23.52%	1,345	
UUP	Derek Irwin*	17.50%	1,001	
SDLP	Patrick Daly*	17.14%	980	
UUP	Jim Hamilton	16.02%	916	1,107.89
UUP	Jim Brady*	15.46%	884	1,078.37
Sinn Féin	Tony Gildernew	10.37%	593	594.55
Electorate: 7,203 Valid: 5,719 (79.40%) Spoilt: 128 Quota: 954 Turnout: 5,847 (81.17%)

=== Clogher Valley ===
1985: 2 x UUP, 1 x SDLP, 1 x Sinn Féin, 1 x DUP
1989: 2 x UUP, 1 x SDLP, 1 x Sinn Féin, 1 x DUP
1985-1989 Change: No change

Clogher Valley - 5 seats
Party	Candidate	FPv%	Count		
Party	Candidate	FPv%	1	2	3
UUP	Noel Mulligan*	19.71%	1,171		
UUP	Samuel Brush*	18.80%	1,117		
SDLP	Anthony McGonnell*	17.86%	1,061		
DUP	William McIlwrath*	15.47%	919	1,082.2	
Sinn Féin	Raymond McMahon	16.53%	982	983.28	991.32
SDLP	John Monaghan	11.62%	690	696.08	813.33
Electorate: 7,065 Valid: 5,940 (84.08%) Spoilt: 142 Quota: 991 Turnout: 6,082 (86.09%)

=== Dungannon Town ===
1985: 2 x UUP, 1 x DUP, 1 x SDLP, 1 x Sinn Féin, 1 x Independent Nationalist
1989: 2 x UUP, 1 x DUP, 1 x SDLP, 1 x Workers' Party, 1 x Independent Nationalist
1985-1989 Change: Workers' Party gain from Sinn Féin

Dungannon Town - 6 seats
Party	Candidate	FPv%	Count						
Party	Candidate	FPv%	1	2	3	4	5	6	7
UUP	Ken Maginnis*	26.86%	1,479						
UUP	William Brown*	15.87%	874						
DUP	Maurice Morrow*	14.44%	795						
SDLP	Vincent Currie*	10.35%	570	747	880				
Ind. Nationalist	Michael McLoughlin*	10.90%	600	738	750	827.6			
Workers' Party	Gerry Cullen	5.01%	276	595	626	640.4	725.52	765.84	771.16
Sinn Féin	Peter Corrigan	13.75%	757	759	760	760.8	761.94	761.94	762
SDLP	Peggy Devlin	2.83%	156	197					
Electorate: 8,169 Valid: 5,507 (67.41%) Spoilt: 120 Quota: 787 Turnout: 5,627 (68.88%)

=== Torrent ===
1985: 2 x Sinn Féin, 2 x SDLP, 1 x UUP, 1 x Independent Nationalist
1989: 2 x Sinn Féin, 2 x SDLP, 1 x UUP, 1 x Independent Nationalist
1985-1989 Change: No change

Torrent - 6 seats
Party	Candidate	FPv%	Count					
Party	Candidate	FPv%	1	2	3	4	5	6
Ind. Nationalist	Jim Canning*	26.02%	1,626					
UUP	Thomas Kempton*	21.33%	1,333					
SDLP	Jim Cavanagh*	10.93%	683	1,148.01				
SDLP	Angela Donnelly	5.71%	357	383.95	733.11	835.48	984.48	
Sinn Féin	Brendan Doris	12.13%	758	835.91	836.77	848.66	878.44	884.44
Sinn Féin	Martin McCaughey	11.66%	729	737.33	740.77	743.09	752.53	753.53
Sinn Féin	John Corr	8.80%	550	617.62	624.5	656.4	688.57	697.57
SDLP	Bridie O'Donnell	3.42%	214	294.85	373.11	476.64		
Electorate: 8,643 Valid: 6,250 (72.31%) Spoilt: 222 Quota: 893 Turnout: 6,472 (74.88%)
