= 2011 Dungannon and South Tyrone Borough Council election =

Local govt election in Northern Ireland

← 2005	5 May 2011	2014 →

All 22 seats to Dungannon and South Tyrone Borough Council 12 seats needed for a majority
	First party	Second party	Third party
Party	Sinn Féin	DUP	UUP
Seats won	8	6	4
Seat change	▼1	▲1	0
	Fourth party	Fifth party
Party	SDLP	Independent
Seats won	3	1
Seat change	▼1	▲1
- Party with the most votes by district.

Elections to Dungannon and South Tyrone Borough Council were held on 5 May 2011 on the same day as the other Northern Irish local government elections. The election used four district electoral areas to elect a total of 22 councillors.

== Election results ==
Dungannon and South Tyrone Borough Council Election Result 2011
Party	Seats	Gains	Losses	Net gain/loss	Seats %	Votes %	Votes	+/−
Sinn Féin	8	0	1	▼1	36.4	34.5	8,300	▼5.1
DUP	6	1	0	▲1	27.3	21.8	5,259	▼2.5
UUP	4	0	0	0	18.2	18.8	4,523	▲1.2
SDLP	3	0	1	▼1	13.6	13.9	3,356	▼0.9
Independent	1	1	0	▲1	0.0	8.5	2,039	▲4.8
TUV	0	0	0	0	0.0	1.7	408	New
Alliance	0	0	0	0	0.0	0.9	206	▲0.9

Note: "Votes" are the first preference votes.

== Districts summary ==
Results of the Dungannon and South Tyrone Borough Council election, 2011 by district
Ward	%	Cllrs	%	Cllrs	%	Cllrs	%	Cllrs	%	Cllrs	Total Cllrs
Ward	Sinn Féin		DUP		UUP		SDLP		Others		Total Cllrs
Blackwater	27.0	1	32.9	2	25.6	1	10.4	1	4.1	0	5
Clogher Valley	31.2	1	28.8	2	21.7	1	18.3	1	0.0	0	5
Dungannon Town	22.1	2	23.8	2	16.9	1	10.4	0	26.8	1	6
Torrent	53.0	4	4.9	0	11.7	1	16.1	1	14.3	0	6
Total	34.5	8	21.8	6	18.8	4	13.9	3	11.0	1	22

== District results ==
=== Blackwater ===
2005: 2 x DUP, 1 x Sinn Féin, 1 x UUP, 1 x SDLP
2011: 2 x DUP, 1 x Sinn Féin, 1 x UUP, 1 x SDLP
2005-2011 Change: No change

Blackwater - 5 seats
Party	Candidate	FPv%	Count				
Party	Candidate	FPv%	1	2	3	4	5
Sinn Féin	Phelim Gildernew*	20.29%	1,246				
DUP	Roger Burton*	16.54%	1,016	1,016.54	1,089.54		
DUP	Samuel Brush*	16.37%	1,005	1,005.54	1,051.54		
SDLP	Patrick Daly*	10.42%	640	671.86	675.86	675.86	1,010.7
UUP	Jim Hamilton*	12.88%	791	791.72	858.72	882.72	885.7
UUP	Jim Brady	12.72%	781	783.16	822.16	855.16	857.24
Sinn Féin	Brian Murtagh	6.74%	414	592.56	592.56	592.56	
TUV	John Hobson	4.04%	248	248			
Electorate: 8,983 Valid: 6,141 (68.36%) Spoilt: 117 Quota: 1,024 Turnout: 6,258 (69.66%)

=== Clogher Valley ===
2005: 2 x Sinn Féin, 1 x DUP, 1 x UUP, 1 x SDLP
2011: 2 x DUP, 1 x Sinn Féin, 1 x UUP, 1 x SDLP
2005-2011 Change: DUP gain from Sinn Féin

Clogher Valley - 5 seats
Party	Candidate	FPv%	Count				
Party	Candidate	FPv%	1	2	3	4	5
SDLP	Anthony McGonnell*	18.31%	1,046				
UUP	Robert Mulligan*	14.91%	852	1,167			
DUP	Frances Burton*	16.57%	947	990			
Sinn Féin	Sean McGuigan*	15.91%	909	911	911.93	979.47	
DUP	Wills Robinson	12.18%	696	716	927.11	929.97	965.85
Sinn Féin	Colla McMahon*	15.30%	874	874	874.93	890.77	891.69
UUP	Winston Duff	6.83%	390				
Electorate: 8,355 Valid: 5,714 (68.39%) Spoilt: 107 Quota: 953 Turnout: 5,821 (69.67%)

=== Dungannon Town ===
2005: 2 x DUP, 2 x Sinn Féin, 1 x UUP, 1 x SDLP
2011: 2 x DUP, 2 x Sinn Féin, 1 x UUP, 1 x Independent
2005-2011 Change: Sinn Féin gain from SDLP, Independent leaves Sinn Féin

Dungannon Town - 6 seats
Party	Candidate	FPv%	Count								
Party	Candidate	FPv%	1	2	3	4	5	6	7	8	9
Independent	Barry Monteith*	19.86%	1,046								
DUP	Maurice Morrow*	16.40%	864								
Sinn Féin	John McLarnon*	13.16%	693	885.28							
UUP	Walter Cuddy*	13.69%	721	722.9	725.14	740.09	796.09				
DUP	Kim Ashton	7.35%	387	387	387.32	471.04	524.73	533.1	554.27	717.78	721.78
Sinn Féin	Bronwyn McGahan	8.96%	472	519.5	626.7	627.09	628.09	628.09	632.51	633.51	674.5
SDLP	Vincent Currie*	5.90%	311	329.62	343.06	343.06	345.06	346.92	394.62	423.18	647.44
SDLP	Malachy Quinn	4.50%	237	254.48	260.24	260.63	260.63	260.63	309.29	321.42	
UUP	Sammy Stewart	3.23%	170	170	170.32	176.82	210.34	236.38	305.3		
Alliance	Hannah Su	3.91%	206	214.74	216.98	219.06	227.51	234.02			
TUV	Denis Boyd	3.04%	160	160	160.32	162.92					
Electorate: 8,814 Valid: 5,267 (59.76%) Spoilt: 102 Quota: 753 Turnout: 5,369 (60.91%)

=== Torrent ===
2005: 4 x Sinn Féin, 1 x SDLP, 1 x UUP
2011: 4 x Sinn Féin, 1 x SDLP, 1 x UUP
2005-2011 Change: No change

Torrent - 6 seats
Party	Candidate	FPv%	Count						
Party	Candidate	FPv%	1	2	3	4	5	6	7
Sinn Féin	Michael Gillespie*	16.53%	1,152						
SDLP	Jim Cavanagh*	16.10%	1,122						
Sinn Féin	Joe O'Neill*	15.07%	1,050						
UUP	Kenneth Reid	11.74%	818	818.42	820.76	1,131.76			
Sinn Féin	Desmond Donnelly*	11.69%	815	838.38	871.14	872.4	874.4	908.95	1,032.95
Sinn Féin	Pádraig Quinn	9.69%	675	800.44	812.92	813.92	813.92	825.97	971.93
Independent	Patricia Campbell	7.32%	510	514.34	535.4	540.53	577.53	578.93	722.97
Independent	James Walshe	6.93%	483	484.68	532.13	539.26	575.26	578.11	
DUP	Johnny Chartres	4.94%	344	344	345.04				
Electorate: 11,130 Valid: 6,969 (62.61%) Spoilt: 104 Quota: 996 Turnout: 7,073 (63.55%)
