= Clogher Valley (District Electoral Area) =

District electoral area in Northern Ireland

- Mid Ulster District Council DEA constituency

Current constituency
- Created: 1985
- Seats: 5 (1985-2014); 6 (2014-)
- Councillors: Frances Burton (DUP); Gael Gildernew (SF); Meta Graham (UUP); Eugene McConnell (SF); Kevin McElvogue (IND); Mark Robinson (DUP)

Clogher Valley DEA within Mid Ulster

Clogher Valley DEA (1993-2014) within Dungannon

Clogher Valley is one of the seven district electoral areas (DEA) in Mid Ulster, Northern Ireland. The district elects six members to Mid Ulster District Council and contains the wards of Augher and Clogher, Aughnacloy, Ballygawley, Caledon, Castlecaulfield and Fivemiletown. Clogher Valley forms part of the Fermanagh and South Tyrone constituencies for the Northern Ireland Assembly and UK Parliament.

It was created for the 1985 local elections, replacing Dungannon Area A which had existed since 1973, where it originally contained five wards (Augher, Ballygawley, Castlecaulfield, Clogher and Fivemiletown). For the 2014 local elections it gained Aughnacloy and Caledon from the abolished Blackwater DEA.

== Councillors ==
Election	Councillor (Party)	Councillor (Party)	Councillor (Party)	Councillor (Party)	Councillor (Party)	Councillor (Party)
2023	Frances Burton (DUP)	Mark Robinson (DUP)	Meta Graham (UUP)	Kevin McElvogue (Independent)	Eugene McConnell (Sinn Féin)	Gael Gildernew (Sinn Féin)
December 2022 Co-Option	Frances Burton (DUP)	Mark Robinson (DUP)	Meta Graham (UUP)	Sharon McAleer (SDLP)	Sean McGuigan (Sinn Féin)	Phelim Gildernew (Sinn Féin)
2019	Frances Burton (DUP)	Wills Robinson (DUP)	Meta Graham (UUP)	Sharon McAleer (SDLP)	Sean McGuigan (Sinn Féin)	Phelim Gildernew (Sinn Féin)
2014	Frances Burton (DUP)	Wills Robinson (DUP)	Robert Mulligan (UUP)	Sharon McAleer (SDLP)	Sean McGuigan (Sinn Féin)	Phelim Gildernew (Sinn Féin)
2011	Frances Burton (DUP)	Wills Robinson (DUP)	Robert Mulligan (UUP)	Anthony McGonnell (SDLP)	Sean McGuigan (Sinn Féin)	5 seats 1985–2014
2005	Frances Burton (DUP)	Colla McMahon (Sinn Féin)	Robert Mulligan (UUP)	Anthony McGonnell (SDLP)	Sean McGuigan (Sinn Féin)	5 seats 1985–2014
2001	William McIlwrath (DUP)	Seamus Flanagan (Sinn Féin)	Robert Mulligan (UUP)	Anthony McGonnell (SDLP)	Sean McGuigan (Sinn Féin)	5 seats 1985–2014
1997	William McIlwrath (DUP)	Seamus Flanagan (Sinn Féin)	Robert Mulligan (UUP)	Anthony McGonnell (SDLP)	Noel Mulligan (UUP)	5 seats 1985–2014
1993	William McIlwrath (DUP)	Raymond McMahon (Sinn Féin)	Robert Mulligan (UUP)	Anthony McGonnell (SDLP)	Noel Mulligan (UUP)	5 seats 1985–2014
1989	William McIlwrath (DUP)	Raymond McMahon (Sinn Féin)	Samuel Brush (UUP)	Anthony McGonnell (SDLP)	Noel Mulligan (UUP)	5 seats 1985–2014
1985	William McIlwrath (DUP)	Seamus Cassidy (Sinn Féin)	Samuel Brush (UUP)	Anthony McGonnell (SDLP)	Noel Mulligan (UUP)	5 seats 1985–2014

== 2023 Election ==
2019: 2 x DUP, 2 x Sinn Féin, 1 x UUP, 1 x SDLP

2023: 2 x DUP, 2 x Sinn Féin, 1 x UUP, 1 x Ind (Rep)

2019–2023 Change: Ind (Rep) gain from SDLP

Clogher Valley - 6 seats
Party	Candidate	FPv%	Count				
Party	Candidate	FPv%	1	2	3	4	5
DUP	Frances Burton*	15.43%	1,656				
DUP	Mark Robinson*	14.61%	1,568				
Sinn Féin	Gael Gildernew	13.75%	1,475	1,475.91	1,720.91		
Independent	Kevin McElvogue	12.68%	1,361	1,361.56	1,567.56		
Sinn Féin	Eugene McConnell	11.29%	1,212	1,212.07	1,408.07	1,497.32	1,497.36
UUP	Meta Graham*	11.74%	1,260	1,367.59	1,452.36	1,458.31	1,487.83
Sinn Féin	Sean McGuigan*	10.75%	1,154	1,154.21	1,327.35	1,417.45	1,417.47
SDLP	Sharon McAleer*	9.74%	1,045	1,046.82			
Electorate: 15,846 Valid: 10,731 (67.72%) Spoilt: 108 Quota: 1,534 Turnout: 10,839 (68.40%)

== 2019 Election ==
2014: 2 x DUP, 2 x Sinn Féin, 1 x UUP, 1 x SDLP

2019: 2 x DUP, 2 x Sinn Féin, 1 x UUP, 1 x SDLP

2014–2019 Change: No change

Clogher Valley – 6 seats
Party	Candidate	FPv%	Count			
Party	Candidate	FPv%	1	2	3	4
DUP	Frances Burton*	20.79%	1,891			
SDLP	Sharon McAleer*	17.98%	1,635			
Sinn Féin	Sean McGuigan*	16.43%	1,494			
Sinn Féin	Phelim Gildernew*	14.87%	1,352			
DUP	Wills Robinson* †	11.91%	1,083	1,512.97		
UUP	Meta Graham	10.89%	990	1,103.77	1,255.77	1,398.33
UUP	Robert Mulligan*	7.15%	650	682.86	854.86	919.34
Electorate: 14,781 Valid: 9,095 (61.53%) Spoilt: 167 Quota: 1,300 Turnout: 9,262 (62.66%)

== 2014 Election ==
2011: 2 x DUP, 1 x Sinn Féin, 1 x UUP, 1 x SDLP

2014: 2 x Sinn Féin, 2 x DUP, 1 x UUP, 1 x SDLP

2011-2014 Change: Sinn Féin gain due to the addition of one seat

Clogher Valley - 6 seats
Party	Candidate	FPv%	Count				
Party	Candidate	FPv%	1	2	3	4	5
DUP	Frances Burton*	18.57%	1,584				
Sinn Féin	Phelim Gildernew*	17.92%	1,528				
Sinn Féin	Seán McGuigan*	15.13%	1,290				
SDLP	Sharon McAleer	13.50%	1,151	1,153.07	1,453.29		
UUP	Robert Mulligan*	13.09%	1,116	1,163.84	1,166.9	1,182.54	1,210.54
DUP	Wills Robinson*	9.81%	837	1,117.14	1,118.5	1,123.6	1,135.6
UUP	Neil Somerville*	11.98%	1,022	1,052.36	1,053.38	1,056.78	1,068.78
Electorate: 14,030 Valid: 8,528 (60.78%) Spoilt: 137 Quota: 1,219 Turnout: 8,665 (61.76%)

== 2011 Election ==
2005: 2 x Sinn Féin, 1 x DUP, 1 x UUP, 1 x SDLP

2011: 2 x DUP, 1 x Sinn Féin, 1 x UUP, 1 x SDLP

2005-2011 Change: DUP gain from Sinn Féin

Clogher Valley - 5 seats
Party	Candidate	FPv%	Count				
Party	Candidate	FPv%	1	2	3	4	5
SDLP	Anthony McGonnell*	18.31%	1,046				
UUP	Robert Mulligan*	14.91%	852	1,167			
DUP	Frances Burton*	16.57%	947	990			
Sinn Féin	Sean McGuigan*	15.91%	909	911	911.93	979.47	
DUP	Wills Robinson	12.18%	696	716	927.11	929.97	965.85
Sinn Féin	Colla McMahon*	15.30%	874	874	874.93	890.77	891.69
UUP	Winston Duff	6.83%	390				
Electorate: 8,355 Valid: 5,714 (68.39%) Spoilt: 107 Quota: 953 Turnout: 5,821 (69.67%)

== 2005 Election ==
2001: 2 x Sinn Féin, 1 x DUP, 1 x UUP, 1 x SDLP

2005: 2 x Sinn Féin, 1 x DUP, 1 x UUP, 1 x SDLP

2001-2005 Change: No change

Clogher Valley - 5 seats
Party	Candidate	FPv%	Count						
Party	Candidate	FPv%	1	2	3	4	5	6	7
SDLP	Anthony McGonnell*	18.93%	1,134						
Sinn Féin	Sean McGuigan*	13.46%	806	867.44	1,073.44				
UUP	Robert Mulligan*	12.91%	773	784.52	786	1,154			
Sinn Féin	Colla McMahon	12.62%	756	775.04	934.08	939.6	940.76	1,014.47	
DUP	Frances Burton	13.96%	836	836.32	836.32	881.64	959.36	959.36	960.62
DUP	William McIlwrath*	13.98%	837	838.28	840.44	879.56	953.22	953.61	955.56
UUP	Ken Maginnis*	8.00%	479	492.76	495.4				
Sinn Féin	Bronwyn McGahan	6.14%	368	393.12					
Electorate: 7,859 Valid: 5,989 (76.21%) Spoilt: 74 Quota: 999 Turnout: 6,063 (77.15%)

== 2001 Election ==
1997: 2 x UUP, 1 x Sinn Féin, 1 x SDLP, 1 x DUP

2001: 2 x Sinn Féin, 1 x UUP, 1 x SDLP, 1 x DUP

1997-2001 Change: Sinn Féin gain from UUP

Clogher Valley - 5 seats
Party	Candidate	FPv%	Count					
Party	Candidate	FPv%	1	2	3	4	5	6
Sinn Féin	Seamus Flanagan*	17.87%	1,159					
SDLP	Anthony McGonnell*	17.73%	1,150					
DUP	William McIlwrath*	12.58%	816	817	817.07	1,321.07		
UUP	Robert Mulligan*	14.66%	951	992	992	1,028	1,143.5	
Sinn Féin	Sean McGuigan	12.32%	799	903	975.03	975.03	975.69	1,031.4
UUP	Donald Beatty	10.50%	681	690	690.14	733.14	853.26	858.93
DUP	David Robinson	9.08%	589	592	592			
SDLP	Thomas Murphy	5.27%	342					
Electorate: 7,827 Valid: 6,487 (82.88%) Spoilt: 127 Quota: 1,082 Turnout: 6,614 (84.50%)

== 1997 Election ==
1993: 2 x UUP, 1 x SDLP, 1 x Sinn Féin, 1 x DUP

1997: 2 x UUP, 1 x SDLP, 1 x Sinn Féin, 1 x DUP

1993-1997 Change: No change

Clogher Valley - 5 seats
Party	Candidate	FPv%	Count		
Party	Candidate	FPv%	1	2	3
UUP	Noel Mulligan*	18.62%	1,097		
SDLP	Anthony McGonnell*	18.38%	1,083		
Sinn Féin	Seamus Flanagan	17.45%	1,028		
DUP	William McIlwrath*	16.79%	989		
UUP	Robert Mulligan*	14.54%	857	963.9	963.9
SDLP	Margaret Monaghan	8.47%	499	500.7	562.7
Sinn Féin	Brian Kilpatrick	5.75%	339		
Electorate: 7,503 Valid: 5,892 (78.53%) Spoilt: 91 Quota: 983 Turnout: 5,983 (79.74%)

== 1993 Election ==
1989: 2 x UUP, 1 x SDLP, 1 x Sinn Féin, 1 x DUP

1993: 2 x UUP, 1 x SDLP, 1 x Sinn Féin, 1 x DUP

1989-1993 Change: No change

Clogher Valley - 5 seats
Party	Candidate	FPv%	Count		
Party	Candidate	FPv%	1	2	3
Sinn Féin	Raymond McMahon*	19.45%	1,141		
UUP	Noel Mulligan*	18.87%	1,107		
SDLP	Anthony McGonnell*	18.16%	1,065		
DUP	William McIlwrath*	18.07%	1,060		
UUP	Robert Mulligan	14.68%	861	863.73	991.17
SDLP	Bernadette McGirr	10.76%	631	787.39	788.71
Electorate: 7,228 Valid: 5,865 (81.14%) Spoilt: 99 Quota: 978 Turnout: 5,964 (82.51%)

== 1989 Election ==
1985: 2 x UUP, 1 x SDLP, 1 x Sinn Féin, 1 x DUP

1989: 2 x UUP, 1 x SDLP, 1 x Sinn Féin, 1 x DUP

1985-1989 Change: No change

Clogher Valley - 5 seats
Party	Candidate	FPv%	Count		
Party	Candidate	FPv%	1	2	3
UUP	Noel Mulligan*	19.71%	1,171		
UUP	Samuel Brush*	18.80%	1,117		
SDLP	Anthony McGonnell*	17.86%	1,061		
DUP	William McIlwrath*	15.47%	919	1,082.2	
Sinn Féin	Raymond McMahon	16.53%	982	983.28	991.32
SDLP	John Monaghan	11.62%	690	696.08	813.33
Electorate: 7,065 Valid: 5,940 (84.08%) Spoilt: 142 Quota: 991 Turnout: 6,082 (86.09%)

== 1985 Election ==
1985: 2 x UUP, 1 x SDLP, 1 x Sinn Féin, 1 x DUP

Clogher Valley - 5 seats
Party	Candidate	FPv%	Count			
Party	Candidate	FPv%	1	2	3	4
Sinn Féin	Seamus Cassidy*	20.98%	1,280			
SDLP	Anthony McGonnell*	17.13%	1,045			
UUP	Samuel Brush*	16.40%	1,001			
DUP	William McIlwrath*	10.96%	669	669.84	1,144.26	
UUP	Noel Mulligan*	15.29%	933	934.26	949.26	1,050.24
SDLP	John Monaghan	10.03%	612	866.52	871.94	891.94
DUP	Thomas Maxwell	9.21%	562	564.52		
Electorate: 7,003 Valid: 6,102 (87.13%) Spoilt: 93 Quota: 1,018 Turnout: 6,195 (88.46%)
