= Blackwater (District Electoral Area) =

District electoral areas in Dungannon, Northern Ireland

Blackwater DEA (1993-2014) within Dungannon

Blackwater was one of the four district electoral areas in Dungannon, Northern Ireland which existed from 1985 to 2014. The district elected five members to Dungannon and South Tyrone Borough Council, and formed part of the Fermanagh and South Tyrone constituencies for the Northern Ireland Assembly and UK Parliament.

It was created for the 1985 local elections, replacing Dungannon Area C which had existed since 1973, and contained the wards of Aughnacloy, Benburb, Caledon, Killyman and Moy. It was abolished for the 2014 local elections and divided between the Dungannon DEA and the Clogher Valley DEA.

== Councillors ==
Election	Councillor (Party)	Councillor (Party)	Councillor (Party)	Councillor (Party)	Councillor (Party)
2011	Patrick Daly (SDLP)	Phelim Gildernew (Sinn Féin)	Jim Hamilton (UUP)	Samuel Brush (DUP)	Roger Burton (DUP)
2005	Patrick Daly (SDLP)	Phelim Gildernew (Sinn Féin)	Jim Hamilton (UUP)	Samuel Brush (DUP)	Roger Burton (DUP)
2001	Patrick Daly (SDLP)	Phelim Gildernew (Sinn Féin)	Jim Hamilton (UUP)	Derek Irwin (UUP)	Roger Burton (DUP)
1997	Patrick Daly (SDLP)	Jim Brady (UUP)	Jim Hamilton (UUP)	Derek Irwin (UUP)	James Ewing (DUP)
1993	Patrick Daly (SDLP)	Jim Brady (UUP)	Jim Hamilton (UUP)	Derek Irwin (UUP)	James Ewing (DUP)
1989	Patrick Daly (SDLP)	Jim Brady (UUP)	Jim Hamilton (UUP)	Derek Irwin (UUP)	James Ewing (DUP)
1985	Patrick Daly (SDLP)	Jim Brady (UUP)	John Taggart (UUP)	Derek Irwin (UUP)	James Ewing (DUP)

== 2011 Election ==
2005: 2 x DUP, 1 x Sinn Féin, 1 x UUP, 1 x SDLP

2011: 2 x DUP, 1 x Sinn Féin, 1 x UUP, 1 x SDLP

2005-2011 Change: No change

Blackwater - 5 seats
Party	Candidate	FPv%	Count				
Party	Candidate	FPv%	1	2	3	4	5
Sinn Féin	Phelim Gildernew*	20.29%	1,246				
DUP	Roger Burton*	16.54%	1,016	1,016.54	1,089.54		
DUP	Samuel Brush*	16.37%	1,005	1,005.54	1,051.54		
SDLP	Patrick Daly*	10.42%	640	671.86	675.86	675.86	1,010.7
UUP	Jim Hamilton*	12.88%	791	791.72	858.72	882.72	885.7
UUP	Jim Brady	12.72%	781	783.16	822.16	855.16	857.24
Sinn Féin	Brian Murtagh	6.74%	414	592.56	592.56	592.56	
TUV	John Hobson	4.04%	248	248			
Electorate: 8,983 Valid: 6,141 (68.36%) Spoilt: 117 Quota: 1,024 Turnout: 6,258 (69.66%)

== 2005 Election ==
2001: 2 x UUP, 1 x DUP, 1 x Sinn Féin, 1 x SDLP

2005: 2 x DUP, 1 x UUP, 1 x Sinn Féin, 1 x SDLP

2001-2005 Change: DUP gain from UUP

Blackwater - 5 seats
Party	Candidate	FPv%	Count					
Party	Candidate	FPv%	1	2	3	4	5	6
DUP	Roger Burton*	21.22%	1,309					
Sinn Féin	Phelim Gildernew*	17.75%	1,095					
DUP	Samuel Brush	16.13%	995	1,202.27				
UUP	Jim Hamilton*	14.01%	864	884.79	905.13	905.55	1,040.3	
SDLP	Patrick Daly*	12.40%	765	766.05	766.59	782.61	789.87	1,039.87
UUP	Sammy Stewart	7.62%	470	475.67	482.33	482.45	594.88	594.88
Sinn Féin	Josefa Watters	6.66%	411	411	411.18	456.18	458.18	
DUP	Denver Thompson	4.21%	260	298.22	442.94	442.94		
Electorate: 8,116 Valid: 6,169 (76.01%) Spoilt: 97 Quota: 1,029 Turnout: 6,266 (77.21%)

== 2001 Election ==
1997: 3 x UUP, 1 x DUP, 1 x SDLP

2001: 2 x UUP, 1 x DUP, 1 x SDLP, 1 x Sinn Féin

1997-2001 Change: Sinn Féin gain from UUP

Blackwater - 5 seats
Party	Candidate	FPv%	Count					
Party	Candidate	FPv%	1	2	3	4	5	6
Sinn Féin	Phelim Gildernew	15.45%	1,032	1,441				
SDLP	Patrick Daly*	14.20%	948	989	1,229			
UUP	Jim Hamilton*	11.61%	775	775	775	779	1,195	
UUP	Derek Irwin*	11.99%	801	802	804	818	981	1,055.48
DUP	Roger Burton	14.84%	991	991	991	993	1,051	1,052.71
DUP	James Ewing*	14.75%	985	985	986	987	1,016	1,017.71
UUP	Jim Brady*	10.02%	669	670	671	675		
Sinn Féin	Dominic Molloy	7.14%	477					
Electorate: 8,102 Valid: 6,678 (82.42%) Spoilt: 107 Quota: 1,114 Turnout: 6,785 (83.74%)

== 1997 Election ==
1993: 3 x UUP, 1 x DUP, 1 x SDLP

1997: 3 x UUP, 1 x DUP, 1 x SDLP

1993-1997 Change: No change

Blackwater - 5 seats
Party	Candidate	FPv%	Count					
Party	Candidate	FPv%	1	2	3	4	5	6
DUP	James Ewing*	10.05%	596	910	1,284			
UUP	Jim Hamilton*	15.27%	905	955	980	1,066		
UUP	Jim Brady*	13.48%	799	847	877	1,001		
UUP	Derek Irwin*	14.47%	858	864	908	964	1,039.51	
SDLP	Patrick Daly*	16.03%	950	953	953	953	953.91	978.48
Sinn Féin	Michelle Gildernew	15.52%	920	920	920	920	920	920
DUP	Robert McFarland	7.64%	453	478				
DUP	Roger Burton	7.54%	447					
Electorate: 7,802 Valid: 5,928 (75.98%) Spoilt: 80 Quota: 989 Turnout: 6,008 (77.01%)

== 1993 Election ==
1989: 3 x UUP, 1 x DUP, 1 x SDLP

1993: 3 x UUP, 1 x DUP, 1 x SDLP

1989-1993 Change: No change

Blackwater - 5 seats
Party	Candidate	FPv%	Count		
Party	Candidate	FPv%	1	2	3
DUP	James Ewing*	18.58%	1,038		
SDLP	Patrick Daly*	18.20%	1,017		
UUP	Derek Irwin*	14.93%	834	849.3	871.3
UUP	Jim Brady*	14.98%	837	848	864
UUP	Jim Hamilton*	13.76%	769	776.7	788.7
DUP	Robert McFarland	10.01%	559	627	635
Sinn Féin	Anthony Fox	9.54%	533	533	
Electorate: 7,461 Valid: 5,587 (74.88%) Spoilt: 98 Quota: 932 Turnout: 5,685 (76.20%)

== 1989 Election ==
1985: 3 x UUP, 1 x DUP, 1 x SDLP

1989: 3 x UUP, 1 x DUP, 1 x SDLP

1985-1989 Change: No change

Blackwater - 5 seats
Party	Candidate	FPv%	Count	
Party	Candidate	FPv%	1	2
DUP	James Ewing*	23.52%	1,345	
UUP	Derek Irwin*	17.50%	1,001	
SDLP	Patrick Daly*	17.14%	980	
UUP	Jim Hamilton	16.02%	916	1,107.89
UUP	Jim Brady*	15.46%	884	1,078.37
Sinn Féin	Tony Gildernew	10.37%	593	594.55
Electorate: 7,203 Valid: 5,719 (79.40%) Spoilt: 128 Quota: 954 Turnout: 5,847 (81.17%)

== 1985 Election ==
1985: 3 x UUP, 1 x DUP, 1 x SDLP

Blackwater - 5 seats
Party	Candidate	FPv%	Count				
Party	Candidate	FPv%	1	2	3	4	5
DUP	James Ewing*	16.86%	979				
UUP	Derek Irwin*	13.85%	804	1,143			
UUP	Jim Brady*	10.73%	623	688	736.76	1,019.29	
UUP	John Taggart*	10.56%	613	689	808.78	1,109.49	
SDLP	Patrick Daly*	14.61%	848	851	851	852	878
Sinn Féin	Eilish McCabe	13.83%	803	804	804	804	805
DUP	Norman Lockhart	10.61%	616	645	651.36		
UUP	Rodney Mullan	8.96%	520				
Electorate: 7,076 Valid: 5,806 (82.05%) Spoilt: 89 Quota: 968 Turnout: 5,895 (83.31%)
