= Martin McCaughey =

Irish politician and Provisional IRA member (1967–1990)

Dungannon and South Tyrone Borough Councillor
- In office 17 May 1989 – August 1990
- Succeeded by: Francie Molloy
- Constituency: Torrent

Personal details
- Born: Gerard Patrick Martin McCaughey; 24 February 1967 Aughnagar, Galbally, County Tyrone, Northern Ireland
- Died: 9 October 1990 (aged 23) Loughgall, County Armagh, Northern Ireland
- Resting place: Galbally Cemetery
- Party: Sinn Féin

Military service
- Paramilitary: Provisional IRA
- Unit: East Tyrone Brigade
- Battles/wars: The Troubles

Gerard Patrick Martin McCaughey (24 February 1967 – 9 October 1990) was a Sinn Féin councillor and volunteer in the East Tyrone Brigade of the Provisional Irish Republican Army (IRA) from Aughnagar, Galbally, County Tyrone, Northern Ireland. McCaughey was killed by undercover British Army soldiers in County Armagh in October 1990 along with fellow IRA volunteer, Dessie Grew.

== Background ==
McCaughey was the oldest son of Owen and Bridget McCaughey. He was a boyhood friend of several of the "Loughgall Martyrs" including Declan Arthurs, Seamus Donnelly, Tony Gormley and Eugene Kelly, with whom he would travel to local discos and football matches when they were growing up.

McCaughey was a talented Gaelic football player who played for local side Galbally Pearses and was also selected for the Tyrone minor Gaelic team.

== Elected representative ==
McCaughey was elected as a Sinn Féin councillor in the Torrent electoral area for Dungannon and South Tyrone Borough Council during the 1989 election. He was the youngest elected representative on the island of Ireland at the time.

Two months prior to his shooting, McCaughey was disqualified from holding his office on the council as he had failed to appear for a monthly council meeting. After his death the Royal Ulster Constabulary revealed the explanation behind his disappearance. McCaughey had been shot and wounded in a shoot-out with undercover British Army security forces near Cappagh, County Tyrone. McCaughey was then taken south across the Irish border into the Republic of Ireland where he was given hospital treatment and therefore unable to attend the meetings.

Ulster Unionist MP and fellow Dungannon councillor Ken Maginnis alleged that McCaughey had conspired to kill him whilst both sat as councillors.

== Ambush at Loughgall ==
Martin McCaughey was shot dead along with Dessie Grew in an operation by undercover British soldiers. A secret undercover intelligence unit named 14 Intelligence Company, also known as the DET, were monitoring three AK47s at a farm building in a rural part of County Armagh and were aware that the pair were due to remove the guns.

As they were approaching an agricultural shed which was being used to grow mushrooms and also thought to have been an IRA arms dump, as many as 200 shots are believed to have been fired at the two men. British Army reports of the shooting stated that the two men left the shed holding two rifles. Republican sources state the men were unarmed.

McCaughey was buried at Galbally Cemetery in October 1990.

== Events following McCaughey's death ==
The family of McCaughey claimed that he and Grew were ambushed after a stakeout by the SAS. In January 2002, Justice Weatherup, a Northern Ireland High Court Judge ordered that official military documents relating to the shooting should be disclosed. However, Police Service of Northern Ireland Chief Constable Hugh Orde had the ruling overturned on appeal in January 2005.

Fellow Sinn Féin representative, Francie Molloy, replaced McCaughey on Dungannon Council after a by-election was held following McCaughey's death.

There is an ongoing court case relating to the McCaughey's death. In January 2007, the lawyers representing McCaughey and another volunteer, Pearse Jordan, applied to the House of Lords to challenge the details of how the inquests into their deaths will proceed.

McCaughey's father, Owen, sought to compel Chief Constable Hugh Orde to produce key documents including intelligence reports relevant to the shooting and the report of the RUC's investigating officer.

In 2010, a commemorative portrait of McCaughey was unveiled in the mayor's parlour at Dungannon council.

== See also ==
- The Troubles in Loughgall
- Shoot-to-kill policy in Northern Ireland
