= Dungannon (District Electoral Area) =

District electoral area in Northern Ireland

- Mid Ulster District Council DEA constituency

Current constituency
- Created: 1985
- Seats: 5 (1985-)
- Councillors: James Burton (DUP); Clement Cuthbertson (DUP); Karol McQuade (SDLP); Dominic Molloy (SF); Barry Monteith (IND); Deirdre Varsani (SF)

Dungannon DEA within Mid Ulster

Dungannon Town DEA (1993-2014) within Dungannon

Dungannon is one of the seven district electoral areas (DEA) in Mid Ulster, Northern Ireland. The district elects six members to Mid Ulster District Council and contains the wards of Ballysaggart, Killyman, Killymeal, Moy, Moygashel and Mullaghmore. Dungannon forms part of the Fermanagh and South Tyrone constituencies for the Northern Ireland Assembly and UK Parliament.

It was created for the 1985 local elections, replacing Dungannon Area D which had existed since 1973. It was called Dungannon Town until 2014, and originally contained six wards (Ballysaggart, Coolhill, Drumglass, Killymeal, Moygashel and Mullaghmore). For the 2014 local elections it gained Killyman and Moy from the abolished Blackwater DEA.

== Councillors ==
Election	Councillor (Party)	Councillor (Party)	Councillor (Party)	Councillor (Party)	Councillor (Party)	Councillor (Party)
2023	Clement Cuthbertson (DUP)	James Burton (DUP)	Deirdre Varsani (Sinn Féin)	Karol McQuade (SDLP)	Dominic Molloy (Sinn Féin)	Barry Monteith (Independent)/ (Sinn Féin)
July 2019 Defection	Clement Cuthbertson (DUP)	Kim Ashton (DUP)	Walter Cuddy (UUP)	Denise Mullen (Aontú)/ (SDLP)	Dominic Molloy (Sinn Féin)	Barry Monteith (Independent)/ (Sinn Féin)
2019	Clement Cuthbertson (DUP)	Kim Ashton (DUP)	Walter Cuddy (UUP)	Denise Mullen (Aontú)/ (SDLP)	Dominic Molloy (Sinn Féin)	Barry Monteith (Independent)/ (Sinn Féin)
2014	Clement Cuthbertson (DUP)	Kim Ashton (DUP)	Walter Cuddy (UUP)	Denise Mullen (Aontú)/ (SDLP)	Dominic Molloy (Sinn Féin)	Barry Monteith (Independent)/ (Sinn Féin)
2011	Maurice Morrow (DUP)	Kim Ashton (DUP)	Walter Cuddy (UUP)	Bronwyn McGahan (Sinn Féin)	John McLarnon (Sinn Féin)	Barry Monteith (Independent)/ (Sinn Féin)
2009 June Defection	Maurice Morrow (DUP)	Gilbert Greenaway (DUP)/(UUP)	Walter Cuddy (UUP)	Vincent Currie (SDLP)	John McLarnon (Sinn Féin)	Barry Monteith (Independent)/ (Sinn Féin)
2005	Maurice Morrow (DUP)	Gilbert Greenaway (DUP)/(UUP)	Walter Cuddy (UUP)	Vincent Currie (SDLP)	John McLarnon (Sinn Féin)	Barry Monteith (Independent)/ (Sinn Féin)
2001	Maurice Morrow (DUP)	Ken Maginnis (UUP)	Walter Cuddy (UUP)	Vincent Currie (SDLP)	John McLarnon (Sinn Féin)	Barry Monteith (Independent)/ (Sinn Féin)
1997	Maurice Morrow (DUP)	Joan Carson (UUP)	John Reilly (UUP)	Vincent Currie (SDLP)	Vincent Kelly (Sinn Féin)	Gerry Cullen (Democratic Left)/ (Workers' Party)
1993	Maurice Morrow (DUP)	Leslie Holmes (UUP)	William Brown (UUP)	Vincent Currie (SDLP)	Vincent Kelly (Sinn Féin)	Gerry Cullen (Democratic Left)/ (Workers' Party)
1989	Maurice Morrow (DUP)	Ken Maginnis (UUP)	William Brown (UUP)	Vincent Currie (SDLP)	Michael McLoughlin (Independent Nationalist)	Gerry Cullen (Democratic Left)/ (Workers' Party)
1985	Maurice Morrow (DUP)	Ken Maginnis (UUP)	William Brown (UUP)	Vincent Currie (SDLP)	Michael McLoughlin (Independent Nationalist)	Anita Cavlan (Sinn Féin)

== 2023 Election ==
2019: 2 x DUP, 1 x Sinn Féin, 1 x UUP, 1 x SDLP, 1 x Independent (Rep)

2023: 2 x DUP, 2 x Sinn Féin, 1 x SDLP, 1 x Independent (Rep)

2019–2023 Change: Sinn Féin gain from UUP

Dungannon - 6 seats
Party	Candidate	FPv%	Count								
Party	Candidate	FPv%	1	2	3	4	5	6	7	8	9
DUP	Clement Cuthbertson*	21.81%	2,096								
Sinn Féin	Dominic Molloy*	15.81%	1,519								
DUP	James Burton	6.83%	656	1,198.30	1,198.57	1,200.57	1,218.57	1,407.57			
Sinn Féin	Deirdre Varsani	12.58%	1,219	1,219.00	1,325.65	1,347.37	1,363.37	1,366.37	1,414.37		
Independent	Barry Monteith*	12.28%	1,180	1,181.02	1,185.70	1,211.79	1,274.79	1,275.79	1,310.88	1,868.88	
SDLP	Karol McQuade	6.25%	601	604.06	615.67	636.12	684.21	687.89	913.92	979.17	1,139.17
UUP	Ian Irwin	5.48%	527	588.54	588.72	589.72	617.46	781.69	907.47	911.47	913.47
Independent	Marian Vincent	6.54%	628	628.00	632.59	654.68	673.77	675.86	699.86		
Alliance	Claire Hackett	4.90%	471	478.14	480.21	489.30	549.98	556.02			
TUV	Kinley Tenner	3.11%	299	385.70	385.88	396.22	398.90				
Labour Alternative	Gerry Cullen	2.79%	268	273.78	274.05	285.39					
Aontú	Denise Mullen*	1.52%	146	147.36	148.98						
Electorate: 16,325 Valid: 9,610 (58.87%) Spoilt: 201 Quota: 1,373 Turnout: 9,811 (60.10%)

== 2019 Election ==
2014: 2 x DUP, 1 x Sinn Féin, 1 x UUP, 1 x SDLP, 1 x Independent

2019: 2 x DUP, 1 x Sinn Féin, 1 x UUP, 1 x SDLP, 1 x Independent

2014–2019 Change: No change

Dungannon – 6 seats
Party	Candidate	FPv%	Count						
Party	Candidate	FPv%	1	2	3	4	5	6	7
DUP	Clement Cuthbertson*	22.10%	1,833						
Independent	Barry Monteith*	17.05%	1,414						
DUP	Kim Ashton*	9.73%	807	1,362.1					
Sinn Féin	Dominic Molloy*	12.00%	995	996.75	1,016.47	1,016.59	1,053.93	1,207.93	
UUP	Walter Cuddy*	7.32%	607	650.75	652.11	751.47	816.47	830.29	1,239.29
SDLP	Denise Mullen* ‡	8.56%	710	711.75	730.11	731.19	920.04	1,016.49	1,062.14
Sinn Féin	Deirdre Varsani	8.66%	718	718.7	746.41	746.41	762.43	841.12	843.46
UUP	Kim McNeill	5.23%	434	464.8	465.31	537.07	576.37	581.12	
Independent	Niall Bowen	4.16%	345	345.35	496.48	496.96	544.85		
Alliance	Mel Boyle	5.20%	431	433.1	439.73	441.05			
Electorate: 15,366 Valid: 8,294 (53.98%) Spoilt: 335 Quota: 1,185 Turnout: 8,629 (56.16%)

== 2014 Election ==
2011: 2 x DUP, 2 x Sinn Féin, 1 x UUP, 1 x Independent

2014: 2 x DUP, 1 x Sinn Féin, 1 x UUP, 1 x SDLP, 1 x Independent

2011-2014 Change: SDLP gain from Sinn Féin

Dungannon - 6 seats
Party	Candidate	FPv%	Count					
Party	Candidate	FPv%	1	2	3	4	5	6
Independent	Barry Monteith*	19.67%	1,458					
UUP	Walter Cuddy*	14.61%	1,083					
Sinn Féin	Dominic Molloy*	14.10%	1,045	1,223.6				
DUP	Kim Ashton*	11.44%	848	849.14	849.9	859.9	1,029.28	1,289.28
DUP	Clement Cuthbertson*	9.35%	693	695.66	696.8	704.18	821.18	1,017.18
SDLP	Denise Mullen	9.14%	677	779.6	824.44	933.62	958	968.38
Sinn Féin	Dee Varsani*	6.17%	457	550.48	652.7	673.02	673.4	674.4
TUV	Kenny Loughrin	6.69%	496	496.76	497.52	501.9	578.9	
UUP	Winston Duff	5.68%	421	422.14	422.52	460.9		
Alliance	Hannah Su	3.14%	233	251.62	256.94			
Electorate: 14,067 Valid: 7,411 (52.68%) Spoilt: 175 Quota: 1,059 Turnout: 7,586 (53.93%)

== 2011 Election ==
2005: 2 x DUP, 2 x Sinn Féin, 1 x UUP, 1 x SDLP

2011: 2 x DUP, 2 x Sinn Féin, 1 x UUP, 1 x Independent

2005-2011 Change: Sinn Féin gain from SDLP, Independent leaves Sinn Féin

Dungannon Town - 6 seats
Party	Candidate	FPv%	Count								
Party	Candidate	FPv%	1	2	3	4	5	6	7	8	9
Independent	Barry Monteith*	19.86%	1,046								
DUP	Maurice Morrow*	16.40%	864								
Sinn Féin	John McLarnon*	13.16%	693	885.28							
UUP	Walter Cuddy*	13.69%	721	722.9	725.14	740.09	796.09				
DUP	Kim Ashton	7.35%	387	387	387.32	471.04	524.73	533.1	554.27	717.78	721.78
Sinn Féin	Bronwyn McGahan	8.96%	472	519.5	626.7	627.09	628.09	628.09	632.51	633.51	674.5
SDLP	Vincent Currie*	5.90%	311	329.62	343.06	343.06	345.06	346.92	394.62	423.18	647.44
SDLP	Malachy Quinn	4.50%	237	254.48	260.24	260.63	260.63	260.63	309.29	321.42	
UUP	Sammy Stewart	3.23%	170	170	170.32	176.82	210.34	236.38	305.3		
Alliance	Hannah Su	3.91%	206	214.74	216.98	219.06	227.51	234.02			
TUV	Denis Boyd	3.04%	160	160	160.32	162.92					
Electorate: 8,814 Valid: 5,267 (59.76%) Spoilt: 102 Quota: 753 Turnout: 5,369 (60.91%)

== 2005 Election ==
2001: 2 x Sinn Féin, 2 x UUP, 1 x DUP, 1 x SDLP

2005: 2 x Sinn Féin, 2 x DUP, 1 x UUP, 1 x SDLP

2001-2005 Change: DUP gain from UUP

Dungannon Town - 6 seats
Party	Candidate	FPv%	Count				
Party	Candidate	FPv%	1	2	3	4	5
DUP	Maurice Morrow*	18.98%	1,029				
SDLP	Vincent Currie*	16.06%	871				
UUP	Walter Cuddy*	15.40%	835				
Sinn Féin	John McLarnon*	15.07%	817				
DUP	Gilbert Greenaway	9.17%	497	727	728.02	739.15	935.15
Sinn Féin	Barry Monteith*	13.15%	713	713	766.55	767.04	771.44
Sinn Féin	Tony Slevin	6.95%	377	377.5	403.85	404.06	408.54
UUP	Victor McNickle	5.22%	283	305.75	316.63	360.73	
Electorate: 8,281 Valid: 5,422 (65.48%) Spoilt: 80 Quota: 775 Turnout: 5,502 (66.44%)

== 2001 Election ==
1997: 2 x UUP, 1 x Sinn Féin, 1 x DUP, 1 x SDLP, 1 x Democratic Left

2001: 2 x UUP, 2 x Sinn Féin, 1 x DUP, 1 x SDLP

1997-2001 Change: Sinn Féin gain from Democratic Left

Dungannon Town - 6 seats
Party	Candidate	FPv%	Count						
Party	Candidate	FPv%	1	2	3	4	5	6	7
Sinn Féin	John McLarnon	17.67%	1,138						
SDLP	Vincent Currie*	17.24%	1,110						
Sinn Féin	Barry Monteith	12.63%	813	1,010.8					
DUP	Maurice Morrow*	13.56%	873	873.2	874.35	1,123.35			
UUP	Walter Cuddy	13.25%	853	854.2	862.25	919.25	1,033.33		
UUP	Ken Maginnis	11.49%	740	741.2	760.06	785.06	826.46	895.46	899.06
Independent	Gerry Cullen*	8.53%	549	565	719.79	743.02	789.02	820.3	888.1
DUP	Derek Greenaway	5.64%	363	363.2	363.89				
Electorate: 8,742 Valid: 6,439 (73.66%) Spoilt: 91 Quota: 920 Turnout: 6,530 (74.70%)

== 1997 Election ==
1993: 2 x UUP, 1 x Sinn Féin, 1 x DUP, 1 x SDLP, 1 x Democratic Left

1997: 2 x UUP, 1 x Sinn Féin, 1 x DUP, 1 x SDLP, 1 x Democratic Left

1993-1997 Change: No change

Dungannon Town - 6 seats
Party	Candidate	FPv%	Count						
Party	Candidate	FPv%	1	2	3	4	5	6	7
Sinn Féin	Vincent Kelly*	19.26%	1,065						
UUP	Joan Carson	17.00%	940						
DUP	Maurice Morrow*	17.27%	955						
UUP	John Reilly	14.05%	777	777	909.94				
SDLP	Vincent Currie*	11.77%	651	661.92	663.11	678.06	802.06		
Democratic Left	Gerry Cullen*	7.45%	412	420.32	437.83	500.85	518.23	696.77	753.89
Sinn Féin	Edward Devlin	5.26%	291	524.74	524.74	524.97	540.35	582.74	583.25
Alliance	Ephrem Bogues	4.86%	269	276.02	279.93	343.87	359.44		
SDLP	Peggy Devlin	3.07%	170	180.14	180.14	186.81			
Electorate: 8,715 Valid: 5,530 (63.45%) Spoilt: 79 Quota: 791 Turnout: 5,609 (64.36%)

== 1993 Election ==
1989: 2 x UUP, 1 x DUP, 1 x SDLP, 1 x Workers' Party, 1 x Independent Nationalist

1993: 2 x UUP, 1 x DUP, 1 x SDLP, 1 x Sinn Féin, 1 x Democratic Left

1989-1993 Change: Sinn Féin gain from Independent Nationalist, Workers' Party joins Democratic Left

Dungannon Town - 6 seats
Party	Candidate	FPv%	Count						
Party	Candidate	FPv%	1	2	3	4	5	6	7
Sinn Féin	Vincent Kelly	20.35%	1,180						
DUP	Maurice Morrow*	15.61%	905						
UUP	Leslie Holmes	13.82%	801	801.65	876.65				
UUP	William Brown*	11.54%	669	669	691.65	714.87	725.79	1,129.79	
SDLP	Vincent Currie*	10.16%	589	641	746.7	747.06	748.88	771.43	834.43
Democratic Left	Gerry Cullen*	7.88%	457	524.6	566.8	579.76	589.77	642.03	708.03
Ind. Nationalist	Michael McLoughlin*	7.17%	416	613.6	631.55	632.09	632.09	644.03	670.03
UUP	Ken Maginnis*	8.31%	482	489.15	529.15	564.25	588.82		
Ind. Unionist	Simon Dilworth	3.00%	174	174.65					
SDLP	Peggy Devlin	2.16%	125	148.4					
Electorate: 8,451 Valid: 5,798 (68.61%) Spoilt: 75 Quota: 829 Turnout: 5,873 (69.49%)

== 1989 Election ==
1985: 2 x UUP, 1 x DUP, 1 x SDLP, 1 x Sinn Féin, 1 x Independent Nationalist

1989: 2 x UUP, 1 x DUP, 1 x SDLP, 1 x Workers' Party, 1 x Independent Nationalist

1985-1989 Change: Workers' Party gain from Sinn Féin

Dungannon Town - 6 seats
Party	Candidate	FPv%	Count						
Party	Candidate	FPv%	1	2	3	4	5	6	7
UUP	Ken Maginnis*	26.86%	1,479						
UUP	William Brown*	15.87%	874						
DUP	Maurice Morrow*	14.44%	795						
SDLP	Vincent Currie*	10.35%	570	747	880				
Ind. Nationalist	Michael McLoughlin*	10.90%	600	738	750	827.6			
Workers' Party	Gerry Cullen	5.01%	276	595	626	640.4	725.52	765.84	771.16
Sinn Féin	Peter Corrigan	13.75%	757	759	760	760.8	761.94	761.94	762
SDLP	Peggy Devlin	2.83%	156	197					
Electorate: 8,169 Valid: 5,507 (67.41%) Spoilt: 120 Quota: 787 Turnout: 5,627 (68.88%)

== 1985 Election ==
1985: 2 x UUP, 1 x Sinn Féin, 1 x DUP, 1 x SDLP, 1 x Independent Nationalist

Dungannon Town - 6 seats
Party	Candidate	FPv%	Count					
Party	Candidate	FPv%	1	2	3	4	5	6
UUP	Ken Maginnis*	21.99%	1,329					
DUP	Maurice Morrow*	17.97%	1,086					
Ind. Nationalist	Michael McLoughlin*	15.87%	959					
UUP	William Brown*	14.97%	905					
SDLP	Vincent Currie	7.02%	424	813	984			
Sinn Féin	Anita Cavlan	10.62%	642	644	646	648.79	663.79	737.28
Sinn Féin	Martin McNulty	8.17%	494	494	495	495.93	510.63	570.07
SDLP	Terence Foley	3.39%	205	259	286	402.25	459.65	
Electorate: 8,157 Valid: 6,044 (74.10%) Spoilt: 124 Quota: 864 Turnout: 6,168 (75.62%)
