= Linda Dillon =

Irish politician

Linda Dillon MLA
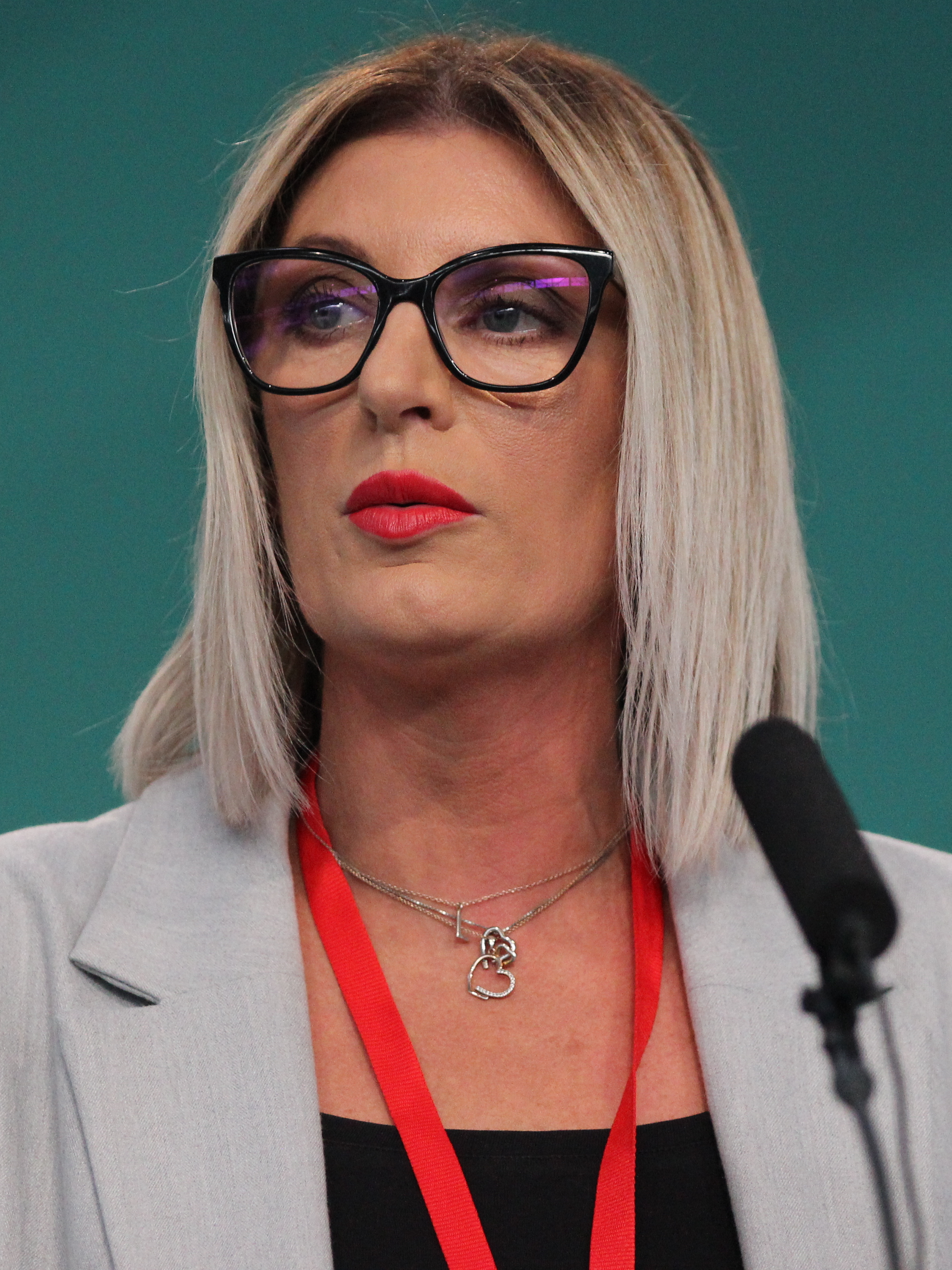
- Dillon in 2023

Member of the Legislative Assembly for Mid Ulster
- Incumbent
- Assumed office 5 May 2016
- Preceded by: Martin McGuinness

Chair of Mid-Ulster District Council
- In office April 2015 – May 2016

Member of Mid-Ulster District Council
- In office 22 May 2014 – 5 May 2016
- DEA: Torrent
- Preceded by: Council established
- Succeeded by: Niamh Doris

Personal details
- Born: 5 August 1978 (age 47) South Armagh, Northern Ireland
- Party: Sinn Féin
- Spouse: Gerard
- Children: 1
- Profession: Politician
- Website: Official website

Linda Dillon (Irish: Líonda Diolún; born 5 August 1978) is an Irish Sinn Féin politician from Northern Ireland, serving as a Member of the Legislative Assembly (MLA) for Mid Ulster since 2016.

== Political career ==
Originally elected as a Mid-Ulster councillor for the Torrent DEA (topping the poll with 14.8% of the total valid votes), she served as the inaugural chairperson of Mid-Ulster District Council since its inception in April 2015 and also sat on the Council's Development Committee until being elected to Stormont in May 2016.

As Martin McGuinness elected to run in the Foyle constituency in the 2016 Assembly election, Linda was then selected to replace him as a candidate in the Mid-Ulster constituency. She was elected with her two other party colleagues (Ian Milne and Michelle O'Neill) on the first count, amassing 5,833 votes (14.3%).

Northern Ireland Assembly
Preceded by Martin McGuinness	MLA for Mid-Ulster; 2016–present	Incumbent
