= Joan Carson =

Member of the Legislative Assembly for Fermanagh & South Tyrone
- In office 25 June 1998 – 26 November 2003
- Preceded by: Constituency created
- Succeeded by: Arlene Foster

Member of Dungannon and South Tyrone Borough Council
- In office 21 May 1997 – 7 June 2001
- Preceded by: Leslie Holmes
- Succeeded by: Ken Maginnis
- Constituency: Dungannon Town

Personal details
- Born: 29 January 1935 (age 91) Enniskillen, Northern Ireland
- Party: Ulster Unionist Party
- Education: Stranmillis University College
- Profession: Teacher

Joan Carson (born 29 January 1935) is a former Ulster Unionist Party (UUP) politician in Northern Ireland who was a Member of the Legislative Assembly (MLA) for Fermanagh and South Tyrone from 1998 to 2003.

== Background ==
Born in Enniskillen, Carson studied at Enniskillen Collegiate School and Stranmillis College before working as a teacher. In 1997 she was elected to Dungannon Borough Council for the Ulster Unionist Party (UUP), and at the 1998 Northern Ireland Assembly election, she was elected in Fermanagh and South Tyrone.

Carson stood down from her council seat in 2001 and from her Assembly seat at the 2003 election. She is currently a UUP party officer.

Northern Ireland Assembly
New assembly	MLA for Fermanagh & South Tyrone; 1998–2003	Succeeded by Arlene Foster
