= Mid Ulster District Council =

Local authority in Northern Ireland

Mid Ulster District Council Comhairle Ceantair Lár Uladh Mid Ulstèr Airts Cooncil

Type
- Type: District council of Mid Ulster District

History
- Founded: 1 April 2015
- Preceded by: Cookstown District Council; Dungannon and South Tyrone Borough Council; Magherafelt District Council

Leadership
- Chair: Councillor Deirdre Varsani, Sinn Féin
- Deputy Chair: Councillor Eva Cahoon, Democratic Unionist Party

Structure
- Seats: 40
- Graph of the party split among 40 seats.
- Political groups: All parties (40) Sinn Féin (19) DUP (10) SDLP (5) UUP (2) Independent (4)
- Length of term: 4 years

Elections
- Voting system: Single transferable vote
- Last election: 18 May 2023
- Next election: 6 May 2027

Website
- http://www.midulstercouncil.org/

Mid Ulster District Council (Irish: Comhairle Ceantair Lár Uladh; Ulster-Scots: Mid Ulstèr Airts Cooncil) is a local authority that was established on 1 April 2015. It replaced Cookstown District Council, Dungannon and South Tyrone Borough Council and Magherafelt District Council. The first elections to the authority took place on 22 May 2014 and it acted as a shadow authority, prior to the creation of the Mid Ulster district on 1 April 2015.

== Chairpersonship ==
=== Chair ===
| From | To | Name | Party |
|---|---|---|---|
| 2015 | 2016 | Linda Dillon | Sinn Féin |
| 2016 | 2017 | Trevor Wilson | UUP |
| 2017 | 2018 | Kim Ashton | DUP |
| 2018 | 2019 | Seán McPeake | Sinn Féin |
| 2019 | 2020 | Martin Kearney | SDLP |
| 2020 | 2021 | Cathal Mallaghan | Sinn Féin |
| 2021 | 2022 | Paul McLean | DUP |
| 2022 | 2023 | Cora Corry | Sinn Féin |
| 2023 | 2024 | Dominic Molloy | Sinn Féin |
| 2024 | 2025 | Eugene McConnell | Sinn Féin |
| 2025 | 2026 | Frances Burton | DUP |
| 2026 | Present | Deirdre Varsani | Sinn Féin |

=== Vice Chair ===
| From | To | Name | Party |
|---|---|---|---|
| 2015 | 2016 | Kim Ashton | DUP |
| 2016 | 2017 | Sharon McAleer | SDLP |
| 2017 | 2018 | Mark Glasgow | UUP |
| 2018 | 2019 | Frances Burton | DUP |
| 2019 | 2020 | Clement Cuthbertson | DUP |
| 2020 | 2021 | Meta Graham | UUP |
| 2021 | 2022 | Christine McFlynn | SDLP |
| 2022 | 2023 | Frances Burton | DUP |
| 2023 | 2024 | Meta Graham | UUP |
| 2024 | 2025 | Wesley Brown | DUP |
| 2025 | 2026 | Denise Johnson | SDLP |
| 2026 | Present | Eva Cahoon | DUP |

== Councillors ==
For the purpose of elections the council is divided into seven district electoral areas (DEA):

| Area | Seats |
|---|---|
| Carntogher | 5 |
| Clogher Valley | 6 |
| Cookstown | 7 |
| Dungannon | 6 |
| Magherafelt | 5 |
| Moyola | 5 |
| Torrent | 6 |

=== Seat summary ===
| Party | Elected 2014 | Elected 2019 | Elected 2023 |
|---|---|---|---|
| Sinn Féin | 18 | 17 | 19 |
| DUP | 8 | 9 | 11 |
| UUP | 7 | 6 | 2 |
| SDLP | 6 | 6 | 5 |
| Independents | 1 | 2 | 3 |

=== Councillors by electoral area ===
Borders of the DEAs within Mid Ulster

Current council members
| District electoral area | Name | Party |
|---|---|---|
| Carntogher | Brian McGuigan | Sinn Féin |
| Carntogher | Sean McPeake | Sinn Féin |
| Carntogher | Paddy Kelly | Sinn Féin |
| Carntogher | Córa Corry | Sinn Féin |
| Carntogher | Kyle Black | DUP |
| Clogher Valley | Frances Burton | DUP |
| Clogher Valley | Mark Robinson | DUP |
| Clogher Valley | Gael Gildernew | Sinn Féin |
| Clogher Valley | Kevin McElvogue | Independent |
| Clogher Valley | Eugene McConnell | Sinn Féin |
| Clogher Valley | Meta Graham | UUP |
| Cookstown | Donna Mullin | Sinn Féin |
| Cookstown | John McNamee | Sinn Féin |
| Cookstown | Gavin Bell | Sinn Féin |
| Cookstown | Kerri Martin | SDLP |
| Cookstown | Wilbert Buchanan | DUP |
| Cookstown | Trevor Wilson | UUP |
| Cookstown | Eva Cahoon | DUP |
| Dungannon | Clement Cuthbertson | Ind. Unionist |
| Dungannon | Dominic Molloy | Sinn Féin |
| Dungannon | James Burton | DUP |
| Dungannon | Deirdre Varsani | Sinn Féin |
| Dungannon | Barry Monteith | Independent |
| Dungannon | Karol McQuade | SDLP |
| Magherafelt | Darren Totten | Sinn Féin |
| Magherafelt | Sean Clarke | Sinn Féin |
| Magherafelt | Christine McFlynn | SDLP |
| Magherafelt | Paul McLean | DUP |
| Magherafelt | Wesley Brown | DUP |
| Moyola | Ian Milne | Sinn Féin |
| Moyola | Jolene Groogan | Sinn Féin |
| Moyola | Anne Forde | DUP |
| Moyola | Donal McPeake | Sinn Féin |
| Moyola | Denise Johnston | SDLP |
| Torrent | Eimear Carney | Sinn Féin |
| Torrent | Niall McAleer | Sinn Féin |
| Torrent | Dan Kerr | Independent |
| Torrent | Jonathan Buchanan | DUP |
| Torrent | Malachy Quinn | SDLP |
| Torrent | Nuala McLernon | Sinn Féin |

== Premises ==
The council uses the three sets of administrative offices inherited from its three predecessors, at Burn Road in Cookstown, at Circular Road in Dungannon, and at Ballyronan Road in Magherafelt.

== Population ==
The area covered by the Council has a population of 138,590 residents according to the 2011 Northern Ireland census.
