= Torrent (District Electoral Area) =

District electoral area in Northern Ireland

- Mid Ulster District Council DEA constituency

Current constituency
- Created: 1985
- Seats: 6 (1985-)
- Councillors: Jonathan Buchanan (DUP); Eimear Carney (SF); Dan Kerr (IND); Niall McAleer (SF); Nuala McLernon (SF); Malachy Quinn (SDLP)

Torrent DEA within Mid Ulster

Torrent DEA (1993-2014) within Dungannon

Torrent is one of the seven district electoral areas (DEA) in Mid Ulster, Northern Ireland. The district elects six members to Mid Ulster District Council and contains the wards of Ardboe, Coalisland North, Coalisland South, Donaghmore, Stewartstown and Washing Bay. Torrent forms part of the Mid Ulster constituencies for the Northern Ireland Assembly and UK Parliament.

It was created for the 1985 local elections, replacing Dungannon Area B which had existed since 1973, where it contained six wards (Altmore, Coalisland North, Coalisland South, Coalisand West and Newmills, Donaghmore and Washing Bay).

== Councillors ==
Election	Councillor (Party)	Councillor (Party)	Councillor (Party)	Councillor (Party)	Councillor (Party)	Councillor (Party)
2023	Niall McAleer (Sinn Féin)	Eimear Carney (Sinn Féin)	Nuala McLernon (Sinn Féin)	Dan Kerr (Independent)	Malachy Quinn (SDLP)	Jonathan Buchanan (DUP)
February 2020 Co-Option	Niall McAleer (Sinn Féin)	Joe O'Neill (Sinn Féin)	Niamh Doris (Sinn Féin)	Dan Kerr (Independent)	Malachy Quinn (SDLP)	Robert Colvin (UUP)
2019	Ronan McGinley (Sinn Féin)	Joe O'Neill (Sinn Féin)	Niamh Doris (Sinn Féin)	Dan Kerr (Independent)	Malachy Quinn (SDLP)	Robert Colvin (UUP)
January 2019 Co-Option	Ronan McGinley (Sinn Féin)	Joe O'Neill (Sinn Féin)	Niamh Doris (Sinn Féin)	Mickey Gillespie (Sinn Féin)	Malachy Quinn (SDLP)	Robert Colvin (UUP)
May 2016 Co-Option	Ronan McGinley (Sinn Féin)	Joe O'Neill (Sinn Féin)	Niamh Doris (Sinn Féin)	Mickey Gillespie (Sinn Féin)	Malachy Quinn (SDLP)	Kenneth Reid (UUP)
2014	Ronan McGinley (Sinn Féin)	Joe O'Neill (Sinn Féin)	Linda Dillon (Sinn Féin)	Mickey Gillespie (Sinn Féin)	Malachy Quinn (SDLP)	Kenneth Reid (UUP)
2011	Desmond Donnelly (Sinn Féin)	Joe O'Neill (Sinn Féin)	Pádraig Quinn (Sinn Féin)	Mickey Gillespie (Sinn Féin)	Jim Cavanagh (SDLP)	Kenneth Reid (UUP)
2005	Desmond Donnelly (Sinn Féin)	Francie Molloy (Sinn Féin)	Michelle O'Neill (Sinn Féin)	Mickey Gillespie (Sinn Féin)	Jim Cavanagh (SDLP)	Norman Badger (UUP)
2001	Desmond Donnelly (Sinn Féin)	Francie Molloy (Sinn Féin)	Jim Canning (Independent Nationalist)	Mickey Gillespie (Sinn Féin)	Jim Cavanagh (SDLP)	Norman Badger (UUP)
1997	Brendan Doris (Sinn Féin)	Francie Molloy (Sinn Féin)	Jim Canning (Independent Nationalist)	Mickey Gillespie (Sinn Féin)	Jim Cavanagh (SDLP)	Norman Badger (UUP)
1993	Brendan Doris (Sinn Féin)	Francie Molloy (Sinn Féin)	Jim Canning (Independent Nationalist)	Denise Sutton (Sinn Féin)	Jim Cavanagh (SDLP)	Norman Badger (UUP)
1989	Brendan Doris (Sinn Féin)	Martin McCaughey (Sinn Féin)	Jim Canning (Independent Nationalist)	Angela Donnelly (SDLP)	Jim Cavanagh (SDLP)	Thomas Kempton (UUP)
1985	Brian Duffin (Sinn Féin)	Francie Molloy (Sinn Féin)	Jim Canning (Independent Nationalist)	Patrick McGlinchey (SDLP)	Jim Cavanagh (SDLP)	Thomas Kempton (UUP)

== 2023 Election ==
2019: 3 x Sinn Féin, 1 x SDLP, 1 x UUP, 1 x Independent (Rep)

2023: 3 x Sinn Féin, 1 x SDLP, 1 x DUP, 1 x Independent (Rep)

2019–2023 Change: DUP gain from UUP

Torrent - 6 seats
Party	Candidate	FPv%	Count							
Party	Candidate	FPv%	1	2	3	4	5	6	7	8
Sinn Féin	Eimear Carney	15.78%	1,678							
Sinn Féin	Niall McAleer*	15.67%	1,666							
Independent	Dan Kerr*	13.12%	1,395	1,431.00	1,443.69	1,994.96				
DUP	Jonathan Buchanan	11.00%	1,170	1,181.00	1,181.09	1,182.09	1,186.09	1,823.09		
SDLP	Malachy Quinn*	9.04%	961	1,084.00	1,093.63	1,113.90	1,170.90	1,244.90	1,434.90	1,448.42
Sinn Féin	Nuala McLernon	10.79%	1,147	1,161.00	1,182.87	1,195.05	1,243.05	1,243.05	1,245.05	1,349.13
Sinn Féin	Paul Kelly	9.37%	996	1,012.00	1,117.30	1,155.57	1,288.57	1,291.66	1,296.66	1,310.34
UUP	Robert Colvin*	6.72%	714	777.00	777.09	777.09	777.09			
Independent	Teresa Quinn	5.85%	622	628.00	628.90					
Alliance	Simon Graham	2.67%	284							
Electorate: 16,464 Valid: 10,633 (64.58%) Spoilt: 173 Quota: 1,520 Turnout: 10,806 (65.63%)

== 2019 Election ==
2014: 4 x Sinn Féin, 1 x SDLP, 1 x UUP

2019: 3 x Sinn Féin, 1 x SDLP, 1 x UUP, 1 x Independent

2014–2019 Change: Independent gain from Sinn Féin

Torrent – 6 seats
Party	Candidate	FPv%	Count				
Party	Candidate	FPv%	1	2	3	4	5
SDLP	Malachy Quinn*	17.93%	1,631				
Independent	Dan Kerr	16.76%	1,525				
UUP	Robert Colvin*	11.19%	1,018	1,052.41	1,055.91	1,914.91	
Sinn Féin	Ronan McGinley* †	12.89%	1,173	1,254.84	1,282.59	1,283.84	1,286.84
Sinn Féin	Joe O'Neill*	10.93%	994	1,099.09	1,162.59	1,164.9	1,175.9
Sinn Féin	Niamh Doris*	11.01%	1,002	1,066.48	1,175.73	1,157.04	1,170.04
Sinn Féin	Mickey Gillespie*	9.41%	856	894.75	931.25	933.25	937.25
DUP	Ian McCrea	9.88%	899	903.96	905.21		
Electorate: 15,458 Valid: 9,098 (58.86%) Spoilt: 138 Quota: 1,300 Turnout: 9,236 (59.75%)

== 2014 Election ==
2011: 4 x Sinn Féin, 1 x SDLP, 1 x UUP

2014: 4 x Sinn Féin, 1 x SDLP, 1 x UUP

2011-2014 Change: No change

Torrent - 6 seats
Party	Candidate	FPv%	Count				
Party	Candidate	FPv%	1	2	3	4	5
Sinn Féin	Linda Dillon †	14.81%	1,218				
Sinn Féin	Joe O'Neill*	13.95%	1,147	1,310			
SDLP	Malachy Quinn	8.91%	733	822	846	847.89	1,361.89
Sinn Féin	Ronan McGinley	11.02%	906	958	982	985.36	1,139.51
UUP	Kenneth Reid* †	13.42%	1,104	1,106	1,109	1,109.09	1,117.12
Sinn Féin	Mickey Gillespie*	10.21%	840	936	1,003	1,031.47	1,069.47
DUP	Keith Buchanan	10.35%	851	852	852	852	856
SDLP	Deirdre Mayo*	9.23%	759	800	804	805.05	
Independent	Feargal O'Donnell	8.11%	667				
Electorate: 14,672 Valid: 8,225 (56.06%) Spoilt: 138 Quota: 1,176 Turnout: 8,363 (57.0%)

== 2011 Election ==
2005: 4 x Sinn Féin, 1 x SDLP, 1 x UUP

2011: 4 x Sinn Féin, 1 x SDLP, 1 x UUP

2005-2011 Change: No change

Torrent - 6 seats
Party	Candidate	FPv%	Count						
Party	Candidate	FPv%	1	2	3	4	5	6	7
Sinn Féin	Michael Gillespie*	16.53%	1,152						
SDLP	Jim Cavanagh*	16.10%	1,122						
Sinn Féin	Joe O'Neill*	15.07%	1,050						
UUP	Kenneth Reid	11.74%	818	818.42	820.76	1,131.76			
Sinn Féin	Desmond Donnelly*	11.69%	815	838.38	871.14	872.4	874.4	908.95	1,032.95
Sinn Féin	Pádraig Quinn	9.69%	675	800.44	812.92	813.92	813.92	825.97	971.93
Independent	Patricia Campbell	7.32%	510	514.34	535.4	540.53	577.53	578.93	722.97
Independent	James Walshe	6.93%	483	484.68	532.13	539.26	575.26	578.11	
DUP	Johnny Chartres	4.94%	344	344	345.04				
Electorate: 11,130 Valid: 6,969 (62.61%) Spoilt: 104 Quota: 996 Turnout: 7,073 (63.55%)

== 2005 Election ==
2001: 3 x Sinn Féin, 1 x SDLP, 1 x UUP, 1 x Independent

2005: 4 x Sinn Féin, 1 x SDLP, 1 x UUP

2001-2005 Change: Sinn Féin gain from Independent

Torrent - 6 seats
Party	Candidate	FPv%	Count					
Party	Candidate	FPv%	1	2	3	4	5	6
Sinn Féin	Michael Gillespie*	18.24%	1,392					
Sinn Féin	Michelle O'Neill	16.64%	1,270					
Sinn Féin	Francie Molloy*	15.37%	1,173					
Sinn Féin	Desmond Donnelly*	10.68%	815	1,090.44	1,090.66	1,247.74		
UUP	Norman Badger*	9.59%	732	732.22	1,076.22	1,076.5	1,076.5	1,077.88
SDLP	Jim Cavanagh*	12.53%	956	968.32	972.32	978.2	990.1	1,025.29
Independent	Jim Canning*	12.10%	923	927.84	932.84	941.94	958.88	1,002.81
DUP	Robert McFarland	4.84%	369	369.44				
Electorate: 10,410 Valid: 7,630 (73.29%) Spoilt: 90 Quota: 1,091 Turnout: 7,720 (74.16%)

== 2001 Election ==
1997: 3 x Sinn Féin, 1 x SDLP, 1 x UUP, 1 x Independent Nationalist

2001: 3 x Sinn Féin, 1 x SDLP, 1 x UUP, 1 x Independent

1997-2001 Change: Independent Nationalist becomes Independent

Torrent - 6 seats
Party	Candidate	FPv%	Count						
Party	Candidate	FPv%	1	2	3	4	5	6	7
Sinn Féin	Francie Molloy*	16.60%	1,393						
Sinn Féin	Michael Gillespie*	15.92%	1,336						
SDLP	Jim Cavanagh*	15.18%	1,274						
Independent	Jim Canning*	14.83%	1,244						
UUP	Norman Badger*	10.85%	910	1,198	1,198.6	1,198.7	1,207.94		
Sinn Féin	Desmond Donnelly	11.25%	944	944	1,076.6	1,098.9	1,155.99	1,176.44	1,177.76
Sinn Féin	Brendan Doris*	11.74%	985	985	1,043.8	1,146.6	1,152.65	1,170.05	1,170.6
DUP	Robert McFarland	3.62%	304						
Electorate: 10,314 Valid: 8,390 (81.35%) Spoilt: 172 Quota: 1,199 Turnout: 8,562 (83.01%)

== 1997 Election ==
1993: 3 x Sinn Féin, 1 x SDLP, 1 x UUP, 1 x Independent Nationalist

1997: 3 x Sinn Féin, 1 x SDLP, 1 x UUP, 1 x Independent Nationalist

1993-1997 Change: No change

Torrent - 6 seats
Party	Candidate	FPv%	Count			
Party	Candidate	FPv%	1	2	3	4
Sinn Féin	Francie Molloy*	19.41%	1,407			
UUP	Norman Badger*	16.72%	1,212			
Ind. Nationalist	Jim Canning*	16.32%	1,183			
Sinn Féin	Michael Gillespie	14.03%	1,017	1,045.6		
SDLP	Jim Cavanagh*	11.48%	832	844.48	1,078.48	
Sinn Féin	Brendan Doris*	11.34%	822	955.64	970.98	990.98
Sinn Féin	Jim O'Donnell	6.80%	493	670.58	687.88	695.88
SDLP	Joseph Gervin	3.90%	283	288.46		
Electorate: 9,730 Valid: 7,249 (74.50%) Spoilt: 159 Quota: 1,036 Turnout: 7,408 (76.14%)

== 1993 Election ==
1989: 2 x Sinn Féin, 2 x SDLP, 1 x UUP, 1 x Independent Nationalist

1993: 3 x Sinn Féin, 1 x SDLP, 1 x UUP, 1 x Independent Nationalist

1989-1993 Change: Sinn Féin gain from SDLP

Torrent - 6 seats
Party	Candidate	FPv%	Count					
Party	Candidate	FPv%	1	2	3	4	5	6
Sinn Féin	Francie Molloy	21.52%	1,482					
UUP	Norman Badger	19.17%	1,320					
Ind. Nationalist	Jim Canning*	15.90%	1,095					
Sinn Féin	Brendan Doris*	10.33%	711	1,138.32				
SDLP	Jim Cavanagh*	11.98%	825	835.44	982.8	985.14		
Sinn Féin	Denise Sutton	11.20%	771	810.6	811.56	955.99	962.49	978.88
SDLP	Angela Donnelly*	4.65%	320	323.6	471.92	472.05	516.25	817.95
SDLP	Joe Gervin	5.26%	362	368.12	403.16	404.85	462.44	
Electorate: 9,047 Valid: 6,886 (76.11%) Spoilt: 166 Quota: 984 Turnout: 7,052 (77.95%)

== 1989 Election ==
1985: 2 x Sinn Féin, 2 x SDLP, 1 x UUP, 1 x Independent Nationalist

1989: 2 x Sinn Féin, 2 x SDLP, 1 x UUP, 1 x Independent Nationalist

1985-1989 Change: No change

Torrent - 6 seats
Party	Candidate	FPv%	Count					
Party	Candidate	FPv%	1	2	3	4	5	6
Ind. Nationalist	Jim Canning*	26.02%	1,626					
UUP	Thomas Kempton*	21.33%	1,333					
SDLP	Jim Cavanagh*	10.93%	683	1,148.01				
SDLP	Angela Donnelly	5.71%	357	383.95	733.11	835.48	984.48	
Sinn Féin	Brendan Doris	12.13%	758	835.91	836.77	848.66	878.44	884.44
Sinn Féin	Martin McCaughey	11.66%	729	737.33	740.77	743.09	752.53	753.53
Sinn Féin	John Corr	8.80%	550	617.62	624.5	656.4	688.57	697.57
SDLP	Bridie O'Donnell	3.42%	214	294.85	373.11	476.64		
Electorate: 8,643 Valid: 6,250 (72.31%) Spoilt: 222 Quota: 893 Turnout: 6,472 (74.88%)

== 1985 Election ==
1985: 2 x Sinn Féin, 2 x SDLP, 1 x UUP, 1 x Independent Nationalist

Torrent - 6 seats
Party	Candidate	FPv%	Count					
Party	Candidate	FPv%	1	2	3	4	5	6
UUP	Thomas Kempton*	17.27%	1,120					
Sinn Féin	Francie Molloy	16.64%	1,079					
Ind. Nationalist	Jim Canning*	13.14%	852	853.44	923.44	935.2		
Sinn Féin	Brian Duffin	10.07%	653	653	668	785.6	786.6	821.3
SDLP	Patrick McGlinchey*	8.80%	571	572.26	590.26	594.04	628.6	789.4
SDLP	Jim Cavanagh	9.07%	588	588.36	609.36	610.48	648	773.92
Sinn Féin	Frances Donaghy	9.88%	641	641	644	653.38	653.38	763.08
Ind. Nationalist	Owen Nugent*	8.51%	552	553.08	561.08	564.16	596.38	
DUP	Edith White	4.47%	290	478.64	479.64	479.64		
Ind. Republican	John Corr*	2.16%	140	140				
Electorate: 8,203 Valid: 6,486 (79.07%) Spoilt: 174 Quota: 927 Turnout: 6,660 (81.19%)
