= Michelle Gildernew =

Irish politician (born 1970)

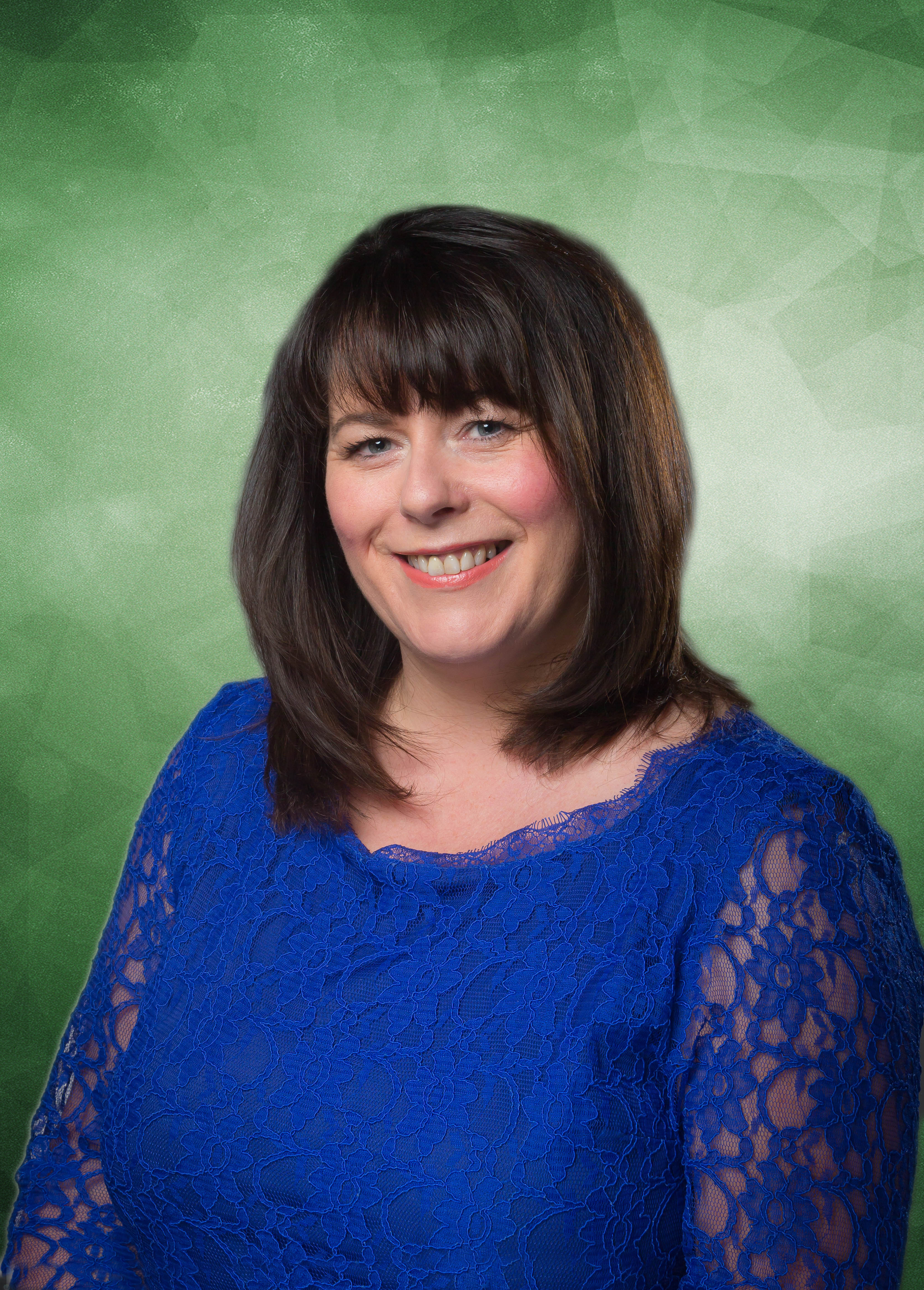
- Official portrait, 2014

Minister for Agriculture and Rural Development
- In office 8 May 2007 – 4 May 2011
- First Minister: Ian Paisley; Peter Robinson
- Preceded by: Bríd Rodgers
- Succeeded by: Michelle O'Neill

Member of Parliament for Fermanagh and South Tyrone
- In office 8 June 2017 – 30 May 2024
- Preceded by: Tom Elliot
- Succeeded by: Pat Cullen
- In office 7 June 2001 – 30 March 2015
- Preceded by: Ken Maginnis
- Succeeded by: Tom Elliott

Member of the Northern Ireland Assembly for Fermanagh and South Tyrone
- In office 5 May 2016 – 9 June 2017
- Preceded by: Bronwyn McGahan
- Succeeded by: Colm Gildernew
- In office 25 June 1998 – 1 July 2012
- Preceded by: Position established
- Succeeded by: Bronwyn McGahan

Personal details
- Born: 28 March 1970 (age 56) Dungannon, Northern Ireland
- Party: Sinn Féin
- Spouse: Jimmy Taggart
- Children: 3
- Relatives: Colm Gildernew (brother)
- Education: University of Ulster

Michelle Angela Gildernew (born 28 March 1970) is an Irish former Sinn Féin politician from County Tyrone, Northern Ireland. She was the Member of Parliament (MP) for Fermanagh and South Tyrone from 2017 to 2024, after previously holding the seat from 2001 to 2015.

Gildernew is a former Minister for Agriculture and Rural Development in the Northern Ireland Executive. She was the MP for Fermanagh and South Tyrone from 2001 to 2015, and was a Member of the Northern Ireland Assembly (MLA) for the Assembly constituency of Fermanagh and South Tyrone from June 1998 to July 2012. She was re-elected to the Assembly in 2016 and 2017. In 2017 she reclaimed her Westminster seat from Tom Elliott of the Ulster Unionist Party. In 2019, she was re-elected with the smallest majority of any constituency in the UK, a margin of just 57 votes.

Gildernew was appointed as Sinn Féin's health spokesperson, and was a member of the party's Ard Chomhairle (National Executive). In the 2007–2011 Assembly, she served as Vice Chair of the Committee of Social Development and was a member of the Committee of the centre, as well as other statutory and ad-hoc committees.

== Education and background ==
Born in Dungannon, Gildernew attended St Catherine's College Armagh and later the University of Ulster, Coleraine. After graduating from university, she travelled extensively in Europe, the United States and Australia, where she worked for a year.

Gildernew is one of ten siblings from an Irish republican family based at the "Gildernew farm complex" (as described on Ordnance Survey maps) in County Tyrone. During the 1960s, the family were leading figures in the Northern Ireland Civil Rights Association and took part in a 1968 protest in Caledon, County Tyrone over housing discrimination.

== Political career ==
On returning to Northern Ireland in 1996, Gildernew was the second-placed but unsuccessful candidate for Sinn Féin in the Northern Ireland Forum elections for Fermanagh and South Tyrone. The following year, she was appointed Sinn Féin representative to London and was part of the first Sinn Féin delegation to visit Downing Street. In the 1998 Assembly elections, she was elected MLA for Fermanagh and South Tyrone, retaining the seat in the 2003 and 2007 elections. Gildernew has campaigned on women's and mothers' rights.

=== Election to Westminster ===
In the 2001 UK general election, Gildernew was elected to Parliament as Member for Fermanagh and South Tyrone, defeating the Ulster Unionist candidate James Cooper by 53 votes. She was the first female candidate elected from her party to the House of Commons in over 80 years since Constance Markievicz in 1918. Like all Sinn Féin MPs, she followed a policy of abstentionism and never took her seat in Westminster in the five times she was elected at the polls.

In the 2005 election, she was re-elected and increased her majority to 4,582 votes. In the 2010 election, the Democratic Unionists (DUP), Ulster Conservatives and Unionists and Traditional Unionist Voice (TUV) all chose not to field candidates and she held her seat by four votes against Independent Unionist Rodney Connor.

In October 2014, Sinn Féin announced that Gildernew would be the party's candidate in the 2015 Westminster election. She lost the seat by 530 votes to Ulster Unionist Party candidate Tom Elliott. According to the Times Guide to the House of Commons, Gildernew was popular across the sectarian divide in one of Northern Ireland's most polarised constituencies.

She won her seat back in 2017, beating Elliott by 875 votes. Elliott closed the gap to a mere 57 votes in 2019, making Fermanagh and South Tyrone the most marginal seat in the country.

In 2019. Gildernew supported John O'Dowd's unsuccessful bid to become Vice President of Sinn Féin at the party's ard fheis.

=== Minister for Agriculture and Rural Development ===
During her time as Minister for Agriculture and Rural Development, Gildernew dealt with problems such as an outbreak of bluetongue disease. She also increased cross-border co-operation with the Republic of Ireland on farming issues.

=== 2011 Irish presidential election ===
In September 2011, the Belfast Telegraph reported that Sinn Féin was considering Gildernew as their candidate for that year's Irish presidential election. Sinn Féin would ultimately nominate Martin McGuinness for president.

=== Support for Seán Quinn ===
In a July 2012 interview for The Impartial Reporter, Gildernew defended embattled businessman Seán Quinn, saying that "[h]e has been treated disgracefully by the Irish Government. Had they not tried to strip him of all his assets, including his home, deny him the ability to function in business, and routinely try to humiliate him I believe he would have paid back every penny he owed to the Irish taxpayer". Quinn, the former head of the privately owned Quinn Group (now Mannok), was declared bankrupt in January 2012. (With loans worth around €1.2 billion from the Anglo-Irish Bank, the Quinn group was exposed by its collapse and, on 30 March 2010, the High Court appointed joint provisional administrators to Quinn Insurance.)

Sinn Féin distanced themselves from Gildernew's comments with Mary Lou McDonald stating that Seán Quinn had engaged in illegal business practices.

=== 2024 European Parliament election and retirement from Westminster ===
In January 2024, Gildernew was announced as one two Sinn Féin candidates for the Midlands–North-West constituency at the 2024 European Parliament election in Ireland.

In May 2024, she announced she would stand down as an MP at the 2024 general election, in order to focus on her campaign for the European elections. In the election, Gildernew received 45,807 (6.7%) first preferences votes but was not elected.

Gildernew was one of five Sinn Féin paid employees to lose their jobs in May 2025 following a "radical" party restructuring.

== Personal life ==
Gildernew is married to Jimmy Taggart; they have two sons, and one daughter.

Northern Ireland Assembly
New assembly	Member of the Legislative Assembly for Fermanagh and South Tyrone; 1998–2012	Succeeded by Bronwyn McGahan
Preceded by Bronwyn McGahan	Member of the Legislative Assembly for Fermanagh and South Tyrone; 2016–2017	Succeeded by Colm Gildernew
Parliament of the United Kingdom
Preceded by Ken Maginnis	Member of Parliament for Fermanagh and South Tyrone; 2001–2015	Succeeded by Tom Elliott
Preceded by Tom Elliott	Member of Parliament for Fermanagh and South Tyrone; 2017–2024	Succeeded by Pat Cullen
Political offices
Vacant Position suspended Title last held by Bríd Rodgers	Minister for Agriculture and Rural Development of Northern Ireland; 2007–2011	Succeeded by Michelle O'Neill
