= Bronwyn McGahan =

Northern Irish politician (born 1972)

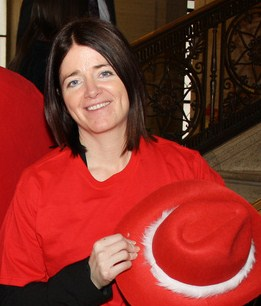

Member of the Northern Ireland Assembly for Fermanagh and South Tyrone
- In office 7 July 2012 – 30 March 2016
- Preceded by: Michelle Gildernew
- Succeeded by: Michelle Gildernew

Personal details
- Born: 24 January 1972 (age 54)
- Party: Sinn Féin

Bronwyn McGahan is an Irish Sinn Féin politician who was selected by her party as a member (MLA) of the Northern Ireland Assembly to represent the Fermanagh and South Tyrone constituency in June 2012.

She replaced her party colleague Michelle Gildernew, who had resigned from the Northern Ireland Assembly as part of Sinn Féin's policy of abolishing double jobbing after being elected to the parliament of the United Kingdom. Gildernew was defeated for re-election as abstentionist MP in 2015 by 530 votes to Ulster Unionist Party candidate Tom Elliott.

Northern Ireland Assembly
Preceded by Michelle Gildernew	MLA for Fermanagh and South Tyrone; 2012–2016	Succeeded by Michelle Gildernew
