= Ken Maginnis =

Northern Irish politician (born 1938)

Major The Right Honourable The Lord Maginnis of Drumglass

Member of the House of Lords
- Lord Temporal
- Life peerage 20 July 2001

Member of Dungannon and South Tyrone Borough Council
- In office 7 June 2001 – 5 May 2005
- Preceded by: Joan Carson
- Succeeded by: Gilbert Greenaway
- Constituency: Dungannon Town
- In office 15 May 1985 – 19 May 1993
- Preceded by: District created
- Succeeded by: Leslie Holmes
- Constituency: Dungannon Town
- In office 20 May 1981 – 15 May 1985
- Preceded by: Jack Hassard
- Succeeded by: District abolished
- Constituency: Dungannon Area D

Member of Parliament for Fermanagh and South Tyrone
- In office 9 June 1983 – 14 May 2001
- Preceded by: Owen Carron
- Succeeded by: Michelle Gildernew

Member of the Northern Ireland Forum for Fermanagh and South Tyrone
- In office 30 May 1996 – 25 April 1998

Member of the Northern Ireland Assembly for Fermanagh and South Tyrone
- In office 20 October 1982 – 1986
- Preceded by: Assembly reconvened
- Succeeded by: Assembly dissolved

Personal details
- Born: 21 January 1938 (age 88) Dungannon, Northern Ireland
- Party: Independent Ulster Unionist
- Other political affiliations: Ulster Unionist Party (until 2012)
- Education: Royal School Dungannon

Kenneth Wiggins Maginnis, Baron Maginnis of Drumglass (born 21 January 1938), is a Northern Irish politician and life peer. Since December 2020, he has been suspended from the House of Lords, where he formerly sat for the Ulster Unionist Party (UUP). He was the Ulster Unionist Party Member of Parliament (MP) for Fermanagh and South Tyrone from 1983 to 2001.

== Background ==
Maginnis was educated at the Royal School Dungannon and at Stranmillis College. He worked as a teacher for a number of years before joining the Ulster Defence Regiment (UDR) in 1971. After leaving the British Army with the rank of major in 1981, he became the Ulster Unionist Party (UUP) spokesman on internal security and defence, and was that same year elected to Dungannon District Council, on which he sat for twelve years until losing his seat in 1993.

== August 1981 by-election in Fermanagh and South Tyrone ==
Maginnis was the Ulster Unionist candidate for Fermanagh and South Tyrone in the second by-election in 1981, coming second. This by-election was caused by the death of sitting MP Bobby Sands on hunger strike. As a result of changes to the electoral law with the passing of the Representation of the People Act 1981, another hunger striker could not be nominated. Instead Owen Carron, who had served as Sands' election agent in the earlier election, was nominated and elected as an "Anti-H-Block Proxy Political Prisoner".

== Member of Parliament ==
The following year, he was elected to the failed Northern Ireland Assembly, as a representative for the Fermanagh and South Tyrone constituency. At the 1983 general election he was elected to the House of Commons as the Member of Parliament for the constituency of the same name, defeating Carron who was defending the seat as a Sinn Féin candidate. Two years later, along with the rest of his Unionist colleagues, he resigned his seat in protest at the Anglo-Irish Agreement, but was re-elected in the subsequent by-election. He continued his protest by refusing to pay his car tax, for which he was sentenced to seven days' imprisonment in 1987.

== Councillor ==
He renewed his membership of Dungannon and South Tyrone Borough Council in 2001 when he was elected for Dungannon Town. However, in 2005 he chose to move to the neighbouring Clogher Valley electoral area in an attempt to boost the UUP vote. This strategy backfired and he again lost his seat.

== House of Lords ==
He stood down as an MP at the 2001 general election, and on 20 July of that year was created a life peer taking the title Baron Maginnis of Drumglass, of Carnteel in the County of Tyrone, and took his seat in the House of Lords, sitting initially with the UUP.

In December 2020, the House of Lords Conduct Committee recommended that Maginnis be suspended from the House of Lords for at least 18 months for breaching the Code of Conduct in relation to behaviour that constituted bullying and harassment against four complainants, including homophobic remarks directed at SNP MP Hannah Bardell and Shadow Environment Secretary Luke Pollard. As well as being overheard saying "I am not going to be bullied by queers", he sent an email to James Gray, chair of the All-Party Parliamentary Group for the Armed Forces, with the subject "Discrimination by Homos".

== Political views ==
Maginnis was perceived to be on the more social liberal wing of the UUP along with Lady Hermon. He is one of only three MPs in the Ulster Unionist Party's history not to have been a member of the Orange Order (the other two being Enoch Powell and Lady Hermon), although he was a member of the Apprentice Boys of Derry.

In April 1994 Sinn Féin demanded that their members be permitted to carry personal protection weapons like other political parties following the murder of Catholic woman Theresa Clinton (the wife of a Sinn Féin member) by the Ulster Defence Association (UDA). Maginnis, speaking as UUP security spokesman, responded: "Those who deliberately and consciously incite violence against themselves should not expect the law-abiding community to finance their protection.

In June 2012, on BBC Northern Ireland's The Nolan Show, Maginnis stated he was opposed to gay marriage because it was "unnatural" and he did not believe society should "have imposed on it something that is unnatural". He said: "Does that mean that every deviant practice has to be accommodated? Will the next thing be that we legislate for some sort of bestiality?" The comments prompted the Ulster Unionist Party leader, Mike Nesbitt, to state that Maginnis expressed his views in a personal capacity and did not reflect party policy. Maginnis's remarks were condemned by gay rights groups. That same month, at the behest of Nesbitt, he suffered the withdrawal of the UUP party whip over his comments; Maginnis resigned from the UUP on 28 August 2012.

== Controversies ==
In August 2013, Lord Maginnis of Drumglass was found guilty of an "angry and abusive tirade" following a road rage incident, and was fined.

In 2016, Maginnis received a heavy fine after refusing to pay a small fine for having the wrong ticket for a train journey between Gatwick Airport and London.

== See also ==
- List of Northern Ireland Members of the House of Lords

Northern Ireland Assembly (1982)
New assembly	MPA for Fermanagh and South Tyrone; 1982–1986	Assembly abolished
Parliament of the United Kingdom
Preceded by Owen Carron	Member of Parliament for Fermanagh and South Tyrone; 1983–2001	Succeeded by Michelle Gildernew
Northern Ireland Forum
New forum	Member for Fermanagh and South Tyrone; 1996–1998	Forum dissolved
Political offices
Preceded by Jack Allen	Honorary Treasurer of the Ulster Unionist Party; 2005–2008	Succeeded by Cllr Mark Cosgrove
Orders of precedence in the United Kingdom
Preceded by The Lord Kilclooney	Gentlemen; Baron Maginnis of Drumglass	Followed by The Lord Black of Crossharbour
