= Maurice Morrow =

Northern Irish unionist politician (born 1948)

The Right Honourable The Lord Morrow
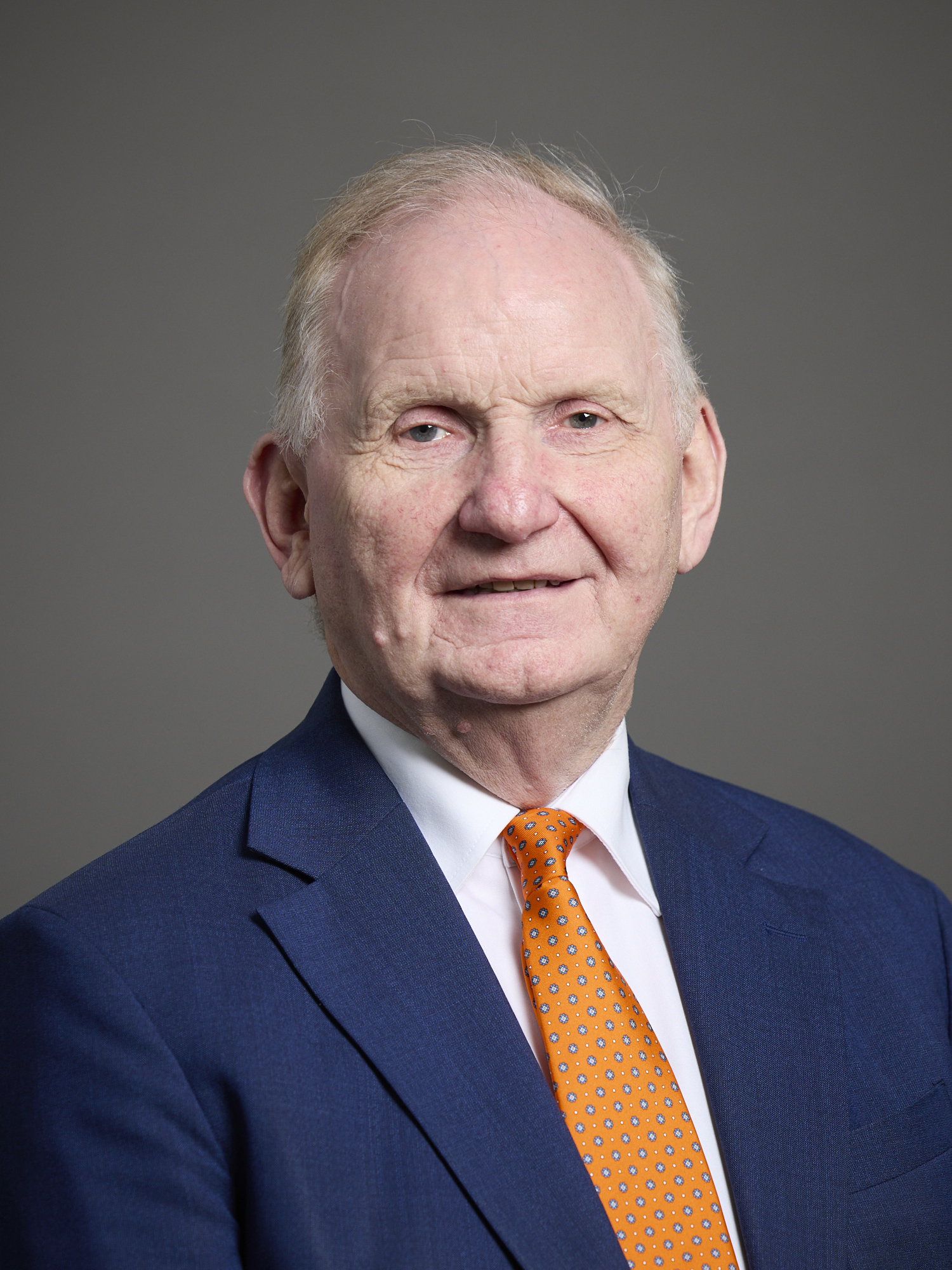
- Morrow in 2026

Member of the House of Lords
- Lord Temporal
- Life peerage 7 June 2006

Minister for Communities
- In office 12 January 2016 – 25 May 2016
- First Minister: Arlene Foster
- Preceded by: Mervyn Storey
- Succeeded by: Paul Givan

Minister for Social Development
- In office 27 July 2000 – 24 October 2001
- First Minister: David Trimble
- Preceded by: Nigel Dodds
- Succeeded by: Nigel Dodds

Member of the Legislative Assembly for Fermanagh & South Tyrone
- In office 25 June 1998 – 26 January 2017
- Preceded by: Constituency created
- Succeeded by: Seat abolished

Personal details
- Born: Maurice George Morrow; 27 September 1948 (age 78) Ballygawley, County Tyrone, Northern Ireland
- Party: Democratic Unionist Party
- Children: 2

Maurice George Morrow, Baron Morrow (born 27 September 1948) is a Unionist politician from Northern Ireland representing the Democratic Unionist Party (DUP) who has been Chairman of the DUP since 2000.

== Early life and education ==
The son of Ernest and Eliza Jane Morrow, He was educated at Ballygawley Primary School, Drumglass High School and Dungannon Technical College, following which he pursued a career as an estate agent.

== Political Representative ==
His political career began in 1973 when he was elected to Fermanagh District Council. He was also a councillor on Dungannon and South Tyrone Borough Council representing Dungannon Town. He served as a MLA of the Northern Ireland Assembly from 1998, until losing his seat in 2017. In July 2000 he became minister for social development in the Northern Ireland Executive.

It was announced on 11 April 2006 that Morrow would be one of the first three members of the DUP to be created life peers, giving the party its first representation in the House of Lords. He was created Baron Morrow, of Clogher Valley in the County of Tyrone, on 7 June 2006 and was formally introduced to the House of Lords on 27 June. Other DUP peers appointed as "working" life peers alongside Morrow were Wallace Browne, former lord mayor of Belfast, and Eileen Paisley, a former vice-president of the DUP and wife of the late leader of the DUP, Ian Paisley. At the same time, it was announced that David Trimble, former MP and former leader of the Ulster Unionists, was also being appointed as a working life peer.

=== Sex Bill ===
After hearing testimony about children and adults forced to work in brothels, farms and factories, including that of a Romanian woman who had been kidnapped in London and forced to work as a prostitute in Ireland, he put forward a bill to the Northern Ireland Assembly: the Human Trafficking and Exploitation Act, passed in 2015, which made Northern Ireland the first and only place in the UK where the act of buying sex is a crime. The act of selling sex, by contrast, was decriminalised. The law was opposed by campaigners who wished to see the total decriminalisation of sex work. An application for judicial review failed on the death of the campaigner who had proposed it.

== Personal life ==
Morrow was married and had two daughters. One of his daughters died on 15 November 2026, and his wife died a few hours later.

Northern Ireland Forum
New forum	Member for Fermanagh and South Tyrone; 1996–1998	Forum dissolved
Northern Ireland Assembly
New assembly	MLA for Fermanagh & South Tyrone; 1998–2017	Seat abolished
Party political offices
Preceded by James McClure	Chairman of the Democratic Unionist Party; 2000?–present	Incumbent
Political offices
Preceded by Nigel Dodds	Minister for Social Development; 2000–2001	Succeeded by Nigel Dodds
Preceded by Mervyn Storey	Minister for Communities; 2016	Succeeded by Paul Givan
Orders of precedence in the United Kingdom
Preceded by The Lord Teverson	Gentlemen; Baron Morrow	Followed by The Lord Morris of Handsworth
