= Dungannon and South Tyrone Borough Council =

Former local council in Northern Ireland

Coordinates: 54.425°N 7.096°W

- Area: 315 km^{2} (122 sq mi); Ranked 5th of 26
- District HQ: Dungannon
- Catholic: 64.1%
- Protestant: 33%
- Country: Northern Ireland
- Sovereign state: United Kingdom
- Councillors: MLAs Fermanagh & South Tyrone & Mid Ulster Sinn Féin: 6 DUP: 2 SDLP: 1 UUP: 1; MPs Pat Cullen (Sinn Féin) Francie Molloy (Sinn Féin)
- Website: www.dungannon.gov.uk

Dungannon and South Tyrone Borough Council (Irish: Comhairle Buirge Dhún Geanainn agus Thír Eoghain Theas, Ulster Scots: Rathgannon an Sooth Owenslanngh Cooncil) was a local council in Northern Ireland from 1973 until 2015. It was originally named Dungannon District Council, gaining borough status and adding "South Tyrone" to its name on 25 November 1999, after petitioning the Secretary of State for the Environment. In May 2015, under local government reorganisation in Northern Ireland it merged with Cookstown District Council and Magherafelt District Council to become Mid-Ulster District Council.

== Subdivisions ==
Map of the borough's DEAs from 1993 to 2014

The main town in the district was Dungannon, where the council was headquartered. The council area covered the southern part of County Tyrone (along with a small area of County Armagh) and had a population of nearly 58,000. Its smaller towns included: Augher, Clogher, Fivemiletown, Ballygawley, Caledon, Aughnacloy, Benburb, Moy and Coalisland. The council area was divided into four electoral areas: Blackwater, Clogher Valley, Dungannon Town and Torrent. In the 2005 elections, 22 members were elected from the following political parties: 8 Sinn Féin, 5 Democratic Unionist Party (DUP), 4 Ulster Unionist Party (UUP) 4 Social Democratic and Labour Party (SDLP) and 1 Éirígí (EIR). The Council adopted the d'Hondt system in 2001 which allows the position of Mayor and Deputy Mayor to be allocated according to party size. The last mayor was Councillor Michelle O'Neill (SF) and the Deputy Mayor was Councillor Norman Badger (UUP). In elections for the Westminster Parliament it was split between the Mid-Ulster and Fermanagh & South Tyrone constituencies.

== Review of Public Administration ==
Under the Review of Public Administration (RPA) the council was due to merge with Magherafelt District Council and Cookstown District Council in 2011 to form a single council for the enlarged area totalling 1714 km^{2} and a population of 120, 096. The next election was due to take place in May 2009, but on 25 April 2008, Shaun Woodward, Secretary of State for Northern Ireland announced that the scheduled 2009 district council elections were to be postponed until the introduction of the eleven new councils in 2011.

== Population ==
The area covered by Dungannon and South Tyrone Borough Council has a population of 57,852 residents according to the 2011 Northern Ireland census.

== See also ==
- Local government in Northern Ireland
