= Carntogher (District Electoral Area) =

District electoral area in Northern Ireland

- Mid Ulster District Council DEA constituency

Current constituency
- Created: 2014
- Seats: 5 (2014-)
- Councillors: Kyle Black (DUP); Córa Corry (SF); Paddy Kelly (SF); Brian McGuigan (SF); Sean McPeake (SF)

Carntogher DEA within Mid Ulster

Carntogher is one of the seven district electoral areas (DEA) in Mid Ulster, Northern Ireland. The district elects five members to Mid Ulster District Council and contains the wards of Lower Glenshane, Maghera, Swatragh, Tamlaght O'Crilly and Valley. Carntogher forms part of the Mid Ulster constituencies for the Northern Ireland Assembly and UK Parliament.

It was created for the 2014 local elections, largely replacing the Sperrin DEA which had existed since 1985.

== Councillors ==
Election	Councillor (Party)	Councillor (Party)	Councillor (Party)	Councillor (Party)	Councillor (Party)
2023	Sean McPeake (Sinn Féin)	Brian McGuigan (Sinn Féin)	Córa Corry (Sinn Féin)	Paddy Kelly (Sinn Féin)	Kyle Black (DUP)
2019	Sean McPeake (Sinn Féin)	Brian McGuigan (Sinn Féin)	Córa Corry (Sinn Féin)	Martin Kearney (SDLP)	Kyle Black (DUP)
2014	Sean McPeake (Sinn Féin)	Brian McGuigan (Sinn Féin)	Kate McEldowney (Sinn Féin)	Martin Kearney (SDLP)	James Shiels (DUP)

== 2023 Election ==
2019: 3 x Sinn Féin, 1 x SDLP, 1 x DUP

2023: 4 x Sinn Féin, 1 x DUP

2019–2023 Change: Sinn Féin gain from SDLP

Carntogher - 5 seats
Party	Candidate	FPv%	Count				
Party	Candidate	FPv%	1	2	3	4	5
Sinn Féin	Brian McGuigan*	21.62%	1,909				
Sinn Féin	Sean McPeake*	17.44%	1,540				
Sinn Féin	Paddy Kelly	11.88%	1,049	1,397.26	1,407.10	1,518.10	
Sinn Féin	Córa Corry*	14.53%	1,283	1,335.36	1,381.20	1,472.62	
DUP	Kyle Black*	13.69%	1,209	1,209.00	1,209.04	1,227.04	1,681.04
SDLP	Martin Kearney*	9.39%	829	843.08	847.52	979.00	994.00
TUV	James Artt	6.00%	530	530.00	530.00	533.00	
Aontú	Noreen McEldowney	5.45%	481	486.06	487.38		
Electorate: 12,744 Valid: 8,830 (69.29%) Spoilt: 81 Quota: 1,472 Turnout: 8,911 (69.92%)

== 2019 Election ==
2014: 3 x Sinn Féin, 1 x DUP, 1 x SDLP

2019: 3 x Sinn Féin, 1 x DUP, 1 x SDLP

2014–2019 Change: No change

Carntogher – 5 seats
Party	Candidate	FPv%	Count					
Party	Candidate	FPv%	1	2	3	4	5	6
Sinn Féin	Brian McGuigan*	17.69%	1,406					
DUP	Kyle Black	15.45%	1,228	1,244	1,244.1	1,741.1		
SDLP	Martin Kearney*	13.48%	1,071	1,111	1,112.2	1,158.4	1,360.4	
Sinn Féin	Sean McPeake*	14.65%	1,164	1,168	1,174.15	1,175.15	1,176.15	1,273.45
Sinn Féin	Cora Groogan	12.46%	990	998	1,053.9	1,053.9	1,053.9	1,199.25
Sinn Féin	Paul Henry	9.60%	763	770	775.3	776.3	779.3	856.5
Aontú	Pádraigin Uí Raifeartaigh	7.95%	632	654	. 655.15	657.15	668.15	
UUP	Christopher Reid	6.98%	555	580	580			
Independent	James Armour	1.74%	138					
Electorate: 12,322 Valid: 7,942 (64.45%) Spoilt: 82 Quota: 1,325 Turnout: 8,029 (65.16%)

== 2014 Election ==
2014: 3 x Sinn Féin, 1 x SDLP, 1 x DUP

Carntogher - 5 seats
Party	Candidate	FPv%	Count				
Party	Candidate	FPv%	1	2	3	4	5
DUP	James Shiels	8.98%	675	927	1,514		
SDLP	Martin Kearney*	14.84%	1,116	1,121	1,212	1,399	
Sinn Féin	Seán McPeake*	16.57%	1,246	1,246	1,247	1,248	1,256
Sinn Féin	Kate McEldowney*	15.96%	1,200	1,200	1,201	1,202	1,218
Sinn Féin	Brian McGuigan*	14.27%	1,073	1,073	1,074	1,076	1,079
Sinn Féin	Gabhán McFalone*	14.10%	1,060	1,060	1,061	1,061	1,064
UUP	Jackie Crawford*	8.66%	651	869			
TUV	Noel Stewart	6.62%	498				
Electorate: 11,673 Valid: 7,520 (64.42%) Spoilt: 140 Quota: 1,254 Turnout: 7,660 (65.62%)
