= 2014 Mid Ulster District Council election =

Local government election in Northern Ireland

- 22 May 2014

All 40 council seats 21 seats needed for a majority
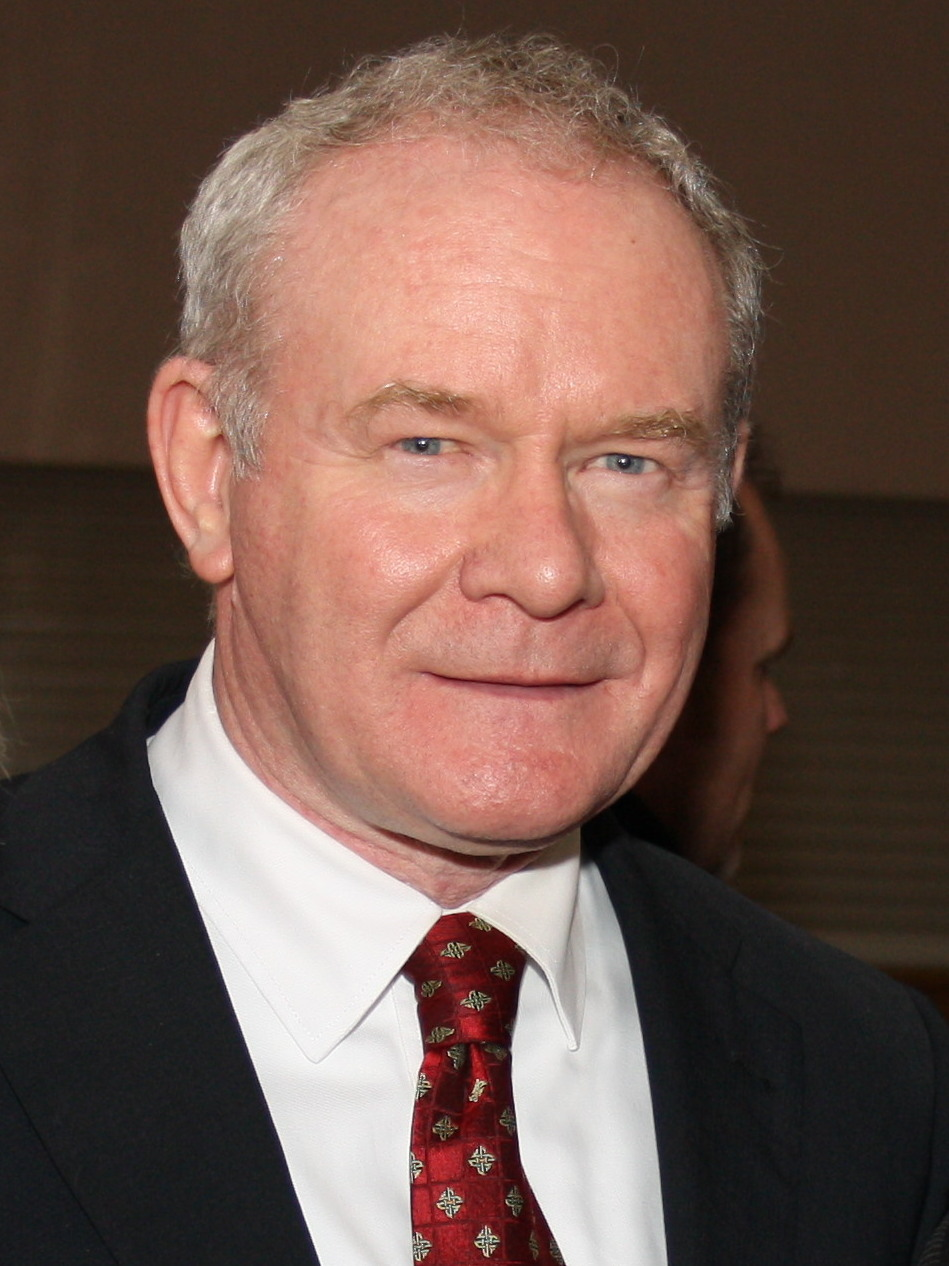

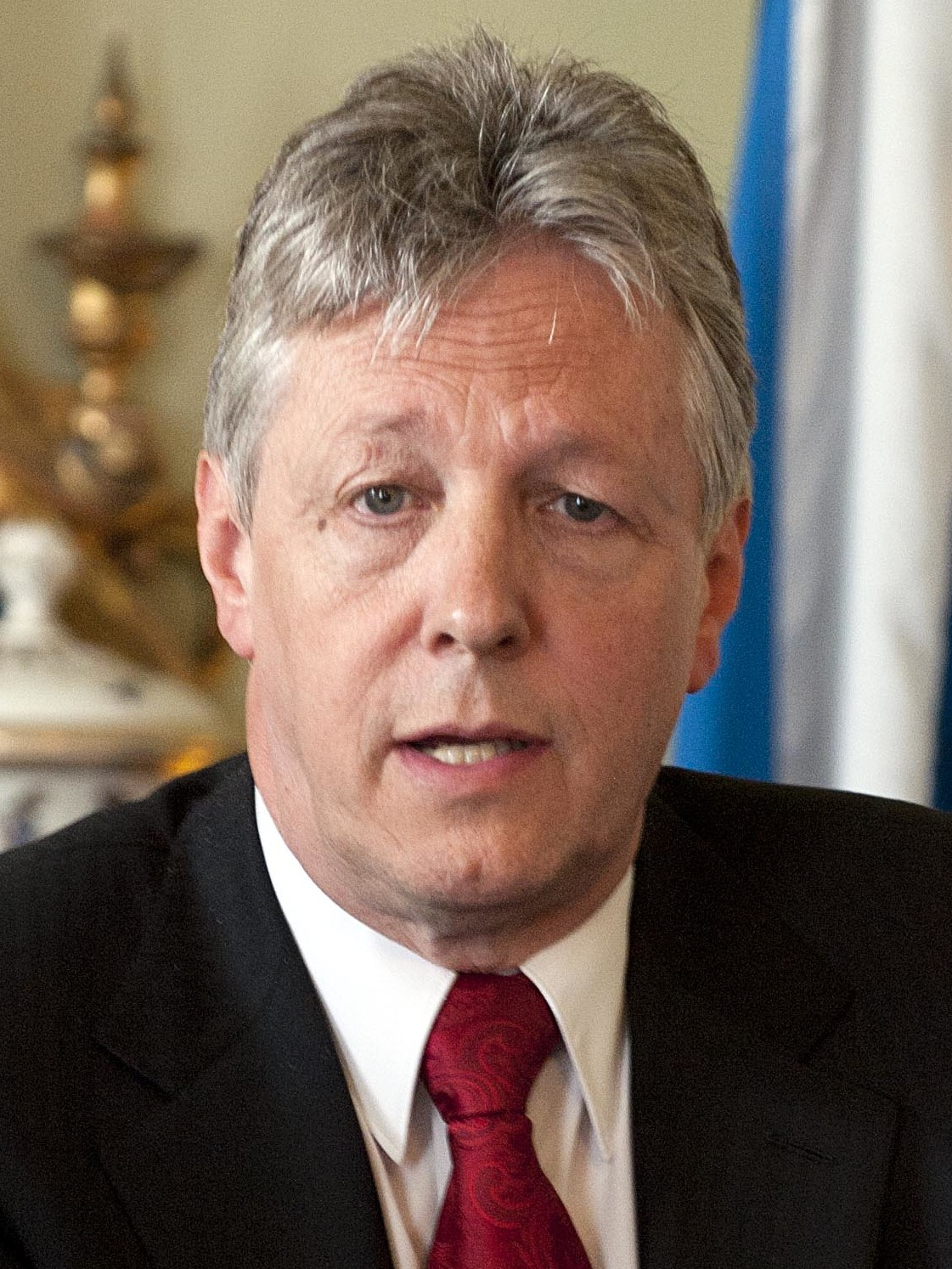

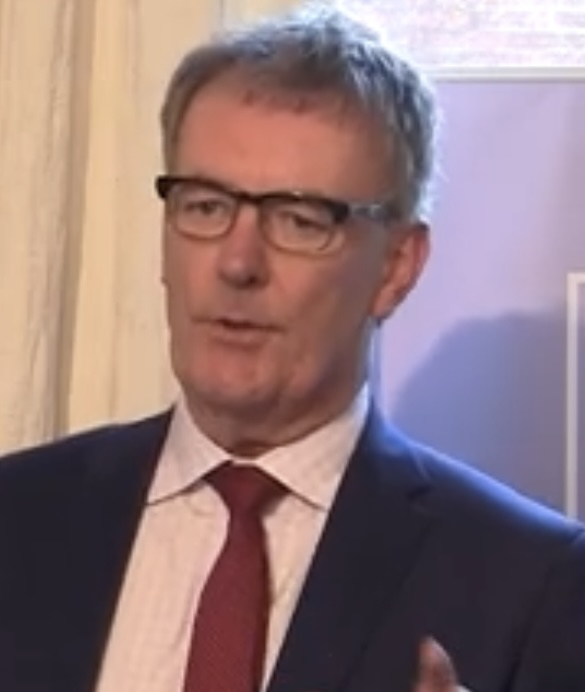

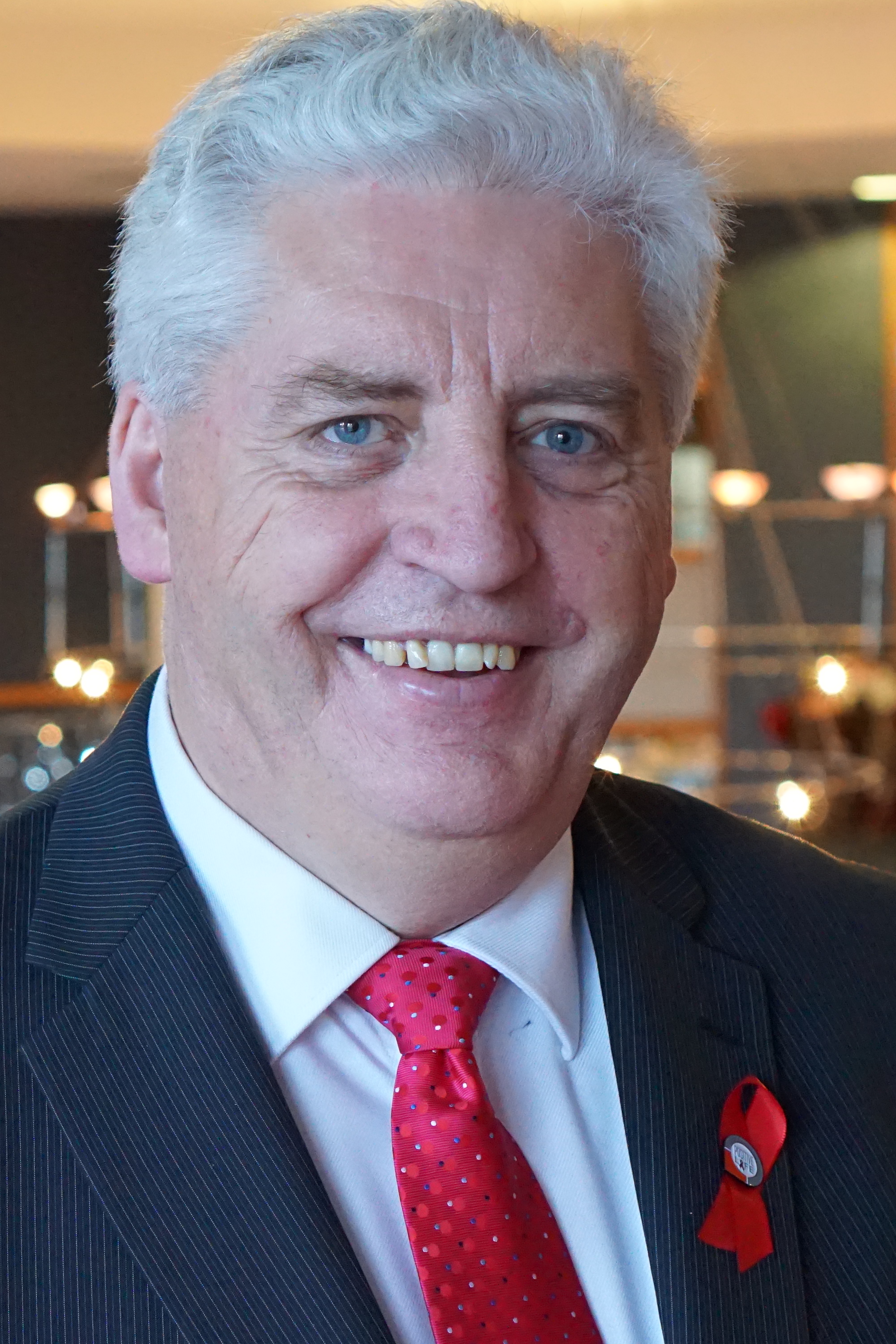

	First party	Second party	Third party
Leader	Martin McGuinness	Peter Robinson	Mike Nesbitt
Party	Sinn Féin	DUP	UUP
Seats won	18	8	7
Seat change	New council	New council	New council
Popular vote	22,587	9,723	9,573
Percentage	40.28%	17.34%	17.07%
	Fourth party	Fifth party
Leader	Alasdair McDonnell
Party	SDLP	Independent
Seats won	6	1
Seat change	New council	New council
Popular vote	7,600	2,689
Percentage	13.55%	4.80%
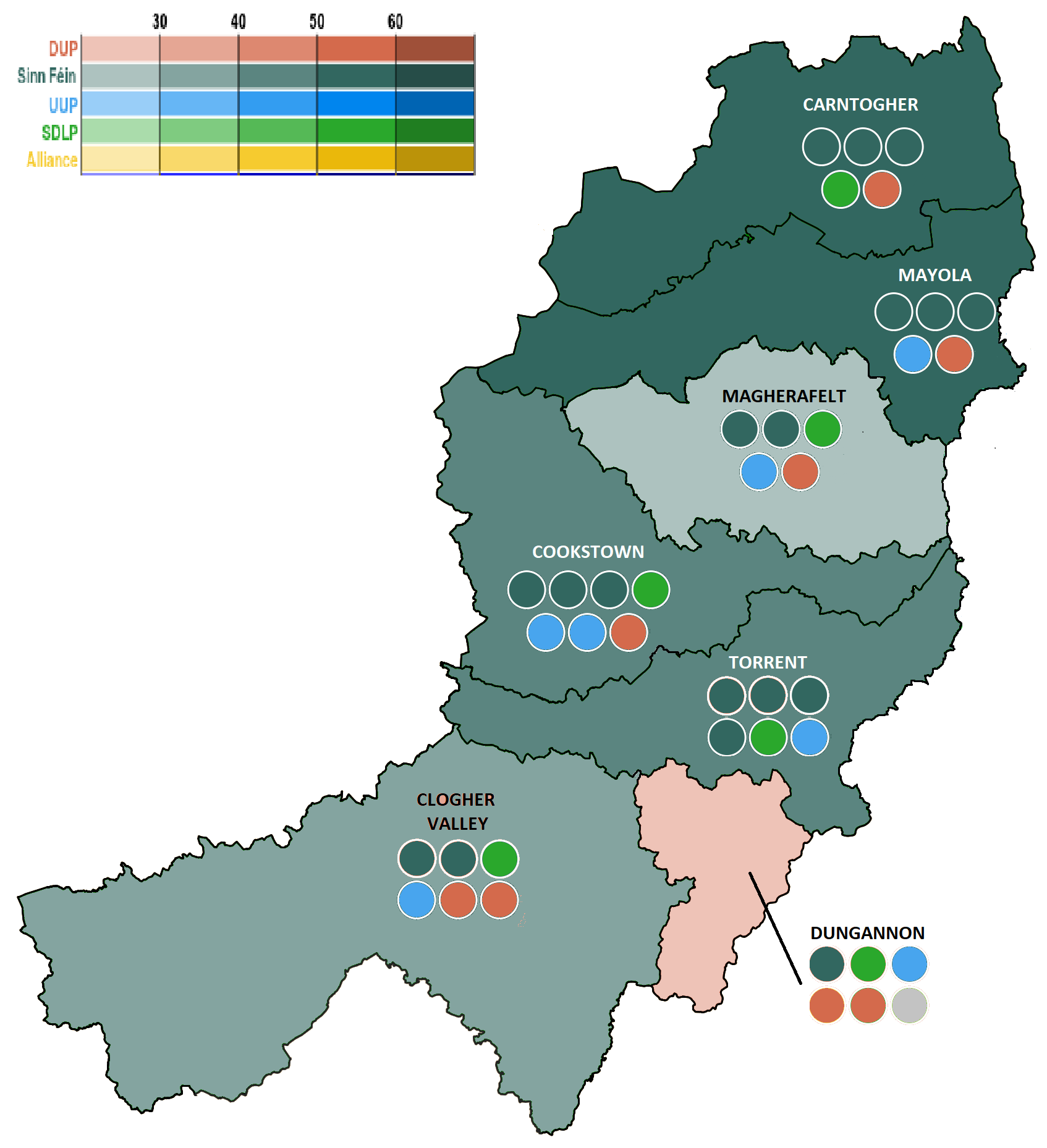
- Mid Ulster 2014 Council Election Results by DEA (Shaded by plurality of FPVs)

The 2014 Mid Ulster District Council election took place on 22 May 2014 to elect members of Mid Ulster District Council in Northern Ireland. This was on the same day as other local elections.

== Results by party ==
Party	Seats	±	First Pref. votes	FPv%	±%
Sinn Féin	18		22,587	40.28%	
DUP	8		9,723	17.34%	
UUP	7		9,573	17.07%	
SDLP	6		7,600	13.55%	
Independent	1		2,689	4.80%	
TUV	0		2,380	4.24%	
Alliance	0		350	0.62%	
UKIP	0		195	0.35%	
Totals	40		56,079	100.00%	—

== Districts summary ==
Results of the Mid Ulster District Council election, 2014 by district
Ward	%	Cllrs	%	Cllrs	%	Cllrs	%	Cllrs	%	Cllrs	Total Cllrs
Ward	Sinn Féin		DUP		UUP		SDLP		Others		Total Cllrs
Carntogher	60.9	3	9.0	1	8.7	0	14.8	1	6.6	0	5
Clogher Valley	33.1	2	28.4	2	25.1	1	13.5	1	0.0	0	6
Cookstown	42.3	3	12.5	1	23.7	2	12.0	1	9.5	0	7
Dungannon	20.3	1	20.8	2	20.3	1	9.1	1	29.5	1	6
Magherafelt	29.6	2	24.8	1	11.2	1	15.5	1	18.9	0	5
Moyola	51.0	3	18.5	1	17.0	1	13.6	0	0.0	0	5
Torrent	50.0	4	10.4	0	13.4	1	18.1	1	8.1	0	6
Total	41.0	18	17.6	8	17.4	7	13.8	6	3.6	1	40

== District results ==
=== Carntogher ===
Carntogher - 5 seats
Party	Candidate	FPv%	Count				
Party	Candidate	FPv%	1	2	3	4	5
DUP	James Shiels	8.98%	675	927	1,514		
SDLP	Martin Kearney*	14.84%	1,116	1,121	1,212	1,399	
Sinn Féin	Seán McPeake*	16.57%	1,246	1,246	1,247	1,248	1,256
Sinn Féin	Kate McEldowney*	15.96%	1,200	1,200	1,201	1,202	1,218
Sinn Féin	Brian McGuigan*	14.27%	1,073	1,073	1,074	1,076	1,079
Sinn Féin	Gabhán McFalone*	14.10%	1,060	1,060	1,061	1,061	1,064
UUP	Jackie Crawford*	8.66%	651	869			
TUV	Noel Stewart	6.62%	498				
Electorate: 11,673 Valid: 7,520 (64.42%) Spoilt: 140 Quota: 1,254 Turnout: 7,660 (65.62%)

=== Clogher Valley ===
Clogher Valley - 6 seats
Party	Candidate	FPv%	Count				
Party	Candidate	FPv%	1	2	3	4	5
DUP	Frances Burton*	18.57%	1,584				
Sinn Féin	Phelim Gildernew*	17.92%	1,528				
Sinn Féin	Seán McGuigan*	15.13%	1,290				
SDLP	Sharon McAleer	13.50%	1,151	1,153.07	1,453.29		
UUP	Robert Mulligan*	13.09%	1,116	1,163.84	1,166.9	1,182.54	1,210.54
DUP	Wills Robinson*	9.81%	837	1,117.14	1,118.5	1,123.6	1,135.6
UUP	Neil Somerville*	11.98%	1,022	1,052.36	1,053.38	1,056.78	1,068.78
Electorate: 14,030 Valid: 8,528 (60.78%) Spoilt: 137 Quota: 1,219 Turnout: 8,665 (61.76%)

=== Cookstown ===
Cookstown - 7 seats
Party	Candidate	FPv%	Count								
Party	Candidate	FPv%	1	2	3	4	5	6	7	8	9
Sinn Féin	Cathal Mallaghan*	16.41%	1,481								
UUP	Trevor Wilson*	14.61%	1,319								
Sinn Féin	John McNamee*	13.89%	1,254								
Sinn Féin	Gavin Bell	11.03%	996	1,307.76							
SDLP	Tony Quinn* ‡	8.90%	803	823.88	830.32	860.56	956.51	1,007.18	1,015.32	1,240.32	
DUP	Wilbert Buchanan*	7.94%	717	717.24	734.6	734.84	735.41	739.55	774.83	776.16	1,090.97
UUP	Mark Glasgow*	9.05%	817	817.72	919.36	919.6	919.98	931.54	980.52	986.95	1,032.88
TUV	Walter Millar	7.05%	636	636.24	670.96	671.2	672.91	676.29	733.85	738.52	813.9
DUP	Maureen Lees*	4.60%	415	415	433.2	433.44	433.44	435.82	465.24	468.43	
SDLP	Maria Cleary-McGuffin	3.06%	276	283.92	284.34	307.38	322.77	342.96	349.86		
UKIP	Alan Day	2.16%	195	195	197.52	198	199.9	205.04			
Alliance	Mickey McDonald	1.30%	117	119.16	120.42	123.06	128.57				
Electorate: 16,135 Valid: 9,026 (55.94%) Spoilt: 141 Quota: 1,129 Turnout: 9,167 (56.81%)

=== Dungannon ===
Dungannon - 6 seats
Party	Candidate	FPv%	Count					
Party	Candidate	FPv%	1	2	3	4	5	6
Independent	Barry Monteith*	19.67%	1,458					
UUP	Walter Cuddy*	14.61%	1,083					
Sinn Féin	Dominic Molloy*	14.10%	1,045	1,223.6				
DUP	Kim Ashton*	11.44%	848	849.14	849.9	859.9	1,029.28	1,289.28
DUP	Clement Cuthbertson*	9.35%	693	695.66	696.8	704.18	821.18	1,017.18
SDLP	Denise Mullen	9.14%	677	779.6	824.44	933.62	958	968.38
Sinn Féin	Dee Varsani*	6.17%	457	550.48	652.7	673.02	673.4	674.4
TUV	Kenny Loughrin	6.69%	496	496.76	497.52	501.9	578.9	
UUP	Winston Duff	5.68%	421	422.14	422.52	460.9		
Alliance	Hannah Su	3.14%	233	251.62	256.94			
Electorate: 14,067 Valid: 7,411 (52.68%) Spoilt: 175 Quota: 1,059 Turnout: 7,586 (53.93%)

=== Magherafelt ===
Magherafelt - 5 seats
Party	Candidate	FPv%	Count					
Party	Candidate	FPv%	1	2	3	4	5	6
DUP	Paul McLean*	15.84%	1,106	1,135	1,144	1,163	1,167	
UUP	George Shiels*	11.24%	785	803	809	834	841	1,225
Sinn Féin	Seán Clarke*	15.68%	1,095	1,095	1,101	1,132	1,147	1,147
SDLP	Christine McFlynn*	10.30%	719	724	756	822	1,116	1,119
Sinn Féin	Darren Totten*	13.96%	975	976	1,008	1,041	1,110	1,110
TUV	Gareth Ferguson	10.74%	750	786	791	806	808	1,001
DUP	Ross Mitchell	8.98%	627	635	635	641	642	
SDLP	Ben Niblock	5.18%	362	364	391	436		
Independent	Hugh McCloy	3.31%	231	240	310			
Independent	Michael Kelly	3.08%	215	220				
Independent	Robert Kelly*	1.69%	118					
Electorate: 12,483 Valid: 6,983 (55.94%) Spoilt: 119 Quota: 1,164 Turnout: 7,102 (56.89%)

=== Moyola ===
Moyola - 5 seats
Party	Candidate	FPv%	Count	
Party	Candidate	FPv%	1	2
Sinn Féin	Caoimhe O'Neill* ††	19.32%	1,431	
DUP	Anne Forde*	18.50%	1,370	
Sinn Féin	Catherine Elattar*	16.96%	1,256	
UUP	Derek McKinney	16.95%	1,255	
Sinn Féin	Peter Bateson* †	14.71%	1,089	1,274.08
SDLP	Austin Kelly	13.56%	1,004	1,014.64
Electorate: 12,119 Valid: 7,405 (61.10%) Spoilt: 131 Quota: 1,235 Turnout: 7,536 (62.18%)

=== Torrent ===
Torrent - 6 seats
Party	Candidate	FPv%	Count				
Party	Candidate	FPv%	1	2	3	4	5
Sinn Féin	Linda Dillon †	14.81%	1,218				
Sinn Féin	Joe O'Neill*	13.95%	1,147	1,310			
SDLP	Malachy Quinn	8.91%	733	822	846	847.89	1,361.89
Sinn Féin	Ronan McGinley	11.02%	906	958	982	985.36	1,139.51
UUP	Kenneth Reid* †	13.42%	1,104	1,106	1,109	1,109.09	1,117.12
Sinn Féin	Mickey Gillespie*	10.21%	840	936	1,003	1,031.47	1,069.47
DUP	Keith Buchanan	10.35%	851	852	852	852	856
SDLP	Deirdre Mayo*	9.23%	759	800	804	805.05	
Independent	Feargal O'Donnell	8.11%	667				
Electorate: 14,672 Valid: 8,225 (56.06%) Spoilt: 138 Quota: 1,176 Turnout: 8,363 (57.0%)

* Incumbent

== Changes during the term ==
=== † Co-options ===
Date	Electoral Area	Party	Outgoing	Co-optee	Reason
27 May 2016	Torrent	Sinn Féin	Linda Dillon	Niamh Doris	Dillon was elected to the Northern Ireland Assembly.
25 May 2017	Moyola	Sinn Féin	Caoimhe O'Neill	Niamh Milne	O'Neill resigned.
1 Dec 2018	Moyola	Sinn Féin	Peter Bateson	Donal McPeake	Bateson resigned.
1 Dec 2018	Moyola	Sinn Féin	Niamh Milne	Ian Milne	
2 Jan 2019	Torrent	UUP	Kenneth Reid	Robert Colvin	Reid resigned for health reasons.

=== ‡ Changes of affiliation ===
Date	Electoral Area	Name	Previous affiliation	New affiliation	Circumstance
1 May 2017	Cookstown	Tony Quinn	SDLP	Independent	Resigned.

Last updated 25 March 2019.

Current composition: see Mid Ulster District Council.
