= 2019 Mid Ulster District Council election =

Local government election in Northern Ireland

- 2 May 2019

All 40 council seats 21 seats needed for a majority
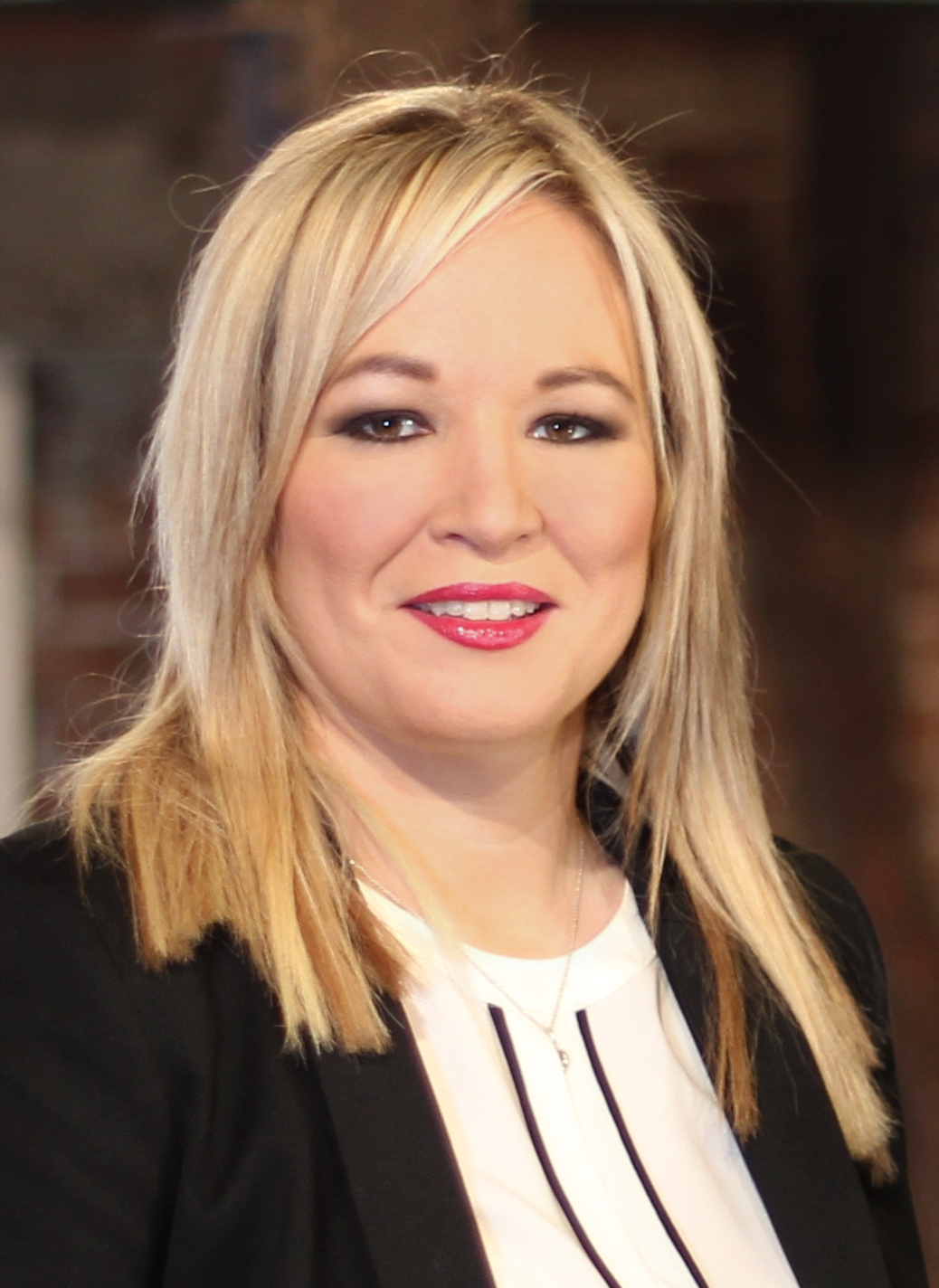

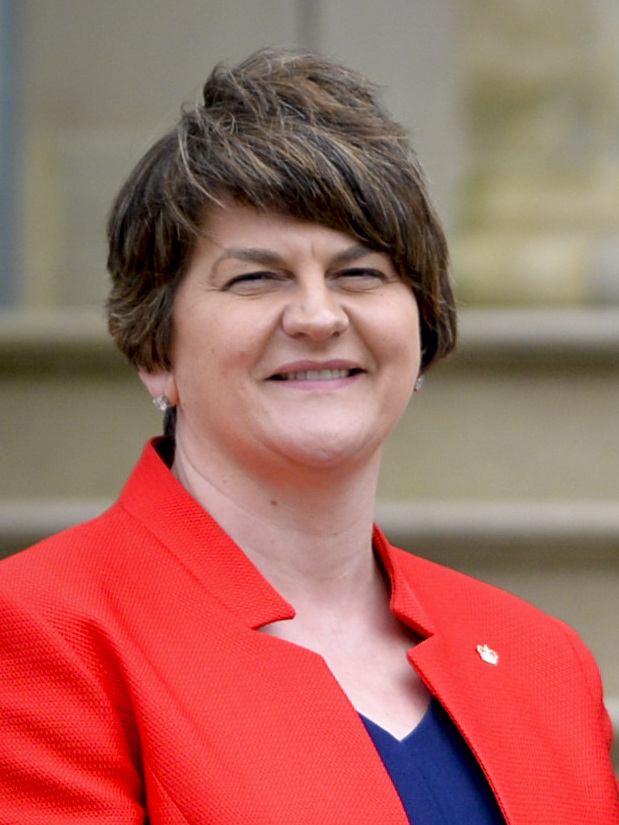

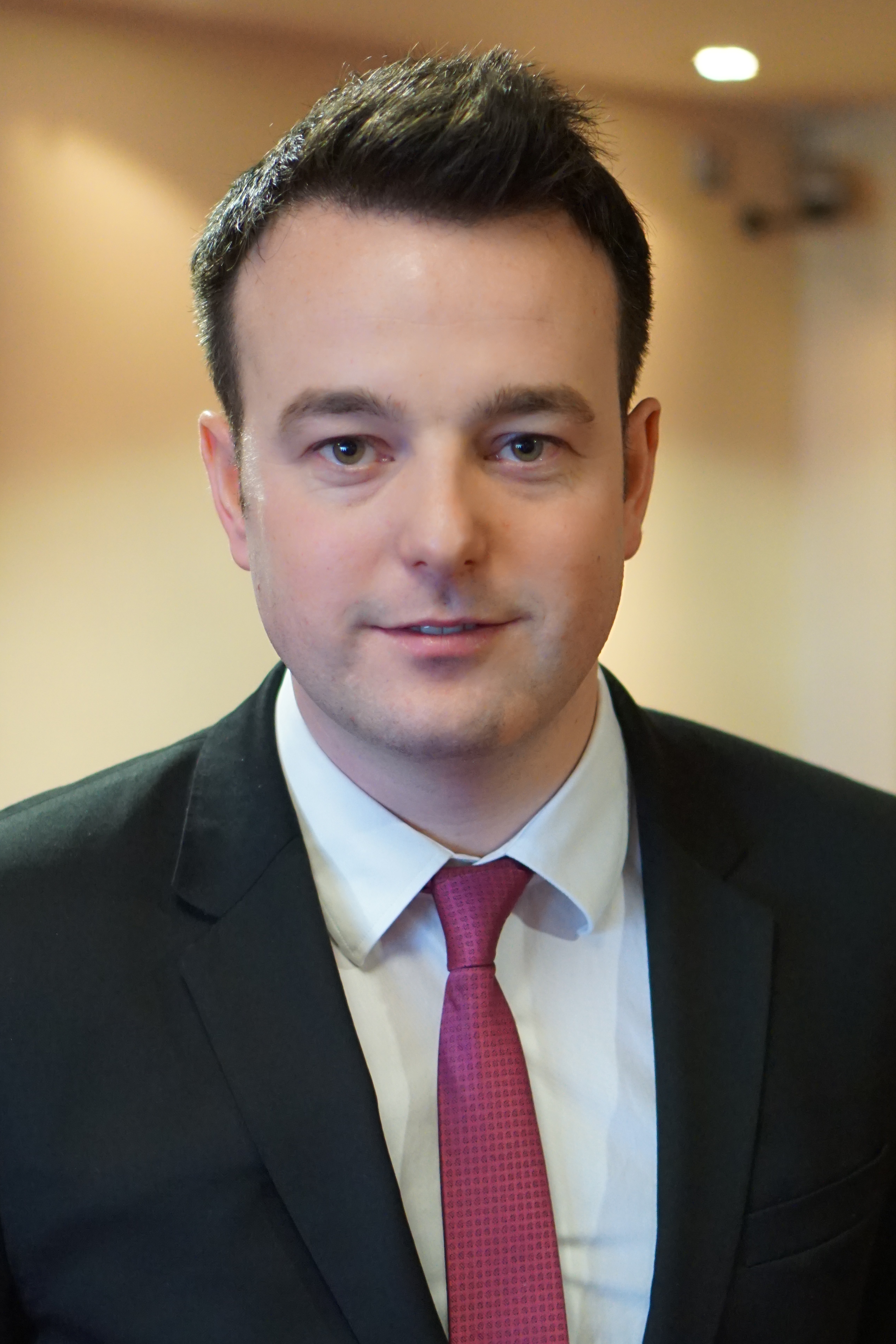

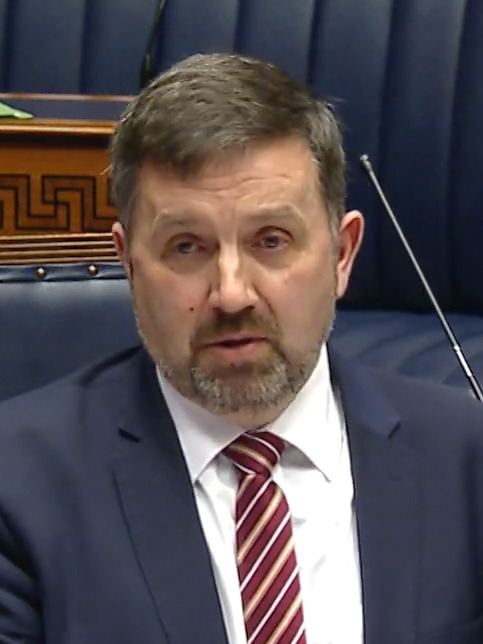
| | First party | Second party | Third party |
|---|---|---|---|
| Leader | Michelle O'Neill | Arlene Foster | Colum Eastwood |
| Party | Sinn Féin | DUP | SDLP |
| Seats won | 17 | 9 | 6 |
| Seat change | ▼1 | ▲1 | Steady |
| Popular vote | 23,553 | 13,700 | 8,512 |
| Percentage | 39.8% | 23.2% | 14.4% |
| Swing | ▼1.2 pp | ▲5.6 pp | ▲0.6 pp |
| | Fourth party | Fifth party |
| Leader | Robin Swann |
| Party | UUP | Independent |
| Seats won | 6 | 2 |
| Seat change | ▼1 | ▲1 |
| Popular vote | 8,021 | 3,422 |
| Percentage | 13.6% | 5.8% |
| Swing | ▼3.8 pp | ▲0.9 pp |
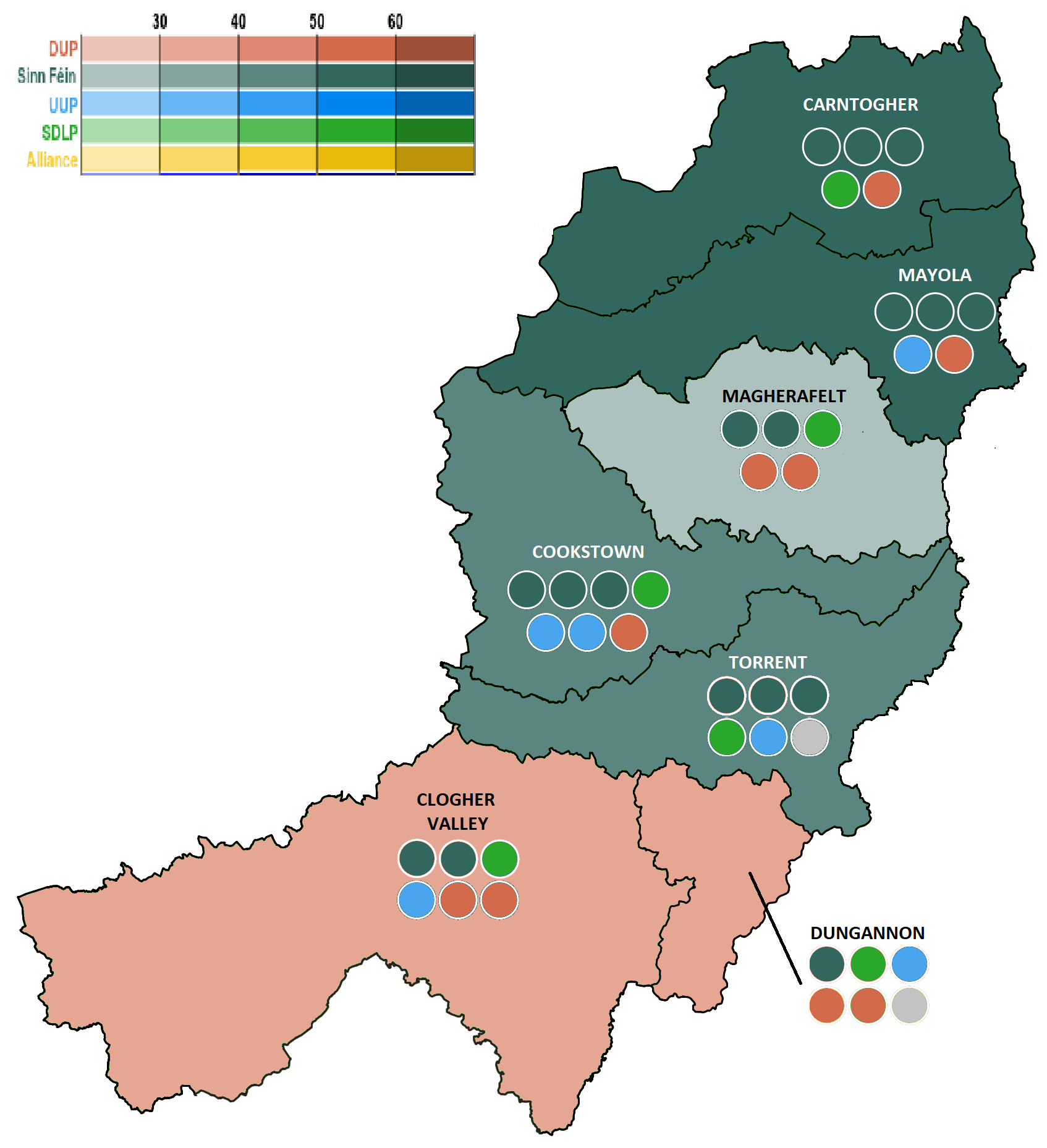
- Mid Ulster 2019 Council Election Results by DEA (Shaded by plurality of FPVs)

The 2019 Mid Ulster District Council election took place on 2 May 2019 to elect members of Mid Ulster District Council in Northern Ireland. This was on the same day as other local elections.

== Election results ==
Mid Ulster District Council Election Result 2019
| Party | Seats | Gains | Losses | Net gain/loss | Seats % | Votes % | Votes | +/− |
|---|---|---|---|---|---|---|---|---|
| Sinn Féin | 17 | 0 | 1 | ▼1 | 42.5 | 39.8 | 23,553 | ▼1.2 |
| DUP | 9 | 1 | 0 | ▲1 | 22.5 | 23.2 | 13,700 | ▲5.6 |
| SDLP | 6 | 0 | 0 | 0 | 15.0 | 14.4 | 8,512 | ▲0.6 |
| UUP | 6 | 0 | 1 | ▼1 | 15.0 | 13.6 | 8,021 | ▼3.8 |
| Independent | 2 | 1 | 0 | ▲1 | 5.0 | 5.8 | 3,422 | ▲0.9 |
| Aontú | 0 | 0 | 0 | 0 | 0.0 | 1.4 | 846 | New |
| Alliance | 0 | 0 | 0 | 0 | 0.0 | 1.2 | 729 | ▲0.6 |
| TUV | 0 | 0 | 0 | 0 | 0.0 | 0.4 | 230 | ▼3.9 |
| Workers' Party | 0 | 0 | 0 | 0 | 0.0 | 0.2 | 95 | ▲0.2 |

Note: "Votes" are the first preference votes.

The overall turnout was 58.97% with a total of 59,108 valid votes cast. A total of 1,072 ballots were rejected.

== Districts summary ==
Results of the Mid Ulster District Council election, 2019 by district
| Ward | % | Cllrs | % | Cllrs | % | Cllrs | % | Cllrs | % | Cllrs | % | Cllrs | Total Cllrs |
| Ward | Sinn Féin | | DUP | | SDLP | | UUP | | Alliance | | Others | | Total Cllrs |
|---|---|---|---|---|---|---|---|---|---|---|---|---|---|
| Carntogher | 54.4 | 3 | 15.5 | 1 | 13.5 | 1 | 7.0 | 0 | 0.0 | 0 | 9.7 | 0 | 5 |
| Clogher Valley | 31.3 | 2 | 32.7 | 2 | 18.0 | 1 | 18.0 | 1 | 0.0 | 0 | 0.0 | 0 | 6 |
| Cookstown | 42.4 | 3 | 20.8 | 1 | 14.5 | 1 | 19.8 | 2 | 0.0 | 0 | 2.5 | 0 | 7 |
| Dungannon | 20.7 | 1 | 31.8 | 2 | 8.6 | 1 | 12.6 | 1 | 5.2 | 0 | 21.2 | 1 | 6 |
| Magherafelt | 36.0 | 2 | 32.0 | 2 | 16.0 | 1 | 13.2 | 0 | 0.0 | 0 | 2.8 | 0 | 5 |
| Moyola | 50.9 | 3 | 20.6 | 1 | 11.7 | 0 | 11.9 | 1 | 3.8 | 0 | 1.2 | 0 | 5 |
| Torrent | 44.2 | 3 | 9.9 | 0 | 17.9 | 1 | 11.2 | 1 | 0.0 | 0 | 16.8 | 1 | 6 |
| Total | 39.8 | 17 | 23.2 | 9 | 14.4 | 6 | 13.6 | 6 | 1.2 | 0 | 7.8 | 2 | 40 |

== District results ==
=== Carntogher ===
2014: 3 x Sinn Féin, 1 x DUP, 1 x SDLP
2019: 3 x Sinn Féin, 1 x DUP, 1 x SDLP
2014–2019 Change: No change

Carntogher – 5 seats
| Party | Candidate | FPv% | Count | | | | | |
| Party | Candidate | FPv% | 1 | 2 | 3 | 4 | 5 | 6 |
|---|---|---|---|---|---|---|---|---|
| Sinn Féin | Brian McGuigan* | 17.69% | 1,406 | | | | | |
| DUP | Kyle Black | 15.45% | 1,228 | 1,244 | 1,244.1 | 1,741.1 | | |
| SDLP | Martin Kearney* | 13.48% | 1,071 | 1,111 | 1,112.2 | 1,158.4 | 1,360.4 | |
| Sinn Féin | Sean McPeake* | 14.65% | 1,164 | 1,168 | 1,174.15 | 1,175.15 | 1,176.15 | 1,273.45 |
| Sinn Féin | Cora Groogan | 12.46% | 990 | 998 | 1,053.9 | 1,053.9 | 1,053.9 | 1,199.25 |
| Sinn Féin | Paul Henry | 9.60% | 763 | 770 | 775.3 | 776.3 | 779.3 | 856.5 |
| Aontú | Pádraigin Uí Raifeartaigh | 7.95% | 632 | 654 | . 655.15 | 657.15 | 668.15 | |
| UUP | Christopher Reid | 6.98% | 555 | 580 | 580 | | | |
| Independent | James Armour | 1.74% | 138 | | | | | |
Electorate: 12,322 Valid: 7,942 (64.45%) Spoilt: 82 Quota: 1,325 Turnout: 8,029 (65.16%)

=== Clogher Valley ===
2014: 2 x DUP, 2 x Sinn Féin, 1 x UUP, 1 x SDLP
2019: 2 x DUP, 2 x Sinn Féin, 1 x UUP, 1 x SDLP
2014–2019 Change: No change

Clogher Valley – 6 seats
| Party | Candidate | FPv% | Count | | | |
| Party | Candidate | FPv% | 1 | 2 | 3 | 4 |
|---|---|---|---|---|---|---|
| DUP | Frances Burton* | 20.79% | 1,891 | | | |
| SDLP | Sharon McAleer* | 17.98% | 1,635 | | | |
| Sinn Féin | Sean McGuigan* | 16.43% | 1,494 | | | |
| Sinn Féin | Phelim Gildernew* | 14.87% | 1,352 | | | |
| DUP | Wills Robinson* † | 11.91% | 1,083 | 1,512.97 | | |
| UUP | Meta Graham | 10.89% | 990 | 1,103.77 | 1,255.77 | 1,398.33 |
| UUP | Robert Mulligan* | 7.15% | 650 | 682.86 | 854.86 | 919.34 |
Electorate: 14,781 Valid: 9,095 (61.53%) Spoilt: 167 Quota: 1,300 Turnout: 9,262 (62.66%)

=== Cookstown ===
2014: 3 x Sinn Féin, 2 x UUP, 1 x DUP, 1 x SDLP
2019: 3 x Sinn Féin, 2 x UUP, 1 x DUP, 1 x SDLP
2014–2019 Change: No change

Cookstown – 7 seats
| Party | Candidate | FPv% | Count | | | | | |
| Party | Candidate | FPv% | 1 | 2 | 3 | 4 | 5 | 6 |
|---|---|---|---|---|---|---|---|---|
| Sinn Féin | Cathal Mallaghan* | 18.50% | 1,710 | | | | | |
| Sinn Féin | John McNamee* | 14.81% | 1,369 | | | | | |
| SDLP | Kerri Hughes | 14.49% | 1,339 | | | | | |
| DUP | Wilbert Buchanan* | 13.26% | 1,225 | | | | | |
| Sinn Féin | Gavin Bell* | 9.09% | 840 | 1,385.7 | | | | |
| UUP | Trevor Wilson* | 11.27% | 1,041 | 1,042.02 | 1,047.46 | 1,103.46 | 1,163.46 | |
| UUP | Mark Glasgow* | 8.58% | 793 | 795.04 | 804.9 | 821.9 | 904.6 | 1,063.43 |
| DUP | Grace Neville | 7.51% | 694 | 695.36 | 696.72 | 707.72 | 796.74 | 819.65 |
| TUV | Alan Day | 2.49% | 230 | 230.34 | 237.48 | 249.48 | | |
Electorate: 16,472 Valid: 9,241 (56.10%) Spoilt: 153 Quota: 1,156 Turnout: 9,394 (57.03%)

=== Dungannon ===
2014: 2 x DUP, 1 x Sinn Féin, 1 x UUP, 1 x SDLP, 1 x Independent
2019: 2 x DUP, 1 x Sinn Féin, 1 x UUP, 1 x SDLP, 1 x Independent
2014–2019 Change: No change

Dungannon – 6 seats
| Party | Candidate | FPv% | Count | | | | | | |
| Party | Candidate | FPv% | 1 | 2 | 3 | 4 | 5 | 6 | 7 |
|---|---|---|---|---|---|---|---|---|---|
| DUP | Clement Cuthbertson* | 22.10% | 1,833 | | | | | | |
| Independent | Barry Monteith* | 17.05% | 1,414 | | | | | | |
| DUP | Kim Ashton* | 9.73% | 807 | 1,362.1 | | | | | |
| Sinn Féin | Dominic Molloy* | 12.00% | 995 | 996.75 | 1,016.47 | 1,016.59 | 1,053.93 | 1,207.93 | |
| UUP | Walter Cuddy* | 7.32% | 607 | 650.75 | 652.11 | 751.47 | 816.47 | 830.29 | 1,239.29 |
| SDLP | Denise Mullen* ‡ | 8.56% | 710 | 711.75 | 730.11 | 731.19 | 920.04 | 1,016.49 | 1,062.14 |
| Sinn Féin | Deirdre Varsani | 8.66% | 718 | 718.7 | 746.41 | 746.41 | 762.43 | 841.12 | 843.46 |
| UUP | Kim McNeill | 5.23% | 434 | 464.8 | 465.31 | 537.07 | 576.37 | 581.12 | |
| Independent | Niall Bowen | 4.16% | 345 | 345.35 | 496.48 | 496.96 | 544.85 | | |
| Alliance | Mel Boyle | 5.20% | 431 | 433.1 | 439.73 | 441.05 | | | |
Electorate: 15,366 Valid: 8,294 (53.98%) Spoilt: 335 Quota: 1,185 Turnout: 8,629 (56.16%)

=== Magherafelt ===
2014: 2 x Sinn Féin, 1 x DUP, 1 x SDLP, 1 x UUP
2019: 2 x Sinn Féin, 2 x DUP, 1 x SDLP
2014–2019 Change: DUP gain from UUP

Magherafelt – 5 seats
| Party | Candidate | FPv% | Count | | | |
| Party | Candidate | FPv% | 1 | 2 | 3 | 4 |
|---|---|---|---|---|---|---|
| Sinn Féin | Darren Totten* | 22.02% | 1,665 | | | |
| SDLP | Christine McFlynn* | 15.95% | 1,206 | 1,320 | | |
| Sinn Féin | Sean Clarke* | 13.99% | 1,058 | 1,107 | 1,500.75 | |
| DUP | Wesley Brown | 16.11% | 1,218 | 1,220 | 1,221 | 1,224 |
| DUP | Paul McLean* | 15.91% | 1,203 | 1,208 | 1,209.25 | 1,214.75 |
| UUP | George Shiels* | 13.17% | 996 | 1,001 | 1,001.75 | 1,022.25 |
| Aontú | Kevin Donnelly | 2.83% | 214 | | | |
Electorate: 13,112 Valid: 7,560 (57.66%) Spoilt: 86 Quota: 1,261 Turnout: 7,646 (58.31%)

=== Moyola ===
2014: 3 x Sinn Féin, 1 x DUP, 1 x UUP
2019: 3 x Sinn Féin, 1 x DUP, 1 x UUP
2014–2019 Change: No change

Moyola – 5 seats
| Party | Candidate | FPv% | Count | | | |
| Party | Candidate | FPv% | 1 | 2 | 3 | 4 |
|---|---|---|---|---|---|---|
| Sinn Féin | Ian Milne* | 21.72% | 1,710 | | | |
| DUP | Anne Forde* | 20.56% | 1,619 | | | |
| Sinn Féin | Catherine Elattar* | 17.63% | 1,388 | | | |
| Sinn Féin | Donal McPeake* | 11.51% | 906 | 1,269.4 | 1,325.4 | |
| UUP | Derek McKinney* | 11.90% | 937 | 937.23 | 981.23 | 1,274.4 |
| SDLP | Denise Johnston | 11.69% | 920 | 936.79 | 1,159.01 | 1,163.76 |
| Alliance | Aidan Bradley | 3.79% | 298 | 301.91 | | |
| Workers' Party | Hugh Scullion | 1.21% | 95 | 100.29 | | |
Electorate: 12,727 Valid: 7,873 (61.86%) Spoilt: 111 Quota: 1,313 Turnout: 7,984 (62.73%)

=== Torrent ===
2014: 4 x Sinn Féin, 1 x SDLP, 1 x UUP
2019: 3 x Sinn Féin, 1 x SDLP, 1 x UUP, 1 x Independent
2014–2019 Change: Independent gain from Sinn Féin

Torrent – 6 seats
| Party | Candidate | FPv% | Count | | | | |
| Party | Candidate | FPv% | 1 | 2 | 3 | 4 | 5 |
|---|---|---|---|---|---|---|---|
| SDLP | Malachy Quinn* | 17.93% | 1,631 | | | | |
| Independent | Dan Kerr | 16.76% | 1,525 | | | | |
| UUP | Robert Colvin* | 11.19% | 1,018 | 1,052.41 | 1,055.91 | 1,914.91 | |
| Sinn Féin | Ronan McGinley* † | 12.89% | 1,173 | 1,254.84 | 1,282.59 | 1,283.84 | 1,286.84 |
| Sinn Féin | Joe O'Neill* | 10.93% | 994 | 1,099.09 | 1,162.59 | 1,164.9 | 1,175.9 |
| Sinn Féin | Niamh Doris* | 11.01% | 1,002 | 1,066.48 | 1,175.73 | 1,157.04 | 1,170.04 |
| Sinn Féin | Mickey Gillespie* | 9.41% | 856 | 894.75 | 931.25 | 933.25 | 937.25 |
| DUP | Ian McCrea | 9.88% | 899 | 903.96 | 905.21 | | |
Electorate: 15,458 Valid: 9,098 (58.86%) Spoilt: 138 Quota: 1,300 Turnout: 9,236 (59.75%)

== Changes during the term ==
=== † Co-options ===
| Date | Electoral Area | Party | Outgoing | Co-optee | Reason |
|---|---|---|---|---|---|
| 7 February 2020 | Torrent | Sinn Féin | Ronan McGinley | Niall McAleer | McGinley resigned. |
| 23 December 2022 | Clogher Valley | DUP | Wills Robinson | Mark Robinson | Wills Robinson resigned. |

=== ‡ Changes in affiliation ===
| Date | Electoral Area | Name | Previous affiliation | New affiliation | Circumstance |
|---|---|---|---|---|---|
| 27 July 2019 | Dungannon | Denise Mullen | SDLP | Aontú | Resigned from the SDLP over disagreements on same-sex marriage and abortion. |

=== – Suspensions ===
None

Last updated 7 January 2023.

Current composition: see Mid Ulster District Council
