= Cathal Mallaghan =

Irish politician

Cathal Mallaghan MP

Member of Parliament for Mid Ulster
- Incumbent
- Assumed office 4 July 2024
- Preceded by: Francie Molloy
- Majority: 14,923 (32.8%)

Member of Mid Ulster District Council
- In office 22 May 2014 – 5 July 2024
- Preceded by: New council
- Succeeded by: Donna Mullin
- Constituency: Cookstown

Member of Cookstown District Council
- In office 5 May 2011 – 22 May 2014
- Preceded by: Oliver Molloy
- Succeeded by: Council abolished
- Constituency: Drum Manor

Personal details
- Born: Cathal Sean Mallaghan; December 1982 (age 43) County Tyrone, Northern Ireland, United Kingdom
- Party: Sinn Féin

Cathal Sean Mallaghan is an Irish Sinn Féin politician who has served as the Member of Parliament (MP) for Mid Ulster since 2024. Prior to the House of Commons he served in the Mid Ulster District Council.

== Career ==
In 2014, Mallaghan was elected to the Mid Ulster District Council. He was re-elected in 2019 and 2023, and served until his election to the House of Commons of the United Kingdom in 2024. During his tenure on the council he served as chair. He was a non-executive board member of the Northern Ireland Fire and Rescue Service.

In February 2024, Francie Molloy declined to seek reelection as the Member of Parliament (MP) for Mid Ulster. Sinn Féin selected Mallaghan as its candidate for the constituency. In the 2024 general election he won with a majority of 14,923 votes. The seat has been held by Sinn Féin since 1997. In line with the long standing party policy on abstentionism, Mallaghan does not take his seat in Westminster.

In 2025, he was selected to serve as chair of the Sinn Féin in the north Cúige.

== Political positions ==
Mallaghan called for the British government to conduct an inquiry into the murder of Sean Brown. He supported the results of an inquiry that determined that the special Air Service was not justified in killing four people at the Clonoe ambush.

During the 2024 election Mallaghan agreed to the six demands of the Palestine Solidarity Campaign which consisted of a ceasefire in the Gaza war, restoring funding to UNRWA, an embargo of weapon sales to Israel, support for the International Court of Justice and International Criminal Court, ending trade agreements with Israel, and protecting Boycott, Divestment and Sanctions. In 2025, he called for the United Kingdom to stop providing weapons to Israel and criticised Israel's treatment of Palestinians and its actions during the Gaza war.

== Works cited ==
=== News ===
- "Who are Northern Ireland's seven new MPs?". BBC. 5 July 2024. Archived from the original on 18 June 2025.
- Bain, Mark (4 July 2024). "Mallaghan ecstatic at 'filling big shoes' and boosting SF majority". Belfast Telegraph. Archived from the original on 18 June 2025.
- Jarvis, Chris (5 July 2024). "These are the 43 new MPs who backed Palestine Solidarity Campaign's six general election demands". Left Foot Forward. Archived from the original on 18 June 2025.
- O'Neill, Julian (6 February 2025). "SAS 'not justified' in 1992 shooting of four IRA men". BBC. Archived from the original on 18 June 2025.
- Scott, Michael (25 May 2024). "Former Mayor of Newry and Mourne, Daire Hughes, selected to be Sinn Féin candidate in Westminster election". Newry Reporter. Archived from the original on 18 June 2025.

=== Web ===
- "British government must do the right thing and establish public inquiry into Sean Brown murder – Mallaghan". Sinn Féin. 3 April 2025. Archived from the original on 18 June 2025.
- "Councillor Cathal Mallaghan". Sinn Féin. Archived from the original on 18 June 2025.
- "Last election result". House of Commons of the United Kingdom. Archived from the original on 18 June 2025.
- "Mallaghan addresses rally in London calling for peace and justice in Palestine". Sinn Féin. 15 March 2025. Archived from the original on 18 June 2025.
- "Mallaghan welcomes findings into SAS execution of four men in Clonoe". Sinn Féin. 6 February 2025. Archived from the original on 18 June 2025.
- "Sinn Féin announces Cathal Mallaghan as new Cúige Chair". Sinn Féin. 6 June 2025. Archived from the original on 18 June 2025.

Parliament of the United Kingdom
Preceded by Francie Molloy	Member of Parliament for Mid Ulster; 2024–present	Incumbent
