= 2023 Mid Ulster District Council election =

2023 Northern Irish local government election

- 18 May 2023

All 40 council seats 21 seats needed for a majority
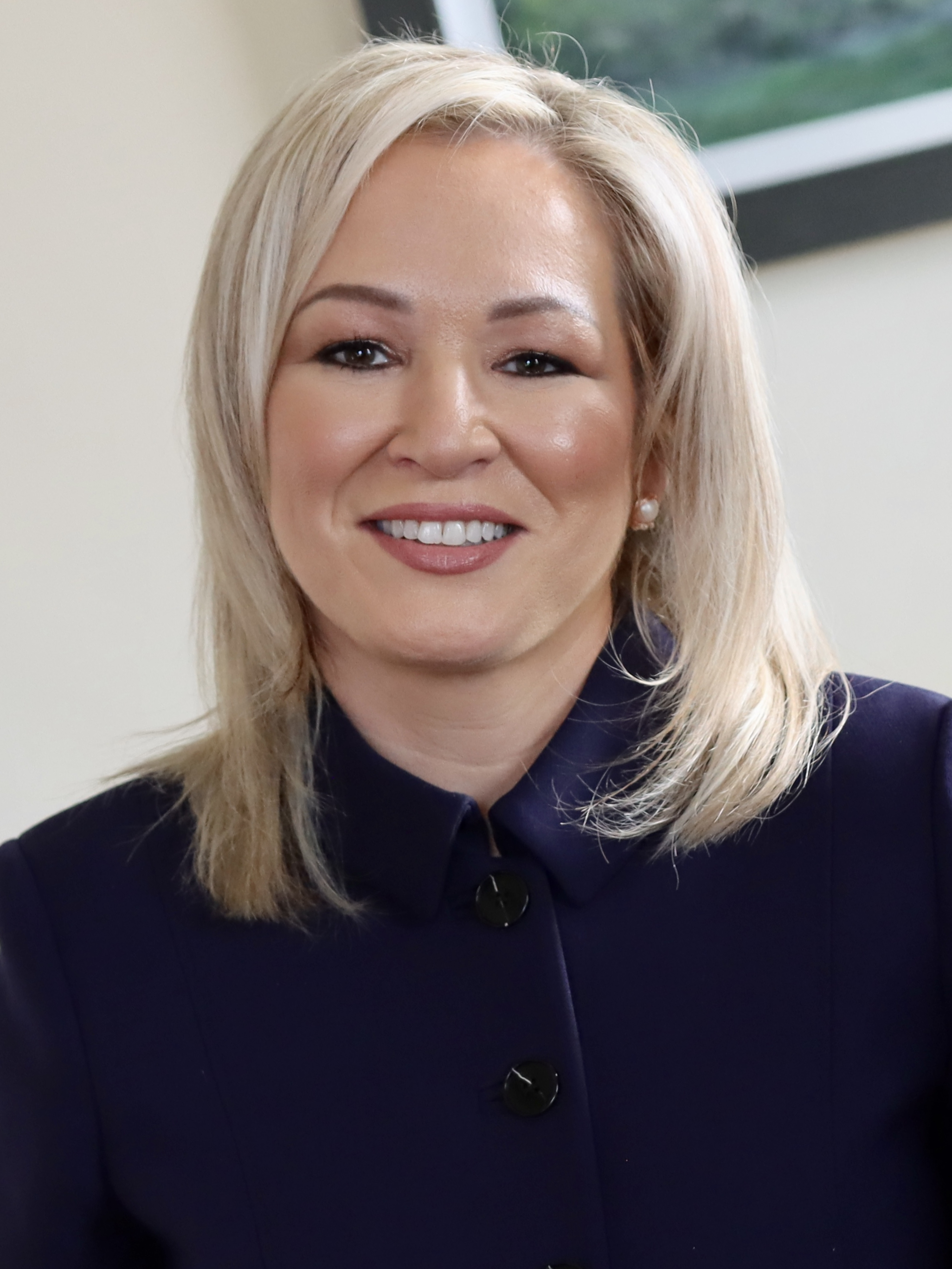

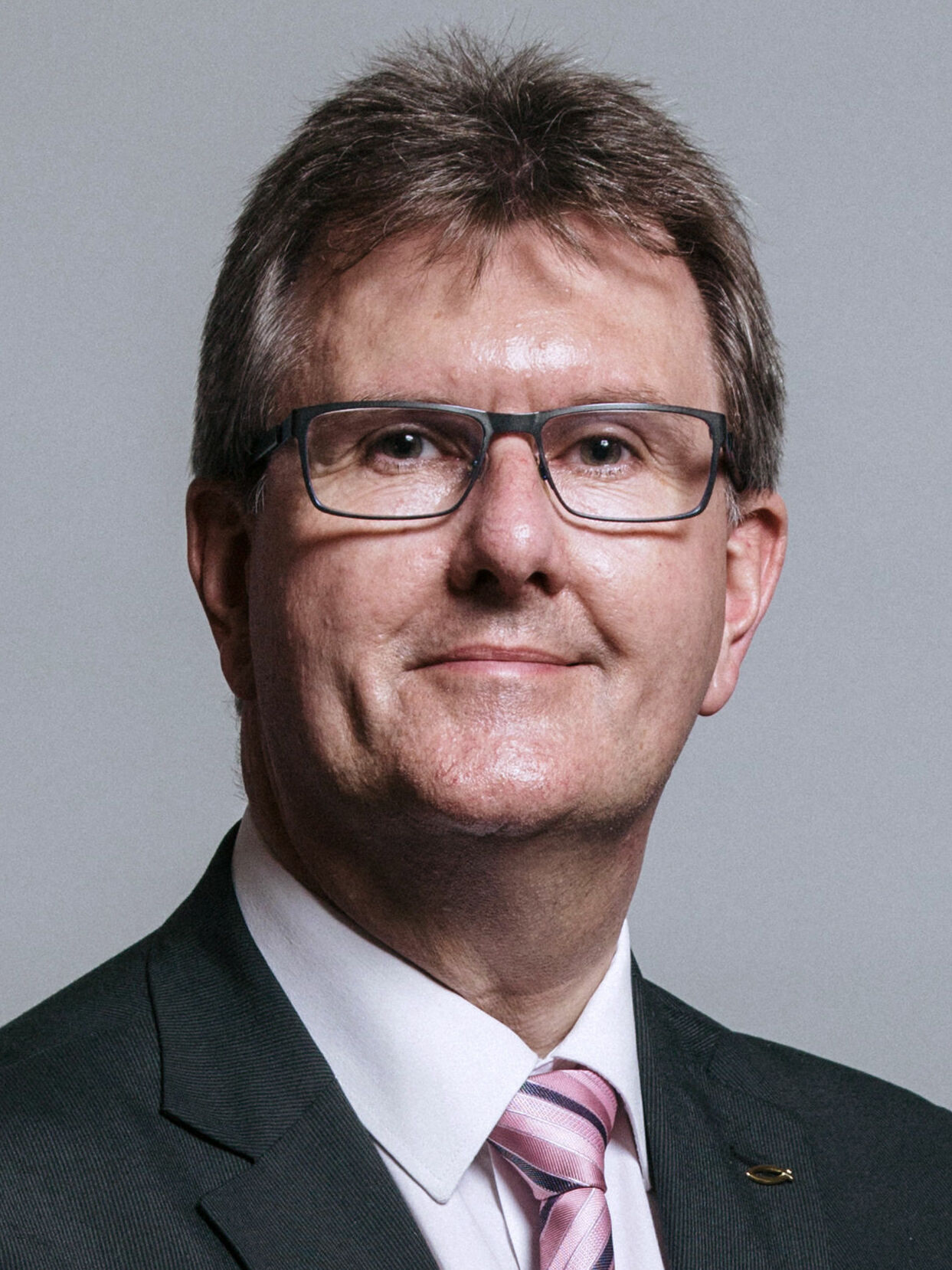

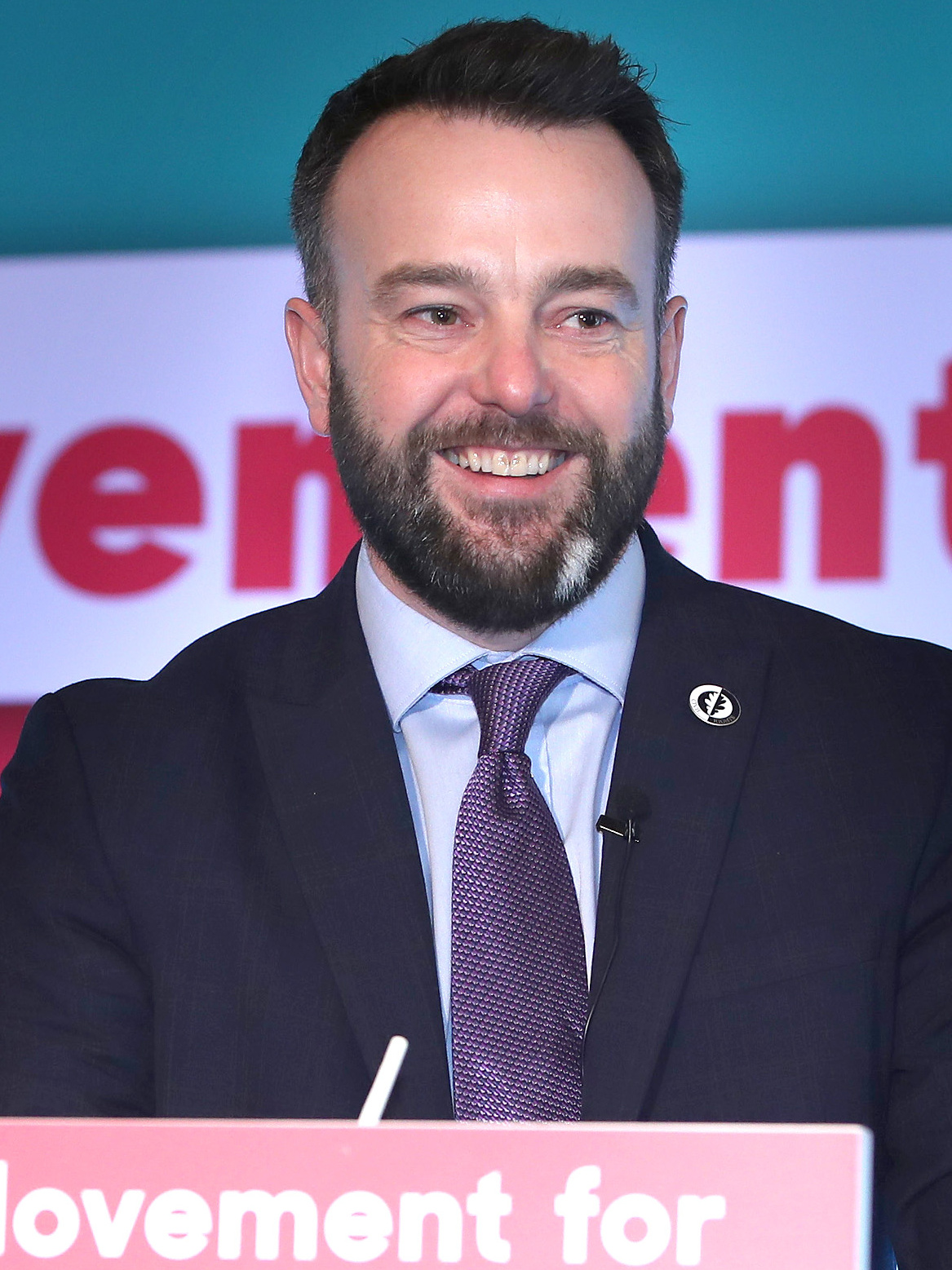

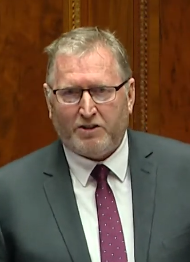
	First party	Second party	Third party
Leader	Michelle O'Neill (Note: The leader of Sinn Féin is Mary Lou McDonald, who sits as a TD in the Irish Dáil Éireann for Dublin Central. O'Neill is the leader of the party in Northern Ireland.)	Jeffrey Donaldson	Colum Eastwood
Party	Sinn Féin	DUP	SDLP
Seats before	17	9	6
Seats won	19	11	5
Seat change	▲2	▲2	▼1
Popular vote	31,834	14,045	5,660
Percentage	47.2%	20.8%	8.4%
Swing	▲7.4%	▼2.4%	▼6.0%
	Fourth party	Fifth party
Leader		Doug Beattie
Party	Independent	UUP
Seats before	2	6
Seats won	3	2
Seat change	▲1	▼4
Popular vote	5,230	4,908
Percentage	7.8%	7.3%
Swing	▲2.0%	▼6.3%
Council control before election
No overall control
Council control after election
No overall control

The 2023 election to Mid Ulster District Council was scheduled and held on 18 May 2023, alongside other local elections in Northern Ireland, two weeks after local elections in England. The Northern Ireland elections were delayed by 2 weeks to avoid overlapping with the coronation of King Charles III.

They returned 40 members to the council via Single Transferable Vote.

== Election results ==
Mid Ulster District Council Election Result 2023
Party	Seats	Gains	Losses	Net gain/loss	Seats %	Votes %	Votes	+/−
Sinn Féin	19	2	0	▲2	47.50	47.16	31,834	▲7.31
DUP	11	2	0	▲2	27.50	20.81	14,045	▼2.37
SDLP	5	1	2	▼1	12.50	8.38	5,660	▼6.02
Independent	3 (a)	1	0	▲1	7.50	7.75	5,230	▲1.96
UUP	2	0	4	▼4	5.00	7.27	4,908	▼6.30
TUV	0	0	0	0	0.00	3.97	2,682	▲3.58
Alliance	0	0	0	0	0.00	2.82	1,904	▲1.59
Aontú	0	0	0	0	0.00	1.44	974	▼0.01
Labour Alternative	0	0	0	0	0.00	0.40	268	New
Total	40						67,505	

Note: "Votes" are the first preference votes.

- (a) The three independents identify themselves as Independent Republican.
- The electorate was 105,819, the turnout 68,361 (64.60%) and there was 856 spoilt votes.

== Districts summary ==
Results of the 2023 Mid Ulster District Council election by district
District Electoral Area (DEA)	%	Cllrs	%	Cllrs	%	Cllrs	%	Cllrs	%	Cllrs	%	Cllrs	%	Cllrs	Total cllrs
District Electoral Area (DEA)	Sinn Féin		DUP		SDLP		UUP		TUV		Alliance		Independents and others		Total cllrs
Carntogher	65.47	4 ▲1	13.69	1	9.39	0 ▼1	0.00	0	6.00	0	0.00	0	5.45	0	5
Clogher Valley	35.79	2	30.04	2	9.74	0 ▼1	11.74	1	0.00	0	0.00	0	12.68	1 ▲1	6
Cookstown	49.99	3	19.61	2 ▲1	7.48	1	11.94	1 ▼1	6.44	0	4.12	0	0.43	0	7
Dungannon	28.39	2 ▲1	28.64	2	6.25	1	5.48	0 ▼1	3.11	0	4.90	0	23.13	1	6
Magherafelt	43.68	2	25.55	2	9.74	1	7.11	0	8.13	0	5.79	0	0.00	0	5
Moyola	57.21	3	17.07	1	7.11	1 ▲1	6.47	0 ▼1	5.67	0	2.70	0	3.79	0	5
Torrent	51.61	3	11.00	1 ▲1	9.04	1	6.72	0 ▼1	0.00	0	2.67	0	18.97	1	6
Total	47.16	19 ▲2	20.81	11 ▲2	8.39	5 ▼1	7.27	2 ▼4	3.97	0	2.82	0	9.59	3 ▲1	40

== District results ==
=== Carntogher ===
2019: 3 x Sinn Féin, 1 x SDLP, 1 x DUP

2023: 4 x Sinn Féin, 1 x DUP

2019–2023 Change: Sinn Féin gain from SDLP

Carntogher - 5 seats
Party	Candidate	FPv%	Count				
Party	Candidate	FPv%	1	2	3	4	5
Sinn Féin	Brian McGuigan*	21.62%	1,909				
Sinn Féin	Sean McPeake*	17.44%	1,540				
Sinn Féin	Paddy Kelly	11.88%	1,049	1,397.26	1,407.10	1,518.10	
Sinn Féin	Córa Corry*	14.53%	1,283	1,335.36	1,381.20	1,472.62	
DUP	Kyle Black*	13.69%	1,209	1,209.00	1,209.04	1,227.04	1,681.04
SDLP	Martin Kearney*	9.39%	829	843.08	847.52	979.00	994.00
TUV	James Artt	6.00%	530	530.00	530.00	533.00	
Aontú	Noreen McEldowney	5.45%	481	486.06	487.38		
Electorate: 12,744 Valid: 8,830 (69.29%) Spoilt: 81 Quota: 1,472 Turnout: 8,911 (69.92%)

=== Clogher Valley ===
2019: 2 x DUP, 2 x Sinn Féin, 1 x UUP, 1 x SDLP

2023: 2 x DUP, 2 x Sinn Féin, 1 x UUP, 1 x Ind (Rep)

2019–2023 Change: Ind (Rep) gain from SDLP

Clogher Valley - 6 seats
Party	Candidate	FPv%	Count				
Party	Candidate	FPv%	1	2	3	4	5
DUP	Frances Burton*	15.43%	1,656				
DUP	Mark Robinson*	14.61%	1,568				
Sinn Féin	Gael Gildernew	13.75%	1,475	1,475.91	1,720.91		
Independent	Kevin McElvogue	12.68%	1,361	1,361.56	1,567.56		
Sinn Féin	Eugene McConnell	11.29%	1,212	1,212.07	1,408.07	1,497.32	1,497.36
UUP	Meta Graham*	11.74%	1,260	1,367.59	1,452.36	1,458.31	1,487.83
Sinn Féin	Sean McGuigan*	10.75%	1,154	1,154.21	1,327.35	1,417.45	1,417.47
SDLP	Sharon McAleer*	9.74%	1,045	1,046.82			
Electorate: 15,846 Valid: 10,731 (67.72%) Spoilt: 108 Quota: 1,534 Turnout: 10,839 (68.40%)

=== Cookstown ===
2019: 3 x Sinn Féin, 2 x UUP, 1 x DUP, 1 x SDLP

2023: 3 x Sinn Féin, 2 x DUP, 1 x UUP, 1 x SDLP

2019–2023 Change: DUP gain from UUP

Cookstown - 7 seats
Party	Candidate	FPv%	Count								
Party	Candidate	FPv%	1	2	3	4	5	6	7	8	9
Sinn Féin	Cathal Mallaghan* †	20.97%	2,157								
Sinn Féin	John McNamee*	17.21%	1,771								
Sinn Féin	Gavin Bell*	11.81%	1,215	2,010.20							
SDLP	Kerri Martin*	7.48%	769	813.80	1,013.00	1,381.48					
DUP	Wilbert Buchanan*	12.14%	1,249	1,249.80	1,249.80	1,250.74	1,252.74	1,252.74	1,360.74		
UUP	Trevor Wilson*	6.82%	702	702.40	702.40	708.04	708.04	712.64	983.27	1,002.87	1,201.33
DUP	Eva Cahoon	7.47%	768	768.00	768.00	769.41	769.41	769.41	843.41	886.81	919.54
TUV	Timothy Hagan	6.44%	663	663.00	663.80	667.56	669.56	670.02	707.02	716.12	740.19
Alliance	Chris Hillcox	4.12%	424	435.60	480.40	569.70	598.25	684.96	711.89	713.29	
UUP	Mark Glasgow*	5.11%	526	527.60	530.00	530.47	531.47	532.39			
Independent	Louise Taylor	0.43%	44	46.40	51.60	62.41					
Electorate: 17,175 Valid: 10,288 (59.90%) Spoilt: 145 Quota: 1,287 Turnout: 10,433 (60.75%)

=== Dungannon ===
2019: 2 x DUP, 1 x Sinn Féin, 1 x UUP, 1 x SDLP, 1 x Independent (Rep)

2023: 2 x DUP, 2 x Sinn Féin, 1 x SDLP, 1 x Independent (Rep)

2019–2023 Change: Sinn Féin gain from UUP

Dungannon - 6 seats
Party	Candidate	FPv%	Count								
Party	Candidate	FPv%	1	2	3	4	5	6	7	8	9
DUP	Clement Cuthbertson*	21.81%	2,096								
Sinn Féin	Dominic Molloy*	15.81%	1,519								
DUP	James Burton	6.83%	656	1,198.30	1,198.57	1,200.57	1,218.57	1,407.57			
Sinn Féin	Deirdre Varsani	12.58%	1,219	1,219.00	1,325.65	1,347.37	1,363.37	1,366.37	1,414.37		
Independent	Barry Monteith*	12.28%	1,180	1,181.02	1,185.70	1,211.79	1,274.79	1,275.79	1,310.88	1,868.88	
SDLP	Karol McQuade	6.25%	601	604.06	615.67	636.12	684.21	687.89	913.92	979.17	1,139.17
UUP	Ian Irwin	5.48%	527	588.54	588.72	589.72	617.46	781.69	907.47	911.47	913.47
Independent	Marian Vincent	6.54%	628	628.00	632.59	654.68	673.77	675.86	699.86		
Alliance	Claire Hackett	4.90%	471	478.14	480.21	489.30	549.98	556.02			
TUV	Kinley Tenner	3.11%	299	385.70	385.88	396.22	398.90				
Labour Alternative	Gerry Cullen	2.79%	268	273.78	274.05	285.39					
Aontú	Denise Mullen*	1.52%	146	147.36	148.98						
Electorate: 16,325 Valid: 9,610 (58.87%) Spoilt: 201 Quota: 1,373 Turnout: 9,811 (60.10%)

=== Magherafelt ===
2019: 2 x Sinn Féin, 2 x DUP, 1 x SDLP

2023: 2 x Sinn Féin, 2 x DUP, 1 x SDLP

2019–2023 Change: No change

Magherafelt - 5 seats
Party	Candidate	FPv%	Count					
Party	Candidate	FPv%	1	2	3	4	5	6
Sinn Féin	Darren Totten*	25.15%	2,077					
Sinn Féin	Sean Clarke*	18.53%	1,530					
SDLP	Christine McFlynn*	9.74%	804	1,336.40	1,457.24			
DUP	Paul McLean*	13.84%	1,143	1,146.96	1,147.68	1,147.92	1,283.92	1,616.92
DUP	Wesley Brown*	11.71%	967	967.88	967.88	967.88	1,230.32	1,526.32
Alliance	Padraic Farrell	5.79%	478	628.04	650.36	706.64	779.92	786.92
TUV	Raymond Love	8.13%	671	673.64	673.88	674.24	767.80	
UUP	Ian Brown	7.11%	587	589.64	589.88	591.20		
Electorate: 13,741 Valid: 8,257 (60.09%) Spoilt: 58 Quota: 1,377 Turnout: 8.315 (60.51%)

=== Moyola ===
2019: 3 x Sinn Féin, 1 x DUP, 1 x UUP

2023: 3 x Sinn Féin, 1 x DUP, 1 x SDLP

2019–2023 Change: SDLP gain from UUP

Moyola - 5 seats
Party	Candidate	FPv%	Count							
Party	Candidate	FPv%	1	2	3	4	5	6	7	8
Sinn Féin	Ian Milne*	24.24%	2,219							
Sinn Féin	Jolene Groogan	20.47%	1,874							
DUP	Anne Forde*	17.07%	1,563							
Sinn Féin	Donal McPeake*	12.50%	1,144	1,775.47						
SDLP	Denise Johnston	7.11%	651	676.73	888.70	1,022.20	1,220.96	1,221.14	1,227.91	1,486.61
UUP	Derek McKinney*	6.47%	592	592.93	594.98	595.88	631.30	658.68	1,108.52	1,112.86
Aontú	Sheila Fullerton	3.79%	347	368.39	445.88	528.98	558.06	558.38	561.46	
TUV	Glenn Moore	5.67%	519	519.31	519.72	519.72	523.43	536.29		
Alliance	Caleb Ross	2.70%	247	251.03	299.82	325.32				
Electorate: 13,524 Valid: 9,156 (67.70%) Spoilt: 90 Quota: 1,527 Turnout: 9,246 (68.37%)

=== Torrent ===
2019: 3 x Sinn Féin, 1 x SDLP, 1 x UUP, 1 x Independent (Rep)

2023: 3 x Sinn Féin, 1 x SDLP, 1 x DUP, 1 x Independent (Rep)

2019–2023 Change: DUP gain from UUP

Torrent - 6 seats
Party	Candidate	FPv%	Count							
Party	Candidate	FPv%	1	2	3	4	5	6	7	8
Sinn Féin	Eimear Carney	15.78%	1,678							
Sinn Féin	Niall McAleer*	15.67%	1,666							
Independent	Dan Kerr*	13.12%	1,395	1,431.00	1,443.69	1,994.96				
DUP	Jonathan Buchanan	11.00%	1,170	1,181.00	1,181.09	1,182.09	1,186.09	1,823.09		
SDLP	Malachy Quinn*	9.04%	961	1,084.00	1,093.63	1,113.90	1,170.90	1,244.90	1,434.90	1,448.42
Sinn Féin	Nuala McLernon	10.79%	1,147	1,161.00	1,182.87	1,195.05	1,243.05	1,243.05	1,245.05	1,349.13
Sinn Féin	Paul Kelly	9.37%	996	1,012.00	1,117.30	1,155.57	1,288.57	1,291.66	1,296.66	1,310.34
UUP	Robert Colvin*	6.72%	714	777.00	777.09	777.09	777.09			
Independent	Teresa Quinn	5.85%	622	628.00	628.90					
Alliance	Simon Graham	2.67%	284							
Electorate: 16,464 Valid: 10,633 (64.58%) Spoilt: 173 Quota: 1,520 Turnout: 10,806 (65.63%)

== Changes during the term ==
=== † Co-options ===
Date co-opted	Electoral Area	Party	Outgoing	Co-optee	Reason
17 July 2024	Cookstown	Sinn Féin	Cathal Mallaghan	Donna Mullin	Cathal Mallaghan elected as the Member of Parliament for Mid Ulster in the 2024 general election.
