= Magherafelt (District Electoral Area) =

Electoral district in Northern Ireland

- Mid Ulster District Council DEA constituency

Current constituency
- Created: 1985
- Seats: 5 (1985-)
- Councillors: Wesley Brown (DUP); Sean Clarke (SF); Christine McFlynn (SDLP); Paul McLean (DUP); Darren Totten (SF)

Magherafelt DEA within Mid Ulster

Magherafelt Town DEA (1993-2014) within Magherafelt

Magherafelt is one of the seven district electoral areas (DEA) in Mid Ulster, Northern Ireland. The district elects five members to Mid Ulster District Council and contains the wards of Coolshinny, Glebe, Lissan, The Loup and Town Parks East. Magherafelt forms part of the Mid Ulster constituencies for the Northern Ireland Assembly and UK Parliament.

It was created for the 1985 local elections, replacing Magherafelt Area C which had existed since 1973. It was called Magherafelt Town until 2014, and originally contained five wards (Ballymaguigan, Knockclogrim, Lecumpter, Town Parks East and Town Parks West). For the 1993 local elections it gained an additional ward, Glebe. For the 2014 local elections it was reduced to five wards.

== Councillors ==
Election	Councillor (Party)	Councillor (Party)	Councillor (Party)	Councillor (Party)	Councillor (Party)	Councillor (Party)
2023	Darren Totten (Sinn Féin)	Sean Clarke (Sinn Féin)	Christine McFlynn (SDLP)	Wesley Brown (DUP)	Paul McLean (DUP)	5 seats 2014–present
2019	Darren Totten (Sinn Féin)	Sean Clarke (Sinn Féin)	Christine McFlynn (SDLP)	Wesley Brown (DUP)	Paul McLean (DUP)	5 seats 2014–present
2014	Darren Totten (Sinn Féin)	Sean Clarke (Sinn Féin)	Christine McFlynn (SDLP)	George Shiels (UUP)	Paul McLean (DUP)	5 seats 2014–present
2011	Peter Bateson (Sinn Féin)	Catherine Elattar (Sinn Féin)	Jim Campbell (SDLP)	George Shiels (UUP)	Paul McLean (DUP)	Deborah Ní Shiadhail (Sinn Féin)
2005	Peter Bateson (Sinn Féin)	Sean McPeake (Sinn Féin)	Jim Campbell (SDLP)	George Shiels (UUP)	Paul McLean (DUP)	William McCrea (DUP)
2001	Seamus O'Brien (Sinn Féin)	John Kelly (Sinn Féin)	Joseph McBride (SDLP)	George Shiels (UUP)	Paul McLean (DUP)	William McCrea (DUP)
1997	Seamus O'Brien (Sinn Féin)	Patrick Kilpatrick (SDLP)	Joseph McBride (SDLP)	George Shiels (UUP)	Paul McLean (DUP)	William McCrea (DUP)
1993	John Hurl (Sinn Féin)	Patrick Kilpatrick (SDLP)	Joseph McBride (SDLP)	Ernest Caldwell (UUP)	Paul McLean (DUP)	William McCrea (DUP)
1989	John Hurl (Sinn Féin)	Patrick Kilpatrick (SDLP)	5 seats 1985–1993	Ernest Caldwell (UUP)	Paul McLean (DUP)	William McCrea (DUP)
1985	Bhrighde Mac Giolla (Sinn Féin)	Patrick Kilpatrick (SDLP)	5 seats 1985–1993	Ernest Caldwell (UUP)	Barclay Morrow (DUP)	William McCrea (DUP)

== 2023 Election ==
2019: 2 x Sinn Féin, 2 x DUP, 1 x SDLP

2023: 2 x Sinn Féin, 2 x DUP, 1 x SDLP

2019–2023 Change: No change

Magherafelt - 5 seats
Party	Candidate	FPv%	Count					
Party	Candidate	FPv%	1	2	3	4	5	6
Sinn Féin	Darren Totten*	25.15%	2,077					
Sinn Féin	Sean Clarke*	18.53%	1,530					
SDLP	Christine McFlynn*	9.74%	804	1,336.40	1,457.24			
DUP	Paul McLean*	13.84%	1,143	1,146.96	1,147.68	1,147.92	1,283.92	1,616.92
DUP	Wesley Brown*	11.71%	967	967.88	967.88	967.88	1,230.32	1,526.32
Alliance	Padraic Farrell	5.79%	478	628.04	650.36	706.64	779.92	786.92
TUV	Raymond Love	8.13%	671	673.64	673.88	674.24	767.80	
UUP	Ian Brown	7.11%	587	589.64	589.88	591.20		
Electorate: 13,741 Valid: 8,257 (60.09%) Spoilt: 58 Quota: 1,377 Turnout: 8.315 (60.51%)

== 2019 Election ==
2014: 2 x Sinn Féin, 1 x DUP, 1 x SDLP, 1 x UUP

2019: 2 x Sinn Féin, 2 x DUP, 1 x SDLP

2014–2019 Change: DUP gain from UUP

Magherafelt – 5 seats
Party	Candidate	FPv%	Count			
Party	Candidate	FPv%	1	2	3	4
Sinn Féin	Darren Totten*	22.02%	1,665			
SDLP	Christine McFlynn*	15.95%	1,206	1,320		
Sinn Féin	Sean Clarke*	13.99%	1,058	1,107	1,500.75	
DUP	Wesley Brown	16.11%	1,218	1,220	1,221	1,224
DUP	Paul McLean*	15.91%	1,203	1,208	1,209.25	1,214.75
UUP	George Shiels*	13.17%	996	1,001	1,001.75	1,022.25
Aontú	Kevin Donnelly	2.83%	214			
Electorate: 13,112 Valid: 7,560 (57.66%) Spoilt: 86 Quota: 1,261 Turnout: 7,646 (58.31%)

== 2014 Election ==
2011: 3 x Sinn Féin, 1 x DUP, 1 x SDLP, 1 x UUP

2014: 2 x Sinn Féin, 1 x DUP, 1 x SDLP, 1 x UUP

2011-2014 Change: Sinn Féin loss due to the reduction of one seat

Magherafelt - 5 seats
Party	Candidate	FPv%	Count					
Party	Candidate	FPv%	1	2	3	4	5	6
DUP	Paul McLean*	15.84%	1,106	1,135	1,144	1,163	1,167	
UUP	George Shiels*	11.24%	785	803	809	834	841	1,225
Sinn Féin	Seán Clarke*	15.68%	1,095	1,095	1,101	1,132	1,147	1,147
SDLP	Christine McFlynn*	10.30%	719	724	756	822	1,116	1,119
Sinn Féin	Darren Totten*	13.96%	975	976	1,008	1,041	1,110	1,110
TUV	Gareth Ferguson	10.74%	750	786	791	806	808	1,001
DUP	Ross Mitchell	8.98%	627	635	635	641	642	
SDLP	Ben Niblock	5.18%	362	364	391	436		
Independent	Hugh McCloy	3.31%	231	240	310			
Independent	Michael Kelly	3.08%	215	220				
Independent	Robert Kelly*	1.69%	118					
Electorate: 12,483 Valid: 6,983 (55.94%) Spoilt: 119 Quota: 1,164 Turnout: 7,102 (56.89%)

== 2011 Election ==
2005: 2 x Sinn Féin, 2 x DUP, 1 x SDLP, 1 x UUP

2011: 3 x Sinn Féin, 1 x DUP, 1 x SDLP, 1 x UUP

2005-2011 Change: Sinn Féin gain from DUP

Magherafelt Town - 6 seats
Party	Candidate	FPv%	Count					
Party	Candidate	FPv%	1	2	3	4	5	6
Sinn Féin	Peter Bateson*	23.66%	1,616					
DUP	Paul McLean*	15.72%	1,074					
SDLP	Jim Campbell*	12.43%	849	900.6	901.32	1,191.32		
UUP	George Shiels*	10.16%	694	694	712.27	718.67	733.67	990.07
Sinn Féin	Deborah Ní Shiadhail	11.77%	804	894.4	894.4	925.8	969.8	970.8
Sinn Féin	Catherine Elattar	5.99%	409	871	871	890.8	946.8	949.8
TUV	Alan Dickson	8.45%	577	577	583.57	584.97	585.97	704.97
DUP	Wesley Brown	6.59%	450	451.2	519.24	520.42	526.42	
SDLP	Denise Johnston	5.24%	358	382.8	383.07			
Electorate: 11,154 Valid: 6,831 (61.24%) Spoilt: 137 Quota: 976 Turnout: 6,968 (62.47%)

== 2005 Election ==
2001: 2 x DUP, 2 x Sinn Féin, 1 x SDLP, 1 x UUP

2005: 3 x DUP, 1 x Sinn Féin, 1 x SDLP, 1 x UUP

2001-2005 Change: No change

Magherafelt Town - 6 seats
Party	Candidate	FPv%	Count					
Party	Candidate	FPv%	1	2	3	4	5	6
DUP	William McCrea*	31.69%	2,286					
Sinn Féin	Peter Bateson	17.61%	1,270					
DUP	Paul McLean*	3.47%	250	1,395.76				
UUP	George Shiels*	9.58%	691	773.88	1,124.12			
Sinn Féin	Sean McPeake	11.73%	846	846.56	846.78	927.15	927.15	1,300.15
SDLP	Jim Campbell	12.99%	937	941.48	949.84	959.34	1,009.5	1,034.37
SDLP	Brendan Scott	7.26%	524	525.12	528.42	532.79	574.97	604.03
Sinn Féin	Seamus O'Brien*	5.67%	409	409	409.44	553.84	554.03	
Electorate: 10,439 Valid: 7,213 (69.10%) Spoilt: 129 Quota: 1,031 Turnout: 7,342 (70.33%)

== 2001 Election ==
1997: 2 x Sinn Féin, 2 x DUP, 1 x SDLP, 1 x UUP

2001: 2 x Sinn Féin, 2 x DUP, 1 x SDLP, 1 x UUP

1997-2001 Change: No change

Magherafelt Town - 6 seats
Party	Candidate	FPv%	Count			
Party	Candidate	FPv%	1	2	3	4
DUP	William McCrea*	28.10%	2,255			
Sinn Féin	John Kelly*	21.18%	1,700			
UUP	George Shiels*	13.74%	1,103	1,213.5		
DUP	Paul McLean*	2.45%	197	1,190.5		
Sinn Féin	Seamus O'Brien*	13.52%	1,085	1,085.5	1,538.59	
SDLP	Joseph McBride*	12.33%	990	992	1,061.96	1,258.64
SDLP	Frances Symington	8.67%	696	697.5	716.97	815.64
Electorate: 10,509 Valid: 8,026 (76.37%) Spoilt: 127 Quota: 1,147 Turnout: 8,153 (77.58%)

== 1997 Election ==
1993: 2 x DUP, 2 x SDLP, 1 x Sinn Féin, 1 x UUP

1997: 2 x DUP, 2 x SDLP, 1 x Sinn Féin, 1 x UUP

1993-1997 Change: No change

Magherafelt Town - 6 seats
Party	Candidate	FPv%	Count			
Party	Candidate	FPv%	1	2	3	4
DUP	William McCrea*	37.50%	2,675			
Sinn Féin	Seamus O'Brien	24.91%	1,777			
SDLP	Patrick Kilpatrick*	16.11%	1,149			
DUP	Paul McLean*	1.50%	107	1,551.6		
SDLP	Joseph McBride*	7.00%	499	499.62	1,184.76	
UUP	George Shiels	11.44%	816	1,007.58	1,008.15	1,514.25
Independent Labour	Harry Hutchinson	1.02%	73	78.58	101.95	114.25
Workers' Party	Marian Donnelly	0.52%	37	38.24	80.42	81.92
Electorate: 10,104 Valid: 7,133 (70.60%) Spoilt: 89 Quota: 1,019 Turnout: 7,222 (71.48%)

== 1993 Election ==
1989: 2 x DUP, 1 x SDLP, 1 x UUP, 1 x Sinn Féin

1993: 2 x DUP, 2 x SDLP, 1 x UUP, 1 x Sinn Féin

1989-1993 Change: SDLP gain due to the addition of one seat

Magherafelt Town - 6 seats
Party	Candidate	FPv%	Count		
Party	Candidate	FPv%	1	2	3
DUP	William McCrea*	31.73%	2,142		
SDLP	Patrick Kilpatrick*	21.11%	1,425		
Sinn Féin	John Hurl*	16.50%	1,114		
UUP	Ernest Caldwell*	13.79%	931	1,088.3	
SDLP	Joseph McBride	10.65%	719	720.65	1,173.53
DUP	Paul McLean*	1.30%	88	950.75	960.09
UUP	George Shiels	4.44%	300	380.85	382.21
DUP	Daniel McAllister	0.47%	32	85.35	88.41
Electorate: 9,376 Valid: 6,751 (72.00%) Spoilt: 131 Quota: 965 Turnout: 6,882 (73.40%)

== 1989 Election ==
1985: 2 x DUP, 1 x SDLP, 1 x UUP, 1 x Sinn Féin

1989: 2 x DUP, 1 x SDLP, 1 x UUP, 1 x Sinn Féin

1985-1989 Change: No change

Magherafelt Town - 5 seats
Party	Candidate	FPv%	Count			
Party	Candidate	FPv%	1	2	3	4
DUP	William McCrea*	34.33%	2,162			
SDLP	Patrick Kilpatrick*	20.17%	1,270			
UUP	Ernest Caldwell*	18.55%	1,168			
DUP	Paul McLean	2.38%	150	1,248.24		
Sinn Féin	John Hurl	15.93%	1,003	1,003	1,021	1,034.26
SDLP	Margaret O'Hagan	7.27%	458	459.04	648.76	713.06
Workers' Party	Marian Donnelly	1.38%	87	90.12	101.1	
Electorate: 8,585 Valid: 6,298 (73.36%) Spoilt: 123 Quota: 1,050 Turnout: 6,421 (74.79%)

== 1985 Election ==
1985: 2 x DUP, 1 x SDLP, 1 x UUP, 1 x Sinn Féin

Magherafelt Town - 5 seats
Party	Candidate	FPv%	Count			
Party	Candidate	FPv%	1	2	3	4
DUP	William McCrea*	32.24%	2,050			
Sinn Féin	Bhrighde Mac Giolla	20.40%	1,297			
SDLP	Patrick Kilpatrick	16.80%	1,068			
UUP	Ernest Caldwell	13.38%	851	975.32	976.34	1,367.34
DUP	Barclay Morrow	2.28%	145	956.68	957.02	1,031.74
SDLP	Joseph McGlone	6.35%	404	406.4	616.86	687.1
UUP	James Artt	5.21%	331	367.48	367.82	
Alliance	Harold Hutchinson	3.35%	213	218.28	238	
Electorate: 8,009 Valid: 6,359 (79.40%) Spoilt: 81 Quota: 1,060 Turnout: 6,440 (80.41%)
