= 1993 Magherafelt District Council election =

Local govt election in Northern Ireland

← 1989	19 May 1993	1997 →

All 16 seats to Magherafelt District Council 9 seats needed for a majority
	First party	Second party	Third party
Party	SDLP	Sinn Féin	DUP
Seats won	5	4	4
Seat change	▲1	▲1	▲1
	Fourth party	Fifth party
Party	UUP	Ind. Nationalist
Seats won	3	0
Seat change	▼1	▼1
- Party with the most votes by district.

Elections to Magherafelt District Council were held on 19 May 1993 on the same day as the other Northern Irish local government elections. The election used three district electoral areas to elect a total of 16 councillors.

== Election results ==
Magherafelt District Council Election Result 1993
Party	Seats	Gains	Losses	Net gain/loss	Seats %	Votes %	Votes	+/−
SDLP	5	1	0	▲1	31.3	32.9	6,137	▲6.2
Sinn Féin	4	1	0	▲1	25.0	23.5	4,392	▲1.4
DUP	4	1	0	▲1	25.0	21.4	3,989	▼2.0
UUP	3	0	1	▼1	18.8	20.3	3,781	▼0.4
Workers' Party	0	0	0	0	0.0	1.9	363	▼1.4

Note: "Votes" are the first preference votes.

== Districts summary ==
Results of the Magherafelt District Council election, 1993 by district
Ward	%	Cllrs	%	Cllrs	%	Cllrs	%	Cllrs	%	Cllrs	Total Cllrs
Ward	SDLP		Sinn Féin		DUP		UUP		Others		Total Cllrs
Magherafelt Town	31.8	2	16.5	1	33.5	2	18.2	1	0.0	0	6
Moyola	26.8	1	21.5	1	23.4	2	25.9	1	2.4	0	5
Sperrin	39.8	2	33.1	2	6.2	0	17.3	1	3.6	0	5
Total	32.9	5	23.5	4	21.4	4	20.3	3	1.9	0	16

== District results ==
=== Magherafelt Town ===
1989: 2 x DUP, 1 x SDLP, 1 x UUP, 1 x Sinn Féin
1993: 2 x DUP, 2 x SDLP, 1 x UUP, 1 x Sinn Féin
1989-1993 Change: SDLP gain due to the addition of one seat

Magherafelt Town - 6 seats
Party	Candidate	FPv%	Count		
Party	Candidate	FPv%	1	2	3
DUP	William McCrea*	31.73%	2,142		
SDLP	Patrick Kilpatrick*	21.11%	1,425		
Sinn Féin	John Hurl*	16.50%	1,114		
UUP	Ernest Caldwell*	13.79%	931	1,088.3	
SDLP	Joseph McBride	10.65%	719	720.65	1,173.53
DUP	Paul McLean*	1.30%	88	950.75	960.09
UUP	George Shiels	4.44%	300	380.85	382.21
DUP	Daniel McAllister	0.47%	32	85.35	88.41
Electorate: 9,376 Valid: 6,751 (72.00%) Spoilt: 131 Quota: 965 Turnout: 6,882 (73.40%)

=== Moyola ===
1989: 2 x UUP, 1 x Sinn Féin, 1 x DUP, 1 x SDLP
1993: 2 x DUP, 1 x Sinn Féin, 1 x UUP, 1 x SDLP
1989-1993 Change: Sinn Féin gain from DUP

Moyola - 5 seats
Party	Candidate	FPv%	Count						
Party	Candidate	FPv%	1	2	3	4	5	6	7
SDLP	Patrick McErlean	22.21%	1,276						
Sinn Féin	Margaret McKenna*	13.61%	782	797.34	812.42	1,204.84			
UUP	John Junkin*	14.46%	831	831	838	838	838	1,307.26	
DUP	Thomas Catherwood*	11.68%	671	671	674	674	674	780	994.05
DUP	Thomas Wilson	11.70%	672	672	672.26	672.26	672.26	745.26	834.06
SDLP	Francis Madden	4.56%	262	529.54	610.46	642.14	720.8	720.8	723.02
UUP	Norman Montgomery*	11.40%	655	655.26	658.26	658.26	658.26		
Sinn Féin	Paul Henry	7.90%	454	465.44	476				
Workers' Party	Patrick Scullion	2.47%	142	164.52					
Electorate: 7,935 Valid: 5,745 (72.40%) Spoilt: 179 Quota: 958 Turnout: 5,924 (74.66%)

=== Sperrin ===
1989: 2 x SDLP, 1 x Sinn Féin, 1 x UUP, 1 x Independent Nationalist
1993: 2 x SDLP, 2 x Sinn Féin, 1 x UUP
1989-1993 Change: Sinn Féin from Independent Nationalist

Sperrin - 5 seats
Party	Candidate	FPv%	Count		
Party	Candidate	FPv%	1	2	3
Sinn Féin	Patrick Groogan	20.18%	1,244		
UUP	Robert Montgomery*	17.26%	1,064		
SDLP	Kathleen Lagan	15.16%	935	950.3	1,090.64
Sinn Féin	John Walsh	12.94%	798	967.2	990.18
SDLP	Ghislaine O'Keeney*	14.08%	868	882.94	915.3
SDLP	Francis McKendry	10.57%	652	654.88	689.78
DUP	Wesley Brown	6.23%	384	384.18	
Workers' Party	Francis Donnelly	3.58%	221	227.84	
Electorate: 8,201 Valid: 6,166 (75.19%) Spoilt: 134 Quota: 1,028 Turnout: 6,300 (76.82%)
