= Northern Ireland Assembly Committee on Standards and Privileges =

The Northern Ireland Committee on Standards and Privileges is appointed by the Northern Ireland Assembly to oversee the work of the Commissioner for Standards at the Northern Ireland Assembly.

== History ==
The committee was created in 1999 as implementation of schedule 6 the Northern Ireland Act 1998: "preventing conduct which would constitute a criminal offence or contempt of court" and a "a sub judice rule." Following the Belfast Agreement, a committee on standards and privileges was established under the standing orders of the Northern Ireland Assembly.

== Membership ==
Membership of the committee is as follows:

Party	Member	Constituency
Sinn Féin	Cathy Mason MLA (Chairperson)	South Down
Alliance	Connie Egan MLA (Deputy Chairperson)	North Down
Alliance	Stewart Dickson MLA	East Antrim
Sinn Féin	Jemma Dolan MLA	Fermanagh and South Tyrone
SDLP	Mark H. Durkan MLA	Foyle
DUP	Paul Frew MLA	North Antrim
DUP	Harry Harvey MLA	Mid Ulster
DUP	Brian Kingston MLA	Belfast North
Sinn Féin	Declan McAleer MLA	West Tyrone

== 2022–2027 Assembly ==
Party	Member	Constituency
Sinn Féin	Carál Ní Chuilín MLA (Chairperson)	Belfast North
Alliance	Stewart Dickson MLA (Deputy Chairperson)	East Antrim
Sinn Féin	Jemma Dolan MLA	Fermanagh and South Tyrone
DUP	Stephen Dunne MLA	North Down
Alliance	Connie Egan MLA	North Down
DUP	Paul Frew MLA	North Antrim
DUP	Harry Harvey MLA	Mid Ulster
Sinn Féin	Cathy Mason MLA	South Down
SDLP	Colin McGrath MLA	South Down

=== Changes 2022–2027 ===
Date	Outgoing member and party	Constituency	→	New member and party	Constituency
8 April 2024	Stephen Dunne MLA (DUP)	Lagan Valley	→	Brian Kingston MLA (DUP)	Belfast North
8 November 2024	Stewart Dickson MLA (Deputy Chairperson, Alliance)	East Antrim	→	Connie Egan MLA (Deputy Chairperson, Alliance)	North Down
3 February 2025	Carál Ní Chuilín MLA (Chairperson, Sinn Féin)	Belfast North	→	Cathy Mason MLA (Chairperson, Sinn Féin)	South Down
10 February 2025	Carál Ní Chuilín MLA (Sinn Féin)	Belfast North	→	Declan McAleer MLA (Sinn Féin)	West Tyrone
8 September 2025	Colin McGrath MLA (SDLP)	South Down	→	Mark H. Durkan MLA (SDLP)	Foyle

== 2017–2022 Assembly ==
Party	Member	Constituency
Sinn Féin	Sinéad Ennis MLA (Chairperson)	South Down
DUP	William Irwin MLA (Deputy Chairperson)	Newry and Armagh
UUP	Doug Beattie MLA	Upper Bann
DUP	Pam Cameron MLA	South Antrim
Alliance	Stewart Dickson MLA	East Antrim
Sinn Féin	Colm Gildernew MLA	Fermanagh and South Tyrone
Sinn Féin	Declan McAleer MLA	West Tyrone
SDLP	Patsy McGlone MLA	Mid Ulster
DUP	George Robinson MLA	East Londonderry

=== Changes 2017–2022 ===
Date	Outgoing member and party	Constituency	→	New member and party	Constituency
6 July 2020	Doug Beattie MLA (UUP)	Upper Bann	→	John Stewart MLA (UUP)	East Antrim
5 October 2020	Colm Gildernew MLA (Sinn Féin)	Fermanagh and South Tyrone	→	Seán Lynch MLA (Sinn Féin)	Fermanagh and South Tyrone
19 October 2020	John Stewart MLA (UUP)	East Antrim	→	Steve Aiken MLA (UUP)	South Antrim
14 June 2021	William Irwin MLA (Deputy Chairperson, DUP)	Newry and Armagh	→	Christopher Stalford MLA (Deputy Chairperson, DUP)	Belfast South
2 July 2021	Seán Lynch MLA (Sinn Féin)	Fermanagh and South Tyrone	→	Vacant	
20 September 2021	Sinéad Ennis MLA (Chairperson, Sinn Féin)	South Down	→	Linda Dillon MLA (Chairperson, Sinn Féin)	Mid Ulster
27 September 2021	George Robinson MLA (DUP)	East Londonderry	→	Sinéad Bradley MLA (SDLP)	South Down
27 September 2021	Vacant		→	Áine Murphy MLA (Sinn Féin)	Fermanagh and South Tyrone
20 February 2022	Christopher Stalford MLA (DUP)	Belfast South	→	Vacant	

== 2016–2017 Assembly ==
Party	Member	Constituency
Sinn Féin	Cathal Boylan MLA (Chairperson)	Newry and Armagh
DUP	Adrian McQuillan MLA (Deputy Chairperson)	East Londonderry
UUP	Doug Beattie MLA	Upper Bann
Alliance	Paula Bradshaw MLA	Belfast South
DUP	Joanne Bunting MLA	Belfast East
People Before Profit	Gerry Carroll MLA	Belfast West
Sinn Féin	Linda Dillon MLA	Mid Ulster
DUP	Sammy Douglas MLA	Belfast East
DUP	Emma Little-Pengelly MLA	Belfast South
Sinn Féin	Seán Lynch MLA	Fermanagh and South Tyrone
SDLP	Richie McPhillips MLA	Fermanagh and South Tyrone

=== Changes 2016–2017 ===
None

== 2011–2016 Assembly ==
Party	Member	Constituency
DUP	Alastair Ross MLA (Chairperson)	East Antrim
Alliance	Kieran McCarthy MLA (Deputy Chairperson)	Strangford
Green (NI)	Steven Agnew MLA	North Down
DUP	Paula Bradley MLA	Belfast North
Sinn Féin	Cathal Boylan MLA	Newry and Armagh
UUP	Michael Copeland MLA	Belfast East
DUP	Jonathan Craig MLA	Lagan Valley
Sinn Féin	Pat Doherty MLA	West Tyrone
Sinn Féin	Fra McCann MLA	Belfast West
SDLP	Patsy McGlone MLA	Mid Ulster
DUP	David McIlveen MLA	North Antrim

=== Changes 2011–2016 ===
Date	Outgoing member and party	Constituency	→	New member and party	Constituency
26 September 2011	Michael Copeland MLA (UUP)	Belfast East	→	Sandra Overend MLA (UUP)	Mid Ulster
23 April 2012	Patsy McGlone MLA (SDLP)	Mid Ulster	→	Colum Eastwood MLA (SDLP)	Foyle
2 July 2012	Pat Doherty MLA (Sinn Féin)	West Tyrone	→	Alex Maskey MLA (Sinn Féin)	Belfast South
10 September 2012	Alex Maskey MLA (Sinn Féin)	Belfast South	→	Francie Molloy MLA (Sinn Féin)	Mid Ulster
3 December 2012	Paula Bradley MLA (DUP)	Belfast North	→	Ian McCrea MLA (DUP)	Mid Ulster
15 April 2013	Francie Molloy MLA (Sinn Féin)	Mid Ulster	→	Declan McAleer MLA (Sinn Féin)	West Tyrone
15 April 2013	Jonathan Craig MLA (DUP)	Lagan Valley	→	Paula Bradley MLA (DUP)	Belfast North
7 May 2013	David McIlveen MLA (DUP)	North Antrim	→	Sydney Anderson MLA (DUP)	Upper Bann
16 September 2013	Sydney Anderson MLA (DUP)	Upper Bann	→	Mervyn Storey MLA (DUP)	North Antrim
30 September 2013	Kieran McCarthy MLA (Deputy Chairperson, Alliance)	Strangford	→	Anna Lo MLA (Deputy Chairperson, Alliance)	Belfast South
6 October 2014	Paula Bradley MLA (DUP)	Belfast North	→	David Hilditch MLA (DUP)	East Antrim
6 October 2014	Mervyn Storey MLA (DUP)	North Antrim	→	Robin Newton MLA (DUP)	Belfast East
8 December 2014	Ian McCrea MLA (DUP)	Mid Ulster	→	Sammy Douglas MLA (DUP)	Belfast East
10 December 2014	Alastair Ross MLA (Chairperson, DUP)	East Antrim	→	Jimmy Spratt MLA (Chairperson, DUP)	Belfast South
18 May 2015	Sammy Douglas MLA (DUP)	Belfast East	→	Tom Buchanan MLA (DUP)	West Tyrone
28 September 2015	Jimmy Spratt MLA (Chairperson, DUP)	Belfast South	→	Paul Givan MLA (Chairperson, DUP)	Lagan Valley
5 October 2015	Tom Buchanan MLA (DUP)	West Tyrone	→	Gordon Dunne MLA (DUP)	North Down
11 January 2016	Colum Eastwood MLA (SDLP)	Foyle	→	Gerard Diver MLA (SDLP)	Foyle

== 2007–2011 Assembly ==
Party	Member	Constituency
SDLP	Carmel Hanna MLA (Chairperson)	Belfast South
Sinn Féin	Gerry McHugh MLA (Deputy Chairperson)	Fermanagh and South Tyrone
DUP	Allan Bresland MLA	West Tyrone
Sinn Féin	Willie Clarke MLA	South Down
UUP	Robert Coulter MLA	North Antrim
DUP	Alex Easton MLA	North Down
DUP	David Hilditch MLA	East Antrim
DUP	Adrian McQuillan MLA	East Londonderry
Sinn Féin	Francie Molloy MLA	Mid Ulster
UUP	George Savage MLA	Upper Bann
Green (NI)	Brian Wilson MLA	North Down

=== Changes 2007–2011 ===
Date	Outgoing member and party	Constituency	→	New member and party	Constituency
29 May 2007	Adrian McQuillan MLA (DUP)	East Londonderry	→	Alastair Ross MLA (DUP)	East Antrim
20 January 2008	Gerry McHugh MLA (Deputy Chairperson, Sinn Féin)	Fermanagh and South Tyrone	→	Willie Clarke MLA (Deputy Chairperson, Sinn Féin)	South Down
27 January 2008	Gerry McHugh MLA (Sinn Féin)	Fermanagh and South Tyrone	→	Claire McGill MLA (Sinn Féin)	West Tyrone
20 May 2008	Paul Maskey MLA (Sinn Féin)	Belfast West	→	Claire McGill MLA (Sinn Féin)	West Tyrone
15 September 2008	Alex Easton MLA (DUP)	North Down	→	Jonathan Craig MLA (DUP)	Lagan Valley
3 July 2009	Carmel Hanna MLA (Chairperson, SDLP)	Belfast South	→	Declan O'Loan MLA (Chairperson, SDLP)	North Antrim
14 September 2009	Jonathan Craig MLA (DUP)	Lagan Valley	→	Tom Buchanan MLA (DUP)	West Tyrone
14 September 2009	David Hilditch MLA (DUP)	East Antrim	→	Trevor Clarke MLA (DUP)	South Antrim
11 December 2009	Francis Brolly MLA (Sinn Féin)	East Londonderry	→	Vacant	
11 January 2010	Vacant		→	Billy Leonard MLA (Sinn Féin)	East Londonderry
20 April 2010	Billy Leonard MLA (Sinn Féin)	East Londonderry	→	Mickey Brady MLA (Sinn Féin)	Newry and Armagh
31 May 2010	Declan O'Loan MLA (Chairperson, SDLP)	North Antrim	→	Pat Ramsey MLA (Chairperson, SDLP)	Foyle
25 June 2010	Pat Ramsey MLA (Chairperson, SDLP)	Foyle	→	Declan O'Loan MLA (Chairperson, SDLP)	North Antrim
14 September 2010	Allan Bresland MLA (DUP)	West Tyrone	→	Sydney Anderson MLA (DUP)	Upper Bann
14 September 2010	Tom Buchanan MLA (DUP)	West Tyrone	→	Paul Frew MLA (DUP)	North Antrim
14 September 2010	Trevor Clarke MLA (DUP)	South Antrim	→	Ian McCrea MLA (DUP)	Mid Ulster
2 November 2010	George Savage MLA (UUP)	Upper Bann	→	Billy Armstrong MLA (UUP)	Mid Ulster

== 1998–2003 Assembly ==
Party	Member	Constituency
SDLP	Donovan McClelland MLA (Chairperson)	South Antrim
UUP	Ian Adamson MLA	Belfast East
UUP	Roy Beggs Jr MLA	East Antrim
SDLP	Arthur Doherty MLA	East Londonderry
UUP	John Gorman MLA	North Down
Alliance	Kieran McCarthy MLA	Strangford
Sinn Féin	Pat McNamee MLA	Newry and Armagh
SDLP	Danny O'Connor MLA	East Antrim
Sinn Féin	Dara O'Hagan MLA	Upper Bann
DUP	Edwin Poots MLA	Lagan Valley
DUP	Jim Wells MLA	South Down

=== Changes 1998–2003 ===
Date	Outgoing member and party	Constituency	→	New member and party	Constituency
11 September 2000	Edwin Poots MLA (DUP)	Lagan Valley	→	Paul Berry MLA (DUP)	Newry and Armagh
6 March 2002	Roy Beggs Jr MLA (UUP)	East Antrim	→	Derek Hussey MLA (Deputy Chairperson, UUP)	West Tyrone
1 July 2002	Pat McNamee MLA (Sinn Féin)	Newry and Armagh	→	Mick Murphy MLA (Sinn Féin)	South Down
16 September 2002	Arthur Doherty MLA (SDLP)	East Londonderry	→	Michael Coyle MLA (SDLP)	East Londonderry
