= 1902 South Down by-election =

UK Parliamentary by-election

The February 1902 South Down by-election was held on 19 February 1902. The by-election was held following the resignation of the previous member Michael McCartan who was a member of the Irish Parliamentary Party. It was won unopposed by the Irish Parliamentary Party candidate Jeremiah McVeagh.

== Result ==
1902 South Down by-election
Party	Candidate	Votes	%	±%
Irish Parliamentary	Jeremiah McVeagh	Unopposed		
Registered electors				
Irish Parliamentary hold				
