= Emma Rogan =

Northern Irish politician (born 1986)

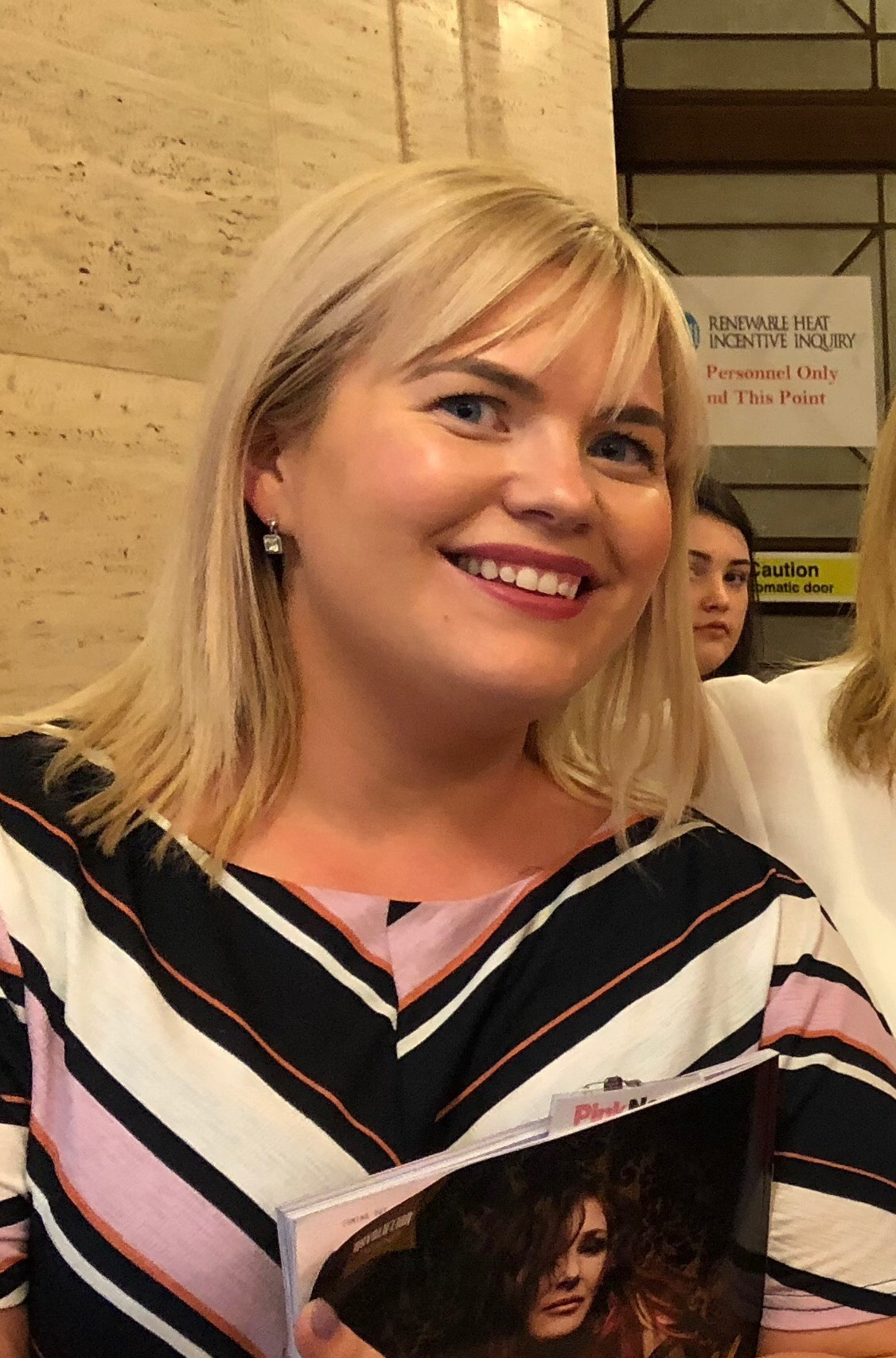

Member of the Legislative Assembly for South Down
- In office 20 June 2017 – 28 March 2022
- Preceded by: Chris Hazzard
- Succeeded by: Cathy Mason

Personal details
- Born: 27 June 1986 (age 39)
- Party: Sinn Féin

Emma Rogan (born 27 June 1986) is a former Sinn Féin politician from Loughinisland, County Down, in Northern Ireland. She attended St Colmcille's High School, Crossgar.

She served as a Member of the Legislative Assembly (MLA) for the South Down constituency in the Northern Ireland Assembly from June 2017 to 2022.

Rogan was co-opted to the Assembly to replace Chris Hazzard, a Sinn Féin MLA and former Minister for Infrastructure. Hazzard was elected at the June 2017 Westminster election as the Member of Parliament (MP) for South Down. Sinn Féin's South Down cumann then selected Rogan to fill his place.

On her selection as MLA, Rogan described herself "a Loughinisland woman through and through", but that she would be "an MLA for all of South Down". She said that her initial priorities included protecting services in the Downe Hospital in Downpatrick, and "to restore Downpatrick as a thriving county town".

In May 2021, Sinn Féin announced its two candidates for South Down at the 2022 Northern Ireland Assembly election. Rogan was not one of the two, having been deselected in favour of Councillor Cathy Mason.

In March 2022, the Belfast Telegraph reported that Rogan had not spoken in the Assembly for over a year. In the same period she had attended no meeting of two committees on which she sat, missing 45 meetings of the Justice Committee and 13 meetings of the Audit Committee. Rogan did not respond to queries from the Belfast Telegraph.

== Loughinisland Justice campaign ==
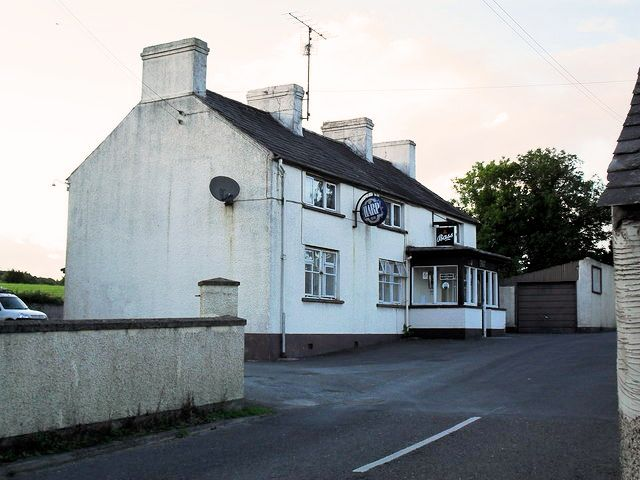
The scene of the massacre

In June 1994, Rogan was 7 years old when her 34-year-old father Adrian Rogan was killed in the Loughinisland massacre. People had gathered in The Heights Bar (some reporting calls the building O'Toole's Pub) in Loughinisland to watch the Republic of Ireland team playing in the 1994 FIFA World Cup, when masked gunmen of the Ulster Volunteer Force (UVF) entered and opened fire. Six people were killed and five wounded, but nobody was ever charged with their deaths.

Before becoming an MLA, Emma was a campaigner with the Loughinisland Justice Group, which works to uncover the truth of the attacks. Allegations persisted that the Royal Ulster Constabulary (RUC) knew that its own double agents or informers were linked to the massacre and that RUC protected the killers by destroying evidence and failing to carry out a proper investigation.

In June 2016, the Police Ombudsman reported that there had been collusion between some police officers and the loyalist gunmen. The murder squad which attacked the Heights Bar had also not been arrested for previous killings because the RUC Special Branch had withheld information from detectives investigating the crimes. Rogan said that the Ombudsman's report "vindicates our long-held suspicions and belief that the truth of these murders was being covered up."

In August 2016, Rogan welcomed a forthcoming documentary film about the massacre by American director Alex Gibney, describing it as permanent memory to the victims. The film is named "No Stone Unturned", after a comment by Emma's mother Claire Rogan that police had promised the families there would be "no stone unturned" in the investigation into the massacre. However, the film's planned world premiere at the April 2017 Tribeca Film Festival was postponed due to "ongoing legal issues relating to the subject matter of the film".

Northern Ireland Assembly
Preceded by Chris Hazzard	MLA for South Down; 2017–2022	Succeeded by Cathy Mason
