= Hugh Carr =

Politician from Northern Ireland

Member of Newry and Mourne District Council
- In office 17 May 1989 – April 2003
- Preceded by: Patrick Harper
- Succeeded by: Paul McKibben
- Constituency: Crotlieve

Member of the Northern Ireland Forum for South Down
- In office 30 May 1996 – 25 April 1998

Personal details
- Born: Northern Ireland
- Political party: Social Democratic and Labour Party

Hugh Carr is a former Irish Social Democratic and Labour Party (SDLP) politician.

== Biography ==
Carr was elected to Newry and Mourne District Council in 1989, representing the Social Democratic and Labour Party in Crotlieve.

Carr was elected to the Northern Ireland Forum in 1996, representing South Down, but was not able to take the same seat at the 1998 Northern Ireland Assembly election.

Carr held his council seat at the 1993, 1997 and 2001 elections. In 2003, he was appointed as the Chair of the Newry District Policing Partnership. However, he resigned from the council in April, citing personal circumstances.

Northern Ireland Forum
New forum	Member for South Down; 1996–1998	Forum dissolved
