= Chris Hazzard =

Northern Irish politician from Sinn Féin

Chris Hazzard MP
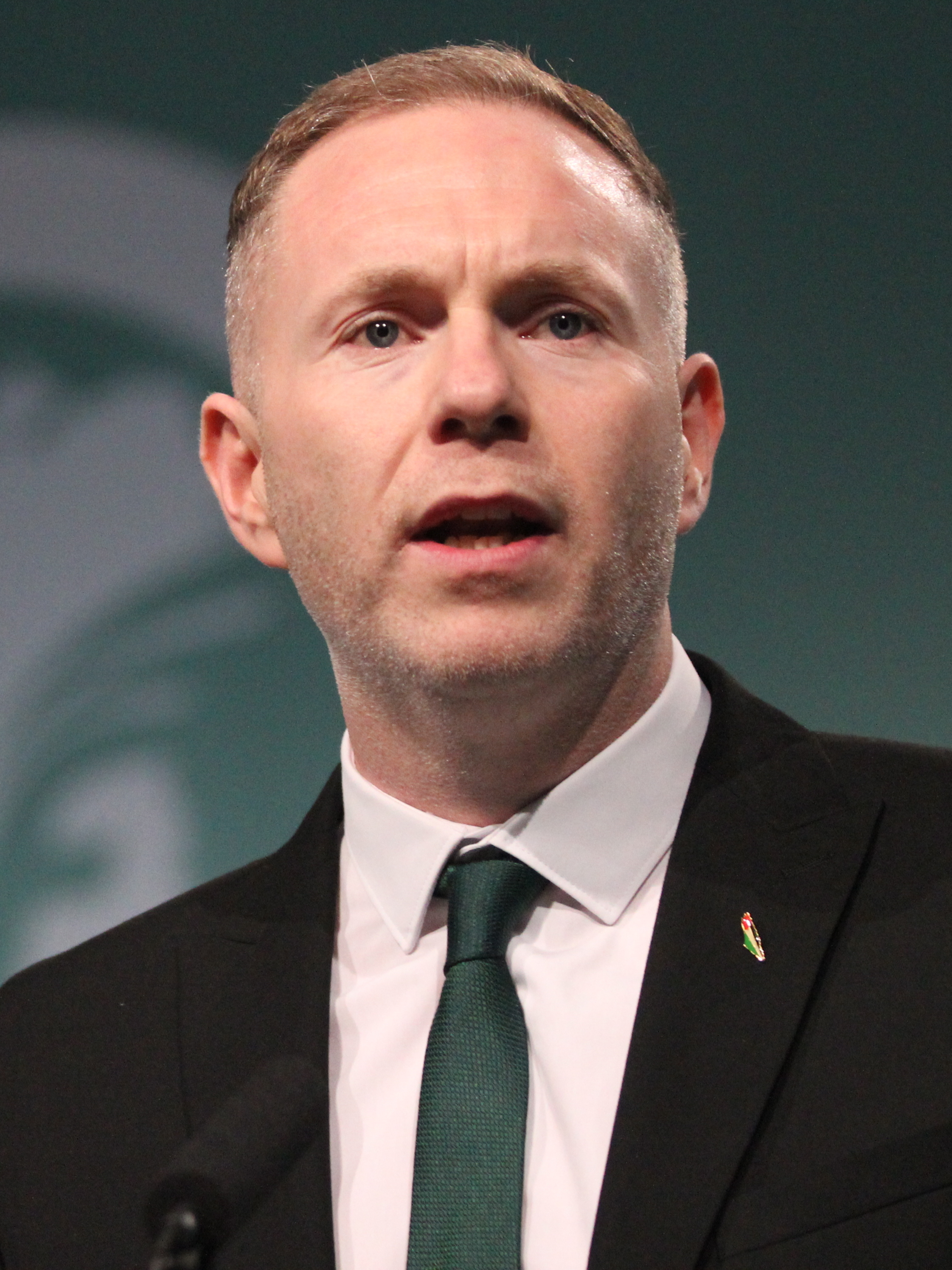
- Hazzard in 2023

Member of Parliament for South Down
- Incumbent
- Assumed office 8 June 2017
- Preceded by: Margaret Ritchie
- Majority: 9,280 (20.5%)

Member of the Legislative Assembly for South Down
- In office 13 April 2012 – 9 June 2017
- Preceded by: Willie Clarke
- Succeeded by: Emma Rogan

Minister for Infrastructure
- In office 25 May 2016 – 26 January 2017
- Preceded by: Michelle McIlveen
- Succeeded by: Nichola Mallon

Personal details
- Born: Christopher John Hazzard; 20 August 1984 (age 42) Drumaness, Northern Ireland
- Party: Sinn Féin
- Education: Queen's University Belfast

Christopher John Hazzard (born 20 August 1984) is an Irish Sinn Féin politician who has served as Member of Parliament (MP) for South Down since 2017. He previously served as Minister for Infrastructure from 2016 to 2017 and as a Member of the Legislative Assembly (MLA) for South Down from 2012 to 2017.

== Early life ==
Christopher John Hazzard was born in Drumaness, County Down, in 1984. The eldest of four siblings, he attended Our Lady and St Patrick's College, Knock, before going to Queen's University Belfast.

== Political career ==
Hazzard previously worked as a press officer for Sinn Féin.

He was selected by his party as a member (MLA) of the Northern Ireland Assembly to represent the South Down constituency in April 2012. He replaced his party colleague Willie Clarke, who had retired to concentrate on his local council work. Hazzard was the Minister for Infrastructure in Northern Ireland from May 2016 until the Executive's collapse in January 2017. He was also a member of the Education Committee from 2012 to 2016 and the Public Accounts Committee from 2013 to 2014.

At the snap general election held on 8 June 2017, he was elected as the MP for South Down, defeating the incumbent SDLP MP, Margaret Ritchie. It is the first time that his party have represented the seat.

== Personal life ==
Hazzard is a Gaelic Athletic Association member and PhD candidate at Queen's University Belfast. He was, at the time of his selection, the youngest MLA.

He is married to Lisa, and the couple have a daughter, Eva, who was born in August 2015.

Northern Ireland Assembly
Preceded by Willie Clarke	Member of the Legislative Assembly for South Down; 2012–2017	Succeeded by Emma Rogan
Political offices
Preceded by Michelle McIlveen as Minister for Regional Development	Minister for Infrastructure of Northern Ireland; 2016–2017	Vacant Government suspended Title next held by Nichola Mallon
Parliament of the United Kingdom
Preceded by Margaret Ritchie	Member of Parliament for South Down; 2017–present	Incumbent
