= Peter Brush =

Northern Irish politician (1901–1984)

Member of the Constitutional Convention for South Down
- In office 1975–1976

Personal details
- Born: 10 March 1901 Fermoy, Ireland
- Died: 22 July 1984 (aged 83)
- Party: Ulster Unionist Party

Lieutenant Colonel Edward James Augustus Howard Brush, CB DSO OBE (5 March 1901 – 22 July 1984), known as Peter Brush, was a Northern Irish unionist politician and paramilitary leader. In later life Brush was also known by the nickname "Basil", as a joke based on the television puppet Basil Brush.

== Background ==
Brush was born in Fermoy, County Cork, the son of Major George Howard Brush and May Florence Farrell. Educated at Clifton College and the Royal Military College, Sandhurst, Brush spent his early teenage years at his father's citrus plantation in Canada, later returning to Drumnabreeze House, Magheralin, County Down.

He had a distinguished career in the British Army and during the Second World War he was wounded in France in 1940 before being held as a prisoner of war for three years. He was awarded the Distinguished Service Order for his actions during the defence of Calais in 1940.

By the time he retired from the army he had reached the rank of Lieutenant-Colonel. Settling in County Down he took up farming but remained involved in military activity with the Territorial Army. He also served as deputy Lord Lieutenant of Down until resigning from the position in 1974. While a prisoner of war Bush wrote a textbook about horses which was later published. In civilian life he was a member of the Irish National Hunt Steeplechase Committee and a committee member of Down Royal Racecourse.

Brush first received public attention in 1973 when stories appeared in the press that he had been drilling his own right-wing loyalist private militia force. Claiming 5,000 members, the group, known as Down Orange Welfare, became involved in the Ulster Workers' Council strike of 1974, with Brush taking a leading role in planning the stoppage as a member of the Ulster Workers' Council's Co-ordinating Committee.

Brush claimed in 1976 that he and his deputy in Down Orange Welfare Herbert Heslip had tried unsuccessfully to join the Ulster Defence Regiment (UDR) and Royal Ulster Constabulary Reserve (RUC). Brush was also president of the South Down Ulster Unionist Party Association and represented the constituency in the Northern Ireland Constitutional Convention. His political associates describe him variously as "evasive," "shy," "gentlemanly," and as having "the mind of a Rhodesia planter."

In February 1977, Brush "shocked" his unionist colleagues with a speech suggesting that they should come to an agreement with the Fine Gael government led by Taoiseach Liam Cosgrave, arguing that unionist and Fine Gael votes combined would outnumber Fianna Fáil and "Irish Socialist republicans" in a United Ireland. Brush believed the British government was seeking to withdraw from Northern Ireland, and a 32-county state in NATO would be preferable to a power-sharing administration with the Social Democratic and Labour Party (SDLP) in Northern Ireland as it was then constituted. He left the public eye after a second less successful loyalist strike in 1977.

Interviewed in 1980, Brush said he "liked" Ulster Defence Association (UDA) chairman Andy Tyrie but disagreed with the idea of an independent Northern Ireland, believing it could be exploited by the Soviet Union to undermine Britain's western seaboard ("a plum for Brezhnev"). He also believed if the Republic of Ireland joined the Commonwealth then unionists would be obliged to come to an agreement with the Irish government.

In 1935, he married Susan Mary Torbett; they had one daughter, Maureen Rosemary Brush (born 1940). He died, aged 83, in Dublin.

Northern Ireland Constitutional Convention
New convention	Member for South Down; 1975–1976	Convention dissolved
