= Ronald Broadhurst =

British politician (1906–1976)

Deputy Speaker of the Northern Ireland Assembly
- In office 1973–1974
- Preceded by: Position created
- Succeeded by: Position abolished

Member of the Northern Ireland Assembly for South Down
- In office 28 June 1973 – 1974
- Preceded by: Assembly established
- Succeeded by: Assembly abolished

Personal details
- Born: 1906
- Died: 1976 (aged 69–70)
- Party: Ulster Unionist Party
- Other political affiliations: Unionist Party of Northern Ireland

Military service
- Years of service: 1926-1948
- Rank: Brigadier
- Unit: Arab Legion

Brigadier Ronald Joseph Callender Broadhurst (1906–1976) was a British colonial police officer and Northern Irish unionist politician.

== Colonial Service ==
Broadhurst entered the colonial service in 1926. He served as an officer in the Palestine Police Force between 1930 and 1939, including the Great Palestinian Arab Revolt. He was made deputy chief-of-staff of the Arab Legion in 1939, the British controlled gendarmerie of the Emirate of Transjordan and was promoted to the rank of Brigadier. He received the King's Police and Fire Services Medal with the 1946 New Year Honours. He served as one of the British officers of the Arab Legion in the 1948 Arab–Israeli War and retired from service in the Arab Legion in 1948.

== Translation and Collection ==
An Arabist, in 1952 he authored a translation of The Travels of Ibn Jubayr from Arabic.

His papers are held in the Public Records Office of Northern Ireland in Belfast and also in St Antony's College, Oxford.

== Northern Irish Politics ==
In the 1973 Northern Ireland Assembly election, he was the last of seven MPAs elected in the South Down constituency, as a pro-Sunningdale candidate. He became the Deputy Speaker of the Assembly.

Also in 1973, Broadhurst appeared on Ulster Television demanding that the New University of Ulster (now the University of Ulster at Coleraine) be closed down, a request he also made in the Assembly, to no effect. As a supporter of Brian Faulkner, he followed Faulkner into the newly formed Unionist Party of Northern Ireland in 1974 and stood for the party in South Down in the Northern Ireland Constitutional Convention election of 1975 but failed to get elected.

Northern Ireland Assembly (1973)
New assembly	Assembly Member for South Down; 1973–1974	Assembly abolished
