= Diane Forsythe =

Northern Irish politician

Diane Forsythe MLA
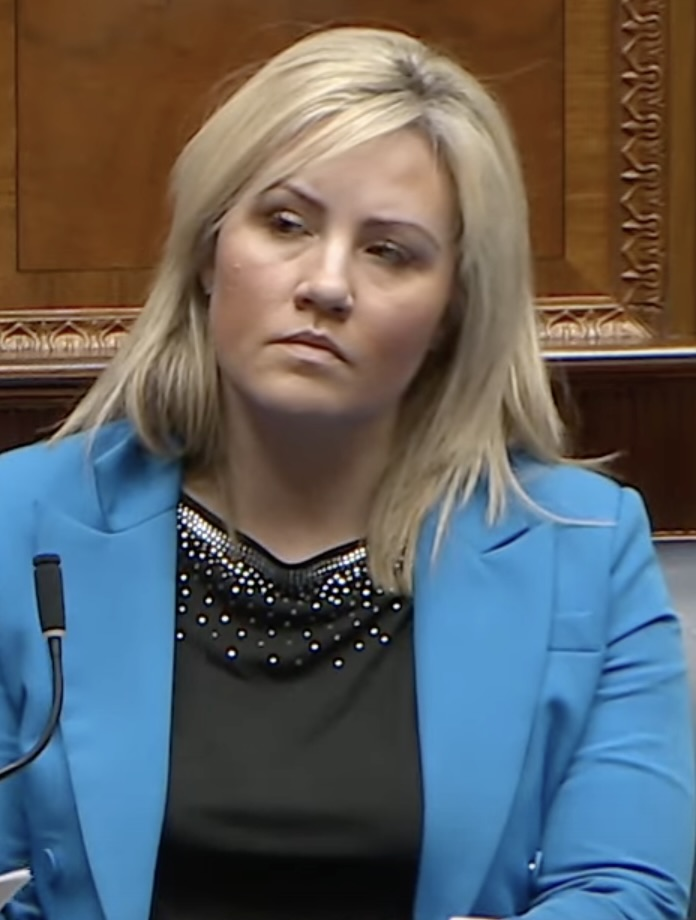
- Forsythe in 2024

Member of the Northern Ireland Assembly for South Down
- Incumbent
- Assumed office 7 May 2022
- Preceded by: Jim Wells

Personal details
- Party: Democratic Unionist Party
- Occupation: Politician

Diane Forsythe is a Democratic Unionist Party (DUP) politician, serving as a Member of the Northern Ireland Assembly (MLA) for South Down since 2022. Forsythe is the first female unionist MLA to represent the area. Forsythe is the DUP's Spokesperson for Communities, Childcare and Early Years.

== Political career ==
On 5 May 2022, Diane Forsythe was elected as the new Democratic Unionist Party MLA for the South Down Constituency. She polled 6,497 first preference votes, and was elected on the 6th count with 11,073 votes. She became the first female unionist MLA for the constituency.

In the 2022-27 Northern Ireland Assembly Mandate she served as Deputy Chair of the Assembly's Finance Committee, Public Accounts Committee, Audit Committee and Economy Committee.

She unsuccessfully stood for election in the South Down Westminster constituency at the 2017 UK general election. She came in third place polling 8,867 votes, equating to 17.4% of the total vote.

In April 2022, shortly before the 2022 Assembly election, all of the DUP's officers in South Down refused to endorse the party's candidate Forsythe and resigned from the DUP. They claimed that Forsythe was "imposed" on them by the DUP without proper consultation.

The Police Service of Northern Ireland launched an investigation into "a defamatory message" being shared about Forsythe during the election campaign.

She was the DUP's candidate in South Down at the 2024 general election, coming third with 7,349 votes (16.2%)
