= Michael McCartan =

Irish politician

Michael McCartan (1 January 1851 – 30 September 1902) was an Irish nationalist politician. He sat in the House of Commons of the United Kingdom from 1886 to 1902.

McCartan was born in Castlewellan, County Down, and educated at St. Malachy's College in Belfast and then Blackrock College. He became a solicitor in 1882.

At the 1886 general election he was elected as the Member of Parliament (MP) for South Down. He sat for the Irish Parliamentary Party until the split in 1890, when he joined the anti-Parnellite Irish National Federation, he rejoined the IPP when the two sides re-united in 1900.

Having been re-elected 3 times, McCartan resigned from the House of Commons on 1 February 1902. He died in September that year aged 51.

Parliament of the United Kingdom
Preceded by John Francis Small	Member of Parliament for South Down; 1886 – 1902	Succeeded by Jeremiah McVeagh
