= Commissioner for Standards at the Northern Ireland Assembly =

Officer of the Senedd

Northern Ireland Assembly Commissioner for Standards
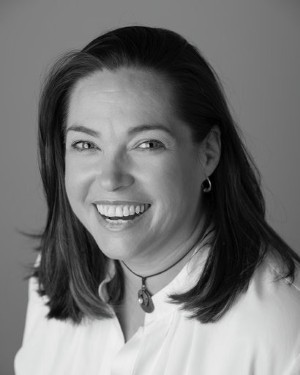
- Incumbent; Melissa McCullough since 7th September 2020
- Type: Commissioner
- Reports to: Northern Ireland Assembly
- Appointer: Committee on Standards and Privileges (Northern Ireland)
- First holder: Douglas Bain
- Website: standardscommissionerniassembly.org

The Commissioner for Standards at the Northern Ireland Assembly is an officer of the Northern Ireland Assembly. The work of the officer is overseen by the Committee on Standards and Privileges.

The first commissioner was Douglas Bain.

== Duties ==
The commissioner is in charge of regulating MLAs' conduct and propriety. One of the commissioner's main tasks is overseeing The Register of Members' Interests, which is intended to ensure disclosure of financial interests that may be of relevance to MSs' work.

The Commissioner for Standards at the Northern Ireland Assembly is appointed by a motion of the Northern Ireland Assembly and is an independent officer of the Assembly.

== History ==
The post was established in 1995 with Sir Douglas Bain as the first commissioner, then known as the Northern Ireland Commissioner for Complaints, jointly as the Assembly Ombudsman for Northern Ireland, serving the Committee on Standards and Privileges.

The current commissioner, Melissa McCullough, began her tenure on 7 September 2020.
