= South Down (Assembly constituency) =

Northern Ireland Assembly constituency

Coordinates: 54°14′39″N 5°57′03″W

- Northern Ireland Assembly; Parliamentary constituency
- South Down shown within Northern Ireland

Current constituency
- Created: 1973
- Seats: 6 (1996–2016); 5 (2017–)
- MLAs: Sinéad Ennis (SF); Diane Forsythe (DUP); Cathy Mason (SF); Colin McGrath (SDLP); Andrew McMurray (APNI)
- Districts: Newry, Mourne and Down District Council and small portion of ABC council

South Down is an electoral constituency for the Northern Ireland Assembly. It lies in the southern portion of County Down.

The seat was first used for a Northern Ireland-only election for the Northern Ireland Assembly in 1973. It usually shares the same boundaries as the South Down UK Parliament constituency, however the boundaries of the two constituencies were slightly different from 1983 to 1986 as the Assembly boundaries had not caught up with Parliamentary boundary changes and from 1996 to 1997 when members of the Northern Ireland Forum had been elected from the newly drawn Parliamentary constituencies but the 51st Parliament of the United Kingdom, elected in 1992 under the 1983–95 constituency boundaries, was still in session.

Members were then elected from the constituency to the 1975 Constitutional Convention, the 1982 Assembly, the 1996 Forum and then to the current Assembly from 1998.

Some of the most high-profile MLAs for the constituency have included Caitríona Ruane, Margaret Ritchie, and John McCallister.

For further details on the history and boundaries of the constituency, see South Down (UK Parliament constituency).

== Members ==
Election	MLA (party)	MLA (party)	MLA (party)	MLA (party)	MLA (party)	MLA (party)	MLA (party)
1973	Patrick O'Donoghue (SDLP)	Eddie McGrady (SDLP)	Frank Feely (SDLP)	Brian Faulkner (UUP/UPNI)	Herbert Heslip (UUP)	Ronald Broadhurst (UUP)	Cecil Harvey (Vanguard)
1975	Patrick O'Donoghue (SDLP)	Eddie McGrady (SDLP)	Frank Feely (SDLP)	Brian Faulkner (UUP/UPNI)	Herbert Heslip (UUP)	Peter Brush (UUP)	Cecil Harvey (Vanguard)
1982	Patrick O'Donoghue (SDLP)	Eddie McGrady (SDLP)	Frank Feely (SDLP)	Raymond McCullough (UUP)	William Brown (UUP)	Jim Wells (DUP)	George Graham (DUP)
1985 by-election	Patrick O'Donoghue (SDLP)	Eddie McGrady (SDLP)	Frank Feely (SDLP)	Jeffrey Donaldson (UUP)	William Brown (UUP)	Jim Wells (DUP)	George Graham (DUP)
1996	Mick Murphy (Sinn Féin)	Eddie McGrady (SDLP)	Margaret Ritchie (SDLP)	Hugh Carr (SDLP)	Dermot Nesbitt (UUP)	5 seats 1996–1998	
1998	Mick Murphy (Sinn Féin)	Eddie McGrady (SDLP)	Eamon O'Neill (SDLP)	P. J. Bradley (SDLP)	Dermot Nesbitt (UUP)	Jim Wells (DUP/Independent Unionist)	6 seats 1998–2017
2003	Caitríona Ruane (Sinn Féin)	Willie Clarke (Sinn Féin)	Margaret Ritchie (SDLP)	P. J. Bradley (SDLP)	Dermot Nesbitt (UUP)	Jim Wells (DUP/Independent Unionist)	6 seats 1998–2017
2007	Caitríona Ruane (Sinn Féin)	Willie Clarke (Sinn Féin)	Margaret Ritchie (SDLP)	P. J. Bradley (SDLP)	John McCallister (UUP/Independent)	Jim Wells (DUP/Independent Unionist)	6 seats 1998–2017
2011	Caitríona Ruane (Sinn Féin)	Willie Clarke (Sinn Féin)	Margaret Ritchie (SDLP)	Karen McKevitt (SDLP)	John McCallister (UUP/Independent)	Jim Wells (DUP/Independent Unionist)	6 seats 1998–2017
April 2012 co-option	Caitríona Ruane (Sinn Féin)	Chris Hazzard (Sinn Féin)	Seán Rogers (SDLP)	Karen McKevitt (SDLP)	John McCallister (UUP/Independent)	Jim Wells (DUP/Independent Unionist)	6 seats 1998–2017
2016	Caitríona Ruane (Sinn Féin)	Chris Hazzard (Sinn Féin)	Colin McGrath (SDLP)	Sinéad Bradley (SDLP)	Harold McKee (UUP)	Jim Wells (DUP/Independent Unionist)	6 seats 1998–2017
2017	Sinéad Ennis (Sinn Féin)	Chris Hazzard (Sinn Féin)	Colin McGrath (SDLP)	Sinéad Bradley (SDLP)	5 seats 2017–present	Jim Wells (DUP/Independent Unionist)	5 seats 2017–present
June 2017 co-option	Sinéad Ennis (Sinn Féin)	Emma Rogan (Sinn Féin)	Colin McGrath (SDLP)	Sinéad Bradley (SDLP)	5 seats 2017–present	Jim Wells (DUP/Independent Unionist)	5 seats 2017–present
May 2018 defection	Sinéad Ennis (Sinn Féin)	Emma Rogan (Sinn Féin)	Colin McGrath (SDLP)	Sinéad Bradley (SDLP)	5 seats 2017–present	Jim Wells (DUP/Independent Unionist)	5 seats 2017–present
2022	Sinéad Ennis (Sinn Féin)	Cathy Mason (Sinn Féin)	Colin McGrath (SDLP)	Patrick Brown (Alliance)	5 seats 2017–present	Diane Forsythe (DUP)	5 seats 2017–present
April 2024 co-option	Sinéad Ennis (Sinn Féin)	Cathy Mason (Sinn Féin)	Colin McGrath (SDLP)	Andrew McMurray (Alliance)	5 seats 2017–present	Diane Forsythe (DUP)	5 seats 2017–present

Note: The columns in this table are used only for presentational purposes, and no significance should be attached to the order of columns. For details of the order in which seats were won at each election, see the detailed results of that election.

== Elections ==
=== Northern Ireland Assembly ===
==== 2027 ====
2027 Assembly election: South Down – 5 seats
Party	Candidate	FPv%	Count
Party	Candidate	FPv%	1
Sinn Féin	Sinéad Ennis		
Sinn Féin	Cathy Mason		
Alliance	Andrew McMurray		
Sinn Féin	Michael Rice		

==== 2022 ====
2022 Assembly election: South Down – 5 seats
Party	Candidate	FPv%	Count					
Party	Candidate	FPv%	1	2	3	4	5	6
Sinn Féin	**Sinéad Ennis**	26.17%	**14,381**					
Sinn Féin	**Cathy Mason**	18.13%	**9,963**					
Alliance	**Patrick Brown**	12.63%	6,942	8,071	8,251	8,865	**9,301**	
DUP	**Diane Forsythe**	11.82%	6,497	6,512	6,513	6,617	8,034	**11,073**
SDLP	**Colin McGrath**	11.07%	6,082	7,748	8,164	8,798	8,933	**9,119**
SDLP	Karen McKevitt	5.47%	3,006	4,772	4,875	5,090	5,139	5,259
TUV	Harold McKee	5.96%	3,273	3,279	3,280	3,332	4,118	
UUP	Jill Macauley	5.24%	2,880	2,900	2,902	2,944		
Aontú	Rosemary McGlone	2.14%	1,177	1,439	1,488			
Green (NI)	Noeleen Lynch	0.75%	412	564	580			
People Before Profit	Paul McCrory	0.37%	205	270	283			
Independent	Patrick Clarke	0.24%	134	209	224			
Electorate: 84,046 Valid: 54,952 (65.38%) Spoilt: 679 Quota: 9,159 Turnout: 55,631 (66.19%)

==== 2017 ====
2017 Assembly election: South Down – 5 seats
Party	Candidate	FPv%	Count						
Party	Candidate	FPv%	1	2	3	4	5	6	7
Sinn Féin	**Sinéad Ennis**	20.76%	**10,256**						
Sinn Féin	**Chris Hazzard**	17.87%	**8,827**						
SDLP	**Sinéad Bradley**	14.82%	7,323	7,487	**8,906.12**				
DUP	**Jim Wells**	15.76%	7,786	8,088	8,091.36	8,091.64	**10,821.64**		
SDLP	**Colin McGrath**	10.34%	5,110	5,202	5,512.8	6,043.68	6,632.42	7,228.42	**7,613.62**
Alliance	Patrick Brown	9.18%	4,535	4,883	5,101.64	5,194.88	6,007.82	6,730.82	6,874.66
UUP	Harold McKee	8.45%	4,172	4,509	4,522.44	4,527.76			
TUV	Lyle Rea	1.28%	630						
Green (NI)	Hannah George	0.98%	483						
Independent	Patrick Clarke	0.39%	192						
NI Conservatives	Gary Hynds	0.17%	85						
Electorate: 75,415 Valid: 49,399 (65.50%) Spoilt: 535 Quota: 8,234 Turnout: 49,932 (66.21%)

==== 2016 ====
2016 Assembly election: South Down – 6 seats
Party	Candidate	FPv%	Count							
Party	Candidate	FPv%	1	2	3	4	5	6	7	8
DUP	**Jim Wells**	12.25%	5,033	5,183	**6,470**					
UUP	**Harold McKee**	8.47%	3,481	3,812	5,168	5,567	**6,141**			
Sinn Féin	**Chris Hazzard**	12.28%	5,045	5,142	5,144	5,321	5,321.5	**7,277.5**		
SDLP	**Sinéad Bradley**	12.32%	5,059	5,231	5,241	5,828	5,834	**6,144**		
Sinn Féin	**Caitríona Ruane**	10.20%	4,191	4,240	4,244	4,335	4,335	5,415	**6,664.5**	
SDLP	**Colin McGrath**	10.44%	4,288	4,429	4,440	5,033	5,038	5,121	5,190	**5,397**
SDLP	Seán Rogers	8.68%	3,564	3,699	3,721	4,076	4,086.5	4,227.5	4,309	4,595.75
Sinn Féin	Michael Gray-Sloan	8.57%	3,520	3,571	3,572	3,665	3,665			
Alliance	Patrick Brown	5.36%	2,200	2,841	2,869					
TUV	Henry Reilly	6.62%	2,718	2,800						
Independent	John McCallister	2.81%	1,156							
Green (NI)	John Hardy	2.00%	820							
Electorate: 77,409 Valid: 41,075 (53.06%) Spoilt: 570 Quota: 5,868 Turnout: 41,645 (53.80%)

==== 2011 ====
2011 Assembly election: South Down – 6 seats
Party	Candidate	FPv%	Count								
Party	Candidate	FPv%	1	2	3	4	5	6	7	8	9
SDLP	**Margaret Ritchie**	20.61%	**8,506**								
Sinn Féin	**Caitríona Ruane**	14.43%	5,955	**6,192.15**							
DUP	**Jim Wells**	12.60%	5,200	5,284.84	5,354.56	5,404.28	**6,543.28**				
UUP	**John McCallister**	10.68%	4,409	4,480.92	4,624.88	4,714.77	5,679.9	**6,329.6**			
Sinn Féin	**Willie Clarke**	9.40%	3,882	3,957.95	3,992.5	4,094.15	4,101.46	4,103.2	**6,777.2**		
SDLP	**Karen McKevitt**	9.10%	3,758	4,318.79	4,432.71	4,675.33	4,702.43	4,707.27	4,842.93	5,277.28	**5,347.46**
SDLP	Eamon O'Neill	6.38%	2,663	3,844.72	3,959.19	4,222.77	4,251.35	4,259.47	4,449.46	4,826.14	4,882.98
Sinn Féin	Naomi Bailie	7.39%	3,050	3,150.44	3,161.06	3,305.46	3,306.77	3,308.51			
UKIP	Henry Reilly	5.63%	2,332	2,353.29	2,373.7	2,398.94					
Green (NI)	Cadogan Enright	2.68%	1,107	1,227.28	1,238.75						
Alliance	David Griffin	2.09%	864	915.15							
Electorate: 73,240 Valid: 41,726 (56.97%) Spoilt: 825 Quota: 5,961 Turnout: 42,551 (58.10%)

==== 2007 ====
2007 Assembly election: South Down – 6 seats
Party	Candidate	FPv%	Count										
Party	Candidate	FPv%	1	2	3	4	5	6	7	8	9	10	11
Sinn Féin	**Caitríona Ruane**	13.74%	6,334	6,336	6,337	6,337	6,428	6,450	**6,676**				
Sinn Féin	**Willie Clarke**	11.14%	5,138	5,145	5,152	5,154	5,259	5,273	5,412	**7,382**			
SDLP	**Margaret Ritchie**	12.66%	5,838	5,870	5,887	5,892	6,026	6,055	6,429	**6,945**			
SDLP	**P. J. Bradley**	12.26%	5,652	5,662	5,682	5,684	5,772	5,829	6,190	6,286	**6,650.32**		
DUP	**Jim Wells**	12.02%	5,542	5,546	5,605	5,763	5,792	6,188	6,240	6,248	6,250.97	**8,462.97**	
UUP	**John McCallister**	9.64%	4,447	4,448	4,553	4,637	4,819	5,230	5,370	5,377	5,384.92	6,046.91	**7,720.91**
SDLP	Michael Carr	6.45%	2,972	2,976	2,986	2,989	3,062	3,093	3,354	3,422	3,830.87	3,853.87	3,882.87
DUP	William Burns	5.66%	2,611	2,613	2,667	2,721	2,741	3,040	3,061	3,062	3,064.97		
Sinn Féin	Eamonn McConvey	5.77%	2,662	2,678	2,679	2,679	2,703	2,703	2,778				
Green (NI)	Ciaran Mussen	3.52%	1,622	1,646	1,675	1,685	2,008	2,043					
UKIP	Henry Reilly	2.67%	1,229	1,229	1,239	1,326	1,354						
Alliance	David Griffin	1.50%	691	700	743	755							
Ind. Republican	Martin Cunningham	0.94%	434	441	448	448							
UK Unionist	Frederick Wharton	0.92%	424	424	443								
NI Conservatives	Peter Bowles	0.85%	391	391									
Labour Party NI	Malachi Curran	0.27%	123										
Electorate: 71,704 Valid: 46,110 (64.31%) Spoilt: 513 Quota: 6,588 Turnout: 46,623 (65.02%)

==== 2003 ====
2003 Assembly election: South Down – 6 seats
Party	Candidate	FPv%	Count								
Party	Candidate	FPv%	1	2	3	4	5	6	7	8	9
DUP	**Jim Wells**	14.97%	**6,789**								
SDLP	**P. J. Bradley**	11.77%	5,337	5,337.36	5,355.36	5,682.96	**7,136.96**				
UUP	**Dermot Nesbitt**	11.84%	5,368	5,411	5,420	5,759.04	5,797.2	5,802.72	5,822.72	**8,325.72**	
Sinn Féin	**Caitríona Ruane**	11.29%	5,118	5,118	5,124	5,211.08	5,415.08	5,450.04	6,024.42	6,026.54	**6,035.54**
Sinn Féin	**Willie Clarke**	9.00%	4,083	4,083.08	4,092.08	4,185.16	4,268.2	4,278.78	5,920.74	5,926.44	**5,934.44**
SDLP	**Margaret Ritchie**	9.40%	4,261	4,261.76	4,313.76	4,665.32	4,848.36	4,921.5	5,419.96	5,477.96	**5,733.96**
SDLP	Eamon O'Neill	8.69%	3,942	3,942.92	3,963.92	4,220.24	4,692.32	5,215.34	5,350.34	5,411.52	5,697.52
UUP	Jim Donaldson	6.36%	2,885	2,984.52	2,989.52	3,254.96	3,264.12	3,265.96	3,269.42		
Sinn Féin	Eamonn McConvey	6.19%	2,806	2,806.12	2,833.12	2,961.16	2,986.16	2,990.3			
SDLP	Marion Fitzpatrick	5.25%	2,382	2,382.44	2,409.44	2,555.64					
Green (NI)	Raymond Blaney	1.76%	799	799.76	851.76						
NI Women's Coalition	Trudy Miller	1.25%	565	565.6	589.6						
Alliance	Neil Powell	1.08%	489	489.48	495.48						
UK Unionist	Nelson Wharton	0.54%	245	360.64	362.72						
Independent	Malachi Curran	0.36%	162	162.08							
Workers' Party	Des O'Hagan	0.25%	115	115.08							
Electorate: 70,149 Valid: 45,346 (64.64%) Spoilt: 666 Quota: 6,479 Turnout: 46,012 (65.59%)

==== 1998 ====
1998 Assembly election: South Down – 6 seats
Party	Candidate	FPv%	Count										
Party	Candidate	FPv%	1	2	3	4	5	6	7	8	9	10	11
SDLP	**Eddie McGrady**	20.20%	**10,373**										
Sinn Féin	**Mick Murphy**	12.17%	6,251	6,418.33	6,514.51	6,517.51	6,574.08	**7,761.08**					
UUP	**Dermot Nesbitt**	10.67%	5,480	5,507.84	5,524.03	5,788.9	6,133.54	6,137.99	6,137.99	**7,770.99**			
SDLP	**P. J. Bradley**	10.85%	5,571	6,218.28	6,313.44	6,317.31	6,485.16	6,563.4	6,665.52	6,716.39	6,739.49	**7,390.23**	
DUP	**Jim Wells**	9.40%	4,826	4,830.06	4,840.35	5,261.35	5,270.35	5,272.35	5,273.27	5,631.85	5,792.85	5,849.34	**8,170.34**
SDLP	**Eamon O'Neill**	6.98%	3,582	4,752.73	4,889.94	4,892.52	5,006.57	5,144.92	5,289.36	5,323.39	5,342.29	6,120.06	**6,163.2**
SDLP	Hugh Carr	7.27%	3,731	4,132.36	4,230.24	4,232.24	4,379.71	4,438.47	4,501.03	4,517.9	4,528.4	5,114.14	5,186.72
UK Unionist	Frederick Wharton	5.02%	2,576	2,577.16	2,581.16	2,886.45	2,904.74	2,905.74	2,906.20	3,125.36	3,271.66	3,313.71	
NI Women's Coalition	Anne Carr	3.23%	1,658	1,811.41	2,000.03	2,009.32	2,563.74	2,675.11	2,785.05	2,890.12	2,955.57		
UUP	Norman Hanna	3.78%	1,939	1,946.83	1,962.28	2,481.15	2,642.73	2,646.73	2,647.65				
Sinn Féin	Garret O'Fachtna	2.96%	1,520	1,603.81	1,697.41	1,697.7	1,716.73						
Alliance	Anne-Marie Cunningham	2.92%	1,502	1,586.39	1,675.63	1,697.5							
Ind. Unionist	George Graham	3.04%	1,562	1,567.51	1,578.51								
Labour Party NI	Malachi Curran	0.97%	498	634.01									
Workers' Party	Des O'Hagan	0.25%	130	151.17									
Independent Labour	Patrick O'Connor	0.24%	121	148.84									
Natural Law	Thomas Mullins	0.06%	33	38.51									
Electorate: 71,000 Valid: 51,353 (72.33%) Spoilt: 989 Quota: 7,337 Turnout: 52,342 (73.72%)

=== 1996 forum ===
Successful candidates are shown in bold.

Party	Candidate(s)	Votes	Percentage
SDLP	**Eddie McGrady**; **Hugh Carr**; **Margaret Ritchie**; Marietta Farrell; John Doris	20,220	43.2
UUP	**Dermot Nesbitt**; Frederick Wharton; Gerry Douglas; Albert Colmer; William Martin	10,379	22.2
Sinn Féin	**Mick Murphy**; Frank McDowell; Martin Gough; Deidre Clark	6,142	13.1
DUP	William Alexander; John Finlay; William Burns	5,060	10.8
Alliance	Julian Crozier; Michael Healy	1,685	3.6
Labour coalition	Malachi Curran; Patrick O'Connor; Edna Furey; James Masson; Michael Kearney	927	2.0
PUP	George Graham; James McDonald	497	1.1
NI Women's Coalition	Bronagh Lawson; Claire Hannah; Lynn Carvill; Ursula Leahy	464	1.0
Ulster Democratic	Norma Coulter; Denis Paisley	404	0.9
Green (NI)	Maggie Burch; Eugene O'Shea; Christopher Busby	251	0.6
NI Conservatives	Paul Megarity; Michael Henderson	197	0.4
Workers' Party	Marie O'Hagan; Eddie O'Hagan	162	0.4
Ulster Independence	Samuel Pollock; Stanley Watson; James McElrath	130	0.3
Democratic Partnership	William Leneghan; Sean O'Baoill	117	0.2
Democratic Left	Veronica McEneaney; Jim Ryan	65	0.1
Natural Law	Desmond Garrett; William McCarthy	30	0.1
Independent Chambers	George Chambers; Doreen Larmour	18	0.0

=== 1985 by-election ===
17 October 1985 by-election: South Down – 1 seat
Party	Candidate	FPv%	Count
Party	Candidate	FPv%	1
UUP	**Jeffrey Donaldson**	86.1%	**17,528**
Ind. Unionist	Ethel Smyth	13.9%	2,838
Electorate: 98,126 Valid: 20,366 Spoilt: 486 Quota: 10,184 Turnout: 20,366 (21.3%)

=== 1982 ===
1982 Assembly election: South Down – 7 seats
Party	Candidate	FPv%	Count										
Party	Candidate	FPv%	1	2	3	4	5	6	7	8	9	10	11
SDLP	**Frank Feely**	12.52%	**7,391**										
SDLP	**Eddie McGrady**	12.38%	7,313	**7,636**									
UUP	**William Brown**	8.84%	5,220	5,227	5,234	5,441	5,441	**7,593**					
SDLP	**Patrick O'Donoghue**	10.02%	5,916	6,252	6,440	6,449	6,449	6,455	**8,181**				
UUP	**Raymond McCullough**	9.82%	5,802	5,808	5,809	5,903	5,903	6,451	6,458	6,471	6,497.28	**9,553.28**	
DUP	**George Graham**	6.90%	4,075	4,081	4,082	5,366	5,336	5,533	5,543	5,548	5,552.14	6,518.35	**7,596.35**
DUP	**Jim Wells**	6.40%	3,779	3,783	3,783	5,361	5,361	5,474	5,488	5,503	5,505.16	5,662.54	**5,936.54**
Alliance	Patrick Forde	6.17%	3,646	3,999	4,027	4,047	4,047	4,148	4,346	4,707	4,708.53	4,878.11	5,101.11
UUP	William Coulter	6.41%	3,787	3,794	3,795	3,828	3,828	4,490	4,497	4,508	4,664.96		
Sinn Féin	Cyril Toman	5.75%	3,393	3,772	3,795	3,805	3,805	3,806					
UUP	William Martin	6.03%	3,562	3,567	3,568	3,798	3,798						
DUP	Ethel Smyth	5.92%	3,495	3,507	3,508								
Workers' Party	Thomas Moore	2.84%	1,676										
Electorate: 93,261 Valid: 59,055 (63.32%) Spoilt: 2,137 Quota: 7,382 Turnout: 61,192 (65.61%)

=== 1975 Constitutional Convention ===
1975 Constitutional Convention: South Down – 7 seats
Party	Candidate	FPv%	Count								
Party	Candidate	FPv%	1	2	3	4	5	6	7	8	9
SDLP	**Frank Feely**	16.02%	**9,730**								
Vanguard	**Cecil Harvey**	14.56%	**8,843**								
SDLP	**Eddie McGrady**	11.95%	7,257	**8,560.28**							
SDLP	**Patrick O'Donoghue**	10.96%	6,657	7,335.26	7,336.52	**8,231.08**					
Unionist Party NI	**Brian Faulkner**	9.94%	6,035	6,048.2	6,075.78	6,078.5	6,114.34	6,127.14	6,608.72	6,687.12	**8,512.12**
UUP	**Peter Brush**	10.36%	6,293	6,294.32	6,520.56	6,520.46	6,520.46	6,520.56	6,813.24	6,891.16	**6,995**
UUP	**Herbert Heslip**	10.50%	6,380	6,384.84	6,643.7	6,643.86	6,644.5	6,645.72	6,726.26	6,736.72	**6,838.18**
DUP	David Herron	6.18%	3,752	3,757.28	4,464	4,464.16	4,464.16	4,465.16	4,536.28	4,552.50	4,624.66
Alliance	Anthony Williamson	2.65%	1,612	1,659.96	1,660.24	1,676.08	1,882.8	1,931.02	1,937.46	2,136.46	
Alliance	Denys Rowan-Hamilton	2.48%	1,509	1,518.02	1,520.82	1,529.46	1,678.42	1,714.02	1,757.02	1,950.58	
Republican Clubs	Raymond Blaney	1.65%	1,002	1,018.5	1,018.64	1,022.16	1,056.72	1,672.28	1,673.5		
Unionist Party NI	Ronald Broadhurst	1.64%	994	995.1	1,001.96	1,002.44	1,007.08	1,007.08			
Republican Clubs	Gerard O'Hanlon	1.12%	680	706.18	706.18	721.38	843.3				
Electorate: 89,912 Valid: 60,744 (67.56%) Spoilt: 2,129 Quota: 7,594 Turnout: 62,873 (69.93%)

=== 1973 ===
1973 Assembly election: South Down – 7 seats
Party	Candidate	FPv%	Count																
Party	Candidate	FPv%	1	2	3	4	5	6	7	8	9	10	11	12	13	14	15	16	17
UUP	**Brian Faulkner**	25.43%	**16,287**																
SDLP	**Eddie McGrady**	12.29%	7,870	7,894.99	7,913.50	7,926.5	7,927.5	7,972.01	**8,050.01**										
UUP	**Ronald Broadhurst**	2.37%	1,515	6,049.41	6,075.02	6,075.02	6,266.74	6,268.25	6,270.27	6,273.78	6,344.42	6,370.62	6,374.13	**9,108.64**					
SDLP	**Frank Feely**	10.71%	6,857	6,869.24	6,895.75	6,929.75	6,931.75	6,949.75	7,055.75	7,344.75	7,352.75	7,422.77	7,759.77	7,761.28	7,762.3	**9,190.3**			
SDLP	**Patrick O'Donoghue**	6.75%	4,322	4,327.1	4,343.1	4,346.1	4,347.1	4,406.1	4,507.61	4,608.61	4,630.14	4,745.65	5,709.65	5,711.65	5,712.67	7,180.69	**8,225.69**		
Vanguard	**Cecil Harvey**	7.82%	5,006	5,435.42	5,442.42	5,445.42	5,672.17	5,672.17	5,678.68	5,682.68	5,689.23	5,689.23	5,691.23	5,931.58	6,095.29	6,099.29	6,102.29	6,105.59	**9,485.59**
UUP	**Herbert Heslip**	5.99%	3,838	4,709.08	4,715.61	4,715.61	4,758.81	4,760.81	4,765.81	4,768.83	4,776.87	4,779.89	4,780.89	5,360.47	5,960.23	5,967.27	5,969.27	5,971.25	**7,177.36**
Alliance	Anthony Williamson	2.33%	1,489	1,519.09	1,543.09	1,546.09	1,548.09	1,550.09	1,590.09	1,598.09	2,283.3	4,155.98	4,261.49	4,296.77	4,398.26	4,664.77	4,711.77	4,923.63	4,954.5
DUP	David Herron	6.27%	4,016	4,327.61	4,332.12	4,332.12	4,453.81	4,453.81	4,461.81	4,464.81	4,471.32	4,471.83	4,473.83	4,666.69	4,811.02	4,816.02	4,818.02	4,819.34	
Ind. Nationalist	Rory McShane	4.35%	2,785	2,790.1	2,799.61	2,827.61	2,827.61	2,881.61	2,979.61	3,312.12	3,325.63	3,340.14	4,059.14	4,061.14	4,061.14				
UUP	William Martin	3.12%	1,996	3,760.6	3,766.11	3,766.11	3,810.74	3,812.74	3,817.27	3,820.82	3,851.08	3,865.12	3,865.12						
Ind. Nationalist	James O'Reilly	3.12%	2,000	2,001.02	2,008.02	2,016.02	2,018.02	2,092.02	2,268.53	2,397.53	2,405.04	2,447.04							
Alliance	Michael O'Shea	2.30%	1,475	1,503.05	1,557.09	1,558.09	1,561.09	1,565.09	1,588.6	1,605.6	2,209.04								
Alliance	Denys Rowan-Hamilton	2.06%	1,316	1,428.2	1,464.26	1,465.26	1,467.77	1,468.77	1,480.28	1,483.28									
Republican Clubs	Noel Collins	1.01%	648	652.08	652.08	959.08	965.08	1,378.08	1,402.1										
Ind. Nationalist	Arthur Doran	1.02%	653	658.1	678.61	686.63	696.14	705.14											
Republican Clubs	Edward O'Hagan	0.96%	612	613.02	614.02	695.02	695.53												
National Front	William Annett	0.92%	591	668.52	672.52	672.52													
Republican Clubs	Samuel Dowling	0.78%	499	499	502.02														
Ulster Liberal	Berkley Farr	0.41%	263	279.32															
Electorate: 89,234 Valid: 64,038 (71.76%) Spoilt: 1,359 Quota: 8,005 Turnout: 65,397 (73.29%)
