= Lawrence Orr =

British politician

Captain Lawrence Percy Story Orr (16 September 1918 – 11 July 1990) was an Ulster Unionist politician in Northern Ireland. He was Member of Parliament (MP) for South Down from 1950 until he retired at the October 1974 general election, preceding Enoch Powell.

== Bio ==
Orr was born at 2 Ulster Terrace in Belfast on 16 September 1918, the son of clerk William Robert Macauley Orr and Evelyn Sarah Storey.

He was later chairman of the Ulster Unionist MPs in the House of Commons from 1964 to 1974 and also Imperial Grand Master of the Orange Order.

He defended the influence of Orangemen in the UUP, saying they are "neither bigoted nor uncharitable ... we do not seek to injure or upbraid a man on account of his religious opinions ... and that they treated those who differed from them with all the common courtesies of a civilised community." Orr warned members not to "follow any narrow-minded part or copy the medieval Roman church in restricting the liberty of conscience of our members."

He also resisted attempts by Westminster to interfere in Northern Ireland's affairs. He married Jean Hughes and she bore five children, William, Mary, John, Robin and Christopher. Willie Orr has written a biography of his father combined with an autobiography. He had two other sons, James and Daniel.

Parliament of the United Kingdom
New constituency	Member of Parliament for South Down; 1950–Oct 1974	Succeeded by Enoch Powell
