= Mick Murphy (Sinn Féin politician) =

Irish nationalist politician (born 1942)

Member of Newry and Mourne District Council
- In office 21 May 1997 – 22 May 2014
- Preceded by: Gordon Heslip
- Succeeded by: Council abolished
- Constituency: Crotlieve

Member of the Northern Ireland Assembly for South Down
- In office 25 June 1998 – 26 November 2003
- Preceded by: Assembly re-established
- Succeeded by: Caitríona Ruane

Member of the Northern Ireland Forum for South Down
- In office 30 May 1996 – 25 April 1998

Personal details
- Born: 6 February 1942 (age 84) Banbridge, County Down, Northern Ireland
- Party: Sinn Féin

Michael Murphy (born 6 February 1942) is an Irish nationalist politician in Northern Ireland.

== Background ==
Active in Irish republicanism after getting involved with the Northern Ireland Civil Rights Association of the 1960s, he worked as a publican. In 1996, he was elected as a member of the Northern Ireland Forum for Sinn Féin in South Down. Murphy was the unsuccessful Sinn Féin candidate for South Down in the 1997 election to the United Kingdom Parliament; a few months later he was elected to Newry and Mourne District Council.

He was then elected from the same constituency to the Northern Ireland Assembly in 1998. He was Sinn Féin spokesperson on Housing. He was again elected as a councillor for Newry and Mourne District Council from the Crotlieve electoral area in 2005.

Northern Ireland Forum
New forum	Member for South Down; 1996–1998	Forum dissolved
Northern Ireland Assembly
New assembly	MLA for South Down; 1998–2003	Succeeded by Caitríona Ruane
Civic offices
Preceded by John Feehan	Mayor of Newry; 2010–2011	Succeeded by Charlie Casey
