= Caitríona Ruane =

Irish politician (born 1962)

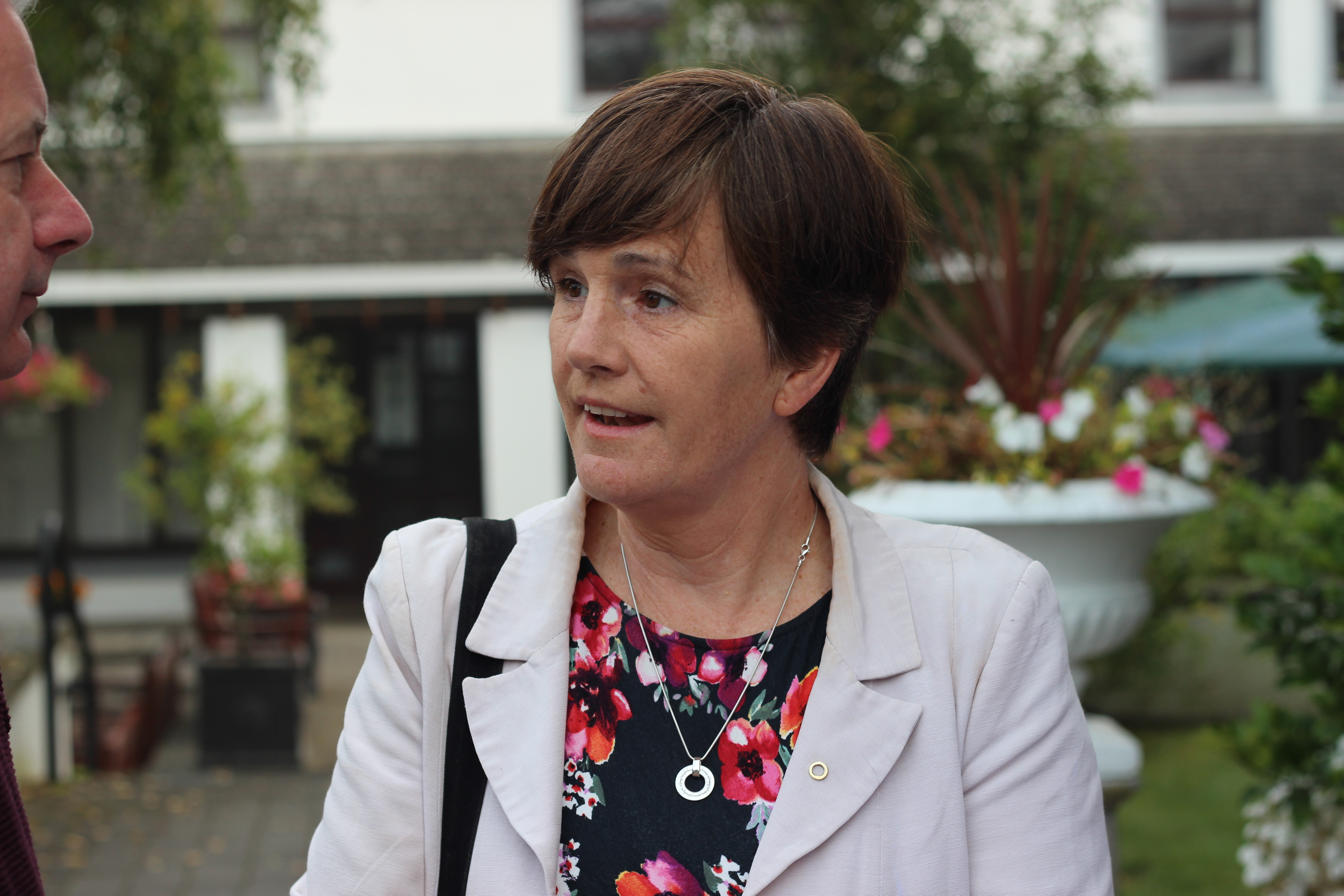
- Ruane in 2014

Principal Deputy Speaker of the Northern Ireland Assembly
- In office 12 May 2016 – 19 October 2017
- Preceded by: Robin Newton
- Succeeded by: Christopher Stalford

Minister of Education
- In office 8 May 2007 – 5 May 2011
- Preceded by: Martin McGuinness
- Succeeded by: John O'Dowd

Member of the Northern Ireland Assembly for South Down
- In office 26 November 2003 – 26 January 2017
- Preceded by: Mick Murphy
- Succeeded by: Sinéad Ennis

Personal details
- Born: 19 July 1962 (age 63) Swinford, County Mayo, Republic of Ireland
- Party: Sinn Féin
- Website: SF election page

Caitríona Ruane (born 1962) is a Sinn Féin politician who served as the Principal Deputy Speaker of the Northern Ireland Assembly from 2016 to 2017, and was a Member of the Northern Ireland Assembly (MLA) for South Down from 2003 to 2017.

In the first Northern Ireland Executive under First Minister Ian Paisley and deputy First Minister Martin McGuinness she was appointed Minister of Education. She faced opposition over the scrapping of the Transfer Examination (11-plus) and her subsequent plans for a replacement. She was replaced by John O'Dowd after the 2011 election.

== Background ==
Ruane is a former professional tennis player who represented Ireland in the Fed Cup. She now lives in Carlingford, County Louth and is married with two children. In the past Ruane has acted as director of the Féile an Phobail and chairperson of the St Patrick's Carnival Committee in Belfast.

== "Bring Them Home" campaign ==
Ruane was a prominent member of the Bring Them Home campaign for the Colombia Three, which sought the safe return of three Irishmen later convicted in their absence in Colombia of training FARC insurgents.

== Abolition of the 11-plus ==
Ruane has faced opposition for her support for abolition of the 11-plus examination, originally planned by her predecessor Martin McGuinness. She has faced opposition from the Democratic Unionist Party and Social Democratic and Labour Party as well as from 30 grammar schools in Northern Ireland, causing them to form the AQE (Association for Quality Education), which offered a replacement for the transfer examination. She was alleged to have delayed the publication of a report which showed that public opinion favoured academic selection.

In March 2011, Ruane caused controversy by claiming that all pupils should be given the opportunity to study the Irish language, that education in Northern Ireland should be made more similar to that in the Republic of Ireland, and that "the debate on academic selection is now over". Director of the Governing Bodies Association, which represents Northern Irish grammar schools, John Hart, said, "I think the minister is fooling only herself in trying to convince us that the debate surrounding academic selection is over. Some 26,000 parents last year did not think it was over. As we have said in the past, the minister washed her hands of responsibility for academic selection, so she would be better letting those with a more responsible approach get on with it, instead of petty badgering."

== See also ==
- Caitriona

Northern Ireland Assembly
Preceded by Mick Murphy	MLA for Down South; 2003–2017	Succeeded by Sinéad Ennis
Political offices
Vacant Office suspended Title last held by Martin McGuinness	Minister of Education; 2007–2011	Succeeded by John O'Dowd
