= Des O'Hagan =

- O'Hagan in the 1980s
- Born: Desmond Patrick O’Hagan; 29 March 1934; Lower Falls, Belfast, Northern Ireland
- Died: 5 May 2015 (aged 81); Downpatrick, Northern Ireland
- Education: London School of Economics
- Political party: Workers' Party
- Movement: Northern Ireland Civil Rights Association
- Military career
- Paramilitaries: Fianna Éireann (1947–1949); Irish Republican Army (1949–c. 1950s; Saor Uladh (c. 1950s–1960)
- Service years: 1947–1960

Des O'Hagan (29 March 1934 – 5 May 2015) was a prominent member of the Workers' Party and was a founding member of the Northern Ireland Civil Rights Association.

O'Hagan was born in the Lower Falls area of Belfast in 1934 and became active in republican revolutionary politics in the city from an early age. His grandfather, Michael McKeown, had been head of the Docker's Union in Belfast, and had participated in the 1907 Belfast Dock strike alongside Jim Larkin. His mother was a devout Catholic but a firm supporter of the Second Spanish Republic and a rabid anti-Francoist. Her family lived besides James Connolly while he resided in Belfast and her father had been his associate. He attended St Malachy's College in North Belfast.

In 1947 At age 13 he joined Na Fianna Eireann, the youth wing of the Irish Republican Army (IRA), and by 15 he lied about his age in order to enter into the IRA proper. However, he was later expelled from the IRA after joining the Northern Irish civil service, a job which required swearing an oath of loyalty to the British monarchy. He subsequently joined Saor Uladh, an left-wing IRA splinter organisation. He was imprisoned in Crumlin Road jail in his native Belfast from 1956 to 1960 for attempting to rescue a Republican from police custody while being treated at Mater Infirmorum Hospital.

On his release from imprisonment, O'Hagan was enrolled in the London School of Economics, where he was influenced by Marxist theorist Ralph Miliband, graduating in 1964. He subsequently returned to Belfast and was appointed to the post of Senior Lecturer in Sociology in Stranmillis College of Teacher Education, now known as Stranmillis University College. Between his time in London and the growing influence of left-wing members of the IRA/Sinn Féin such as Cathal Goulding, Tomás Mac Giolla and Seán Garland, O'Hagan became a committed Communist.

In 1967 O'Hagan was one of the founding members of the Northern Ireland Civil Rights Association (NICRA) and played an important role in organising many of the campaign's major demonstrations and in the development of NICRA into a serious political machine which forced the British government of the time to make major political concessions.

Des O'Hagan was one of a large number of Republicans who were arrested and interned without trial in August 1971. He quickly began documenting the ill-treatment of prisoners by the British authorities and had these articles smuggled out of the Long Kesh internment camp. They were soon serialised by the Irish Times newspaper as Letters from Long Kesh. His articles played a significant role in exposing the torture and ill-treatment of prisoners at the camp and drawing international attention to them. The "Letters from Long Kesh" were finally published in book form, by Citizen Press, in September 2012 to mark the 40th anniversary of their serialisation.

On his release from internment, O'Hagan resigned from his post in the overwhelmingly Protestant Stranmillis and once again became involved in the official republican movement and played an important role of its development into the Workers' Party. He was for a time editor of The Irish People and served on the party's Central Executive Committee for many years during which he was chairman of the party's education committee. He also contested a number of elections on behalf of the Workers' Party in the South Down constituency.

By the 1970s he had adopted the nickname "The Red Divil" (a Northern Irish pronunciation of "The Red Devil") after he was denounced at the pulpit by Canon Murray of St Peter's Cathedral for his Communist outlook and his known opposition to the Catholic Church.

Following the dissolution of the Soviet Union, left-wing parties and movements across the West rapidly shifted away from hardliner positions. Splits were common and the Worker's Party was not unaffected, seeing a major split occur when a major faction of the party left to form Democratic Left, a Democratic socialist party as opposed to the Marxist-Leninist stance of the Worker's Party. O'Hagan remained a hardliner and viewed the split as a "Betrayal", and desperately tried to hold the fragments of the Worker's Party together as it dwindled. He lashed out the emergence of New Labour in the United Kingdom, which saw the Labour Party move away from Socialist policies towards a version of Social Democracy.

Des O'Hagan died on 5 May 2015, aged 81 in Downpatrick.
