= Cathy Mason =

Politician from Northern Ireland

Cathy Mason MLA
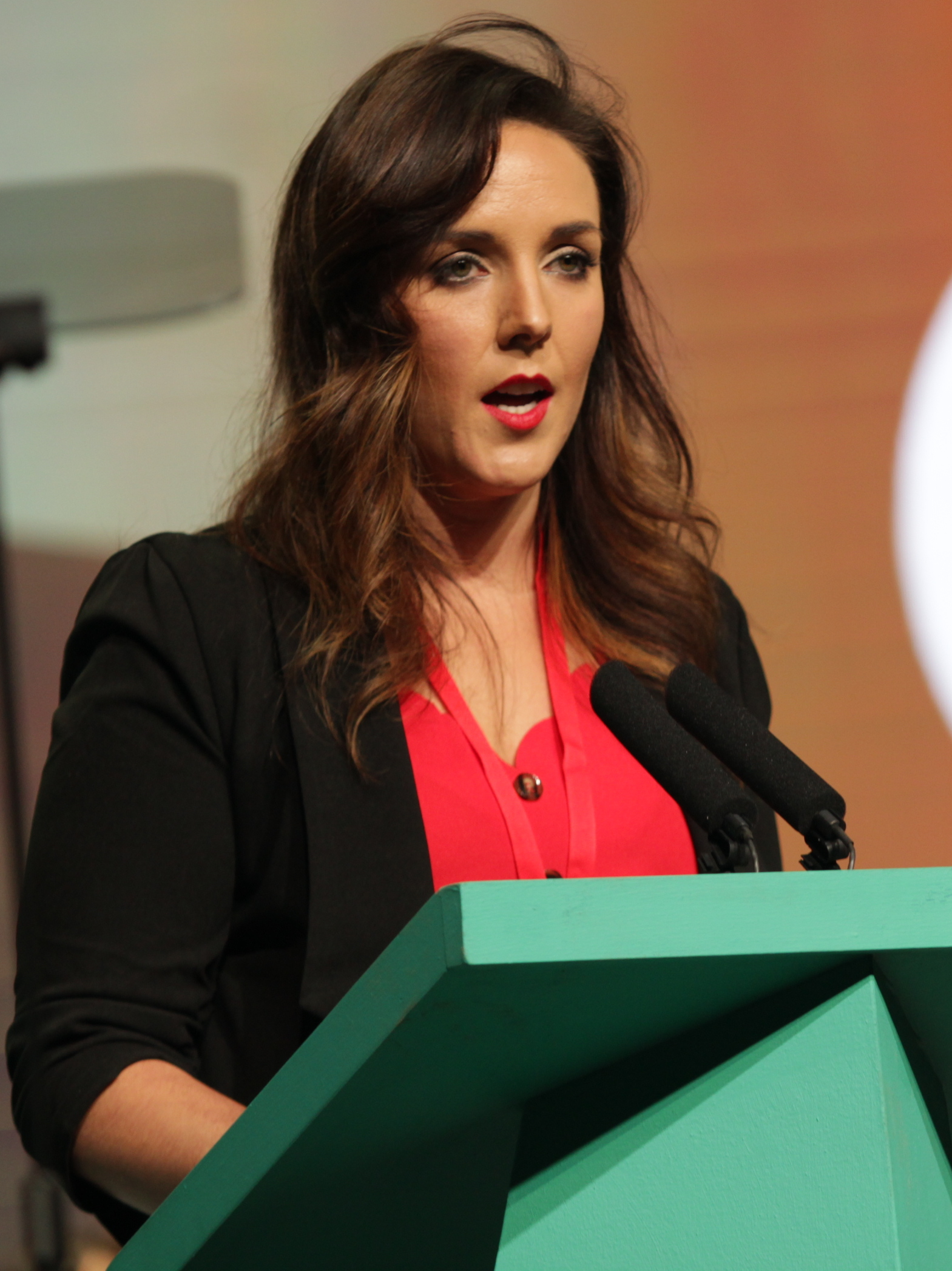
- Mason in 2022

Member of the Northern Ireland Assembly for South Down
- Incumbent
- Assumed office 5 May 2022
- Preceded by: Emma Rogan

Member of Newry, Mourne and Down District Council
- In office 2 May 2019 – 5 May 2022
- Preceded by: John Rice
- Succeeded by: Jim Brennan
- Constituency: Slieve Croob

Personal details
- Born: Drumaness, Northern Ireland
- Party: Sinn Féin

Cathy Mason is a Sinn Féin politician who was elected to the Northern Ireland Assembly from South Down in the 2022 election.

== Political career ==
In the 2019 Northern Ireland local elections, Mason was elected to the Newry, Mourne and Down District Council as a Councillor of the district electoral area (DEA) of Slieve Croob, winning 1,069 first preference votes and being elected on the fifth count. Mason became Chairperson of the Council on 1st June 2021.

Mason was elected to the Northern Ireland Assembly from South Down in the 2022 election, receiving 9,963 first preference votes and being elected on the first count.
