= Jeremiah McVeagh =

Irish journalist and politician (1870–1932)

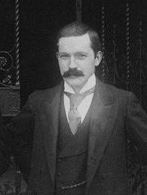
- McVeagh in 1898

Member of Parliament for South Down
- In office 1902–1922
- Preceded by: John Francis Small
- Succeeded by: Constituency abolished

Personal details
- Born: 1870 Belfast, Ireland
- Died: 17 April 1932 (aged 61–62) Dublin, Ireland
- Party: Irish Parliamentary Party
- Other political affiliations: Nationalist Party; Labour Party (UK); National League Party
- Education: Royal University of Ireland

Jeremiah McVeagh (1870 – 17 April 1932) was an Irish nationalist politician and Member of Parliament (MP) in the House of Commons of the United Kingdom.

He was born in Belfast in 1870, the son of Thomas McVeagh, a shipbuilder. He was educated at St Malachy's College, Belfast, and at the Royal University of Ireland.

A journalist and barrister by profession, in the 1890s, McVeagh was based in London, where he was active in the Irish National League of Great Britain.

He was first elected as the Irish Parliamentary Party MP for the South Down constituency at the 1902 by-election, and was again re-elected at the 1906, January 1910, December 1910 and 1918 general elections, and served until 1922 as member of the Nationalist Party.

McVeagh was an unsuccessful candidate for the British Labour Party in Sunderland at the 1924 United Kingdom general election. He was also unsuccessful in the 1925 Seanad election and the June 1927 Irish general election, when he ran for the National League Party in Monaghan.

In 1913 he presented the Jeremiah MacVeagh Cup to the Down County GAA Board. The cup has been presented to the winners of the annual Down Senior Hurling Championship ever since.

He never married. He died in a Dublin nursing home in 1932, following a series of heart attacks, and was buried in Glasnevin Cemetery.

Parliament of the United Kingdom
Preceded by John Francis Small	Member of Parliament for South Down; 1902–1922	Constituency abolished
