= Sinéad Ennis =

Northern Ireland politician

Sinéad Ennis MLA
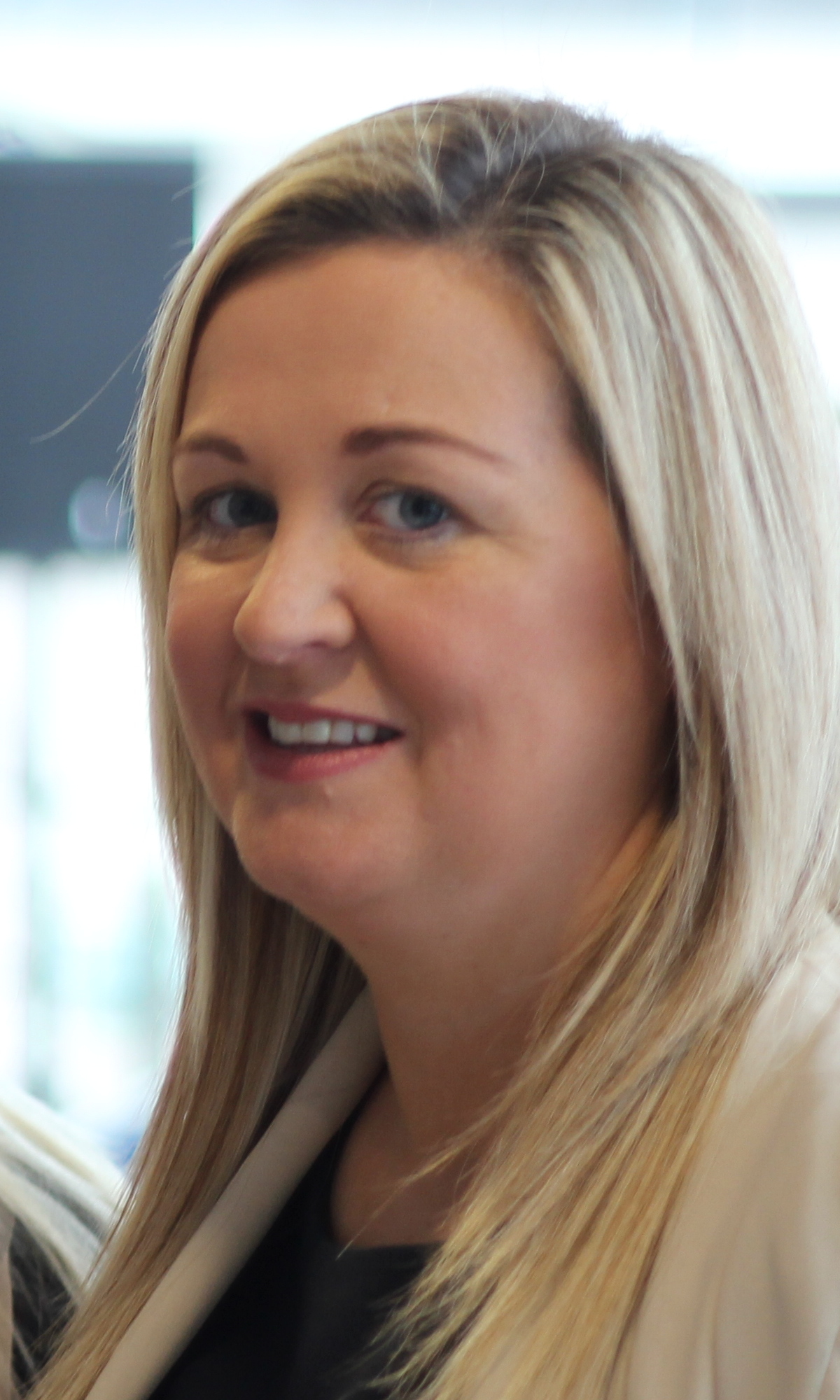
- Ennis in 2017

Member of the Northern Ireland Assembly for South Down
- Incumbent
- Assumed office 3 March 2017
- Preceded by: Caitríona Ruane

Personal details
- Born: Derryleckagh
- Party: Sinn Féin
- Website: Sinéad Ennis MLA

Sinéad Ennis is an Irish Sinn Féin politician who has served as a Member of the Northern Ireland Assembly (MLA) for South Down since 2017.

She is married and has two daughters. She has played Gaelic games at club level with Burren GAA. She was previously a member of Newry, Mourne and Down District Council from 2013 to 2017.

Northern Ireland Assembly
Preceded by Caitríona Ruane	MLA for Down South; 2017–present	Incumbent
