= Pat McNamee =

Irish nationalist politician (born 1957)

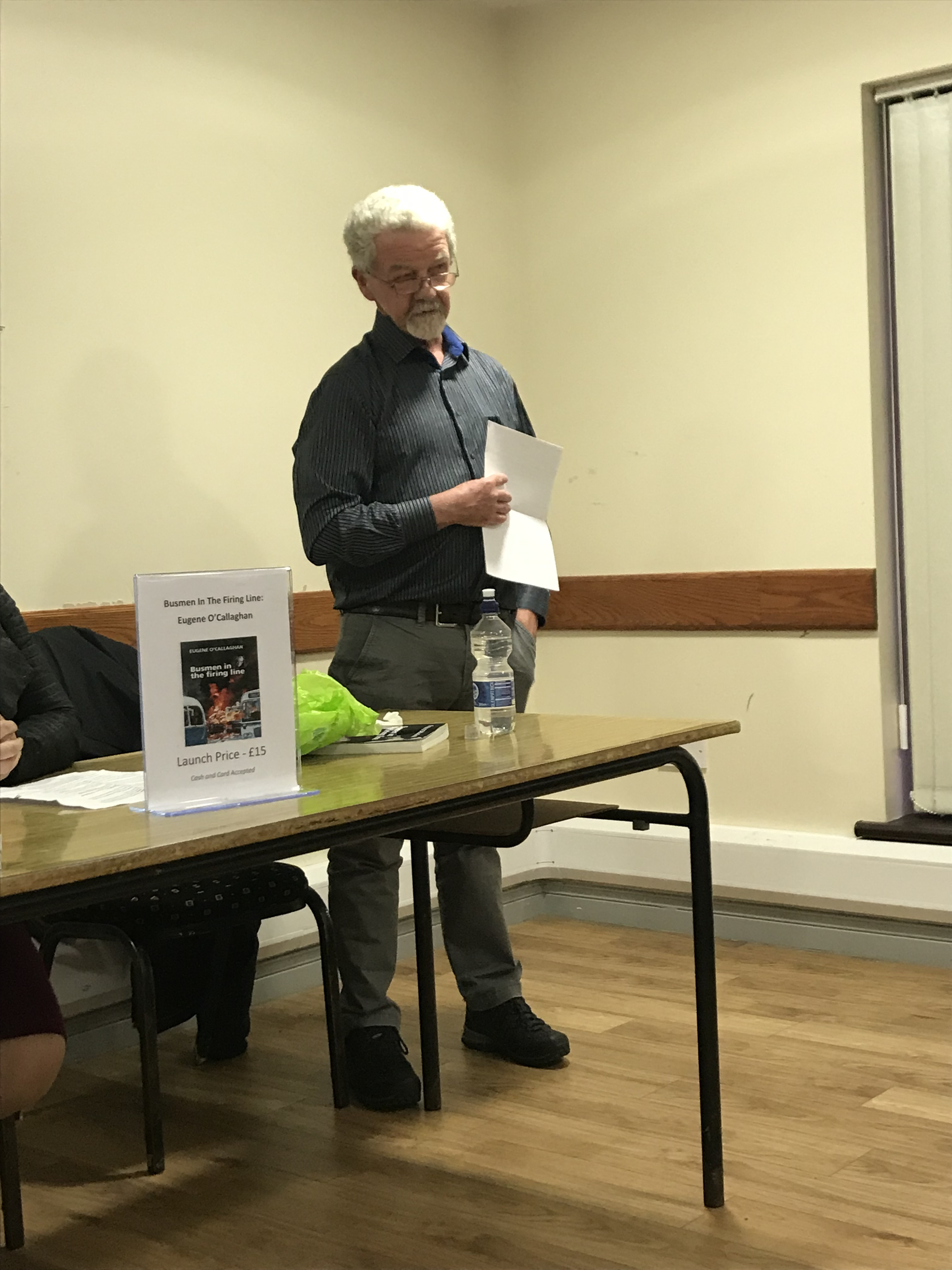
- Pat McNamee (2019)

Member of Armagh City and District Council
- In office 7 June 2001 – 5 May 2005
- Preceded by: Séan McGirr
- Succeeded by: Noel Sheridan
- Constituency: Armagh City

Member of the Northern Ireland Assembly for Newry and Armagh
- In office 25 June 1998 – 26 November 2003
- Preceded by: New Creation
- Succeeded by: Davy Hyland

Member of Newry and Mourne District Council
- In office 21 May 1997 – 7 June 2001
- Preceded by: Jim McAllister
- Succeeded by: Terry Hearty
- Constituency: Slieve Gullion

Member of the Northern Ireland Forum for Newry and Armagh
- In office 30 May 1996 – 25 April 1998
- Preceded by: Forum created
- Succeeded by: Forum dissolved

Personal details
- Born: 12 February 1957 (age 69) County Down, Northern Ireland
- Party: Independent Nationalist (since 2005)
- Other political affiliations: Sinn Féin (until 2005)

Pat McNamee is an Irish nationalist politician in Northern Ireland who was a Member of the Legislative Assembly (MLA) for Newry and Armagh from 1998 to 2003.

Formerly a member of Sinn Féin, McNamee was a Newry and Mourne councillor for the Slieve Gullion DEA from 1997 until 2001.

He moved to Armagh City and District Council in 2001, in which he was elected for the Armagh City DEA. He stood down from elected politics in 2005, and is no longer a member of any political party.

== Background ==
McNamee was educated at St Patrick's College, Armagh, Abbey Grammar School, Newry and at the University of Ulster.

As a member of Sinn Féin, his first electoral success was as a representative on the Northern Ireland Forum, representing Newry and Armagh from the forum's creation in 1996, until it was dissolved in 1998.

The following year, McNamee was elected onto Newry and Mourne District Council, representing the Slieve Gullion District.

At the 1998 Northern Ireland Assembly election, he was elected to the Assembly for Newry and Armagh.

At the 2001 local elections, McNamee was elected to Armagh City and District Council, representing Armagh City.

He did not stand for re-election to the Assembly in 2003, and resigned from Sinn Fein ahead of the 2005 local elections, during which he stood down as a councillor.

When Paul Quinn (21) of Cullyhanna was brutally beaten to death by a gang of men wearing balaclavas and overalls in October 2007, McNamee joined the Quinn Support Group to seek justice for his family.

He contributed to a Spotlight programme on BBC in November 2007 and stated that he believed that 'members of the provisional IRA were responsible for Paul Quinn's death

Northern Ireland Forum
New forum	Member for Newry and Armagh; 1996–1998	Forum dissolved
Northern Ireland Assembly
New assembly	MLA for Newry and Armagh; 1998–2003	Succeeded by Davy Hyland
