= Jim Wells (politician) =

Northern Irish unionist politician

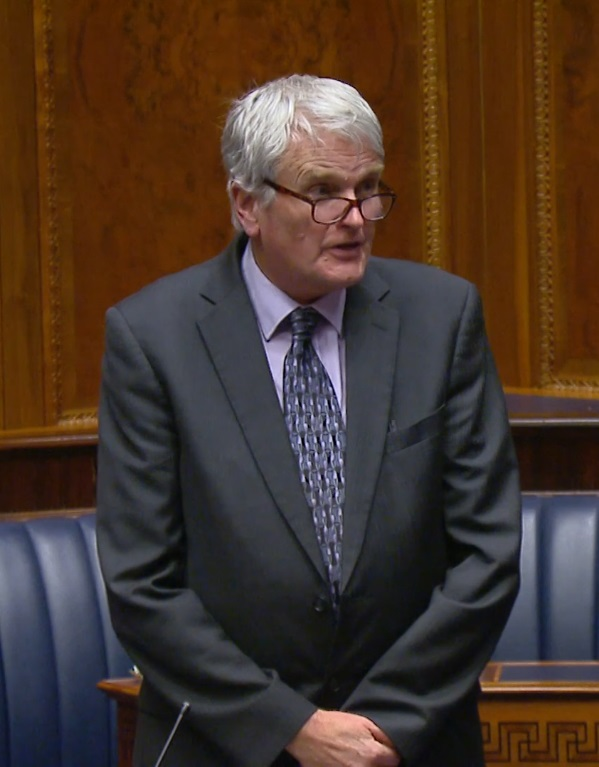
- Wells in 2021

Minister of Health, Social Services and Public Safety
- In office 24 September 2014 – 11 May 2015
- Preceded by: Edwin Poots
- Succeeded by: Simon Hamilton

Deputy Speaker of the Northern Ireland Assembly
- Interim; 11 May 2006 – 30 January 2007

Member of the Northern Ireland Assembly for South Down
- In office 25 June 1998 – 28 March 2022
- Preceded by: New Creation
- Succeeded by: Diane Forsythe
- In office 20 October 1982 – 1986
- Preceded by: Assembly re-established
- Succeeded by: Assembly dissolved

Member of Down District Council
- In office 7 June 2001 – 5 May 2011
- Preceded by: William Alexander
- Succeeded by: Garth Craig
- Constituency: Ballynahinch

Member of Banbridge District Council
- In office 15 May 1985 – 17 May 1989
- Preceded by: District created
- Succeeded by: Margaret Walker
- Constituency: Banbridge Town

Member of Lisburn City Council
- In office 20 May 1981 – 15 May 1985
- Preceded by: Charles Woodburne
- Succeeded by: District abolished
- Constituency: Lisburn Area A

Personal details
- Born: 27 April 1957 (age 69) Lurgan, Northern Ireland
- Party: TUV (since 2024); DUP (1976–2022)
- Other political affiliations: Independent Unionist (2022–2024)
- Spouse: Grace Wells
- Children: 3
- Education: Queen's University, Belfast
- Website: DUP

Jim Wells (born 27 April 1957) is a Northern Irish unionist politician who was Minister of Health, Social Services and Public Safety from 2014 to 2015. He additionally served on an interim basis as deputy speaker of the Northern Ireland Assembly between 2006 and 2007.

Formerly a member of the Democratic Unionist Party (DUP), Wells served as a Member of the Legislative Assembly (MLA) for South Down from 1998 to 2022. He was one of the longest-serving MLAs at the time of his retirement in 2022.

Wells was a Down District councillor for the Ballynahinch DEA from 2001 until 2011

== Professional career ==
Wells was employed as a manager by the National Trust from 1989 until 1998. In 2017, he resigned his membership of the National Trust over a number of issues connected to gay pride.

== Political career ==
Wells was elected to serve as a Councillor in Down District Council in 2001, having previously held a seat on Lisburn Borough Council and Banbridge District Council. He served on the council until stepping down at the 2011 election. He was Assembly Member for the South Down constituency initially from 1982 to 1986. He was elected to the new Assembly in 1998 and is currently in his fifth term having been re-elected in 2017. During that time he served as Deputy Chair of the Committee for Health, Social Services and Public Safety before he was appointed as Minister of Health in September 2014 where he served until his removal in May 2015.

Wells had the party whip withdrawn in May 2018 after he criticised the leadership in the media for reneging on a promise to reinstate him as a minister. In September 2019 he said he did not believe the party would select him to stand for election again.

On 27 January 2022, the DUP deselected Jim Wells ahead of the 2022 Assembly Elections. He was not approved as a candidate for the seat in South Down. On 12 April, Wells announced he had resigned from the DUP. On the same day, he endorsed South Down TUV candidate Harold McKee over his former party's nominee Diane Forsythe.

== Personal views ==
Wells is an evangelical Christian and is an outspoken proponent regarding conservative Christian principles. He describes himself as 'pro-life' and 'pro-traditional marriage'.

Wells believes in Young Earth creationism and advocates for creationism to be "taught in every school". Along with his DUP colleagues, Nelson McCausland and Gregory Campbell, he lobbied for creationism to be included in the Giant's Causeway Exhibition Centre. Initially the National Trust acceded to the request, but withdrew the exhibition in 2012 after coming under pressure from the public. Wells is not alone in his creationist views. In 2013 some 40% of DUP activists believe that creationism should be taught in science classes, a Belfast Telegraph survey found.

In a 1985 interview, Wells explained his view of Ulster Protestant identity:

I think we regard ourselves as more British than the British. I think we're the first to stand for the National Anthem and to show respect for the Queen, even more so than many mainland British subjects, many of whom have intermarried with Pakistanis and West Indians and allowed a dilution of their Britishness. That hasn't happened here and we remain militant British subjects. Here there's been very little intermarriage with immigrants or with native Irish. And mixed marriage is frowned upon; I only know of one mixed marriage in my experience.

== Controversy ==
Wells had been tipped to become Northern Ireland's Health Minister during a midterm reshuffle of DUP Ministers. However, this failed to be realised as many within his party thought him too gaffe prone to hold the position. He continued to court controversy over his views on abortion, gay rights and Pride marches. Wells stated in 2012 that abortion in Northern Ireland should remain illegal except in medical emergencies, without exception for pregnancies resulting from rape.

Many political commentators and critics had claimed that the gaffe prone MLA would not be offered the role in the near future because of the importance of implementing health reform known as "Transforming your Care". It was widely believed that the then Health Minister Edwin Poots was seen by his party as a safer pair of hands to handle the review. However, in an unexpected turn of events, the DUP leader Peter Robinson dismissed Edwin Poots and appointed Wells to the Health role in September 2014.

On 21 January 2015, Wells said he continues to support a ban on gay men donating blood. Such bans were lifted in the rest of the UK in 2011; Wells's department had spent £39,000 as of January 2015 fighting a legal appeal of the ban.

In 2015 he also said "The gay lobby is insatiable, they don’t know when enough is enough".

On 6 June 2018, Wells compared abortion to the Nazi Holocaust on BBC Radio Ulster's Nolan Show, describing the calls for Westminster to change Northern Ireland's abortion laws as a "ghastly situation". He would later go on to clarify that he only meant to make the comparison to the Holocaust in relation to the "numbers" involved. Arlene Foster responded to Wells comments by saying "I think it's the wrong use of language" when discussing a "very emotive issue".

== Resignation as Health Minister ==
During a hustings event on 23 April 2015, Wells was quoted as saying: "All evidence throughout the world says the best way to raise children is in a loving, stable, married relationship; the facts show that, the facts show that certainly you don't bring a child up in a homosexual relationship. That a child is far more likely to be abused or neglected (uproar among audience). I say again, I say again, a child is far more likely to be abused or neglected in a non-stable marriage situation, gay or straight."

Wells retracted the statement after a backlash from political leaders and the media. He claimed he was under pressure as a result of his wife's serious illness and that his view was not DUP policy. The views attracted strong criticism from other parties and calls for his resignation. On 24 April 2015, the Police Service of Northern Ireland confirmed that they had received a complaint and officers were making enquiries. The Public Prosecution Service later confirmed that Wells would not be charged. By mid October 2015 the Public Prosecution Service said it was decided that the case did not meet the test for prosecution.

On 25 April 2015, it was alleged that Wells, who was doing door-to-door canvassing, called at a lesbian couple's house and during a conversation was critical of their lifestyle. The PSNI said they had received three complaints regarding Wells's conduct in the incident in Rathfriland. Two days later, Wells announced his resignation as Health Minister, citing his wife's ill health. In August 2016 a woman was convicted and sentenced to three months in jail after pleading guilty to making false statements to police about Wells, including that she had been present at the Rathfriland incident.

By the end of Wells' short tenure as Health minister little had changed and no major health reforms had been progressed. By July 2015, Wells was still stinging from his forced removal from health and stated that "I should still be a Minister".

Following his resignation, Wells continued to serve as an MLA. He has since commented on his resignation, stating on Belfast Live: "After four decades of work and dedication to the public I basically landed on the scrap heap because I felt I had to resign. I was abused and accused and it was all nonsense but for the sake of the DUP, I had to go, I had to sacrifice myself."

== Loss of party whip and resignation ==
Approaching the third anniversary of his sacking as Health Minister, Wells made allegations in the Belfast Telegraph in April 2018, that special advisors, the Press office and Leadership of the DUP reneged on a promise to re-instate him as health Minister. On Monday 9 April he appeared on Talkback and criticised the DUP leadership, press office and special advisors. As a result of his attacks, the party withdrew the whip from Wells in May 2018. This reduced the DUP to 27 seats in the Assembly, the same number as Sinn Féin.

On 23 March 2022, Wells announced on The Nolan Show that he would not seek re-election at 2022 Northern Ireland Assembly election. Furthermore, with the whip still removed, Wells resigned from the DUP on 12 April 2022 and announced that he would be supporting the Traditional Unionist Voice's Harold McKee for his old seat.

At the TUV's campaign launch for the 2024 general election, Wells was announced as their candidate in South Down. He polled 1,893 votes (4.2%), coming fifth.

In November 2024, Wells alleged that former DUP leader Ian Paisley was "kept in the dark" over his party’s talks with Sinn Féin while the DUP's public stance was to shun republicans. He said he now regrets the attacks on the late David Trimble and the Ulster Unionist Party (UUP) and that Trimble's widow, Daphne Trimble, deserves an apology.

Northern Ireland Assembly (1982)
New assembly	MPA for South Down; 1982–1986	Assembly abolished
Northern Ireland Assembly
New assembly	MLA for Down South; 1998–2022	Succeeded by Diane Forsythe
Political offices
Preceded by Edwin Poots	Minister of Health, Social Services and Public Safety; 2014–2015	Succeeded by Simon Hamilton
