= 1981 Down District Council election =

Local govt election in Northern Ireland

← 1977	20 May 1981	1985 →

All 20 seats to Down District Council 11 seats needed for a majority
	First party	Second party	Third party
Party	SDLP	UUP	DUP
Seats won	9	5	3
Seat change	▼1	▼2	▲3
	Fourth party	Fifth party	Sixth party
Party	Alliance	Republican Clubs	Independent Labour
Seats won	1	1	1
Seat change	▼2	▲1	▲1

Elections to Down District Council were held on 20 May 1981 on the same day as the other Northern Irish local government elections. The election used three district electoral areas to elect a total of 20 councillors.

== Election results ==
Down District Council Election Result 1981
Party	Seats	Gains	Losses	Net gain/loss	Seats %	Votes %	Votes	+/−
SDLP	9	0	1	▼1	45.0	42.1	10,233	▼2.5
UUP	5	0	2	▼2	25.0	27.3	6,694	▼4.1
DUP	3	3	0	▲3	15.0	13.0	3,188	New
Alliance	1	0	2	▼2	5.0	8.4	2,055	▼3.4
Republican Clubs	1	1	0	▲1	5.0	6.5	1,587	▲3.9
Independent Labour	1	1	0	▲1	5.0	2.7	665	▲2.7
Independent	0	0	0	0	0.0	0.3	74	▼3.2

Note: "Votes" are the first preference votes.

== Districts summary ==
Results of the Down District Council election, 1981 by district
Ward	%	Cllrs	%	Cllrs	%	Cllrs	%	Cllrs	%	Cllrs	%	Cllrs	Total Cllrs
Ward	SDLP		UUP		DUP		Alliance		Workers Party		Others		Total Cllrs
Area A	24.4	2	43.0	3	24.4	2	7.3	0	0.0	0	0.9	0	7
Area B	50.5	3	17.5	1	0.0	0	9.5	0	14.1	1	8.4	1	6
Area C	51.2	4	20.8	1	13.9	1	8.4	1	5.7	0	0.0	0	7
Total	42.1	9	27.3	5	13.0	3	8.4	1	6.5	1	2.7	1	20

== Districts results ==
=== Area A ===
1977: 4 x UUP, 2 x SDLP, 1 x Alliance
1981: 3 x UUP, 2 x SDLP, 2 x DUP
1977-1981 Change: DUP (two seats) gain from UUP and Alliance

Down Area A - 7 seats
Party	Candidate	FPv%	Count										
Party	Candidate	FPv%	1	2	3	4	5	6	7	8	9	10	11
DUP	Cecil Harvey	16.52%	1,387										
SDLP	Francis Laverty*	9.63%	809	810.2	820.2	820.2	829.2	829.2	830.2	1,064.2			
UUP	Samuel Osborne*	11.36%	954	973.92	974.92	977.16	1,007.4	1,012.72	1,038.44	1,041.68	1,078.68		
SDLP	Monica Smyth	8.94%	751	751.48	765.48	765.48	779.48	779.48	703.4	1,021.96	1,272.96		
UUP	Dermot Nesbitt	8.72%	732	744.96	744.96	772.96	779.96	785.84	965.48	967.2	999.2	1,018.2	1,036.6
UUP	William Brown*	7.63%	641	652.04	652.04	823.16	828.16	834.36	899.32	899.32	946.56	964.56	969.16
DUP	Thomas Poole	5.68%	477	619.32	621.32	632.28	633.52	888.76	901.44	902.44	906.44	909.44	909.44
UUP	William Finlay*	7.80%	655	667.72	668.72	704.72	707.72	733.36	822.04	827.04	870.28	882.28	887.8
Alliance	John Rodgers	3.88%	326	326.48	351.48	353.48	551.48	551.48	552.48	566.72			
SDLP	Thomas Murray	5.82%	489	490.68	500.68	500.92	512.92	513.92	515.92				
UUP	James Glover	4.23%	355	361.24	364.24	385.48	386.48	391.92					
DUP	Thomas McKee	2.23%	187	302.2	304.2	307.44	307.44						
Alliance	Wanda Rowan-Hamilton	3.41%	286	286.48	286.48	287.48							
UUP	William Cochrane	3.27%	275	280.28	280.28								
Independent	Francis Rice	0.60%	50	50									
Independent	Eileen Rice	0.29%	24	24									
Electorate: 11,993 Valid: 8,398 (70.02%) Spoilt: 216 Quota: 1,050 Turnout: 8,614 (71.83%)

=== Area B ===
1977: 4 x SDLP, 1 x UUP, 1 x Alliance
1981: 3 x SDLP, 1 x UUP, 1 x Republican Clubs, 1 x Independent Labour
1977-1981 Change: Republican Clubs and Independent Labour gain from SDLP and Alliance

Down Area B - 6 seats
Party	Candidate	FPv%	Count							
Party	Candidate	FPv%	1	2	3	4	5	6	7	8
SDLP	Eddie McGrady*	21.56%	1,711							
Republican Clubs	Raymond Blaney	14.13%	1,121	1,153.64						
SDLP	Dermot Curran*	11.25%	893	987.52	1,016.9	1,178.9				
UUP	Cecil Maxwell*	11.03%	875	882.14	894.82	905.5	1,403.5			
SDLP	John Ritchie*	8.15%	647	787.08	803.76	869.48	869.48	874.48	880.48	1,171.48
Independent Labour	Malachi Curran	8.38%	665	691.86	717.9	763.74	764.74	779.74	788.14	994.8
Alliance	George Flinn*	5.68%	451	461.2	634.2	652.92	659.92	822.92	823.82	902.56
SDLP	Sean Quinn*	4.70%	373	552.18	580.86	723.34	724.34	727.34	756.74	
UUP	Elizabeth Kennedy	6.46%	513	513	515	515				
SDLP	John Bryce	4.81%	382	455.78	461.46					
Alliance	Michael Healy	3.84%	305	312.82						
Electorate: 10,747 Valid: 7,936 (73.84%) Spoilt: 252 Quota: 1,134 Turnout: 8,188 (76.19%)

=== Area C ===
1977: 4 x SDLP, 2 x UUP, 1 x Alliance
1981: 4 x SDLP, 1 x UUP, 1 x Alliance, 1 x DUP
1977-1981 Change: DUP gain from UUP

Down Area C - 7 seats
Party	Candidate	FPv%	Count									
Party	Candidate	FPv%	1	2	3	4	5	6	7	8	9	10
SDLP	Patrick O'Donoghue*	16.27%	1,328									
DUP	Ethel Smyth*	13.93%	1,137									
UUP	Gerald Douglas	11.50%	939	940.15	991.35	994.35	1,097.35					
SDLP	Eamon O'Neill*	10.07%	822	939.53	939.93	949.93	954.41	954.41	1,068.41			
SDLP	James Curry	9.34%	762	828.47	828.47	847.16	856.49	856.49	960.38	1,152.38		
SDLP	James Magee*	10.12%	826	857.05	857.05	861.28	861.28	861.28	900.26	1,099.26		
Alliance	Patrick Forde*	5.97%	487	498.27	500.47	502.47	661.39	670.87	732.48	758.51	810.51	852.51
UUP	Norman Bicker*	7.02%	573	573	595.9	601.33	711.06	776.63	778.09	781.32	784.32	791.32
SDLP	Stephen McClean	5.39%	440	477.49	477.49	482.72	485.95	486.74	535.18			
Workers' Party	Edward O'Hagan	4.28%	349	376.14	376.34	442.95	447.95	447.95				
UUP	William Keown	2.23%	182	182.23	211.63	211.63						
Alliance	Anthony Dickinson	2.45%	200	203.22	203.92	205.92						
Republican Clubs	David Allister	1.43%	117	120.22	120.42							
Electorate: 11,077 Valid: 8,162 (73.68%) Spoilt: 251 Quota: 1,021 Turnout: 8,413 (75.95%)
