= 1977 Down District Council election =

Local govt election in Northern Ireland

← 1973	18 May 1977	1981 →

All 20 seats to Down District Council 11 seats needed for a majority
	First party	Second party	Third party
Party	SDLP	UUP	Alliance
Seats won	10	7	3
Seat change	▲2	▼1	▲1
	Fourth party	Fifth party
Party	Vanguard	Independent
Seats won	0	0
Seat change	▼1	▼1

Elections to Down District Council were held on 18 May 1977 on the same day as the other Northern Irish local government elections. The election used three district electoral areas to elect a total of 20 councillors.

== Election results ==
Down District Council Election Result 1977
Party	Seats	Gains	Losses	Net gain/loss	Seats %	Votes %	Votes	+/−
SDLP	10	2	0	▲2	50.0	44.6	9,251	▲9.6
UUP	7	0	1	▼1	35.0	31.4	6,520	▼7.2
Alliance	3	1	0	▲1	15.0	11.8	2,446	▼0.5
Independent	0	0	1	▼1	0.0	3.5	736	▼3.6
Unionist Party NI	0	0	0	Steady	0.0	3.3	700	New
UUUP	0	0	0	Steady	0.0	2.7	569	New
Republican Clubs	0	0	0	Steady	0.0	2.6	536	▲0.2

Note: "Votes" are the first preference votes.

== Districts summary ==
Results of the Down District Council election, 1977 by district
Ward	%	Cllrs	%	Cllrs	%	Cllrs	%	Cllrs	Total Cllrs
Ward	SDLP		UUP		Alliance		Others		Total Cllrs
Area A	19.9	2	50.1	4	13.5	1	16.5	0	7
Area B	58.8	4	18.4	1	8.5	1	14.3	0	6
Area C	53.4	4	26.9	2	13.5	1	6.2	0	7
Total	44.6	10	31.4	7	11.8	3	12.2	0	20

== Districts results ==
=== Area A ===
1973: 4 x UUP, 1 x SDLP, 1 x Alliance, 1 x Vanguard
1977: 4 x UUP, 2 x SDLP, 1 x Alliance
1973-1977 Change: SDLP gain from Vanguard

Down Area A - 7 seats
Party	Candidate	FPv%	Count									
Party	Candidate	FPv%	1	2	3	4	5	6	7	8	9	10
SDLP	Patrick Smyth*	12.65%	837									
UUP	Samuel Osborne*	9.54%	631	638	638	663	663	668	841			
Alliance	Denis Rowan-Hamilton*	7.98%	528	534	534.33	573.33	577.35	638.42	652.42	904.42		
UUP	Edward McVeigh*	11.08%	733	736	736.03	770.03	773.03	773.04	803.04	813.09	823.82	963.82
UUP	William Finlay*	9.13%	604	605	605	622	622.01	622.01	646.01	648.01	650.6	849.6
UUP	William Brown	9.02%	597	601	601	621	621	621.01	634.01	635.01	640.19	801.56
SDLP	Francis Laverty	3.89%	257	260	264.88	267.9	449.39	605.83	605.83	717.4	774.01	778.09
UUUP	Andrew Gaskin	8.60%	569	570	570.01	572.01	572.01	573.01	580.01	582.01	582.01	603.01
UUP	William Cochrane*	7.07%	468	475	475.04	517.04	518.06	524.07	548.07	548.09	549.57	
Alliance	John Rodgers	5.47%	362	365	365.64	379.64	404.69	428.76	429.76			
UUP	Hugh Martin	4.22%	279	280	280	288	288	290.01				
Independent	George Kerr	4.05%	268	268	268.58	269.58	273.69					
SDLP	Allen Gilgunn	3.33%	220	220	221.7	223.71						
Unionist Party NI	William Hutton	2.45%	162	221	221.03							
Unionist Party NI	John McKee	1.51%	100									
Electorate: 11,641 Valid: 6,615 (56.83%) Spoilt: 221 Quota: 827 Turnout: 6,836 (58.72%)

=== Area B ===
1973: 3 x SDLP, 1 x UUP, 1 x Alliance, 1 x Independent
1977: 4 x SDLP, 1 x UUP, 1 x Alliance
1973-1977 Change: SDLP gain from Independent

Down Area B - 6 seats
Party	Candidate	FPv%	Count									
Party	Candidate	FPv%	1	2	3	4	5	6	7	8	9	10
SDLP	Eddie McGrady*	21.72%	1,524									
SDLP	Dermot Curran*	14.17%	994	1,069.48								
UUP	Cecil Maxwell*	12.09%	848	853.44	854.34	862.68	873.68	903.36	1,325.36			
SDLP	John Ritchie*	8.48%	595	694.96	707.56	722.52	738.18	771.2	771.88	772.88	1,153.76	
SDLP	Sean Quinn	7.81%	548	755.06	780.86	806.16	823.2	921.78	924.76	925.76	1,153.76	
Alliance	George Flinn	5.20%	365	373.84	374.74	388.42	564.76	618.46	631.46	768.46	793.66	833.66
Republican Clubs	Raymond Blaney	7.64%	536	551.64	554.04	586.72	593.72	661.34	662.34	680.34	735.08	782.08
SDLP	Theresa McEvoy	6.66%	467	525.48	540.18	551.86	556.88	614.5	615.5	616.5		
UUP	Robert Nicholson	6.30%	442	443.7	444	448	451	454				
Independent	John Bryce	4.12%	289	308.04	313.14	376.18	384.54					
Alliance	William McNamara	3.26%	229	242.94	244.74	250.08						
Independent	James McDowell	2.55%	179	187.16	188.66							
Electorate: 10,436 Valid: 7,016 (67.23%) Spoilt: 262 Quota: 1,003 Turnout: 7,278 (69.74%)

=== Area C ===
1973: 4 x SDLP, 3 x UUP
1977: 4 x SDLP, 2 x UUP, 1 x Alliance
1977-1981 Change: Alliance gain from UUP

Down Area C - 7 seats
Party	Candidate	FPv%	Count							
Party	Candidate	FPv%	1	2	3	4	5	6	7	8
SDLP	Patrick O'Donoghue*	18.73%	1,335							
SDLP	Eamon O'Neill	9.13%	651	814.35	824.67	824.67	898.89			
UUP	Ethel Smyth	11.04%	787	787	799	851	857.66	1,155.66		
UUP	Norman Bicker	9.30%	663	663	671	829	837.66	1,042.66		
Alliance	Patrick Forde	5.92%	422	429.59	539.25	620.58	818.87	844.87	901.87	
SDLP	Jarlath Carey*	9.02%	643	772.36	789.02	794.02	845.23	847.56	849.56	860.56
SDLP	James Magee	9.64%	687	713.4	728.73	729.73	744.03	746.03	747.03	753.03
SDLP	James McClean	6.92%	493	556.69	561.35	561.35	578.99	579.99	581.99	583.99
UUP	William Keown	6.57%	468	468.66	477.66	544.66	555.32			
Alliance	Joseph Keenan	5.11%	364	402.94	421.27	442.27				
Unionist Party NI	John Beck	4.66%	332	332.33	409.33					
Alliance	Patrick Doherty	2.47%	176	180.29						
Unionist Party NI	Henry Cromie	1.49%	106	106.66						
Electorate: 10,834 Valid: 7,127 (65.78%) Spoilt: 398 Quota: 891 Turnout: 7,525 (69.46%)
