= 1993 Down District Council election =

Local govt election in Northern Ireland

← 1989	19 May 1993	1997 →

All 23 seats to Down District Council 12 seats needed for a majority
	First party	Second party	Third party
Party	SDLP	UUP	DUP
Seats won	13	7	3
Seat change	▲1	▼1	▲1
	Fourth party
Party	Alliance
Seats won	0
Seat change	▼1
- Party with the most votes by district.

Elections to Down District Council were held on 19 May 1993 on the same day as the other Northern Irish local government elections. The election used four district electoral areas to elect a total of 23 councillors.

== Election results ==
Down District Council Election Result 1993
Party	Seats	Gains	Losses	Net gain/loss	Seats %	Votes %	Votes	+/−
SDLP	13	1	0	▲1	56.5	51.2	13,102	▲2.0
UUP	7	0	1	▼1	30.4	28.5	7,300	▼2.6
DUP	3	1	0	▲1	13.0	9.9	2,545	▲1.4
Alliance	0	0	1	▼1	0.0	3.8	971	▲1.6
Sinn Féin	0	0	0	0	0.0	3.2	815	▼1.6
Independent	0	0	0	0	0.0	2.7	694	▲2.7
Workers' Party	0	0	0	0	0.0	0.6	151	▼1.0

Note: "Votes" are the first preference votes.

== Districts summary ==
Results of the Down District Council election, 1993 by district
Ward	%	Cllrs	%	Cllrs	%	Cllrs	%	Cllrs	Total Cllrs
Ward	SDLP		UUP		DUP		Others		Total Cllrs
Ballynahinch	49.4	2	30.8	2	19.8	1	0.0	0	5
Downpatrick	65.3	6	13.4	1	0.0	0	21.3	0	7
Newcastle	56.4	4	20.9	1	6.7	1	16.0	0	6
Rowallane	29.0	1	54.4	3	16.6	1	0.0	0	5
Total	51.2	13	28.5	7	9.9	3	10.4	0	23

== District results ==
=== Ballynahinch ===
1989: 2 x SDLP, 2 x UUP, 1 x DUP
1993: 2 x SDLP, 2 x UUP, 1 x DUP
1989-1993 Change: No change

Ballynahinch - 5 seats
Party	Candidate	FPv%	Count		
Party	Candidate	FPv%	1	2	3
SDLP	Patrick Toman*	25.41%	1,480		
SDLP	Anne Marie McAleenan	23.97%	1,396		
DUP	William Alexander	19.81%	1,154		
UUP	James Cochrane*	16.12%	939	1,025	
UUP	Walter Lyons*	8.38%	488	648	867
UUP	Janet Crothers	6.32%	368	450	583
Electorate: 8,953 Valid: 5,825 (65.06%) Spoilt: 132 Quota: 971 Turnout: 5,957 (66.54%)

=== Downpatrick ===
1989: 5 x SDLP, 1 x UUP, 1 x Alliance
1993: 6 x SDLP, 1 x UUP
1989-1993 Change: SDLP gain from Alliance

Downpatrick - 7 seats
Party	Candidate	FPv%	Count										
Party	Candidate	FPv%	1	2	3	4	5	6	7	8	9	10	11
SDLP	Dermot Curran*	14.30%	1,075										
SDLP	John Doris*	13.79%	1,037										
SDLP	John Ritchie*	13.71%	1,031										
UUP	Jack McIlheron	13.37%	1,005										
SDLP	Malachi Curran*	9.63%	724	800.18	829.28	858.26	859.69	874.21	912.37	957.37			
SDLP	Francis McCann	7.57%	569	582	625.4	643.4	643.62	657.8	662.06	694.44	729.72	781.35	787.83
SDLP	Owen Adams	6.33%	476	489.52	506.72	539.39	540.27	543.56	552.95	585.08	634.5	714.13	724.39
Alliance	Michael Healy*	5.89%	443	447.55	449.75	452.09	488.94	516.91	534.34	544.6	592.25	720.56	721.1
Independent	Keith Bradford	3.87%	291	293.47	295.87	298.39	312.69	340.4	351.17	383.5	409.54		
Independent	Patrick O'Connor	3.14%	236	244.45	244.55	245.18	249.14	258.32	340.86	365.35			
Sinn Féin	Patrick McGreevy	4.18%	314	316.6	317.6	318.32	318.54	324.82	328.21				
Independent	James Masson	2.22%	167	175.84	176.14	176.23	178.87	180.87					
Workers' Party	Desmond O'Hagan	2.01%	151	151.65	152.65	154	155.87						
Electorate: 12,290 Valid: 7,519 (61.18%) Spoilt: 150 Quota: 940 Turnout: 7,669 (62.40%)

=== Newcastle ===
1989: 4 x SDLP, 2 x UUP
1993: 4 x SDLP, 1 x UUP, 1 x DUP
1989-1993 Change: DUP gain from UUP

Newcastle - 6 seats
Party	Candidate	FPv%	Count						
Party	Candidate	FPv%	1	2	3	4	5	6	7
SDLP	Michael Boyd*	21.83%	1,405						
SDLP	Eamon O'Neill*	17.87%	1,150						
UUP	Gerald Douglas*	14.73%	948						
SDLP	Peter Fitzpatrick*	10.36%	667	723	724.98	870.98			
SDLP	Frances Flynn	6.39%	411	631.68	706.86	753.66	760.66	920.9	
DUP	John Finlay	6.68%	430	432.16	432.79	432.79	682.79	684.42	700.95
Alliance	Anne Carr	8.20%	528	571.92	580.53	582.13	637.68	676.05	681.93
Sinn Féin	Sean Fitzpatrick	7.78%	501	521.52	544.62	547.72	547.72		
UUP	William Brown*	6.15%	396	401.04	401.67	401.77			
Electorate: 10,170 Valid: 6,436 (63.28%) Spoilt: 182 Quota: 920 Turnout: 6,618 (65.07%)

=== Rowallane ===
1989: 3 x UUP, 1 x DUP, 1 x SDLP
1993: 3 x UUP, 1 x DUP, 1 x SDLP
1989-1993 Change: No change

Rowallane - 5 seats
Party	Candidate	FPv%	Count	
Party	Candidate	FPv%	1	2
UUP	Samuel Osborne*	22.80%	1,322	
SDLP	Margaret Ritchie*	20.20%	1,171	
UUP	Albert Colmer*	15.21%	882	1,067.36
UUP	William Biggerstaff*	16.42%	952	1,058.12
DUP	William Dick*	16.57%	961	1,017.56
SDLP	Hugh Flynn	8.80%	510	514.76
Electorate: 9,320 Valid: 5,798 (62.21%) Spoilt: 110 Quota: 967 Turnout: 5,908 (63.39%)
