= Down Area C =

District electoral areas in Down, Northern Ireland

Down Area C was one of the three district electoral areas in Down, Northern Ireland which existed from 1973 to 1985. The district elected seven members to Down District Council, and formed part of the South Down constituencies for the Northern Ireland Assembly and UK Parliament.

It was created for the 1973 local elections, and contained the wards of Castlewellan, Donard, Dundrum, Dunmore, Seaforde, Shimna and Tollymore. It was abolished for the 1985 local elections and replaced by the Newcastle DEA and part of the Ballynahinch DEA.

== Councillors ==
Election	Councillor (Party)	Councillor (Party)	Councillor (Party)	Councillor (Party)	Councillor (Party)	Councillor (Party)	Councillor (Party)
1981	Ethel Smyth (DUP)/ (UUP)	Gerald Douglas (UUP)	Patrick Forde (Alliance)	Patrick O'Donoghue (SDLP)	Eamon O'Neill (SDLP)	James Magee (SDLP)	James Curry (SDLP)
1977	Ethel Smyth (DUP)/ (UUP)	Norman Bicker (UUP)	Patrick Forde (Alliance)	Patrick O'Donoghue (SDLP)	Eamon O'Neill (SDLP)	James Magee (SDLP)	Jarlath Carey (SDLP)
1973	William McCombe (UUP)	John Beck (UUP)	Robert Thompson (UUP)	Patrick O'Donoghue (SDLP)	S. Fitzpatrick (SDLP)	Dan Rice (SDLP)	Jarlath Carey (SDLP)

== 1981 Election ==
1977: 4 x SDLP, 2 x UUP, 1 x Alliance

1981: 4 x SDLP, 1 x UUP, 1 x Alliance, 1 x DUP

1977-1981 Change: DUP gain from UUP

Down Area C - 7 seats
Party	Candidate	FPv%	Count									
Party	Candidate	FPv%	1	2	3	4	5	6	7	8	9	10
SDLP	Patrick O'Donoghue*	16.27%	1,328									
DUP	Ethel Smyth*	13.93%	1,137									
UUP	Gerald Douglas	11.50%	939	940.15	991.35	994.35	1,097.35					
SDLP	Eamon O'Neill*	10.07%	822	939.53	939.93	949.93	954.41	954.41	1,068.41			
SDLP	James Curry	9.34%	762	828.47	828.47	847.16	856.49	856.49	960.38	1,152.38		
SDLP	James Magee*	10.12%	826	857.05	857.05	861.28	861.28	861.28	900.26	1,099.26		
Alliance	Patrick Forde*	5.97%	487	498.27	500.47	502.47	661.39	670.87	732.48	758.51	810.51	852.51
UUP	Norman Bicker*	7.02%	573	573	595.9	601.33	711.06	776.63	778.09	781.32	784.32	791.32
SDLP	Stephen McClean	5.39%	440	477.49	477.49	482.72	485.95	486.74	535.18			
Workers' Party	Edward O'Hagan	4.28%	349	376.14	376.34	442.95	447.95	447.95				
UUP	William Keown	2.23%	182	182.23	211.63	211.63						
Alliance	Anthony Dickinson	2.45%	200	203.22	203.92	205.92						
Republican Clubs	David Allister	1.43%	117	120.22	120.42							
Electorate: 11,077 Valid: 8,162 (73.68%) Spoilt: 251 Quota: 1,021 Turnout: 8,413 (75.95%)

== 1977 Election ==
1973: 4 x SDLP, 3 x UUP

1977: 4 x SDLP, 2 x UUP, 1 x Alliance

1977-1981 Change: Alliance gain from UUP

Down Area C - 7 seats
Party	Candidate	FPv%	Count							
Party	Candidate	FPv%	1	2	3	4	5	6	7	8
SDLP	Patrick O'Donoghue*	18.73%	1,335							
SDLP	Eamon O'Neill	9.13%	651	814.35	824.67	824.67	898.89			
UUP	Ethel Smyth	11.04%	787	787	799	851	857.66	1,155.66		
UUP	Norman Bicker	9.30%	663	663	671	829	837.66	1,042.66		
Alliance	Patrick Forde	5.92%	422	429.59	539.25	620.58	818.87	844.87	901.87	
SDLP	Jarlath Carey*	9.02%	643	772.36	789.02	794.02	845.23	847.56	849.56	860.56
SDLP	James Magee	9.64%	687	713.4	728.73	729.73	744.03	746.03	747.03	753.03
SDLP	James McClean	6.92%	493	556.69	561.35	561.35	578.99	579.99	581.99	583.99
UUP	William Keown	6.57%	468	468.66	477.66	544.66	555.32			
Alliance	Joseph Keenan	5.11%	364	402.94	421.27	442.27				
Unionist Party NI	John Beck*	4.66%	332	332.33	409.33					
Alliance	Patrick Doherty	2.47%	176	180.29						
Unionist Party NI	Henry Cromie	1.49%	106	106.66						
Electorate: 10,834 Valid: 7,127 (65.78%) Spoilt: 398 Quota: 891 Turnout: 7,525 (69.46%)

== 1973 Election ==
1973: 4 x SDLP, 3 x UUP

Down Area C - 7 seats
Party	Candidate	FPv%	Count															
Party	Candidate	FPv%	1	2	3	4	5	6	7	8	9	10	11	12	13	14	15	16
UUP	William McCombe	19.45%	1,532															
UUP	John Beck	12.95%	1,020															
SDLP	Patrick O'Donoghue	7.97%	628	628	629	629.03	632.03	637.03	646.03	655.03	660.03	668.03	736.03	751.39	778.39	999.39		
SDLP	S. Fitzpatrick	8.10%	638	638.72	638.72	638.75	638.75	647.75	648.75	655.75	658.75	659.75	681.75	696.75	785.75	914.75	1,023.75	
SDLP	Jarlath Carey	7.35%	579	580.44	580.44	580.65	581.65	584.65	585.65	593.65	600.65	603.65	625.65	648.65	778.65	837.65	930.65	960.86
UUP	Robert Thompson	3.87%	305	823.4	823.4	850.46	850.46	850.49	852.52	860.08	860.08	861.53	872.98	882.18	882.18	883.18	884.18	884.18
SDLP	Dan Rice	7.72%	608	608	609	609.09	610.45	612.45	612.45	616.45	624.45	625.45	627.45	635.45	761.48	782.51	868.51	874.78
Alliance	Anthony Dickinson	5.27%	415	430.12	430.12	431.59	431.59	431.59	434.59	449.95	449.95	539.45	579.62	795.4	802.4	805.43	823.43	825.14
Republican Clubs	Edward O'Hagan	3.82%	301	301.36	304.36	304.36	327.36	352.36	362.36	369.36	473.36	475.36	506.36	514.36	519.39	541.39		
SDLP	James McClean	5.46%	430	430.36	431.36	431.42	435.42	436.42	440.45	441.45	466.45	471.45	487.45	490.45	500.45			
SDLP	M. Fitzpatrick	4.72%	372	372	373	373.06	374.06	374.06	374.06	376.06	379.06	383.06	391.06	404.06				
Alliance	Gerald McCormick	2.82%	222	223.8	223.8	224.04	224.04	224.04	224.04	227.46	229.46	294.82	320.82					
Independent	Joseph Keenan	2.36%	186	187.08	187.08	187.17	188.17	189.17	210.56	259.59	262.59	278.62						
Alliance	Danny Goodman	2.31%	182	184.16	184.16	184.46	184.46	184.46	191.46	196.85	197.85							
Republican Clubs	Patrick Sloan	1.46%	115	115	123	123	139	175	176	176								
Independent	Richard Hall	1.40%	110	112.88	112.88	113.24	113.24	113.24	127.24									
Independent	Hughes	1.08%	85	85.36	85.36	85.45	85.45	85.45										
Republican Clubs	Anthony Small	0.95%	75	75.72	76.72	76.78	82.78											
Republican Clubs	McCusker	0.70%	55	55.36	56.36	56.36												
Republican Clubs	John Sloane	0.22%	17	17														
Electorate: 10,845 Valid: 7,875 (72.61%) Spoilt: 156 Quota: 985 Turnout: 8,031 (74.05%)
