= 1997 Down District Council election =

Local govt election in Northern Ireland

| ← 1993 | 21 May 1997 | 2001 → |

All 23 seats to Down District Council 12 seats needed for a majority
| | First party | Second party | Third party |
|---|---|---|---|
| Party | SDLP | UUP | DUP |
| Seats won | 12 | 6 | 2 |
| Seat change | ▼1 | ▼1 | ▼1 |
| | Fourth party | Fifth party |
| Party | Sinn Féin | NI Women's Coalition |
| Seats won | 2 | 1 |
| Seat change | ▲2 | ▲1 |
- Results by district electoral area, shaded by First Preference Votes.

Elections to Down District Council were held on 21 May 1997 on the same day as the other Northern Irish local government elections. The election used four district electoral areas to elect a total of 23 councillors.

== Election results ==
Down District Council Election Result 1997
| Party | Seats | Gains | Losses | Net gain/loss | Seats % | Votes % | Votes | +/− |
|---|---|---|---|---|---|---|---|---|
| SDLP | 12 | 2 | 1 | ▼1 | 52.2 | 46.0 | 10,481 | ▼5.2 |
| UUP | 6 | 0 | 1 | ▼1 | 26.1 | 24.1 | 5,507 | ▼4.4 |
| DUP | 2 | 0 | 1 | ▼1 | 8.7 | 11.9 | 2,724 | ▲2.0 |
| Sinn Féin | 2 | 2 | 0 | ▲2 | 8.7 | 7.6 | 1,724 | ▲4.4 |
| NI Women's Coalition | 1 | 1 | 0 | ▲1 | 4.3 | 1.9 | 430 | New |
| Alliance | 0 | 0 | 0 | 0 | 0.0 | 3.7 | 850 | ▼0.1 |
| Ind. Unionist | 0 | 0 | 0 | 0 | 0.0 | 2.3 | 521 | ▲2.3 |
| Labour Coalition | 0 | 0 | 0 | 0 | 0.0 | 1.4 | 327 | New |
| Workers' Party | 0 | 0 | 0 | 0 | 0.0 | 0.6 | 132 | 0.0 |
| Green (NI) | 0 | 0 | 0 | 0 | 0.0 | 0.5 | 113 | ▲0.5 |

Note: "Votes" are the first preference votes.

== Districts summary ==
Results of the Down District Council election, 1997 by district
| Ward | % | Cllrs | % | Cllrs | % | Cllrs | % | Cllrs | % | Cllrs | % | Cllrs | Total Cllrs |
| Ward | SDLP | | UUP | | DUP | | Sinn Féin | | NIWC | | Others | | Total Cllrs |
|---|---|---|---|---|---|---|---|---|---|---|---|---|---|
| Ballynahinch | 46.8 | 3 | 24.0 | 1 | 24.9 | 1 | 4.3 | 0 | 0.0 | 0 | 0.0 | 0 | 5 |
| Downpatrick | 61.0 | 5 | 13.2 | 1 | 0.0 | 0 | 10.8 | 1 | 0.0 | 0 | 15.0 | 0 | 7 |
| Newcastle | 47.2 | 3 | 17.6 | 1 | 9.4 | 0 | 14.2 | 1 | 7.4 | 1 | 4.2 | 0 | 6 |
| Rowallane | 26.6 | 1 | 43.9 | 3 | 15.1 | 1 | 0.0 | 0 | 0.0 | 0 | 14.4 | 0 | 5 |
| Total | 46.0 | 12 | 24.1 | 6 | 11.9 | 2 | 7.6 | 2 | 1.9 | 1 | 8.5 | 0 | 23 |

== Districts results ==
=== Ballynahinch ===
1993: 2 x SDLP, 2 x UUP, 1 x DUP
1997: 3 x SDLP, 1 x UUP, 1 x DUP
1993-1997 Change: SDLP gain from UUP

Ballynahinch - 5 seats
| Party | Candidate | FPv% | Count | | | | | |
| Party | Candidate | FPv% | 1 | 2 | 3 | 4 | 5 | 6 |
|---|---|---|---|---|---|---|---|---|
| DUP | William Alexander* | 24.91% | 1,362 | | | | | |
| SDLP | Patrick Toman* | 21.89% | 1,197 | | | | | |
| UUP | Harvey Bicker | 18.11% | 990 | | | | | |
| SDLP | Anne Marie McAleenan* | 17.39% | 951 | | | | | |
| SDLP | Francis Casement | 7.48% | 409 | 413.2 | 672.64 | 821.91 | 823.11 | 856.51 |
| UUP | John Reid | 5.94% | 325 | 769.5 | 772.62 | 776.86 | 851.5 | 852.06 |
| Sinn Féin | John Smyth | 4.28% | 234 | 234.7 | 249.58 | | | |
Electorate: 9,536 Valid: 5,468 (57.34%) Spoilt: 110 Quota: 912 Turnout: 5,578 (58.49%)

=== Downpatrick ===
1993: 6 x SDLP, 1 x UUP
1997: 5 x SDLP, 1 x Sinn Féin, 1 x UUP
1993-1997 Change: Sinn Féin gain from SDLP

Downpatrick - 7 seats
| Party | Candidate | FPv% | Count | | | | | | | | |
| Party | Candidate | FPv% | 1 | 2 | 3 | 4 | 5 | 6 | 7 | 8 | 9 |
|---|---|---|---|---|---|---|---|---|---|---|---|
| SDLP | John Doris* | 16.17% | 991 | | | | | | | | |
| SDLP | Peter Craig | 14.98% | 918 | | | | | | | | |
| UUP | Jack McIlheron* | 13.09% | 802 | | | | | | | | |
| SDLP | Dermot Curran* | 12.20% | 748 | 841.15 | | | | | | | |
| SDLP | Owen Adams* | 7.78% | 477 | 534.5 | 580.91 | 622.71 | 623.31 | 626.13 | 657.29 | 764.52 | 806.52 |
| Sinn Féin | Patrick McGreevy | 10.75% | 659 | 664.29 | 668.88 | 670.4 | 670.4 | 674.1 | 700.09 | 712.23 | 757.15 |
| SDLP | Gerard Mahon | 6.80% | 417 | 431.03 | 455.17 | 465.24 | 465.78 | 469.03 | 476.89 | 623.69 | 654.46 |
| Alliance | Michael Healy | 7.03% | 431 | 437.44 | 444.41 | 448.02 | 472.62 | 476.25 | 536.88 | 542.1 | 594.88 |
| Labour Coalition | Patrick O'Connor | 4.10% | 251 | 253.53 | 255.23 | 255.99 | 256.83 | 269.39 | 323.38 | 329.61 | |
| SDLP | John Irvine | 3.08% | 189 | 225.34 | 277.87 | 291.36 | 291.66 | 293.29 | 307.26 | | |
| Green (NI) | Keith Bradford | 1.84% | 113 | 116.45 | 118.49 | 119.82 | 122.76 | 123.22 | | | |
| Workers' Party | Desmond O'Hagan | 0.93% | 57 | 57.92 | 59.28 | 59.47 | 59.65 | 59.88 | | | |
| Labour Coalition | Edna Furey | 0.67% | 41 | 41.92 | 43.62 | 44.19 | 47.49 | 53.72 | | | |
| Labour Coalition | Michael Kearney | 0.57% | 35 | 37.53 | 43.14 | 43.71 | 44.07 | | | | |
Electorate: 12,631 Valid: 6,129 (48.52%) Spoilt: 80 Quota: 767 Turnout: 6,209 (49.16%)

=== Newcastle ===
1993: 4 x SDLP, 1 x UUP, 1 x DUP
1997: 3 x SDLP, 1 x UUP, 1 x Sinn Féin, 1 x Women's Coalition
1993-1997 Change: Sinn Féin and Women's Coalition gain from SDLP and DUP

Newcastle - 6 seats
| Party | Candidate | FPv% | Count | | | | | | | | |
| Party | Candidate | FPv% | 1 | 2 | 3 | 4 | 5 | 6 | 7 | 8 | 9 |
|---|---|---|---|---|---|---|---|---|---|---|---|
| SDLP | Eamon O'Neill* | 15.63% | 913 | | | | | | | | |
| Sinn Féin | Hugh McDowell | 14.22% | 831 | 837 | | | | | | | |
| UUP | Gerald Douglas* | 13.23% | 773 | 775 | 792 | 1,009 | | | | | |
| SDLP | Carmel O'Boyle | 12.24% | 715 | 733 | 755 | 758 | 758.99 | 1,006.99 | | | |
| SDLP | Peter Fitzpatrick* | 12.08% | 706 | 711 | 723 | 723 | 724.98 | 870.98 | | | |
| NI Women's Coalition | Anne Carr | 7.36% | 430 | 451 | 532 | 540 | 565.74 | 605.73 | 672.73 | 748.13 | 779.13 |
| DUP | Stanley Priestley | 9.45% | 552 | 552 | 554 | 588 | 729.57 | 731.56 | 732.56 | 733.08 | 734.08 |
| SDLP | Frances Flynn* | 7.22% | 422 | 431 | 456 | 459 | 461.97 | | | | |
| UUP | Ronald Richey | 4.43% | 259 | 259 | 271 | | | | | | |
| Alliance | Adrienne Healy | 2.86% | 167 | 175 | | | | | | | |
| Workers' Party | Edward O'Hagan | 1.28% | 75 | | | | | | | | |
Electorate: 10,884 Valid: 5,843 (53.68%) Spoilt: 115 Quota: 835 Turnout: 5,958 (54.74%)

=== Rowallane ===
1993: 3 x UUP, 1 x DUP, 1 x SDLP
1997: 3 x UUP, 1 x DUP, 1 x SDLP
1993-1997 Change: No change

Rowallane - 5 seats
| Party | Candidate | FPv% | Count | | | | |
| Party | Candidate | FPv% | 1 | 2 | 3 | 4 | 5 |
|---|---|---|---|---|---|---|---|
| SDLP | Margaret Ritchie* | 19.44% | 1,044 | | | | |
| UUP | Samuel Osborne* | 15.76% | 846 | 847.96 | 888.24 | 1,105.24 | |
| DUP | William Dick* | 15.09% | 810 | 810.56 | 819.56 | 963.56 | |
| UUP | Albert Colmer* | 15.22% | 817 | 817.84 | 865.26 | 899.26 | |
| UUP | William Biggerstaff* | 12.94% | 695 | 695.28 | 734.28 | 801.56 | 925.56 |
| SDLP | John Moffat | 7.15% | 384 | 516.58 | 584.82 | 602.52 | 605.52 |
| Ind. Unionist | William Walker | 9.70% | 521 | 522.82 | 543.96 | | |
| Alliance | Barry Corscadden | 4.69% | 252 | 255.5 | | | |
Electorate: 10,036 Valid: 5,369 (53.50%) Spoilt: 78 Quota: 895 Turnout: 5,447 (54.27%)
