= 1973 Down District Council election =

Local govt election in Northern Ireland

30 May 1973	1977 →

All 20 seats to Down District Council 11 seats needed for a majority
	First party	Second party	Third party
Party	UUP	SDLP	Alliance
Seats won	8	8	2
	Fourth party	Fifth party
Party	Vanguard	Independent
Seats won	1	1

Elections to Down District Council were held on 30 May 1973 on the same day as the other Northern Irish local government elections. The election used three district electoral areas to elect a total of 20 councillors.

== Election results ==
Party	Seats	±	First Pref. votes	FPv%	±%
UUP	8		8,930	38.6%	
SDLP	8		8,101	35.0%	
Alliance	2		2,847	12.3%	
Independent	1		1,639	7.1%	
Vanguard	1		1,046	4.5%	
Republican Clubs	0		563	2.4%	
Totals	20		23,126	100.0%	—

== Districts summary ==
Results of the Down District Council election, 1973 by district
Ward	%	Cllrs	%	Cllrs	%	Cllrs	%	Cllrs	%	Cllrs	Total Cllrs
Ward	UUP		SDLP		Alliance		Vanguard		Others		Total Cllrs
Area A	53.9	4	19.8	1	11.5	1	12.8	1	2.0	0	7
Area B	23.7	1	45.4	3	15.4	1	0.0	0	15.5	0	6
Area C	36.3	3	41.3	4	10.4	0	0.0	0	12.0	0	7
Total	38.6	8	35.0	8	12.3	2	4.5	1	9.6	1	20

== Districts results ==
=== Area A ===
1973: 4 x UUP, 1 x SDLP, 1 x Alliance, 1 x Vanguard

Down Area A - 7 seats
Party	Candidate	FPv%	Count									
Party	Candidate	FPv%	1	2	3	4	5	6	7	8	9	10
UUP	Edward McVeigh	13.51%	1,099									
Vanguard	John Cleland	12.86%	1,046									
SDLP	Patrick Smyth	12.34%	1,004	1,004	1,018							
UUP	Samuel Osborne	8.35%	679	685.16	694.3	695.37	698.37	706.44	708.64	1,125.64		
Alliance	Denis Rowan-Hamilton	5.46%	444	445.12	455.47	532.54	560.54	864.75	865.11	895.2	899.88	1,173.88
UUP	William Finlay	9.77%	795	801.23	812.51	820.51	822.51	834.51	838.83	872.1	896.02	903.09
UUP	William Cochrane	8.43%	686	695.45	709.66	713.73	714.73	725.8	730.26	820.72	874.28	883.28
UUP	Ben Dickson	6.61%	538	583.43	612.13	617.27	618.27	627.55	632.71	664.49	687.11	694.11
SDLP	Francis Laverty	4.08%	332	332.35	360.42	364.42	607.42	642.42	642.44	642.44	642.44	
UUP	Edward Lennon	7.23%	588	592.13	599.27	600.27	601.27	610.34	613.08			
Alliance	Christopher Gotto	3.52%	286	286.63	298.63	399.7	407.7					
SDLP	D. Rice	3.42%	278	278.07	282.07	296.07						
Alliance	Alison Morton	2.48%	202	202.35	217.42							
Independent	I. Jess	1.95%	159	161.31								
Electorate: 12,148 Valid: 8,136 (66.97%) Spoilt: 101 Quota: 1,018 Turnout: 8,237 (67.81%)

=== Area B ===
1973: 3 x SDLP, 1 x UUP, 1 x Alliance, 1 x Independent

Down Area B - 6 seats
Party	Candidate	FPv%	Count								
Party	Candidate	FPv%	1	2	3	4	5	6	7	8	9
SDLP	Eddie McGrady	17.51%	1,246								
Independent	William Hampton	15.45%	1,099								
SDLP	John Ritchie	7.01%	499	563.08	567.91	577.62	584.12	637.02	656.8	922.12	1,078.12
Alliance	Terence McKee	6.42%	457	470.5	491.57	555.86	692.93	714.12	963.84	992.08	1,033.08
SDLP	Dermot Curran	8.14%	579	600.6	610.61	621.83	633.47	706.44	723.36	813.22	1,018.22
UUP	Cecil Maxwell	12.69%	903	905.7	909.55	912.62	924.62	927.72	946.29	949.82	975.45
UUP	Martin Lowe	11.03%	785	785.18	786.58	788.58	798.58	800.65	809.72	813.72	823.97
SDLP	Owen Adams	4.12%	293	363.38	369.4	372.15	380.19	450.29	473.65	531.57	
SDLP	Daniel Sharvin	5.10%	363	378.66	381.46	383.6	386.67	438.09	454.61		
Alliance	Brendan Rodgers	3.20%	228	237.72	245.56	298.49	370.09	376.29			
SDLP	Aidan Laverty	3.54%	252	268.92	276.97	282.12	287.12				
Alliance	Elsie Flinn	3.06%	218	219.44	222.52	269.74					
Alliance	Patrick McFarlane	2.71%	193	220.2	204.05						
Electorate: 9,757 Valid: 7,115 (72.92%) Spoilt: 104 Quota: 1,017 Turnout: 7,219 (73.99%)

=== Area C ===
1973: 4 x SDLP, 3 x UUP

Down Area C - 7 seats
Party	Candidate	FPv%	Count															
Party	Candidate	FPv%	1	2	3	4	5	6	7	8	9	10	11	12	13	14	15	16
UUP	William McCombe	19.45%	1,532															
UUP	John Beck	12.95%	1,020															
SDLP	Patrick O'Donoghue	7.97%	628	628	629	629.03	632.03	637.03	646.03	655.03	660.03	668.03	736.03	751.39	778.39	999.39		
SDLP	S. Fitzpatrick	8.10%	638	638.72	638.72	638.75	638.75	647.75	648.75	655.75	658.75	659.75	681.75	696.75	785.75	914.75	1,023.75	
SDLP	Jarlath Carey	7.35%	579	580.44	580.44	580.65	581.65	584.65	585.65	593.65	600.65	603.65	625.65	648.65	778.65	837.65	930.65	960.86
UUP	Robert Thompson	3.87%	305	823.4	823.4	850.46	850.46	850.49	852.52	860.08	860.08	861.53	872.98	882.18	882.18	883.18	884.18	884.18
SDLP	Dan Rice	7.72%	608	608	609	609.09	610.45	612.45	612.45	616.45	624.45	625.45	627.45	635.45	761.48	782.51	868.51	874.78
Alliance	Anthony Dickinson	5.27%	415	430.12	430.12	431.59	431.59	431.59	434.59	449.95	449.95	539.45	579.62	795.4	802.4	805.43	823.43	825.14
Republican Clubs	Edward O'Hagan	3.82%	301	301.36	304.36	304.36	327.36	352.36	362.36	369.36	473.36	475.36	506.36	514.36	519.39	541.39		
SDLP	James McClean	5.46%	430	430.36	431.36	431.42	435.42	436.42	440.45	441.45	466.45	471.45	487.45	490.45	500.45			
SDLP	M. Fitzpatrick	4.72%	372	372	373	373.06	374.06	374.06	374.06	376.06	379.06	383.06	391.06	404.06				
Alliance	Gerald McCormick	2.82%	222	223.8	223.8	224.04	224.04	224.04	224.04	227.46	229.46	294.82	320.82					
Independent	Joseph Keenan	2.36%	186	187.08	187.08	187.17	188.17	189.17	210.56	259.59	262.59	278.62						
Alliance	Danny Goodman	2.31%	182	184.16	184.16	184.46	184.46	184.46	191.46	196.85	197.85							
Republican Clubs	Patrick Sloan	1.46%	115	115	123	123	139	175	176	176								
Independent	Richard Hall	1.40%	110	112.88	112.88	113.24	113.24	113.24	127.24									
Independent	Hughes	1.08%	85	85.36	85.36	85.45	85.45	85.45										
Republican Clubs	Anthony Small	0.95%	75	75.72	76.72	76.78	82.78											
Republican Clubs	McCusker	0.70%	55	55.36	56.36	56.36												
Republican Clubs	John Sloane	0.22%	17	17														
Electorate: 10,845 Valid: 7,875 (72.61%) Spoilt: 156 Quota: 985 Turnout: 8,031 (74.05%)
