= Down Area B =

District electoral areas in Down, Northern Ireland

Down Area B was one of the three district electoral areas in Down, Northern Ireland which existed from 1973 to 1985. The district elected six members to Down District Council, and formed part of the South Down constituencies for the Northern Ireland Assembly and UK Parliament.

It was created for the 1973 local elections, and contained the wards of Ardglass, Audley's Acre, Cathedral, Killough, Quoile and Strangford. It was abolished for the 1985 local elections and replaced by the Downpatrick DEA.

== Councillors ==
| Election | Councillor (Party) | Councillor (Party) | Councillor (Party) | Councillor (Party) | Councillor (Party) | Councillor (Party) |
|---|---|---|---|---|---|---|
| 1981 | Cecil Maxwell (UUP) | Eddie McGrady (SDLP) | Dermot Curran (SDLP) | John Ritchie (SDLP) | Raymond Blaney (Republican Clubs) | Malachi Curran (Independent Labour) |
| 1977 | Cecil Maxwell (UUP) | Eddie McGrady (SDLP) | Dermot Curran (SDLP) | John Ritchie (SDLP) | Sean Quinn (SDLP) | George Flinn (Alliance) |
| 1973 | Cecil Maxwell (UUP) | Eddie McGrady (SDLP) | Dermot Curran (SDLP) | John Ritchie (SDLP) | William Hampton (Independent) | Terence McKee (Alliance) |

== 1981 Election ==
1977: 4 x SDLP, 1 x UUP, 1 x Alliance

1981: 3 x SDLP, 1 x UUP, 1 x Republican Clubs, 1 x Independent Labour

1977-1981 Change: Republican Clubs and Independent Labour gain from SDLP and Alliance

Down Area B - 6 seats
| Party | Candidate | FPv% | Count | | | | | | | |
| Party | Candidate | FPv% | 1 | 2 | 3 | 4 | 5 | 6 | 7 | 8 |
|---|---|---|---|---|---|---|---|---|---|---|
| SDLP | Eddie McGrady* | 21.56% | 1,711 | | | | | | | |
| Republican Clubs | Raymond Blaney | 14.13% | 1,121 | 1,153.64 | | | | | | |
| SDLP | Dermot Curran* | 11.25% | 893 | 987.52 | 1,016.9 | 1,178.9 | | | | |
| UUP | Cecil Maxwell* | 11.03% | 875 | 882.14 | 894.82 | 905.5 | 1,403.5 | | | |
| SDLP | John Ritchie* | 8.15% | 647 | 787.08 | 803.76 | 869.48 | 869.48 | 874.48 | 880.48 | 1,171.48 |
| Independent Labour | Malachi Curran | 8.38% | 665 | 691.86 | 717.9 | 763.74 | 764.74 | 779.74 | 788.14 | 994.8 |
| Alliance | George Flinn* | 5.68% | 451 | 461.2 | 634.2 | 652.92 | 659.92 | 822.92 | 823.82 | 902.56 |
| SDLP | Sean Quinn* | 4.70% | 373 | 552.18 | 580.86 | 723.34 | 724.34 | 727.34 | 756.74 | |
| UUP | Elizabeth Kennedy | 6.46% | 513 | 513 | 515 | 515 | | | | |
| SDLP | John Bryce | 4.81% | 382 | 455.78 | 461.46 | | | | | |
| Alliance | Michael Healy | 3.84% | 305 | 312.82 | | | | | | |
Electorate: 10,747 Valid: 7,936 (73.84%) Spoilt: 252 Quota: 1,134 Turnout: 8,188 (76.19%)

== 1977 Election ==
1973: 3 x SDLP, 1 x UUP, 1 x Alliance, 1 x Independent

1977: 4 x SDLP, 1 x UUP, 1 x Alliance

1973-1977 Change: SDLP gain from Independent

Down Area B - 6 seats
| Party | Candidate | FPv% | Count | | | | | | | | | |
| Party | Candidate | FPv% | 1 | 2 | 3 | 4 | 5 | 6 | 7 | 8 | 9 | 10 |
|---|---|---|---|---|---|---|---|---|---|---|---|---|
| SDLP | Eddie McGrady* | 21.72% | 1,524 | | | | | | | | | |
| SDLP | Dermot Curran* | 14.17% | 994 | 1,069.48 | | | | | | | | |
| UUP | Cecil Maxwell* | 12.09% | 848 | 853.44 | 854.34 | 862.68 | 873.68 | 903.36 | 1,325.36 | | | |
| SDLP | John Ritchie* | 8.48% | 595 | 694.96 | 707.56 | 722.52 | 738.18 | 771.2 | 771.88 | 772.88 | 1,153.76 | |
| SDLP | Sean Quinn | 7.81% | 548 | 755.06 | 780.86 | 806.16 | 823.2 | 921.78 | 924.76 | 925.76 | 1,153.76 | |
| Alliance | George Flinn | 5.20% | 365 | 373.84 | 374.74 | 388.42 | 564.76 | 618.46 | 631.46 | 768.46 | 793.66 | 833.66 |
| Republican Clubs | Raymond Blaney | 7.64% | 536 | 551.64 | 554.04 | 586.72 | 593.72 | 661.34 | 662.34 | 680.34 | 735.08 | 782.08 |
| SDLP | Theresa McEvoy | 6.66% | 467 | 525.48 | 540.18 | 551.86 | 556.88 | 614.5 | 615.5 | 616.5 | | |
| UUP | Robert Nicholson | 6.30% | 442 | 443.7 | 444 | 448 | 451 | 454 | | | | |
| Independent | John Bryce | 4.12% | 289 | 308.04 | 313.14 | 376.18 | 384.54 | | | | | |
| Alliance | William McNamara | 3.26% | 229 | 242.94 | 244.74 | 250.08 | | | | | | |
| Independent | James McDowell | 2.55% | 179 | 187.16 | 188.66 | | | | | | | |
Electorate: 10,436 Valid: 7,016 (67.23%) Spoilt: 262 Quota: 1,003 Turnout: 7,278 (69.74%)

== 1973 Election ==
1973: 3 x SDLP, 1 x UUP, 1 x Alliance, 1 x Independent

Down Area B - 6 seats
| Party | Candidate | FPv% | Count | | | | | | | | |
| Party | Candidate | FPv% | 1 | 2 | 3 | 4 | 5 | 6 | 7 | 8 | 9 |
|---|---|---|---|---|---|---|---|---|---|---|---|
| SDLP | Eddie McGrady | 17.51% | 1,246 | | | | | | | | |
| Independent | William Hampton | 15.45% | 1,099 | | | | | | | | |
| SDLP | John Ritchie | 7.01% | 499 | 563.08 | 567.91 | 577.62 | 584.12 | 637.02 | 656.8 | 922.12 | 1,078.12 |
| Alliance | Terence McKee | 6.42% | 457 | 470.5 | 491.57 | 555.86 | 692.93 | 714.12 | 963.84 | 992.08 | 1,033.08 |
| SDLP | Dermot Curran | 8.14% | 579 | 600.6 | 610.61 | 621.83 | 633.47 | 706.44 | 723.36 | 813.22 | 1,018.22 |
| UUP | Cecil Maxwell | 12.69% | 903 | 905.7 | 909.55 | 912.62 | 924.62 | 927.72 | 946.29 | 949.82 | 975.45 |
| UUP | Martin Lowe | 11.03% | 785 | 785.18 | 786.58 | 788.58 | 798.58 | 800.65 | 809.72 | 813.72 | 823.97 |
| SDLP | Owen Adams | 4.12% | 293 | 363.38 | 369.4 | 372.15 | 380.19 | 450.29 | 473.65 | 531.57 | |
| SDLP | Daniel Sharvin | 5.10% | 363 | 378.66 | 381.46 | 383.6 | 386.67 | 438.09 | 454.61 | | |
| Alliance | Brendan Rodgers | 3.20% | 228 | 237.72 | 245.56 | 298.49 | 370.09 | 376.29 | | | |
| SDLP | Aidan Laverty | 3.54% | 252 | 268.92 | 276.97 | 282.12 | 287.12 | | | | |
| Alliance | Elsie Flinn | 3.06% | 218 | 219.44 | 222.52 | 269.74 | | | | | |
| Alliance | Patrick McFarlane | 2.71% | 193 | 220.2 | 204.05 | | | | | | |
Electorate: 9,757 Valid: 7,115 (72.92%) Spoilt: 104 Quota: 1,017 Turnout: 7,219 (73.99%)
