= 1985 Down District Council election =

Local govt election in Northern Ireland

| ← 1981 | 15 May 1985 | 1989 → |

All 23 seats to Down District Council 12 seats needed for a majority
| | First party | Second party | Third party |
|---|---|---|---|
| Party | SDLP | UUP | DUP |
| Seats won | 10 | 7 | 3 |
| Seat change | ▲1 | ▲2 | 0 |
| | Fourth party | Fifth party | Sixth party |
| Party | Sinn Féin | Workers' Party | Alliance |
| Seats won | 2 | 1 | 0 |
| Seat change | ▲2 | 0 | ▼1 |
| | Seventh party |
| Party | Independent Labour |
| Seats won | 0 |
| Seat change | ▼1 |

Elections to Down District Council were held on 15 May 1985 on the same day as the other Northern Irish local government elections. The election used four district electoral areas to elect a total of 23 councillors.

== Election results ==
Down District Council Election Result 1985
| Party | Seats | Gains | Losses | Net gain/loss | Seats % | Votes % | Votes | +/− |
|---|---|---|---|---|---|---|---|---|
| SDLP | 10 | 1 | 0 | ▲1 | 43.5 | 41.6 | 9,851 | ▼0.5 |
| UUP | 7 | 2 | 0 | ▲2 | 30.4 | 30.3 | 7,167 | ▲3.0 |
| DUP | 3 | 0 | 0 | 0 | 13.0 | 12.2 | 2,886 | ▼0.8 |
| Sinn Féin | 2 | 2 | 0 | ▲2 | 0.0 | 6.5 | 1,549 | New |
| Workers' Party | 1 | 0 | 0 | 0 | 4.3 | 4.2 | 993 | ▼2.3 |
| Alliance | 0 | 0 | 1 | ▼1 | 0.0 | 5.2 | 1,237 | ▼3.2 |

Note: "Votes" are the first preference votes.

== Districts summary ==
Results of the Down District Council election, 1985 by district
| Ward | % | Cllrs | % | Cllrs | % | Cllrs | % | Cllrs | % | Cllrs | % | Cllrs | Total Cllrs |
| Ward | SDLP | | UUP | | DUP | | Sinn Féin | | Workers Party | | Others | | Total Cllrs |
|---|---|---|---|---|---|---|---|---|---|---|---|---|---|
| Ballynahinch | 40.5 | 2 | 33.3 | 2 | 18.9 | 1 | 0.0 | 0 | 0.0 | 0 | 7.3 | 0 | 5 |
| Downpatrick | 57.4 | 4 | 16.3 | 1 | 0.0 | 0 | 9.9 | 1 | 9.1 | 1 | 7.3 | 0 | 7 |
| Newcastle | 40.8 | 3 | 22.1 | 1 | 12.0 | 1 | 14.0 | 1 | 5.8 | 0 | 5.3 | 0 | 6 |
| Rowallane | 22.4 | 1 | 55.7 | 3 | 21.9 | 1 | 0.0 | 0 | 0.0 | 0 | 0.0 | 0 | 5 |
| Total | 41.6 | 10 | 30.3 | 7 | 12.2 | 3 | 6.5 | 1 | 4.2 | 1 | 5.2 | 0 | 23 |

== District results ==
=== Ballynahinch ===
1985: 2 x SDLP, 2 x UUP, 1 x DUP

Ballynahinch - 5 seats
| Party | Candidate | FPv% | Count | | | | |
| Party | Candidate | FPv% | 1 | 2 | 3 | 4 | 5 |
|---|---|---|---|---|---|---|---|
| SDLP | James Magee* | 19.00% | 1,020 | | | | |
| UUP | William Brown* | 18.70% | 1,004 | | | | |
| DUP | Thomas Poole* | 13.82% | 742 | 742.24 | 971.24 | | |
| UUP | James Cochrane | 14.57% | 782 | 782 | 822 | 928 | |
| SDLP | Francis Laverty* | 10.36% | 556 | 630.52 | 630.64 | 788.12 | 879.32 |
| SDLP | Patrick Savage | 11.10% | 596 | 635 | 635 | 711.48 | 728.76 |
| Alliance | Patrick Forde* | 7.38% | 396 | 403.44 | 405.44 | | |
| DUP | Stanley Priestley | 5.08% | 273 | 273.12 | | | |
Electorate: 7,947 Valid: 5,369 (67.56%) Spoilt: 111 Quota: 895 Turnout: 5,480 (68.96%)

=== Downpatrick ===
1985: 4 x SDLP, 1 x UUP, 1 x Sinn Féin, 1 x Workers' Party

Downpatrick - 7 seats
| Party | Candidate | FPv% | Count | | | | | | | | |
| Party | Candidate | FPv% | 1 | 2 | 3 | 4 | 5 | 6 | 7 | 8 | 9 |
|---|---|---|---|---|---|---|---|---|---|---|---|
| SDLP | Eddie McGrady* | 26.92% | 1,886 | | | | | | | | |
| UUP | Samuel McCartney | 16.28% | 1,141 | | | | | | | | |
| SDLP | Dermot Curran* | 11.50% | 806 | 963.68 | | | | | | | |
| SDLP | Sean Quinn | 8.26% | 579 | 976.44 | | | | | | | |
| SDLP | John Ritchie* | 6.62% | 464 | 686.48 | 692.72 | 696.34 | 755.7 | 797.94 | 803.1 | 1,008.1 | |
| Sinn Féin | Geraldine Ritchie | 9.90% | 694 | 740.44 | 740.83 | 750.22 | 757.22 | 761.84 | 762.84 | 805.15 | 820.15 |
| Workers' Party | Raymond Blaney* | 7.91% | 554 | 616.1 | 625.85 | 685.18 | 693.86 | 700.46 | 710.85 | 763.26 | 797.26 |
| Alliance | Michael Healy | 4.40% | 308 | 324.74 | 406.64 | 410.89 | 412.71 | 414.69 | 702.8 | 748.39 | 782.39 |
| SDLP | Madge McAvoy | 4.08% | 286 | 375.1 | 377.83 | 382.91 | 403.77 | 434.13 | 443.45 | | |
| Alliance | Margaret Donnelly | 2.95% | 207 | 212.94 | 373.23 | 375.31 | 376.43 | 377.09 | | | |
| Workers' Party | Alan McCullough | 2.95% | 82 | 89.56 | 93.07 | | | | | | |
Electorate: 10,997 Valid: 7,007 (63.72%) Spoilt: 159 Quota: 876 Turnout: 7,166 (65.16%)

=== Newcastle ===
1985: 3 x SDLP, 1 x UUP, 1 x Sinn Féin, 1 x DUP

Newcastle - 6 seats
| Party | Candidate | FPv% | Count | | | | | |
| Party | Candidate | FPv% | 1 | 2 | 3 | 4 | 5 | 6 |
|---|---|---|---|---|---|---|---|---|
| UUP | Gerald Douglas* | 22.06% | 1,350 | | | | | |
| Sinn Féin | Hugh McDowell | 13.97% | 855 | | | | | |
| DUP | Ethel Smyth* | 11.99% | 734 | 1,117.75 | | | | |
| SDLP | Eamon O'Neill* | 13.51% | 827 | 829.52 | 832.08 | 924.08 | | |
| SDLP | Michael Boyd | 13.43% | 822 | 825.24 | 827.16 | 890.16 | | |
| SDLP | James Curry* | 7.25% | 444 | 446.16 | 448.4 | 487.4 | 516.51 | 843.1 |
| Alliance | Anthony Dickinson | 5.33% | 326 | 396.92 | 625.36 | 672.04 | 677.01 | 690.15 |
| SDLP | Peter Fitzpatrick | 6.62% | 405 | 405.72 | 406.36 | 426.72 | 441.53 | |
| Workers' Party | Edward O'Hagan | 4.17% | 255 | 257.52 | 259.76 | | | |
| Workers' Party | Sean Magee | 1.67% | 102 | 103.44 | 103.76 | | | |
Electorate: 8,978 Valid: 6,120 (68.17%) Spoilt: 135 Quota: 875 Turnout: 6,255 (69.67%)

=== Rowallane ===
1985: 3 x UUP, 1 x DUP, 1 x SDLP

Rowallane - 5 seats
| Party | Candidate | FPv% | Count | | | | |
| Party | Candidate | FPv% | 1 | 2 | 3 | 4 | 5 |
|---|---|---|---|---|---|---|---|
| UUP | Dermot Nesbitt* | 22.75% | 1,180 | | | | |
| UUP | Samuel Osborne* | 20.59% | 1,068 | | | | |
| UUP | William Biggerstaff | 12.38% | 642 | 877.44 | | | |
| DUP | William Dick | 14.42% | 748 | 789.58 | 857.98 | 866.82 | |
| SDLP | Margaret Ritchie | 12.13% | 629 | 636.29 | 639.41 | 639.67 | 1,146.67 |
| DUP | Trevor Lennon | 7.50% | 389 | 413.03 | 539.75 | 542.83 | 547.83 |
| SDLP | Oliver Flanagan | 10.24% | 531 | 532.62 | 535.98 | 536.14 | |
Electorate: 7,860 Valid: 5,187 (65.99%) Spoilt: 87 Quota: 865 Turnout: 5,274 (67.10%)
