= Down Area A =

District electoral areas in Down, Northern Ireland

Down Area A was one of the three district electoral areas in Down, Northern Ireland which existed from 1973 to 1985. The district elected seven members to Down District Council, and formed part of the South Down constituencies for the Northern Ireland Assembly and UK Parliament.

It was created for the 1973 local elections, and contained the wards of Ballymaglave, Crossgar, Derryboy, Killyleagh, Kilmore, Market and Saintfield. It was abolished for the 1985 local elections and replaced by the Rowallane DEA and part of the Ballynahinch DEA.

== Councillors ==
Election	Councillor (Party)	Councillor (Party)	Councillor (Party)	Councillor (Party)	Councillor (Party)	Councillor (Party)	Councillor (Party)
1981	Samuel Osborne (UUP)	William Brown (UUP)	Dermot Nesbitt (UUP)	Cecil Harvey (DUP)	Thomas Poole (DUP)	Francis Laverty (SDLP)	Monica Smyth (SDLP)
1977	Samuel Osborne (UUP)	William Brown (UUP)	Edward McVeigh (UUP)	William Finlay (UUP)	Denis Rowan-Hamilton (Alliance)	Francis Laverty (SDLP)	Patrick Smyth (SDLP)
1973	Samuel Osborne (UUP)	William Cochrane (UUP)	Edward McVeigh (UUP)	William Finlay (UUP)	Denis Rowan-Hamilton (Alliance)	John Cleland (Vanguard)	Patrick Smyth (SDLP)

== 1981 Election ==
1977: 4 x UUP, 2 x SDLP, 1 x Alliance

1981: 3 x UUP, 2 x SDLP, 2 x DUP

1977-1981 Change: DUP (two seats) gain from UUP and Alliance

Down Area A - 7 seats
Party	Candidate	FPv%	Count										
Party	Candidate	FPv%	1	2	3	4	5	6	7	8	9	10	11
DUP	'Cecil Harvey	16.52%	1,387										
SDLP	Francis Laverty*	9.63%	809	810.2	820.2	820.2	829.2	829.2	830.2	1,064.2			
UUP	Samuel Osborne*	11.36%	954	973.92	974.92	977.16	1,007.4	1,012.72	1,038.44	1,041.68	1,078.68		
SDLP	Monica Smyth	8.94%	751	751.48	765.48	765.48	779.48	779.48	703.4	1,021.96	1,272.96		
UUP	Dermot Nesbitt	8.72%	732	744.96	744.96	772.96	779.96	785.84	965.48	967.2	999.2	1,018.2	1,036.6
UUP	William Brown*	7.63%	641	652.04	652.04	823.16	828.16	834.36	899.32	899.32	946.56	964.56	969.16
DUP	Thomas Poole	5.68%	477	619.32	621.32	632.28	633.52	888.76	901.44	902.44	906.44	909.44	909.44
UUP	William Finlay*	7.80%	655	667.72	668.72	704.72	707.72	733.36	822.04	827.04	870.28	882.28	887.8
Alliance	John Rodgers	3.88%	326	326.48	351.48	353.48	551.48	551.48	552.48	566.72			
SDLP	Thomas Murray	5.82%	489	490.68	500.68	500.92	512.92	513.92	515.92				
UUP	James Glover	4.23%	355	361.24	364.24	385.48	386.48	391.92					
DUP	Thomas McKee	2.23%	187	302.2	304.2	307.44	307.44						
Alliance	Wanda Rowan-Hamilton	3.41%	286	286.48	286.48	287.48							
UUP	William Cochrane	3.27%	275	280.28	280.28								
Independent	Francis Rice	0.60%	50	50									
Independent	Eileen Rice	0.29%	24	24									
Electorate: 11,993 Valid: 8,398 (70.02%) Spoilt: 216 Quota: 1,050 Turnout: 8,614 (71.83%)

== 1977 Election ==
1973: 4 x UUP, 1 x SDLP, 1 x Alliance, 1 x Vanguard

1977: 4 x UUP, 2 x SDLP, 1 x Alliance

1973-1977 Change: SDLP gain from Vanguard

Down Area A - 7 seats
Party	Candidate	FPv%	Count									
Party	Candidate	FPv%	1	2	3	4	5	6	7	8	9	10
SDLP	Patrick Smyth*	12.65%	837									
UUP	Samuel Osborne*	9.54%	631	638	638	663	663	668	841			
Alliance	Denis Rowan-Hamilton*	7.98%	528	534	534.33	573.33	577.35	638.42	652.42	904.42		
UUP	Edward McVeigh*	11.08%	733	736	736.03	770.03	773.03	773.04	803.04	813.09	823.82	963.82
UUP	William Finlay*	9.13%	604	605	605	622	622.01	622.01	646.01	648.01	650.6	849.6
UUP	William Brown	9.02%	597	601	601	621	621	621.01	634.01	635.01	640.19	801.56
SDLP	Francis Laverty	3.89%	257	260	264.88	267.9	449.39	605.83	605.83	717.4	774.01	778.09
UUUP	Andrew Gaskin	8.60%	569	570	570.01	572.01	572.01	573.01	580.01	582.01	582.01	603.01
UUP	William Cochrane*	7.07%	468	475	475.04	517.04	518.06	524.07	548.07	548.09	549.57	
Alliance	John Rodgers	5.47%	362	365	365.64	379.64	404.69	428.76	429.76			
UUP	Hugh Martin	4.22%	279	280	280	288	288	290.01				
Independent	George Kerr	4.05%	268	268	268.58	269.58	273.69					
SDLP	Allen Gilgunn	3.33%	220	220	221.7	223.71						
Unionist Party NI	William Hutton	2.45%	162	221	221.03							
Unionist Party NI	John McKee	1.51%	100									
Electorate: 11,641 Valid: 6,615 (56.83%) Spoilt: 221 Quota: 827 Turnout: 6,836 (58.72%)

== 1973 Election ==
1973: 4 x UUP, 1 x SDLP, 1 x Alliance, 1 x Vanguard

Down Area A - 7 seats
Party	Candidate	FPv%	Count									
Party	Candidate	FPv%	1	2	3	4	5	6	7	8	9	10
UUP	Edward McVeigh	13.51%	1,099									
Vanguard	John Cleland	12.86%	1,046									
SDLP	Patrick Smyth	12.34%	1,004	1,004	1,018							
UUP	Samuel Osborne	8.35%	679	685.16	694.3	695.37	698.37	706.44	708.64	1,125.64		
Alliance	Denis Rowan-Hamilton	5.46%	444	445.12	455.47	532.54	560.54	864.75	865.11	895.2	899.88	1,173.88
UUP	William Finlay	9.77%	795	801.23	812.51	820.51	822.51	834.51	838.83	872.1	896.02	903.09
UUP	William Cochrane	8.43%	686	695.45	709.66	713.73	714.73	725.8	730.26	820.72	874.28	883.28
UUP	Ben Dickson	6.61%	538	583.43	612.13	617.27	618.27	627.55	632.71	664.49	687.11	694.11
SDLP	Francis Laverty	4.08%	332	332.35	360.42	364.42	607.42	642.42	642.44	642.44	642.44	
UUP	Edward Lennon	7.23%	588	592.13	599.27	600.27	601.27	610.34	613.08			
Alliance	Christopher Gotto	3.52%	286	286.63	298.63	399.7	407.7					
SDLP	D. Rice	3.42%	278	278.07	282.07	296.07						
Alliance	Alison Morton	2.48%	202	202.35	217.42							
Independent	I. Jess	1.95%	159	161.31								
Electorate: 12,148 Valid: 8,136 (66.97%) Spoilt: 101 Quota: 1,018 Turnout: 8,237 (67.81%)
