= 1989 Down District Council election =

Local election in Northern Ireland

- 17 May 1989

All 23 seats to Down District Council 12 seats needed for a majority
	First party	Second party	Third party
Party	SDLP	UUP	DUP
Seats won	12	8	2
Seat change	▲2	▲1	▼1
	Fourth party	Fifth party	Sixth party
Party	Alliance	Sinn Féin	Workers' Party
Seats won	1	0	0
Seat change	▲1	▼2	▼1

Elections to Down District Council were held on 17 May 1989 on the same day as the other Northern Irish local government elections. The election used four district electoral areas to elect a total of 23 councillors.

== Election results ==
Down District Council Election Result 1989
Party	Seats	Gains	Losses	Net gain/loss	Seats %	Votes %	Votes	+/−
SDLP	12	2	0	▲2	52.2	49.2	12,227	▲7.6
UUP	8	1	0	▲1	34.8	31.1	7,716	▲0.8
DUP	2	0	1	▼1	8.7	8.5	2,110	▼3.7
Alliance	1	1	0	▲1	4.3	2.2	534	▼3.0
Sinn Féin	0	0	2	▼2	0.0	4.8	1,194	▼1.7
Workers' Party	0	0	1	▼1	0.0	1.6	393	▼2.6
Ind. Unionist	0	0	0	0	0.0	1.4	351	▲0.8
Independent Labour	0	0	0	0	0.0	0.8	193	▲0.8
Green (NI)	0	0	0	0	0.0	0.4	107	New

Note: "Votes" are the first preference votes.

== Districts summary ==
Results of the Down District Council election, 1989 by district
Ward	%	Cllrs	%	Cllrs	%	Cllrs	%	Cllrs	%	Cllrs	Total Cllrs
Ward	SDLP		UUP		DUP		Alliance		Others		Total Cllrs
Ballynahinch	45.3	2	36.1	2	13.8	1	0.0	0	4.8	0	5
Downpatrick	65.1	5	14.9	1	0.0	0	7.2	1	12.8	0	7
Newcastle	54.2	4	28.1	2	6.9	0	0.0	0	10.8	0	6
Rowallane	26.9	1	50.7	3	16.1	1	0.0	0	6.3	0	5
Total	49.2	12	31.1	8	8.5	2	2.2	1	9.0	0	23

== District results ==
=== Ballynahinch ===
1985: 2 x SDLP, 2 x UUP, 1 x DUP
1989: 2 x SDLP, 2 x UUP, 1 x DUP
1985-1989 Change: No change

Ballynahinch - 5 seats
Party	Candidate	FPv%	Count				
Party	Candidate	FPv%	1	2	3	4	5
SDLP	Patrick Toman	21.33%	1,222				
UUP	James Cochrane*	21.01%	1,204				
SDLP	James Magee*	17.19%	985				
UUP	Walter Lyons	15.08%	864	865.54	1,053.91		
DUP	Thomas Poole*	13.79%	790	791.98	848.47	935.26	967.26
SDLP	Patrick King	6.77%	388	630.88	631.51	632.17	750.17
Sinn Féin	Patrick McGreevy	2.97%	170	180.12	180.12	180.34	
Green (NI)	Philip Allen	1.87%	107	109.2	111.51	115.8	
Electorate: 8,529 Valid: 5,730 (67.18%) Spoilt: 126 Quota: 956 Turnout: 5,856 (68.66%)

=== Downpatrick ===
1985: 4 x SDLP, 1 x UUP, 1 x Sinn Féin, 1 x Workers' Party
1989: 5 x SDLP, 1 x UUP, 1 x Alliance
1985-1989 Change: SDLP and Alliance gain from Sinn Féin and Workers' Party

Downpatrick - 7 seats
Party	Candidate	FPv%	Count					
Party	Candidate	FPv%	1	2	3	4	5	6
SDLP	Dermot Curran*	16.09%	1,198					
UUP	Samuel McCartney*	14.91%	1,110					
SDLP	John Ritchie*	11.93%	888	918.59	927.23	959.23		
SDLP	Sean Quinn*	10.64%	792	823.74	832.38	892.86	983.86	
SDLP	Malachi Curran	9.60%	715	803.55	807.39	854.04	926.81	938.01
SDLP	John Doris	9.50%	707	744.26	750.98	787.55	845.7	870.5
Alliance	Michael Healy	7.17%	534	543.89	665.17	744.33	773.88	779.48
SDLP	Mary Breen	7.36%	548	596.53	600.69	645.47	714.39	725.59
Sinn Féin	Geraldine Ritchie*	7.35%	547	554.36	555.32	595.88		
Workers' Party	Monica Hynds	2.87%	214	217.45	231.21			
Independent Labour	William Hampton	2.59%	193	197.14	204.82			
Electorate: 11,698 Valid: 7,446 (63.65%) Spoilt: 153 Quota: 931 Turnout: 7,599 (64.96%)

=== Newcastle ===
1985: 3 x SDLP, 1 x UUP, 1 x Sinn Féin, 1 x DUP
1989: 4 x SDLP, 2 x UUP
1985-1989 Change: SDLP and UUP gain from Sinn Féin and DUP

Newcastle - 6 seats
Party	Candidate	FPv%	Count						
Party	Candidate	FPv%	1	2	3	4	5	6	7
UUP	Gerald Douglas*	22.00%	1,329						
SDLP	Michael Boyd*	21.04%	1,271						
SDLP	Eamon O'Neill*	18.09%	1,093						
SDLP	Peter Fitzpatrick	8.97%	542	546.32	762.14	792.46	910.9		
UUP	William Brown*	6.06%	366	761.28	765.9	781.42	782.26	1,151.26	
SDLP	Cathal O'Baoill	6.11%	369	376.56	521.43	588.71	665.15	669.72	679.72
Sinn Féin	Sean Fitzpatrick	7.89%	477	477.36	491.22	511.87	534.13	534.85	534.85
DUP	John Finlay	6.89%	416	465.68	466.34	470.7	471.33		
Workers' Party	Henry Robinson	2.96%	179	183.32	199.16				
Electorate: 9,641 Valid: 6,042 (62.67%) Spoilt: 166 Quota: 864 Turnout: 6,208 (64.39%)

=== Rowallane ===
1985: 3 x UUP, 1 x DUP, 1 x SDLP
1989: 3 x UUP, 1 x DUP, 1 x SDLP
1985-1989 Change: No change

Rowallane - 5 seats
Party	Candidate	FPv%	Count				
Party	Candidate	FPv%	1	2	3	4	5
SDLP	Margaret Ritchie*	26.91%	1,509				
UUP	Samuel Osborne*	23.58%	1,322				
UUP	Albert Colmer	13.93%	781	915	1,104.9		
UUP	William Biggerstaff*	13.20%	740	892	969.4		
DUP	William Dick*	11.63%	652	678	717.3	779.1	1,013.1
Ind. Unionist	William Walker	6.26%	351	413	461.9	480.8	488.8
DUP	William Greer	4.49%	252	311	334.4	371.3	
Electorate: 8,574 Valid: 5,607 (65.40%) Spoilt: 106 Quota: 935 Turnout: 5,713 (66.63%)
