= Newcastle (District Electoral Area) =

District electoral areas in Down, Northern Ireland

Newcastle DEA (1993-2014) within Down

Newcastle was one of the four district electoral areas in Down, Northern Ireland which existed from 1985 to 2014. The district elected six members to Down District Council, and formed part of the South Down constituencies for the Northern Ireland Assembly and UK Parliament.

It was created for the 1985 local elections, replacing Down Area C which had existed since 1973, and contained the wards of Castlewellan, Donard, Dundrum, Murlough, Shimna and Tollymore. It was abolished for the 2014 local elections, with Donard, Murlough, Shimna and Tollymore moving to The Mournes DEA and Castlewellan and Dundrum moving to the Slieve Croob DEA.

== Councillors ==
Election	Councillor (party)	Councillor (party)	Councillor (party)	Councillor (party)	Councillor (party)	Councillor (party)
2011	Stephen Burns (Sinn Féin)	Willie Clarke (Sinn Féin)	Eamon O'Neill (SDLP)	Carmel O'Boyle (SDLP)	Patrick Clarke (Alliance)	Desmond Patterson (UUP)
2005	Hugh McDowell (Sinn Féin)	Willie Clarke (Sinn Féin)	Eamon O'Neill (SDLP)	Carmel O'Boyle (SDLP)	Peter Fitzpatrick (SDLP)	Gerald Douglas (UUP)
2001	Hugh McDowell (Sinn Féin)	Willie Clarke (Sinn Féin)	Eamon O'Neill (SDLP)	Carmel O'Boyle (SDLP)	Peter Fitzpatrick (SDLP)	Gerald Douglas (UUP)
1997	Hugh McDowell (Sinn Féin)	Anne Carr (NI Women's Coalition)	Eamon O'Neill (SDLP)	Carmel O'Boyle (SDLP)	Peter Fitzpatrick (SDLP)	Gerald Douglas (UUP)
1993	John Finlay (DUP)	Michael Boyd (SDLP)	Eamon O'Neill (SDLP)	Frances Flynn (SDLP)	Peter Fitzpatrick (SDLP)	Gerald Douglas (UUP)
1989	William Brown (UUP)	Michael Boyd (SDLP)	Eamon O'Neill (SDLP)	Cathal O'Baoill (SDLP)	Peter Fitzpatrick (SDLP)	Gerald Douglas (UUP)
1985	Ethel Smyth (DUP)	Michael Boyd (SDLP)	Eamon O'Neill (SDLP)	James Curry (SDLP)	Hugh McDowell (Sinn Féin)	Gerald Douglas (UUP)

== 2011 election ==
2005: 3 x SDLP, 2 x Sinn Féin, 1 x UUP

2011: 2 x SDLP, 2 x Sinn Féin, 1 x UUP, 1 x Alliance

2005-2011 change: Alliance gain from SDLP

Newcastle - 6 seats
Party	Candidate	FPv%	Count							
Party	Candidate	FPv%	1	2	3	4	5	6	7	8
Sinn Féin	Willie Clarke*	17.49%	1,171							
SDLP	Eamon O'Neill*	15.81%	1,058							
SDLP	Carmel O'Boyle*	11.47%	768	787.08	831.63	917.34	1,181.34			
Sinn Féin	Stephen Burns	11.89%	796	892.84	898.42	931.95	958.95			
UUP	Desmond Patterson	9.50%	636	636.54	637.8	655.98	663.7	676.7	1,124.7	
Alliance	Patrick Clarke	8.44%	565	570.58	575.26	665.8	702.72	746.72	773.35	936.55
Sinn Féin	Brian Morgan	6.95%	465	531.06	532.95	542.03	615.75	668.75	670.02	672.9
DUP	Stanley Priestley	7.80%	522	522.54	523.98	526.16	528.34	528.34		
SDLP	Peter Fitzpatrick*	6.02%	403	412.72	442.69	470.59				
Green (NI)	John Hardy	4.63%	310	315.76	318.55					
Electorate: 12,216 Valid: 6,694 (54.80%) Spoilt: 132 Quota: 957 Turnout: 6,826 (55.88%)

== 2005 election ==
2001: 3 x SDLP, 2 x Sinn Féin, 1 x UUP

2005: 3 x SDLP, 2 x Sinn Féin, 1 x UUP

2001-2005 change: No change

Newcastle - 6 seats
Party	Candidate	FPv%	Count					
Party	Candidate	FPv%	1	2	3	4	5	6
SDLP	Eamon O'Neill*	19.28%	1,379					
Sinn Féin	Willie Clarke*	18.19%	1,301					
SDLP	Carmel O'Boyle*	13.09%	936	1,090.18				
Sinn Féin	Hugh McDowell*	6.56%	469	479.66	656.54	679.78	682.42	1,146.42
SDLP	Peter Fitzpatrick*	8.01%	573	718.08	750.42	903.9	963.42	1,032.6
UUP	Gerald Douglas*	11.30%	808	816.32	821.82	907.04	909.68	918.76
DUP	Stanley Priestley	10.40%	744	746.86	747.08	760.56	760.8	762.56
Sinn Féin	Aíne McEvoy	7.57%	541	555.3	606.34	624.36	626.16	
Alliance	Neil Powell	3.52%	252	260.06	266.22			
Green (NI)	Peter McCarron	2.07%	148	154.76	159.16			
Electorate: 11,446 Valid: 7,151 (62.48%) Spoilt: 172 Quota: 1,022 Turnout: 7,323 (63.98%)

== 2001 election ==
1997: 3 x SDLP, 1 x Sinn Féin, 1 x UUP, 1 x Women's Coalition

2001: 3 x SDLP, 2 x Sinn Féin, 1 x UUP

1997-2001 change: Sinn Féin gain from Women's Coalition

Newcastle - 6 seats
Party	Candidate	FPv%	Count			
Party	Candidate	FPv%	1	2	3	4
SDLP	Eamon O'Neill*	16.92%	1,308			
UUP	Gerald Douglas*	15.67%	1,211			
Sinn Féin	Willie Clarke	15.05%	1,163			
SDLP	Carmel O'Boyle*	12.94%	1,000	1,087.84	1,143.84	
SDLP	Peter Fitzpatrick*	9.06%	700	774.08	824.2	1,163.2
Sinn Féin	Hugh McDowell*	12.57%	972	985.6	1,036.92	1,084.44
DUP	Stanley Priestley	8.99%	695	695.16	707.16	719.48
SDLP	Charles McGrath	5.67%	438	461.2	495.68	
Independent	David Allister	3.14%	243	246.2		
Electorate: 11,339 Valid: 7,730 (68.17%) Spoilt: 160 Quota: 1,105 Turnout: 7,890 (69.58%)

== 1997 election ==
1993: 4 x SDLP, 1 x UUP, 1 x DUP

1997: 3 x SDLP, 1 x UUP, 1 x Sinn Féin, 1 x Women's Coalition

1993-1997 change: Sinn Féin and Women's Coalition gain from SDLP and DUP

Newcastle - 6 seats
Party	Candidate	FPv%	Count								
Party	Candidate	FPv%	1	2	3	4	5	6	7	8	9
SDLP	Eamon O'Neill*	15.63%	913								
Sinn Féin	Hugh McDowell	14.22%	831	837							
UUP	Gerald Douglas*	13.23%	773	775	792	1,009					
SDLP	Carmel O'Boyle	12.24%	715	733	755	758	758.99	1,006.99			
SDLP	Peter Fitzpatrick*	12.08%	706	711	723	723	724.98	870.98			
NI Women's Coalition	Anne Carr	7.36%	430	451	532	540	565.74	605.73	672.73	748.13	779.13
DUP	Stanley Priestley	9.45%	552	552	554	588	729.57	731.56	732.56	733.08	734.08
SDLP	Frances Flynn*	7.22%	422	431	456	459	461.97				
UUP	Ronald Richey	4.43%	259	259	271						
Alliance	Adrienne Healy	2.86%	167	175							
Workers' Party	Edward O'Hagan	1.28%	75								
Electorate: 10,884 Valid: 5,843 (53.68%) Spoilt: 115 Quota: 835 Turnout: 5,958 (54.74%)

== 1993 election ==
1989: 4 x SDLP, 2 x UUP

1993: 4 x SDLP, 1 x UUP, 1 x DUP

1989-1993 change: DUP gain from UUP

Newcastle - 6 seats
Party	Candidate	FPv%	Count						
Party	Candidate	FPv%	1	2	3	4	5	6	7
SDLP	Michael Boyd*	21.83%	1,405						
SDLP	Eamon O'Neill*	17.87%	1,150						
UUP	Gerald Douglas*	14.73%	948						
SDLP	Peter Fitzpatrick*	10.36%	667	723	724.98	870.98			
SDLP	Frances Flynn	6.39%	411	631.68	706.86	753.66	760.66	920.9	
DUP	John Finlay	6.68%	430	432.16	432.79	432.79	682.79	684.42	700.95
Alliance	Anne Carr	8.20%	528	571.92	580.53	582.13	637.68	676.05	681.93
Sinn Féin	Sean Fitzpatrick	7.78%	501	521.52	544.62	547.72	547.72		
UUP	William Brown*	6.15%	396	401.04	401.67	401.77			
Electorate: 10,170 Valid: 6,436 (63.28%) Spoilt: 182 Quota: 920 Turnout: 6,618 (65.07%)

== 1989 election ==
1985: 3 x SDLP, 1 x UUP, 1 x Sinn Féin, 1 x DUP

1989: 4 x SDLP, 2 x UUP

1985-1989 change: SDLP and UUP gain from Sinn Féin and DUP

Newcastle - 6 seats
Party	Candidate	FPv%	Count						
Party	Candidate	FPv%	1	2	3	4	5	6	7
UUP	Gerald Douglas*	22.00%	1,329						
SDLP	Michael Boyd*	21.04%	1,271						
SDLP	Eamon O'Neill*	18.09%	1,093						
SDLP	Peter Fitzpatrick	8.97%	542	546.32	762.14	792.46	910.9		
UUP	William Brown*	6.06%	366	761.28	765.9	781.42	782.26	1,151.26	
SDLP	Cathal O'Baoill	6.11%	369	376.56	521.43	588.71	665.15	669.72	679.72
Sinn Féin	Sean Fitzpatrick	7.89%	477	477.36	491.22	511.87	534.13	534.85	534.85
DUP	John Finlay	6.89%	416	465.68	466.34	470.7	471.33		
Workers' Party	Henry Robinson	2.96%	179	183.32	199.16				
Electorate: 9,641 Valid: 6,042 (62.67%) Spoilt: 166 Quota: 864 Turnout: 6,208 (64.39%)

== 1985 election ==
1985: 3 x SDLP, 1 x UUP, 1 x Sinn Féin, 1 x DUP

Newcastle - 6 seats
Party	Candidate	FPv%	Count					
Party	Candidate	FPv%	1	2	3	4	5	6
UUP	Gerald Douglas*	22.06%	1,350					
Sinn Féin	Hugh McDowell	13.97%	855					
DUP	Ethel Smyth*	11.99%	734	1,117.75				
SDLP	Eamon O'Neill*	13.51%	827	829.52	832.08	924.08		
SDLP	Michael Boyd	13.43%	822	825.24	827.16	890.16		
SDLP	James Curry*	7.25%	444	446.16	448.4	487.4	516.51	843.1
Alliance	Anthony Dickinson	5.33%	326	396.92	625.36	672.04	677.01	690.15
SDLP	Peter Fitzpatrick	6.62%	405	405.72	406.36	426.72	441.53	
Workers' Party	Edward O'Hagan	4.17%	255	257.52	259.76			
Workers' Party	Sean Magee	1.67%	102	103.44	103.76			
Electorate: 8,978 Valid: 6,120 (68.17%) Spoilt: 135 Quota: 875 Turnout: 6,255 (69.67%)
