= Ballynahinch (District Electoral Area) =

District electoral areas in Down, Northern Ireland

Ballynahinch DEA (1993-2014) within Down

Ballynahinch was one of the four district electoral areas in Down, Northern Ireland which existed from 1985 to 2014. The district elected five members to Down District Council, and formed part of the Strangford constituencies for the Northern Ireland Assembly and UK Parliament and part of the South Down constituencies for the Northern Ireland Assembly and UK Parliament.

It was created for the 1985 local elections, replacing parts of Down Area A and Down Area C which had existed since 1973, and contained the wards of Ballynaglave, Ballynahinch East, Drumaness, Dunmore and Seaforde. It was abolished for the 2014 local elections with Ballynahinch moving to the Rowallane DEA and most of the DEA moving to the new Slieve Croob DEA.

== Councillors ==
| Election | Councillor (Party) | Councillor (Party) | Councillor (Party) | Councillor (Party) | Councillor (Party) |
|---|---|---|---|---|---|
| 2011 | Patrick Toman (SDLP) | Anne Marie McAleenan (SDLP) | Michael Coogan (Sinn Féin) | Walter Lyons (UUP) | Garth Craig (DUP) |
| 2005 | Patrick Toman (SDLP) | Anne Marie McAleenan (SDLP) | Michael Coogan (Sinn Féin) | Peter Bowles (UUP) | Jim Wells (DUP) |
| 2001 | Patrick Toman (SDLP) | Anne Marie McAleenan (SDLP) | Francis Branniff (Sinn Féin) | Harvey Bicker (UUP) | Jim Wells (DUP) |
| 1997 | Patrick Toman (SDLP) | Anne Marie McAleenan (SDLP) | Francis Casement (SDLP) | Harvey Bicker (UUP) | William Alexander (DUP) |
| 1993 | Patrick Toman (SDLP) | Anne Marie McAleenan (SDLP) | Walter Lyons (UUP) | James Cochrane (UUP) | William Alexander (DUP) |
| 1989 | Patrick Toman (SDLP) | James Magee (SDLP) | Walter Lyons (UUP) | James Cochrane (UUP) | Thomas Poole (DUP) |
| 1985 | Francis Laverty (SDLP) | James Magee (SDLP) | William Brown (UUP) | James Cochrane (UUP) | Thomas Poole (DUP) |

== 2011 Election ==
2005: 2 x SDLP, 1 x DUP, 1 x Sinn Féin, 1 x UUP

2011: 2 x SDLP, 1 x DUP, 1 x Sinn Féin, 1 x UUP

2005-2011 Change: No change

Ballynahinch - 5 seats
| Party | Candidate | FPv% | Count | | | | | |
| Party | Candidate | FPv% | 1 | 2 | 3 | 4 | 5 | 6 |
|---|---|---|---|---|---|---|---|---|
| DUP | Garth Craig | 21.32% | 1,260 | | | | | |
| Sinn Féin | Michael Coogan* | 20.41% | 1,206 | | | | | |
| UUP | Walter Lyons | 14.26% | 843 | 898.88 | 899.57 | 908.02 | 971.91 | 1,145.91 |
| SDLP | Anne Marie McAleenan* | 12.52% | 740 | 742.42 | 833.27 | 878.49 | 944.17 | 979.17 |
| SDLP | Patrick Toman* | 14.01% | 828 | 830.42 | 883.09 | 913.38 | 943.13 | 967.67 |
| Independent | Mark Murnin | 6.24% | 369 | 372.74 | 415.75 | 451.12 | 507.09 | 549.01 |
| DUP | Yvonne Moore | 4.65% | 275 | 478.28 | 478.97 | 485.97 | 504.19 | |
| Alliance | Andy Corkhill | 3.60% | 213 | 215.2 | 225.55 | 269.16 | | |
| Green (NI) | Mark McCormick | 2.98% | 176 | 176.88 | 195.74 | | | |
Electorate: 10,680 Valid: 5,910 (55.34%) Spoilt: 116 Quota: 986 Turnout: 6,026 (56.42%)

== 2005 Election ==
2001: 2 x SDLP, 1 x DUP, 1 x Sinn Féin, 1 x UUP

2005: 2 x SDLP, 1 x DUP, 1 x Sinn Féin, 1 x UUP

2001-2005 Change: No change

Ballynahinch - 5 seats
| Party | Candidate | FPv% | Count | | | | | |
| Party | Candidate | FPv% | 1 | 2 | 3 | 4 | 5 | 6 |
|---|---|---|---|---|---|---|---|---|
| DUP | Jim Wells* | 20.85% | 1,305 | | | | | |
| Sinn Féin | Michael Coogan | 19.94% | 1,248 | | | | | |
| UUP | Peter Bowles | 12.90% | 807 | 845 | 847.07 | 1,211.07 | | |
| SDLP | Anne Marie McAleenan* | 11.92% | 746 | 748.6 | 832.55 | 838.98 | 854.91 | 1,188.91 |
| SDLP | Patrick Toman* | 14.01% | 877 | 877.8 | 934.84 | 942.5 | 956.66 | 1,055.23 |
| DUP | Samuel Hanna | 5.99% | 375 | 554 | 554 | 624.8 | 735.72 | 749.85 |
| SDLP | Francis Casement | 7.38% | 462 | 463 | 517.51 | 524.14 | 548.92 | |
| UUP | Walter Lyons | 7.00% | 438 | 471 | 472.61 | | | |
Electorate: 9,963 Valid: 6,258 (62.81%) Spoilt: 106 Quota: 1,044 Turnout: 6,364 (63.88%)

== 2001 Election ==
1997: 3 x SDLP, 1 x UUP, 1 x DUP

2001: 2 x SDLP, 1 x UUP, 1 x DUP, 1 x Sinn Féin

1997-2001 Change: Sinn Féin gain from SDLP

Ballynahinch - 5 seats
| Party | Candidate | FPv% | Count | | | | | |
| Party | Candidate | FPv% | 1 | 2 | 3 | 4 | 5 | 6 |
|---|---|---|---|---|---|---|---|---|
| SDLP | Patrick Toman* | 16.74% | 1,150 | | | | | |
| SDLP | Anne Marie McAleenan* | 14.01% | 962 | 965 | 1,456 | | | |
| DUP | Jim Wells | 12.55% | 862 | 951 | 956 | 961 | 1,358 | |
| Sinn Féin | Francis Branniff | 13.64% | 937 | 937 | 985 | 1,123 | 1,125 | 1,125.85 |
| UUP | Harvey Bicker* | 11.50% | 790 | 839 | 855 | 902 | 1,022 | 1,125.7 |
| UUP | John Cochrane | 9.81% | 674 | 778 | 789 | 817 | 911 | 1,018.95 |
| DUP | William Alexander* | 8.63% | 593 | 640 | 644 | 649 | | |
| SDLP | Francis Casement* | 8.62% | 592 | 598 | | | | |
| UUP | John Reid | 2.65% | 182 | | | | | |
| DUP | Alan McIlroy | 1.83% | 126 | | | | | |
Electorate: 9,997 Valid: 6,868 (68.70%) Spoilt: 137 Quota: 1,145 Turnout: 7,005 (70.07%)

== 1997 Election ==
1993: 2 x SDLP, 2 x UUP, 1 x DUP

1997: 3 x SDLP, 1 x UUP, 1 x DUP

1993-1997 Change: SDLP gain from UUP

Ballynahinch - 5 seats
| Party | Candidate | FPv% | Count | | | | | |
| Party | Candidate | FPv% | 1 | 2 | 3 | 4 | 5 | 6 |
|---|---|---|---|---|---|---|---|---|
| DUP | William Alexander* | 24.91% | 1,362 | | | | | |
| SDLP | Patrick Toman* | 21.89% | 1,197 | | | | | |
| UUP | Harvey Bicker | 18.11% | 990 | | | | | |
| SDLP | Anne Marie McAleenan* | 17.39% | 951 | | | | | |
| SDLP | Francis Casement | 7.48% | 409 | 413.2 | 672.64 | 821.91 | 823.11 | 856.51 |
| UUP | John Reid | 5.94% | 325 | 769.5 | 772.62 | 776.86 | 851.5 | 852.06 |
| Sinn Féin | John Smyth | 4.28% | 234 | 234.7 | 249.58 | | | |
Electorate: 9,536 Valid: 5,468 (57.34%) Spoilt: 110 Quota: 912 Turnout: 5,578 (58.49%)

== 1993 Election ==
1989: 2 x SDLP, 2 x UUP, 1 x DUP

1993: 2 x SDLP, 2 x UUP, 1 x DUP

1989-1993 Change: No change

Ballynahinch - 5 seats
| Party | Candidate | FPv% | Count | | |
| Party | Candidate | FPv% | 1 | 2 | 3 |
|---|---|---|---|---|---|
| SDLP | Patrick Toman* | 25.41% | 1,480 | | |
| SDLP | Anne Marie McAleenan | 23.97% | 1,396 | | |
| DUP | William Alexander | 19.81% | 1,154 | | |
| UUP | James Cochrane* | 16.12% | 939 | 1,025 | |
| UUP | Walter Lyons* | 8.38% | 488 | 648 | 867 |
| UUP | Janet Crothers | 6.32% | 368 | 450 | 583 |
Electorate: 8,953 Valid: 5,825 (65.06%) Spoilt: 132 Quota: 971 Turnout: 5,957 (66.54%)

== 1989 Election ==
1985: 2 x SDLP, 2 x UUP, 1 x DUP

1989: 2 x SDLP, 2 x UUP, 1 x DUP

1985-1989 Change: No change

Ballynahinch - 5 seats
| Party | Candidate | FPv% | Count | | | | |
| Party | Candidate | FPv% | 1 | 2 | 3 | 4 | 5 |
|---|---|---|---|---|---|---|---|
| SDLP | Patrick Toman | 21.33% | 1,222 | | | | |
| UUP | James Cochrane* | 21.01% | 1,204 | | | | |
| SDLP | James Magee* | 17.19% | 985 | | | | |
| UUP | Walter Lyons | 15.08% | 864 | 865.54 | 1,053.91 | | |
| DUP | Thomas Poole* | 13.79% | 790 | 791.98 | 848.47 | 935.26 | 967.26 |
| SDLP | Patrick King | 6.77% | 388 | 630.88 | 631.51 | 632.17 | 750.17 |
| Sinn Féin | Patrick McGreevy | 2.97% | 170 | 180.12 | 180.12 | 180.34 | |
| Green (NI) | Philip Allen | 1.87% | 107 | 109.2 | 111.51 | 115.8 | |
Electorate: 8,529 Valid: 5,730 (67.18%) Spoilt: 126 Quota: 956 Turnout: 5,856 (68.66%)

== 1985 Election ==
1985: 2 x SDLP, 2 x UUP, 1 x DUP

Ballynahinch - 5 seats
| Party | Candidate | FPv% | Count | | | | |
| Party | Candidate | FPv% | 1 | 2 | 3 | 4 | 5 |
|---|---|---|---|---|---|---|---|
| SDLP | James Magee* | 19.00% | 1,020 | | | | |
| UUP | William Brown* | 18.70% | 1,004 | | | | |
| DUP | Thomas Poole* | 13.82% | 742 | 742.24 | 971.24 | | |
| UUP | James Cochrane | 14.57% | 782 | 782 | 822 | 928 | |
| SDLP | Francis Laverty* | 10.36% | 556 | 630.52 | 630.64 | 788.12 | 879.32 |
| SDLP | Patrick Savage | 11.10% | 596 | 635 | 635 | 711.48 | 728.76 |
| Alliance | Patrick Forde* | 7.38% | 396 | 403.44 | 405.44 | | |
| DUP | Stanley Priestley | 5.08% | 273 | 273.12 | | | |
Electorate: 7,947 Valid: 5,369 (67.56%) Spoilt: 111 Quota: 895 Turnout: 5,480 (68.96%)
