= Downpatrick (District Electoral Area) =

District electoral area in Northern Ireland

- Newry, Mourne and Down District Council DEA constituency

Current constituency
- Created: 1985
- Seats: 7 (1985–2014); 5 (2014–present)
- Councillors: Philip Campbell (SF); Cadogan Enright (IND); Conor Galbraith (SDLP); Oonagh Hanlon (SF); Gareth Sharvin (SDLP)

Downpatrick DEA within Newry, Mourne and Down

Downpatrick DEA (1993-2014) within Down

Downpatrick is one of the seven district electoral areas (DEA) in Newry, Mourne and Down, Northern Ireland. The district elects five members to Newry, Mourne and Down District Council and contains the wards of Cathedral, Knocknashinna, Lecale, Quoile and Strangford. Downpatrick forms part of the South Down constituencies for the Northern Ireland Assembly and UK Parliament.

It was created for the 1985 local elections, replacing Down Area B which had existed since 1973, where it contained seven wards (Ardglass, Audleys Acre, Cathedral, Flying Horse, Killough, Quoile and Strangford). For the 2014 local elections it was reduced to five wards.

== Councillors ==
Election	Councillor (Party)	Councillor (Party)	Councillor (Party)	Councillor (Party)	Councillor (Party)	Councillor (Party)	Councillor (Party)
September 2025 Co-Option	Cadogan Enright (Independent)/ (Alliance)/ (Green Party)	Conor Galbraith (SDLP)	Aurla King (SDLP)	Philip Campbell (Sinn Féin)	Oonagh Hanlon (Sinn Féin)	5 seats 2014–present	5 seats 2014–present
July 2025 Defection	Cadogan Enright (Independent)/ (Alliance)/ (Green Party)	Conor Galbraith (SDLP)	Gareth Sharvin (SDLP)	Philip Campbell (Sinn Féin)	Oonagh Hanlon (Sinn Féin)	5 seats 2014–present	5 seats 2014–present
2023	Cadogan Enright (Independent)/ (Alliance)/ (Green Party)	Conor Galbraith (SDLP)	Gareth Sharvin (SDLP)	Philip Campbell (Sinn Féin)	Oonagh Hanlon (Sinn Féin)	5 seats 2014–present	5 seats 2014–present
July 2022 Defection	Cadogan Enright (Independent)/ (Alliance)/ (Green Party)	Dermot Curran (SDLP)	Gareth Sharvin (SDLP)	John Trainor (SDLP)	Oonagh Hanlon (Sinn Féin)	5 seats 2014–present	5 seats 2014–present
2019	Cadogan Enright (Independent)/ (Alliance)/ (Green Party)	Dermot Curran (SDLP)	Gareth Sharvin (SDLP)	John Trainor (SDLP)	Oonagh Hanlon (Sinn Féin)	5 seats 2014–present	5 seats 2014–present
May 2016 Co-Option	Cadogan Enright (Independent)/ (Alliance)/ (Green Party)	Dermot Curran (SDLP)	Gareth Sharvin (SDLP)	John Trainor (SDLP)	Naomi Bailie (Sinn Féin)	5 seats 2014–present	5 seats 2014–present
2014	Cadogan Enright (Independent)/ (Alliance)/ (Green Party)	Dermot Curran (SDLP)	Gareth Sharvin (SDLP)	Colin McGrath (SDLP)	Naomi Bailie (Sinn Féin)	5 seats 2014–present	5 seats 2014–present
2011	Cadogan Enright (Independent)/ (Alliance)/ (Green Party)	Dermot Curran (SDLP)	Peter Craig (SDLP)	Colin McGrath (SDLP)	John Doris (SDLP)	Liam Johnston (Sinn Féin)	Éamonn McConvey (Sinn Féin)
December 2005 Co-Option	Cadogan Enright (Independent)/ (Alliance)/ (Green Party)	Dermot Curran (SDLP)	Peter Craig (SDLP)	Colin McGrath (SDLP)	John Doris (SDLP)	Liam Johnston (Sinn Féin)	Éamonn McConvey (Sinn Féin)
2005	Bill Corry (Green Party)	Dermot Curran (SDLP)	Peter Craig (SDLP)	Colin McGrath (SDLP)	John Doris (SDLP)	Liam Johnston (Sinn Féin)	Éamonn McConvey (Sinn Féin)
2001	Jack McIlheron (UUP)	Dermot Curran (SDLP)	Peter Craig (SDLP)	Ann Trainor (SDLP)	John Doris (SDLP)	Raymond Blaney (Independent)	Éamonn McConvey (Sinn Féin)
1997	Jack McIlheron (UUP)	Dermot Curran (SDLP)	Owen Adams (SDLP)	Gerard Mahon (SDLP)	John Doris (SDLP)	Patrick McGreevy (Sinn Féin)	Éamonn McConvey (Sinn Féin)
1993	Jack McIlheron (UUP)	Dermot Curran (SDLP)	Owen Adams (SDLP)	John Ritchie (SDLP)	John Doris (SDLP)	Malachi Curran (SDLP)	Francis McCann (SDLP)
1989	Samuel McCartney (UUP)	Dermot Curran (SDLP)	Sean Quinn (SDLP)	John Ritchie (SDLP)	John Doris (SDLP)	Malachi Curran (SDLP)	Michael Healy (Alliance)
1985	Samuel McCartney (UUP)	Eddie McGrady (SDLP)	Sean Quinn (SDLP)	John Ritchie (SDLP)	Geraldine Ritchie (Sinn Féin)	Malachi Curran (SDLP)	Raymond Blaney (Workers' Party)

== 2023 Election ==
2019: 3 x SDLP, 1 x Sinn Féin, 1 x Independent

2023: 2 x Sinn Féin, 2 x SDLP, 1 x Alliance

2019–2023 Change: Sinn Féin and Alliance gain from SDLP and Independent

Downpatrick - 5 seats
Party	Candidate	FPv%	Count									
Party	Candidate	FPv%	1	2	3	4	5	6	7	8	9	10
Sinn Féin	Oonagh Hanlon*	19.32%	1,579									
SDLP	Gareth Sharvin* †	15.99%	1,307	1,325.59	1,348.72	1,360.98	1,388.78					
Alliance	Cadogan Enright* ‡	13.75%	1,124	1,131.67	1,172.67	1,209.67	1,334.80	1,377.80				
Sinn Féin	Philip Campbell	14.19%	1,160	1,262.70	1,266.70	1,268.70	1,271.70	1,377.70				
SDLP	Conor Galbraith	7.22%	590	597.41	608.41	617.41	641.41	705.06	711.06	718.34	721.23	1,166.23
Sinn Féin	Louise Rooney	9.94%	812	866.08	877.21	877.47	877.60	946.11	946.11	950.03	959.38	1,057.38
SDLP	Aurla King	7.50%	613	620.67	629.67	643.67	666.67	705.80	712.80	716.16	717.86	
Independent	Éamon Mac Con Midhe	4.94%	404	409.46	415.72	418.72	435.72					
DUP	Sharon Harvey	3.27%	267	267.26	268.26	388.26						
UUP	Alexander Burgess	2.45%	200	200.52	201.52							
Green (NI)	Declan Walsh	1.43%	117	117.65								
Electorate: 15,691 Valid: 8,173 (52.09%) Spoilt: 113 Quota: 1,363 Turnout: 8,286 (52.81%)

== 2019 Election ==
2014: 3 x SDLP, 1 x Sinn Féin, 1 x Independent

2019: 3 x SDLP, 1 x Sinn Féin, 1 x Independent

2014-2019 Change: No change

Downpatrick - 5 seats
Party	Candidate	FPv%	Count						
Party	Candidate	FPv%	1	2	3	4	5	6	7
SDLP	Gareth Sharvin*	19.01%	1,395						
Independent	Cadogan Enright* ‡	14.34%	1,052	1,093.36	1,216.46	1,327.46			
SDLP	Dermot Curran*	12.81%	940	969.59	976.59	1,059.02	1,222.24	1,317.24	
Sinn Féin	Oonagh Hanlon	14.06%	1,032	1,041.13	1,049.13	1,073.46	1,073.46	1,156.68	1,157.68
SDLP	John Trainor*	9.05%	664	744.74	758.18	852.83	906.27	1,060.81	1,094.81
Sinn Féin	Jordan Madden	11.35%	833	846.31	853.31	864.53	865.43	899.3	899.3
Aontú	Macartán Digney	6.47%	475	478.19	486.19	517.74	524.74		
UUP	Alex Burgess	4.70%	345	345.66	479.66	508.66			
Alliance	Tiernan Laird	5.11%	375	380.5	434.05				
DUP	James Savage	2.03%	149	149					
Green (NI)	Jamie Kennedy	1.74%	128	129.32					
Electorate: 14,620 Valid: 7,388 (50.19%) Spoilt: 86 Quota: 1,232 Turnout: 7,474 (51.12%)

== 2014 Election ==
2011: 4 x SDLP, 2 x Sinn Féin, 1 x Green

2014: 3 x SDLP, 1 x Sinn Féin, 1 x Independent

2011-2014 Change: SDLP and Sinn Féin loss due to the reduction of two seats, Independent leaves Greens

Downpatrick - 5 seats
Party	Candidate	FPv%	Count			
Party	Candidate	FPv%	1	2	3	4
SDLP	Colin McGrath* †	19.63%	1,279			
SDLP	Dermot Curran*	16.52%	1,076	1,226		
SDLP	Gareth Sharvin*	14.75%	961	1,034	1,170.35	
Independent	Cadogan Enright*	12.88%	839	978	997.05	1,052.05
Sinn Féin	Naomi Bailie	15.83%	1,031	1,032	1,045.35	1,049.35
Sinn Féin	Eamonn McConvey*	12.45%	811	812	829.4	833.4
UUP	Graham Furey	5.73%	373			
DUP	Yvonne Moore	2.21%	144			
Electorate: 14,000 Valid: 6,514 (46.53%) Spoilt: 98 Quota: 1,086 Turnout: 6,612 (47.23%)

== 2011 Election ==
2005: 4 x SDLP, 2 x Sinn Féin, 1 x Green

2011: 4 x SDLP, 2 x Sinn Féin, 1 x Green

2005-2011 Change: No change

Downpatrick - 7 seats
Party	Candidate	FPv%	Count							
Party	Candidate	FPv%	1	2	3	4	5	6	7	8
SDLP	Colin McGrath*	16.64%	1,144							
SDLP	Dermot Curran*	14.53%	999							
SDLP	Peter Craig*	12.74%	876							
Sinn Féin	Éamonn McConvey*	12.10%	832	850.25	850.5	859.95	1,019.95			
Sinn Féin	Liam Johnston*	9.81%	674	688.75	690.75	697.05	817.6	955.6		
SDLP	John Doris*	8.82%	606	718.75	724	799.15	812.5	814.5	830.5	900.5
Green (NI)	Cadogan Enright	7.99%	549	577.25	589.25	601.55	627.15	632.15	647.15	821.1
SDLP	Gareth Sharvin	4.66%	320	407.25	418.5	440.4	484.65	492.65	506.65	552.05
UUP	Annette Holden	4.80%	330	331.25	463.25	465.35	465.35	465.35	465.35	
Sinn Féin	Martin Rice	5.47%	376	379.75	380.75	390.65				
DUP	Andrew Steenson	2.44%	168	175						
Electorate: 13,640 Valid: 6,874 (50.40%) Spoilt: 163 Quota: 860 Turnout: 7,037 (51.59%)

== 2005 Election ==
2001: 4 x SDLP, 1 x Sinn Féin, 1 x UUP, 1 x Independent

2005: 4 x SDLP, 2 x Sinn Féin, 1 x Green

2001-2005 Change: Sinn Féin and Green gain from UUP and Independent

Downpatrick - 7 seats
Party	Candidate	FPv%	Count							
Party	Candidate	FPv%	1	2	3	4	5	6	7	8
Sinn Féin	Éamonn McConvey*	16.43%	1,259							
SDLP	Peter Craig*	13.83%	1,060							
SDLP	Dermot Curran*	12.25%	939	965.64						
SDLP	John Doris*	11.29%	865	876.28	884.52	976.52				
SDLP	Colin McGrath	8.14%	624	633.84	644.84	890.76	964.13			
Sinn Féin	Liam Johnston	9.42%	722	837.68	840.68	855.12	866.56	870.24	1,290.24	
Green (NI)	Bill Corry	7.37%	565	570.28	597	624.48	632.95	643.07	691.34	780.34
UUP	William Murphy	8.48%	650	651.92	659.16	667.64	670.06	671.44	679.87	686.87
Sinn Féin	Caitríona Mackel	6.30%	483	596.04	602.52	612.72	615.69	617.99		
SDLP	Daniel McEvoy	5.22%	400	406.72	418.2					
Workers' Party	Desmond O'Hagan	1.27%	97	99.4						
Electorate: 12,695 Valid: 7,664 (60.37%) Spoilt: 169 Quota: 959 Turnout: 7,833 (61.70%)

== 2001 Election ==
1997: 5 x SDLP, 1 x Sinn Féin, 1 x UUP

2001: 4 x SDLP, 1 x Sinn Féin, 1 x UUP, 1 x Independent

1997-2001 Change: Independent gain from SDLP

Downpatrick - 7 seats
Party	Candidate	FPv%	Count								
Party	Candidate	FPv%	1	2	3	4	5	6	7	8	9
Sinn Féin	Éamonn McConvey	13.61%	1,147								
SDLP	Peter Craig*	12.78%	1,077								
SDLP	Dermot Curran*	12.15%	1,024	1,028.64	1,041.54	1,060.54					
SDLP	John Doris*	10.11%	852	854.96	858.04	865.14	882.14	915.32	915.32	1,178.32	
SDLP	Ann Trainor	10.07%	849	853.8	855.06	861.1	876.12	890.22	891.22	1,118.22	
Independent	Raymond Blaney	9.91%	835	838.44	839.68	868.78	895.78	947.88	961.88	1,025.6	1,051.84
UUP	Jack McIlheron*	9.28%	782	782.32	782.44	791.52	805.52	809.52	962.6	970.84	976.58
Sinn Féin	Liam Johnston	7.51%	633	697.88	698.54	701.54	707.54	742.02	744.04	787.36	800.07
SDLP	Gerard Mahon*	4.79%	404	405.36	405.84	409.84	414.92	420.92	420.92		
SDLP	John Irvine	2.76%	233	234.92	235.42	236.44	241.52	252.76	252.76		
DUP	John Foster	2.41%	203	203.08	203.12	203.12	203.12	203.12			
Independent	Patrick O'Connor	2.05%	173	174.28	174.34	186.36	192.44				
Workers' Party	Desmond O'Hagan	1.36%	115	115.24	115.26	117.28					
Independent	Helen Honeyman	1.20%	101	101.08	101.38						
Electorate: 13,109 Valid: 8,428 (64.29%) Spoilt: 238 Quota: 1,054 Turnout: 8,666 (66.11%)

== 1997 Election ==
1993: 6 x SDLP, 1 x UUP

1997: 5 x SDLP, 1 x Sinn Féin, 1 x UUP

1993-1997 Change: Sinn Féin gain from SDLP

Downpatrick - 7 seats
Party	Candidate	FPv%	Count								
Party	Candidate	FPv%	1	2	3	4	5	6	7	8	9
SDLP	John Doris*	16.17%	991								
SDLP	Peter Craig	14.98%	918								
UUP	Jack McIlheron*	13.09%	802								
SDLP	Dermot Curran*	12.20%	748	841.15							
SDLP	Owen Adams*	7.78%	477	534.5	580.91	622.71	623.31	626.13	657.29	764.52	806.52
Sinn Féin	Patrick McGreevy	10.75%	659	664.29	668.88	670.4	670.4	674.1	700.09	712.23	757.15
SDLP	Gerard Mahon	6.80%	417	431.03	455.17	465.24	465.78	469.03	476.89	623.69	654.46
Alliance	Michael Healy	7.03%	431	437.44	444.41	448.02	472.62	476.25	536.88	542.1	594.88
Labour Coalition	Patrick O'Connor	4.10%	251	253.53	255.23	255.99	256.83	269.39	323.38	329.61	
SDLP	John Irvine	3.08%	189	225.34	277.87	291.36	291.66	293.29	307.26		
Green (NI)	Keith Bradford	1.84%	113	116.45	118.49	119.82	122.76	123.22			
Workers' Party	Desmond O'Hagan	0.93%	57	57.92	59.28	59.47	59.65	59.88			
Labour Coalition	Edna Furey	0.67%	41	41.92	43.62	44.19	47.49	53.72			
Labour Coalition	Michael Kearney	0.57%	35	37.53	43.14	43.71	44.07				
Electorate: 12,631 Valid: 6,129 (48.52%) Spoilt: 80 Quota: 767 Turnout: 6,209 (49.16%)

== 1993 Election ==
1989: 5 x SDLP, 1 x UUP, 1 x Alliance

1993: 6 x SDLP, 1 x UUP

1989-1993 Change: SDLP gain from Alliance

Downpatrick - 7 seats
Party	Candidate	FPv%	Count										
Party	Candidate	FPv%	1	2	3	4	5	6	7	8	9	10	11
SDLP	Dermot Curran*	14.30%	1,075										
SDLP	John Doris*	13.79%	1,037										
SDLP	John Ritchie*	13.71%	1,031										
UUP	Jack McIlheron	13.37%	1,005										
SDLP	Malachi Curran*	9.63%	724	800.18	829.28	858.26	859.69	874.21	912.37	957.37			
SDLP	Francis McCann	7.57%	569	582	625.4	643.4	643.62	657.8	662.06	694.44	729.72	781.35	787.83
SDLP	Owen Adams	6.33%	476	489.52	506.72	539.39	540.27	543.56	552.95	585.08	634.5	714.13	724.39
Alliance	Michael Healy*	5.89%	443	447.55	449.75	452.09	488.94	516.91	534.34	544.6	592.25	720.56	721.1
Independent	Keith Bradford	3.87%	291	293.47	295.87	298.39	312.69	340.4	351.17	383.5	409.54		
Independent	Patrick O'Connor	3.14%	236	244.45	244.55	245.18	249.14	258.32	340.86	365.35			
Sinn Féin	Patrick McGreevy	4.18%	314	316.6	317.6	318.32	318.54	324.82	328.21				
Independent	James Masson	2.22%	167	175.84	176.14	176.23	178.87	180.87					
Workers' Party	Desmond O'Hagan	2.01%	151	151.65	152.65	154	155.87						
Electorate: 12,290 Valid: 7,519 (61.18%) Spoilt: 150 Quota: 940 Turnout: 7,669 (62.40%)

== 1989 Election ==
1985: 4 x SDLP, 1 x UUP, 1 x Sinn Féin, 1 x Workers' Party

1989: 5 x SDLP, 1 x UUP, 1 x Alliance

1985-1989 Change: SDLP and Alliance gain from Sinn Féin and Workers' Party

Downpatrick - 7 seats
Party	Candidate	FPv%	Count					
Party	Candidate	FPv%	1	2	3	4	5	6
SDLP	Dermot Curran*	16.09%	1,198					
UUP	Samuel McCartney*	14.91%	1,110					
SDLP	John Ritchie*	11.93%	888	918.59	927.23	959.23		
SDLP	Sean Quinn*	10.64%	792	823.74	832.38	892.86	983.86	
SDLP	Malachi Curran	9.60%	715	803.55	807.39	854.04	926.81	938.01
SDLP	John Doris	9.50%	707	744.26	750.98	787.55	845.7	870.5
Alliance	Michael Healy	7.17%	534	543.89	665.17	744.33	773.88	779.48
SDLP	Mary Breen	7.36%	548	596.53	600.69	645.47	714.39	725.59
Sinn Féin	Geraldine Ritchie*	7.35%	547	554.36	555.32	595.88		
Workers' Party	Monica Hynds	2.87%	214	217.45	231.21			
Independent Labour	William Hampton	2.59%	193	197.14	204.82			
Electorate: 11,698 Valid: 7,446 (63.65%) Spoilt: 153 Quota: 931 Turnout: 7,599 (64.96%)

== 1985 Election ==
1985: 4 x SDLP, 1 x UUP, 1 x Sinn Féin, 1 x Workers' Party

Downpatrick - 7 seats
Party	Candidate	FPv%	Count								
Party	Candidate	FPv%	1	2	3	4	5	6	7	8	9
SDLP	Eddie McGrady*	26.92%	1,886								
UUP	Samuel McCartney	16.28%	1,141								
SDLP	Dermot Curran*	11.50%	806	963.68							
SDLP	Sean Quinn	8.26%	579	976.44							
SDLP	John Ritchie*	6.62%	464	686.48	692.72	696.34	755.7	797.94	803.1	1,008.1	
Sinn Féin	Geraldine Ritchie	9.90%	694	740.44	740.83	750.22	757.22	761.84	762.84	805.15	820.15
Workers' Party	Raymond Blaney*	7.91%	554	616.1	625.85	685.18	693.86	700.46	710.85	763.26	797.26
Alliance	Michael Healy	4.40%	308	324.74	406.64	410.89	412.71	414.69	702.8	748.39	782.39
SDLP	Madge McAvoy	4.08%	286	375.1	377.83	382.91	403.77	434.13	443.45		
Alliance	Margaret Donnelly	2.95%	207	212.94	373.23	375.31	376.43	377.09			
Workers' Party	Alan McCullough	2.95%	82	89.56	93.07						
Electorate: 10,997 Valid: 7,007 (63.72%) Spoilt: 159 Quota: 876 Turnout: 7,166 (65.16%)
