= Harvey Bicker =

Northern Irish politician

Member of the President of Ireland's Council of State
- In office 2005–2012

Member of Down District Council
- In office 21 May 1997 – 5 May 2005
- Preceded by: James Cochrane
- Succeeded by: Peter Bowles
- Constituency: Ballynahinch

Personal details
- Born: Lisburn, Northern Ireland
- Party: Fianna Fáil (2004–present); Ulster Unionist Party (1997–2004)
- Profession: Military Officer

Col. Reginald Harvey Bicker OBE TD is a Northern Irish businessman and Fianna Fáil politician from Spa, County Down, though he is originally from Lisburn.

== Background ==
He was a member of the President of Ireland's Council of State from 2005 to 2012. Bicker was formerly a councillor serving on Down District Council as a member of the Ulster Unionist Party (UUP) from 1997 to 2004. Peter Bowles was co-opted as the UUP's replacement on the council following Bicker's appointment as Chairman of the Mourne National Park Working Party by Angela Smith. He is noted for being the first former Ulster unionist politician to affiliate with an Irish republican party after Fianna Fáil announced their intentions to organise on an All-Ireland basis.

Bicker is a retired colonel in the British Army, having served in the Royal Irish Regiment and the Ulster Defence Regiment. He is a member of the Military Heritage of Ireland Trust.
