= Dermot Nesbitt =

Northern Irish unionist politician

Minister of the Environment
- In office 20 February 2002 – 15 October 2002
- Preceded by: Sam Foster
- Succeeded by: Arlene Foster

Member of the Legislative Assembly for South Down
- In office 25 June 1998 – 7 March 2007
- Preceded by: Constituency created
- Succeeded by: John McCallister

Northern Ireland Forum Member for South Down
- In office 30 May 1996 – 25 April 1998
- Preceded by: New forum
- Succeeded by: Forum dissolved

Member of Down District Council
- In office 15 May 1985 – 17 May 1989
- Preceded by: New district
- Succeeded by: Albert Colmer
- Constituency: Rowallane
- In office 20 May 1981 – 15 May 1985
- Preceded by: Edward McVeigh
- Succeeded by: District abolished
- Constituency: Down Area A

Personal details
- Born: 14 August 1947 (age 79) Belfast, Northern Ireland
- Party: Ulster Unionist Party (before 1974;1981 - present)
- Other political affiliations: Unionist Party NI (1974-1981)
- Spouse: Oriel Nesbitt (m.1970-present)
- Children: 2
- Education: Queen's University Belfast
- Profession: Economist, academic

Dermot Nesbitt (born 14 August 1947) is a former Ulster Unionist Party (UUP) politician from Northern Ireland who was a Member of the Legislative Assembly (MLA) for South Down from 1998 to 2007.

== Background ==
Nesbitt was educated at Down High School and later studied economics at Queen's University Belfast and joined the Ulster Unionist Party (UUP). He was the election agent for Brian Faulkner from 1973–77, most of this period spent as a member of the Unionist Party of Northern Ireland. Nesbitt worked as a lecturer at Queen's and by 1981 he had rejoined the UUP, being elected to Down District Council. He held this seat until 1989.

Nesbitt was elected to the Northern Ireland Forum for South Down in 1996, and held this seat on the Northern Ireland Assembly at the 1998 and 2003 elections.

Nesbitt was a junior minister in the Office of the First Minister and Deputy First Minister of Northern Ireland from 1998 until 2002, when he took up the post of Minister of the Environment. He retired in 2007, and party colleague John McCallister retained a UUP seat in the South Down constituency. At the 1997, 2001 and 2005 general elections, Nesbitt stood unsuccessfully for the Westminster seat of South Down.

He continued to work as a lecturer in finance at Queen's University Belfast (QUB) until his early 1970s.

In mid-morning on 7 December 1983, while chatting to UUP party and Queen's colleague Edgar Graham at the University Square side of the main campus library, Nesbitt witnessed Graham (aged 29) being shot dead by an IRA gunman.

Nesbitt lives in Crossgar and is involved in a number of community and church activities in the area.

Northern Ireland Forum
New forum	Member for South Down; 1996–1998	Forum dissolved
Northern Ireland Assembly
New assembly	MLA for Down South; 1998–2007	Succeeded by John McCallister
Political offices
New office	Junior Minister; 1999–2000	Vacant Office suspended Title next held by self
Vacant Office suspended Title last held by self	Junior Minister; 2000–2002	Succeeded by James Leslie
Preceded by Sam Foster	Minister of the Environment; 2002	Vacant Office suspended Title next held by Arlene Foster
