= Malachi Curran =

Northern Irish politician

Member of the Northern Ireland Forum
- In office 30 May 1996 – 25 April 1998
- Preceded by: Forum created
- Succeeded by: Forum dissolved
- Constituency: Top-up list

Member of Down District Council
- In office 17 May 1989 – 19 May 1993
- Preceded by: Geraldine Ritchie
- Succeeded by: Gerard Mahon
- Constituency: Downpatrick
- In office 20 May 1981 – 15 May 1985
- Preceded by: George Flinn
- Succeeded by: District abolished
- Constituency: Down Area B

Personal details
- Born: 17 April 1938 Downpatrick, County Down, Northern Ireland
- Died: 13 March 2025 (aged 86) Downpatrick, County Down, Northern Ireland
- Party: Labour Party of Northern Ireland (1998–2016); Independent Labour (1981–1985)
- Other political affiliations: Labour Coalition (1996–1998); SDLP (1989–1996)

Malachi Curran (17 April 1938 – 13 March 2025) was a Northern Irish politician.

== Early life ==
Born in Downpatrick, Curran was educated at St Patrick's Grammar School and then studied law at Queen's University Belfast. He left without graduating, moving to England to work at an import company and was then drafted into the British Army. After leaving the army, he became active in the British Labour Party. He then returned to Northern Ireland to care for his father.

Curran joined the Civil Service, working there for 20 years and rising to become a deputy principal. He was active in the trade union movement, being a leading founder of the Downpatrick Trades Council and the Downpatrick Working Men's Club.

== Politics ==
Curran was elected to Down District Council in 1981 as a Labour candidate. He did not stand in 1985, but was elected to the same council in 1989 for the Social Democratic and Labour Party (SDLP).

He resigned from the SDLP to stand as a Labour coalition candidate for the Northern Ireland Forum in 1996. Although the group did not win any constituency seats, it was awarded two top-up seats, which went to Hugh Casey and Curran.

Shortly after the elections to the Forum, the Coalition dissolved. Curran was recognised as leader of the Labour group in the Forum.

With seven other leaders of Forum groupings that had supported the Good Friday Agreement, he won the Harriman Democracy Prize of the National Democratic Institute in 1998.

Curran then formed the Labour Party of Northern Ireland. Under this label, he failed to take a seat standing in South Down at the 1998 Northern Ireland Assembly election, winning only 1% of the first preference votes.

Curran stood as an independent at the 2003 elections to the Assembly, but saw his vote drop to 0.4%. At the 2007 election, he placed bottom in South Down, taking just 123 votes.

After leaving politics, Curran became the owner of a pub, the Ann Boal Inn in Killough, County Down, following the death of Ann Boal, who had been a longtime friend of Curran.

He died in March 2025.

Northern Ireland Forum
New forum	Regional Member; 1996–1998	Forum dissolved
Party political offices
Preceded by Mark Langhammer	Leader of the Labour coalition 1996–1998	Coalition dissolved
