= Patrick O'Donoghue (politician) =

Politician from Northern Ireland

MPA for South Down
- In office 1982–1986

Member for South Down
- In office 1975–1976

Assembly Member for South Down
- In office 1973–1974

Personal details
- Born: 1930; Castlewellan, County Down, Northern Ireland
- Died: 1989 (aged 58–59)
- Political party: Social Democratic and Labour

Patrick O'Donoghue (1930–1989) was a Northern Ireland politician active in the Social Democratic and Labour Party (SDLP) for a number of years.

== Biography ==
A native of Castlewellan and an active member of the Gaelic Athletic Association and Association for Legal Justice, O'Donoghue represented the SDLP on Down District Council from 1973 to 1985.

O'Donoghue was elected to the Northern Ireland Assembly in the 1973 election for South Down and served as Deputy Speaker of this body. He also served in the Northern Ireland Constitutional Convention and returned to the Assembly in the 1982 election.

Northern Ireland Assembly (1973)
| New assembly | Assembly Member for South Down; 1973–1974 | Assembly abolished |
Northern Ireland Constitutional Convention
| New convention | Member for South Down; 1975–1976 | Convention dissolved |
Northern Ireland Assembly (1982)
| New assembly | MPA for South Down; 1982–1986 | Assembly abolished |
