= William Brown (Northern Ireland politician) =

Northern Ireland politician (1930–2025)

Member of Down District Council
- In office 17 May 1989 – 19 May 1993
- Preceded by: Ethel Smyth
- Succeeded by: John Finlay
- Constituency: Newcastle
- In office 15 May 1985 – 17 May 1989
- Preceded by: District created
- Succeeded by: Walter Lyons
- Constituency: Ballynahinch
- In office 18 May 1977 – 15 May 1985
- Preceded by: William Cochrane
- Succeeded by: District abolished
- Constituency: Down Area A

Member of the Northern Ireland Assembly for South Down
- In office 20 October 1982 – 1986

Personal details
- Born: 1930
- Died: 31 January 2025 (aged 94)
- Political party: Ulster Unionist Party

William Brown (1930 – 31 January 2025) was a Northern Irish politician who was a member of the Ulster Unionist Party.

== Life and career ==
A farmer by profession Brown was active in both the Ulster Unionists and the Orange Order, and served as a member of Down District Council from 1977 to 1993. Elected to the Northern Ireland Assembly in 1982 for South Down he served as deputy chair of that body's Agriculture Committee. Brown died on 31 January 2025, at the age of 94.

Northern Ireland Assembly (1982)
New assembly	MPA for South Down; 1982–1986	Assembly abolished
