= Eddie McGrady =

Irish politician (1935–2013)

Member of Parliament for South Down
- In office 12 June 1987 – 12 April 2010
- Preceded by: Enoch Powell
- Succeeded by: Margaret Ritchie

Member of the Legislative Assembly for South Down
- In office 25 June 1998 – 26 November 2003
- Preceded by: Office created
- Succeeded by: Margaret Ritchie

Personal details
- Born: 3 June 1935 Downpatrick, Northern Ireland
- Died: 11 November 2013 (aged 78) Downpatrick, Northern Ireland
- Party: SDLP
- Spouse: Patricia McGrady
- Children: Paula; Jerry; Conaill
- Education: Belfast Technical College
- Profession: Accountant

Edward Kevin McGrady (3 June 1935 – 11 November 2013) was an Irish nationalist politician of the Social Democratic and Labour Party (SDLP), who was the Member of Parliament (MP) for South Down from 1987 to 2010.

McGrady was also a Member of the Northern Ireland Assembly (MLA) for South Down from 1998 to 2003.

== Early life ==
Born in Downpatrick, County Down, Northern Ireland, one of eleven children, McGrady was educated at St Patrick's Grammar School, Downpatrick and at Belfast Technical College, where he trained as a chartered accountant, subsequently entering his family's accountancy firm.

== Political career ==
McGrady entered politics in 1961 as an Independent Nationalist councillor on Downpatrick Urban Council, serving as chairman from 1964 until the council was replaced by Down District Council in 1973.

In the late 1960s he joined the National Democrats and stood for the party in the 1969 election to the Parliament of Northern Ireland in East Down, losing to the sitting MP and future Prime Minister of Northern Ireland Brian Faulkner.

In 1970 he became a founder member of the Social Democratic and Labour Party (SDLP), later serving as its first chairman (from 1971–1973). He sat on Down District Council from 1973 to 1989, serving as chairman from 1974–1975 and was also elected to all three regional assemblies in 1973, 1975 and 1982 representing South Down. In the 1973 power-sharing executive he was appointed as Head of the Department of Executive Planning and Co-ordination, serving from January to May 1974.

In Westminster elections he contested South Down unsuccessfully in 1979, 1983 and at the by-election of January 1986, losing on each occasion to Enoch Powell, the sitting MP. He succeeded at the fourth attempt in the general election of 1987 and held the seat until retiring in 2010. His tenure was briefly threatened in the mid-1990s when the Boundary Commission suggested merging much of his constituency with the neighbouring Newry and Armagh constituency to form a new 'Newry and Mourne' constituency. This was overturned during a local review, which preserved his seat and actually removed more Unionist sections such as Dromore. McGrady's support held solid over the years despite talk of a slippage, and this was reinforced in the 2005 Westminster election with his re-election to the House of Commons.

McGrady formerly sat on the Northern Ireland Policing Board and was a member of the Northern Ireland Assembly between 1998 and 2003.

On 25 February 2010, McGrady announced that he would stand down at the 2010 General Election.

McGrady continued to be chairperson of the Lecale Branch of the SDLP.

Northern Ireland Assembly (1973)
New assembly	Assembly Member for South Down; 1973–1974	Assembly abolished
Northern Ireland Constitutional Convention
New convention	Member for South Down; 1975–1976	Convention dissolved
Northern Ireland Assembly (1982)
New assembly	MPA for South Down; 1982–1986	Assembly abolished
Parliament of the United Kingdom
Preceded by Enoch Powell	Member of Parliament for South Down; 1987–2010	Succeeded by Margaret Ritchie
Northern Ireland Forum
New forum	Member for South Down; 1996–1998	Forum dissolved
Northern Ireland Assembly
New assembly	MLA for Down South; 1998–2003	Succeeded by Margaret Ritchie
Party political offices
New title	Chairperson of the Social Democratic and Labour Party; 1971–1973	Succeeded by Denis Haughey
Preceded by Patricia Lewsley	Chairperson of the Social Democratic and Labour Party; 2007–2009	Succeeded by Joe Byrne
