= Eamon O'Neill =

Irish politician (born 1944)

Member of the Legislative Assembly for South Down
- In office 25 June 1998 – 26 November 2003
- Preceded by: Office created
- Succeeded by: Willie Clarke

Personal details
- Born: 15 September 1944 (age 82) Emyvale, County Monaghan, Ireland
- Party: Social Democratic and Labour Party
- Education: Open University

Eamon O'Neill (born 15 September 1944) is an Irish Social Democratic and Labour Party (SDLP) politician who was a Member of the Northern Ireland Assembly (MLA) for South Down from 1998 to 2003.

Born in Emyvale, County Monaghan, O'Neill studied at St Mary's College in Strawberry Hill, then with the Open University. He began working as a teacher in St. Malachy's High School in 1968, serving as Vice Principal from 1986–1998 and over-seeing the school's transition to A-levels. Eamon has been a community leader in the Castlewellan and Newcastle area since the Northern Ireland Civil Rights Movement. In 1977 he was elected to Down District Council for the Social Democratic and Labour Party (SDLP), and has now served on the Council for 34 years.

At the 1998 Northern Ireland Assembly election, O'Neill was elected in South Down. However, he narrowly lost his seat at the 2003 election and failed to regain it at the 2011 elections. Eamon was later Chair of Down District Council.

Northern Ireland Assembly
New assembly	MLA for Down South; 1998–2003	Succeeded by Willie Clarke
