= Down District Council =

District Council in Northern Ireland

Coordinates: 54.352°N 5.731°W

Down District
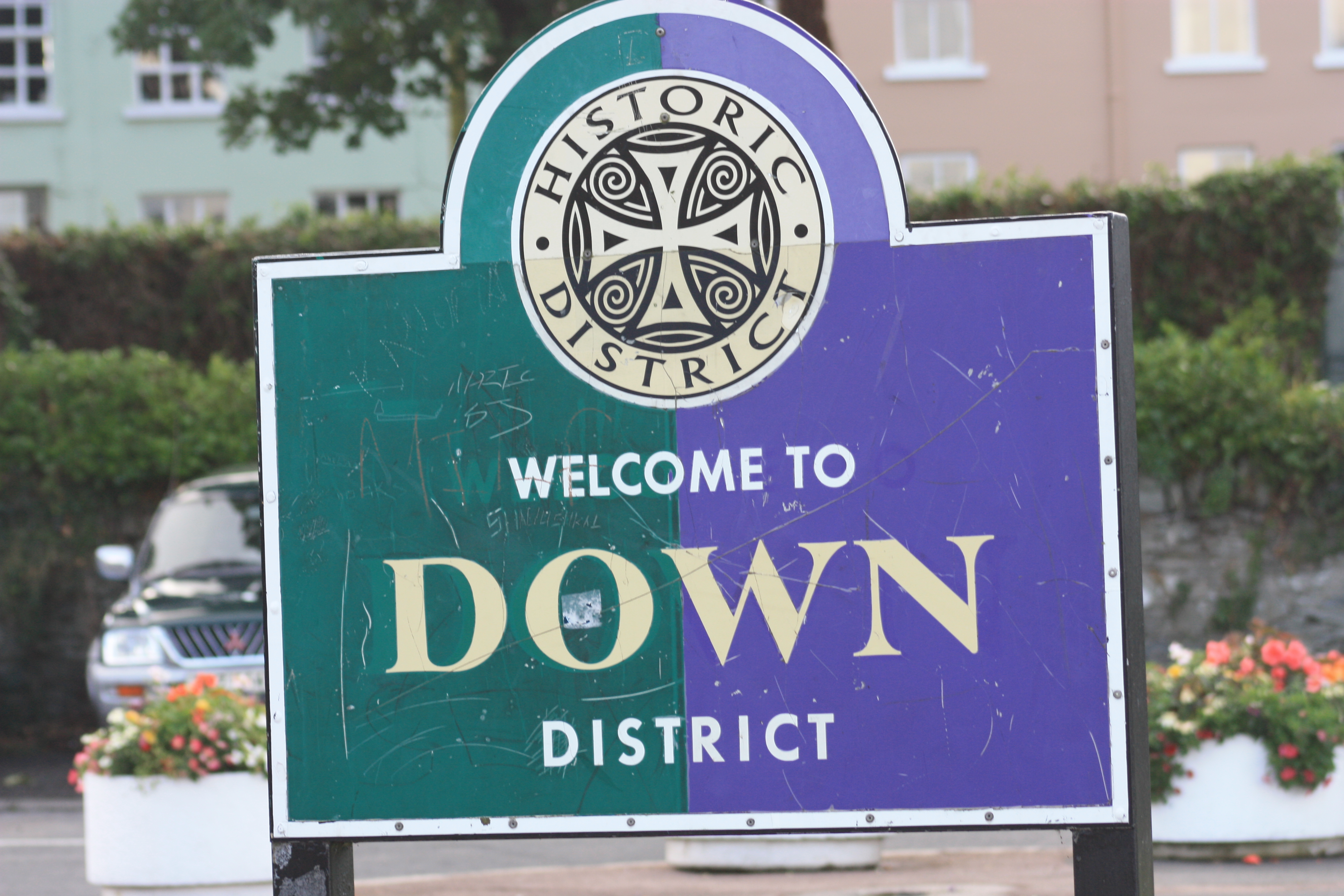
- Sign bearing Down District Council logo

- Area: 647 km^{2} (250 sq mi); Ranked 7th of 26
- District HQ: Downpatrick
- Catholic: 62.5%
- Protestant: 32.1%
- Country: Northern Ireland
- Sovereign state: United Kingdom
- Councillors: MLAs South Down & Strangford DUP: 3 UUP: 1 Sinn Féin: 2 SDLP: 1 Alliance Party: 3; MPs Chris Hazzard (SF) Jim Shannon (DUP)

Map of the district's DEAs from 1993 to 2014

Down District Council was a Local Council in County Down in Northern Ireland. It merged with Newry and Mourne District Council in April 2015 under local government reorganisation in Northern Ireland to become Newry, Mourne and Down District Council.

The council was headquartered in Downpatrick. Other towns in the Council area were Ardglass, Ballynahinch, Castlewellan, Clough, Crossgar, Dundrum, Killough, Killyleagh, Newcastle, Saintfield, Seaforde and Strangford.

The Down District Council area consisted of 4 electoral areas: Ballynahinch, Downpatrick, Newcastle and Rowallane. At the last election in 2011, 23 Councillors were elected from the following political parties: 9 SDLP, 5 Sinn Féin, 3 DUP, 3 UUP, 1 Alliance Party, 1 Green Party, 1 Independent. The Council Chairman for the 2011/2012 council term was Councillor Dermot Curran (SDLP) and the Vice Chair is Councillor Liam Johnston (Sinn Féin).

In elections for the Westminster Parliament, Down was split between the Strangford constituency and the South Down constituency.

== Work of the council ==
The council periodically had to provide funding to ensure that the Saint Patrick Visitor Centre in Downpatrick remained in operation. It also funded a major promenade infrastructure regeneration in Newcastle. The new promenade has won a number of National awards including a Civic Trust Award for Excellence in the Public Realm.

== Review of Public Administration ==
Under the Review of Public Administration (RPA) the council was due to merge with Newry and Mourne District Council in 2011 to form a single council for the enlarged area totalling 1539 km^{2} and a population of 150,886. The first election to the new council was due to take place in May 2009, but on 25 April 2008, Shaun Woodward, Secretary of State for Northern Ireland announced that the scheduled 2009 district council elections were to be postponed until the introduction of the eleven new councils in 2011. The planned change was abandoned in 2010 and the most recent election took place in May 2011 under the existing boundaries.

== Population ==
The area covered by Down District Council had a population of 69,731 residents according to the 2011 Northern Ireland census.

== See also ==
- Local government in Northern Ireland
