= Patrick Brown (Northern Irish politician) =

Alliance Party of Northern Ireland former MLA

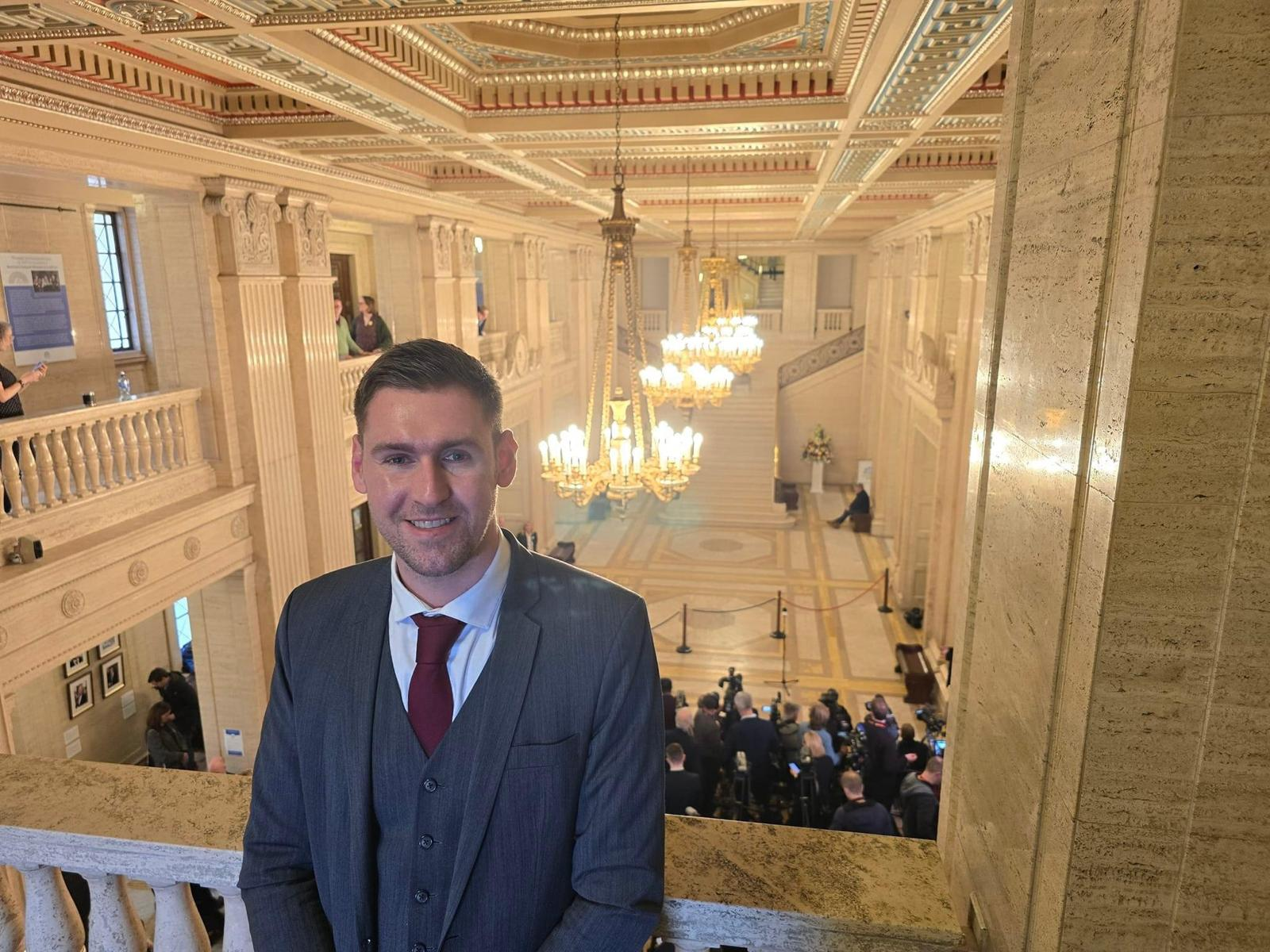

Member of the Northern Ireland Assembly for South Down
- In office 7 May 2022 – 23 April 2024
- Preceded by: Sinéad Bradley
- Succeeded by: Andrew McMurray

Member of Newry, Mourne and Down District Council
- In office 22 May 2014 – 7 May 2022
- Preceded by: Council established
- Succeeded by: David Lee-Surginor
- Constituency: Rowallane

Personal details
- Party: Alliance
- Occupation: Politician

Patrick Brown is a Northern Irish former politician who was an Alliance Party Member of the Legislative Assembly (MLA). He was elected as an MLA in the 2022 Northern Ireland Assembly election for South Down, and before that served as a councillor on Newry, Mourne and Down District council since 2014.

He resigned in April 2024 after 10 years as a public representative to take up a job running a non-profit organisation working on basic income advocacy.

== Early life ==
Brown grew up in Crossgar and Downpatrick where he attended two schools, including Shimna Integrated College. Brown went to University of Sheffield, where he received his bachelor's degree and master's degrees in political science and international development respectively.

Upon his return to Northern Ireland, Brown started several small businesses, including a water and sanitation charity doing work in East Africa and a firm that supports social enterprises and other third sector organizations.

Brown founded a political travel business, Politrip, in 2017 before selling the brand in 2021 to a new company set up by Politrip's then general manager to continue its operations - Volunteer USA Ltd. The business allowed young people to volunteer on election campaigns in the US. This business was damaged by the Covid epidemic and forced to close in 2023.

Brown was awarded his Ph.D. on Universal basic income and Conflict transformation at Queen's University Belfast only weeks after his election in May 2022's Assembly elections in Northern Ireland.

== Political career ==
During his undergraduate studies, Brown did a two-week work placement in Naomi Long's office in Westminster.

In 2014, Brown was one of the youngest people to be elected as a Councillor in Newry, Mourne and Down District Council. In March 2017, Brown was arrested for drink driving his motorbike. His case was referred to the council's standards watchdog, who suspended Brown from his council duties for six months. At the time he apologised for what he called an ‘incredibly stupid decision’ and worked with a road safety charity to better understand the impact drink driving has on people’s lives. He was re-elected five years later in the 2019 local elections topping the poll in the Rowallane area.

During his time in Newry, Mourne and Down Council Brown made a name for himself as an outspoken critic of the local authority, challenging their lack of openness and transparency over decision-making and spending priorities, particularly regarding large capital projects such as new council offices in Newry and a ‘gondola’ in Newcastle.

He also led a number of campaigns on progressive and green issues, including securing the council’s support for equal marriage, abortion liberalisation and divestment of councillor pension funds from fossil fuels.

Brown first ran for the Northern Ireland Assembly in 2016, achieving Alliances best result in the South Down constituency up to that date with 5.36% of the vote. In the 2017 Assembly elections Brown almost doubled his vote to 9.18%, narrowly missing the 5th seat.

Brown won 13.9% of the vote in the 2019 UK Parliamentary election in South Down, placing 4th overall with 6916 votes the party’s highest vote in a Westminster election in South Down to date.

In the 2022 Assembly election, Brown was the 3rd candidate elected in South Down, winning 6942 first preference votes. Notably, Brown became the first Alliance MLA for South Down, a largely Nationalist constituency.

As an MLA, Brown served as the party’s spokesperson on Animal Welfare, anti-poverty spokesperson, and Infrastructure at various times. In the Assembly, he sat on the Infrastructure and Windsor Framework Committees. He founded an All-party Group on UBI at Stormont, the first of its kind anywhere in the UK.

In November 2023, it was revealed that a political travel business founded by Brown but sold to its then General manager in late 2021 had gone bust owing thousands of pounds to students who would not get their money back after their trips were cancelled. Instead they were offered "internship[s]" with the Alliance Party ahead of the 2022 Northern Ireland Assembly election campaign. The firm, Volunteer USA Ltd – trading as Politrip - went into liquidation in 2022 with debts of more than £64,000. While Brown expressed his sympathies for the students affected, he made it clear he was no longer responsible for the company, which he had sold in Autumn 2021.

Brown stood down as an MLA with immediate effect on 23 April 2024 due to "personal reasons" after 10 years as an elected representative. He later issued a statement clarifying that he had accepted a job offer earlier that month, to run a non-profit organisation called Equal Right which campaigns for universal basic income, and that he felt he had been ‘struggling’ in the role as an MLA for some time, including coming to terms with a recent diagnosis of ADHD.

It later emerged that Brown had been facing an investigation from a standards watchdog, following a complaint made in 2023 about Brown's conduct towards Shimna Integrated College in Newcastle, County Down, and its board of governors. The complaint was made by the school, in response to Brown lodging his own complaint against the school in 2022 on behalf of numerous constituents who had approached him to raise serious concerns, including relating issues related to governance and bullying at the school.

It was alleged in the complaint that because Brown would not reveal the names of the constituents who raised these concerns (which he claimed had come to him on the basis of anonymity), and because he had previously applied to be a governor on the school’s board (but was rejected because he was aligned to a political party, which Brown had challenged as an attempt to manipulate board membership) that he was acting out of his own personal interest. The complaint was partially upheld with the Standards and Privileges Committee concluding that Brown should not have referenced his own application to the board when raising concerns on behalf of constituents. The Committee report also found that there was evidence of constituents raising these concerns with Brown. A group called Shimna Support Group was formed by parents soon after to represent those concerned about the school’s direction of travel.

Brown strongly rejected any suggestion that the complaint led to his resignation, and was adamant that he had done nothing wrong and was only representing constituents concerns.

== Electoral record ==
2022 Assembly election: South Down – 5 seats
Party	Candidate	FPv%	Count					
Party	Candidate	FPv%	1	2	3	4	5	6
Sinn Féin	Sinéad Ennis	26.17%	14,381					
Sinn Féin	Cathy Mason	18.13%	9,963					
Alliance	Patrick Brown	12.63%	6,942	8,071	8,251	8,865	9,301	
DUP	Diane Forsythe	11.82%	6,497	6,512	6,513	6,617	8,034	11,073
SDLP	Colin McGrath	11.07%	6,082	7,748	8,164	8,798	8,933	9,119
SDLP	Karen McKevitt	5.47%	3,006	4,772	4,875	5,090	5,139	5,259
TUV	Harold McKee	5.96%	3,273	3,279	3,280	3,332	4,118	
UUP	Jill Macauley	5.24%	2,880	2,900	2,902	2,944		
Aontú	Rosemary McGlone	2.14%	1,177	1,439	1,488			
Green (NI)	Noeleen Lynch	0.75%	412	564	580			
People Before Profit	Paul McCrory	0.37%	205	270	283			
Independent	Patrick Clarke	0.24%	134	209	224			
Electorate: 84,046 Valid: 54,952 (65.38%) Spoilt: 679 Quota: 9,159 Turnout: 55,631 (66.19%)

UK General election 2019: South Down
Party	Candidate	Votes	%	±%
Sinn Féin	Chris Hazzard	16,137	32.4	―7.5
SDLP	Michael Savage	14,517	29.2	―5.9
DUP	Glyn Hanna	7,619	15.3	―2.1
Alliance	Patrick Brown	6,916	13.9	+10.3
UUP	Jill Macauley	3,307	6.6	+2.7
Aontú	Paul Brady	1,266	2.5	New
Majority		1,620	3.2	―1.6
Turnout		49,762	62.9	―4.3
Registered electors		79,113		
Sinn Féin hold		Swing	―0.8	

2017 Assembly election: South Down – 5 seats
Party	Candidate	FPv%	Count						
Party	Candidate	FPv%	1	2	3	4	5	6	7
Sinn Féin	Sinéad Ennis	20.76%	10,256						
Sinn Féin	Chris Hazzard	17.87%	8,827						
SDLP	Sinéad Bradley	14.82%	7,323	7,487	8,906.12				
DUP	Jim Wells	15.76%	7,786	8,088	8,091.36	8,091.64	10,821.64		
SDLP	Colin McGrath	10.34%	5,110	5,202	5,512.8	6,043.68	6,632.42	7,228.42	7,613.62
Alliance	Patrick Brown	9.18%	4,535	4,883	5,101.64	5,194.88	6,007.82	6,730.82	6,874.66
UUP	Harold McKee	8.45%	4,172	4,509	4,522.44	4,527.76			
TUV	Lyle Rea	1.28%	630						
Green (NI)	Hannah George	0.98%	483						
Independent	Patrick Clarke	0.39%	192						
NI Conservatives	Gary Hynds	0.17%	85						
Electorate: 75,415 Valid: 49,399 (65.50%) Spoilt: 535 Quota: 8,234 Turnout: 49,932 (66.21%)

2016 Assembly election: South Down – 6 seats
Party	Candidate	FPv%	Count							
Party	Candidate	FPv%	1	2	3	4	5	6	7	8
DUP	Jim Wells	12.25%	5,033	5,183	6,470					
UUP	Harold McKee	8.47%	3,481	3,812	5,168	5,567	6,141			
Sinn Féin	Chris Hazzard	12.28%	5,045	5,142	5,144	5,321	5,321.5	7,277.5		
SDLP	Sinéad Bradley	12.32%	5,059	5,231	5,241	5,828	5,834	6,144		
Sinn Féin	Caitríona Ruane	10.20%	4,191	4,240	4,244	4,335	4,335	5,415	6,664.5	
SDLP	Colin McGrath	10.44%	4,288	4,429	4,440	5,033	5,038	5,121	5,190	5,397
SDLP	Seán Rogers	8.68%	3,564	3,699	3,721	4,076	4,086.5	4,227.5	4,309	4,595.75
Sinn Féin	Michael Gray-Sloan	8.57%	3,520	3,571	3,572	3,665	3,665			
Alliance	Patrick Brown	5.36%	2,200	2,841	2,869					
TUV	Henry Reilly	6.62%	2,718	2,800						
Independent	John McCallister	2.81%	1,156							
Green (NI)	John Hardy	2.00%	820							
Electorate: 77,409 Valid: 41,075 (53.06%) Spoilt: 570 Quota: 5,868 Turnout: 41,645 (53.80%)
