= 2011 Down District Council election =

Local govt election in Northern Ireland

← 2005	5 May 2011	2014 →

All 23 seats to Down District Council 12 seats needed for a majority
	First party	Second party	Third party
Party	SDLP	Sinn Féin	DUP
Seats won	9	5	3
Seat change	▼1	Steady	Steady
	Fourth party	Fifth party	Sixth party
Party	UUP	Alliance	Green (NI)
Seats won	3	1	1
Seat change	▼1	▲1	Steady
	Seventh party
Party	Independent
Seats won	1
Seat change	▲1
- Party with the most votes by district.

Elections to Down District Council were held on 5 May 2011 on the same day as the other Northern Irish local government elections. The election used four district electoral areas to elect a total of 23 councillors.

== Election results ==
Down District Council Election Result 2011
Party	Seats	Gains	Losses	Net gain/loss	Seats %	Votes %	Votes	+/−
SDLP	9	0	1	▼1	39.1	34.2	8,666	▼3.3
Sinn Féin	5	0	0	Steady	21.7	22.9	5,806	▼0.2
DUP	3	0	0	Steady	13.0	16.4	4,152	▲0.1
UUP	3	0	1	▼1	13.0	13.2	3,346	▼4.1
Alliance	1	1	0	▲1	4.3	4.9	1,252	▲2.8
Independent	1	1	0	▲1	4.3	4.2	1,073	▲4.2
Green (NI)	1	0	0	Steady	4.3	4.1	1,035	▲0.8

Note: "Votes" are the first preference votes.

== Districts summary ==
Results of the Down District Council election, 2011 by district
Ward	%	Cllrs	%	Cllrs	%	Cllrs	%	Cllrs	%	Cllrs	%	Cllrs	%	Cllrs	Total Cllrs
Ward	SDLP		Sinn Féin		DUP		UUP		Alliance		Green		Others		Total Cllrs
Ballynahinch	26.5	2	20.4	1	26.0	1	14.3	1	3.6	0	3.0	0	6.2	0	5
Downpatrick	57.4	4	27.4	2	2.4	0	4.8	0	0.0	0	8.0	1	0.0	0	7
Newcastle	33.3	2	36.3	2	7.8	0	9.5	1	8.4	1	4.6	0	0.0	0	6
Rowallane	15.8	1	4.9	0	32.9	2	26.3	1	8.1	0	0.0	0	12.0	1	5
Total	34.2	9	22.9	5	16.4	3	13.2	3	4.9	1	4.1	1	4.3	1	23

== Districts results ==
=== Ballynahinch ===
2005: 2 x SDLP, 1 x DUP, 1 x Sinn Féin, 1 x UUP
2011: 2 x SDLP, 1 x DUP, 1 x Sinn Féin, 1 x UUP
2005-2011 Change: No change

Ballynahinch - 5 seats
Party	Candidate	FPv%	Count					
Party	Candidate	FPv%	1	2	3	4	5	6
DUP	Garth Craig	21.32%	1,260					
Sinn Féin	Michael Coogan*	20.41%	1,206					
UUP	Walter Lyons	14.26%	843	898.88	899.57	908.02	971.91	1,145.91
SDLP	Anne Marie McAleenan*	12.52%	740	742.42	833.27	878.49	944.17	979.17
SDLP	Patrick Toman*	14.01%	828	830.42	883.09	913.38	943.13	967.67
Independent	Mark Murnin	6.24%	369	372.74	415.75	451.12	507.09	549.01
DUP	Yvonne Moore	4.65%	275	478.28	478.97	485.97	504.19	
Alliance	Andy Corkhill	3.60%	213	215.2	225.55	269.16		
Green (NI)	Mark McCormick	2.98%	176	176.88	195.74			
Electorate: 10,680 Valid: 5,910 (55.34%) Spoilt: 116 Quota: 986 Turnout: 6,026 (56.42%)

=== Downpatrick ===
2005: 4 x SDLP, 2 x Sinn Féin, 1 x Green
2011: 2 x SDLP, 2 x Sinn Féin, 1 x Green
2005-2011 Change: No change

Downpatrick - 7 seats
Party	Candidate	FPv%	Count							
Party	Candidate	FPv%	1	2	3	4	5	6	7	8
SDLP	Colin McGrath*	16.64%	1,144							
SDLP	Dermot Curran*	14.53%	999							
SDLP	Peter Craig*	12.74%	876							
Sinn Féin	Éamonn McConvey*	12.10%	832	850.25	850.5	859.95	1,019.95			
Sinn Féin	Liam Johnston*	9.81%	674	688.75	690.75	697.05	817.6	955.6		
SDLP	John Doris*	8.82%	606	718.75	724	799.15	812.5	814.5	830.5	900.5
Green (NI)	Cadogan Enright	7.99%	549	577.25	589.25	601.55	627.15	632.15	647.15	821.1
SDLP	Gareth Sharvin	4.66%	320	407.25	418.5	440.4	484.65	492.65	506.65	552.05
UUP	Annette Holden	4.80%	330	331.25	463.25	465.35	465.35	465.35	465.35	
Sinn Féin	Martin Rice	5.47%	376	379.75	380.75	390.65				
DUP	Andrew Steenson	2.44%	168	175						
Electorate: 13,640 Valid: 6,874 (50.40%) Spoilt: 163 Quota: 860 Turnout: 7,037 (51.59%)

=== Newcastle ===
2005: 3 x SDLP, 2 x Sinn Féin, 1 x UUP
2011: 2 x SDLP, 2 x Sinn Féin, 1 x UUP, 1 x Alliance
2005-2011 Change: Alliance gain from SDLP

Newcastle - 6 seats
Party	Candidate	FPv%	Count							
Party	Candidate	FPv%	1	2	3	4	5	6	7	8
Sinn Féin	Willie Clarke*	17.49%	1,171							
SDLP	Eamon O'Neill*	15.81%	1,058							
SDLP	Carmel O'Boyle*	11.47%	768	787.08	831.63	917.34	1,181.34			
Sinn Féin	Stephen Burns	11.89%	796	892.84	898.42	931.95	958.95			
UUP	Desmond Patterson	9.50%	636	636.54	637.8	655.98	663.7	676.7	1,124.7	
Alliance	Patrick Clarke	8.44%	565	570.58	575.26	665.8	702.72	746.72	773.35	936.55
Sinn Féin	Brian Morgan	6.95%	465	531.06	532.95	542.03	615.75	668.75	670.02	672.9
DUP	Stanley Priestley	7.80%	522	522.54	523.98	526.16	528.34	528.34		
SDLP	Peter Fitzpatrick*	6.02%	403	412.72	442.69	470.59				
Green (NI)	John Hardy	4.63%	310	315.76	318.55					
Electorate: 12,216 Valid: 6,694 (54.80%) Spoilt: 132 Quota: 957 Turnout: 6,826 (55.88%)

=== Rowallane ===
2005: 2 x DUP, 2 x UUP, 1 x SDLP
2011: 2 x DUP, 1 x UUP, 1 x SDLP, 1 x Independent
2005-2011 Change: Independent gain from UUP

Rowallane - 5 seats
Party	Candidate	FPv%	Count			
Party	Candidate	FPv%	1	2	3	4
DUP	William Dick*	17.21%	1,007			
SDLP	Maria McCarthy	13.82%	809	1,092		
UUP	Robert Burgess*	14.30%	837	840	969	982.26
DUP	William Walker*	15.72%	920	927	971	976.46
Independent	Terry Andrews	12.03%	704	763	884	976.04
UUP	Graham Furey	11.96%	700	705	761	764.9
Alliance	Patrick Brown	8.10%	474	491		
Sinn Féin	Catriona Mackel	4.89%	286			
SDLP	Patricia McKay	1.97%	115			
Electorate: 11,090 Valid: 5,852 (52.77%) Spoilt: 83 Quota: 976 Turnout: 5,935 (53.52%)
