= 2016 United Kingdom devolved elections =

The United Kingdom held elections to its devolved governments on 5 May 2016:

- 2016 National Assembly for Wales election
- 2016 Northern Ireland Assembly election
- 2016 Scottish Parliament election
