= Labour Representation Committee =

Labour Representation Committee may refer to:

- Labour Representation Committee (1900), the original name of the British Labour Party
- Labour Representation Committee (2004), a 21st-century pressure group within the British Labour Party
- Belfast Labour Representation Committee, group active in the 1910s which later became the Belfast Labour Party
- Northern Ireland Labour Representation Committee, a party label started in 2016 by Labour Party activists in Northern Ireland
