= 2005 Down District Council election =

Local govt election in Northern Ireland

← 2001	5 May 2005	2011 →

All 23 seats to Down District Council 12 seats needed for a majority
	First party	Second party	Third party
Party	SDLP	Sinn Féin	UUP
Seats won	10	5	4
Seat change	0	▲1	▼2
	Fourth party	Fifth party	Sixth party
Party	DUP	Green (NI)	Independent
Seats won	3	1	0
Seat change	▲1	▲1	▼1
- Party with the most votes by district.

Elections to Down District Council were held on 5 May 2005 on the same day as the other Northern Irish local government elections. The election used four district electoral areas to elect a total of 23 councillors.

== Election results ==
Down District Council Election Result 2005
Party	Seats	Gains	Losses	Net gain/loss	Seats %	Votes %	Votes	+/−
SDLP	10	0	0	0	43.5	37.5	10,276	▼3.7
Sinn Féin	5	1	0	▲1	21.7	23.1	6,336	▲5.9
UUP	4	0	2	▼2	17.4	17.3	4,748	▼4.5
DUP	3	1	0	▲1	13.0	16.3	4,471	▲2.0
Green (NI)	1	1	0	▲1	4.3	3.3	900	▲3.3
Alliance	0	0	0	0	0.0	2.1	585	▲2.1
Workers' Party	0	0	0	0	0.0	0.4	97	0.0

Note: "Votes" are the first preference votes.

== Districts summary ==
Results of the Down District Council election, 2005 by district
Ward	%	Cllrs	%	Cllrs	%	Cllrs	%	Cllrs	%	Cllrs	%	Cllrs	Total Cllrs
Ward	SDLP		Sinn Féin		UUP		DUP		Green		Others		Total Cllrs
Ballynahinch	33.3	2	19.9	1	19.9	1	26.8	1	0.0	0	0.0	0	5
Downpatrick	50.7	4	32.2	2	8.5	0	0.0	0	7.4	1	1.2	0	7
Newcastle	40.4	3	32.3	2	11.3	1	10.4	0	2.1	0	3.5	0	6
Rowallane	22.3	1	4.9	0	32.3	2	32.3	2	2.9	0	5.3	0	5
Total	37.5	10	23.1	5	17.3	4	16.3	3	3.3	1	2.5	0	23

== Districts results ==
=== Ballynahinch ===
2001: 2 x SDLP, 1 x DUP, 1 x Sinn Féin, 1 x UUP
2005: 2 x SDLP, 1 x DUP, 1 x Sinn Féin, 1 x UUP
2001-2005 Change: No change

Ballynahinch - 5 seats
Party	Candidate	FPv%	Count					
Party	Candidate	FPv%	1	2	3	4	5	6
DUP	Jim Wells*	20.85%	1,305					
Sinn Féin	Michael Coogan	19.94%	1,248					
UUP	Peter Bowles	12.90%	807	845	847.07	1,211.07		
SDLP	Anne Marie McAleenan*	11.92%	746	748.6	832.55	838.98	854.91	1,188.91
SDLP	Patrick Toman*	14.01%	877	877.8	934.84	942.5	956.66	1,055.23
DUP	Samuel Hanna	5.99%	375	554	554	624.8	735.72	749.85
SDLP	Francis Casement	7.38%	462	463	517.51	524.14	548.92	
UUP	Walter Lyons	7.00%	438	471	472.61			
Electorate: 9,963 Valid: 6,258 (62.81%) Spoilt: 106 Quota: 1,044 Turnout: 6,364 (63.88%)

=== Downpatrick ===
2001: 4 x SDLP, 1 x Sinn Féin, 1 x UUP, 1 x Independent
2005: 4 x SDLP, 2 x Sinn Féin, 1 x Green
2001-2005 Change: Sinn Féin and Green gain from UUP and Independent

Downpatrick - 7 seats
Party	Candidate	FPv%	Count							
Party	Candidate	FPv%	1	2	3	4	5	6	7	8
Sinn Féin	Éamonn McConvey*	16.43%	1,259							
SDLP	Peter Craig*	13.83%	1,060							
SDLP	Dermot Curran*	12.25%	939	965.64						
SDLP	John Doris*	11.29%	865	876.28	884.52	976.52				
SDLP	Colin McGrath	8.14%	624	633.84	644.84	890.76	964.13			
Sinn Féin	Liam Johnston	9.42%	722	837.68	840.68	855.12	866.56	870.24	1,290.24	
Green (NI)	Bill Corry	7.37%	565	570.28	597	624.48	632.95	643.07	691.34	780.34
UUP	William Murphy	8.48%	650	651.92	659.16	667.64	670.06	671.44	679.87	686.87
Sinn Féin	Caitríona Mackel	6.30%	483	596.04	602.52	612.72	615.69	617.99		
SDLP	Daniel McEvoy	5.22%	400	406.72	418.2					
Workers' Party	Desmond O'Hagan	1.27%	97	99.4						
Electorate: 12,695 Valid: 7,664 (60.37%) Spoilt: 169 Quota: 959 Turnout: 7,833 (61.70%)

=== Newcastle ===
2001: 3 x SDLP, 2 x Sinn Féin, 1 x UUP
2005: 3 x SDLP, 2 x Sinn Féin, 1 x UUP
2001-2005 Change: No change

Newcastle - 6 seats
Party	Candidate	FPv%	Count					
Party	Candidate	FPv%	1	2	3	4	5	6
SDLP	Eamon O'Neill*	19.28%	1,379					
Sinn Féin	Willie Clarke*	18.19%	1,301					
SDLP	Carmel O'Boyle*	13.09%	936	1,090.18				
Sinn Féin	Hugh McDowell*	6.56%	469	479.66	656.54	679.78	682.42	1,146.42
SDLP	Peter Fitzpatrick*	8.01%	573	718.08	750.42	903.9	963.42	1,032.6
UUP	Gerald Douglas*	11.30%	808	816.32	821.82	907.04	909.68	918.76
DUP	Stanley Priestley	10.40%	744	746.86	747.08	760.56	760.8	762.56
Sinn Féin	Aíne McEvoy	7.57%	541	555.3	606.34	624.36	626.16	
Alliance	Neil Powell	3.52%	252	260.06	266.22			
Green (NI)	Peter McCarron	2.07%	148	154.76	159.16			
Electorate: 11,446 Valid: 7,151 (62.48%) Spoilt: 172 Quota: 1,022 Turnout: 7,323 (63.98%)

=== Rowallane ===
2001: 3 x UUP, 1 x DUP, 1 x SDLP
2005: 2 x UUP, 2 x DUP, 1 x SDLP
2001-2005 Change: DUP gain from UUP

Rowallane - 5 seats
Party	Candidate	FPv%	Count						
Party	Candidate	FPv%	1	2	3	4	5	6	7
DUP	William Dick*	20.91%	1,326						
SDLP	Margaret Ritchie*	17.43%	1,105						
UUP	Robert Burgess*	14.64%	928	961	975	975.72	979.76	1,065.76	
UUP	Edward Rea*	9.15%	580	589	610.2	612.12	621.12	690.6	1,067.6
DUP	William Walker	11.37%	721	913.8	921.2	921.56	926.6	940.8	1,027.24
SDLP	Patricia McKay	4.89%	310	310.8	342.8	376.56	592.04	716.04	772
UUP	Albert Colmer*	8.47%	537	560.4	570.6	572.12	575.2	649.84	
Alliance	Lorna Dunn	5.25%	333	333.8	415	416.64	439.8		
Sinn Féin	Mary Robb	4.94%	313	313	319	322.08			
Green (NI)	Philip Orr	2.95%	187	188					
Electorate: 10,330 Valid: 6,340 (61.37%) Spoilt: 89 Quota: 1,057 Turnout: 6,429 (62.24%)
