= Caoimhe Archibald =

Minister for Finance of Northern Ireland since 2024

Caoimhe Archibald MLA
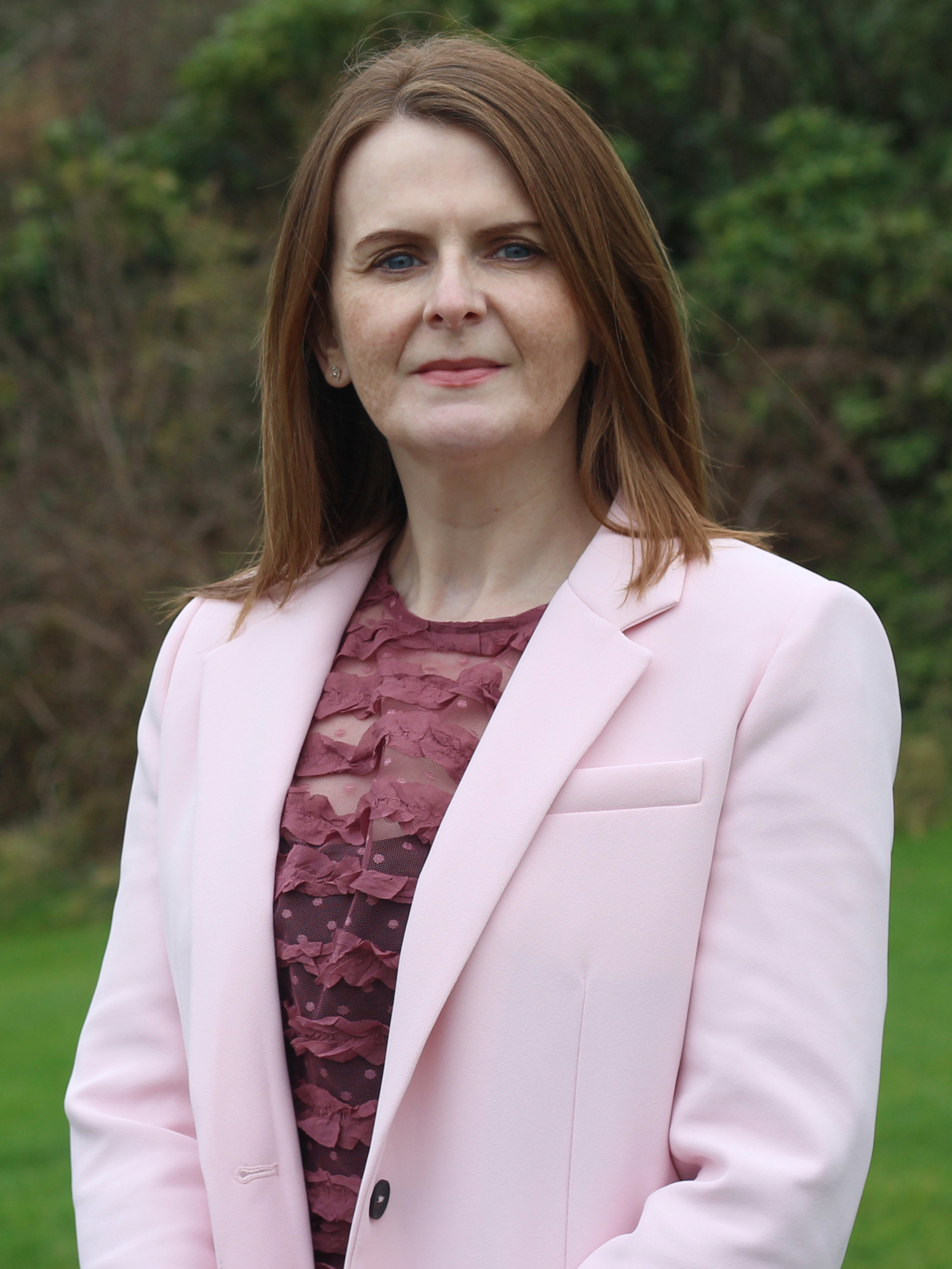
- Archibald in 2022

Minister for the Economy
- Incumbent
- Assumed office 3 February 2025
- First Minister: Michelle O'Neill
- Preceded by: Conor Murphy

Minister of Finance
- In office 3 February 2024 – 3 February 2025
- First Minister: Michelle O'Neill
- Preceded by: Conor Murphy
- Succeeded by: John O'Dowd

Member of the Legislative Assembly for East Londonderry
- Incumbent
- Assumed office 7 May 2016
- Preceded by: Cathal Ó hOisín

Personal details
- Born: 20 February 1981 (age 45) Coleraine, Northern Ireland
- Party: Sinn Féin
- Education: Queen's University of Belfast
- Website: Official webpage

Caoimhe Archibald (born 20 February 1981) is an Irish Sinn Féin politician, who has served as the Minister for the Economy in Northern Ireland since February 2025. She previously served as Minister for Finance, and has been a Member of the Northern Ireland Assembly (MLA) for East Londonderry since May 2016.

== Biography ==
Archibald is a native of Coleraine where she attended Loreto College. She proceeded to Queen's University, Belfast where she obtained a BSc and PhD in molecular mycology. She then worked for an agri-food company in Dublin.

== Political career ==
She unsuccessfully stood for election in the East Londonderry Westminster constituency at the 2015 UK general election, polling 6,859 votes, equating to 19.8% of the total vote.

She was elected as an MLA at the 2016 Northern Ireland Assembly election, to represent the East Londonderry constituency. She won the seat from her party running mate Cathal Ó hOisín. She was re-elected in 2017 and 2022.

In February 2024, she was appointed as Minister for Finance in the newly formed Northern Ireland Executive.

In February 2025, as part of a Sinn Féin ministerial reshuffle, she replaced Conor Murphy as Minister for the Economy, after he was elected to the Seanad Éireann.

Northern Ireland Assembly
Preceded by Cathal Ó hOisín	MLA for East Londonderry; 2016–present	Incumbent
