= Karen McKevitt =

Irish politician (born 1971)

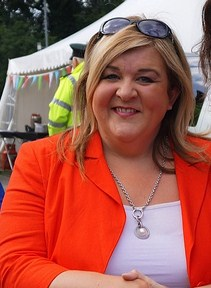

Member of Newry, Mourne and Down District Council
- In office 2 May 2019 – 18 May 2023
- Preceded by: Gillian Fitzpatrick
- Succeeded by: Selina Murphy
- Constituency: Crotlieve

Member of the Northern Ireland Assembly for South Down
- In office 5 May 2011 – 5 May 2016
- Preceded by: P. J. Bradley
- Succeeded by: Sinead Bradley

Member of Newry and Mourne District Council
- In office 5 May 2005 – 5 May 2011
- Preceded by: Paul McKibben
- Succeeded by: Declan McAleer
- Constituency: Crotlieve

Personal details
- Born: 9 July 1971 (age 54) Newry, Northern Ireland
- Party: SDLP

Karen McKevitt is an Irish Social Democratic and Labour Party (SDLP) politician who served as a Member of the Northern Ireland Assembly (MLA) for South Down from 2011 to 2016.

== Political career ==
McKevitt entered politics in 2005 when she was elected to Newry and Mourne council, topping the poll in the Crotlieve electoral area.

She stood in the Newry and Armagh constituency in the 2016 Assembly election, getting 3,923 first preference votes, but failed to win a seat.

McKevitt was elected to the Crotlieve DEA on Newry, Mourne and Down District Council at the 2019 local government election.

She was selected to run for the SDLP in the 2022 Northern Ireland Assembly election in her former constituency of South Down alongside Colin McGrath, but was not elected.

Northern Ireland Assembly
Preceded by P. J. Bradley	MLA for South Down; 2011–2016	Succeeded by Sinead Bradley
