= Rowallane (District Electoral Area) =

District electoral area in Northern Ireland

- Newry, Mourne and Down District Council DEA constituency

Current constituency
- Created: 1985
- Seats: 5 (1985-)
- Councillors: Terry Andrews (SDLP); Callum Bowsie (DUP); Jonny Jackson (DUP); Tierna Kelly (APNI); David Lee-Surginor (APNI)

Rowallane DEA within Newry, Mourne and Down

Rowallane DEA (1993-2014) within Down

Rowallane is one of the seven district electoral areas (DEA) in Newry, Mourne and Down, Northern Ireland. The district elects five members to Newry, Mourne and Down District Council and contains the wards of Ballynahinch, Crossgar and Killyleagh, Derryboy, Kilmore and Saintfield. Rowallane forms part of the Strangford constituencies for the Northern Ireland Assembly and UK Parliament and part of the South Down constituencies for the Northern Ireland Assembly and UK Parliament. Following reviews and recommendations of Parliamentary Constituencies the Rowallane DEA was shared between Strangford and South Belfast & Mid Down Constituencies implemented for the 2024 Westminster elections and the next Assembly elections will be fought on these boundary changes in 2027/28.

It was created for the 1985 local elections, replacing Down Area A which had existed since 1973, where it contained five wards (Crossgar, Derryboy, Killyleagh, Kilmore and Saintfield). For the 2014 local elections it gained Ballynahinch from the abolished Ballynahinch DEA.

== Councillors ==
Election	Councillor (Party)	Councillor (Party)	Councillor (Party)	Councillor (Party)	Councillor (Party)
2023	Terry Andrews (SDLP)/ (Independent)	David Lee-Surginor (Alliance)	Tierna Kelly (Alliance)	Jonny Jackson (DUP)	Callum Bowsie (DUP)
December 2022 Co-Options	Terry Andrews (SDLP)/ (Independent)	David Lee-Surginor (Alliance)	Robert Burgess (UUP)	Jonny Jackson (DUP)	Callum Bowsie (DUP)
October 2022 Co-Option	Terry Andrews (SDLP)/ (Independent)	David Lee-Surginor (Alliance)	Robert Burgess (UUP)	Yvonne Moore (DUP)	Kathryn Owen (DUP)/ (Independent)
May 2022 Co-Option	Terry Andrews (SDLP)/ (Independent)	David Lee-Surginor (Alliance)	Robert Burgess (UUP)	William Walker (DUP)/ (Independent)	Kathryn Owen (DUP)/ (Independent)
February 2022 Defection	Terry Andrews (SDLP)/ (Independent)	Patrick Brown (Alliance)	Robert Burgess (UUP)	William Walker (DUP)/ (Independent)	Kathryn Owen (DUP)/ (Independent)
September 2021 Defection	Terry Andrews (SDLP)/ (Independent)	Patrick Brown (Alliance)	Robert Burgess (UUP)	William Walker (DUP)/ (Independent)	Kathryn Owen (DUP)/ (Independent)
June 2021 Defection	Terry Andrews (SDLP)/ (Independent)	Patrick Brown (Alliance)	Robert Burgess (UUP)	William Walker (DUP)/ (Independent)	Kathryn Owen (DUP)/ (Independent)
October 2019 Co-Option	Terry Andrews (SDLP)/ (Independent)	Patrick Brown (Alliance)	Robert Burgess (UUP)	William Walker (DUP)/ (Independent)	Kathryn Owen (DUP)/ (Independent)
2019	Terry Andrews (SDLP)/ (Independent)	Patrick Brown (Alliance)	Robert Burgess (UUP)	William Walker (DUP)/ (Independent)	Harry Harvey (DUP)
2014	Terry Andrews (SDLP)/ (Independent)	Patrick Brown (Alliance)	Robert Burgess (UUP)	William Walker (DUP)/ (Independent)	Harry Harvey (DUP)
2011	Terry Andrews (SDLP)/ (Independent)	Maria McCarthy (SDLP)	Robert Burgess (UUP)	William Walker (DUP)/ (Independent)	William Dick (DUP)
2005	Margaret Ritchie (SDLP)	Edward Rea (UUP)	Robert Burgess (UUP)	William Walker (DUP)/ (Independent)	William Dick (DUP)
2001	Margaret Ritchie (SDLP)	Edward Rea (UUP)	Robert Burgess (UUP)	Albert Colmer (UUP)	William Dick (DUP)
1997	Margaret Ritchie (SDLP)	Samuel Osborne (UUP)	William Biggerstaff (UUP)	Albert Colmer (UUP)	William Dick (DUP)
1993	Margaret Ritchie (SDLP)	Samuel Osborne (UUP)	William Biggerstaff (UUP)	Albert Colmer (UUP)	William Dick (DUP)
1989	Margaret Ritchie (SDLP)	Samuel Osborne (UUP)	William Biggerstaff (UUP)	Albert Colmer (UUP)	William Dick (DUP)
1985	Margaret Ritchie (SDLP)	Samuel Osborne (UUP)	William Biggerstaff (UUP)	Dermot Nesbitt (UUP)	William Dick (DUP)

== 2023 Election ==
2019: 2 x DUP, 1 x UUP, 1 x Alliance, 1 x SDLP

2023: 2 x DUP, 2 x Alliance, 1 x SDLP

2019–2023 Change: Alliance gain from UUP

Rowallane - 5 seats
Party	Candidate	FPv%	Count			
Party	Candidate	FPv%	1	2	3	4
DUP	Jonny Jackson*	17.60%	1,414			
SDLP	Terry Andrews*	16.42%	1,319	1,335	1,860	
DUP	Callum Bowsie*	16.57%	1,331	1,337	1,340	
Alliance	Tierna Kelly	12.01%	965	996	1,118	1,403
Alliance	David Lee-Surginor*	12.58%	1,011	1,056	1,199	1,347
UUP	Robert Burgess*	11.66%	937	1,018	1,021	1,024
Sinn Féin	Dermot Kennedy	10.78%	866	872		
UUP	Rachel Gracey	1.26%	101			
Green (NI)	Ali McColl	1.12%	90			
Electorate: 15,865 Valid: 8,034 (50.64%) Spoilt: 81 Quota: 1,340 Turnout: 8,115 (51.15%)

== 2019 Election ==
2014: 2 x DUP, 1 x Alliance, 1 x SDLP, 1 x UUP

2019: 2 x DUP, 1 x Alliance, 1 x SDLP, 1 x UUP

2014-2019 Change: No change

Rowallane - 5 seats
Party	Candidate	FPv%	Count					
Party	Candidate	FPv%	1	2	3	4	5	6
Alliance	Patrick Brown* †	18.60%	1,416					
SDLP	Terry Andrews*	15.57%	1,211	1,322				
DUP	Harry Harvey* ††	16.27%	1,265	1,270	1,275.28	1,329.28		
UUP	Robert Burgess*	10.81%	842	865	892.83	1,075.37	1,082.96	1,142.81
DUP	William Walker* ‡††	12.67%	985	989	994.5	1,037.04	1,058.43	1,073.65
UUP	Walter Lyons	8.58%	667	682	692.89	746.95	751.78	772.54
Sinn Féin	Marianne Cleary	8.00%	622	652	671.47	709.67	709.67	
Independent	Martyn Todd	6.13%	477	525	570.54			
Green (NI)	Emma Cairns	2.34%	182					
Aontú	Liam Mulhern	1.27%	99					
Electorate: 14,896 Valid: 7,766 (52.20%) Spoilt: 73 Quota: 1,296 Turnout: 7,839 (52.62%)

== 2014 Election ==
2011: 2 x DUP, 1 x UUP, 1 x SDLP, 1 x Independent

2014: 2 x DUP, 1 x UUP, 1 x SDLP, 1 x Alliance

2011-2014 Change: Alliance gain from Independent

Rowallane - 5 seats
Party	Candidate	FPv%	Count					
Party	Candidate	FPv%	1	2	3	4	5	6
SDLP	Terry Andrews*	19.02%	1,321					
UUP	Robert Burgess*	16.49%	1,145	1,153.45	1,202.45			
DUP	Harry Harvey	13.71%	952	958.89	982.54	1,139.1	1,144.1	1,148.1
DUP	Billy Walker*	13.58%	943	959.64	980.94	1,070.98	1,072.98	1,081.98
Alliance	Patrick Brown	7.34%	510	563.95	710.97	723.36	734.36	992.36
UUP	Walter Lyons*	9.68%	672	674.86	699.64	873.81	898.81	913.81
Sinn Féin	Eddie Hughes	7.95%	552	595.68	689.88	692.01	692.01	
TUV	Philip Hamilton	6.24%	433	437.81	456.46			
NI21	Alistair Straney	3.85%	267	275.19				
Independent	Mickey Coogan*	2.15%	149	160.31				
Electorate: 14,526 Valid: 6,944 (49.54%) Spoilt: 78 Quota: 1,158 Turnout: 7,022 (50.44%)

== 2011 Election ==
2005: 2 x DUP, 2 x UUP, 1 x SDLP

2011: 2 x DUP, 1 x UUP, 1 x SDLP, 1 x Independent

2005-2011 Change: Independent gain from UUP

Rowallane - 5 seats
Party	Candidate	FPv%	Count			
Party	Candidate	FPv%	1	2	3	4
DUP	William Dick*	17.21%	1,007			
SDLP	Maria McCarthy	13.82%	809	1,092		
UUP	Robert Burgess*	14.30%	837	840	969	982.26
DUP	William Walker*	15.72%	920	927	971	976.46
Independent	Terry Andrews	12.03%	704	763	884	976.04
UUP	Graham Furey	11.96%	700	705	761	764.9
Alliance	Patrick Brown	8.10%	474	491		
Sinn Féin	Catriona Mackel	4.89%	286			
SDLP	Patricia McKay	1.97%	115			
Electorate: 11,090 Valid: 5,852 (52.77%) Spoilt: 83 Quota: 976 Turnout: 5,935 (53.52%)

== 2005 Election ==
2001: 3 x UUP, 1 x DUP, 1 x SDLP

2005: 2 x UUP, 2 x DUP, 1 x SDLP

2001-2005 Change: DUP gain from UUP

Rowallane - 5 seats
Party	Candidate	FPv%	Count						
Party	Candidate	FPv%	1	2	3	4	5	6	7
DUP	William Dick*	20.91%	1,326						
SDLP	Margaret Ritchie*	17.43%	1,105						
UUP	Robert Burgess*	14.64%	928	961	975	975.72	979.76	1,065.76	
UUP	Edward Rea*	9.15%	580	589	610.2	612.12	621.12	690.6	1,067.6
DUP	William Walker	11.37%	721	913.8	921.2	921.56	926.6	940.8	1,027.24
SDLP	Patricia McKay	4.89%	310	310.8	342.8	376.56	592.04	716.04	772
UUP	Albert Colmer*	8.47%	537	560.4	570.6	572.12	575.2	649.84	
Alliance	Lorna Dunn	5.25%	333	333.8	415	416.64	439.8		
Sinn Féin	Mary Robb	4.94%	313	313	319	322.08			
Green (NI)	Philip Orr	2.95%	187	188					
Electorate: 10,330 Valid: 6,340 (61.37%) Spoilt: 89 Quota: 1,057 Turnout: 6,429 (62.24%)

== 2001 Election ==
1997: 3 x UUP, 1 x DUP, 1 x SDLP

2001: 3 x UUP, 1 x DUP, 1 x SDLP

1997-2001 Change: No change

Rowallane - 5 seats
Party	Candidate	FPv%	Count					
Party	Candidate	FPv%	1	2	3	4	5	6
SDLP	Margaret Ritchie*	21.00%	1,440					
DUP	William Dick*	17.47%	1,198					
UUP	Robert Burgess	16.23%	1,113	1,117.41	1,144.41			
UUP	Albert Colmer*	14.98%	1,027	1,035.4	1,051.24	1,058.71	1,262.71	
UUP	Edward Rea	10.62%	728	732.83	760.83	762.25	901.46	1,018.5
SDLP	Kathleen Stockton	4.07%	279	525.12	565.59	823.93	845.35	847.66
DUP	William Walker	8.74%	599	600.47	622.68	623.68		
Sinn Féin	Anthony Lacken	4.43%	304	319.96	322.96			
Independent	James Marks	2.46%	169	172.36				
Electorate: 10,464 Valid: 6,857 (65.53%) Spoilt: 142 Quota: 1,143 Turnout: 6,999 (66.89%)

== 1997 Election ==
1993: 3 x UUP, 1 x DUP, 1 x SDLP

1997: 3 x UUP, 1 x DUP, 1 x SDLP

1993-1997 Change: No change

Rowallane - 5 seats
Party	Candidate	FPv%	Count				
Party	Candidate	FPv%	1	2	3	4	5
SDLP	Margaret Ritchie*	19.44%	1,044				
UUP	Samuel Osborne*	15.76%	846	847.96	888.24	1,105.24	
DUP	William Dick*	15.09%	810	810.56	819.56	963.56	
UUP	Albert Colmer*	15.22%	817	817.84	865.26	899.26	
UUP	William Biggerstaff*	12.94%	695	695.28	734.28	801.56	925.56
SDLP	John Moffat	7.15%	384	516.58	584.82	602.52	605.52
Ind. Unionist	William Walker	9.70%	521	522.82	543.96		
Alliance	Barry Corscadden	4.69%	252	255.5			
Electorate: 10,036 Valid: 5,369 (53.50%) Spoilt: 78 Quota: 895 Turnout: 5,447 (54.27%)

== 1993 Election ==
1989: 3 x UUP, 1 x DUP, 1 x SDLP

1993: 3 x UUP, 1 x DUP, 1 x SDLP

1989-1993 Change: No change

Rowallane - 5 seats
Party	Candidate	FPv%	Count	
Party	Candidate	FPv%	1	2
UUP	Samuel Osborne*	22.80%	1,322	
SDLP	Margaret Ritchie*	20.20%	1,171	
UUP	Albert Colmer*	15.21%	882	1,067.36
UUP	William Biggerstaff*	16.42%	952	1,058.12
DUP	William Dick*	16.57%	961	1,017.56
SDLP	Hugh Flynn	8.80%	510	514.76
Electorate: 9,320 Valid: 5,798 (62.21%) Spoilt: 110 Quota: 967 Turnout: 5,908 (63.39%)

== 1989 Election ==
1985: 3 x UUP, 1 x DUP, 1 x SDLP

1989: 3 x UUP, 1 x DUP, 1 x SDLP

1985-1989 Change: No change

Rowallane - 5 seats
Party	Candidate	FPv%	Count				
Party	Candidate	FPv%	1	2	3	4	5
SDLP	Margaret Ritchie*	26.91%	1,509				
UUP	Samuel Osborne*	23.58%	1,322				
UUP	Albert Colmer	13.93%	781	915	1,104.9		
UUP	William Biggerstaff*	13.20%	740	892	969.4		
DUP	William Dick*	11.63%	652	678	717.3	779.1	1,013.1
Ind. Unionist	William Walker	6.26%	351	413	461.9	480.8	488.8
DUP	William Greer	4.49%	252	311	334.4	371.3	
Electorate: 8,574 Valid: 5,607 (65.40%) Spoilt: 106 Quota: 935 Turnout: 5,713 (66.63%)

== 1985 Election ==
1985: 3 x UUP, 1 x DUP, 1 x SDLP

Rowallane - 5 seats
Party	Candidate	FPv%	Count				
Party	Candidate	FPv%	1	2	3	4	5
UUP	Dermot Nesbitt*	22.75%	1,180				
UUP	Samuel Osborne*	20.59%	1,068				
UUP	William Biggerstaff	12.38%	642	877.44			
DUP	William Dick	14.42%	748	789.58	857.98	866.82	
SDLP	Margaret Ritchie	12.13%	629	636.29	639.41	639.67	1,146.67
DUP	Trevor Lennon	7.50%	389	413.03	539.75	542.83	547.83
SDLP	Oliver Flanagan	10.24%	531	532.62	535.98	536.14	
Electorate: 7,860 Valid: 5,187 (65.99%) Spoilt: 87 Quota: 865 Turnout: 5,274 (67.10%)
