= Billy Leonard =

Irish republican politician (born 1955)

Member of Coleraine Borough Council
- In office 5 May 2005 – 5 May 2011
- Preceded by: Eamon Mullan
- Succeeded by: Ciarán Archibald
- Constituency: Bann
- In office 7 June 2001 – 5 May 2005
- Preceded by: Barbara Dempsey
- Succeeded by: Maura Hickey
- Constituency: The Skerries

Member of the Northern Ireland Assembly for East Londonderry
- In office 7 January 2010 – 25 March 2011
- Preceded by: Francie Brolly
- Succeeded by: Cathal Ó hOisín

Personal details
- Born: 13 January 1955 (age 71) Lurgan, County Armagh, Northern Ireland
- Party: Independent Republican (since 2011)
- Other political affiliations: Sinn Féin (2004 - 2011); SDLP (Until 2004)
- Spouse: Valerie Leonard
- Children: 6

Billy Leonard (born 13 January 1955) is an Irish republican retired politician who was a Member of the Northern Ireland Assembly (MLA) for East Londonderry from 2010 to 2011. A former Social Democratic and Labour Party (SDLP) officeholder, he then joined Sinn Féin, but is now an Independent Republican.

== Background ==
Born in Lurgan to a Protestant family, Leonard is a former member of both the Royal Ulster Constabulary reserve and the Orange Order. He was also a Seventh-day Adventist lay preacher. His wife, Valerie, is a Roman Catholic from the Kilwilkie republican estate in Lurgan, and their children were raised in her faith.

== Career ==
In 2001, Leonard was elected in the Skerries area of Coleraine Borough Council as a representative of the SDLP, having joined them while studying political science at the University of Ulster, but left in 2004 to join Sinn Féin. He cited the SDLP's lack of emphasis on Irish unity for his departure from the party. He was the first Sinn Féin member of the council, and was re-elected in 2005 in the Bann area. He stood unsuccessfully for the party in East Londonderry at the 2005 general election, and in the constituency of the same name at the 2007 Northern Ireland Assembly election.

Leonard was nominated by Sinn Féin to succeed Francie Brolly on the latter's resignation as the Sinn Féin MLA for East Londonderry, and took office on 7 January 2010. In November 2010 it was announced that Leonard would not contest the 2011 Assembly election, so that he could devote his time to writing a book, Towards a United Ireland – an uncompleted journey.

Leonard stated that disagreements "over support arrangements for MLAs' wages and expenses" were the reason for his decision to leave Sinn Féin in 2011. A 2012 interview published in the Belfast Telegraph quoted Leonard as saying that the Provisional Irish Republican Army (IRA) still have a big say in the running of Sinn Féin. "The tentacles of the army still run throughout it", he said and stated that former republican prisoners still dominate the structures of the party.

Northern Ireland Assembly
| Preceded by Francie Brolly | MLA for Londonderry, East; 2010–2011 | Succeeded by Cathal Ó hOisín |
