= 2001 Down District Council election =

Local govt election in Northern Ireland

← 1997	7 June 2001	2005 →

All 23 seats to Down District Council 12 seats needed for a majority
	First party	Second party	Third party
Party	SDLP	UUP	Sinn Féin
Seats won	10	6	4
Seat change	▼2	0	▲2
	Fourth party	Fifth party	Sixth party
Party	DUP	Independent	NI Women's Coalition
Seats won	2	1	0
Seat change	0	▲1	▼1
- Party with the most votes by district.

Elections to Down District Council were held on 7 June 2001 on the same day as the other Northern Irish local government elections. The election used four district electoral areas to elect a total of 23 councillors.

== Election results ==
Down District Council Election Result 2001
Party	Seats	Gains	Losses	Net gain/loss	Seats %	Votes %	Votes	+/−
SDLP	10	0	2	▼2	43.5	41.2	12,308	▼4.8
UUP	6	0	0	0	26.1	21.8	6,507	▼2.3
Sinn Féin	4	2	0	▲2	17.4	17.2	5,156	▲9.6
DUP	2	0	0	0	8.7	14.3	4,276	▲2.4
Independent	1	1	0	▲1	4.3	5.1	1,521	▲5.1
Workers' Party	0	0	0	0	0.0	0.4	115	▼2.3

Note: "Votes" are the first preference votes.

== Districts summary ==
Results of the Down District Council election, 2001 by district
Ward	%	Cllrs	%	Cllrs	%	Cllrs	%	Cllrs	%	Cllrs	Total Cllrs
Ward	SDLP		UUP		Sinn Féin		DUP		Others		Total Cllrs
Ballynahinch	39.4	2	24.0	1	13.6	1	23.0	1	0.0	0	5
Downpatrick	52.7	4	9.3	1	21.1	1	2.4	0	14.5	1	7
Newcastle	44.6	3	15.7	1	27.6	2	9.0	0	3.1	0	6
Rowallane	25.1	1	41.8	3	4.4	0	26.2	1	2.5	0	5
Total	41.2	10	21.8	6	17.2	4	14.3	2	5.5	1	23

== Districts results ==
=== Ballynahinch ===
1997: 3 x SDLP, 1 x UUP, 1 x DUP
2001: 2 x SDLP, 1 x UUP, 1 x DUP, 1 x Sinn Féin
1997-2001 Change: Sinn Féin gain from SDLP

Ballynahinch - 5 seats
Party	Candidate	FPv%	Count					
Party	Candidate	FPv%	1	2	3	4	5	6
SDLP	Patrick Toman*	16.74%	1,150					
SDLP	Anne Marie McAleenan*	14.01%	962	965	1,456			
DUP	Jim Wells	12.55%	862	951	956	961	1,358	
Sinn Féin	Francis Branniff	13.64%	937	937	985	1,123	1,125	1,125.85
UUP	Harvey Bicker*	11.50%	790	839	855	902	1,022	1,125.7
UUP	John Cochrane	9.81%	674	778	789	817	911	1,018.95
DUP	William Alexander*	8.63%	593	640	644	649		
SDLP	Francis Casement*	8.62%	592	598				
UUP	John Reid	2.65%	182					
DUP	Alan McIlroy	1.83%	126					
Electorate: 9,997 Valid: 6,868 (68.70%) Spoilt: 137 Quota: 1,145 Turnout: 7,005 (70.07%)

=== Downpatrick ===
1997: 5 x SDLP, 1 x Sinn Féin, 1 x UUP
2001: 4 x SDLP, 1 x Sinn Féin, 1 x UUP, 1 x Independent
1997-2001 Change: Independent gain from SDLP

Downpatrick - 7 seats
Party	Candidate	FPv%	Count								
Party	Candidate	FPv%	1	2	3	4	5	6	7	8	9
Sinn Féin	Éamonn McConvey	13.61%	1,147								
SDLP	Peter Craig*	12.78%	1,077								
SDLP	Dermot Curran*	12.15%	1,024	1,028.64	1,041.54	1,060.54					
SDLP	John Doris*	10.11%	852	854.96	858.04	865.14	882.14	915.32	915.32	1,178.32	
SDLP	Ann Trainor	10.07%	849	853.8	855.06	861.1	876.12	890.22	891.22	1,118.22	
Independent	Raymond Blaney	9.91%	835	838.44	839.68	868.78	895.78	947.88	961.88	1,025.6	1,051.84
UUP	Jack McIlheron*	9.28%	782	782.32	782.44	791.52	805.52	809.52	962.6	970.84	976.58
Sinn Féin	Liam Johnston	7.51%	633	697.88	698.54	701.54	707.54	742.02	744.04	787.36	800.07
SDLP	Gerard Mahon*	4.79%	404	405.36	405.84	409.84	414.92	420.92	420.92		
SDLP	John Irvine	2.76%	233	234.92	235.42	236.44	241.52	252.76	252.76		
DUP	John Foster	2.41%	203	203.08	203.12	203.12	203.12	203.12			
Independent	Patrick O'Connor	2.05%	173	174.28	174.34	186.36	192.44				
Workers' Party	Desmond O'Hagan	1.36%	115	115.24	115.26	117.28					
Independent	Helen Honeyman	1.20%	101	101.08	101.38						
Electorate: 13,109 Valid: 8,428 (64.29%) Spoilt: 238 Quota: 1,054 Turnout: 8,666 (66.11%)

=== Newcastle ===
1997: 3 x SDLP, 1 x Sinn Féin, 1 x UUP, 1 x Women's Coalition
2001: 3 x SDLP, 2 x Sinn Féin, 1 x UUP
1997-2001 Change: Sinn Féin gain from Women's Coalition

Newcastle - 6 seats
Party	Candidate	FPv%	Count			
Party	Candidate	FPv%	1	2	3	4
SDLP	Eamon O'Neill*	16.92%	1,308			
UUP	Gerald Douglas*	15.67%	1,211			
Sinn Féin	Willie Clarke	15.05%	1,163			
SDLP	Carmel O'Boyle*	12.94%	1,000	1,087.84	1,143.84	
SDLP	Peter Fitzpatrick*	9.06%	700	774.08	824.2	1,163.2
Sinn Féin	Hugh McDowell*	12.57%	972	985.6	1,036.92	1,084.44
DUP	Stanley Priestley	8.99%	695	695.16	707.16	719.48
SDLP	Charles McGrath	5.67%	438	461.2	495.68	
Independent	David Allister	3.14%	243	246.2		
Electorate: 11,339 Valid: 7,730 (68.17%) Spoilt: 160 Quota: 1,105 Turnout: 7,890 (69.58%)

=== Rowallane ===
1997: 3 x UUP, 1 x DUP, 1 x SDLP
2001: 3 x UUP, 1 x DUP, 1 x SDLP
1997-2001 Change: No change

Rowallane - 5 seats
Party	Candidate	FPv%	Count					
Party	Candidate	FPv%	1	2	3	4	5	6
SDLP	Margaret Ritchie*	21.00%	1,440					
DUP	William Dick*	17.47%	1,198					
UUP	Robert Burgess	16.23%	1,113	1,117.41	1,144.41			
UUP	Albert Colmer*	14.98%	1,027	1,035.4	1,051.24	1,058.71	1,262.71	
UUP	Edward Rea	10.62%	728	732.83	760.83	762.25	901.46	1,018.5
SDLP	Kathleen Stockton	4.07%	279	525.12	565.59	823.93	845.35	847.66
DUP	William Walker	8.74%	599	600.47	622.68	623.68		
Sinn Féin	Anthony Lacken	4.43%	304	319.96	322.96			
Independent	James Marks	2.46%	169	172.36				
Electorate: 10,464 Valid: 6,857 (65.53%) Spoilt: 142 Quota: 1,143 Turnout: 6,999 (66.89%)
