= Erskine Holmes =

Politician in Northern Ireland

Joseph Erskine Holmes

Member of Belfast City Council
- In office 30 May 1973 – 18 May 1977

Personal details
- Born: February 1940 (age 86) Belfast, Northern Ireland
- Party: NILP, Independent
- Other political affiliations: British Labour Party, Northern Ireland Labour Representation Committee
- Education: Queen's University Belfast
- Occupation: Politician

Joseph Erskine Holmes (born February 1940) is a politician in Northern Ireland.

== Background ==
Holmes was educated at Annadale Grammar School and attended Queen's University Belfast. He chaired the Queen's University Labour Group in the early 1960s, serving alongside Michael Farrell and Eamonn McCann. On graduating, he became a teacher, and stood for the Northern Ireland Labour Party (NILP) in several elections.

For Westminster, Holmes stood in Belfast South at the 1966, taking 34.6% and second place, the NILP's best ever result in the seat. At the 1970 general election, he instead stood in Armagh, then back in Belfast South at the February and October 1974 general elections. He also stood in Belfast Ballynafeigh at the 1965 and 1969 Northern Ireland general elections, and Belfast South for the 1973 Northern Ireland Assembly election and Northern Ireland Constitutional Convention.

Holmes was a supporter of the civil rights movement, and served on the committee of the Northern Ireland Civil Rights Association. In 1971/2, Holmes served as chairman of the NILP, during which time he debated the party's attitude towards internment, and was known for his support of proportional representation. For part of the 1970s, he worked as full-time organiser of the NILP.

Holmes was elected to Belfast City Council at the 1973 Northern Ireland local elections in Belfast Area A, but did not defend his seat in 1977.

By the 1990 Upper Bann by-election, the NILP had been disbanded, and Holmes stood as an independent candidate, campaigning for the "right to vote Labour". By the early 1970s, he ran the Northern Ireland Federation of Housing Associations, and he also has a long involvement with the co-operative movement, as founder of the NI Co-ownership Society and NI Assembly All Party Co-operative Group, and chairman of the Co-operative Press.

When the British Labour Party began admitting members in Northern Ireland, Holmes joined. However, the party refused to stand any candidates in the region, and in 2016 Holmes was part of a group which founded the Northern Ireland Labour Representation Committee, a parallel group with the primary purpose of contesting elections, becoming its nominating officer. He stood for the committee in Belfast East at the 2016 Northern Ireland Assembly election.

Party political offices
Preceded by Brian Anderson	Chairman of the Northern Ireland Labour Party; 1971–1972	Succeeded by Brian Garrett
