= Cathal Ó hOisín =

Irish Sinn Féin politician (born 1963)

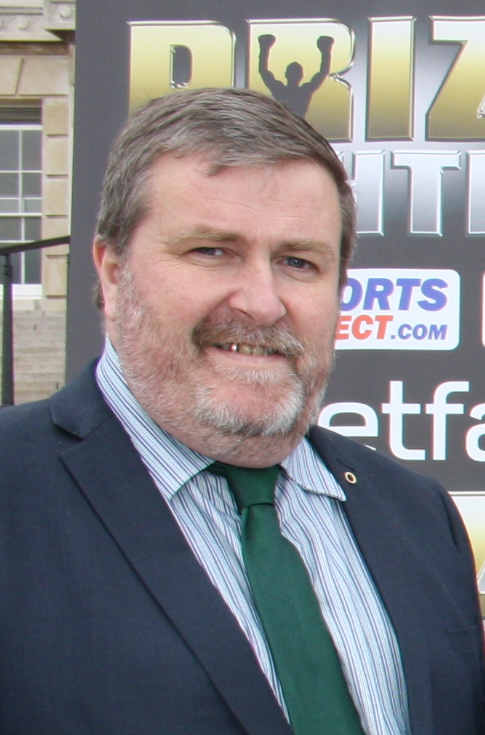

Member of the Northern Ireland Assembly for East Londonderry
- In office 5 May 2011 – 5 May 2016
- Preceded by: Billy Leonard
- Succeeded by: Caoimhe Archibald

Member of Limavady Borough Council
- In office 5 May 2005 – 5 May 2011
- Preceded by: Francie Brolly
- Succeeded by: Tony McCaul
- Constituency: Benbradagh

Personal details
- Born: 18 March 1963 (age 63) Dungiven, Northern Ireland
- Party: Sinn Féin
- Website: Cathal Ó hOisín MLA

Cathal Ó hOisín is a former Irish Sinn Féin politician who was a Member of the Northern Ireland Assembly (MLA) for East Londonderry from 2011 to 2016.

== Background ==
Ó hOisín was educated at St. Patrick's College, Maghera and Magee College, Derry. He was first elected to Limavady Borough Council at the 2005 local elections for the Benbradagh electoral area. He served as Mayor of Limavady from 2009 to 2010. At the 2010 general election, he stood unsuccessfully in East Londonderry, taking second place with 19.3% of the vote.

He lost his Assembly seat to party running mate, Caoimhe Archibald, at the 2016 Assembly election. He unsuccessfully attempted to regain his former seat at the Assembly election the following year.

Northern Ireland Assembly
| Preceded by Billy Leonard | MLA for East Londonderry; 2011–2016 | Succeeded by Caoimhe Archibald |
