= 2016 Northern Ireland Assembly election =

- 5 May 2016

All 108 seats to the Northern Ireland Assembly
- Turnout: 54.9% (▼0.8%)
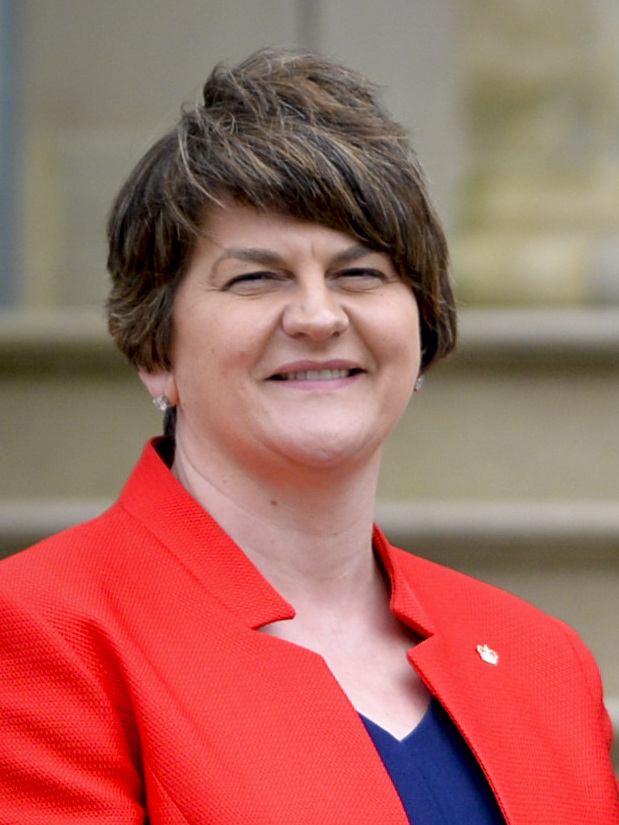

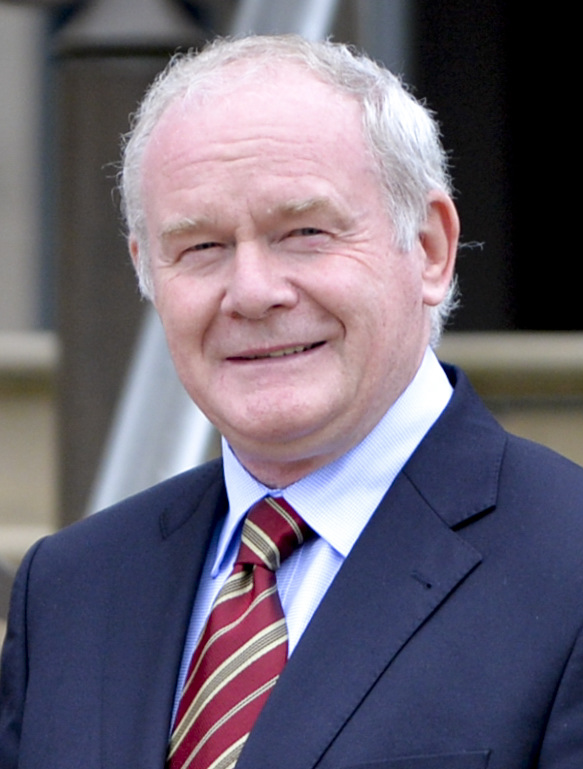

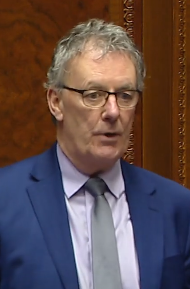

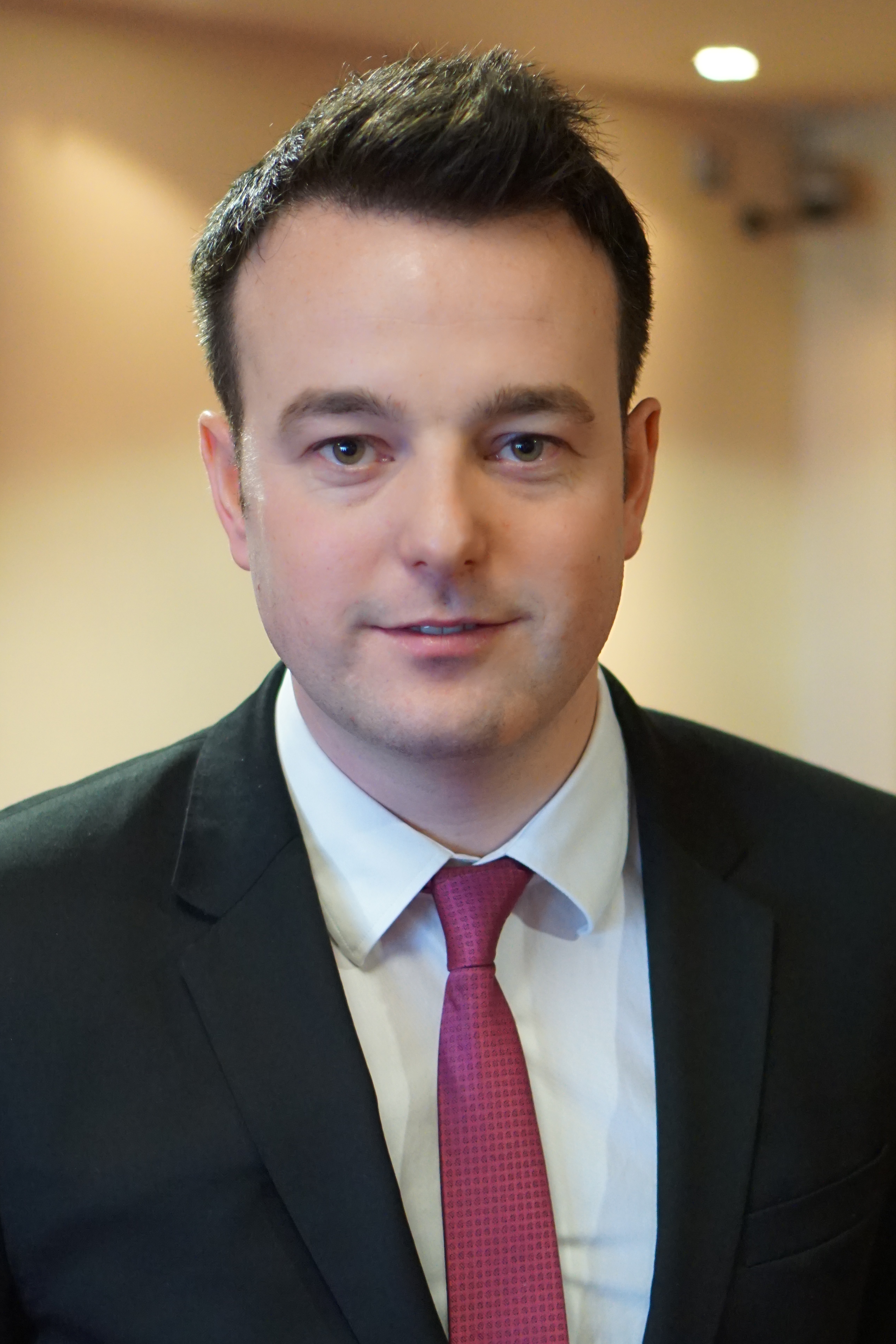

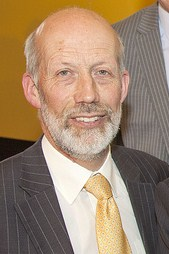

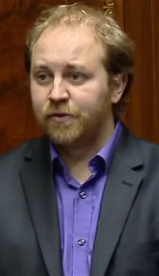

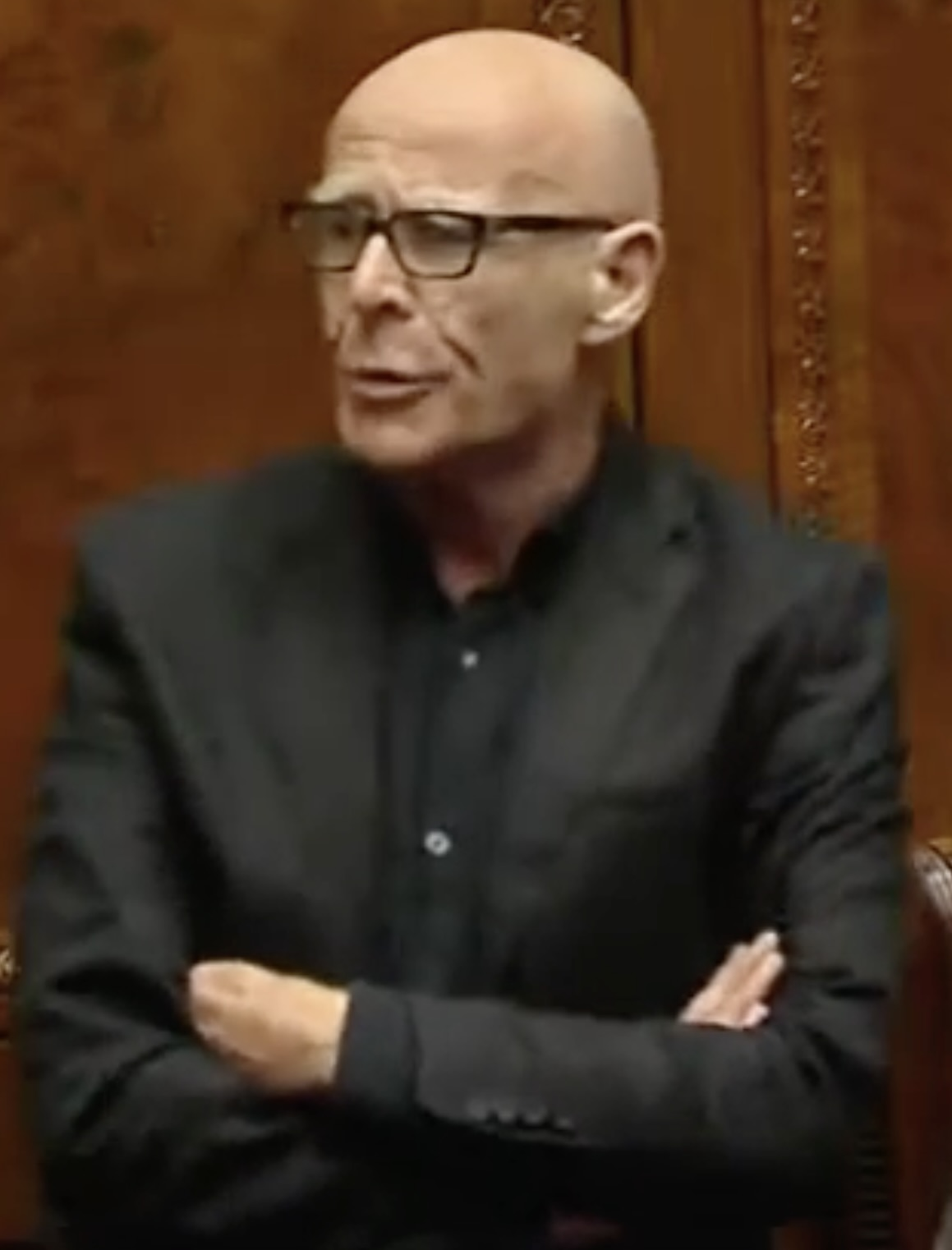

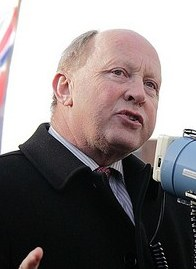
| | First party | Second party | Third party |
|---|---|---|---|
| Leader | Arlene Foster | Martin McGuinness (Note: Sinn Féin's president at the time was Gerry Adams; however he already held a seat in the Republic of Ireland. McGuinness was Sinn Féin's "party leader in the North".) | Mike Nesbitt |
| Party | DUP | Sinn Féin | UUP |
| Leader since | 17 December 2015 | 8 May 2007 | 31 March 2012 |
| Leader's seat | Fermanagh and South Tyrone | Foyle | Strangford |
| Last election | 38 seats, 30.0% | 29 seats, 26.9% | 16 seats, 13.2% |
| Seats before | 38 | 28 | 13 |
| Seats won | 38 | 28 | 16 |
| Seat change | Steady | ▼1 | Steady |
| Popular vote | 202,567 | 166,785 | 87,302 |
| Percentage | 29.2% | 24.0% | 12.6% |
| Swing | ▼0.8% | ▼2.9% | ▼0.6% |
| | Fourth party | Fifth party | Sixth party |
| Leader | Colum Eastwood | David Ford | Steven Agnew |
| Party | SDLP | Alliance | Green (NI) |
| Leader since | 14 November 2015 | 6 October 2001 | 10 January 2011 |
| Leader's seat | Foyle | South Antrim | North Down |
| Last election | 14 seats, 14.2% | 8 seats, 7.7% | 1 seat, 0.9% |
| Seats before | 14 | 8 | 1 |
| Seats won | 12 | 8 | 2 |
| Seat change | ▼2 | Steady | ▲1 |
| Popular vote | 83,364 | 48,447 | 18,718 |
| Percentage | 12.0% | 7.0% | 2.7% |
| Swing | ▼2.2% | ▼0.7% | ▲1.8% |
| | Seventh party | Eighth party |
| Leader | Eamonn McCann | Jim Allister |
| Party | People Before Profit | TUV |
| Leader since | N/A | 7 December 2007 |
| Leader's seat | Foyle | North Antrim |
| Last election | 0 seats, 0.8% | 1 seat, 2.4% |
| Seats before | 0 | 1 |
| Seats won | 2 | 1 |
| Seat change | ▲2 | Steady |
| Popular vote | 13,761 | 23,776 |
| Percentage | 2.0% | 3.4% |
| Swing | ▲1.2% | ▲1.0% |
- Election results. Voters elect 6 assembly members from the 18 constituencies.
First Minister and
deputy First Minister before election
Arlene Foster (DUP) &
Martin McGuinness (SF)
First Minister and
deputy First Minister
after election
Arlene Foster (DUP) &
Martin McGuinness (SF)

The 2016 Northern Ireland Assembly election was held on Thursday, 5 May 2016. It was the fifth election to take place since the devolved assembly was established in 1998. 1,281,595 individuals were registered to vote in the election (representing an increase of 5.9% compared to the previous Assembly election). Turnout in the 2016 Assembly election was 703,744 (54.9%), a decline of less than one percentage point from the previous Assembly Election in 2011, but down 15 percentage points from the first election to the Assembly held in 1998.

As in the 2007 and 2011 elections, the Democratic Unionist Party and Sinn Féin won the most seats, with the DUP winning 38 and Sinn Féin winning 28 of the available 108 seats. The Ulster Unionist Party won 16 seats, the Social Democratic and Labour Party 12 and the Alliance 8, while two seats were won by the Green Party and People Before Profit. The Traditional Unionist Voice and an independent candidate each won one seat.

== Change of date ==
Under the Northern Ireland Act 1998, elections to the Assembly were originally for a four-year term; thus there would have been an election due in May 2015, four years after the 2011 election. Following the introduction of the UK Fixed Term Parliaments Act, this date would have clashed with the 2015 UK general election. The Scottish Parliament and Welsh Assembly elections were postponed for a year to 2016 to avoid this clash.

In May 2013, Theresa Villiers, Secretary of State for Northern Ireland, announced the next Assembly election would be postponed to May 2016, and would be held at fixed intervals of five years thereafter. Section 7 of the Northern Ireland (Miscellaneous Provisions) Act 2014 specifies that elections will be held on the first Thursday in May on the fifth (rather than fourth, as previously) calendar year following that in which its predecessor was elected.

== End of dual mandate ==
The Northern Ireland (Miscellaneous Provisions) Act 2014 also ends the practice of dual mandate, prohibiting someone being elected to the assembly who is also a member of the House of Commons or Dáil Éireann. At the time the Act was passed, there were three such dual-members: the DUP's Sammy Wilson (MP for East Antrim and MLA for East Antrim) and Gregory Campbell (MP for East Londonderry and MLA for East Londonderry) and the SDLP's Alasdair McDonnell (MP for Belfast South and MLA for Belfast South). Wilson and McDonnell resigned from the Assembly after being re-elected to the House of Commons in the 2015 election. Campbell, who was also re-elected as an MP, is retiring from the Assembly at this election.

== Earlier dissolution ==
There are several circumstances in which the Assembly could be dissolved before the date scheduled by virtue of section 31(1) of the Northern Ireland Act 1998.

=== Dissolution motion ===
Under section 32 of the 1998 Act, the Assembly can be dissolved if a resolution to such an effect is passed by the Assembly, with support of a two-thirds majority or more members.

=== Failure to elect the First or deputy First Ministers ===
The Act provides that if the Assembly fails to elect either the First Minister or deputy First Minister within six weeks, an election is called. Since the enactment of the Northern Ireland (St Andrews Agreement) Act 2006, the First Minister has been nominated by the largest party of the largest community designation, and the deputy First Minister has been nominated by the largest party in the second largest community designation ("Nationalist", "Unionist" or "Other").

=== New Executive Departments ===
It was proposed that after the May 2016 Election there be a reduction in the number of ministries and departments. The amendments were:

- The Office of the First Minister and deputy First Minister is renamed the Executive Office
- The Department of Agriculture and Rural Development is renamed the Department of Agriculture, Environment and Rural Affairs
- The Department of Enterprise, Trade and Investment is renamed the Department for the Economy
- The Department of Finance and Personnel is renamed the Department of Finance
- The Department of Health, Social Services and Public Safety is renamed the Department of Health
- The Department for Regional Development is renamed the Department for Infrastructure
- The Department for Social Development is renamed the Department for Communities
- The Department of Justice remains unchanged Department of Justice (Northern Ireland)
- The Department of Culture, Arts and Leisure is dissolved
- The Department of the Environment is dissolved
- The Department for Employment and Learning is dissolved

° The Department of Education remains the same.

== Candidates ==
Nominations opened on 30 March 2016 for the assembly election. A full list of candidates is available. The table below lists all of the nominated candidates.

- * indicates an incumbent MLA
- ** indicates the candidate was the incumbent MLA for a different constituency
- Leaders of parties represented in the assembly at dissolution are shown in **bold text**
- Elected candidates are marked with an (E)

| Constituency | DUP | SF | SDLP | UUP | Alliance | TUV | Green | PBP | UKIP | NI Cons | Independent | Others |
|---|---|---|---|---|---|---|---|---|---|---|---|---|
| Belfast East | Joanne Bunting (E); Sammy Douglas* (E); Robin Newton* (E) | Niall Ó Donnghaile | Amy Doherty | Andy Allen* (E); Chris McGimpsey | Naomi Long (E); Chris Lyttle* (E); Tim Morrow | Andrew Girvin | Ross Brown | | Jonny Lavery | Neil Wilson | Maggie Hutton | Courtney Robinson (Lab Alt); Erskine Holmes (NI Lab); John Kyle (PUP) |
| Belfast North | Paula Bradley* (E); William Humphrey* (E); Nelson McCausland* (E) | Gerry Kelly* (E); Carál Ní Chuilín* (E) | Nichola Mallon (E) | Lesley Carroll | Nuala McAllister | John Miller | Mal O'Hara | Fiona Ferguson | Ken Boyle | | Fra Hughes; Tom Burns | Abdo Thabeth (NI Lab); Geoff Dowey; Billy Hutchinson (PUP); Gemma Weir (WP) |
| Belfast South | Emma Little-Pengelly* (E); Christopher Stalford (E) | Máirtín Ó Muilleoir* (E) | Claire Hanna* (E); Fearghal McKinney | Rodney McCune | Paula Bradshaw (E); Duncan Morrow | John Hiddleston | Clare Bailey (E) | | Bob Stoker | Ben Manton | Ruth Patterson | Seán Burns (Lab Alt); Brigitte Anton (NI Lab); Ian Shanks (PUP); William Dickson; Lily Kerr (WP) |
| Belfast West | Frank McCoubrey | Alex Maskey* (E); Pat Sheehan* (E); Fra McCann* (E); Jennifer McCann* (E); Rosie McCorley | Alex Attwood* (E) | Gareth Martin | Jemima Higgins | | Ellen Murray | Gerry Carroll (E) | | | | Conor Campbell (WP) |
| East Antrim | David Hilditch* (E); Gordon Lyons* (E); Alastair Ross* (E) | Oliver McMullan* (E) | Margaret Anne McKillop | Roy Beggs Jr* (E); John Stewart; Maureen Morrow | Stewart Dickson* (E); Danny Donnelly | Ruth Wilson | Dawn Patterson | | Noel Jordan | | | Conor Sheridan (Lab Alt); Jim McCaw (PUP) |
| East Londonderry | Maurice Bradley (E); George Robinson* (E); Adrian McQuillan* (E) | Caoimhe Archibald (E); Cathal Ó hOisín | Gerry Mullan (E) | William McCandless; Aaron Callan | Yvonne Boyle | Jordan Armstrong | Amber Hamill | | Steven Parkhill | David Harding; Stuart Canning | Claire Sugden* (E); Victor Christie | Russell Watton (PUP) |
| Fermanagh and South Tyrone | **Arlene Foster*** (E); Maurice Morrow* (E) | Michelle Gildernew (E); Seán Lynch* (E); John Feely; Phil Flanagan | Richie McPhillips (E) | Rosemary Barton (E); Alastair Patterson | Kerri Blyberg | Donald Crawford | Tanya Jones | | | | | Damien Harris (NI Lab) |
| Foyle | Gary Middleton* (E) | Raymond McCartney* (E); **Martin McGuinness**** (E); Maeve McLaughlin | Mark H. Durkan* (E); **Colum Eastwood*** (E); Gerard Diver | Julia Kee | Chris McCaw | | Mary Hassan | **Eamonn McCann** (E) | | Alan Dunlop | Anne McCloskey; Maurice Devenney; Kathleen Bradley | John Lindsay (CISTA) |
| Lagan Valley | Paul Givan* (E); Edwin Poots* (E); Brenda Hale* (E); Jonathan Craig | Jacqui McGeough | Pat Catney | Robbie Butler (E); Jenny Palmer (E) | Trevor Lunn* (E) | Lyle Rea | Dan Barrios-O'Neill | | Brian Higginson | Jack Irwin | Jonny Orr | Frazer McCammond; Peter Dynes (NI Lab) |
| Mid Ulster | Keith Buchanan (E); Ian McCrea | Ian Milne* (E); Michelle O'Neill* (E); Linda Dillon (E) | Patsy McGlone* (E) | Sandra Overend* (E) | Néidín Hendron | Hannah Loughrin | Stefan Taylor | | Alan Day | | | Hugh Scullion (WP) |
| Newry and Armagh | William Irwin* (E) | Megan Fearon* (E); Cathal Boylan* (E); Conor Murphy* (E) | Justin McNulty (E); Karen McKevitt | Danny Kennedy* (E); Sam Nicholson | Craig Weir | | Michael Watters | | Alan Love | | Paul Berry; Martin McAllister | Emmet Crossan (CISTA) |
| North Antrim | Paul Frew* (E); Mervyn Storey* (E); Phillip Logan (E); David McIlveen | Daithí McKay* (E) | Connor Duncan | Robin Swann* (E); Andrew Wright | Stephen McFarland | **Jim Allister*** (E); Timothy Gaston | Jennifer Breslin | | Donna Anderson | James Simpson | | Kathryn Johnston (NI Lab) |
| North Down | Alex Easton* (E); Gordon Dunne* (E); Peter Weir* (E) | Therese McCartney | Conal Browne | Alan Chambers (E); Carl McClean; Chris Eisenstadt | Stephen Farry* (E); Andrew Muir | John Brennan | **Steven Agnew*** (E) | | Bill Piper | Frank Shivers | Brian Wilson | Maria Lourenco (NI Lab) |
| South Antrim | Paul Girvan* (E); Pam Cameron* (E); Trevor Clarke* (E) | Declan Kearney (E) | Roisin Lynch | Steve Aiken (E); Paul Michael; Adrian Cochrane-Watson | **David Ford*** (E) | Richard Cairns | Helen Farley | | Robert Hill | Mark Young | David McMaster | |
| South Down | Jim Wells* (E) | Chris Hazzard* (E); Caitríona Ruane* (E); Michael Gray-Sloan | Sinéad Bradley (E); Colin McGrath (E); Seán Rogers | Harold McKee (E) | Patrick Brown | Henry Reilly | John Hardy | | | | John McCallister | |
| Strangford | Michelle McIlveen* (E); Jonathan Bell* (E); Simon Hamilton* (E); Harry Harvey | Dermot Kennedy | Joe Boyle | **Mike Nesbitt*** (E); Philip Smith (E) | Kellie Armstrong (E) | Stephen Cooper | Georgia Grainger | | Stephen Crosby | Bill McKendry | Jimmy Menagh; Rab McCartney | |
| Upper Bann | Carla Lockhart (E); Sydney Anderson* (E) | Catherine Seeley (E); John O'Dowd* (E) | Dolores Kelly | Jo-Anne Dobson* (E); Doug Beattie (E); Kyle Savage | Harry Hamilton | Roy Ferguson | Simon Lee | | David Jones | Ian Nickels | Steven McCarroll | Martin Kelly (CISTA); Emma Hutchinson (NI Lab); Sophie Long (PUP) |
| West Tyrone | Thomas Buchanan* (E); Allan Bresland | Barry McElduff* (E); Michaela Boyle* (E); Declan McAleer* (E); Grace McDermott | Daniel McCrossan* (E) | Ross Hussey* (E) | Stephen Donnelly | | Ciaran McClean | | | Roger Lomas | Josephine Deehan; Sorcha McAnespy; Patsy Kelly; Corey French; Susan-Anne White | Laura McAnea (AWP); Barry Brown (CISTA) |

== Members not seeking re-election ==
=== Alliance ===
- Judith Cochrane (Belfast East)
- Anna Lo (Belfast South)
- Kieran McCarthy (Strangford)

=== DUP ===
- Gregory Campbell (East Londonderry)
- Stephen Moutray (Upper Bann)
- Peter Robinson (Belfast East)

=== NI21 ===
- Basil McCrea (Lagan Valley)

=== SDLP ===
- Dominic Bradley (Newry and Armagh)
- John Dallat (East Londonderry)
- Alban Maginness (Belfast North)

=== Sinn Féin ===
- Bronwyn McGahan (Fermanagh and South Tyrone)
- Mitchel McLaughlin (South Antrim)

=== UUP ===
- Leslie Cree (North Down)
- Sam Gardiner (Upper Bann)
- Michael McGimpsey (Belfast South)

=== UKIP ===
- David McNarry (Strangford)

== Results ==
Result by constituencies

The 2016 election was held using STV and 18 multi-seat districts, each electing 6 members.

| Party | Votes | % | +/– | Seats | | | |
| Party | Votes | % | +/– | Assembly | +/– | Executive | +/– |
|---|---|---|---|---|---|---|---|
| Democratic Unionist Party | 202,567 | 29.18 | -0.8 | 38 | – | 5 | +1 |
| Sinn Féin | 166,785 | 24.02 | -2.9 | 28 | -1 | 4 | +1 |
| Ulster Unionist Party | 87,302 | 12.57 | -0.6 | 16 | – | – | -1 |
| Social Democratic and Labour Party | 83,368 | 12.01 | -2.2 | 12 | -2 | – | -1 |
| Alliance Party of Northern Ireland | 48,447 | 6.98 | -0.7 | 8 | – | – | -1 |
| Traditional Unionist Voice | 23,776 | 3.42 | +1.0 | 1 | – | – | – |
| Green Party in Northern Ireland | 18,718 | 2.70 | +1.8 | 2 | +1 | – | – |
| People Before Profit Alliance | 13,761 | 1.98 | +1.2 | 2 | +2 | – | – |
| United Kingdom Independence Party | 10,109 | 1.46 | +0.8 | – | – | – | – |
| Progressive Unionist Party | 5,955 | 0.86 | +0.3 | – | – | – | – |
| Northern Ireland Conservatives | 2,554 | 0.37 | New | – | – | – | – |
| Cannabis Is Safer Than Alcohol | 2,510 | 0.36 | New | – | – | – | – |
| Cross-Community Labour Alternative | 1,939 | 0.28 | New | – | – | – | – |
| Northern Ireland Labour Representation Committee | 1,577 | 0.23 | New | – | – | – | – |
| Workers' Party (Ireland) | 1,565 | 0.23 | New | – | – | – | – |
| South Belfast Unionists | 351 | 0.05 | New | – | – | – | – |
| Animal Welfare Party | 224 | 0.03 | New | – | – | – | – |
| Democracy First | 124 | 0.02 | New | – | – | – | – |
| Northern Ireland First | 32 | 0.00 | New | – | – | – | – |
| Independent | 22,650 | 3.26 | +0.9 | 1 | – | 1 | +1 |
| Total | 694,314 | 100.00 | – | 108 | 0 | 10 | 0 |
| Valid votes | 694,314 | 98.66 | | | | | |
| Invalid/blank votes | 9,430 | 1.34 | | | | | |
| Total votes | 703,744 | 100.00 | | | | | |
| Registered voters/turnout | 1,281,595 | 54.91 | | | | | |
Source: Election Report: Northern Ireland Assembly Election 5 May 2016

=== Distribution of seats by constituency ===
Party affiliation of the six Assembly members returned by each constituency. The first column indicates the party of the Member of the House of Commons (MP) returned by the corresponding parliamentary constituency in the general election of 7 May 2015 (under the "first past the post" method).

(The constituencies are arranged here in rough geographical order around Lough Neagh from Antrim to Londonderry. To see them in alphabetical order, click the small square icon after "Constituency"; to restore this geographical order, click the icon after "No." at the left.)

| No. | 2015 MP | Constituency | Candi- dates | Total seats | PBP | Green | Sinn Féin | SDLP | Alli- ance | UUP | DUP | TUV | Ind. | Seat gained by | Seat formerly held by |
|---|---|---|---|---|---|---|---|---|---|---|---|---|---|---|---|
| 1 | DUP | North Antrim | - | 6 | - | - | 1 | - | - | 1 | 3 | 1 | - | - | - |
| 2 | DUP | East Antrim | - | 6 | - | - | 1 | - | 1 | 1 | 3 | - | - | - | - |
| 3 | UUP | South Antrim | - | 6 | - | - | 1 | - | 1 | 1 | 3 | - | - | - | - |
| 4 | DUP | Belfast North | - | 6 | - | - | 2 | 1 | - | - | 3 | - | - | - | - |
| 5 | SF | Belfast West | - | 6 | 1 | - | 4 | 1 | - | - | - | - | - | PBP | SF |
| 6 | SDLP | Belfast South | - | 6 | - | 1 | 1 | 1 | 1 | - | 2 | - | - | Green DUP | SDLP UUP |
| 7 | DUP | Belfast East | - | 6 | - | - | - | - | 2 | 1 | 3 | - | - | - | - |
| 8 | Ind. | North Down | - | 6 | - | 1 | - | - | 1 | 1 | 3 | - | - | - | - |
| 9 | DUP | Strangford | - | 6 | - | - | - | - | 1 | 2 | 3 | - | - | - | - |
| 10 | DUP | Lagan Valley | - | 6 | - | - | - | - | 1 | 2 | 3 | - | - | UUP | DUP |
| 11 | DUP | Upper Bann | - | 6 | - | - | 2 | - | - | 2 | 2 | - | - | SF | SDLP |
| 12 | SDLP | South Down | - | 6 | - | - | 2 | 2 | - | 1 | 1 | - | - | - | - |
| 13 | SF | Newry and Armagh | - | 6 | - | - | 3 | 1 | - | 1 | 1 | - | - | - | - |
| 14 | UUP | Fermanagh & South Tyrone | - | 6 | - | - | 2 | 1 | - | 1 | 2 | - | - | SDLP | SF |
| 15 | SF | West Tyrone | - | 6 | - | - | 3 | 1 | - | 1 | 1 | - | - | - | - |
| 16 | SF | Mid Ulster | - | 6 | - | - | 3 | 1 | - | 1 | 1 | - | - | - | - |
| 17 | SDLP | Foyle | - | 6 | 1 | - | 2 | 2 | - | - | 1 | - | - | PBP | SDLP |
| 18 | DUP | East Londonderry | - | 6 | - | - | 1 | 1 | - | - | 3 | - | 1 | - | - |
| 18 | | Total | - | 108 | 2 | 2 | 28 | 12 | 8 | 16 | 38 | 1 | 1 | | |
| | | Change since dissolution | - | - | +2 | +1 | –1 | –2 | - | +3 | - | - | –1 | –1 | –1 |
| | | Assembly at dissolution | - | 108 | - | 1 | 29 | 14 | 8 | 13 | 38 | 1 | 2 | 1 UKIP | 1 NI21 |
| | | Change during Assembly term | - | - | - | - | - | - | - | –3 | - | - | +1 | +1 | +1 |
| | | Elected on 5 May 2011 | 218 | 108 | - | 1 | 29 | 14 | 8 | 16 | 38 | 1 | 1 | - | |
| | | Elected on 7 March 2007 | 256 | 108 | - | 1 | 28 | 16 | 7 | 18 | 36 | - | 1 | 1 Prog. U. | |
| | | Elected on 23 November 2003 | | 108 | - | - | 24 | 18 | 6 | 27 | 30 | - | 1 | 1 Prog. U. | 1 UKUP |
| | | Elected on 25 June 1998 | | 108 | - | - | 18 | 24 | 6 | 28 | 20 | - | 4 | 2 Prog. U. | 5 UKUP, 2 NIWC |

- Three of the four independents elected in 1998 ran as Independent Unionists
- NIWC = Northern Ireland Women's Coalition; Prog. U. = Progressive Unionist Party; TUV = Traditional Unionist Voice; UKUP = United Kingdom Unionist Party

=== Share of first-preference votes ===
Percentage of each constituency's first-preference votes. Four highest percentages in each constituency shaded; absolute majorities underlined. The constituencies are arranged in the geographic order described for the table above; click the icon next to "Constituency" to see them in alphabetical order.

- [The totals given here are the sum of all valid ballots cast in each constituency, and the percentages are based on such totals. The turnout percentages in the last column, however, are based upon all ballots cast, which also include anything from twenty to a thousand invalid ballots in each constituency. The total valid ballots' percentage of the eligible electorate can correspondingly differ by 0.1% to 2% from the turnout percentage.]

| No. | 2015 MP | MP's % of 2015 vote | Constituency | PBP | Green | Sinn Féin | SDLP | Alli- ance | UUP | DUP | TUV | Ind. | Others. | Total votes | Eligible elector- ate | Turn- out % |
|---|---|---|---|---|---|---|---|---|---|---|---|---|---|---|---|---|
| 1 | DUP | 43.2% | North Antrim | | 1.3 | 12.9 | 7.5 | 3.2 | 10.7 | 43.1 | 17.9 | | 3.3 | - | - | 52.3% |
| 2 | DUP | 36.1% | East Antrim | | 2.1 | 8.1 | 3.8 | 14.6 | 20.2 | 36.1 | 5.1 | | 9.9 | - | - | 50.5% |
| 3 | UUP | 32.7% | South Antrim | | 1.7 | 13.2 | 9.6 | 8.9 | 22.2 | 37.5 | 3.8 | 1.4 | 1.7 | - | - | 50.4% |
| 4 | DUP | 47.0% | Belfast North | 3.5 | 2.2 | 26.5 | 10.6 | 7.0 | 5.4 | 35.0 | 1.8 | 0.9 | 7.1 | - | - | 51.6% |
| 5 | SF | 54.2% | Belfast West | 22.9 | 0.9 | 54.5 | 7.3 | 0.8 | 1.8 | 10.4 | | | 1.5 | - | - | 56.7% |
| 6 | SDLP | 24.5% | Belfast South | | 9.6 | 14.2 | 20.0 | 16.4 | 6.7 | 22.0 | 1.3 | 1.3 | 8.5 | - | - | 53.6% |
| 7 | DUP | 49.3% | Belfast East | | 5.9 | 2.5 | 0.4 | 28.7 | 11.1 | 36.7 | 2.4 | 3.0 | 9.4 | - | - | 56.5% |
| 8 | Ind. | 49.2% | North Down | | 12.7 | 1.0 | 1.3 | 16.8 | 15.5 | 41.7 | 1.9 | 4.4 | 4.7 | - | - | 49.0% |
| 9 | DUP | 44.4% | Strangford | | 2.8 | 2.0 | 8.3 | 10.7 | 19.5 | 43.0 | 4.3 | 5.9 | 3.4 | - | - | 49.7% |
| 10 | DUP | 47.9% | Lagan Valley | | 2.9 | 2.7 | 7.5 | 9.5 | 21.2 | 47.2 | 3.3 | 2.1 | 3.6 | - | - | 52.7% |
| 11 | DUP | 32.7% | Upper Bann | | 1.1 | 24.9 | 9.5 | 3.1 | 21.6 | 31.1 | 2.6 | 0.1 | 6.0 | - | - | 53.6% |
| 12 | SDLP | 42.3% | South Down | | 2.0 | 31.1 | 31.4 | 5.4 | 8.5 | 12.3 | 6.6 | 2.8 | | - | - | 53.1% |
| 13 | SF | 41.1% | Newry & Armagh | | 0.7 | 40.9 | 18.2 | 1.0 | 14.1 | 16.7 | | 5.5 | 2.9 | - | - | 58.4% |
| 14 | UUP | 46.4% | Fermanagh & S. Tyrone | | 1.9 | 40.0 | 8.5 | 1.1 | 12.8 | 32.7 | 2.5 | | 0.6 | - | - | 63.5% |
| 15 | SF | 43.5% | West Tyrone | | 1.2 | 42.0 | 11.0 | 1.3 | 11.4 | 22.0 | | 8.9 | 2.1 | - | - | 59.1% |
| 16 | SF | 48.7% | Mid Ulster | | 0.9 | 46.7 | 15.2 | 1.2 | 11.9 | 18.1 | 4.6 | | 1.4 | - | - | 57.9% |
| 17 | SDLP | 47.9% | Foyle | 10.5 | 0.4 | 28.5 | 30.0 | 0.6 | 3.6 | 11.9 | | 13.9 | 0.8 | - | - | 55.3% |
| 18 | DUP | 42.2% | East Londonderry | | 1.3 | 21.8 | 9.5 | 3.7 | 8.3 | 36.8 | 3.5 | 9.7 | 5.4 | - | - | 50.1% |
| 18 | | | Northern Ireland | 2.0 | 2.7 | 24.0 | 12.0 | 7.0 | 12.6 | 29.2 | 3.4 | 3.9 | 3.3 | 703,744 | 1,281,595 | 54.9% |
| | | | Change since 2011 | +1.2 | +1.8 | –2.9 | –2.2 | –0.7 | –0.6 | –0.8 | +1.0 | +1.7 | +1.0 | +42,008 | +71,586 | –0.7% |
| | | | Election of May 2011 | | 0.9 | 26.9 | 14.2 | 7.7 | 13.2 | 30.0 | 2.5 | 2.2 | 2.3 | 661,736 | 1,210,009 | 55.6% |
| | | | Election of March 2007 | | 1.7 | 26.2 | 15.2 | 5.2 | 14.9 | 30.1 | - | 3.8 | 2.8 | 690,313 | 1,107,904 | 62.9% |
| | | | Election of Nov. 2003 | | 0.4 | 23.5 | 17.0 | 3.7 | 22.7 | 25.7 | - | 5.6 | 2.8 | 692,026 | 1,097,526 | 63.1% |
| | | | Election of June 1998 | | 0.1 | 17.6 | 22.0 | 6.5 | 21.3 | 18.1 | - | 10.9 | 3.5 | 823,565 | 1,178,556 | 69.9% |

- Independent Unionist vote in 1998 (2.8%) included in the Independent column (not "others"). TUV = Traditional Unionist Voice.

== Incumbents defeated ==
=== Sinn Féin ===
- Rosie McCorley — Belfast West
- Maeve McLaughlin — Foyle
- Cathal Ó hOisín — East Londonderry
- Phil Flanagan — Fermanagh and South Tyrone

=== Democratic Unionist Party ===
- Jonathan Craig — Lagan Valley
- Ian McCrea — Mid Ulster
- David McIlveen — North Antrim

=== Ulster Unionist Party ===
- Alastair Patterson — Fermanagh and South Tyrone
- Adrian Cochrane-Watson - South Antrim

=== Social Democratic and Labour Party ===
- Dolores Kelly — Upper Bann
- Gerard Diver — Foyle
- Karen McKevitt — South Down (stood in Newry and Armagh)
- Fearghal McKinney — Belfast South
- Seán Rogers — South Down

=== Independent ===
- John McCallister — South Down

== Opinion Polling ==
=== Graphical summary ===
View source data.

| Pollster | Client | Date(s) conducted | Sample size | DUP (U) | SF (N) | SDLP (N) | UUP (U) | Alliance (O) | TUV (U) | Green (O) | Others | Lead |
|---|---|---|---|---|---|---|---|---|---|---|---|---|
| Lucid Talk | Belfast Telegraph | 30 Mar – 1 Apr 2016 | 970 | 26.5% | 25.8% | 11.9% | 15.6% | 8.1% | 4.1% | 2.6% | 5.4% | 0.7% |
| Lucid Talk | Belfast Telegraph | 8–12 Feb 2016 | 2,886 | 26.6% | 24.6% | 11.2% | 14.5% | 8.2% | 3.5% | 2.6% | 8.8% | 2.0% |
| Lucid Talk | Belfast Telegraph | 19–21 Oct 2015 | 2,517 | 25.8% | 25.4% | 10.8% | 15.0% | 7.6% | 3.2% | 2.4% | 9.8% | 0.4% |
| | | 7 May 2015 | 2015 United Kingdom general election | | | | | | | | | |
| | | 22 May 2014 | 2014 Northern Ireland local elections | | | | | | | | | |
| | | 22 May 2014 | 2014 European Parliament election | | | | | | | | | |
| Lucid Talk | Belfast Telegraph | 17 Sep 2013 | N/A | 29.3% | 26.1% | 13.8% | 10.8% | 10.2% | 2.2% | 1.3% | 6.3% | 3.2% |
| Ipsos-MORI | BBC | 17–26 Jan 2013 | 1,046 | 24% | 23% | 19% | 13% | 10% | — | — | 11% | 1% |
| 2011 Assembly Election | | 5 May 2011 | N/A | 29.3% | 26.3% | 13.9% | 12.9% | 7.7% | 2.4% | 0.9% | 6.6% | 3.0% |

== Manifestos ==
- Manifesto 2016, Alliance
- Our Plan for Northern Ireland, Democratic Unionist Party
- A Zero Waste Strategy for Northern Ireland, Green Party Northern Ireland
- Better With Sinn Féin, Sinn Féin
- Build a Better Future, Social Democratic and Labour Party
- Straight Talking Principled Politics, Traditional Unionist Voice
- Northern Ireland Assembly Manifesto 2016, Democratic Unionist Party
- It's Time For Real Change, UK Independence Party
- Standing Against Austerity, Workers' Party
