= Labour Party in Northern Ireland =

Political party in Northern Ireland

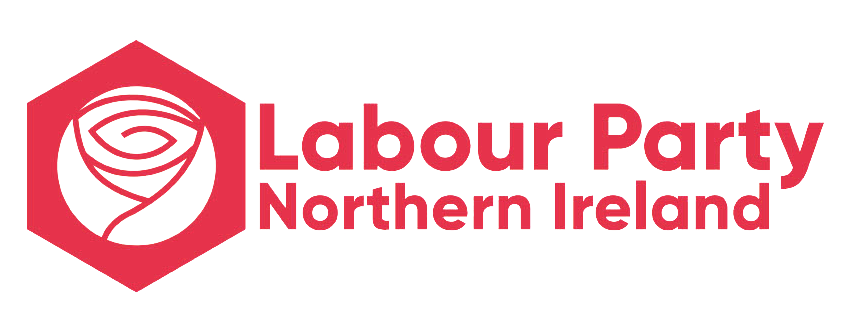
- President: N/A
- Chairman: Erskine Holmes
- Secretary: Boyd Black
- Vice Chair: Joan Martin
- Founded: c. 2003
- Youth wing: Young Labour in Northern Ireland
- Membership (2017): 2,000
- Ideology: Social democracy
- Political position: Centre-left
- National affiliation: Labour Party
- European affiliation: Party of European Socialists
- International affiliation: Progressive Alliance; Socialist International (observer)
- Colours: Red
- House of Commons (NI Seats): 0 / 18
- House of Lords: 1 / 783
- NI Assembly: 0 / 90
- Local Government: 0 / 462

Website
- labourpartyni.org

The Labour Party in Northern Ireland (LPNI) is the UK Labour Party's regional constituency organisation that operates in Northern Ireland. The Labour Party is not a registered political party in Northern Ireland and does not currently contest elections there, as it has an electoral pact with the Social Democratic and Labour Party (SDLP) to support its candidates.

In the 2016 Assembly elections, eight members of the party ran for election under the name of the Northern Ireland Labour Representation Committee, as the Labour Party National Executive Committee had refused to allow candidates to stand as official Labour Party candidates.

== History ==
For many years the UK Labour Party held to a policy of not allowing residents of Northern Ireland to apply for membership, instead recognising the Social Democratic and Labour Party (SDLP) as its sister party in Northern Ireland, which had informally taken the Labour whip in the House of Commons. This relationship continues today, with Labour maintaining an electoral pact with the SDLP not to stand in Northern Ireland and to support SDLP candidates instead.

The 2003 Labour Party Conference accepted legal advice that the party could not continue to prohibit residents of the province joining, and whilst the National Executive Committee has established a regional constituency party it has not yet agreed to contest elections there.

While the party has not officially contested elections in Northern Ireland, a Labour government in Westminster has administered the Northern Ireland Executive during periods of suspension and direct rule.

=== House of Lords ===
Margaret Ritchie, Baroness Ritchie of Downpatrick sits in the House of Lords as a member of the Labour Party.

=== Labour Representation Committee ===
In December 2015, the LPNI's executive committee voted to contest elections in Northern Ireland. In the run-up to the 2016 Assembly elections, local members registered a new party, the Northern Ireland Labour Representation Committee, with the Electoral Commission recognising them in April 2016. The party's constitution has a clause stating that it will disband once Labour lifts the ban on contesting elections in Northern Ireland. The new party's leader is journalist and author Kathryn Johnston. Several former members of the Northern Ireland Labour Party hold membership, including Erskine Holmes and Douglas McIldoon. Eight candidates ran under the label, despite the Labour Party warning Northern Irish Labour party members that they could face expulsion from the party for standing as candidates, as Labour party members who support a political organisation outside the Labour group can be expelled. Johnston highlighted policy differences with the SDLP, including Labour's position on abortion, same-sex marriage and support for an integrated and secular education system. The move to stand in elections was assisted by former Labour MP Andrew MacKinlay. They stood one candidate each in eight of the eighteen constituencies in the 2016 Assembly elections. They won no seats, with candidates obtaining between 0.2% and 0.7% of the first-preference votes. After the 2016 assembly election, Labour leader Jeremy Corbyn had publicly stated that he would consider candidates for the next election, stating, "There is a democratic deficit in one sense. There is a question of a relationship with other parties in Northern Ireland as well and how that will be affected."

In the 2016 UK leadership election, 765 Labour party members in Northern Ireland took part in the vote, with a majority voting for Corbyn (Corbyn 541; Owen Smith 224).

The LPNI did not stand in the 2017 Assembly elections. However, LPNI member Donal O'Cofaigh was expelled from the party for standing on the Cross-Community Labour Alternative party list. In May 2017, a member of the executive of the Labour Party in Northern Ireland wrote to the Labour Party threatening legal action should the party continue to refuse to allow LPNI members to stand for election in Northern Ireland. The following year, delegates from the Northern Ireland party attended the 2017 national conference to bring their arguments to other delegates at fringe events. In August 2017, several officers in the LPNI structure, including chair Anna McAleavy, vice chair Damien Harris and secretary Kathryn Johnston – the last of whom contested the 2016 assembly election – resigned in an internal struggle inside the party leading up to the National Executive Committee assessing LPNI's case for structuring as a full part of the Labour Party (like Welsh Labour or Scottish Labour).

In May 2018, Corbyn made his first visit to Northern Ireland as leader of the Labour Party. In this two-day visit, he visited Derry and the border areas and finished with a speech at Queen's University in Belfast. His speech focused on restoring devolved government – after it had been in a political deadlock since the 2017 assembly election – and mitigating disruption to Northern Ireland caused by Brexit. His speech was 'broadly well received'; however, there was some upset caused within the regional Labour Party, as he did not visit any of the branches or executive committee in this time. At a fringe event during the 2018 Labour party conference in Liverpool, the Unite union leader Len McCluskey said his union would back Labour Party standing candidates in Northern Ireland if that was decided. Colum Eastwood, leader of the SDLP, was notably not at the conference that year when the leader of the party usually attends.

Despite this, Labour chose not to run candidates at the 2019 election, instead endorsing the Social Democratic and Labour Party again. In a statement to the Belfast Telegraph former Labour MP Kate Hoey called this decision "disappointing".

== Structure ==
As of September 2017 it was recorded that 37,000 Northern Irish trade union members had opted-in to pay the political levy their trade union offers which largely goes to the Labour Party. Additionally the party in the area had over 2,000 members and 1,000 registered supporters.

== NILRC electoral results ==
=== 2016 Assembly elections ===
Party	Leader	Seats			Votes		
Party	Leader	Candidates	won	Change from 2011	First preference votes	First pref. %	Change from 2011
NI Labour	Kathryn Johnston	8	-		1,577	0.2%	N/A

Constituency	Candidate	First pref. votes	First pref. %
North Antrim	Kathryn Johnston	243	0.6%
Belfast North	Abdo Thabeth	127	0.3%
Belfast South	Brigitte Anton	246	0.7%
North Down	Maria Lourenco	177	0.5%
Lagan Valley	Peter Dynes	171	0.4%
Upper Bann	Emma Hutchinson	250	0.5%
Fermanagh and South Tyrone	Damien Harris	285	0.6%
