= Sinéad Bradley =

Northern Irish politician (born 1972)

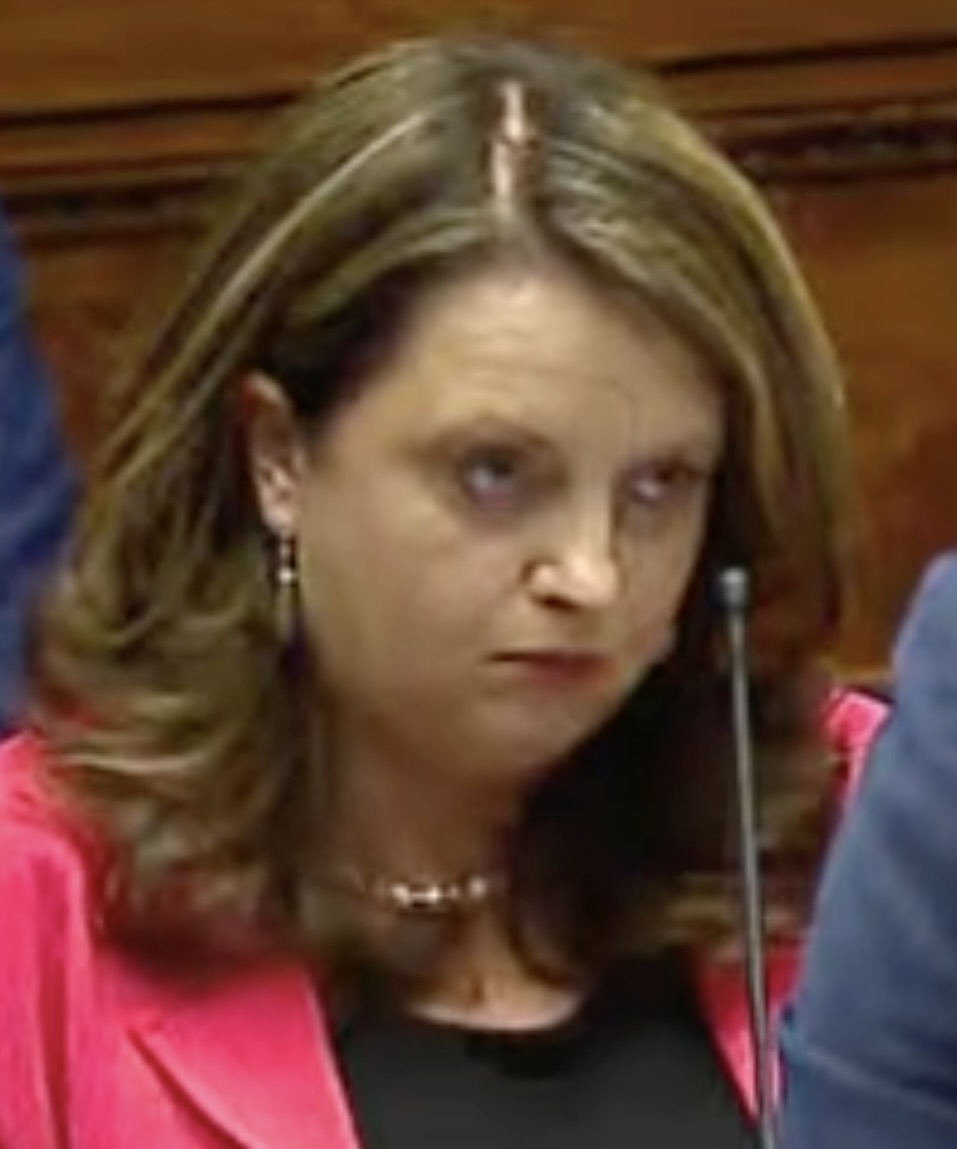
- Bradley in 2016

Member of the Northern Ireland Assembly for South Down
- In office 5 May 2016 – 28 March 2022
- Preceded by: Karen McKevitt
- Succeeded by: Patrick Brown

Personal details
- Born: 17 February 1972 (age 54) Burren, County Down, Northern Ireland
- Party: Social Democratic and Labour Party
- Relations: P. J. Bradley (father)

Sinéad Bradley (born 17 February 1972) is a Social Democratic and Labour Party (SDLP) politician from Northern Ireland. She was an MLA for South Down from the 2016 election, but did not contest the 2022 election. She was the SDLP spokesperson on Economy and Health.

== Background ==
She was born in the Burren, County Down to former MLA P. J. Bradley and his wife Leontia. Sinéad was the campaign manager for her father's successful 1998 Assembly election campaign.

She attended Ballyholland Primary School and St. Mary's High School, Newry. She then went to Manchester Metropolitan University from which she obtained a BSc(Hons) in Business studies and IT. She qualified as a teacher in 1996.

Bradley married John Challinor in 2000. The couple have a son.

Northern Ireland Assembly
| Preceded by Karen McKevitt | MLA for South Down; 2016–2022 | Next: Patrick Brown |
