= Seán Rogers =

Politician from Northern Ireland (born 1953)

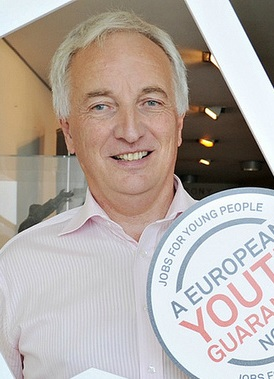

Member of the Northern Ireland Assembly for South Down
- In office April 2012 – 5 May 2016
- Preceded by: Margaret Ritchie
- Succeeded by: Colin McGrath

Member of Newry and Mourne District Council
- In office 5 May 2005 – 2 April 2012
- Preceded by: Michael Cole
- Constituency: The Mournes

Personal details
- Born: 1 January 1953 (age 73) Kilkeel, Northern Ireland
- Party: SDLP
- Spouse: Rosemary Rogers
- Children: 5
- Education: Queen's University Belfast; University of Ulster

Seán Rogers (born 1 January 1953) is an Irish former Social Democratic and Labour Party (SDLP) politician and schoolteacher who was a Member of the Northern Ireland Assembly (MLA) for South Down from 2012 to 2016.

== Political career ==
In April 2012, Rogers was co-opted to the Northern Ireland Assembly, replacing former party leader, Margaret Ritchie, who had resigned from the Assembly.

Northern Ireland Assembly
Preceded by Margaret Ritchie	MLA for South Down; 2012 – 2016	Succeeded by Colin McGrath
