= Colin McGrath =

Northern Irish politician (born 1975)

Colin McGrath MLA
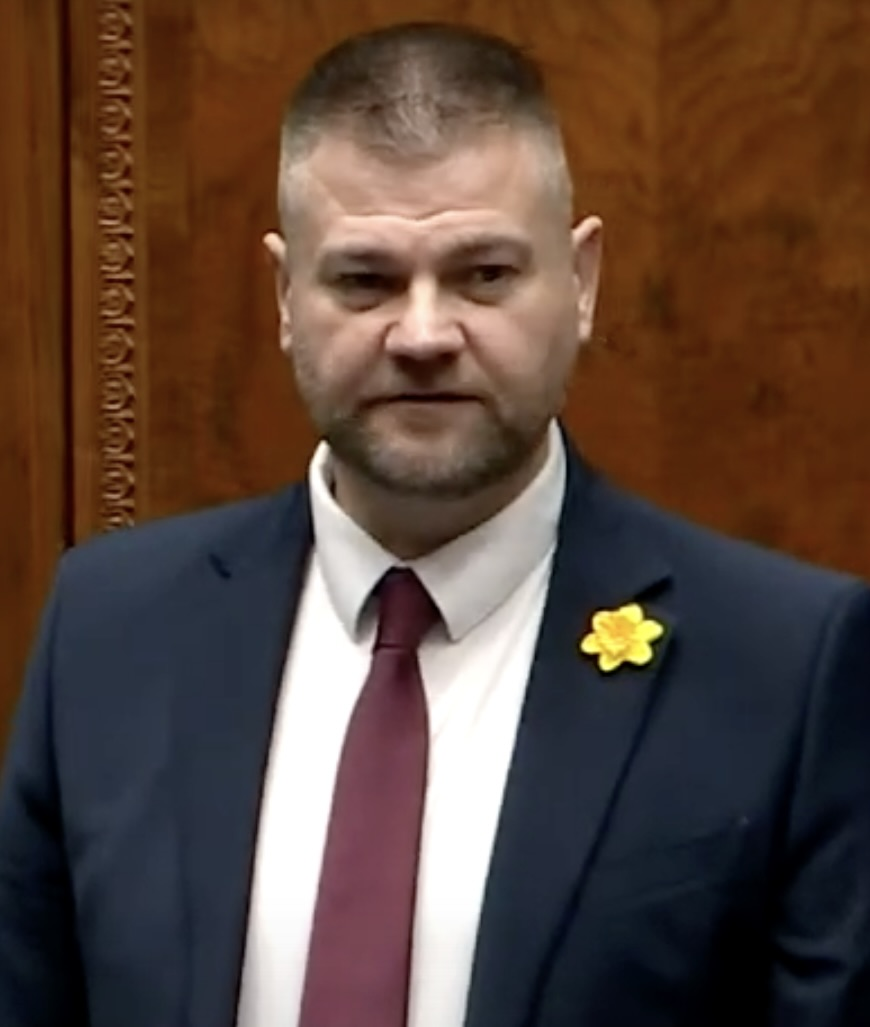

Member of the Northern Ireland Assembly for South Down
- Incumbent
- Assumed office 5 May 2016
- Preceded by: Seán Rogers

Member of Newry, Mourne and Down District Council
- In office 22 May 2014 – 5 May 2016
- Preceded by: New council
- Succeeded by: John Trainor
- Constituency: Downpatrick

Member of Down District Council
- In office 5 May 2005 – 22 May 2014
- Preceded by: Ann Trainor
- Succeeded by: Council abolished
- Constituency: Downpatrick

Personal details
- Born: 21 October 1975 (age 50) Downpatrick, Northern Ireland
- Party: Social Democratic and Labour Party
- Website: website

Colin McGrath MLA (born 21 October 1975) is an Irish Social Democratic and Labour Party (SDLP) politician from Northern Ireland. He has been a Member of the Northern Ireland Assembly for South Down since the 2016 election.

== Background ==
McGrath was born in the town of Downpatrick, County Down on 21 October 1975. He attended St Patrick's Primary School Saul, St Patrick's Grammar School and the East Down Institute (now part of South Eastern Regional College).

Following his completion of secondary education, McGrath attended the University of Ulster Jordanstown and graduated in 1998 in Community Youth Work. He then became a youth worker in Patrician Youth Centre, Downpatrick for 17 years.

== Political career ==
McGrath was first elected to the Down District Council in 2005 as a councillor for the SDLP. He served as both chair and vice-chair, becoming the youngest ever chair of the local council. In 2014 he was elected to the newly formed Newry, Mourne & Down District Council.

He entered Assembly politics when he contested the 2016 Northern Ireland Assembly election, being elected with 5,110 first-preference votes alongside fellow SDLP candidate Sinéad Bradley. The third and incumbent SDLP candidate, Seán Rogers, was not elected and so lost his seat. He was re-elected in the 2017 snap NI Assembly election. During his time in the Assembly, McGrath served as a member of the Education Committee, Business Committee and Procedures Committee.

McGrath has highlighted rural issues, accessibility to local services such as the Downe Hospital and youth issues as his main priorities. He has criticised the eleven-plus transfer system, arguing that a level playing field is required and condemning the branding of 11-year-old children as "failures" if they fail to achieve high marks. He supports his party position that academic selection "brands a large portion of children as failures and puts an inordinate amount of pressure on them". He has however argued that the debate is about academic selection rather than a disapproval of Grammar schools.

He has also served as chairman and Health Spokesperson for the SDLP.

McGrath ran in South Down at the 2024 general election, finishing second with 10,418 votes (23.0%), to Sinn Féin's Chris Hazzard.

Northern Ireland Assembly
Preceded by Seán Rogers	MLA for South Down; 2016–present	Incumbent
