= LGBTQ rights in Northern Ireland =

- Northern Ireland (dark green) within the United Kingdom (light green)
- Legal status: Always legal for women; decriminalised for men in 1982; Age of consent equalised in 2001
- Gender identity: Right to change legal gender since 2005 (UK-wide)
- Military: LGBT people allowed to serve openly since 2000 (UK-wide)
- Discrimination protections: Sexual orientation and gender reassignment protections, rarely enforced and with religious exemptions

Family rights
- Recognition of relationships: Civil partnerships since 2005 (UK-wide); Same-sex marriage since 2020
- Adoption: Full adoption rights since 2013

Lesbian, gay, bisexual, transgender, and queer (LGBTQ) people in Northern Ireland enjoy most of the same rights as non-LGBTQ people. However, the advancement of LGBTQ rights has traditionally been slower than the rest of the United Kingdom, with the region having lagged behind England, Scotland, and Wales. Northern Ireland was the last part of the United Kingdom where same-sex sexual activity was decriminalised, the last to liberalise blood donation policy for men who have sex with men and, after intervention by the Parliament of the United Kingdom, the last to allow same-sex marriage. (Note: Sark in the Bailiwick of Guernsey was the last place in the British Isles to introduce same-sex marriage, passing a law in December 2019 that came into effect in February 2020.) Compared to the neighbouring Republic of Ireland, all major LGBT rights milestones had been reached earlier in Northern Ireland, with the exception of same-sex marriage. Homosexuality was decriminalised in Northern Ireland a decade earlier and civil partnerships were introduced six years earlier.

Most liberalisation of LGBT rights in Northern Ireland has been achieved under direct rule by the Government of the United Kingdom, British parliamentary legislation or court decisions rather than through laws passed by the Northern Ireland Assembly. This is due to the veto power exercised by opponents of LGBT rights, such as the Democratic Unionist Party, under Northern Ireland's power-sharing system. In 2017, ILGA rated Northern Ireland last place in the United Kingdom for LGBT people, with 74% equality of rights compared to 86% LGBT equality in the United Kingdom overall and 92% equality in Scotland, but above the Republic of Ireland which was ranked 52% the same year.

Same-sex sexual activity has been legal since 1982 and the age of consent was equalised for all forms of sexual activity in 2001. Civil partnerships have been available for same-sex couples since 2005. Same-sex couples were granted full adoption rights in 2013. Same-sex marriage was introduced in 2020. Since 1 September 2020, religious and church same-sex marriage and weddings have been permitted in Northern Ireland.

== Laws regarding same-sex sexual activity ==
=== Historical persecution ===
Northern Ireland's homosexuality laws have historically reflected the English position, given the history of English dominance over Ireland since the 12th century, culminating in official union under the United Kingdom of Great Britain and Ireland in 1801. Following the partition of Ireland, Northern Ireland remained a part of the United Kingdom, with the remainder of Ireland forming the independent Republic of Ireland.

Homosexuality was a matter for the ecclesiastical law of the Roman Catholic Church until the reign of King Henry VIII. During his rule, the act of buggery was criminalised by the Buggery Act 1533 as part of increasing the State's role in public life at the expense of the Catholic Church. This prohibited anal sex with "mankind or beast" anywhere in England and Wales on pain of death, but did not apply to Ireland until 1634. The death penalty was retained until 1861. In 1885, the Labouchere Amendment introduced the offence of gross indecency in the Criminal Law Amendment Act 1885, which applied throughout England, Wales, Scotland and Ireland. This broadened the scope of the criminal law to outlaw any form of male homosexual activity. By contrast, adult lesbianism was never criminalised.

The Victorian era laws criminalising male homosexual acts throughout Great Britain and Ireland, the Offences against the Person Act 1861 and Criminal Law Amendment Act 1885, remained in effect well into the 20th century.

=== Campaigns for and against change ===
In 1967, the Parliament of the United Kingdom voted to pass the Sexual Offences Act 1967 for the limited decriminalisation of homosexual acts, but this applied only to England and Wales. Same-sex sexual activities were legalised in Scotland on the same basis as in the 1967 Act, by section 80 of the Criminal Justice (Scotland) Act 1980, which came into force on 1 February 1981.

The British Government's failure to extend the 1967 reforms to Northern Ireland led to the establishment of organisations such as the Campaign for Homosexual Equality and the Gay Liberation Front. During the 1970s, Northern Ireland was under direct rule from Westminster, so the organisations tried to bypass the Northern Ireland parties which were hostile to their cause and petition the Secretary of State for Northern Ireland directly. Initially, this appeared fruitful, with the Secretary referring homosexual reform to the Standing Advisory Committee on Human Rights for Northern Ireland. In 1976, the Committee recommended extending the 1967 reforms to Northern Ireland but warned that public support for the change in Northern Ireland was limited. In 1978, the British Government published a draft Order in Council to decriminalise homosexual conduct in Northern Ireland between men over 21 years of age, in line with the 1967 reforms in England and Wales. However, it failed without the support of any of the 12 Northern Ireland politicians in the Westminster Parliament and the open opposition expressed by the Democratic Unionist Party representatives.

Gay men continued to face harassment from the Royal Ulster Constabulary police force throughout the 1970s and 1980s, with the Northern Ireland Gay Rights Association (NIGRA) recording instances of harassment and continuing to lobby for decriminalisation. NIGRA members also faced arrests, forced medical examinations and house raids, ostensibly for other issues such as drug searches, but also had correspondence regarding the decriminalisation campaign confiscated by police.

NIGRA were opposed by a vociferous Save Ulster from Sodomy campaign led by Ian Paisley, the Free Presbyterian Church of Ulster and the Democratic Unionist Party, both of which were established by him. Initially, Paisley's campaign succeeded, with the British Government announcing in 1979 that it would not proceed with changes to Northern Ireland's anti-homosexuality laws. Although the Government promised that the laws would not be enforced against gay men, police harassment and arrests continued on the pretence of other misdemeanours. The arrest of one activist, NIGRA secretary Jeffrey Dudgeon, proved instrumental in the ultimate success of the decriminalisation campaign.

=== European Court of Human Rights ruling ===
Jeffrey Dudgeon was a shipping clerk in Belfast, who was a gay activist and secretary of NIGRA. On 21 January 1976, he was arrested by the Royal Ulster Constabulary drugs squad after they found marijuana and personal correspondence describing homosexual acts performed by him. He was interrogated for over four hours about his sex life and made to sign a statement about his sexual activities. The police forwarded the material to prosecutors to have Dudgeon charged with gross indecency, but the Director of Prosecutions decided not to proceed on the grounds that it would not be in the public interest. Dudgeon was informed in February 1977 of the decision and his private papers, which had been annotated by the police, were returned to him.

Both NIGRA and the Irish gay rights groups financially supported Dudgeon filing a complaint with the European Commission of Human Rights against Northern Ireland's anti-homosexuality laws in 1975. Dudgeon alleged that the laws were invalid on two grounds. Firstly, he claimed that the laws and resulting police investigation interfered with his right to respect for private life in violation of Article 8 of the European Convention on Human Rights. Secondly, Dudgeon alleged that he had suffered discrimination on the grounds of sex, sexuality and residence in accordance with Article 14 of the European Convention on Human Rights. Despite having previously rejected similar earlier complaints as "manifestly inadmissible", the Commission declared the complaint to be admissible on 3 March 1978. On 13 March 1980, the Commission issued a report stating that "the legal prohibition of [homosexual] acts between male persons over 21 years of age breached the applicant's right to respect for his private life". It referred the case to the European Court of Human Rights for judgment on 18 July 1980.

On 22 October 1981, the European Court of Human Rights ruled by a 15–4 majority in Dudgeon v United Kingdom that no member nation had the right to impose a total ban on homosexual activity. More specifically, the Court held that the criminalisation of male homosexual acts for men above 21 years old in the Offences Against the Person Act 1861 violated Article 8 of the European Convention on Human Rights by interfering with his right to private life, regardless of whether he was actually charged or prosecuted under the law. The case determined that countries no longer had a margin of appreciation to regulate adult private consensual homosexual acts in the name of morality, recognising that homosexuality was an immutable characteristic of human nature.

=== Legalisation by Westminster (1982 and 2003) ===
The 1981 ECHR decision led the United Kingdom Parliament to extend the 1967 decriminalisation of male homosexual acts to Northern Ireland the following year with an Order in Council, the Homosexual Offences (Northern Ireland) Order 1982, which came into force on 8 December 1982.

Anti-LGBT provisions of the criminal law were removed completely throughout Northern Ireland and the United Kingdom in the Sexual Offences Act 2003, with section 9 abolishing the discriminatory offences of buggery and gross indecency. Private gay sex between more than two people was legalised, but cottaging remains illegal.

=== Age of consent equalisation (2000) ===
The homosexual age of consent fixed by the Homosexual Offences (Northern Ireland) Order 1982 was 21 years, higher than the heterosexual age of consent in Northern Ireland of 17. The ages of consent for homosexual and heterosexual acts in Northern Ireland were eventually equalised at 17 by the Parliament of the United Kingdom with the passage of the Sexual Offences (Amendment) Act 2000, which went into effect in 2001.

To bring Northern Ireland in line with the rest of the United Kingdom, the British Parliament passed the Sexual Offences (Northern Ireland) Order 2008, reducing the age of consent to 16, despite the opposition of the Northern Ireland Assembly.

=== Pardons for historical convictions (2017) ===
In November 2016, the Northern Ireland Assembly passed a Legislative Consent Motion to extend the operation of United Kingdom's Policing and Crime Act 2017, including its Alan Turing Law, to Northern Ireland. That law enables anyone convicted of anti-homosexuality offences to obtain a pardon. The only opponent in the Assembly was Traditional Unionist Voice's Jim Allister, whose private member's motion to remove historical pardons from the Legislative Consent Motion failed on a voice vote.

In June 2019, it was revealed that only two men had sought pardons for historic gay sex offences in Northern Ireland, and that they both failed to have their convictions overturned.

=== Prison gay sex loophole lawsuits ===
In July 2021, lawsuits were launched in the UK - due to all prisons in Northern Ireland still legally banning gay sex since 1982, as within a loophole exemption.

== Recognition of same-sex relationships ==
Civil partnerships have been available for same-sex couples since 2005. Same-sex marriage was voted on five times by the Northern Ireland Assembly, and although it was supported by a slim majority on the fifth attempt, it was vetoed by the Democratic Unionist Party using the petition of concern. The division over the issue eventually led the UK Parliament to directly legalise same-sex marriage in the region, which came into effect on 13 January 2020. Until that date, same-sex marriages performed outside Northern Ireland were recognised as civil partnerships within its borders. A 2018 Sky Data survey found that 76% of Northern Irish people supported the introduction of same-sex marriage.

Since 1 September 2020, religious and church same-sex marriage and weddings have been legal in Northern Ireland.

=== Civil partnerships ===
Civil partnerships have been available to same-sex couples in Northern Ireland since 2005, when the UK Parliament passed the Civil Partnership Act 2004. The Act gives same-sex couples all of the rights and responsibilities as civil marriage. Civil partners are entitled to the same property rights as married opposite-sex couples, the same exemption as married couples on inheritance tax, social security and pension benefits, and also the ability to get parental responsibility for a partner's children, as well as responsibility for reasonable maintenance of one's partner and their children, tenancy rights, full life insurance recognition, next of kin rights in hospitals, and others. There is a formal process for dissolving partnerships akin to divorce. Civil partnerships can be conducted by religious organisations in England, Wales and Scotland but not in Northern Ireland.

=== Same-sex marriage ===
==== Northern Ireland Assembly proposals (2012–2015) ====
There were five attempts to introduce same-sex marriage in the Northern Ireland Assembly, with a majority supporting legalisation in 2015 but the Democratic Unionist Party exercising its veto powers by filing a petition of concern. Around the time of the successful Irish same-sex marriage referendum in 2015, an Ipsos Mori poll carried out between 20 May and 8 June 2015 found that 68% of people in Northern Ireland supported same-sex marriage.

On 1 October 2012, the first Northern Ireland Assembly motion regarding same-sex marriage was introduced by Sinn Féin and the Greens. The motion was defeated 50–45.

On 29 April 2013, the second attempt to introduce same-sex marriage was defeated by the Northern Ireland Assembly 53–42, with the Democratic Unionist Party and Ulster Unionist Party voting against and Sinn Féin, the Social Democratic and Labour Party, Alliance and the Green Party voting in favour.

The third attempt on 29 April 2014 was defeated 51–43, with all nationalist MLAs (Sinn Féin and SDLP), most Alliance MLAs and four unionists (two from NI21 and two from UUP) in favour. The remaining unionists (DUP, UUP, UKIP and Traditional Unionist Voice) and two Alliance MLAs voted against.

A fourth attempt on 27 April 2015 also failed, 49–47. Again, Sinn Féin, SDLP and five Alliance members voted in favour, while the DUP and all but four of the UUP members (who were granted a conscience vote) voted against.

On 2 November 2015, the Northern Ireland Assembly voted for a fifth time on the question of legalising same-sex marriage. Of the 105 legislators who voted, 53 were in favour and 51 against, the first time a majority of the Assembly had ever voted in favour of same-sex marriage. However, the DUP again tabled a petition of concern signed by 32 members, preventing the motion from having any legal effect.

In February 2016, local LGBT publication The Gay Say started an online petition calling on the DUP to stop abusing the petition of concern against same-sex marriage legislation. On 20 September 2016, MLA Gerry Carroll (People Before Profit) presented the petition of 20,000 signatures to the Northern Ireland Assembly.

A December 2016 LucidTalk poll of 1,080 found that 65.2% of people surveyed supported the legalisation of same-sex marriage in Northern Ireland. However, a majority of Unionist respondents was opposed to same-sex marriage in Northern Ireland, with only 37.04% in favour (with support rising to 71% for Unionists aged between 18 and 24 years of age). By contrast, 92.92% of Nationalist/Republican respondents and 95.75% of Alliance/Green/PBP voters were in favour.

==== Court challenges to same-sex marriage ban (2015–2019) ====
Citing the Assembly's constant refusal to approve a marriage bill and the law that recognises marriages from other parts of the United Kingdom as civil partnerships, Amnesty International and local LGBT rights group Rainbow Project announced that a court challenge against Northern Ireland's same-sex marriage ban was likely to proceed on human rights grounds.

In January 2015, a same-sex couple married in England and residing in Northern Ireland filed a lawsuit to have their marriage locally recognised. In August 2017, the High Court ruled that same-sex marriage was a matter of social policy for the Parliament to decide rather than the judiciary. An appeal was filed with the Court of Appeal, and a ruling was expected sometime in 2019. On 7 April 2020, the Court of Appeal in Belfast ruled that same-sex couples faced unjustified discrimination while denied the opportunity to marry in Northern Ireland. But with changes to the law meaning same-sex weddings can take place in Northern Ireland since 11 February 2020, senior judges decided not to make a formal declaration on any human rights breach.

==== Legalisation by Westminster (2019–2020) ====
In July 2019, Labour MP Conor McGinn announced his intention to attach an amendment to an upcoming administrative bill in the UK Parliament relating to Northern Ireland, which would legalise same-sex marriage three months after passage of the bill if the Northern Ireland Assembly remained suspended. Under the terms of the originally-drafted amendment, the region's executive could approve or repeal the measure upon resumption. The amendment passed in the House of Commons with 383 votes in favour and 73 votes against. McGinn's amendment, which was further amended by Lord Hayward during passage in the House of Lords, required the Secretary of State to issue regulations extending same-sex marriage to Northern Ireland if the Assembly did not reconvene by 21 October 2019. The bill passed its final stages in the Parliament and received royal assent on 24 July 2019.

The regulations implementing same-sex marriage were signed by Julian Smith, Secretary of State for Northern Ireland, on 19 December 2019. Those regulations took effect on 13 January 2020. With couples required to wait 28 days after submitting their intention to marry, the first same-sex wedding occurred on 11 February 2020. That day, the first legally recognised same-sex marriage in Northern Ireland was celebrated for Belfast couple Robyn Peoples and Sharni Edwards-Peoples. Couples in a civil partnership have been able to convert their union to a marriage since December 2020.

== Adoption and parenting rights ==
Adoption by unmarried and same-sex couples was legalised after rulings by the High Court in 2012, and the Court of Appeal in 2013, that Northern Ireland's ban on same-sex couple adoption was discriminatory and a breach of human rights. The ban had been defended by the Northern Ireland Department of Health and its minister, Edwin Poots. A further appeal by Poots to the Supreme Court of the United Kingdom was rejected in 2013, bringing Northern Ireland into line with the rest of the United Kingdom on LGBT adoption. In December 2018, nearly 5 years after the change of adoption laws, it was reported that out of 30 same-sex couples who had applied to adopt, only 2 couples had had a child placed with them - a success rate of 1 in 15. The lower rate in Northern Ireland could be due to the fact that adoption processes can take several years to be completed, meaning some adopters are still in the process and may have been approved, but not had a child placed with them yet, and that because unlike in England and Wales where same-sex adoption was introduced in 2005 and in Scotland in 2009 by their respective parliaments, Northern Ireland only did so in 2013 after a lengthy legal battle.

The legal position regarding co-parenting arrangements where a gay man/couple donates sperm to a lesbian couple is complex. Following the changes implemented by the Human Fertilisation and Embryology Act 2008, lesbian couples who conceive with donated sperm are likely to be treated as both being the parents of their child. If the lesbian couple a man is donating to are civil partners/married, the father's status will be automatically excluded. If the lesbian couple he is donating to are not civil partners/married, the mothers may be able to choose whether they wish the child's second parent to be the father or the non-birth mother.

Altruistic surrogacy is legal in the United Kingdom, including Northern Ireland. The law supports gay fathers conceiving through surrogacy in the UK in the same way as it does heterosexual couples and allows for applications to the relevant court, for such parents who wish to be named on their child's birth certificate as the legal parents/guardians of the child.

== Transgender rights ==
The Gender Recognition Act 2004 of the United Kingdom, which provides for a person's change of gender to be officially recognised, applies to Northern Ireland. The legislation was introduced after the 2002 case of Goodwin v United Kingdom, in which the European Court of Human Rights ruled that the United Kingdom's earlier failure to do so was a violation of articles 8 and 12 of the European Convention on Human Rights. To change gender, a person must demonstrate gender dysphoria and have lived in the relevant gender for two years before applying for a gender recognition certificate. Before the 2020 introduction of same sex marriage, a person had to be unmarried before changing their legal gender.

=== Northern Ireland court ruling ===
In May 2021, a court judgement by a judge within Northern Ireland under a challenge to the near 20 years old UK gender recognition law made a binding ruling that "gender dysphoria" based on an individual's mental dynamic is no longer legally required - due to the WHO decision back in 2019, no longer treating outdated "gender identity disorder" under DMD-IV as a mental illness or mental disorder. It only applies to Northern Ireland so far and not the rest of the UK, but sets up a legal precedent in the future for the rest of the UK.

== Discrimination protections ==
=== Equality framework ===
Under the Good Friday Agreement, the Government of the United Kingdom agreed that it would create:

a statutory duty on public authorities in Northern Ireland to carry out all their functions with due regard to the need to promote equality of opportunity in relation to religion and political opinion; gender... and sexual orientation.

This is reflected in section 75 of the Northern Ireland Act 1998, which requires public authorities in Northern Ireland to have due regard to promoting equality of opportunity between persons of different sexual orientation, among other things. In practice, this requires each authority to create an Equality Scheme to demonstrate how they will achieve this. The Equality Commission for Northern Ireland monitors compliance by public authorities with their section 75 duties.

=== Anti-discrimination laws ===
Northern Ireland is the only jurisdiction in the United Kingdom where the British Equality Act 2010 has limited application. There are two main sources of anti-discrimination law on the grounds of sexual orientation. The Employment Equality (Sexual Orientation) Regulations (NI) 2003 prohibit discrimination and harassment in employment, higher education and vocational training, and went into effect on 2 December 2003. The Equality Act (Sexual Orientation) Regulations (NI) 2006 prohibit discrimination in the provision of goods and services, premises, education and public functions, and went into effect on 1 January 2007. The laws were opposed by conservative religious activists and groups. The Democratic Unionist Party's Jeffrey Donaldson introduced a motion opposing the 2006 regulations, which were rejected by Sinn Féin as an attempt to stir up homophobia and failed in the Assembly on a tied 39-all vote.

The Sex Discrimination (Gender Reassignment) Regulations (Northern Ireland) 1999 provides a degree of protection for transgender people who are undergoing "gender reassignment" in employment and vocational training.

=== Ashers Bakery case ===
In what became known as the "gay cake case", the Ashers Bakery, which is operated by evangelical Christians, was ordered by the County Court in 2015 to pay £500 in damages for breaching anti-discrimination laws by refusing to bake a cake featuring the slogan "Support Gay Marriage". The proposed cake also featured Sesame Street characters Bert and Ernie, who had been subject to debunked speculation that the two were gay. The decision against the bakery was upheld by the Court of Appeal.

The case led to opposing demonstrations for and against the decision, with LGBT activist Peter Tatchell supporting the bakery's refusal to produce a message they disagreed with on the grounds of freedom of conscience and belief. In 2014, Democratic Unionist Party MLA Paul Givan proposed introducing a "conscience clause" into Northern Ireland's equality laws to allow anti-LGBT discrimination by people and businesses on the basis of their religious beliefs. The proposal was supported by the then First Minister Peter Robinson and his Democratic Unionist Party colleagues but opposed by other parties in the Northern Ireland Assembly as well as the Equality Commission for Northern Ireland. His successor Arlene Foster threatened to limit the powers of the Equality Commission for Northern Ireland, alleging that it was not protecting the interests of faith communities.

The Supreme Court of the United Kingdom sat in Belfast to hear a further appeal over four days commencing on 30 April 2018. On 10 October 2018, the five justices comprising the Court unanimously ruled that because the bakery's objection related to the proposed message on the cake rather than the customer's personal attributes, there was no discrimination on the grounds of sexual orientation. (Note: The president of the Supreme Court, Lady Brenda Hale, said "It is deeply humiliating and an affront to human dignity to deny someone the service because of that person's race, gender, sexual orientation, religion or belief. But that is not what happened in this case and it does the project of equal treatment no favors to seek to extend it beyond its proper scope.") Lee indicated that he would appeal the matter to the European Court of Human Rights. In January 2022, the ECHR dissimmed the case due to lower courts ruling on the issue, keeping the lower court's ruling intact.

=== Gay conversion therapy ban ===
In April 2021, a non-binding motion passed in Stormont, with 59 to 24 votes against to introduce a ban on conversion therapy. The DUP attempted to amend the motion to allow for limited therapy in relation to "preaching, prayer, and pastoral support", arguing that this did not constitute conversion therapy, but this was defeated.

== Blood donation ==
In 1981, the United Kingdom banned blood donations from any men who had engaged in sex with other men indefinitely. In 2011, this was reduced to a one-year deferral system in England, Wales and Scotland. The Health Minister of Northern Ireland at the time, Edwin Poots, announced that Northern Ireland would not follow suit and would retain its permanent ban. Poots was criticised by political rivals Ulster Unionist Party and Sinn Féin for his decision as reflecting the anti-gay prejudice of his Democratic Unionist Party rather than any legitimate public safety concerns. The permanent ban also failed to address the inconsistency of Northern Ireland accepting blood from other parts of the UK, which allowed blood donations from gay men who had been celibate for at least one year at the time.

The permanent blood ban was challenged in court, with the challenge initially succeeding at first instance before Justice Treacy in the High Court on the basis that the permanent gay blood ban was irrational and legally defective. However, in a 2-1 decision, the Court of Appeal reinstated the ban, finding no evidence of apparent bias by Poots and leaving the blood donation policy a matter for the Health Minister of Northern Ireland.

In 2016, new Health Minister Michelle O'Neill of Sinn Féin announced that Northern Ireland would move to a one-year deferral system, in line with the rest of the United Kingdom at the time, with effect from 1 September 2016. In 2020, the deferral period was reduced to 3 months, in line with the rest of the United Kingdom's policy since 2017, with effect from 1 June 2020.

In August 2021, Northern Ireland implemented a new blood donation policy allowing monogamous gay and bi men to donate blood without a waiting period. Non-monogamous gay and bi men must still wait 3 months (called the “deferred period”). This reflected the approach taken in the rest of the UK, which England, Wales and Scotland had implemented in June 2021.

== Social conditions ==
A WIMPS.tv news report on the 2011 Belfast Gay Pride parade

According to the Police Service of Northern Ireland, reports of homophobic attacks have increased every year since data collection began, from 196 incidents in 2004–2005 to 334 in 2014–2015. Researchers from Ulster University and Queen's University Belfast suggest that, although rising figures reflect the continuing challenges experienced by LGBT people, they may also indicate a growing confidence among LGBT people in the police's ability to handle homophobic crimes.

A 2013 survey of Northern Ireland's LGBT community found that "47% had considered suicide, 25% had attempted it, 35% had self-harmed and 71% had suffered depression".

=== Public attitudes ===
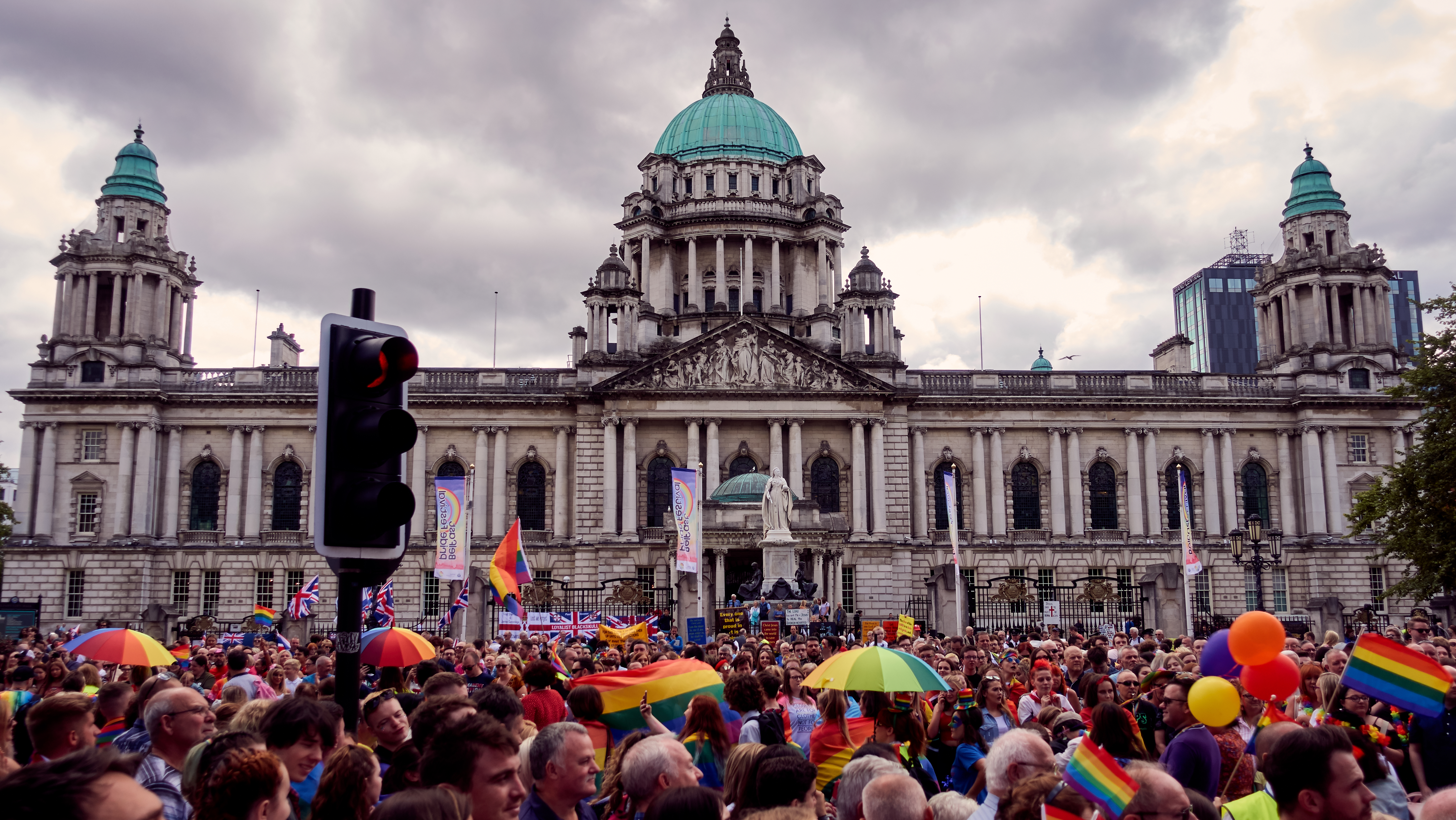
Participants at Belfast City Hall during Belfast Pride 2018

Data from the Northern Ireland Life and Times survey between 1989 and 2012 indicated that public acceptance of homosexuality in Northern Ireland had increased markedly, with those believing that same-sex relations are "always wrong" falling from 76% to 28% over that time. Support for same-sex marriage had also increased, rising from 35% in 2005 to 58% in 2012. In the 2013 survey, support for same-sex marriage was recorded as 59%. Although support for equality was strongest among Catholics and irreligious respondents, the 2013 survey also found a plurality of Protestants (46% vs 42%) supported same-sex marriage. The 2013 survey findings also suggest that awareness of LGBT inequality had risen over time, with increasing support for teaching equality in schools and allowing same-sex marriage.

A comparison of attitudes between Northern Ireland and the Republic of Ireland demonstrated that social attitudes in the former were more strongly opposed to homosexuality, while noting a substantial decline in opposition over time. In the Republic to the south, the power of religious conservatism waned in the aftermath of Church scandals in relation to Magdalene Laundries and child sexual abuse, coupled with a growing perception that the Church held too much power in Irish politics. By contrast, Northern Ireland has more traditionalist Protestants and Catholics, who may agree on anti-LGBTQ issues on occasion despite sectarian differences. To some extent, the conservative religious attitudes are a legacy of the Troubles, when religion offered solace from pervasive violence while limiting the growth of secular or socially liberal attitudes.

In Northern Ireland, negative attitudes towards LGBT rights were more common among people who were older, Protestant or who attended church regularly. Pro-LGBTQ views were more likely among those who knew a gay or lesbian person and those who did not perceive homosexuality as a "choice".

=== LGBTQ culture ===
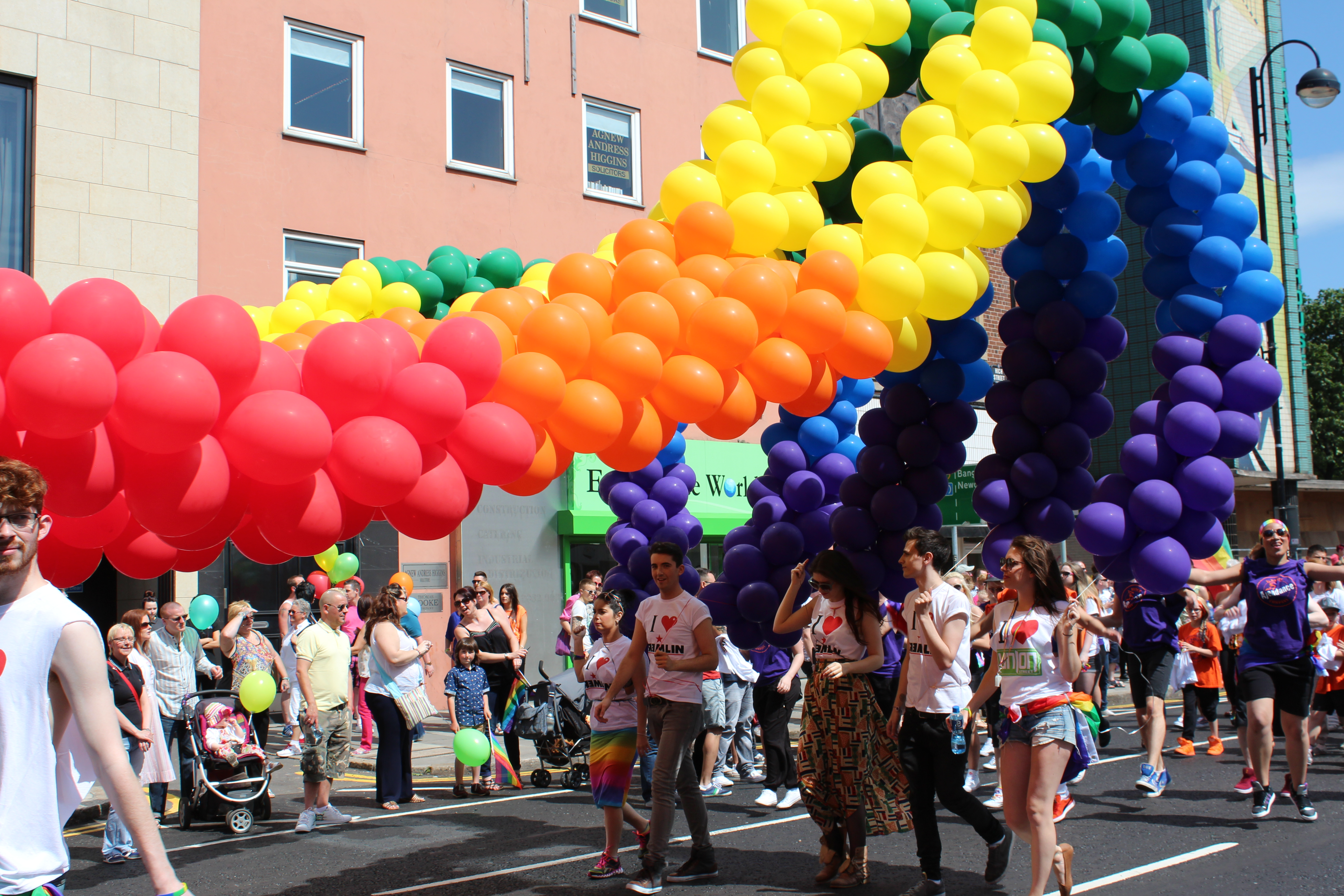
Belfast Pride 2013

Belfast Pride is a significant LGBTQ event in Northern Ireland, growing from 50 participants singing gay anthems at its first parade or "dander" in 1991 to over 6,500 participants with 12 carnival floats in 2006. An organiser noted that it had taken eight years since the decriminalisation of male homosexuality before such a march could be organised at all. The pride parade was noted for its ability to at least temporarily unite historically divided communities - Unionist and Nationalist, Protestant and Catholic. Overall, Belfast has little gay space. In 2019, more than 50,000 participated in the Pride festivities in Belfast.

== Politics ==
With no Northern Ireland party supporting LGBT rights before 2009, the issue now enjoys greater political support, although it is polarised along sectarian lines in Northern Ireland politics. Nationalist and Republican parties such as Sinn Féin and the Social Democratic and Labour Party generally support LGBT rights as part of an equality and minority rights agenda. By contrast, Unionist parties such as the Democratic Unionist Party, Traditional Unionist Voice and elements of the Ulster Unionist Party have been the strongest opponents of pro-LGBT policies such as same-sex marriage. The non-sectarian liberal Alliance Party of Northern Ireland's position has evolved in favour of same-sex marriage. Political affiliation is now a stronger predictor of a person's position on same-sex marriage than being Protestant or Catholic, making it part of a new culture war.

The Democratic Unionist Party has faced criticism for abusing the petition of concern, originally intended to protect Northern Ireland's Nationalists and Unionists from legislation discriminating against either community by requiring cross-community support if submitted by 30 members of either side - as a "tool of LGBTQ oppression". A petition of concern can be presented to the Speaker of the Assembly if it is signed by at least 30 Assembly members. Once presented it triggers a 60% weighted majority requirement, needing at least 40% support from each of the Nationalist and Unionist members to pass the proposed measure.

Because the DUP held more than 50% of Unionist seats in the Assembly before the 2017 Northern Ireland election, the party could single-handedly veto any legislation if its members presented a petition of concern. After the 2017 election, the DUP lost its veto power but could still block measures such as same-sex marriage with the support of fellow Unionists Jim Allister from Traditional Unionist Voice and Roy Beggs of the Ulster Unionist Party, who both offered to join a future petition of concern on the issue. The practical effect of the sectarian divisions on LGBT issues is that the Northern Ireland Assembly is at an impasse, with mutual vetoes from each side ensuring that LGBT rights can neither be advanced nor rolled back through new Assembly laws.

From the deadlocked 2017 Assembly elections until 11 January 2020, Northern Ireland had no functioning legislative or executive institutions. The disagreement between the two largest parties, the DUP and Sinn Féin, over same-sex marriage was one of the issues delaying a new power-sharing government being formed.

=== Unionist ===
==== Democratic Unionist Party ====
The DUP has been strongly associated with opposition to LGBT rights since its establishment in 1971 by Ian Paisley, who also founded the fundamentalist Free Presbyterian Church of Ulster. Paisley and the DUP spearheaded the Save Ulster from Sodomy campaign during the 1970s to oppose efforts to decriminalise homosexuality in Northern Ireland. The influence of the Free Presbyterian Church over DUP policies has been described as leading to a theocratic regime in Northern Ireland. 30.6% of DUP members are Free Presybyterians compared to 0.6% of the overall Northern Ireland population.

Several DUP figures have attracted media attention for homophobic remarks. Health Minister Jim Wells was widely criticised after claiming children brought up in same-sex relationships were more likely to be abused or neglected; he was forced to resign shortly thereafter. Paisley's son Ian Paisley Jr stated he was "repulsed" by homosexuality. In 2008, Iris Robinson, the wife of then-First Minister Peter Robinson, recommended conversion therapy, and called homosexuality "disgusting, loathsome, nauseating, wicked, and vile." She also implied that homosexuality was worse than child abuse. As First Minister, her husband Peter Robinson defended the views of those who thought homosexuality should be illegal and stated that if homosexuality became a criminal offence again, he would expect people to follow the law.

In 2016, Robinson's successor as leader Arlene Foster promised that the DUP would use the petition of concern to veto same-sex marriage for the next five years. The party's use of the petition of concern for this purpose was described as "a mean-spirited abuse" of power-sharing arrangements by The New York Times and contrary to the Good Friday Agreement by Amnesty International.

In 2018, Foster addressed a PinkNews reception in Belfast, becoming the first DUP leader to attend an LGBT event. Foster stated that despite her staunch opposition to same-sex marriage, she valued the contribution of the LGBT community in Northern Ireland and requested that differing views be respected.

The party ran its first openly gay candidate at the 2019 Northern Ireland local elections, with Alison Bennington winning a seat in the Glengormley Urban area of Antrim and Newtownabbey Borough Council. It drew a mixed response within the party, with Jim Wells expressing shock about a "watershed change" made without consulting party members while Gavin Robinson said Bennington's election was a "good news story".

In 2021 Foster was forced to resign as party leader, with The Guardian reporting that her softening opposition to LGBT rights (such as abstaining rather than opposing the conversion therapy ban) was a contributing factor. She was replaced by the socially conservative Edwin Poots, who announced he wanted to work for all people in Northern Ireland regardless of their background. After 21 days he was himself replaced by Jeffrey Donaldson, who also had a history of opposing LGBT rights.

On 1 July 2021 DUP deputy leader Paula Bradley apologised for the "absolutely atrocious" statements made by the party's politicians about LGBT people over the past 50 years. Her apology was supported by DUP leader Donaldson. In September 2021 Donaldson met with the Rainbow Project, the first such meeting between a DUP leader and an LGBT group.

==== Ulster Unionist Party ====
Historically, the Ulster Unionist Party has opposed LGBT rights such as same-sex marriage but in recent years has changed many of its stances and attempted to cultivate support among gay voters. LGBT rights activist Jeff Dudgeon was urged to renounce his UUP membership over the party's continued opposition to same-sex marriage, but refused to do so, stating he was happy with civil partnerships for same-sex couples. In its 2015 election manifesto, the UUP promised it would respect people from all sexualities.

Then-UUP member Ken Maginnis created a media controversy after he equated homosexuality with bestiality in an interview on BBC Northern Ireland's Stephen Nolan show in June 2012. His comments prompted the party leader, Mike Nesbitt, to state that Maginnis expressed his views in a personal capacity and did not reflect party policy. Later that month, Maginnis was demoted as UUP party whip over his comments at the behest of Nesbitt; he subsequently resigned from the UUP on 28 August 2012.

In recent years, prominent UUP members have moderated their stances on LGBT rights and called for a more inclusive society towards sexual minorities. In 2021, UUP MLAs including former leaders Mike Nesbitt and Doug Beattie attended the gay pride parade in Belfast.

In April 2021, UUP MLAs tabled a motion in Stormont to ban gay conversion therapy which was supported by MLAs from other parties. In May 2021, UUP member and leadership contender Doug Beattie stated that as leader he would aim to reach out to all people in Northern Ireland "regardless of what your religion is, sexual orientation or ethnicity" and upon winning the leadership election pledged to take a more socially progressive policy stance on the matter. Some UUP MLAs including Andy Allen have voted in favour of same-sex marriage.

==== Traditional Unionist Voice ====
The sole member of the Traditional Unionist Voice (TUV), Jim Allister is a hardline opponent of LGBT rights, having opposed the decriminalisation of homosexuality in the 1980s, and was the only Northern Ireland Assembly member to oppose an Alan Turing Law to pardon people convicted or cautioned under earlier anti-LGBT laws. In the TUV's 2015 manifesto (before the legalisation of same-sex marriage in Northern Ireland in January 2020) it stated that it, "oppose[s] any redefinition of marriage" and "defend[s] traditional family values ... believing that that is the bedrock for the success of society".

=== Nationalist/Republican ===
==== Sinn Féin ====
Sinn Féin's position on LGBT rights has evolved to one of strong support, including support for same-sex marriage in 2012. The party's 2015 manifesto was the only one in Northern Ireland to expressly mention support for the rights of transgender people.

==== Social Democratic and Labour Party ====
The Social Democratic and Labour Party has expressed its support for LGBT rights including same-sex marriage. It was the first political party to put a motion to the Northern Ireland Assembly in favour of same-sex marriage.

=== Cross-community ===
==== Alliance Party ====
The non-sectarian Alliance Party of Northern Ireland has expressed its support for LGBT rights including same-sex marriage. The party amended its platform to support same-sex marriage in 2012.

==== Green Party ====
The Green Party in Northern Ireland was the first party to come out in support of same-sex marriage in 2012 and drafted Northern Ireland's first LGBT-specific manifesto for the 2016 Assembly elections. The party also made history by running Northern Ireland's first ever transgender candidate for an election.

==== People Before Profit ====
People Before Profit has expressed its support for LGBT rights.

== Summary table ==
| Same-sex sexual activity legal | Yes (Since 1982) |
| Equal age of consent (16) | Yes (Since 2001) |
| Anti-discrimination laws in employment | Yes (Since 2003) |
| Anti-discrimination laws in the provision of goods and services | Yes (Since 2007) |
| Anti-discrimination laws concerning gender identity | Yes / No (Protection for "gender reassignment" only in education or vocational training since 1999) |
| Hate crime law includes sexual orientation | Yes (Since 2004) |
| Hate speech law includes sexual orientation | Yes (Since 2004) |
| Same-sex marriage(s) | Yes (Since 2020) |
| Recognition of same-sex couples (e.g. civil partnership) | Yes (Since 2005, UK-wide) |
| Stepchild adoption by same-sex couples | Yes (Since 2013) |
| Joint adoption by same-sex couples | Yes (Since 2013) |
| LGBT people allowed to serve in the military | Yes (Since 2000, UK-wide) |
| Right to change legal gender | Yes (Since 2004, UK-wide) |
| Gender self-identification | No |
| Legal recognition of non-binary gender | No |
| Access to IVF for lesbians | Yes (Since 2009) |
| Altruistic surrogacy for gay male couples | Yes (Since 2008, UK-wide) |
| Automatic parenthood on birth certificates for children of same-sex couples | Yes (Since 2009) |
| Conversion therapy outlawed | No (Proposed) |
| Expungement scheme or pardon law implemented | Yes (Since 2018) |
| LGBTQ education in secondary schools | No |
| MSMs allowed to donate blood | Yes (Since 2021, UK-wide no waiting period for monogamous gay and bi men and 3 months waiting period for non-monogamous gay and bi men) |
| Legal recognition of intersex people | No |
| Intersex human rights | No |

== See also ==
- Rainbow Project
- Cara-Friend
- Equality Network
- LGBT Network
- LGBTQ rights in the United Kingdom
  - LGBTQ rights in Wales
  - LGBTQ rights in Scotland
- LGBTQ rights in the Republic of Ireland
- LGBTQ rights by country
