= Same-sex marriage in Northern Ireland =

Same-sex marriage has been legal in Northern Ireland since 13 January 2020, following the enactment of the Northern Ireland (Executive Formation etc) Act 2019. The first marriage ceremony took place on 11 February 2020. Civil partnerships have also been available for same-sex couples in Northern Ireland since their introduction by the Government of the United Kingdom in 2005.

Between 2012 and 2015, the Northern Ireland Assembly voted five times on same-sex marriage, and although it was passed by a slim majority on the fifth attempt, it was vetoed by the Democratic Unionist Party using the petition of concern. Following the inconclusive 2017 Assembly election and failure to form a Northern Ireland Executive by the deadline of 21 October 2019, provisions in the Northern Ireland (Executive Formation etc) Act 2019 mandating same-sex marriage by 13 January 2020 took effect. Regulations implementing same-sex marriage were signed by Julian Smith, the Secretary of State for Northern Ireland, on 19 December 2019. The politician who introduced the 13 January 2020 deadline into the legislation, Baron Hayward, did so in order to allow enough time to update all legislation impacted by the change, such as pension rights and parental responsibilities. Marriages of same-sex couples became legally recognised on 13 January 2020, with couples free to register their intent to marry and couples who had previously married elsewhere having their unions recognised from that date.

== Civil partnerships ==
=== Legislative action ===
Civil partnerships (Irish: páirtnéireacht shibhialta, pronounced [ˈpˠaːɾˠtʲnʲeːɾʲəxt̪ˠ ˈhɪvʲiəl̪ˠt̪ˠə]; Ulster Scots: ceevil pairtnerie) have been available to same-sex couples in Northern Ireland since 2005, following the passage of the Civil Partnership Act 2004 in the Parliament of the United Kingdom. The Act gives same-sex couples most, but not all, of the same rights and responsibilities as civil marriage. Civil partners are entitled to the same property rights as married opposite-sex couples, the same exemption as married couples on inheritance tax, social security and pension benefits, and also the ability to receive parental responsibility for a partner's children, as well as responsibility for reasonable maintenance of one's partner and their children, tenancy rights, full life insurance recognition, next of kin rights in hospitals, and others. There is a formal process for dissolving partnerships akin to divorce. Civil partnerships can be conducted by religious organisations in England, Wales and Scotland but not in Northern Ireland.

Civil partnerships were opened to different-sex couples following the passage of the Marriage (Same-sex Couples) and Civil Partnership (Opposite-sex Couples) (Northern Ireland) Regulations 2019.

=== Statistics ===
According to the Northern Ireland Statistics and Research Agency (NISRA), 1,495 same-sex civil partnerships were performed in Northern Ireland between 2005 and 2021, mostly between lesbian couples. Most civil partnerships were conducted in Belfast (804), the city accounting for about half of all Northern Irish partnerships, followed by Derry City and Strabane (133), Newry, Mourne and Down (116), Ards and North Down (101), Mid and East Antrim (89), Lisburn and Castlereagh (67), Fermanagh and Omagh (50), Armagh City, Banbridge and Craigavon (46), Antrim and Newtownabbey (39), Causeway Coast and Glens (34), and Mid Ulster (16). In 2015, the average age for men entering into civil partnerships was 33.8, whereas for women it was 36.8 (34.3 and 32.2 respectively for married opposite-sex partners). There were seven partnership dissolutions in 2015 (five to male couples and two to lesbian couples), compared to 2,360 divorces.

== Same-sex marriage ==
Laws regarding same-sex partnerships in Europe¹ Marriage Civil union Limited domestic recognition (cohabitation) Unrecognized Constitution limits marriage to opposite-sex couples ¹ May include recent laws or court decisions that have not yet entered into effect.

=== Assembly proposals ===
Marriage in Northern Ireland is subject to laws in force at the time. There is no obligation for either of those being married to belong to a religious denomination, or for the marriage to be carried out by a religious institution, but marriages carried out in the prescribed form by a religious denomination and registered by an authorised celebrant are recognised by the state. Legislation to allow for the recognition of same-sex marriages in Northern Ireland was debated five times in the Northern Ireland Assembly between 2012 and 2015. On the first four of those occasions, only a minority of Assembly members voted in favour of same-sex marriage, though the last vote on the issue in November 2015 saw a majority of MLAs vote in favour of same-sex marriage.

On 1 October 2012, the first Northern Ireland Assembly motion regarding same-sex marriage was introduced by Sinn Féin and the Greens. The motion was defeated 45–50. On 29 April 2013, a second attempt to introduce same-sex marriage was defeated by the Assembly 42–53, with the Democratic Unionist Party (DUP) and the Ulster Unionist Party (UUP) voting against and Sinn Féin, the Social Democratic and Labour Party (SDLP), the Alliance Party, and the Green Party voting in favour. A third attempt on 29 April 2014 was defeated 43–51, with all nationalist MLAs (Sinn Féin and SDLP), most Alliance MPs and four unionists (two from NI21 and two from the UUP) voting in favour. The remaining unionists (DUP, UUP, UKIP and Traditional Unionist Voice) and two Alliance MLAs voted against. A fourth attempt on 27 April 2015 also failed, 47–49. Again, Sinn Féin, SDLP and five Alliance members voted in favour, while the DUP and all but four of the UUP members (who were granted a conscience vote) voted against.

On 2 November 2015, the Northern Ireland Assembly voted for a fifth time on the question of legalising same-sex marriage. Of the 105 legislators who voted, 53 were in favour and 52 against, the first time a majority of the Assembly had ever voted in favour of same-sex marriage. However, the DUP again tabled a petition of concern signed by 32 members, preventing the motion from having any legal effect. Sinn Féin said that legislation regarding same-sex marriage would be a priority for the party in the Assembly elected in May 2016. On 23 June 2016, Finance Minister Máirtín Ó Muilleoir announced he had requested that officials in the Executive begin drafting legislation to allow same-sex marriage, stating that MLAs would much rather vote on the issue than "be forced to legislate [following] an adverse judgment" in the courts. In October 2016, First Minister Arlene Foster reaffirmed the DUP's opposition to same-sex marriage, saying the party would continue to issue a petition of concern blocking same-sex marriage in the Assembly over the next five years. The DUP won fewer than 30 seats at the March 2017 elections, losing the ability to singlehandedly block a bill using a petition of concern. The Assembly failed to reconvene for nearly three years following the election, with same-sex marriage and other issues being sources of disagreement between the major parties.

2 November 2015 vote in the Assembly
Party	Voted for	Voted against	Abstained	Absent (Did not vote)
Democratic Unionist Party	–	38: Sydney Anderson; Jonathan Bell; Paula Bradley; Thomas Buchanan; Pam Cameron; Gregory Campbell; Trevor Clarke; Jonathan Craig; Sammy Douglas; Gordon Dunne; Alex Easton; Arlene Foster; Paul Frew; Paul Girvan; Paul Givan; Brenda Hale; Simon Hamilton; David Hilditch; William Humphrey; William Irwin; Emma Little-Pengelly; Gordon Lyons; Nelson McCausland; Ian McCrea; David McIlveen; Michelle McIlveen; Adrian McQuillan; Gary Middleton; Maurice Morrow; Stephen Moutray; Robin Newton; Edwin Poots; George Robinson; Peter Robinson; Alastair Ross; Mervyn Storey; Peter Weir; Jim Wells	–	–
Sinn Féin	28: Cathal Boylan; Michaela Boyle; Megan Fearon; Phil Flanagan; Chris Hazzard; Gerry Kelly; Seán Lynch; Alex Maskey; Declan McAleer; Fra McCann; Jennifer McCann; Raymond McCartney; Rosie McCorley; Barry McElduff; Bronwyn McGahan; Martin McGuinness; Daithí McKay; Maeve McLaughlin; Oliver McMullan; Ian Milne; Conor Murphy; Carál Ní Chuilín; Cathal Ó hOisín; Máirtín Ó Muilleoir; John O'Dowd; Michelle O'Neill; Caitríona Ruane; Pat Sheehan	–	–	–
Social Democratic and Labour Party	13: Alex Attwood; Dominic Bradley; Joe Byrne; John Dallat; Mark H. Durkan; Colum Eastwood; Claire Hanna; Dolores Kelly; Patsy McGlone; Karen McKevitt; Fearghal McKinney; Pat Ramsey; Seán Rogers	–	–	1: Alban Maginness
Ulster Unionist Party	1: Andy Allen	11: Roy Beggs Jr; Adrian Cochrane-Watson; Leslie Cree; Jo-Anne Dobson; Sam Gardiner; Ross Hussey; Danny Kennedy; Michael McGimpsey; Sandra Overend; Neil Somerville; Robin Swann	1: Mike Nesbitt	–
Alliance Party of Northern Ireland	7: Judith Cochrane; Stewart Dickson; Stephen Farry; David Ford; Anna Lo; Trevor Lunn; Chris Lyttle	1: Kieran McCarthy	–	–
Green Party Northern Ireland	1: Steven Agnew	–	–	–
NI21	1: Basil McCrea	–	–	–
Traditional Unionist Voice	–	1: Jim Allister	–	–
UK Independence Party	–	1: David McNarry	–	–
Independent	2: John McCallister; Claire Sugden	–	–	–
Total (Note: The Assembly has 107 voting members. The Speaker of the Northern Ireland Assembly, Mitchel McLaughlin, votes only in case of a tied vote.)	53	52	1	1
Total	49.5%	48.6%	0.9%	0.9%

=== British Parliament bills ===
Map of constituencies showing how each of their MPs voted on the amendment extending same-sex marriage to Northern Ireland, 9 July 2019 Labour/Scottish National/Liberal Democrat/Change UK/Plaid Cymru/Green/Independent votes for: 278 (+2 tellers) Conservative votes for: 104 Conservative votes for both: 1 Conservative/Democratic Unionist votes against: 72 (+2 tellers) Absent/Non-voting/Abstentionist votes: 190 Seat vacant: 1

==== 2018 proposals ====
Karen Bradley, the Secretary of State for Northern Ireland, said in February 2018 that same-sex marriage could be legislated for in Northern Ireland by the Parliament of the United Kingdom, and that the government would likely allow a conscience vote for its MPs if such legislation was introduced. Labour MP Conor McGinn said he would introduce a private member's bill extending same-sex marriage to Northern Ireland by the end of March 2018. Legislation to legalise same-sex marriage was introduced to the House of Commons on 28 March 2018, and passed its first reading. The bill's second reading in the Commons was blocked by Conservative MP Christopher Chope on 11 May 2018, and again on 26 October, and was rescheduled for debate on 23 November 2018, before being again rescheduled to 25 January 2019. An identical bill was introduced to the House of Lords on 27 March 2018 by Baron Hayward, and passed its first reading that day, though without government support.

On 1 November 2018, royal assent was granted to the Northern Ireland (Executive Formation and Exercise of Functions) Act 2018, which contained sections describing Northern Ireland's same-sex marriage and abortion bans as human rights violations. The law did not legalise same-sex marriage in Northern Ireland, but directed the British Government to "issue guidance" to civil servants in Northern Ireland "in relation to the incompatibility of human rights with [the region's laws on the two issues]". The law passed 207–117 in the House of Commons.

==== 2019 legalisation by Parliament ====
In March 2019, Baron Hayward introduced an amendment to an unrelated government bill, which if accepted would have extended same-sex marriage to Northern Ireland. Baroness Williams of Trafford opposed the amendment and said the UK Government preferred to have the Northern Ireland Assembly legalise same-sex marriage. Hayward withdrew it, stating that he and other Lords "made a tactical withdrawal today, but we will be back, this time to win".

In July 2019, McGinn announced his intention to attach an amendment to an upcoming Northern Ireland administrative bill, which would legalise same-sex marriage three months after passage of the bill if the Northern Ireland Assembly remained suspended. Under the terms of the originally-drafted amendment, the region's executive could approve or repeal the measure upon resumption. The amendment passed on 9 July in the House of Commons with 383 votes in favour and 73 votes against. McGinn's amendment, which was further amended by Lord Hayward during passage in the House of Lords on 17 July, was approved without a formal vote. It required the Secretary of State to issue regulations extending same-sex marriage to Northern Ireland if the Executive had not reconvened by 21 October 2019. If this occurred, then the regulations would come into effect on 13 January 2020. Lord Hayward's amendment was approved in the House of Commons with 328 votes in favour and 65 votes against on 18 July. The bill passed its final stages in the Parliament and received royal assent by Queen Elizabeth II on 24 July 2019, becoming the Northern Ireland (Executive Formation etc) Act 2019.

9 July 2019 vote in the House of Commons
Party	Voted for	Voted against	Absent (Did not vote)
G Conservative Party	105: Stuart Andrew; Victoria Atkins; Harriett Baldwin; Guto Bebb; Richard Benyon; Crispin Blunt; Peter Bottomley; Andrew Bowie; Graham Brady; Steve Brine; Alistair Burt; Maria Caulfield; Alex Chalk; Greg Clark; Kenneth Clarke; Damian Collins; Tracey Crouch; David T. C. Davies; Mims Davies; Caroline Dinenage; Jonathan Djanogly; Michael Fabricant; Mark Field; Vicky Ford; Lucy Frazer; Mike Freer; Mark Garnier; Nus Ghani; Nick Gibb; Michael Gove; Luke Graham; Richard Graham; Helen Grant; Chris Green; Damian Green; Justine Greening; Andrew Griffiths; Sam Gyimah; Robert Halfon; Luke Hall; Stephen Hammond; Matt Hancock; Richard Harrington; Trudy Harrison; Simon Hart; Chris Heaton-Harris; Peter Heaton-Jones; Gordon Henderson; Nick Herbert; Andrea Jenkyns; Andrew Jones; Marcus Jones; Daniel Kawczynski; Gillian Keegan; Julian Knight; Andrea Leadsom; Oliver Letwin; Ian Liddell-Grainger; Jack Lopresti; Tim Loughton; Rachel Maclean; Alan Mak; Kit Malthouse; Scott Mann; Paul Masterton; Patrick McLoughlin; Huw Merriman; Stephen Metcalfe; Maria Miller; Nigel Mills (Note: MP Nigel Mills voted both "aye" and "no", likely as a means of registering an abstention.); Anne Milton; Andrew Mitchell; Penny Mordaunt; Nicky Morgan; David Mundell; Sarah Newton; Caroline Nokes; Neil O'Brien; Guy Opperman; John Penrose; Andrew Percy; Chris Philp; Dan Poulter; Tom Pursglove; Will Quince; Amber Rudd; Antoinette Sandbach; Bob Seely; Alec Shelbrooke; Chris Skidmore; Nicholas Soames; Andrew Stephenson; Bob Stewart; Iain Stewart; Julian Sturdy; Ross Thomson; Justin Tomlinson; Liz Truss; Tom Tugendhat; Ed Vaizey; Matt Warman; Giles Watling; Mike Wood; William Wragg; Nadhim Zahawi	65: David Amess; Steve Baker; Henry Bellingham; Paul Beresford; Bob Blackman; Peter Bone; Suella Braverman; Andrew Bridgen; James Brokenshire; Fiona Bruce; James Cartlidge; Bill Cash; Rehman Chishti; Christopher Chope; Simon Clarke; Thérèse Coffey; Philip Davies; David Davis; Steve Double; Richard Drax; David Duguid; George Eustice; Kevin Foster; Roger Gale; Robert Goodwill; James Gray; Kirstene Hair; Mark Harper; John Hayes; Kevin Hollinrake; Philip Hollobone; Adam Holloway; John Howell; Eddie Hughes; Caroline Johnson; David Jones; Stephen Kerr; Greg Knight; John Lamont; Pauline Latham; Jeremy Lefroy; Edward Leigh; Andrew Lewer; Anne Main; Nigel Mills; David Morris; Matthew Offord; Owen Paterson; Mike Penning; Mark Prisk; Mark Prithcard; Jacob Rees-Mogg; Laurence Robertson; Mary Robinson; Andrew Rosindell; Douglas Ross; John Stevenson; Gary Streeter; Desmond Swayne; Robert Syms; Derek Thomas; Michael Tomlinson; Martin Vickers; Heather Wheeler; Bill Wiggin	142: Nigel Adams; Bim Afolami; Adam Afriyie; Peter Aldous; Lucy Allan; Edward Argar; Richard Bacon; Kemi Badenoch; Steve Barclay; John Baron; Jake Berry; Ben Bradley; Karen Bradley; Jack Brereton; Robert Buckland; Alex Burghart; Conor Burns; Alun Cairns; Jo Churchill; Colin Clark; James Cleverly; Geoffrey Clifton-Brown; Alberto Costa; Robert Courts; Geoffrey Cox; Stephen Crabb; Glyn Davies; Leo Docherty; Michelle Donelan; Nadine Dorries; Oliver Dowden; Jackie Doyle-Price; James Duddridge; Alan Duncan; Iain Duncan Smith; Philip Dunne; Michael Ellis; Tobias Ellwood; Charlie Elphicke; Nigel Evans; David Evennett; Michael Fallon; Liam Fox; Mark Francois; George Freeman; Marcus Fysh; David Gauke; Cheryl Gillan; John Glen; Zac Goldsmith; Bill Grant; Chris Grayling; Dominic Grieve; Philip Hammond; Greg Hands; Rebecca Harris; Oliver Heald; James Heappey; Damian Hinds; Simon Hoare; George Hollingbery; Nigel Huddleston; Jeremy Hunt; Nick Hurd; Alister Jack; Margot James; Sajid Javid; Ranil Jayawardena; Bernard Jenkin; Robert Jenrick; Boris Johnson; Gareth Johnson; Jo Johnson; Seema Kennedy; Kwasi Kwarteng; Mark Lancaster; Phillip Lee; Brandon Lewis; Julian Lewis; David Lidington; Julia Lopez; Jonathan Lord; Craig Mackinlay; Theresa May; Paul Maynard; Stephen McPartland; Esther McVey; Mark Menzies; Johnny Mercer; Amanda Milling; Damien Moore; Anne Marie Morris; James Morris; Wendy Morton; Sheryll Murray; Andrew Murrison; Bob Neill; Jesse Norman; Neil Parish; Priti Patel; Mark Pawsey; Claire Perry O'Neill; Chris Pincher; Rebecca Pow; Victoria Prentis; Jeremy Quin; Dominic Raab; John Redwood; Lee Rowley; David Rutley; Paul Scully; Andrew Selous; Grant Shapps; Alok Sharma; Keith Simpson; Chloe Smith; Henry Smith; Julian Smith; Royston Smith; Caroline Spelman; Mark Spencer; Rory Stewart; Mel Stride; Graham Stuart; Rishi Sunak; Hugo Swire; Maggie Throup; Kelly Tolhurst; Craig Tracey; David Tredinnick; Anne-Marie Trevelyan; Shailesh Vara; Theresa Villiers; Charles Walker; Robin Walker; Ben Wallace; David Warburton; Helen Whately; Craig Whittaker; John Whittingdale; Gavin Williamson; Jeremy Wright
Labour Party	222: Diane Abbott; Debbie Abrahams; Rushanara Ali; Rosena Allin-Khan; Mike Amesbury; Tonia Antoniazzi; Jonathan Ashworth; Adrian Bailey; Kevin Barron; Margaret Beckett; Hilary Benn; Clive Betts; Roberta Blackman-Woods; Paul Blomfield; Tracy Brabin; Ben Bradshaw; Kevin Brennan; Lyn Brown; Nick Brown; Chris Bryant; Karen Buck; Richard Burden; Richard Burgon; Dawn Butler; Liam Byrne; Ruth Cadbury; Alan Campbell; Ronnie Campbell; Dan Carden; Sarah Champion; Jenny Chapman; Bambos Charalambous; Ann Clwyd; Vernon Coaker; Julie Cooper; Rosie Cooper; Yvette Cooper; Jeremy Corbyn; Neil Coyle; David Crausby; Mary Creagh; Stella Creasy; Jon Cruddas; John Cryer; Judith Cummins; Alex Cunningham; Jim Cunningham; Janet Daby; Nic Dakin; Wayne David; Marsha de Cordova; Gloria De Piero; Thangam Debbonaire; Emma Dent Coad; Tan Dhesi; Anneliese Dodds; Stephen Doughty; Peter Dowd; David Drew; Jack Dromey; Rosie Duffield; Angela Eagle; Maria Eagle; Clive Efford; Julie Elliott; Louise Ellman; Bill Esterson; Chris Evans; Paul Farrelly; Jim Fitzpatrick; Colleen Fletcher; Caroline Flint; Lisa Forbes; Yvonne Fovargue; Vicky Foxcroft; James Frith; Gill Furniss; Hugh Gaffney; Barry Gardiner; Ruth George; Preet Kaur Gill; Roger Godsiff; Kate Green; Lilian Greenwood; Margaret Greenwood; Nia Griffith; John Grogan; Andrew Gwynne; Louise Haigh; Fabian Hamilton; David Hanson; Emma Hardy; Harriet Harman; Carolyn Harris; Helen Hayes; Sue Hayman; John Healey; Stephen Hepburn; Mike Hill; Meg Hillier; Margaret Hodge; Sharon Hodgson; Kate Hollern; Rupa Huq; Imran Hussain; Dan Jarvis; Diana Johnson; Darren Jones; Gerald Jones; Helen Jones; Kevan Jones; Sarah Jones; Susan Elan Jones; Mike Kane; Barbara Keeley; Liz Kendall; Afzal Khan; Ged Killen; Stephen Kinnock; Peter Kyle; Lesley Laird; Ian Lavery; Karen Lee; Emma Lewell-Buck; Clive Lewis; Tony Lloyd; Rebecca Long-Bailey; Ian Lucas; Holly Lynch; Justin Madders; Khalid Mahmood; Seema Malhotra; Gordon Marsden; Sandy Martin; Chris Matheson; Steve McCabe; Kerry McCarthy; Siobhain McDonagh; Andy McDonald; John McDonnell; Pat McFadden; Conor McGinn; Alison McGovern; Liz McInnes; Catherine McKinnell; Jim McMahon; Anna McMorrin; Ian Mearns; Madeleine Moon; Jessica Morden; Stephen Morgan; Grahame Morris; Ian Murray; Lisa Nandy; Alex Norris; Melanie Onn; Chi Onwurah; Kate Osamor; Albert Owen; Stephanie Peacock; Teresa Pearce; Matthew Pennycook; Toby Perkins; Jess Phillips; Bridget Phillipson; Laura Pidcock; Jo Platt; Luke Pollard; Lucy Powell; Yasmin Qureshi; Angela Rayner; Steve Reed; Christina Rees; Ellie Reeves; Rachel Reeves; Emma Reynolds; Jonathan Reynolds; Marie Rimmer; Geoffrey Robinson; Matt Rodda; Danielle Rowley; Chris Ruane; Naz Shah; Virendra Sharma; Barry Sheerman; Paula Sherriff; Tulip Siddiq; Dennis Skinner; Andy Slaughter; Ruth Smeeth; Cat Smith; Eleanor Smith; Jeff Smith; Laura Smith; Owen Smith; Karin Smyth; Gareth Snell; Alex Sobel; John Spellar; Keir Starmer; Jo Stevens; Wes Streeting; Graham Stringer; Paul Sweeney; Mark Tami; Nick Thomas-Symonds; Gareth Thomas; Emily Thornberry; Stephen Timms; Anna Turley; Karl Turner; Stephen Twigg; Liz Twist; Valerie Vaz; Thelma Walker; Matt Western; Alan Whitehead; Martin Whitfield; Paul Williams; Phil Wilson; Mohammad Yasin; Daniel Zeichner	–	21: Geraint Davies; Mary Glindon; Helen Goodman; Mark Hendrick; Kate Hoey; George Howarth; Graham Jones; Ruth Jones; David Lammy; Shabana Mahmood; John Mann; Rachael Maskell; Ed Miliband; Stephen Pound; Faisal Rashid; Lloyd Russell-Moyle; Jon Trickett; Derek Twigg; Keith Vaz; Tom Watson; Catherine West
Scottish National Party	25: Hannah Bardell; Mhairi Black; Ian Blackford; Kirsty Blackman; Deidre Brock; Alan Brown; Lisa Cameron; Joanna Cherry; Ronnie Cowan; Angela Crawley; Martyn Day; Martin Docherty-Hughes; Stephen Gethins; Peter Grant; Neil Gray; Drew Hendry; Stewart Hosie; Chris Law; Stewart McDonald; Stuart McDonald; John McNally; Tommy Sheppard; Chris Stephens; Alison Thewliss; Pete Wishart	–	10: Douglas Chapman; Marion Fellows; Patricia Gibson; Patrick Grady; David Linden; Angus MacNeil; Carol Monaghan; Gavin Newlands; Brendan O'Hara; Philippa Whitford
Liberal Democrats	10: Vince Cable; Alistair Carmichael; Ed Davey; Wera Hobhouse; Christine Jardine; Norman Lamb; Layla Moran; Jamie Stone; Jo Swinson; Chuka Umunna	–	2: Tom Brake; Tim Farron
Democratic Unionist Party	–	8: Gregory Campbell; Nigel Dodds; Paul Girvan; Emma Little-Pengelly; Ian Paisley Jr; Jim Shannon; David Simpson; Sammy Wilson	–
Sinn Féin	–	–	7: Órfhlaith Begley; Mickey Brady; Michelle Gildernew; Chris Hazzard; Paul Maskey; Elisha McCallion; Francie Molloy
Change UK	4: Ann Coffey; Mike Gapes; Chris Leslie; Joan Ryan	–	1: Anna Soubry
The Independents	5: Heidi Allen; Luciana Berger; Gavin Shuker; Angela Smith; John Woodcock	–	–
Plaid Cymru	4: Jonathan Edwards; Ben Lake; Liz Saville Roberts; Hywel Williams	–	–
Green Party of England and Wales	1: Caroline Lucas	–	–
Independent	7: Ian Austin; Nick Boles; Sylvia Hermon; Kelvin Hopkins; Stephen Lloyd; Chris Williamson; Sarah Wollaston	–	3: Frank Field; Eleanor Laing; Jared O'Mara
Total (Note: The Speaker of the House of Commons, John Bercow, votes only in case of a tied vote. The three deputy speakers, Lindsay Hoyle, Eleanor Laing and Rosie Winterton, likewise did not cast a vote. The tellers for the "aye" side were Chris Elmore and Nick Smith, while those for the "no" side were Jeffrey Donaldson and Gavin Robinson. Additionally, the Brecon and Radnorshire constituency was vacant following Chris Davies' removal from office the previous month.)	383	73	186
Total	59.7%	11.4%	29.0%

==== Attempted recall of Assembly and commencement ====
On 21 October 2019, the Democratic Unionist Party and the Traditional Unionist Voice petitioned to call the Assembly back into session for the first time in nearly three years. However, Sinn Féin, the Alliance Party, the Greens and People Before Profit announced their abstention from the Assembly, and the Social Democratic and Labour Party walked out of the Assembly session, leading to the absence of all nationalist MLAs and the lack of a cross-community quorum for electing a new speaker. Incumbent Speaker Robin Newton refused to suspend the rules to allow an anti-abortion bill and a potential anti-same-sex marriage bill to be brought to a floor vote, leading the DUP to walk out of the Assembly and end the session. As a result, the British Parliament deadline for overturning the introduction of same-sex marriage in Northern Ireland under the Northern Ireland (Executive Formation etc) Act 2019 passed at midnight on 21 October 2019, with abortion becoming legal and the Secretary of State required to issue regulations extending same-sex marriage to Northern Ireland. The Marriage (Same-sex Couples) and Civil Partnership (Opposite-sex Couples) (Northern Ireland) Regulations 2019 were signed by Secretary of State Julian Smith on 19 December 2019 and came into effect on 13 January 2020. The regulations contain a provision stating that:

In the law of Northern Ireland, marriage has the same effect in relation to same-sex couples as it has in relation to opposite-sex couples. (Note: Irish: I ndlí Thuaisceart Éireann, tá an éifeacht chéanna ag pósadh i gcás lánúin chomhghnéis agus atá aige i gcás lánúin den ghnéas eile.)

The first same-sex couple to legally marry in Northern Ireland were Robyn Peoples and Sharni Edwards-Peoples on 11 February 2020 in Belfast. Connor Phillips and Shane Robinson were the first male couple to marry on 12 February in Newcastle, County Down. Regulations to enable those in civil partnerships to convert their relationship status to marriage were laid in Parliament on 22 October 2020, with the first conversions taking place from 7 December 2020.

=== Court cases ===
==== Access to same-sex marriage ====
Two legal challenges to Northern Ireland's same-sex marriage ban were heard in the High Court in November and December 2015. Two couples, Grainne Close and Shannon Sickles and Chris and Henry Flanagan-Kanem, brought the case claiming that Northern Ireland's prohibition on same-sex marriage breached their human rights. The case was heard simultaneously with a case brought in January 2015 in which two men who had wed in England sought to have their marriage recognised in Northern Ireland. A ruling was handed down in August 2017; Judge John Ailbe O'Hara of the High Court found against the couples and determined that there were no grounds under case law from the European Court of Human Rights that the couples' rights were violated by Northern Ireland's refusal to recognise their union as a marriage and that same-sex marriage was a matter of social policy for the Parliament to decide rather than the judiciary.

One of the couples involved in the litigation (who were granted anonymity) said they would appeal the ruling. The appeal was heard by a three-judge panel of the Court of Appeal on 16 March 2018; a ruling had been expected some time in 2019. On 7 April 2020, the Court of Appeal in Belfast ruled that same-sex couples faced unjustified discrimination while denied the opportunity to marry in Northern Ireland. But with changes to the law meaning same-sex weddings can take place in Northern Ireland since 11 February 2020, senior judges decided not to make a formal declaration on any human rights breach.

==== Conversion of civil partnerships ====
In 2019, two same-sex couples indicated they would sue the UK Government over bureaucratic obstacles that may have forced them to wait two years before being capable of converting their civil partnerships into marriages. The issue was rectified by further regulations which came into effect in December 2020.

=== Statistics ===
158 same-sex marriages were performed in Northern Ireland in 2020. This constituted 4.2 per cent of the total number of marriages performed in Northern Ireland during that period. 396 same-sex marriages were conducted in 2021, followed by 266 in 2022, 318 in 2023, and 255 in 2024.

Number of marriages performed in Northern Ireland
Year	Same-sex marriages			Opposite-sex marriages	Total marriages	% same-sex
Year	Female	Male	Total	Opposite-sex marriages	Total marriages	% same-sex
2020	84	74	158	3,566	3,724	4.24%
2021	240	156	396	7,525	7,921	5.00%
2022	150	116	266	8,298	8,564	3.11%
2023	189	129	318	7,176	7,494	4.24%
2024	150	105	255	6,996	7,251	3.52%

=== Religious performance ===
The main religious denominations in Northern Ireland define marriage as between "one man and one woman", and do not support or bless same-sex marriages. The majority of marriages in Northern Ireland are also conducted by religious denominations, e.g. 4,407 out of 7,255 marriage ceremonies in 2019 (61%). Under the Marriage (Northern Ireland) Order 2003, an officiant shall not solemnise a religious marriage "except in accordance with a form of ceremony which is recognised by the religious body of which he is a member" and which "includes and is in no way inconsistent with" an appropriate declaration i.e. that they accept each other as spouses in the presence of each other, the officiant, and two witnesses. A religious body is defined in legislation as "an organised group of people meeting regularly for common religious worship". Marriage ceremonies of same-sex couples in religious facilities became permitted on 1 September 2020, after subsidiary legislation was passed by the Northern Ireland Office. The legislation contains exemptions and protections for religious bodies and officiants that do not wish to conduct same-sex marriages. The first religious same-sex marriage ceremony was performed on 12 December 2020 in Carrickfergus, County Antrim. The officiant was Pastor Steve Ames of the Harbour Faith Community. The Quakers in Northern Ireland are the only mainstream church in Northern Ireland that performs same-sex marriages. In 2018, a motion supporting and allowing such marriages in their meeting houses was passed at an annual yearly meeting held in Limerick, Ireland. Additionally, secular humanists in Northern Ireland have been conducting partnership ceremonies for same-sex couples in Northern Ireland for many years. Northern Ireland Humanists, the Northern Irish section of Humanists UK, welcomed the introduction of same-sex marriage and said it was looking forward to conducting official ceremonies.

The doctrine of the Catholic Church states: "The matrimonial covenant, by which a man and a woman establish between themselves a partnership of the whole of life, is by its nature ordered toward the good of the spouses and the procreation and education of offspring." In December 2023, the Holy See published Fiducia supplicans, a declaration allowing Catholic priests to bless couples who are not considered to be married according to church teaching, including the blessing of same-sex couples.

The Presbyterian Church in Ireland subscribes to the Westminster Confession of Faith which affirms that marriage "is to be between one man and one woman: neither is it lawful for any man to have more than one wife, nor for any woman to have more than one husband, at the same time". The Reformed Presbyterian Church of Ireland, the Evangelical Presbyterian Church and the Free Presbyterian Church of Ulster also subscribe to the Westminster Confession of Faith and its definition of marriage. The Congregational Union of Ireland affirms the Savoy Declaration, which is similar to the Westminster Confession of Faith in stating that "marriage is to be between one man and one woman: neither is it lawful for any man to have more than one wife, nor for any woman to have more than one husband at the same time". The Salvation Army – as stated in its "Marriage Positional Statement" – believes that marriage is "an exclusive and lifelong relationship between one man and one woman which is characterised by mutual submission, respect, self-giving love, faithfulness and openness to each other". It adds that human imperfection and sinfulness "may make it difficult to reach the goal of lifelong faithfulness" and that the Christian ideal of marriage is compromised by breakdown, separation and divorce, cohabitation, forced marriage, same-sex partnerships and polygamy. However, the Salvation Army "does not condemn or abandon people who fall short of the ideal" but rather, in God's name, it seeks to offer support, reconciliation, counsel, grace and forgiveness.

The Church of Ireland affirms in its canon law that "according to our Lord's teaching that marriage is in its purpose a union permanent and life-long, for better or worse, till death do them part, of one man with one woman, to the exclusion of all others on either side". In 2012, the General Synod of the Church of Ireland reaffirmed this teaching in a motion on "Human Sexuality in the Context of Christian Belief". The motion added that the church "recognises for itself and of itself, no other understanding of marriage" and acknowledged that members of the church "have at times hurt and wounded people by words and actions, in relation to human sexuality". The church affirmed a "continuing commitment to love our neighbour, and opposition to all unbiblical and uncharitable actions and attitudes in respect of human sexuality from whatever perspective, including bigotry, hurtful words or actions, and demeaning or damaging language". Some dioceses have expressed support for same-sex blessings.

The Methodist Church in Ireland states that marriage is "a relationship, intended as permanent, between one man and one woman" in its "Practical Expressions of Methodist Belief" document. The church opposes "all debased forms of sexuality and sexual practice, whether heterosexual or homosexual" but asks for "understanding and tolerance for those whose sexual orientation is towards those of their own gender" and encourages the wider church "to give a greater lead in the education of society, including Christians, regarding this issue, so that ignorance, prejudice and fear may disappear". The Association of Baptist Churches in Ireland affirms "the creation ordinance of marriage as the lifelong union of one man and one woman" in its Doctrinal Statement.

== Public opinion ==
A September 2014 LucidTalk poll for the Belfast Telegraph showed that 40.1% of the population supported same-sex marriage, while 39.4% opposed and 20.5% either had or stated no opinion. Of those that gave an opinion, 50.5% supported and 49.5% opposed same-sex marriage. A poll in May 2015 found that 68% of the population supported same-sex marriage, with support rising to 75% in Belfast. A "mass rally", organised by the Irish Congress of Trade Unions, Amnesty International, and the Rainbow Project took place in Belfast on 13 June 2015, with a 20,000 person turnout. A June 2016 poll placed support for same-sex marriage at 70%, while those opposing it at 22%.

A December 2016 LucidTalk poll found that 65% of people surveyed supported the legalisation of same-sex marriage in Northern Ireland. However, a majority of unionist respondents was opposed to same-sex marriage, with only 37% in favour (with support rising to 71% for unionists aged between 18 and 24 years of age). By contrast, 93% of nationalist respondents and 96% of Alliance/Green/PBP voters were in favour. An April 2018 Sky Data poll placed support for same-sex marriage in Northern Ireland at 76%, with 18% opposed.

A 2019 poll conducted by YouGov revealed that 70% of British people agreed that same-sex marriage should be legalised in Northern Ireland (up from 65% in 2018), including 55% of those living in Northern Ireland. Among Conservative voters, 62% (up from 54% in 2018) expressed support for the introduction of same-sex marriage in Northern Ireland. 81% of "Remain" voters said they supported same-sex marriage, compared to 60% of "Leave" voters. This was at a time when in the aftermath of the 2016 EU referendum the issue of Brexit dominated British politics. In Northern Ireland itself, 72% of women supported same-sex marriage, compared to 40% of men.

== See also ==
- LGBTQ rights in Northern Ireland
- Same-sex marriage in the United Kingdom
- Same-sex marriage in the Republic of Ireland
- Recognition of same-sex unions in Europe
- Recognition of same-sex unions in the British Overseas Territories
- Same-sex union court cases
