= SUFS =

SUFS may refer to:

- Cysteine desulfurase, an enzyme
- Save Ulster from Sodomy
