= Tina McKenzie =

Tina McKenzie may refer to:

- Tina McKenzie (basketball) (born 1974), Australian wheelchair basketball player
- Tina McKenzie (politician) (born 1973), Northern Irish business executive and politician
