= Basil McCrea =

British politician (born 1959)

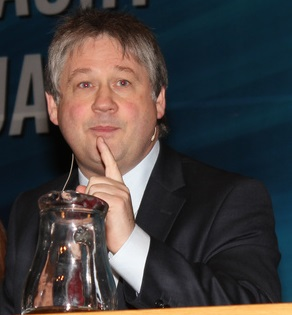

Leader of NI21
- In office 6 June 2013 – 3 November 2016
- Deputy: John McCallister; Johnny McCarthy; Vacant
- Preceded by: Position established
- Succeeded by: Position abolished

Member of the Northern Ireland Assembly for Lagan Valley
- In office 7 March 2007 – 5 May 2016
- Preceded by: Billy Bell
- Succeeded by: Robbie Butler

Member of Lisburn City Council
- In office 5 May 2005 – 5 May 2011
- Preceded by: William Falloon
- Succeeded by: Paul Stewart
- Constituency: Downshire

Personal details
- Born: 13 November 1959 (age 66) Omagh, Northern Ireland
- Party: NI21 (2013–2016); Independent (2013); Ulster Unionist (before 2013)
- Education: University of Birmingham; University of Ulster
- Profession: Chemical engineer

Basil McCrea (born 13 November 1959) is a former Northern Irish politician. He was the party leader of NI21 from 2013 until it disbanded in 2016. He was also a Member of the Northern Ireland Assembly (MLA) for Lagan Valley from 2007 to 2016.

== Political career ==
McCrea unsuccessfully contested the 2005 general election in Lagan Valley for the Ulster Unionist Party (UUP). He was elected in 2007 to the Northern Ireland Assembly as a UUP member for Lagan Valley. He has been a UUP Councillor on Lisburn City Council and was, until his election to the Assembly, a Party officer and spokesman for the Northern Ireland Manufacturers' Focus Group. He has served as a member of the Northern Ireland Policing Board and UUP spokesman on Education. He was formerly a member of the Assembly Committee for the Department for Employment and Learning.

He stood for leader of the Ulster Unionist Party (UUP) against Tom Elliott in the contest after the UK 2010 General Election. He was widely seen as the candidate of the UUP's "liberal" wing, while Elliott was seen as the candidate of the "conservative" wing. He lost the election by 643 votes to 296. In 2012 McCrea attended a Sinn Féin event on 'uniting Ireland' and said unionism should not be afraid to put its case.

In October 2012, he was one of three unionist assembly members to vote in favour of same-sex marriage being introduced in Northern Ireland.

In February 2013, having been subjected to a UUP disciplinary process for publicly opposing a proposal for a "unionist unity" candidate in an impending Parliamentary by-election, McCrea announced that he was resigning from the UUP, stating that he disagreed with the tactic of joint working with the rival Democratic Unionist Party.

=== NI21 ===
On 6 June 2013 at the Metropolitan Arts Centre in Belfast along with fellow ex-UUP member John McCallister, McCrea launched NI21, with himself as leader and McCallister as deputy. The party aimed to be a more progressive, pro-European, moderate and "modern" unionist party The party aimed to form an official opposition in the assembly to the all-party consensus government.

The party initially chose to be Designated Unionist members in the Northern Ireland Assembly. However, in May 2014, two days before European and local elections, they announced a decision to re-designate as Designated Other. Deputy leader John McCallister criticised the announcement, which he labelled "crazy" and claiming he and other members had not been properly consulted and suggested the decision was evidence of how "dysfunctional" the party had become. McCrea responded by requesting an explanation for the public criticisms and referred McCallister to the party executive.

The following deputy leader and sole councillor of the party, Johnny McCarthy resigned in 2015

=== Allegations of sexual misconduct ===
In May 2014, up to nine women accused McCrea of sexual harassment. Deputy leader John McCallister called on McCrea to step down until the investigation was completed. McCallister subsequently accused McCrea of interfering with the investigation and resigned from the deputy leadership and the party. In March 2016 the Assembly Standards Commissioner dismissed all complaints of misconduct brought against Basil McCrea.

== Private life ==
McCrea was born into an Ulster Scots family in Omagh but grew up in Ramelton a small town in the north-east of County Donegal in the north of the Republic of Ireland, where he grew up in his very early years. His father carried an Irish passport, although McCrea himself carries a British one. He was educated at Belfast Royal Academy (B.R.A.) before attaining a Chemical Engineering degree from the University of Birmingham. He later attained a degree in Advanced Computer Technology from the University of Ulster.

Northern Ireland Assembly
Preceded by Billy Bell	MLA for Lagan Valley; 2007–2016	Succeeded by Robbie Butler
New political party	Leader of NI21; 2013–2016	Party de-registered
