= John McCallister =

British politician (born 1972)

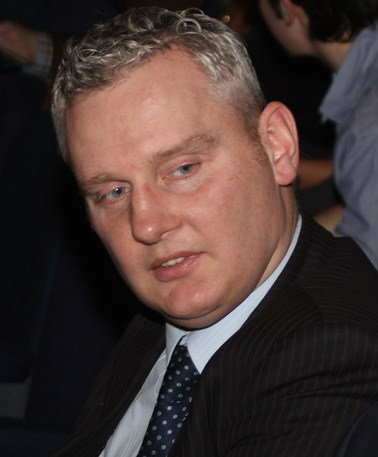

Deputy Leader of NI21
- In office 6 June 2013 – 3 July 2014
- Leader: Basil McCrea
- Preceded by: Office created
- Succeeded by: Johnny McCarthy

Deputy Leader of the Ulster Unionist Party
- In office 27 October 2010 – 1 October 2012
- Leader: Tom Elliot; Mike Nesbitt
- Preceded by: Danny Kennedy
- Succeeded by: Robin Swann

Member of the Legislative Assembly for South Down
- In office 7 March 2007 – 7 May 2016
- Preceded by: Dermot Nesbitt
- Succeeded by: Harold McKee

Personal details
- Born: 20 February 1972 (age 54) Newry, Northern Ireland
- Party: Independent (2013; 2014 - present); NI21 (2013 - 2014); Ulster Unionist Party (before 2013)
- Spouse: Jane McCallister
- Children: 2
- Profession: Farmer

John McCallister (born 20 February 1972) is a former Northern Irish Unionist politician who was a Member of the Legislative Assembly (MLA) for South Down from 2007 to 2016.

He was initially an Ulster Unionist Party (UUP) representative, later serving as deputy leader, as well as an unsuccessful candidate in the 2012 leadership election.

On 14 February 2013, McCallister announced that he had resigned from the UUP due to its decision to engage in an electoral pact with the Democratic Unionist Party. He was a co-founder of the NI21 party with fellow ex-UUP member Basil McCrea but resigned the following year following disputes with McCrea.

He was defeated at the subsequent Assembly election.

== Political career ==
A native of Rathfriland, John McCallister has had a strong interest in agriculture and environmental issues in the community and voluntary sector and has been assigned to serve on the Committee for Health, Social Services and Public Safety and the Committee for Regional Development. He has been a member of the Young Farmers' Clubs of Ulster (YFCU) since 1984 and, in 2003–05, served as YFCU president.

McCallister introduced the Bill which became the Caravans Act (Northern Ireland), 2011 to give legal protection to holiday-makers who stay in caravans and to people who live permanently in park homes. The Bill passed the Assembly in February 2011, and received Royal Assent on 16 March; the Speaker of the Northern Ireland Assembly congratulated him on being the first person to guide a Private Member's Bill onto the statute book in Northern Ireland since 1931.

=== UUP deputy leader ===
Following the election of Tom Elliott as UUP leader, McCallister was appointed the Party's deputy leader. The following year the UUP Whip Fred Cobain lost his seat in the Assembly and McCallister was chosen to replace him.

After attending a Sinn Féin conference in November 2011 in Newry he issued an apology for "unionist failings" in the past. Families Acting for Innocent Relatives (FAIR) leader and prominent unionist activist Willie Frazer stated that people in the unionist community were "appalled" by McCallister's remarks.

In March 2012 he performed an emergency delivery of a baby on his wife when they were unable to reach the hospital on time.

He has stated the importance of his party reaching out to Catholic voters. In contrast with some previous Unionist leaders he would happily support his local GAA team and would have no opposition to Gay Pride marches.

After being called the "leader of the opposition" by culture minister Carál Ní Chuilín, McCallister said, "If I win the leadership I think that title could quickly catch on. It has a ring to it."

=== UUP leadership election of March 2012 ===
McCallister fought the UUP leadership in March 2012 losing to Mike Nesbitt by 129 votes to 536.

McCallister was sacked by Mike Nesbitt as UUP deputy leader on 1 October 2012 for making a speech criticising unionist unity, which was seen by Nesbitt as an attack on his leadership.

=== Resignation from the UUP and NI21 ===
On 14 February 2013, McCallister announced that he had resigned from the UUP in reaction to the decision to field a unionist unity candidate in the Mid-Ulster by-election. He declared that he would sit as an Independent Unionist in the Assembly. In an interview the following day Basil McCrea, who had also resigned from the UUP, suggested that he and McCallister were preparing to launch a new moderate unionist party.

The new party, NI21 was launched in June 2013. McCallister became deputy leader with McCrea as leader. Two days before the 2014 European and local elections in which the party performed poorly, NI21 announced it would be changing from Designated Unionist to Designated Other in the Northern Ireland Assembly. McCallister criticised the move, which he labelled "crazy" and evidence of how "dysfunctional" NI21 had become. McCallister alleged the decision had been made without proper consultation McCrea then demanded an explanation from McCallister for his comments and stated the executive would discuss the comments.

In July 2014 amid allegations of inappropriate behaviour by McCrea, McCallister resigned to resume sitting in the Northern Ireland Assembly as an independent. He re-contested his seat as an Independent at the 2016 election but lost his seat, receiving just 2.8% of the vote.

=== Fraud allegations ===
In June 2015 the Police Service of Northern Ireland raided McCallister's home over allegations relating to the misuse of public funds A number of items including a computer were seized and police referred the case to the Public Prosecution Service.

Northern Ireland Assembly
Preceded by Dermot Nesbitt	MLA for South Down; 2007–2016	Succeeded by Harold McKee
Preceded by Danny Kennedy	Deputy Leader of the Ulster Unionist Party; 2010–2012	Vacant
Preceded by Fred Cobain	Chief Whip of the Ulster Unionist Party; 2011–2012	Succeeded by Robin Swann
New political party	Deputy Leader of NI21; 2013–2014	Succeeded by Johnny McCarthy
