= Tina McKenzie (politician) =

Businesswoman from Northern Ireland

Tina McKenzie MBE
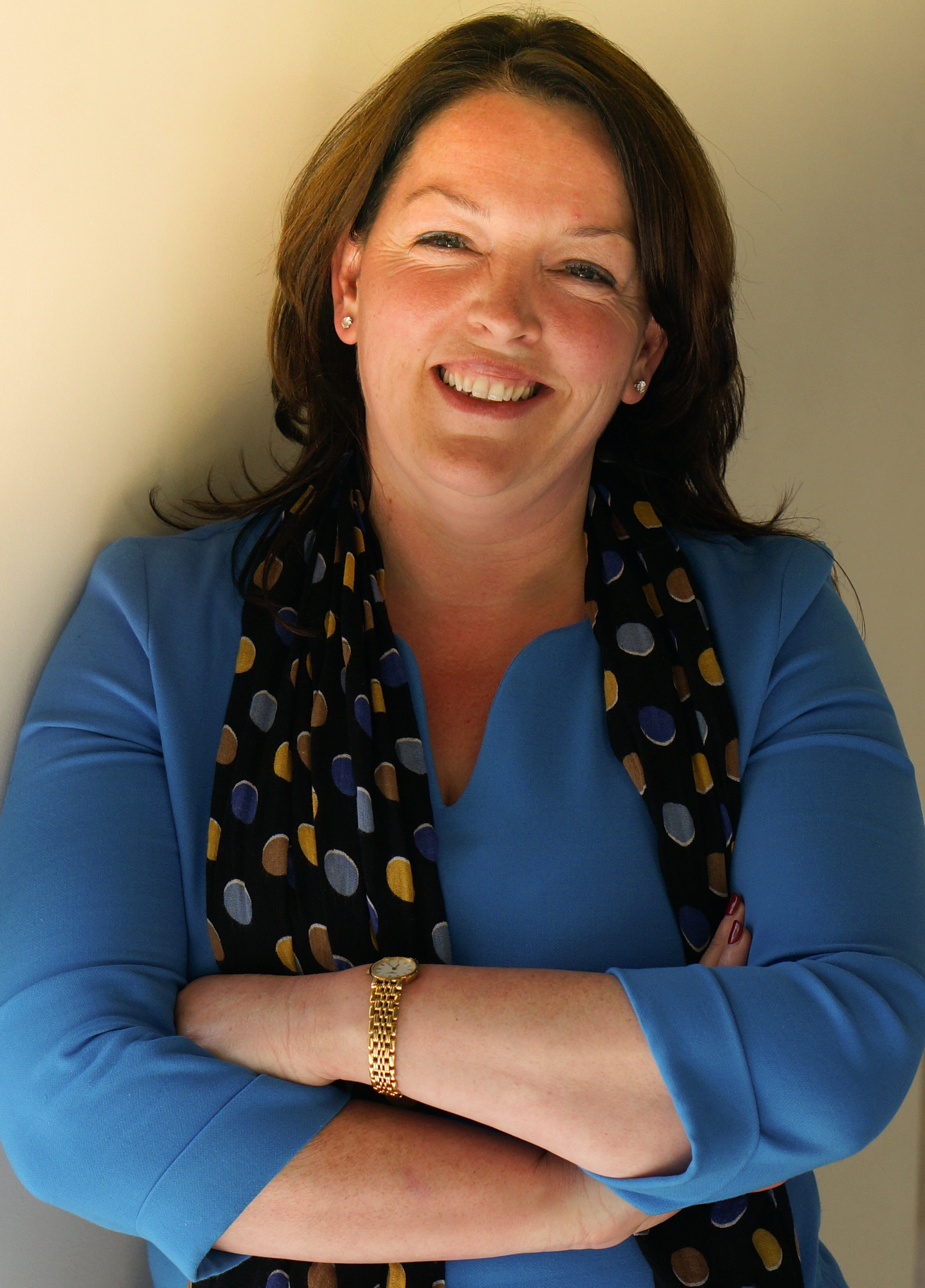
- Born: 1973 (age 52–53); Belfast, Northern Ireland
- Education: University of Ulster
- Occupation: Businesswoman
- Children: 3
- Website: stafflinerecruit.com

Tina McKenzie MBE (born 1973) is a business executive and former politician from Belfast in Northern Ireland.

== Early life ==
After graduating from the University of Ulster, McKenzie started her career co-ordinating job-skills programmes for the rehabilitation of ex-offenders, working with NIACRO, Extern, and the Probation Board for Northern Ireland (PBNI).

McKenzie undertook further studies at the Tilburg University Business School and IESE Business School at the University of Navarra. McKenzie also undertook further study at the William J. Clinton Leadership Institute at Queen's University Belfast, completing the 'Leading Effective Boards' Programme in 2015.

== Political life ==
McKenzie returned to her native Northern Ireland in 2013 to set up Staffline Group (Ireland). Shortly after her return she joined newly formed political party NI21 and was appointed its first chair. McKenzie described herself as believing in the maintenance of the union of Britain and Northern Ireland, principally for economic reasons.

NI21 selected McKenzie as their candidate for the European election of 2014, proposing to support the region in Europe and promote jobs and economic growth. She also stood for Belfast City Council in the Balmoral electoral area gaining just 256 first preference votes, a little under 3% of the overall first preference votes cast. She received more than 10,500 first-preference votes in the European election, gaining 1.7% of the vote, well below the threshold for election.

On the night of the election, some figures within the party resigned, including McKenzie, following allegations of misconduct made against party leader Basil McCrea. Shortly after, McKenzie announced she was leaving politics on the grounds that she was disillusioned.

== Business life ==
In 2017 McKenzie was appointed the Honorary Consul to Finland in Belfast. Her consular roles include promoting economic, political, academic and cultural relations between the Nordic region and Northern Ireland, and monitoring the rights of Finnish citizens in the area. In this role, McKenzie introduced Irish President Michael D. Higgins when he delivered the Harri Holkeri Lecture at Queen's University Belfast in 2018. The same year, McKenzie was appointed the chair of the NI Policy Forum for the Federation of Small Businesses in Northern Ireland. McKenzie's appointment to the role ensured that Northern Ireland's four key business lobby groups—the Institute of Directors, the Northern Ireland Chamber of Commerce, the Confederation of British Industry and the FSB—were all headed by women. McKenzie previously held the position of Regional Director (Northern Ireland) for the Recruitment and Employment Confederation (REC), the governing body of the recruitment industry.

In January 2018, McKenzie gave evidence to the House of Lords European Union Select Committee on the impact of Brexit on businesses in Northern Ireland. More recently, as chair of the FSB, McKenzie led the debate on Northern Ireland becoming the 'Singapore of the Western Hemisphere' by introducing tariff free trade between the EU and the UK. In September 2018, McKenzie and the FSB published a proposal to make Northern Ireland an 'Enhanced Economic Zone' after Brexit

McKenzie was announced as a visiting professor in Ulster University's Business School, based in Belfast, beginning in 2021. In 2022, was appointed as UK Chair of Policy and Advocacy for the Federation of Small Businesses, the UK’s biggest business organisation representing the interests of self-employed people and smaller businesses. The role means she will also serve in one of the most senior positions on the organisation’s Board of Directors. In the summer of 2023, McKenzie was named as the 20th most influential behind-the-scenes figure in UK politics by Politico, which called her "one of the highly-effective Northern Ireland business lobbyists" who gained influence after Brexit. She was also awarded an MBE in the King’s inaugural Birthday Honours for Services to the Economy in Northern Ireland.

In the final months of the Sunak-led Government - February 2024 - McKenzie was appointed to the Department of Business and Trade Small Business Council. She was appointed as Co-Chair of the Department of Business and Trade Small Business task force in June 2026. In January 2026, Tina McKenzie MBE was awarded the Freedom of the City of London by the City of London Corporation for Outstanding Contribution to the UK Economy. In July 2026, Ulster University conferred an Honorary Doctor of Science (DSc) on alumna Tina McKenzie MBE at its Belfast campus, recognising her outstanding contribution to business.

== Personal life ==
McKenzie is married and the mother of three children.

Party political offices
Preceded by New position	Chair of NI21; 2013–2014	Succeeded by Olive Buckley
