= Andy Allen (politician) =

Northern Ireland politician (born 1988)

Andy Allen MBE MLA
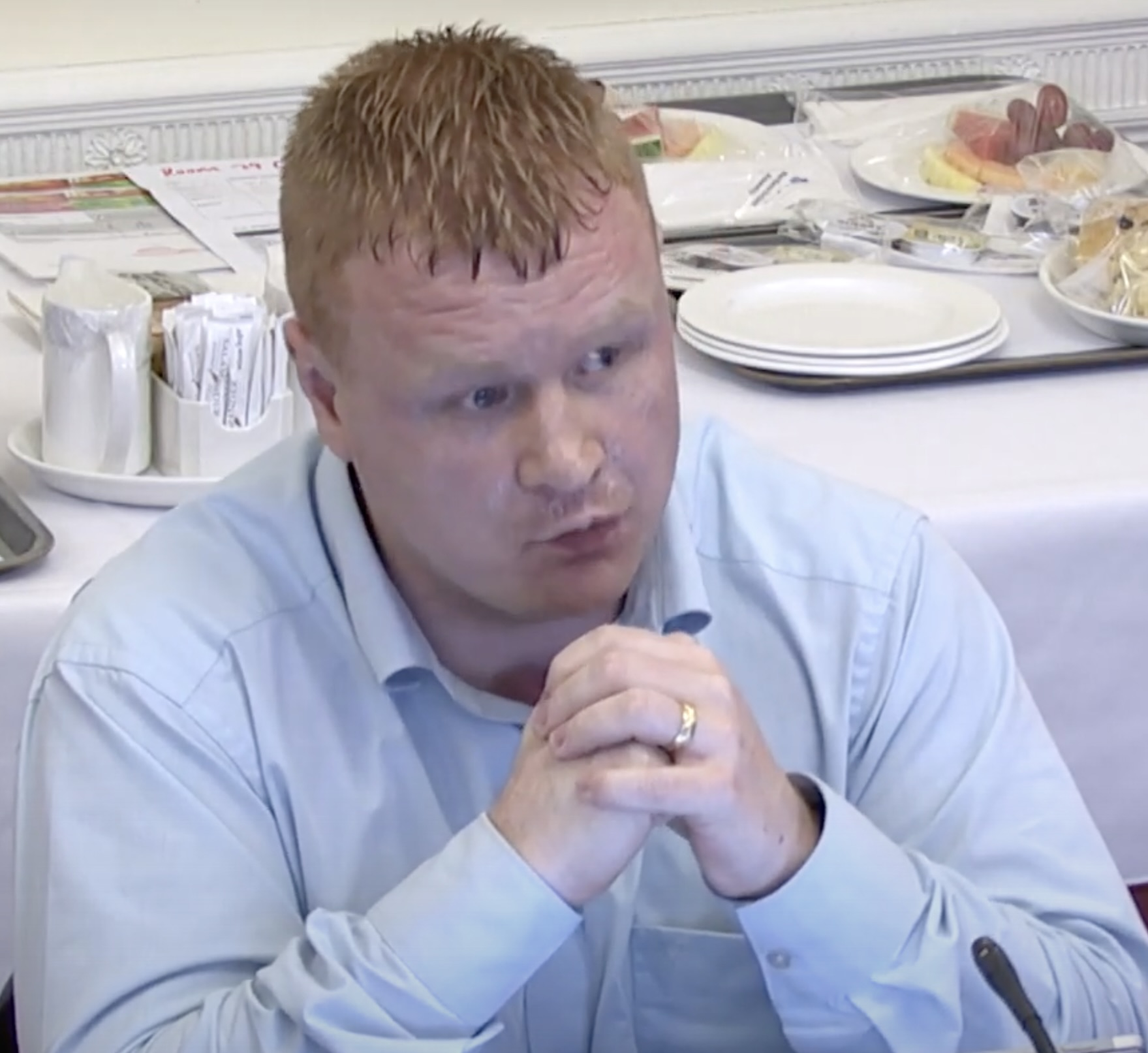
- Allen in 2021

Ulster Unionist Party spokesperson for Communities
- Incumbent
- Assumed office 24 May 2021
- Leader: Doug Beattie

Member of the Northern Ireland Assembly for Belfast East
- Incumbent
- Assumed office 15 September 2015
- Preceded by: Michael Copeland

Personal details
- Born: 2 November 1988 (age 37) Belfast, Northern Ireland
- Party: Ulster Unionist Party
- Spouse: Natalie Keenan (m. 2009)
- Children: 3
- Occupation: Politician
- Profession: Soldier
- Website: Official website

Military service
- Allegiance: United Kingdom
- Branch/service: British Army
- Years of service: 2006–2012
- Rank: Ranger
- Unit: Royal Irish Regiment
- Battles/wars: War in Afghanistan

Andrew Allen MBE MLA (born 2 November 1988) is an Ulster Unionist Party (UUP) politician in Northern Ireland and a former soldier in the British Army. He served in the War in Afghanistan in 2008. He is one of the more liberal members of the party, consistently voting in favour of same-sex marriage and abortion.

Allen is the UUP spokesperson for Communities, and has been a Member of the Northern Ireland Assembly (MLA) for Belfast East since 2015. Allen resigned as Ulster Unionist Chief Whip in July 2025, after being appointed to the role in October 2024.

== Biography ==
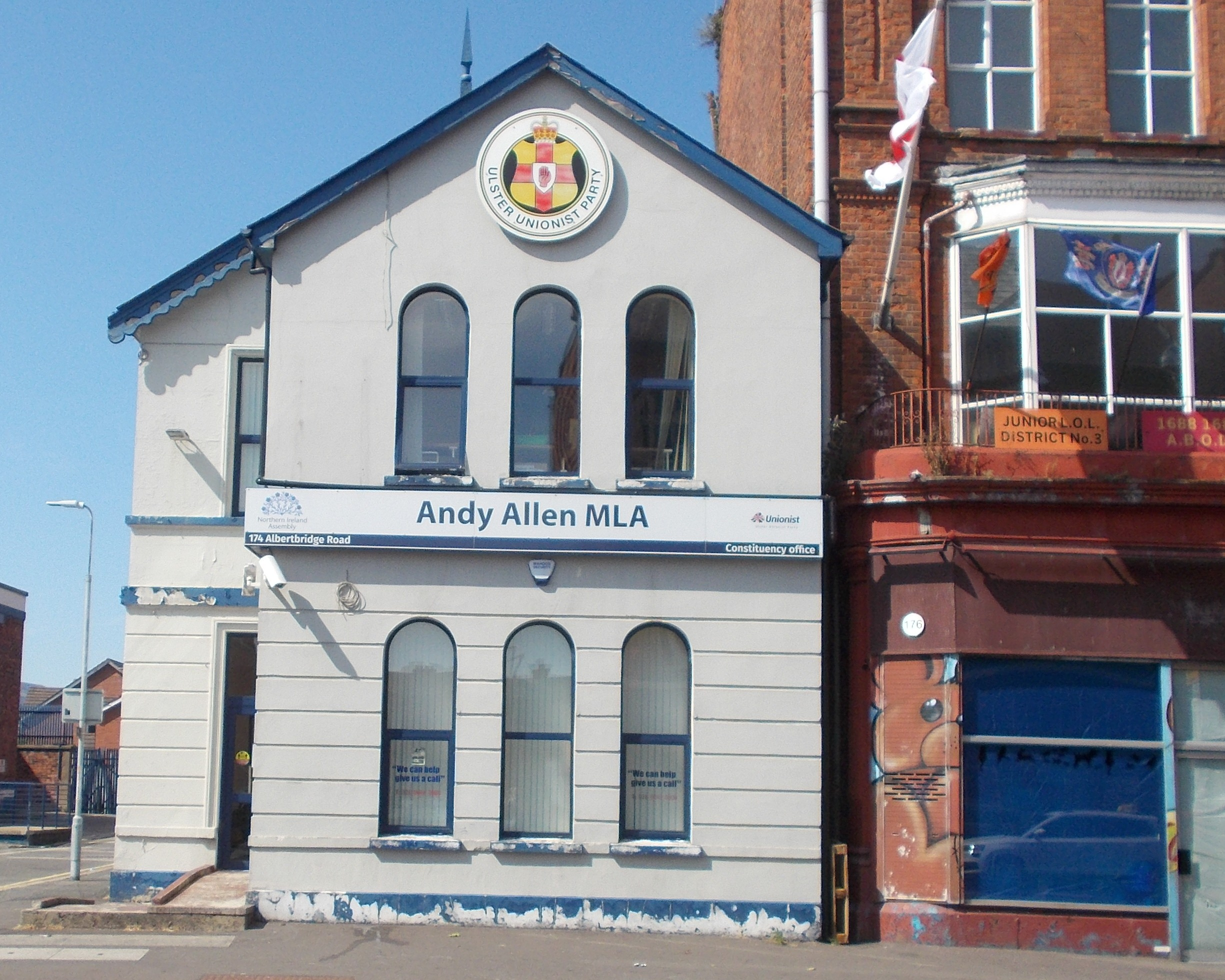
Andy Allen MLA - Albertbridge Road constituency office

Since September 2015, Allen has sat in the Northern Ireland Assembly as a Member of the Legislative Assembly (MLA) for Belfast East. He was co-opted to replace Michael Copeland, who had resigned his seat for health reasons. He has been re-elected three times, first in May 2016, then in March 2017, and most recently in May 2022.

He is a veteran of the War in Afghanistan, and was left a double above knee amputee and partially blind as a result of an attack by the Taliban in Helmand using an improvised explosive device.

He featured in the BAFTA winning documentary, "Wounded." The documentary followed his journey from being injured in Afghanistan, which was caught on camera by one of his colleagues to his admission to Selly Oak Hospital in Birmingham, and his overall recovery. He is the founder of AA Veterans Support a charity setup to provide support to service personnel, veterans and their families in Northern Ireland.

He was awarded an MBE in the 2019 New Years Honour list for Service to Veterans and their families in Northern Ireland.

In November 2023, as the UUP's Communities Spokesperson, Allen met with trade union representatives and called for non-teaching school staff to receive fair pay and employment terms.

Allen married Natalie Keenan in October 2009 and they have three children. He lives in the Shankill area of Belfast.

Northern Ireland Assembly
Preceded by Michael Copeland	MLA for Belfast East; 2015–present	Incumbent
