= Save Ulster from Sodomy =

Political campaign in Northern Ireland

Save Ulster from Sodomy was a political campaign launched in 1977 by Ian Paisley, MP, then leader of the Democratic Unionist Party (DUP) and Free Presbyterian Church, to prevent the decriminalisation of homosexuality in Northern Ireland. The campaign was ultimately unsuccessful.

== Background ==
Homosexual acts began to be decriminalised in the United Kingdom in 1967 in England and Wales, under the Sexual Offences Act 1967. This change in law did not apply to the separate legal jurisdictions of Northern Ireland and Scotland. In 1975 the Northern Ireland Gay Rights Association was established to campaign for equivalent legislation for Northern Ireland. In response to the government's proposal to consider law reform, Paisley launched Save Ulster from Sodomy, a campaign given a further boost when decriminalisation was extended to Scotland in 1980. The campaign was based on his belief that the Bible condemns homosexuality as a sin, which should therefore not be legally acceptable in a state founded on Christian principles.

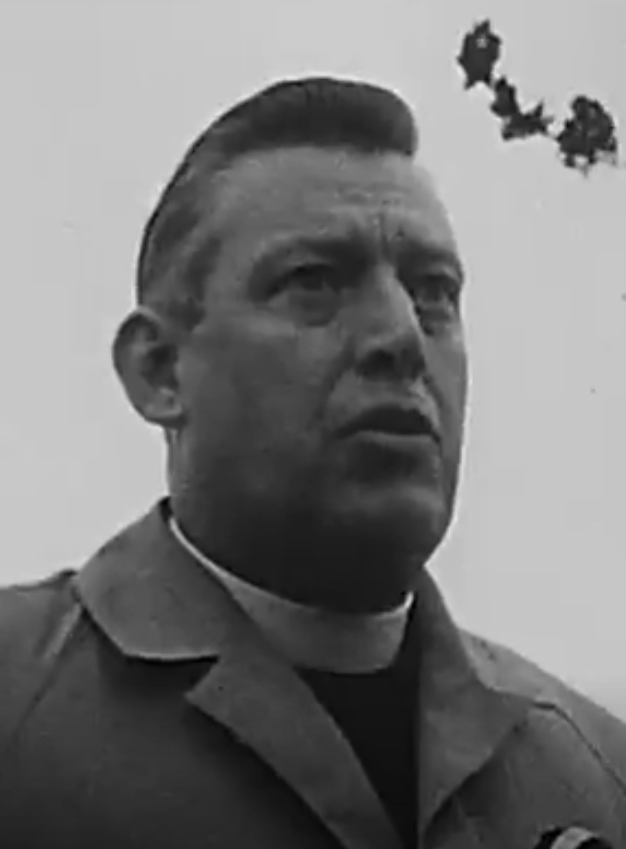
Ian Paisley, the DUP leader who started the "Save Ulster From Sodomy" campaign.

LGBT rights in Northern Ireland were restricted in accordance to the deeply conservative nature of society at that time. Anti-Catholicism inflected misogynist attitudes and vice versa, with Paisley calling the Catholic Church the "mother of harlots and abominations of the Earth"—Catholic iconography included comparatively more female figures than that of the Protestant church, like Kathleen Ni Houlihan and the Virgin Mary. At the time of the campaign, violent attacks against gay men in Northern Ireland were common.

== Organization ==
The campaign itself was particularly linked to the Free Presbyterian wing of the DUP, and combined religious and political rhetoric. It focused on Paisley's belief in his role to save the "Ulster people" from those influences which he believed undermined their Christian beliefs and values, namely liberalism and secularism.

As part of the campaign, advertisements were placed in newspapers claiming that any change in the law "can only bring God's curse down upon our people". The group recruited 70,000 members to join the campaign mostly through outreach to church attendees.

== End ==
In 1981 the European Court of Human Rights, in the case of Jeffrey Dudgeon v the United Kingdom, found that the British Government was in breach of Article 8 (the right to a private life) of the European Convention of Human Rights by refusing to decriminalise homosexual acts between consenting adults in Northern Ireland. Consequently, despite Paisley's campaign, homosexual acts in Northern Ireland were decriminalised in 1982.

== Legacy ==
The DUP remains opposed to homosexuality and LGBT rights, and in September 2004 the British government agreed to postpone a vote in the House of Commons on a Bill to provide for same-sex civil partnerships, to avoid a clash with talks aimed at restoring devolved rule in Northern Ireland. All six DUP Members of Parliament planned to vote against the Bill. Eventually, however, it was enacted as the Civil Partnership Act 2004 and Northern Ireland was the first part of the British Isles to register a partnership.

== See also ==
- LGBT rights in Northern Ireland
