= Cara-Friend =

Northern Irish LGBTQ+ organization

- Formation: 1974
- Headquarters: Belfast
- Location: All Northern Ireland
- Website: Cara-Friend

Cara-Friend was set up in 1974 "as a voluntary counseling, befriending, information, health and social space organisation for the Lesbian, Gay, Bisexual & Trans (LGB&T) community" in Northern Ireland.

Cara-Friend was founded in October 1974 in Belfast, after a telephone support service for homosexuals called Cara was overwhelmed with calls in April 1974. Seeing demand for support Cara-Friend was founded, and recruited 28 people to be befrienders. In their first year of operation they received 243 requests for support.

Their phone service launched in January 1976, initially only being staffed for six hours a week. This expanded over the years, with additional phone lines opening over the years. In 1977, a phone line was opened in Coleraine, closing in 1980 due to a lack of volunteers. Another phone line was opened in Derry in 1980. A lesbian specific line was opened in 1980, and ran on Thursdays.

In 1976 a separate transgender support group was formed to help support individuals who were contacting the Cara-Friend support line. In the same year Cara-Friend also recruited transgender individuals to help staff the support line, and dedicated Thursdays to transgender callers. The service was closed in 1978 after the death of Wilma Creith, who died as a result of a blood clot while undergoing gender-affirming surgery. Creith had helped set up the helpline and the transgender support group.

Cara-Friend has a youth group for anyone between the ages of 12 to 17 on a Monday and Thurday, and 18 to 35 on a Friday who identifies as LGBTQIA+ and offers support and help to them. Cara-Friend is well known as one of the most prominent groups for LGBTQIA+ young people in Northern Ireland and has released "What's In Your Closet?" - a guide for parents, teachers and students to coming out.

Cara-Friend offers support to regional youth groups across Northern Ireland, training for staff and businesses, and education within schools.

Cara-Friend is also the longest running LGBTQIA+ charity in Northern Ireland.
