= Cross-community vote =

Form of voting used in Northern Ireland

A cross-community vote or cross-community support is a form of voting used in the Northern Ireland Assembly according to the provisions of the 1998 Good Friday Agreement. It requires the support of both main communities in Northern Ireland, in other words majority of unionists and the majority of nationalist members of the Assembly. Among other reasons, it arises when the petition of concern procedure is invoked.

== Background ==
Upon taking their seats members of the Northern Ireland Assembly are required to designate themselves as either "unionist", "nationalist" or "other". Members may change their designation of identity only if they become a member of a (different) political party or they cease to be a member of any political party.

The election of the Speaker, appointment of the Minister of Justice, any changes to the standing orders and the adoption of certain money bills must all occur with cross-community support.

This was originally set out in the Northern Ireland Act 1998.

=== Petition of concern ===
The Petition of Concern is a mechanism whereby 30 MLAs can petition the Assembly requiring a matter to be passed on a cross-community rather than a simple majority basis. Under the Belfast (Good Friday) Agreement, it is one of the 'safeguards' in Strand One as a mechanism "to ensure key decisions [in the Assembly] are taken on cross-community basis". The requirement to enable a Petition of Concern is given effect in the Northern Ireland Act 1998 and in the Assembly's standing orders.

— Fourth Report on the Use of the Petition of Concern Mechanism in the Northern Ireland Assembly

Votes in the assembly do not ordinarily require cross-community support. However, if a "petition of concern" is raised successfully about proposed legislation or executive action, the speaker must call a cross-community vote. For a petition to be raised successfully, at least 30 of the 90 members from at least two parties (counting all independent signers of a petition of concern who were elected as independents as members from different parties) must sign the petition.

In a cross-community vote, the majority of unionists' and the majority of nationalists' votes are each required to pass a motion put to the assembly. By October 2019, petitions of concern had been tabled 159 times since 1998; they have been used on same-sex marriage, abortion and censure of politicians.

Section 42 of the 1998 Act (as amended by the Northern Ireland (Ministers, Elections and Petitions of Concern) Act 2022) declares that

(6) Standing orders must—

- (a) make provision with respect to the procedure to be followed in presenting and confirming a petition under this section (which may include provision specifying a minimum period between the presentation of the petition and the time when the vote on the matter to which it relates would take place if not postponed by the petition);
- (b) provide that the matter to which a petition under this section relates may be referred, in accordance with paragraphs 11 and 13 of Strand One of the Belfast Agreement, to the committee established under section 13(3)(a);
- (c) specify further matters that may not be the subject of a petition under this section, for the purposes of fully implementing paragraph 2.2.4 of Annex B of Part 2 of The New Decade, New Approach Deal;
- (d) make provision for such steps to be taken during the consideration period as may be necessary for the purposes of fully implementing paragraph 2.2.7 of Annex B of Part 2 of The New Decade, New Approach Deal.

Arising from the St Andrews Agreement, an "Assembly and Executive Review Committee" was set up. Among its Terms of Reference, the committee was to consider "provisions for voting on an Ad Hoc Committee on Conformity with Equality Requirements prior to the vote on a Petition of Concern". It also "considered the possibilities of restricting Petition of Concern to certain key areas, changing the 30 MLA threshold, and alternatives to Petitions of Concern (e.g. a weighted majority vote). There was no consensus on any of the issues."

In January 2020, negotiations between Northern Ireland's political parties and with the UK Government led to the New Decade, New Approach agreement, in which the parties agreed to greater restraint in their use of the Petition mechanism and to raise the threshold for its use. This agreement was set in law through the Northern Ireland (Ministers, Elections and Petitions of Concern) Act 2022.

== Procedure ==
According to the standing orders of the assembly, "after the signing of the Roll a Member may enter in the Roll a designation of identity, being Nationalist, Unionist or Other. A Member who does not register a designation of identity shall be deemed to be designated Other for the purposes of these Standing Orders."

=== Designations ===
Designations	1998	2003	2007	2011	2016	2017	2022
Unionist	58	59	55	56	56	40	37
Nationalist	42	42	44	43	40	39	35
Other	8	7	9	9	12	11	18

Note: These figures include the assumed designation of the Speaker who, having a non-partisan role, does not officially declare a designation. Note also the effect of the Reduction of Numbers Act, which partly accounts for the significant changes in 2017.

== Parties ==
List of current and previous assembly parties by designation.

=== Unionist ===
DUP	1971–present
NI21 (Note: Designated as 'Unionist' until the 2016 Northern Ireland Assembly election; planned to be designated as 'Other' following it but stood no candidates.)	2013–2016
NI Unionist	1999–2008
PUP	1979–present
UKIP	1993–present (Note: UKIP have not contested an election in Northern Ireland since 2017.)
UK Unionist	1995–2008
UUP	1905–present
TUV	2007–present
United Unionist Coalition	c. 2000–2012

=== Nationalist ===
Sinn Féin	1905/1970–present
SDLP	1970–present
Aontú	2019–present

=== Other ===
Alliance	1970–present
Green (NI)	1983–present
NI Women's Coalition	1996–2006
People Before Profit	2005–present

== See also ==
- Consociationalism
- Demography and politics of Northern Ireland
