= 1993 Cookstown District Council election =

Local govt election in Northern Ireland

← 1989	19 May 1993	1997 →

All 16 seats to Cookstown District Council 9 seats needed for a majority
	First party	Second party	Third party
Party	SDLP	UUP	DUP
Seats won	5	5	3
Seat change	0	▲2	▼2
	Fourth party	Fifth party
Party	Sinn Féin	Ind. Unionist
Seats won	2	1
Seat change	0	0
- Party with the most votes by district.

Elections to Cookstown District Council were held on 19 May 1993 on the same day as the other Northern Irish local government elections. The election used three district electoral areas to elect a total of 16 councillors.

== Election results ==
Cookstown District Council Election Result 1993
Party	Seats	Gains	Losses	Net gain/loss	Seats %	Votes %	Votes	+/−
SDLP	5	0	0	0	31.3	30.0	5,084	▲4.2
UUP	5	2	0	▲2	25.0	26.5	4,477	▲3.3
DUP	3	0	2	▼2	18.8	17.5	2,954	▼6.5
Sinn Féin	2	0	0	0	12.5	20.7	3,496	▲0.4
Ind. Unionist	1	0	0	0	6.3	4.8	818	▲0.2
Democratic Left	0	0	0	0	0.0	0.3	51	New
Independent Labour	0	0	0	0	0.0	0.2	44	▲0.2

Note: "Votes" are the first preference votes.

== Districts summary ==
Results of the Cookstown District Council election, 1993 by district
Ward	%	Cllrs	%	Cllrs	%	Cllrs	%	Cllrs	%	Cllrs	Total Cllrs
Ward	SDLP		UUP		DUP		Sinn Féin		Others		Total Cllrs
Ballinderry	33.0	2	21.0	2	22.6	1	23.4	1	0.0	0	6
Cookstown Central	30.9	2	37.6	2	15.8	1	13.8	0	1.9	0	5
Drum Manor	25.6	1	22.4	1	12.6	1	23.9	1	15.5	1	5
Total	30.0	5	26.5	5	17.5	3	20.7	2	5.3	1	16

== District results ==
=== Ballinderry ===
1989: 2 x SDLP, 2 x DUP, 1 x DUP, 1 x Sinn Féin
1993: 2 x SDLP, 2 x UUP, 1 x DUP, 1 x Sinn Féin
1989-1993 Change: UUP gain from DUP

Ballinderry - 6 seats
Party	Candidate	FPv%	Count				
Party	Candidate	FPv%	1	2	3	4	5
SDLP	Patsy McGlone	20.05%	1,314				
Sinn Féin	Seamus Campbell	18.90%	1,239				
SDLP	Francis Rocks	12.94%	848	1,205.6			
DUP	Anne McCrea	14.28%	936	936.6	936.87	940.47	
UUP	Thomas Greer	10.47%	686	686.3	687.11	690.11	980.11
UUP	Victor McGahie*	10.51%	689	690.5	692.12	701.12	926.42
Sinn Féin	Noel Quinn	4.50%	295	310.3	602.98	702.58	702.58
DUP	Samuel McCartney*	8.35%	547	547.3	548.11	549.61	
Electorate: 8,151 Valid: 6,554 (80.41%) Spoilt: 211 Quota: 937 Turnout: 6,765 (83.00%)

=== Cookstown Central ===
1989: 2 x SDLP, 2 x DUP, 1 x UUP
1993: 2 x SDLP, 2 x UUP, 1 x DUP
1989-1993 Change: UUP gain from DUP

Cookstown Central - 5 seats
Party	Candidate	FPv%	Count						
Party	Candidate	FPv%	1	2	3	4	5	6	7
UUP	Trevor Wilson*	29.70%	1,514						
SDLP	Denis Haughey*	18.42%	939						
UUP	Ian Montgomery	7.94%	405	949.28					
DUP	William Larmour	12.44%	634	712.76	767	783.84	784.11	953.11	
SDLP	Margaret Laverty*	12.46%	635	635.44	637.36	672.68	748.19	758.59	779.59
Sinn Féin	Martin Conlon	13.81%	704	704	704.08	716.08	720.67	720.76	720.76
DUP	Rodney Mitchell	3.37%	172	201.48	231.16	239.84	240.02		
Democratic Left	Edwin Espie	1.00%	51	54.08	55.68				
Independent Labour	Harry Hutchinson	0.86%	44	44.44	45.56				
Electorate: 7,047 Valid: 5,098 (72.34%) Spoilt: 112 Quota: 850 Turnout: 5,210 (73.93%)

=== Drum Manor ===
1989: 1 x Sinn Féin, 1 x UUP, 1 x SDLP, 1 x DUP, 1 x Independent Unionist
1993: 1 x Sinn Féin, 1 x UUP, 1 x SDLP, 1 x DUP, 1 x Independent Unionist
1989-1993 Change: No change

Drum Manor - 5 seats
Party	Candidate	FPv%	Count				
Party	Candidate	FPv%	1	2	3	4	5
UUP	Samuel Glasgow*	22.44%	1,183				
Sinn Féin	Sean Begley*	20.35%	1,073				
Ind. Unionist	Samuel Parke*	15.52%	818	1,037.7			
DUP	William Cuddy	12.61%	665	739.62	739.62	884.97	
SDLP	James McGarvey*	15.91%	839	846.28	853.3	859	906.8
SDLP	Sean Mallon	9.65%	509	510.04	515.26	515.64	602.78
Sinn Féin	Finbar Conway	3.51%	185	185.52	360.12	360.12	
Electorate: 6,335 Valid: 5,272 (83.22%) Spoilt: 147 Quota: 879 Turnout: 5,419 (85.54%)
