= 1989 Northern Ireland local elections =

- 17 May 1989

All council seats
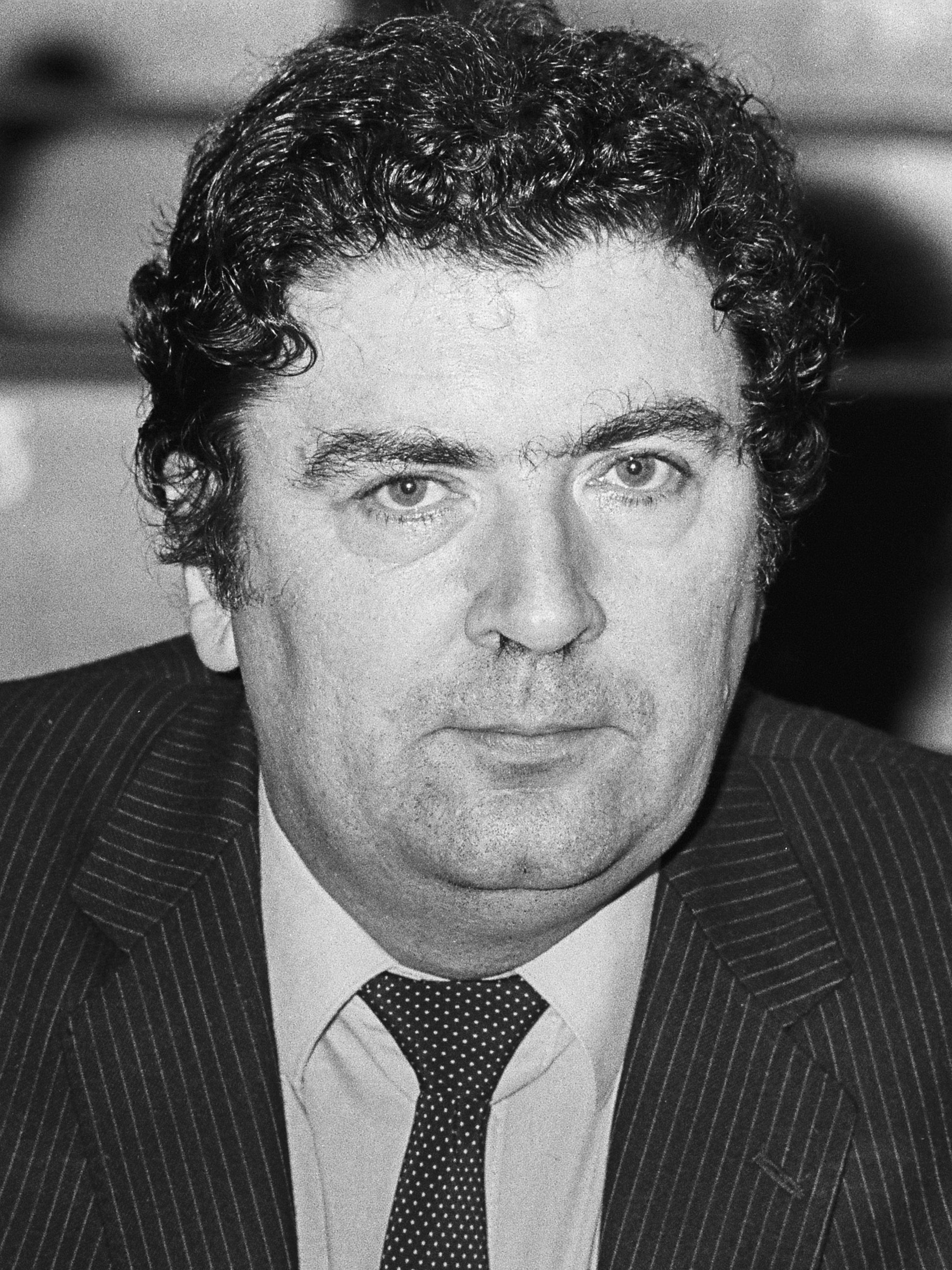

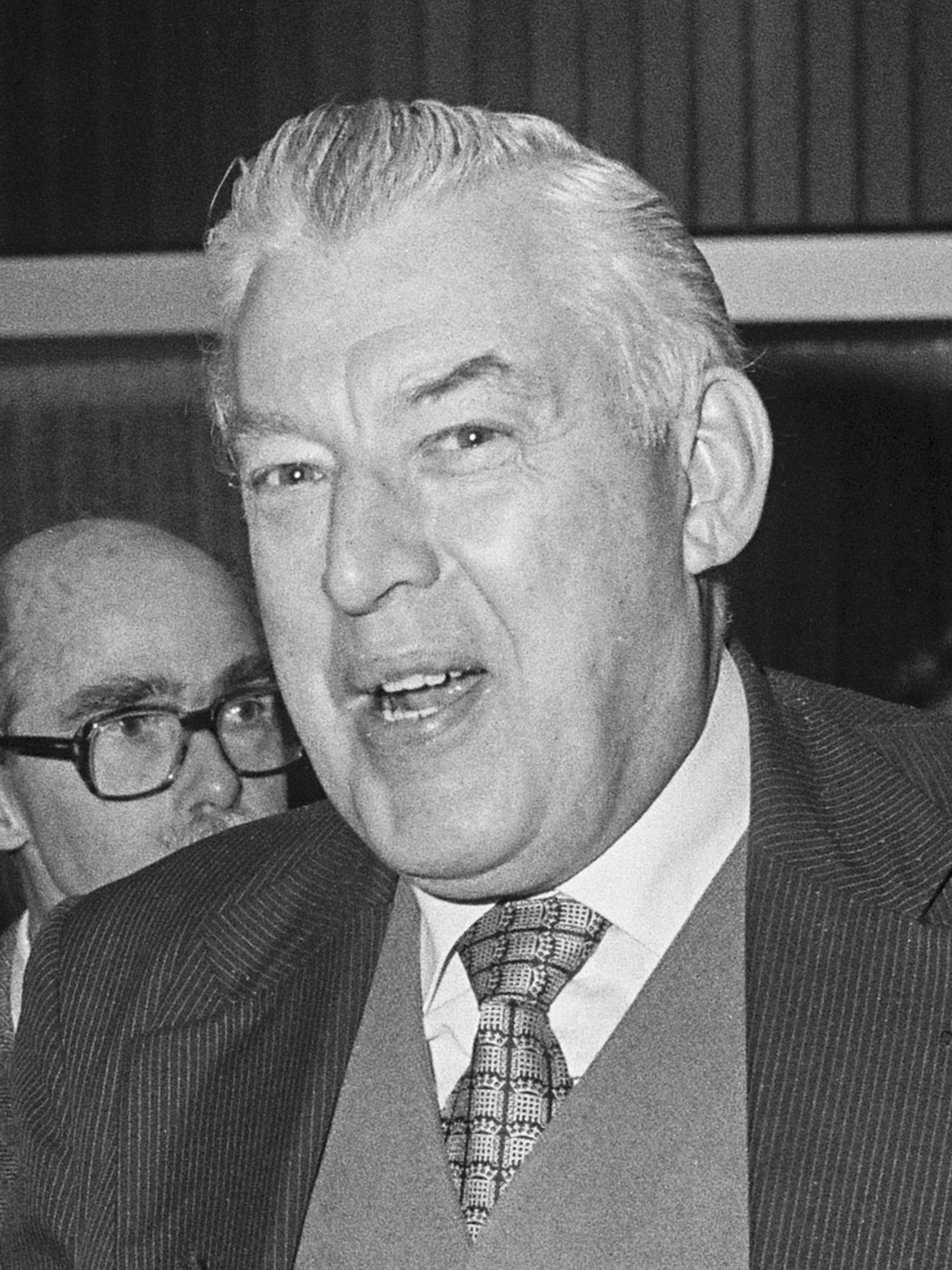

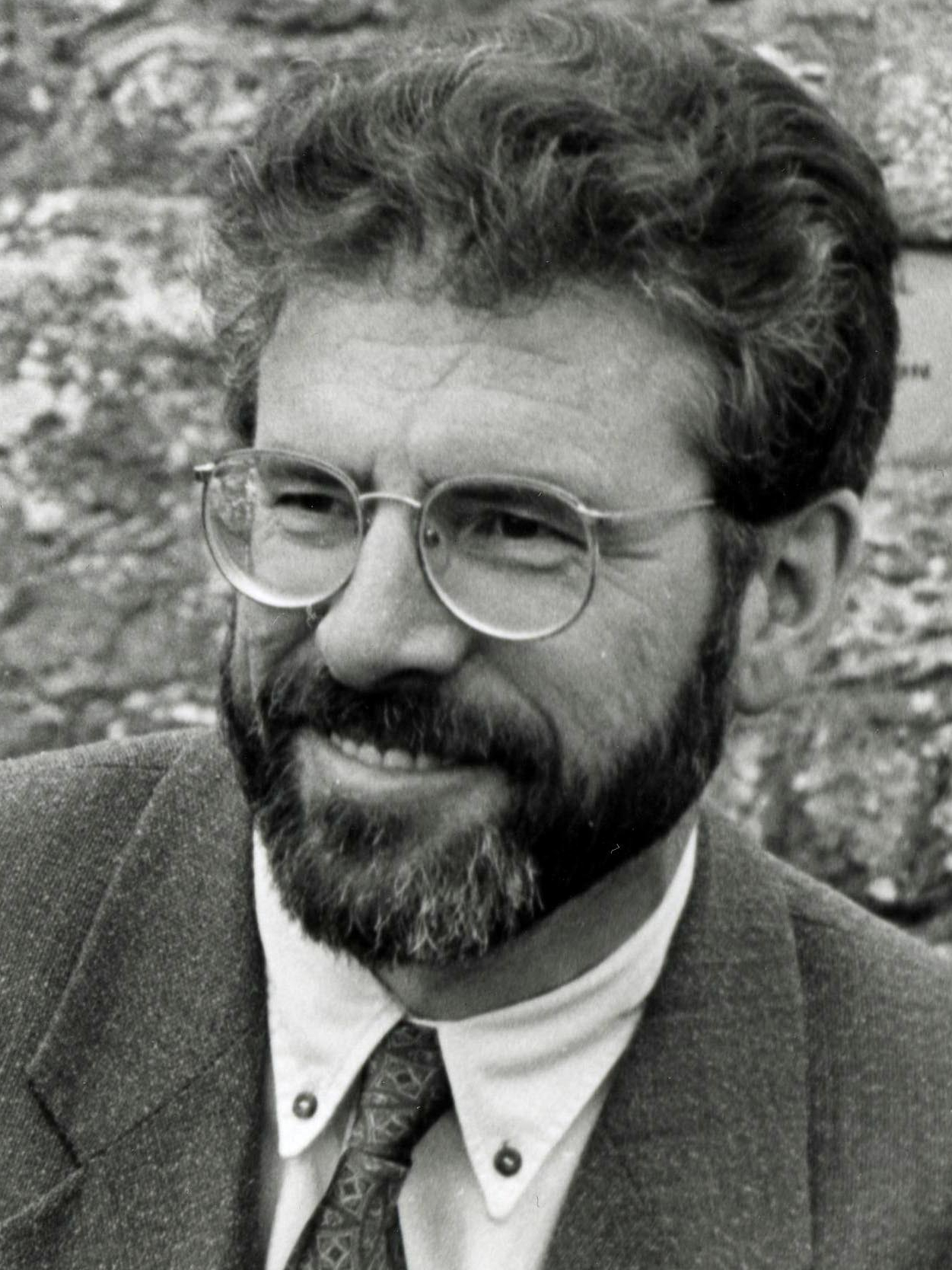

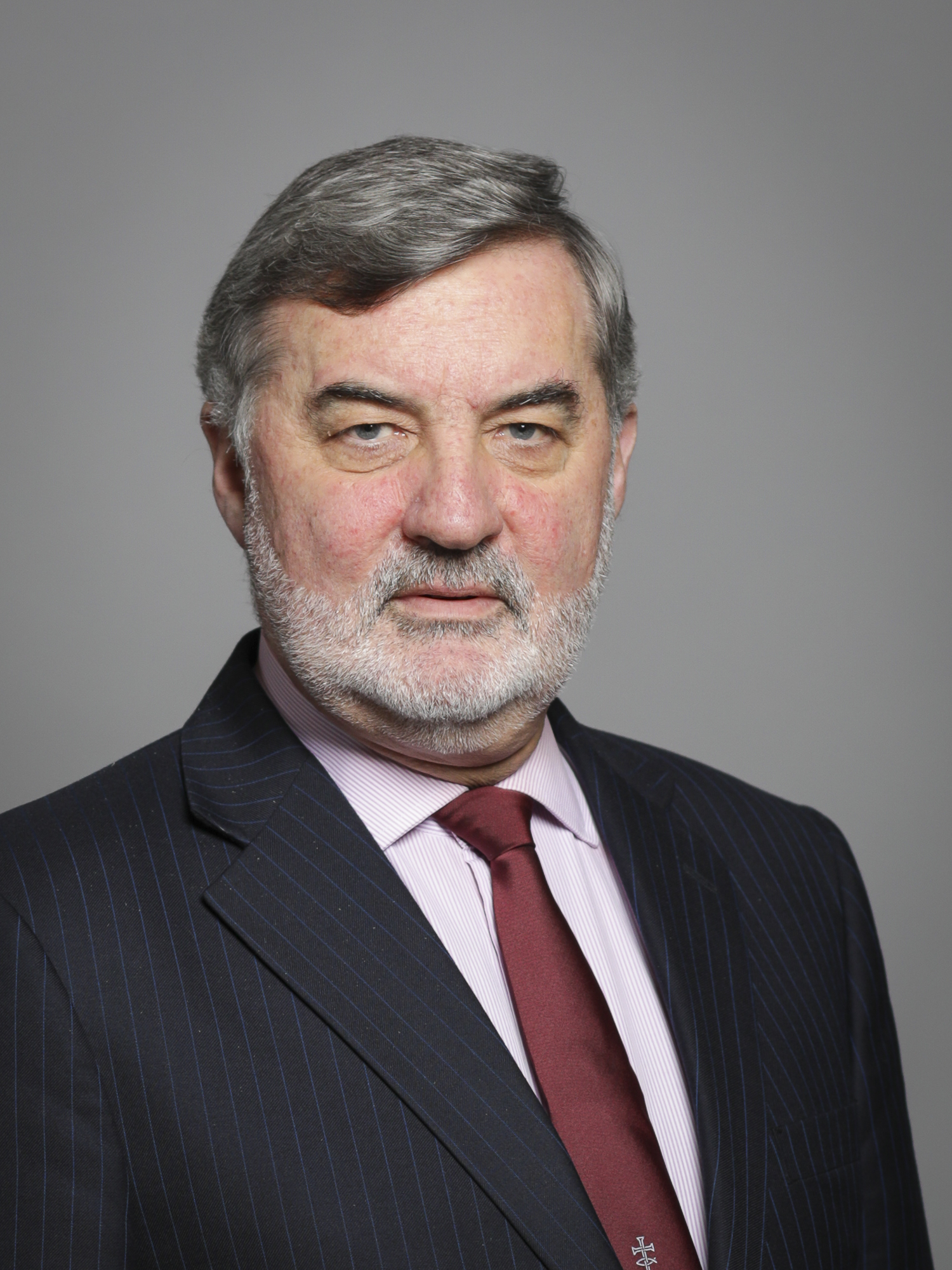

	First party	Second party	Third party
Leader	James Molyneaux	John Hume	Ian Paisley
Party	UUP	SDLP	DUP
Seats won	194	121	110
Seat change	▲5	▲19	▼32
Popular vote	193,064	129,557	109,342
Percentage	31.3%	21.0%	17.7%
Swing	▲1.8%	▲3.2%	▼6.6%
	Fourth party	Fifth party	Sixth party
Leader	Gerry Adams	John Alderdice	N/A
Party	Sinn Féin	Alliance	Independent
Seats won	43	34	23
Seat change	▼16	▲4	▲14
Popular vote	69,032	42,646	23,617
Percentage	11.2%	6.9%	3.8%
Swing	▼0.6%	▼0.1%	▲2.2%
- Colours denote the winning party with outright control

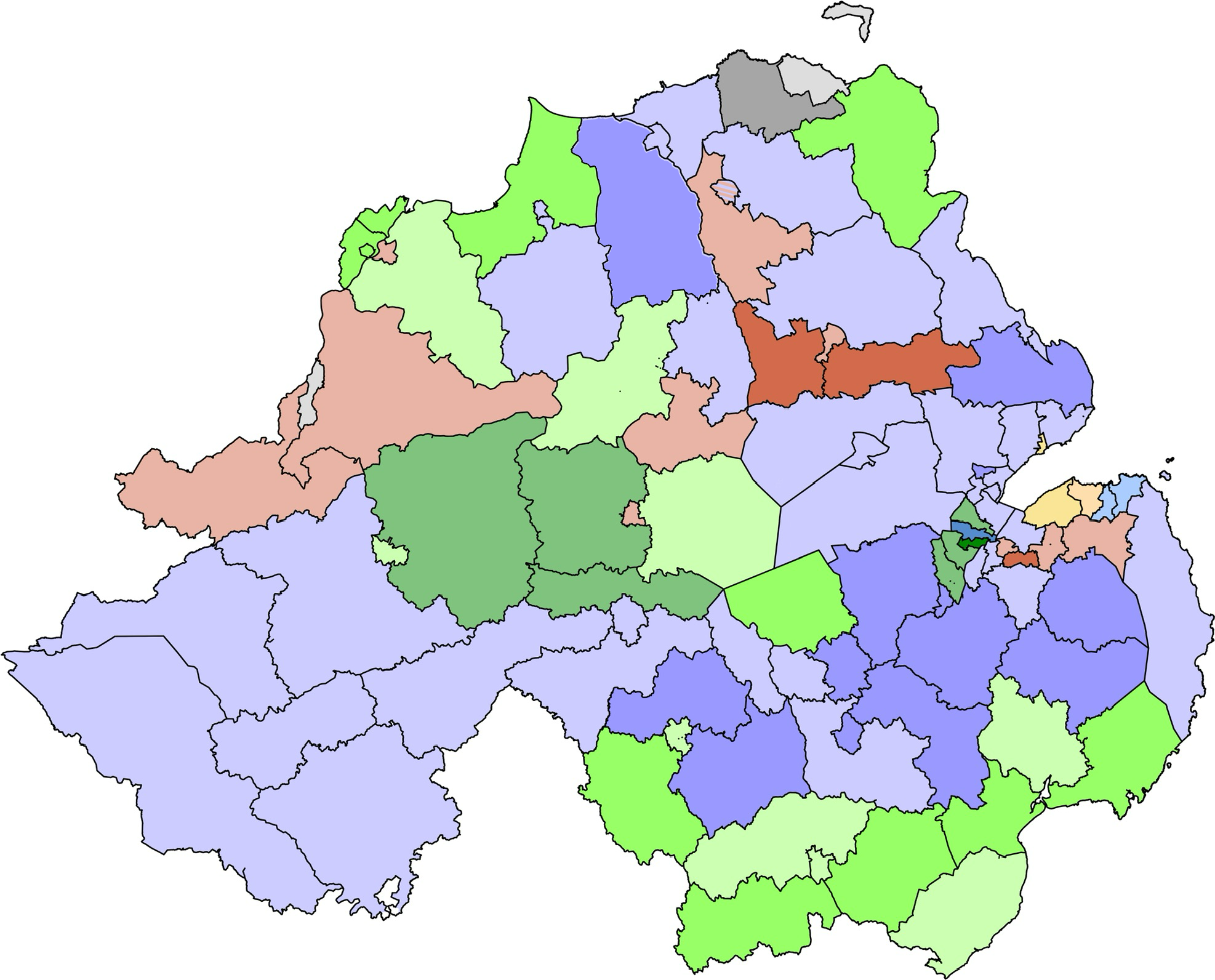
- Colours denote the party with a plurality of first preference votes in each District Electoral Area (in darker-coloured DEAs, the party has a majority of first preference votes)

Elections for local government were held in Northern Ireland in 1989, with candidates contesting 565 seats.

== Background ==
The elections took place after a turbulent period in Northern Irish politics. The signing of the Anglo-Irish Agreement (AIA) in November 1985 had been followed by widespread protests by those in the Unionist community. In November 1985, the 18 Unionist controlled District Councils voted for a policy of adjournment in protest against the AIA and in February 1986 also refused to set the 'rates' (local government taxes). In September 1986 Unionist councillors considered but rejected the option of mass resignations but decided to continue to use council chambers as a forum to protest the agreement.

One new development on the Unionist side was the entry into Northern Ireland politics of the Conservative Party which was joined by three sitting Unionist councillors.

On the Irish Republican side, the Irish Independence Party had disbanded following poor election results in 1985. Sinn Féin had split in 1986 over the issue of sitting in the Irish parliament, Dáil Éireann, if elected. The dissenting faction had formed Republican Sinn Féin (RSF). Three of the fifty nine councillors elected for Sinn Féin in 1985 joined this grouping. The Remembrance Day bombing of 1987 had a negative impact on subsequent SF support. Irish Republicanism was also affected by the passing of the Elected Authorities (Northern Ireland) Act 1989 which disqualified candidates who refused to sign a declaration renouncing:

"(a) any organisation that is for the time being a proscribed organisation specified in Schedule 2 to the Northern Ireland (Emergency Provisions) Act 1978: or
(b) acts of terrorism (that is to say, violence for political ends) connected with the affairs of Northern Ireland"

RSF refused to sign the declaration and thus their twenty three candidates became ineligible.

== Results ==
=== Overall ===
Party	Councillors		Votes	
Party	Total	+/-	% share	Total
UUP	194	+5	31.3	193,064
SDLP	121	+19	21.0	129,557
DUP	110	-32	17.7	109,342
Sinn Féin	43	-16	11.2	69,032
Alliance	38	+4	6.9	42,646
Independent	23	+14	3.8	23,617
Ind. Unionist	15	+7	2.6	15,804
Workers' Party	4	0	2.1	13,078
NI Conservatives	6	N/A	0.8	5,204
PUP	3	0	0.6	3,839
Ulster Democratic	1	+1	0.4	2,413
Protestant Unionist	1	0	0.3	1,879
Protestant	1	+1	0.3	1,754
Labour '87	1	N/A	0.2	1,433
UPUP	3	0	0.2	1,223
Ind. Nationalist	0	-6	0.1	804
Ind. Conservative	1	N/A	0.1	752
Independent Democratic Unionist	0	0	0.1	585
Independent Loyalist	0	0	0.1	351
Green (NI)	0	0	0.1	329
Independent Labour	0	0	0.1	293
Communist	0	0	0.0	175
National Front	0	0	0.0	68

=== By council ===
The results were interpreted as "movement away from the extremes" with the UUP and SDLP increasing their lead over their rivals in the DUP and Sinn Féin respectively. A total of eleven councils saw the two top posts shared by parties from either side of the political/sectarian divide. The number of councils controlled by one party increased from two to six. The DUP retained control of Ballymena, while the UUP retained control of Banbridge and gained control of Antrim and Lisburn. The SDLP gained control of Down and Derry.

==== Antrim ====
Antrim North West
Party	Candidate	1st Pref
UUP	James Graham	1,374
SDLP	Robert Loughran	1,019
DUP	Wilson Clyde	855
Sinn Féin	Henry Cushinan	668
SDLP	Donovan McClelland	405
UUP	Roderick Swann	282
Turnout		4,701
SDLP gain from Sinn Féin		

Antrim South East
Party	Candidate	1st Pref
DUP	Roy Thompson	1,248
UUP	Edgar Wallace	1,043
UUP	Mervyn Rea	876
SDLP	Robert Burns	764
UUP	Howard Campbell	687
DUP	Samuel Dunlop	492
Alliance	David Ford	299
UUP	Roy Stinson	284
Alliance	Theresa Gallagher	242
DUP	James Simpson	210
Turnout		6,311
No change

Antrim Town
Party	Candidate	1st Pref
UUP	Jack Allen	907
UUP	Frederick Marks	741
DUP	James Brown	604
SDLP	Oran Keenan	535
Alliance	James McConnell	355
UUP	Andrew Thompson	244
DUP	James Graham	200
Alliance	Peter Kelly	172
Sinn Féin	Paul Little	171
Workers' Party	Eamon Gillen	158
UUP	Avril Swann	134
Ind. Unionist	Jim Millar	75
Turnout		4,437
UUP gain from DUP		

==== Ards ====
Ards Peninsula
Party	Candidate	1st Pref
Alliance	Kieran McCarthy	1,119
DUP	Jim Shannon	1,030
UUP	John Shields	1,018
UUP	Robert Ambrose	1,008
DUP	Mervyn Rea	584
Independent	James McMullan	564
Alliance	Clifford Auld	512
UUP	Ronald Ferguson	459
DUP	Oliver Johnston	452
UUP	Trevor Hussey	165
Turnout		7,140
Alliance gain from Independent		
UUP gain from UPUP		

Ards West
Party	Candidate	1st Pref
UUP	Robert Gibson	1,375
UUP	Edward Archdale	815
UUP	Bobby McBride	773
Alliance	Thomas McBriar	660
DUP	John Hamilton	651
DUP	David McKibben	619
Alliance	Alan McDowell	387
UUP	William Elliott	273
DUP	Andrew Marks	194
DUP	Glynn Moore	190
Turnout		6,073
No change

Newtownards
Party	Candidate	1st Pref
UUP	Tom Benson	1,307
DUP	Simpson Gibson	1,283
Alliance	Owen Dorrian	719
DUP	Wilbert Magill	548
Independent	John Purdy	473
UUP	David Smyth	452
Ind. Unionist	William Hannigan	434
DUP	John Elliott	408
DUP	Cedric Wilson	228
Alliance	Laurence Thompson	213
UUP	Tom Hamilton	183
UUP	James McKernon	98
Turnout		6,521
Independent gain from NILP		

==== Armagh ====
Armagh City
Party	Candidate	1st Pref
SDLP	John Agnew	1,019
UUP	George McCartney	979
UUP	John Doogan	898
SDLP	Pat Brannigan	893
SDLP	Anna Brolly	816
DUP	Harold Carson	660
Sinn Féin	Seamus Hart	540
Sinn Féin	Stephen Fields	305
Workers' Party	Patrick McCusker	232
Turnout		6,544
SDLP gain from DUP		

Crossmore
Party	Candidate	1st Pref
UUP	Jim Nicholson	1,484
SDLP	Thomas Kavanagh	1,162
SDLP	James McKernan	1,041
SDLP	Charles Mallon	643
Sinn Féin	Thomas Carroll	475
UUP	Thomas Shilliday	440
Turnout		5,403
No change

Cusher
Party	Candidate	1st Pref
UUP	Eric Speers	1,561
DUP	Thomas Black	1,444
UUP	Thomas Johnston	1,314
SDLP	Thomas Canavan	1,154
UUP	Robert Turner	936
UUP	James Clayton	822
Sinn Féin	Margaret McNally	329
Independent Labour	Eugene Turley	100
Turnout		7,811
No change

The Orchard
Party	Candidate	1st Pref
UUP	Jim Speers	1,665
SDLP	John Kernan	1,203
DUP	Douglas Hutchinson	950
UUP	Samuel Foster	855
UUP	Olive Whitten	677
Sinn Féin	Brendan Casey	401
Turnout		5,862
No change

==== Ballymena ====
Ballymena Town
Party	Candidate	1st Pref
SDLP	Patrick McAvoy	897
Alliance	John Williams	832
Independent	Samuel Henry	814
UUP	James Alexander	631
UUP	Robert Coulter	595
DUP	Maurice Mills	485
DUP	John Wilson	442
DUP	John Carson	409
SDLP	Declan O'Loan	403
DUP	Vera Mills	261
UUP	Robert Simpson	186
Turnout		6,085
Alliance gain from DUP		

Braid Valley
Party	Candidate	1st Pref
UUP	Desmond Armstrong	957
Independent	James Woulahan	887
UUP	Margaret Alexander	795
DUP	Samuel Hanna	672
DUP	William Armstrong	510
DUP	Agnes McLeister	507
DUP	Robert Robinson	395
UUP	William Owens	372
Turnout		5,211
Independent gain from DUP		

Kells Water
Party	Candidate	1st Pref
UUP	William Brownlees	929
DUP	Martin Clarke	759
UUP	James Currie	729
DUP	Ronald Fry	512
DUP	David McClintock	509
DUP	James McCosh	499
DUP	Andrew McKendry	381
Ind. Unionist	Melvyn McKendry	219
Turnout		4,675
Ulster Unionist gain from DUP		

The Main
Party	Candidate	1st Pref
DUP	Roy Gillespie	1,068
DUP	Sandy Spence	752
DUP	Thomas Nicholl	749
SDLP	James Laverty	626
UUP	John Johnston	598
DUP	Hubert Nicholl	525
Alliance	David Alderdice	448
UUP	Sarah McCullough	291
UUP	Robert Megaw	258
UUP	John Sutter	150
Turnout		5,583
No change

==== Ballymoney ====
Ballymoney Town
Party	Candidate	1st Pref (Note: Because only five candidates had been nominated for the five seats, there was no vote and all five candidates were declared elected.)
UUP	James McKeown	N/A
UUP	James Simpson	NA
DUP	Cecil Cousley	N/A
DUP	Samuel McConaghie	N/A
Independent	Robert McComb	N/A
Turnout		N/A
No change

Bann Valley
Party	Candidate	1st Pref
UUP	Joe Gaston	790
DUP	Robert Halliday	710
SDLP	Malachy McCamphill	450
SDLP	Charley O'Kane	430
DUP	Robert Wilson	429
Sinn Féin	Una Casey	365
UUP	John Watt	356
DUP	Daniel Taylor	195
Turnout		3,816
SDLP gain from Sinn Féin		

Bushvale
Party	Candidate	1st Pref
UUP	John Ramsay	575
UUP	William Logan	533
SDLP	Harry Connolly	521
DUP	William Kennedy	497
DUP	Donald McKenzie	354
Sinn Féin	Malachy Carey	235
Turnout		2,774
No change

==== Banbridge ====
Banbridge Town
Party	Candidate	1st Pref
UUP	Kathleen Baird	1,549
UUP	Archie McKelvey	836
UUP	John Dobson	782
SDLP	James Walsh	774
DUP	Margaret Walker	486
Alliance	Mary Doyle	343
SDLP	Robert Murray	198
Turnout		5,094
No change

Dromore
Party	Candidate	1st Pref
UUP	Drew Nelson	1,109
SDLP	Catherine McDermott	976
UUP	William Martin	846
UUP	Robert Hill	767
UUP	William McCracken	569
DUP	Robert McIlroy	446
DUP	William Lough	327
Ulster Democratic	Colin Halliday	217
Ulster Democratic	Thomas Dickson	73
Turnout		5,433
UUP gain from DUP		

Knockiveagh
Party	Candidate	1st Pref
DUP	Wilfred McFadden	824
Independent	Laurence McCartan	784
SDLP	Seamus Doyle	739
UUP	Vivienne Bennett	721
UUP	Samuel Walker	699
UUP	John Hanna	526
UUP	Bertie McRoberts	524
SDLP	Peter McGreevy	272
Turnout		5,206
No change

==== Belfast ====
Balmoral
Party	Candidate	1st Pref
UUP	Margaret Crooks	2,163
UUP	Jim Kirkpatrick	1,818
SDLP	Dorita Field	1,636
DUP	Joan Parkes	1,602
Ind. Unionist	Billy Dickson	1,177
Alliance	Mark Long	1,105
Alliance	John Montgomery	1,061
DUP	Caroline Bingham	599
Workers' Party	Shaun McKeown	243
Turnout		12,160
SDLP gain from DUP		

Castle
Party	Candidate	1st Pref
SDLP	Alban Maginness	2,301
UUP	John Carson	2,192
Ind. Unionist	Frank Millar	1,835
DUP	Nigel Dodds	1,779
Ind. Unionist	Nelson McCausland	1,163
Alliance	Tom Campbell	1,053
UUP	Alfred Redpath	767
Workers' Party	Anthony Kerr	496
Sinn Féin	Bobby Lavery	453
DUP	Samuel Lowry	216
Labour '87	Thomas Galloway	103
Green (NI)	Maria O'Sullivan	95
Turnout		12,326
Independent Unionist gain from UUP		

Court
Party	Candidate	1st Pref
PUP	Hugh Smyth	2,533
Protestant Unionist	Elizabeth Seawright	1,408
UUP	Fred Cobain	1,170
DUP	Eric Smyth	1,006
Ind. Unionist	Joe Coggle	953
UUP	Herbert Ditty	897
Independent	William Smith	717
DUP	Frederick Ashby	644
Ind. Unionist	Alfie Ferguson	509
Workers' Party	Peter Cullen	367
Sinn Féin	Joe Austin	240
Turnout		10,825
No change

Laganbank
Party	Candidate	1st Pref
UUP	Dixie Gilmore	1,496
SDLP	Alasdair McDonnell	1,415
Alliance	Steve McBride	1,107
DUP	Rhonda Paisley	1,036
UUP	Jim Clarke	854
Alliance	Mary Thomas	755
UUP	Harry Fletcher	753
Sinn Féin	James Clinton	753
SDLP	Gerard McGettrick	629
Workers' Party	Kevin Smyth	479
Ind. Unionist	Margaret Dickson	198
DUP	Benjamin Horan	132
Labour '87	Paul Hainsworth	109
Communist	Barry Bruton	91
Turnout		10,179
No change

Lower Falls
Party	Candidate	1st Pref
SDLP	Joe Hendron	2,748
Sinn Féin	Fra McCann	2,307
Sinn Féin	Elizabeth Fitzsimons	1,765
Sinn Féin	Richard May	1,626
Sinn Féin	Seán McKnight	1,428
Workers' Party	Mary McMahon	1,093
SDLP	Mary Muldoon	588
Alliance	Derrick Crothers	135
Turnout		12,260
SDLP gain from Alliance		

Oldpark
Party	Candidate	1st Pref
SDLP	Brian Feeney	2,426
UUP	Fred Proctor	1,850
Sinn Féin	Gerard McGuigan	1,682
Workers' Party	Seamus Lynch	1,639
Sinn Féin	Paddy McManus	1,548
Sinn Féin	William McGarry	1,115
Ulster Loyalist Democratic	Paddy Bird	837
DUP	Stanley Mulholland	805
UUP	William Gault	780
Alliance	George Jones	443
Ulster Loyalist Democratic	William Clark	71
Turnout		13,744
UUP gain from DUP		

Pottinger
Party	Candidate	1st Pref
DUP	Sammy Wilson	2,780
UUP	Margaret Clarke	1,480
Alliance	Mervyn Jones	1,296
Ind. Unionist	Dorothy Dunlop	1,179
UUP	Reg Empey	864
DUP	Frank Leslie	768
Sinn Féin	Joe O'Donnell	629
Workers' Party	Sean Flanagan	541
DUP	Jim Walker	493
UUP	David McNutt	420
DUP	John Norris	263
National Front	Stuart McCullough	27
Turnout		11,248
Independent Unionist gain from DUP		

Upper Falls
Party	Candidate	1st Pref
SDLP	Alex Attwood	3,292
Sinn Féin	Alex Maskey	2,378
Sinn Féin	Theresa Holland	2,329
Sinn Féin	Máirtín Ó Muilleoir	1,435
SDLP	Cormac Boomer	1,189
SDLP	Peter Prendiville	713
Independent	Cormac Boomer	378
Workers' Party	Jean Craig	380
Alliance	Dan McGuinness	326
DUP	Robert Morrow	283
Communist	Kevin O'Donnell	84
Turnout		12,835
Sinn Féin gain from Alliance		

Victoria
Party	Candidate	1st Pref
Alliance	John Alderdice	2,933
UUP	Tommy Patton	2,845
UUP	Ian Adamson	1,730
DUP	Wallace Browne	1,374
DUP	Robin Newton	1,171
UUP	Alan Montgomery	767
Alliance	Danny Dow	732
DUP	Irene Lewis	667
Alliance	George Thompson	533
Ind. Unionist	Samuel Walker	449
Workers' Party	Hugh Jordan	333
Turnout		13,901
No change

==== Carrickfergus ====
Carrick Castle
Party	Candidate	1st Pref
Alliance	Sean Neeson	1,029
PUP	Samuel Stewart	472
Protestant Unionist	David Hilditch	302
DUP	Andrew Blair	291
UUP	Samuel McCamley	287
UUP	Robert English	228
DUP	Margaret Cross	190
Independent	Patrick Lennox	171
Alliance	Arthur McQuitty	81
UUP	Sarah Picken	76
Turnout		3,181
Alliance gain from UUP		

Kilroot
Party	Candidate	1st Pref
UUP	Alexander Beggs	739
Alliance	Janet Crampsey	719
Ind. Unionist	Robert Patton	668
UUP	James Brown	599
DUP	William Cross	535
Alliance	David McCann	213
UUP	Eric Ferguson	212
Turnout		3,769
Robert Patton leaves UUP		

Knockagh Monument
Party	Candidate	1st Pref
DUP	William Haggan	668
Alliance	Stewart Dickson	650
Independent	Charles Johnston	628
UUP	William Murray	503
Ind. Unionist	Mary Ardill	435
UUP	Samuel Wilson	312
Protestant Unionist	John Everitt	169
Alliance	Noreen McIlwrath	111
Turnout		3,549
Mary Ardill leaves UUP		

==== Castlereagh ====
Castlereagh Central
Party	Candidate	1st Pref
DUP	Peter Robinson	3,461
UUP	Grant Dillon	914
Alliance	Robert Mitchell	909
UUP	Ellen Gray	453
Alliance	Ann Smith	446
DUP	Alan Carson	277
DUP	Joyce Boyd	184
DUP	Cecil Moore	150
DUP	Paul McNaughten	26
Turnout		6,820
No change

Castlereagh East
Party	Candidate	1st Pref
DUP	Iris Robinson	1,168
DUP	Matthew Anderson	938
Ind. Unionist	William Abraham	756
Alliance	William Boyd	749
UPUP	Thomas Jeffers	509
UUP	John Bell	501
UUP	Alexander Murray	312
Alliance	Muriel Wilkes	257
DUP	John Boyle	196
DUP	Simon Robinson	122
Independent	Michael Brooks	40
Turnout		5,548
UPUP gain from UUP		
William Abraham leaves UUP		

Castlereagh South
Party	Candidate	1st Pref
UUP	John Taylor	2,039
DUP	Ernest Harper	1,954
Alliance	David Andrews	1,364
UUP	James Clarke	667
Alliance	Geraldine Rice	605
DUP	Beatrice Chambers	432
UUP	Frederick Kane	402
UUP	Marie Luney	164
DUP	Thomas Scott	107
DUP	Gillian McCorkell	62
Turnout		7,796
Alliance gain from DUP		

==== Coleraine ====
Bann
Party	Candidate	1st Pref
UUP	William King	1,326
UUP	William Watt	1,185
UUP	Creighton Hutchinson	1,130
SDLP	John Dallat	1,092
DUP	Robert Catherwood	955
SDLP	Gerard O'Kane	625
UUP	John Moody	528
Alliance	Ian McEwan	203
Turnout		7,245
No change

Coleraine Town
Party	Candidate	1st Pref
DUP	James McClure	1,790
UUP	Robert White	1,129
UUP	Gladys Black	818
UUP	David McClarty	607
SDLP	Gerald McLaughlin	433
Independent	Patrick McFeely	405
Alliance	William Mathews	398
DUP	Marie McAllister	187
DUP	William Thompson	118
Labour '87	Timothy Blackman	100
Alliance	Yvonne Boyle	98
Green (NI)	David Garland	56
Workers' Party	Rosemary McBride	39
Turnout		6,329
UUP gain from DUP		

The Skerries
Party	Candidate	1st Pref
UUP	Pauline Armitage	840
UUP	Elizabeth Black	767
DUP	William Creelman	724
UUP	William Glenn	658
Ind. Unionist	Robert Mitchell	509
Alliance	Patrick McGowan	494
SDLP	Sean Farren	482
UUP	Thomas Peacock	432
DUP	Robert Stewart	403
DUP	Eric Stewart	379
Alliance	Catherine Condy	317
Labour '87	Roberta Woods	134
Green (NI)	Malcolm Samuel	71
Turnout		6,359
Robert Mitchell leaves UUP		

==== Cookstown ====
Ballinderry
Party	Candidate	1st Pref
SDLP	Paddy Duffy	1,370
DUP	William McIntyre	1,039
Sinn Féin	Francis McNally	868
UUP	Victor McGahie	781
Sinn Féin	Siobhan McQuillan	617
DUP	Samuel McCartney	528
UUP	Neville Forsythe	512
SDLP	John O'Neill	402
Turnout		6,341
SDLP gain from Sinn Féin		

Cookstown Central
Party	Candidate	1st Pref
UUP	Trevor Wilson	1,337
DUP	Alan Kane	1,325
SDLP	Denis Haughey	855
Sinn Féin	Dermot Coyle	550
SDLP	Peggy Laverty	420
Workers' Party	Hugh Brennan	252
DUP	Kenneth Loughrin	106
Turnout		4,935
SDLP gain from Sinn Féin		

Drum Manor
Party	Candidate	1st Pref
UUP	Samuel Glasgow	1,096
Sinn Féin	Sean Begley	966
DUP	Walter Millar	863
Ind. Unionist	Samuel Parke	747
SDLP	James McGarvey	648
SDLP	Sean Mallon	453
Sinn Féin	Desmond McElhatton	266
Workers' Party	Desmond Gourley	90
Turnout		5,296
No change

==== Craigavon ====
Craigavon Central
Party	Candidate	1st Pref
UUP	James McCammick	1,642
SDLP	James Daly	1,003
DUP	David Calvin	915
UUP	Frederick Crowe	813
Sinn Féin	Sheena Campbell	610
Alliance	John Hagan	605
UUP	Pauline Lindsay	495
UUP	Elizabeth McClurg	457
DUP	Meredith Patterson	406
Workers' Party	Peter Smyth	370
Ind. Unionist	Barrie Bradbury	255
Turnout		7,776
UUP gain from DUP		
Alliance gain from Workers' Party		

Loughside
Party	Candidate	1st Pref
SDLP	Sean McKavanagh	1,393
UUP	Thomas Bell	861
SDLP	Hugh Casey	754
Workers' Party	Tom French	713
Sinn Féin	Brendan Curran	633
SDLP	Catherine McStravick	603
Sinn Féin	John O'Dowd	475
SDLP	Patrick Crilly	424
Turnout		6,047
SDLP gain from UUP		

Lurgan
Party	Candidate	1st Pref
UUP	Sydney Cairns	1,942
UUP	Audrey Savage	1,565
SDLP	Brid Rodgers	1,040
DUP	Ruth Allen	891
DUP	Yvonne Calvert	814
UUP	Samuel Lutton	771
Alliance	Gordon Burrell	586
UUP	Meta Crozier	492
Sinn Féin	Patricia McKee	280
Workers' Party	Maureen McKeever	88
Turnout		8,624
No change

Portadown
Party	Candidate	1st Pref
UUP	James Gillespie	1,583
DUP	Michael Briggs	1,089
SDLP	Ignatius Fox	1,071
UUP	Joe Trueman	887
UUP	Brian Maguinness	730
Alliance	William Ramsay	580
Sinn Féin	John Dignam	523
Independent	Andrew Watson	511
UUP	Anna Moore	449
Independent	Mario McCooe	361
DUP	Phyllis Lutton	209
Workers' Party	Kathy Foy	114
Turnout		8,327
UUP gain from DUP		
Alliance gain from Sinn Féin		

==== Derry ====
Cityside
Party	Candidate	1st Pref
SDLP	Patrick Devine	1,011
Sinn Féin	Hugh Brady	897
SDLP	Tony Carlin	734
Sinn Féin	Mitchel McLaughlin	698
SDLP	Pat Ramsey	664
Sinn Féin	Anne McGuinness	656
SDLP	James Clifford	640
Workers' Party	Eamon Melaugh	358
Sinn Féin	Gerry Doherty	236
Turnout		6,126
No change

Northland
Party	Candidate	1st Pref
SDLP	John Tierney	1,565
SDLP	Anna Gallagher	1,289
Sinn Féin	Bernard McFadden	1,183
SDLP	William McCorriston	1,128
SDLP	John Kerr	977
SDLP	Len Green	778
Ind. Unionist	David Davis	607
UUP	Jack Allen	590
Sinn Féin	Mary Nelis	428
Turnout		8,829
SDLP gain from IIP		
David Davis leaves UUP		

Rural
Party	Candidate	1st Pref
SDLP	Annie Courtney	1,117
DUP	William Hay	1,078
SDLP	John McNickle	1,023
SDLP	George Peoples	946
UUP	John Adams	922
UUP	Ernest Hamilton	636
DUP	Mervyn Lindsay	634
Ind. Nationalist	Michael Breslin	544
SDLP	Robert Brolly	499
UUP	Margaret Parkhill	473
DUP	David Nicholl	461
Ulster Democratic	Ernest Curry	329
Turnout		8,873
No change

Shantallow
Party	Candidate	1st Pref
SDLP	Mary Bradley	1,502
SDLP	Noel McKenna	1,203
SDLP	William O'Connell	1,024
SDLP	Shaun Gallagher	803
Sinn Féin	Gearoid O'Heara	759
Sinn Féin	Richard Halpenny	586
Ind. Nationalist	Thomas Mullan	260
Turnout		6,365
No change

Waterside
Party	Candidate	1st Pref
DUP	Gregory Campbell	1,737
SDLP	Gerald Toland	819
Ind. Unionist	James Guy	783
DUP	Joe Miller	778
SDLP	Wilfred White	732
Sinn Féin	John Carlin	639
UUP	George Duddy	449
Ulster Democratic	Kenneth Kerr	389
UUP	Albert McCartney	367
UUP	Gladys Carey	363
DUP	Robert Hall	315
Ulster Democratic	Ronnie O'Brien	262
Alliance	Snoo Sinclair	238
Turnout		8,030
James Guy leaves UUP		
UDP gain from DUP		

==== Down ====
Ballynahinch
Party	Candidate	1st Pref
SDLP	Patrick Toman	1,222
UUP	James Cochrane	1,204
SDLP	James Magee	985
UUP	Walter Lyons	864
DUP	Thomas Poole	790
SDLP	Patrick King	388
Sinn Féin	Patrick McGreevy	170
Green (NI)	Philip Allen	107
Turnout		5,856
No change

Downpatrick
Party	Candidate	1st Pref
SDLP	Dermot Curran	1,198
UUP	Samuel McCartney	1,110
SDLP	John Ritchie	888
SDLP	Sean Quinn	792
SDLP	Malachi Curran	715
SDLP	John Doris	707
SDLP	Mary Breen	548
Sinn Féin	Geraldine Ritchie	547
Alliance	Michael Healy	534
Workers' Party	Monica Hynds	214
Labour Party of Ireland	William Hampton	193
Turnout		7,599
Alliance gain from Workers' Party		
SDLP gain from Sinn Féin		

Newcastle
Party	Candidate	1st Pref
UUP	Gerald Douglas	1,329
SDLP	Michael Boyd	1,271
SDLP	Eamon O'Neill	1,093
SDLP	Peter Fitzpatrick	542
Sinn Féin	Sean Fitzpatrick	477
DUP	John Finlay	416
SDLP	Cathal O'Baoill	369
UUP	William Brown	366
Workers' Party	Henry Robinson	179
Turnout		6,208
UUP gain from DUP		
SDLP gain from Sinn Féin		

Rowallane
Party	Candidate	1st Pref
SDLP	Margaret Ritchie	1,509
UUP	Samuel Osborne	1,332
UUP	Albert Colmer	781
UUP	William Biggerstaff	740
DUP	William Dick	652
Independent Loyalist	William Walker	351
DUP	William Greer	252
Turnout		5,713
No change

==== Dungannon ====
Blackwater
Party	Candidate	1st Pref
DUP	James Ewing	1,345
UUP	Derek Irwin	1,001
SDLP	Patsy Daly	980
UUP	Jim Hamilton	916
UUP	Jim Brady	884
Sinn Féin	Tony Gildernew	593
Turnout		5,847
No change

Clogher Valley
Party	Candidate	1st Pref
UUP	Noel Mulligan	1,171
UUP	Samuel Brush	1,117
SDLP	Anthony McGonnell	1,061
Sinn Féin	Raymond McMahon	982
DUP	Johnston McIlwrath	919
SDLP	John Monaghan	690
Turnout		6,082
No change

Dungannon Town
Party	Candidate	1st Pref
UUP	Ken Maginnis	1,479
UUP	William Brown	874
DUP	Maurice Morrow	795
Sinn Féin	Peter Corrigan	757
Ind. Nationalist	Michael McLoughlin	600
SDLP	Vincent Currie	570
Workers' Party	Gerry Cullen	276
SDLP	Peggie Devlin	156
Turnout		5,627
Workers' Party gain from Sinn Féin		

Torrent
Party	Candidate	1st Pref
Ind. Nationalist	Jim Canning	1,626
UUP	Thomas Kempton	1,333
Sinn Féin	Brendan Doris	758
Sinn Féin	Martin McCaughey	729
SDLP	Jim Cavanagh	683
Sinn Féin	Sean Corr	550
SDLP	Angela Donnelly	357
SDLP	Bridie O'Donnell	214
Turnout		6,472
No change

==== Fermanagh ====
Enniskillen
Party	Candidate	1st Pref
UUP	Raymond Ferguson	1,639
UUP	Samuel Foster	1,485
Workers' Party	David Kettyles	1,150
DUP	Roy Coulter	803
UUP	William Hetherington	784
SDLP	James Lunny	675
Sinn Féin	Patrick Cox	656
Sinn Féin	John McManus	639
SDLP	James Donnelly	555
Alliance	William Barbour	305
UUP	Bertie Kerr	248
DUP	John Connor	155
Independent	John Bothwell	25
Turnout		9,341
Workers' Party gain from Sinn Féin		

Erne East
Party	Candidate	1st Pref
SDLP	Fergus McQuillan	1,547
UUP	William Noble	1,268
UUP	Albert Liddle	1,059
Sinn Féin	Brian McCaffrey	745
UUP	Jean McVitty	667
Sinn Féin	Vincent McCaffrey	659
Sinn Féin	Plunket O'Neill	611
Independent	John Joe McCusker	473
Sinn Féin	Ciaran Leonard	431
DUP	Paul Robinson	264
Independent	Seamus Mullan	170
DUP	Caroline Madill	128
Turnout		8,177
UUP gain from Sinn Féin		

Erne North
Party	Candidate	1st Pref
UUP	Caldwell McClaughry	1,516
DUP	Bert Johnston	1,114
SDLP	John O'Kane	931
UUP	Simon Loane	812
SDLP	Tommy Gallagher	793
Sinn Féin	Brian McSorley	648
UUP	Gladys Nixon	297
DUP	Victor Milligan	118
Turnout		6,339
SDLP gain from Sinn Féin		

Erne West
Party	Candidate	1st Pref
Independent	Patrick McCaffrey	1,604
UUP	Wilson Elliott	1,397
Sinn Féin	Paul Corrigan	1,186
SDLP	Gerard Gallagher	889
UUP	Derrick Nixon	871
Sinn Féin	Vincent Martin	595
SDLP	Patrick McGovern	256
Turnout		7,001
UUP gain from Sinn Féin		
Patrick McCaffrey leaves IIP		

==== Larne ====
Coast Road
Party	Candidate	1st Pref
UUP	Thomas Robinson	777
Ind. Nationalist	William Cunning	700
DUP	John Fulton	478
Alliance	Amelia Kelly	439
UUP	Joan Drummond	429
DUP	Rachel Rea	413
DUP	Hill Taggart	115
Turnout		3,441
UUP gain from DUP		

Larne Lough
Party	Candidate	1st Pref
UUP	Roy Beggs	1,387
UUP	Thomas Baxter	492
DUP	Bobby McKee	489
Alliance	Thomas Caldwell	411
UUP	Samuel Steele	296
DUP	Andrew Haggan	244
DUP	William Sloan	243
Turnout		3,678
No change

Larne Town
Party	Candidate	1st Pref
DUP	Jack McKee	979
Independent	Pat Buckley	855
UUP	Robert Robinson	580
UUP	Rosalie Armstrong	541
Alliance	Patricia Kay	228
Independent	Roy Craig	215
Alliance	William Geddis	136
DUP	Leonard Sluman	85
Turnout		3,710
Independent gain from DUP		

==== Limavady ====
Bellarena
Party	Candidate	1st Pref
UUP	Stanley Gault	797
SDLP	John McKinney	785
UUP	Robert Grant	696
SDLP	Arthur Doherty	676
SDLP	Thomas Mullan	618
DUP	Ernest Murray	471
Turnout		4,116
SDLP gain from DUP		

Benbradagh
Party	Candidate	1st Pref
SDLP	Lawrence Hegarty	987
UUP	David Robinson	939
Sinn Féin	Thomas Donaghy	793
UUP	Max Gault	446
Sinn Féin	Michael Hasson	343
SDLP	John Lynch	182
Turnout		3,794
SDLP gain from Sinn Féin		

Limavady Town
Party	Candidate	1st Pref
UUP	Ronald Cartwright	961
DUP	George Robinson	915
SDLP	Barry Doherty	686
UUP	Jackie Dolan	482
SDLP	Brian McWilliams	378
UUP	Norman Reynolds	374
Alliance	Joseph McGuigan	241
Turnout		4,112
No change

==== Lisburn ====
Downshire
Party	Candidate	1st Pref
UUP	William Bleakes	2,297
UUP	Thomas Lilburn	1,084
DUP	Charles Poots	1,042
DUP	Anne Blake	998
Alliance	Kenneth Hull	872
UUP	Thomas Davis	666
DUP	James McCann	574
UUP	John Curry	320
UUP	Wilfred Corfield-McClung	171
Workers' Party	Patrick Pollock	63
Turnout		8,262
Thomas Davis leaves DUP		

Dunmurry Cross
Party	Candidate	1st Pref
Sinn Féin	Patrick Rice	1,498
UUP	William McAllister	1,159
Sinn Féin	Michael Ferguson	1,075
DUP	William Beattie	964
UUP	Billy Bell	957
SDLP	William McDonnell	819
SDLP	Hugh Lewsley	808
Workers' Party	John Lowry	761
Alliance	Patrick Bell	684
UUP	Richard Scott	252
Turnout		9,314
SDLP gain from Alliance		

Killultagh
Party	Candidate	1st Pref
UUP	Robert Campbell	2,072
UUP	William Dillon	1,211
DUP	Cecil Calvert	1,202
SDLP	Peter O'Hagan	1,058
UUP	William Lewis	926
UUP	Ronnie Crawford	917
Ind. Conservative	David Greene	752
Alliance	Eileen Drayne	740
DUP	William Stevenson	504
Ulster Democratic	Richard Haggan	235
Workers' Party	Anne-Marie Lowry	72
Turnout		9,830
Independent Conservative gain from DUP		

Lisburn Town
Party	Candidate	1st Pref
UUP	Ivan Davis	2,530
Alliance	Seamus Close	1,307
UUP	William Belshaw	1,049
UUP	Samuel Semple	684
DUP	Robin McMaster	422
DUP	James Mulholland	290
UUP	William Gardiner-Watson	195
UUP	George Morrison	177
Workers' Party	Paul McDonald	141
UUP	Andrew Park	119
Turnout		7,059
Ivan Davis leaves DUP		

==== Magherafelt ====
Magherafelt Town
Party	Candidate	1st Pref
DUP	William McCrea	2,162
SDLP	Patrick Kilpatrick	1,270
UUP	Ernest Caldwell	1,168
Sinn Féin	John Hurl	1,003
SDLP	Margaret O'Hagan	458
DUP	Paul McLean	150
Workers' Party	Marian Donnelly	87
Turnout		6,421
No change

Moyola
Party	Candidate	1st Pref
UUP	John Junkin	1,109
Sinn Féin	Pauline Davey-Kennedy	931
SDLP	Henry McErlean	877
DUP	Thomas Catherwood	694
UUP	Norman Montgomery	611
DUP	Thomas Milligan	559
Sinn Féin	Margaret McKenna	479
SDLP	Francis Madden	367
Workers' Party	Hugh Scullion	200
Turnout		6,009
UUP gain from DUP		

Sperrin
Party	Candidate	1st Pref
UUP	Robert Montgomery	842
Sinn Féin	Bernard O'Hagan	801
Sinn Féin	Patrick Groogan	751
Ind. Nationalist	Mary McSorley	691
SDLP	Ghislaine O'Keeney	674
DUP	John Linton	632
SDLP	Patrick Sweeney	614
SDLP	Frank McKendry	530
Workers' Party	Francis Donnelly	300
Turnout		5,969
Mary McSorley leaves SDLP		
SDLP gain from Sinn Féin		

==== Moyle ====
Ballycastle
Party	Candidate	1st Pref
DUP	Gardiner Kane	385
SDLP	Michael O'Cleary	379
Independent	Seamus Blaney	221
Independent	Archie McAuley	218
UUP	Robert McPherson	218
Independent	James McShane	202
Independent	Christopher McCaughan	160
SDLP	Noel McCurdy	93
Turnout		1,876
Independent gain from Sinn Féin		

Giant's Causeway
Party	Candidate	1st Pref
Ind. Unionist	Robert McIlroy	554
DUP	James Rodgers	370
Ind. Unionist	Price McConaghy	319
UUP	Robert Getty	304
DUP	Glenda Rodgers	137
Ind. Unionist	Ronnie McIlvar	46
Turnout		1,730
No change

The Glens
Party	Candidate	1st Pref
SDLP	Malachy McSparran	468
SDLP	Patrick McBride	344
Sinn Féin	James McCarry	331
Ind. Nationalist	Randal McDonnell	297
SDLP	Joseph Mitchell	284
DUP	Elizabeth White	251
SDLP	Daniel Anderson	188
Independent	Michael Brogan	168
Turnout		2,331
No change

==== Newry and Mourne ====
Crotlieve
Party	Candidate	1st Pref
SDLP	P. J. Bradley	1,488
UUP	Violet Cromie	1,378
SDLP	Hugh Carr	1,081
SDLP	Brian Mulligan	998
SDLP	Jim McCart	993
Ind. Nationalist	Ciaran Mussen	954
SDLP	Patrick Maginn	766
SDLP	Felix O'Hare	557
UUP	John Fisher	515
Sinn Féin	Anne Marie Willis	389
Turnout		9,375
SDLP gain from UUP		

Newry Town
Party	Candidate	1st Pref
Ind. Nationalist	Eugene Markey	973
SDLP	Frank Feely	957
SDLP	Arthur Ruddy	892
UUP	William McCaigue	865
SDLP	Sean Gallogly	818
Sinn Féin	Brendan Curran	741
SDLP	Patrick McElroy	614
Independent	Louis Morgan	535
Sinn Féin	Eileen Morgan	470
SDLP	John McArdle	440
Workers' Party	Kevin Morgan	264
Ind. Nationalist	James McKevitt	215
SDLP	Teddy McLoughlin	202
Independent	Peter McKevitt	215
Independent	Noel Sloan	134
Independent	Patrick Ruddy	36
Turnout		8,630
Eugene Markey leaves IIP		

Slieve Gullion
Party	Candidate	1st Pref
SDLP	John Fee	1,207
SDLP	Pat Toner	1,174
Sinn Féin	Jim McAllister	1,035
SDLP	Michael O'Neill	995
Sinn Féin	James McCreesh	756
Sinn Féin	Patrick McDonald	540
Ind. Republican	Brian Woods	208
Turnout		6,207
No change

The Fews
Party	Candidate	1st Pref
UUP	Danny Kennedy	1,406
SDLP	Stephen McGinn	1,158
SDLP	James Savage	1,103
SDLP	Charles Smyth	1,103
UUP	William Moffett	1,056
Sinn Féin	Conor Murphy	705
DUP	Gordon Heslip	554
Sinn Féin	Patrick Quinn	487
Workers' Party	Brian Mulligan	96
Turnout		7,951
SDLP gain from DUP		

The Mournes
Party	Candidate	1st Pref
Protestant Unionist	George Graham	1,754
SDLP	Desmond Haughian	1,309
UUP	Henry Reilly	1,178
SDLP	Austin Crawford	950
UUP	William Coulter	634
DUP	George McConnell	589
Independent	Mark Brennan	339
Sinn Féin	Gabriel Curran	213
Turnout		7,150
George Graham leaves DUP		

==== Newtownabbey ====
Antrim Line
Party	Candidate	1st Pref
Alliance	James Rooney	908
DUP	Tommy Kirkham	800
UUP	James Smith	775
UUP	William Green	718
SDLP	Thomas McTeague	684
UUP	Ivan Hunter	414
DUP	Billy McDonnell	235
Workers' Party	Brendan Harrison	142
Labour Party NI	Thomas Davidson	111
Turnout		4,893
SDLP gain from DUP		

Ballyclare
Party	Candidate	1st Pref
UUP	Stephen Turkington	969
Ind. Unionist	Arthur Templeton	863
UUP	Thomas Downes	721
Ind. Unionist	Sidney Cameron	565
DUP	Samuel Cameron	431
DUP	Samuel Gardiner	359
Alliance	Trevor Strain	323
Independent	Leonard Hardy	281
Turnout		4,618
UUP gain from Independent		

Doagh Road
Party	Candidate	1st Pref
UUP	Fraser Agnew	761
Labour Party NI	Bob Kidd	712
DUP	Billy Snoddy	604
UUP	Andrew Beattie	526
Alliance	John Blair	334
Independent Democratic Unionist	David Hollis	246
UUP	Winifred Wright	109
Sinn Féin	Liam Collins	96
Workers' Party	James Magee	78
National Front	David Kerr	41
Turnout		3,625
Alliance gain from DUP		

Manse Road
Party	Candidate	1st Pref
UUP	George Herron	1,762
UUP	James Robinson	914
Alliance	Gordon Mawhinney	725
DUP	Samuel Neill	713
UUP	Joseph Kell	303
Workers' Party	Brendan Heaney	175
Independent Democratic Unionist	Thomas Buchanan	99
Turnout		4,825
Alliance gain from DUP		

Shore Road
Party	Candidate	1st Pref
UUP	Barbara Gilliland	1,008
UUP	Ken Robinson	973
DUP	Billy Boyd	950
Alliance	William McKimmon	769
Independent Democratic Unionist	William Ball	240
Labour Party NI	David Lowrie	164
DUP	Jean Boyd	150
Turnout		4,402
No change

==== North Down ====
Abbey
Party	Candidate	1st Pref
UPUP	Valerie Kinghan	745
NI Conservatives	George Green	536
UPUP	Cecil Braniff	478
DUP	Denny Vitty	429
UUP	Irene Cree	349
DUP	Ivy Cooling	323
Alliance	James Magee	299
DUP	George McMurtry	298
NI Conservatives	Shirley McCann	250
Alliance	Miriam Judge	228
UUP	Edward Johnston	119
UUP	Robert Todd	42
Turnout		4,284
George Green leaves UUP		
UPUP gain from DUP		

Ballyholme and Groomsport
Party	Candidate	1st Pref
UUP	Robin Cree	864
Alliance	Jane Copeland	711
NI Conservatives	Bruce Mulligan	611
Ind. Unionist	Edmund Mills	578
NI Conservatives	Ivan Thompson	573
Alliance	Donald Hayes	484
DUP	Alan Leslie	429
UUP	Samuel Mellon	356
NI Conservatives	Bill McLean	319
DUP	Robert Gordon	250
UUP	Ian Henry	166
Alliance	William Johnston	123
Turnout		5,614
Bruce Mulligan leaves UUP		
NI Conservatives gain from Alliance		

Bangor West
Party	Candidate	1st Pref
UUP	Hazel Bradford	698
Alliance	Brian Wilson	697
NI Conservatives	Thomas Miskelly	626
NI Conservatives	James O'Fee	573
NI Conservatives	Jack Preston	537
Independent	Ann-Marie Hillen	537
DUP	William Baxter	462
Alliance	William Baillie	414
UUP	Roy Bradford	403
UUP	Terence McKeag	396
DUP	Alan Graham	347
PUP	Thomas O'Brien	316
Independent	Colin Simpson	211
Alliance	Eileen Bell	145
DUP	Elizabeth McMurtry	135
PUP	Samuel Meneely	9
Turnout		6,653
NI Conservatives gain from DUP and UPUP
Independent gain from Alliance

Holywood
Party	Candidate	1st Pref
NI Conservatives	Laurence Kennedy	775
Independent	Dennis Ogborn	695
Alliance	Susan O'Brien	660
UUP	Ellie McKay	589
DUP	Gordon Dunne	561
Alliance	Paul de Haan	552
UUP	McConnell Auld	473
NI Conservatives	Alice Kennedy	269
NI Conservatives	Michael Weir	135
UUP	Ian Sinclair	93
Turnout		4,918
NI Conservatives gain from UUP
Independent gain from Alliance

==== Omagh ====
Mid Tyrone
Party	Candidate	1st Pref
Sinn Féin	Patrick McMahon	1,186
UUP	Desmond Anderson	906
Independent	Brian McGrath	872
Sinn Féin	Barney McAleer	788
SDLP	Seamus Shields	735
Sinn Féin	Sean Clarke	700
UUP	William Thompson	685
SDLP	Nuala McSherry	601
DUP	Willis Cooke	486
DUP	Tommy Armstrong	324
Workers' Party	Patrick McClean	244
Alliance	Ethne McClelland	167
Turnout		7,967
Brian McGrath leaves IIP		
UUP gain from DUP		

Omagh Town
Party	Candidate	1st Pref
DUP	Oliver Gibson	1,058
SDLP	Johnny McLaughlin	820
SDLP	Paddy McGowan	754
UUP	Wilfred Breen	736
Sinn Féin	Francis Mackey	696
Workers' Party	James Doody	335
SDLP	Stephen McKenna	330
SDLP	Arthur Breen	325
Alliance	Patrick Bogan	305
DUP	Stanley Johnston	260
UUP	Rachel Hussey	208
Sinn Féin	Colm Grimes	143
Alliance	Eric Bullick	115
Turnout		6,264
Johnny McLaughlin joins SDLP		

West Tyrone
Party	Candidate	1st Pref
UUP	Arthur McFarland	1,314
SDLP	Liam McQuaid	1,112
Sinn Féin	Gerry McMenamin	838
DUP	Harry Cairns	832
UUP	George Rainey	830
Sinn Féin	Cecilia Quinn	762
SDLP	James Connolly	489
SDLP	Gregory McMullan	421
Workers' Party	Tommy Owens	316
Sinn Féin	William McLaughlin	218
Alliance	Ann Gormley	213
DUP	Raymond Farrell	136
DUP	Raymond Little	136
Turnout		7,845
No change

==== Strabane ====
Derg
Party	Candidate	1st Pref
UUP	Edward Turner	1,050
DUP	Thomas Kerrigan	970
Sinn Féin	Charles McHugh	928
Ind. Unionist	Derek Hussey	827
SDLP	Laurence McNamee	589
Independent	Denis McCrory	443
DUP	Desmond Monteith	426
Sinn Féin	Tomas MacNamee	240
Alliance	James Smyth	63
Turnout		5,711
Independent Unionist gain from DUP		
SDLP gain from Independent		

Glenelly
Party	Candidate	1st Pref
UUP	James Emery	1,359
DUP	John Donnell	1,118
SDLP	John Gallagher	1,035
DUP	Samuel Rogers	737
Sinn Féin	Martin Forbes	526
SDLP	Brian Logue	225
Alliance	Hughes Colhoun	124
Turnout		5,280
Alliance gain from Sinn Féin		

Mourne
Party	Candidate	1st Pref
Sinn Féin	Ivan Barr	1,327
Ind. Nationalist	Margaret McManus	1,123
UUP	John Cummings	949
Ind. Nationalist	James O'Kane	879
SDLP	Joseph McElroy	641
Sinn Féin	Ultan McNulty	463
SDLP	Bernard Mullen	254
SDLP	Bernard McDermott	211
Turnout		6,058
Margaret McManus leaves SDLP		
