= 1989 Cookstown District Council election =

Local govt election in Northern Ireland

- 17 May 1989

All 16 seats to Cookstown District Council 9 seats needed for a majority
	First party	Second party	Third party
Party	SDLP	DUP	UUP
Seats won	5	5	3
Seat change	▲2	0	0
	Fourth party	Fifth party
Party	Sinn Féin	Ind. Unionist
Seats won	2	1
Seat change	▼2	0

Elections to Cookstown District Council were held on 17 May 1989 on the same day as the other Northern Irish local government elections. The election used three district electoral areas to elect a total of 16 councillors.

== Election results ==
Cookstown District Council Election Result 1989
Party	Seats	Gains	Losses	Net gain/loss	Seats %	Votes %	Votes	+/−
SDLP	5	2	0	▲2	31.3	25.8	4,148	▲4.8
DUP	5	0	0	0	31.3	24.0	3,861	▼2.6
UUP	3	0	0	0	18.8	23.2	3,726	▲2.1
Sinn Féin	2	0	2	▼2	12.5	20.3	3,267	▼5.3
Ind. Unionist	1	0	0	0	6.3	4.6	747	▲1.7
Workers' Party	0	0	0	0	0.0	2.1	342	▼0.4

Note: "Votes" are the first preference votes.

== Districts summary ==
Results of the Cookstown District Council election, 1989 by district
Ward	%	Cllrs	%	Cllrs	%	Cllrs	%	Cllrs	%	Cllrs	Total Cllrs
Ward	SDLP		DUP		UUP		Sinn Féin		Others		Total Cllrs
Ballinderry	29.0	2	25.6	2	21.1	1	24.3	1	0.0	0	6
Cookstown Central	26.3	2	29.5	2	27.6	1	11.4	0	5.2	0	5
Drum Manor	21.5	1	16.8	1	21.4	1	24.0	1	16.3	1	5
Total	25.8	5	24.0	5	23.2	3	20.3	2	6.7	1	16

== District results ==
=== Ballinderry ===
1985: 2 x DUP, 2 x Sinn Féin, 1 x SDLP, 1 x UUP
1989: 2 x DUP, 2 x SDLP, 1 x Sinn Féin, 1 x UUP
1985-1989 Change: SDLP gain from Sinn Féin

Ballinderry - 6 seats
Party	Candidate	FPv%	Count					
Party	Candidate	FPv%	1	2	3	4	5	6
SDLP	Paddy Duffy*	22.40%	1,370					
DUP	William McIntyre*	16.99%	1,039					
Sinn Féin	Francis McNally*	14.19%	868	920.54				
UUP	Victor McGahie*	12.77%	781	782.11	811.66	1,208.66		
DUP	Samuel McCartney*	8.63%	528	528	648.6	764.54	1,088.84	
SDLP	John O'Neill	6.57%	402	810.11	810.41	811.41	819.87	889.43
Sinn Féin	Siobhan McQuillan	10.09%	617	636.61	636.76	637.5	637.5	637.5
UUP	Neville Forsythe	8.37%	512	514.59	518.79			
Electorate: 7,775 Valid: 6,117 (78.68%) Spoilt: 224 Quota: 874 Turnout: 6,341 (81.56%)

=== Cookstown Central ===
1985: 2 x DUP, 1 x SDLP, 1 x UUP, 1 x Sinn Féin
1989: 2 x DUP, 2 x SDLP, 1 x UUP
1985-1989 Change: SDLP gain from Sinn Féin

Cookstown Central - 5 seats
Party	Candidate	FPv%	Count					
Party	Candidate	FPv%	1	2	3	4	5	6
UUP	Trevor Wilson	27.60%	1,337					
DUP	Alan Kane*	27.35%	1,325					
SDLP	Denis Haughey*	17.65%	855					
DUP	Kenneth Loughrin*	2.19%	106	609.89	1,116.89			
SDLP	Margaret Laverty	8.67%	420	425.33	428.45	456.14	589.57	628.67
Sinn Féin	Dermot Coyle	11.35%	550	550	550.39	551.17	618.9	620.65
Workers' Party	Hugh Brennan	5.20%	252	262.66	263.83	317.26		
Electorate: 6,722 Valid: 4,845 (72.08%) Spoilt: 90 Quota: 808 Turnout: 4,935 (73.42%)

=== Drum Manor ===
1985: 1 x Sinn Féin, 1 x SDLP, 1 x UUP, 1 x DUP, 1 x Independent Unionist
1989: 1 x Sinn Féin, 1 x SDLP, 1 x UUP, 1 x DUP, 1 x Independent Unionist
1985-1989 Change: No change

Drum Manor - 5 seats
Party	Candidate	FPv%	Count				
Party	Candidate	FPv%	1	2	3	4	5
UUP	Samuel Glasgow*	21.37%	1,096				
Sinn Féin	Sean Begley	18.83%	966				
DUP	Walter Millar*	16.83%	863				
Ind. Unionist	Samuel Parke*	14.56%	747	977.56			
SDLP	James McGarvey*	12.63%	648	649.32	668.68	706.68	775.68
SDLP	Sean Mallon	8.83%	453	453.22	458.28	487.26	512.48
Sinn Féin	Desmond McElhatton	5.19%	266	266.22	266.44	278.44	
Workers' Party	Desmond Gourley	1.75%	90	92.42	115.08		
Electorate: 6,167 Valid: 5,129 (83.17%) Spoilt: 167 Quota: 855 Turnout: 5,296 (85.88%)
