= 1997 Cookstown District Council election =

Local govt election in Northern Ireland

← 1993	21 May 1997	2001 →

All 16 seats to Cookstown District Council 9 seats needed for a majority
	First party	Second party	Third party
Party	Sinn Féin	SDLP	UUP
Seats won	5	4	4
Seat change	▲3	▼1	▼1
	Fourth party	Fifth party
Party	DUP	Ind. Unionist
Seats won	2	1
Seat change	▼1	0
- Results by district electoral area, shaded by First Preference Votes.

Elections to Cookstown District Council were held on 21 May 1997 on the same day as the other Northern Irish local government elections. The election used three district electoral areas to elect a total of 16 councillors.

== Election results ==
Cookstown District Council Election Result 1997
Party	Seats	Gains	Losses	Net gain/loss	Seats %	Votes %	Votes	+/−
Sinn Féin	5	3	0	▲3	31.3	28.0	4,926	▲7.3
SDLP	4	0	1	▼1	25.0	25.4	4,466	▼4.6
UUP	4	0	1	▼1	25.0	23.7	4,174	▼2.8
DUP	2	0	1	▼1	12.5	18.4	3,233	▲0.9
Ind. Unionist	1	0	0	0	6.3	4.2	741	▼0.6
Ind. Nationalist	0	0	0	0	0.0	0.3	53	▲0.3

Note: "Votes" are the first preference votes.

== Districts summary ==
Results of the Cookstown District Council election, 1997 by district
Ward	%	Cllrs	%	Cllrs	%	Cllrs	%	Cllrs	%	Cllrs	Total Cllrs
Ward	Sinn Féin		SDLP		UUP		DUP		Others		Total Cllrs
Ballinderry	28.9	2	29.5	2	19.3	1	21.5	1	0.8	0	6
Cookstown Central	22.5	1	25.7	1	31.6	2	20.2	1	0.0	0	5
Drum Manor	32.1	2	19.8	1	21.7	1	12.7	0	13.7	1	5
Total	28.0	5	25.4	4	23.7	4	18.4	2	4.5	1	16

== District results ==
=== Ballinderry ===
1993: 2 x SDLP, 2 x UUP, 1 x Sinn Féin, 1 x DUP
1997: 2 x SDLP, 2 x Sinn Féin, 1 x UUP, 1 x DUP
1993-1997 Change: Sinn Féin gain from UUP

Ballinderry - 6 seats
Party	Candidate	FPv%	Count							
Party	Candidate	FPv%	1	2	3	4	5	6	7	8
SDLP	Patsy McGlone*	22.32%	1,555							
Sinn Féin	Patrick McAleer	21.79%	1,518							
Sinn Féin	Seamus Campbell	7.13%	497	580.98	1,061.58					
DUP	Anne McCrea*	14.01%	976	977.9	978.62	982.12	1,451.12			
SDLP	Mary Baker	7.13%	497	912.72	935.76	983.68	985.06	986.06	1,048.08	
UUP	Thomas Greer*	8.87%	618	619.52	620.24	624.24	664.6	940.6	940.88	941.72
UUP	William Armstrong	10.55%	735	736.9	736.9	736.9	745.66	890.66	890.66	892.62
DUP	Samuel McCartney	7.45%	519	520.52	521.24	522.24				
Ind. Nationalist	Francis Rocks*	0.76%	53	93.66	103.02					
Electorate: 8,536 Valid: 6,968 (81.63%) Spoilt: 125 Quota: 996 Turnout: 7,093 (83.10%)

=== Cookstown Central ===
1993: 2 x UUP, 2 x SDLP, 1 x DUP
1997: 2 x UUP, 1 x SDLP, 1 x DUP, 1 x Sinn Féin
1993-1997 Change: Sinn Féin gain from SDLP

Cookstown Central - 5 seats
Party	Candidate	FPv%	Count					
Party	Candidate	FPv%	1	2	3	4	5	6
UUP	Trevor Wilson*	27.37%	1,427					
Sinn Féin	Sean Begley*	22.48%	1,172					
DUP	William John Larmour*	16.55%	863	996.77				
SDLP	Denis Haughey*	16.40%	855	859.68	1,090.48			
UUP	William Joseph Larmour	4.24%	221	581.36	581.76	581.76	745.42	855.01
SDLP	Margaret Laverty*	9.34%	487	489.34	558.54	741.34	746.52	748.86
DUP	Raymond McGarvey	3.62%	189	237.36	238.96	241.76		
Electorate: 7,474 Valid: 5,214 (69.76%) Spoilt: 94 Quota: 870 Turnout: 5,308 (71.02%)

=== Drum Manor ===
1993: 1 x Sinn Féin, 1 x UUP, 1 x SDLP, 1 x DUP, 1 x Independent Unionist
1997: 2 x Sinn Féin, 1 x UUP, 1 x SDLP, 1 x Independent Unionist
1993-1997 Change: Sinn Féin gain from DUP

Drum Manor - 5 seats
Party	Candidate	FPv%	Count				
Party	Candidate	FPv%	1	2	3	4	5
Sinn Féin	Finbar Conway	26.72%	1,446				
UUP	Samuel Glasgow*	21.68%	1,173				
SDLP	James McGarvey*	12.86%	696	717.28	1,025.28		
Ind. Unionist	Samuel Parke*	13.69%	741	741.38	745.38	910.29	
Sinn Féin	John McNamee	5.41%	293	774.08	820.84	820.84	941.84
DUP	William Cuddy*	12.68%	686	686	691.14	790.04	791.04
SDLP	Peter Cassidy	6.95%	376	405.64			
Electorate: 6,595 Valid: 5,411 (82.05%) Spoilt: 88 Quota: 902 Turnout: 5,499 (83.38%)
