= 1985 Cookstown District Council election =

Local govt election in Northern Ireland

- 15 May 1985

All 16 seats to Cookstown District Council 9 seats needed for a majority
	First party	Second party	Third party
Party	DUP	Sinn Féin	UUP
Seats won	5	4	3
Seat change	▲2	▲4	▼1
	Fourth party	Fifth party	Sixth party
Party	SDLP	Ind. Unionist	UUUP
Seats won	3	1	0
Seat change	▼2	▲1	▼1
	Seventh party	Eighth party
Party	Independent	Ind. Republican
Seats won	0	0
Seat change	▼1	▼1

Elections to Cookstown District Council were held on 15 May 1985 on the same day as the other Northern Irish local government elections. The election used three district electoral areas to elect a total of 16 councillors.

== Election results ==
Cookstown District Council Election Result 1985
Party	Seats	Gains	Losses	Net gain/loss	Seats %	Votes %	Votes	+/−
DUP	5	2	0	▲2	31.3	26.6	4,405	▲2.3
Sinn Féin	4	4	0	0	25.0	25.6	4,226	New
UUP	3	0	1	▼1	18.8	21.1	3,492	▼3.6
SDLP	3	0	2	▼2	18.8	21.0	3,464	▼10.4
Ind. Unionist	1	1	0	▲1	6.3	2.9	487	▲2.9
Workers' Party	0	0	0	0	0.0	2.5	408	▲2.5
Independent	0	0	0	▼1	0.0	0.3	45	▼10.5

Note: "Votes" are the first preference votes.

== Districts summary ==
Results of the Cookstown District Council election, 1985 by district
Ward	%	Cllrs	%	Cllrs	%	Cllrs	%	Cllrs	%	Cllrs	Total Cllrs
Ward	DUP		Sinn Féin		UUP		SDLP		Others		Total Cllrs
Ballinderry	26.5	2	29.3	2	18.2	1	25.3	1	0.7	0	6
Cookstown Central	31.8	2	15.6	1	25.7	1	18.9	1	8.0	0	5
Drum Manor	21.8	1	30.8	1	20.3	1	17.7	1	9.4	1	5
Total	26.6	5	25.6	4	21.1	3	21.0	3	5.7	1	16

== District results ==
=== Ballinderry ===
1985: 2 x DUP, 2 x Sinn Féin, 1 x SDLP, 1 x UUP

Ballinderry - 6 seats
Party	Candidate	FPv%	Count						
Party	Candidate	FPv%	1	2	3	4	5	6	7
DUP	William McIntyre*	19.33%	1,215						
Sinn Féin	Patrick McAleer	16.57%	1,042						
SDLP	Paddy Duffy*	14.25%	896	897.56	901.56				
Sinn Féin	Francis McNally	12.76%	802	802.26	802.26	918.46			
UUP	Victor McGahie*	10.08%	634	671.44	684.44	685.14	685.14	1,111.14	
DUP	Samuel McCartney	7.13%	448	712.42	723.94	724.78	725.78	808.88	1,017.68
SDLP	Joseph Davidson*	6.52%	410	410.26	414.26	426.44	673.98	684.98	687.98
UUP	Andrew Booth	8.08%	508	517.36	528.14	528.14	531.14		
SDLP	John O'Neill	4.56%	287	287	288	292.9			
Independent	Eric Brown	0.72%	45	46.3					
Electorate: 7,587 Valid: 6,287 (82.87%) Spoilt: 149 Quota: 899 Turnout: 6,436 (84.83%)

=== Cookstown Central ===
1985: 2 x DUP, 1 x UUP, 1 x SDLP, 1 x Sinn Féin

Cookstown Central - 5 seats
Party	Candidate	FPv%	Count					
Party	Candidate	FPv%	1	2	3	4	5	6
DUP	Alan Kane*	28.33%	1,444					
UUP	Espie Donaldson*	21.35%	1,088					
SDLP	Brigid Neeson*	11.10%	566	566	566.44	937.44		
DUP	Kenneth Loughrin*	3.49%	178	721.66	789.86	790.08	790.08	947.08
Sinn Féin	Christopher Neeson	15.62%	796	796	796	809	829.48	830.52
Workers' Party	Patrick Bloomer	8.00%	408	410.87	413.29	424.92	484.76	539.33
UUP	Edmund Giboney	4.32%	220	257.31	421.65	425.55	430.03	
SDLP	Margaret Laverty*	7.79%	397	399.87	400.97			
Electorate: 6,314 Valid: 5,097 (80.73%) Spoilt: 62 Quota: 850 Turnout: 5,159 (81.71%)

=== Drum Manor ===
1985: 1 x Sinn Féin, 1 x DUP, 1 x UUP, 1 x SDLP, 1 x Independent Unionist

Drum Manor - 5 seats
Party	Candidate	FPv%	Count				
Party	Candidate	FPv%	1	2	3	4	5
DUP	Walter Millar	21.78%	1,120				
UUP	Samuel Glasgow*	20.26%	1,042				
SDLP	James McGarvey	17.66%	908				
Ind. Unionist	Samuel Parke*	9.47%	487	746.92	929.26		
Sinn Féin	Tony O'Driscoll	15.63%	804	804.48	804.66	808.26	830.94
Sinn Féin	Sean Begley	15.21%	782	782.72	782.72	787.76	812.42
Electorate: 6,017 Valid: 5,143 (85.47%) Spoilt: 105 Quota: 858 Turnout: 5,248 (87.22%)
