= 2011 Cookstown District Council election =

Local govt election in Northern Ireland

← 2005	5 May 2011	2014 →

All 16 seats to Cookstown District Council 9 seats needed for a majority
	First party	Second party	Third party
Party	Sinn Féin	SDLP	DUP
Seats won	6	4	3
Seat change	▲1	▼1	0
	Fourth party
Party	UUP
Seats won	3
Seat change	0
- Party with the most votes by district.

Elections to Cookstown District Council were held on 5 May 2011 on the same day as the other Northern Irish local government elections. The election used three district electoral areas to elect a total of 16 councillors.

== Election results ==
Cookstown District Council Election Result 2011
Party	Seats	Gains	Losses	Net gain/loss	Seats %	Votes %	Votes	+/−
Sinn Féin	6	1	0	▲1	37.5	39.1	6,135	▲5.6
SDLP	4	0	1	▼1	25.0	18.0	2,829	▲0.7
DUP	3	0	0	0	18.8	18.1	2,834	▼4.4
UUP	3	0	0	0	12.5	16.9	2,650	▼2.6
TUV	0	0	0	0	0.0	7.4	1,159	New
Alliance	0	0	0	0	0.0	0.6	92	▲0.6

Note: "Votes" are the first preference votes.

== Districts summary ==
Results of the Cookstown District Council election, 2011 by district
Ward	%	Cllrs	%	Cllrs	%	Cllrs	%	Cllrs	%	Cllrs	Total Cllrs
Ward	Sinn Féin		SDLP		DUP		UUP		Others		Total Cllrs
Ballinderry	39.3	2	22.2	2	19.3	1	12.1	1	7.1	0	6
Cookstown Central	32.4	2	19.9	1	17.6	1	21.7	1	8.4	0	5
Drum Manor	44.3	2	11.2	1	16.8	1	19.0	1	8.7	0	5
Total	39.1	6	18.0	4	18.1	3	16.9	3	7.9	0	16

== District results ==
=== Ballinderry ===
2005: 2 x Sinn Féin, 2 x SDLP, 1 x DUP, 1 x UUP
2011: 2 x Sinn Féin, 2 x SDLP, 1 x DUP, 1 x UUP
2005-2011 Change: No change

Ballinderry - 6 seats
Party	Candidate	FPv%	Count			
Party	Candidate	FPv%	1	2	3	4
Sinn Féin	Patrick McAleer*	26.57%	1,713			
DUP	Samuel McCartney*	19.32%	1,246			
Sinn Féin	Michael McIvor*	12.72%	820	1,451.2		
SDLP	Deirdre Mayo	12.02%	775	875.32	1,026.52	
UUP	Robert Kelly	12.08%	779	783.32	785.72	992.81
SDLP	Christine McFlynn	10.14%	654	706.8	857.52	863.19
TUV	Walter Millar	7.15%	461	461.48	462.44	563.42
Electorate: 9,986 Valid: 6,448 (64.57%) Spoilt: 140 Quota: 922 Turnout: 6,588 (65.97%)

=== Cookstown Central ===
2005: 2 x SDLP, 1 x Sinn Féin, 1 x UUP, 1 x DUP
2011: 2 x Sinn Féin, 1 x SDLP, 1 x UUP, 1 x DUP
2005-2011 Change: Sinn Féin gain from SDLP

Cookstown Central - 5 seats
Party	Candidate	FPv%	Count				
Party	Candidate	FPv%	1	2	3	4	5
Sinn Féin	John McNamee*	23.55%	986				
UUP	Trevor Wilson*	21.72%	909				
DUP	Ian McCrea*	17.63%	738				
SDLP	Tony Quinn*	14.88%	623	665.63	691.38	892.38	
Sinn Féin	Ciarán McElhone	8.89%	372	600.23	600.48	657	730
TUV	Hannah Loughrin	6.07%	254	254.29	402.04	431.83	439.83
SDLP	Peter Cassidy*	5.06%	212	217.22	231.97		
Alliance	Michael McDonald	2.20%	92	95.77	111.52		
Electorate: 7,556 Valid: 4,186 (55.40%) Spoilt: 68 Quota: 698 Turnout: 4,254 (56.30%)

=== Drum Manor ===
2005: 2 x Sinn Féin, 1 x UUP, 1 x DUP, 1 x SDLP
2011: 2 x Sinn Féin, 1 x UUP, 1 x DUP, 1 x SDLP
2005-2011 Change: No change

Drum Manor - 5 seats
Party	Candidate	FPv%	Count			
Party	Candidate	FPv%	1	2	3	4
Sinn Féin	Sean Clarke*	19.15%	970			
UUP	Samuel Glasgow*	18.99%	962			
DUP	Maureen Lees*	16.78%	850			
Sinn Féin	Cathal Mallaghan	14.59%	739	838.19	839.75	840.88
SDLP	James McGarvey*	11.15%	565	573.32	586.84	770.78
Sinn Féin	Oliver Molloy*	10.56%	535	551.25	551.25	552.64
TUV	Samuel Parke	8.77%	444	444.39	542.28	
Electorate: 7,406 Valid: 5,065 (68.39%) Spoilt: 96 Quota: 845 Turnout: 5,161 (69.69%)
