= 2005 Cookstown District Council election =

Local govt election in Northern Ireland

← 2001	5 May 2005	2011 →

All 16 seats to Cookstown District Council 9 seats needed for a majority
	First party	Second party	Third party
Party	Sinn Féin	SDLP	DUP
Seats won	5	5	3
Seat change	▼1	▲1	0
	Fourth party	Fifth party
Party	UUP	Independent
Seats won	3	0
Seat change	▲1	▼1
- Party with the most votes by district.

Elections to Cookstown District Council were held on 5 May 2005 on the same day as the other Northern Irish local government elections. The election used three district electoral areas to elect a total of 16 councillors.

== Election results ==
Cookstown District Council Election Result 2005
Party	Seats	Gains	Losses	Net gain/loss	Seats %	Votes %	Votes	+/−
Sinn Féin	5	0	1	▼1	31.3	33.5	3,342	▲0.3
SDLP	5	1	0	▲1	31.3	17.3	1,730	▼6.3
DUP	3	1	0	▲1	18.8	22.5	2,243	▲4.1
UUP	3	0	0	0	18.8	19.5	1,951	▼1.6
Independent	0	0	1	▼1	0.0	6.4	641	▲2.7
Socialist Party	0	0	0	0	0.0	0.8	84	New

Note: "Votes" are the first preference votes.

== Districts summary ==
Results of the Cookstown District Council election, 2005 by district
Ward	%	Cllrs	%	Cllrs	%	Cllrs	%	Cllrs	%	Cllrs	Total Cllrs
Ward	Sinn Féin		SDLP		DUP		UUP		Others		Total Cllrs
Ballinderry	N/A	2	N/A	2	N/A	1	N/A	1	N/A	0	6
Cookstown Central	27.9	1	21.1	2	26.1	1	23.2	1	1.7	0	5
Drum Manor	38.5	2	13.9	1	19.1	1	16.1	1	12.4	0	5
Total	33.5	5	17.3	5	22.5	3	19.5	3	7.2	0	16

== District results ==
=== Ballinderry ===
2001: 2 x Sinn Féin, 2 x SDLP, 1 x DUP, 1 x UUP
2005: 2 x Sinn Féin, 2 x SDLP, 1 x DUP, 1 x UUP
2001-2005 Change: No change

Ballinderry - 6 seats
Party	Candidate	FPv%	Count
Party	Candidate	FPv%	1
SDLP	Mary Baker*	N/A	N/A
UUP	Thomas Greer*	N/A	N/A
Sinn Féin	Patrick McAleer*	N/A	N/A
DUP	Samuel McCartney	N/A	N/A
SDLP	Patsy McGlone*	N/A	N/A
Sinn Féin	Michael McIvor*	N/A	N/A
Electorate: N/A Valid: N/A Spoilt: N/A Quota: N/A Turnout: N/A

- As only six candidates had been nominated for six seats, there was no vote in Ballinderry and all six candidates were deemed elected.

=== Cookstown Central ===
2001: 2 x Sinn Féin, 1 x SDLP, 1 x DUP, 1 x UUP
2005: 2 x SDLP, 1 x Sinn Féin, 1 x DUP, 1 x UUP
2001-2005 Change: SDLP gain from Sinn Féin

Cookstown Central - 5 seats
Party	Candidate	FPv%	Count				
Party	Candidate	FPv%	1	2	3	4	5
DUP	Ian McCrea*	26.06%	1,246				
UUP	Trevor Wilson*	23.21%	1,110				
Sinn Féin	John McNamee*	20.43%	977				
SDLP	Peter Cassidy*	10.75%	514	659.92	796	807.34	
SDLP	Tony Quinn	10.31%	493	571.08	659.28	675.12	807.68
Sinn Féin	Ciarán McElhone	7.49%	358	359.92	361.18	503.92	522.84
Socialist Party	Harry Hutchinson	1.76%	84	302.24	387.32		
Electorate: 7,452 Valid: 4,782 (64.17%) Spoilt: 72 Quota: 798 Turnout: 4,854 (65.14%)

=== Drum Manor ===
2001: 2 x Sinn Féin, 1 x UUP, 1 x SDLP, 1 x Independent
2005: 2 x Sinn Féin, 1 x UUP, 1 x SDLP, 1 x DUP
2001-2005 Change: DUP gain from Independent

Drum Manor - 5 seats
Party	Candidate	FPv%	Count		
Party	Candidate	FPv%	1	2	3
Sinn Féin	Sean Clarke	20.25%	1,055		
DUP	Maureen Lees	19.14%	997		
Sinn Féin	Oliver Molloy*	18.28%	952		
SDLP	James McGarvey*	13.88%	723	895.8	
UUP	Samuel Glasgow*	16.15%	841	850	920.46
Independent	Samuel Parke*	12.31%	641	642.08	694.08
Electorate: 6,814 Valid: 5,209 (76.45%) Spoilt: 59 Quota: 869 Turnout: 5,268 (77.31%)
