= 2001 Cookstown District Council election =

Local govt election in Northern Ireland

← 1997	7 June 2001	2005 →

All 16 seats to Cookstown District Council 9 seats needed for a majority
	First party	Second party	Third party
Party	Sinn Féin	SDLP	UUP
Seats won	6	4	3
Seat change	▲1	0	▼1
	Fourth party	Fifth party	Sixth party
Party	DUP	Independent	Ind. Unionist
Seats won	2	1	0
Seat change	0	▲1	▼1
- Party with the most votes by district.

Elections to Cookstown District Council were held on 7 June 2001 on the same day as the other Northern Irish local government elections. The election used three district electoral areas to elect a total of 16 councillors.

== Election results ==
Cookstown District Council Election Result 2001
Party	Seats	Gains	Losses	Net gain/loss	Seats %	Votes %	Votes	+/−
Sinn Féin	6	1	0	▲1	37.5	33.2	6,216	▲5.2
SDLP	4	0	0	0	25.0	23.6	4,416	▼1.8
UUP	3	0	1	▼1	18.8	21.1	3,959	▼2.6
DUP	2	0	0	0	12.5	18.4	3,446	0.0
Independent	1	0	0	▲1	0.0	3.7	689	▲3.7

Note: "Votes" are the first preference votes.

== Districts summary ==
Results of the Cookstown District Council election, 2001 by district
Ward	%	Cllrs	%	Cllrs	%	Cllrs	%	Cllrs	%	Cllrs	Total Cllrs
Ward	Sinn Féin		SDLP		UUP		DUP		Others		Total Cllrs
Ballinderry	30.0	2	32.5	2	17.2	1	20.3	1	0.0	0	6
Cookstown Central	31.7	2	19.8	1	27.6	1	20.9	1	0.0	0	5
Drum Manor	39.0	2	15.6	1	19.8	1	13.4	0	12.2	1	5
Total	33.2	6	23.6	4	21.1	3	18.4	2	3.7	1	16

== District results ==
=== Ballinderry ===
1997: 2 x SDLP, 2 x Sinn Féin, 1 x DUP, 1 x UUP
2001: 2 x SDLP, 2 x Sinn Féin, 1 x DUP, 1 x UUP
1997-2001 Change: No change

Ballinderry - 6 seats
Party	Candidate	FPv%	Count				
Party	Candidate	FPv%	1	2	3	4	5
SDLP	Patsy McGlone*	23.86%	1,771				
Sinn Féin	Patrick McAleer*	21.12%	1,567				
SDLP	Mary Baker*	8.64%	641	1,187.92			
Sinn Féin	Michael McIvor	8.84%	656	805.6	1,300.85		
UUP	Thomas Greer*	12.75%	946	949.08	949.43	963.08	1,220.08
DUP	Anne McCrea*	13.06%	969	970.76	972.16	973.21	1,015.79
DUP	Samuel McCartney	7.24%	537	537.88	538.93	540.33	566.26
UUP	James McCollum	4.50%	334	337.52	337.87	341.02	
Electorate: 8,938 Valid: 7,421 (83.03%) Spoilt: 155 Quota: 1,061 Turnout: 7,576 (84.76%)

=== Cookstown Central ===
1997: 2 x UUP, 1 x Sinn Féin, 1 x SDLP, 1 x DUP
2001: 2 x Sinn Féin, 1 x UUP, 1 x SDLP, 1 x DUP
1997-2001 Change: Sinn Féin gain from UUP

Cookstown Central - 5 seats
Party	Candidate	FPv%	Count					
Party	Candidate	FPv%	1	2	3	4	5	6
Sinn Féin	John McNamee*	25.23%	1,427					
UUP	Trevor Wilson*	23.39%	1,323					
DUP	Ian McCrea	18.81%	1,064					
SDLP	Peter Cassidy	14.00%	792	828.4	835.36	838.1	1,118.1	
Sinn Féin	Seamus Campbell	6.44%	364	796.6	796.89	797.89	832.63	956.63
UUP	Albert Crawford	4.21%	238	238	547.72	672.03	687.67	
SDLP	Eddie Espie	5.80%	328	340.95	347.62	351.78		
DUP	Hugh Davidson	2.12%	120	120	174.81			
Electorate: 7,503 Valid: 5,656 (75.38%) Spoilt: 118 Quota: 943 Turnout: 5,774 (76.96%)

=== Drum Manor ===
1997: 2 x Sinn Féin, 1 x UUP, 1 x SDLP, 1 x Independent Unionist
2001: 2 x Sinn Féin, 1 x UUP, 1 x SDLP, 1 x Independent
1997-2001 Change: Independent Unionist becomes Independent

Drum Manor - 5 seats
Party	Candidate	FPv%	Count				
Party	Candidate	FPv%	1	2	3	4	5
Sinn Féin	Desmond Grimes	21.83%	1,233				
UUP	Samuel Glasgow*	19.79%	1,118				
Sinn Féin	Oliver Molloy	17.15%	969				
SDLP	James McGarvey*	15.65%	884	1,170.2			
Independent	Samuel Parke*	12.20%	689	692	723.2	827.04	845.04
DUP	Maureen Lees	13.38%	756	757.8	765.6	829.6	838.6
Electorate: 6,624 Valid: 5,649 (85.28%) Spoilt: 87 Quota: 942 Turnout: 5,736 (86.59%)
