= Ballinderry (District Electoral Area) =

District electoral areas in Cookstown, Northern Ireland

Ballinderry DEA (1993-2014) within Cookstown

Ballinderry was one of the three district electoral areas in Cookstown, Northern Ireland which existed from 1985 to 2014. The district elected six members to Cookstown District Council, and formed part of the Mid Ulster constituencies for the Northern Ireland Assembly and UK Parliament.

It was created for the 1985 local elections, replacing Cookstown Area B which had existed since 1973, and contained the wards of Ardboe, Coagh, Killycolpy, Moneymore, Stewartstown and The Loop. It was abolished for the 2014 local elections and divided between the Cookstown DEA and the Magherafelt DEA.

== Councillors ==
Election	Councillor (party)	Councillor (party)	Councillor (party)	Councillor (party)	Councillor (party)	Councillor (party)
2011	Patrick McAleer (Sinn Féin)	Michael McIvor (Sinn Féin)	Deirdre Mayo (SDLP)	Christine McFlynn (SDLP)	Robert Kelly (UUP)	Samuel McCartney (DUP)
2005	Patrick McAleer (Sinn Féin)	Michael McIvor (Sinn Féin)	Patsy McGlone (SDLP)	Mary Baker (SDLP)	Thomas Greer (UUP)	Samuel McCartney (DUP)
2001	Patrick McAleer (Sinn Féin)	Michael McIvor (Sinn Féin)	Patsy McGlone (SDLP)	Mary Baker (SDLP)	Thomas Greer (UUP)	Anne McCrea (DUP)
1997	Patrick McAleer (Sinn Féin)	Seamus Campbell (Sinn Féin)	Patsy McGlone (SDLP)	Mary Baker (SDLP)	Thomas Greer (UUP)	Anne McCrea (DUP)
1993	Victor McGahie (UUP)	Seamus Campbell (Sinn Féin)	Patsy McGlone (SDLP)	Francis Rock (SDLP)	Thomas Greer (UUP)	Anne McCrea (DUP)
1989	Victor McGahie (UUP)	Francis McNally (Sinn Féin)	John O'Neill (SDLP)	Paddy Duffy (SDLP)	William McIntyre (DUP)	Samuel McCartney (DUP)
1985	Victor McGahie (UUP)	Francis McNally (Sinn Féin)	Patrick McAleer (Sinn Féin)	Paddy Duffy (SDLP)	William McIntyre (DUP)	Samuel McCartney (DUP)

== 2011 election ==
2005: 2 x Sinn Féin, 2 x SDLP, 1 x DUP, 1 x UUP

2011: 2 x Sinn Féin, 2 x SDLP, 1 x DUP, 1 x UUP

2005-2011 change: No change

Ballinderry - 6 seats
Party	Candidate	FPv%	Count			
Party	Candidate	FPv%	1	2	3	4
Sinn Féin	Patrick McAleer*	26.57%	1,713			
DUP	Samuel McCartney*	19.32%	1,246			
Sinn Féin	Michael McIvor*	12.72%	820	1,451.2		
SDLP	Deirdre Mayo	12.02%	775	875.32	1,026.52	
UUP	Robert Kelly	12.08%	779	783.32	785.72	992.81
SDLP	Christine McFlynn	10.14%	654	706.8	857.52	863.19
TUV	Walter Millar	7.15%	461	461.48	462.44	563.42
Electorate: 9,986 Valid: 6,448 (64.57%) Spoilt: 140 Quota: 922 Turnout: 6,588 (65.97%)

== 2005 election ==
2001: 2 x Sinn Féin, 2 x SDLP, 1 x DUP, 1 x UUP

2005: 2 x Sinn Féin, 2 x SDLP, 1 x DUP, 1 x UUP

2001-2005 change: No change

Ballinderry - 6 seats
Party	Candidate	FPv%	Count
Party	Candidate	FPv%	1
SDLP	Mary Baker*	N/A	N/A
UUP	Thomas Greer*	N/A	N/A
Sinn Féin	Patrick McAleer*	N/A	N/A
DUP	Samuel McCartney	N/A	N/A
SDLP	Patsy McGlone*	N/A	N/A
Sinn Féin	Michael McIvor*	N/A	N/A
Electorate: N/A Valid: N/A Spoilt: N/A Quota: N/A Turnout: N/A

- As only six candidates had been nominated for six seats, there was no vote in Ballinderry and all six candidates were deemed elected.

== 2001 election ==
1997: 2 x SDLP, 2 x Sinn Féin, 1 x DUP, 1 x UUP

2001: 2 x SDLP, 2 x Sinn Féin, 1 x DUP, 1 x UUP

1997-2001 change: No change

Ballinderry - 6 seats
Party	Candidate	FPv%	Count				
Party	Candidate	FPv%	1	2	3	4	5
SDLP	Patsy McGlone*	23.86%	1,771				
Sinn Féin	Patrick McAleer*	21.12%	1,567				
SDLP	Mary Baker*	8.64%	641	1,187.92			
Sinn Féin	Michael McIvor	8.84%	656	805.6	1,300.85		
UUP	Thomas Greer*	12.75%	946	949.08	949.43	963.08	1,220.08
DUP	Anne McCrea*	13.06%	969	970.76	972.16	973.21	1,015.79
DUP	Samuel McCartney	7.24%	537	537.88	538.93	540.33	566.26
UUP	James McCollum	4.50%	334	337.52	337.87	341.02	
Electorate: 8,938 Valid: 7,421 (83.03%) Spoilt: 155 Quota: 1,061 Turnout: 7,576 (84.76%)

== 1997 election ==
1993: 2 x SDLP, 2 x UUP, 1 x Sinn Féin, 1 x DUP

1997: 2 x SDLP, 2 x Sinn Féin, 1 x UUP, 1 x DUP

1993-1997 change: Sinn Féin gain from UUP

Ballinderry - 6 seats
Party	Candidate	FPv%	Count							
Party	Candidate	FPv%	1	2	3	4	5	6	7	8
SDLP	Patsy McGlone*	22.32%	1,555							
Sinn Féin	Patrick McAleer	21.79%	1,518							
Sinn Féin	Seamus Campbell	7.13%	497	580.98	1,061.58					
DUP	Anne McCrea*	14.01%	976	977.9	978.62	982.12	1,451.12			
SDLP	Mary Baker	7.13%	497	912.72	935.76	983.68	985.06	986.06	1,048.08	
UUP	Thomas Greer*	8.87%	618	619.52	620.24	624.24	664.6	940.6	940.88	941.72
UUP	William Armstrong	10.55%	735	736.9	736.9	736.9	745.66	890.66	890.66	892.62
DUP	Samuel McCartney	7.45%	519	520.52	521.24	522.24				
Ind. Nationalist	Francis Rocks*	0.76%	53	93.66	103.02					
Electorate: 8,536 Valid: 6,968 (81.63%) Spoilt: 125 Quota: 996 Turnout: 7,093 (83.10%)

== 1993 election ==
1989: 2 x SDLP, 2 x DUP, 1 x DUP, 1 x Sinn Féin

1993: 2 x SDLP, 2 x UUP, 1 x DUP, 1 x Sinn Féin

1989-1993 change: UUP gain from DUP

Ballinderry - 6 seats
Party	Candidate	FPv%	Count				
Party	Candidate	FPv%	1	2	3	4	5
SDLP	Patsy McGlone	20.05%	1,314				
Sinn Féin	Seamus Campbell	18.90%	1,239				
SDLP	Francis Rocks	12.94%	848	1,205.6			
DUP	Anne McCrea	14.28%	936	936.6	936.87	940.47	
UUP	Thomas Greer	10.47%	686	686.3	687.11	690.11	980.11
UUP	Victor McGahie*	10.51%	689	690.5	692.12	701.12	926.42
Sinn Féin	Noel Quinn	4.50%	295	310.3	602.98	702.58	702.58
DUP	Samuel McCartney*	8.35%	547	547.3	548.11	549.61	
Electorate: 8,151 Valid: 6,554 (80.41%) Spoilt: 211 Quota: 937 Turnout: 6,765 (83.00%)

== 1989 election ==
1985: 2 x DUP, 2 x Sinn Féin, 1 x SDLP, 1 x UUP

1989: 2 x DUP, 2 x SDLP, 1 x Sinn Féin, 1 x UUP

1985-1989 change: SDLP gain from Sinn Féin

Ballinderry - 6 seats
Party	Candidate	FPv%	Count					
Party	Candidate	FPv%	1	2	3	4	5	6
SDLP	Paddy Duffy*	22.40%	1,370					
DUP	William McIntyre*	16.99%	1,039					
Sinn Féin	Francis McNally*	14.19%	868	920.54				
UUP	Victor McGahie*	12.77%	781	782.11	811.66	1,208.66		
DUP	Samuel McCartney*	8.63%	528	528	648.6	764.54	1,088.84	
SDLP	John O'Neill	6.57%	402	810.11	810.41	811.41	819.87	889.43
Sinn Féin	Siobhan McQuillan	10.09%	617	636.61	636.76	637.5	637.5	637.5
UUP	Neville Forsythe	8.37%	512	514.59	518.79			
Electorate: 7,775 Valid: 6,117 (78.68%) Spoilt: 224 Quota: 874 Turnout: 6,341 (81.56%)

== 1985 election ==
1985: 2 x DUP, 2 x Sinn Féin, 1 x SDLP, 1 x UUP

Ballinderry - 6 seats
Party	Candidate	FPv%	Count						
Party	Candidate	FPv%	1	2	3	4	5	6	7
DUP	William McIntyre*	19.33%	1,215						
Sinn Féin	Patrick McAleer	16.57%	1,042						
SDLP	Paddy Duffy*	14.25%	896	897.56	901.56				
Sinn Féin	Francis McNally	12.76%	802	802.26	802.26	918.46			
UUP	Victor McGahie*	10.08%	634	671.44	684.44	685.14	685.14	1,111.14	
DUP	Samuel McCartney	7.13%	448	712.42	723.94	724.78	725.78	808.88	1,017.68
SDLP	Joseph Davidson*	6.52%	410	410.26	414.26	426.44	673.98	684.98	687.98
UUP	Andrew Booth	8.08%	508	517.36	528.14	528.14	531.14		
SDLP	John O'Neill	4.56%	287	287	288	292.9			
Independent	Eric Brown	0.72%	45	46.3					
Electorate: 7,587 Valid: 6,287 (82.87%) Spoilt: 149 Quota: 899 Turnout: 6,436 (84.83%)
