= Cookstown (District Electoral Area) =

District electoral area in Northern Ireland

- Mid Ulster District Council DEA constituency

Current constituency
- Created: 1985
- Seats: 5 (1985-2014); 7 (2014-)
- Councillors: Gavin Bell (SF); Wilbert Buchanan (DUP); Eva Cahoon (DUP); Kerri Martin (SDLP); John McNamee (SF); Donna Mullin (SF); Trevor Wilson (UUP)

Cookstown DEA within Mid Ulster

Cookstown Central DEA (1993-2014) within Cookstown

Cookstown is one of the seven district electoral areas (DEA) in Mid Ulster, Northern Ireland, encompassing the town of the same name and nearby villages. The district elects seven members to Mid Ulster District Council and contains the wards of Coagh, Cookstown East, Cookstown South, Cookstown West, Loughry, Oaklands and Pomeroy. Cookstown forms part of the Mid Ulster constituencies for the Northern Ireland Assembly and UK Parliament.

It was created for the 1985 local elections, replacing Cookstown Area C which had existed since 1973. It was called Cookstown Central until 2014, and originally contained five wards (Gortalowry, Killymoon, Newbuildings, Oldtown and Tullagh). Following local government reform, Cookstown gained most of the abolished Ballinderry DEA and Drum Manor DEA in the 2014 local elections.

== Councillors ==
Election	Councillor (Party)	Councillor (Party)	Councillor (Party)	Councillor (Party)	Councillor (Party)	Councillor (Party)	Councillor (Party)
July 2024 Co-Option	John McNamee (Sinn Féin)	Donna Mullin (Sinn Féin)	Kerri Martin (SDLP)	Trevor Wilson (UUP)	Wilbert Buchanan (DUP)	Eva Cahoon (DUP)	Gavin Bell (Sinn Féin)
2023	John McNamee (Sinn Féin)	Cathal Mallaghan (Sinn Féin)	Kerri Martin (SDLP)	Trevor Wilson (UUP)	Wilbert Buchanan (DUP)	Eva Cahoon (DUP)	Gavin Bell (Sinn Féin)
2019	John McNamee (Sinn Féin)	Cathal Mallaghan (Sinn Féin)	Kerri Martin (SDLP)	Trevor Wilson (UUP)	Wilbert Buchanan (DUP)	Mark Glasgow (UUP)	Gavin Bell (Sinn Féin)
May 2017 Defection	John McNamee (Sinn Féin)	Cathal Mallaghan (Sinn Féin)	Tony Quinn (SDLP)/ (Independent)	Trevor Wilson (UUP)	Wilbert Buchanan (DUP)	Mark Glasgow (UUP)	Gavin Bell (Sinn Féin)
2014	John McNamee (Sinn Féin)	Cathal Mallaghan (Sinn Féin)	Tony Quinn (SDLP)/ (Independent)	Trevor Wilson (UUP)	Wilbert Buchanan (DUP)	Mark Glasgow (UUP)	Gavin Bell (Sinn Féin)
2011	John McNamee (Sinn Féin)	Ciarán McElhone (Sinn Féin)	Tony Quinn (SDLP)/ (Independent)	Trevor Wilson (UUP)	Ian McCrea (DUP)	5 seats 1985–2014	5 seats 1985–2014
2005	John McNamee (Sinn Féin)	Peter Cassidy (SDLP)	Tony Quinn (SDLP)/ (Independent)	Trevor Wilson (UUP)	Ian McCrea (DUP)	5 seats 1985–2014	5 seats 1985–2014
2001	John McNamee (Sinn Féin)	Peter Cassidy (SDLP)	Seamus Campbell (Sinn Féin)	Trevor Wilson (UUP)	Ian McCrea (DUP)	5 seats 1985–2014	5 seats 1985–2014
1997	Sean Begley (Sinn Féin)	Denis Haughey (SDLP)	William Larmour (UUP)	Trevor Wilson (UUP)	William Larmour (DUP)	5 seats 1985–2014	5 seats 1985–2014
1993	Margaret Laverty (SDLP)	Denis Haughey (SDLP)	Ian Montgomery (UUP)	Trevor Wilson (UUP)	William Larmour (DUP)	5 seats 1985–2014	5 seats 1985–2014
1989	Margaret Laverty (SDLP)	Denis Haughey (SDLP)	Kenneth Loughrin (DUP)	Trevor Wilson (UUP)	Alan Kane (DUP)	5 seats 1985–2014	5 seats 1985–2014
1985	Christopher Neeson (Sinn Féin)	Brigid Neeson (SDLP)	Kenneth Loughrin (DUP)	Espie Donaldson (UUP)	Alan Kane (DUP)	5 seats 1985–2014	5 seats 1985–2014

== 2023 Election ==
2019: 3 x Sinn Féin, 2 x UUP, 1 x DUP, 1 x SDLP

2023: 3 x Sinn Féin, 2 x DUP, 1 x UUP, 1 x SDLP

2019–2023 Change: DUP gain from UUP

Cookstown - 7 seats
Party	Candidate	FPv%	Count								
Party	Candidate	FPv%	1	2	3	4	5	6	7	8	9
Sinn Féin	Cathal Mallaghan*	20.97%	2,157								
Sinn Féin	John McNamee*	17.21%	1,771								
Sinn Féin	Gavin Bell*	11.81%	1,215	2,010.20							
SDLP	Kerri Martin*	7.48%	769	813.80	1,013.00	1,381.48					
DUP	Wilbert Buchanan*	12.14%	1,249	1,249.80	1,249.80	1,250.74	1,252.74	1,252.74	1,360.74		
UUP	Trevor Wilson*	6.82%	702	702.40	702.40	708.04	708.04	712.64	983.27	1,002.87	1,201.33
DUP	Eva Cahoon	7.47%	768	768.00	768.00	769.41	769.41	769.41	843.41	886.81	919.54
TUV	Timothy Hagan	6.44%	663	663.00	663.80	667.56	669.56	670.02	707.02	716.12	740.19
Alliance	Chris Hillcox	4.12%	424	435.60	480.40	569.70	598.25	684.96	711.89	713.29	
UUP	Mark Glasgow*	5.11%	526	527.60	530.00	530.47	531.47	532.39			
Independent	Louise Taylor	0.43%	44	46.40	51.60	62.41					
Electorate: 17,175 Valid: 10,288 (59.90%) Spoilt: 145 Quota: 1,287 Turnout: 10,433 (60,75%)

== 2019 Election ==
2014: 3 x Sinn Féin, 2 x UUP, 1 x DUP, 1 x SDLP

2019: 3 x Sinn Féin, 2 x UUP, 1 x DUP, 1 x SDLP

2014–2019 Change: No change

Cookstown – 7 seats
Party	Candidate	FPv%	Count					
Party	Candidate	FPv%	1	2	3	4	5	6
Sinn Féin	Cathal Mallaghan*	18.50%	1,710					
Sinn Féin	John McNamee*	14.81%	1,369					
SDLP	Kerri Hughes	14.49%	1,339					
DUP	Wilbert Buchanan*	13.26%	1,225					
Sinn Féin	Gavin Bell*	9.09%	840	1,385.7				
UUP	Trevor Wilson*	11.27%	1,041	1,042.02	1,047.46	1,103.46	1,163.46	
UUP	Mark Glasgow*	8.58%	793	795.04	804.9	821.9	904.6	1,063.43
DUP	Grace Neville	7.51%	694	695.36	696.72	707.72	796.74	819.65
TUV	Alan Day	2.49%	230	230.34	237.48	249.48		
Electorate: 16,472 Valid: 9,241 (56.10%) Spoilt: 153 Quota: 1,156 Turnout: 9,394 (57.03%)

== 2014 Election ==
2011: 2 x Sinn Féin, 1 x SDLP, 1 x UUP, 1 x DUP

2014: 3 x Sinn Féin, 2 x UUP, 1 x DUP, 1 x SDLP

2011-2014 Change: Sinn Féin and UUP gain due to the addition of two seats

Cookstown - 7 seats
Party	Candidate	FPv%	Count								
Party	Candidate	FPv%	1	2	3	4	5	6	7	8	9
Sinn Féin	Cathal Mallaghan*	16.41%	1,481								
UUP	Trevor Wilson*	14.61%	1,319								
Sinn Féin	John McNamee*	13.89%	1,254								
Sinn Féin	Gavin Bell	11.03%	996	1,307.76							
SDLP	Tony Quinn* ‡	8.90%	803	823.88	830.32	860.56	956.51	1,007.18	1,015.32	1,240.32	
DUP	Wilbert Buchanan*	7.94%	717	717.24	734.6	734.84	735.41	739.55	774.83	776.16	1,090.97
UUP	Mark Glasgow*	9.05%	817	817.72	919.36	919.6	919.98	931.54	980.52	986.95	1,032.88
TUV	Walter Millar	7.05%	636	636.24	670.96	671.2	672.91	676.29	733.85	738.52	813.9
DUP	Maureen Lees*	4.60%	415	415	433.2	433.44	433.44	435.82	465.24	468.43	
SDLP	Maria Cleary-McGuffin	3.06%	276	283.92	284.34	307.38	322.77	342.96	349.86		
UKIP	Alan Day	2.16%	195	195	197.52	198	199.9	205.04			
Alliance	Mickey McDonald	1.30%	117	119.16	120.42	123.06	128.57				
Electorate: 16,135 Valid: 9,026 (55.94%) Spoilt: 141 Quota: 1,129 Turnout: 9,167 (56.81%)

== 2011 Election ==
2005: 2 x SDLP, 1 x Sinn Féin, 1 x UUP, 1 x DUP

2011: 2 x Sinn Féin, 1 x SDLP, 1 x UUP, 1 x DUP

2005-2011 Change: Sinn Féin gain from SDLP

Cookstown Central - 5 seats
Party	Candidate	FPv%	Count				
Party	Candidate	FPv%	1	2	3	4	5
Sinn Féin	John McNamee*	23.55%	986				
UUP	Trevor Wilson*	21.72%	909				
DUP	Ian McCrea*	17.63%	738				
SDLP	Tony Quinn*	14.88%	623	665.63	691.38	892.38	
Sinn Féin	Ciarán McElhone	8.89%	372	600.23	600.48	657	730
TUV	Hannah Loughrin	6.07%	254	254.29	402.04	431.83	439.83
SDLP	Peter Cassidy*	5.06%	212	217.22	231.97		
Alliance	Michael McDonald	2.20%	92	95.77	111.52		
Electorate: 7,556 Valid: 4,186 (55.40%) Spoilt: 68 Quota: 698 Turnout: 4,254 (56.30%)

== 2005 Election ==
2001: 2 x Sinn Féin, 1 x SDLP, 1 x DUP, 1 x UUP

2005: 2 x SDLP, 1 x Sinn Féin, 1 x DUP, 1 x UUP

2001-2005 Change: SDLP gain from Sinn Féin

Cookstown Central - 5 seats
Party	Candidate	FPv%	Count				
Party	Candidate	FPv%	1	2	3	4	5
DUP	Ian McCrea*	26.06%	1,246				
UUP	Trevor Wilson*	23.21%	1,110				
Sinn Féin	John McNamee*	20.43%	977				
SDLP	Peter Cassidy*	10.75%	514	659.92	796	807.34	
SDLP	Tony Quinn	10.31%	493	571.08	659.28	675.12	807.68
Sinn Féin	Ciarán McElhone	7.49%	358	359.92	361.18	503.92	522.84
Socialist Party	Harry Hutchinson	1.76%	84	302.24	387.32		
Electorate: 7,452 Valid: 4,782 (64.17%) Spoilt: 72 Quota: 798 Turnout: 4,854 (65.14%)

== 2001 Election ==
1997: 2 x UUP, 1 x Sinn Féin, 1 x SDLP, 1 x DUP

2001: 2 x Sinn Féin, 1 x UUP, 1 x SDLP, 1 x DUP

1997-2001 Change: Sinn Féin gain from UUP

Cookstown Central - 5 seats
Party	Candidate	FPv%	Count					
Party	Candidate	FPv%	1	2	3	4	5	6
Sinn Féin	John McNamee*	25.23%	1,427					
UUP	Trevor Wilson*	23.39%	1,323					
DUP	Ian McCrea	18.81%	1,064					
SDLP	Peter Cassidy	14.00%	792	828.4	835.36	838.1	1,118.1	
Sinn Féin	Seamus Campbell	6.44%	364	796.6	796.89	797.89	832.63	956.63
UUP	Albert Crawford	4.21%	238	238	547.72	672.03	687.67	
SDLP	Eddie Espie	5.80%	328	340.95	347.62	351.78		
DUP	Hugh Davidson	2.12%	120	120	174.81			
Electorate: 7,503 Valid: 5,656 (75.38%) Spoilt: 118 Quota: 943 Turnout: 5,774 (76.96%)

== 1997 Election ==
1993: 2 x UUP, 2 x SDLP, 1 x DUP

1997: 2 x UUP, 1 x SDLP, 1 x DUP, 1 x Sinn Féin

1993-1997 Change: Sinn Féin gain from SDLP

Cookstown Central - 5 seats
Party	Candidate	FPv%	Count					
Party	Candidate	FPv%	1	2	3	4	5	6
UUP	Trevor Wilson*	27.37%	1,427					
Sinn Féin	Sean Begley*	22.48%	1,172					
DUP	William John Larmour*	16.55%	863	996.77				
SDLP	Denis Haughey*	16.40%	855	859.68	1,090.48			
UUP	William Joseph Larmour	4.24%	221	581.36	581.76	581.76	745.42	855.01
SDLP	Margaret Laverty*	9.34%	487	489.34	558.54	741.34	746.52	748.86
DUP	Raymond McGarvey	3.62%	189	237.36	238.96	241.76		
Electorate: 7,474 Valid: 5,214 (69.76%) Spoilt: 94 Quota: 870 Turnout: 5,308 (71.02%)

== 1993 Election ==
1989: 2 x SDLP, 2 x DUP, 1 x UUP

1993: 2 x SDLP, 2 x UUP, 1 x DUP

1989-1993 Change: UUP gain from DUP

Cookstown Central - 5 seats
Party	Candidate	FPv%	Count						
Party	Candidate	FPv%	1	2	3	4	5	6	7
UUP	Trevor Wilson*	29.70%	1,514						
SDLP	Denis Haughey*	18.42%	939						
UUP	Ian Montgomery	7.94%	405	949.28					
DUP	William Larmour	12.44%	634	712.76	767	783.84	784.11	953.11	
SDLP	Margaret Laverty*	12.46%	635	635.44	637.36	672.68	748.19	758.59	779.59
Sinn Féin	Martin Conlon	13.81%	704	704	704.08	716.08	720.67	720.76	720.76
DUP	Rodney Mitchell	3.37%	172	201.48	231.16	239.84	240.02		
Democratic Left	Edwin Espie	1.00%	51	54.08	55.68				
Independent Labour	Harry Hutchinson	0.86%	44	44.44	45.56				
Electorate: 7,047 Valid: 5,098 (72.34%) Spoilt: 112 Quota: 850 Turnout: 5,210 (73.93%)

== 1989 Election ==
1985: 2 x DUP, 1 x SDLP, 1 x UUP, 1 x Sinn Féin

1989: 2 x DUP, 2 x SDLP, 1 x UUP

1985-1989 Change: SDLP gain from Sinn Féin

Cookstown Central - 5 seats
Party	Candidate	FPv%	Count					
Party	Candidate	FPv%	1	2	3	4	5	6
UUP	Trevor Wilson	27.60%	1,337					
DUP	Alan Kane*	27.35%	1,325					
SDLP	Denis Haughey*	17.65%	855					
DUP	Kenneth Loughrin*	2.19%	106	609.89	1,116.89			
SDLP	Margaret Laverty	8.67%	420	425.33	428.45	456.14	589.57	628.67
Sinn Féin	Dermot Coyle	11.35%	550	550	550.39	551.17	618.9	620.65
Workers' Party	Hugh Brennan	5.20%	252	262.66	263.83	317.26		
Electorate: 6,722 Valid: 4,845 (72.08%) Spoilt: 90 Quota: 808 Turnout: 4,935 (73.42%)

== 1985 Election ==
1985: 2 x DUP, 1 x UUP, 1 x SDLP, 1 x Sinn Féin

Cookstown Central - 5 seats
Party	Candidate	FPv%	Count					
Party	Candidate	FPv%	1	2	3	4	5	6
DUP	Alan Kane*	28.33%	1,444					
UUP	Espie Donaldson*	21.35%	1,088					
SDLP	Brigid Neeson*	11.10%	566	566	566.44	937.44		
DUP	Kenneth Loughrin*	3.49%	178	721.66	789.86	790.08	790.08	947.08
Sinn Féin	Christopher Neeson	15.62%	796	796	796	809	829.48	830.52
Workers' Party	Patrick Bloomer	8.00%	408	410.87	413.29	424.92	484.76	539.33
UUP	Edmund Giboney	4.32%	220	257.31	421.65	425.55	430.03	
SDLP	Margaret Laverty*	7.79%	397	399.87	400.97			
Electorate: 6,314 Valid: 5,097 (80.73%) Spoilt: 62 Quota: 850 Turnout: 5,159 (81.71%)
