= Drum Manor (District Electoral Area) =

District electoral areas in Cookstown, Northern Ireland

Drum Manor DEA (1993-2014) within Cookstown

Drum Manor was one of the three district electoral areas in Cookstown, Northern Ireland which existed from 1985 to 2014. The district elected five members to Cookstown District Council, and formed part of the Mid Ulster constituencies for the Northern Ireland Assembly and UK Parliament.

It was created for the 1985 local elections, replacing Cookstown Area A which had existed since 1973, and contained the wards of Dunnamore, Lissan, Oaklands, Pomeroy and Sandholes. It was abolished for the 2014 local elections and largely moved into the Cookstown DEA.

== Councillors ==
Election	Councillor (Party)	Councillor (Party)	Councillor (Party)	Councillor (Party)	Councillor (Party)
2011	Sean Clarke (Sinn Féin)	Cathal Mallaghan (Sinn Féin)	James McGarvey (SDLP)	Samuel Glasgow (UUP)	Maureen Lees (DUP)
2005	Sean Clarke (Sinn Féin)	Oliver Molloy (Sinn Féin)	James McGarvey (SDLP)	Samuel Glasgow (UUP)	Maureen Lees (DUP)
2001	Desmond Grimes (Sinn Féin)	Oliver Molloy (Sinn Féin)	James McGarvey (SDLP)	Samuel Glasgow (UUP)	Samuel Parkes (Independent Unionist)
1997	Finbar Conway (Sinn Féin)	John McNamee (Sinn Féin)	James McGarvey (SDLP)	Samuel Glasgow (UUP)	Samuel Parkes (Independent Unionist)
1993	William Cuddy (DUP)	Sean Begley (Sinn Féin)	James McGarvey (SDLP)	Samuel Glasgow (UUP)	Samuel Parkes (Independent Unionist)
1989	Walter Millar (DUP)	Sean Begley (Sinn Féin)	James McGarvey (SDLP)	Samuel Glasgow (UUP)	Samuel Parkes (Independent Unionist)
1985	Walter Millar (DUP)	Tony O'Driscoll (Sinn Féin)	James McGarvey (SDLP)	Samuel Glasgow (UUP)	Samuel Parkes (Independent Unionist)

== 2011 Election ==
2005: 2 x Sinn Féin, 1 x UUP, 1 x DUP, 1 x SDLP

2011: 2 x Sinn Féin, 1 x UUP, 1 x DUP, 1 x SDLP

2005-2011 Change: No change

Drum Manor - 5 seats
Party	Candidate	FPv%	Count			
Party	Candidate	FPv%	1	2	3	4
Sinn Féin	Sean Clarke*	19.15%	970			
UUP	Samuel Glasgow*	18.99%	962			
DUP	Maureen Lees*	16.78%	850			
Sinn Féin	Cathal Mallaghan	14.59%	739	838.19	839.75	840.88
SDLP	James McGarvey*	11.15%	565	573.32	586.84	770.78
Sinn Féin	Oliver Molloy*	10.56%	535	551.25	551.25	552.64
TUV	Samuel Parke	8.77%	444	444.39	542.28	
Electorate: 7,406 Valid: 5,065 (68.39%) Spoilt: 96 Quota: 845 Turnout: 5,161 (69.69%)

== 2005 Election ==
2001: 2 x Sinn Féin, 1 x UUP, 1 x SDLP, 1 x Independent

2005: 2 x Sinn Féin, 1 x UUP, 1 x SDLP, 1 x DUP

2001-2005 Change: DUP gain from Independent

Drum Manor - 5 seats
Party	Candidate	FPv%	Count		
Party	Candidate	FPv%	1	2	3
Sinn Féin	Sean Clarke	20.25%	1,055		
DUP	Maureen Lees	19.14%	997		
Sinn Féin	Oliver Molloy*	18.28%	952		
SDLP	James McGarvey*	13.88%	723	895.8	
UUP	Samuel Glasgow*	16.15%	841	850	920.46
Independent	Samuel Parke*	12.31%	641	642.08	694.08
Electorate: 6,814 Valid: 5,209 (76.45%) Spoilt: 59 Quota: 869 Turnout: 5,268 (77.31%)

== 2001 Election ==
1997: 2 x Sinn Féin, 1 x UUP, 1 x SDLP, 1 x Independent Unionist

2001: 2 x Sinn Féin, 1 x UUP, 1 x SDLP, 1 x Independent

1997-2001 Change: Independent Unionist becomes Independent

Drum Manor - 5 seats
Party	Candidate	FPv%	Count				
Party	Candidate	FPv%	1	2	3	4	5
Sinn Féin	Desmond Grimes	21.83%	1,233				
UUP	Samuel Glasgow*	19.79%	1,118				
Sinn Féin	Oliver Molloy	17.15%	969				
SDLP	James McGarvey*	15.65%	884	1,170.2			
Independent	Samuel Parke*	12.20%	689	692	723.2	827.04	845.04
DUP	Maureen Lees	13.38%	756	757.8	765.6	829.6	838.6
Electorate: 6,624 Valid: 5,649 (85.28%) Spoilt: 87 Quota: 942 Turnout: 5,736 (86.59%)

== 1997 Election ==
1993: 1 x Sinn Féin, 1 x UUP, 1 x SDLP, 1 x DUP, 1 x Independent Unionist

1997: 2 x Sinn Féin, 1 x UUP, 1 x SDLP, 1 x Independent Unionist

1993-1997 Change: Sinn Féin gain from DUP

Drum Manor - 5 seats
Party	Candidate	FPv%	Count				
Party	Candidate	FPv%	1	2	3	4	5
Sinn Féin	Finbar Conway	26.72%	1,446				
UUP	Samuel Glasgow*	21.68%	1,173				
SDLP	James McGarvey*	12.86%	696	717.28	1,025.28		
Ind. Unionist	Samuel Parke*	13.69%	741	741.38	745.38	910.29	
Sinn Féin	John McNamee	5.41%	293	774.08	820.84	820.84	941.84
DUP	William Cuddy*	12.68%	686	686	691.14	790.04	791.04
SDLP	Peter Cassidy	6.95%	376	405.64			
Electorate: 6,595 Valid: 5,411 (82.05%) Spoilt: 88 Quota: 902 Turnout: 5,499 (83.38%)

== 1993 Election ==
1989: 1 x Sinn Féin, 1 x UUP, 1 x SDLP, 1 x DUP, 1 x Independent Unionist

1993: 1 x Sinn Féin, 1 x UUP, 1 x SDLP, 1 x DUP, 1 x Independent Unionist

1989-1993 Change: No change

Drum Manor - 5 seats
Party	Candidate	FPv%	Count				
Party	Candidate	FPv%	1	2	3	4	5
UUP	Samuel Glasgow*	22.44%	1,183				
Sinn Féin	Sean Begley*	20.35%	1,073				
Ind. Unionist	Samuel Parke*	15.52%	818	1,037.7			
DUP	William Cuddy	12.61%	665	739.62	739.62	884.97	
SDLP	James McGarvey*	15.91%	839	846.28	853.3	859	906.8
SDLP	Sean Mallon	9.65%	509	510.04	515.26	515.64	602.78
Sinn Féin	Finbar Conway	3.51%	185	185.52	360.12	360.12	
Electorate: 6,335 Valid: 5,272 (83.22%) Spoilt: 147 Quota: 879 Turnout: 5,419 (85.54%)

== 1989 Election ==
1985: 1 x Sinn Féin, 1 x SDLP, 1 x UUP, 1 x DUP, 1 x Independent Unionist

1989: 1 x Sinn Féin, 1 x SDLP, 1 x UUP, 1 x DUP, 1 x Independent Unionist

1985-1989 Change: No change

Drum Manor - 5 seats
Party	Candidate	FPv%	Count				
Party	Candidate	FPv%	1	2	3	4	5
UUP	Samuel Glasgow*	21.37%	1,096				
Sinn Féin	Sean Begley	18.83%	966				
DUP	Walter Millar*	16.83%	863				
Ind. Unionist	Samuel Parke*	14.56%	747	977.56			
SDLP	James McGarvey*	12.63%	648	649.32	668.68	706.68	775.68
SDLP	Sean Mallon	8.83%	453	453.22	458.28	487.26	512.48
Sinn Féin	Desmond McElhatton	5.19%	266	266.22	266.44	278.44	
Workers' Party	Desmond Gourley	1.75%	90	92.42	115.08		
Electorate: 6,167 Valid: 5,129 (83.17%) Spoilt: 167 Quota: 855 Turnout: 5,296 (85.88%)

== 1985 Election ==
1985: 1 x Sinn Féin, 1 x DUP, 1 x UUP, 1 x SDLP, 1 x Independent Unionist

Drum Manor - 5 seats
Party	Candidate	FPv%	Count				
Party	Candidate	FPv%	1	2	3	4	5
DUP	Walter Millar	21.78%	1,120				
UUP	Samuel Glasgow*	20.26%	1,042				
SDLP	James McGarvey	17.66%	908				
Ind. Unionist	Samuel Parke*	9.47%	487	746.92	929.26		
Sinn Féin	Tony O'Driscoll	15.63%	804	804.48	804.66	808.26	830.94
Sinn Féin	Sean Begley	15.21%	782	782.72	782.72	787.76	812.42
Electorate: 6,017 Valid: 5,143 (85.47%) Spoilt: 105 Quota: 858 Turnout: 5,248 (87.22%)
