= Alan Kane (politician) =

Cookstown District Councillor
- In office 15 May 1985 – 19 May 1993
- Preceded by: New district
- Succeeded by: William Larmour
- Constituency: Cookstown Central
- In office 20 May 1981 – 15 May 1985
- Preceded by: John Warwick
- Succeeded by: District abolished
- Constituency: Cookstown Area C

Member of the Northern Ireland Assembly for Mid Ulster
- In office 20 October 1982 – 1986
- Preceded by: Assembly reconvened
- Succeeded by: Assembly dissolved

Personal details
- Party: Independent Unionist (1992 - 1993)
- Other political affiliations: Democratic Unionist Party (until 1992)

Alan Kane is a former Democratic Unionist Party (DUP) politician, barrister and King's Counsel from Northern Ireland.

== Background ==
Kane made his political debut in 1981, topping the council poll in Cookstown Town and was elected to the Northern Ireland Assembly the following year for Mid Ulster.

Kane was opposed to any form of compromise with Irish nationalist parties, attacking the Social Democratic and Labour Party (SDLP) as "republicans and subversives" and stating that Catholics "support the IRA to a large extent."

In 1985, he became involved in the controversy over re-routing of Orange Order marches through Nationalist areas in Cookstown, stating that one of the most senior Royal Ulster Constabulary (RUC) officers, Leo Dolan, "as a Roman Catholic and former neighbour of Owen Carron's family is no friend of the Protestant people."

Kane quit the DUP in 1992 in protest at the party's decision to become involved in a talks process which also involved the Irish Government, and stepped down from Cookstown council the following year.

Northern Ireland Assembly (1982)
New assembly	MPA for Mid-Ulster; 1982–1986	Assembly abolished
Party political offices
Preceded by William Beattie	General Secretary of the Democratic Unionist Party; 1983–1992	Succeeded by Nigel Dodds
