= Walter Millar =

Northern Irish unionist politician

Member of Cookstown District Council
- In office 15 May 1985 – 19 May 1993
- Preceded by: Seat created
- Succeeded by: William Cuddy
- Constituency: Drum Manor

Personal details
- Born: Newmills, County Tyrone, Northern Ireland
- Party: TUV (2007 - 2019); DUP (before 1993)
- Other political affiliations: UKUP (2007); Ulster Independence (1993 - 1996)

Walter Millar is a Northern Irish unionist politician.

== Early years ==
Millar grew up on a farm in Newmills, County Tyrone. He became the founding secretary of the Newmills Apprentice Boys in 1982.

== Early career ==
He was elected to Cookstown District Council for the Democratic Unionist Party (DUP) at the 1985 local elections, and held his seat in 1989. For part of this period, he served as vice-chairman of the council.

Millar resigned from the DUP in the mid-1990s, joining the Ulster Independence Movement. He stood for his new party in Mid Ulster at the 1996 elections to the Northern Ireland Forum, but his list only took 263 votes, and he was not elected. He also failed to be elected from his fourth place on the party's regional list.

== Career ==
Millar was also a leading figure in the Tyrone Orange Order, and rose to become Deputy Grand Master to Joel Patton. Like Patton, he was a leading figure in the Spirit of Drumcree group, and the two were compelled to leave the Order in 1998.

Opposing the St Andrews Agreement, Millar joined the UK Unionist Party, and stood in Mid Ulster again at the 2007 Northern Ireland Assembly election. In one of the party's better results, he took 2.7% of the votes cast. The party disbanded soon afterwards, and Millar became the founding Mid Ulster Chairman of Traditional Unionist Voice. He stood in the Westminster constituency of Mid Ulster at the 2010 general election, holding his deposit, taking fifth place and 7.3% of the votes cast. The following year, he stood in the equivalent constituency at the Assembly election, and received 4.7% of the vote. He also stood for the TUV in Cookstown at the 2011 local elections, but came bottom of the poll, with 461 votes.

The TUV decided to support an Independent Unionist unity candidate, Nigel Lutton, at the 2013 Mid Ulster by-election and Millar was among those who signed Lutton's nomination papers.
