= Patsy McGlone =

Irish politician (born 1959)

Patsy McGlone MLA
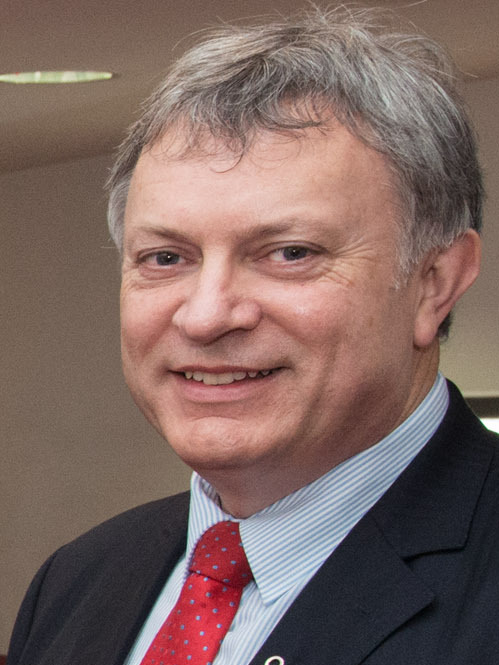

Deputy Speaker of the Northern Ireland Assembly
- In office 12 May 2016 – 3 February 2024
- Preceded by: John Dallat
- Succeeded by: Steve Aiken

Deputy Leader of the Social Democratic and Labour Party
- In office 2010–2011
- Leader: Margaret Ritchie
- Preceded by: Alasdair McDonnell
- Succeeded by: Dolores Kelly

General secretary of the Social Democratic and Labour Party
- In office 1986–1992
- Leader: John Hume
- Preceded by: Eamon Hanna
- Succeeded by: Gerry Cosgrove

Member of the Northern Ireland Assembly for Mid Ulster
- Incumbent
- Assumed office 26 November 2003
- Preceded by: Denis Haughey

Member of Cookstown District Council
- In office 19 May 1993 – 2009
- Preceded by: Deidre Mayo
- Succeeded by: John O'Neill
- Constituency: Ballinderry

Member of the Northern Ireland Forum for Mid Ulster
- In office 30 May 1996 – 25 April 1998
- Preceded by: New forum
- Succeeded by: Forum dissolved

Personal details
- Born: July 8, 1959 (age 67) Ballinderry, Northern Ireland
- Party: SDLP
- Spouse: Geraldine McGlone
- Website: Official Website

Patsy McGlone (born 8 July 1959) is an Irish Social Democratic and Labour Party (SDLP) politician who was Deputy Speaker of the Northern Ireland Assembly from 2016 to 2024. He also served as Deputy leader of the SDLP from 2010 to 2011. McGlone has been a Member of the Northern Ireland Assembly (MLA) for Mid Ulster since 2003.

== Career ==
From 1993 to 2009, McGlone was also Councillor in Cookstown District Council. He was chairman of the council in 2002–2003 and 2005–2006. In 1996 he was elected to the Northern Ireland Forum from Mid-Ulster.

McGlone was the unsuccessful running mate to Denis Haughey at the 1998 Northern Ireland Assembly election, being the last candidate to be eliminated in Mid Ulster, with 9.4% of first-preference votes.

=== Member of the Northern Ireland Assembly ===
McGlone won election to the Assembly at the 2003 election, unseating Haughey for the SDLP's sole seat in the constituency.

At the 2005 general election, he finished third, with 17.4% of the vote, in Mid Ulster.

While canvassing for McGlone for the 2011 local and assembly elections, election workers had their car attacked with a petrol bomb by loyalists in Coagh.

McGlone contested the 2013 Mid Ulster by-election, where he came third with 6,478 votes (17.3%), behind Independent Unionist candidate Nigel Lutton.

On 12 May 2016, McGlone was elected Deputy Speaker of the Northern Ireland Assembly.

On 29 May 2026, McGlone announced that he will retire at the end of the current mandate and will not contest the next Northern Ireland Assembly election.

== Membership of organisations ==
- Board Member of Foras na Gaeilge
- A member of the EU Structural Funds Monitoring Committee for Northern Ireland
- Board Member of the Northern Ireland Housing Executive
- Member of the Northern Ireland Housing Council
- Member of the Irish Central Border Area Network (ICBAN)
- Vice Chairman of Loughshore Foot and Mouth Support Group.

He was a candidate for the leadership of the SDLP in 2011, after announcing in July that he would stand against party leader Margaret Ritchie.

Party political offices
Preceded by Eamon Hanna	General Secretary of the Social Democratic and Labour Party; 1986–1992	Succeeded by Gerry Cosgrove
Preceded by Alasdair McDonnell	Deputy Leader of the Social Democratic and Labour Party; 2010–2011	Succeeded by Dolores Kelly
Northern Ireland Forum
New forum	Member for Mid-Ulster; 1996–1998	Forum dissolved
Northern Ireland Assembly
Preceded by Denis Haughey	MLA for Mid-Ulster; 2003–present	Incumbent
Preceded by Roy Beggs Jr; John Dallat	Deputy Speaker; 2016–2017; With: Danny Kennedy	Vacant Assembly suspended
