= Denis Haughey =

Irish nationalist politician

Junior Minister Assisting the Deputy First Minister
- In office 30 May 2000 – 14 October 2002
- Deputy FM: Seamus Mallon; Mark Durkan
- Preceded by: Himself
- Succeeded by: Gerry Kelly
- In office 2 December 1999 – 11 February 2000
- Deputy FM: Seamus Mallon
- Preceded by: Office established
- Succeeded by: Himself

Member of the Northern Ireland Assembly for Mid Ulster
- In office 25 June 1998 – 26 November 2003
- Preceded by: New Creation
- Succeeded by: Patsy McGlone

Personal details
- Born: 3 October 1944 (age 82) Coalisland, Northern Ireland
- Party: SDLP
- Education: Queen's University Belfast

Denis Haughey (born 3 October 1944) is a former Irish nationalist politician in Northern Ireland.

== Background ==
Born in Coalisland, Haughey studied politics at Queens University, Belfast, becoming involved in the civil rights movement and the first Chair of the Tyrone Civil Rights Association and a founder member of the Social Democratic and Labour Party (SDLP), before becoming a teacher. From 1972 until 1977, he was the party's Chairman.

Haughey stood against Frank McManus for the Westminster seat of Fermanagh and South Tyrone in February 1974, splitting the nationalist vote and letting in Harry West of the Ulster Unionist Party. He unsuccessfully contested North Antrim in the 1975 election to the Northern Ireland Constitutional Convention

In 1980, Haughey left teaching to work as the full-time assistant to SDLP leader John Hume. During this period, he served as the party's International Secretary, and represented the SDLP on the Executives of the Party of European Socialists and the Socialist International. At the 1982 Northern Ireland Assembly election, Haughey was elected to represent Mid Ulster, but with other SDLP candidates did not take his seat, and instead joined the New Ireland Forum. He stood unsuccessfully for the Westminster seat of Mid Ulster at every general election from 1983 until 1997.

In 1989, Haughey was elected to Cookstown District Council, later becoming the leader of the SDLP group on the council. He led the SDLP team in the Brooke-Mayhew Talks and later the talks which led to the Good Friday Agreement. In 1996 he was an unsuccessful candidate in the Northern Ireland Forum election in Mid-Ulster. At the 1998 Assembly election, he was again elected for Mid Ulster. However, he lost his seat at the 2003 election, and in 2004 was unsuccessful in becoming the party's candidate for the European election.

Northern Ireland Assembly (1982)
New assembly	MPA for Mid-Ulster; 1982–1986	Assembly abolished
Northern Ireland Assembly
New assembly	MLA for Mid-Ulster; 1998–2003	Succeeded by Patsy McGlone
Political offices
New office	Junior Minister; 1999–2000	Vacant Office suspended Title next held by self
Vacant Office suspended Title last held by self	Junior Minister; 2000–2002	Vacant Office suspended
Party political offices
Preceded by Eddie McGrady	Chairperson of the Social Democratic and Labour Party; 1973–1978	Succeeded by Bríd Rodgers
