= Cookstown District Council =

Former district council in Northern Ireland

Coordinates: 54.646°N 6.745°W

Cookstown District
- Area: 622 km^{2} (240 sq mi); Ranked 9th of 26
- District HQ: Cookstown
- Catholic: 59.3%
- Protestant: 37.8%
- Country: Northern Ireland
- Sovereign state: United Kingdom
- Councillors: MLAs Mid Ulster Sinn Féin: 3 DUP: 1 SDLP: 1; MPs Francie Molloy (Sinn Féin)
- Website: www.cookstown.gov.uk

Map of the district's DEAs from 1993 to 2014

Cookstown District Council was a district council covering an area largely in County Tyrone and partly in County Londonderry. It merged with Dungannon and South Tyrone Borough Council and Magherafelt District Council in May 2015 under local government reorganisation in Northern Ireland to become Mid-Ulster District Council.

Council headquarters were in Cookstown. Small towns in the council area included Pomeroy, Moneymore, Coagh and Stewartstown and in the east the area was bounded by Lough Neagh. It covered an area of 235 square miles (610 km^{2}) and had a population of over 37,000.

The council had 16 elected representatives. Local elections were held every four years using the single transferable vote system. The chairman and vice-chairman of the council were elected at the annual general meeting each June. The last election was due to take place in May 2009, but on 25 April 2008, Shaun Woodward, Secretary of State for Northern Ireland announced that the scheduled 2009 district council elections were to be postponed until the introduction of the eleven new councils in 2011. The proposed reforms were abandoned in 2010, and the final district council elections took place in 2011

The Cookstown District Council area consisted of 3 electoral areas: Drum Manor, Ballinderry and Cookstown Central. At the last elections in 2011, members were elected from the following political parties: 6 Sinn Féin, 4 Social Democratic and Labour Party (SDLP), 3 Ulster Unionist Party (UUP) and 3 Democratic Unionist Party (DUP). In 2013/14, the council chairman was Councillor Pearse McAleer of Sinn Féin and the vice-chairman was Councillor Robert Kelly of the UUP. Both councillors represented the Ballinderry District Electoral Area.

Councillor Wilbert Buchanan of the Democratic Unionist Party was chairman in 2014/15.

In elections for the Westminster Parliament it was part of Mid Ulster.

== Population ==
The area covered by the Cookstown District Council had a population of 37,013 residents according to the 2011 Northern Ireland census.

== See also ==
- Local government in Northern Ireland
