= Northern Ireland Sites and Monuments Record =

State archaeological database

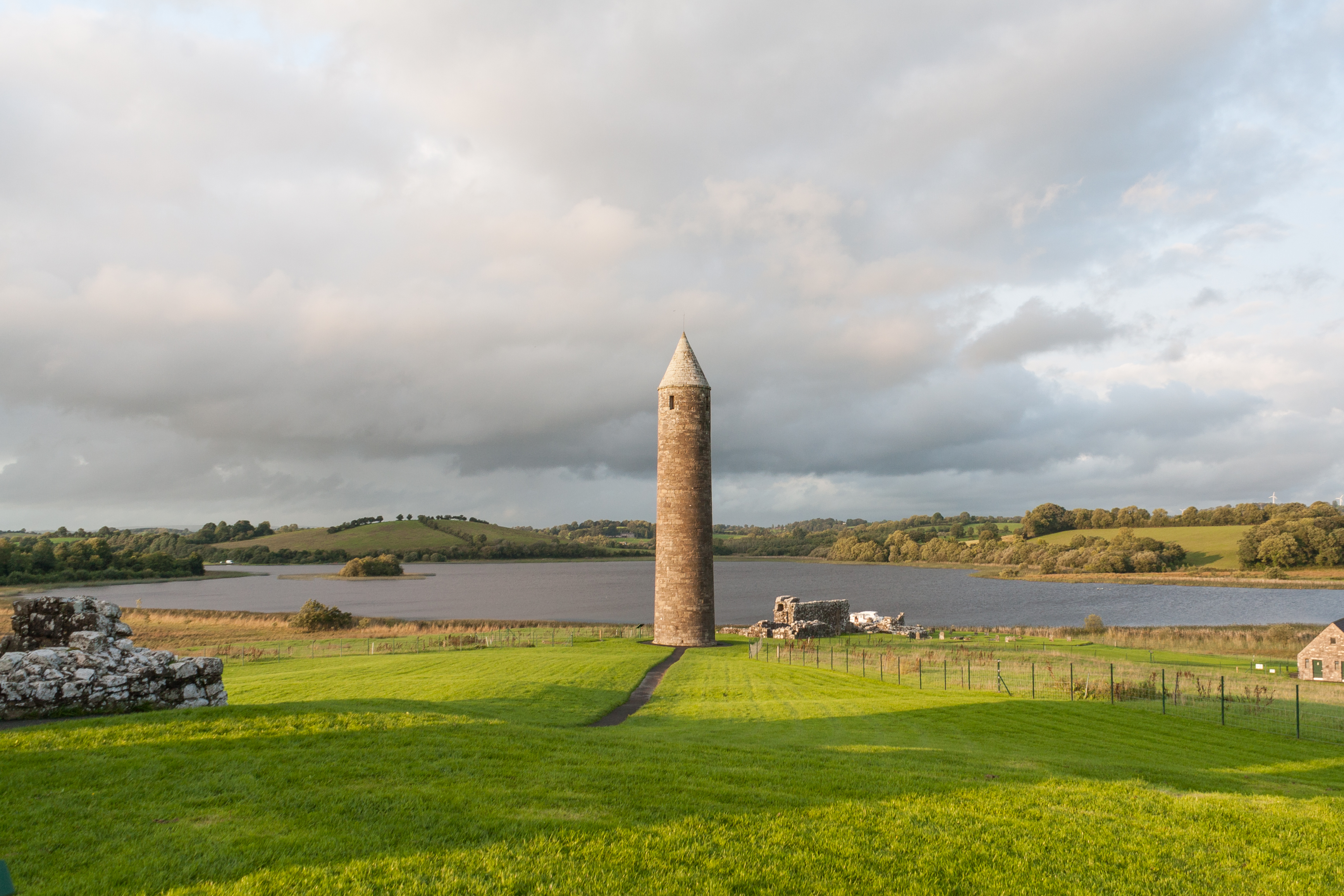
Round tower of the ecclesiastical site at Devenish Island, in state care since 1880 and recorded as FER 211:021.

The Northern Ireland Sites and Monuments Record (NISMR) is a statuary database maintained by the Historic Environment Division within the Department for Communities with more than 18,000 records of archaeological sites and monuments in Northern Ireland. The legislative protection distinguishes between ancient monuments and architectural heritage. Newer buildings of architectural or historical interest are protected as listed buildings. The cut-off date tends to be around 1700.

== History ==
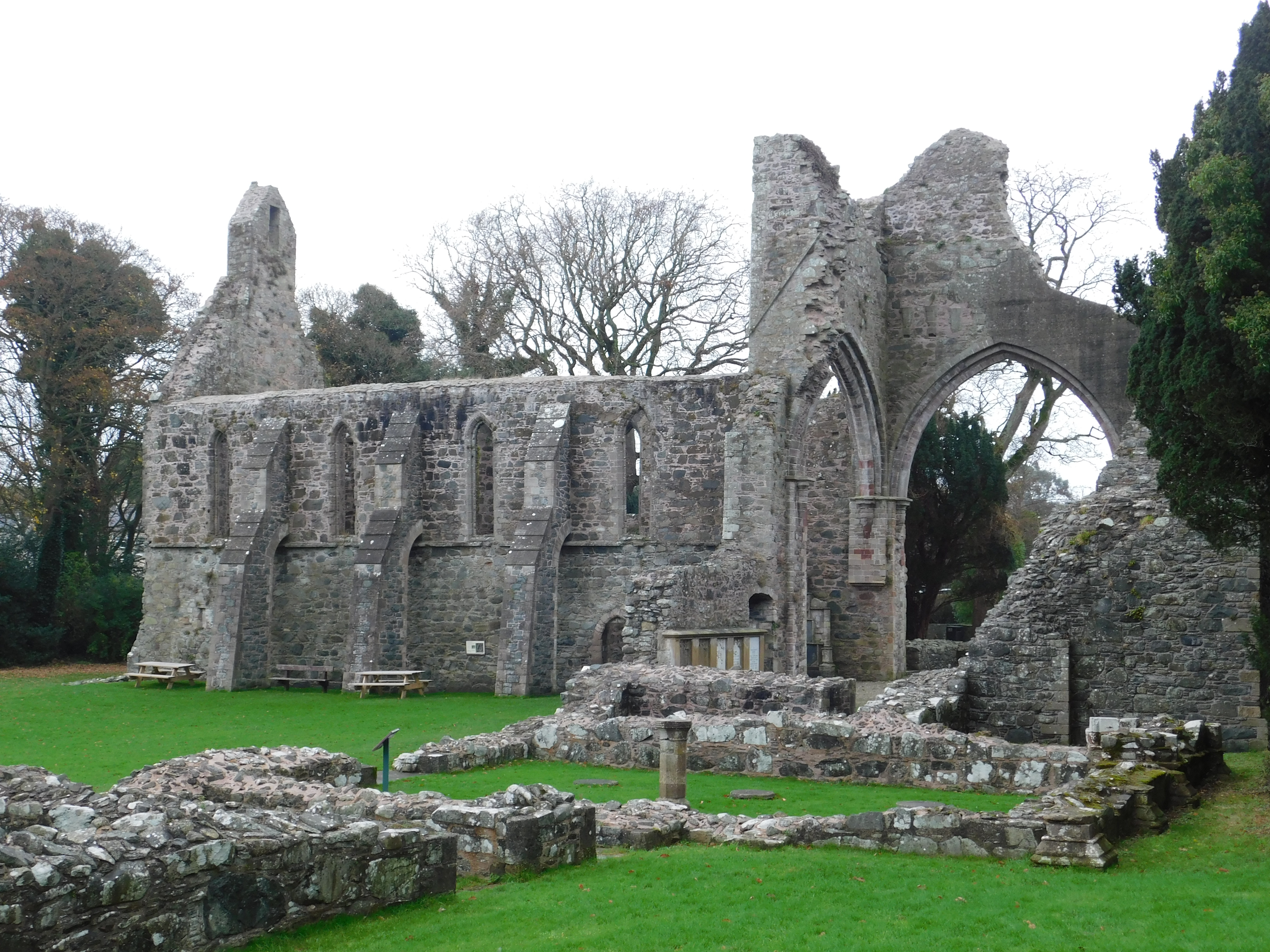
The leaning south wall of the nave of Grey Abbey in County Down, in state care since 1907 and recorded as DOW 011:010, was in 1908 safe-guarded with three massive buttresses by the Commissioners of Public Works in Ireland. The similarity to Gothic flying buttresses that incorrectly suggest a former vaulted ceiling was later criticized.

The protection of monuments in Northern Ireland began with the Irish Church Act 1869 (32 & 33 Vict. c. 42) which gave the commissioners the power to preserve ruinous or disused places of public worship by passing them into the trust of the Commissioners of Public Works in Ireland. This was done for 19 ecclesiastical sites in Northern Ireland until 1880 and included for example Devenish Island or Layd Church. This legislation preceded the Ancient Monuments Protection Act 1882 (45 & 46 Vict. c. 73) which introduced conservation for the entire United Kingdom. More sites like Navan Fort or Giant's Ring followed through the Ancient Monuments Protection Act 1882 in 1907, 1910, 1914, 1917, and 1919 to a total of 25 protected monuments in state care. However, no Royal Commission on the Ancient and Historical Monuments was established for Ireland as it was done in 1908 for England, Scotland, and Wales due to the impending home rule.

The protected sites were transferred to Stormont after the Irish War of Independence. This was continued in the period from 1927 to 1938 when 25 additional monuments were taken into state care. This included sites like Drumskinny and Dunluce Castle. The Irish Land Act 1903 (3 Edw. 7. c. 37) provided the option to transfer ownership of monuments to the Commissioners of Public Works, and if they refused, alternatively to the respective county councils. The latter was done for 47 monuments which were eventually transferred through the Historic Monuments (Transfer) Order (Northern Ireland) 1973 (SR&O(NI) 1973/325) to the government of Northern Ireland. This included monuments like Annadorn Dolmen or Enniskillen Castle.

The Ancient Monuments Act (Northern Ireland) 1926 (16 & 17 Geo. 5. c. 12 (N.I.)) established an Ancient Monuments Advisory Committee and introduced a status of so-called scheduled monuments. This allowed important archaeological sites or historic buildings to be protected without taking them into state care. The Northern Ireland Ministry of Finance was responsible for ancient monuments until 1976. But there was initially no identifiable person or group responsible for the monuments until 1924 a Public Record Office was created which was headed by a Deputy Keeper of Records. This post was held by the archivist and historian David Alfred Chart (1878–1960) who had worked before for the Public Record Office in Dublin.

In 1928, an initial description of the monuments in state care was published, covering 27 sites. A first statuary list of protected monuments followed in the Ancient Monuments Order (Northern Ireland) 1932 (SR&O(NI) 1932/139) that included numerous sites in private property.

The Ancient Monuments Advisory Committee, eventually renamed to a council, decided in 1934 to undertake a survey of the sites and monuments in Northern Ireland. This project was headed by Chart and supported by Emyr Estyn Evans as expert for prehistoric monuments and Henry Cairnes Lawlor (1870–1943) as expert for the monuments of Antrim and Down at the east coast of Northern Ireland. They decided to publish a preliminary survey and got the permission by the Ministry of Finance once a sufficient number of subscribers have been found. The work was published in 1940 and covered all known and newly found monuments with descriptions. This was based mainly on the maps of the Irish Ordnance Survey and newer findings. Raths, holy wells, and small ruins with no architectural significance were not included due to their large numbers. Until now this is still the only work covering the whole of Northern Ireland.

When Chart retired in 1948, he was succeeded by W. A. Stuart in a minor part-time function as secretary to the Ancient Monuments Advisory Council. For the necessary archaeological expertise, Queen's University got formally involved in the care of archaeological monuments by nominating then lecturer Martyn Jope as the Ministry's Archaeological Officer who was tasked to "supervise from the archaeological standpoint [..] in consultation with the Ministry's administrative and technical staff." The ministry employed two archaeologists, Dudley Waterman (1917–1979) and Pat Collins (c. 1921–1991), in June 1950 who worked under Jope as inspectors of ancient monuments in the archaeological survey. They started with County Down and worked on this project for twelve years. Jope took on the job of editorship for the publication for An Archaeological Survey of County Down. He continued this work even after his duties as archaeological officer ended in 1959. When the volume was published in 1966, it was the first published full archaeological survey of a county on the island of Ireland. As stated by Jope in his foreword, the survey "was conceived from the start on the principle that it was of little value to make a mere record of often unintelligible heaps of stone or earth or fragments of walls, without an attempt to understand the monument as it was when in use and in its original environment. Hence the excavation of a representative series of monuments has been regarded as an integral part of the Survey work".

The preservation of monuments was unsatisfactory at that time due to insufficient funds and the lack of a dedicated architect. This had to be delegated to the Chief Architect's office where this had a low priority. Jope reported in 1954 that "the situation of some monuments is really most serious and has reached the point where something drastic must be done", naming Inch Abbey and Harry Avery's Castle as examples. The Assistant Secretary of the Ministry of Finance, F. J. Falkiner, joined the pressure by stating that "[t]here are at present 58 monuments in State Charge and some 35 to 40 require regular structural maintenance. At most of the monuments there are heavy arrears of maintenance; and, owing to inattention, there have been serious falls of masonry" and cited Sketrick Castle and Armagh Friary as examples. They succeeded and in February 1955, Harold Meek was installed as Ancient Monuments Architect in the Ministry of Finance.

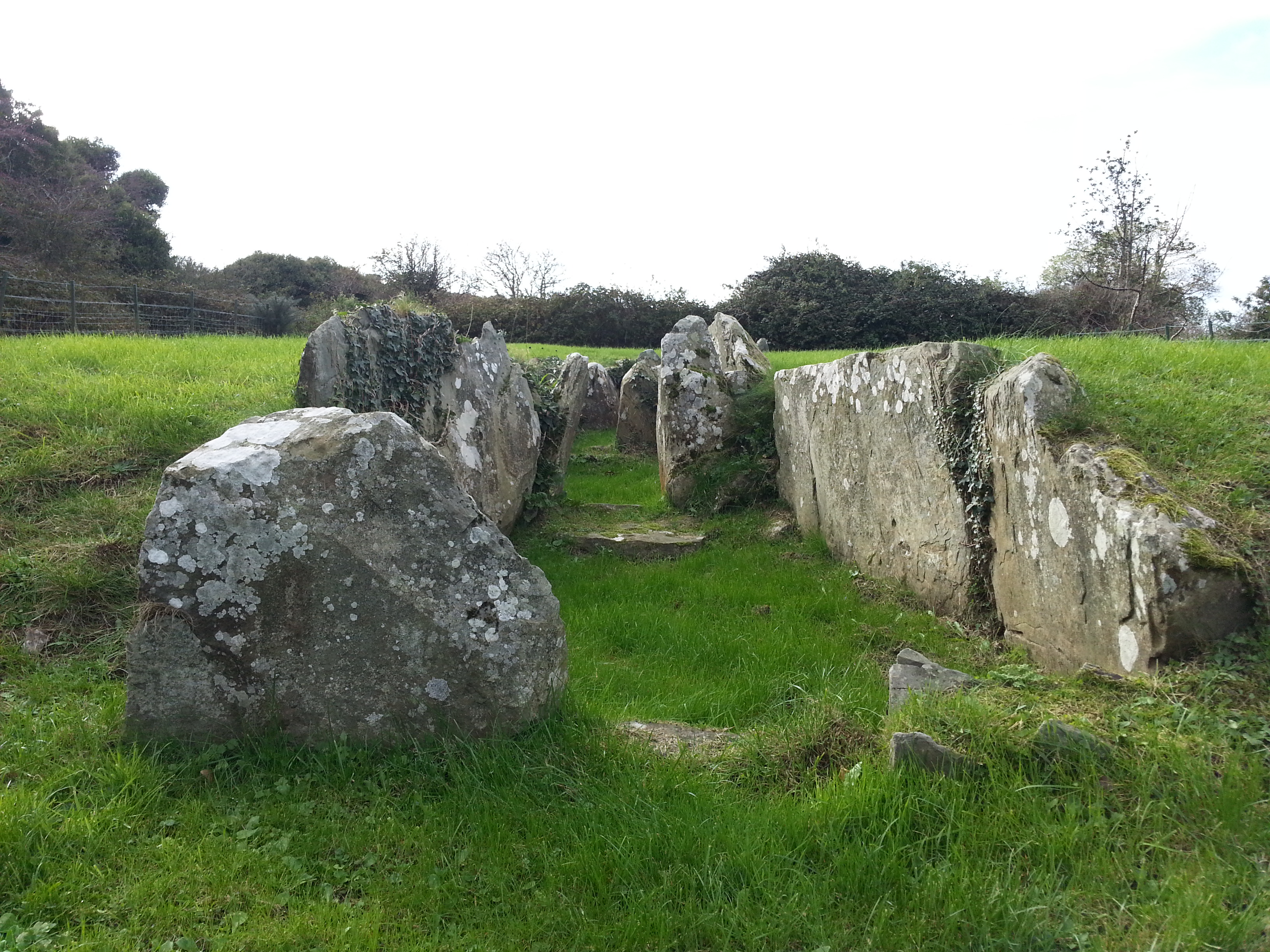
North-eastern fourcourt of Audleystown Court Tomb, recorded as DOW 031:007 and in state care, after its restoration in 1958 under the direction of Harold Meek and Pat Collins. The left stone in front was found in the adjacent field, assumed to be robbed from its original position, and re-erected.

Harold Meek introduced a new and more modest conservation approach to archaeological sites. The first prominent example is Audleystown Court Tomb which was first discovered in 1946 and then fully excavated in 1952. After finishing the excavations, the burial galleries were filled with sand to the preserve the site. In 1958 the site was cleared again in the manner of a controlled excavation which led to new findings. Then the revetment walls were conserved. Stones that were misaligned due to the pressure of the cairn were moved back in alignment and their position was fixed using concrete. The intention was to easily see what was found and kept undisturbed and what has been put back. The conservation did not attempt to restore the lintels or the cairn.

After finishing the fieldwork for County Down, the Archaeological Survey moved back from Queen's University to the Ministry of Finance and Dudley Waterman was increasingly tasked with the maintenance of the monuments and emergency excavations. The next project was County Armagh where fieldwork started in the early 1960s. Of pivotal importance was the excavation of Navan Fort under direction of Dudley Waterman which began in 1961 and was continued in 1963 to 1971. The site is known in the Ulster Cycle as Emain Macha, the site of Conchobar mac Nessa.

The Historic Monuments Act (Northern Ireland) 1971 replaced the Ancient Monuments Advisory Council by the Historic Monuments Council. It was regarded as the best protective legislation in the United Kingdom but falling short to protect effectively against illegal digging or establishing a single official repository for small finds.

With a larger team the database was extended by researching the 6-inch Ordnance Survey maps, associated documentary sources, air photographs, and third-party information. End of the 1980s, the database had about 12,000 records. The research and documentation for the counties Armagh and Fermanagh was already advanced in the 1980s. Nonetheless, these projects were frequently suspended due to an increasing number of rescue excavations due to building projects and other duties.

In 1976, the team was moved from the Ministry of Finance to the Department of the Environment for Northern Ireland where it joined the team responsible for historic buildings to a newly formed Historic Monuments an Buildings Branch. This became the Historic Environment Division in 2015. During the major reorganization of the Northern Ireland government in May 2016, the Historic Environment Division along with NISMR was transferred to the newly founded Department for Communities.

== Publications ==
- An Account of the Ancient Monuments in State Charge (2nd ed.). Belfast: His Majesty's Stationery Office. 1928.
- "The Ancient Monuments Order (Northern Ireland) 1932". legislation.gov.uk. 1932.
- Chart, David Alfred Chart, ed. (1940). A preliminary survey of the ancient monuments of Northern Ireland. Belfast: His Majesty's Stationery Office.
- Jope, Edward Martyn, ed. (1966). An Archaeological Survey of County Down. Belfast: Her Majesty's Stationery Office.
- Neill, Ken, ed. (2009). An Archaeological Survey of County Armagh. Belfast: Northern Ireland Environment Agency. ISBN 978-0-337-08878-0.
- Forsythe, Wes; McConkey, Rosemary, eds. (2012). Rathlin Island: An Archaeological Survey of a Maritime Landscape. Belfast: Northern Ireland Environment Agency. ISBN 978-0-337-09704-1.
- Foley, Claire; McHugh, Ronan, eds. (2014). An Archaeological Survey of County Fermanagh. Vol. 1. Belfast: Northern Ireland Environment Agency. ISBN 978-1-907053-76-4.

== See also ==
- Sites and Monuments Record (UK)
- List of Northern Ireland ministers, government departments and executive agencies
