= Administrative county =

First-level administrative division

- Category: County
- Location: England and Wales and Ireland
- Created by: Local Government Act 1888; Local Government (Ireland) Act 1898
- Created: England and Wales 1889; Ireland 1899
- Abolished by: Local Government (Boundaries) Act (Northern Ireland) 1971; Local Government Act 1972; Local Government Act 2001
- Abolished: Northern Ireland 1973; England and Wales 1974; Republic of Ireland 2002
- Government: County council
- Subdivisions: Rural district; Urban district; Municipal borough

An administrative county was a first-level administrative division in England and Wales from 1888 to 1974, from 1899 until 1973 in Northern Ireland, and from 1899 to 2002 in the Republic of Ireland. They are now abolished, although most Northern Ireland lieutenancy areas and Republic of Ireland counties have the same boundaries as former administrative countries.

== History ==
=== England and Wales ===
The term was introduced for England and Wales by the Local Government Act 1888, which created county councils for various areas, and called them administrative counties to distinguish them from the continuing statutory counties.

In England and Wales the legislation was repealed in 1974, and entities called 'metropolitan and non-metropolitan counties' in England and 'counties' in Wales were introduced in their place. Though strictly inaccurate, these are often called 'administrative counties' to distinguish them from both the historic counties, and the ceremonial counties.

=== Scotland ===
For local government purposes Scottish counties were replaced in 1975 with a system of regions and island council areas.

=== Ireland ===
The Local Government (Ireland) Act 1898 created administrative counties in Ireland on the same model that had been used in England and Wales.

In Northern Ireland the administrative counties were replaced by a system of 26 districts on 1 October 1973. Section 131 of the Local Government Act (Northern Ireland) 1972 stated that "every county and every county borough shall cease to be an administrative area for local government purposes". The areas of the former administrative counties (and county boroughs) remain in use for Lieutenancy purposes, being defined as the areas used "for local government purposes immediately before 1 October 1973, subject to any subsequent definition of their boundaries …".

In the Republic of Ireland the legislation that created them remained in force until 1 January 2002, when they were renamed as counties under the Local Government Act 2001. The term administrative county is retained by the Placenames Database of Ireland to distinguish the modern counties in Dublin of Dún Laoghaire–Rathdown, Fingal and South Dublin from the traditional counties, which include County Dublin.

== New entities ==
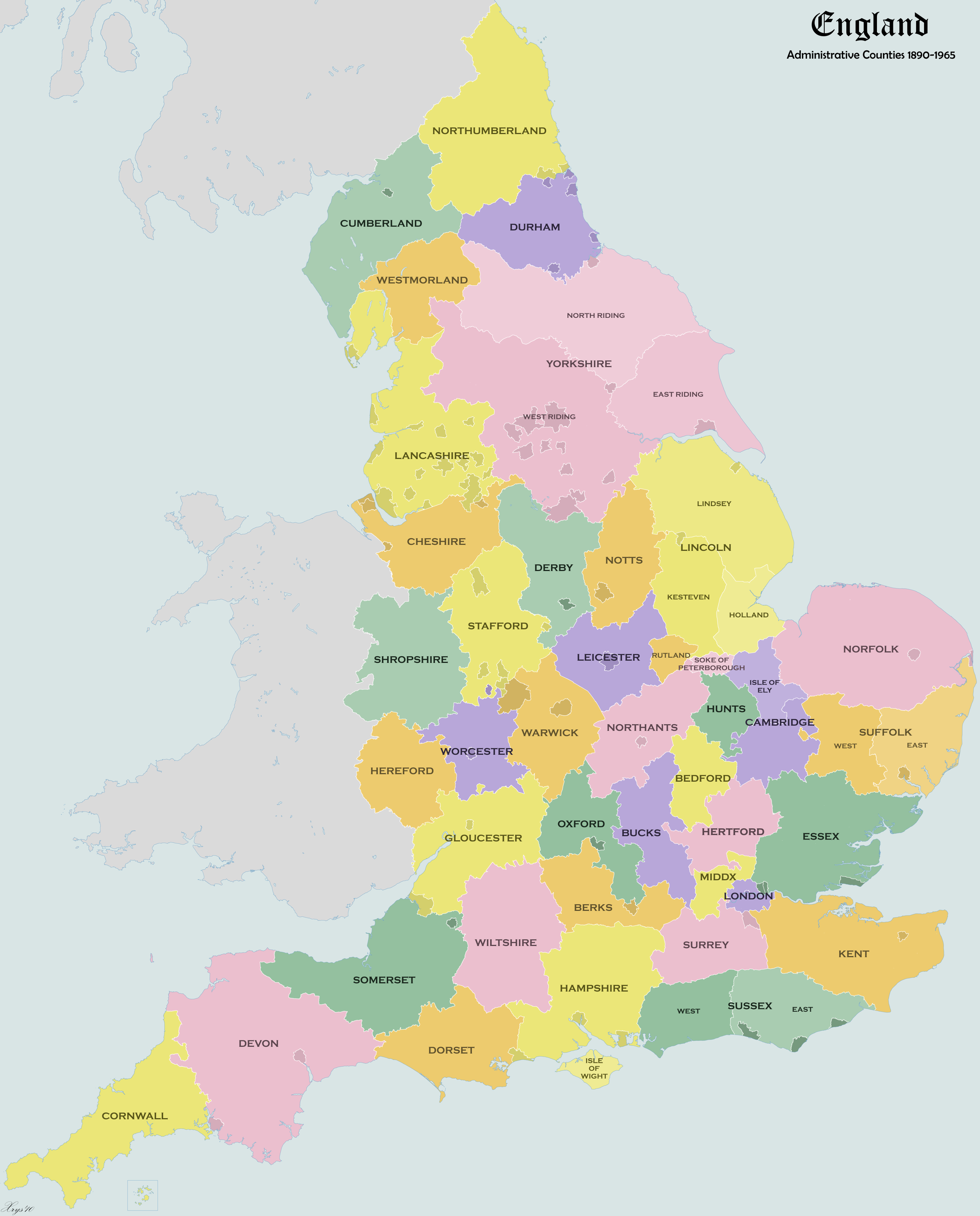
England – administrative counties 1890–1965.

The administrative counties that did not share the names of previous counties:

England

| County | Administrative counties |
|---|---|
| Cambridgeshire | Isle of Ely |
| Hampshire | Isle of Wight |
| Lincolnshire | Holland, Kesteven, Lindsey |
| London | London |
| Northamptonshire | Soke of Peterborough |
| Suffolk | East Suffolk, West Suffolk |
| Sussex | East Sussex, West Sussex |
| Yorkshire | East Riding, North Riding, West Riding |

Scotland

- Ross-shire and Cromartyshire (Ross and Cromarty)

Republic of Ireland

- Dún Laoghaire–Rathdown, Fingal and South Dublin (County Dublin). Created in 1994.

== See also ==
- List of articles about local government in the United Kingdom
