= List of statutory rules and orders of Northern Ireland, 1967 =

This is an incomplete list of statutory rules and orders of Northern Ireland during 1967. Statutory rules and orders were the predecessor of statutory rules and they formed the secondary legislation of Northern Ireland between 1922 and 1973.

| Number | Title |
|---|---|
| No. 68 | Office and Shop Premises (Exemption) Order (Northern Ireland) 1967 |
| No. 132 | Construction (Lifting Operations) Certificates(Amendment) Order (Northern Ireland) 1967 |
| No. 138 | Docks Certificates Order (Northern Ireland) 1967 |
| No. 176 | Construction (Health and Welfare) Regulations (Northern Ireland) 1967 |
| No. 186 | Office and Shop Premises (Exemption) (No. 2) Order (Northern Ireland) 1967 |
| No. 188 | Office and Shop Premises (Washing Facilities) Regulations (Northern Ireland) 1967 |
| No. 195 | Office and Shop Premises (Sanitary Conveniences) Regulations (Northern Ireland) 1967 |
| No. 262 | Belfast Water Order (Northern Ireland) 1967 |
| No. 637 | Weights and Measures Regulations (Northern Ireland) 1967 |

== See also ==
- List of statutory rules of Northern Ireland
