= List of statutory rules and orders of Northern Ireland, 1948 =

This is an incomplete list of statutory rules and orders of Northern Ireland during 1948. Statutory rules and orders were the predecessor of statutory rules and they formed the secondary legislation of Northern Ireland between 1922 and 1973.

| Number | Title |
|---|---|
| No. 1 | The Belfast Corporation Tramways and Trolly Vehicles (Increase of Fares) Order (Northern Ireland) 1948 |
| No. 2 | The Compulsory School Age (Postponement) Order (Northern Ireland) 1948 |
| No. 3 | |
| No. 4 | The Rate of Payment to the Ministry of Commerce (Northern Ireland) 1948 |
| No. 5 | |
| No. 6 | The General Waste Materials Reclamation Wages Council (Northern Ireland) Wages Regulations Order (Northern Ireland) 1948 |
| No. 7 | The Grammar Schools (Admissions and Scholarships) Regulations (Northern Ireland) 1948 |
| No. 8 | |
| No. 9 | The Ministry of Finance Capital Purposes Fund Regulations (Northern Ireland) 1948 |
| No. 10 | The Rate of Interest (Housing) Order (Northern Ireland) 1948 |
| No. 11 | The Restriction of Traffic (Toome Bridge, Counties Antrim and Londonderry) Order (Northern Ireland) 1948 |
| No. 12 | |
| No. 13 | The Safeguarding of Employment (Exemption) Order (Northern Ireland) 1948 |
| No. 14 | |
| No. 15 | The Brush and Broom Wages Council Wages Regulations Order (Northern Ireland) 1948 |
| No. 16 | The Brush and Broom Wages Council Wages Regulations (Holidays) Order (Northern Ireland) 1948 |
| No. 17 | The Increase of Pensions (Calculation of Income) (Amendment) Regulations (Northern Ireland) 1948 |
| No. 18 | The Marketing of Fruit (Amendment) Rules (Northern Ireland) 1948 |
| No. 19 | The Health Services (Appointed Day) Order (Northern Ireland) 1948 |
| No. 20 | The Dangerous Drugs Act (Application) Order (Northern Ireland) 1948 |
| No. 21 | The Public Health and Local Government (Transfer of Functions) Order (Northern Ireland) 1948 |
| No. 22 | The Building Society Regulations (Northern Ireland) 1948 |
| No. 23 | The Trade Union Regulations (Northern Ireland) 1948 |
| No. 24 | The Local Education Authorities (Compulsory Acquisition of Land) Regulations (Northern Ireland) 1948 |
| No. 25 | The Industrial Injuries Joint Authority to be a Rule-Making Authority under the Rules Publication Act (Northern Ireland) 1948 |
| No. 26 | The Health Authorities (Qualifications and Duties of Medical Officers) Regulations (Northern Ireland) 1948 |
| No. 27 | The Wild Birds (Mute Swan) Protection Order (Northern Ireland) 1948 |
| No. 28 | The National Insurance (Compensation) (Temporary Provisions) Regulations (Northern Ireland) 1948 |
| No. 29 | The Port Sanitary Regulations (Northern Ireland) 1948 |
| No. 30 | The Superannuation (Unestablished Service) Regulations (Northern Ireland) 1948 |
| No. 31 | The Port Sanitary (Revocation) Regulations (Northern Ireland) 1948 |
| No. 32 | The National Insurance (Appointed Day) Order (Northern Ireland) 1948 |
| No. 33 | The Royal Ulster Constabulary Pensions (Amendment) Order (Northern Ireland) 1948 |
| No. 34 | The Tillage Amendment Order (Northern Ireland) 1948 |
| No. 35 | The National Insurance (Industrial Injuries) (Appointed Day) Order (Northern Ireland) 1948 |
| No. 36 | The Resident Magistrates (Salaries and Allowances) Order (Northern Ireland) 1948 |
| No. 37 | The Drainage Act County Court Rules (Northern Ireland) 1948 |
| No. 38 | The Royal Ulster Constabulary Band Fund Account - Audit Regulations (Northern Ireland) 1948 |
| No. 39 | The National Insurance (Pensions, Existing Beneficiaries and Other Persons) (Transitional) Regulations (Northern Ireland) 1948 |
| No. 40 | The Health Services (Submission of Health Authority Proposals) Regulations (Northern Ireland) 1948 |
| No. 41 | The Registration of Catering Establishments Regulations (Northern Ireland) 1948 |
| No. 42 | The Revocation of Restriction on Engagement (Agriculture) Order (Northern Ireland) 1948 |
| No. 43 | The Revocation of Control of Employment (Agriculture) (Northern Ireland) 1948 |
| No. 44 | The Intermediate School (Grant Conditions) Regulations (Northern Ireland) 1948 |
| No. 45 | The National Insurance (Great Britain Reciprocal Arrangements) Regulations (Northern Ireland) 1948 |
| No. 46 | The Training Colleges (Admission of Students) Regulations (Northern Ireland) 1948 |
| No. 47 | The Equipment Grants Regulations (Northern Ireland) 1948 |
| No. 48 | The External Maintenance Grants Regulations (Northern Ireland) 1948 |
| No. 49 & 50 | |
| No. 51 | The Grass Seeds and Fertilisers General Order (Northern Ireland) 1948 |
| No. 52 | The Grammar School (Grant Conditions) Regulations (Northern Ireland) 1948 |
| No. 53 | |
| No. 54 | The Exchange Control County Court Rules (Northern Ireland) 1948 |
| No. 55 | The Primary Schools (Salaries and Allowances) Regulations (Northern Ireland) 1948 |
| No. 56 | The Institutions of Further Education (Salaries and Allowances of Teachers) Regulations (Northern Ireland) 1948 |
| No. 57 | The Grammar Schools (Salaries and Allowances of Teachers) Regulations (Northern Ireland) 1948 |
| No. 58 | The Intermediate School (Salaries and Allowances of Teachers) Regulations (Northern Ireland) 1948 |
| No. 59 | The Religious Education Regulations (Northern Ireland) 1948 |
| No. 60 | The Registration and Attendance of Pupils Regulations (Northern Ireland) 1948 |
| No. 61 | The Parliamentary Grant (Education Authorities) Regulations 1947-48 (Northern Ireland) 1948 |
| No. 62 | The Further Education (Grant Conditions) Regulations (Northern Ireland) 1948 |
| No. 63 | The Fire Services (Finance) Regulations (Northern Ireland) 1948 |
| No. 64 - 67 | |
| No. 68 | The Handicapped Pupils and Special Schools Regulations (Northern Ireland) 1948 |
| No. 69 | The Interchange of Teachers Regulations (Northern Ireland) 1948 |
| No. 70 | The National Insurance (Modification of Asylums Officers' Superannuation Act 1909) Regulations (Northern Ireland) 1948 |
| No. 71 | The Health Services (Appointed Day) (No. 2) Order (Northern Ireland) 1948 |
| No. 72 & 73 | |
| No. 74 | The Public Health and Local Government (Transfer of Functions) (No. 2) Order (Northern Ireland) 1948 |
| No. 75 | The Public Health and Local Government (Transfer of Functions) (No. 3) Order (Northern Ireland) 1948 |
| No. 76 | The Health Services - Hospitals - Exemption - Mater Infirmorum Hospital Order (Northern Ireland) 1948 |
| No. 77 | The Royal Ulster Constabulary Pay (Amendment) Order (Northern Ireland) 1948 |
| No. 78 | The Royal Ulster Constabulary (Women Members) Pay (Amendment) Order (Northern Ireland) 1948 |
| No. 79 | The Government of Northern Ireland 3 per cent. Stock Sinking Fund (Amendment) Regulations (Northern Ireland) 1948 |
| No. 80 | The Ulster Saving Certificates Redemption (Sinking Fund) Regulations (Northern Ireland) 1948 |
| No. 81 | The Health Services (Constitution of the Northern Ireland Hospitals Authority) Order (Northern Ireland) 1948 |
| No. 82 | The Health Services (Constitution of the Northern Ireland General Health Services Board) Order (Northern Ireland) 1948 |
| No. 83 | The Aerated Waters Wages Council Wages Regulations Order (Northern Ireland) 1948 |
| No. 84 | The Linen and Cotton Handkerchief and Household Goods and Linen Piece Goods Wages Council Wages Regulations (Amendment) Order (Northern Ireland) 1948 |
| No. 85 - 88 | |
| No. 89 | The Education (Heating, Lighting, Cleaning and Internal Maintenance Contribution) Regulations (Northern Ireland) 1948 |
| No. 90 | |
| No. 91 | The National Insurance (Modification of the Superannuation Acts) Regulations (Northern Ireland) 1948 |
| No. 92 | The National Insurance (Approved Societies) Regulations (Northern Ireland) 1948 |
| No. 93 | The Royal Ulster Constabulary (Women Members) Allowances Order (Northern Ireland) 1948 |
| No. 94 | The Royal Ulster Constabulary Allowances Order (Northern Ireland) 1948 |
| No. 95 | The Health Services (Transfer of Officers) Regulations (Northern Ireland) 1948 |
| No. 96 | The Meetings of Parents Regulations (County, Primary and Intermediate Schools) (Northern Ireland) 1948 |
| No. 97 | The Nursery Schools Regulations (Northern Ireland) 1948 |
| No. 98 | The Education (Representatives on School Management Committees) Regulations (Northern Ireland) 1948 |
| No. 99 | The Health Services (Return of Hospital Endowments) Regulations (Northern Ireland) 1948 |
| No. 100 | The Health Services (Northern Ireland General Health Services Board Officers) Regulations (Northern Ireland) 1948 |
| No. 101 | The Health Services (Northern Ireland Hospitals Authority Officers) Regulations (Northern Ireland) 1948 |
| No. 102 | The Coal Supply (Temporary Provisions) Order (Northern Ireland) 1948 |
| No. 103 | The Training College Teachers' (Salaries and Allowances) Regulations (Northern Ireland) 1948 |
| No. 104 | The Ryegrass (Control of Harvesting) Order (Northern Ireland) 1948 |
| No. 105 | The Ryegrass Seed (Control) Order (Northern Ireland) 1948 |
| No. 106 | |
| No. 107 | The Shirtmaking Wages Council (Constitution) Order (Northern Ireland) 1948 |
| No. 108 | The Wholesale Mantle and Costume Wages Council (Constitution) Order (Northern Ireland) 1948 |
| No. 109 | The Sugar Confectionery and Food Preserving Wages Council (Constitution) Order (Northern Ireland) 1948 |
| No. 110 | The Boot and Shoe Repairing Wages Council (Constitution) Order (Northern Ireland) 1948 |
| No. 111 | |
| No. 112 | The Advisory Council for Education Regulations (Northern Ireland) 1948 |
| No. 113 | The Control of Building Operations Order (Northern Ireland) 1948 |
| No. 114 | The Utility Furniture (Supply and Acquisition) Order (Northern Ireland) 1948 |
| No. 115 | The Health Services (Constitution of the Northern Ireland Hospitals Authority) (No. 2) Order (Northern Ireland) 1948 |
| No. 116 | The Health Services (Constitution of the Northern Ireland General Health Services Board) (No. 2) Order (Northern Ireland) 1948 |
| No. 117 | The Health Services (Promissory Oaths) Regulations (Northern Ireland) 1948 |
| No. 118 | The Health Services (Travelling Expenses) Regulations (Northern Ireland) 1948 |
| No. 119 | The Probation Rules (Northern Ireland) 1948 |
| No. 120 | The Agricultural Development Loans (No. 3) Regulations (Northern Ireland) 1948 |
| No. 121 | The Bee Pest Prevention (Amendment) Regulations (Northern Ireland) 1948 |
| No. 122 | The Health Services (Supplementary Eye Services) (Qualifications) Regulations (Northern Ireland) 1948 |
| No. 123 | The County Court (Proceedings and Actions before the Registrar for Belfast) Rules (Northern Ireland) 1948 |
| No. 124 - 127 | |
| No. 128 | The Housing on Farms Regulations (Northern Ireland) 1948 |
| No. 129 | The National Insurance (Pensions, Existing Contributors) (Transitional) Regulations (Northern Ireland) 1948 |
| No. 130 | The Linen and Cotton Handkerchief and Household Goods and Linen Piece Goods Wages Council) Wages Regulations Order (Northern Ireland) 1948 |
| No. 131 | The State Exhibitions Regulations (Northern Ireland) 1948 |
| No. 132 | The Certificates of Births (Requisition) Regulations (Northern Ireland) 1948 |
| No. 133 | The Bessbrook and Newry Tramway (Abandonment) Order (Northern Ireland) 1948 |
| No. 134 | The Parliamentary Grants (Local Education Authorities) Regulations (Northern Ireland) 1948 |
| No. 135 | |
| No. 136 | The Baking Wages Council (Constitution) Order (Northern Ireland) 1948 |
| No. 137 | The Laundry Wages Council (Constitution) Order (Northern Ireland) 1948 |
| No. 138 | The Physical Training (Clothing) Regulations (Northern Ireland) 1948 |
| No. 139 | |
| No. 140 | The Public Service Vehicles and Goods Vehicles (Drivers' Hours of Duty) (Amendment) Regulations (Northern Ireland) 1948 |
| No. 141 | The Health Services (Transitional Arrangements) Regulations (Northern Ireland) 1948 |
| No. 142 | The Health Services (Facilitating of Commencement) Order (Northern Ireland) 1948 |
| No. 143 | The Health Services (General Scheme) Order (Northern Ireland) 1948 |
| No. 144 | The Health Services (Appointed Day) (No. 3) Order (Northern Ireland) 1948 |
| No. 145 | The Baking Wages Council Wages Regulations (Holidays) Order (Northern Ireland) 1948 |
| No. 146 | The Local Authorities (Planning Officers' Qualifications) Regulations (Northern Ireland) 1948 |
| No. 147 | The Health Services (General Medical and Pharmaceutical Services) Regulations (Northern Ireland) 1948 |
| No. 148 | The Paper Box Wages Council Wages Regulations (Holidays) Order (Northern Ireland) 1948 |
| No. 149 | The Bee Pest Prevention (Amendment) (No. 2) Regulations (Northern Ireland) 1948 |
| No. 150 | The Health Services (Transfer of Hospital Property and Liabilities) (Arbitration) Regulations (Northern Ireland) 1948 |
| No. 151 | The Factories Act (Northern Ireland) 1938 (Extension of Section 47) Regulations (Northern Ireland) 1948 |
| No. 152 | The Public Service Vehicles (Amendment) Regulations (Northern Ireland) 1948 |
| No. 153 | The Utility Furniture (Supply and Acquisition) (No. 2) Order (Northern Ireland) 1948 |
| No. 154 | The Motor Vehicles (International Circulation) Regulations (Northern Ireland) 1948 |
| No. 155 | |
| No. 156 | The Health Services (Hospitals - Exemption - Ulster Volunteer Force Hospitals) Order (Northern Ireland) 1948 |
| No. 157 | The Health Services (General Dental Services) Regulations (Northern Ireland) 1948 |
| No. 158 | The Intoxicating Liquor (Compensation Charges) Order (Northern Ireland) 1948 |
| No. 159 | The Health Services (Transfer of Officers) (No. 2) Regulations (Northern Ireland) 1948 |
| No. 160 | The Health Services (General Dental Services Fees) Regulations (Northern Ireland) 1948 |
| No. 161 | The Health Services (Superannuation) Regulations (Northern Ireland) 1948 |
| No. 162 | The National Insurance (Increase of Unemployment Benefit) Regulations (Northern Ireland) 1948 |
| No. 163 | The National Insurance (Verification of Births etc.) Regulations (Northern Ireland) 1948 |
| No. 164 | The Health Services (Services Committee) Regulations (Northern Ireland) 1948 |
| No. 165 | The Catering Establishments (Registration Certificates) Regulations (Northern Ireland) 1948 |
| No. 166 | The Health Services (Supplementary Eye Services) Regulations (Northern Ireland) 1948 |
| No. 167 | The Public Health and Local Government (Transfer of Functions) (No. 4) Order (Northern Ireland) 1948 |
| No. 168 | The Public Health and Local Government (Transfer of Functions) (No. 5) Order (Northern Ireland) 1948 |
| No. 169 | The Health Services (Charges for Accommodation and Services) (Hospitals) Regulations (Northern Ireland) 1948 |
| No. 170 | The Health Services (Medical Certificates) Regulations (Northern Ireland) 1948 |
| No. 171 | The Public Health and Local Government (Transfer of Functions) (No. 6) Order (Northern Ireland) 1948 |
| No. 172 | The Fire Services (Standard Fire Provision) (Western Fire Authority) (Amendment) Regulations (Northern Ireland) 1948 |
| No. 173 | The Public Health and Local Government (Transfer of Functions) (No. 7) Order (Northern Ireland) 1948 |
| No. 174 | The Public Health (Imported Food) (Amendment) Regulations (Northern Ireland) 1948 |
| No. 175 | The Health Services (Dispensary Property) Regulations (Northern Ireland) 1948 |
| No. 176 | The Housing (Owner Occupation) (Amendment) Regulations (Northern Ireland) 1948 |
| No. 177 | The Housing (Houses Built for Letting) (Amendment) Regulations (Northern Ireland) 1948 |
| No. 178 | The Public Health and Local Government (Administrative Provisions) (Appointed Day) Regulations (Northern Ireland) 1948 |
| No. 179 | The Housing (Grants) Order (Northern Ireland) 1948 |
| No. 180 | The Portadown and Banbridge Regional Waterworks Joint Board Order (Northern Ireland) 1948 |
| No. 181 | The Artificial Insemination (Cattle) Regulations (Northern Ireland) 1948 |
| No. 182 | The Health Authorities (Grants) Regulations (Northern Ireland) 1948 |
| No. 183 | The Factories Act (Northern Ireland) 1938 (Extension of Section 87) Regulations (Northern Ireland) 1948 |
| No. 184 | The Education (Evacuated Children) Act (End of Emergency) Order (Northern Ireland) 1948 |
| No. 185 | The National Insurance (Determination of Claims and Questions) Regulations (Northern Ireland) 1948 |
| No. 186 | The Health Services (Medical Certificates) (Amendment) Regulations (Northern Ireland) 1948 |
| No. 187 | The Public Health and Local Government (Abolition of Boards of Guardians) Order (Northern Ireland) 1948 |
| No. 188 - 191 | |
| No. 192 | The National Insurance (Modification of Teachers Pensions) Regulations (Northern Ireland) 1948 |
| No. 193 | The National Insurance (Industrial Injuries) (Great Britain Reciprocal Arrangements) Regulations (Northern Ireland) 1948 |
| No. 194 | The Health Services (Transfer and Apportionment of Superannuation Rights and Liabilities) Regulations (Northern Ireland) 1948 |
| No. 195 | The Health Services (Return of Hospital Endowments) (No. 2) Regulations (Northern Ireland) 1948 |
| No. 196 | The National Insurance (Claims and Payments) Regulations (Northern Ireland) 1948 |
| No. 197 | The Health Services (Constitution of the Northern Ireland Hospitals Authority) (No. 3) Order (Northern Ireland) 1948 |
| No. 198 | The National Insurance (Industrial Injuries) (Medical Certification) Regulations (Northern Ireland) 1948 |
| No. 199 | The National Insurance (Insurance Industry Special Scheme) Regulations (Northern Ireland) 1948 |
| No. 200 | The National Insurance (Transfer of Assets) Regulations (Northern Ireland) 1948 |
| No. 201 | |
| No. 202 | The Belfast Water Order (Northern Ireland) 1948 |
| No. 203 | |
| No. 204 | The National Insurance (Industrial Injuries) (Claims and Payments) Regulations (Northern Ireland) 1948 |
| No. 205 | The National Insurance (Industrial Injuries) (Mariners) Regulations (Northern Ireland) 1948 |
| No. 206 | The National Insurance (Industrial Injuries) (Airmen) Regulations (Northern Ireland) 1948 |
| No. 207 | The National Insurance (Residence Condition for Unemployment Benefit) Regulations (Northern Ireland) 1948 |
| No. 208 | The National Insurance (General Benefit) Regulations (Northern Ireland) 1948 |
| No. 209 | The National Insurance (Overlapping Benefits) Regulations (Northern Ireland) 1948 |
| No. 210 | The National Insurance (Residence and Persons Abroad) Regulations (Northern Ireland) 1948 |
| No. 211 | |
| No. 212 | The National Insurance (Industrial Injuries) (Prescribed Diseases) Regulations (Northern Ireland) 1948 |
| No. 213 | The National Assistance (Determination of Need) Regulations (Northern Ireland) 1948 |
| No. 214 | The National Assistance (Residence Condition for Assistance Grants) Regulations (Northern Ireland) 1948 |
| No. 215 | |
| No. 216 | The Civil Engineering Materials (Control) Order (Northern Ireland) 1948 |
| No. 217 | The National Insurance (Contributions) Regulations (Northern Ireland) 1948 |
| No. 218 | The National Insurance (Extension of Unemployment Benefit) Regulations (Northern Ireland) 1948 |
| No. 219 | The National Insurance (Share Fishermen) Regulations (Northern Ireland) 1948 |
| No. 220 | The National Insurance (Married Women) Regulations (Northern Ireland) 1948 |
| No. 221 | The National Insurance (New Entrants Transitional) Regulations (Northern Ireland) 1948 |
| No. 222 | The National Insurance (Classification) Regulations (Northern Ireland) 1948 |
| No. 223 | The Training Colleges (Scholarships) Regulations (Northern Ireland) 1948 |
| No. 224 | The Shirtmaking Wages Council Wages Regulations Order (Northern Ireland) 1948 |
| No. 225 | The Control of Employment Act (End of Emergency) Order (Northern Ireland) 1948 |
| No. 226 | The Societies (Miscellaneous Provisions) (End of Emergency) Order (Northern Ireland) 1948 |
| No. 227 | The Strabane Regional Waterworks Joint Board Order (Northern Ireland) 1948 |
| No. 228 | The National Insurance (Sickness Benefit, Maternity Benefit and Miscellaneous Provisions) (Transitional) Regulations (Northern Ireland) 1948 |
| No. 229 | The National Health Insurance (Central Fund) Emergency Regulations (Northern Ireland) 1948 |
| No. 230 | The National Insurance (Seamen's Special Fund) Regulations (Northern Ireland) 1948 |
| No. 231 | The National Insurance (Industrial Injuries) (Insurable and Excepted Employments) Regulations (Northern Ireland) 1948 |
| No. 232 | The Sea-Fishing Industry (Immature Sea-Fish) Order (Northern Ireland) 1948 |
| No. 233 | The National Insurance (Determination of Claims and Questions) (Transitional) Regulations (Northern Ireland) 1948 |
| No. 234 | The National Insurance (Airmen) Regulations (Northern Ireland) 1948 |
| No. 235 | The National Insurance (Guardians Allowances) Regulations (Northern Ireland) 1948 |
| No. 236 | The National Insurance (Mariners) Regulations (Northern Ireland) 1948 |
| No. 237 | The National Insurance (Unemployment Benefit) (Transitional) Regulations (Northern Ireland) 1948 |
| No. 238 | The National Insurance (Maternity Benefit) Regulations (Northern Ireland) 1948 |
| No. 239 | The National Insurance (General Transitional) Regulations (Northern Ireland) 1948 |
| No. 240 | The Readymade and Wholesale Bespoke Tailoring Wages Council Wages Regulations Order (Northern Ireland) 1948 |
| No. 241 | The Paper Box Wages Council Wages Regulations (Amendment) Order (Northern Ireland) 1948 |
| No. 242 | The Electoral (Register of Electors) (Amendment) Regulations (Northern Ireland) 1948 |
| No. 243 | The National Insurance (Approved Societies and Miscellaneous Provisions) Regulations (Northern Ireland) 1948 |
| No. 244 | The Mental Health (Transfer of Functions) Order (Northern Ireland) 1948 |
| No. 245 | The Mental Health (Appointed Day) Order (Northern Ireland) 1948 |
| No. 246 | The National Insurance (Widow's Benefit and Retirement Pensions) Regulations (Northern Ireland) 1948 |
| No. 247 | The National Assistance (Administration of Assistance) Regulations (Northern Ireland) 1948 |
| No. 248 | The National Insurance (Unemployment and Sickness Benefit) Regulations (Northern Ireland) 1948 |
| No. 249 | The National Insurance and Civil Service (Superannuation) (Schemes and Funds) Regulations (Northern Ireland) 1948 |
| No. 250 | The National Insurance and Industrial Injuries (Stamps) Regulations (Northern Ireland) 1948 |
| No. 251 | The National Assistance (Appeal Tribunals) Rules (Northern Ireland) 1948 |
| No. 252 | The Non-Contributory Old Age Pensions Regulations (Northern Ireland) 1948 |
| No. 253 | |
| No. 254 | The Electoral (Registration Expenses) Regulations (Northern Ireland) 1948 |
| No. 255 | The Health Services (Ancillary Services) (Hospitals) Regulations (Northern Ireland) 1948 |
| No. 256 | The National Insurance (Medical Certification) Regulations (Northern Ireland) 1948 |
| No. 257 | The Training Colleges (Grant Conditions) Regulations (Northern Ireland) 1948 |
| No. 258 | The National Insurance and Industrial Injuries (Collection of Contributions) Regulations (Northern Ireland) 1948 |
| No. 259 | The Electoral (Register of Electors) (Amendment No. 2) Regulations (Northern Ireland) 1948 |
| No. 260 | The Health Services (General Medical and Pharmaceutical Services) (Amendment) Regulations (Northern Ireland) 1948 |
| No. 261 | The Health Services (Medical Certificates) (No. 2) Regulations (Northern Ireland) 1948 |
| No. 262 | The Fire Services (Qualifications of Chief Officers and of Fire Officers) (Amendment) Regulations (Northern Ireland) 1948 |
| No. 263 | The National Insurance (Industrial Injuries) (Refund of Contributions) Regulations (Northern Ireland) 1948 |
| No. 264 | The Sheep Dipping (Special Regulations) Order (Northern Ireland) 1948 |
| No. 265 | The General Waste Materials Reclamation Wages Council (Constitution) Order (Northern Ireland) 1948 |
| No. 266 | |
| No. 267 | The Health Services (Supplementary Eye Services) (Qualifications) (Amendment) Regulations (Northern Ireland) 1948 |
| No. 268 | The Pigs Marketing Scheme (Amendment) Order (Northern Ireland) 1948 |
| No. 269 | The Ulster Transport Authority (Appointed Day) Order (Northern Ireland) 1948 |
| No. 270 | The Road Vehicles (Newcastle, County Down) Regulations (Northern Ireland) 1948 |
| No. 271 | The Sugar Confectionery and Food Preserving Wages Council Wages Regulations Order (Northern Ireland) 1948 |
| No. 272 | The Baking Wages Council Wages Regulations (No. 5) Order (Northern Ireland) 1948 |
| No. 273 | The Laundry Wages Council Wages Regulations (Amendment) Order (Northern Ireland) 1948 |
| No. 274 | The General Waste Materials Reclamation Wages Council Wages Regulations (No. 2) Order (Northern Ireland) 1948 |
| No. 275 | The Baking Wages Council Wages Regulations (No. 6) Order (Northern Ireland) 1948 |
| No. 276 | |
| No. 277 | The Factories (Forms and Particulars) Order (Northern Ireland) 1948 |
| No. 278 | The Baking Wages Council Wages Regulations (No. 8) Order (Northern Ireland) 1948 |
| No. 279 | The Baking Wages Council Wages Regulations (No. 7) Order (Northern Ireland) 1948 |
| No. 280 | The Training of Teachers (Courses) Regulations (Northern Ireland) 1948 |
| No. 281 | The Public Health and Local Government (Abolition of Boards of Guardians) (No. 2) Order (Northern Ireland) 1948 |
| No. 282 | The Building and Alteration Grants Regulations 1948 (Voluntary Schools - Primary, Intermediate and Special) (Northern Ireland) 1948 |
| No. 283 | The Building and Alteration and Equipment Grants (Voluntary Grammar Schools) Regulations (Northern Ireland) 1948 |
| No. 284 | The Marketing of Fruit (Amendment) (No. 2) Rules (Northern Ireland) 1948 |
| No. 285 | The Insurance - Order under Paragraph 3(1) of Part II of the Second Schedule to the Assurance Companies Act (Northern Ireland) 1948 |
| No. 286 | The Lloyds (Revocation of Rules) Regulations (Northern Ireland) 1948 |
| No. 287 | The Dressmaking and Women's Light Clothing Wages Council Wages Regulations (No. 1) Order (Northern Ireland) 1948 |
| No. 288 | The Dressmaking and Women's Light Clothing Wages Council Wages Regulations (No. 2) Order (Northern Ireland) 1948 |
| No. 289 | The Milk and Meals Regulations (Northern Ireland) 1948 |
| No. 290 | The Health Services (Tribunal) Regulations (Northern Ireland) 1948 |
| No. 291 | The Rope, Twine and Net Wages Council Wages Regulations Order (Northern Ireland) 1948 |
| No. 292 | The Rope, Twine and Net Wages Council Wages Regulations (Holidays) Order (Northern Ireland) 1948 |
| No. 293 | The Voluntary Grammar Schools Meals Grant Regulations (Northern Ireland) 1948 |
| No. 294 | The Health Services (Constitution of the Northern Ireland General Health Services Board) (No. 3) Order (Northern Ireland) 1948 |
| No. 295 | The Shipbuilding Special Regulations (Northern Ireland) 1948 |
| No. 296 | The Health Services (Facilitating of Commencement) (Amendment) Order (Northern Ireland) 1948 |
| No. 297 | The Mental Health (Appointed Day) (No. 2) Order (Northern Ireland) 1948 |
| No. 298 - 300 | |
| No. 301 | The Tillage General Order (Northern Ireland) 1948 |
| No. 302 | The Employers' Liability Insurance (Modification) Order (Northern Ireland) 1948 |
| No. 303 | The Mental Health (Transfer of Functions) (No. 2) Order (Northern Ireland) 1948 |
| No. 304 | The Civil Engineering Materials (Control) (No. 2) Order (Northern Ireland) 1948 |
| No. 305 | The Aerated Waters Wages Council Wages Regulations (No. 2) Order (Northern Ireland) 1948 |
| No. 306 | The Royal Ulster Constabulary (Women Members) Allowances (Amendment) Order (Northern Ireland) 1948 |
| No. 307 | The Royal Ulster Constabulary Allowances (Amendment) Order (Northern Ireland) 1948 |
| No. 308 | The Wholesale Mantle and Costume Wages Council Wages Regulations Order (Northern Ireland) 1948 |
| No. 309 | The Health Services (Prescribed Appliances) (Hospitals) Regulations (Northern Ireland) 1948 |
| No. 310 | The Health Services (Charges for Appliances) (Hospitals) Regulations (Northern Ireland) 1948 |
| No. 311 | The Health Services (Travelling Expenses of Patients) (Hospital and Specialist Services) Regulations (Northern Ireland) 1948 |
| No. 312 | |
| No. 313 | The National Insurance (Unemployment Benefit) (Transitional) Amendment Regulations (Northern Ireland) 1948 |
| No. 314 | The Malone Training School (Contributions) Regulations (Northern Ireland) 1948 |
| No. 315 | The South Armagh Regional Waterworks Joint Board Order (Northern Ireland) 1948 |
| No. 316 | The Housing Subsidy Order (Northern Ireland) 1948 |
| No. 317 | The Road Vehicles (Registration and Licensing) (Amendment) Regulations (Northern Ireland) 1948 |
| No. 318 | |
| No. 319 | The Mental Health (Appointed Day) (No. 3) Order (Northern Ireland) 1948 |
| No. 320 | The Intermediate School (Grant Conditions) Amendment Regulations (Northern Ireland) 1948 |
| No. 321 | The Training College Teachers' (Salaries and Allowances) (Amendment) Regulations (Northern Ireland) 1948 |
| No. 322 | The Mental Health (No. 1) Regulations (Northern Ireland) 1948 |
| No. 323 | The Public Health (Prevention of Contamination of Food) Regulations (Northern Ireland) 1948 |
| No. 324 | The Public Health (Infectious Diseases) Regulations (Northern Ireland) 1948 |
| No. 325 | The Summons and Process Servers' Fees Order (Northern Ireland) 1948 |
| No. 326 | The Public Health and Local Government (Transfer of Functions) (No. 8) Order (Northern Ireland) 1948 |
| No. 327 | The Mental Health (No. 2) Regulations (Northern Ireland) 1948 |
| No. 328 | The Bacon Industry (Pig Husbandry Research Grant) Order (Northern Ireland) 1948 |
| No. 329 | The School Health Service Regulations (Northern Ireland) 1948 |
| No. 330 | The Registration of Marriages in Northern Ireland (Registrars' Districts of Enniskillen and Irvinestown) Order (Northern Ireland) 1948 |
| No. 331 | The Grammar Schools (Admissions and Scholarships) (Amendment) Regulations (Northern Ireland) 1948 |
| No. 332 | The Health Services General Scheme (Modification) Regulations (Northern Ireland) 1948 |
| No. 333 | The Public Health and Local Government (Transfer of Functions) (No. 6) (Amendment) Order (Northern Ireland) 1948 |
| No. 334 | The Fire Services (Belfast Fire District and Fire Authority) Order (Northern Ireland) 1948 |
| No. 335 | The Fire Services (Northern Fire District and Fire Authority) (Amendment) Order (Northern Ireland) 1948 |
| No. 336 | The Fire Services (Southern Fire District and Fire Authority) (Amendment) Order (Northern Ireland) 1948 |
| No. 337 | The Family Allowances (New Zealand Reciprocal Arrangements) Regulations (Northern Ireland) 1948 |
| No. 338 | The Superannuation (War Service) Regulations (Northern Ireland) 1948 |
| No. 339 | The Superannuation (War-time Interruption of Service) Regulations (Northern Ireland) 1948 |
| No. 340 | The National Insurance (Overlapping Benefits) Amendment Regulations (Northern Ireland) 1948 |
| No. 341 | The Electricity (Transfer of Undertakings) Order (Northern Ireland) 1948 |
| No. 342 | The Electricity (Appointed Day) Order (Northern Ireland) 1948 |
| No. 343 | The Motor Cars (Use and Construction) (Amendment) Regulations (Northern Ireland) 1948 |
| No. 344 | The National Insurance (Industrial Injuries) (Benefit) Amendment Regulations (Northern Ireland) 1948 |
| No. 345 | The Baking Wages Council Wages Regulations (Amendment) (No. 4) Order (Northern Ireland) 1948 |
| No. 346 | The Baking Wages Council Wages Regulations (Amendment) (No. 5) Order (Northern Ireland) 1948 |
| No. 347 | The Baking Wages Council Wages Regulations (Amendment) (No. 6) Order (Northern Ireland) 1948 |
| No. 348 | The Baking Wages Council Wages Regulations (Amendment) (No. 7) Order (Northern Ireland) 1948 |
| No. 349 | The Superannuation (Definition of War Period) Order (Northern Ireland) 1948 |
| No. 350 | The National Insurance and Civil Service (Superannuation) Regulations (Northern Ireland) 1948 |
| No. 351 | The National Insurance (Compensation) Regulations (Northern Ireland) 1948 |

== See also ==
- List of statutory rules of Northern Ireland
