= Local Government (Boundaries) Act (Northern Ireland) 1971 =

Act of the Parliament of Northern Ireland

Local Government (Boundaries) Act (Northern Ireland) 1971 (Note: Section 7.)
- Act of Parliament
- Parliament of Northern Ireland
- Long title: An Act to provide that Northern Ireland shall be divided into twenty-six local government districts and that each of those districts shall be divided into wards; to appoint a Commissioner to make recommendations regarding the boundaries and names of those districts and wards and the number of wards in each district; and for purposes connected therewith.
- Citation: 1971 c. 9 (N.I.)
- Territorial extent: Northern Ireland

Dates
- Royal assent: 23 March 1971
- Repealed: 1 April 2015
Other legislation
Amended by	Northern Ireland Assembly Disqualification Act 1975
Repealed by	Local Government (Boundaries) Act (Northern Ireland) 2008
Relates to	Local Government Act (Northern Ireland) 1972; Statute Law Revision (Northern Ireland) Act 1980; Local Government (Boundaries) (Northern Ireland) Order 2006

Status: Repealed

Revised text of statute as amended

The Local Government (Boundaries) Act (Northern Ireland) 1971 (c. 9 (N.I.)) was an act of the Parliament of Northern Ireland, passed in 1971 to replace the previous system of local authorities established by the Local Government (Ireland) Act 1898. The system was based on the recommendations of the Macrory Report, of June 1970, which presupposed the continued existence of the Government of Northern Ireland to act as a regional-level authority.

Northern Ireland was to be divided into twenty-six local government districts, each consisting of a number of wards. The act did not define the Districts exactly, but provided a list of 26 existing local government areas which would form the basis of the pattern. It then gave the Governor of Northern Ireland the power to appoint a Local Government Boundaries Commissioner.

The commissioner's proposals were put into effect by the Local Government (Boundaries) Order (Northern Ireland) 1972 (SR&O(NI) 1972/131), dated 17 July 1972.

The 1971 act created districts, but did not make provision for councils to govern them. This was done by the Local Government Act (Northern Ireland) 1972 (c. 9 (N.I.)). The councils created by the latter act came into existence on 1 October 1973.

== Local government districts and wards ==
The following list shows the original names of the twenty-six local government districts. A number later changed their name or gained borough or city status under the Local Government Act (Northern Ireland) 1972. Also shown are the wards into which each local government district was divided. While the Local Government (Northern Ireland) Act 1972 stated, "It shall be taken that each ward shall return one member to the council of the district in which it is situated", by the time the first elections were held on 30 May 1973, a system of proportional representation using multi-member district electoral areas had been introduced. The electoral areas consisted of groupings of between four and eight wards, with a number of councillors being elected for each area equal to the number of wards. The wards were subsequently used as building blocks for other units such as constituencies, and census statistics have been compiled for them.

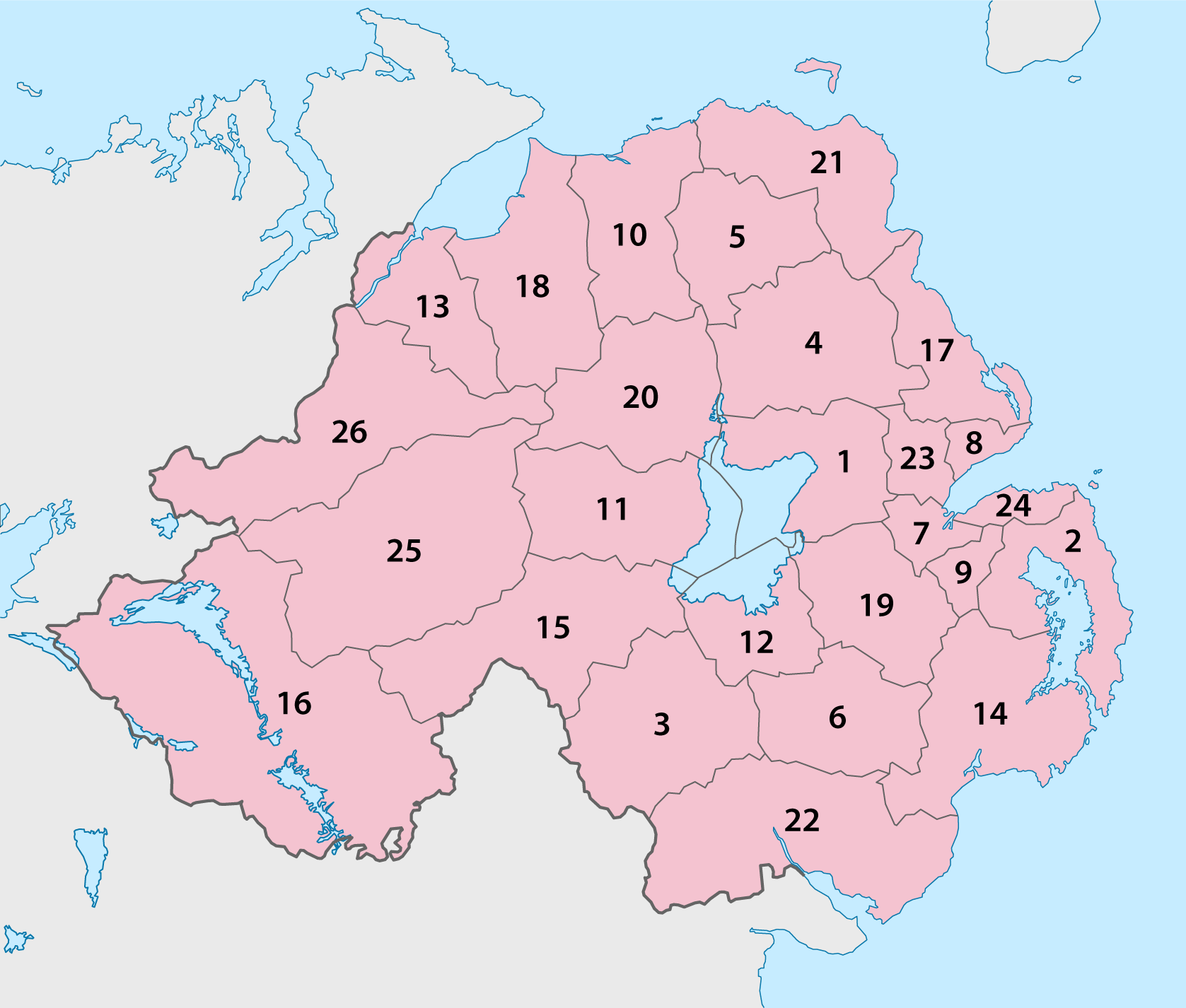
Northern Ireland local government districts

1. Antrim
2. Ards
3. Armagh
4. Ballymena
5. Ballymoney
6. Banbridge
7. Belfast
8. Carrickfergus
9. Castlereagh
10. Coleraine
11. Cookstown
12. Craigavon
13. Londonderry
14. Down
15. Dungannon
16. Fermanagh
17. Larne
18. Limavady
19. Lisburn
20. Magherafelt
21. Moyle
22. Newry and Mourne
23. Newtownabbey
24. North Down
25. Omagh
26. Strabane

Existing area named in Act	District Name	No. of Wards	Names of Wards
Antrim urban district electoral division	Antrim	15	Aldergrove, Balloo, Ballycraigy, Ballyrobin, Cranfield, Crumlin, Drumanaway, Massereene, Parkgate, Parkhall, Randalstown, Stiles, Tardree, Templepatrick, Toome
Armagh urban district	Armagh	20	Ballymartrim, Carrigatuke, Charlemont, Demesne, Derrynoose, Downs, Hockley, Keady, Killeen, Killylea, Laurelvale, Lisanally, Loughgall, Lurgyvallen, The Mall, Markethill, Milford, Poyntz Pass, Richhill, Tandragee
Ballycastle urban district	Moyle	16	Armoy, Ballintoy, Ballylough, Bushmills, Carnmoon, Dalriada, Dunseverick, Glenaan, Glenariff, Glendun, Glenshesk, Kinbane, Knocklayd, Moss-side, Quay, Rathlin
Ballymena borough	Ballymena	21	Ahoghill, Ballee, Ballykeel, Ballyloughan, Broughshane, Galgorm, Castle Demesne, Craigywarren, Cullybackey, Dunclug, Dunminning, Fair Green, Glenravel, Glenwhirry, Grange, Harryville, Kells, Park, Portglenone, Slemish, Waveney
Ballymoney urban district	Ballymoney	16	Ballyhoe and Corkey, Benvardin, Castlequarter, Clogh Mills, Dervock, Dunloy, Fairhill, The Hills, Killoquin Lower, Killoquin Upper, Kilraghts, Newhill, Seacon, Stranocum, Town Parks, The Vow
Banbridge urban district	Banbridge	15	Annaclone, Ballydown, Ballyoolymore, Central, Croob, Dromore, Drumadonnell, Edenderry, Garran, Gilford, Lawrencetown, Loughbrickland, Quilly, Seapatrick, Skeagh
Bangor borough	North Down	20	Ballyholme, Ballymagee, Bangor Castle, Bangor Harbour, Bryansburn, Churchill, Clandeboye, Conlig, Craigavad, Crawfordsburn, Cultra, Groomsport, Holywood Demesne, Holywood Priory, Loughview, Princetown, Rathgael, Silverstream, Springhill, Whitehill
Belfast county borough	Belfast	51	Andersonstown, Ardoyne, Ballygomartin, Ballyhackamore, Ballymacarret, Ballynafeigh, Ballysillan, Bellevue, Belmont, Bloomfield, Cavehill, Castleview, Central, Cliftonville, Clonard, Court, Cromac, Crumlin, Donegall, Duncairn, Falls, Finaghy, Fortwilliam, Grosvenor, Grove, Highfield, Island, Ladybrook, Legoniel, Malone, Milltown, The Mount, New Lodge, North Howard, Orangefield, Ormeau, Rosetta, St. George's, St. James, Shandon, Shankill, Stormont, Stranmillis, Suffolk, Sydenham, University, Upper Malone, Whiterock, Willowfield, Windsor, Woodvale
Carrickfergus borough	Carrickfergus	15	Blackhead, Boneybefore, Castle, Clipperstown, Eden, Knockagh, Love Lane, Lower Greenisland, Middle Greenisland, Northland, Sunnylands, Trooperslane, Victoria, Whitehead, Woodburn
Castlereagh district electoral division	Castlereagh	19	Ballyhanwood, Beechill, Carrowreagh, Cregagh, Carryduff, Downshire, Dundonald, Enler, Four Winds, Gilnahirk, Hillfoot, Lisnasharragh, Lower Braniel, Minnowburn, Moneyreagh, Newtownbreda, Tullycarnet, Upper Braniel, Wynchurch
Coleraine borough	Coleraine	20	Agivey, Ballywillin, Castlerock, Central, Churchland, Cross Glebe, The Cuts, Dhu Varren, Dunluce, Garvagh, Kilrea, Knockantern, Macosquin, Mount Sandel, Portrush, Portstewart, Ringsend, Strand, University, Waterside
Cookstown urban district	Cookstown	15	Ardboe, Coagh, Dunamore, Gortalowry, Killycoply, Lissan, The Loop, Moneymore, Newbuildings, Oaklands, Old Town, Pomeroy, Sandholes, Stewartstown, Tullagh
Craigavon urban district	Craigavon	25	Aghagallon, Annagh, Bachelors Walk, Belle Vue, The Birches, Bleary, Breagh, Brownlow, Brownstown, Church, Court, Edgarstown, Hartfield, Kernan, Killycomain, Kinnegoe, Knocknashane, Magheralin, Mourneview, Parklake, Taghnevan, Tavanagh, Waringstown, Woodside, Woodville
Downpatrick urban district	Down	20	Ardglass, Audley's Acre, Ballymaglave, Castlewellan, Cathedral, Crossgar, Derryboy, Donard, Dundrum, Dunmore, Killough, Killyleagh, Kilmore, Market, Quoile, Saintfield, Seaforde, Shimna, Strangford, Tollymore
Dungannon urban district	Dungannon	20	Altmore, Augher, Aughnacloy, Ballygawley, Benburb, Caledon, Castlecaulfield, Clogher, Coalisland North, Coalisland South, Donaghmore, Drumglass, Fivemiletown, Killymaddy, Killyman, Killymeal, Lisnahull, Moy, Moygashel, Washing Bay
Enniskillen borough	Fermanagh	20	Ballinamallard, Belcoo and Belmore, Belleek and Boa, Brookeborough, Castlecoole, Derrygonnelly, Derrylin, Devenish, Erne, Florencecourt and Kinawley, Garrison, Irvinestown, Kesh Ederny and Lack, Lisbellaw, Lisnaskea, Maguire's Bridge, Newtownbutler, Rosslea, Rossorry, Tempo
Larne borough	Larne	15	Antiville, Ballycarry, Ballyloran, Blackcave, Carncastle, Carnlough, Central, Craigy Hill, Gardenmore, Glenarm, Glynn, Harbour, Island Magee, Kilwaughter, Town Parks
Limavady urban district	Limavady	15	Aghanloo, Binevenagh, Coolessan, Dungiven, Feeny, Forest, Glack, Gresteel, The Highlands, Magilligan, Myroe, Rathbrady, Roeside, Upper Glenshane, Walworth
Lisburn borough	Lisburn	23	Ballymacbrennan, Blaris, Collin, Derryaghy, Dromara, Drumbo, Dunmurry, Glenavy, Hilden, Hillhall, Hillsborough, Knockmore, Lagan Valley, Lambeg, Lisnagarvey, Magheragall, Magheralave, Maze, Moira, Old Warren, Seymour Hill, Tonagh, Tullyrusk
Londonderry county borough	Londonderry	27	Altnagelvin, Banagher, Beechwood, Brandywell, Caw, Claudy, Clondermot, Creggan Central, Creggan South, Crevagh, Culmore, The Diamond, Ebrington, Eglinton, Enagh, Faughan, Pennyburn, Prehen, Riverside, Rosemount, St. Columb's, Shantallow, Springtown, Strand, Victoria, Waterloo, Wells, Westland
Magherafelt district electoral division	Magherafelt	15	Ballymaguigan, Bellaghy, Castledawson, Draperstown, Gulladuff, Knockloughrim, Lecumpher, Lower Glenshane, Maghera, Swatragh, Tobermore, Town Parks East, Town Parks West, Upperlands, Valley
Newry urban district	Newry and Mourne	30	Annalong, Ballybot, Ballycrossan, Belleek, Bessbrook, Binnian, Camlough, Clonallan, Cranfield, Creggan, Crossmaglen, Daisy Hill, Derrymore, Donaghmore, Drumalane, Drumgath, Drumgullion, Fathom, Forkhill, Kilkeel, Lisnacree, Mourne, Newtownhamilton, Rathfriland, Rostrevor, St. Mary's, St. Patrick's, Seaview, Spelga, Tullyhappy, Windsor Hill
Newtownabbey urban district	Newtownabbey	21	Ballyclare, Ballyeaston, Ballyhenry, Ballynure, Bradan, Carnmoney, Cloughfern, Coole, Doagh, Dunanney, Glengormley, Hopefield, Jordanstown, Mallusk, Monkstown, Mossgrove, Mossley, Rostulla, Whiteabbey, Whitehouse, Whitewell
Newtownards borough	Ards	17	Ballyhalbert, Ballygowan, Carrowdore, Central, Comber North, Comber South, Donaghadee North, Donaghadee South, Glen, Greyabbey, Killinchy, Kircubbin, Loughries, Movilla, Portaferry, Scrabo, Ulsterville
Omagh urban district	Omagh	20	Beragh, Carrickmore, Clanabogan, Dergmoney, Dromore, Drumquin, Drumnakilly, Drumragh, East, Fairgreen, Fairy Water, Fintona, Gortin, Killyclogher, Newtownsaville, Owenglen, Sixmilecross, Strule, Trillick, West
Strabane urban district	Strabane	20	Artigarvan, Castlederg, Clare, Dunnamanagh, East, Finn, Glenderg, Newtownstewart, North, Plumbridge, Sion Mills, Slievekirk, South, Victoria Bridge, West

† Craigavon Urban District replaced Lurgan Rural District in 1967.

== Changes and repeal ==
The areas established by the act were reviewed on a number of occasions: in 1985 the number of wards was increased from 524 to 562. In 1993 the number of wards was again increased to 582, and in 1993 the ward of Rathfriland was transferred from Newry and Mourne to Banbridge district. There were also minor boundary changes, such as the transfer of rural parts of Legoniel from Belfast to Antrim in 1985.

In 1984 the name of the local government district, as distinct from the city, was changed to Derry, and in 1999 Dungannon District was renamed Dungannon and South Tyrone.

The act was repealed by the Local Government (Boundaries) Act (Northern Ireland) 2008.
