= Water Office, Belfast =

Warehouse in Belfast, Northern Ireland

Coordinates: 54.5976°N 5.9291°W

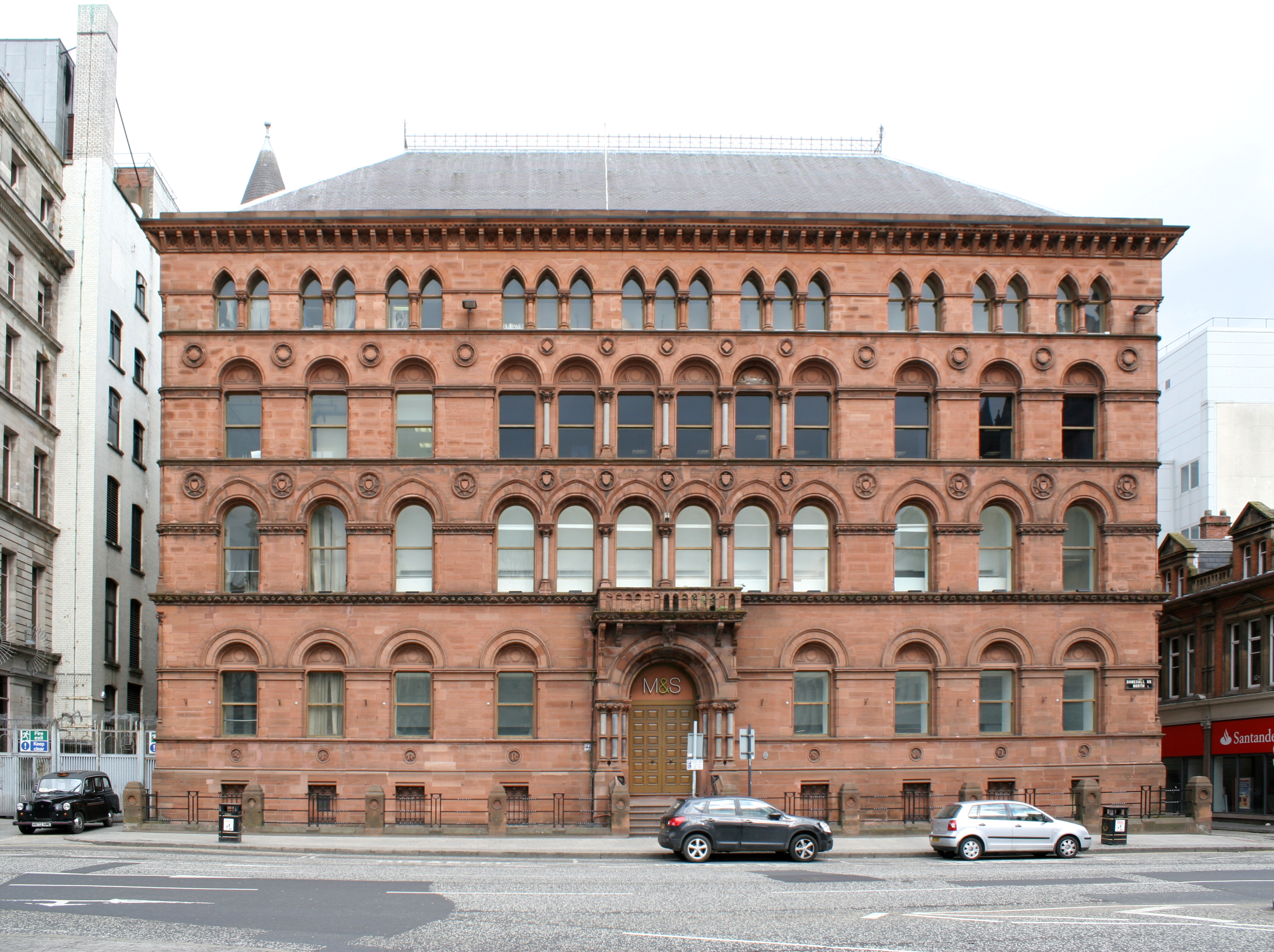
Water Office, 1 Donegall Square, Belfast

The Water Office is a former warehouse at 1 Donegall Square in Belfast, Northern Ireland, that is listed by the Department for Communities (DfC), part of the Northern Ireland Executive, at grade B1, citing both "Historic Interest" and "Architectural Interest".

== History ==
It was built between 1860 and 1879 in an Italian Gothic style to the designs of William H. Lynn for Richardson Sons and Owden, linen merchants. It became the offices of the Belfast City and District Water Commissioners in the late 1930s. It was badly damaged by German bombing during the Second World War and was refurbished by Marks & Spencer in the 1980s, which continues to occupy the building.
