= Local Government Act (Northern Ireland) 1972 =

Act of the Parliament of Northern Ireland

Local Government (Northern Ireland) Act 1972 (Note: Section 150(1).)
- Act of Parliament
- Parliament of Northern Ireland
- Long title: An Act to provide for the constitution of district councils to administer local government districts, for the regulation of such councils and for certain of their functions; to abolish existing local government areas and existing local authorities, with certain exceptions, and to enable provision to be made for the transfer of the functions, assets and liabilities of such authorities; and for connected purposes.
- Citation: 1972 c. 9 (N.I.)
- Territorial extent: Northern Ireland

Dates
- Royal assent: 25 March 1972
- Commencement: (Note: Section 150(2).)
Other legislation
Amended by	Defamation Act 1996; Northern Ireland Assembly Disqualification Act 1975; Statute Law Revision (Northern Ireland) Act 1980; Elected Authorities (Northern Ireland) Act 1989; Law Reform (Miscellaneous Provisions) (Northern Ireland) Order 2005; Elections Act 2022
Relates to	Public Health (Ireland) Act 1878; Water Supplies and Sewerage Act (Northern Ireland) 1945; New Towns Acts (Northern Ireland); Local Government (Boundaries) Act (Northern Ireland) 1971; Local Government (Boundaries) (Northern Ireland) Order 2006

Status: Amended

Text of statute as originally enacted

Revised text of statute as amended

Text of the Local Government Act (Northern Ireland) 1972 as in force today (including any amendments) within the United Kingdom, from legislation.gov.uk.

The Local Government (Northern Ireland) Act 1972 (c. 9 (N.I.)) was an act of the Parliament of Northern Ireland that constituted district councils to administer the twenty-six local government districts created by the Local Government (Boundaries) Act (Northern Ireland) 1971, and abolished the existing local authorities in Northern Ireland.

== Provisions ==
The act significantly reduced the remit and "status" of local government in Northern Ireland. The act disqualifies a person from standing for election if they have any paid office with a council.

=== District councils ===
Each local government district was to have a district council consisting of elected councillors of whom one would be chairman and another could be vice-chairman.

Provision for the continuation of city and borough status was included in the act, which provided that the charter of each county borough should apply to the new district containing it, and that the council for a district which includes the whole or the major part of a borough other than a county borough may... resolve that the charter of the corporation of the borough shall have effect in relation to the district. In addition a district council could apply for a new charter making it a borough. In the original act, the council could petition the Governor of Northern Ireland for a royal charter. By the time the act came into effect, however, the office of governor had been abolished, and petitions were addressed to the Secretary of State for Northern Ireland. Where a district was designated a city or borough, the chairman and vice-chairman became the mayor and deputy-mayor. In the case of Belfast, the chairman's title continued to be lord mayor.

Name of District	Status of Council
Antrim	District council. Granted borough status 9 May 1977.
Ards	Borough council (under 1927 charter of Newtownards).
Armagh	District council. Following grant of city status in 1994, renamed Armagh City and District Council 1 October 1995.
Ballymena	Borough council (under 1937 charter).
Ballymoney	District council. Granted borough status 18 February 1977.
Banbridge	District council.
Belfast	City council under charter of 1619 and letters patent of 1888.
Carrickfergus	Borough council (under 1939 charter).
Castlereagh	District council. Granted borough status 22 March 1977.
Coleraine	Borough council (under 1928 charter).
Cookstown	District council.
Craigavon	Borough council (under 1949 charter of Lurgan).
Down	District council.
Dungannon – renamed Dungannon and South Tyrone 25 November 1999	District council. Granted borough status 1999.
Fermanagh	District council.
Larne	Borough council (under 1938 charter).
Limavady	District council. Granted borough status 1 March 1989.
Lisburn	Borough council (under 1964 charter). Granted city status 2002.
Londonderry – renamed Derry 7 May 1984.	City council (under 1613 charter).
Magherafelt	District council.
Moyle	District council.
Newry and Mourne	District council.
Newtownabbey	District council. Granted borough status 18 February 1977.
North Down	Borough council (under 1927 charter of Bangor).
Omagh	District council.
Strabane	District council.

=== Abolition of existing local authorities ===
Section 131 of the act stated that every county and every county borough shall cease to be an administrative area for local government purposes, and that every borough (other than a county borough), every urban district and every rural district shall be abolished.

Also abolished were any joint boards established under the Public Health (Ireland) Act 1878 or Water Supplies and Sewerage Act (Northern Ireland) 1945 and the Belfast City and District Water Commissioners.

Exempted from abolition were the corporations of the county boroughs of Belfast and Londonderry, and of any municipal borough whose charter had been adopted by the new district council. In these cases the district council was to become the corporation from 1 October 1973.

The act also provided for the dissolution of new town commissions established under the New Towns Acts (Northern Ireland) 1965 to 1968.

The composition of the new districts was as follows:

New local authority (1973–2015)	Former local authorities
Antrim (County Antrim)	Antrim Rural District (most), Ballymena Rural District (part)
Ards (County Down)	Donaghadee Urban District, East Down Rural District (part), Newtownards Borough, North Downs Rural District (most)
Armagh (County Armagh)	Armagh Rural District (most), Armagh Urban District, Keady Urban District, Newry No. 2 Rural District (part), Tandragee Rural District (most), Tandragee Urban District
Ballymena (County Antrim)	Antrim Rural District (part), Ballymena Borough, Ballymena Rural District (most)
Ballymoney (County Antrim)	Ballymoney Rural District (most), Ballymoney Urban District, Ballymena Rural District (part)
Belfast (Counties Antrim & Down)	from County Antrim: Antrim Rural District (part), Lisburn Rural District (part), Newtownabbey Urban District (most); from County Down: Castlereagh Rural District (part), Hillsborough Rural District (part); from both counties: Belfast County Borough
Carrickfergus (County Antrim)	Carrickfergus Borough, Larne Rural District (part), Whitehead Urban District
Castlereagh (County Down)	Castlereagh Rural District (part), Hillsborough Rural District (part), North Down Rural District (part)
Coleraine (Counties Londonderry & Antrim)	from County Londonderry: Coleraine Borough, Coleraine Rural District (most), Portstewart Urban District; from County Antrim: Ballymoney Rural District (part), Portrush Urban District
Cookstown (Counties Tyrone and Londonderry)	from County Tyrone: Cookstown Rural District (part), Cookstown Urban District; from County Londonderry: Magherafelt Rural District (part)
Craigavon (Counties Armagh, Down & Antrim)	from County Armagh: Armagh Rural District (part), Lurgan Borough, Craigavon Urban District,§ Portadown Borough, Tandragee Rural District (part); from County Down: Moira Rural District (most); from County Antrim: Lisburn Rural District (part)
Derry (County Londonderry)	Limavady Rural District (part), Londonderry County Borough†, Londonderry Rural District† (most)
Down (County Down)	Downpatrick Urban District, East Down Rural District (most), Hillsborough Rural District (part), Newcastle Urban District, North Down Rural District (part), South Down Rural District (part)
Dungannon and South Tyrone (Counties Tyrone & Armagh)	from County Tyrone: Clogher Rural District (most), Dungannon Rural District, Dungannon Urban District; from County Armagh: Armagh Rural District (part)
Fermanagh (Counties Fermanagh & Tyrone)	from County Fermanagh: whole county‡ (until 1968 divided into: Enniskillen Rural District, Enniskillen Urban District, Irvinestown Rural District, Lisnakea Rural District); from County Tyrone: Omagh Rural District (part)
Larne (County Antrim)	Larne Borough, Larne Rural District (most)
Limavady (County Londonderry)	Limavady Rural District (most), Limavady Urban District, Londonderry Rural District† (part)
Lisburn (Counties Antrim & Down)	from County Antrim: Antrim Rural District (part), Lisburn Rural District (most); from County Down: Hillsborough Rural District (most), Moira Rural District (part); from both counties: Lisburn Borough
Magherafelt (County Londonderry)	Coleraine Rural District (part), Magherafelt Rural District (most)
Moyle (County Antrim)	Ballycastle Rural District, Ballycastle Borough, Ballymoney Rural District (part), Larne Rural District (part)
Newry and Mourne (Counties Down & Armagh)	from County Down: Kilkeel Urban District, Newry No. 1 Rural District (most), South Down Rural District (most), Warrenpoint Urban District; from County Armagh: Newry No. 2 Rural District (most); from both counties: Newry Urban District
Newtownabbey (County Antrim)	Antrim Rural District (part), Ballyclare Urban District, Larne Rural District (part), Newtownabbey Urban District (part)
North Down (County Down)	Bangor Borough, Castlereagh Rural District (part), Holywood Urban District, North Down Rural District (part)
Omagh (County Tyrone)	Castlederg Rural District (part), Clogher Rural District (part), Omagh Rural District (most), Omagh Urban District
Strabane (County Tyrone)	Castlederg Rural District (most), Omagh Rural District (part), Strabane Rural District, Strabane Urban District

† In 1969, both Londonderry Corporation (the county borough council) and Londonderry Rural District Council were abolished. Their functions were transferred to the Londonderry Development Commission, established to provide new housing and infrastructure in and around Derry.

‡ All district councils in Fermanagh were abolished in 1968, creating a unitary county council.

§ Craigavon Urban District replaced Lurgan Rural District in 1967.

=== Staff commission ===
Section 40 of the Act established the Staff Commission of Northern Ireland to oversee the recruitment, training and terms and conditions of employment of council officers, and those of the Northern Ireland Housing Executive.

The commission was to:

- Establish advisory appointment panels to advise councils on the suitability of applicants for appointment as officers
- Draw up a code of conduct to ensure fair and equal consideration of all applications for employment
- Monitor fair employment procedures in councils
- Assess future requirements of councils for officers, and publicise the opportunities for such employment to the public.
- Promote cooperation between councils
- Assist development of training for local government officers
- Assist with the negotiation of procedures for standard rates of remuneration, or other terms and conditions of employment
