= Audleystown Court Tomb =

Court cairn in Northern Ireland

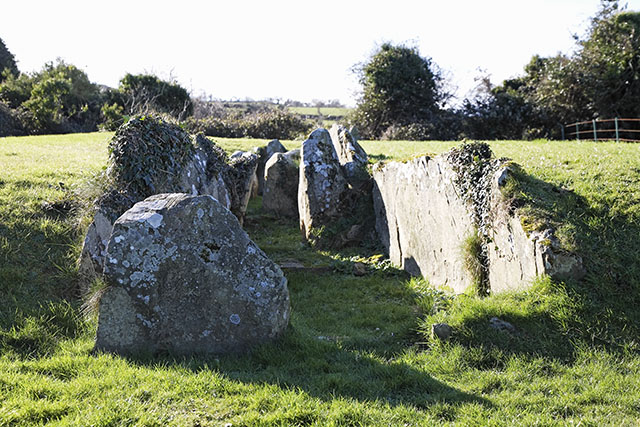
- The tomb in 2006
- Interactive map of Audleystown Court Tomb
- 54.37781°N 5.59698°W
- Type: Court tomb
- Location: County Down, Northern Ireland

History
- Built: c. 3900–3500 BCE

Site notes
- Material: Stone

The Audleystown Court Tomb is a Neolithic dual court tomb located in Ballyculter parish, near the southern shore of Strangford Lough in County Down, Northern Ireland. The tomb was built around 3900–3500 BCE. It was first excavated by archaeologist A.E. Collins in 1952. The Audleystown court tomb has a double courtyard-double burial chamber layout, which is unique to Ireland.

== History of court tombs ==
Court-tombs are among the earliest megalithic monuments to be built in Ireland and Scotland. During the period 3900–3500 BCE, more than 390 court cairns were constructed in Ireland and over 100 in southwest Scotland. The Neolithic monuments are identified by an uncovered courtyard connected to one or more roofed and partitioned burial chambers. Court tombs were possibly built in multiple phases and later re-used in the Early Bronze Age. Courts were built in a variety of shapes, with oval or circular forms predominating.

== Description ==
Audleystown court tomb is a dual-court tomb, with a layout which is unique to Ireland. Court tombs typically have a single courtyard and one gallery of compartmentalized burial areas, which are usually located at the wide end of the cairn. In dual-court tombs a court and a gallery are placed at each end of the cairn, as in Audleystown and Cohaw. In 1952, as part of the Archaeological Survey of Northern Ireland, A.E.P ('Pat') Collins, conducted the first archeological excavation of the Audleystown tomb and published his findings in 1954. The Ministry of Finance assumed guardianship of the site and declared it an ancient monument. After the 1952 excavation, the burial galleries were filled with sand to protect the monument.

The archaeological survey determined that the court tomb encompasses a double open courtyard, two burial chambers and a trapezoid shaped cairn. The monument is orientated northeast–southwest, with the wider end facing southwest. It is faced with a drystone wall of standing shale stones, which were covered originally by shale and earth. Each open court area is connected to a gallery with equal-sized burial chambers. From October, 1956 to May, 1957, further excavations was conducted at the site, supervised by Collins.

The remains of 34 people were found in the burial chambers. They were a combination of cremated, partially-burnt and unburnt bones. Two thirds of the bones were unburnt and defleshed which is unusual. The remains were primarily of women and children and were of disarticulated bones along with some animal bones. Pottery sherds and worked flint were also found at the site. The pottery remnants included pieces of at least three bowls made with a smooth, corky fabric and a few pieces of Carrowkeel ware.

In 1958, a project to preserve the walls of the cairn was undertaken by a group led by Collins. The courtyard areas were taken down to their original ground levels. A search in nearby fields located large Silurian slabs that were previously robbed from the cairn. They were placed back in the cairn in their original positions and missing standing stones from the galleries were replaced with similarly sized stones. Where no suitable stones were available, the walls were repaired with a combination of drystone and concrete. The cairn was rebuilt up to what was determined to be its original height with a combination of stones and earth from the site.

Audleystown Court Tomb

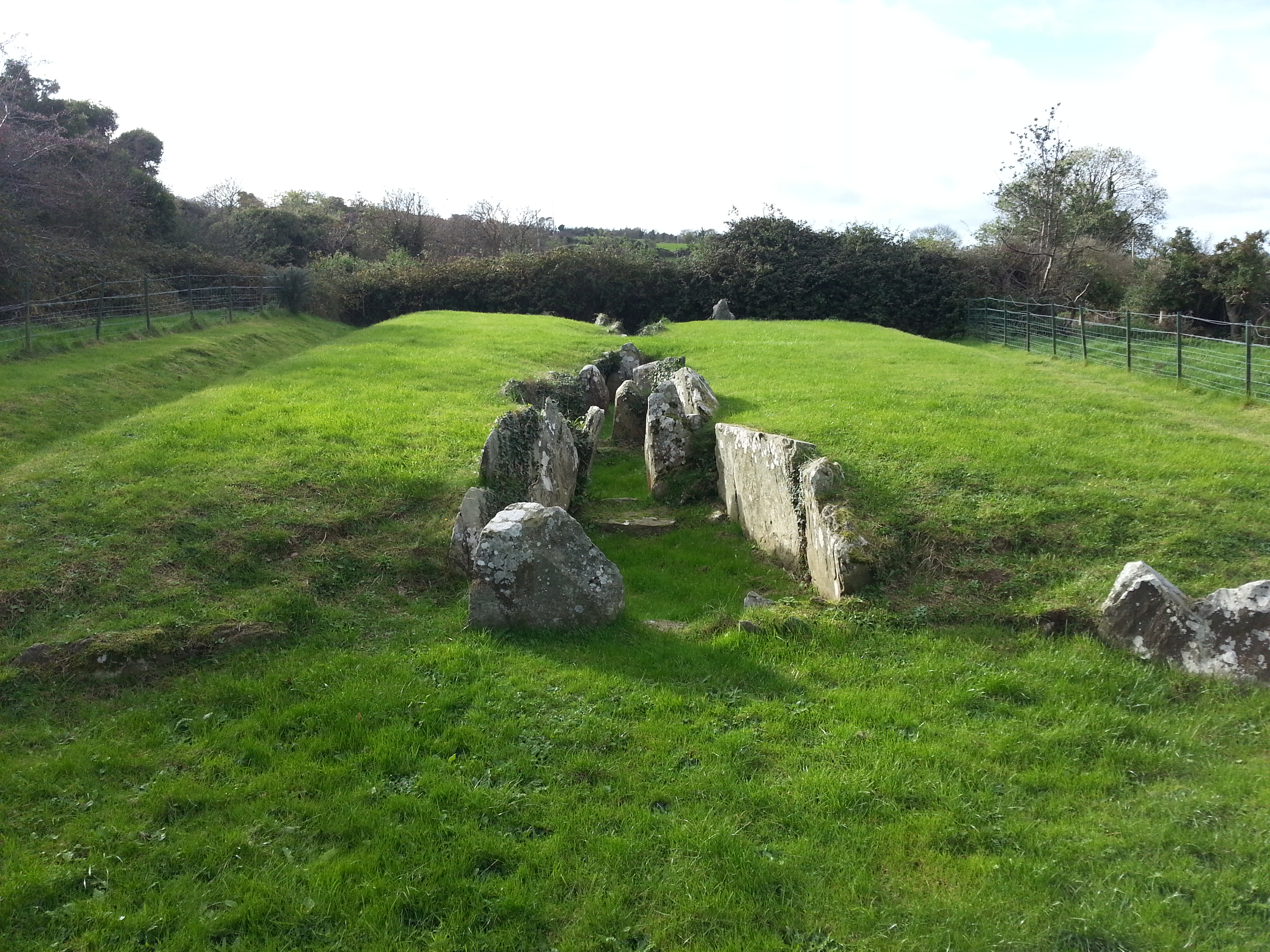

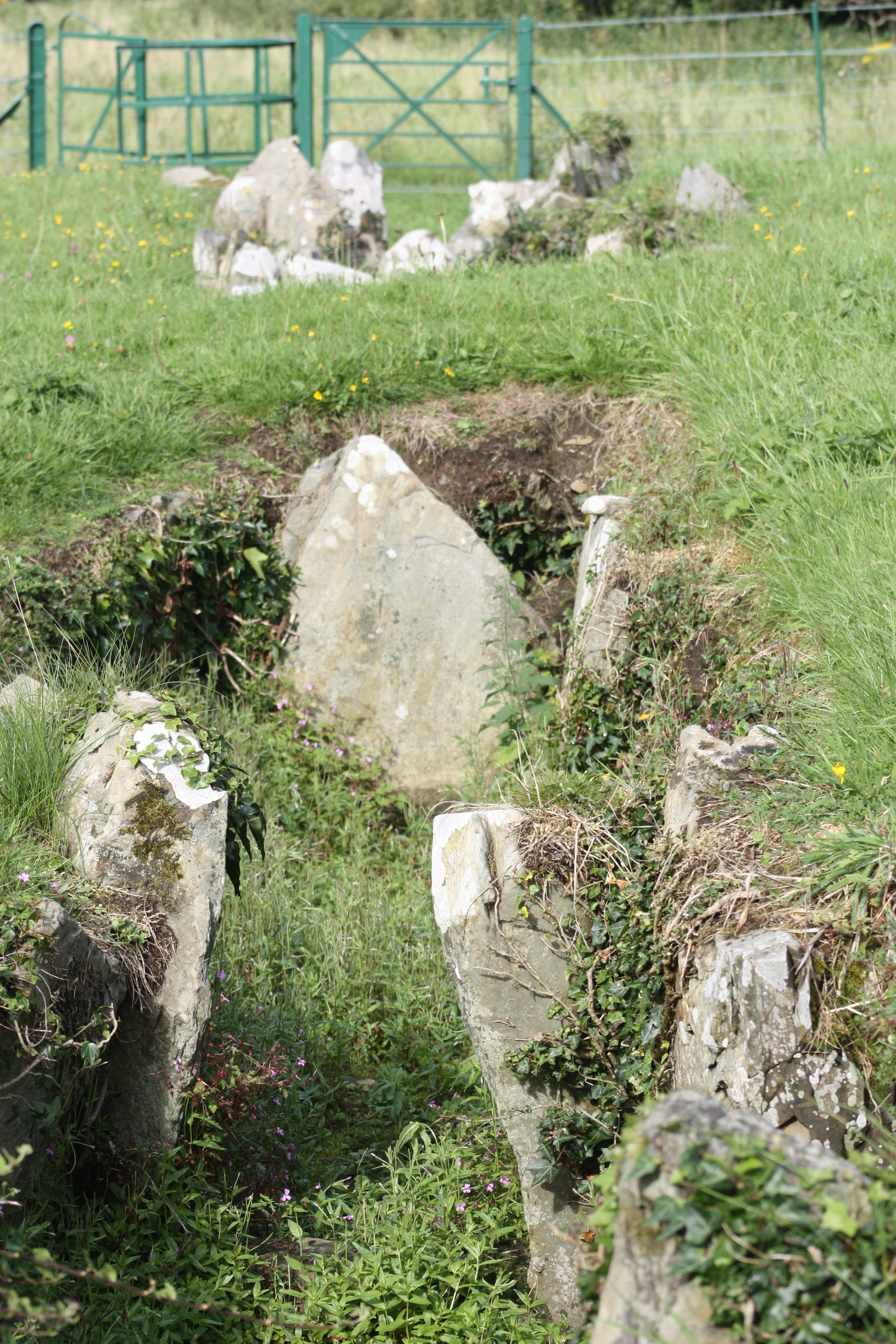

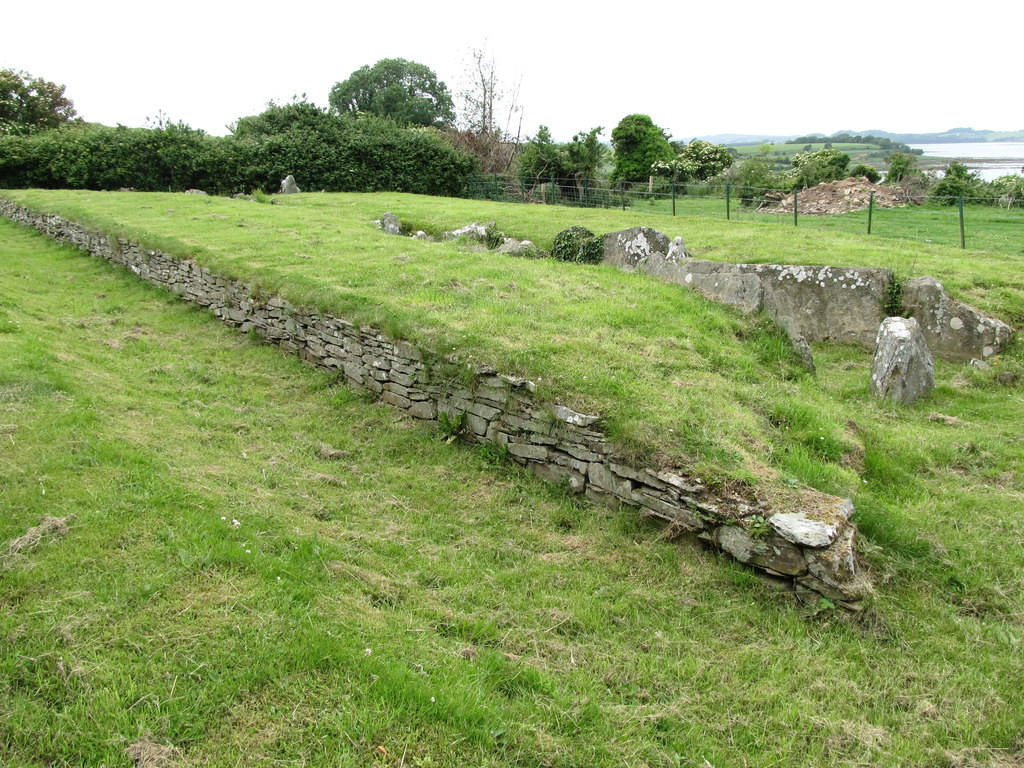

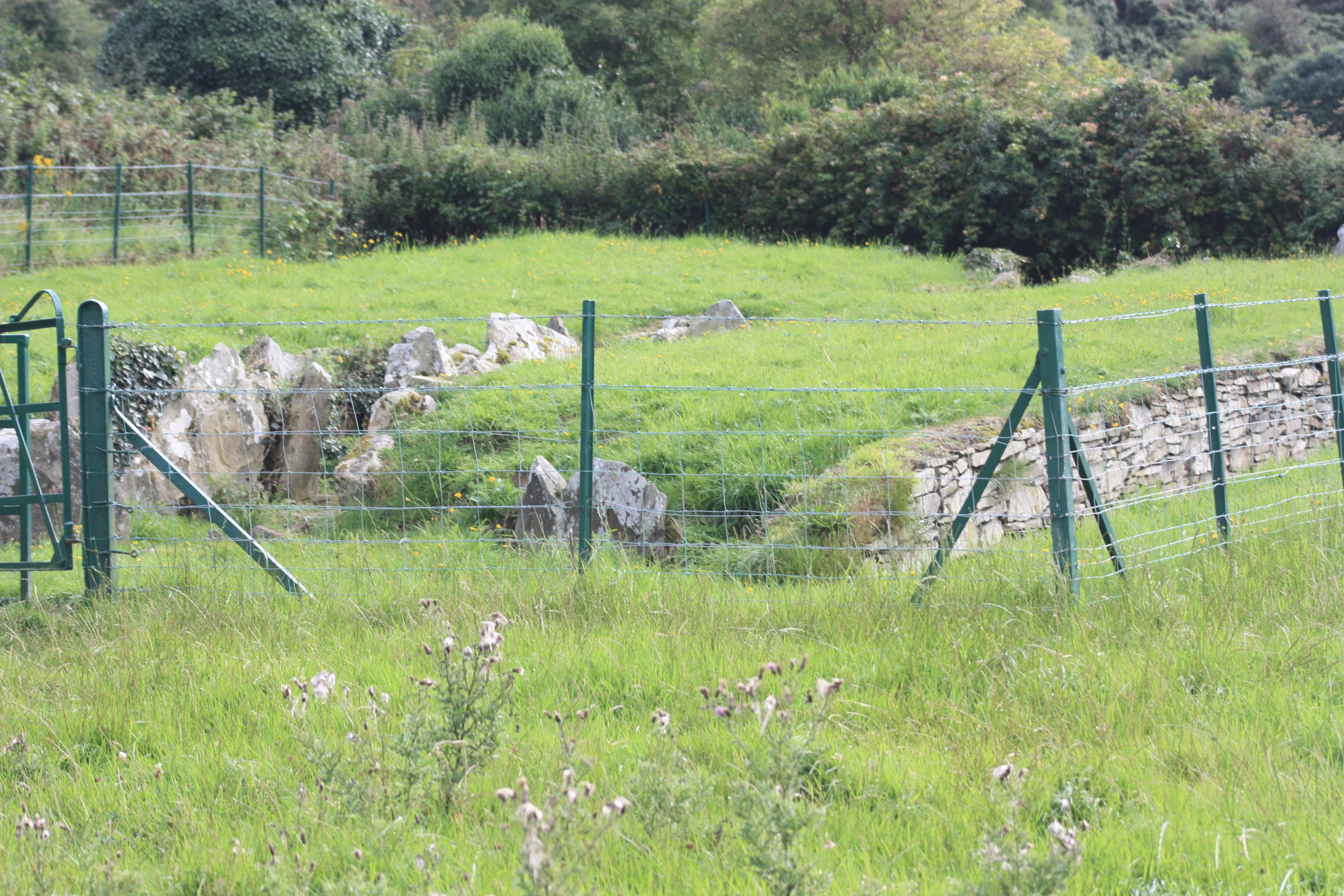

== See also ==
- List of archaeological sites in County Down
- List of megalithic monuments in Ireland
- Prehistoric Ireland
- Passage tombs in Ireland
