= List of statutory rules and orders of Northern Ireland, 1972 =

This is an incomplete list of statutory rules and orders of Northern Ireland during 1962.

Statutory rules and orders were the predecessor of statutory rules and they formed the secondary legislation of Northern Ireland between 1922 and 1973.

Number	Title
No. 16	Department under the Diseases of Animals (Approval of Disinfectants) Order (Northern Ireland) 1972
No. 131	Local Government (Boundaries) Order (Northern Ireland) 1972
No. 243	Belfast Water Order (Northern Ireland) 1972
No. 263	Pensions Increase (Annual Review) Order (Northern Ireland) 1972
No. 363	European Communities (Food and Drugs) Order (Northern Ireland) 1972

== See also ==
- List of statutory rules of Northern Ireland
