= List of statutory rules and orders of Northern Ireland, 1973 =

This is an incomplete list of statutory rules and orders of Northern Ireland during 1973. Statutory rules and orders were the predecessor of statutory rules and they formed the secondary legislation of Northern Ireland between 1922 and 1973.

Number	Title
No. 35	Northern Ireland Fishery Harbour Authority Order (Northern Ireland) 1973
No. 211	Local Government (Modifications and Repeals of Health etc. Legislation) Order (Northern Ireland) 1973
No. 313	Local Government (Modification and Repeal of Transferred Provisions relating to Harbours) Order (Northern Ireland) 1973
No. 364	Pensions Increase (Annual Review) Order (Northern Ireland) 1973
No. 528	Petroleum (Liquid Methane) Order (Northern Ireland) 1973

== See also ==
- List of statutory rules of Northern Ireland
