= Belfast City and District Water Commissioners =

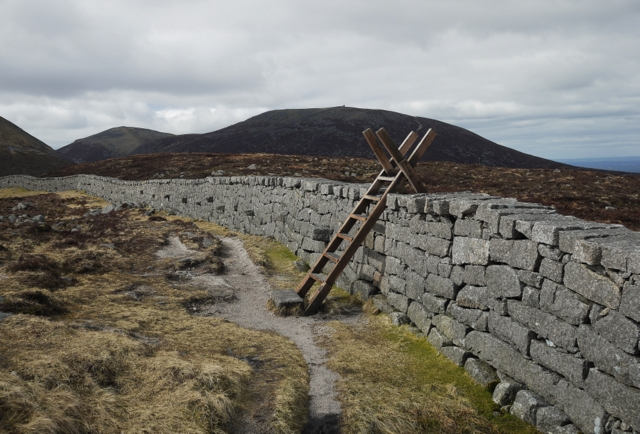
The Mourne Wall, Slievenaglogh, 2010.

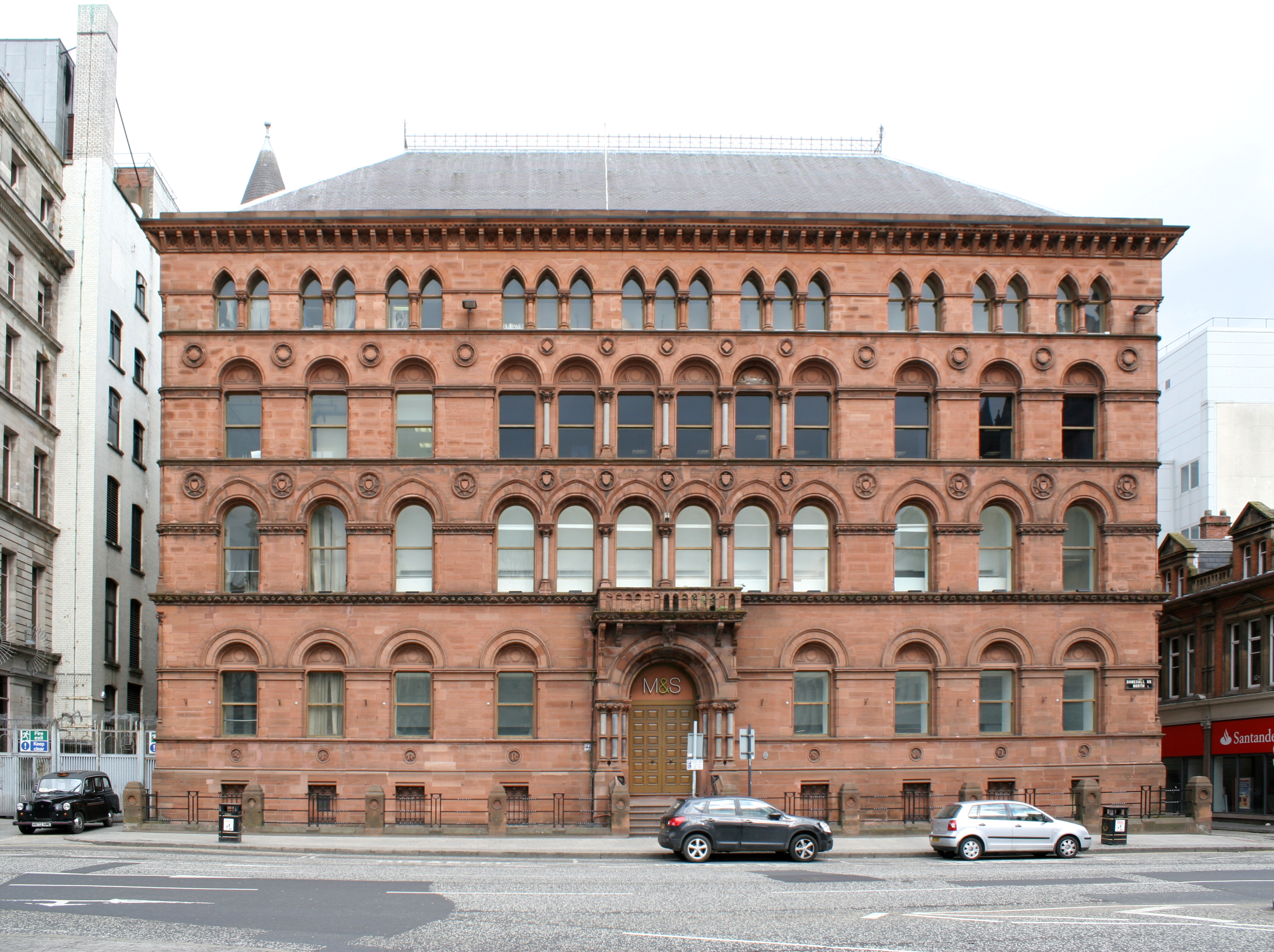
The Water Office in Belfast, headquarters of the Belfast City and District Water Commissioners before the Second World War. Since 1983 it has been occupied by Marks & Spencer.

The Belfast Water Commissioners was a public body in Ireland and later Northern Ireland, (Note: From the body's formation until December 1922, the entire island of Ireland was part of the United Kingdom of Great Britain and Ireland. Following most of Ireland's independence as the Irish Free State in December 1922, the Water Commissioners continued to exist in the newly created Northern Ireland, which remained part of the United Kingdom of Great Britain and Northern Ireland.) established by the Belfast Water Act 1840, to improve the supply of water to the expanding town, later city, of Belfast. By 1852, the town was suffering a shortfall in supply of almost one million gallons per day. In 1889, the body's name was changed to Belfast City and District Water Commissioners in recognition of the expanding boundaries of Belfast and resulting increased demand for water. Belfast officially became a city in 1888.

Major infrastructure completed for the Belfast City and District Water Commissioners includes the Mourne Conduit, the Mourne Wall, Silent Valley Reservoir, the Binnian Tunnel and Ben Crom Reservoir.

The water commissioners' responsibilities were transferred to the Department of the Environment's Water Executive in 1974 and are now managed by Northern Ireland Water.

== History ==
The Belfast Water Commissioners was a public body established by the Belfast Water Act 1840 to improve the supply of water to the expanding city of Belfast. By 1852, the city was suffering a shortfall in supply of almost one million gallons per day.

In 1889, the expansion of Belfast's boundaries and increased demand for water lead to the Belfast Water Act 1889, which changed the name to Belfast City and District Water Commissioners or BC&DWC.

In 1891, the commissioners appointed local civil engineer, Luke Livingston Macassey to identify water resources to sustain Belfast. Macassey ruled out Lough Neagh which, as the largest lake in the British Isles, would have been an abundant source of water, however water quality was a concern and its altitude meant that water would have to be pumped to Belfast. Other sources in County Down, and County Antrim were rejected:

- Mcauley's Lake in Ballynahinch - Altitude favourable, however too small a body of water to justify investment and quality not high.
- Slieve Croob - Risk of disputes with mill owners ruled out this source
- Bryansford in Newcastle - Like Ballynahinch, too small a quantity of water to justify investment
- Upper Bann area near Banbridge
- Clady, Glenravel and Glenarm, County Antrim

Macassey ultimately selected the Mourne Mountains in Down. Upon deciding on the site, the water commissioners acquired a 9,000-acre (3,600 ha) catchment area; successive local acts of Parliament, the Belfast Water Act 1893, the Belfast Water Act 1897 and the Belfast Water Act 1899, allowed the purchase of the Mournes land and related access permits and water rights. At the time the catchment was capable of providing some 30 million imperial gallons (140,000 m^{3}) of water per day, however because this was more than was required at that point, a three phase scheme was developed.

The first stage was to divert water from the Kilkeel and Annalong rivers through the Mourne Conduit to a reservoir near Carryduff. These water pipes and tunnels were capable of supplying 10 million imperial gallons (45,000 m^{3}) of water per day. Work was completed in 1901. The second stage was to build a storage reservoir, the Silent Valley Reservoir across the Kilkeel River, to supply another 10 million imperial gallons (45,000 m^{3}) of water per day. Design work on this phase began in 1910, but procurement of the work was delayed by World War I. A contract was eventually awarded in 1923 to S. Pearson & Son and work continued until 1933.

The commissioners were responsible for the construction of the Mourne Wall which encloses the catchment area. Northern Ireland Water began to restore in this structure in 2017.

In 1938, the commissioners purchased a building now known as the Water Office due to the need for more office space. It was purchased by Marks & Spencer in 1983 and became part of its extended city centre store.

=== Irish Boundary Commission ===
The Irish Boundary Commission was established in 1924 to decide on the delineation of the border between the Irish Free State and Northern Ireland. The BC&DWC made representations to that body, objecting to any movement of the border north from the existing County Down boundary on the following grounds:

1. That the existing boundary of Carlingford Lough was a natural boundary and therefore preferable to an artificial boundary.
2. A movement of the border northwards, but not encompassing the Mourne Mountains, would make the Silent Valley and related infrastructure more vulnerable to attack and would necessitate continuous protection.
3. A boundary to the north of the commissioners' facilities in the Mourne Mountains would place the source of water in a different jurisdiction from the areas served which would involve the risk of "interference with the undertaking, restrictions in the use of the water [and] increased taxation"
4. The latter would have financial implications for the BC&DWC, for example their ability to raise finance.

The border was ultimately unchanged, leaving the Mourne catchment area and water infrastructure within Northern Ireland.

== Successor organisations ==
The powers vested in the Belfast City and District Water Commissioners were transferred to the Minister of Development on 1 October 1973, by the Water and Sewerage Services (Northern Ireland) Order 1973 (SI 1973/70). Provision of water and sewerage services became the responsibility of the Water Service by 1 January 1974, itself a division of the Department of the Environment. In 1996, the Water Executive became an executive agency and was rebranded as the Northern Ireland Water Service and, in 1999, responsibility for water transferred to the Department for Regional Development. The Northern Ireland Water Service became Northern Ireland Water in April 2007.

== Relevant legislation ==
- Belfast Water Act 1840 (3 & 4 Vict. c. lxxix)
- Commissioners Clauses Act 1847 (10 & 11 Vict. c. 16)
- Waterworks Clauses Act 1847 (10 & 11 Vict. c. 17)
- Waterworks Clauses Act 1863 (26 & 27 Vict. c. 93)
- Belfast Water Act 1865 (28 & 29 Vict. c. clxxxix)
- Belfast Water Act 1874 (37 & 38 Vict. c. cli)
- Belfast Water Act 1879 (42 & 43 Vict. c. clxxii)
- Belfast Water Act 1884 (47 & 48 Vict. c. ccxix)
- Belfast Water Act 1889 (52 & 53 Vict. c. clv)
- Belfast Water Act 1893 (56 & 57 Vict. c. clxxviii)
- Belfast Water Act 1897 (60 & 61 Vict. c. clxxxix)
- Belfast Water Act 1899 (62 & 63 Vict. c. xcv)
- Belfast Water Act (Northern Ireland) 1923 (13 & 14 Geo. 5. c. i (N.I.))
- Belfast Water Act (Northern Ireland) 1924 (14 & 15 Geo. 5. c. iii (N.I.))
- Belfast Water Act (Northern Ireland) 1929 (20 Geo. 5. c. i (N.I.))
- Belfast Water Act (Northern Ireland) 1938 (2 Geo. 6. c. iii (N.I.))
- Belfast City and District Water Commissioners (Postponement of Elections) Order (Northern Ireland) 1940 (SR&O(NI) 1940/95)
- Belfast Water Order (Northern Ireland) 1948 (SR&O(NI) 1948/202)
- Belfast Water Order (Northern Ireland) 1953 (SR&O(NI) 1953/136)
- Belfast Water Order (Northern Ireland) 1965 (SR&O(NI) 1965/32)
- Belfast Water Order (Northern Ireland) 1967 (SR&O(NI) 1967/262)
- Belfast Water Order (Northern Ireland) 1972 (SR&O(NI) 1972/243)
- Water and Sewerage Services (Northern Ireland) Order 1973 (SI 1973/70)
- Water and Sewerage Services Regulations (Northern Ireland) 1973 (SR&O(NI) 1973/344)
