= 2005 Ballymoney Borough Council election =

Local government election in Northern Ireland

← 2001	5 May 2005	2011 →

All 16 seats to Ballymoney Borough Council 9 seats needed for a majority
	First party	Second party	Third party
Party	DUP	Sinn Féin	UUP
Seats won	8	3	2
Seat change	Steady	▲2	▼3
	Fourth party	Fifth party
Party	SDLP	Independent
Seats won	2	1
Seat change	Steady	▲1
- Party with the most votes by district.

Elections to Ballymoney Borough Council were held on 5 May 2005 on the same day as the other Northern Irish local government elections. The election used three district electoral areas to elect a total of 16 councillors.

== Election results ==
Ballymoney Borough Council Election Result 2005
Party	Seats	Gains	Losses	Net gain/loss	Seats %	Votes %	Votes	+/−
DUP	8	0	0	Steady	50.0	48.9	6,027	▲6.6
Sinn Féin	3	2	0	▲2	18.8	20.0	2,462	▲8.5
UUP	2	0	3	▼3	12.5	15.1	1,860	▼8.6
SDLP	2	0	0	Steady	12.5	12.3	1,512	▼5.3
Independent	1	1	1	▲1	6.3	3.8	473	▼1.1

Note: "Votes" are the first preference votes.

== Districts summary ==
Results of the Ballymoney Borough Council election, 2005 by district
Ward	%	Cllrs	%	Cllrs	%	Cllrs	%	Cllrs	%	Cllrs	Total Cllrs
Ward	DUP		Sinn Féin		UUP		SDLP		Others		Total Cllrs
Ballymoney Town	67.8	3	0.0	0	19.2	2	13.0	0	0.0	0	5
Bann Valley	43.3	3	33.7	2	12.4	0	10.6	1	0.0	0	6
Bushvale	38.6	2	19.6	1	14.9	0	13.9	1	13.0	1	5
Total	48.9	8	20.0	3	15.1	2	12.3	2	3.7	1	16

== Districts results ==
=== Ballymoney Town ===
2001: 3 x DUP, 2 x UUP
2005: 3 x DUP, 2 x UUP
2001-2005 Change: No change

Ballymoney Town - 5 seats
Party	Candidate	FPv%	Count		
Party	Candidate	FPv%	1	2	3
DUP	Mervyn Storey*	25.36%	888		
DUP	Cecil Cousley*	23.54%	824		
DUP	Ian Stevenson*	18.91%	662		
UUP	Tom McKeown*	11.74%	411	600.2	
UUP	James Simpson*	7.43%	260	367.25	594.65
SDLP	Justin McCamphill	13.02%	456	459.85	470.65
Electorate: 6,551 Valid: 3,501 (53.44%) Spoilt: 77 Quota: 584 Turnout: 3,578 (54.62%)

=== Bann Valley ===
2001: 3 x DUP, 1 x Sinn Féin, 1 x SDLP, 1 x UUP
2005: 3 x DUP, 2 x Sinn Féin, 1 x SDLP
2001-2005 Change: Sinn Féin gain from UUP

Bann Valley - 6 seats
Party	Candidate	FPv%	Count			
Party	Candidate	FPv%	1	2	3	4
Sinn Féin	Philip McGuigan*	20.43%	1,062			
DUP	John Finlay*	15.30%	795			
Sinn Féin	Daithí McKay	13.26%	689	945.5		
DUP	Robert Wilson*	14.24%	740	740	740	740
DUP	Audrey Patterson	13.76%	715	715	715	715
SDLP	Malachy McCamphill*	7.54%	392	420.2	484.1	704.9
UUP	Joe Gaston*	12.43%	646	646.3	646.9	649.5
SDLP	Charley O'Kane	3.04%	158	182.9	275	
Electorate: 7,643 Valid: 5,197 (68.00%) Spoilt: 100 Quota: 743 Turnout: 5,297 (69.31%)

=== Bushvale ===
2001: 2 x DUP, 2 x UUP, 1 x SDLP
2005: 2 x DUP, 1 x Sinn Féin, 1 x SDLP, 1 x Independent
2001-2005 Change: Sinn Féin and DUP gain from UUP (two seats), Independent leaves DUP

Bushvale - 5 seats
Party	Candidate	FPv%	Count					
Party	Candidate	FPv%	1	2	3	4	5	6
Sinn Féin	Anita Cavlan	19.55%	711					
DUP	Frank Campbell*	15.76%	573					
DUP	Evelyne Robinson	14.63%	532	532	544	582	788.78	
SDLP	Harry Connolly*	13.92%	506	602.48	604.48	606.48	606.48	606.48
Independent	Bill Kennedy*	13.01%	473	474.92	520.92	533.92	538.82	591.74
UUP	William Johnston	7.54%	274	274.32	447.32	470.32	477.18	540.88
DUP	Robert Holmes	8.20%	298	298	303			
UUP	William Logan*	7.40%	269	269.16				
Electorate: 5,692 Valid: 3,636 (63.88%) Spoilt: 60 Quota: 607 Turnout: 3,696 (64.93%)
