= 1997 Ballymoney Borough Council election =

Local government election in Northern Ireland

← 1993	21 May 1997	2001 →

All 16 seats to Ballymoney Borough Council 9 seats needed for a majority
	First party	Second party	Third party
Party	DUP	UUP	SDLP
Seats won	6	4	3
Seat change	0	▼2	0
	Fourth party	Fifth party
Party	Independent	Sinn Féin
Seats won	2	1
Seat change	▲1	▲1
- Results by district electoral area, shaded by First Preference Votes.

Elections to Ballymoney Borough Council were held on 21 May 1997 on the same day as the other Northern Irish local government elections. The election used three district electoral areas to elect a total of 16 councillors.

== Election results ==
Ballymoney Borough Council Election Result 1997
Party	Seats	Gains	Losses	Net gain/loss	Seats %	Votes %	Votes	+/−
DUP	6	0	0	0	37.5	32.7	3,102	▲1.8
UUP	6	0	2	▼2	37.5	26.0	2,467	▼7.5
SDLP	3	1	1	0	18.8	23.7	2,249	▲4.8
Independent	2	1	0	▲1	12.5	9.8	927	▲1.9
Sinn Féin	1	0	0	▲1	6.3	5.3	508	▲2.1
PUP	0	0	0	0	0.0	1.9	180	New
NI Women's Coalition	0	0	0	0	0.0	0.6	66	New

Note: "Votes" are the first preference votes.

== Districts summary ==
Results of the Ballymoney Borough Council election, 1997 by district
Ward	%	Cllrs	%	Cllrs	%	Cllrs	%	Cllrs	%	Cllrs	Total Cllrs
Ward	DUP		UUP		SDLP		Sinn Féin		Others		Total Cllrs
Ballymoney Town	28.5	2	20.9	2	9.2	0	0.0	0	41.4	2	5
Bann Valley	35.2	2	24.6	2	27.4	1	12.8	1	0.0	0	6
Bushvale	33.1	2	33.0	1	32.7	2	0.0	0	1.2	0	5
Total	32.7	6	26.0	6	23.7	3	5.3	1	12.3	2	16

== Districts results ==
=== Ballymoney Town ===
1993: 2 x DUP, 2 x UUP, 1 x Independent
1997: 2 x Independent, 2 x DUP, 1 x UUP
1993-1997 Change: Independent gain from UUP

Ballymoney Town - 5 seats
Party	Candidate	FPv%	Count				
Party	Candidate	FPv%	1	2	3	4	5
DUP	Cecil Cousley*	17.90%	493				
Independent	Robert McComb*	15.72%	433	435	469		
UUP	Tom McKeown*	12.09%	333	334	370	422	438
Independent	Bill Williamson	9.48%	261	265	274	340	413
DUP	Samuel McConaghie*	10.64%	293	293	326	344	346
UUP	James Simpson*	8.79%	242	242	263	326	336
SDLP	Joan McCaffrey	9.26%	255	269	272	294	
Independent	Colin McVicker	8.46%	233	239	260		
PUP	Jeffrey Balmer	6.54%	180	181			
NI Women's Coalition	Mary McCusker	1.13%	31				
Electorate: 5,905 Valid: 2,754 (46.64%) Spoilt: 53 Quota: 460 Turnout: 2,807 (47.54%)

=== Bann Valley ===
1993: 2 x DUP, 2 x UUP, 2 x SDLP
1997: 2 x DUP, 2 x UUP, 1 x SDLP, 1 x Sinn Féin
1993-1997 Change: Sinn Féin gain from SDLP

Bann Valley - 6 seats
Party	Candidate	FPv%	Count						
Party	Candidate	FPv%	1	2	3	4	5	6	7
UUP	Joe Gaston*	18.09%	719						
SDLP	Malachy McCamphill*	17.76%	706						
DUP	Robert Halliday*	15.30%	608						
DUP	Robert Wilson*	11.09%	441	454.44	454.63	482.35	743.35		
UUP	John Watt*	6.54%	260	382.85	382.85	385.07	463.49	578.49	
Sinn Féin	Martin O'Neill	12.78%	508	508.21	519.42	519.42	519.42	519.42	519.42
SDLP	Mary McPoland	9.61%	382	382	502.27	502.27	503.27	503.27	504.27
DUP	John Finlay	8.83%	351	361.29	361.29	367.11			
Electorate: 6,991 Valid: 3,975 (56.86%) Spoilt: 80 Quota: 568 Turnout: 4,055 (58.00%)

=== Bushvale ===
1993: 2 x DUP, 2 x UUP, 1 x SDLP
1997: 2 x DUP, 2 x SDLP, 1 x UUP
1993-1997 Change: SDLP gain from UUP

Bushvale - 5 seats
Party	Candidate	FPv%	Count						
Party	Candidate	FPv%	1	2	3	4	5	6	7
SDLP	Harry Connolly*	26.17%	725						
DUP	Frank Campbell*	17.08%	473						
DUP	Bill Kennedy*	15.99%	443	443.38	450.5	455.52	491.52		
UUP	William Logan*	12.64%	350	351.52	351.98	356.76	456.68	473.68	
SDLP	Francis McCluskey	6.53%	181	429.14	429.16	445.96	445.98	445.98	445.98
UUP	John Ramsay*	12.31%	341	341	341.56	346.56	425.28	433.28	444.92
UUP	William Johnston	8.01%	222	222.76	223.88	225.88			
NI Women's Coalition	Joan Cosgrove	1.26%	35	42.6	42.64				
Electorate: 5,387 Valid: 2,770 (51.42%) Spoilt: 49 Quota: 462 Turnout: 2,819 (52.33%)
