= 2001 Ballymoney Borough Council election =

Local government election in Northern Ireland

← 1997	7 June 2001	2005 →

All 16 seats to Ballymoney Borough Council 9 seats needed for a majority
	First party	Second party	Third party
Party	DUP	UUP	SDLP
Seats won	8	5	2
Seat change	▲2	▲1	▼1
	Fourth party	Fifth party
Party	Sinn Féin	Independent
Seats won	1	0
Seat change	0	▼2
- Party with the most votes by district.

Elections to Ballymoney Borough Council were held on 7 June 2001 on the same day as the other Northern Irish local government elections. The election used three district electoral areas to elect a total of 16 councillors.

== Election results ==
Ballymoney Borough Council Election Result 2001
Party	Seats	Gains	Losses	Net gain/loss	Seats %	Votes %	Votes	+/−
DUP	8	0	0	▲2	50.0	42.3	5,310	▲9.6
UUP	5	0	3	▲1	31.3	23.7	2,978	▼2.3
SDLP	2	0	1	▼1	12.5	17.6	2,209	▼6.1
Sinn Féin	1	0	0	0	18.8	20.0	2,462	▲6.2
Independent	0	0	2	▼2	0.0	4.9	620	▼4.9

Note: "Votes" are the first preference votes.

== Districts summary ==
Results of the Ballymoney Borough Council election, 2001 by district
Ward	%	Cllrs	%	Cllrs	%	Cllrs	%	Cllrs	%	Cllrs	Total Cllrs
Ward	DUP		UUP		SDLP		Sinn Féin		Others		Total Cllrs
Ballymoney Town	44.2	3	26.9	2	12.3	0	0.0	0	16.6	0	5
Bann Valley	39.7	3	18.6	1	20.2	1	21.5	1	0.0	0	6
Bushvale	44.0	2	27.8	2	19.4	1	8.8	0	0.0	0	5
Total	42.3	8	23.7	5	17.6	2	11.5	1	4.9	0	16

== Districts results ==
=== Ballymoney Town ===
1997: 2 x Independent, 2 x DUP, 1 x UUP
2001: 3 x DUP, 2 x UUP
1997-2001 Change: DUP and UUP gain from Independent (two seats)

Ballymoney Town - 5 seats
Party	Candidate	FPv%	Count					
Party	Candidate	FPv%	1	2	3	4	5	6
DUP	Cecil Cousley*	21.11%	788					
UUP	Tom McKeown*	10.61%	396	408.6	454.28	631.28		
DUP	Mervyn Storey	11.49%	429	485.49	493.12	497.33	661.33	
DUP	Ian Stevenson	11.60%	433	500.62	513.09	531.61	639.61	
UUP	James Simpson	9.40%	351	356.04	407.3	483.82	536.5	570.5
SDLP	Justin McCamphill	12.30%	459	459.84	485.05	497.05	507.05	509.05
Independent	Jim Wright	10.07%	376	379.57	420.2	424.83		
UUP	William Johnston	6.88%	257	263.51	306.98			
Independent	Jeffrey Balmer	3.35%	125	128.78				
Independent	Anne Logan	3.19%	119	123.41				
Electorate: 6,187 Valid: 3,733 (60.34%) Spoilt: 70 Quota: 623 Turnout: 3,803 (61.47%)

=== Bann Valley ===
1997: 2 x DUP, 2 x UUP, 1 x SDLP, 1 x Sinn Féin
2001: 3 x DUP, 1 x Sinn Féin, 1 x SDLP, 1 x UUP
1997-2001 Change: DUP gain from UUP

Bann Valley - 6 seats
Party	Candidate	FPv%	Count				
Party	Candidate	FPv%	1	2	3	4	5
Sinn Féin	Philip McGuigan	21.51%	1,123				
DUP	John Finlay	16.46%	859				
SDLP	Malachy McCamphill*	12.70%	663	803.8			
UUP	Joe Gaston*	13.62%	711	712.2	926.2		
DUP	Robert Halliday*	12.93%	675	675.8	687.8	753.8	
DUP	Robert Wilson*	10.34%	540	540	556	611	717.68
SDLP	Charley O'Kane	7.43%	388	614.4	617.4	629.4	629.68
UUP	John Watt*	5.00%	261	261.4			
Electorate: 7,451 Valid: 5,220 (70.06%) Spoilt: 122 Quota: 746 Turnout: 5,342 (71.70%)

=== Bushvale ===
1997: 2 x DUP, 2 x SDLP, 1 x UUP
2001: 2 x DUP, 2 x UUP, 1 x SDLP
1997-2001 Change: UUP gain from SDLP

Bushvale - 5 seats
Party	Candidate	FPv%	Count		
Party	Candidate	FPv%	1	2	3
DUP	Bill Kennedy*	27.66%	997		
DUP	Frank Campbell*	16.34%	589	931.35	
UUP	John Ramsay	15.12%	545	567.14	664.72
UUP	William Logan*	12.68%	457	481.6	614.85
SDLP	Harry Connolly*	15.20%	548	550.05	553.74
Sinn Féin	Sean McErlain	8.82%	318	318	318
SDLP	Francis McCluskey*	4.19%	151	151.41	151.82
Electorate: 5,639 Valid: 3,605 (63.93%) Spoilt: 76 Quota: 601 Turnout: 3,681 (65.28%)
