= 1989 Ballymoney Borough Council election =

Local government election in Northern Ireland

← 1985	17 May 1989	1993 →

All 16 seats to Ballymoney Borough Council 9 seats needed for a majority
	First party	Second party	Third party
Party	UUP	DUP	SDLP
Seats won	6	6	3
Seat change	0	0	▲1
	Fourth party	Fifth party
Party	Independent	Sinn Féin
Seats won	1	0
Seat change	0	▼1

Elections to Ballymoney Borough Council were held on 17 May 1989 on the same day as the other Northern Irish local government elections. The election used three district electoral areas to elect a total of 16 councillors.

== Election results ==
Ballymoney Borough Council Election Result 1989
Party	Seats	Gains	Losses	Net gain/loss	Seats %	Votes %	Votes	+/−
UUP	6	0	0	0	37.5	35.1	2,254	▲5.2
DUP	6	0	0	0	37.5	33.9	2,185	▼8.0
SDLP	3	1	0	▲1	18.8	21.7	1,401	▲9.0
Independent	1	0	0	0	6.3	0.0	0	▼7.1
Sinn Féin	0	0	1	▼1	0.0	9.3	600	▲3.8

Note: "Votes" are the first preference votes.

== Districts summary ==
Results of the Ballymoney Borough Council election, 1989 by district
Ward	%	Cllrs	%	Cllrs	%	Cllrs	%	Cllrs	Total Cllrs
Ward	UUP		DUP		SDLP		Others		Total Cllrs
Ballymoney Town	N/A	2	N/A	2	N/A	0	N/A	1	5
Bann Valley	30.8	2	35.8	2	23.6	2	9.8	0	6
Bushvale	40.8	2	31.3	2	19.2	1	8.7	0	5
Total	35.1	6	33.9	6	21.7	3	9.3	1	16

== Districts results ==
=== Ballymoney Town ===
1985: 2 x DUP, 2 x UUP, 1 x Independent
1989: 2 x DUP, 2 x UUP, 1 x Independent
1985-1989 Change: No change

Ballymoney Town - 5 seats
Party	Candidate	FPv%	Count
Party	Candidate	FPv%	1
DUP	Cecil Cousley*	N/A	N/A
UUP	James McKeown	N/A	N/A
Independent	Robert McComb*	N/A	N/A
DUP	Sam McConaghie	N/A	N/A
UUP	James Simpson*	N/A	N/A
Electorate: N/A Valid: N/A Spoilt: N/A Quota: N/A Turnout: N/A

- As only five candidates had been nominated for five seats, there was no vote in Ballymoney Town and all five candidates were deemed elected.

=== Bann Valley ===
1985: 2 x DUP, 2 x UUP, 1 x SDLP, 1 x Sinn Féin
1989: 2 x DUP, 2 x UUP, 2 x SDLP
1985-1989 Change: SDLP gain from Sinn Féin

Bann Valley - 6 seats
Party	Candidate	FPv%	Count			
Party	Candidate	FPv%	1	2	3	4
UUP	Joe Gaston*	21.21%	790			
DUP	Robert Halliday	19.06%	710			
UUP	John Watt	9.56%	356	558.95		
DUP	Robert Wilson*	11.52%	429	457.05	570.3	
SDLP	Malachy McCamphill*	12.08%	450	452.31	452.56	455.47
SDLP	Charley O'Kane	11.54%	430	430	430.25	431
Sinn Féin	Una Casey	9.80%	365	365.33	365.58	365.58
DUP	Daniel Taylor	5.23%	195	216.45	273.2	
Electorate: 6,284 Valid: 3,725 (59.28%) Spoilt: 91 Quota: 533 Turnout: 3,816 (60.73%)

=== Bushvale ===
1985: 2 x UUP, 2 x DUP, 1 x SDLP
1989: 2 x UUP, 2 x DUP, 1 x SDLP
1985-1989 Change: No change

Bushvale - 5 seats
Party	Candidate	FPv%	Count	
Party	Candidate	FPv%	1	2
UUP	John Ramsay*	21.18%	575	
UUP	William Logan*	19.63%	533	
SDLP	Harry Connolly*	19.19%	521	
DUP	Bill Kennedy	18.31%	497	
DUP	Donald McKenzie	13.04%	354	474.32
Sinn Féin	Malachy Carey	8.66%	235	235
Electorate: 4,942 Valid: 2,715 (54.94%) Spoilt: 59 Quota: 453 Turnout: 2,774 (56.13%)
