= 1993 Ballymoney Borough Council election =

Local government election in Northern Ireland

← 1989	19 May 1993	1997 →

All 16 seats to Ballymoney Borough Council 9 seats needed for a majority
	First party	Second party	Third party
Party	DUP	UUP	SDLP
Seats won	6	6	3
Seat change	0	0	0
	Fourth party
Party	Independent
Seats won	1
Seat change	0
- Party with the most votes by district.

Elections to Ballymoney Borough Council were held on 19 May 1993 on the same day as the other Northern Irish local government elections. The election used three district electoral areas to elect a total of 16 councillors.

There was no change from the prior election.

== Election results ==
Ballymoney Borough Council Election Result 1993
Party	Seats	Gains	Losses	Net gain/loss	Seats %	Votes %	Votes	+/−
DUP	6	0	0	0	37.5	34.5	3,114	▲0.6
UUP	6	0	0	0	37.5	33.5	3,021	▼1.6
SDLP	3	0	0	0	18.8	18.9	1,711	▼2.8
Independent	1	0	0	0	6.3	7.9	715	▲7.9
Sinn Féin	0	0	0	0	0.0	3.2	288	▼6.1
Alliance	0	0	0	0	0.0	2.0	181	▲2.0

Note: "Votes" are the first preference votes.

== Districts summary ==
Results of the Ballymoney Borough Council election, 1993 by district
Ward	%	Cllrs	%	Cllrs	%	Cllrs	%	Cllrs	Total Cllrs
Ward	DUP		UUP		SDLP		Others		Total Cllrs
Ballymoney Town	36.6	2	29.5	2	0.0	0	33.9	1	5
Bann Valley	34.2	2	31.9	2	26.1	1	7.8	0	6
Bushvale	32.8	2	39.4	2	27.8	1	0.0	0	5
Total	34.5	6	33.5	6	18.9	3	13.1	1	16

== Districts results ==
=== Ballymoney Town ===
1989: 2 x DUP, 2 x UUP, 1 x Independent
1993: 2 x DUP, 2 x UUP, 1 x Independent
1989-1993 Change: No change

Ballymoney Town - 5 seats
Party	Candidate	FPv%	Count					
Party	Candidate	FPv%	1	2	3	4	5	6
DUP	Cecil Cousley*	24.05%	636					
Independent	Robert McComb*	20.46%	541					
DUP	Samuel McConaghie*	12.59%	333	475.29				
UUP	Tom McKeown	10.17%	269	291.32	321.56	336.3	348.66	494.39
UUP	James Simpson*	11.20%	296	305.92	320.83	327.1	341.52	409.64
Independent	Colin McVicker	6.58%	174	180.2	199.1	202.4	309.49	342.53
UUP	Helen McKeown	8.09%	214	222.06	241.8	249.83	271.83	
Alliance	Hugh McFarland	6.85%	181	181.93	194.53	195.08		
Electorate: 5,804 Valid: 2,644 (45.55%) Spoilt: 56 Quota: 441 Turnout: 2,700 (46.52%)

=== Bann Valley ===
1989: 2 x DUP, 2 x UUP, 2 x SDLP
1993: 2 x DUP, 2 x UUP, 2 x SDLP
1989-1993 Change: No change

Bann Valley - 6 seats
Party	Candidate	FPv%	Count						
Party	Candidate	FPv%	1	2	3	4	5	6	7
UUP	Joe Gaston*	23.48%	865						
DUP	Robert Halliday*	16.80%	619						
SDLP	Charley O'Kane*	16.64%	613						
UUP	John Watt*	8.47%	312	592.8					
DUP	Robert Wilson*	12.54%	462	493.2	547.65				
SDLP	Malachy McCamphill*	9.39%	346	348	348.15	423.75	426.48	426.48	583.78
DUP	Daniel Taylor	4.86%	179	198.2	231.5	231.5	293.03	311.33	311.33
Sinn Féin	Pearse McMahon	7.82%	288	288.4	288.4	297.25	297.25	297.25	
Electorate: 6,638 Valid: 3,684 (55.50%) Spoilt: 80 Quota: 527 Turnout: 3,764 (56.70%)

=== Bushvale ===
1989: 2 x UUP, 2 x DUP, 1 x SDLP
1993: 2 x UUP, 2 x DUP, 1 x SDLP
1989-1993 Change: No change

Bushvale - 5 seats
Party	Candidate	FPv%	Count		
Party	Candidate	FPv%	1	2	3
SDLP	Harry Connolly*	27.83%	752		
DUP	Frank Campbell	18.13%	490		
UUP	William Logan*	16.06%	434	551	
DUP	Bill Kennedy*	14.62%	395	421	425
UUP	John Ramsay*	14.25%	385	406	439
UUP	William Johnston	9.10%	246	341	383
Electorate: 5,200 Valid: 2,702 (51.96%) Spoilt: 74 Quota: 451 Turnout: 2,776 (53.38%)
