= 2011 Ballymoney Borough Council election =

Local government election in Northern Ireland

← 2005	5 May 2011	2014 →

All 16 seats to Ballymoney Borough Council 9 seats needed for a majority
	First party	Second party	Third party
Party	DUP	Sinn Féin	UUP
Seats won	8	3	2
Seat change	Steady	Steady	Steady
	Fourth party	Fifth party	Sixth party
Party	SDLP	TUV	Independent
Seats won	1	1	1
Seat change	▼1	▲1	Steady
- Party with the most votes by district.

Elections to Ballymoney Borough Council were held on 5 May 2011 on the same day as the other Northern Irish local government elections. The election used three district electoral areas to elect a total of 16 councillors.

== Election results ==
Ballymoney Borough Council Election Result 2011
Party	Seats	Gains	Losses	Net gain/loss	Seats %	Votes %	Votes	+/−
DUP	8	0	0	Steady	50.0	45.3	5,182	▼3.6
Sinn Féin	3	0	0	Steady	18.8	20.5	2,344	▲0.5
UUP	2	1	1	Steady	12.5	13.7	1,563	▼1.4
SDLP	1	0	1	▼1	6.3	9.9	1,133	▼2.4
TUV	1	1	0	▲1	6.3	7.6	870	New
Independent	1	1	1	Steady	6.3	3.0	347	▼0.8

Note: "Votes" are the first preference votes.

== Districts summary ==
Results of the Ballymoney Borough Council election, 2011 by district
Ward	%	Cllrs	%	Cllrs	%	Cllrs	%	Cllrs	%	Cllrs	%	Cllrs	Total Cllrs
Ward	DUP		Sinn Féin		UUP		SDLP		TUV		Others		Total Cllrs
Ballymoney Town	56.5	3	0.0	0	15.0	1	9.9	0	7.4	0	11.2	1	5
Bann Valley	42.3	3	34.0	2	7.1	0	7.6	0	9.0	1	0.0	0	6
Bushvale	39.5	2	19.7	1	21.9	1	13.1	1	5.8	0	0.0	0	5
Total	45.3	8	20.5	3	13.7	2	9.9	1	7.6	1	3.0	1	16

== Districts results ==
=== Ballymoney Town ===
2005: 3 x DUP, 2 x UUP
2011: 3 x DUP, 1 x UUP, 1 x Independent
2005-2011 Change: Independent gain from UUP

Ballymoney Town - 5 seats
Party	Candidate	FPv%	Count					
Party	Candidate	FPv%	1	2	3	4	5	6
DUP	Mervyn Storey*	35.28%	1,090					
DUP	Ian Stevenson*	7.70%	238	547.42				
DUP	Cecil Cousley*	8.77%	271	360.1	370.7	382.46	558.64	
UUP	Tom McKeown*	8.93%	276	310.02	312.12	471.69	488.48	577.48
Independent	Iain McAfee	11.23%	347	366.98	368.58	384.73	397.3	448.47
SDLP	Daniel Hendrie	9.90%	306	313.02	313.22	316.22	317.81	323.91
TUV	Billy Kerr	7.38%	228	235.02	235.72	242.36	249.29	
DUP	Brian Kelly	4.79%	148	223.06	233.51	240.46		
UUP	James Simpson*	6.02%	186	213	215.2			
Electorate: 6,575 Valid: 3,090 (47.00%) Spoilt: 59 Quota: 516 Turnout: 3,149 (47.89%)

=== Bann Valley ===
2005: 3 x DUP, 2 x Sinn Féin, 1 x SDLP
2011: 3 x DUP, 2 x Sinn Féin, 1 x TUV
2005-2011 Change: TUV gain from SDLP

Bann Valley - 6 seats
Party	Candidate	FPv%	Count							
Party	Candidate	FPv%	1	2	3	4	5	6	7	8
DUP	John Finlay*	18.50%	905							
Sinn Féin	Philip McGuigan*	17.91%	876							
DUP	Robert Halliday	11.72%	573	706.63						
DUP	Jason Atkinson	12.08%	591	633.32	633.32	638.34	779.34			
Sinn Féin	Cathal McLaughlin	9.06%	443	443.46	580.06	580.07	580.07	580.07	876.07	
TUV	William Blair	9.00%	440	456.33	456.33	456.64	553.41	604.41	606.84	607.84
SDLP	Malachy McCamphill*	7.63%	373	374.15	394.95	395	432.46	446.46	486.26	557.26
Sinn Féin	Leanne Peacock	7.05%	345	345.23	359.83	359.83	360.03	360.03		
UUP	Steven Phillips	7.05%	345	352.36	352.56	352.74				
Electorate: 8,473 Valid: 4,891 (57.72%) Spoilt: 123 Quota: 699 Turnout: 5,104 (60.24%)

=== Bushvale ===
2005: 2 x DUP, 1 x Sinn Féin, 1 x SDLP, 1 x Independent
2011: 2 x DUP, 1 x UUP, 1 x Sinn Féin, 1 x SDLP
2005-2011 Change: Independent joins UUP

Bushvale - 5 seats
Party	Candidate	FPv%	Count					
Party	Candidate	FPv%	1	2	3	4	5	6
DUP	Evelyne Robinson*	22.18%	767					
DUP	Frank Campbell*	17.32%	599					
UUP	Bill Kennedy*	15.38%	532	633.85				
Sinn Féin	Anita Cavlan*	14.57%	504	504.7	504.94	641.94		
SDLP	Harry Connolly*	13.13%	454	457.85	458.09	492.09	495.68	558.92
UUP	William Johnston	6.48%	224	275.45	326.09	326.79	446.21	447.45
TUV	Peter Deans	5.84%	202	229.3	232.66	232.9		
Sinn Féin	Jimmy Gaston	5.09%	176	177.05	177.53			
Electorate: 6,196 Valid: 3,458 (55.81%) Spoilt: 50 Quota: 577 Turnout: 3,508 (56.62%)
