= Ballymoney Area C =

District electoral areas in Ballymoney, Northern Ireland

Ballymoney Area C was one of the three district electoral areas in Ballymoney, Northern Ireland which existed from 1973 to 1985. The district elected four members to Ballymoney Borough Council, and formed part of the North Antrim constituencies for the Northern Ireland Assembly and UK Parliament.

It was created for the 1973 local elections, and contained the wards of Fairhill, Newhill, The Hills and Town Park. It was abolished for the 1985 local elections and replaced by the Ballymoney Town DEA.

== Councillors ==
Election	Councillor (Party)	Councillor (Party)	Councillor (Party)	Councillor (Party)
1981	Cecil Cousley (DUP)	Ralph Stronge (DUP)	Mary Holmes (Independent)	Robert McComb (Independent)
1977	Brendan Smyth (Alliance)	Frederick Holland (Independent Unionist)	Mary Holmes (Independent)	Robert McComb (Independent)
1973	Brendan Smyth (Alliance)	Frederick Holland (Independent Unionist)	Mary Holmes (Independent)	Robert McComb (Independent)

== 1981 Election ==
1977: 2 x Independent, 1 x Alliance, 1 x Independent Unionist

1981: 2 x DUP, 2 x Independent

1977-1981 Change: DUP (two seats) gain from Alliance and Independent Unionist

Ballymoney Area C - 5 seats
Party	Candidate	FPv%	Count				
Party	Candidate	FPv%	1	2	3	4	5
DUP	Cecil Cousley	24.60%	747				
DUP	Ralph Stronge	17.71%	538	540	648.54		
Independent	Mary Holmes*	18.67%	567	589	600.52	753.52	
Independent	Robert McComb*	11.62%	353	379	386.56	511.98	617.98
Alliance	Brendan Smyth*	11.59%	352	435	435.36	462.54	476.54
UUP	James Simpson	10.80%	328	337	342.04		
Independent	Thomas McKenna	5.00%	152				
Electorate: 4,923 Valid: 3,037 (61.69%) Spoilt: 65 Quota: 608 Turnout: 3,102 (63.01%)

== 1977 Election ==
1973: 2 x Independent, 1 x Alliance, 1 x Independent Unionist

1977: 2 x Independent, 1 x Alliance, 1 x Independent Unionist

1973-1977 Change: No change

Ballymoney Area C - 5 seats
Party	Candidate	FPv%	Count			
Party	Candidate	FPv%	1	2	3	4
Independent	Robert McComb*	39.33%	875			
Independent	Mary Holmes*	16.40%	365	526		
Alliance	Brendan Smyth*	18.20%	405	440.36	448.72	
Ind. Unionist	Frederick Holland*	12.13%	270	326.16	377.08	450.06
UUP	Samuel Montgomery	7.55%	168	240.8	294.76	343.44
Independent	Ernest Lee	2.56%	57	93.4	115.44	
Alliance	John Greer	3.82%	85	92.28	96.84	
Electorate: 4,382 Valid: 2,225 (50.78%) Spoilt: 73 Quota: 446 Turnout: 2,298 (52.44%)

== 1973 Election ==
1973: 2 x Independent, 1 x Alliance, 1 x Independent Unionist

Ballymoney Area C - 5 seats
Party	Candidate	FPv%	Count				
Party	Candidate	FPv%	1	2	3	4	5
Independent	Robert McComb	29.69%	753				
Independent	Mary Holmes	14.16%	359	438.56	482.78	502.2	579.2
Alliance	Brendan Smyth	14.83%	376	390.96	395.64	496.36	516.36
Ind. Unionist	Frederick Holland	15.77%	400	436.72	456.76	466.12	514.76
UUP	James Simpson	10.69%	271	301.6	325.08	334.42	377.98
Independent	G. S. H. Hughes	5.95%	151	191.8	210.28	222.3	
Alliance	J. A. Scott	5.32%	135	144.18	152.88		
Independent	J. Pollock	3.59%	91	121.94			
Electorate: 4,073 Valid: 2,536 (62.26%) Spoilt: 22 Quota: 508 Turnout: 2,558 (62.80%)
