= Ballymoney (borough) =

District of Northern Ireland (1973–2015)

Coordinates: 55°4′15″N 6°30′28″W

Ballymoney Borough: Buirg Bhaile Monaidh
- Boundaries 1973 to 2015
- Area: 418 km^{2} (161 sq mi); Ranked 17th of 26
- District HQ: Ballymoney
- Catholic: 31.8%
- Protestant: 63.1%
- Country: Northern Ireland
- Sovereign state: United Kingdom
- Councillors: MLAs North Antrim DUP: 3 Sinn Féin: 1 TUV: 1 UUP: 1; MPs Ian Paisley Jr (DUP)
- Website: www.ballymoney.gov.uk

Ballymoney was a local government district with borough status in Northern Ireland. It was headquartered in Ballymoney. Other towns in the borough included Dervock, Dunloy, Cloughmills and Rasharkin. The borough had a population of 31,224 according to the 2011 census.

In May 2015 it was merged with the boroughs of Coleraine and Limavady and the District of Moyle to form the Causeway Coast and Glens district.

== Creation ==
Ballymoney was one of twenty-six districts created on 1 October 1973. It took over the areas Ballymoney Urban District Council and most of the surrounding Ballymoney Rural District in County Antrim.

== Borough council ==
The borough was divided into three electoral areas which between them returned 16 members. These were Ballymoney Town (5), Bann Valley (6) and Bushvale (5). Elections were conducted under the proportional representation single transferable vote system, and elections of the whole council were normally held every four years. The election due to take place in May 2009 was postponed in anticipation of the creation of eleven new councils in 2011. The proposed reforms were abandoned in 2010, and the most recent district council elections took place in 2011

As of February 2012 the political composition of the last council was: 8 Democratic Unionist Party (DUP), 3 Sinn Féin, 2 Ulster Unionist Party (UUP), 1 Social Democratic and Labour Party (SDLP), 1 Traditional Unionist Voice and 1 independent.

In 1977 Ballymoney District Council successfully petitioned for a grant of a charter of incorporation, constituting the district a borough.

=== Mayor of Ballymoney ===
The charter also created the office of mayor, who was chosen for a one-year term at the council's annual meeting.

| Year | Name | Political affiliation | Deputy | Deputy's affiliation |
|---|---|---|---|---|
| 1977–81 | Mary J. Holmes | Independent | Robert McComb | Independent |
| 1981–84 | Mary J. Holmes | Independent | Charles Steele | DUP |
| 1985–86 | Charles Steele | DUP | Joe Gaston | UUP |
| 1986–87 | Joe Gaston | UUP | James Patterson | DUP |
| 1986–87 | Joe Gaston | UUP | Robert Halliday | DUP |
| 1988–89 | Cecil Cousley | DUP | William Logan | UUP |
| 1990–93 | Joe Gaston | UUP | Samuel McConaghie | DUP |
| 1990–93 | Joe Gaston | UUP | Cecil Cousley | DUP |
| 1990–93 | Joe Gaston | UUP | Malachy McCamphill | SDLP |
| 1994–95 | Cecil Cousley | DUP | Robert Wilson | DUP |
| 1996–97 | Joe Gaston | UUP | Samuel McConaghie | DUP |
| 1997–98 | Frank Campbell | DUP | William Logan | UUP |
| 1997–98 | Frank Campbell | DUP | Samuel McConaghie | DUP |
| 1999–00 | William Logan | UUP | Bill Kennedy | DUP |
| 2000–01 | Bill Kennedy | DUP | Samuel McConaghie | DUP |
| 2000–01 | Bill Kennedy | DUP | John Finlay | DUP |
| 2002–03 | Frank Campbell | DUP | Cecil Cousley | DUP |
| 2004–05 | Cecil Cousley | DUP | Ian Stevenson | DUP |
| 2006–07 | John Finlay | DUP | Cecil Cousley | DUP |
| 2007–08 | John Finlay | DUP | Harry Connolly | SDLP |
| 2008–09 | John Finlay | DUP | Cecil Cousley | DUP |
| 2009–10 | Frank Campbell | DUP | Cecil Cousley | DUP |
| 2010–11 | Bill Kennedy | UUP | Cecil Cousley | DUP |
| 2011–12 | Ian Stevenson | DUP | Thomas McKeown | UUP |
| 2012–13 | Evelyne L Robinson | DUP | Cecil Cousley | DUP |
| 2013 - | John Finlay | DUP | Ian Stevenson | DUP |

Source: Freedom of Information request to Ballymoney Borough Council

== Freedom of the Borough ==
On 22 February 1997 The Ballymoney Branch of the Royal British Legion was awarded the Freedom of the Borough. In 2012 the Royal Irish Regiment and 152 (Ulster) Transport Regiment, The Royal Logistic Corps (Volunteers) were awarded the freedom of Ballymoney by the council. On both occasions the regiments held special marches through the town to celebrate the awards. Previous recipients include the Royal Ulster Constabulary (Both Regular and Reserve Forces), Northern Ireland Fire Brigade, Joey Dunlop, his brother Robert and the former MP for the area Ian Paisley.

== Town twinning ==
In 2000, Ballymoney Borough Council twinned with the French town of Vanves. Since 2001, the council has been a sister city of Benbrook in Texas and building on its motorcycling history, is also linked to the borough of Douglas, Isle of Man.

== Parliamentary and assembly representation ==
Together with the neighbouring districts of Ballymena and Moyle, it forms the North Antrim constituency for elections to the Westminster Parliament and Northern Ireland Assembly.

Former Councillors that went on to become MLAs included Philip McGuigan Mervyn Storey and Daithi McKay.

== Demographics ==
The borough has the highest life expectancy of any area in Northern Ireland, with the average male life expectancy at birth being 79.0 years and 82.6 years for females.

== See also ==
- Local government in Northern Ireland
