= 1981 Ballymoney Borough Council election =

Local government election in Northern Ireland

← 1977	20 May 1981	1985 →

All 16 seats to Ballymoney Borough Council 9 seats needed for a majority
	First party	Second party	Third party
Party	DUP	UUP	Independent
Seats won	7	3	3
Seat change	▲4	▼2	0
	Fourth party	Fifth party	Sixth party
Party	SDLP	Alliance	Ind. Unionist
Seats won	2	1	0
Seat change	▼1	0	▼1

Elections to Ballymoney Borough Council were held on 20 May 1981 on the same day as the other Northern Irish local government elections. The election used three district electoral areas to elect a total of 16 councillors.

== Election results ==
Ballymoney Borough Council Election Result 1981
Party	Seats	Gains	Losses	Net gain/loss	Seats %	Votes %	Votes	+/−
DUP	7	4	0	▲4	43.8	40.3	4,310	▲21.1
UUP	3	0	2	▼2	18.8	24.0	2,563	▼5.4
Independent	3	0	0	0	18.8	17.8	1,899	▼7.0
SDLP	2	0	1	▼1	12.5	9.9	1,054	▼5.2
Alliance	1	1	1	0	6.3	8.1	868	▼0.2

Note: "Votes" are the first preference votes.

== Districts summary ==
Results of the Ballymoney Borough Council election, 1981 by district
Ward	%	Cllrs	%	Cllrs	%	Cllrs	%	Cllrs	%	Cllrs	Total Cllrs
Ward	DUP		UUP		SDLP		Alliance		Others		Total Cllrs
Area A	53.8	2	27.2	1	0.0	0	19.0	1	0.0	0	4
Area B	31.6	3	30.3	2	21.3	2	0.0	0	16.8	1	8
Area C	42.3	2	10.8	0	11.6	0	0.0	0	35.3	2	4
Total	40.3	7	24.0	3	9.9	2	8.1	1	17.7	3	16

== Districts results ==
=== Area A ===
1977: 2 x DUP, 2 x UUP
1981: 2 x DUP, 1 x UUP, 1 x Alliance
1977-1981 Change: Alliance gain from UUP

Ballymoney Area A - 4 seats
Party	Candidate	FPv%	Count		
Party	Candidate	FPv%	1	2	3
DUP	Robert Halliday*	21.17%	575		
UUP	Kenneth Bamford*	14.87%	404	666	
Alliance	Hugh McFarland	19.00%	516	525	567
DUP	James Patterson	17.82%	484	512	544
DUP	Robert Wilson	14.84%	403	423	441
UUP	Adam Taylor*	6.92%	188		
DUP	Olive Craig	5.38%	146		
Electorate: 3,877 Valid: 2,716 (70.05%) Spoilt: 41 Quota: 544 Turnout: 2,757 (71.11%)

=== Area B ===
1977: 3 x UUP, 3 x SDLP, 1 x DUP, 1 x Independent
1981: 3 x DUP, 2 x UUP, 2 x SDLP, 1 x Independent
1977-1981 Change: DUP (two seats) gain from UUP and SDLP

Ballymoney Area B - 8 seats
Party	Candidate	FPv%	Count									
Party	Candidate	FPv%	1	2	3	4	5	6	7	8	9	10
DUP	Charles Steele*	16.01%	791									
Independent	Hugh Boyle*	12.45%	615									
UUP	Joe Gaston*	12.06%	596									
SDLP	Harry Connolly*	6.78%	335	335	345.67	350.19	485.17	485.17	495.17	784.17		
SDLP	Edward McClements	7.10%	351	351.62	376.59	477.94	502.04	502.11	506.11	529.17	735.17	
DUP	William Gracey	9.59%	474	511.2	511.42	511.42	511.42	512.75	529.41	531.41	531.41	532.41
UUP	William Logan*	7.33%	362	382.77	384.75	384.86	386.3	413.18	501.02	502.55	503.55	516.55
DUP	Bertie McIlhatton	6.03%	298	457.34	457.56	457.56	457.56	460.64	483.12	485.43	485.43	487.43
UUP	Patricia Ellis*	5.63%	278	284.2	285.08	285.08	285.19	290.44	399.22	399.33	400.33	411.33
SDLP	John Mulholland*	5.48%	271	271.93	276.88	279.31	325.18	325.18	326.6			
UUP	Samuel Barlett	5.28%	261	274.33	275.32	275.32	276.43	281.05				
Independent	Margaret Donnelly	4.29%	212	212	217.94	218.16						
SDLP	Malachy McCamphill	1.96%	97	97.31	109.85							
Electorate: 6,904 Valid: 4,941 (71.57%) Spoilt: 122 Quota: 550 Turnout: 5,063 (73.33%)

=== Area C ===
1977: 2 x Independent, 1 x Alliance, 1 x Independent Unionist
1981: 2 x DUP, 2 x Independent
1977-1981 Change: DUP (two seats) gain from Alliance and Independent Unionist

Ballymoney Area C - 5 seats
Party	Candidate	FPv%	Count				
Party	Candidate	FPv%	1	2	3	4	5
DUP	Cecil Cousley	24.60%	747				
DUP	Ralph Stronge	17.71%	538	540	648.54		
Independent	Mary Holmes*	18.67%	567	589	600.52	753.52	
Independent	Robert McComb*	11.62%	353	379	386.56	511.98	617.98
Alliance	Brendan Smyth*	11.59%	352	435	435.36	462.54	476.54
UUP	James Simpson	10.80%	328	337	342.04		
Independent	Thomas McKenna	5.00%	152				
Electorate: 4,923 Valid: 3,037 (61.69%) Spoilt: 65 Quota: 608 Turnout: 3,102 (63.01%)
