= Ballymoney Area B =

District electoral areas in Ballymoney, Northern Ireland

Ballymoney Area B was one of the three district electoral areas in Ballymoney, Northern Ireland which existed from 1973 to 1985. The district elected eight members to Ballymoney Borough Council, and formed part of the North Antrim constituencies for the Northern Ireland Assembly and UK Parliament.

It was created for the 1973 local elections, and contained the wards of Ballyhoe and Corkey, Benvardin, Castlequarter, Clogh Mills, Derrick, Dunloy, Kilraghts and Stranocum. It was abolished for the 1985 local elections and replaced by the Bann Valley DEA and the Bushvale DEA.

== Councillors ==
Election	Councillor (Party)	Councillor (Party)	Councillor (Party)	Councillor (Party)	Councillor (Party)	Councillor (Party)	Councillor (Party)	Councillor (Party)
1981	Charles Steele (DUP)	William Gracey (DUP)	Bertie McIlhatton (DUP)	Joe Gaston (UUP)/ (Independent Unionist)	William Logan (UUP)/ (Independent Unionist)	Harry Connolly (SDLP)	Edward McClements (SDLP)	Hugh Boyle (Independent)
1977	Charles Steele (DUP)	Daniel McAlonan (SDLP)	Patricia Ellis (UUP)	Joe Gaston (UUP)/ (Independent Unionist)	William Logan (UUP)/ (Independent Unionist)	Harry Connolly (SDLP)	John Mulholland (SDLP)	Hugh Boyle (Independent)
1973	Samuel Montgomery (UUP)	Robert Chestnutt (UUP)	Patricia Ellis (UUP)	Joe Gaston (UUP)/ (Independent Unionist)	William Logan (UUP)/ (Independent Unionist)	Harry Connolly (SDLP)	John Mulholland (SDLP)	Edward McClements (Independent Nationalist)

== 1981 Election ==
1977: 3 x UUP, 3 x SDLP, 1 x DUP, 1 x Independent

1981: 3 x DUP, 2 x UUP, 2 x SDLP, 1 x Independent

1977-1981 Change: DUP (two seats) gain from UUP and SDLP

Ballymoney Area B - 8 seats
Party	Candidate	FPv%	Count									
Party	Candidate	FPv%	1	2	3	4	5	6	7	8	9	10
DUP	Charles Steele*	16.01%	791									
Independent	Hugh Boyle*	12.45%	615									
UUP	Joe Gaston*	12.06%	596									
SDLP	Harry Connolly*	6.78%	335	335	345.67	350.19	485.17	485.17	495.17	784.17		
SDLP	Edward McClements	7.10%	351	351.62	376.59	477.94	502.04	502.11	506.11	529.17	735.17	
DUP	William Gracey	9.59%	474	511.2	511.42	511.42	511.42	512.75	529.41	531.41	531.41	532.41
UUP	William Logan*	7.33%	362	382.77	384.75	384.86	386.3	413.18	501.02	502.55	503.55	516.55
DUP	Bertie McIlhatton	6.03%	298	457.34	457.56	457.56	457.56	460.64	483.12	485.43	485.43	487.43
UUP	Patricia Ellis*	5.63%	278	284.2	285.08	285.08	285.19	290.44	399.22	399.33	400.33	411.33
SDLP	John Mulholland*	5.48%	271	271.93	276.88	279.31	325.18	325.18	326.6			
UUP	Samuel Barlett	5.28%	261	274.33	275.32	275.32	276.43	281.05				
Independent	Margaret Donnelly	4.29%	212	212	217.94	218.16						
SDLP	Malachy McCamphill	1.96%	97	97.31	109.85							
Electorate: 6,904 Valid: 4,941 (71.57%) Spoilt: 122 Quota: 550 Turnout: 5,063 (73.33%)

== 1977 Election ==
1973: 3 x UUP, 2 x SDLP, 2 x Independent Unionist, 1 x Independent Nationalist

1977: 3 x UUP, 3 x SDLP, 1 x DUP, 1 x Independent

1973-1977 Change: DUP, SDLP and Independent gain from UUP (two seats) and Independent Nationalist, Independent Unionists (two seats) join UUP

Ballymoney Area B - 8 seats
Party	Candidate	FPv%	Count				
Party	Candidate	FPv%	1	2	3	4	5
DUP	Charles Steele	18.10%	753				
Independent	Hugh Boyle	14.23%	592				
SDLP	Daniel McAlonan	13.84%	576				
UUP	William Logan*	11.39%	474				
UUP	Joe Gaston*	8.96%	373	464.68			
SDLP	Harry Connolly*	8.82%	367	367	421.6	473.8	
SDLP	John Mulholland*	7.95%	331	331.96	384.74	444.34	445.26
UUP	Patricia Ellis*	7.55%	314	350	355.72	355.72	491.18
UUP	Robert Chestnutt*	5.65%	235	318.04	326.62	326.62	391.2
UUP	Ronald McDowell	3.51%	146	224.24	227.1	227.9	
Electorate: 6,951 Valid: 4,161 (59.86%) Spoilt: 96 Quota: 463 Turnout: 4,257 (61.24%)

== 1973 Election ==
1973: 3 x UUP, 2 x SDLP, 2 x Independent Unionist, 1 x Independent Nationalist

Ballymoney Area B - 8 seats
Party	Candidate	FPv%	Count							
Party	Candidate	FPv%	1	2	3	4	5	6	7	8
Ind. Nationalist	Edward McClements	16.42%	702							
Ind. Unionist	Joe Gaston	14.11%	603							
SDLP	John Mulholland	10.79%	461	573.96						
Ind. Unionist	William Logan	10.34%	442	442.32	519.81					
SDLP	Harry Connolly	8.49%	363	466.36	466.36	556.52				
UUP	Patricia Ellis	9.80%	419	419.32	424.36	424.64	424.64	490.48		
UUP	Samuel Montgomery	7.81%	334	335.28	342.63	342.91	345.39	391.81	441.88	458.13
UUP	Robert Chestnutt	8.12%	347	347	364.22	364.22	364.84	382.58	415.47	435.23
UUP	J. F. Jamison	6.62%	283	283	295.81	295.81	296.43	316.05	356.3	362.41
Alliance	T. Stuart	3.93%	168	172.16	173.21	179.09	255.35	255.56		
UUP	J. G. Lyons	3.56%	152	152.32	154.84	154.84	155.46			
Electorate: 7,161 Valid: 4,274 (59.68%) Spoilt: 72 Quota: 475 Turnout: 4,346 (60.69%)
