= Ballymoney Area A =

District electoral areas in Ballymoney, Northern Ireland

Ballymoney Area A was one of the three district electoral areas in Ballymoney, Northern Ireland which existed from 1973 to 1985. The district elected four members to Ballymoney Borough Council, and formed part of the North Antrim constituencies for the Northern Ireland Assembly and UK Parliament.

It was created for the 1973 local elections, and contained the wards of Killoquin Lower, Killoquin Upper, Seacon and The Vow. It was abolished for the 1985 local elections and replaced by the Bann Valley DEA.

== Councillors ==
Election	Councillor (Party)	Councillor (Party)	Councillor (Party)	Councillor (Party)
1981	Robert Halliday (DUP)	James Patterson (DUP)	Kenneth Bamford (UUP)/ (Independent Unionist)	Hugh McFarland (Alliance)
1977	Robert Halliday (DUP)	Ralph Stronge (DUP)	Kenneth Bamford (UUP)/ (Independent Unionist)	Adam Taylor (UUP)
1973	David Hanna (DUP)	W. Campbell (Independent)	Kenneth Bamford (UUP)/ (Independent Unionist)	R. D. Gilmour (UUP)

== 1981 Election ==
1977: 2 x DUP, 2 x UUP

1981: 2 x DUP, 1 x UUP, 1 x Alliance

1977-1981 Change: Alliance gain from UUP

Ballymoney Area A - 4 seats
Party	Candidate	FPv%	Count		
Party	Candidate	FPv%	1	2	3
DUP	Robert Halliday*	21.17%	575		
UUP	Kenneth Bamford*	14.87%	404	666	
Alliance	Hugh McFarland	19.00%	516	525	567
DUP	James Patterson	17.82%	484	512	544
DUP	Robert Wilson	14.84%	403	423	441
UUP	Adam Taylor*	6.92%	188		
DUP	Olive Craig	5.38%	146		
Electorate: 3,877 Valid: 2,716 (70.05%) Spoilt: 41 Quota: 544 Turnout: 2,757 (71.11%)

== 1977 Election ==
1973: 1 x DUP, 1 x UUP, 1 x Independent Unionist, 1 x Independent

1977: 2 x DUP, 2 x UUP

1973-1977 Change: DUP gain from Independent, Independent Unionist joins UUP

Ballymoney Area A - 4 seats
Party	Candidate	FPv%	Count				
Party	Candidate	FPv%	1	2	3	4	5
DUP	Robert Halliday	21.05%	430				
UUP	Kenneth Bamford*	16.10%	329	372	372.36	395.36	411.36
DUP	Ralph Stronge	10.96%	224	240	250.68	250.68	443.68
UUP	Adam Taylor	13.71%	280	372	372.44	372.44	378.24
Alliance	Hugh McFarland	10.18%	208	212	212.04	369.04	370.04
DUP	David Hanna*	10.47%	214	216	221.6	223.6	
Independent	Henry McCloy	9.69%	198	198	198		
UUP	James Taylor	7.83%	160				
Electorate: 4,037 Valid: 2,043 (50.61%) Spoilt: 75 Quota: 409 Turnout: 2,118 (52.46%)

== 1973 Election ==
1973: 1 x DUP, 1 x UUP, 1 x Independent Unionist, 1 x Independent

Ballymoney Area A - 4 seats
Party	Candidate	FPv%	Count				
Party	Candidate	FPv%	1	2	3	4	5
Ind. Unionist	Kenneth Bamford	22.59%	453				
UUP	R. D. Gilmour	17.06%	342	352.67	418.67		
DUP	David Hanna	19.25%	386	389.41	401.41	402.66	
Independent	W. Campbell	9.18%	184	210.51	226.26	237.76	374.36
DUP	T. Milligan	15.01%	301	303.64	316.64	317.64	347.08
Independent	T. L. McElderry	10.32%	207	209.64	230.97	233.47	
Independent	M. A. Hunter	6.58%	132	135.08			
Electorate: 3,947 Valid: 2,005 (50.80%) Spoilt: 29 Quota: 402 Turnout: 2,034 (51.53%)
