= 1977 Ballymoney Borough Council election =

Local government election in Northern Ireland

← 1973	18 May 1977	1981 →

All 16 seats to Ballymoney Borough Council 9 seats needed for a majority
	First party	Second party	Third party
Party	UUP	DUP	Independent
Seats won	5	3	3
Seat change	▲1	▲2	0
	Fourth party	Fifth party	Sixth party
Party	SDLP	Alliance	Ind. Unionist
Seats won	3	1	1
Seat change	▲1	0	▼3
	Seventh party
Party	Ind. Nationalist
Seats won	0
Seat change	▼1

Elections to Ballymoney Borough Council were held on 18 May 1977 on the same day as the other Northern Irish local government elections. The election used three district electoral areas to elect a total of 16 councillors.

== Election results ==
Ballymoney Borough Council Election Result 1977
Party	Seats	Gains	Losses	Net gain/loss	Seats %	Votes %	Votes	+/−
UUP	5	1	0	▲1	31.3	29.4	2,479	▼3.9
DUP	3	2	0	▲2	18.8	19.2	1,621	▲11.4
Independent	3	1	1	0	18.8	24.8	2,087	▲3.5
SDLP	3	1	0	▲1	18.8	15.1	1,274	▲5.8
Alliance	1	0	0	0	6.3	8.3	698	▼0.6
Ind. Unionist	0	0	1	▼1	0.0	3.2	270	▼18.3

Note: "Votes" are the first preference votes.

== Districts summary ==
Results of the Ballymoney Borough Council election, 1977 by district
Ward	%	Cllrs	%	Cllrs	%	Cllrs	%	Cllrs	%	Cllrs	Total Cllrs
Ward	UUP		DUP		SDLP		Alliance		Others		Total Cllrs
Area A	37.6	2	42.5	2	0.0	0	10.2	0	9.7	0	4
Area B	37.1	3	18.1	1	30.6	3	0.0	0	14.2	1	8
Area C	7.6	0	0.0	0	0.0	0	22.0	0	70.4	3	4
Total	29.4	5	19.2	3	15.1	3	8.3	1	28.0	4	16

== Districts results ==
=== Area A ===
1973: 1 x DUP, 1 x UUP, 1 x Independent Unionist, 1 x Independent
1977: 2 x DUP, 2 x UUP
1973-1977 Change: DUP gain from Independent, Independent Unionist joins UUP

Ballymoney Area A - 4 seats
Party	Candidate	FPv%	Count				
Party	Candidate	FPv%	1	2	3	4	5
DUP	Robert Halliday	21.05%	430				
UUP	Kenneth Bamford*	16.10%	329	372	372.36	395.36	411.36
DUP	Ralph Stronge	10.96%	224	240	250.68	250.68	443.68
UUP	Adam Taylor	13.71%	280	372	372.44	372.44	378.24
Alliance	Hugh McFarland	10.18%	208	212	212.04	369.04	370.04
DUP	David Hanna*	10.47%	214	216	221.6	223.6	
Independent	Henry McCloy	9.69%	198	198	198		
UUP	James Taylor	7.83%	160				
Electorate: 4,037 Valid: 2,043 (50.61%) Spoilt: 75 Quota: 409 Turnout: 2,118 (52.46%)

=== Area B ===
1973: 3 x UUP, 2 x SDLP, 2 x Independent Unionist, 1 x Independent Nationalist
1977: 3 x UUP, 3 x SDLP, 1 x DUP, 1 x Independent
1973-1977 Change: DUP, SDLP and Independent gain from UUP (two seats) and Independent Nationalist, Independent Unionists (two seats) join UUP

Ballymoney Area B - 8 seats
Party	Candidate	FPv%	Count				
Party	Candidate	FPv%	1	2	3	4	5
DUP	Charles Steele	18.10%	753				
Independent	Hugh Boyle	14.23%	592				
SDLP	Daniel McAlonan	13.84%	576				
UUP	William Logan*	11.39%	474				
UUP	Joe Gaston*	8.96%	373	464.68			
SDLP	Harry Connolly*	8.82%	367	367	421.6	473.8	
SDLP	John Mulholland*	7.95%	331	331.96	384.74	444.34	445.26
UUP	Patricia Ellis*	7.55%	314	350	355.72	355.72	491.18
UUP	Robert Chestnutt*	5.65%	235	318.04	326.62	326.62	391.2
UUP	Ronald McDowell	3.51%	146	224.24	227.1	227.9	
Electorate: 6,951 Valid: 4,161 (59.86%) Spoilt: 96 Quota: 463 Turnout: 4,257 (61.24%)

=== Area C ===
1973: 2 x Independent, 1 x Alliance, 1 x Independent Unionist
1977: 2 x Independent, 1 x Alliance, 1 x Independent Unionist
1973-1977 Change: No change

Ballymoney Area C - 5 seats
Party	Candidate	FPv%	Count			
Party	Candidate	FPv%	1	2	3	4
Independent	Robert McComb*	39.33%	875			
Independent	Mary Holmes*	16.40%	365	526		
Alliance	Brendan Smyth*	18.20%	405	440.36	448.72	
Ind. Unionist	Frederick Holland*	12.13%	270	326.16	377.08	450.06
UUP	Samuel Montgomery	7.55%	168	240.8	294.76	343.44
Independent	Ernest Lee	2.56%	57	93.4	115.44	
Alliance	John Greer	3.82%	85	92.28	96.84	
Electorate: 4,382 Valid: 2,225 (50.78%) Spoilt: 73 Quota: 446 Turnout: 2,298 (52.44%)
