= Bann Valley (District Electoral Area) =

District electoral areas in Ballymoney, Northern Ireland

Bann Valley DEA (1993-2014) within Ballymoney

Bann Valley was one of the three district electoral areas in Ballymoney, Northern Ireland which existed from 1985 to 2014. The district elected six members to Ballymoney Borough Council, and formed part of the North Antrim constituencies for the Northern Ireland Assembly and UK Parliament.

It was created for the 1985 local elections, replacing Ballymoney Area A and Ballymoney Area B which had existed since 1973, and contained the wards of Clough Mills, Dunloy, Killoquin Lower, Killoquin Upper, Seacon and The Vow. It was abolished for the 2014 local elections and most of the area was moved to the Ballymoney DEA.

== Councillors ==
Election	Councillor (Party)	Councillor (Party)	Councillor (Party)	Councillor (Party)	Councillor (Party)	Councillor (Party)
2011	Philip McGuigan (Sinn Féin)	Cathal McLaughlin (Sinn Féin)	William Blair (TUV)	Robert Halliday (DUP)	Jason Atkinson (DUP)	John Finlay (DUP)
2005	Philip McGuigan (Sinn Féin)	Daithí McKay (Sinn Féin)	Malachy McCamphill (SDLP)	Audrey Patterson (DUP)	Robert Wilson (DUP)	John Finlay (DUP)
2001	Philip McGuigan (Sinn Féin)	Joe Gaston (UUP)	Malachy McCamphill (SDLP)	Robert Halliday (DUP)	Robert Wilson (DUP)	John Finlay (DUP)
1997	Martin O'Neill (Sinn Féin)	Joe Gaston (UUP)	Malachy McCamphill (SDLP)	Robert Halliday (DUP)	Robert Wilson (DUP)	John Watt (UUP)
1993	Charley O'Kane (SDLP)	Joe Gaston (UUP)	Malachy McCamphill (SDLP)	Robert Halliday (DUP)	Robert Wilson (DUP)	John Watt (UUP)
1989	Charley O'Kane (SDLP)	Joe Gaston (UUP)	Malachy McCamphill (SDLP)	Robert Halliday (DUP)	Robert Wilson (DUP)	John Watt (UUP)
1985	Margaret Hogan (Sinn Féin)	Joe Gaston (UUP)	Malachy McCamphill (SDLP)	James Patterson (DUP)	Robert Wilson (DUP)	Kenneth Bamford (UUP)

== Elections ==
=== 2011 Election ===
2005: 3 x DUP, 2 x Sinn Féin, 1 x SDLP

2011: 3 x DUP, 2 x Sinn Féin, 1 x TUV

2005-2011 Change: TUV gain from SDLP

Bann Valley - 6 seats
Party	Candidate	FPv%	Count							
Party	Candidate	FPv%	1	2	3	4	5	6	7	8
DUP	John Finlay*	18.50%	905							
Sinn Féin	Philip McGuigan*	17.91%	876							
DUP	Robert Halliday	11.72%	573	706.63						
DUP	Jason Atkinson	12.08%	591	633.32	633.32	638.34	779.34			
Sinn Féin	Cathal McLaughlin	9.06%	443	443.46	580.06	580.07	580.07	580.07	876.07	
TUV	William Blair	9.00%	440	456.33	456.33	456.64	553.41	604.41	606.84	607.84
SDLP	Malachy McCamphill*	7.63%	373	374.15	394.95	395	432.46	446.46	486.26	557.26
Sinn Féin	Leanne Peacock	7.05%	345	345.23	359.83	359.83	360.03	360.03		
UUP	Steven Phillips	7.05%	345	352.36	352.56	352.74				
Electorate: 8,473 Valid: 4,891 (57.72%) Spoilt: 123 Quota: 699 Turnout: 5,104 (60.24%)

=== 2005 Election ===
2001: 3 x DUP, 1 x Sinn Féin, 1 x SDLP, 1 x UUP

2005: 3 x DUP, 2 x Sinn Féin, 1 x SDLP

2001-2005 Change: Sinn Féin gain from UUP

Bann Valley - 6 seats
Party	Candidate	FPv%	Count			
Party	Candidate	FPv%	1	2	3	4
Sinn Féin	Philip McGuigan*	20.43%	1,062			
DUP	John Finlay*	15.30%	795			
Sinn Féin	Daithí McKay	13.26%	689	945.5		
DUP	Robert Wilson*	14.24%	740	740	740	740
DUP	Audrey Patterson	13.76%	715	715	715	715
SDLP	Malachy McCamphill*	7.54%	392	420.2	484.1	704.9
UUP	Joe Gaston*	12.43%	646	646.3	646.9	649.5
SDLP	Charley O'Kane	3.04%	158	182.9	275	
Electorate: 7,643 Valid: 5,197 (68.00%) Spoilt: 100 Quota: 743 Turnout: 5,297 (69.31%)

=== 2001 Election ===
1997: 2 x DUP, 2 x UUP, 1 x SDLP, 1 x Sinn Féin

2001: 3 x DUP, 1 x Sinn Féin, 1 x SDLP, 1 x UUP

1997-2001 Change: DUP gain from UUP

Bann Valley - 6 seats
Party	Candidate	FPv%	Count				
Party	Candidate	FPv%	1	2	3	4	5
Sinn Féin	Philip McGuigan	21.51%	1,123				
DUP	John Finlay	16.46%	859				
SDLP	Malachy McCamphill*	12.70%	663	803.8			
UUP	Joe Gaston*	13.62%	711	712.2	926.2		
DUP	Robert Halliday*	12.93%	675	675.8	687.8	753.8	
DUP	Robert Wilson*	10.34%	540	540	556	611	717.68
SDLP	Charley O'Kane	7.43%	388	614.4	617.4	629.4	629.68
UUP	John Watt*	5.00%	261	261.4			
Electorate: 7,451 Valid: 5,220 (70.06%) Spoilt: 122 Quota: 746 Turnout: 5,342 (71.70%)

=== 1997 Election ===
1993: 2 x DUP, 2 x UUP, 2 x SDLP

1997: 2 x DUP, 2 x UUP, 1 x SDLP, 1 x Sinn Féin

1993-1997 Change: Sinn Féin gain from SDLP

Bann Valley - 6 seats
Party	Candidate	FPv%	Count						
Party	Candidate	FPv%	1	2	3	4	5	6	7
UUP	Joe Gaston*	18.09%	719						
SDLP	Malachy McCamphill*	17.76%	706						
DUP	Robert Halliday*	15.30%	608						
DUP	Robert Wilson*	11.09%	441	454.44	454.63	482.35	743.35		
UUP	John Watt*	6.54%	260	382.85	382.85	385.07	463.49	578.49	
Sinn Féin	Martin O'Neill	12.78%	508	508.21	519.42	519.42	519.42	519.42	519.42
SDLP	Mary McPoland	9.61%	382	382	502.27	502.27	503.27	503.27	504.27
DUP	John Finlay	8.83%	351	361.29	361.29	367.11			
Electorate: 6,991 Valid: 3,975 (56.86%) Spoilt: 80 Quota: 568 Turnout: 4,055 (58.00%)

=== 1993 Election ===
1989: 2 x DUP, 2 x UUP, 2 x SDLP

1993: 2 x DUP, 2 x UUP, 2 x SDLP

1989-1993 Change: No change

Bann Valley - 6 seats
Party	Candidate	FPv%	Count						
Party	Candidate	FPv%	1	2	3	4	5	6	7
UUP	Joe Gaston*	23.48%	865						
DUP	Robert Halliday*	16.80%	619						
SDLP	Charley O'Kane*	16.64%	613						
UUP	John Watt*	8.47%	312	592.8					
DUP	Robert Wilson*	12.54%	462	493.2	547.65				
SDLP	Malachy McCamphill*	9.39%	346	348	348.15	423.75	426.48	426.48	583.78
DUP	Daniel Taylor	4.86%	179	198.2	231.5	231.5	293.03	311.33	311.33
Sinn Féin	Pearse McMahon	7.82%	288	288.4	288.4	297.25	297.25	297.25	
Electorate: 6,638 Valid: 3,684 (55.50%) Spoilt: 80 Quota: 527 Turnout: 3,764 (56.70%)

=== 1989 Election ===
1985: 2 x DUP, 2 x UUP, 1 x SDLP, 1 x Sinn Féin

1989: 2 x DUP, 2 x UUP, 2 x SDLP

1985-1989 Change: SDLP gain from Sinn Féin

Bann Valley - 6 seats
Party	Candidate	FPv%	Count			
Party	Candidate	FPv%	1	2	3	4
UUP	Joe Gaston*	21.21%	790			
DUP	Robert Halliday	19.06%	710			
UUP	John Watt	9.56%	356	558.95		
DUP	Robert Wilson*	11.52%	429	457.05	570.3	
SDLP	Malachy McCamphill*	12.08%	450	452.31	452.56	455.47
SDLP	Charley O'Kane	11.54%	430	430	430.25	431
Sinn Féin	Una Casey	9.80%	365	365.33	365.58	365.58
DUP	Daniel Taylor	5.23%	195	216.45	273.2	
Electorate: 6,284 Valid: 3,725 (59.28%) Spoilt: 91 Quota: 533 Turnout: 3,816 (60.73%)

=== 1985 Election ===
1985: 2 x DUP, 2 x UUP, 1 x SDLP, 1 x Sinn Féin

Bann Valley - 6 seats
Party	Candidate	FPv%	Count				
Party	Candidate	FPv%	1	2	3	4	5
DUP	James Patterson*	16.96%	669				
DUP	Robert Wilson*	12.27%	484	564.1			
SDLP	Malachy McCamphill	13.94%	550	550.15	712.15		
Sinn Féin	Margaret Hogan	13.49%	532	532	557.15	622.15	
UUP	Kenneth Bamford*	12.34%	487	491.8	524.95	556.95	567.95
UUP	Joe Gaston*	12.72%	502	505.9	518.05	522.05	522.05
DUP	Robert Halliday*	11.99%	473	483.2	487.35	487.35	490.35
Alliance	Hugh McFarland*	6.29%	248	248.75			
Electorate: 5,997 Valid: 3,945 (65.78%) Spoilt: 57 Quota: 564 Turnout: 4,002 (66.73%)
