= Bushvale (District Electoral Area) =

District electoral areas in Ballymoney, Northern Ireland

Bushvale DEA (1993-2014) within Ballymoney

Bushvale was one of the three district electoral areas in Ballymoney, Northern Ireland which existed from 1985 to 2014. The district elected five members to Ballymoney Borough Council, and formed part of the North Antrim constituencies for the Northern Ireland Assembly and UK Parliament.

It was created for the 1985 local elections, replacing Ballymoney Area B that had existed since 1973, and contained the wards of Ballyhoe and Corkey, Benvardin, Dervock, Knockaholet and Stranocum. It was abolished for the 2014 local elections and divided between the Ballymoney DEA and The Glens DEA.

== Councillors ==
Election	Councillor (Party)	Councillor (Party)	Councillor (Party)	Councillor (Party)	Councillor (Party)
2011	Harry Connolly (SDLP)	Anita Cavlan (Sinn Féin)	Evelyne Robinson (DUP)	Frank Campbell (DUP)	Bill Kennedy (UUP)/ (Independent)/ (DUP)
2005	Harry Connolly (SDLP)	Anita Cavlan (Sinn Féin)	Evelyne Robinson (DUP)	Frank Campbell (DUP)	Bill Kennedy (UUP)/ (Independent)/ (DUP)
2001	Harry Connolly (SDLP)	John Ramsay (UUP)	William Logan (UUP)	Frank Campbell (DUP)	Bill Kennedy (UUP)/ (Independent)/ (DUP)
1997	Harry Connolly (SDLP)	Francis McCluskey (SDLP)	William Logan (UUP)	Frank Campbell (DUP)	Bill Kennedy (UUP)/ (Independent)/ (DUP)
1993	Harry Connolly (SDLP)	John Ramsay (UUP)	William Logan (UUP)	Frank Campbell (DUP)	Bill Kennedy (UUP)/ (Independent)/ (DUP)
1989	Harry Connolly (SDLP)	John Ramsay (UUP)	William Logan (UUP)	Donald McKenzie (DUP)	Bill Kennedy (UUP)/ (Independent)/ (DUP)
1985	Harry Connolly (SDLP)	John Ramsay (UUP)	William Logan (UUP)	Charles Steele (DUP)	William Gracey (DUP)

== 2011 Election ==
2005: 2 x DUP, 1 x Sinn Féin, 1 x SDLP, 1 x Independent

2011: 2 x DUP, 1 x UUP, 1 x Sinn Féin, 1 x SDLP

2005-2011 Change: Independent joins UUP

Bushvale - 5 seats
Party	Candidate	FPv%	Count					
Party	Candidate	FPv%	1	2	3	4	5	6
DUP	Evelyne Robinson*	22.18%	767					
DUP	Frank Campbell*	17.32%	599					
UUP	Bill Kennedy*	15.38%	532	633.85				
Sinn Féin	Anita Cavlan*	14.57%	504	504.7	504.94	641.94		
SDLP	Harry Connolly*	13.13%	454	457.85	458.09	492.09	495.68	558.92
UUP	William Johnston	6.48%	224	275.45	326.09	326.79	446.21	447.45
TUV	Peter Deans	5.84%	202	229.3	232.66	232.9		
Sinn Féin	Jimmy Gaston	5.09%	176	177.05	177.53			
Electorate: 6,196 Valid: 3,458 (55.81%) Spoilt: 50 Quota: 577 Turnout: 3,508 (56.62%)

== 2005 Election ==
2001: 2 x DUP, 2 x UUP, 1 x SDLP

2005: 2 x DUP, 1 x Sinn Féin, 1 x SDLP, 1 x Independent

2001-2005 Change: Sinn Féin and DUP gain from UUP (two seats), Independent leaves DUP

Bushvale - 5 seats
Party	Candidate	FPv%	Count					
Party	Candidate	FPv%	1	2	3	4	5	6
Sinn Féin	Anita Cavlan	19.55%	711					
DUP	Frank Campbell*	15.76%	573					
DUP	Evelyne Robinson	14.63%	532	532	544	582	788.78	
SDLP	Harry Connolly*	13.92%	506	602.48	604.48	606.48	606.48	606.48
Independent	Bill Kennedy*	13.01%	473	474.92	520.92	533.92	538.82	591.74
UUP	William Johnston	7.54%	274	274.32	447.32	470.32	477.18	540.88
DUP	Robert Holmes	8.20%	298	298	303			
UUP	William Logan*	7.40%	269	269.16				
Electorate: 5,692 Valid: 3,636 (63.88%) Spoilt: 60 Quota: 607 Turnout: 3,696 (64.93%)

== 2001 Election ==
1997: 2 x DUP, 2 x SDLP, 1 x UUP

2001: 2 x DUP, 2 x UUP, 1 x SDLP

1997-2001 Change: UUP gain from SDLP

Bushvale - 5 seats
Party	Candidate	FPv%	Count		
Party	Candidate	FPv%	1	2	3
DUP	Bill Kennedy*	27.66%	997		
DUP	Frank Campbell*	16.34%	589	931.35	
UUP	John Ramsay	15.12%	545	567.14	664.72
UUP	William Logan*	12.68%	457	481.6	614.85
SDLP	Harry Connolly*	15.20%	548	550.05	553.74
Sinn Féin	Sean McErlain	8.82%	318	318	318
SDLP	Francis McCluskey*	4.19%	151	151.41	151.82
Electorate: 5,639 Valid: 3,605 (63.93%) Spoilt: 76 Quota: 601 Turnout: 3,681 (65.28%)

== 1997 Election ==
1993: 2 x DUP, 2 x UUP, 1 x SDLP

1997: 2 x DUP, 2 x SDLP, 1 x UUP

1993-1997 Change: SDLP gain from UUP

Bushvale - 5 seats
Party	Candidate	FPv%	Count						
Party	Candidate	FPv%	1	2	3	4	5	6	7
SDLP	Harry Connolly*	26.17%	725						
DUP	Frank Campbell*	17.08%	473						
DUP	Bill Kennedy*	15.99%	443	443.38	450.5	455.52	491.52		
UUP	William Logan*	12.64%	350	351.52	351.98	356.76	456.68	473.68	
SDLP	Francis McCluskey	6.53%	181	429.14	429.16	445.96	445.98	445.98	445.98
UUP	John Ramsay*	12.31%	341	341	341.56	346.56	425.28	433.28	444.92
UUP	William Johnston	8.01%	222	222.76	223.88	225.88			
NI Women's Coalition	Joan Cosgrove	1.26%	35	42.6	42.64				
Electorate: 5,387 Valid: 2,770 (51.42%) Spoilt: 49 Quota: 462 Turnout: 2,819 (52.33%)

== 1993 Election ==
1989: 2 x UUP, 2 x DUP, 1 x SDLP

1993: 2 x UUP, 2 x DUP, 1 x SDLP

1989-1993 Change: No change

Bushvale - 5 seats
Party	Candidate	FPv%	Count		
Party	Candidate	FPv%	1	2	3
SDLP	Harry Connolly*	27.83%	752		
DUP	Frank Campbell	18.13%	490		
UUP	William Logan*	16.06%	434	551	
DUP	Bill Kennedy*	14.62%	395	421	425
UUP	John Ramsay*	14.25%	385	406	439
UUP	William Johnston	9.10%	246	341	383
Electorate: 5,200 Valid: 2,702 (51.96%) Spoilt: 74 Quota: 451 Turnout: 2,776 (53.38%)

== 1989 Election ==
1985: 2 x UUP, 2 x DUP, 1 x SDLP

1989: 2 x UUP, 2 x DUP, 1 x SDLP

1985-1989 Change: No change

Bushvale - 5 seats
Party	Candidate	FPv%	Count	
Party	Candidate	FPv%	1	2
UUP	John Ramsay*	21.18%	575	
UUP	William Logan*	19.63%	533	
SDLP	Harry Connolly*	19.19%	521	
DUP	Bill Kennedy	18.31%	497	
DUP	Donald McKenzie	13.04%	354	474.32
Sinn Féin	Malachy Carey	8.66%	235	235
Electorate: 4,942 Valid: 2,715 (54.94%) Spoilt: 59 Quota: 453 Turnout: 2,774 (56.13%)

== 1985 Election ==
1985: 2 x UUP, 2 x DUP, 1 x SDLP

Bushvale - 5 seats
Party	Candidate	FPv%	Count						
Party	Candidate	FPv%	1	2	3	4	5	6	7
DUP	Charles Steele*	19.18%	570						
DUP	William Gracey*	18.74%	557						
UUP	John Ramsay	16.96%	504						
SDLP	Harry Connolly*	14.97%	445	445.13	445.46	445.48	453.48	680.48	
UUP	William Logan*	14.57%	433	447.3	453.02	457.4	471.62	471.63	522.63
DUP	Bertie McIlhatton*	6.66%	198	255.46	306.39	306.77	311	311.13	318.13
SDLP	John Mulholland	7.74%	230	230.39	230.61	230.62	231.62		
Green (NI)	William Hartin	1.18%	35	35	35.77	35.78			
Electorate: 4,883 Valid: 2,972 (60.86%) Spoilt: 71 Quota: 496 Turnout: 3,043 (62.32%)
