= 1973 Ballymoney District Council election =

Local government election in Northern Ireland

1973 Ballymoney Borough Council election
30 May 1973	1977 →

All 16 seats to Ballymoney Borough Council 9 seats needed for a majority
	First party	Second party	Third party
Party	UUP	Ind. Unionist	Independent
Seats won	4	4	3
	Fourth party	Fifth party	Sixth party
Party	SDLP	DUP	Alliance
Seats won	2	1	1
	Seventh party
Party	Ind. Nationalist
Seats won	1

Elections to Ballymoney Borough Council were held on 30 May 1973 on the same day as the other Northern Irish local government elections. The election used three district electoral areas to elect a total of 16 councillors.

== Election results ==
Party	Seats	±	First Pref. votes	FPv%	±%
UUP	4		2,933	33.3%	
Ind. Unionist	4		1,898	21.5%	
Independent	3		1,877	21.3%	
SDLP	2		824	9.3%	
Ind. Nationalist	1		702	8.0%	
DUP	1		687	7.8%	
Alliance	1		679	7.7%	
Totals	16		8,815	100.0%	—

== Districts summary ==
Results of the Ballymoney Borough Council election, 1973 by district
Ward	%	Cllrs	%	Cllrs	%	Cllrs	%	Cllrs	%	Cllrs	Total Cllrs
Ward	UUP		SDLP		DUP		Alliance		Others		Total Cllrs
Area A	17.1	1	0.0	0	34.2	1	0.0	0	48.7	2	4
Area B	35.9	3	19.3	2	0.0	0	3.9	0	40.9	3	8
Area C	1.7	0	0.0	0	0.0	0	20.1	1	78.2	3	4
Total	33.3	4	9.3	2	7.8	1	7.7	1	41.9	8	16

== Districts results ==
=== Area A ===
1973: 1 x DUP, 1 x UUP, 1 x Independent Unionist, 1 x Independent

Ballymoney Area A - 4 seats
Party	Candidate	FPv%	Count				
Party	Candidate	FPv%	1	2	3	4	5
Ind. Unionist	Kenneth Bamford	22.59%	453				
UUP	R. D. Gilmour	17.06%	342	352.67	418.67		
DUP	David Hanna	19.25%	386	389.41	401.41	402.66	
Independent	W. Campbell	9.18%	184	210.51	226.26	237.76	374.36
DUP	T. Milligan	15.01%	301	303.64	316.64	317.64	347.08
Independent	T. L. McElderry	10.32%	207	209.64	230.97	233.47	
Independent	M. A. Hunter	6.58%	132	135.08			
Electorate: 3,947 Valid: 2,005 (50.80%) Spoilt: 29 Quota: 402 Turnout: 2,034 (51.53%)

=== Area B ===
1973: 3 x UUP, 2 x SDLP, 2 x Independent Unionist, 1 x Independent Nationalist

Ballymoney Area B - 8 seats
Party	Candidate	FPv%	Count							
Party	Candidate	FPv%	1	2	3	4	5	6	7	8
Ind. Nationalist	Edward McClements	16.42%	702							
Ind. Unionist	Joe Gaston	14.11%	603							
SDLP	John Mulholland	10.79%	461	573.96						
Ind. Unionist	William Logan	10.34%	442	442.32	519.81					
SDLP	Harry Connolly	8.49%	363	466.36	466.36	556.52				
UUP	Patricia Ellis	9.80%	419	419.32	424.36	424.64	424.64	490.48		
UUP	Samuel Montgomery	7.81%	334	335.28	342.63	342.91	345.39	391.81	441.88	458.13
UUP	Robert Chestnutt	8.12%	347	347	364.22	364.22	364.84	382.58	415.47	435.23
UUP	J. F. Jamison	6.62%	283	283	295.81	295.81	296.43	316.05	356.3	362.41
Alliance	T. Stuart	3.93%	168	172.16	173.21	179.09	255.35	255.56		
UUP	J. G. Lyons	3.56%	152	152.32	154.84	154.84	155.46			
Electorate: 7,161 Valid: 4,274 (59.68%) Spoilt: 72 Quota: 475 Turnout: 4,346 (60.69%)

=== Area C ===
1973: 2 x Independent, 1 x Alliance, 1 x Independent Unionist

Ballymoney Area C - 5 seats
Party	Candidate	FPv%	Count				
Party	Candidate	FPv%	1	2	3	4	5
Independent	Robert McComb	29.69%	753				
Independent	Mary Holmes	14.16%	359	438.56	482.78	502.2	579.2
Alliance	Brendan Smyth	14.83%	376	390.96	395.64	496.36	516.36
Ind. Unionist	Frederick Holland	15.77%	400	436.72	456.76	466.12	514.76
UUP	James Simpson	10.69%	271	301.6	325.08	334.42	377.98
Independent	G. S. H. Hughes	5.95%	151	191.8	210.28	222.3	
Alliance	J. A. Scott	5.32%	135	144.18	152.88		
Independent	J. Pollock	3.59%	91	121.94			
Electorate: 4,073 Valid: 2,536 (62.26%) Spoilt: 22 Quota: 508 Turnout: 2,558 (62.80%)
