= Ballymena (borough) =

District of Northern Ireland (1973–2015)

Coordinates: 54°51′47.78″N 6°17′3.36″W

Ballymena Borough
- Area: 632 km^{2} (244 sq mi); Ranked 8th of 26
- District HQ: Ballymena
- Catholic: 22.6%
- Protestant: 71.4%
- Country: Northern Ireland
- Sovereign state: United Kingdom
- Councillors: MLAs North Antrim DUP: 2 Sinn Féin: 1 TUV: 1 UUP: 1; MPs Ian Paisley Jr (DUP)
- Website: www.ballymena.gov.uk

Ballymena is a former local government district with borough status in Northern Ireland. It was one of twenty-six districts created on 1 October 1973 and covered the town of Ballymena and the surrounding area which includes small towns including Broughshane, Cullybackey, Galgorm, Ahoghill and Portglenone. The borough had an area of 200 square miles (520 km^{2}) and a population of 64,044 according to the 2011 census. The borough had a central location within Northern Ireland and was served by the M2 motorway and with a station on the Belfast-Derry/Londonderry railway line. Belfast International Airport itself was only 18 miles (29 km) away and the Belfast City Airport is 30 miles (48 km) from Ballymena. It was also accessible to the seaports of Larne and Belfast, 20 and 27 miles (43 km) away respectively. As of 2015 it has been replaced by Mid and East Antrim Borough Council.

== Parliamentary and assembly representation ==
Together with the neighbouring Borough of Ballymoney and part of the District of Moyle, it formed the North Antrim constituency for elections to the Westminster Parliament and Northern Ireland Assembly.

== See also ==
- Local government in Northern Ireland
