= 1985 Ballymoney Borough Council election =

Local government election in Northern Ireland

← 1981	15 May 1985	1989 →

All 16 seats to Ballymoney Borough Council 9 seats needed for a majority
	First party	Second party	Third party
Party	DUP	UUP	SDLP
Seats won	6	6	2
Seat change	▼1	▲3	0
	Fourth party	Fifth party	Sixth party
Party	Sinn Féin	Independent	Alliance
Seats won	1	1	0
Seat change	▲1	▼2	▼1

Elections to Ballymoney Borough Council were held on 15 May 1985 on the same day as the other Northern Irish local government elections. The election used three district electoral areas to elect a total of 16 councillors.

== Election results ==
Ballymoney Borough Council Election Result 1985
Party	Seats	Gains	Losses	Net gain/loss	Seats %	Votes %	Votes	+/−
DUP	6	0	1	▼1	37.5	41.9	4,044	▲1.6
UUP	6	3	0	▲3	37.5	29.9	2,886	▲5.9
SDLP	2	0	0	0	12.5	12.7	1,225	▲2.8
Independent	1	0	2	▼2	6.3	7.1	687	▼10.7
Sinn Féin	1	1	0	▲1	6.3	5.5	532	New
Alliance	0	0	1	▼1	0.0	2.6	248	▼5.5
Green (NI)	0	0	0	0	0.0	0.3	35	New

Note: "Votes" are the first preference votes.

== Districts summary ==
Results of the Ballymoney Borough Council election, 1985 by district
Ward	%	Cllrs	%	Cllrs	%	Cllrs	%	Cllrs	%	Cllrs	Total Cllrs
Ward	DUP		UUP		SDLP		Sinn Féin		Others		Total Cllrs
Ballymoney Town	39.9	2	35.0	2	0.0	0	0.0	0	25.1	1	5
Bann Valley	41.2	2	25.1	2	13.9	1	13.5	1	6.3	0	6
Bushvale	44.6	2	31.5	2	22.7	1	0.0	0	1.2	0	5
Total	41.9	6	29.9	6	12.7	2	5.5	1	10.0	1	16

== District results ==
=== Ballymoney Town ===
1985: 2 x DUP, 2 x UUP, 1 x Independent

Ballymoney Town - 5 seats
Party	Candidate	FPv%	Count				
Party	Candidate	FPv%	1	2	3	4	5
Independent	Robert McComb*	25.07%	687				
UUP	James Simpson	16.53%	453	502.45			
DUP	Cecil Cousley*	15.47%	424	457.97			
DUP	Kenneth Blair	13.87%	380	395.91	396.77	613.77	
UUP	Adam McNeilly	10.00%	274	326.03	347.53	381.12	430.12
UUP	James McKeown	8.50%	233	293.63	311.69	345.99	412.99
DUP	Ralph Stronge*	10.55%	289	304.05	307.06		
Electorate: 5,278 Valid: 2,740 (51.91%) Spoilt: 63 Quota: 457 Turnout: 2,803 (53.11%)

=== Bann Valley ===
1985: 2 x DUP, 2 x UUP, 1 x SDLP, 1 x Sinn Féin

Bann Valley - 6 seats
Party	Candidate	FPv%	Count				
Party	Candidate	FPv%	1	2	3	4	5
DUP	James Patterson*	16.96%	669				
DUP	Robert Wilson*	12.27%	484	564.1			
SDLP	Malachy McCamphill	13.94%	550	550.15	712.15		
Sinn Féin	Margaret Hogan	13.49%	532	532	557.15	622.15	
UUP	Kenneth Bamford*	12.34%	487	491.8	524.95	556.95	567.95
UUP	Joe Gaston*	12.72%	502	505.9	518.05	522.05	522.05
DUP	Robert Halliday*	11.99%	473	483.2	487.35	487.35	490.35
Alliance	Hugh McFarland*	6.29%	248	248.75			
Electorate: 5,997 Valid: 3,945 (65.78%) Spoilt: 57 Quota: 564 Turnout: 4,002 (66.73%)

=== Bushvale ===
1985: 2 x UUP, 2 x DUP, 1 x SDLP

Bushvale - 5 seats
Party	Candidate	FPv%	Count						
Party	Candidate	FPv%	1	2	3	4	5	6	7
DUP	Charles Steele*	19.18%	570						
DUP	William Gracey*	18.74%	557						
UUP	John Ramsay	16.96%	504						
SDLP	Harry Connolly*	14.97%	445	445.13	445.46	445.48	453.48	680.48	
UUP	William Logan*	14.57%	433	447.3	453.02	457.4	471.62	471.63	522.63
DUP	Bertie McIlhatton*	6.66%	198	255.46	306.39	306.77	311	311.13	318.13
SDLP	John Mulholland	7.74%	230	230.39	230.61	230.62	231.62		
Green (NI)	William Hartin	1.18%	35	35	35.77	35.78			
Electorate: 4,883 Valid: 2,972 (60.86%) Spoilt: 71 Quota: 496 Turnout: 3,043 (62.32%)
