= Ballymoney (District Electoral Area) =

District electoral area in Northern Ireland

- Causeway Coast and Glens Borough Council DEA constituency

Current constituency
- Created: 1985
- Seats: 5 (1985-2014); 7 (2014-)
- Councillors: Lee Kane (APNI); Jonathan McAuley (TUV); Ciarán McQuillan (SF); Leanne Peacock (SF); Mervyn Storey (DUP); Ivor Wallace (IND); Darryl Wilson (DUP)

Ballymoney DEA within Causeway Coast and Glens

Ballymoney Town DEA (1993-2014) within Ballymoney

Ballymoney is one of the seven district electoral areas (DEA) in Causeway Coast and Glens, Northern Ireland. The district elects seven members to Causeway Coast and Glens Borough Council and contains the wards of Ballymoney East, Ballymoney North, Ballymoney South, Clogh Mills, Dunloy, Rasharkin and Route. Ballymoney forms part of the North Antrim constituencies for the Northern Ireland Assembly and UK Parliament.

It was created for the 1985 local elections, replacing Ballymoney Area C which had existed since 1973. It was called Ballymoney Town until 2014, and contained five wards (Carnany, Fairhill, Glebe, Newhill and Route). For the 2014 local elections it gained most of the abolished Bann Valley DEA and parts of the abolished Bushvale DEA.

== Councillors ==
Election	Councillor (party)	Councillor (party)	Councillor (party)	Councillor (party)	Councillor (party)	Councillor (party)	Councillor (party)
January 2025 defection	Lee Kane (Alliance)	Darryl Wilson (UUP)/ (DUP)	Mervyn Storey (DUP)	Ivor Wallace (DUP)/ (Independent)	Jonathan McAuley (TUV)	Leanne Peacock (Sinn Féin)	Ciarán McQuillan (Sinn Féin)
May 2024 defection	Lee Kane (Alliance)	Darryl Wilson (UUP)/ (DUP)	Mervyn Storey (DUP)	Ivor Wallace (DUP)/ (Independent)	Jonathan McAuley (TUV)	Leanne Peacock (Sinn Féin)	Ciarán McQuillan (Sinn Féin)
2023	Lee Kane (Alliance)	Darryl Wilson (UUP)/ (DUP)	Mervyn Storey (DUP)	Ivor Wallace (DUP)/ (Independent)	Jonathan McAuley (TUV)	Leanne Peacock (Sinn Féin)	Ciarán McQuillan (Sinn Féin)
August 2022 co-options	Tom McKeown (UUP)	Darryl Wilson (UUP)/ (DUP)	Mervyn Storey (DUP)	Ivor Wallace (DUP)/ (Independent)	Alan McLean (DUP)	Leanne Peacock (Sinn Féin)	Ciarán McQuillan (Sinn Féin)
2019	Tom McKeown (UUP)	Darryl Wilson (UUP)/ (DUP)	John Finlay (DUP)	Ivor Wallace (DUP)/ (Independent)	Alan McLean (DUP)	Leanne Peacock (Sinn Féin)	Cathal McLaughlin (Sinn Féin)
September 2016 co-option	Tom McKeown (UUP)	Darryl Wilson (UUP)/ (DUP)	John Finlay (DUP)	Ian Stevenson (DUP)	Alan McLean (DUP)	William Blair (TUV)	Cathal McLaughlin (Sinn Féin)
2014	Tom McKeown (UUP)	Darryl Wilson (UUP)/ (DUP)	John Finlay (DUP)	Ian Stevenson (DUP)	Alan McLean (DUP)	William Blair (TUV)	Philip McGuigan (Sinn Féin)
2011	Tom McKeown (UUP)	Iain McAfee (Independent)	Mervyn Storey (DUP)	Ian Stevenson (DUP)	Cecil Cousley (DUP)	5 seats 1985–2014	5 seats 1985–2014
2005	Tom McKeown (UUP)	James Simpson (UUP)	Mervyn Storey (DUP)	Ian Stevenson (DUP)	Cecil Cousley (DUP)	5 seats 1985–2014	5 seats 1985–2014
2001	Tom McKeown (UUP)	James Simpson (UUP)	Mervyn Storey (DUP)	Ian Stevenson (DUP)	Cecil Cousley (DUP)	5 seats 1985–2014	5 seats 1985–2014
1997	Tom McKeown (UUP)	Bill Williamson (Independent)	Robert McComb (Independent)	Samuel McConaghie (DUP)	Cecil Cousley (DUP)	5 seats 1985–2014	5 seats 1985–2014
1993	Tom McKeown (UUP)	James Simpson (UUP)	Robert McComb (Independent)	Samuel McConaghie (DUP)	Cecil Cousley (DUP)	5 seats 1985–2014	5 seats 1985–2014
1989	James McKeown (UUP)	James Simpson (UUP)	Robert McComb (Independent)	Samuel McConaghie (DUP)	Cecil Cousley (DUP)	5 seats 1985–2014	5 seats 1985–2014
1985	Adam McNeilly (UUP)	James Simpson (UUP)	Robert McComb (Independent)	Kenneth Blair (DUP)	Cecil Cousley (DUP)	5 seats 1985–2014	5 seats 1985–2014

== 2023 election ==
2019: 3 x DUP, 2 x Sinn Féin, 2 x UUP

2023: 2 x DUP, 2 x Sinn Féin, 1 x UUP, 1 x TUV, 1 x Alliance

2019–2023 change: Alliance and TUV gain from DUP and UUP

Ballymoney - 7 seats
Party	Candidate	FPv%	Count						
Party	Candidate	FPv%	1	2	3	4	5	6	7
DUP	Mervyn Storey*	17.84%	1,779						
Sinn Féin	Ciarán McQuillan*	13.24%	1,320						
UUP	Darryl Wilson* ‡	12.59%	1,255						
Sinn Féin	Leanne Peacock*	11.97%	1,194	1,195.50	1,259.50				
DUP	Ivor Wallace* ‡	8.10%	808	1,123.60	1,126.60	1,248.60			
Alliance	Lee Kane	8.83%	880	881.50	903.80	1,233.20	1,300.30		
TUV	Jonathan McAuley	9.98%	995	1,025.30	1,030.30	1,134.40	1,134.70	1,139.20	1,139.20
DUP	Alan McLean*	8.64%	861	1,020.30	1,022.60	1,115.30	1,115.60	1,118.30	1,121.30
UUP	Tom McKeown*	4.39%	438	459.00	463.00				
SDLP	Caitlin Bond	2.87%	286	286.30	314.30				
Independent	Cathal McLaughlin	1.55%	155	155.60					
Electorate: 18,117 Valid: 9,971 (55.04%) Spoilt: 119 Quota: 1,247 Turnout: 10,090 (55.69%)

== 2019 election ==
2014: 3 x DUP, 2 x UUP, 1 x Sinn Féin, 1 x TUV

2019: 3 x DUP, 2 x UUP, 2 x Sinn Féin

2014-2019 change: Sinn Féin gain from TUV

Ballymoney - 7 seats
Party	Candidate	FPv%	Count						
Party	Candidate	FPv%	1	2	3	4	5	6	7
UUP	Darryl Wilson*	16.23%	1,420						
DUP	John Finlay* †	15.11%	1,322						
Sinn Féin	Leanne Peacock	13.18%	1,153						
UUP	Tom McKeown*	5.85%	512	702.67	716.1	735.27	802.23	802.38	1,143.38
DUP	Alan McLean*	9.45%	827	859.89	955.26	968.03	1,020.17	1,020.17	1,131.17
DUP	Ivor Wallace	9.44%	826	860.04	944.87	952.78	1,024.6	1,024.6	1,094
Sinn Féin	Cathal McLaughlin* †	10.35%	906	907.61	908.12	913.29	918.75	973.7	975.7
Alliance	Peter McCully	8.34%	734	744.81	745.49	762.95	798.04	799.59	827.49
TUV	William Blair*	5.68%	497	523.91	539.21	568.59	794.7	794.75	
Independent	Ian Stevenson*	2.51%	220	226.9	229.79	239.79			
TUV	John Wilson	2.48%	217	228.5	233.6	243.94			
UKIP	David Hanna	1.34%	117	121.83	125.57				
Electorate: 17,213 Valid: 8,751 (50.83%) Spoilt: 134 Quota: 1,094 Turnout: 8,885 (51.61%)

== 2014 election ==
2011: 3 x DUP, 1 x UUP, 1 x Independent

2014: 3 x DUP, 2 x UUP, 1 x Sinn Féin, 1 x TUV

2011-2014 change: UUP, Sinn Féin and TUV gain due to the addition of two seats

Ballymoney - 7 seats
Party	Candidate	FPv%	Count											
Party	Candidate	FPv%	1	2	3	4	5	6	7	8	9	10	11	12
DUP	John Finlay*	13.04%	1,075											
Sinn Féin	Philip McGuigan* †	11.41%	941	941	942	958	1,011	1,023	1,023	1,183				
TUV	William Blair*	10.26%	846	848.6	860.64	860.64	860.64	867.68	883.96	886.96	887.96	1,394.96		
DUP	Ian Stevenson*	7.19%	593	600.84	613.96	616.96	618.96	630.96	972.96	983	983	1,020.64	1,107.76	
UUP	Darryl Wilson*	9.14%	754	755.4	776.48	777.48	777.48	813.48	837.8	853.8	853.8	870.92	952.76	965.96
UUP	Tom McKeown*	7.53%	621	623.92	654.92	655.92	657.96	724	745.2	765.2	767.2	801.64	905.48	913.40
DUP	Alan McLean*	6.40%	528	540.32	552.36	555.36	556.36	572.36	685.44	690.44	691.44	733.04	821.92	869.44
Sinn Féin	Leanne Peacock	7.46%	615	615	615	621	653	662	662	767	859	860.04	860.04	860.04
TUV	Jamise McIlhagga	7.66%	632	634.12	635.12	636.12	637.12	644.12	664.28	666.28				
SDLP	Harry Boyle	4.05%	334	334.08	337.08	428.08	500.08	569.08	569.12					
DUP	Jonathan Wallace	6.43%	530	542.16	542.2	542.2	542.2	550.24						
Alliance	Stephen McFarland	3.69%	304	304.24	326.24	340.24	348.24							
Independent	Charley O'Kane	2.38%	196	196.04	199.04	207.04								
SDLP	Angela Mulholland	1.81%	149	149	150									
NI Conservatives	James Simpson	1.56%	129	129.36										
Electorate: 16,836 Valid: 8,247 (48.98%) Spoilt: 115 Quota: 1,031 Turnout: 8,362 (49.67%)

== 2011 election ==
2005: 3 x DUP, 2 x UUP

2011: 3 x DUP, 1 x UUP, 1 x Independent

2005-2011 change: Independent gain from UUP

Ballymoney Town - 5 seats
Party	Candidate	FPv%	Count					
Party	Candidate	FPv%	1	2	3	4	5	6
DUP	Mervyn Storey*	35.28%	1,090					
DUP	Ian Stevenson*	7.70%	238	547.42				
DUP	Cecil Cousley*	8.77%	271	360.1	370.7	382.46	558.64	
UUP	Tom McKeown*	8.93%	276	310.02	312.12	471.69	488.48	577.48
Independent	Iain McAfee	11.23%	347	366.98	368.58	384.73	397.3	448.47
SDLP	Daniel Hendrie	9.90%	306	313.02	313.22	316.22	317.81	323.91
TUV	Billy Kerr	7.38%	228	235.02	235.72	242.36	249.29	
DUP	Brian Kelly	4.79%	148	223.06	233.51	240.46		
UUP	James Simpson*	6.02%	186	213	215.2			
Electorate: 6,575 Valid: 3,090 (47.00%) Spoilt: 59 Quota: 516 Turnout: 3,149 (47.89%)

== 2005 election ==
2001: 3 x DUP, 2 x UUP

2005: 3 x DUP, 2 x UUP

2001-2005 change: No change

Ballymoney Town - 5 seats
Party	Candidate	FPv%	Count		
Party	Candidate	FPv%	1	2	3
DUP	Mervyn Storey*	25.36%	888		
DUP	Cecil Cousley*	23.54%	824		
DUP	Ian Stevenson*	18.91%	662		
UUP	Tom McKeown*	11.74%	411	600.2	
UUP	James Simpson*	7.43%	260	367.25	594.65
SDLP	Justin McCamphill	13.02%	456	459.85	470.65
Electorate: 6,551 Valid: 3,501 (53.44%) Spoilt: 77 Quota: 584 Turnout: 3,578 (54.62%)

== 2001 election ==
1997: 2 x Independent, 2 x DUP, 1 x UUP

2001: 3 x DUP, 2 x UUP

1997-2001 change: DUP and UUP gain from Independent (two seats)

Ballymoney Town - 5 seats
Party	Candidate	FPv%	Count					
Party	Candidate	FPv%	1	2	3	4	5	6
DUP	Cecil Cousley*	21.11%	788					
UUP	Tom McKeown*	10.61%	396	408.6	454.28	631.28		
DUP	Mervyn Storey	11.49%	429	485.49	493.12	497.33	661.33	
DUP	Ian Stevenson	11.60%	433	500.62	513.09	531.61	639.61	
UUP	James Simpson	9.40%	351	356.04	407.3	483.82	536.5	570.5
SDLP	Justin McCamphill	12.30%	459	459.84	485.05	497.05	507.05	509.05
Independent	Jim Wright	10.07%	376	379.57	420.2	424.83		
UUP	William Johnston	6.88%	257	263.51	306.98			
Independent	Jeffrey Balmer	3.35%	125	128.78				
Independent	Anne Logan	3.19%	119	123.41				
Electorate: 6,187 Valid: 3,733 (60.34%) Spoilt: 70 Quota: 623 Turnout: 3,803 (61.47%)

== 1997 election ==
1993: 2 x DUP, 2 x UUP, 1 x Independent

1997: 2 x Independent, 2 x DUP, 1 x UUP

1993-1997 change: Independent gain from UUP

Ballymoney Town - 5 seats
Party	Candidate	FPv%	Count				
Party	Candidate	FPv%	1	2	3	4	5
DUP	Cecil Cousley*	17.90%	493				
Independent	Robert McComb*	15.72%	433	435	469		
UUP	Tom McKeown*	12.09%	333	334	370	422	438
Independent	Bill Williamson	9.48%	261	265	274	340	413
DUP	Samuel McConaghie*	10.64%	293	293	326	344	346
UUP	James Simpson*	8.79%	242	242	263	326	336
SDLP	Joan McCaffrey	9.26%	255	269	272	294	
Independent	Colin McVicker	8.46%	233	239	260		
PUP	Jeffrey Balmer	6.54%	180	181			
NI Women's Coalition	Mary McCusker	1.13%	31				
Electorate: 5,905 Valid: 2,754 (46.64%) Spoilt: 53 Quota: 460 Turnout: 2,807 (47.54%)

== 1993 election ==
1989: 2 x DUP, 2 x UUP, 1 x Independent

1993: 2 x DUP, 2 x UUP, 1 x Independent

1989-1993 change: No change

Ballymoney Town - 5 seats
Party	Candidate	FPv%	Count					
Party	Candidate	FPv%	1	2	3	4	5	6
DUP	Cecil Cousley*	24.05%	636					
Independent	Robert McComb*	20.46%	541					
DUP	Samuel McConaghie*	12.59%	333	475.29				
UUP	Tom McKeown	10.17%	269	291.32	321.56	336.3	348.66	494.39
UUP	James Simpson*	11.20%	296	305.92	320.83	327.1	341.52	409.64
Independent	Colin McVicker	6.58%	174	180.2	199.1	202.4	309.49	342.53
UUP	Helen McKeown	8.09%	214	222.06	241.8	249.83	271.83	
Alliance	Hugh McFarland	6.85%	181	181.93	194.53	195.08		
Electorate: 5,804 Valid: 2,644 (45.55%) Spoilt: 56 Quota: 441 Turnout: 2,700 (46.52%)

== 1989 election ==
1985: 2 x DUP, 2 x UUP, 1 x Independent

1989: 2 x DUP, 2 x UUP, 1 x Independent

1985-1989 change: No change

Ballymoney Town - 5 seats
Party	Candidate	FPv%	Count
Party	Candidate	FPv%	1
DUP	Cecil Cousley*	N/A	N/A
UUP	James McKeown	N/A	N/A
Independent	Robert McComb*	N/A	N/A
DUP	Sam McConaghie	N/A	N/A
UUP	James Simpson*	N/A	N/A
Electorate: N/A Valid: N/A Spoilt: N/A Quota: N/A Turnout: N/A

- As only five candidates had been nominated for five seats, there was no vote in Ballymoney Town and all five candidates were deemed elected.

== 1985 election ==
1985: 2 x DUP, 2 x UUP, 1 x Independent

Ballymoney Town - 5 seats
Party	Candidate	FPv%	Count				
Party	Candidate	FPv%	1	2	3	4	5
Independent	Robert McComb*	25.07%	687				
UUP	James Simpson	16.53%	453	502.45			
DUP	Cecil Cousley*	15.47%	424	457.97			
DUP	Kenneth Blair	13.87%	380	395.91	396.77	613.77	
UUP	Adam McNeilly	10.00%	274	326.03	347.53	381.12	430.12
UUP	James McKeown	8.50%	233	293.63	311.69	345.99	412.99
DUP	Ralph Stronge*	10.55%	289	304.05	307.06		
Electorate: 5,278 Valid: 2,740 (51.91%) Spoilt: 63 Quota: 457 Turnout: 2,803 (53.11%)
