= Daithí McKay =

Irish politician (born 1982)

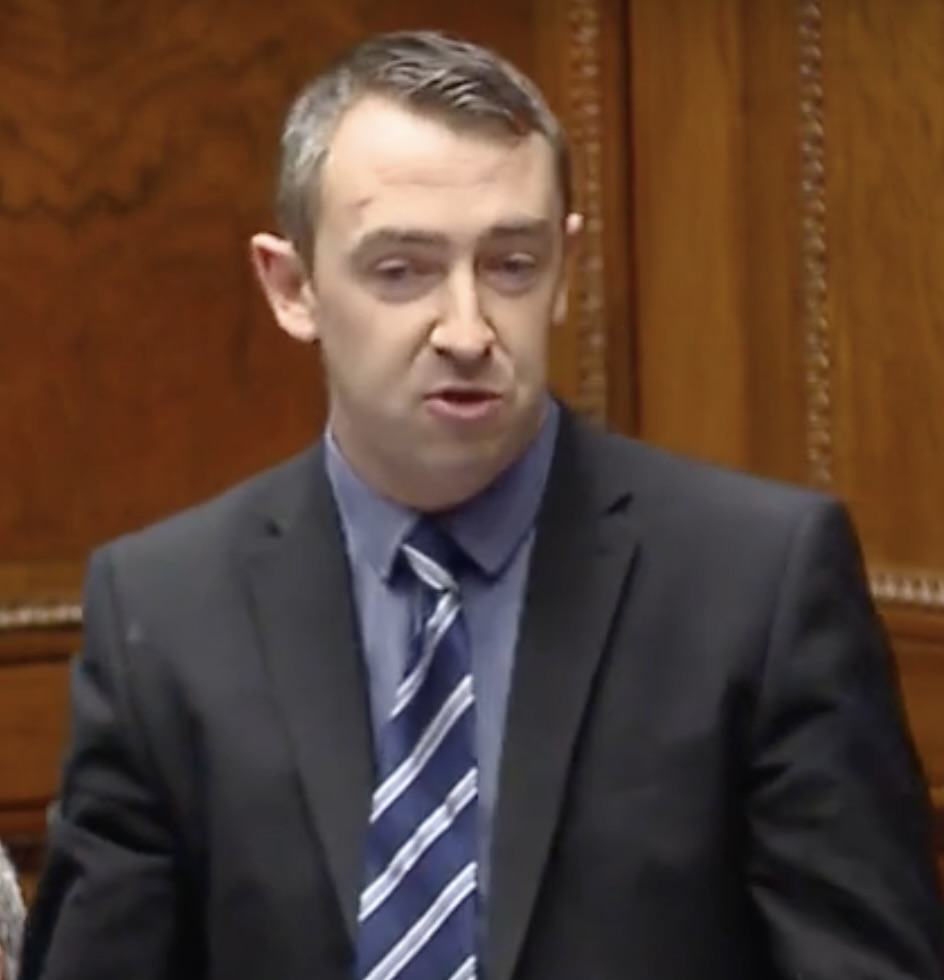
- McKay in 2015

Chairperson of Finance and Personnel Committee
- In office 2012–2016
- Preceded by: Conor Murphy
- Succeeded by: Emma Pengelly

Member of the Northern Ireland Policing Board
- In office 2007–2011

Member of the Northern Ireland Assembly for North Antrim
- In office 7 March 2007 – 18 August 2016
- Preceded by: Philip McGuigan
- Succeeded by: Philip McGuigan

Member of Ballymoney Borough Council
- In office 5 May 2005 – 2010
- Preceded by: Joe Gaston
- Succeeded by: Cathal McLaughlin
- Constituency: Bann Valley

Personal details
- Born: 2 March 1982 (age 44) Ballymena, County Antrim, Northern Ireland
- Party: Sinn Féin
- Education: St Louis' Grammar School, Ballymena
- Website: Daithí McKay

Daithí Gerard McKay (born 1982, Ballymena, County Antrim, Northern Ireland) is an Irish newspaper columnist and former Sinn Féin politician. He was the Chair of the Finance Committee in the Northern Ireland Assembly from 2012 to 2016, and a Member of the Northern Ireland Assembly (MLA) for North Antrim from 2007 to 2016. He brought forward legislation that led to the introduction of a Carrier Bag Levy in Northern Ireland and the abolishment of rates for Community Amateur Sport Clubs.

In 2016, he began serving as a political columnist and commentator. He is the current Chairperson of the Climate Coalition NI and was involved in the development of Northern Ireland's first Climate Change Act in 2022.

== Background ==
McKay was born in Ballymena in 1982 and raised in Rasharkin, County Antrim.

Prior to being elected he was involved in aid work in the Palestinian West Bank where he worked with the International Solidarity Movement.

== Elected office ==
He was elected to Ballymoney Council in 2005 becoming the youngest ever member of Ballymoney Borough Council.

In 2007, McKay contested the North Antrim seat in the Northern Ireland legislature. He went on to claim his seat after the first count, coming second behind Ian Paisley of the Democratic Unionist Party (DUP).

McKay was the youngest Member elected to the 2007 Assembly and he became one of the first Sinn Féin members to sit on the Policing Board along with Martina Anderson and Alex Maskey.

In September 2007 McKay used parliamentary privilege to name private developer Seymour Sweeney as a member of the DUP. The DUP Environment Minister, Arlene Foster, had said that she was 'minded' to approve an application from Sweeney for a private visitor centre at the Giant's Causeway, even though her Planning Service officials had recommended that it be refused.

Foster threatened to take McKay to court over the matter but in January 2008 she decided to refuse the private application.

== Carrier Bag Levy ==
In 2011 McKay introduced the "Single Use Plastic Bag Bill" which was passed by the Assembly as the "Single Use Carrier Bag Act 2011". He had raised the matter through a Private Members Debate previously and is believed to be responsible for Sinn Féin ensuring that the levy was included in the Executive's Budget in 2010. The Act amended part of the Climate Change Act 2008.

The 5-pence levy was introduced in 2013 and his bill also ensured that the proceeds went towards environmental and community projects.

It has resulted in the reduction in usage of carrier bags in Northern Ireland by millions annually.

== The SpAd Bill ==
In 2013 McKay opposed the Special Advisers Bill brought forward by TUV leader Jim Allister. The Bill aimed to dis-bar ex-prisoners from being Special Advisors to Ministers in the Executive. During the closing debate in which Allister's Bill was ultimately passed McKay made a "marathon 2-hour speech" in opposition. This remains the longest speech ever made by an MLA in the Assembly.

== Campaign to abolish rates for Sport Clubs ==
In 2013 McKay started a campaign to abolish rates for sport clubs. In his legislation he proposed that CASCs (Community Amateur Sport Clubs) should have 100% rate relief on their grounds and facilities. He secured the support of the majority of MLAs but the DUP blocked the bill using the Petition of Concern.

The campaign still proved successful with the Department of Finance committing to grant 100% rate relief for clubs as long as they did not have licensed bars. A proposal put by McKay to the Assembly was passed that ensured that the Department had to have regulations in place by the end of September 2016.

On 26 October 2016 full relief for CASCs without bars was introduced by the Finance Minister.

== Resignation ==
On 13 July 2016 McKay called on the Parades Commission to bar Dervock Young Defenders band from partaking in parades in sensitive areas following an incident in Ballycastle.

After McKay made a presentation to the commission with members of the Rasharkin Residents Association the band were barred from participating in the Ballymaconnelly parade.

It was alleged that after this parade decision was made the loyalist blogger Jamie Bryson leaked details of messages he exchanged with McKay in which McKay allegedly refers Bryson to a third party whilst he chaired the NAMA Enquiry in the Assembly.

The First Minister Peter Robinson resigned less than 2 months after Bryson made allegations at the Finance Committee and McKay was accused of helping to 'take out' the First Minister that was in office with his party colleague Martin McGuinness at the time.

McKay resigned as an MLA on 18 August 2016.

He was subsequently acquited of all charges in a high profile trial in 2025. Following the case his solicitor Michael Madden stated that

“The context of this case is important. The public were concerned about allegations concerning the operation of a ‘golden circle’ in Belfast and wanted MLAs to act decisively. The outcome of this case has shown that Mr McKay acted in the public interest at all times and was involved in a battle with a number of parties that wanted to undermine and crash the NAMA Inquiry."

== Columnist and writer ==
McKay began writing for the Belfast Telegraph in December 2016. He also began working as a commentator on BBC and ITV.

In his first article he called on mainly nationalist councils to introduce the flying of the tricolour from government buildings in the north for the first time by adopting a flags policy of equality rather than neutrality.

McKay believes that the mandatory coalition system that puts parties in power automatically is flawed. He has called for Assembly reform. A suggestion he has put forward for discussion is that a hybrid model of a weighted majority system retaining some cross-community safeguards would help address political 'gridlock'.

In 2022 he said that the Secretary of State had a responsibility to outline publicly how an Irish unity referendum "might be triggered" given rising levels of support for a border poll.

In 2023 he set up 'Strabane Greenways' to lobby for a new greenway between Strabane and Sion Mills in County Tyrone.

He currently has a weekly column in the Belfast Telegraph.

Northern Ireland Assembly
Preceded by Philip McGuigan	MLA for North Antrim; 2007–2016	Succeeded by Philip McGuigan
