= North Antrim =

North Antrim may refer to:

- The northern part of County Antrim
- North Antrim (Assembly constituency)
- North Antrim (Northern Ireland Parliament constituency)
- North Antrim (UK Parliament constituency)
