= Philip McGuigan =

Northern Irish politician (born 1973)

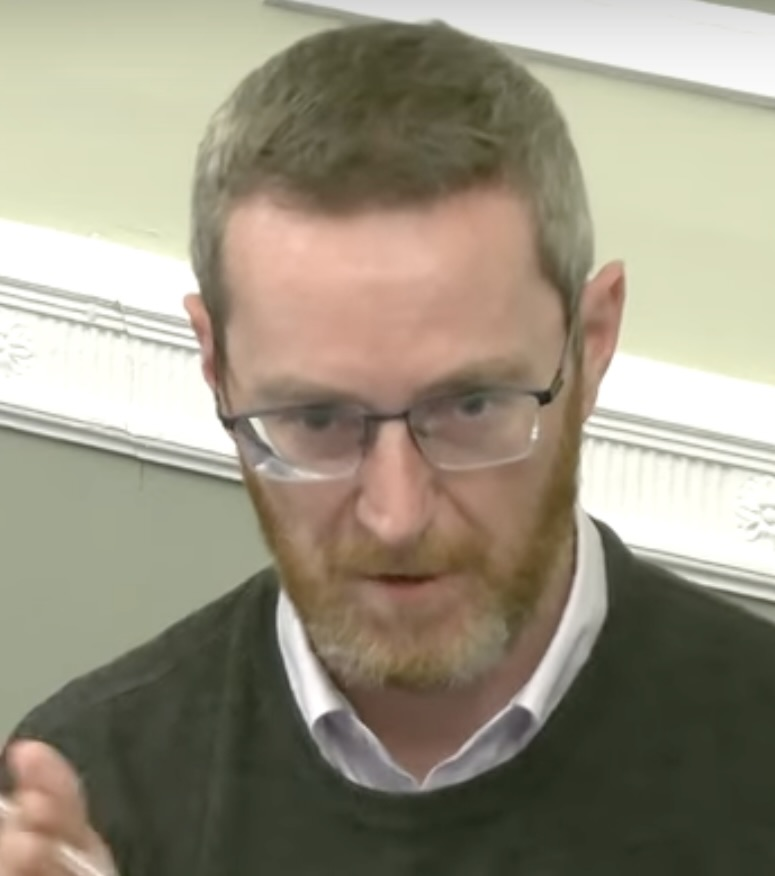
- McGuigan in 2024

Member of the Northern Ireland Assembly for Antrim North
- Incumbent
- Assumed office 30 August 2016
- Preceded by: Daithí McKay
- In office 26 November 2003 – 7 March 2007
- Preceded by: Gardiner Kane
- Succeeded by: Daithí McKay

Member of Causeway Coast and Glens Borough Council
- In office 22 May 2014 – 30 August 2016
- Preceded by: Council created
- Succeeded by: Cathal McLaughlin
- Constituency: Ballymoney

Member of Ballymena Borough Council
- In office 7 June 2001 – 22 May 2014
- Preceded by: Martin O'Neill
- Succeeded by: Council abolished
- Constituency: Bann Valley

Personal details
- Born: 1973 (age 52–53) Swatragh, Northern Ireland
- Party: Sinn Féin

Philip McGuigan (born 1973) is an Irish Sinn Féin politician who has been a Member of the Northern Ireland Assembly (MLA) for North Antrim since 2016, having served from 2003 to 2007. He was a Ballymoney Borough Councillor for the Bann Valley DEA from 2001 to 2014.

== Career ==
McGuigan was first elected to Ballymoney Borough Council in the 2001 local elections, representing the Bann Valley District.

He was elected to the Northern Ireland Assembly at the 2003 election, becoming Sinn Féin's first MLA in North Antrim.

He was an unsuccessful candidate in North Antrim at the 2005 general election, though was re-elected as a councillor in the local elections that same year.

McGuigan stood down as an MLA at the 2007 Assembly election, succeeded by fellow Ballymoney Councillor, Daithí McKay.

He was re-elected at the 2011 local elections, and was later elected to the newly-formed Causeway Coast and Glens Borough Council, representing the Ballymoney DEA, in 2014.

He was co-opted to the Assembly in 2016, replacing McKay following the latter's resignation. In the 2017 Assembly election, McGuigan became the first Sinn Féin candidate to top the poll in the North Antrim constituency.

== Personal life ==
McGuigan was raised in Swatragh, County Londonderry. He and his wife Paula have four children, Rachael, Stephen, Cathair and Daithi. They live in Dunloy.

Northern Ireland Assembly
Preceded by Gardiner Kane	MLA for Antrim North; 2003–2007	Succeeded by Daithí McKay
Preceded by Daithí McKay	MLA for North Antrim; 2016–present	Incumbent
