= Cecil Cousley =

Northern Irish politician (1932–2020)

Mayor of Ballymoney
- In office 2004–2005
- Preceded by: Frank Campbell
- Succeeded by: John Finlay
- In office 1994–1995
- Preceded by: Joe Gaston
- Succeeded by: Joe Gaston
- In office 1988–1989
- Preceded by: Joe Gaston
- Succeeded by: Joe Gaston

Member of Ballymoney Borough Council
- In office 15 May 1985 – 22 May 2014
- Preceded by: District created
- Succeeded by: Council abolished
- Constituency: Ballymoney Town
- In office 20 May 1981 – 15 May 1985
- Preceded by: Brendan Smyth
- Succeeded by: District abolished
- Constituency: Ballymoney Area C

Member of the Northern Ireland Assembly for North Antrim
- In office 20 October 1982 – 1986

Personal details
- Born: February 1932 Ballymoney, Northern Ireland
- Died: 12 October 2020 (aged 88)
- Party: Democratic Unionist

Cecil Cousley MBE (February 1932 – 12 October 2020) was a Northern Irish unionist politician who served as Mayor of Ballymoney on three separate occasions, and was a Ballymoney Councillor from 1981 to 2014.

A member of the Democratic Unionist Party (DUP), Cousley was a Member of the Northern Ireland Assembly (MLA) for North Antrim from 1982 until 1986.

== Background ==
Cousley was a farmer living near Ballymoney, and an elder at Drumreagh Presbyterian Church.

Cousley was elected to Ballymoney Borough Council in 1981 for the Democratic Unionist Party (DUP). He was also elected to the Northern Ireland Assembly, 1982 in North Antrim. He held his council seat at each election until he retired in 2015, regularly placing top in the poll. He served as Mayor of Ballymoney in 1988 – 89, 94 – 95 and 2004 – 05, and as Deputy Mayor in 1991 – 92, 2002–03 and 2006 – 07.

In 2007, several sheep were killed on his land, leading to speculation that the Beast of Ballybogey, a phantom cat, was active; the Police Service of Northern Ireland discounted this theory.

Northern Ireland Assembly (1982)
New assembly	MPA for North Antrim; 1982–1986	Assembly abolished
Civic offices
Preceded by Joe Gaston	Mayor of Ballymoney; 1988–89	Succeeded by Joe Gaston
Preceded by Joe Gaston	Mayor of Ballymoney; 1994–95	Succeeded by Joe Gaston
Preceded by Frank Campbell	Mayor of Ballymoney; 2004–05	Succeeded by John Finlay
