= Joe Gaston (politician) =

British politician (born 1926)

Member of Ballymoney Borough Council
- In office 15 May 1985 – 5 May 2005
- Preceded by: District created
- Succeeded by: Daithí McKay
- Constituency: Bann Valley
- In office 30 May 1973 – 15 May 1985
- Preceded by: District created
- Succeeded by: District abolished
- Constituency: Ballymoney Area B

Member of the Northern Ireland Forum for North Antrim
- In office 30 May 1996 – 25 April 1998

Member of the Northern Ireland Assembly for North Antrim
- In office 1982–1986

Personal details
- Born: 1926/ 1927
- Died: 15 March 2018
- Party: Ulster Unionist Party (from 1977)
- Other political affiliations: Independent Unionist (1973 - 1977)

Joe Gaston (1926 or 1927 – 15 March 2018) was a Northern Irish unionist politician.

== Background ==
Gaston worked as a farmer and served part-time in the Ulster Defence Regiment. In 1973, he was elected to Ballymoney Borough Council as a non-party candidate. He was re-elected in 1977, for the Ulster Unionist Party (UUP).

In December 1977, Gaston's right leg was removed by a bomb planted in his tractor by the Provisional Irish Republican Army.

Gaston was elected at the 1982 Northern Ireland Assembly election in North Antrim. In 1985, he served as deputy mayor of Ballymoney, then as mayor from 1986 to 1987 and from 1990 to 1993.

At the 1992 general election, Gaston contested Ian Paisley's North Antrim seat, taking second place with 18.1% of the votes cast. In 1996, he was elected to the Northern Ireland Forum, again in North Antrim, and served his final term as Mayor of Ballymoney.

Gaston lost his council seat to Sinn Féin's Daithi McKay in 2005.

Northern Ireland Assembly (1982)
| New assembly | MPA for North Antrim; 1982–1986 | Assembly abolished |
Northern Ireland Forum
| New forum | Member for North Antrim; 1996–1998 | Forum dissolved |
Civic offices
| Preceded by Charles Steele | Mayor of Ballymoney; 1986–87 | Succeeded by Cecil Cousley |
| Preceded by Cecil Cousley | Mayor of Ballymoney; 1990–93 | Succeeded by Cecil Cousley |
| Preceded by Cecil Cousley | Mayor of Ballymoney; 1996 | Succeeded by Frank Campbell |
