= Ballymoney Borough Council =

Former local authority in Northern Ireland

Type
- Type: District Council of Ballymoney (borough)

History
- Founded: 1973 (as Ballymoney District Council)
- Disbanded: 2015
- Succeeded by: Causeway Coast and Glens District Council
- Seats: 16

Meeting place
- Riada House, Charles Street, Ballymoney

Map of the borough's DEAs from 1993 to 2014

Ballymoney Borough Council was the local authority of Ballymoney in Northern Ireland. Originally formed in the 1970s, the council ceased to operate as a separate entity in 2015 when it was combined with other local authorities to form the Causeway Coast and Glens District Council.

== History ==
The borders of the Ballymoney local authority area were established in 1973, following the enactment of the Local Government (Boundaries) Act (Northern Ireland) 1971. Originally known as Ballymoney District Council, the local authority became Ballymoney Borough Council following the grant of a charter of incorporation in 1977. In May 2015, the council ceased to operate as a separate entity when, under a reorganisation of local government in Northern Ireland, it was merged with Coleraine Borough Council, Limavady Borough Council and Moyle District Council, to become Causeway Coast and Glens District Council.

== Population ==
The area covered by Ballymoney Borough Council had a population of 31,224 residents according to the 2011 Northern Ireland census.

== See also ==
- 1973 Ballymoney District Council election
- 1977 Ballymoney Borough Council election
