= Coagh =

Village in counties Londonderry and Tyrone, Northern Ireland

Coordinates: 54.6477°N 6.6184°W

Coagh: Irish: An Cuach
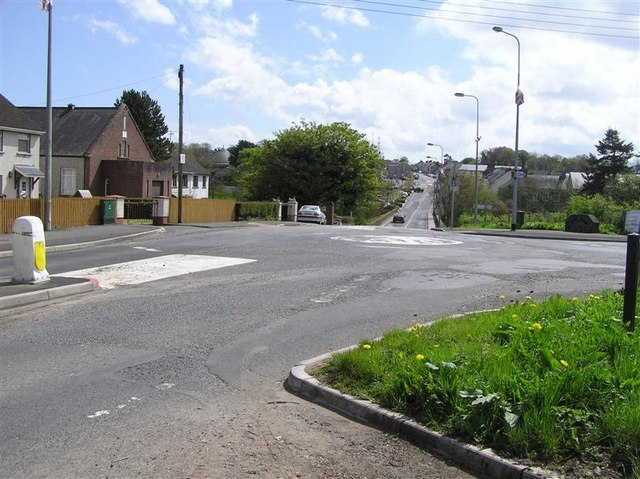
- Looking towards the village, from the County Londonderry side

- Location within Northern Ireland
- Population: 774 (2021 census)
- Irish grid reference: H8978
  - Belfast: 45 miles
- District: Mid Ulster
- County: County Tyrone County Londonderry
- Country: Northern Ireland
- Sovereign state: United Kingdom
- Post town: COOKSTOWN
- Postcode district: BT80
- Post town: MAGHERAFELT
- Postcode district: BT45
- Dialling code: 028
- UK Parliament: Mid Ulster
- NI Assembly: Mid Ulster

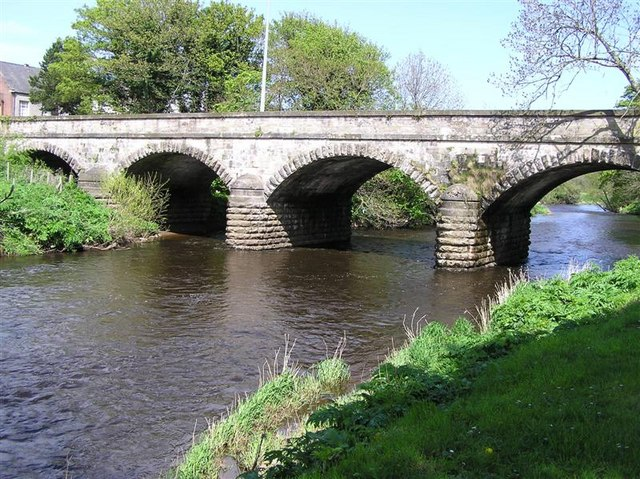
The bridge in Coagh which crosses the Ballinderry river; on the left is County Londonderry; on the right is County Tyrone

Coagh (/koʊk/ KOHK; from Irish An Cuach, meaning 'the hollow') is a village in County Tyrone, Northern Ireland, five miles (8 km) east of Cookstown. Part of the village also extends into County Londonderry. It had a population of 774 people in the 2021 census. It owes its existence to George Butle Conyngham of Springhill, and was founded in 1728 when King George II of Great Britain granted Conyngham a market charter allowing the village to host four fairs yearly. It is situated within Mid-Ulster District. The village is situated on gentle, low-lying land between the Sperrins and Lough Neagh.

== History ==
The village has been an ancient settlement for several thousand years; overlooking Coagh is Tamlaght Stone, a Mesolithic dolmen erected c. 4500 BCE.

The main feature of the village is Hanover Square, which was named after the reigning Hanoverian George II by Conyngham.

The Coagh ambush, which took place during The Troubles, resulted in the deaths of three members of the Provisional Irish Republican Army (IRA). On 3 June 1991, IRA volunteers Lawrence McNally, Peter Ryan and Tony Doris were killed in the area by an SAS unit. The British Army stated that the IRA members had been intercepted on their way to an attack. Over 200 rounds were fired at the car carrying the three men.

== Amenities ==
Coagh has a doctor's surgery which serves local areas, such as Ardboe, Ballinderry, Moortown, Drummullan, The Loup and Moneymore.

The local primary school, Coagh Primary School, is a feeder school for a number of local secondary schools, including Cookstown High School.

== Sport ==
The local association football club, Coagh United, plays in the NIFL Premier Intermediate League.

== Demographics ==
=== 19th century ===
The population of the village increased slightly overall during the 19th century:

Year	1841	1851	1861	1871	1881	1891
Population	388	385	403	526	400	394
Houses	90	82	86	115	93	96

=== 21st century ===
Coagh is classified as a small village or hamlet by the Northern Ireland Statistics and Research Agency (NISRA) (i.e. with population between 500 and 1,000 people). On census day in 2001, 29 April 2001, there were 545 people living in Coagh. Of these:

- 20.9% were aged under 16 and 20.4% were aged 60 and over
- 48.3% of the population were male and 51.7% were female
- 26.4% were from a Catholic background and 72.8% were from a Protestant background
- 2.3% of people aged 16–74 were unemployed.

== Coagh townland ==
The townland of Coagh is situated in the historic barony of Dungannon Upper and the civil parish of Tamlaght and covers an area of 616 acres.

The population of the townland declined during the 19th century:

Year	1841	1851	1861	1871	1881	1891
Population	207	160	136	160	115	100
Houses	37	32	29	32	28	22

In 1891, the town of Coagh, standing in the townlands of Coagh and Urbal, covered an estimated area of 13 acres.

== Politics ==
Mid Ulster constituency, in which Coagh lies, used for Parliamentary and Assembly elections.

Since 1950, Coagh has formed part of the Mid Ulster constituency for Parliamentary elections, with this constituency also being used for elections to the Assembly and other devolved bodies from 1973 onwards. In Parliament, Mid Ulster has been represented by the abstentionist Sinn Féin since 1997, and in devolved elections Sinn Féin has been the largest party in the constituency since the 1996 election to the talks forum.

In local government, Coagh has been part of Mid Ulster District Council since it succeeded Cookstown District Council in 2015. Coagh sits within the ward of the same name in Cookstown DEA. Councillors for this DEA were first elected in 2014 and sat as part of a shadow council until Mid Ulster District Council formally took over in 2015.

Mid Ulster District Council, in which Coagh lies.

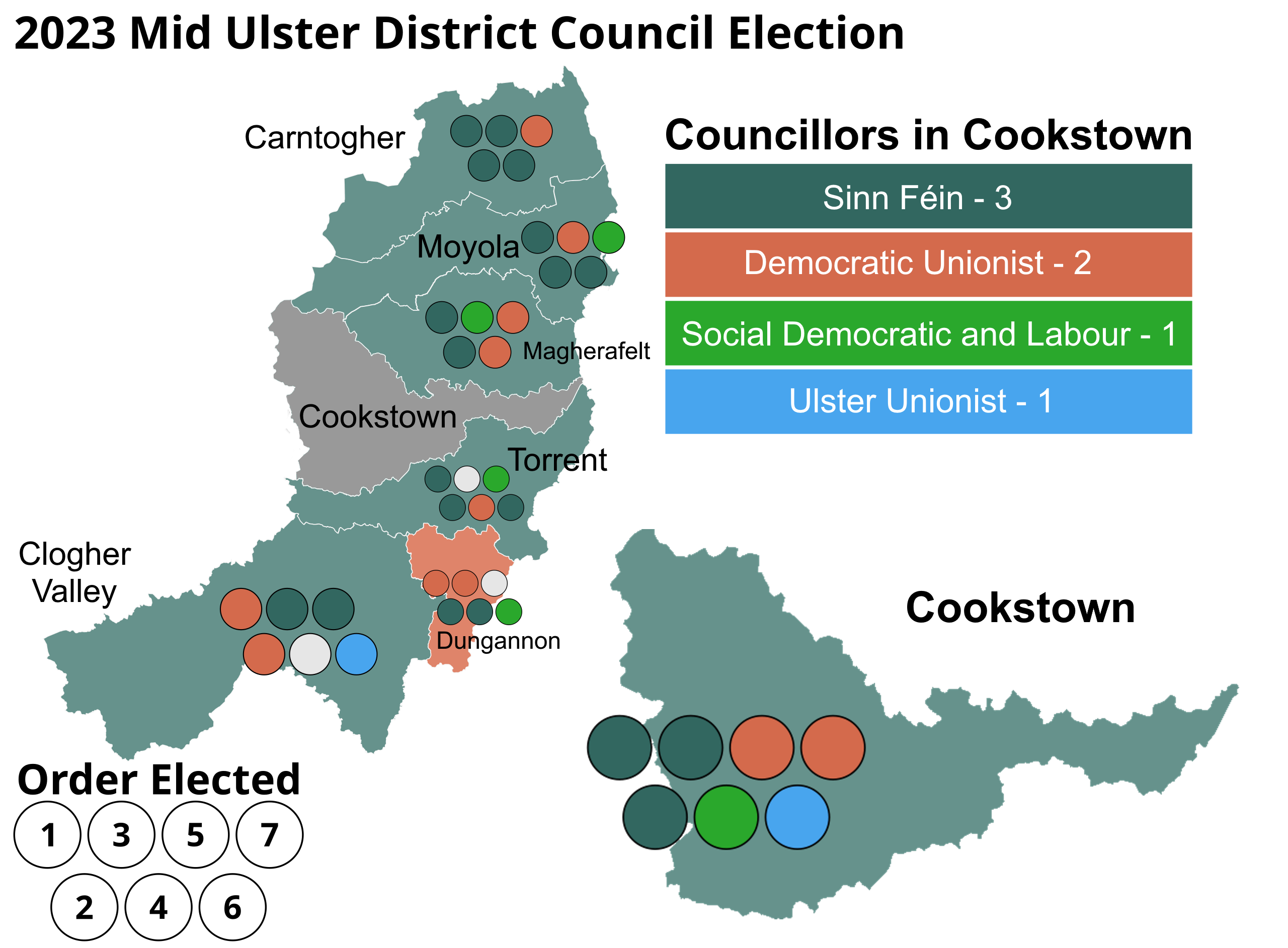

While a part of Cookstown District Council, Coagh previously sat within the ward of the same name in Ballinderry DEA from 1981 onwards (with Ballinderry DEA having succeeded the earlier Cookstown Area B which existed from 1973 to 1981).

In both of these DEAs, Sinn Féin has been the largest party since 2011, and were joint-largest in 2005, when Ballinderry DEA was uncontested due to the number of candidates being same as the number of available seats, and no election was held. On this occasion, Sinn Féin and the SDLP won two seats each, out of the six available.

Since 1973, Coagh has been represented by the following councillors:

Election	Councillor (Party)	Councillor (Party)	Councillor (Party)	Councillor (Party)	Councillor (Party)	Councillor (Party)	Councillor (Party)
Cookstown DEA (2014-present)
2023	John McNamee (Sinn Féin)	Cathal Mallaghan (Sinn Féin)	Gavin Bell (Sinn Féin)	Kerri Martin (SDLP)	Trevor Wilson (UUP)	Wilbert Buchanan (DUP)	Eva Cahoon (DUP)
2019	John McNamee (Sinn Féin)	Cathal Mallaghan (Sinn Féin)	Gavin Bell (Sinn Féin)	Kerri Martin (SDLP)	Trevor Wilson (UUP)	Wilbert Buchanan (DUP)	Mark Glasgow (UUP)
May 2017 defection	John McNamee (Sinn Féin)	Cathal Mallaghan (Sinn Féin)	Gavin Bell (Sinn Féin)	Tony Quinn (SDLP/Ind)	Trevor Wilson (UUP)	Wilbert Buchanan (DUP)	Mark Glasgow (UUP)
2014	John McNamee (Sinn Féin)	Cathal Mallaghan (Sinn Féin)	Gavin Bell (Sinn Féin)	Tony Quinn (SDLP/Ind)	Trevor Wilson (UUP)	Wilbert Buchanan (DUP)	Mark Glasgow (UUP)
Ballinderry DEA (1981-2014)							6 seats (1973-2014)
2011	Patrick McAleer (Sinn Féin)	Michael McIvor (Sinn Féin)	Deirdre Mayo (SDLP)	Christine McFlynn (SDLP)	Robert Kelly (UUP)	Samuel McCartney (DUP)	6 seats (1973-2014)
2005	Patrick McAleer (Sinn Féin)	Michael McIvor (Sinn Féin)	Patsy McGlone (SDLP)	Mary Baker (SDLP)	Thomas Greer (UUP)	Samuel McCartney (DUP)	6 seats (1973-2014)
2001	Patrick McAleer (Sinn Féin)	Michael McIvor (Sinn Féin)	Patsy McGlone (SDLP)	Mary Baker (SDLP)	Thomas Greer (UUP)	Anne McCrea (DUP)	6 seats (1973-2014)
1997	Patrick McAleer (Sinn Féin)	Seamus Campbell (Sinn Féin)	Patsy McGlone (SDLP)	Mary Baker (SDLP)	Thomas Greer (UUP)	Anne McCrea (DUP)	6 seats (1973-2014)
1993	Victor McGahie (UUP)	Seamus Campbell (Sinn Féin)	Patsy McGlone (SDLP)	Francis Rock (SDLP)	Thomas Greer (UUP)	Anne McCrea (DUP)	6 seats (1973-2014)
1989	Victor McGahie (UUP)	Francis McNally (Sinn Féin)	John O'Neill (SDLP)	Paddy Duffy (SDLP)	William McIntyre (DUP)	Samuel McCartney (DUP)	6 seats (1973-2014)
1985	Victor McGahie (UUP)	Francis McNally (Sinn Féin)	Patrick McAleer (Sinn Féin)	Paddy Duffy (SDLP)	William McIntyre (DUP)	Samuel McCartney (DUP)	6 seats (1973-2014)
Cookstown Area B (1973-1981)							6 seats (1973-2014)
1981	Paddy Duffy (SDLP)	Joseph Davidson (SDLP)	Michael McIvor (Ind Republican)	William McIntyre (DUP)/(UUUP)/(UUP)	Victor McGahie (UUP)/(UUUP)	James Howard (UUP)	6 seats (1973-2014)
1977	Paddy Duffy (SDLP)	Joseph Davidson (SDLP)	Michael McIvor (Ind Republican)	William McIntyre (DUP)/(UUUP)/(UUP)	Victor McGahie (UUP)/(UUUP)	James Howard (UUP)	6 seats (1973-2014)
1973	Paddy Duffy (SDLP)	Joseph Davidson (SDLP)	J. J. O'Kane (Ind Nationalist)	William McIntyre (DUP)/(UUUP)/(UUP)	Victor McGahie (UUP)/(UUUP)	James Howard (UUP)	6 seats (1973-2014)

== Notable people ==
- Jimmy Kennedy, Tin Pan Alley composer, grew up here.
- Stuart Dallas (born 1991), Northern Ireland international footballer, grew up in Coagh, having been born in Cookstown.

== See also ==
- List of villages in Northern Ireland
- List of towns in Northern Ireland
- List of townlands of County Tyrone
