= Ardboe =

Parish in County Tyrone, Northern Ireland

Coordinates: 54.623°N 6.514°W

Ardboe: Irish: Ard Bó
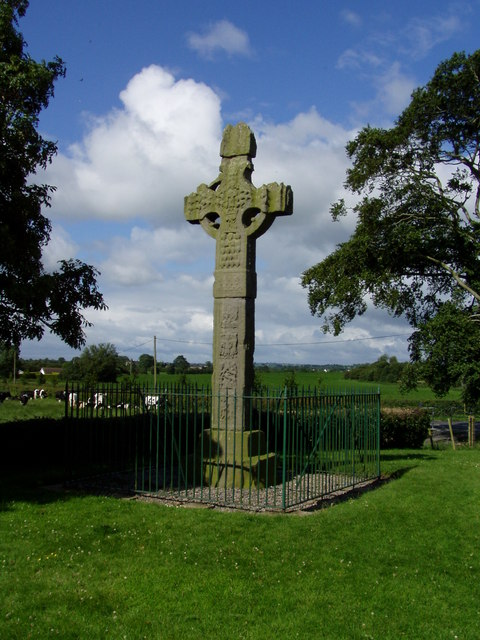
- Ardboe High Cross

- Location within Northern Ireland
- Population: 2,221 (2001 Census)
  - Belfast: 23 mi (37 km)
  - Dublin: 88 mi (142 km)
- District: Mid Ulster
- County: County Tyrone
- Country: Northern Ireland
- Sovereign state: United Kingdom
- Post town: DUNGANNON
- Postcode district: BT71
- Dialling code: 028
- UK Parliament: Mid Ulster
- NI Assembly: Mid Ulster

Ardboe (from Irish Ard Bó 'height of the cows') is a large civil parish in east County Tyrone, Northern Ireland. It borders the western shore of Lough Neagh and lies within the Mid Ulster District Council area. It is also the name of the local civil parish, which incorporates both Mullinahoe and Moortown.

Ardboe Development Association, which developed a small business park, and Ardboe Community Group are based in the Mullinahoe part of the parish.

The name "Ard Boe" means "high cow" comes from a legend that the monastery of Ardboe was built from the milk of a magic cow which emerged from nearby Lough Neagh.

== History ==
During the Second World War, in 1941, an RAF station was built in the townland of Kinrush in Ardboe. RAF Cluntoe was initially used by the Royal Air Force, but quickly handed over as a training station for the United States Army Air Forces, and by 1943, over 3,500 troops were stationed there. By 1946 the war was over and the Americans had left. The RAF kept the airfield ticking over and it was reopened in 1952 as a training station for pilots going to the Korean War. By 1955 it closed for good. Remains of the Cluntoe Airfield around Ardboe can still be seen, with the area known as "The Drum" among locals.

=== The Troubles ===
The parish of Ardboe experienced multiple fatal incidents during the Troubles.

== Places of interest ==
- One of several examples of the Irish high cross in Ulster is located in the parish of Ardboe on a small hillock close to Lough Neagh. Ardboe High Cross, which dates to the 9th/10th century, is all that now remains of a 6th-century monastery, which was established by Saint Colman of Ardboe. The cross, made of sandstone, stands about eighteen feet high. Although well-weathered with some structural damage, Ardboe High Cross retains examples of figurative carving, incorporating 22 panels of sculpture of biblical events.
- The Battery Harbour, in the townland of Ardean, with public access to Lough Neagh, is the base for Lough Neagh Rescue. and fishing boats and visiting yachts and [pleasure boats.
- Coyle's Cottage located at "Keerie's Corner" which is a T-junction in Anneeterbeg is a 300-year-old restored fisherman's cottage. It is the home of the Muintirevlin Historical Society and Gort Moss Walking Club and hosts music nights and traditional music classes. The Kinturk Cultural Centre, located in Anneeterbeg, has visitor information, dining and bar facilities.

== Townlands ==
Arboe civil parish contains the following townlands (four of which are in County Londonderry):

- Aghacolumb
- Annaghmore
- Annahavil
- Anneetermore
- Anneeterbeg
- Ardean
- Ballygonny More
- Ballymaguire
- Ballymurphy
- Ballynafeagh
- Ballynargan
- Brookend
- Carnan
- Cluntoe (Quin)
- Cluntoe (Richardson)
- Dromore
- Drumard
- Drumenny (Conyngham)
- Drumenny (Stewart)
- Drumhubbert
- Drummullan
- Eary Lower
- Elagh
- Farsnagh
- Feagh
- Gortigal
- Gortnagwyg
- Killycanavan Lower
- Killycolpy
- Killygonlan
- Killymenagh
- Killywoolaghan
- Kilmascally
- Kinrush
- Kinturk
- Lurgyroe
- Moneyhaw
- Mullaghglass
- Mullaghwotragh
- Mullinahoe
- Sessia (in Coagh division)
- Sessia (in Mullanahoe division)
- Stuart Hall
- Tamlaghtmore
- Tamnavally
- Trickvallen

== Sport ==
St Malachy's GAC and Ardboe O'Donovan Rossa GAC are the local Gaelic Athletic Association clubs. The two have a history of a rivalry, with both teams sharing victories. Many previous Gaelic football clubs existed including St John's Mullan and Kinturk.

== Demographics ==
Ardboe, while a large parish, is classified as a 'small village' by the Northern Ireland Statistics and Research Agency (NISRA). As of the 2011 census, there were 986 people living there. Of these:

- 69% of the population was from a Roman Catholic background
- 20% of the population was from a Protestant background
- 3% of the population had no religion
- 8% of the population was from a foreign country
- 63% of the population was aged 18 – 75
- 30% of the population was aged 0 – 18
- 7% of the population was aged 75+
- 59% of the population were female
- 41% of the population were male
- 36% of the population were unemployed

== Notable people ==
- Provisional Irish Republican Army member Matt Devlin who took part in the 1981 Irish Hunger Strike and was later a leading member of Sinn Féin in County Westmeath
- Tyrone Gaelic footballers Tommy McGuigan, Brian McGuigan and their father, Frank McGuigan, Patsy McNally, Eugene Devlin and James Og Devlin and Denis Rocks are from the area.
- Polly Devlin, author, journalist, broadcaster and film-maker.
- Kyle Coney, Tyrone minor Gaelic player
- Screenwriter and member of the Horslips, Barry Devlin, whose My Mother and Other Strangers is set in Moybeg, a fictional village on Lough Neagh which was based on Ardboe.
- Michael Forbes, Dundee United footballer, made his Northern Ireland senior debut in November 2023, aged 19.

== See also ==
- Abbeys and priories in Northern Ireland (County Tyrone)
- List of villages in Northern Ireland
- List of towns in Northern Ireland
- List of civil parishes of County Tyrone
