= The Troubles in Ardboe =

Incidents in Ardboe, Northern Ireland during the Troubles

A list of notable incidents during The Troubles in Ardboe, County Tyrone, Northern Ireland.

== 1972 ==
- 16 October – Official Irish Republican Army (OIRA) members John Patrick Mullan (34) and Hugh Herron (38) were shot and killed by British Army soldiers in the carpark of St. Patrick's Hall, Ardboe. The location was being used as a vehicle check point.

== 1977 ==
- 2 June – Royal Ulster Constabulary (RUC) officers Hugh Martin (58), Samuel Davison (24) and Norman Lynch (22) were shot dead by Provisional Irish Republican Army (PIRA) snipers while on mobile patrol in Carnan.

== 1978 ==
- 26 February – Paul Duffy (23), an IRA member, was shot by an undercover British Army Special Air Service (SAS) member at an arms cache in an unoccupied farmhouse. This was the first time the SAS had been used in action outside of South Armagh.

== 1979 ==
- 22 June – John "Jack" Scott (49), an off-duty member of the RUC Reserve, was shot by the IRA while delivering milk in Ardboe.

== 1984 ==
- 13 July – IRA member William Price (28) was shot dead by an SAS unit during an attempted incendiary bomb attack against Forbes kitchen factory at 1:00 am. Two other IRA members, Raymond Francis O'Neill and Thomas Quillan, were captured by soldiers from the 'cut-off group' as they fled onto Mullanahoe Road opposite the factory. They were later sentenced to nine years in prison. A fourth IRA member escaped.

== 1988 ==
- 26 April – Edward 'Ned' Gibson (22), an off-duty member of the Ulster Defence Regiment (UDR), was shot by the IRA while working as a bin man in Moortown.

== 1989 ==
- 30 November – Liam Ryan (39), an IRA member, was shot dead in the Battery Bar by the Ulster Volunteer Force. A Catholic civilian, Michael Devlin (33), was also killed.

== 1993 ==
- 18 August – RUC officers seized three AKM assault rifles and 2,000 rounds of ammunition after conducting a search of a local GAA club.
