= 1977 Cookstown District Council election =

Local govt election in Northern Ireland

- 18 May 1977

All 15 seats to Cookstown District Council 8 seats needed for a majority
	First party	Second party	Third party
Party	SDLP	UUP	UUUP
Seats won	5	4	3
Seat change	▲2	▼4	▲3
	Fourth party	Fifth party	Sixth party
Party	DUP	Ind. Nationalist	Ind. Republican
Seats won	1	1	1
Seat change	▲1	▼1	▲1
	Seventh party	Eighth party
Party	Republican Clubs	Loyalist Coalition
Seats won	0	0
Seat change	▼1	▼1

Elections to Cookstown District Council were held on 18 May 1977 on the same day as the other Northern Irish local government elections. The election used three district electoral areas to elect a total of 15 councillors.

== Election results ==
Cookstown District Council Election Result 1977
Party	Seats	Gains	Losses	Net gain/loss	Seats %	Votes %	Votes	+/−
SDLP	5	2	0	▲2	33.3	30.2	4,337	▲12.0
UUP	4	0	4	▼4	26.7	28.4	4,081	▼11.7
UUUP	3	3	0	▲3	20.0	14.8	2,131	New
Ind. Republican	1	1	0	▲1	6.7	6.4	924	▲6.4
DUP	1	1	0	▲1	6.7	5.9	846	New
Ind. Nationalist	1	0	1	▼1	6.7	5.8	840	▼2.9
Alliance	0	0	0	Steady	0.0	5.2	746	▼1.1
Republican Clubs	0	0	1	▼1	0.0	3.2	464	▼8.6

Note: "Votes" are the first preference votes.

== Districts summary ==
Results of the Cookstown District Council election, 1977 by district
Ward	%	Cllrs	%	Cllrs	%	Cllrs	%	Cllrs	%	Cllrs	Total Cllrs
Ward	SDLP		UUP		UUUP		DUP		Others		Total Cllrs
Area A	19.1	1	22.8	1	11.0	1	17.7	1	29.4	1	5
Area B	35.3	2	16.5	1	28.4	2	0.0	0	19.8	1	6
Area C	36.3	2	52.4	2	0.0	0	0.0	0	11.3	0	4
Total	30.2	5	28.4	4	14.8	3	5.9	1	20.7	2	15

== Districts results ==
=== Area A ===
1973: 2 x UUP, 1 x Republican Clubs, 1 x Loyalist Coalition, 1 x Independent Nationalist
1977: 1 x UUP, 1 x SDLP, 1 x DUP, 1 x UUUP, 1 x Independent Nationalist
1973-1977 Change: SDLP and DUP gain from UUP and Republican Clubs, Loyalist Coalition joins UUUP

Cookstown Area A - 5 seats
Party	Candidate	FPv%	Count					
Party	Candidate	FPv%	1	2	3	4	5	6
DUP	Richard Reid	17.67%	846					
Ind. Nationalist	Laurence Loughran*	17.54%	840					
SDLP	Peter Kelly	12.87%	616	630	890			
UUP	Samuel Glasgow*	14.95%	716	745	746	747.5	1,085.5	
UUUP	Samuel Parke*	10.96%	525	529	529	531.25	581.25	848.25
Republican Clubs	Desmond Gourley	9.69%	464	471	490	573.25	573.25	574.25
UUP	Stanley Glasgow	7.83%	375	401	403	406		
SDLP	Charles O'Neill	6.22%	298	308				
Alliance	J. R. W. O'Connor	2.26%	108					
Electorate: 5,982 Valid: 4,788 (80.04%) Spoilt: 183 Quota: 799 Turnout: 4,971 (83.10%)

=== Area B ===
1973: 3 x UUP, 2 x SDLP, 1 x Independent Nationalist
1977: 2 x SDLP, 2 x UUUP, 1 x UUP, 1 x Independent Republican
1973-1977 Change: UUUP (two seats) and Independent Republican gain from UUP (two seats) and Independent Nationalist

Cookstown Area B - 6 seats
Party	Candidate	FPv%	Count				
Party	Candidate	FPv%	1	2	3	4	5
SDLP	Paddy Duffy*	17.21%	973				
UUP	James Howard*	16.47%	931				
Ind. Republican	Michael McIvor	16.34%	924				
UUUP	Victor McGahie*	16.29%	921				
UUUP	William McIntyre*	12.12%	685	685.85	778.54	856.54	
SDLP	Joseph Davidson*	10.42%	589	705.62	706.14	728.68	772.68
SDLP	James Malone	7.71%	436	473.74	474.65	500.27	569.67
Alliance	Austin Hutchinson	3.45%	195	197.38	219.61		
Electorate: 7,343 Valid: 5,654 (77.00%) Spoilt: 227 Quota: 808 Turnout: 5,881 (80.09%)

=== Area C ===
1973: 3 x UUP, 1 x SDLP
1977: 2 x UUP, 2 x SDLP
1973-1977 Change: SDLP gain from UUP

Cookstown Area C - 4 seats
Party	Candidate	FPv%	Count				
Party	Candidate	FPv%	1	2	3	4	5
UUP	Espie Donaldson*	25.92%	1,018				
SDLP	Brigid Neeson*	20.40%	801				
UUP	John Warwick*	18.05%	709	804.68			
SDLP	Margaret Laverty	15.89%	624	624.69	624.69	728.73	736.49
UUP	Alexander McConnell*	8.45%	332	458.73	474.41	730.44	730.5
Alliance	Basil McNamee	11.28%	443	450.82	451.46		
Electorate: 5,206 Valid: 3,927 (75.43%) Spoilt: 121 Quota: 786 Turnout: 4,048 (77.76%)
