= Tommy McGuigan =

Irish Gaelic footballer

Personal information
- Born: County Tyrone

Sport
- Sport: Gaelic Football
- Position: Corner forward
Club
- Years: Club
- Ardboe O'Donovan Rossa
Inter-county
Years	County	Apps (scores)
2006-2013	Tyrone	1 (3)
Inter-county titles
- Ulster titles: 3
- All-Irelands: 1
- NFL: 0
- All Stars: 0

Tommy McGuigan is a former Gaelic footballer who played for the Ardboe O'Donnovan Rossa club and the Tyrone county team. He made his Ulster Championship debut for Tyrone on 20 May 2007, against Fermanagh.

== Family ==
McGuigan's father Frank won several club and inter-county titles (and an All-Star) and his older brother Brian won three All-Ireland Senior Football Championships while playing for Tyrone. In 2008, Tommy and Brian McGuigan picked up All-Ireland SFC winning medals and their older brother Frank also has an All-Ireland medal to his name as a result of being on the 2003 panel.

Youngest brother Shay McGuigan was also a member of the Tyrone All-Ireland winning minor panel of 2008 and is in his second year playing for the Tyrone minors.

== Playing career ==
In his championship debut against Fermanagh, McGuigan scored three points, as Tyrone were playing through difficult portions of the match.

This performance was later dulled somewhat, "by the fact that he has picked up a broken wrist, and may miss the rest of the Ulster Senior Football Championship, should Tyrone progress".

During the 2008 championship, McGuigan scored a vital goal at the start of the second half of the 2008 All-Ireland Final. He finished the season with a tally of 1-21 (24 points).

== Twitter incidents ==
On 29 July 2014, Tommy McGuigan posted a tweet, which was described as antisemitic and which he later removed. McGuigan later apologised for the remark, claiming it was written as a joke and was meant as "nothing serious". McGuigan said he had passed his number onto a London-based Jewish columnist, who requested to speak with him in order to confront him over his comment. "I said it was meant as a joke, nothing serious. He agreed to let it go."

On 3 August 2014, McGuigan posted a message with a racist and derogatory term for Hispanic people on his Twitter account: "“@ryanbulldog83 @McIlroyRory course. Sergio shitting his Spick pants. Happy Gilmore cunt”" in reference to Rory McIlroy passing Spanish golfer Sergio García at the WGC-Bridgestone Invitational golf tournament.
