= O'Donovan Rossa GAA =

O'Donovan Rossa GAA may refer to:

- O'Donovan Rossa GAA (Cork), a sports club in Skibbereen, Ireland

== See also ==
- O'Donovan Rossa GAC (Antrim), a sports club in Belfast
- Ardboe O'Donovan Rossa GAC, a sports club
- Magherafelt GAC, a sports club occasionally known as O'Donovan Rossa Magherafelt
