= Cookstown Area B =

District electoral areas in Cookstown, Northern Ireland

Cookstown Area B was one of the three district electoral areas in Cookstown, Northern Ireland which existed from 1973 to 1985. The district elected six members to Cookstown District Council, and formed part of the Mid Ulster constituencies for the Northern Ireland Assembly and UK Parliament.

It was created for the 1973 local elections, and contained the wards of Ardboe, Coach, Killycoply, Moneymore, Stewartstown and The Loop. It was abolished for the 1985 local elections and replaced by the Ballinderry DEA.

== Councillors ==
Election	Councillor (Party)	Councillor (Party)	Councillor (Party)	Councillor (Party)	Councillor (Party)	Councillor (Party)
1981	William McIntyre (DUP)/ (UUUP)/ (UUP)	Victor McGahie (UUP)/ (UUUP)	James Howard (UUP)	Paddy Duffy (SDLP)	Joseph Davidson (SDLP)	Michael McIvor (Independent Republican)
1977	William McIntyre (DUP)/ (UUUP)/ (UUP)	Victor McGahie (UUP)/ (UUUP)	James Howard (UUP)	Paddy Duffy (SDLP)	Joseph Davidson (SDLP)	Michael McIvor (Independent Republican)
1973	William McIntyre (DUP)/ (UUUP)/ (UUP)	Victor McGahie (UUP)/ (UUUP)	James Howard (UUP)	Paddy Duffy (SDLP)	Joseph Davidson (SDLP)	J. J. O'Kane (Independent Nationalist)

== 1981 Election ==
1977: 2 x SDLP, 2 x UUUP, 1 x UUP, 1 x Independent Republican

1981: 2 x SDLP, 2 x UUP, 1 x DUP, 1 x Independent Republican

1977-1981 Change: UUP and DUP gain from UUUP (two seats)

Cookstown Area B - 6 seats
Party	Candidate	FPv%	Count				
Party	Candidate	FPv%	1	2	3	4	5
DUP	William McIntyre*	23.51%	1,502				
SDLP	Paddy Duffy*	18.74%	1,197				
Ind. Republican	Michael McIvor*	15.09%	964				
UUP	Victor McGahie*	11.29%	721	1,142.98			
UUP	James Howard*	11.27%	720	881.07	882.03	1,109.29	
SDLP	Joseph Davidson*	9.47%	605	605.78	834.74	835.18	838.04
Independent	Edward Hagan	10.63%	679	679.39	731.71	731.71	734.35
Electorate: 7,342 Valid: 6,388 (87.01%) Spoilt: 147 Quota: 913 Turnout: 6,535 (89.01%)

== 1977 Election ==
1973: 3 x UUP, 2 x SDLP, 1 x Independent Nationalist

1977: 2 x SDLP, 2 x UUUP, 1 x UUP, 1 x Independent Republican

1973-1977 Change: UUUP (two seats) and Independent Republican gain from UUP (two seats) and Independent Nationalist

Cookstown Area B - 6 seats
Party	Candidate	FPv%	Count				
Party	Candidate	FPv%	1	2	3	4	5
SDLP	Paddy Duffy*	17.21%	973				
UUP	James Howard*	16.47%	931				
Ind. Republican	Michael McIvor	16.34%	924				
UUUP	Victor McGahie*	16.29%	921				
UUUP	William McIntyre*	12.12%	685	685.85	778.54	856.54	
SDLP	Joseph Davidson*	10.42%	589	705.62	706.14	728.68	772.68
SDLP	James Malone	7.71%	436	473.74	474.65	500.27	569.67
Alliance	Austin Hutchinson	3.45%	195	197.38	219.61		
Electorate: 7,343 Valid: 5,654 (77.00%) Spoilt: 227 Quota: 808 Turnout: 5,881 (80.09%)

== 1973 Election ==
1973: 3 x UUP, 2 x SDLP, 1 x Independent Nationalist

Cookstown Area B - 6 seats
Party	Candidate	FPv%	Count						
Party	Candidate	FPv%	1	2	3	4	5	6	7
UUP	James Howard	18.23%	1,050						
UUP	Victor McGahie	17.43%	1,004						
SDLP	Paddy Duffy	17.41%	1,003						
UUP	William McIntyre	12.43%	716	915.92					
Ind. Nationalist	J. J. O'Kane	12.58%	725	725	727.76	748.46	749.31	772.29	987.29
SDLP	Joseph Davidson	7.98%	460	460.42	460.88	586.34	586.51	611.67	774.85
Alliance	Austin Hutchinson	4.34%	250	269.32	444.12	450.6	537.81	541.71	554.15
Republican Clubs	F. Crozier	4.88%	281	281	281	291.8	291.97	515.73	
Republican Clubs	Rita Heron	4.72%	272	272	272.46	285.42	285.42		
Electorate: 7,153 Valid: 5,761 (80.54%) Spoilt: 98 Quota: 824 Turnout: 5,859 (81.91%)
