= Richard Reid (Northern Ireland politician) =

Unionist politician from Northern Ireland

Member of Cookstown District Council
- In office 18 May 1977 – 20 May 1981
- Preceded by: N.Glasgow
- Succeeded by: Kenneth Loughrin
- Constituency: Cookstown Area A

Constitutional Convention Member for Mid Ulster
- In office 1975–1976
- Preceded by: New convention
- Succeeded by: Convention abolished

Personal details
- Born: County Tyrone, Northern Ireland
- Political party: DUP

Richard Reid is a former Northern Irish unionist politician.

== Background ==
Reid worked as a farmer in Pomeroy, County Tyrone. An evangelical Protestant, he became friendly with Norman Porter, secretary of the National Union of Protestants. In 1950, he arranged a meeting at the town courthouse for Monica Farrell, and through this, became acquainted with Ian Paisley. He subsequently joined Paisley's Free Presbyterian Church of Ulster, and, although there was no local congregation, he became a church elder.

In 1975, Reid stood for Paisley's Democratic Unionist Party in Mid Ulster, and was elected to the Northern Ireland Constitutional Convention. He was also elected to Cookstown District Council at the 1977 Northern Ireland local elections.

From the 1980s on, Reid withdrew from formal politics, but he was active in the Orange Order, where he became known as a leading traditionalist during the Drumcree conflict.

Northern Ireland Constitutional Convention
New convention	Member for Mid-Ulster; 1975–1976	Convention dissolved
