= Cookstown Area A =

District electoral areas in Cookstown, Northern Ireland

Cookstown Area A was one of the three district electoral areas in Cookstown, Northern Ireland which existed from 1973 to 1985. The district elected five members to Cookstown District Council, and formed part of the Mid Ulster constituencies for the Northern Ireland Assembly and UK Parliament.

It was created for the 1973 local elections, and contained the wards of Dunamore, Lissan, Oaklands, Pomeroy and Sandholes. It was abolished for the 1985 local elections and replaced by the Drum Manor DEA.

== Councillors ==
Election	Councillor (Party)	Councillor (Party)	Councillor (Party)	Councillor (Party)	Councillor (Party)
1981	Samuel Parke (UUUP)/ (Loyalist Coalition)	Kenneth Loughrin (DUP)	Samuel Glasgow (UUP)	Patrick Bradley (SDLP)	Laurence Loughran (Independent Nationalist)
1977	Samuel Parke (UUUP)/ (Loyalist Coalition)	Richard Reid (DUP)	Samuel Glasgow (UUP)	Peter Kelly (SDLP)	Laurence Loughran (Independent Nationalist)
1973	Samuel Parke (UUUP)/ (Loyalist Coalition)	N. Glasgow (UUP)	S. Glasgow (UUP)	G. McElhatton (Republican Clubs)	Laurence Loughran (Independent Nationalist)

== 1981 Election ==
1977: 1 x SDLP, 1 x DUP, 1 x UUP, 1 x UUUP, 1 x Independent Nationalist

1981: 1 x SDLP, 1 x DUP, 1 x UUP, 1 x UUUP, 1 x Independent Nationalist

1977-1981 Change: No change

Cookstown Area A - 5 seats
Party	Candidate	FPv%	Count			
Party	Candidate	FPv%	1	2	3	4
DUP	Kenneth Loughrin	21.81%	1,087			
Ind. Nationalist	Laurence Loughran*	21.52%	1,073			
UUP	Samuel Glasgow*	21.46%	1,070			
UUUP	Samuel Parke*	9.43%	470	711.96	719.55	950.93
SDLP	Patrick Bradley	14.48%	722	723.38	822.05	822.74
SDLP	Peter Kelly*	11.29%	563	565.07	692.49	692.95
Electorate: 5,876 Valid: 4,985 (84.84%) Spoilt: 164 Quota: 831 Turnout: 5,149 (87.63%)

== 1977 Election ==
1973: 2 x UUP, 1 x Republican Clubs, 1 x Loyalist Coalition, 1 x Independent Nationalist

1977: 1 x UUP, 1 x SDLP, 1 x DUP, 1 x UUUP, 1 x Independent Nationalist

1973-1977 Change: SDLP and DUP gain from UUP and Republican Clubs, Loyalist Coalition joins UUUP

Cookstown Area A - 5 seats
Party	Candidate	FPv%	Count					
Party	Candidate	FPv%	1	2	3	4	5	6
DUP	Richard Reid	17.67%	846					
Ind. Nationalist	Laurence Loughran*	17.54%	840					
SDLP	Peter Kelly	12.87%	616	630	890			
UUP	Samuel Glasgow*	14.95%	716	745	746	747.5	1,085.5	
UUUP	Samuel Parke*	10.96%	525	529	529	531.25	581.25	848.25
Republican Clubs	Desmond Gourley	9.69%	464	471	490	573.25	573.25	574.25
UUP	Stanley Glasgow	7.83%	375	401	403	406		
SDLP	Charles O'Neill	6.22%	298	308				
Alliance	J. R. W. O'Connor	2.26%	108					
Electorate: 5,982 Valid: 4,788 (80.04%) Spoilt: 183 Quota: 799 Turnout: 4,971 (83.10%)

== 1973 Election ==
1973: 2 x UUP, 1 x Loyalist Coalition, 1 x Republican Clubs, 1 x Independent Nationalist

Cookstown Area A - 5 seats
Party	Candidate	FPv%	Count						
Party	Candidate	FPv%	1	2	3	4	5	6	7
Loyalist Coalition	Samuel Parke	23.27%	1,137						
Ind. Nationalist	Laurence Loughran	11.27%	551	551	556	616.31	661.31	967.31	
Republican Clubs	G. McElhatton	8.64%	422	422	458	466	808	885	
UUP	N. Glasgow	13.16%	643	737.24	737.24	755.24	757.24	762.24	775.24
UUP	S. Glasgow	10.99%	537	693.55	693.55	708.86	708.86	711.86	716.86
UUP	J. Gourley	9.90%	484	545.69	548.69	563.69	563.69	570.69	599.69
SDLP	G. McKeown	7.78%	380	380.31	397.31	494.31	516.31		
Republican Clubs	P. Monaghan	6.51%	318	318	408	424			
Alliance	T. P. Sharpe	4.71%	230	232.48	265.48				
Republican Clubs	C. O'Neill	2.72%	133	133.31					
Alliance	J. E. McGurk	1.06%	52	52					
Electorate: 5,947 Valid: 4,887 (82.18%) Spoilt: 123 Quota: 815 Turnout: 5,010 (84.24%)
