= Saint Colmán of Ardboe =

6th–7th century Irish saint and abbot

- Born: Ireland
- Died: 7th century Ireland
- Venerated in: Roman Catholicism
- Feast: 21 February

Colmán of Ardboe, also known as Colmán mac Áed and nicknamed Muccaid (meaning "swineherd"), was a 6th–7th century Irish saint traditionally recognized for founding the early Christian monastery at Ardboe, County Tyrone, on the shores of Lough Neagh in 590. The abbey he founded is traditionally believed to have housed his tomb before being destroyed by fire in 1166 by Ruaidrí, son of Mac Canai; a son of Gilla Muire Ua Monrai; and the Crotraighe. Rawlinson B 502 identifies him as Muccaide, son of Áed Guaire, son of Amalgaid, son of Muiredach, son of Carthend, son of Erc, son of Colla Uais. He is also recorded as the father of Máel-Aithé and Fergus (died in 668).

== See also ==
- Ardboe High Cross
