= 1981 Cookstown District Council election =

Local govt election in Northern Ireland

- 20 May 1981

All 15 seats to Cookstown District Council 8 seats needed for a majority
	First party	Second party	Third party
Party	SDLP	UUP	DUP
Seats won	5	4	3
Seat change	0	0	▲2
	Fourth party	Fifth party	Sixth party
Party	UUUP	Ind. Nationalist	Ind. Republican
Seats won	1	1	1
Seat change	▼2	0	0

Elections to Cookstown District Council were held on 20 May 1981 on the same day as the other Northern Irish local government elections. The election used three district electoral areas to elect a total of 15 councillors.

== Election results ==
Cookstown District Council Election Result 1981
Party	Seats	Gains	Losses	Net gain/loss	Seats %	Votes %	Votes	+/−
SDLP	5	0	0	0	33.3	31.4	5,098	▲1.2
UUP	4	1	1	0	26.7	24.7	4,002	▼3.7
DUP	3	2	0	▲2	20.0	24.3	3,945	▲18.4
UUUP	1	0	2	▼2	6.7	2.9	470	▼11.9
Ind. Nationalist	1	0	0	0	6.7	6.6	1,073	▲0.8
Ind. Republican	1	0	0	0	6.7	5.9	964	▼0.5
Independent	0	0	0	0	0.0	4.2	679	▲4.2

Note: "Votes" are the first preference votes.

== Districts summary ==
Results of the Cookstown District Council election, 1981 by district
Ward	%	Cllrs	%	Cllrs	%	Cllrs	%	Cllrs	%	Cllrs	Total Cllrs
Ward	SDLP		UUP		DUP		UUUP		Others		Total Cllrs
Area A	25.8	1	21.5	1	21.8	1	9.4	1	21.5	1	5
Area B	28.2	2	22.6	2	23.5	1	0.0	0	25.7	1	6
Area C	41.4	2	30.7	1	27.9	1	0.0	0	0.0	0	4
Total	31.4	5	24.7	4	24.3	3	2.9	3	16.7	2	15

== Districts results ==
=== Area A ===
1977: 1 x SDLP, 1 x DUP, 1 x UUP, 1 x UUUP, 1 x Independent Nationalist
1981: 1 x SDLP, 1 x DUP, 1 x UUP, 1 x UUUP, 1 x Independent Nationalist
1977-1981 Change: No change

Cookstown Area A - 5 seats
Party	Candidate	FPv%	Count			
Party	Candidate	FPv%	1	2	3	4
DUP	Kenneth Loughrin	21.81%	1,087			
Ind. Nationalist	Laurence Loughran*	21.52%	1,073			
UUP	Samuel Glasgow*	21.46%	1,070			
UUUP	Samuel Parke*	9.43%	470	711.96	719.55	950.93
SDLP	Patrick Bradley	14.48%	722	723.38	822.05	822.74
SDLP	Peter Kelly*	11.29%	563	565.07	692.49	692.95
Electorate: 5,876 Valid: 4,985 (84.84%) Spoilt: 164 Quota: 831 Turnout: 5,149 (87.63%)

=== Area B ===
1977: 2 x SDLP, 2 x UUUP, 1 x UUP, 1 x Independent Republican
1981: 2 x SDLP, 2 x UUP, 1 x DUP, 1 x Independent Republican
1977-1981 Change: UUP and DUP gain from UUUP (two seats)

Cookstown Area B - 6 seats
Party	Candidate	FPv%	Count				
Party	Candidate	FPv%	1	2	3	4	5
DUP	William McIntyre*	23.51%	1,502				
SDLP	Paddy Duffy*	18.74%	1,197				
Ind. Republican	Michael McIvor*	15.09%	964				
UUP	Victor McGahie*	11.29%	721	1,142.98			
UUP	James Howard*	11.27%	720	881.07	882.03	1,109.29	
SDLP	Joseph Davidson*	9.47%	605	605.78	834.74	835.18	838.04
Independent	Edward Hagan	10.63%	679	679.39	731.71	731.71	734.35
Electorate: 7,342 Valid: 6,388 (87.01%) Spoilt: 147 Quota: 913 Turnout: 6,535 (89.01%)

=== Area C ===
1977: 2 x SDLP, 2 x UUP
1981: 2 x SDLP, 1 x UUP, 1 x DUP
1977-1981 Change: DUP gain from UUP

Cookstown Area C - 4 seats
Party	Candidate	FPv%	Count				
Party	Candidate	FPv%	1	2	3	4	5
DUP	Alan Kane	27.91%	1,356				
SDLP	Brigid Neeson*	22.21%	1,079				
UUP	Espie Donaldson*	19.14%	930	1,175.63			
SDLP	Margaret Laverty*	19.18%	932	932.87	933.35	934.64	1,038.84
UUP	John Warwick*	6.75%	328	432.98	557.54	863.63	864.83
UUP	Alexander McConnell	4.80%	233	263.74	337.66		
Electorate: 5,782 Valid: 4,858 (84.02%) Spoilt: 88 Quota: 972 Turnout: 4,946 (85.54%)
