= 1973 Cookstown District Council election =

Local govt election in Northern Ireland

- 30 May 1973

All 15 seats to Cookstown District Council 8 seats needed for a majority
	First party	Second party	Third party
Party	UUP	SDLP	Ind. Nationalist
Seats won	8	3	2
	Fourth party	Fifth party
Party	Republican Clubs	Loyalist Coalition
Seats won	1	1

Elections to Cookstown District Council were held on 30 May 1973 on the same day as the other Northern Irish local government elections. The election used three district electoral areas to elect a total of 15 councillors.

== Election results ==
Party	Seats	±	First Pref. votes	FPv%	±%
UUP	8		6,428	43.7	
SDLP	3		2,671	18.2	
Ind. Nationalist	2		1,276	8.7	
Republican Clubs	1		1,741	11.8	
Loyalist Coalition	1		1,652	11.2	
Alliance	0		925	6.3	
Totals	15		14,693	100.0	—

== Districts summary ==
Results of the Cookstown District Council election, 1973 by district
Ward	%	Cllrs	%	Cllrs	%	Cllrs	%	Cllrs	Total Cllrs
Ward	UUP		SDLP		RC		Others		Total Cllrs
Area A	34.0	2	7.8	0	17.9	1	40.3	2	5
Area B	48.1	3	25.4	2	9.6	0	16.9	1	6
Area C	49.3	3	20.5	1	7.8	0	22.4	0	4
Total	43.7	8	18.2	3	11.8	1	26.3	3	15

== Districts results ==
=== Area A ===
1973: 2 x UUP, 1 x Loyalist Coalition, 1 x Republican Clubs, 1 x Independent Nationalist

Cookstown Area A - 5 seats
Party	Candidate	FPv%	Count						
Party	Candidate	FPv%	1	2	3	4	5	6	7
Loyalist Coalition	Samuel Parke	23.27%	1,137						
Ind. Nationalist	Laurence Loughran	11.27%	551	551	556	616.31	661.31	967.31	
Republican Clubs	G. McElhatton	8.64%	422	422	458	466	808	885	
UUP	N. Glasgow	13.16%	643	737.24	737.24	755.24	757.24	762.24	775.24
UUP	S. Glasgow	10.99%	537	693.55	693.55	708.86	708.86	711.86	716.86
UUP	J. Gourley	9.90%	484	545.69	548.69	563.69	563.69	570.69	599.69
SDLP	G. McKeown	7.78%	380	380.31	397.31	494.31	516.31		
Republican Clubs	P. Monaghan	6.51%	318	318	408	424			
Alliance	T. P. Sharpe	4.71%	230	232.48	265.48				
Republican Clubs	C. O'Neill	2.72%	133	133.31					
Alliance	J. E. McGurk	1.06%	52	52					
Electorate: 5,947 Valid: 4,887 (82.18%) Spoilt: 123 Quota: 815 Turnout: 5,010 (84.24%)

=== Area B ===
1973: 3 x UUP, 2 x SDLP, 1 x Independent Nationalist

Cookstown Area B - 6 seats
Party	Candidate	FPv%	Count						
Party	Candidate	FPv%	1	2	3	4	5	6	7
UUP	James Howard	18.23%	1,050						
UUP	Victor McGahie	17.43%	1,004						
SDLP	Paddy Duffy	17.41%	1,003						
UUP	William McIntyre	12.43%	716	915.92					
Ind. Nationalist	J. J. O'Kane	12.58%	725	725	727.76	748.46	749.31	772.29	987.29
SDLP	Joseph Davidson	7.98%	460	460.42	460.88	586.34	586.51	611.67	774.85
Alliance	Austin Hutchinson	4.34%	250	269.32	444.12	450.6	537.81	541.71	554.15
Republican Clubs	F. Crozier	4.88%	281	281	281	291.8	291.97	515.73	
Republican Clubs	Rita Heron	4.72%	272	272	272.46	285.42	285.42		
Electorate: 7,153 Valid: 5,761 (80.54%) Spoilt: 98 Quota: 824 Turnout: 5,859 (81.91%)

=== Area C ===
1973: 3 x UUP, 1 x SDLP

Cookstown Area C - 4 seats
Party	Candidate	FPv%	Count									
Party	Candidate	FPv%	1	2	3	4	5	6	7	8	9	10
UUP	Espie Donaldson	25.44%	1,029									
UUP	Alexander McConnell	12.81%	518	658.49	658.49	684.53	703.58	703.58	837.5			
UUP	John Warwick	11.05%	447	481.65	481.65	490.91	492.33	492.33	530.38	550.78	918.78	
SDLP	Brigid Neeson	11.59%	469	469.21	469.21	471.21	472.21	565.21	637.21	639.85	641.75	652.75
SDLP	J. McCrystal	8.88%	359	359	379	379	389	509	575	576.68	578.18	586.18
Loyalist Coalition	G. B. Somerville	9.62%	389	413.36	413.36	506.93	509.35	510.35	532.4	534.8		
Alliance	Basil McNamee	5.69%	230	232.21	232.21	233.52	369.94	379.94				
Republican Clubs	S. McElroy	4.55%	184	184	288	288	290					
Alliance	Mary Lennox	4.03%	163	165.52	170.52	173.73						
Loyalist Coalition	R. J. K. Loughran	3.11%	126	136.29	136.29							
Republican Clubs	H. Bradley	3.24%	131	131								
Electorate: 5,159 Valid: 4,045 (78.41%) Spoilt: 48 Quota: 810 Turnout: 4,093 (79.34%)
