= Cookstown Area C =

District electoral areas in Cookstown, Northern Ireland

Cookstown Area C was one of the three district electoral areas in Cookstown, Northern Ireland which existed from 1973 to 1985. The district elected four members to Cookstown District Council, and formed part of the Mid Ulster constituencies for the Northern Ireland Assembly and UK Parliament.

It was created for the 1973 local elections, and contained the wards of Gortalowry, Newbuildings, Old Town and Tullagh. It was abolished for the 1985 local elections and replaced by the Cookstown Central DEA.

== Councillors ==
Election	Councillor (Party)	Councillor (Party)	Councillor (Party)	Councillor (Party)
1981	Alan Kane (DUP)	Espie Donaldson (UUP)	Margaret Laverty (SDLP)	Brigid Neeson (SDLP)
1977	John Warwick (UUP)	Espie Donaldson (UUP)	Margaret Laverty (SDLP)	Brigid Neeson (SDLP)
1973	John Warwick (UUP)	Espie Donaldson (UUP)	Alexander McConnell (UUP)	Brigid Neeson (SDLP)

== 1981 Election ==
1977: 2 x SDLP, 2 x UUP

1981: 2 x SDLP, 1 x UUP, 1 x DUP

1977-1981 Change: DUP gain from UUP

Cookstown Area C - 4 seats
Party	Candidate	FPv%	Count				
Party	Candidate	FPv%	1	2	3	4	5
DUP	Alan Kane	27.91%	1,356				
SDLP	Brigid Neeson*	22.21%	1,079				
UUP	Espie Donaldson*	19.14%	930	1,175.63			
SDLP	Margaret Laverty*	19.18%	932	932.87	933.35	934.64	1,038.84
UUP	John Warwick*	6.75%	328	432.98	557.54	863.63	864.83
UUP	Alexander McConnell	4.80%	233	263.74	337.66		
Electorate: 5,782 Valid: 4,858 (84.02%) Spoilt: 88 Quota: 972 Turnout: 4,946 (85.54%)

== 1977 Election ==
1973: 3 x UUP, 1 x SDLP

1977: 2 x UUP, 2 x SDLP

1973-1977 Change: SDLP gain from UUP

Cookstown Area C - 4 seats
Party	Candidate	FPv%	Count				
Party	Candidate	FPv%	1	2	3	4	5
UUP	Espie Donaldson*	25.92%	1,018				
SDLP	Brigid Neeson*	20.40%	801				
UUP	John Warwick*	18.05%	709	804.68			
SDLP	Margaret Laverty	15.89%	624	624.69	624.69	728.73	736.49
UUP	Alexander McConnell*	8.45%	332	458.73	474.41	730.44	730.5
Alliance	Basil McNamee	11.28%	443	450.82	451.46		
Electorate: 5,206 Valid: 3,927 (75.43%) Spoilt: 121 Quota: 786 Turnout: 4,048 (77.76%)

== 1973 Election ==
1973: 3 x UUP, 1 x SDLP

Cookstown Area C - 4 seats
Party	Candidate	FPv%	Count									
Party	Candidate	FPv%	1	2	3	4	5	6	7	8	9	10
UUP	Espie Donaldson	25.44%	1,029									
UUP	Alexander McConnell	12.81%	518	658.49	658.49	684.53	703.58	703.58	837.5			
UUP	John Warwick	11.05%	447	481.65	481.65	490.91	492.33	492.33	530.38	550.78	918.78	
SDLP	Brigid Neeson	11.59%	469	469.21	469.21	471.21	472.21	565.21	637.21	639.85	641.75	652.75
SDLP	J. McCrystal	8.88%	359	359	379	379	389	509	575	576.68	578.18	586.18
Loyalist Coalition	G. B. Somerville	9.62%	389	413.36	413.36	506.93	509.35	510.35	532.4	534.8		
Alliance	Basil McNamee	5.69%	230	232.21	232.21	233.52	369.94	379.94				
Republican Clubs	S. McElroy	4.55%	184	184	288	288	290					
Alliance	Mary Lennox	4.03%	163	165.52	170.52	173.73						
Loyalist Coalition	R. J. K. Loughran	3.11%	126	136.29	136.29							
Republican Clubs	H. Bradley	3.24%	131	131								
Electorate: 5,159 Valid: 4,045 (78.41%) Spoilt: 48 Quota: 810 Turnout: 4,093 (79.34%)
