= Ardboe High Cross =

High cross in County Tyrone, Northern Ireland

- Ardboe Cross
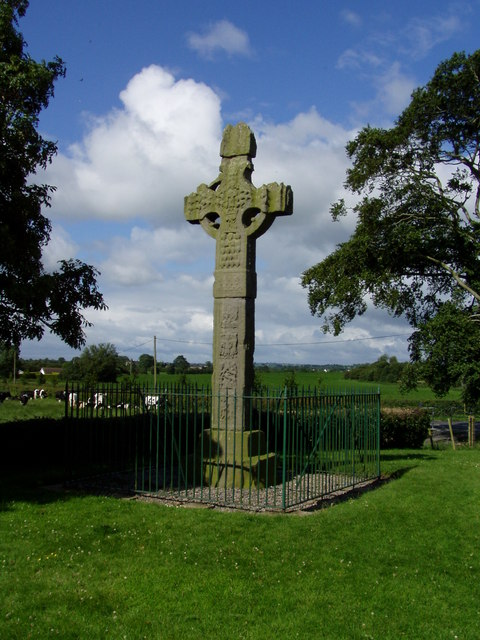
- Looking at the east face of the cross
- Year: 10th century (Julian)
- Medium: stone
- Subject: Bible
- Dimensions: 18.5 ft (5.6 m) × 3.5 ft (1.1 m)
- Designation: scheduled monument
- Location: Ardboe, Northern Ireland, United Kingdom
- Coordinates: 54°37′10″N 6°30′19″W

Ardboe High Cross (Irish: Seanchrois Ard Bó) is a high cross and national monument dating from the tenth century located in Ardboe, County Tyrone, Northern Ireland.

The cross stands at the entrance to a cemetery and a monastery and a church from the seventeenth century which was founded in 590 by Saint Colman. The monastery was destroyed by fire in the twelfth century. It is believed to have been erected in either the ninth or the tenth century. The name "Ard Boe", which is an english variation of the irish word ard bó in the gaelic spelling means "hill of the cow" it comes from a legend that the monastery of Ardboe was built from the milk of a magic cow out of Lough Neagh. and forms the only remaining part of an early monastery on the site.

At around 18.5 feet (5.6 m), Ardboe High Cross is Northern Ireland's tallest cross. Although the head of the cross is damaged, it seems to be the only such cross in Northern Ireland to remain largely complete and original.

== History of the cross ==
Around 590 AD, St Colman founded an abbey or monastery at Ardboe, on an elevated site overlooking Lough Neagh.

== Description and identification ==
This cross is about 18.5 feet (5.6 m) high and 3.5 feet (1.1 m) wide. It depicts twenty two panels of Old and New Testament scenes.

The east face of the cross depicts the Old Testament scenes in particular which deals with Adam and Eve, the Sacrifice of Isaac, Daniel in the lions' den and the Three Hebrews in the Fiery Furnace. Two scenes are from the Genesis. The east face of the head of the cross depicts scenes: Christ's Second Coming and the Last Judgement.

The south side represents Cain murdering Abel, David (or Samson) and the lion, the fight of David and Goliath and the Desert Saints Paul and Anthony, fed by the raven.

The north side portrays the early life of Christ, including in his baptism at the bottom. The west face describes the Adoration of the Magi, the Miracle at Cana, the Multiplication of the Loaves and Fishes and Christ's entry into Jerusalem. The west face of the head of the cross is carved with scenes from the Passion of Christ and the Crucifixion.
