= Lough Neagh Rescue =

Search and rescue service in Northern Ireland

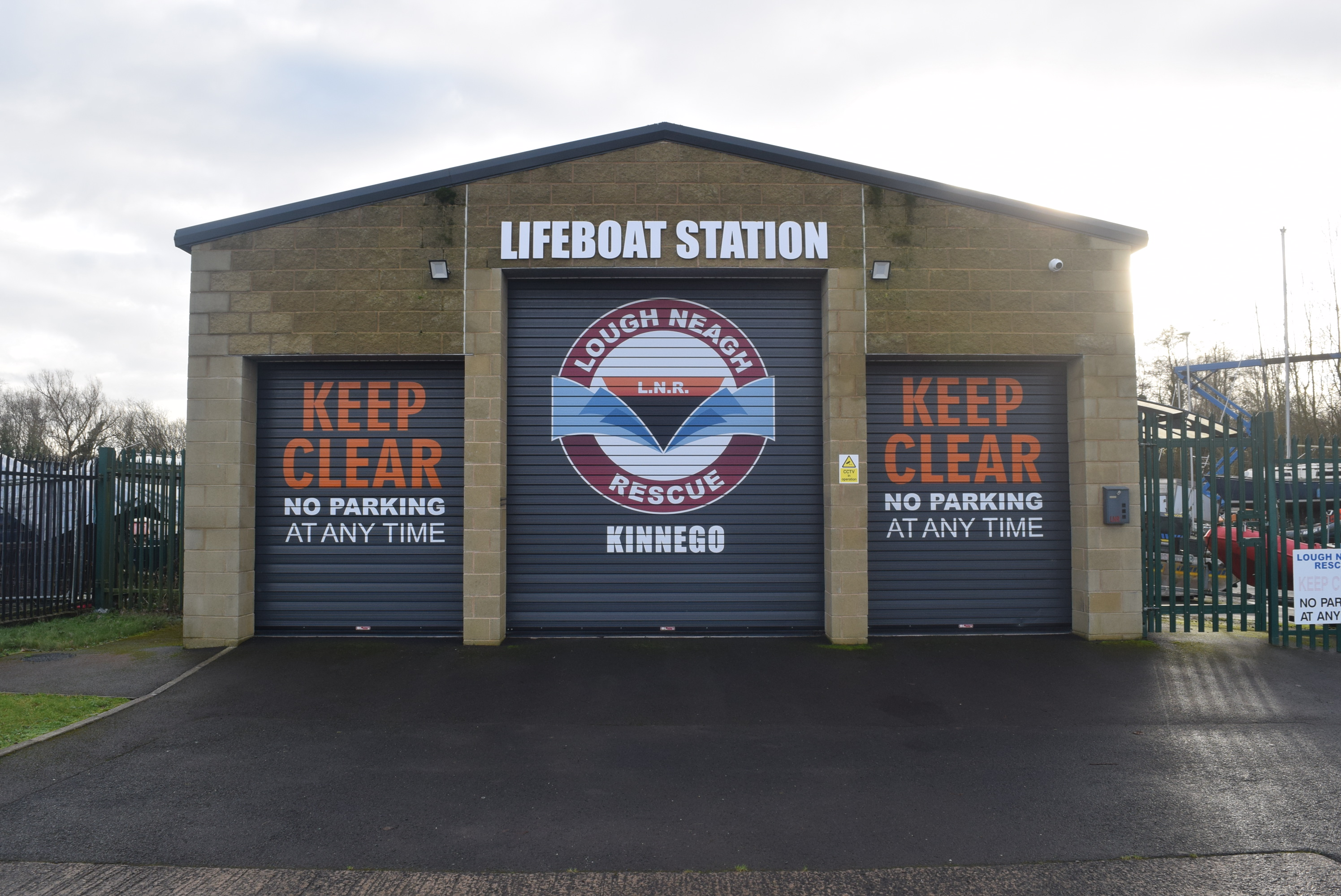
- Kinnego Marina Lifeboat Station, County Armagh

- Location within Northern Ireland

General information
- Type: Lifeboat Station
- Location: Kinnego Bay, Lurgan, County Armagh, Northern Ireland, BT66 6NJ, United Kingdom
- Coordinates: 54°29′21.6″N 6°21′48.9″W
- Opened: 21 October 1989

Website
- Lough Neagh Rescue

Lough Neagh Rescue (LNR) comprises three stations on Lough Neagh in Northern Ireland, at Kinnego, County Armagh, Ardboe, County Tyrone, and at Six Mile Water, County Antrim.

This independent search and rescue (SAR) service was established on 21 October 1989, with the first call-out on 9 February 1990.

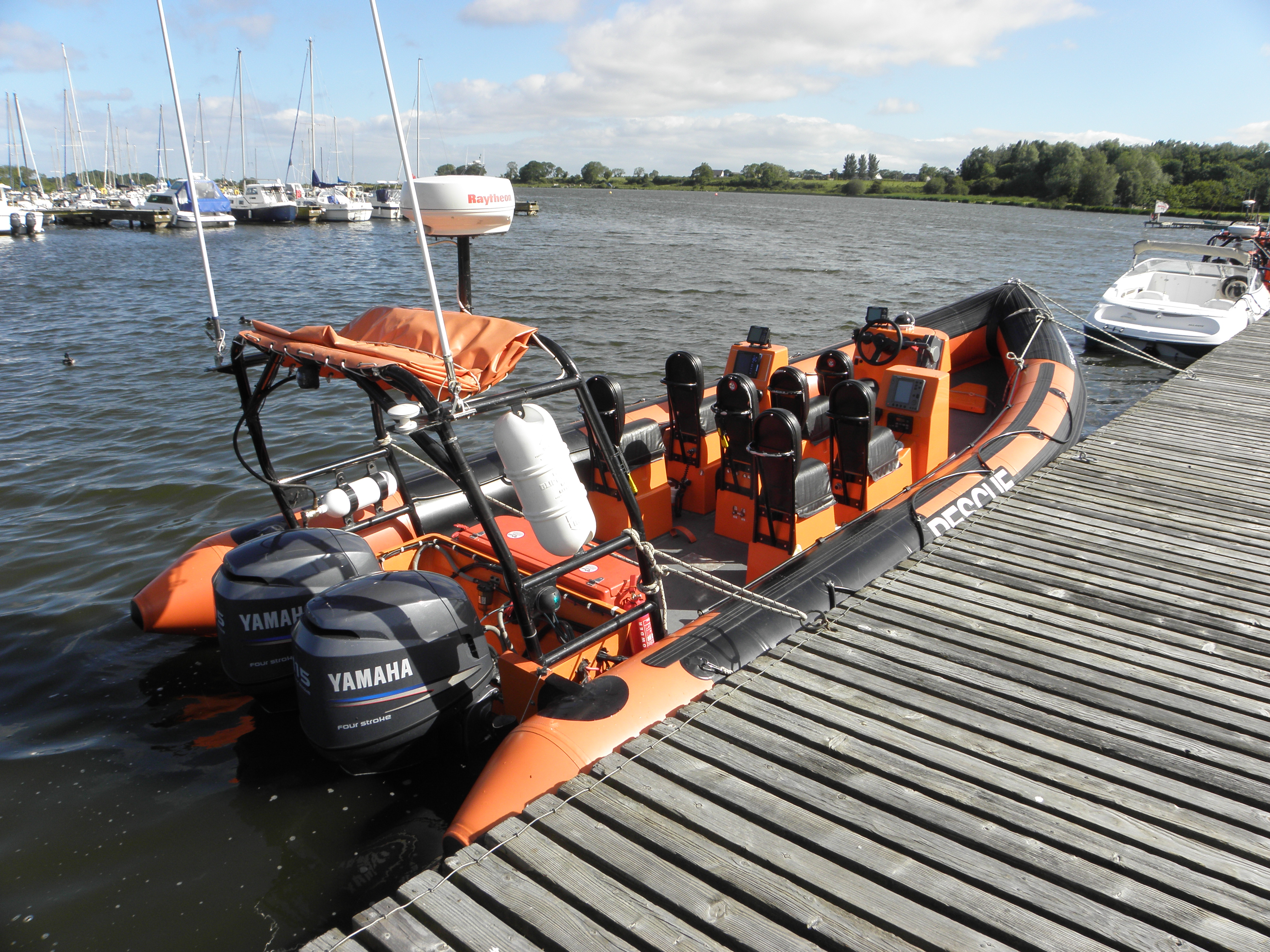
Lough Neagh rescue boat in 2010

Lough Neagh Rescue is a registered charity (No. 101051), and has 'Declared Facility' status with H.M. Coastguard.

== History ==
Lough Neagh is approximately 19 mi (31 km) long by 9 mi (14 km) wide, and by surface area of 148 mi^{2} (380 km^{2}), is the largest lake in the British Isles. According to the Northern Ireland Water in 2023, Lough Neagh supplies 40.7% of all drinking water in Northern Ireland. It is bordered by five of the six counties of Northern Ireland, Antrim, Down, Armagh, Tyrone, and Londonderry. The open expanse of water has seen winds of gale-force eight, and can get very rough, with waves of up to 9 ft (2.7 m).

On 3 July 1989, David Gray Jnr., his fiancée, and two friends were heading home from Ballyronan marina, when their speedboat sank. After five hours in the water, three were picked up by a local boat, but David Gray Jnr. had drowned. Questions were asked as to why there was no lifeboat, and the man's father, David Gray Snr. embarked on a mission to make this a reality.

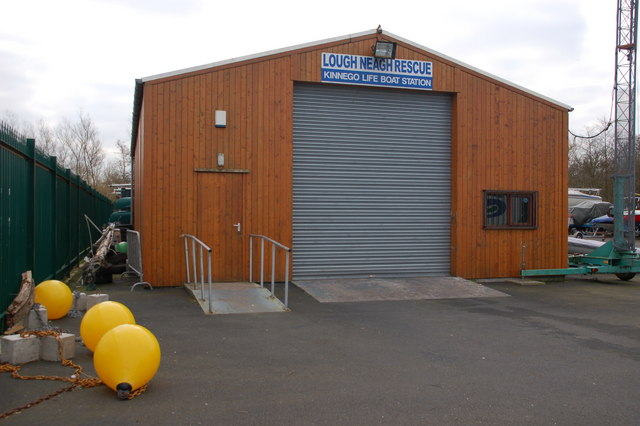
2002 Kinnego Boathouse

Using his own savings, a donation from Craigavaon Borough Council, and a fundraising campaign, Gray Snr. raised £20,000, and Lough Neagh Rescue was established on 21 October 1989, when a lifeboat, Bungy, named in memory of his son, was placed at Kinnego, County Armagh.

A vital step forward for rescue on the Lough occurred in May 1990, when HM Coastguard erected an aerial on Black Mountain for VHF radio communication, which provided coverage to the Lough.

Further fundraising took place, and with a grant of £60,000 from the Northern Ireland Office, a second lifeboat was purchased, and stationed at Battery Harbour near Ardboe, County Tyrone on 29 June 1991. The lifeboat was named David Gray.

Even with these two resources, tragedy can still occur, and on 24 May 1992, Gary Breen (24) drowned, after trying to swim ashore from a broken down boat. Family and friends raised sufficient funds to provide a third boat, again placed at Kinnego.

On 5 May 1997, Bungy II replaced Bungy. Latterly she had been renamed The Gary Breen, but was more commonly known as 'Support 1'.

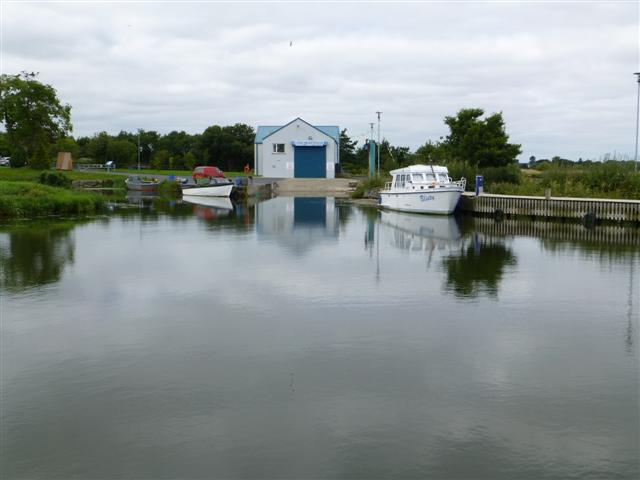
Lough Neagh Rescue, Ardboe

In 2001, a boathouse was constructed at Battery Harbour for the Ardboe lifeboat, formally opening on 5 September 2001, and coinciding with the launch of the replacement Ardboe boat David Gray II.

A station building was also constructed at Kinnego, with the formal opening on 13 April 2002 also seeing the arrival of Gary Breen II.

Bungy II was replaced by Bungy III in 2008, at a cost of €150,000 (£120,000). A grant of 75% was received from EU funding, via the Northern Ireland Department of Agriculture and Rural Development (DARD).

Following an exercise in April 2012 involving crew from both Kinnego and Ardboe stations, and a detailed inspection of equipment and station procedures by an MCA surveyor, Lough Neagh Rescue was the first of 21 Independent UK Lifeboat Stations to be validated as a 'Declared Facility' of the coastguard on 17 May 2012.

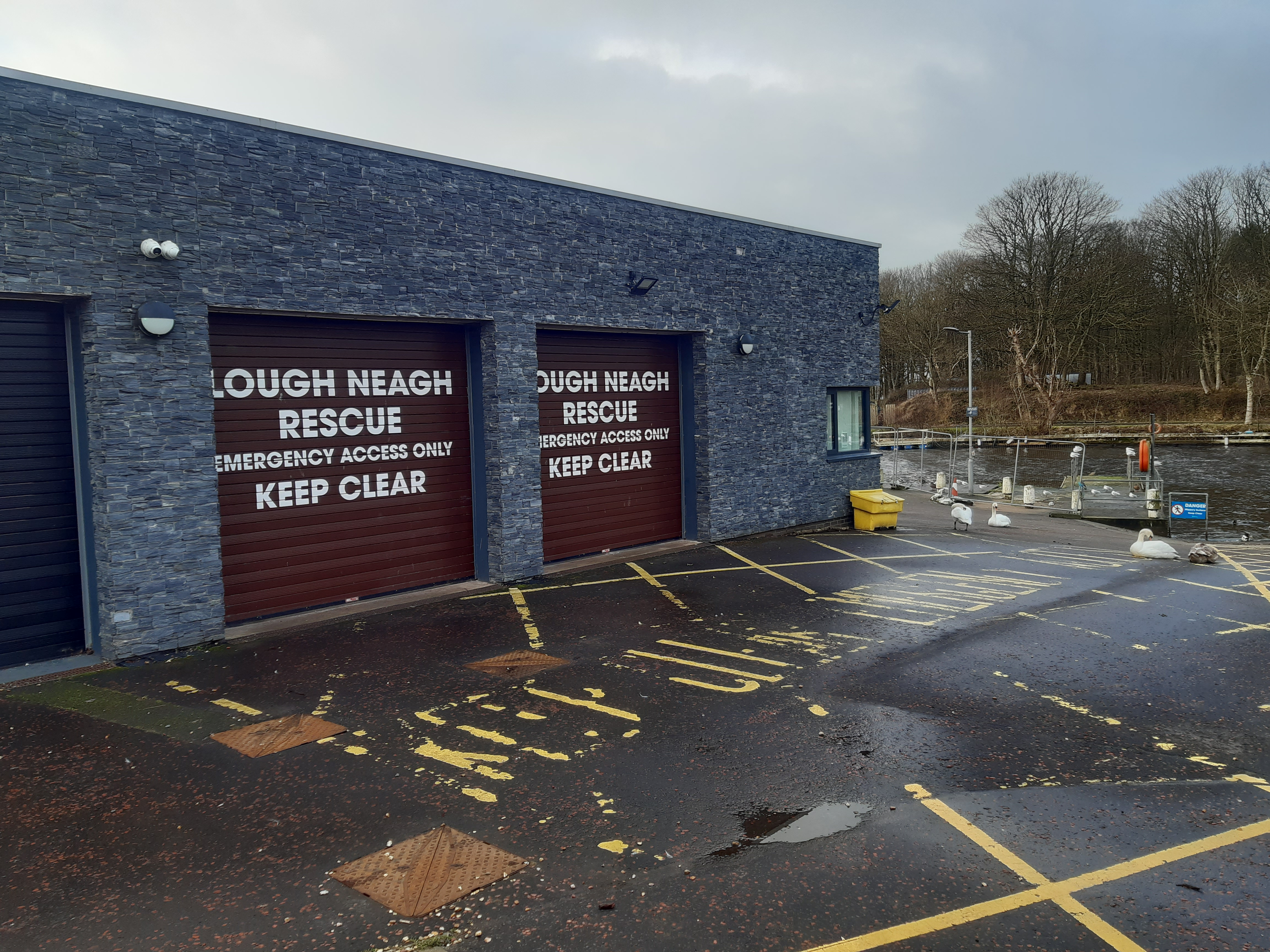
Lough Neagh Rescue facility at Antrim

On 14 December 2013, David Gray Snr. would see the realisation of his vision, with the opening of a third station on Lough Neagh, completing a 'triangle' of lifeboat coverage. The new station was constructed at the end of Six Mile Water in County Antrim, where it flows into Lough Neagh. The station was supported by 'GROW South Antrim', which provided £123,000 of funding through the EU Northern Ireland Rural Development Programme, administered by DARD, and by Antrim Borough Council, who provided the site at a peppercorn rent, and financial assistance of £12,000 per year for three years.

A new Redbay Stormforce 4 m (13 ft) RIB for the Antrim base was launched on 30 August 2014, and named Martin Kidd, in memory of a former LNR crewman who died suddenly two years earlier.

Lifeboat Gary Breen was re-launched on 24 September 2022, after an £85,000 refit. The day also marked the opening of a brand new station at Kinnego, costing £340,000, which had been partially funded by the Department of Agriculture, Environment and Rural Affairs (DAERA).

Two new 9 m (30 ft) Delta RIBs would come into service on 29 April 2023. The lifeboats, one each for the stations at Kinnego and Ardboe, have a life expectancy of 25 years, and were specifically designed following discussions with manufacturer Delta, and advice from crew at the RNLI station at Tower on the River Thames, who also operate Delta craft. Each boat is powered by twin Mercury 300hp Verado outboard engines. Shock absorbing seats are installed to minimise the impact of rough weather conditions, and are designed to allow a stretcher to be locked across them. A casualty hoist has been fitted to the A-frame.

== Station honours ==
The following are awards made at Lough Neagh.

- British Empire Medal

William (Billy) Theodore Cecil Mullen, for services to Lough Neagh Rescue – 2016NYH.

Patrick Joseph Prunty, for services to Lough Neagh Rescue – 2018NYH.

== Lough Neagh lifeboats ==
=== Kinnego ===
54°29′21.6″N 6°21′48.9″W

| Name | On Station | Class | Comments |
|---|---|---|---|
| Bungy | 1989–1997 | | |
| Gary Breen | 1993–2002 | | |
| Bungy II | 1997–2008 | | |
| Gary Breen II | 2002–2022 | | Withdrawn for complete refit, and returned as Gary Breen III |
| Bungy III | 2008–2023 | | £120,000 |
| Gary Breen III | 2022– | | |
| Bungy IV | 2023– | 9m Delta RIB | MMSI 235060191 |

=== Battery Harbour, Ardboe ===
54°37′58.8″N 6°30′20.4″W

| Name | On Station | Class | Comments |
|---|---|---|---|
| David Gray | 1991–2001 | | |
| David Gray II | 2001–2009 | | |
| David Gray III | 2009–2023 | | |
| David Gray IV | 2023– | 9m Delta RIB | MMSI 235084226 |

=== Six Mile Water, Antrim ===
54°43′00.7″N 6°14′18.6″W

| Name | On Station | Class | Comments |
|---|---|---|---|
| Martin Kidd | 2014– | Redbay Stormforce 4m RIB | £123,000 |

== See also ==
- Independent lifeboats in Britain and Ireland
