= Kyle Coney =

Irish Gaelic football player

Personal information
- Born: 1990 (age 35–36) Ardboe, County Tyrone, Northern Ireland
- Occupation: Student

Sport
- Sport: Gaelic football
- Position: Center Forward
Club
- Years: Club
- Ardboe O'Donovan Rossa
Inter-county
- Years: County
- 2009–: Tyrone
Inter-county titles
- Ulster titles: 2
- All-Irelands: 0
- NFL: 0
- All Stars: 0

Kyle Coney (born 1990) is a Gaelic footballer for the Ardboe O'Donovan Rossa club and the Tyrone county team. He won an All-Ireland Minor Football Championship medal with Tyrone in 2008, also winning Ulster Minor Championships with the county in 2007 and 2008. Coney won the Tyrone Minor Championship with his club in 2008. He attended a sports and English specialist school called Holy Trinity College in Cookstown.

In July 2008 he signed a two-year rookie contract with Australian rules team Sydney Swans. He did not leave for Australia until the completion of the All-Ireland Minor Championship and the Tyrone Minor and Senior Championships. He began a two-year rookie contract the Swans in November 2008. Coney returned home as planned in December for Christmas and to play for Ardboe Minors in the Ulster Minor Club Championship, where they were beaten by Ballinderry at the quarter-final stage. Coney was due to return to Australia in January 2009, but decided to remain in Ireland and chose Gaelic football over Australian Rules.
