= RAF Cluntoe =

Former RAF station in County Tyrone

RAF Cluntoe USAAF Station 238
- Ardboe, County Tyrone in Northern Ireland

Site information
- Type: Satellite Station
- Owner: Air Ministry
- Operator: Royal Air Force; United States Army Air Forces

Location
- Shown within Northern Ireland RAF Cluntoe (the United Kingdom)
- Coordinates: 54°37′19″N 006°32′07″W

Site history
- Built: 1940-42
- In use: 1942-1959
- Battles/wars: European theatre of World War II

Airfield information
- Elevation: 25 metres (82 ft) AMSL
Runways
Direction	Length and surface
00/00	Concrete
00/00	Concrete
00/00	Concrete

Royal Air Force Cluntoe or more simply RAF Cluntoe is a former Royal Air Force satellite airfield located 1 mile (1.6 km) west of Ardboe, County Tyrone, Northern Ireland and 8.4 miles (13.5 km) east of Cookstown, County Tyrone.

== History ==
Construction of Cluntoe was started during December 1940, however it was not completed until July 1942. Cluntoe was planned for a RAF Operational Training Unit but when it was opened, it was only used as an emergency landing ground. This changed on 30 August 1943, when the airfield was transferred to United States Army Air Forces (USAAF) and was called "USAAF Station 238".

No. 4 Combat Crew Replacement Center was opened during November 1943 which trained Boeing B-17 Flying Fortress crews with Consolidated B-24 Liberators being added during February 1944. During March 1944 it was designated No. 2 CCRC and was closed during November 1944.

Afterwards it was transferred back to the RAF, but was closed during June 1945. Although the airfield was refurbished and reopened during February 1953 to be used by No. 2 Flying Training School RAF, this only stayed until June 1954, whereupon the unit moved to RAF Hullavington. The airfield was finally closed in 1955.

A soccer team of the same name competed in the Mid Ulster League during the 1953/54 season.

== Current use ==
The site is now called Ardboe Business Park.
