= Frank McGuigan =

Northern Irish Gaelic footballer (1955–2026)

- McGuigan in the 2020s

Personal information
- Native name: Proinsias Mag Uiginn (Irish)
- Nickname: 'King' Frank
- Born: 20 November 1955 Ardboe, County Tyrone, Northern Ireland
- Died: 24 May 2026 (aged 70) Ardboe
- Occupation: Builder

Sport
- Sport: Gaelic football
- Position: Full forward
Club
- Years: Club
- 1970–1977, 1983–1984: Ardboe
Club titles
- Tyrone titles: 4
Inter-county
- Years: County
- 1972–1977, 1983–1984: Tyrone
Inter-county titles
- Ulster titles: 2
- All-Irelands: 0
- NFL: 0
- All Stars: 1

Francis McGuigan (20 November 1955 – 24 May 2026) was an Irish Gaelic footballer who played for the Ardboe GAA club and the Tyrone county team, with whom he won two Ulster Senior Championship titles. Despite his playing career being cut short by a car crash, in which he broke a leg, McGuigan is considered one of the best players to have come from Ulster and was a legend of the 1980s. McGuigan was known for his scoring ability, primarily from open play. In the Ulster final of 1984 he scored a remarkable 0–11 from play in Tyrone's victory over Armagh, often known as "The Frank McGuigan Final". McGuigan earned an All Star for the 1984 season and a Railway Cup medal with Ulster. All four of his sons represented Tyrone. McGuigan's fellow player and Tyrone manager Mickey Harte called him the best Gaelic footballer he had ever seen.

== Club ==
McGuigan, who began as a goalkeeper, won a league medal with Ardboe in 1970. He won the Tyrone championship three years in a row with Ardboe from 1971 to 1973, then again in 1984.

== County underage level ==
In 1971, McGuigan was part of the Tyrone minor (under 18) team that defeated Fermanagh in the Ulster minor final. The next year McGuigan captained the minor team to another Ulster final victory and eventually to the All-Ireland final. He also won an Ulster U-21 Championship medal.

== Senior career ==
McGuigan came on as a substitute for the Senior team in the 1972 Ulster final, which Tyrone lost to Donegal; he was captain the following year, at the age of just nineteen, when Tyrone won the Ulster Championship for the first time since 1957.

In 1977, McGuigan went to America as a representative of a touring Irish team and decided to settle there, putting his playing career on temporary hiatus. He says he lost his best footballing years (aged 22 to 30) to America. McGuigan returned from America in 1983 and played in the Ulster final of 1984. Against rivals Armagh, McGuigan scored eleven of Tyrone's points from open play (not five from either foot and one fisted – as is often reported – but eight from the left foot, two from the right and one fisted) in what is often called "The Frank McGuigan Final". This achievement was voted as one of the Top 20 GAA Moments of the previous forty years. He topped the championship scoring list with a total of 0-19. In a career total of 69 appearance for Tyrone, 18 in the Ulster Championship, McGuigan scored 7–137.

He also won a Railway Cup medal with Ulster in 1984.

On 3 November 1984 McGuigan was involved in a bad car crash that ended his playing career and from which he was lucky to survive, being drunk behind the wheel at the time. He received his All Star Award in February 1985 on crutches. He later rejected the All Star, due to his low esteem held for the accolade. McGuigan felt his own award was cheapened by accusations that it was a "sympathy vote": after his son, Brian was overlooked in the 2005 honours, McGuigan's opinion was strengthened.

Had McGuigan been available when Tyrone reached the All-Ireland final for the first time, in 1986 against Kerry, his fluent scoring ability would have been a major advantage.

McGuigan was named on the GAA team of the 1980s, composed of players who did not win an All-Ireland medal. Long-time Donegal manager and mentor Brian McEniff felt McGuigan was "one of the best players that I have ever seen". Mickey Harte, who played with McGuigan in the Ulster Minor-winning team of 1972, said that the "effortless" McGuigan was undoubtedly one of the best players never to lift an All-Ireland Senior medal. "I don't think I've ever seen a footballer with as much natural talent as Frank McGuigan and I've seen a lot of players playing football - he was the best I've ever seen. He could do everything: field ball with anybody, pass the ball, vision, power and was deceptively fast", added Harte.

== Management ==
McGuigan entered his local club's management team c. 2000.

== Personal life and death ==
McGuigan's parents were Thomas, a fisherman, and Annie and he was one of 12 children; he was married to Geraldine, whom he met in New York in 1977, and was the father of Frank Jnr, Brian, Thomas, Kristin, Caitlin and Shay. In 2024, he spoke of the effect of alcohol abuse on his family life and on his Gaelic football.

All four of McGuigan's sons played for Tyrone and lifted five All-Ireland medals between them at various grades, with Brian earning three Senior All-Ireland medals and an All Star Award. McGuigan attended Rainey Endowed School and was a good rugby player. He was a builder by trade and a keen golfer. McGuigan suffered a heart attack in 2025; he died on 24 May 2026, at the age of 70, and was buried on 28 May at a packed Church of the Blessed Sacrament, Ardboe. Following news of McGuigan’s death, his Tyrone colleagues received messages from former opponents all over Ireland, including Jimmy Barry-Murphy.
