= Monica Farrell =

- Born: 1892; Dublin, Ireland
- Died: 1982 (aged 89–90); Glebe, New South Wales, Australia
- Known for: conversion to Protestantism

Monica Farrell (1892 – 1982) was an Irish Protestant evangelist.

== Early life and family ==
Monica Farrell was born in 1892 in Dublin. She was one of the younger children with 6 siblings. Farrell's mother died when she was 7, so she was raised by her older sister who was a seamstress. In a reaction to poor physical health and her bereavement, Farrell developed a deep Catholic devotion. Two of her sisters became nuns, and two of her brothers became priests. She attended a convent boarding school before transferring to the Central Model School, Marlborough Street, Dublin. She cited this transfer as her motivation to confront her Protestant peers with Catholicism, which ultimately led to her converting to Protestantism. She began to attend Presbyterian services in secret, but when this was discovered by her family she was thrown out of her home.

== Evangelicalism ==
Now homeless, Farrell sought refuge with Church of Ireland church missions. She taught in their schools before moving to England, where she became known for her anti-Catholic street preaching. Among her claims were that Catholicism was a money-making scheme for the clergy. Her speeches would incite physical attacks from Catholics at times, which she recalled in her book Laughing with God (1957). At the invitation of the Builders, an Anglican missionary group, Farrell emigrated to Australia in 1937. Here she founded "Light and truth crusade" in 1947, which was her own independent fundamentalist group. Her 1949 pamphlet Ravening wolves recounted forced conversions to Catholicism and detailed the massacres of orthodox Serbs by the Croatian nationalist Ustasha movement. In this she claimed that "Ustashi is another word for Catholic Action" which was a direct reference to Australian Catholic Action movement sponsored by Archbishop Daniel Mannix.

In 1947, she commenced an international speaking tour dedicated to the issue of the Magdalene laundries. She was inspired to do this after meeting a woman who escaped such a laundry in Tempe, New South Wales. She was one of many Protestant critics of these institutions. As part of this tour, Farrell visited Ireland in 1950 and 1951, addressing a number of meetings in Northern Ireland hosted by the National Union of Protestants. At these events she met Ian Paisley, who later said that Farrell was a strong influence on his career. The mainstream Presbyterians distanced themselves from Farrell, while Paisley advocated for the fundamentalist secession from the Irish Presbyterian church.

During her time in Ireland, she reconnected with her family, and she later claimed to have successfully converted some of her siblings though the veracity of this claim has been questioned. Her 1951 autobiographical pamphlet From Rome to Christ was published 6 times. Other pamphlets included A ready answer: the evils of mixed marriages and Why am I a protestant, daddy?

Over the course of her career, Farrell addressed thousands of groups across the world, while operating her ministry from her home in Glebe, New South Wales. She died in 1982.
