= Carnan (townland) =

Townland in County Tyrone, Northern Ireland

Coordinates: 57°22′N 7°21′W

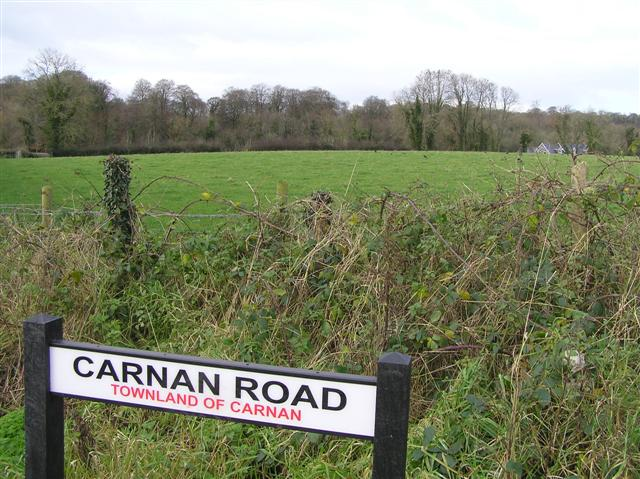
Carnan townland in 2006

Carnan is a townland in County Tyrone, Northern Ireland. It is situated in the historic barony of Dungannon Upper and the civil parish of Arboe and covers an area of 465 acres.

The name derives from the Irish: An Carn n (the little cairn/pile of rocks).

The population of the townland declined during the 19th century:

Year	1841	1851	1861	1871	1881	1891
Population	418	315	262	232	202	171
Houses	89	63	58	49	49	44

== See also ==
- List of townlands of County Tyrone
