= Brian McGuigan =

Irish Gaelic footballer

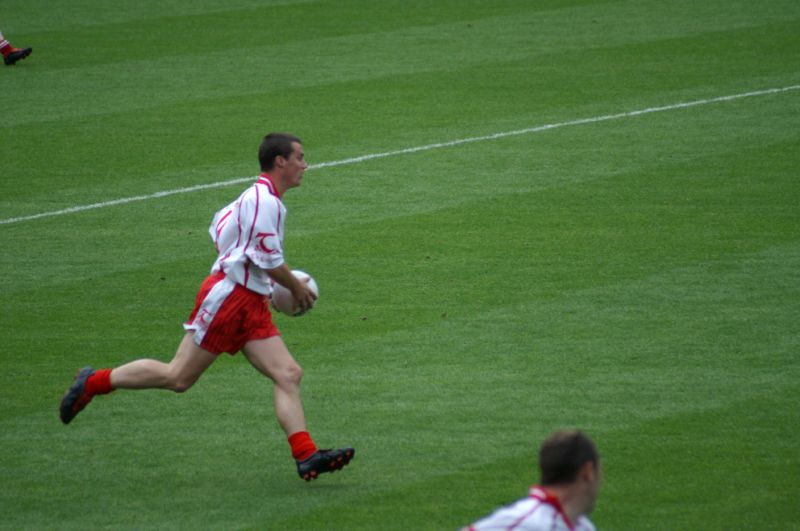
- Brian McGuigan in August 2005

Personal information
- Native name: Brian Mag Uiginn (Irish)
- Nicknames: Horse, 'Young' McGuigan, Snout
- Born: 3 January 1980 (age 46) County Tyrone, Northern Ireland
- Occupation: Joiner
- Height: 1.78 m (5 ft 10 in)

Sport
- Sport: Gaelic football
- Position: Centre forward
Club
- Years: Club
- Ardboe O'Donnovan Rossa
Club titles
- Tyrone titles: 1
Inter-county
- Years: County
- 2001–2011, 2012–: Tyrone
Inter-county titles
- Ulster titles: 4
- All-Irelands: 3
- NFL: 2
- All Stars: 1

Brian McGuigan (born 3 January 1980) is a former Irish Gaelic footballer who played for the Ardboe O'Donovan Rossa club and the Tyrone county team. He won an All Star Award and three All-Ireland medals in 2003 (when he won his All Star) 2005, and 2008.

== Early life and family ==
McGuigan's father Frank also played for Tyrone.

== Playing career ==
At underage level, McGuigan was part of the team that captured All-Ireland gold in 1998 in the Minor championship, and back-to-back triumphs in the Under 21 championships in 2000 and 2001.

McGuigan's influence on the team may be illustrated by Tyrone's mammoth run to the 2005 All-Ireland triumph. During the early stages of the season, they were having difficulty beating teams in the Ulster Championship. McGuigan had been absent from the team because he wanted to take a year out to travel. While he was away he was contacted by the Tyrone staff to return to the Tyrone team, so he cut his holiday short to return to action, and despite being less than match fit he came on as a substitute in his first game back. He was subsequently chosen as a starter for the rest of the Championship, which coincided with Tyrone's return to form with the return of their main playmaker.

He was denied an All Star that year, which caused a lot of controversy, even prompting his father, Frank, to put his own medal up for sale, due to his lowered opinion of the accolade.

== Long term injury ==
Shortly before the 2006 season, McGuigan suffered a horrific double leg break in a club match against Dromore. He was out of action for nearly a year, but has now made an appearance in a club game, and had set a target of 31 March as his comeback game for Tyrone.

However, complications arose two weeks before his scheduled comeback, and he had to undergo keyhole surgery. The treatment meant he missed a lot of time from his job as a joiner, and because Gaelic Games are amateur sports, he was losing income and was given no financial compensation from the GAA. Across Ireland, help has been provided for a locally set up organisation that is trying to assist him through the difficult period. This is a testament to his popularity even among his rivals, as a player and a person.

His nightmare year was further compounded in May 2007, when in a reserve game for his club, he suffered an eye injury, that required eight stitches. It has been confirmed that he should not be included in the Tyrone panel for their Ulster Championship campaign. While there were fears that the eye injury may lead to serious long-term damage to his eyesight, McGuigan has reportedly been making good progress as of September 2007, and made a substitution comeback during the 2008 National League against Laois.

McGuigan went on to regain his place as a regular starter on the Tyrone team in the summer of 2008 as the team won its third All-Ireland title. McGuigan was named on the team for the final against Kerry but dropped to the bench before the throw it with Martin Penrose starting at centre half forward. McGuigan was however introduced for the closing 20 minutes and had a strong influence in Tyrone taking control and winning the match.

His younger brother Tommy also played in the match and scored 1–1.

McGuigan called time on his inter-county career in November 2011, but decided to return to the fold in May 2012 following a number of injuries to key players in the Tyrone setup.

== Style of play ==
McGuigan's playing style is that of the creative playmaker - picking out passes to his full forwards, as well as taking his own scores, usually at vital junctures of a game. The main key to his play that sets him apart from his contemporaries is his ability to control the pace, and direction of a match, through leading by example. Peter Canavan, whose influence since his retirement has been missed, has expressed he feels McGuigan's leadership is the key to any Tyrone success, and have struggled to take control of matches in his long absence.
