= Ardboe O'Donovan Rossa GAC =

Tyrone-based Gaelic games club

Ardboe O'Donovan Rossa
- Ard Bó Uí Dhonnabhain Rosa
- Founded: 1947
- County: Tyrone
- Nickname: The Rossa's
- Colours: Orange and Blue
- Grounds: Michael Coney Park
- Coordinates: 54°36′50.21″N 6°33′06.75″W

Playing kits
Standard	Reserve

Senior Club Championships
	All Ireland	Ulster champions	Tyrone champions
Football:	0	0	7

Ardboe O'Donovan Rossa GAC (Irish: CLG Ard Bó Uí Dhonnabhain Rosa) is a club based in east County Tyrone, Northern Ireland, close to the shores of Lough Neagh. The club was formed in 1947 but Gaelic games had existed under different banners from the early 20th century.

The club has won a total of seven Tyrone Senior Football Championships, the last in 1998 when they defeated Omagh.

== Michael Coney Park ==
Michael Coney Park is the home ground of Ardboe O'Donovan Rossa GAC, situated on the Kilmascally road near to the main parish centre.

In the 1970s the club constructed the main pavilion building and the surrounding facilities. In the following years new fencing was erected and a new covered stand and terracing to further improve the club's grounds.

In recent years the club purchased a new training field near the current playing field. Both pitches became Prunty pitches and floodlights were installed, permitting training during the winter months.

== Achievements ==
- Tyrone Senior Football Championship: (7)
  - 1968, 1971, 1972, 1973, 1984, 1987, 1998
- Tyrone Intermediate Football Championship: (1)
  - 1990
- Tyrone Junior Football Championship: (2)
  - 1962, 1971

== Notable players ==
- Brian McGuigan
- Kyle Coney
- Frank McGuigan
- Fay Devlin
- Tommy McGuigan
- Naoise Quinn

== Book references ==
- Devlin, M. (1990) Ardboe O Donnovan Rossa: A History of GAA in Ardboe
