= Paddy Duffy (SDLP politician) =

Irish nationalist politician

Patrick Aloysius Duffy (19 July 1933 – 19 August 1995), known as Paddy Duffy, was an Irish nationalist politician.

Born in Stewartstown, County Tyrone, Duffy studied at St Patrick's Academy, Dungannon and then Queen's University Belfast before becoming a solicitor. He became politically active in the Nationalist Party, then in the Unity movement, acting as election agent for Frank McManus, the successful candidate in Fermanagh and South Tyrone at the 1970 general election.

After the election, Duffy was a key founder member of the Social Democratic and Labour Party (SDLP), and served as its first treasurer. He was elected to Cookstown District Council at the 1973 Northern Ireland local elections, and then at the 1973 Northern Ireland Assembly election he won a seat in Mid Ulster, which he successfully defended on the Northern Ireland Constitutional Convention in 1975. He also retained his council seat in 1977 and 1981. However, he proved less successful on the national stage, taking second place in Mid Ulster at the 1979 general election.

In the late 1970s, Duffy became known for his outspoken support of Northern Irish independence, although he did concede that there would need to be some form of federal structure covering the entire island. He objected to the arrangements for the 1982 Northern Ireland Assembly election, refused to stand, and unsuccessfully attempted to persuade the SDLP to boycott the election, and called for its assembly members to withdraw after Seamus Mallon was disqualified. Following this, he withdrew from involvement in the SDLP, although he was re-elected as a nominal party member to Cookstown District Council in 1985 and 1989.

Outside politics, Duffy built up a large legal practice, with offices in small towns across Northern Ireland. He was also active in the credit union and co-operative movements. At the time of his death in 1996, he was a member of the board of the International Fund for Ireland.

Duffy was married to his wife Mary, and they had three sons. He died on 19 August 1995.

Northern Ireland Assembly (1973)
| New assembly | Assembly Member for Mid-Ulster; 1973–1974 | Assembly abolished |
Northern Ireland Constitutional Convention
| New convention | Member for Mid-Ulster; 1975–1976 | Convention dissolved |
