= 2014 Derry City and Strabane District Council election =

Local government election in Northern Ireland

2014 Derry and Strabane District Council election
| 22 May 2014 | 2019 → |

All 40 council seats 21 seats needed for a majority
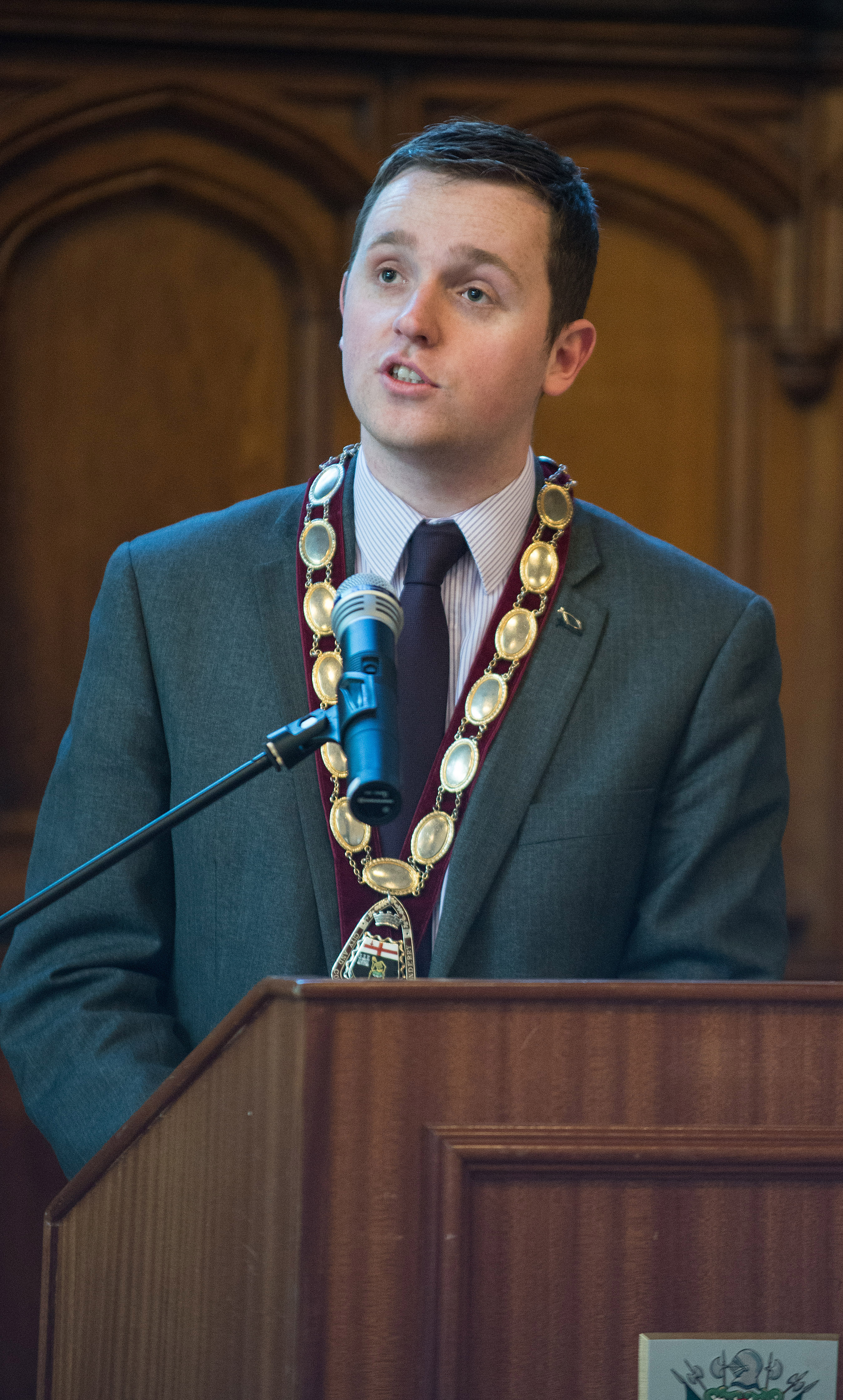
| | First party | Second party | Third party |
|---|---|---|---|
| Leader | Paul Fleming | Gerard Diver | Gary Middleton |
| Party | Sinn Féin | SDLP | DUP |
| Leader's seat | Faughan | Waterside | Faughan |
| Last election | 16 seats, 35.7% | 13 seats, 29.8% | 8 seats, 17.3% |
| Seats won | 16 | 8 | 8 |
| Seat change | 0 | ▼3 | 0 |
| Popular vote | 19,384 | 13,773 | 8,273 |
| Percentage | 36.1% | 25.6% | 15.4% |
| Swing | ▲0.4% | ▼4.2% | ▼2.0% |
| | Fourth party | Fifth party |
| Leader | | Derek Hussey |
| Party | Independent | UUP |
| Leader's seat | | Derg |
| Last election | 1 seat, 4.43% | 2 seats, 6.85% |
| Seats won | 7 | 2 |
| Seat change | ▲3 | 0 |
| Popular vote | 5,677 | 4,065 |
| Percentage | 10.6% | 7.6% |
| Swing | ▲6.1% | ▲0.7% |
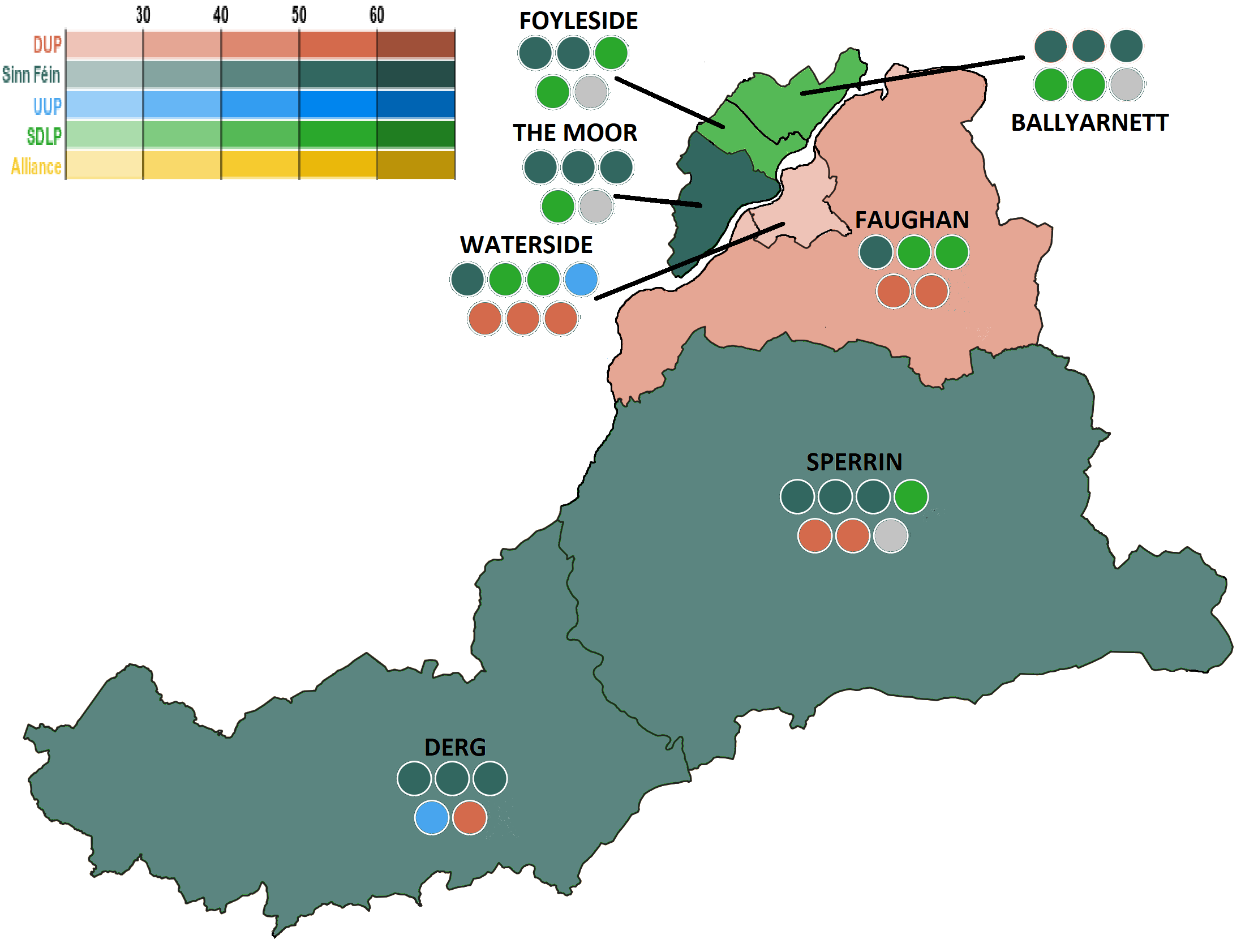
- Derry and Strabane 2014 Council Election Results by DEA (Shaded by plurality of FPVs)
Mayor of Derry before election
Martin Reilly
SDLP
Elected Mayor of Derry
Martin Reilly
SDLP

The first election to the new Derry and Strabane District Council took place on 22 May 2014, as part of the Northern Ireland local elections that year.

== Results by party ==
Because these elections were contested with new electoral boundaries, the results are not directly comparable with those of the last election. However, psephologist Nicholas Whyte has calculated notional results by which to judge the parties' relative performance.^{[8]} The changes in seats and first preference vote share are relative to these notional results.

| Party | Seats | ± | First Pref. votes | FPv% | ±% |
|---|---|---|---|---|---|
| Sinn Féin | 16 | 0 | 19,384 | 36.06% | ▲0.35% |
| SDLP | 10 | ▼3 | 13,773 | 25.63% | ▼4.19% |
| DUP | 8 | 0 | 8,273 | 15.39% | ▼1.95% |
| Independent | 4 | ▲3 | 5,677 | 10.56% | ▲6.13% |
| UUP | 2 | 0 | 4,065 | 7.56% | ▲0.71% |
| Alliance | 0 | 0 | 853 | 1.59% | ▲0.98% |
| TUV | 0 | 0 | 521 | 0.97% | New |
| PUP | 0 | 0 | 274 | 0.51% | ▲0.16% |
| People Before Profit | 0 | 0 | 232 | 0.43% | ▼1.81% |
| UKIP | 0 | 0 | 185 | 0.34% | New |
| Totals | 40 | - | 53,748 | 100.00% | - |

== Districts summary ==
Results of the Derry City and Strabane District Council election, 2014 by district
| Ward | % | Cllrs | % | Cllrs | % | Cllrs | % | Cllrs | % | Cllrs | Total Cllrs |
| Ward | Sinn Féin | | SDLP | | DUP | | UUP | | Others | | Total Cllrs |
|---|---|---|---|---|---|---|---|---|---|---|---|
| Ballyarnett | 42.1 | 3 | 42.6 | 2 | 0.0 | 0 | 0.0 | 0 | 15.3 | 0 | 6 |
| Derg | 42.5 | 3 | 10.9 | 0 | 21.3 | 1 | 18.6 | 1 | 6.7 | 0 | 5 |
| Faughan | 19.8 | 1 | 23.4 | 2 | 31.9 | 2 | 8.8 | 0 | 16.1 | 0 | 5 |
| Foyleside | 36.0 | 2 | 41.4 | 2 | 0.0 | 0 | 0.0 | 0 | 22.6 | 1 | 5 |
| Sperrin | 40.9 | 3 | 15.5 | 1 | 21.3 | 2 | 5.8 | 0 | 16.5 | 1 | 7 |
| The Moor | 51.5 | 3 | 30.0 | 1 | 0.0 | 0 | 0.0 | 0 | 18.5 | 1 | 5 |
| Waterside | 19.4 | 1 | 22.2 | 2 | 28.2 | 3 | 17.1 | 1 | 13.1 | 0 | 7 |
| Total | 36.1 | 16 | 25.6 | 10 | 15.4 | 8 | 7.6 | 2 | 15.3 | 4 | 40 |

== District results ==
=== Ballyarnett ===
2014: 3 x Sinn Féin, 2 x SDLP, 1 x Independent

Ballyarnett - 6 seats
| Party | Candidate | FPv% | Count | | | | |
| Party | Candidate | FPv% | 1 | 2 | 3 | 4 | 5 |
|---|---|---|---|---|---|---|---|
| Sinn Féin | Sandra Duffy | 15.12% | 1,163 | | | | |
| SDLP | Angela Dobbins* | 15.02% | 1,155 | 1,155 | | | |
| Sinn Féin | Tony Hassan* † | 14.20% | 1,092 | 1,101 | 1,101 | | |
| SDLP | Brian Tierney* | 12.52% | 963 | 975 | 976 | 983.9 | 1,423.9 |
| Independent | Dermot Quigley † | 13.49% | 1,037 | 1,069 | 1,070.45 | 1,072.65 | 1,105.65 |
| Sinn Féin | Elisha McCallion* † | 12.81% | 985 | 992 | 1,044.15 | 1,046.45 | 1,062.45 |
| SDLP | Jimmy Carr* | 7.87% | 605 | 621 | 622.35 | 633.05 | 690.05 |
| SDLP | Colm O'Connor | 7.17% | 551 | 586 | 586.7 | 617.15 | |
| Alliance | Danny McCloskey | 1.81% | 139 | | | | |
Electorate: 15,987 Valid: 7,690 (48.10%) Spoilt: 174 Quota: 1,099 Turnout: 7,864 (49.19%)

=== Derg ===
2014: 3 x Sinn Féin, 1 x DUP, 1 x UUP

Derg - 5 seats
| Party | Candidate | FPv% | Count | | | | |
| Party | Candidate | FPv% | 1 | 2 | 3 | 4 | 5 |
|---|---|---|---|---|---|---|---|
| UUP | Derek Hussey* | 18.56% | 1,411 | | | | |
| DUP | Thomas Kerrigan* | 12.15% | 924 | 1,007.1 | 1,020 | 1,313 | |
| Sinn Féin | Maolíosa McHugh* | 13.87% | 1,055 | 1,055.1 | 1,101.1 | 1,101.1 | 1,254.4 |
| Sinn Féin | Kieran McGuire* | 14.10% | 1,072 | 1,072.4 | 1,148.4 | 1,148.6 | 1,237.6 |
| Sinn Féin | Ruairí McHugh* | 14.49% | 1,102 | 1,102.1 | 1,136.1 | 1,138.1 | 1,229.1 |
| DUP | Sharon Smyth | 9.11% | 693 | 713 | 714.1 | 934.7 | 971.7 |
| SDLP | Jim McIntyre | 5.47% | 416 | 417.7 | 630.6 | 642.2 | |
| TUV | Robert Oliver | 6.85% | 521 | 550.8 | 557 | | |
| SDLP | Marie Ash | 5.39% | 410 | 412.7 | | | |
Electorate: 12,526 Valid: 7,604 (60.71%) Spoilt: 111 Quota: 1,268 Turnout: 7,715 (61.59%)

=== Faughan ===
2014: 2 x DUP, 2 x SDLP, 1 x Sinn Féin

Faughan - 5 seats
| Party | Candidate | FPv% | Count | | | | | | | | |
| Party | Candidate | FPv% | 1 | 2 | 3 | 4 | 5 | 6 | 7 | 8 | 9 |
|---|---|---|---|---|---|---|---|---|---|---|---|
| DUP | Gary Middleton*† | 17.05% | 1,077 | | | | | | | | |
| DUP | Maurice Devenney*‡ | 14.81% | 936 | 1,034 | 1,052.72 | 1,090.72 | | | | | |
| Sinn Féin | Paul Fleming* | 14.17% | 895 | 898 | 898.04 | 914.04 | 1,195.04 | | | | |
| SDLP | Jim McKeever | 7.80% | 493 | 496 | 496.14 | 564.14 | 591.16 | 651 | 655 | 914.18 | 985.18 |
| SDLP | Gus Hastings* | 7.79% | 492 | 497 | 497.02 | 542.04 | 561.04 | 602.4 | 605.4 | 796.94 | 952.94 |
| UUP | Ronnie McKeegan | 8.78% | 555 | 605 | 607.16 | 668.2 | 669.2 | 670.08 | 692.08 | 704.1 | 717.1 |
| Independent | Paul Hughes | 7.93% | 501 | 504 | 504 | 541 | 552 | 575.76 | 575.76 | 586.76 | |
| SDLP | Brenda Stevenson* | 7.76% | 490 | 491 | 491.06 | 522.06 | 533.06 | 548.02 | 550.02 | | |
| Sinn Féin | Michael McCrossan | 5.67% | 358 | 358 | 358.02 | 365.02 | | | | | |
| Alliance | David Hawthorne | 5.32% | 336 | 345 | 345.16 | | | | | | |
| UKIP | Geoff Cruickshank | 2.93% | 185 | | | | | | | | |
Electorate: 12,933 Valid: 6,318 (48.85%) Spoilt: 86 Quota: 1,054 Turnout: 6,404 (49.52%)

=== Foyleside ===
2014: 2 x SDLP, 2 x Sinn Féin, 1 x Independent

Foyleside - 5 seats
| Party | Candidate | FPv% | Count | | | | |
| Party | Candidate | FPv% | 1 | 2 | 3 | 4 | 5 |
|---|---|---|---|---|---|---|---|
| SDLP | John Boyle* | 17.78% | 1,132 | | | | |
| Independent | Darren O'Reilly | 17.13% | 1,091 | | | | |
| Sinn Féin | Michael Cooper* | 12.58% | 801 | 843 | 847.74 | 1,154.74 | |
| Sinn Féin | Eric McGinley* | 12.42% | 791 | 817 | 818.68 | 1,124.68 | |
| SDLP | Shauna Cusack* | 11.62% | 740 | 842 | 894.14 | 943.62 | 975.62 |
| SDLP | Rory Farrell | 11.67% | 743 | 804 | 809.4 | 827.52 | 841.52 |
| Sinn Féin | Barney O'Hagan* | 11.01% | 701 | 722 | 723.14 | | |
| People Before Profit | Sha Gillespie | 3.64% | 232 | | | | |
| Alliance | Daniel Comer | 2.15% | 137 | | | | |
Electorate: 12,724 Valid: 6,368 (50.05%) Spoilt: 171 Quota: 1,062 Turnout: 6,539 (51.39%)

=== Sperrin ===
2014: 3 x Sinn Féin, 2 x DUP, 1 x SDLP, 1 x Independent

Sperrin - 7 seats
| Party | Candidate | FPv% | Count | | | | | | | |
| Party | Candidate | FPv% | 1 | 2 | 3 | 4 | 5 | 6 | 7 | 8 |
|---|---|---|---|---|---|---|---|---|---|---|
| DUP | Allan Bresland* | 11.70% | 1,179 | 1,179 | 1,443 | | | | | |
| DUP | Rhonda Hamilton* | 9.57% | 965 | 965 | 1,233 | 1,408 | | | | |
| SDLP | Patsy Kelly*‡ | 8.10% | 816 | 872 | 893 | 894.4 | 923.1 | 1,279.1 | | |
| Sinn Féin | Karina Carlin* | 11.60% | 1,169 | 1,178 | 1,178 | 1,178 | 1,178 | 1,213 | 1,215 | 1,285 |
| Independent | Paul Gallagher | 9.70% | 978 | 997 | 998 | 998 | 1,001.5 | 1,026.9 | 1,028.6 | 1,203.5 |
| Sinn Féin | Brian McMahon* | 9.58% | 966 | 974 | 974 | 974 | 974 | 999 | 1,000.2 | 1,138.2 |
| Sinn Féin | Dan Kelly* | 10.07% | 1,015 | 1,022 | 1,022 | 1,022 | 1,022.7 | 1,048.7 | 1,049.9 | 1,111.5 |
| Sinn Féin | Diarmuid Ward | 9.62% | 970 | 976 | 976 | 976 | 976 | 998.7 | 1,002.1 | 1,023.1 |
| Independent | Eugene McMenamin* | 6.85% | 690 | 699 | 718 | 719.4 | 746.7 | 819.1 | 826.5 | |
| SDLP | Patrick Leonard | 5.55% | 559 | 623 | 626 | 628.8 | 638.6 | | | |
| UUP | William Jamieson | 5.83% | 588 | 589 | | | | | | |
| SDLP | Liam Stewart | 1.84% | 185 | | | | | | | |
Electorate: 17,214 Valid: 10,080 (58.56%) Spoilt: 183 Quota: 1,261 Turnout: 10,263 (59.62%)

=== The Moor ===
2014: 3 x Sinn Féin, 1 x SDLP, 1 x Independent

The Moor - 5 seats
| Party | Candidate | FPv% | Count | | | | | |
| Party | Candidate | FPv% | 1 | 2 | 3 | 4 | 5 | 6 |
|---|---|---|---|---|---|---|---|---|
| Independent | Gary Donnelly | 16.83% | 1,154 | | | | | |
| Sinn Féin | Kevin Campbell* | 16.10% | 1,104 | 1,112 | 1,149 | | | |
| Sinn Féin | Colly Kelly* † | 11.30% | 775 | 780 | 789 | 1,314 | | |
| Sinn Féin | Patricia Logue* | 14.54% | 997 | 1,006 | 1,020 | 1,097 | 1,261.22 | |
| SDLP | Seán Carr* ‡ | 12.27% | 841 | 852 | 1,061 | 1,079 | 1,080.02 | 1,087.5 |
| SDLP | Emmet Doyle | 9.86% | 676 | 689 | 943 | 961 | 962.36 | 968.14 |
| Sinn Féin | Liam Friel | 9.54% | 654 | 664 | 665 | | | |
| SDLP | Dermott Henderson | 7.91% | 542 | 556 | | | | |
| Independent | Patrick Mellon | 1.65% | 113 | | | | | |
Electorate: 12,536 Valid: 6,856 (54.69%) Spoilt: 174 Quota: 1,143 Turnout: 7,096 (56.60%)

=== Waterside ===
2014: 3 x DUP, 2 x SDLP, 1 x Sinn Féin, 1 x UUP

Waterside - 7 seats
| Party | Candidate | FPv% | Count | | | | | | | | | | |
| Party | Candidate | FPv% | 1 | 2 | 3 | 4 | 5 | 6 | 7 | 8 | 9 | 10 | 11 |
|---|---|---|---|---|---|---|---|---|---|---|---|---|---|
| SDLP | Gerard Diver* †† | 12.20% | 1,080 | 1,121 | | | | | | | | | |
| UUP | Mary Hamilton* | 11.82% | 1,046 | 1,047 | 1,058 | 1,079 | 1,166 | | | | | | |
| Sinn Féin | Christopher Jackson | 12.01% | 1,063 | 1,075 | 1,075 | 1,084 | 1,086 | 1,086 | 1,089 | 1,092.42 | 1,092.42 | 1,671.42 | |
| SDLP | Martin Reilly* | 10.00% | 884 | 899 | 900 | 1,014 | 1,020 | 1,020.76 | 1,034.76 | 1,044.45 | 1,046.45 | 1,106.21 | |
| DUP | David Ramsey | 6.25% | 553 | 553 | 561 | 562 | 588 | 591.8 | 662.56 | 662.56 | 1,083.32 | 1,085.32 | 1,088.32 |
| DUP | Hilary McClintock | 9.16% | 811 | 812 | 826 | 837 | 861 | 864.8 | 915.8 | 916.37 | 1,013.89 | 1,015.89 | 1,017.89 |
| DUP | Drew Thompson* | 6.86% | 607 | 607 | 613 | 620 | 642 | 645.04 | 728.8 | 728.8 | 762.32 | 763.32 | 767.32 |
| UUP | Julia Kee | 5.26% | 465 | 466 | 472 | 484 | 508 | 547.52 | 703.28 | 704.42 | 727.18 | 729.18 | 735.18 |
| Sinn Féin | Bridget Meehan | 7.41% | 656 | 662 | 663 | 673 | 674 | 674 | 677 | 677.57 | 679.33 | | |
| DUP | Niree McMorris | 5.96% | 528 | 528 | 530 | 531 | 557 | 563.08 | 594.08 | 594.65 | | | |
| UKIP | Kyle Thompson | 3.25% | 287 | 287 | 450 | 456 | 514 | 517.8 | | | | | |
| PUP | Nigel Gardiner | 3.10% | 274 | 277 | 285 | 288 | | | | | | | |
| Alliance | Asta Kereviciene | 2.73% | 241 | 245 | 246 | | | | | | | | |
| UKIP | David Malcolm | 2.54% | 224 | 225 | | | | | | | | | |
| Independent | Michael Carlin | 1.28% | 113 | | | | | | | | | | |
Electorate: 18,549 Valid: 8,832 (47.61%) Spoilt: 166 Quota: 1,105 Turnout: 8,998 (48.51%)

* Incumbent

== Changes during the term ==
=== † Co-options ===
| Co-option date | District Electoral Area | Party | Outgoing | Co-optee | Reason |
|---|---|---|---|---|---|
| 13 May 2015 | Faughan | DUP | Gary Middleton | Graham Warke | Middleton was co-opted to the Assembly. |
| 1 Sep 2015 | Ballyarnett | Independent | Dermot Quigley | Warren Robinson | Quigley resigned. |
| 21 Jan 2016 | Waterside | SDLP | Gerard Diver | Tina Gardiner | Diver was co-opted to the Assembly. |
| 29 Mar 2017 | Ballyarnett | Sinn Féin | Elisha McCallion | Caoimhe McKnight | McCallion was elected to the UK Parliament. |
| 1 Mar 2018 | Ballyarnett | Sinn Féin | Tony Hassan | Conchúr McCauley | Hassan resigned. |
| 18 Sep 2018 | The Moor | Sinn Féin | Colly Kelly | Sharon Duddy | Colly resigned. |
| 13 Nov 2018 | Ballyarnett | Sinn Féin | Conchúr McCauley | Aileen Mellon | McCauley resigned. |
| 23 Nov 2018 | Waterside | SDLP | Tina Gardiner | Sinead McLaughlin | Gardiner resigned. |

=== ‡ Changes of affiliation ===
| Date | District Electoral Area | Name | Previous affiliation | New affiliation | Circumstance |
|---|---|---|---|---|---|
| 23 Apr 2015 | The Moor | Sean Carr | SDLP | Independent | Resigned. |
| 17 Feb 2016 | Faughan | Maurice Devenney | DUP | Independent | Resigned. |
| 5 Apr 2016 | Sperrin | Patsy Kelly | SDLP | Independent | Resigned. |

Current composition: see Derry and Strabane District Council.
