= 2014 Northern Ireland local elections =

- 22 May 2014

All 462 council seats
- Turnout: 51.3% (▼4.4%)
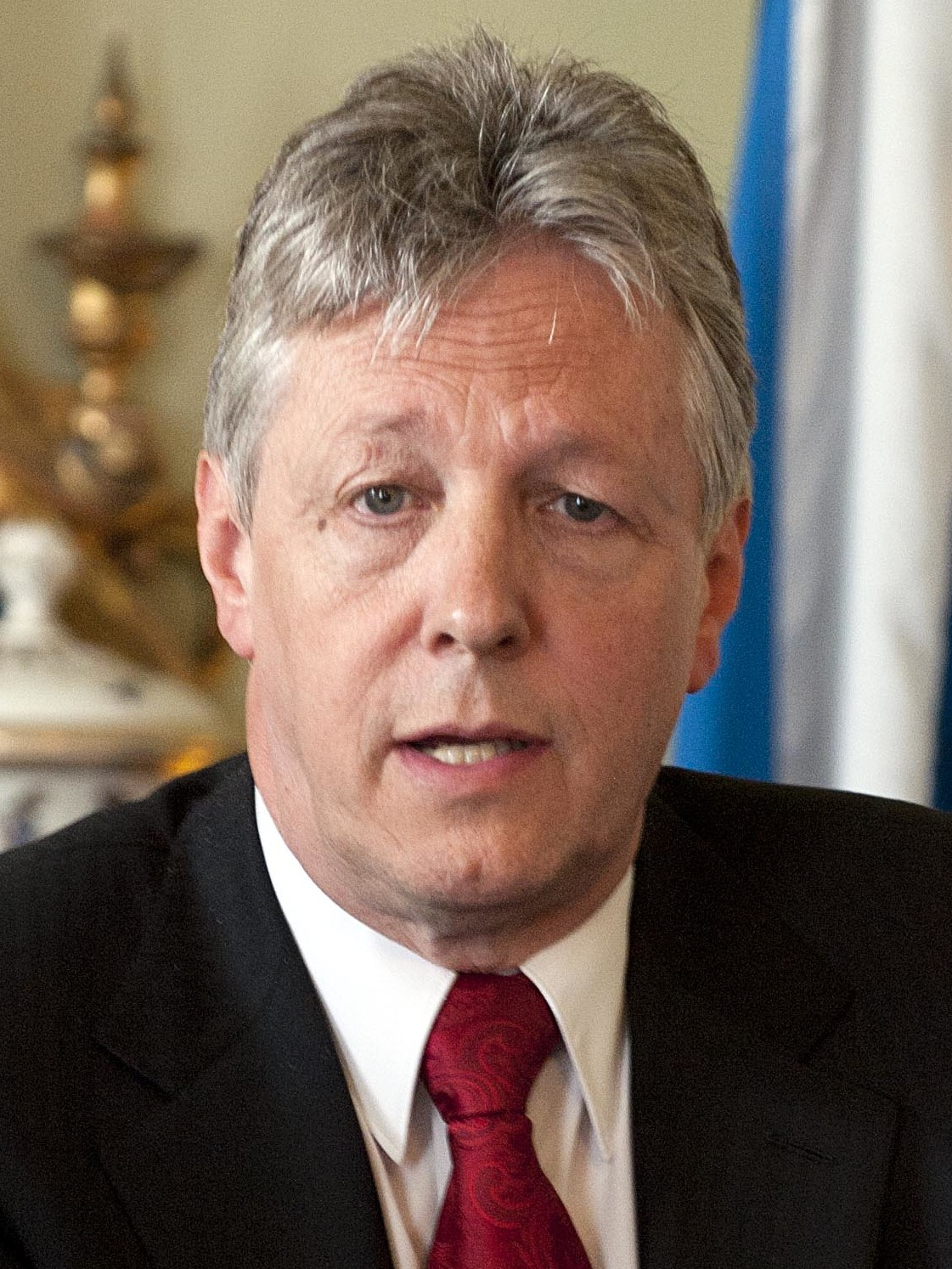

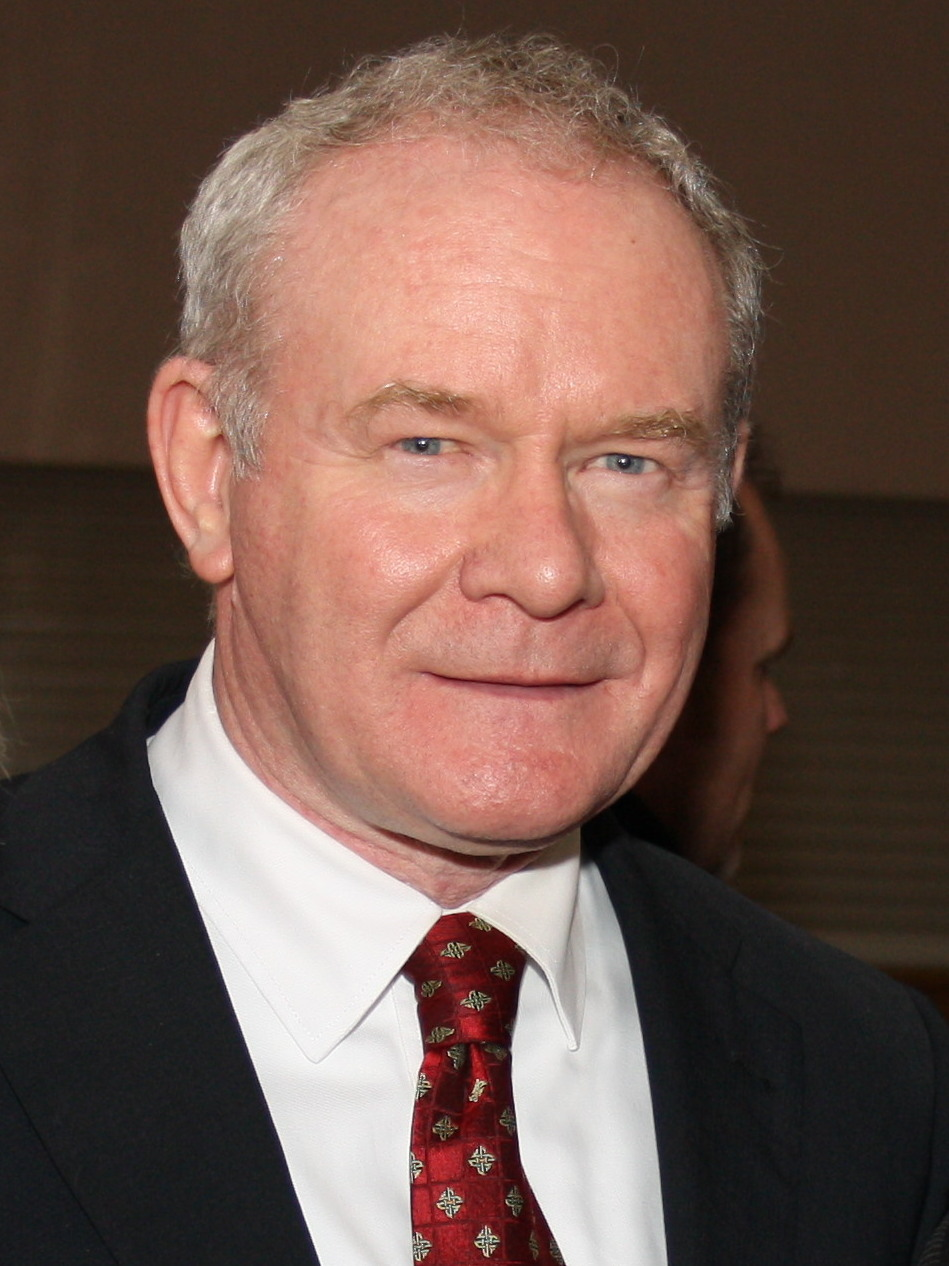

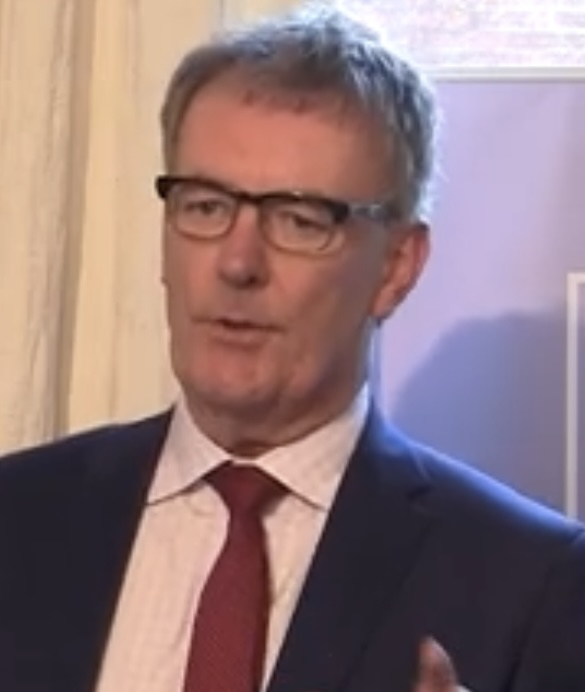

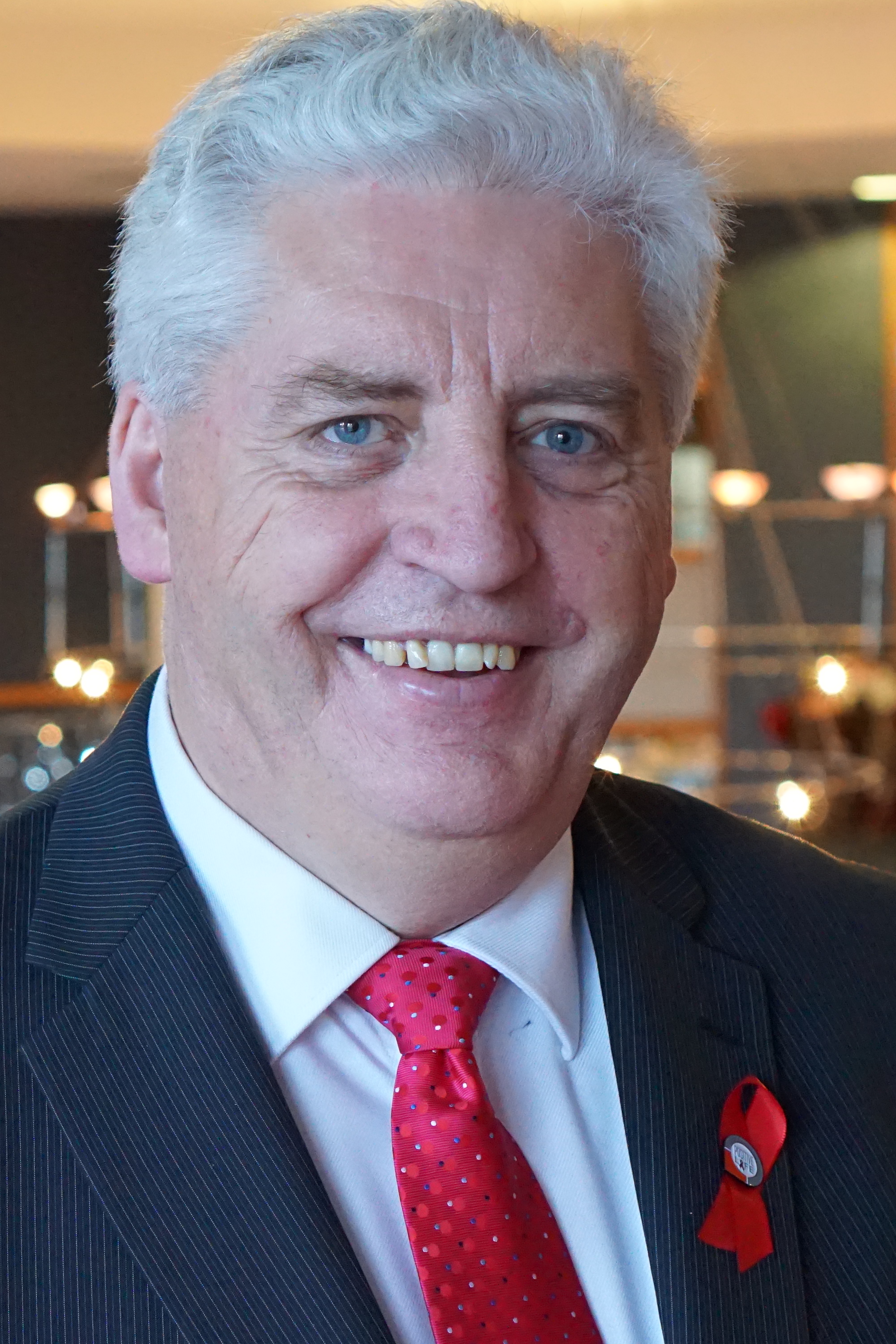

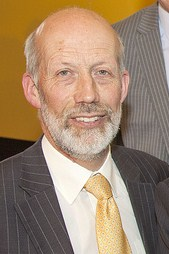

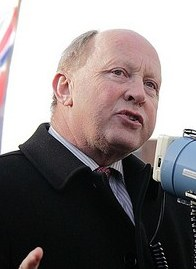
	First party	Second party	Third party
Leader	Peter Robinson	Martin McGuinness	Mike Nesbitt
Party	DUP	Sinn Féin	UUP
Seats won	130	105	88
Seat change	▼15	▼10	▲11
Popular vote	144,928	151,137	101,385
Percentage	23.1%	24.1%	16.1%
Swing	▼4.1%	▼0.7%	▲0.9%
	Fourth party	Fifth party	Sixth party
Leader	Alasdair McDonnell	David Ford	Jim Allister
Party	SDLP	Alliance	TUV
Seats won	66	32	13
Seat change	▼1	▼2	▲10
Popular vote	85,237	41,769	28,310
Percentage	13.6%	6.7%	4.5%
Swing	▼1.4%	▼0.7%	▲2.5%

Local elections were held in Northern Ireland on Thursday 22 May 2014, contesting 462 seats in all, as part of the wider local elections across the United Kingdom. The election took place on the same day as the European Parliament election. 1,243,649 people aged 18 and over were eligible to vote, and 51.3% of the electorate turned out.

== Voter eligibility ==
All voters were required to present one piece of photographic ID in order to cast a vote at the polling station. Accepted forms of ID were an electoral identity card, an EEA photographic driving licence, a European Union member-state passport, a Translink 60+ SmartPass, a Translink Senior SmartPass, a Translink Blind Person's SmartPass or a Translink War Disabled SmartPass. Voters lacking an accepted type of photographic ID had until 9 May 2014 to apply for an electoral identity card from the Electoral Office.

== Background ==
The elections represented a milestone in the reform of local government in Northern Ireland, as councillors were elected to 11 new councils. These operated in shadow form until Wednesday 1 April 2015, with the current 26 councils existing in parallel until then.

The 11 new councils, with links to the official lists of candidates standing ("statements of persons nominated"), are:

1. Belfast City Council (Candidates)
2. North Down and Ards District Council (Candidates)
3. Antrim and Newtownabbey District Council (Candidates)
4. Lisburn and Castlereagh District Council (Candidates)
5. Newry, Mourne and Down District Council (Candidates)
6. Armagh, Banbridge and Craigavon District Council (Candidates)
7. Mid and East Antrim District Council (Candidates)
8. Causeway Coast and Glens District Council (Candidates)
9. Mid-Ulster District Council (Candidates)
10. Derry and Strabane District Council (Candidates)
11. Fermanagh and Omagh District Council (Candidates)

The local government reorganisation and electoral administration was mandated by the Local Government Act (Northern Ireland) 2014. Nominations of election candidates closed on 29 April 2014.

The 2014 election heralds 26 councils being reduced to 11 in April 2015.

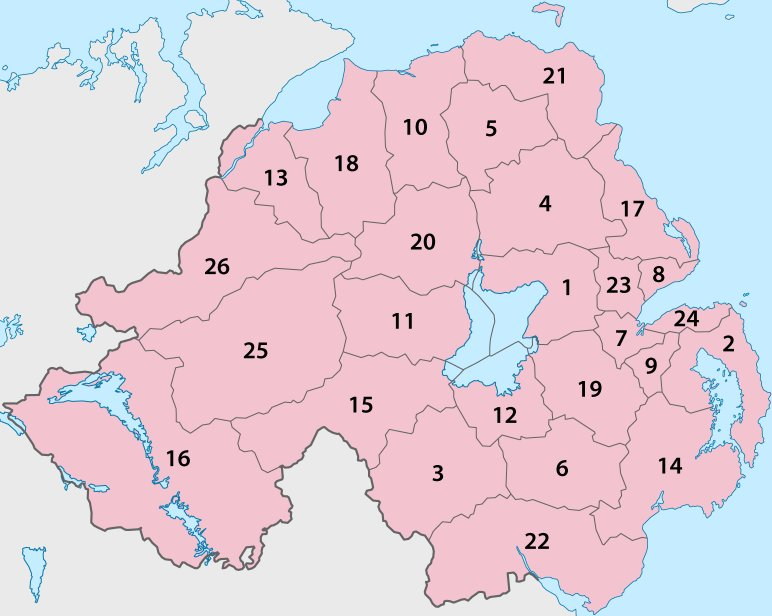
The 26 old local government districts

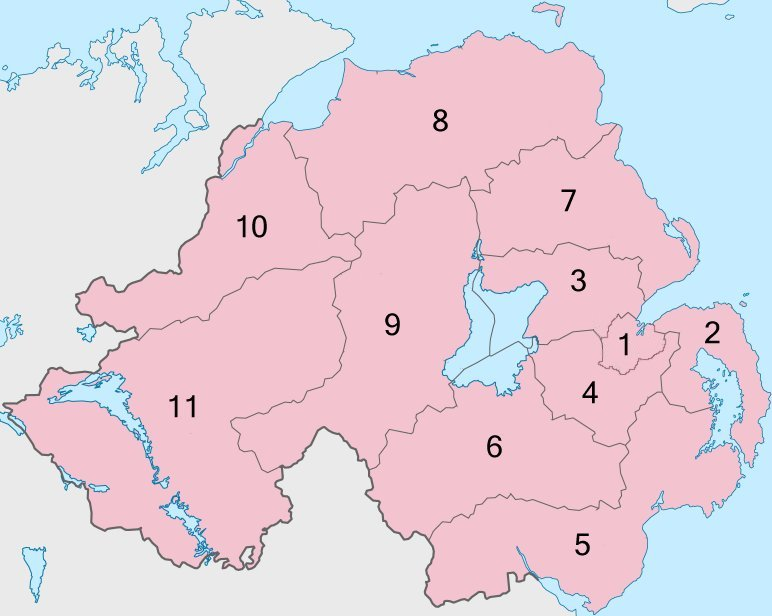
The 11 new local government districts

== Results ==
Because these elections were contested with new electoral boundaries, the results are not directly comparable with those of the last election. However, psephologist Nicholas Whyte has calculated a baseline by which to judge the parties' relative performance. This baseline is used in the following tables.

=== Largest Party by Council ===
Map showing the party that received the most votes by district electoral area.

Council	1st party 2011 (notional)	2nd party 2011 (notional)	1st party 2014	2nd party 2014	Councillors
Belfast City	Sinn Féin (19)	DUP (17)	Sinn Féin (19)	DUP (13)	60
North Down & Ards	DUP (19)	Alliance (8)	DUP (17)	UUP (9)	40
Antrim & Newtownabbey	DUP (17)	UUP (9)	DUP (15)	UUP (12)	40
Lisburn & Castlereagh	DUP (20)	UUP (7)	DUP (20)	UUP (8)	40
Newry, Mourne & Down	Sinn Féin (16)	SDLP (14)	Sinn Féin (14)	SDLP (14)	41
Armagh, Banbridge & Craigavon	DUP (13)	UUP (12)	DUP (13)	UUP (12)	41
Mid & East Antrim	DUP (19)	UUP (8)	DUP (16)	UUP (9)	40
Causeway Coast & Glens	DUP (15)	Sinn Féin (9)	DUP (11)	UUP (10)	40
Mid-Ulster	Sinn Féin (17)	DUP (9)	Sinn Féin (18)	DUP (8)	40
Derry & Strabane	Sinn Féin (16)	SDLP (13)	Sinn Féin (16)	SDLP (10)	40
Fermanagh & Omagh	Sinn Féin (18)	UUP (9)	Sinn Féin (17)	UUP (9)	40
All eleven councils	DUP (145)	Sinn Féin (115)	DUP (130)	Sinn Féin (105)	462

=== Results by Council ===
Council	Councillors	Women	Council seats by party											
Council	Councillors	Women	Alliance	DUP	Green	NI21	PUP	Sinn Féin	SDLP	TUV	UKIP	UUP	Inds	Other
Antrim & Newtownabbey	40	8	4	15	–	–	–	3	4	2	–	12	–	–
Armagh, Banbridge & Craigavon	41	11	–	13	–	–	–	8	6	–	1	12	1	–
Belfast City	60	20	8	13	1	–	3	19	7	1	–	7	–	1
Causeway Coast & Glens	40	11	1	11	–	–	1	7	6	3	–	10	1	–
Derry & Strabane	40	9	–	8	–	–	–	16	10	–	–	2	4	–
Fermanagh & Omagh	40	10	–	5	–	–	–	17	8	–	–	9	1	–
Lisburn & Castlereagh	40	9	7	20	–	1	–	–	3	1	–	8	–	–
Mid & East Antrim	40	12	3	16	–	–	–	3	1	5	1	9	2	–
Mid-Ulster	40	10	–	8	–	–	–	18	6	–	–	7	1	–
Newry, Mourne & Down	41	9	2	4	–	–	–	14	14	–	1	3	3	–
North Down & Ards	40	7	7	17	3	–	–	–	1	1	–	9	2	–
Total	462	116	32	130	4	1	4	105	66	13	3	88	15	1
% of total		25.1%	6.93%	28.14%	0.87%	0.22%	0.87%	22.73%	14.29%	2.81%	0.65%	19.05%	3.25%	0.22%

==== Belfast ====
Party	Candidates	Elected
Alliance	17	8
Democratic Unionist Party	21	13
Éirígí	2	0
Green Party (Northern Ireland)	5	1
Independents	4	0
Northern Ireland Conservatives	3	0
NI21	13	0
People before Profit Alliance	1	1
Progressive Unionist Party	9	3
Republican Network for Unity	2	0
Sinn Féin	24	19
Social Democratic & Labour Party	15	7
Socialist Party (Northern Ireland)	2	0
Traditional Unionist Voice	5	1
UK Independence Party	2	0
Ulster Unionist Party	10	7
The Workers Party	6	0

=== Results by party ===
Party	Councillors			% of councillors			First preference votes			% of FP votes		
Party	2011 (notional)	2014	+/-	2011 (notional)	2014	+/-	2011	2014	+/-	2011	2014	+/-
DUP	145	130	▼15	31.4%	28.1%	▼3.3%	179,436	144,928	▼34,508	27.2%	23.1%	▼4.1%
Sinn Féin	115	105	▼10	24.9%	22.7%	▼2.2%	163,712	151,137	▼12,575	24.8%	24.1%	▼0.7%
UUP	77	88	▲11	16.7%	19.0%	▲2.3%	100,643	101,385	▲742	15.2%	16.1%	▲0.9%
SDLP	67	66	▼1	14.5%	14.2%	▼0.3%	99,325	85,237	▼14,088	15.0%	13.6%	▼1.4%
Alliance	34	32	▼2	7.4%	6.9%	▼0.5%	48,859	41,769	▼7,090	7.4%	6.7%	▼0.7%
TUV	3	13	▲10	0.6%	2.8%	▲2.2%	13,079	28,310	▲15,231	2.0%	4.5%	▲2.5%
PUP	1	4	▲3	0.2%	0.8%	▲0.6%	3,858	12,753	▲8,895	0.6%	2.0%	▲1.4%
Green (NI)	1	4	▲3	0.2%	0.8%	▲0.6%	6,317	5,515	▼802	1.0%	0.8%	▼0.2%
UKIP	1	3	▲2	0.2%	0.6%	▲0.4%	2,550	9,311	▲6,761	0.4%	1.4%	▲1.0%
NI21	0	1	▲1	0.0%	0.2%	▲0.2%	0	11,495	▲11,495	0.0%	1.8%	▲1.8%
People Before Profit	0	1	▲1	0.0%	0.2%	▲0.2%	1,721	1,923	▲202	0.3%	0.3%	▲0.0%
NI Conservatives	0	0	Steady	0.0%	0.0%	Steady	1,321	2,527	▲1,206	0.2%	0.4%	▲0.2%
éirígí	0	0	Steady	0.0%	0.0%	Steady	2,062	1,756	▼306	0.3%	0.3%	▼0.0%
Workers' Party	0	0	Steady	0.0%	0.0%	Steady	760	985	▲225	0.1	0.2%	▲0.1%
Fermanagh Against Fracking	0	0	Steady	0.0%	0.0%	Steady	0	555	▲555	0.0%	0.1%	▲0.1%
Republican Network for Unity	0	0	Steady	0.0%	0.0%	Steady	0	502	▲502	0.0%	0.1%	▲0.1%
Community Partnership	0	0	Steady	0.0%	0.0%	Steady	800	388	▼412	0.1	0.1%	▼0.0%
Socialist Party	0	0	Steady	0.0%	0.0%	Steady	682	272	▼410	0.1%	0.0%	▼0.1%
BNP	0	0	Steady	0.0%	0.0%	Steady	491	174	▼317	0.1%	0.0%	▼0.1%
Democracy First	0	0	Steady	0.0%	0.0%	Steady	0	173	▲173	0.0%	0.0%	▲0.0%
Others	0	0	Steady	0.0%	0.0%	Steady	2,142	0	▼2,142	0.3%	0.0%	▼0.3%
Independent	18	15	▼3	3.9%	3.2%	▼0.7%	32,151	26,682	▼5,469	4.9%	4.2%	▼0.7%
Total	462	462	Steady	100%	100%	Steady	660,631	627,777	▼32,854	100%	100%	Steady

== Councils ==
=== Antrim and Newtownabbey ===
Airport
Party	Candidate	1st Pref
Sinn Féin	Anne-Marie Logue	1,212
SDLP	Thomas Burns	975
DUP	Matthew Magill	923
UUP	Paul Michael	798
UUP	Mervyn Rea	726
DUP	Roy Thompson	609
Alliance	Alan Lawther	547
NI21	Heather Fee	276
SDLP	Oran Keenan	121
Turnout		6,187

Antrim
Party	Candidate	1st Pref
UUP	Adrian Cochrane-Watson	785
DUP	Nigel Kells	662
Sinn Féin	Noel Maguire	632
DUP	John Smyth	631
Alliance	Neil Kelly	620
SDLP	Roisin Lynch	608
UUP	Drew Ritchie	572
TUV	Richard Cairns	560
DUP	Brian Graham	540
Alliance	Sian O'Neill	182
NI21	George Young	144
Turnout		5,939

Ballyclare
Party	Candidate	1st Pref
DUP	Mandy Girvan	930
UUP	James Bingham	819
UUP	Vera McWilliam	815
TUV	David Arthurs	750
DUP	Tim Girvan	584
Alliance	Pat McCudden	553
DUP	Jordan Greer	493
NI21	Gary English	312
PUP	Scott McDowell	214
Independent	David McMaster	104
Independent	Robert Moore	39
Turnout		5,613

Dunsilly
Party	Candidate	1st Pref
UUP	Roderick Swann	1,111
DUP	Linda Clarke	892
DUP	Trevor Beatty	886
Sinn Féin	Henry Cushinan	778
Sinn Féin	Anthony Brady	702
SDLP	Brian Duffin	677
Alliance	Julian McGrath	490
SDLP	Ryan Wilson	450
Turnout		5,986

Glengormley Urban
Party	Candidate	1st Pref
UUP	Mark Cosgrove	1,193
DUP	Audrey Ball	897
Sinn Féin	Michael Goodman	857
Alliance	John Blair	796
DUP	Phillip Brett	756
SDLP	Noreen McClelland	737
Sinn Féin	Gerry O'Reilly	695
DUP	Sam Flanagan	484
UUP	Michael Maguire	411
Alliance	Sam Nelson	346
NI21	Mary Higgins	255
Turnout		7,427

Macedon
Party	Candidate	1st Pref
DUP	Billy De Courcy	844
Alliance	Billy Webb	830
TUV	David Hollis	645
DUP	Thomas Hogg	581
Sinn Féin	Brónach Anglin	558
DUP	Paul Hamill	538
UUP	John Scott	538
PUP	Ken Wilkinson	503
DUP	Victor Robinson	462
DUP	Dineen Walker	256
SDLP	Dominic Mullaghan	178
Turnout		5,931

Three Mile Water
Party	Candidate	1st Pref
UUP	Fraser Agnew	1,275
Alliance	Tom Campbell	745
DUP	William Ball	738
UUP	Ben Kelso	587
DUP	Stephen Ross	557
DUP	Pamela Barr	526
TUV	Trevor Mawhinney	524
Alliance	Lynn Frazer	424
NI21	Gary Grattan	369
PUP	Darren Logan	343
DUP	Robert Hill	293
PUP	Jackie Shaw	225
Turnout		6,606

=== Armagh, Banbridge and Craigavon ===
Armagh
Party	Candidate	1st Pref
Sinn Féin	Garath Keating	2,298
SDLP	Thomas O'Hanlon	1,705
Sinn Féin	Darren McNally	1,396
SDLP	Mealla Campbell	1,350
UUP	Sam Nicholson	1,329
DUP	Freda Donnelly	1,095
Sinn Féin	Gerard White	982
UUP	Joy Rollston	878
UKIP	Adam Watt	240
Alliance	Mohammad Zahid	140
Turnout		11,413

Banbridge
Party	Candidate	1st Pref
UUP	Glenn Barr	1,999
UUP	Ian Burns	1,373
UUP	Elizabeth Ingram	1,318
DUP	Junior McCrum	1,030
SDLP	Seamus Doyle	975
DUP	Paul Greenfield	966
Sinn Féin	Brendan Curran	862
DUP	Ian Wilson	730
SDLP	Marie Hamilton	680
Alliance	Sheila McQuaid	579
Sinn Féin	Kevin Savage	547
NI21	Emma Hutchinson	371
Turnout		11,430

Craigavon
Party	Candidate	1st Pref
UUP	Kenneth Twyble	1,389
DUP	Robert Smith	1,250
Sinn Féin	Fergal Lennon	910
DUP	Margaret Tinsley	899
SDLP	Declan McAlinden	841
Sinn Féin	Tommy O'Connor	782
Independent	Kieran Corr	490
UUP	Julie Flaherty	445
SDLP	Thomas Larkham	439
PUP	Brian Cummings	411
Alliance	John Cleland	397
Sinn Féin	Vincent McAleenan	213
Turnout		8,466

Cusher
Party	Candidate	1st Pref
UUP	Jim Speers	2,221
Independent	Paul Berry	1,927
UUP	Gordon Kennedy	1,812
DUP	Gareth Wilson	1,285
SDLP	Sharon Haughey	1,200
DUP	Tim McClelland	1,025
Sinn Féin	Mary Doyle	1,023
Turnout		10,493

Lagan River
Party	Candidate	1st Pref
DUP	Mark Baxter	1,341
DUP	Paul Rankin	1,268
UUP	Marc Woods	1,023
UUP	Carol Black	845
DUP	Hazel Gamble	804
TUV	Samuel Morrison	766
UUP	Olive Mercer	764
Alliance	Harry Hamilton	522
SDLP	Maureen Litter	316
NI21	Neville Hutchinson	287
Sinn Féin	Ciara Downey	272
Independent	Frazer McCammond	173
Turnout		8,381

Lurgan
Party	Candidate	1st Pref
DUP	Carla Lockhart	2,013
Sinn Féin	Máire Cairns	1,002
Sinn Féin	Keith Haughian	930
UUP	Colin McCusker	903
Sinn Féin	Catherine Seeley	844
SDLP	Joe Nelson	839
Sinn Féin	Noel McGeown	756
SDLP	Pat McDade	648
Alliance	Peter Lavery	589
Sinn Féin	Liam Mackle	587
DUP	Philip Moutray	583
UUP	Aaron Carson	539
TUV	Roy Ferguson	370
PUP	Lexi Davidson	321
UKIP	Jonny Johns	264
SDLP	Anna Ochal-Molenda	173
NI21	Stuart McClelland	141
Turnout		11,502

Portadown
Party	Candidate	1st Pref
DUP	Jonathan Buckley	1,738
UUP	Doug Beattie	1,089
UUP	Arnold Hatch	955
DUP	Darryn Causby	1,738
Sinn Féin	Gemma McKenna	756
SDLP	Eamon McNeill	917
Sinn Féin	Paul Duffy	827
UKIP	David Jones	818
DUP	Terry McWilliams	753
TUV	Paul Coleman	716
PUP	John Stevenson	542
Alliance	Pete Giffen	213
NI21	Kyle Thomas	85
Turnout		10,536

=== Belfast ===
Balmoral
Party	Candidate	1st Pref
Sinn Féin	Máirtín Ó Muilleoir	1,525
SDLP	Claire Hanna	1,524
DUP	Christopher Stalford	968
DUP	Sarah Clarke	950
UUP	Jeffrey Dudgeon	878
Alliance	Paula Bradshaw	806
SDLP	Justin Cartwright	589
PUP	Simon Rice	533
Alliance	Jamie Doyle	430
NI21	Tina McKenzie	256
Green (NI)	Elli Kontorravdis	224
NI21	Barbara Neeson	74
NI Conservatives	David Timson	74
Independent	Gerard Collins	70
Turnout		8,901

Black Mountain
Party	Candidate	1st Pref
Sinn Féin	Steven Corr	1,793
Sinn Féin	Janice Austin	1,784
People Before Profit	Gerry Carroll	1,691
Sinn Féin	Emma Groves	1,628
Sinn Féin	Arder Carson	1,509
Sinn Féin	Caoimhín Mhic Giolla Mhin	1,428
Sinn Féin	Ciarán Beattie	1,340
SDLP	Tim Attwood	1,258
Éirígí	Pádraic MacCoitir	1,026
Workers' Party	Joanne Lowry	159
SDLP	Gerard McDonald	133
Alliance	Lauren Gray	110
NI21	Chris Valente	83
Turnout		13,942

Botanic
Party	Candidate	1st Pref
Sinn Féin	Deirdre Hargey	1,326
DUP	Ruth Patterson	1,268
SDLP	Declan Boyle	971
Alliance	Emmet McDonough-Brown	843
Green (NI)	Clare Bailey	772
Alliance	Duncan Morrow	769
UUP	Graham Craig	766
SDLP	Patrick McCarthy	530
TUV	Billy Dickson	509
PUP	Ewan Suttie	351
NI21	Eileen Chan-Hu	261
NI21	Ben Matthews	233
Socialist Party	Paddy Meehan	164
NI Conservatives	Ben Manton	125
Workers' Party	Paddy Lynn	106
Turnout		8,994

Castle
Party	Candidate	1st Pref
Sinn Féin	Mary Ellen Campbell	1,619
DUP	Guy Spence	1,339
DUP	Lydia Patterson	1,276
SDLP	Patrick Convery	1,197
UUP	David Browne	1,133
Sinn Féin	Tierna Cunningham	1,038
Alliance	Nuala McAllister	1,020
PUP	William McQuade	657
SDLP	Cathal Mullaghan	554
NI21	Alison Crawford	336
Independent	Fra Hughes	218
Workers' Party	Gemma Weir	191
Turnout		10,578

Collin
Party	Candidate	1st Pref
Sinn Féin	David Bell	1,669
Sinn Féin	Stephen Maginnis	1,618
Sinn Féin	Charlene O'Hara	1,476
Sinn Féin	Matt Garrett	1,452
Sinn Féin	Bill Groves	1,308
SDLP	Brian Heading	1,067
Éirígí	Máire Drumm	730
SDLP	Laura Whinnery	511
UUP	Gareth Martin	476
NI21	Wendy Burke	427
Alliance	Gerard Catney	424
Turnout		11,158

Court
Party	Candidate	1st Pref
PUP	Billy Hutchinson	1,674
DUP	Frank McCoubrey	1,557
Sinn Féin	Mary McConville	1,400
Sinn Féin	Jim McVeigh	1,357
DUP	Brian Kingston	1,134
TUV	Jolene Bunting	839
UUP	Bill Manwaring	651
DUP	Billy Mawhinney	607
SDLP	Colin Keenan	563
DUP	Nicola Verner	516
DUP	Naomi Thompson	365
Workers' Party	John Lowry	296
Republican Network	Tommy Doherty	282
Alliance	Sheila Gallagher	129
NI21	Stuart Hunter	117
Independent	Willie Faulkner	18
Turnout		11,505

Lisnasharragh
Party	Candidate	1st Pref
Alliance	Michael Long	1,726
DUP	Aileen Graham	1,546
UUP	Chris McGimpsey	1,362
DUP	Tommy Sandford	980
DUP	Colin Hussey	916
SDLP	Kate Mullan	878
Alliance	Carole Howard	860
Sinn Féin	Dermot Kennedy	637
PUP	Helen Smyth	630
Green (NI)	Connal Hughes	485
NI21	Leah McDonnell	315
NI21	Pete Wray	162
Turnout		11,505

Oldpark
Party	Candidate	1st Pref
Sinn Féin	Mary Clarke	1,559
Sinn Féin	J. J. Magee	1,240
Sinn Féin	Gerry McCabe	1,207
DUP	Gareth McKee	1,139
SDLP	Nichola Mallon	923
Independent	Dee Fennell	846
PUP	Julie-Anne Corr	774
DUP	Lee Reynolds	764
Sinn Féin	John Loughran	697
UUP	Colin Houston	366
Alliance	Peter McReynolds	320
TUV	Wayne Gilmour	317
Republican Network	Sammy Cusick	220
Workers' Party	Christopher Bailie	163
Turnout		10,535

Ormiston
Party	Candidate	1st Pref
UUP	Jim Rodgers	1,899
Alliance	Mervyn Jones	1,184
DUP	Tom Haire	1,072
Alliance	Ross McMullan	899
Alliance	Laura McNamee	898
Green (NI)	Ross Brown	831
DUP	John Hussey	821
DUP	Denny Vitty	809
DUP	Brian Kennedy	750
PUP	Ian Shanks	720
TUV	John Hiddleston	640
UUP	Peter Johnston	622
UKIP	Stephen Crosby	618
Alliance	Andrew Webb	561
NI21	Ian Dickson	245
NI21	Jayne Olorunda	192
NI Conservatives	Ian Reid	162
SDLP	Michael McMillan	95
Sinn Féin	Laura Keenan	56
Turnout		13,074

Titanic
Party	Candidate	1st Pref
UUP	Sonia Copeland	1,651
Sinn Féin	Niall Ó Donnghaile	1,156
PUP	John Kyle	1,150
DUP	Gavin Robinson	1,148
DUP	Adam Newton	1,017
Alliance	David Armitage	780
Alliance	Máire Hendron	719
TUV	Harry Toan	578
UKIP	Jonny Lavery	544
DUP	Sam White	416
NI21	Jimmy Davidson	252
Green (NI)	Gregor Claus	212
Socialist Party	Tommy Black	108
SDLP	Peter Devlin	99
Workers' Party	Kevin McNally	70
Turnout		9,900

=== Causeway Coast and Glens ===
Ballymoney
Party	Candidate	1st Pref
DUP	John Finlay	1,075
Sinn Féin	Philip McGuigan	941
TUV	William Blair	846
UUP	Darryl Wilson	754
TUV	Jamise McIlhagga	632
UUP	Tom McKeown	621
Sinn Féin	Leanne Peacock	615
DUP	Ian Stevenson	593
DUP	Jonathan Wallace	530
DUP	Alan McLean	528
SDLP	Harry Boyle	334
Alliance	Stephen McFarland	304
Independent	Charley O'Kane	196
SDLP	Angela Mulholland	149
NI Conservatives	James Simpson	129
Turnout		8,247

Bann
Party	Candidate	1st Pref
UUP	William King	1,127
DUP	Michelle Knight-McQuillan	1,025
Sinn Féin	Ciaran Archibald	994
DUP	Sam Cole	892
UUP	Richard Holmes	880
SDLP	Róisín Loftus	875
TUV	Elizabeth Collins	550
Alliance	Charlie McConaghy	235
Turnout		6,578

Benbradagh
Party	Candidate	1st Pref
Sinn Féin	Seán McGlinchey	1,460
TUV	Boyd Douglas	1,160
Sinn Féin	Dermot Nicholl	833
DUP	Edgar Scott	750
SDLP	Orla Beattie	686
Sinn Féin	Tony McCaul	632
SDLP	Michael Coyle	392
Turnout		5,913

Causeway
Party	Candidate	1st Pref
DUP	Frank Campbell	910
UUP	Sandra Hunter	762
Alliance	Barney Fitzpatrick	745
SDLP	Maura Hickey	699
UUP	Norman Hillis	669
DUP	Mark Fielding	643
TUV	Sharon McKillop	616
DUP	Bill Kennedy	497
UUP	Robert McPherson	464
Independent	Alison Torrens	282
NI21	David Alexander	265
DUP	Angela Knott	260
UKIP	Adrian Parke	229
Independent	Leanne Abernethy	207
TUV	Thomas Stirling	161
Turnout		7,409

Coleraine
Party	Candidate	1st Pref
PUP	Russell Watton	777
SDLP	Stephanie Quigley	721
DUP	George Duddy	710
UUP	William McCandless	641
DUP	Trevor Clarke	627
UUP	David Harding	539
DUP	Tracy Craig	483
Alliance	Yvonne Boyle	408
Sinn Féin	Margaret Fleming	383
DUP	Phyllis Fielding	360
TUV	Tommy Collins	327
Independent	Billy Ellis	284
UKIP	William Ogilby	187
NI21	Chris McCaw	113
Turnout		6,560

Limavady
Party	Candidate	1st Pref
DUP	Alan Robinson	1,451
Sinn Féin	Brenda Chivers	797
SDLP	Gerry Mullan	576
DUP	James McCorkill	462
UUP	Aaron Callan	452
UUP	Raymond Kennedy	394
Sinn Féin	Rory Donaghy	462
TUV	Howard Gordon	325
DUP	Jonathan Holmes	292
SDLP	Jason Allen	268
UKIP	Richard Nicholl	102
Turnout		5,491

The Glens
Party	Candidate	1st Pref
Sinn Féin	Cara McShane	839
Independent	Padraig McShane	835
Sinn Féin	Kieran Mulholland	745
Sinn Féin	Colum Thompson	702
UUP	Joan Baird	675
Independent	Ambrose Laverty	627
SDLP	Margaret Anne McKillop	555
SDLP	Donal Cunningham	513
DUP	Evelyne Robinson	494
TUV	Cyril Quigg	229
SDLP	Joanne McKeown	143
Alliance	Colin Mayrs	130
Turnout		6,487

=== Derry and Strabane ===
Ballyarnett
Party	Candidate	1st Pref
Sinn Féin	Sandra Duffy	1,163
SDLP	Angela Dobbins	1,155
Sinn Féin	Tony Hassan	1,092
Independent	Dermot Quigley	1,037
Sinn Féin	Elisha McCallion	985
SDLP	Brian Tierney	963
SDLP	Jimmy Carr	605
SDLP	Colm O'Connor	551
Alliance	Danny McCloskey	139
Turnout		7,690

Derg
Party	Candidate	1st Pref
UUP	Derek Hussey	1,411
Sinn Féin	Ruairí McHugh	1,102
Sinn Féin	Kieran McGuire	1,072
Sinn Féin	Maolíosa McHugh	1,055
DUP	Thomas Kerrigan	924
DUP	Sharon Smyth	693
TUV	Robert Oliver	521
SDLP	Jim McIntyre	416
SDLP	Marie Ash	410
Turnout		7,604

Faughan
Party	Candidate	1st Pref
DUP	Gary Middleton	1,077
DUP	Maurice Devenney	936
Sinn Féin	Paul Fleming	895
UUP	Ronnie McKeegan	555
Independent	Paul Hughes	501
SDLP	Jim McKeever	493
SDLP	Gus Hastings	492
SDLP	Brenda Stevenson	490
Sinn Féin	Michael McCrossan	358
Alliance	David Hawthorne	336
UKIP	Geoff Cruickshank	185
Turnout		6,318

Foyleside
Party	Candidate	1st Pref
SDLP	John Boyle	1,132
Independent	Darren O'Reilly	1,091
Sinn Féin	Michael Cooper	801
Sinn Féin	Eric McGinley	791
SDLP	Rory Farrell	743
SDLP	Shauna Cusack	740
Sinn Féin	Barney O'Hagan	701
People Before Profit	Sha Gillespie	232
Alliance	Daniel Comer	137
Turnout		6,368

Sperrin
Party	Candidate	1st Pref
DUP	Allan Bresland	1,179
Sinn Féin	Karina Carlin	1,169
Sinn Féin	Dan Kelly	1,015
Independent	Paul Gallagher	978
Sinn Féin	Diarmuid Ward	970
Sinn Féin	Brian McMahon	966
DUP	Rhonda Hamilton	965
SDLP	Patsy Kelly	816
Independent	Eugene McMenamin	690
UUP	William Jamieson	588
SDLP	Patrick Leonard	559
SDLP	Liam Stewart	185
Turnout		10,080

The Moor
Party	Candidate	1st Pref
Independent	Gary Donnelly	1,154
Sinn Féin	Kevin Campbell	1,104
Sinn Féin	Patricia Logue	997
SDLP	Seán Carr	841
Sinn Féin	Colly Kelly	775
SDLP	Emmet Doyle	676
Sinn Féin	Liam Friel	654
SDLP	Dermott Henderson	542
Independent	Patrick Mellon	113
Turnout		6,856

Waterside
Party	Candidate	1st Pref
SDLP	Gerard Diver	1,080
Sinn Féin	Christopher Jackson	1,063
UUP	Mary Hamilton	1,046
SDLP	Martin Reilly	884
DUP	Hilary McClintock	811
Sinn Féin	Bridget Meehan	656
DUP	Drew Thompson	607
DUP	David Ramsey	553
DUP	Niree McMorris	528
UUP	Julia Kee	465
UKIP	Kyle Thompson	287
PUP	Nigel Gardiner	274
Alliance	Asta Kereviciene	241
UKIP	David Malcolm	224
Independent	Michael Carlin	113
Turnout		8,832

=== Fermanagh and Omagh ===
Enniskillen
Party	Candidate	1st Pref
Sinn Féin	Tommy Maguire	792
UUP	Robert Irvine	778
DUP	Keith Elliott	778
Sinn Féin	Debbie Coyle	670
SDLP	Patricia Rodgers	641
TUV	Donald Crawford	636
Independent	Donal O'Cofaigh	555
UUP	Howard Thornton	546
DUP	Shirley Donaldson	503
Independent	Pat Cox	313
UUP	Basil Johnston	306
Alliance	Ann Gormley	148
Green (NI)	Laurence Speight	71
Turnout		6,737

Erne East
Party	Candidate	1st Pref
UUP	Victor Warrington	1,272
DUP	Paul Robinson	1,246
Sinn Féin	Tom O'Reilly	1,075
Sinn Féin	Brian McCaffrey	1,041
SDLP	Richie McPhillips	1,015
Sinn Féin	Sheamus Greene	1,005
Sinn Féin	Kate Mulligan	902
UKIP	Fred Parkinson	296
Turnout		7,852

Erne North
Party	Candidate	1st Pref
UUP	Rosemary Barton	1,289
UUP	Raymond Farrell	1,108
Sinn Féin	John Feely	893
Sinn Féin	Peter Jones	654
SDLP	John Coyle	628
DUP	David Mahon	600
TUV	Alex Elliott	455
SDLP	Paul Blake	414
DUP	James Fleming	249
Turnout		6,290

Erne West
Party	Candidate	1st Pref
UUP	Alex Baird	1,619
Independent	Bernice Swift	1,195
Sinn Féin	Barry Doherty	985
SDLP	Brendan Gallagher	962
Sinn Féin	Anthony Feely	946
Sinn Féin	Leanne Maguire	791
DUP	Jeremy Campbell	425
Turnout		6,923

Mid Tyrone
Party	Candidate	1st Pref
UUP	Bert Wilson	1,262
Sinn Féin	Seán Clarke	1,222
Sinn Féin	Ann Marie Fitzgerald	1,115
Sinn Féin	Seán Donnelly	989
Sinn Féin	Barry McNally	893
DUP	Charlie Chittick	629
SDLP	Rosemarie Shields	539
SDLP	Bernard McGrath	400
Green (NI)	Ciaran McClean	198
Alliance	Andrew Bullick	122
Turnout		7,369

Omagh
Party	Candidate	1st Pref
SDLP	Josephine Deehan	946
Sinn Féin	Sorcha McAnespy	932
Sinn Féin	Marty McColgan	742
UUP	Chris Smyth	681
DUP	Errol Thompson	644
Sinn Féin	Catherine Kelly	556
DUP	Adele Crawford	545
SDLP	Joanne Donnelly	435
Alliance	Eric Bullick	376
Independent	Gabrielle McAleer	84
Turnout		5,941

West Tyrone
Party	Candidate	1st Pref
Sinn Féin	Glenn Campbell	1,595
UUP	Allan Rainey	1,297
Sinn Féin	Frankie Donnelly	1,038
DUP	Mark Buchanan	916
SDLP	Mary Garrity	784
Sinn Féin	Stephen McCann	650
DUP	Elaine Thompson	540
SDLP	Cathal Lynch	400
Alliance	Stephen Donnelly	173
Independent	Susan-Anne White	67
Turnout		7,460

=== Lisburn and Castlereagh ===
Castlereagh East
Party	Candidate	1st Pref
DUP	Tommy Jeffers	881
DUP	David Drysdale	823
DUP	Sharon Skillen	787
DUP	Lynda Spratt	700
TUV	Andrew Girvin	683
UUP	Hazel Legge	580
Alliance	Tim Morrow	521
PUP	Izzy Giles	492
Green (NI)	Martin Gregg	442
Alliance	Stephen Donnan	301
NI21	Mark Devenney	241
Independent	Robert Campbell	75
Independent	Sandra Wilson	61
Turnout		6,587

Castlereagh South
Party	Candidate	1st Pref
Alliance	Geraldine Rice	1,221
SDLP	John Gallen	964
DUP	Nathan Anderson	942
UUP	Michael Henderson	902
SDLP	Brian Hanvey	876
Sinn Féin	Nuala Toman	803
Alliance	Vasundhara Kamble	669
TUV	Wallace Douglas	520
DUP	Ben Mallon	499
DUP	Vikki Nelson	359
NI21	Elizabeth McCord	290
NI21	Adam Murray	69
Turnout		8,110

Downshire East
Party	Candidate	1st Pref
DUP	Luke Poots	1,245
DUP	Url Mackin	734
UUP	James Baird	734
Alliance	Aaron McIntyre	691
DUP	Janet Gray	480
UUP	Alex Swan	432
NI21	Christina Dobson	426
TUV	Tom Mateer	413
DUP	Roy Young	371
NI21	Glenn Wilson	271
UKIP	Peter Lindsay	199
Turnout		5,990

Downshire West
Party	Candidate	1st Pref
UUP	Jim Dillon	912
DUP	Allan Ewart	880
DUP	John Palmer	768
UUP	Alexander Redpath	671
Alliance	Owen Gawith	493
NI Conservatives	Neil Johnston	376
DUP	Colin Preen	347
TUV	Jonny Miller	335
UKIP	Rebecca McBride	286
SDLP	Dee French	231
NI21	Roger Duncan	206
NI21	Neil McNickle	148
Green (NI)	Luke Robinson	119
Turnout		5,772

Killultagh
Party	Candidate	1st Pref
DUP	Thomas Beckett	1,216
UUP	Robbie Butler	1,180
DUP	James Tinsley	864
Sinn Féin	Mary Quinn	854
DUP	William Leathem	809
SDLP	Pat Catney	698
Alliance	Jonnie McCrea	455
NI21	David Honeyford	399
Turnout		6,475

Lisburn North
Party	Candidate	1st Pref
UUP	Brian Bloomfield	1,026
DUP	Margaret Tolerton	735
Alliance	Stephen Martin	711
DUP	Scott Carson	684
DUP	Jenny Palmer	534
DUP	Yvonne Craig	526
Sinn Féin	Jacqui McGeough	493
SDLP	Nicola Turtle	466
UKIP	Alan Love	339
NI21	Johnny McCarthy	329
TUV	John McCall	300
NI21	Colin McCord	237
PUP	Matt Brennan	203
Independent	Jonny Orr	33
Turnout		6,616

Lisburn South
Party	Candidate	1st Pref
UUP	Tim Mitchell	874
DUP	Alan Givan	813
DUP	Paul Porter	768
DUP	Andrew Ewing	696
DUP	Rhoda Walker	565
DUP	Alan Carlisle	494
TUV	Andrew Moore	469
NI21	David Cairns	442
Alliance	Amanda Grehan	430
SDLP	Conor Quinn	423
Green (NI)	James McMurray	138
NI21	Andrew Doran	115
Turnout		6,227

=== Mid and East Antrim ===
Ballymena
Party	Candidate	1st Pref
Independent	James Henry	1,042
TUV	Donna Anderson	738
SDLP	Declan O'Loan	635
DUP	Andrey Wales	598
DUP	John Carson	582
Sinn Féin	Marian Maguire	477
DUP	Reuben Glover	427
UUP	Stephen Nicholl	381
TUV	Matthew Armstrong	377
DUP	David McCartney	332
Alliance	Jayne Dunlop	310
SDLP	Eugene Reid	289
NI21	Richard Marshall	211
Independent	Rodney Quigley	176
Turnout		6,575

Bannside
Party	Candidate	1st Pref
TUV	Timothy Gaston	1,212
Sinn Féin	Patrice Hardy	1,035
TUV	Stewart McDonald	951
UUP	William McNeilly	867
DUP	Tommy Nicholl	777
DUP	Thomas Gordon	673
UUP	Andrew Wright	668
DUP	Billy Henry	601
DUP	Phil Moffatt	582
Alliance	Philip Burnside	450
Turnout		7,816

Braid
Party	Candidate	1st Pref
UUP	Robin Cherry	961
DUP	William McCaughey	932
TUV	Brian Collins	912
DUP	Beth Adger	891
DUP	Beth Clyde	865
DUP	Samuel Hanna	800
Sinn Féin	Paul Maguire	722
TUV	Roy McPeake	597
DUP	Chris Wales	569
UUP	Brian Thompson	559
SDLP	Catherine O'Hara	524
Alliance	Danny Donnelly	299
PUP	William Parkhill	183
Turnout		8,814

Carrick Castle
Party	Candidate	1st Pref
UUP	John Stewart	939
Independent	James Brown	882
UKIP	Noel Jordan	749
DUP	Billy Ashe	749
Alliance	Gavin Norris	504
DUP	Cheryl Johnston	439
DUP	Fred Cobain	398
Alliance	Elena Aceves-Cully	342
TUV	William Knox	338
PUP	Jonathan Cooke	248
Independent	Nick Wady	131
Independent	John Cameron	105
Turnout		5,824

Coast Road
Party	Candidate	1st Pref
UUP	Maureen Morrow	946
Sinn Féin	James McKeown	756
DUP	Gordon Lyons	660
Alliance	Gerardine Mulvenna	590
TUV	Ruth Wilson	575
DUP	Drew Niblock	484
PUP	Jonathan Hodge	464
SDLP	Martin Wilson	416
Independent	Danny O'Connor	188
Independent	John Anderson	133
BNP	Robert Bell	101
BNP	Steven Moore	72
Turnout		5,386

Knockagh
Party	Candidate	1st Pref
UUP	Andrew Wilson	912
DUP	May Beattie	854
UUP	Lindsay Millar	581
TUV	Ken McFaul	557
Alliance	Paul Sinclair	479
DUP	Robert Stewart	477
Alliance	Noel Williams	417
DUP	Lynn McClurg	360
DUP	Robert Harrison-Rice	313
PUP	Gareth Cole	301
PUP	Jim McCaw	156
NI Conservatives	Gary Broad	107
Independent	Barry Patterson	104
Turnout		5,618

Larne Lough
Party	Candidate	1st Pref
DUP	Gregg McKeen	966
UUP	Mark McKinty	927
UUP	Andrew Wilson	836
TUV	Kenneth Johnston	606
Alliance	Robert Logan	583
NI21	Jeremy Jones	572
DUP	Paul Reid	457
DUP	Matthew Scott	307
Alliance	Michael Lynch	303
Sinn Féin	Seán Waide	128
Turnout		5,685

=== Mid Ulster ===
Carntogher
Party	Candidate	1st Pref
Sinn Féin	Seán McPeake	1,246
Sinn Féin	Kate McEldowney	1,200
SDLP	Martin Kearney	1,116
Sinn Féin	Brian McGuigan	1,073
Sinn Féin	Gabhán McFalone	1,060
DUP	James Shiels	675
UUP	Jackie Crawford	651
TUV	Noel Stewart	498
Turnout		7,520

Clogher Valley
Party	Candidate	1st Pref
DUP	Frances Burton	1,584
Sinn Féin	Phelim Gildernew	1,528
Sinn Féin	Seán McGuigan	1,290
SDLP	Sharon McAleer	1,151
UUP	Robert Mulligan	1,116
UUP	Neil Somerville	1,022
DUP	Wills Robinson	837
Turnout		8,528

Cookstown
Party	Candidate	1st Pref
Sinn Féin	Cathal Mallaghan	1,481
UUP	Trevor Wilson	1,319
Sinn Féin	John McNamee	1,254
Sinn Féin	Gavin Bell	996
UUP	Mark Glasgow	817
SDLP	Tony Quinn	803
DUP	Wilbert Buchanan	717
TUV	Walter Millar	636
DUP	Maureen Lees	415
SDLP	Maria Cleary-McGuffin	276
UKIP	Alan Day	195
Alliance	Mickey McDonald	117
Turnout		9,026

Dungannon
Party	Candidate	1st Pref
Independent	Barry Monteith	1,458
UUP	Walter Cuddy	1,083
Sinn Féin	Dominic Molloy	1,045
DUP	Kim Ashton	848
DUP	Clement Cuthbertson	693
SDLP	Denise Mullen	677
TUV	Kenny Loughrin	496
Sinn Féin	Dee Varsani	457
UUP	Winston Duff	421
Alliance	Hannah Su	233
Turnout		7,411

Magherafelt
Party	Candidate	1st Pref
DUP	Paul McLean	1,106
Sinn Féin	Seán Clarke	1,095
Sinn Féin	Darren Totten	975
UUP	George Shiels	785
TUV	Gareth Ferguson	750
SDLP	Christine McFlynn	719
DUP	Ross Mitchell	627
SDLP	Ben Niblock	362
Independent	Hugh McCloy	231
Independent	Michael Kelly	215
Independent	Robert Kelly	118
Turnout		6,983

Moyola
Party	Candidate	1st Pref
Sinn Féin	Caoimhe O'Neill	1,431
DUP	Anne Forde	1,370
Sinn Féin	Catherine Elattar	1,256
UUP	Derek McKinney	1,255
Sinn Féin	Peter Bateson	1,089
SDLP	Austin Kelly	1,004
Turnout		7,405

Torrent
Party	Candidate	1st Pref
Sinn Féin	Linda Dillon	1,218
Sinn Féin	Joe O'Neill	1,147
UUP	Kenneth Reid	1,104
Sinn Féin	Ronan McGinley	906
DUP	Keith Buchanan	851
Sinn Féin	Mickey Gillespie	840
SDLP	Deirdre Mayo	759
SDLP	Malachy Quinn	733
Independent	Feargal O'Donnell	667
Turnout		8,225

=== Newry, Mourne and Down ===
Crotlieve
Party	Candidate	1st Pref
SDLP	Declan McAteer	1,389
Sinn Féin	Sinéad Ennis	1,328
Sinn Féin	Mickey Ruane	1,195
SDLP	Gillian Fitzpatrick	1,097
SDLP	Michael Carr	1,008
UUP	William Mitchell	933
Sinn Féin	Mark Gibbons	858
SDLP	Connaire McGreevy	757
Independent	Jarlath Tinnelly	740
Independent	Finbarr Lambe	258
DUP	Wilma McCullough	226
Turnout		9,789

Downpatrick
Party	Candidate	1st Pref
SDLP	Colin McGrath	1,279
SDLP	Dermot Curran	1,076
Sinn Féin	Naomi Bailie	1,031
SDLP	Gareth Sharvin	961
Independent	Cadogan Enright	839
Sinn Féin	Eamonn McConvey	811
UUP	Graham Furey	373
DUP	Yvonne Moore	144
Turnout		6,514

Newry
Party	Candidate	1st Pref
Sinn Féin	Charlie Casey	1,693
Sinn Féin	Liz Kimmins	1,567
Sinn Féin	Valeria Harte	1,300
Independent	Davy Hyland	1,045
SDLP	Gary Stokes	938
SDLP	Peter McEvoy	664
SDLP	Kevin McAteer	629
SDLP	Jacinta Duffy	555
UUP	Joshua Lowry	384
Independent	James Malone	41
Turnout		8,816

Rowallane
Party	Candidate	1st Pref
SDLP	Terry Andrews	1,321
UUP	Robert Burgess	1,145
DUP	Harry Harvey	952
DUP	Billy Walker	943
UUP	Walter Lyons	672
Sinn Féin	Eddie Hughes	552
Alliance	Patrick Brown	510
TUV	Philip Hamilton	433
NI21	Alistair Straney	1,145
Independent	Mickey Coogan	149
Turnout		6,944

Slieve Croob
Party	Candidate	1st Pref
Sinn Féin	Stephen Burns	1,303
DUP	Garth Craig	1,021
Sinn Féin	Pól Ó Gribín	940
SDLP	Mark Murnin	940
UUP	Desmond Patterson	718
Alliance	Patrick Clarke	690
SDLP	Audrey Byrne	514
SDLP	Shane King	418
UKIP	Alan Lewis	407
NI21	Matthew Morrison	111
Turnout		6,906

Slieve Gullion
Party	Candidate	1st Pref
Sinn Féin	Terry Hearty	2,135
SDLP	Geraldine Donnelly	1,516
Sinn Féin	Mickey Larkin	1,411
Sinn Féin	Róisín Mulgrew	1,278
UUP	David Taylor	1,243
Sinn Féin	Barra Ó Muirí	1,218
SDLP	Kate Loughran	1,078
Sinn Féin	Daire Hughes	899
DUP	Lavelle McIlwrath	376
Turnout		11,154

The Mournes
Party	Candidate	1st Pref
UKIP	Henry Reilly	1,964
SDLP	Laura Devlin	1,789
Sinn Féin	Willie Clarke	1,581
Sinn Féin	Seán Doran	1,513
UUP	Harold McKee	1,352
SDLP	Brian Quinn	796
DUP	Glyn Hanna	973
UUP	Jill Macauley	494
Alliance	Ciaran McAvoy	260
NI21	Annette Holden	148
Turnout		10,869

=== North Down and Ards ===
Ards Peninsula
Party	Candidate	1st Pref
DUP	Robert Adair	1,773
SDLP	Joe Boyle	1,387
UUP	Angus Carson	1,199
DUP	Nigel Edmund	621
DUP	Louise Wallace	559
DUP	Eddie Thompson	456
Alliance	Kellie Armstrong	439
Sinn Féin	Sheila Bailie	388
NI Conservatives	Paul Leeman	161
Alliance	Colin McCormick	146
NI21	John Bustard	114
Turnout		7,243

Bangor Central
Party	Candidate	1st Pref
DUP	Wesley Irvine	643
UUP	Ian Henry	589
DUP	Alistair Cathcart	554
Green (NI)	Noelle Robinson	496
Independent	Mary Macartney	445
Alliance	Stuart Anderson	443
UUP	Carl McClean	442
DUP	Roberta Dunlop	434
Alliance	Nicholas Fell	395
Independent	David Chambers	387
UKIP	William Montgomery	385
TUV	William Cudworth	300
Independent	Colin Breen	274
Community Partnership	Mark Gordon	222
DUP	Adam Harbinson	203
NI21	Peter Floyd	174
NI Conservatives	David Symington	170
Turnout		6,556

Bangor East and Donaghadee
Party	Candidate	1st Pref
Independent	Alan Chambers	1,311
UUP	Mark Brooks	1,071
Alliance	Gavin Walker	672
DUP	Peter Martin	625
DUP	Bill Keery	558
DUP	Tom Smith	541
DUP	Terence Malcolm	492
UKIP	Patrick Toms	368
TUV	Joseph Strutt	362
Green (NI)	Trana Gray	265
UUP	Christopher Eisenstadt	224
NI21	William McKee	181
NI Conservatives	Brian McBride	175
Turnout		6,845

Bangor West
Party	Candidate	1st Pref
UUP	Marion Smith	870
DUP	Alan Graham	866
DUP	Alan Leslie	851
Alliance	Scott Wilson	619
TUV	Robert Gordon	491
Green (NI)	Paul Roberts	346
NI21	Steven Denny	344
Alliance	Laurence Thompson	315
SDLP	Ingrid Logan	264
NI Conservatives	Mark Brotherson	254
Community Partnership	Alison Blayney	166
Turnout		5,386

Comber
Party	Candidate	1st Pref
DUP	Robert Gibson	1,071
UUP	James Fletcher	863
Alliance	Deborah Girvan	815
DUP	Trevor Cummings	715
DUP	John Oswald	640
TUV	Stephen Cooper	577
UUP	Philip Smith	506
UKIP	Isabella Hanna	427
NI Conservatives	John Andrews	411
NI21	Margaret Howson	169
Turnout		6,194

Holywood and Clandeboye
Party	Candidate	1st Pref
DUP	Stephen Dunne	1,423
Green (NI)	John Barry	916
Alliance	Andrew Muir	910
UUP	Daniel Allen	619
DUP	Jennifer Gilmour	540
UUP	James McKerrow	475
Alliance	Kate Nicholl	456
SDLP	Peter Lismore	308
NI Conservatives	William O'Callaghan	265
NI21	Matthew Johnston	208
Independent	Gerard Leddy	34
Turnout		6,154

Newtownards
Party	Candidate	1st Pref
Independent	James Menagh	1,464
DUP	Naomi Armstrong	1,049
DUP	Stephen McIlveen	829
UUP	Richard Smart	639
UUP	Katherine Ferguson	595
DUP	Colin Kennedy	553
Alliance	Alan McDowell	538
TUV	David McMullen	522
Alliance	Linda Cleland	495
Independent	Ian Cox	384
NI21	Nichola Keenan	251
Independent	Sharon Hunt	206
NI Conservatives	William McKendry	118
Turnout		8,107
