= Lilian Seenoi-Barr =

Kenyan-Irish politician and councillor (born 1981)

Mayor of Derry City and Strabane
- In office 3 June 2024 – 2 June 2025
- Preceded by: Patricia Logue
- Succeeded by: Ruairí McHugh

Member of Derry City and Strabane District Council
- Incumbent
- Assumed office 9 June 2021
- Preceded by: Mary Durkan
- Constituency: Foyleside

Personal details
- Born: October 1981 (age 44–45) Narok, Kenya
- Party: Social Democratic and Labour Party

Lilian Seenoi-Barr (born October 1981) is a Kenyan-Irish Social Democratic and Labour Party politician who served as Mayor of Derry City and Strabane from 2024 to 2025. She is a councillor on Derry City and Strabane District Council, where she has represented the Foyleside electoral area since 2021. On 29 April 2024, Seenoi-Barr made history after being selected as the Mayor of Derry City and Strabane, becoming Northern Ireland's first black mayor. Originally from Kenya, she arrived in Northern Ireland as a refugee in 2010 and founded the North West Migrants Forum in 2012.

== Early life and career ==
Born in Narok, Kenya, Seenoi-Barr was initially raised in the village of Ol Ombokishi with her five sisters and eight brothers, and attended the village school until primary stage four. She then went to a school in Narok, where her mother ran a supermarket, and after secondary school attended university, where she studied women's reproductive health and community development. She became a prominent campaigner for gender rights among Maasai women, focusing on forced marriage and female genital mutilation, but was forced to leave Kenya along with her son following threats to their safety because of her work with Maasai women. She first arrived in Northern Ireland as a refugee in 2010, after being invited to Derry by the Changaro Trust, which had helped to build schools in rural Kenya. The Changaro Trust subsequently helped Seenoi-Barr and her son to apply for refugee status. In 2012, she founded the North West Migrants Forum, and became its programme manager. She also helped to organise the Black Lives Matter protests that took place in Derry's Guildhall Square in June 2020.

== Political career ==
A member of the Social Democratic and Labour Party (SDLP), who previously served as chair of its Derry City and Strabane branch, Seenoi-Barr first stood for election to Derry City and Strabane District Council's Foyleside electoral area in 2019, but was not successful despite polling well. In June 2021, she was co-opted onto the council following Councillor Mary Durkan's decision to step down from her role as councillor. She retained her Foyleside seat at the 2023 election, and in doing so became the first black person to be elected to public office in Northern Ireland.

=== Mayor of Derry and Strabane ===
On 29 April 2024, it was announced that Seemoi-Barr would become Northern Ireland's first black mayor after the SDLP appointed her as Derry and Strabane's First Citizen, succeeding Sinn Féin's Patricia Logue. She was installed as mayor at the council's Annual General Meeting on 3 June.

=== Reaction to her appointment ===
Responding to the announcement, Seemoi-Barr said she was "proud to be a Maasai woman and a Derry girl. I cannot express how much the honour of serving as mayor of Derry and Strabane means to me." Colum Eastwood, leader of the SDLP, and the Member of Parliament for Foyle, described Seenoi-Barr's appointment as "a historic moment" and said she "will be an incredible mayor".

However, Seenoi-Barr's appointment attracted criticism from some within her party, who felt the way the decision was made was undemocratic. Jason Barr, serving as deputy mayor of Derry and Strabane at the time of Seenoi-Barr's appointment, resigned from the SDLP, saying he had been "left in an untenable position due to the decisions made by the management committee". The appointment prompted a second resignation from the party a few days later, when Shauna Cusack became an independent councillor. On 4 May, the SDLP announced it would make changes to the way it made "civil leadership" appointments following the resignations.

News of her appointment attracted online abuse from prominent far-right figures and conspiracy theorists, such as Alex Jones and David Icke. Jones claimed in a post on X that "The WEF (World Economic Forum) is now installing invaders as mayors in Ireland just like in London". In response to this, and other online abuse, Seenoi-Barr said she was "aware" of it but "genuinely not interested", while Michelle O'Neill, the First Minister of Northern Ireland, said those purporting the abuse "do not speak for the wonderful and welcoming people of Derry and Strabane, and the work being done to build a better future for all". On 5 May, a man was arrested by police in Derry after making online threats to Seenoi-Barr following the announcement of her selection as mayor.

== Personal life ==
Seenoi-Barr has a son who was born in Kenya and came to Northern Ireland with her. She met her husband after arriving in Northern Ireland. Her brother, Ledama Olekina, is a member of the Kenyan Senate representing the Narok area.
