= 2019 Derry City and Strabane District Council election =

Local government election in Northern Ireland

- 2 May 2019

All 40 seats to Derry City and Strabane District Council
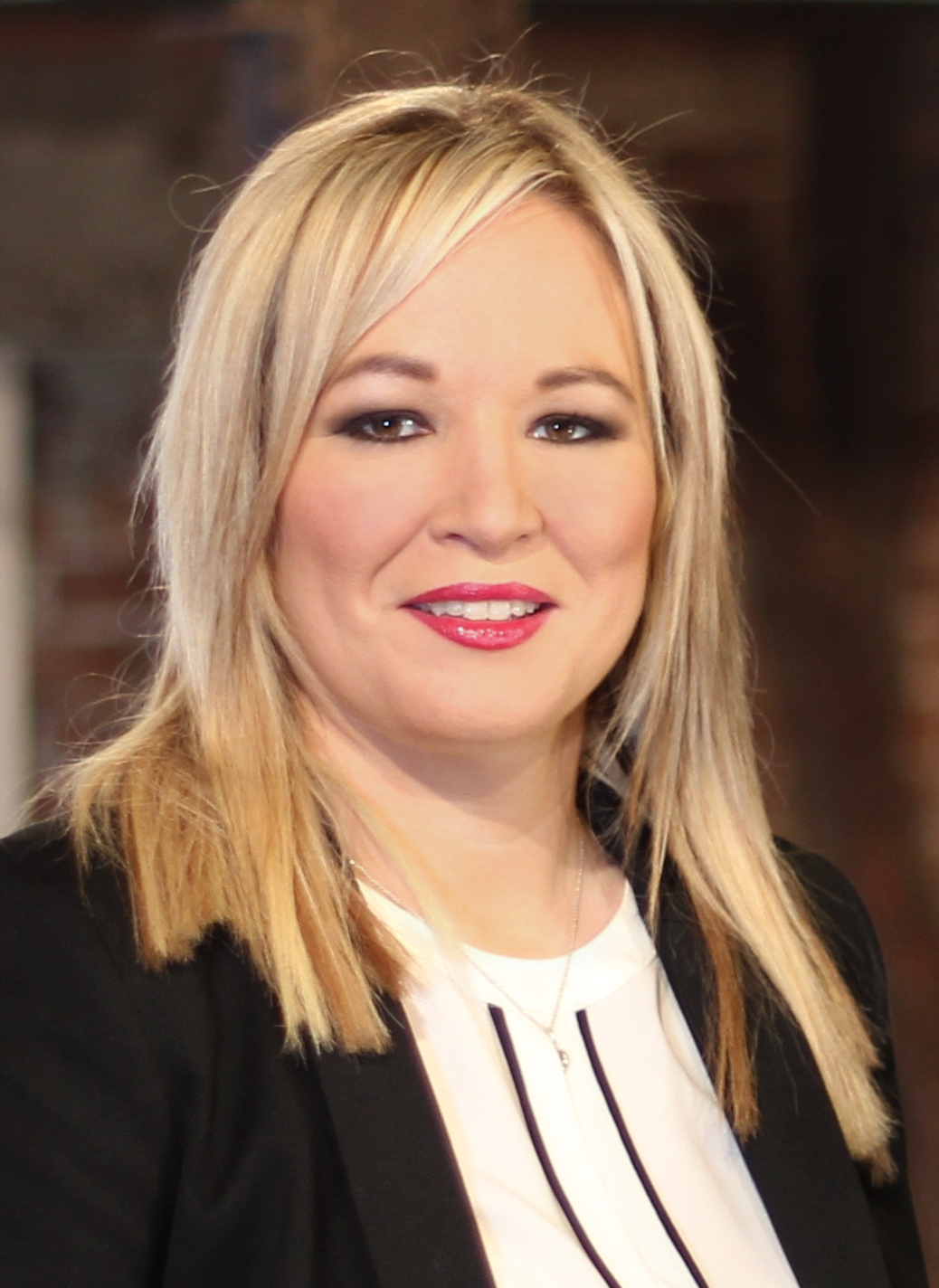

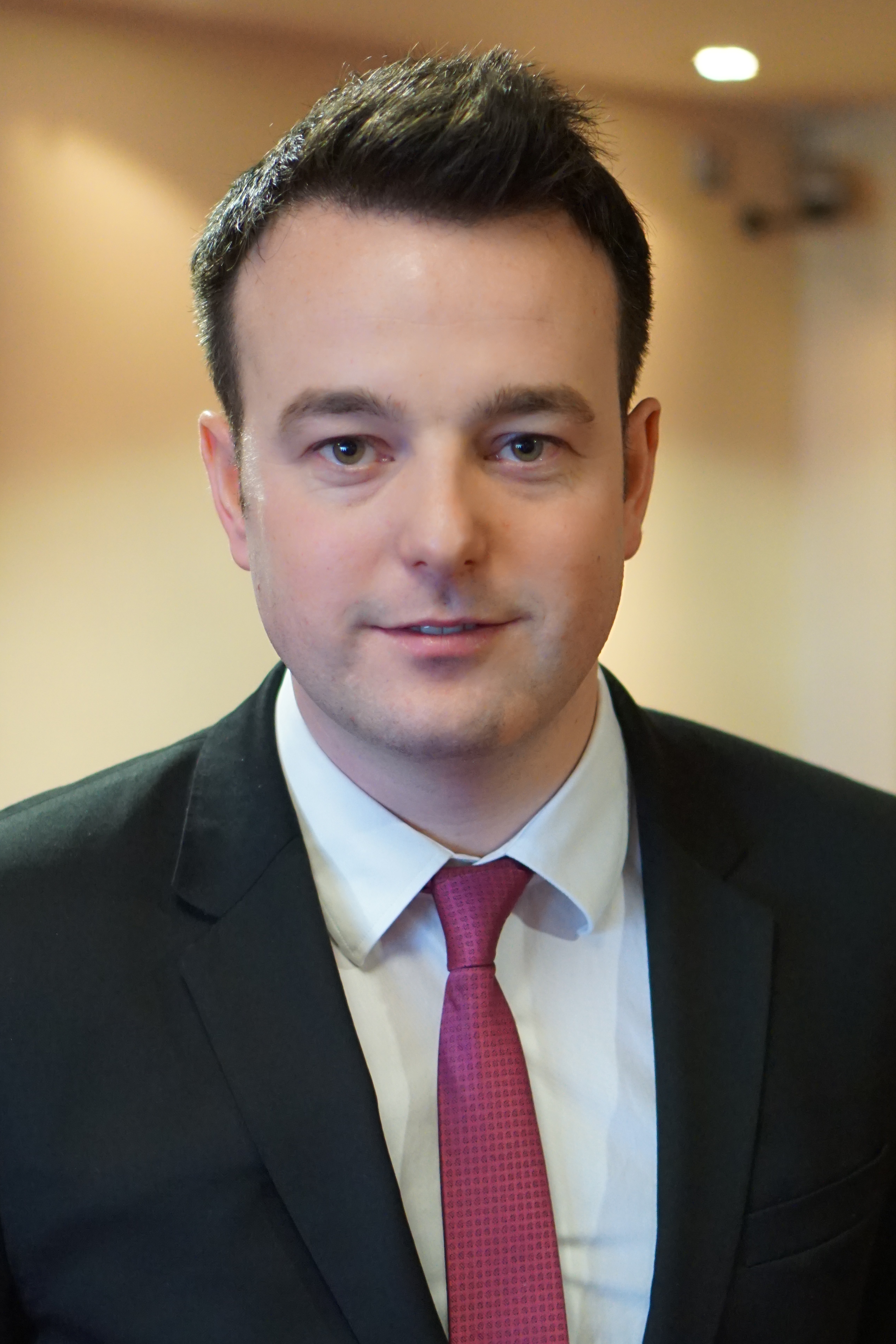

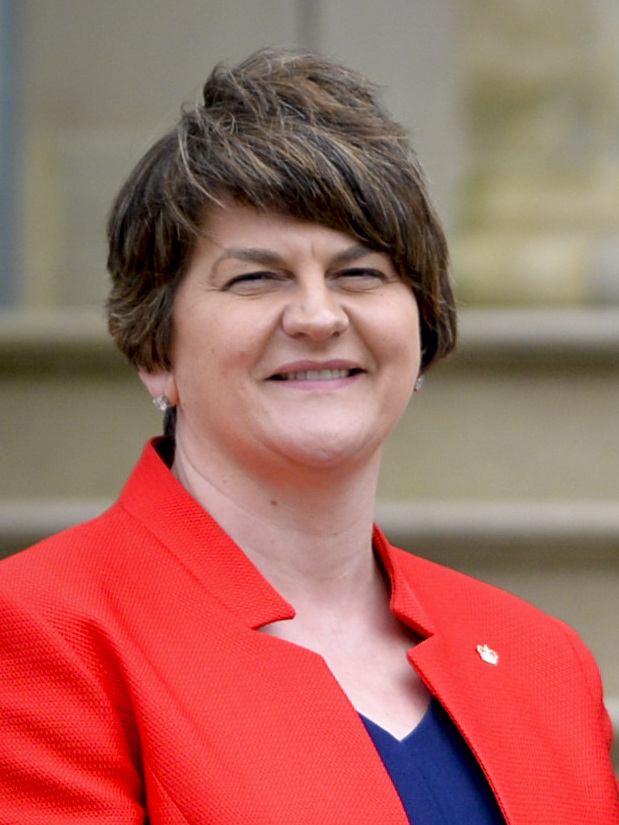

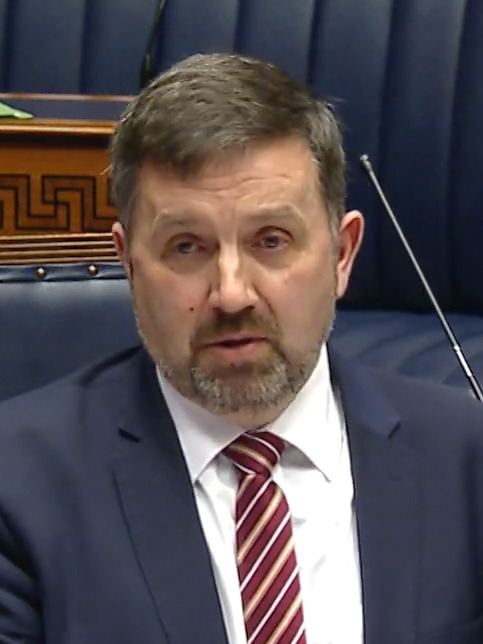

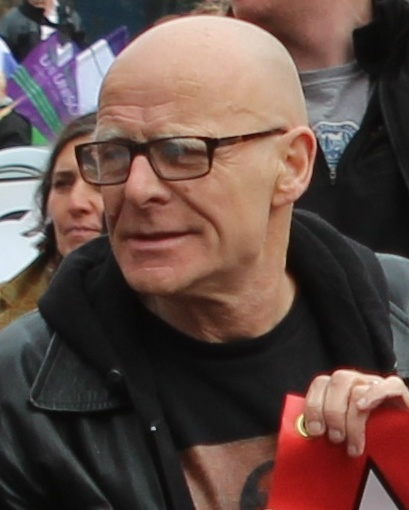

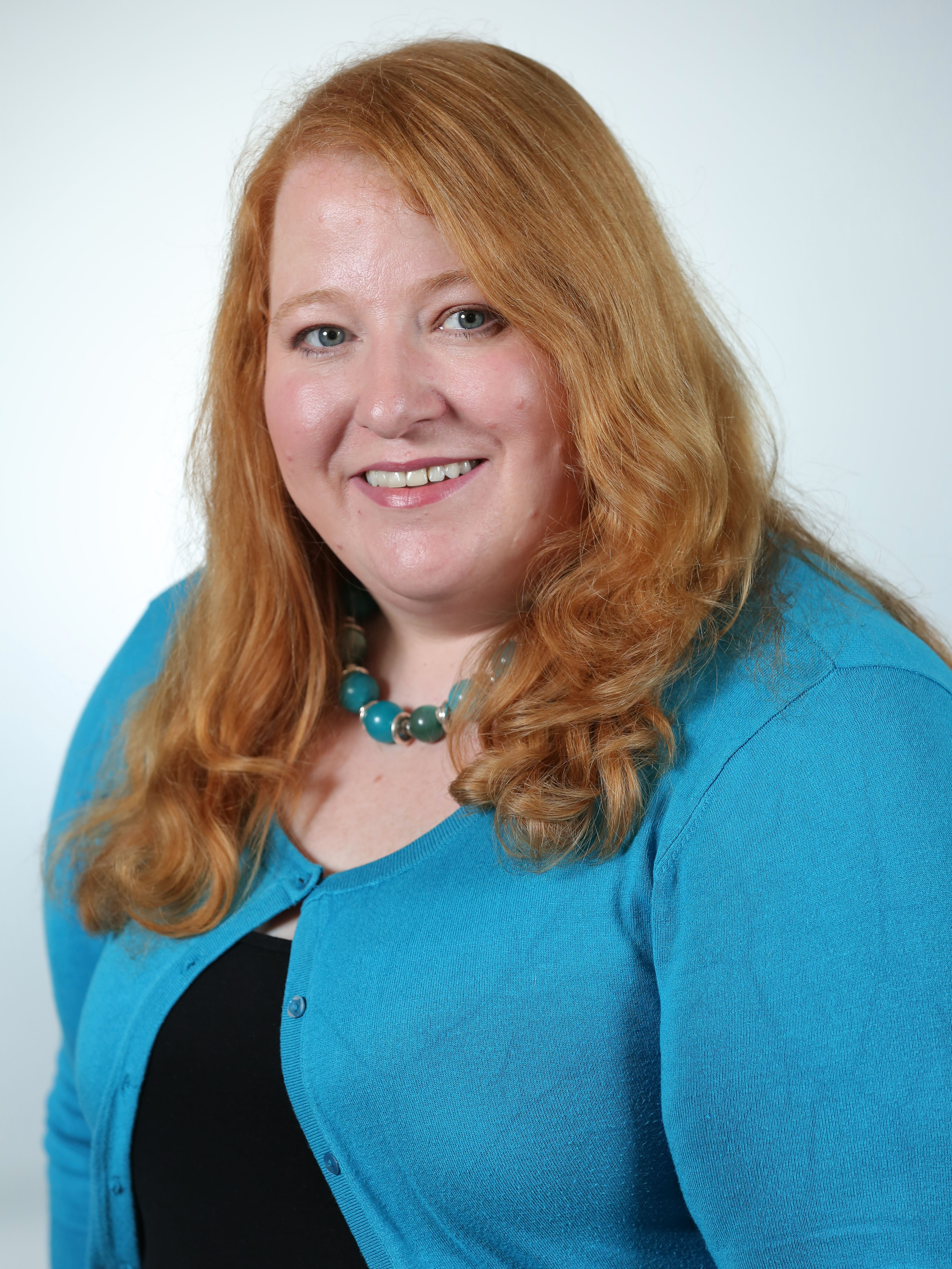

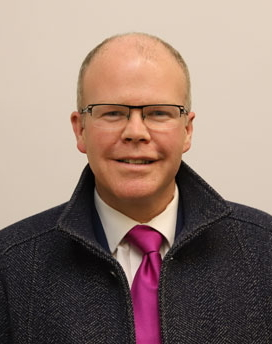
	First party	Second party	Third party
Leader	Michelle O'Neill (Note: The leader of Sinn Féin is Mary Lou McDonald, who sits as a TD in the Irish Dáil Éireann for Dublin Central. O'Neill is the leader of the party in Northern Ireland.)	Colum Eastwood	Arlene Foster
Party	Sinn Féin	SDLP	DUP
Seats before	16	8	8
Seats won	11	11	7
Seat change	▼5	▲3	▼1
Popular vote	17,062	15,458	8,923
Percentage	28.1%	25.5%	14.7%
Swing	▼8.0 pp	▼0.1 pp	▼0.7 pp
	Fourth party	Fifth party	Sixth party
Leader		Robin Swann	Eamonn McCann
Party	Independent	UUP	People Before Profit
Seats before	4	2	0
Seats won	4	2	2
Seat change	Steady	Steady	▲2
Popular vote	7,652	4,126	3,590
Percentage	12.6%	6.8%	5.9%
Swing	▲2.0 pp	▼0.8 pp	▲5.5 pp
	Seventh party	Eighth party
Leader	Naomi Long	Peadar Tóibín
Party	Alliance	Aontú
Seats before	0	0
Seats won	2	1
Seat change	▲2	▲1
Popular vote	2,852	1,032
Percentage	4.7%	1.7%
Swing	▲3.1 pp	New
- Derry and Strabane 2019 Council Election Results by DEA (Shaded by plurality of FPVs)
Council control before election
No overall control
Council control after election
No overall control

The 2019 election to the Derry City and Strabane District Council, part of the Northern Ireland local elections on 2 May 2019, returned 40 members to the council via Single Transferable Vote.

== Election results ==
Derry City and Strabane District Council Election Result 2019
Party	Seats	Gains	Losses	Net gain/loss	Seats %	Votes %	Votes	+/−
Sinn Féin	11	0	5	▼5	27.5	28.1	17,062	▼8.0
SDLP	11	2	1	▲1	27.5	25.5	15,458	▼0.1
DUP	6	0	1	▼1	15.0	14.7	8,923	▼0.7
Independent	4	1	1	0	10.0	12.6	7,652	▲2.0
UUP	2	0	0	0	5.0	6.8	4,126	▼0.8
People Before Profit	2	2	0	▲2	5.0	5.9	3,590	▲5.5
Alliance	2	2	0	▲2	5.0	4.7	2,852	▲3.1
Aontú	1	1	0	▲1	2.5	1.7	1,032	New

Note: "Votes" are the first preference votes.

The overall turnout was 56.21% with a total of 60,695 valid votes cast. A total of 1,103 ballots were rejected.

== Districts summary ==
Results of the Derry and Strabane District Council election, 2019 by district
Ward	%	Cllrs	%	Cllrs	%	Cllrs	%	Cllrs	%	Cllrs	%	Cllrs	%	Cllrs	Total Cllrs
Ward	Sinn Féin		SDLP		DUP		UUP		PBP		Alliance		Others		Total Cllrs
Ballyarnett	30.7	2	39.7	3	0.0	0	0.0	0	8.6	0	3.6	0	17.5	1	6
Derg	37.0	2	12.9	1	23.3	1	15.8	1	0.0	0	1.9	0	9.2	0	6
Faughan	16.5	1	24.5	1	27.9	2	9.9	0	0.0	0	11.0	1	10.3	0	5
Foyleside	29.5	1	41.9	2	0.0	0	0.0	0	11.3	1	4.1	0	11.2	1	5
Sperrin	31.0	2	14.9	1	18.8	2	5.1	0	0.0	0	4.0	0	26.1	2	7
The Moor	36.4	2	22.6	1	1.9	0	0.0	0	13.4	1	1.6	0	24.1	1	5
Waterside	16.2	1	24.3	2	28.8	2	16.0	1	7.6	0	7.2	1	0.0	0	7
Total	28.1	11	25.5	11	14.7	7	6.8	2	5.9	2	4.7	2	14.3	5	40

== District results ==
=== Ballyarnett ===
2014: 3 x Sinn Féin, 2 x SDLP, 1 x Independent
2019: 3 x SDLP, 2 x Sinn Féin, 1 x Aontú
2014-2019 Change: SDLP and Aontú gain from Sinn Féin and Independent

Ballyarnett - 6 seats
Party	Candidate	FPv%	Count					
Party	Candidate	FPv%	1	2	3	4	5	6
SDLP	Angela Dobbins*	14.54%	1,392					
SDLP	Brian Tierney*	12.90%	1,235	1,282	1,299	1,410		
Sinn Féin	Aileen Mellon* ††	8.86%	848	851	953	996	1,001.1	1,505.1
Sinn Féin	Sandra Duffy*	9.39%	899	905	992	1,005	1,006.02	1,368.02
SDLP	Rory Farrell	12.22%	1,170	1,255	1,270	1,325	1,343.36	1,366.87
Aontú	Anne McCloskey †	10.78%	1,032	1,068	1,086	1,283	1,290.14	1,306.14
People Before Profit	Nuala Crilly	8.63%	826	919	927	1,046	1,053.65	1,068.65
Sinn Féin	Caoimhe McKnight*	6.85%	656	664	943	949	951.04	
Independent	Warren Robinson*	6.67%	639	662	672			
Sinn Féin	Neil McLaughlin	5.62%	538	545				
Alliance	Danny McCloskey	3.55%	340					
Electorate: 17,425 Valid: 9,575 (54.95%) Spoilt: 199 Quota: 1,368 Turnout: 9,774 (56.09%)

=== Derg ===
2014: 3 x Sinn Féin, 1 x DUP, 1 x UUP
2019: 2 x Sinn Féin, 1 x DUP, 1 x UUP, 1 x SDLP
2014-2019 Change: SDLP gain from Sinn Féin

Derg - 5 seats
Party	Candidate	FPv%	Count				
Party	Candidate	FPv%	1	2	3	4	5
DUP	Keith Kerrigan	13.62%	1,090	1,092	1,711		
UUP	Derek Hussey* –††‡	15.83%	1,267	1,279	1,418		
Sinn Féin	Ruairí McHugh*	13.57%	1,086	1,089	1,089	1,089	1,579
SDLP	Cara Hunter †	12.89%	1,032	1,092	1,094	1,194	1,287
Sinn Féin	Kieran McGuire*	13.43%	1,075	1,081	1,081	1,081	1,232
Independent	Andy Patton	9.18%	735	784	791	922	981
Sinn Féin	Maolíosa McHugh*	9.97%	798	806	807	808	
DUP	Thomas Kerrigan*	9.63%	771	773			
Alliance	Anne Murray	1.87%	150				
Electorate: 12,996 Valid: 8,004 (61.59%) Spoilt: 116 Quota: 1,335 Turnout: 8,120 (62.48%)

=== Faughan ===
2014: 2 x DUP, 2 x SDLP, 1 x Sinn Féin
2019: 2 x DUP, 1 x SDLP, 1 x Sinn Féin, 1 x Alliance
2014-2019 Change: Alliance gain from SDLP

Faughan - 5 seats
Party	Candidate	FPv%	Count						
Party	Candidate	FPv%	1	2	3	4	5	6	7
DUP	Graham Warke* ‡	14.70%	1,050	1,050	1,051	1,253			
DUP	Ryan McCready ‡	13.16%	940	940	942	1,225			
SDLP	Jim McKeever* ‡†	7.91%	565	577	868	905	919.3	926.43	1,410.43
Sinn Féin	Paul Fleming* †	11.96%	854	1,116	1,140	1,140	1,140.65	1,140.88	1,200.88
Alliance	Rachael Ferguson	10.96%	783	795	859	965	996.85	1,012.49	1,148.43
Independent	Paul Thomas Hughes	10.26%	733	737	782	807	816.75	821.12	865
SDLP	Brenda Stevenson	9.70%	693	717	767	784	789.2	794.49	
UUP	William Jamieson	9.94%	710	710	715				
SDLP	Gus Hastings*	6.87%	491	498					
Sinn Féin	Conor Heaney	4.54%	324						
Electorate: 13,601 Valid: 7,143 (52.52%) Spoilt: 103 Quota: 1,191 Turnout: 7,246 (53.28%)

=== Foyleside ===
2014: 2 x SDLP, 2 x Sinn Féin, 1 x Independent
2019: 2 x SDLP, 1 x Sinn Féin, 1 x People Before Profit, 1 x Independent
2014-2019 Change: People Before Profit gain from Sinn Féin

Foyleside - 5 seats
Party	Candidate	FPv%	Count				
Party	Candidate	FPv%	1	2	3	4	5
SDLP	Mary Durkan †	16.73%	1,231				
SDLP	Shauna Cusack*	15.34%	1,129	1,209	1,243		
People Before Profit	Shaun Harkin	13.28%	977	1,058	1,078	1,259	
Sinn Féin	Michael Cooper* †	12.07%	888	897	1,151	1,206	1,208.34
Independent	Sean Carr	11.17%	822	854	870	1,014	1,038.96
Sinn Féin	Eric McGinley*	8.87%	653	661	972	1,016	1,020.29
SDLP	Lilian Seenoi-Barr	9.80%	721	775	777		
Sinn Féin	Hayleigh Fleming	8.60%	632	644			
Alliance	John Doherty	4.16%	305				
Electorate: 13,233 Valid: 7,358 (55.60%) Spoilt: 162 Quota: 1,227 Turnout: 7,520 (56.83%)

=== Sperrin ===
2014: 3 x Sinn Féin, 2 x DUP, 1 x SDLP, 1 x Independent
2019: 2 x Sinn Féin, 2 x DUP, 2 x Independent, 1 x SDLP
2014-2019 Change: Independent gain from Sinn Féin

Sperrin - 7 seats
Party	Candidate	FPv%	Count								
Party	Candidate	FPv%	1	2	3	4	5	6	7	8	9
DUP	Allan Bresland*	10.59%	1,156	1,158	1,173	1,415					
Sinn Féin	Michaela Boyle	10.57%	1,153	1,165	1,187	1,188	1,188	1,238	1,320	1,864	
Sinn Féin	Dan Kelly*	6.93%	756	765	777	778	778	862	1,347	1,395	
Independent	Paul Gallagher*	10.14%	1,106	1,123	1,148	1,151	1,151	1,225	1,230	1,278	1,340
Independent	Raymond Barr	8.43%	920	943	983	993	993	1,099	1,105	1,183	1,287
DUP	Maurice Devenney	8.24%	899	900	909	1,129	1,177.4	1,230.06	1,230.06	1,230.06	1,231.06
SDLP	Jason Barr	7.63%	832	862	932	963	963	1,059	1,079	1,130	1,171
SDLP	Steven Edwards	7.28%	794	822	885	914	914.22	1,029.22	1,064	1,095.22	1,112.22
Sinn Féin	Brian McMahon*	6.70%	731	731	751	751	751	804	951		
Sinn Féin	Cathal Ó hOisín	6.78%	740	772	790	790	790	802			
Independent	Patsy Kelly*	5.45%	595	624	692	734	734.66				
UUP	Andy McKane	5.13%	530	562	621						
Alliance	Scott Moore	4.01%	437	463							
Independent	Pauline McHenry	1.17%	128								
Independent	Corey French	0.95%	104								
Electorate: 18,048 Valid: 10,911 (60.46%) Spoilt: 176 Quota: 1,364 Turnout: 11,087 (61.43%)

=== The Moor ===
2014: 3 x Sinn Féin, 1 x SDLP, 1 x Independent
2019: 2 x Sinn Féin, 1 x SDLP, 1 x People Before Profit, 1 x Independent
2014-2019 Change: People Before Profit gain from Sinn Féin

The Moor - 5 seats
Party	Candidate	FPv%	Count					
Party	Candidate	FPv%	1	2	3	4	5	6
Independent	Gary Donnelly*	17.73%	1,374					
People Before Profit	Eamonn McCann †	13.36%	1,035	1,053.76	1,106.04	1,271.66	1,301.66	
Sinn Féin	Tina Burke †	9.53%	738	741.15	746.15	765.29	1,111.5	1,581.5
SDLP	John Boyle	13.96%	1,082	1,084.8	1,148.8	1,224.83	1,234.04	1,289.32
Sinn Féin	Patricia Logue*	10.04%	778	780.59	782.59	812.5	969.76	1,140.16
SDLP	Cathy Breslin	8.63%	669	679.71	712.78	787.47	798.61	840.31
Sinn Féin	Kevin Campbell*	9.19%	712	715.78	719.78	735.34	784.48	
Sinn Féin	Sharon Duddy*	7.67%	594	595.47	601.47	614.45		
Independent	Emmet Doyle	6.40%	496	530.16	553.44			
DUP	Niree McMorris	1.91%	148	148				
Alliance	Colm Cavanagh	1.57%	122	122.77				
Electorate: 13,114 Valid: 7,748 (59.08%) Spoilt: 169 Quota: 1,292 Turnout: 7,917 (60.37%)

=== Waterside ===
2014: 3 x DUP, 2 x SDLP, 1 x Sinn Féin, 1 x UUP
2019: 2 x DUP, 2 x SDLP, 1 x Sinn Féin, 1 x UUP, 1 x Alliance
2014-2019 Change: Alliance gain from DUP

Waterside - 7 seats
Party	Candidate	FPv%	Count							
Party	Candidate	FPv%	1	2	3	4	5	6	7	8
UUP	Darren Guy	15.96%	1,589							
SDLP	Sinead McLaughlin †	14.90%	1,483							
DUP	Hilary McClintock* †	12.56%	1,250							
SDLP	Martin Reilly*	9.43%	939	966.37	1,158.69	1,158.69	1,395.69			
Sinn Féin	Christopher Jackson*	8.29%	825	826.15	865.43	865.43	918.07	935	1,685.07	
Alliance	Philip McKinney	7.18%	715	772.5	783.7	783.7	1,046.17	1,126.17	1,166.76	1,275.76
DUP	David Ramsey* †	8.43%	839	957.68	958.64	958.64	969.87	971.87	974.1	975.1
DUP	Drew Thompson*	7.83%	780	889.02	889.18	889.18	903.71	904.71	906.71	910.71
Sinn Féin	Sharon McLaughlin	7.87%	784	784.23	792.87	792.87	843.38	871.38		
People Before Profit	Maeve O'Neill	7.55%	752	770.86	782.7	782.7				
Electorate: 19,558 Valid: 9,956 (50.91%) Spoilt: 178 Quota: 1,245 Turnout: 10,134 (51.82%)

== Changes during the term ==
=== † Co-options ===
Date	Electoral Area	Party	Outgoing	Co-optee	Reason
13 August 2019	Derg	UUP	Derek Hussey	Andrew McKane	Hussey suspended.
28 February 2020	Waterside	SDLP	Sinead McLaughlin	Sean Mooney	McLaughlin was co-opted to the Northern Ireland Assembly.
1 June 2020	Derg	SDLP	Cara Hunter	Steven Edwards	Hunter was co-opted to the Northern Ireland Assembly.
1 November 2020	Derg	UUP	Andrew McKane	Derek Hussey	McKane resigned.
11 November 2020	Ballyarnett	Aontú	Anne McCloskey	Emmet Doyle	McCloskey resigned.
22 March 2021	The Moor	People Before Profit	Eamonn McCann	Maeve O'Neill	McCann resigned.
8 April 2021	Foyleside	Sinn Féin	Michael Cooper	Conor Heaney	Cooper resigned.
9 June 2021	Foyleside	SDLP	Mary Durkan	Lilian Seenoi Barr	Durkan resigned.
19 July 2021	Ballyarnett	Sinn Féin	Aileen Mellon	Damien Mullan	Mellon resigned.
3 August 2021	The Moor	Sinn Féin	Tina Burke	Emma McGinley	Burke resigned.
24 November 2021	Ballyarnett	Sinn Féin	Damien Mullan	John McGowan	Mullan resigned.
9 June 2022	Waterside	DUP	Hilary McClintock	Drew Thompson	McClintock resigned.
31 October 2022	Faughan	SDLP	Jim McKeever (Ind.)	Declan Norris	McKeever resigned after being expelled from the SDLP.
1 December 2022	Waterside	DUP	David Ramsey	Niree McMorris	Ramsey resigned.
19 December 2022	Faughan	Sinn Féin	Paul Fleming	Alex Duffy	Fleming resigned.

=== ‡ Changes in affiliation ===
Date	Electoral Area	Name	Previous affiliation	New affiliation	Circumstance
13 June 2021	Faughan	Ryan McCready	DUP	Independent	Resigned from the DUP over disagreements with the new party leadership.
5 July 2021	Faughan	Ryan McCready	Independent	UUP	Joined the UUP having recently left the DUP.
26 January 2022	Derg	Derek Hussey	UUP	Independent	Suspended from the UUP over criticising the party's Assembly candidate selection process in West Tyrone.
15 July 2021	Faughan	Jim McKeever	SDLP	Independent	Suspended from the SDLP after being charged with a number of offenses.
6 June 2022	Faughan	Graham Warke	DUP	Independent	Decided to sit on the council as an Independent.
31 October 2022	Faughan	Vacant	Independent	SDLP	McKeever's seat returned to SDLP.

=== – Suspensions ===
Derek Hussey (UUP) was suspended from the council for fifteen months from 16 July 2019. During his suspension he resigned from council and was replaced by Andy McKane who resigned at the end of the fifteen months for Hussey to return.

Last updated 20 December 2022.

Current composition: see Derry City and Strabane District Council
