= Ballyarnett (District Electoral Area) =

District electoral area in Northern Ireland

- Derry and Strabane District Council DEA constituency

Current constituency
- Created: 2014
- Seats: 6 (2014-)
- Councillors: Amanda Clarke (SF); Sandra Duffy (SF); Rory Farrell (SDLP); Catherine McDaid (SDLP); Pat Murphy (SF); Brian Tierney (SDLP)

Ballyarnett DEA within Derry City and Strabane

Ballyarnett is one of the seven district electoral areas (DEA) in Derry and Strabane, Northern Ireland. The district elects six members to Derry and Strabane District Council and contains the wards of Carn Hill, Culmore, Galliagh, Shantallow, Shantallow East and Skeoge. Ballyarnett forms part of the Foyle constituencies for the Northern Ireland Assembly and UK Parliament.

It was created for the 2014 local elections, replacing the Shantallow DEA which had existed since 1985.

== Councillors ==
Election	Councillor (Party)	Councillor (Party)	Councillor (Party)	Councillor (Party)	Councillor (Party)	Councillor (Party)
February 2024 Co-Option	Sandra Duffy (Sinn Féin)	Amanda Clarke (Sinn Féin)	Pat Murphy (Sinn Féin)	Rory Farrell (SDLP)	Brian Tierney (SDLP)	Catherine McDaid (SDLP)
2023	Sandra Duffy (Sinn Féin)	John McGowan (Sinn Féin)	Pat Murphy (Sinn Féin)	Rory Farrell (SDLP)	Brian Tierney (SDLP)	Catherine McDaid (SDLP)
November 2021 Co-Option	Sandra Duffy (Sinn Féin)	John McGowan (Sinn Féin)	Emmet Doyle (Aontú)	Rory Farrell (SDLP)	Brian Tierney (SDLP)	Angela Dobbins (SDLP)
July 2021 Co-Option	Sandra Duffy (Sinn Féin)	Damien Mullan (Sinn Féin)	Emmet Doyle (Aontú)	Rory Farrell (SDLP)	Brian Tierney (SDLP)	Angela Dobbins (SDLP)
November 2020 Co-Option	Sandra Duffy (Sinn Féin)	Aileen Mellon (Sinn Féin)	Emmet Doyle (Aontú)	Rory Farrell (SDLP)	Brian Tierney (SDLP)	Angela Dobbins (SDLP)
2019	Sandra Duffy (Sinn Féin)	Aileen Mellon (Sinn Féin)	Anne McCloskey (Aontú)	Rory Farrell (SDLP)	Brian Tierney (SDLP)	Angela Dobbins (SDLP)
November 2018 Co-Option	Sandra Duffy (Sinn Féin)	Aileen Mellon (Sinn Féin)	Caoimhe McKnight (Sinn Féin)	Warren Robinson (Independent)	Brian Tierney (SDLP)	Angela Dobbins (SDLP)
March 2018 Co-Option	Sandra Duffy (Sinn Féin)	Conchúr McCauley (Sinn Féin)	Caoimhe McKnight (Sinn Féin)	Warren Robinson (Independent)	Brian Tierney (SDLP)	Angela Dobbins (SDLP)
March 2017 Co-Option	Sandra Duffy (Sinn Féin)	Tony Hassan (Sinn Féin)	Caoimhe McKnight (Sinn Féin)	Warren Robinson (Independent)	Brian Tierney (SDLP)	Angela Dobbins (SDLP)
September 2015 Co-Option	Sandra Duffy (Sinn Féin)	Tony Hassan (Sinn Féin)	Elisha McCallion (Sinn Féin)	Warren Robinson (Independent)	Brian Tierney (SDLP)	Angela Dobbins (SDLP)
2014	Sandra Duffy (Sinn Féin)	Tony Hassan (Sinn Féin)	Elisha McCallion (Sinn Féin)	Dermot Quigley (Independent)	Brian Tierney (SDLP)	Angela Dobbins (SDLP)

== 2023 Election ==
2019: 3 x SDLP, 2 x Sinn Féin, 1 x Aontú

2023: 3 x Sinn Féin, 3 x SDLP

2019–2023 Change: Sinn Féin gain from Aontú

Ballyarnett - 6 seats
Party	Candidate	FPv%	Count					
Party	Candidate	FPv%	1	2	3	4	5	6
Sinn Féin	Sandra Duffy*	22.22%	2,164					
SDLP	Rory Farrell*	14.43%	1,405					
Sinn Féin	John McGowan* †	13.34%	1,299	1,601.05				
Sinn Féin	Pat Murphy	9.86%	960	1,256.10	1,289.65	1,474.93		
SDLP	Brian Tierney*	10.33%	1,006	1,057.80	1,128.50	1,136.42	1,165.70	1,338.70
SDLP	Catherine McDaid	8.79%	856	896.25	1,052.80	1,059.04	1,086.40	1,318.40
Aontú	Emmet Doyle*	9.11%	887	909.40	944.45	945.89	955.73	1,147.73
People Before Profit	Damien Doherty	7.46%	727	745.20	852.45	855.33	869.25	
Alliance	Colm Cavanagh	4.48%	436	457.35				
Electorate: 19,139 Valid: 9,740 (50.89%) Spoilt: 189 Quota: 1,392 Turnout: 9.929 (51.88%)

== 2019 Election ==
2014: 3 x Sinn Féin, 2 x SDLP, 1 x Independent

2019: 3 x SDLP, 2 x Sinn Féin, 1 x Aontú

2014-2019 Change: SDLP and Aontú gain from Sinn Féin and Independent

Ballyarnett - 6 seats
Party	Candidate	FPv%	Count					
Party	Candidate	FPv%	1	2	3	4	5	6
SDLP	Angela Dobbins*	14.54%	1,392					
SDLP	Brian Tierney*	12.90%	1,235	1,282	1,299	1,410		
Sinn Féin	Aileen Mellon* ††	8.86%	848	851	953	996	1,001.1	1,505.1
Sinn Féin	Sandra Duffy*	9.39%	899	905	992	1,005	1,006.02	1,368.02
SDLP	Rory Farrell	12.22%	1,170	1,255	1,270	1,325	1,343.36	1,366.87
Aontú	Anne McCloskey †	10.78%	1,032	1,068	1,086	1,283	1,290.14	1,306.14
People Before Profit	Nuala Crilly	8.63%	826	919	927	1,046	1,053.65	1,068.65
Sinn Féin	Caoimhe McKnight*	6.85%	656	664	943	949	951.04	
Independent	Warren Robinson*	6.67%	639	662	672			
Sinn Féin	Neil McLaughlin	5.62%	538	545				
Alliance	Danny McCloskey	3.55%	340					
Electorate: 17,425 Valid: 9,575 (54.95%) Spoilt: 199 Quota: 1,368 Turnout: 9,774 (56.09%)

== 2014 Election ==
2014: 3 x Sinn Féin, 2 x SDLP, 1 x Independent

Ballyarnett - 6 seats
Party	Candidate	FPv%	Count				
Party	Candidate	FPv%	1	2	3	4	5
Sinn Féin	Sandra Duffy	15.12%	1,163				
SDLP	Angela Dobbins*	15.02%	1,155	1,155			
Sinn Féin	Tony Hassan* †	14.20%	1,092	1,101	1,101		
SDLP	Brian Tierney*	12.52%	963	975	976	983.9	1,423.9
Independent	Dermot Quigley †	13.49%	1,037	1,069	1,070.45	1,072.65	1,105.65
Sinn Féin	Elisha McCallion* †	12.81%	985	992	1,044.15	1,046.45	1,062.45
SDLP	Jimmy Carr*	7.87%	605	621	622.35	633.05	690.05
SDLP	Colm O'Connor	7.17%	551	586	586.7	617.15	
Alliance	Danny McCloskey	1.81%	139				
Electorate: 15,987 Valid: 7,690 (48.10%) Spoilt: 174 Quota: 1,099 Turnout: 7,864 (49.19%)
