= Foyleside (District Electoral Area) =

District electoral area in Northern Ireland

- Derry and Strabane District Council DEA constituency

Current constituency
- Created: 2014
- Seats: 5 (2014-)
- Councillors: Shauna Cusack (IND); Shaun Harkin (PBP); Conor Heaney (SF); Lilian Seenoi-Barr (SDLP); Grace Uí Niallais (SF)

Foyleside DEA within Derry City and Strabane

Foyleside is one of the seven district electoral areas (DEA) in Derry and Strabane, Northern Ireland. The district elects five members to Derry and Strabane District Council and contains the wards of Ballymagroaty, Foyle Springs, Madam's Bank, Northland and Springtown. Ballyarnett forms part of the Foyle constituencies for the Northern Ireland Assembly and UK Parliament.

It was created for the 2014 local elections, replacing the Northland DEA which had existed since 1985.

== Councillors ==
Election	Councillor (Party)	Councillor (Party)	Councillor (Party)	Councillor (Party)	Councillor (Party)
May 2024 Defection	Conor Heaney (Sinn Féin)	Grace Uí Niallais (Sinn Féin)	Shaun Harkin (PBP)	Lilian Seenoi-Barr (SDLP)	Shauna Cusack (SDLP)/ (Independent)
2023	Conor Heaney (Sinn Féin)	Grace Uí Niallais (Sinn Féin)	Shaun Harkin (PBP)	Lilian Seenoi-Barr (SDLP)	Shauna Cusack (SDLP)/ (Independent)
June 2021 Co-Option	Conor Heaney (Sinn Féin)	Sean Carr (Independent)	Shaun Harkin (PBP)	Lilian Seenoi-Barr (SDLP)	Shauna Cusack (SDLP)/ (Independent)
April 2021 Co-Option	Conor Heaney (Sinn Féin)	Sean Carr (Independent)	Shaun Harkin (PBP)	Mary Durkan (SDLP)	Shauna Cusack (SDLP)/ (Independent)
2019	Michael Cooper (Sinn Féin)	Sean Carr (Independent)	Shaun Harkin (PBP)	Mary Durkan (SDLP)	Shauna Cusack (SDLP)/ (Independent)
2014	Michael Cooper (Sinn Féin)	Eric McGinley (Sinn Féin)	Darren O'Reilly (Independent)	John Boyle (SDLP)	Shauna Cusack (SDLP)/ (Independent)

== 2023 Election ==
2019: 2 x SDLP, 1 x Sinn Féin, 1 x People Before Profit, 1 x Independent

2023: 2 x Sinn Féin, 2 x SDLP, 1 x People Before Profit,

2019–2023 Change: Sinn Féin gain from Independent

Foyleside - 5 seats
Party	Candidate	FPv%	Count				
Party	Candidate	FPv%	1	2	3	4	5
Sinn Féin	Conor Heaney*	25.77%	1,846				
Sinn Féin	Grace Uí Niallais	15.57%	1,115	1,635.80			
People Before Profit	Shaun Harkin*	13.67%	979	999.65	1,074.90	1,140.15	1,239.15
SDLP	Shauna Cusack* ‡	13.23%	948	984.75	1,072.25	1,131.35	1,200.35
SDLP	Lilian Seenoi-Barr*	13.40%	960	988.00	1,073.40	1,130.30	1,177.30
SDLP	Stephen McCallion	8.74%	626	638.60	672.55	734.70	777.70
Aontú	Seán Mac Cearáin	5.91%	423	434.55	472.70	493.50	
Alliance	Danny McCloskey	3.71%	266	275.45	307.30		
Electorate: 13,372 Valid: 7,163 (53.57%) Spoilt: 136 Quota: 1,194 Turnout: 7,299 (54.58%)

== 2019 Election ==
2014: 2 x SDLP, 2 x Sinn Féin, 1 x Independent

2019: 2 x SDLP, 1 x Sinn Féin, 1 x People Before Profit, 1 x Independent

2014-2019 Change: People Before Profit gain from Sinn Féin

Foyleside - 5 seats
Party	Candidate	FPv%	Count				
Party	Candidate	FPv%	1	2	3	4	5
SDLP	Mary Durkan †	16.73%	1,231				
SDLP	Shauna Cusack*	15.34%	1,129	1,209	1,243		
People Before Profit	Shaun Harkin	13.28%	977	1,058	1,078	1,259	
Sinn Féin	Michael Cooper* †	12.07%	888	897	1,151	1,206	1,208.34
Independent	Sean Carr	11.17%	822	854	870	1,014	1,038.96
Sinn Féin	Eric McGinley*	8.87%	653	661	972	1,016	1,020.29
SDLP	Lilian Seenoi-Barr	9.80%	721	775	777		
Sinn Féin	Hayleigh Fleming	8.60%	632	644			
Alliance	John Doherty	4.16%	305				
Electorate: 13,233 Valid: 7,358 (55.60%) Spoilt: 162 Quota: 1,227 Turnout: 7,520 (56.83%)

== 2014 Election ==
2014: 2 x SDLP, 2 x Sinn Féin, 1 x Independent

Foyleside - 5 seats
Party	Candidate	FPv%	Count				
Party	Candidate	FPv%	1	2	3	4	5
SDLP	John Boyle*	17.78%	1,132				
Independent	Darren O'Reilly	17.13%	1,091				
Sinn Féin	Michael Cooper*	12.58%	801	843	847.74	1,154.74	
Sinn Féin	Eric McGinley*	12.42%	791	817	818.68	1,124.68	
SDLP	Shauna Cusack*	11.62%	740	842	894.14	943.62	975.62
SDLP	Rory Farrell	11.67%	743	804	809.4	827.52	841.52
Sinn Féin	Barney O'Hagan*	11.01%	701	722	723.14		
People Before Profit	Sha Gillespie	3.64%	232				
Alliance	Daniel Comer	2.15%	137				
Electorate: 12,724 Valid: 6,368 (50.05%) Spoilt: 171 Quota: 1,062 Turnout: 6,539 (51.39%)
