= Derry City and Strabane District Council =

Local authority in Northern Ireland

Derry City and Strabane District Council Comhairle Chathair Dhoire agus Cheantar an tSratha Báin Derry Cittie & Stràbane Destrìck Cooncil

Type
- Type: District council of Derry and Strabane

History
- Founded: 1 April 2015
- Preceded by: Derry City Council; Strabane District Council

Leadership
- Mayor: Grace Uí Niallais, SF
- Deputy Mayor: Catherine McDaid, SDLP

Structure
- Seats: 40
- Graph of the party split among 40 seats.
- Political groups: All parties (40) Sinn Féin (18) SDLP (8) DUP (5) UUP (3) People Before Profit (1) Independent (5)
- Length of term: 4 years

Elections
- Voting system: Single transferable vote
- Last election: 18 May 2023
- Next election: 6 May 2027

Meeting place
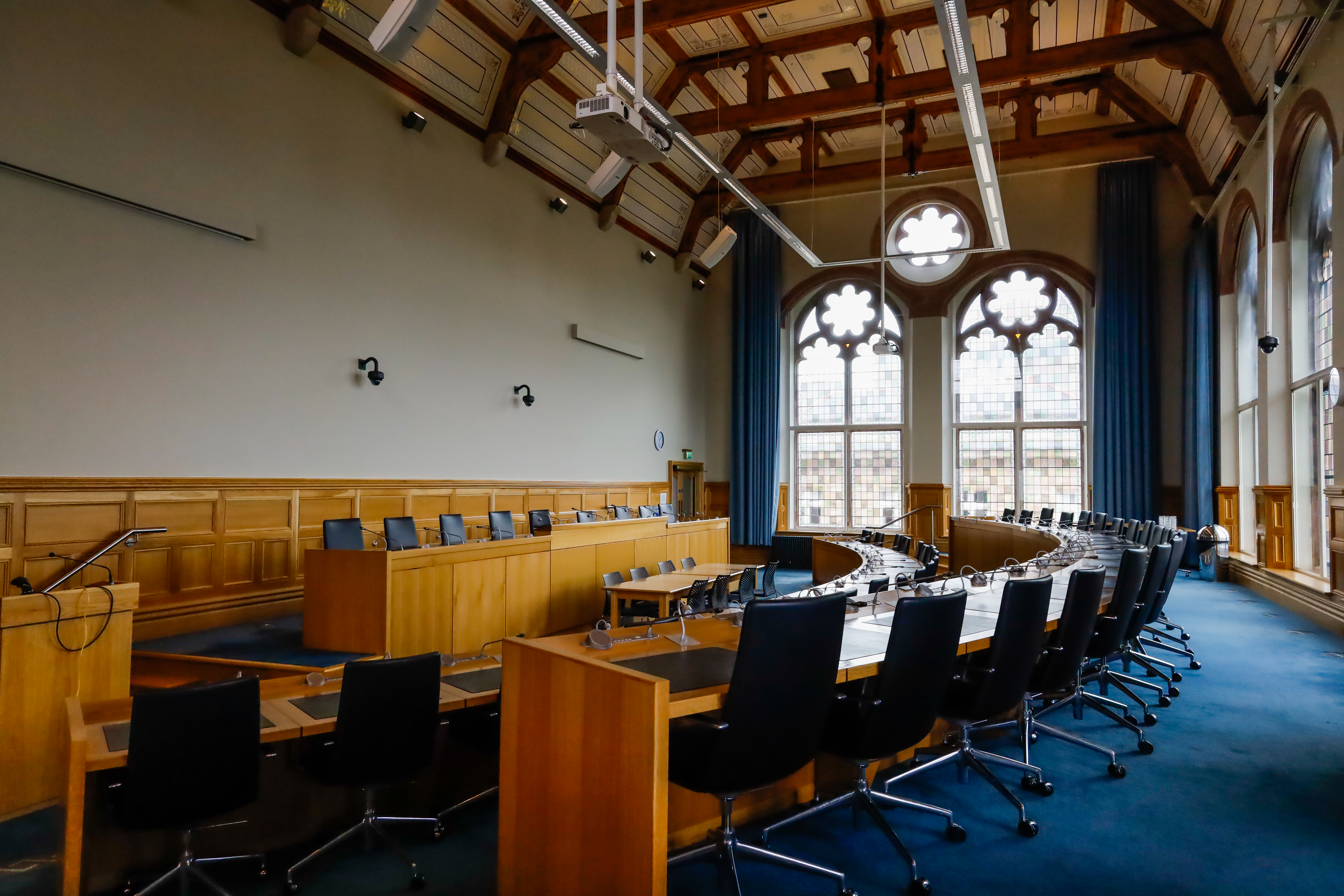
- Guildhall, Derry (pictured) and Council Offices, 47 Derry Road, Strabane

Website
- www.derrystrabane.com

Derry City and Strabane District Council (Irish: Comhairle Chathair Dhoire agus Cheantar an tSratha Báin; Ulster-Scots: Derry Cittie & Stràbane Destrìck Cooncil) is the local authority for Derry and Strabane district in Northern Ireland. It was created as part of the 2014 Northern Ireland local government reform, replacing Derry City Council and Strabane District Council. The first elections to the authority were on 22 May 2014 and it acted as a shadow authority to its two predecessors until the new district formally came into being on 1 April 2015. The name was changed from Derry and Strabane City Council on 24 February 2016.

== Mayoralty ==
=== Mayor ===
From	To	Name	Party
2015	2016	Elisha McCallion	Sinn Féin
2016	2017	Hilary McClintock	DUP
2017	2018	Maolíosa McHugh	Sinn Féin
2018	2019	John Boyle	SDLP
2019	2020	Michaela Boyle	Sinn Féin
2020	2021	Brian Tierney	SDLP
2021	2022	Graham Warke	DUP
2022	2023	Sandra Duffy	Sinn Féin
2023	2024	Patrica Logue	Sinn Féin
2024	2025	Lilian Seenoi-Barr	SDLP
2025	2026	Ruairí McHugh	Sinn Féin
2026	2027	Grace Uí Niallais	Sinn Féin

=== Deputy Mayor ===
From	To	Name	Party
2015	2016	Thomas Kerrigan	DUP
2016	2017	Jim McKeever	SDLP
2017	2018	John Boyle	SDLP
2018	2019	Derek Hussey	UUP
2019	2020	Cara Hunter	SDLP
2020	2021	Graham Warke	DUP
2021	2022	Christopher Jackson	Sinn Féin
2022	2023	Angela Dobbins	SDLP
2023	2024	Jason Barr	SDLP
2024	2025	Darren Guy	UUP
2025	2026	Niree McMorris	DUP
2026	2027	Catherine McDaid	SDLP

== Councillors ==
For the purpose of elections the council is divided into seven district electoral areas (DEAs):

Area	Seats
Ballyarnett	6
Derg	5
Faughan	5
Foyleside	5
Sperrin	7
The Moor	5
The Waterside	7

=== Party strengths ===
Party	Elected 2014	Elected 2019	Elected 2023	Current
Sinn Féin	16	11	18	18
SDLP	10	11	10	8
DUP	8	7	5	5
UUP	2	2	3	3
People Before Profit	0	2	1	1
Alliance	0	2	0	0
Aontú	0	1	0	0
Independent	4	4	3	5

=== Councillors by electoral area ===
Borders of the DEAs within Derry City and Strabane

Current council members
District electoral area	Name	Party
Ballyarnett	Sandra Duffy	Sinn Féin
Ballyarnett	Rory Farrell	SDLP
Ballyarnett	Amanda Clarke †	Sinn Féin
Ballyarnett	Pat Murphy	Sinn Féin
Ballyarnett	Brian Tierney ‡‡	SDLP
Ballyarnett	Catherine McDaid	SDLP
Derg	Keith Kerrigan	DUP
Derg	Ruairí McHugh	Sinn Féin
Derg	Derek Hussey	UUP
Derg	Antaine Ó Fearghail	Sinn Féin
Derg	Caroline Devine	Sinn Féin
Faughan	Janice Montgomery †	UUP
Faughan	Declan Norris	SDLP
Faughan	Amanda Lynch †	DUP
Faughan	Alex Duffy	Sinn Féin
Faughan	Sean Fleming	Sinn Féin
Foyleside	Conor Heaney	Sinn Féin
Foyleside	Grace Uí Niallais	Sinn Féin
Foyleside	Shaun Harkin	People Before Profit
Foyleside	Shauna Cusack ‡	Independent
Foyleside	Lilian Seenoi-Barr	SDLP
Sperrin	Paul Boggs	Sinn Féin
Sperrin	Fergal Leonard	Sinn Féin
Sperrin	Brian Harte	Sinn Féin
Sperrin	Jason Barr ‡	Independent
Sperrin	Raymond Barr	Independent
Sperrin	Gary Wilkinson †	DUP
Sperrin	Paul Gallagher	Independent
The Moor	Gary Donnelly	Independent
The Moor	Aisling Hutton	Sinn Féin
The Moor	John Boyle	SDLP
The Moor	Patricia Logue	Sinn Féin
The Moor	Emma McGinley	Sinn Féin
Waterside	Liz McGowan †	Sinn Féin
Waterside	Darren Guy	UUP
Waterside	Christopher Jackson	Sinn Féin
Waterside	Chelsea Cooke	DUP
Waterside	Niree McMorris	DUP
Waterside	Sean Mooney	SDLP
Waterside	Martin Reilly	SDLP

== Premises ==
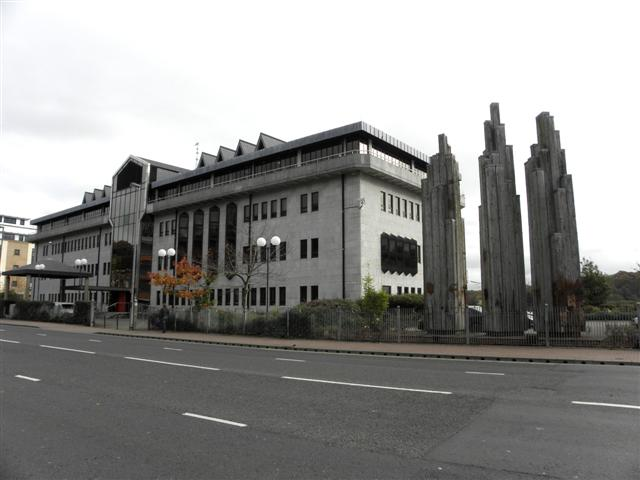
98 Strand Road, Derry: One of the council's two main administrative buildings

The council is headquartered at 98 Strand Road, Derry, which was the former Derry City Council headquarters. The council also has an office at 47 Derry Road, Strabane. Council meetings are held at the Guildhall in Derry.

== Population ==
The area covered by the new council has a population of 150,756 residents according to the 2011 UK census.

== See also ==
- Local government in Northern Ireland
- 2014 Northern Ireland local elections
- Political make-up of local councils in the United Kingdom
