= 2023 Derry City and Strabane District Council election =

2023 election in Northern Ireland

- 18 May 2023

All 40 council seats 21 seats needed for a majority
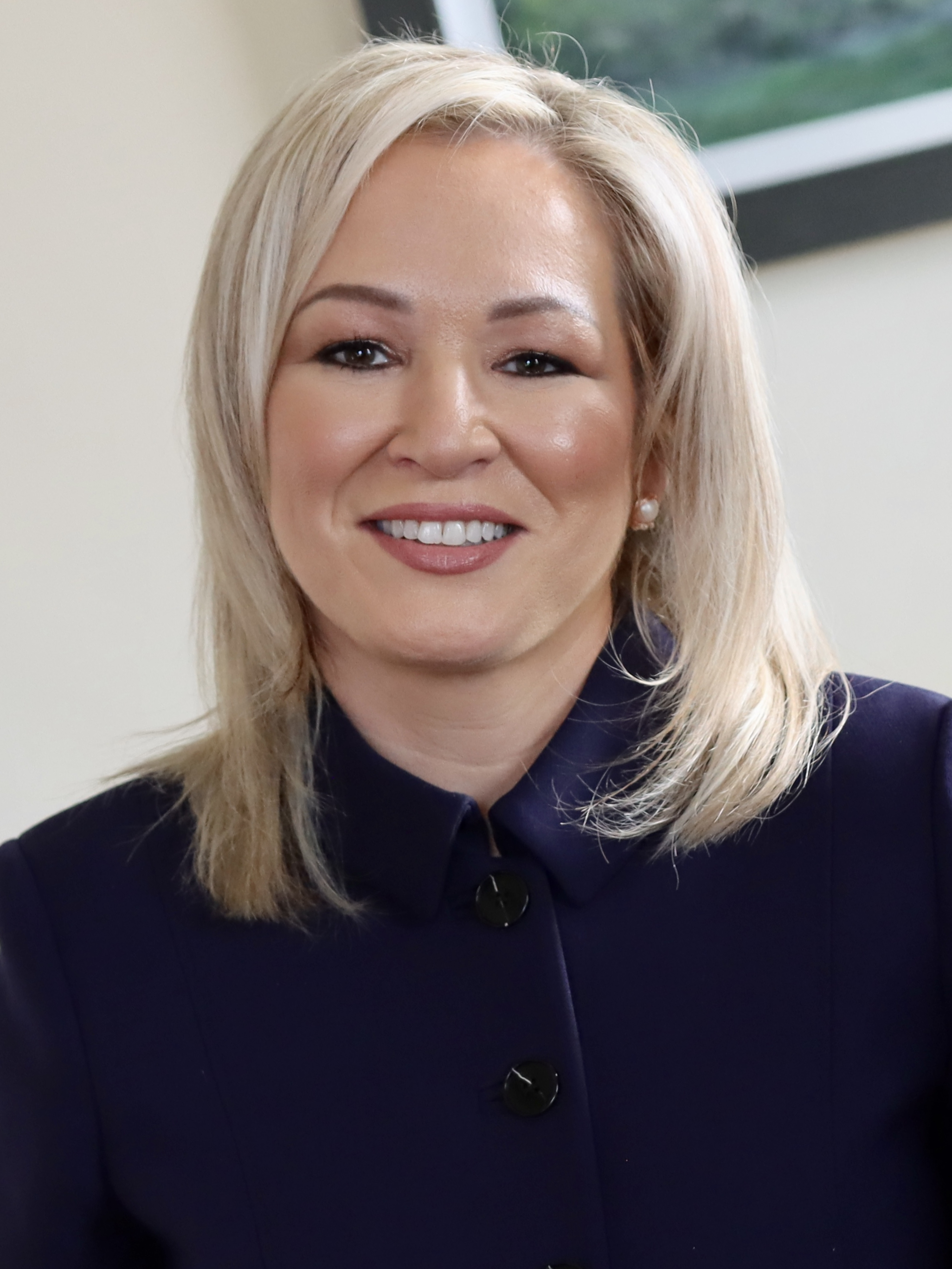

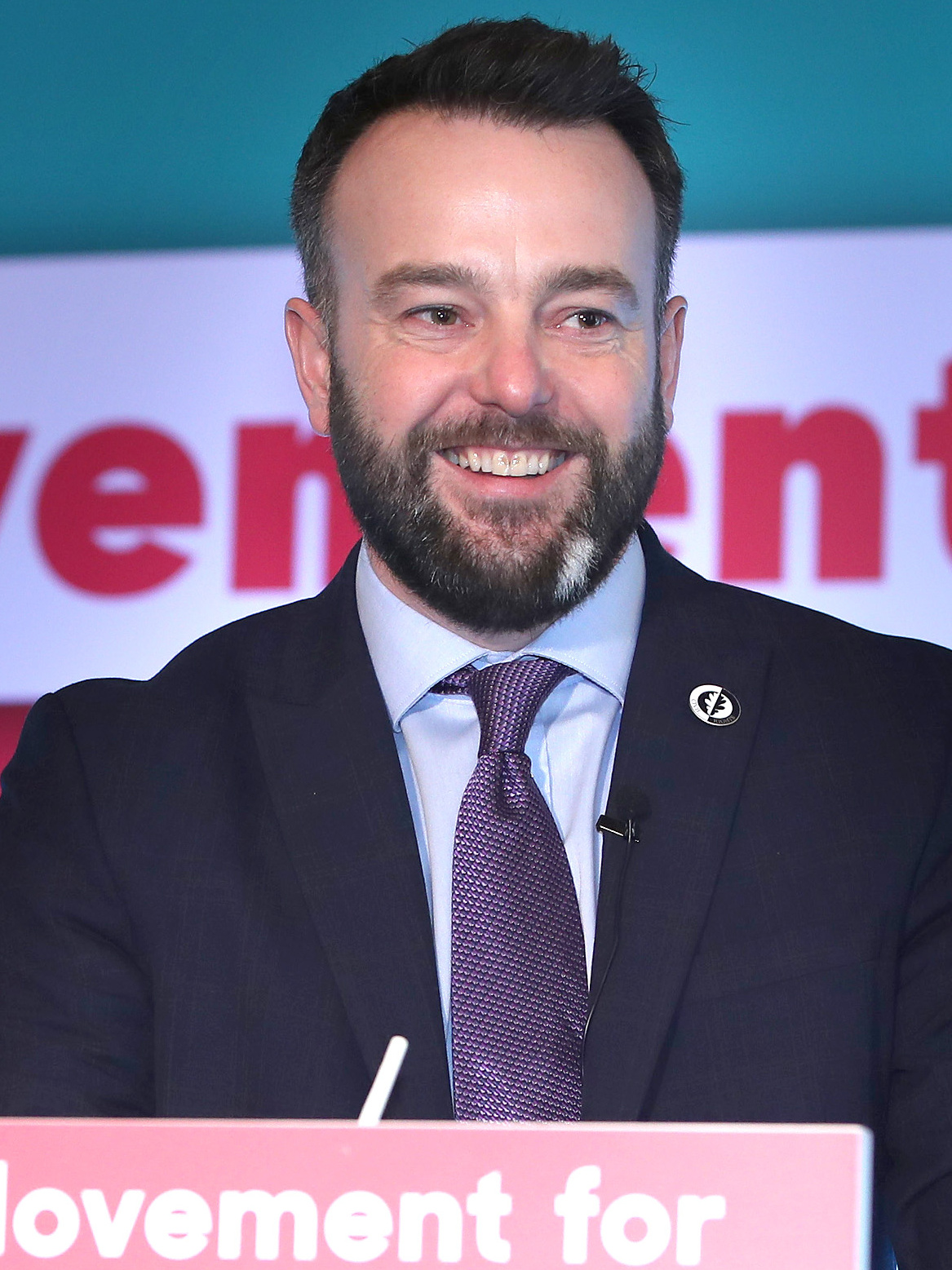

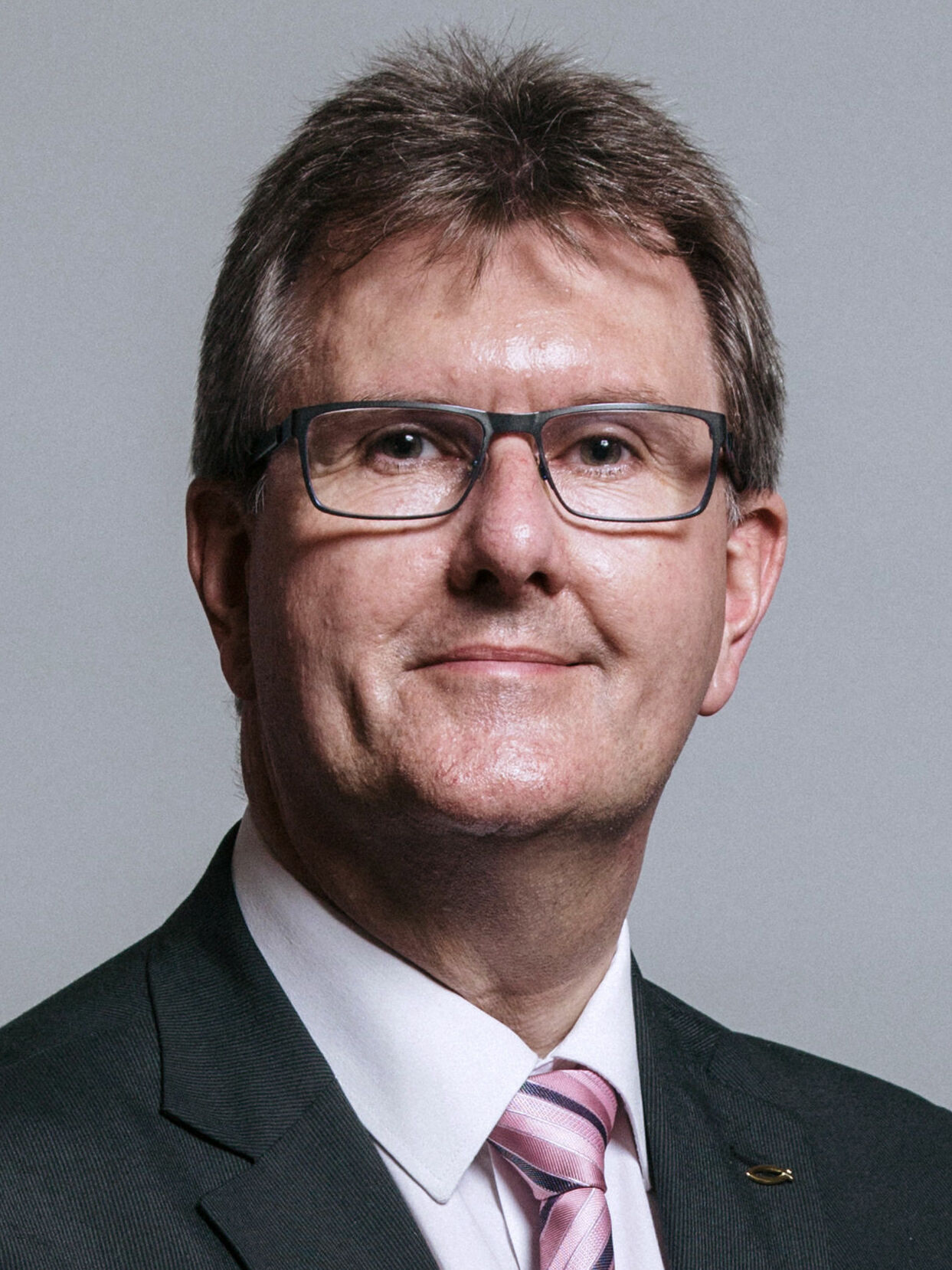

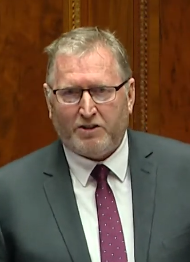

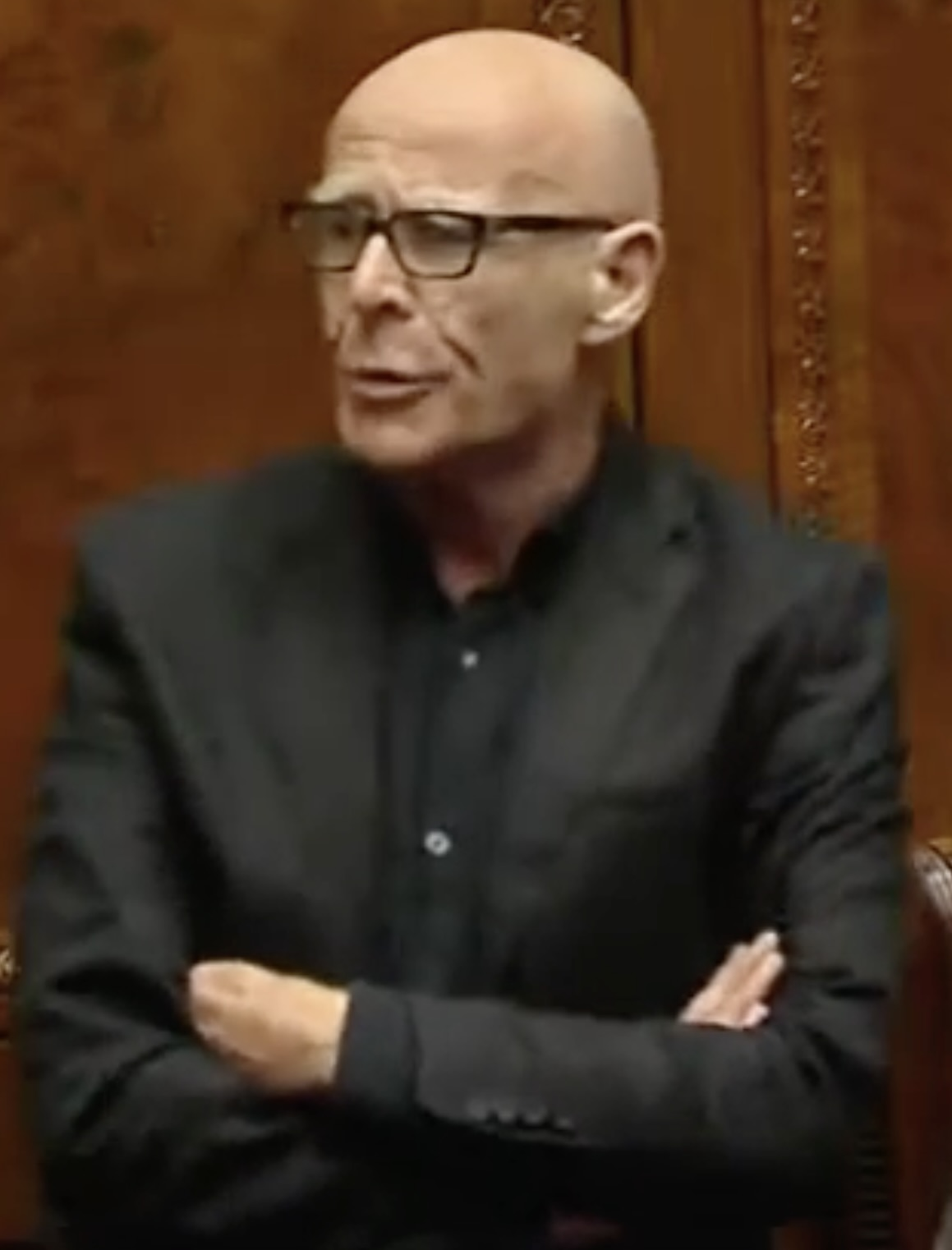
	First party	Second party	Third party
Leader	Michelle O'Neill (Note: The leader of Sinn Féin is Mary Lou McDonald, who sits as a TD in the Irish Dáil Éireann for Dublin Central. O'Neill is the leader of the party in Northern Ireland.)	Colum Eastwood	Jeffrey Donaldson
Party	Sinn Féin	SDLP	DUP
Last election	11	11	7
Seats won	18	10	5
Seat change	▲7	▼1	▼2
Popular vote	24,658	12,689	7,955
Percentage	38.7%	19.9%	12.5%
Swing	▲10.6%	▼5.5%	▼2.2%
	Fourth party	Fifth party	Sixth party
Leader	Doug Beattie		Eamonn McCann (Note: People Before Profit has a collective leadership but for the purposes of registration to the UK Electoral Commission Eamonn McCann is registered as the party's leader in Northern Ireland.)
Party	UUP	Independent	People Before Profit
Last election	2	4	2
Seats won	3	3	1
Seat change	▲1	▼1	▼1
Popular vote	5,393	4,927	3,320
Percentage	8.5%	7.7%	5.2%
Swing	▲1.7%	▼4.9%	▼0.7%
- Derry and Strabane 2019 Council Election Results by DEA (Shaded by plurality of FPVs)
Council control before election
No overall control
Council control after election
No overall control

The 2023 election to Derry City and Strabane District Council was held on 18 May 2023, alongside other local elections in Northern Ireland, two weeks after local elections in England. The Northern Ireland elections were delayed by 2 weeks to avoid overlapping with the coronation of King Charles III.

The election returned 40 members to the council via Single Transferable Vote.

== Election results ==
Derry City and Strabane District Council Election Result 2023
Party	Seats	Gains	Losses	Net gain/loss	Seats %	Votes %	Votes	+/−
Sinn Féin	18	7	0	▲7	45.00	38.73	24,658	▲10.62
SDLP	10	0	1	▼1	25.00	19.93	12,689	▼5.54
DUP	5	0	2	▼2	12.50	12.49	7,955	▼2.21
UUP	3	1	0	▲1	7.50	8.47	5,393	▲1.67
Independent	3	0	1	▼1	7.50	7.74	4,927	▼4.87
People Before Profit	1	0	1	▼1	2.50	5.22	3,320	▼0.69
Alliance	0	0	2	▼2	0.00	4.47	2,849	▼0.23
Aontú	0	0	1	▼1	0.00	2.95	1,878	▲1.25
Total	40						63,669	

Note: "Votes" are the first preference votes.

== Districts summary ==
Results of the 2023 Derry City and Strabane District Council election by district
District Electoral Area (DEA)	%	Cllrs	%	Cllrs	%	Cllrs	%	Cllrs	%	Cllrs	%	Cllrs	%	Cllrs	Total cllrs
District Electoral Area (DEA)	Sinn Féin		SDLP		DUP		UUP		PBP		Alliance		Independents and others		Total cllrs
Ballyarnett	45.4	3 ▲1	33.5	3	0.0	0	0.0	0	7.5	0	4.5	0	9.1	0 ▼1	6
Derg	45.4	3 ▲1	8.5	0 ▼1	19.5	1	16.1	1	1.3	0	2.1	0	7.1	0	5
Faughan	29.1	2 ▲1	18.9	1	20.3	1 ▼1	15.8	1 ▲1	3.8	0	8.6	0 ▼1	3.4	0	5
Foyleside	41.3	2 ▲1	35.4	2	0.0	0	0.0	0	13.7	1	3.7	0	5.9	0 ▼1	5
Sperrin	40.4	3 ▲1	11.4	1	18.3	1 ▼1	4.1	0	1.9	0	3.2	0	20.7	2	7
The Moor	44.6	3 ▲1	16.3	1	0.0	0	0.0	0	7.8	0 ▼1	2.0	0	29.3	1	5
Waterside	27.2	2 ▲1	19.0	2	22.8	2	20.6	1	3.6	0	6.9	0 ▼1	0.0	0	7
Total	38.73	18 ▲7	19.93	10 ▼1	12.49	5 ▼2	8.47	3 ▲1	5.22	1 ▼1	4.47	0 ▼2	10.69	3 ▼2	40

== District results ==
=== Ballyarnett ===
2019: 3 x SDLP, 2 x Sinn Féin, 1 x Aontú

2023: 3 x Sinn Féin, 3 x SDLP

2019–2023 Change: Sinn Féin gain from Aontú

Ballyarnett - 6 seats
Party	Candidate	FPv%	Count					
Party	Candidate	FPv%	1	2	3	4	5	6
Sinn Féin	Sandra Duffy*	22.22%	2,164					
SDLP	Rory Farrell*	14.43%	1,405					
Sinn Féin	John McGowan* †	13.34%	1,299	1,601.05				
Sinn Féin	Pat Murphy	9.86%	960	1,256.10	1,289.65	1,474.93		
SDLP	Brian Tierney* ‡‡	10.33%	1,006	1,057.80	1,128.50	1,136.42	1,165.70	1,338.70
SDLP	Catherine McDaid	8.79%	856	896.25	1,052.80	1,059.04	1,086.40	1,318.40
Aontú	Emmet Doyle*	9.11%	887	909.40	944.45	945.89	955.73	1,147.73
People Before Profit	Damien Doherty	7.46%	727	745.20	852.45	855.33	869.25	
Alliance	Colm Cavanagh	4.48%	436	457.35				
Electorate: 19,139 Valid: 9,740 (50.89%) Spoilt: 189 Quota: 1,392 Turnout: 9.929 (51.88%)

=== Derg ===
2019: 2 x Sinn Féin, 1 x DUP, 1 x UUP, 1 x SDLP

2023: 3 x Sinn Féin, 1 x DUP, 1 x UUP

2019–2023 Change: Sinn Féin gain from SDLP

Derg - 5 seats
Party	Candidate	FPv%	Count				
Party	Candidate	FPv%	1	2	3	4	5
DUP	Keith Kerrigan*	19.52%	1,669				
Sinn Féin	Ruairí McHugh*	16.87%	1,442				
UUP	Derek Hussey*	16.11%	1,377	1,592.88			
Sinn Féin	Antaine Ó Fearghail	14.00%	1,197	1,197.00	1,197.28	1,255.28	1,371.56
Sinn Féin	Caroline Devine	14.57%	1,246	1,246.14	1,246.28	1,306.28	1,342.56
SDLP	Steven Edwards*	8.46%	723	726.78	748.20	888.74	1,151.34
Independent	Andy Patton	5.93%	507	514.42	586.94	689.24	
Alliance	Anne Murray	2.07%	177	178.26	207.24		
People Before Profit	Adam McGinley	1.31%	112	112.56	120.68		
Aontú	Leza Houston	1.16%	99	99.00	102.78		
Electorate: 13,672 Valid: 8,549 (62.53%) Spoilt: 111 Quota: 1,425 Turnout: 8,660 (63.33%)

=== Faughan ===
2019: 2 x DUP, 1 x SDLP, 1 x Sinn Féin, 1 x Alliance

2023: 2 x Sinn Féin, 1 x UUP, 1 x SDLP, 1 x DUP

2019–2023 Change: Sinn Féin and UUP gain from DUP and Alliance

Faughan - 5 seats
Party	Candidate	FPv%	Count					
Party	Candidate	FPv%	1	2	3	4	5	6
UUP	Ryan McCready* †	15.84%	1,282	1,414				
SDLP	Declan Norris*	11.35%	919	984	989.22	1,396.22		
DUP	Julie Middleton †	12.21%	988	1,016	1,032.82	1,037.82	1,659.82	
Sinn Féin	Alex Duffy*	14.74%	1,193	1,244	1,244.58	1,325.16	1,325.16	1,326.16
Sinn Féin	Sean Fleming	14.35%	1,162	1,201	1,201.58	1,241.58	1,242.58	1,243.48
Alliance	Rachael Ferguson*	8.59%	695	813	826.34	947.50	962.88	1,054.88
DUP	Gary Wilkinson	8.07%	653	685	708.20	712.78		
SDLP	Hayley Canning	7.58%	614	682	685.48			
People Before Profit	Damien Gallagher	3.83%	310					
Independent	Graham Warke*	3.45%	279					
Electorate: 14,532 Valid: 8,095 (55.70%) Spoilt: 93 Quota: 1,350 Turnout: 8,188 (56.34%)

=== Foyleside ===
2019: 2 x SDLP, 1 x Sinn Féin, 1 x People Before Profit, 1 x Independent

2023: 2 x Sinn Féin, 2 x SDLP, 1 x People Before Profit

2019–2023 Change: Sinn Féin gain from Independent

Foyleside - 5 seats
Party	Candidate	FPv%	Count				
Party	Candidate	FPv%	1	2	3	4	5
Sinn Féin	Conor Heaney*	25.77%	1,846				
Sinn Féin	Grace Uí Niallais	15.57%	1,115	1,635.80			
People Before Profit	Shaun Harkin*	13.67%	979	999.65	1,074.90	1,140.15	1,239.15
SDLP	Shauna Cusack* ‡	13.23%	948	984.75	1,072.25	1,131.35	1,200.35
SDLP	Lilian Seenoi-Barr*	13.40%	960	988.00	1,073.40	1,130.30	1,177.30
SDLP	Stephen McCallion	8.74%	626	638.60	672.55	734.70	777.70
Aontú	Seán Mac Cearáin	5.91%	423	434.55	472.70	493.50	
Alliance	Danny McCloskey	3.71%	266	275.45	307.30		
Electorate: 13,372 Valid: 7,163 (53.57%) Spoilt: 136 Quota: 1,194 Turnout: 7,299 (54.58%)

=== Sperrin ===
2019: 2 x Sinn Féin, 2 x DUP, 2 x Independent, 1 x SDLP

2023: 3 x Sinn Féin, 1 x SDLP, 1 x DUP, 2 x Independent

2019–2023 Change: Sinn Féin gain from DUP

Sperrin - 7 seats
Party	Candidate	FPv%	Count									
Party	Candidate	FPv%	1	2	3	4	5	6	7	8	9	10
Sinn Féin	Paul Boggs	16.87%	1,993									
Sinn Féin	Fergal Leonard	13.97%	1,650									
Sinn Féin	Brian Harte	9.52%	1,125	1,480.00								
SDLP	Jason Barr* ‡	6.87%	811	847.75	896.35	924.09	953.92	1,019.53	1,174.93	1,208.93	1,569.93	
Independent	Raymond Barr*	8.35%	985	1,014.75	1,024.11	1,053.11	1,110.65	1,157.02	1,206.45	1,217.45	1,345.06	1,414.91
DUP	Allan Bresland* †	10.11%	1,194	1,194.00	1,194.00	1,198.00	1,200.00	1,208.00	1,217.18	1,401.18	1,412.43	1,412.98
Independent	Paul Gallagher*	8.82%	1,042	1,065.50	1,072.52	1,079.52	1,129.17	1,164.41	1,194.95	1,198.95	1,277.64	1,297.00
DUP	Maurice Devenney*	8.16%	964	964.00	964.18	967.18	967.43	968.43	973.43	1,201.43	1,206.43	1,208.08
SDLP	Tommy Forbes	4.55%	538	559.50	596.58	613.71	634.50	689.86	787.75	810.93		
UUP	Glen Miller	4.14%	489	489.25	489.43	490.43	491.43	501.43	557.43			
Alliance	Mel Boyle	3.23%	381	390.50	407.60	411.21	451.58	488.74				
Independent	Patsy Kelly	2.08%	246	256.75	284.83	294.73	312.09					
People Before Profit	Carol Gallagher	1.91%	226	233.75	240.41	254.56						
Aontú	Darán Mac Meanman	1.42%	168	169.50	182.64							
Electorate: 19,143 Valid: 11,812 (61.70%) Spoilt: 183 Quota: 1,477 Turnout: 11,995 (62.66%)

=== The Moor ===
2019: 2 x Sinn Féin, 1 x SDLP, 1 x People Before Profit, 1 x Independent

2023: 3 x Sinn Féin, 1 x SDLP, 1 x Independent

2019–2023 Change: Sinn Féin gain from People Before Profit

The Moor - 5 seats
Party	Candidate	FPv%	Count					
Party	Candidate	FPv%	1	2	3	4	5	6
Independent	Gary Donnelly*	25.25%	1,868					
Sinn Féin	Aisling Hutton	17.80%	1,317					
SDLP	John Boyle*	10.29%	761	829.46	877.72	933.00	1,280.00	
Sinn Féin	Patricia Logue*	14.45%	1,069	1,163.92	1,173.34	1,219.22	1,255.22	
Sinn Féin	Emma McGinley*	12.33%	912	983.40	985.40	1,013.86	1,043.00	1,109.18
People Before Profit	Maeve O'Neill*	7.81%	578	765.74	796.94	883.74	951.96	957.90
SDLP	Dermott Henderson	6.02%	445	505.06	543.00	584.60		
Aontú	Darryl Christy	4.07%	301	429.10	439.04			
Alliance	Michael Downey	1.97%	146	161.54				
Electorate: 13,403 Valid: 7,397 (55.19%) Spoilt: 201 Quota: 1,233 Turnout: 7,598 (56.69%)

=== Waterside ===
2019: 2 x DUP, 2 x SDLP, 1 x Sinn Féin, 1 x UUP, 1 x Alliance

2023: 2 x Sinn Féin, 2 x DUP, 2 x SDLP, 1 x UUP

2019–2023 Change: Sinn Féin gain from Alliance

Waterside - 7 seats
Party	Candidate	FPv%	Count						
Party	Candidate	FPv%	1	2	3	4	5	6	7
Sinn Féin	Caitlin Deeney †	17.86%	1,949						
UUP	Darren Guy*	16.47%	1,797						
Sinn Féin	Christopher Jackson*	9.34%	1,019	1,540.10					
DUP	Chelsea Cooke	11.56%	1,262	1,262.30	1,316.54	1,319.54	1,320.05	1,526.05	
DUP	Niree McMorris*	11.23%	1,225	1,225	1,279.72	1,281.72	1,282.06	1,368.06	
SDLP	Sean Mooney*	9.81%	1,071	1,105.20	1,109.76	1,213.90	1,323.55	1,355.11	1,361.11
SDLP	Martin Reilly*	9.22%	1,006	1,013.80	1,020.28	1,092.26	1,120.65	1,154.21	1,163.21
Alliance	Philip McKinney*	6.85%	748	758.50	773.62	916.54	945.10	1,105.05	1,153.05
UUP	Janice Montgomery	4.11%	448	448.30	737.50	743.46	744.82		
People Before Profit	Davina Pulvis	3.56%	388	393.70	396.34				
Electorate: 21,240 Valid: 10,913 (51.38%) Spoilt: 202 Quota: 1,365 Turnout: 11,115 (52.33%)

== Changes during the term ==
=== † Co-options ===
Date co-opted	Electoral Area	Party	Outgoing	Co-optee	Reason
20 October 2023	Sperrin	DUP	Allan Bresland	Gary Wilkinson	Bresland retired.
29 January 2024	Faughan	UUP	Ryan McCready	Janice Montgomery	McCready resigned.
19 February 2024	Ballyarnett	Sinn Féin	John McGowan	Amanda Clarke	McGowan resigned.
3 December 2025	Waterside	Sinn Féin	Caitlin Deeney	Liz McGowan	Deeney resigned.
13 May 2026	Faughan	DUP	Julie Middleton	Amanda Lynch	Middleton was co-opted to the Northern Ireland Assembly.

=== ‡ Changes in affiliation ===
Date	Electoral Area	Name	Previous affiliation	New affiliation	Circumstance
30 April 2024	Sperrin	Jason Barr	SDLP	Independent	Left the SDLP following criticisms of the party's process for selecting the next Mayor.
1 May 2024	Foyleside	Shauna Cusack	SDLP	Independent	Left the SDLP following criticisms of the party's process for selecting the next Mayor.
27 January 2025	Ballyarnett	Brian Tierney	SDLP	Independent	Suspended over soldier court reference.
16 April 2025	Ballyarnett	Brian Tierney	Independent	SDLP	Reinstated to the party.
