= Julie Middleton =

Northern Irish politician

Julie Middleton MLA
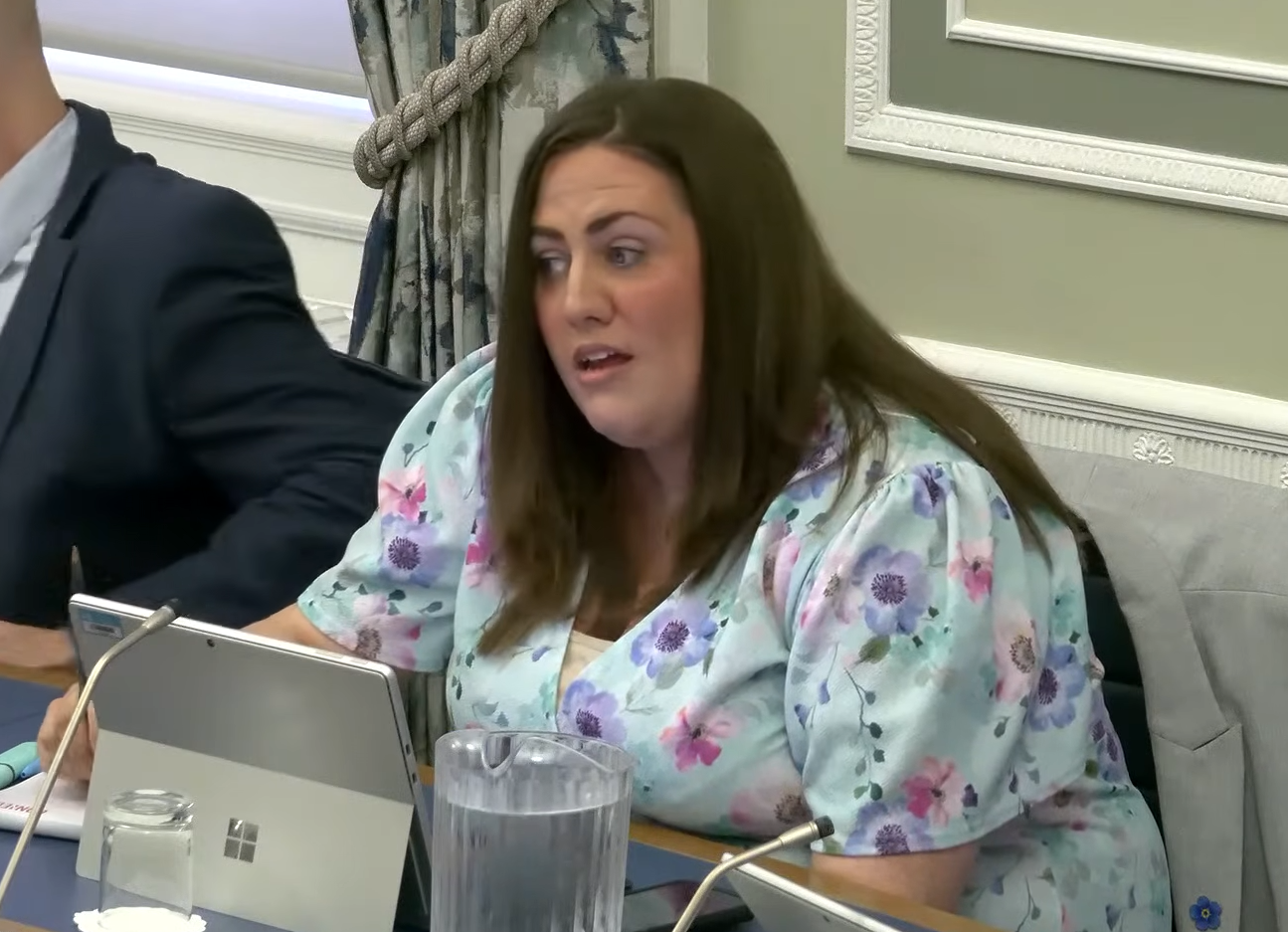

Member of the Legislative Assembly for Foyle
- Incumbent
- Assumed office 13 April 2026
- Preceded by: Gary Middleton

Member of Derry City and Strabane District Council
- In office 18 May 2023 – 13 April 2026
- Constituency: Faughan

Personal details
- Party: Democratic Unionist Party
- Spouse: Gary Middleton

Julie Middleton is a Northern Irish Democratic Unionist Party politician who has served as MLA for Foyle since 2026. She previously served as a Member of Derry City and Strabane District Council for Faughan from 2023 until 2026. She was co-opted to the Assembly in April 2026, following the resignation of her husband, Gary Middleton, on mental health grounds. She is the first female unionist MLA for the constituency.
