= Faughan (District Electoral Area) =

District electoral area in Northern Ireland

- Derry and Strabane District Council DEA constituency

Current constituency
- Created: 2014
- Seats: 5 (2014-)
- Councillors: Alex Duffy (SF); Sean Fleming (SF); Amanda Lynch (DUP); Janice Montgomery (UUP); Declan Norris (SDLP)

Faughan DEA within Derry City and Strabane

Faughan is one of the seven district electoral areas (DEA) in Derry and Strabane, Northern Ireland. The district elects five members to Derry and Strabane District Council and contains the wards of Claudy, Eglinton, Enagh, New Buildings and Slievekirk. Faughan forms part of the Foyle constituencies for the Northern Ireland Assembly and UK Parliament.

It was created for the 2014 local elections, replacing the Rural DEA which had existed since 1985.

== Councillors ==
Election	Councillor (Party)	Councillor (Party)	Councillor (Party)	Councillor (Party)	Councillor (Party)
May 2026 Co-Option	Alex Duffy (Sinn Féin)	Sean Fleming (Sinn Féin)	Declan Norris (SDLP)	Janice Montgomery (UUP)	Amanda Lynch (DUP)
January 2024 Co-Option	Alex Duffy (Sinn Féin)	Sean Fleming (Sinn Féin)	Declan Norris (SDLP)	Janice Montgomery (UUP)	Julie Middleton (DUP)
2023	Alex Duffy (Sinn Féin)	Sean Fleming (Sinn Féin)	Declan Norris (SDLP)	Ryan McCready (UUP)/ (DUP)	Julie Middleton (DUP)
December 2022 Co-Option	Alex Duffy (Sinn Féin)	Rachael Ferguson (Alliance)	Declan Norris (SDLP)	Ryan McCready (UUP)/ (DUP)	Graham Warke (DUP)/ (Independent)
October 2022 Co-Option	Paul Fleming (Sinn Féin)	Rachael Ferguson (Alliance)	Declan Norris (SDLP)	Ryan McCready (UUP)/ (DUP)	Graham Warke (DUP)/ (Independent)
June 2022 Defection	Paul Fleming (Sinn Féin)	Rachael Ferguson (Alliance)	Jim McKeever (SDLP)/ (Independent)	Ryan McCready (UUP)/ (DUP)	Graham Warke (DUP)/ (Independent)
July 2021 Defections	Paul Fleming (Sinn Féin)	Rachael Ferguson (Alliance)	Jim McKeever (SDLP)/ (Independent)	Ryan McCready (UUP)/ (DUP)	Graham Warke (DUP)/ (Independent)
2019	Paul Fleming (Sinn Féin)	Rachael Ferguson (Alliance)	Jim McKeever (SDLP)/ (Independent)	Ryan McCready (UUP)/ (DUP)	Graham Warke (DUP)/ (Independent)
February 2016 Defection	Paul Fleming (Sinn Féin)	Gus Hastings (SDLP)	Jim McKeever (SDLP)/ (Independent)	Maurice Devenney (DUP)/ (Independent)	Graham Warke (DUP)/ (Independent)
May 2015 Co-Option	Paul Fleming (Sinn Féin)	Gus Hastings (SDLP)	Jim McKeever (SDLP)/ (Independent)	Maurice Devenney (DUP)/ (Independent)	Graham Warke (DUP)/ (Independent)
2014	Paul Fleming (Sinn Féin)	Gus Hastings (SDLP)	Jim McKeever (SDLP)/ (Independent)	Maurice Devenney (DUP)/ (Independent)	Gary Middleton (DUP)

== 2023 Election ==
2019: 2 x DUP, 1 x SDLP, 1 x Sinn Féin, 1 x Alliance

2023: 2 x Sinn Féin, 1 x UUP, 1 x SDLP, 1 x DUP

2019–2023 Change: Sinn Féin and UUP gain from DUP and Alliance

Faughan - 5 seats
Party	Candidate	FPv%	Count					
Party	Candidate	FPv%	1	2	3	4	5	6
UUP	Ryan McCready* †	15.84%	1,282	1,414				
SDLP	Declan Norris*	11.35%	919	984	989.22	1,396.22		
DUP	Julie Middleton †	12.21%	988	1,016	1,032.82	1,037.82	1,659.82	
Sinn Féin	Alex Duffy*	14.74%	1,193	1,244	1,244.58	1,325.16	1,325.16	1,326.16
Sinn Féin	Sean Fleming	14.35%	1,162	1,201	1,201.58	1,241.58	1,242.58	1,243.48
Alliance	Rachael Ferguson*	8.59%	695	813	826.34	947.50	962.88	1,054.88
DUP	Gary Wilkinson	8.07%	653	685	708.20	712.78		
SDLP	Hayley Canning	7.58%	614	682	685.48			
People Before Profit	Damien Gallagher	3.83%	310					
Independent	Graham Warke*	3.45%	279					
Electorate: 14,532 Valid: 8,095 (55.70%) Spoilt: 93 Quota: 1,350 Turnout: 8,188 (56.34%)

== 2019 Election ==
2014: 2 x DUP, 2 x SDLP, 1 x Sinn Féin

2019: 2 x DUP, 1 x SDLP, 1 x Sinn Féin, 1 x Alliance

2014-2019 Change: Alliance gain from SDLP

Faughan - 5 seats
Party	Candidate	FPv%	Count						
Party	Candidate	FPv%	1	2	3	4	5	6	7
DUP	Graham Warke* ‡	14.70%	1,050	1,050	1,051	1,253			
DUP	Ryan McCready ‡	13.16%	940	940	942	1,225			
SDLP	Jim McKeever* ‡†	7.91%	565	577	868	905	919.3	926.43	1,410.43
Sinn Féin	Paul Fleming* †	11.96%	854	1,116	1,140	1,140	1,140.65	1,140.88	1,200.88
Alliance	Rachael Ferguson	10.96%	783	795	859	965	996.85	1,012.49	1,148.43
Independent	Paul Thomas Hughes	10.26%	733	737	782	807	816.75	821.12	865
SDLP	Brenda Stevenson	9.70%	693	717	767	784	789.2	794.49	
UUP	William Jamieson	9.94%	710	710	715				
SDLP	Gus Hastings*	6.87%	491	498					
Sinn Féin	Conor Heaney	4.54%	324						
Electorate: 13,601 Valid: 7,143 (52.52%) Spoilt: 103 Quota: 1,191 Turnout: 7,246 (53.28%)

== 2014 Election ==
2014: 2 x DUP, 2 x SDLP, 1 x Sinn Féin

Faughan - 5 seats
Party	Candidate	FPv%	Count								
Party	Candidate	FPv%	1	2	3	4	5	6	7	8	9
DUP	Gary Middleton* †	17.05%	1,077								
DUP	Maurice Devenney* ‡	14.81%	936	1,034	1,052.72	1,090.72					
Sinn Féin	Paul Fleming*	14.17%	895	898	898.04	914.04	1,195.04				
SDLP	Jim McKeever	7.80%	493	496	496.14	564.14	591.16	651	655	914.18	985.18
SDLP	Gus Hastings*	7.79%	492	497	497.02	542.04	561.04	602.4	605.4	796.94	952.94
UUP	Ronnie McKeegan	8.78%	555	605	607.16	668.2	669.2	670.08	692.08	704.1	717.1
Independent	Paul Hughes	7.93%	501	504	504	541	552	575.76	575.76	586.76	
SDLP	Brenda Stevenson*	7.76%	490	491	491.06	522.06	533.06	548.02	550.02		
Sinn Féin	Michael McCrossan	5.67%	358	358	358.02	365.02					
Alliance	David Hawthorne	5.32%	336	345	345.16						
UKIP	Geoff Cruickshank	2.93%	185								
Electorate: 12,933 Valid: 6,318 (48.85%) Spoilt: 86 Quota: 1,054 Turnout: 6,404 (49.52%)
