= The Moor (District Electoral Area) =

District electoral area in Northern Ireland

- Derry and Strabane District Council DEA constituency

Current constituency
- Created: 2014
- Seats: 5 (2014-)
- Councillors: John Boyle (SDLP); Gary Donnelly (IND); Aisling Hutton (SF); Patricia Logue (SF); Emma McGinley (SF)

The Moor DEA within Derry City and Strabane

The Moor is one of the seven district electoral areas (DEA) in Derry and Strabane, Northern Ireland. The district elects five members to Derry and Strabane District Council and contains the wards of Brandywell, City Walls, Creggan, Creggan South and Sherriff's Mountain. The Moor forms part of the Foyle constituencies for the Northern Ireland Assembly and UK Parliament.

It was created for the 2014 local elections, replacing the Cityside DEA which had existed since 1985.

== Councillors ==
Election	Councillor (Party)	Councillor (Party)	Councillor (Party)	Councillor (Party)	Councillor (Party)
2023	Patricia Logue (Sinn Féin)	Emma McGinley (Sinn Féin)	Aisling Hutton (Sinn Féin)	John Boyle (SDLP)	Gary Donnelly (Independent)
August 2021 Co-Option	Patricia Logue (Sinn Féin)	Emma McGinley (Sinn Féin)	Maeve O'Neill (PBP)	John Boyle (SDLP)	Gary Donnelly (Independent)
March 2021 Co-Option	Patricia Logue (Sinn Féin)	Tina Burke (Sinn Féin)	Maeve O'Neill (PBP)	John Boyle (SDLP)	Gary Donnelly (Independent)
2019	Patricia Logue (Sinn Féin)	Tina Burke (Sinn Féin)	Eamonn McCann (PBP)	John Boyle (SDLP)	Gary Donnelly (Independent)
September 2018 Co-Option	Patricia Logue (Sinn Féin)	Kevin Campbell (Sinn Féin)	Sharon Duddy (Sinn Féin)	Seán Carr (SDLP)/ (Independent)	Gary Donnelly (Independent)
April 2015 Defection	Patricia Logue (Sinn Féin)	Kevin Campbell (Sinn Féin)	Colly Kelly (Sinn Féin)	Seán Carr (SDLP)/ (Independent)	Gary Donnelly (Independent)
2014	Patricia Logue (Sinn Féin)	Kevin Campbell (Sinn Féin)	Colly Kelly (Sinn Féin)	Seán Carr (SDLP)/ (Independent)	Gary Donnelly (Independent)

== 2023 Election ==
2019: 2 x Sinn Féin, 1 x SDLP, 1 x People Before Profit, 1 x Independent

2023: 3 x Sinn Féin, 1 x SDLP, 1 x Independent

2019–2023 Change: Sinn Féin gain from People Before Profit

The Moor - 5 seats
Party	Candidate	FPv%	Count					
Party	Candidate	FPv%	1	2	3	4	5	6
Independent	Gary Donnelly*	25.25%	1,868					
Sinn Féin	Aisling Hutton	17.80%	1,317					
SDLP	John Boyle*	10.29%	761	829.46	877.72	933.00	1,280.00	
Sinn Féin	Patricia Logue*	14.45%	1,069	1,163.92	1,173.34	1,219.22	1,255.22	
Sinn Féin	Emma McGinley*	12.33%	912	983.40	985.40	1,013.86	1,043.00	1,109.18
People Before Profit	Maeve O'Neill*	7.81%	578	765.74	796.94	883.74	951.96	957.90
SDLP	Dermott Henderson	6.02%	445	505.06	543.00	584.60		
Aontú	Darryl Christy	4.07%	301	429.10	439.04			
Alliance	Michael Downey	1.97%	146	161.54				
Electorate: 13,403 Valid: 7,397 (55.19%) Spoilt: 201 Quota: 1,233 Turnout: 7,598 (56.69%)

== 2019 Election ==
2014: 3 x Sinn Féin, 1 x SDLP, 1 x Independent

2019: 2 x Sinn Féin, 1 x SDLP, 1 x People Before Profit, 1 x Independent

2014-2019 Change: People Before Profit gain from Sinn Féin

The Moor - 5 seats
Party	Candidate	FPv%	Count					
Party	Candidate	FPv%	1	2	3	4	5	6
Independent	Gary Donnelly*	17.73%	1,374					
People Before Profit	Eamonn McCann †	13.36%	1,035	1,053.76	1,106.04	1,271.66	1,301.66	
Sinn Féin	Tina Burke †	9.53%	738	741.15	746.15	765.29	1,111.5	1,581.5
SDLP	John Boyle	13.96%	1,082	1,084.8	1,148.8	1,224.83	1,234.04	1,289.32
Sinn Féin	Patricia Logue*	10.04%	778	780.59	782.59	812.5	969.76	1,140.16
SDLP	Cathy Breslin	8.63%	669	679.71	712.78	787.47	798.61	840.31
Sinn Féin	Kevin Campbell*	9.19%	712	715.78	719.78	735.34	784.48	
Sinn Féin	Sharon Duddy*	7.67%	594	595.47	601.47	614.45		
Independent	Emmet Doyle	6.40%	496	530.16	553.44			
DUP	Niree McMorris	1.91%	148	148				
Alliance	Colm Cavanagh	1.57%	122	122.77				
Electorate: 13,114 Valid: 7,748 (59.08%) Spoilt: 169 Quota: 1,292 Turnout: 7,917 (60.37%)

== 2014 Election ==
2014: 3 x Sinn Féin, 1 x SDLP, 1 x Independent

The Moor - 5 seats
Party	Candidate	FPv%	Count					
Party	Candidate	FPv%	1	2	3	4	5	6
Independent	Gary Donnelly	16.83%	1,154					
Sinn Féin	Kevin Campbell*	16.10%	1,104	1,112	1,149			
Sinn Féin	Colly Kelly* †	11.30%	775	780	789	1,314		
Sinn Féin	Patricia Logue*	14.54%	997	1,006	1,020	1,097	1,261.22	
SDLP	Seán Carr* ‡	12.27%	841	852	1,061	1,079	1,080.02	1,087.5
SDLP	Emmet Doyle	9.86%	676	689	943	961	962.36	968.14
Sinn Féin	Liam Friel	9.54%	654	664	665			
SDLP	Dermott Henderson	7.91%	542	556				
Independent	Patrick Mellon	1.65%	113					
Electorate: 12,536 Valid: 6,856 (54.69%) Spoilt: 174 Quota: 1,143 Turnout: 7,096 (56.60%)
