= Gary Middleton =

Northern Irish politician (born 1990)

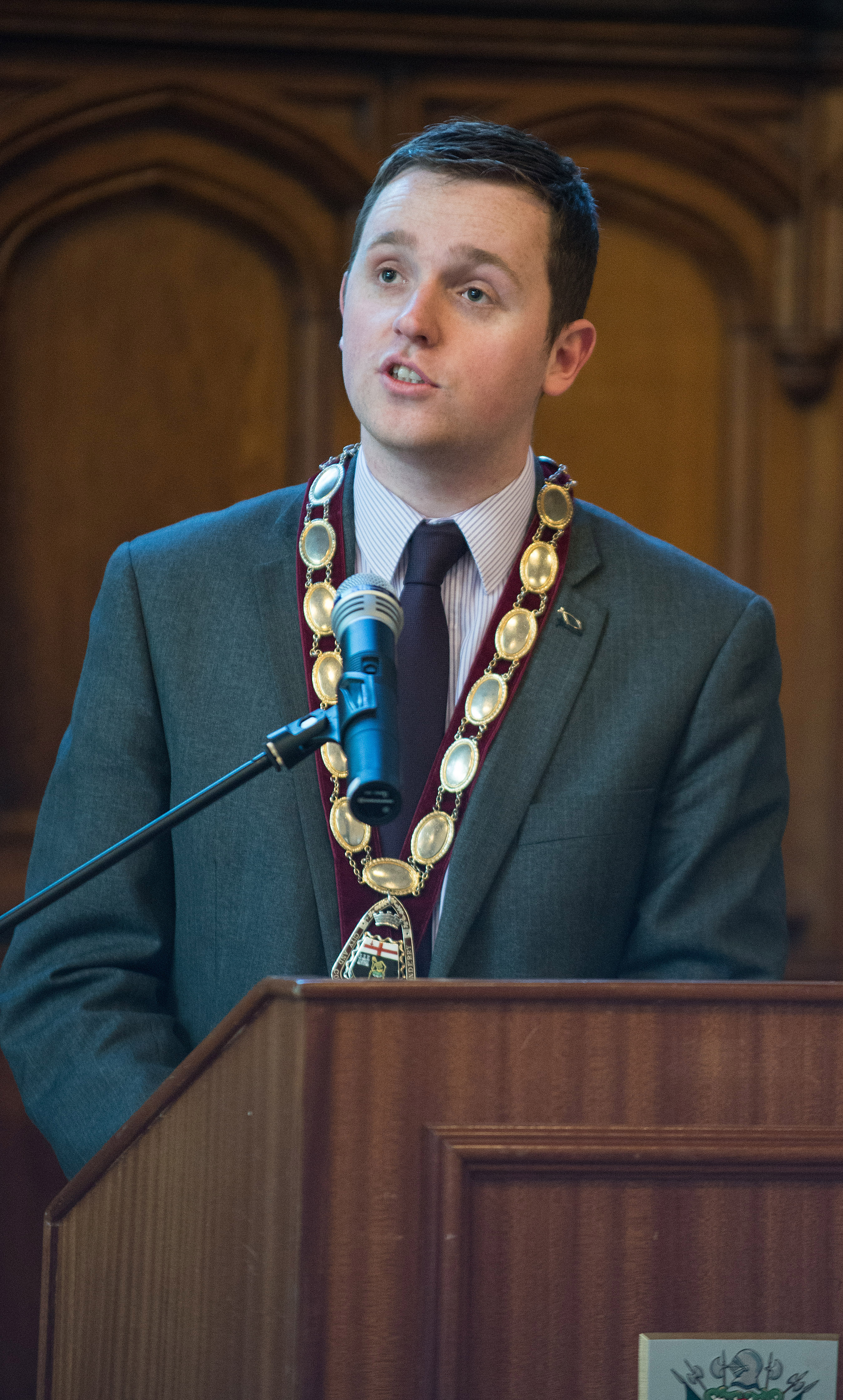
- Middleton in March 2014

Junior Minister at the Executive Office
- In office 17 June 2021 – 5 May 2022 Serving with Declan Kearney
- Preceded by: Gordon Lyons
- Succeeded by: Aisling Reilly (2024)
- In office 2 February 2021 – 8 March 2021; Acting Serving with Declan Kearney
- Preceded by: Gordon Lyons
- Succeeded by: Gordon Lyons

Member of the Legislative Assembly for Foyle
- In office 13 April 2015 – 10 April 2026
- Preceded by: Maurice Devenney
- Succeeded by: Julie Middleton

Member of Derry City and Strabane District Council
- In office 22 May 2014 – 13 April 2015
- Preceded by: Council established
- Succeeded by: Graham Warke
- Constituency: Faughan

Deputy Mayor of Derry City Council
- In office June 2013 – March 2015

Member of Derry City Council
- In office 5 May 2011 – 22 May 2014
- Preceded by: Willie Hay
- Succeeded by: Council abolished
- Constituency: Rural

Personal details
- Born: 20 June 1990 (age 36) Newbuildings, County Londonderry, Northern Ireland
- Party: Democratic Unionist Party
- Spouse: Julie Middleton (m.2015)
- Education: University of Ulster
- Occupation: Politician

Gary Middleton (born 20 June 1990) is a Unionist former politician from Northern Ireland representing the Democratic Unionist Party (DUP). He served as a member of the Northern Ireland Assembly (MLA) for Foyle from 2015 until 2026. Middleton was the DUP Spokesperson for the North West.

He served as Acting Junior Minister for the Executive Office from February to March 2021 while Gordon Lyons was Acting Agriculture Minister while Edwin Poots stood aside due to ill health. In June 2021, Middleton replaced Lyons permanently as Junior Minister. Middleton resigned from politics in April 2026 due to concerns over his mental health.

== Early life ==
Born in Newbuildings, County Londonderry, Middleton studied Computer Science at the University of Ulster, and also obtained a diploma in Civic Leadership and Community Planning from the same institution. Prior to becoming an MLA, he was a youth worker and also worked as an assistant to Foyle MLA William Hay and later Maurice Devenney, who was himself co-opted to replace William Hay in October 2014 upon the latter's retirement after being elevated to the House of Lords.

== Electoral history ==
Middleton was first elected to Derry City Council in 2011 at the age of 20, replacing William Hay by co-option. He also served as Deputy Mayor from June 2013 – March 2015.

In 2014 he was elected to the new Derry and Strabane 'super council' and was appointed group leader of the DUP councillors. In April 2015, he was co-opted to replace fellow DUP member Maurice Devenney in the Northern Ireland Assembly, becoming the assembly's youngest member at 24.

Shortly after joining the assembly, it was announced that Middleton would be the DUP's candidate for the Foyle constituency in the United Kingdom general election, eventually finishing a distant third with 12.4% of the vote.

In April 2026, Middleton resigned as an MLA on mental health grounds, being replaced by his wife Julie Middleton.

General Election 2015: Foyle
Party	Candidate	Votes	%	±%
SDLP	Mark Durkan	17,725	47.9	+3.2
Sinn Féin	Gearóid Ó hEára	11,679	31.6	−0.4
DUP	Gary Middleton	4,573	12.4	+0.5
UUP	Julia Kee	1,226	3.3	+0.1
Alliance	David Hawthorne	835	2.3	+1.7
UKIP	Kyle Thompson	832	2.2	N/A
NI Conservatives	Hamish Badenoch	132	0.4	N/A
Majority		6,046	16.3	
Turnout		37,002	52.8	−4.7
SDLP hold		Swing		

Northern Ireland Assembly
Preceded by Maurice Devenney	MLA for Foyle; 2015–present	Incumbent
