= Gary Donnelly (Irish republican) =

Irish republican

Member of Derry City and Strabane District Council
- Incumbent
- Assumed office 22 May 2014
- Preceded by: Council established
- Constituency: The Moor

Personal details
- Born: 1971 (age 54–55) Derry, Northern Ireland
- Party: Independent Republican

Gary Donnelly is an Irish republican politician and an independent member of the Derry and Strabane District Council since 2014.

== Republican activity ==
Donnelly is a member of the 32 County Sovereignty Movement (32CSM)

=== Arrests and convictions ===
In March 2010, Donnelly was convicted of assaulting a Police Service of Northern Ireland (PSNI) officer and sentenced to seven months imprisonment. While serving his sentence Donnelly briefly went on hunger strike following his removal from the republican wing of HM Prison Maghaberry. Prison officials explained the decision claiming Donnelly had received a death threat from the Real IRA, a charge Donnelly denied.

In August 2010 Donnelly was charged under the auspices of "terrorism legislation" in connection with three pipe bomb attacks in September 2009. Authorities accused Donnelly of being in possession of a mobile phone linked to the attacks. On 22 December of the same year the charges were dropped.

In addition to Donnelly's March 2010 conviction, he has been charged with assaulting police officers on two other occasions. In both cases the charges were eventually dropped.

In November 2014, Donnelly, along with two co-defendants, was sentenced to six-months in prison for "causing criminal damage" by writing an anti-internment slogan on the historic walls of Derry. Donnelly's solicitor asserted that "writing political slogans had been a long-standing tradition and there were no objections from local residents to the graffiti." In January 2015, Donnelly was successful in his appeal of the sentence and was granted a 12-month conditional discharge. He was supported by Irish politicians Clare Daly, Éamon Ó Cuív, Thomas Pringle, and Maureen O'Sullivan. They claimed the charges were unfair.

In July 2015, following a three-volley salute at the funeral of Patsy O'Hara's mother, Donnelly's house was searched by the PSNI. No arrests were made.

On 7 January 2018, Donnelly was arrested and questioned in connection with the 2006 murder of Denis Donaldson, an ex-Sinn Fein member turned British agent. Donnelly was released without charge a day later.

In April 2024, Donnelly was arrested with five others for participating in a Boycott, Divestment, Sanctions demonstration at a supermarket on the Strand Road in Derry.

== Political career ==
On 24 May 2014, Donnelly was elected to the Derry and Strabane District Council. Although a purported member of the 32CSM at the time, Donnelly ran as an independent and received 1,154 votes.

He supported independent candidate Thomas Pringle in the Donegal constituency in the 2016 general election.

Donnelly was re-elected to his council seat on 4 May 2019 with 1,374 first-preference votes.

On 20 May 2023, Donnelly was elected to a third term on the council, topping the poll with 1,868 first-preference votes.
