= 1997 Northern Ireland local elections =

- 21 May 1997

All 582 council seats
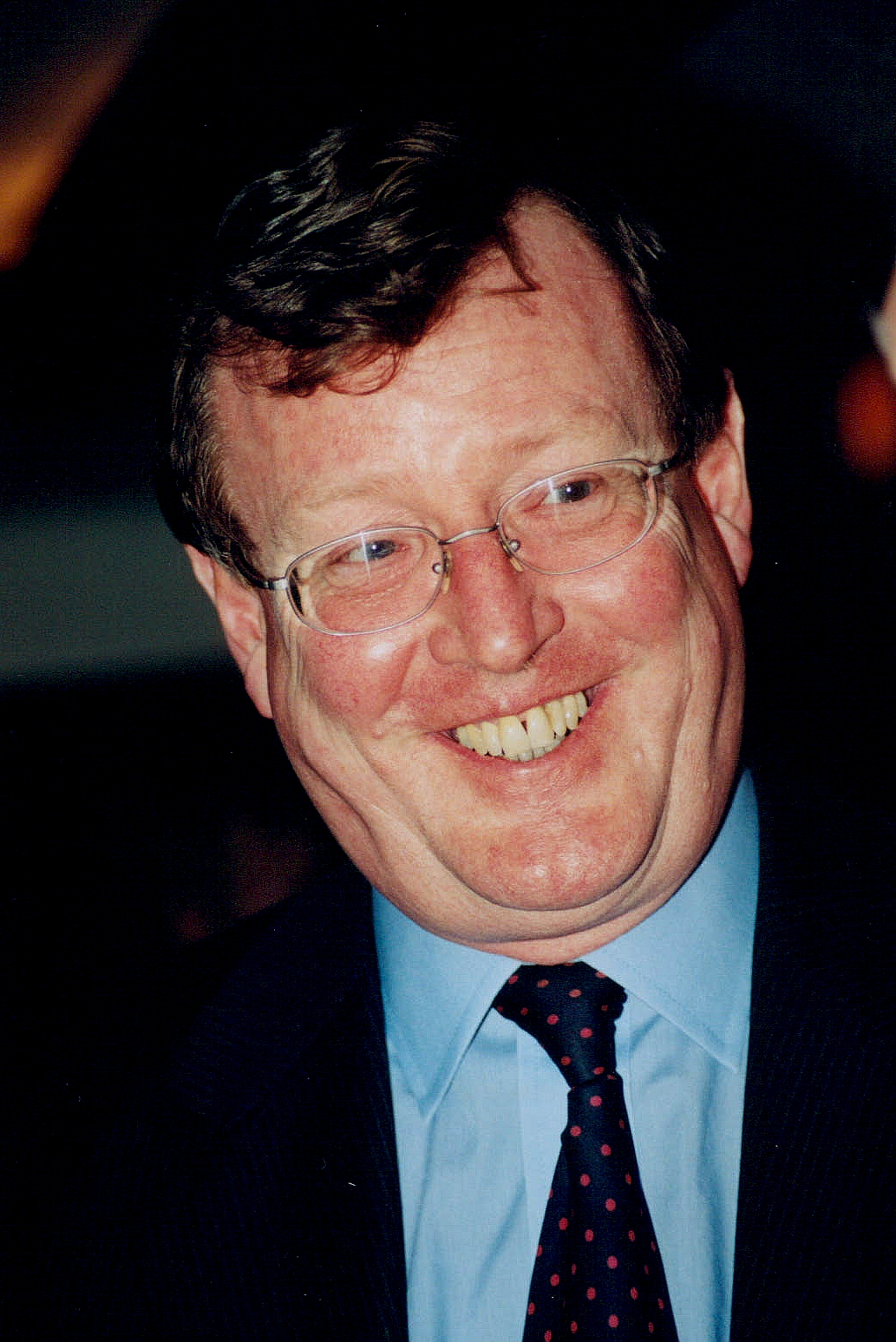

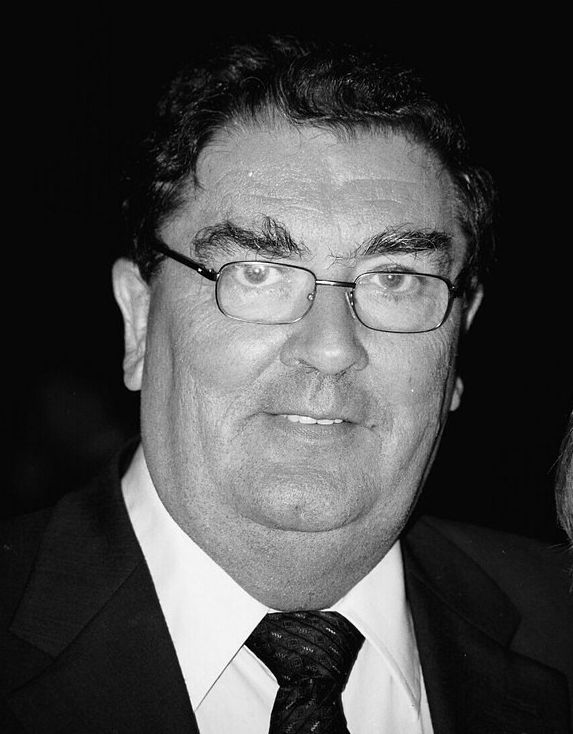

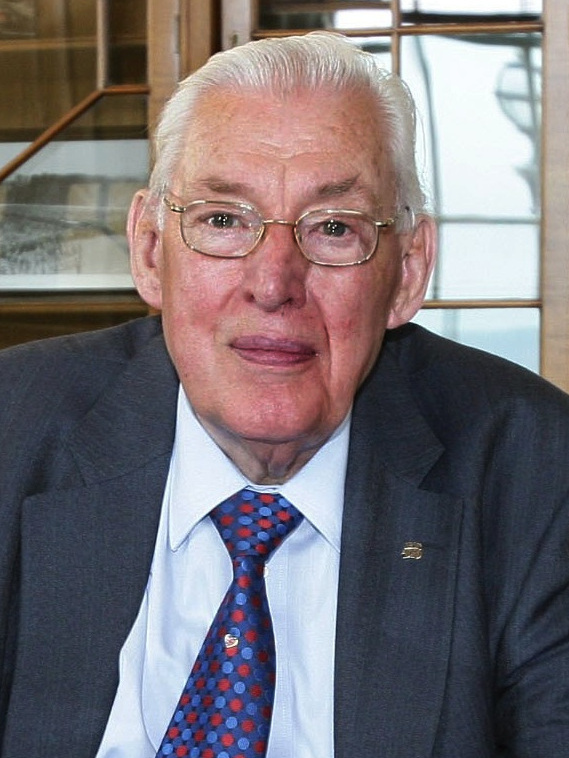

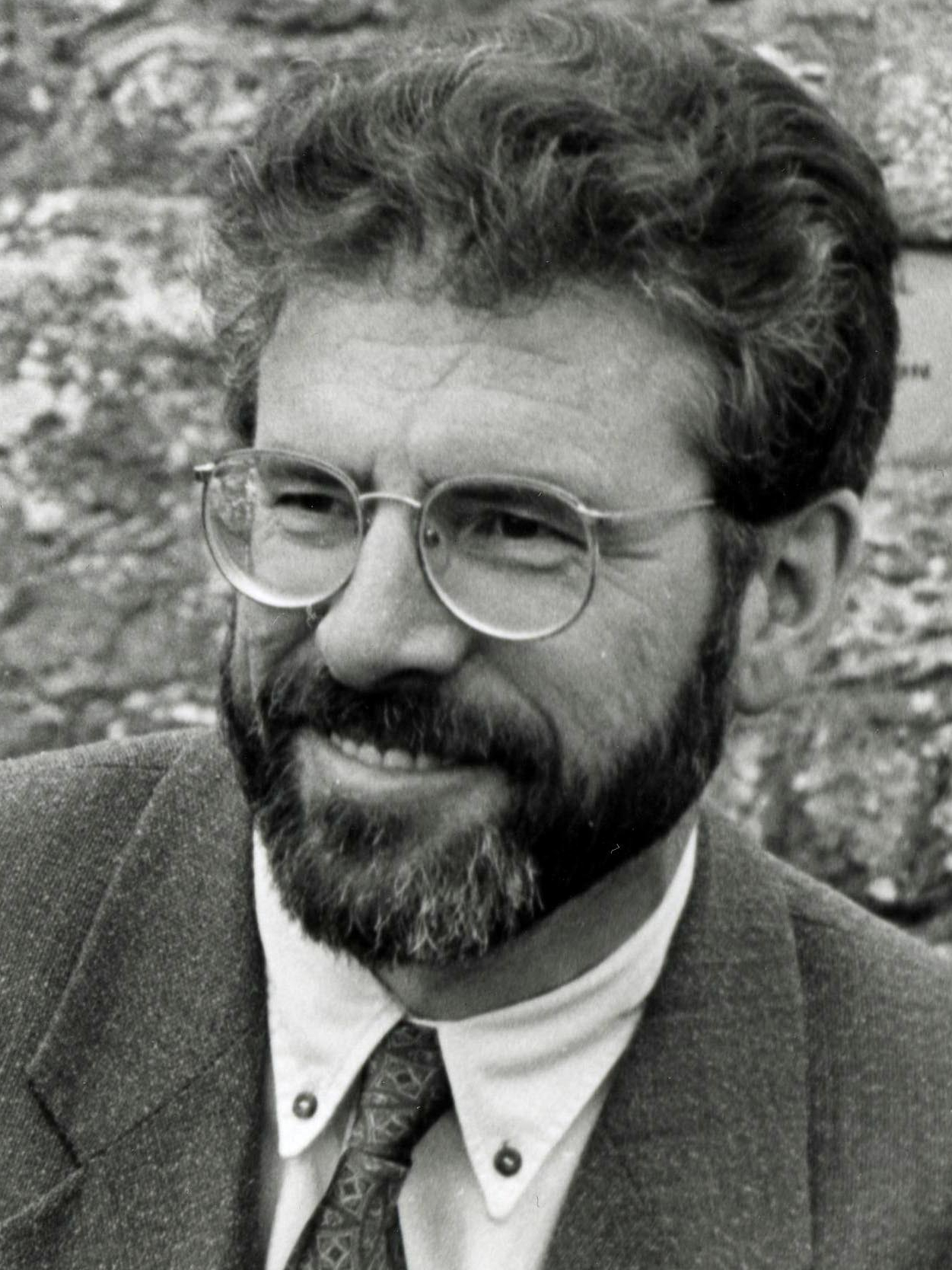

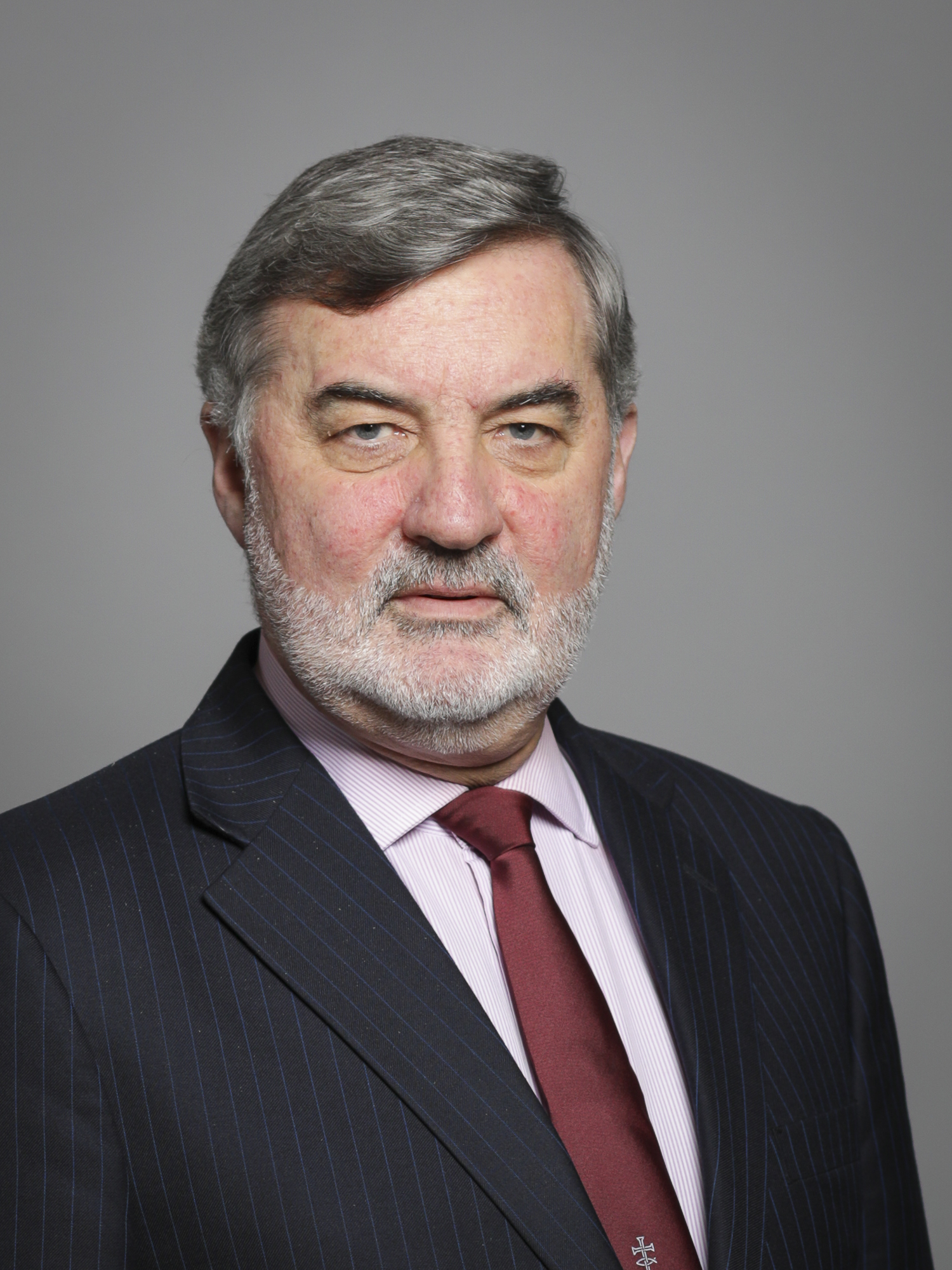

	First party	Second party	Third party
Leader	David Trimble	John Hume	Ian Paisley
Party	UUP	SDLP	DUP
Seats won	185	120	91
Seat change	▼12	▼7	▼12
Popular vote	175,036	130,387	99,651
Percentage	28.1%	21.0%	16.0%
Swing	▼1.2%	▼0.7%	▼1.3%
	Fourth party	Fifth party	Sixth party
Leader	Gerry Adams	John Alderdice	N/A
Party	Sinn Féin	Alliance	Independent
Seats won	74	41	23
Seat change	▲23	▼3	▲3
Popular vote	106,934	41,952	23,695
Percentage	17.2%	6.7%	3.8%
Swing	▲4.9%	▼0.9%	▼0.3%
- Colours denote the winning party with outright control (majority of seats on council)

- Colours denote the party with a plurality of first preference votes in each District Electoral Area (in darker-coloured DEAs, the party has a majority of first preference votes)

Elections for local government were held in Northern Ireland on 21 May 1997, shortly after the 1997 general election across the entire United Kingdom.

== Results ==
Map showing the party that received the most votes by ward.

=== Overall ===
Party	Councillors		Votes	
Party	Total	+/-	% share	Total
UUP	185	—12	28.1	175,036
SDLP	120	―7	21.0	130,387
Sinn Féin	74	+23	17.2	106,934
DUP	91	―12	16.0	99,651
Alliance	41	―3	6.7	41,952
Independent	23	+3	3.8	23,695
PUP	7	+6	2	12,051
Ind. Unionist	15	―6	2	10,376
Ulster Democratic	4	+3	1	6,244
NI Women's Coalition	1	+1	1	3,380
UK Unionist	4	+4	0.5	2,945
Labour coalition	3	+2	0.4	2,774
NI Conservatives	3	―3	0.4	2,634
Ind. Nationalist	3	―1	0.4	2,450
Workers' Party	0	―1	0.4	2,348
Independent Community	2	+2	0.3	1,905
Newtownabbey Ratepayers	2	+2	0.2	1,424
Green (NI)	0	0	0.1	706
Democratic Left	1	0	0.1	560
Community Labour	0	0	0.1	464
Upper Bann Labour	0	0	0.1	353
Ulster Independence	0	0	0.0	71
Natural Law	0	0	0.0	67

=== By council ===
Council	Council Seats by Party												
Council													Total
Council	AP	DUP	PUP	SDLP	SF	UUP	UKUP	UDP	Others	Ind. N	Ind. U	Ind.	Total
Antrim	2	3	–	4	1	9	–	–	–	–	–	–	19
Ards	5	5	–	1	–	10	–	–	–	–	2	–	23
Armagh	–	2	–	7	3	10	–	–	–	–	–	–	22
Ballymena	1	8	–	3	–	10	–	–	–	–	1	–	24
Ballymoney	–	6	–	3	1	4	–	–	–	–	–	2	16
Banbridge	–	3	–	3	–	9	–	–	–	–	–	2	17
Belfast	6	7	3	7	13	13	–	1	–	–	1	–	51
Carrickfergus	5	3	–	–	–	4	–	–	–	–	2	3	17
Castlereagh	4	10	–	2	–	5	1	–	–	–	1	–	23
Coleraine	3	5	–	3	–	10	–	–	–	–	–	1	22
Cookstown	–	2	–	4	5	4	–	–	–	–	1	–	16
Craigavon	1	3	–	7	2	11	–	–	2 INC	–	–	–	26
Derry	–	4	–	14	8	3	–	–	–	–	1	–	30
Down	–	2		12	2	6	–	–	1 NIWC	–	–	1	23
Dungannon	–	3	–	4	5	8	–	–	1 DL	–	–	1	22
Fermanagh	–	2	–	4	5	9	–	–	1 PS	1	–	1	23
Larne	1	3	–	1	–	6	–	–	–	–	–	4	15
Limavady	–	1	–	7	1	6	–	–	–	–	–	–	15
Lisburn	3	2	1	2	4	13	–	2	1 Con	–	2	–	30
Magherafelt	–	3	–	5	5	3	–	–	–	–	–	–	16
Moyle	–	3	–	3	1	3	–	–	–	2	1	2	15
Newry and Mourne	–	1	–	12	8	5	–	–	–	–	–	4	30
Newtownabbey	3	2	1	1	–	10		1	4 (2 NR; 2 Lab)	–	3	–	25
North Down	6	2	2	–	–	6	3	–	2 Con	–	1	3	25
Omagh	1	3	–	6	6	4	–	–	1 Lab	–	–	–	21
Strabane	–	3	–	5	4	3	–	–	–	–	–	1	16
Total	41	91	7	120	74	186	4	4	13	3	15	24	582
Change	-3	-12	+6	-7	+23	-11	+4	+3	–	+3	-6	–	+2 Lab +2 NR +2 INC +1 NIWC +1 PS -3 Con -3 UPUP -1 WP -1 A93
Elected 1993	44	103	1	127	51	197	–	1	13	–	21	24	6 Con 3 UPUP 1 Lab 1 DL 1 WP 1 A93

== Councils ==
=== Antrim ===
Election results, shaded by plurality of First Preference Votes

Antrim North West
Party	Candidate	1st Pref
SDLP	Bobby Loughran	1,115
UUP	James Graham	1,063
DUP	Wilson Clyde	683
Sinn Féin	Henry Cushinan	612
SDLP	Donovan McClelland	430
UUP	Avril Swann	254
Alliance	George Picken	133
Turnout		4,290
No change

Antrim South East
Party	Candidate	1st Pref
UUP	Roy Thompson	996
SDLP	Thomas Burns	963
UUP	Edgar Wallace	763
UUP	Mervyn Rea	716
Alliance	David Ford	613
DUP	Samuel Dunlop	495
DUP	William Harkness	385
PUP	Ken Wilkinson	358
UUP	Roderick Swann	180
SDLP	Lucia Trowlen	177
UUP	Roy Stinson	150
Turnout		5,796
Roy Thompson joins UUP		

Antrim Town
Party	Candidate	1st Pref
UUP	Paddy Marks	1,066
DUP	Robert McClay	642
SDLP	Oran Keenan	514
SDLP	Sean McKee	433
UUP	Adrian Watson	357
UUP	Andrew Ritchie	287
Alliance	Brian McConnell	268
UUP	Andrew Thompson	218
Alliance	Mary Wallace	159
Independent	Stanley Lynn	124
Independent	S. J. Greer	111
Turnout		4,179
No change

=== Ards ===
Election results, shaded by plurality of First Preference Votes

Ards East
Party	Candidate	1st Pref
UUP	Thomas Benson	882
UUP	Ronnie Ferguson	676
DUP	Hamilton Gregory	621
UUP	John Shields	606
UUP	Jeffrey Magill	480
Alliance	Linda Cleland	418
Alliance	Larry Thompson	352
DUP	St Clair McAlister	295
UK Unionist	Tom Sheridan	269
DUP	Hamilton Lawther	251
PUP	Gina McCrory	220
Turnout		5,070
UUP gain from DUP		

Ards Peninsula
Party	Candidate	1st Pref
UUP	Paul Carson	1,114
Alliance	Kieran McCarthy	1,047
DUP	Jim Shannon	993
SDLP	Daniel McCarthy	770
DUP	Robin Drysdale	473
Alliance	John Smyth	221
Alliance	Billy Sheldon	154
SDLP	Iain Bell	131
Green (NI)	Owen Crawford	131
Turnout		4,936
DUP gain from Alliance		

Ards West
Party	Candidate	1st Pref
UUP	Robert Gibson	1,103
UUP	David McNarry	1,066
Alliance	Kathleen Coulter	741
DUP	David Gilmore	635
UUP	Margaret Craig	572
Alliance	Tim McBriar	481
DUP	Lorraine Gilmore	285
Turnout		4,883
No change

Newtownards
Party	Candidate	1st Pref
Ind. Unionist	Wilbert Magill	914
Alliance	Alan McDowell	724
UUP	David Smyth	690
DUP	George Ennis	653
UUP	Tom Hamilton	565
Ind. Unionist	Nancy Orr	327
Ind. Unionist	Bobby McBride	326
DUP	John Purdy	225
PUP	Alfred McCrory	221
Ulster Democratic	Billy McKeown	55
Turnout		4,710
Wilbert Magill leaves DUP		

=== Armagh ===
Election results, shaded by plurality of First Preference Votes

Armagh City
Party	Candidate	1st Pref
SDLP	Pat Brannigan	1,251
UUP	Sylvia McRoberts	898
Sinn Féin	Noel Sheridan	845
Sinn Féin	Sean McGirr	841
UUP	Gordon Frazer	749
SDLP	Anna Brolly	547
SDLP	Michael Carson	531
DUP	Noel Donnelly	529
Alliance	Ryan Williams	167
SDLP	Ann McKenna	146
Turnout		6,504
Sinn Féin gain from SDLP		

Crossmore
Party	Candidate	1st Pref
Sinn Féin	Brian Cunningham	1,207
UUP	Evelyn Corry	1,135
SDLP	Tommy Kavanagh	1,107
SDLP	James McKernan	862
UUP	William Hamilton	747
SDLP	Joseph McGleenan	534
SDLP	James Lennon	509
Turnout		6,101
Sinn Féin gain from SDLP		

Cusher
Party	Candidate	1st Pref
UUP	Eric Speers	1,915
DUP	Heather Black	1,577
SDLP	Tom Canavan	1,057
UUP	Robert Turner	872
UUP	Sharon McClelland	810
UUP	James Clayton	797
Sinn Féin	Thomas Carroll	355
Turnout		7,383
No change

The Orchard
Party	Candidate	1st Pref
UUP	Jim Speers	1,630
DUP	Brian Hutchinson	1,011
SDLP	Joe Campbell	882
UUP	Charles Rollston	836
SDLP	Eamon Mcneill	629
UUP	Olive Whitten	613
Sinn Féin	Liz Gartland	578
Turnout		6,179
No change

=== Ballymena ===
Election results, shaded by plurality of First Preference Votes

Ballymena North
Party	Candidate	1st Pref
SDLP	Patrick McAvoy	975
UUP	William Wright	953
Ind. Unionist	Sam Henry	728
UUP	Joe McKernan	630
DUP	Maurice Mills	610
UUP	James Alexander	547
Alliance	Jayne Dunlop	447
DUP	John Stewart	417
DUP	David Warwick	247
Ind. Unionist	Herbie Parke	235
Turnout		5,789
Sam Henry changes designation from Independent		

Ballymena South
Party	Candidate	1st Pref
SDLP	Declan O'Loan	967
UUP	James Currie	918
DUP	Davy Tweed	832
DUP	Martin Clarke	571
DUP	Hubert Nicholl	534
UUP	Peter Brown	377
UUP	Malcolm Gilmour	365
UUP	John Scott	357
DUP	John Carson	315
Ulster Party	Agnes McLeister	184
Independent	Cowan Balmer	86
Turnout		5,506
UUP gain from Independent Unionist		

Bannside
Party	Candidate	1st Pref
DUP	Roy Gillespie	1,110
DUP	Tommy Nicholl	1,048
UUP	Robert Coulter	1,014
SDLP	Seamus Laverty	967
UUP	Ian Johnston	936
DUP	Sandy Spence	845
Turnout		5,920
No change

Braid
Party	Candidate	1st Pref
SDLP	Margaret Gribben	1,042
UUP	David Clyde	961
UUP	Des Armstrong	816
UUP	Lexie Scott	765
DUP	Sam Gaston	627
DUP	Sam Hanna	623
DUP	David McClintock	490
Turnout		5,324
SDLP gain from UUP		

=== Ballymoney ===
Election results, shaded by plurality of First Preference Votes

Ballymoney Town
Party	Candidate	1st Pref
DUP	Cecil Cousley	493
Independent	Bob McComb	433
UUP	Thomas McKeown	333
DUP	Samuel McConaghie	293
Independent	Bill Williamson	261
SDLP	Joan McCaffrey	255
UUP	James Simpson	242
Independent	Colin McVicker	233
PUP	Jeffrey Balmer	180
NI Women's Coalition	Mary McCusker	31
Turnout		2,754
Independent gain from UUP		

Bann Valley
Party	Candidate	1st Pref
UUP	Joe Gaston	719
SDLP	Malachy McCamphill	706
DUP	Robert Halliday	608
Sinn Féin	Martin O'Neill	508
DUP	Robert Wilson	441
SDLP	Mary McPoland	382
DUP	John Finlay	351
UUP	John Watt	260
Turnout		3,975
Sinn Féin gain from SDLP		

Bushvale
Party	Candidate	1st Pref
SDLP	Harry Connolly	725
DUP	Frank Campbell	473
DUP	Bill Kennedy	443
UUP	William Logan	350
UUP	John Ramsay	341
UUP	William Johnston	222
SDLP	Frank McCluskey	181
NI Women's Coalition	Joan Cosgrove	35
Turnout		2,770
SDLP gain from UUP		

=== Banbridge ===
Election results, shaded by plurality of First Preference Votes

Banbridge Town
Party	Candidate	1st Pref
UUP	Joan Baird	1,438
Independent	Jim Walsh	809
UUP	William Bell	602
DUP	Cyril Vage	581
SDLP	Mel Byrne	534
Alliance	Frank McQuaid	423
UUP	Derick Bell	390
UUP	Ian Burns	359
Turnout		5,215
Jim Walsh leaves SDLP		
DUP gain from UUP		
SDLP gain from Alliance		

Dromore
Party	Candidate	1st Pref
UUP	William McCracken	1,358
DUP	David Herron	770
SDLP	Cassie McDermott	729
UUP	William Martin	709
UUP	Tom Gribben	667
Ind. Unionist	Robert Hill	289
Alliance	Julian Crozier	202
Turnout		4,787
No change

Knockiveagh
Party	Candidate	1st Pref
UUP	John Ingram	1,129
DUP	Wilfred McFadden	1,103
SDLP	Seamus Doyle	946
UUP	John Hanna	799
Independent	Malachy McCartan	692
UUP	Violet Cromie	671
SDLP	Oliver Moore	661
Turnout		6,273
No change

=== Belfast ===
Election results, shaded by plurality of First Preference Votes

Balmoral
Party	Candidate	1st Pref
UUP	Margaret Crooks	2,329
SDLP	Carmel Hanna	1,916
SDLP	Catherine Molloy	1,047
Alliance	Tom Ekin	971
Alliance	Philip McGarry	958
UUP	Bob Stoker	949
DUP	Harry Smith	924
DUP	Joan Parkes	654
Ulster Democratic	Heather Calvert	520
PUP	Gordon McCrea	397
UUP	Gordon Lucy	304
NI Women's Coalition	Nuala Bradley	236
Green (NI)	Mary Ringland	92
NI Conservatives	Hubert Mullan	71
Turnout		11,368
SDLP gain from DUP		

Castle
Party	Candidate	1st Pref
DUP	Nigel Dodds	2,081
SDLP	Alban Maginness	1,781
Alliance	Tom Campbell	1,417
Sinn Féin	Danny Lavery	1,362
UUP	David Browne	1,134
UUP	Nelson McCausland	1,065
UUP	John Carson	1,025
DUP	Jim Crothers Jr	778
SDLP	Jonathan Stephenson	720
Ulster Democratic	Raymond Gilliland	216
NI Women's Coalition	Eileen Calder	149
DUP	Robert Ferris	85
Green (NI)	Alan Warren	73
Workers' Party	Paul Treanor	53
Ulster Independence	Norman McClelland	8
Natural Law	Andrea Gribben	5
Turnout		11,952
Alliance gain from UUP		
Sinn Féin gain from SDLP		

Court
Party	Candidate	1st Pref
PUP	Hugh Smyth	3,070
DUP	Eric Smyth	1,573
Ulster Democratic	Frank McCoubrey	1,200
UUP	Fred Cobain	1,048
UUP	Chris McGimpsey	800
UUP	Glenn Bradley	513
Ind. Unionist	Joe Coggle	407
UUP	Dennis Robinson	237
DUP	Margaret Serris	208
NI Women's Coalition	Linda Walker	150
Alliance	John Roberts	144
Turnout		9,350
UDP gain from Independent Unionist		

Laganbank
Party	Candidate	1st Pref
SDLP	Alasdair McDonnell	1,614
Sinn Féin	Seán Hayes	1,388
UUP	Jim Clarke	1,337
Alliance	Steve McBride	1,118
UUP	Michael McGimpsey	966
SDLP	Peter O'Reilly	902
PUP	Ernie Purves	644
DUP	Jim Kirkpatrick	473
NI Women's Coalition	Anne Campbell	406
Workers' Party	Patrick Lynn	160
Green (NI)	Andrew Frew	138
Natural Law	James Anderson	18
Independent	Vincent McKenna	12
Turnout		9,176
Sinn Féin gain from SDLP		

Lower Falls
Party	Candidate	1st Pref
Sinn Féin	Fra McCann	2,420
Sinn Féin	Seán McKnight	2,286
Sinn Féin	Tom Hartley	2,022
Sinn Féin	Marie Moore	1,810
SDLP	Margaret Walsh	1,764
Sinn Féin	Janice Austin	1,274
Workers' Party	John Lowry	468
SDLP	Mary White	227
Alliance	Keith Jacques	45
Turnout		12,316
No change

Oldpark
Party	Candidate	1st Pref
Sinn Féin	Mick Conlon	2,317
Sinn Féin	Bobby Lavery	2,230
SDLP	Martin Morgan	1,941
Sinn Féin	Paddy McManus	1,773
PUP	Billy Hutchinson	1,582
UUP	Fred Proctor	1,316
UUP	Fred Rodgers	986
DUP	David Smylie	659
Ulster Democratic	Paddy Bird	427
SDLP	Dympna O'Hara	365
Green (NI)	Peter Emerson	245
Alliance	Mark Long	177
Workers' Party	Steven Doran	109
Turnout		14,127
PUP gain from UUP		

Pottinger
Party	Candidate	1st Pref
DUP	Sammy Wilson	2,265
UUP	Reg Empey	2,309
PUP	David Ervine	2,110
Sinn Féin	Dominic Corr	978
Alliance	Mervyn Jones	870
UUP	Margaret Clarke	768
DUP	Robert Clelland	605
SDLP	Marga Foley	309
PUP	Alexander Gordon	262
UUP	Andrew Muers	251
Ulster Democratic	Robert Girvan	169
NI Women's Coalition	Pearl Sagar	149
DUP	Frank Leslie	142
Workers' Party	Joseph Bell	115
Ulster Independence	Josephine Challis	21
Natural Law	David Collins	19
Independent Labour	Sean McGouran	19
Turnout		11,361
PUP gain from DUP		

Upper Falls
Party	Candidate	1st Pref
SDLP	Alex Attwood	2,855
Sinn Féin	Alex Maskey	2,807
Sinn Féin	Michael Browne	2,580
Sinn Féin	Martin Livingstone	2,394
Sinn Féin	Chrissie McAuley	1,738
SDLP	Stephen McGowan	616
SDLP	Patricia Lewsley	596
DUP	David McNerlin	201
Workers' Party	James McAllister	110
Alliance	Dan McGuinness	85
Turnout		13,982
Sinn Féin gain from SDLP		

Victoria
Party	Candidate	1st Pref
Alliance	David Alderdice	2,419
UUP	Ian Adamson	2,367
UUP	Jim Rodgers	1,508
DUP	Wallace Browne	1,485
DUP	Robin Newton	1,036
Alliance	Danny Dow	1,024
DUP	John McQuillan	915
Alliance	Glyn Roberts	553
DUP	Margaret McKenzie	523
Ind. Unionist	Alan Crowe	519
NI Conservatives	Lesley Donaldson	256
UUP	Peter Weir	192
Natural Law	Thomas Mullins	25
Turnout		12,822
Independent Unionist gain from UUP		

=== Carrickfergus ===
Election results, shaded by plurality of First Preference Votes

Carrick Castle
Party	Candidate	1st Pref
Alliance	Sean Neeson	741
DUP	David Hilditch	626
Independent	William Hamilton	494
UUP	Samuel McCamley	466
Independent	Nicholas Wady	233
PUP	Samuel Stewart	144
Alliance	Arthur McQuitty	54
Turnout		2,758
Independent gain from Alliance		

Kilroot
Party	Candidate	1st Pref
Ind. Unionist	James Brown	908
Alliance	Janet Crampsey	554
Independent	Samuel Crowe	553
Alliance	Robin Cavan	531
UUP	Eric Ferguson	371
UUP	Colin McAuley	362
DUP	William Ashe	357
DUP	Desmond Robinson	261
PUP	Billy Donaldson	237
Independent	Norman Dixon	127
Turnout		4,261
James Brown leaves UUP		
Samuel Crowe leaves NI Conservatives		
DUP gain from Independent		

Knockagh Monument
Party	Candidate	1st Pref
Alliance	Stewart Dickson	867
UUP	Thomas Creighton	754
DUP	May Beattie	580
Independent	Charles Johnston	457
UUP	Joseph Reid	377
DUP	William Haggan	336
Alliance	Noreen McIlwrath	209
PUP	Carolyn Howarth	121
Turnout		3,764
No change

=== Castlereagh ===
Election results, shaded by plurality of First Preference Votes

Castlereagh Central
Party	Candidate	1st Pref
DUP	Peter Robinson	2,783
UUP	Alan Carson	854
Alliance	Patrick Mitchell	600
UK Unionist	Grant Dillon	267
SDLP	Dominic Marsella	224
Alliance	Ann Smith	134
DUP	John Dunn	87
DUP	John Norris	61
UUP	Alwyn McClernon	23
Turnout		5,033
Grant Dillon joins UKUP		

Castlereagh East
Party	Candidate	1st Pref
DUP	Iris Robinson	2,787
Alliance	Peter Osborne	677
UUP	Sarah Cummings	672
Ind. Unionist	William Abraham	607
Alliance	Michael Long	466
Ulster Democratic	Blakeley McNally	303
DUP	Thomas Jeffers	172
DUP	Sandy Geddis	160
Independent	David Brown	115
DUP	Kim Morton	73
DUP	Sarah Seddon	16
Turnout		6,048
Thomas Jeffers leaves UPUP		

Castlereagh South
Party	Candidate	1st Pref
UUP	John Beattie	1,219
DUP	Myreve Chambers	1,146
SDLP	Arthur Hegney	864
Alliance	Geraldine Rice	628
Alliance	Margaret Marshall	556
UUP	Michael Henderson	325
DUP	Andrew Ramsey	205
Turnout		4,943
SDLP gain from Alliance		

Castlereagh West
Party	Candidate	1st Pref
DUP	William Clulow	952
UUP	Cecil Hall	744
Alliance	Sara Duncan	697
SDLP	Rosaleen Hughes	619
DUP	Simon Robinson	607
PUP	Samuel Johnston	367
UUP	Marie Luney	274
Ind. Unionist	Ernest Harper	267
DUP	Thomas Scott	142
Alliance	Malcolm Gilmore	140
Turnout		4,809
SDLP gain from UUP		

=== Coleraine ===
Election results, shaded by plurality of First Preference Votes

Bann
Party	Candidate	1st Pref
SDLP	John Dallat	1,234
UUP	Olive Church	1,023
UUP	Jim Watt	990
UUP	William King	855
DUP	Robert Bolton	658
SDLP	Eamon Mullan	642
DUP	James McCloskey	522
Alliance	Ian McEwan	152
Turnout		6,076
No change

Coleraine Central
Party	Candidate	1st Pref
UUP	David McClarty	1,255
DUP	James McClure	941
SDLP	Gerald McLaughlin	729
UUP	David Barbour	529
UUP	Elizabeth Johnston	438
Alliance	Eamon O'Hara	300
UUP	Daniel Christie	291
DUP	Marie McAllister	277
Alliance	Yvonne Boyle	214
NI Women's Coalition	Averil Watson	58
Turnout		5,032
No change

Coleraine East
Party	Candidate	1st Pref
DUP	Maurice Bradley	833
UUP	Elizabeth Black	606
DUP	William Creelman	464
Alliance	Bill Matthews	413
UUP	Robert McPherson	355
Independent	David Gilmour	283
Independent	Martin Hunter	201
UUP	Gary Wolfe	161
Independent	Trevor Cooke	125
Turnout		3,441
Alliance gain from UUP		

The Skerries
Party	Candidate	1st Pref
UUP	Pauline Armitage	841
Independent	Christine Alexander	784
SDLP	Patricia Farren	486
UUP	Norman Hillis	470
DUP	Robert Stewart	447
UUP	Samuel Kane	425
Alliance	Barbara Dempsey	359
Alliance	Patrick McGowan	300
DUP	James Milliken	259
Independent	Thomas Mackay	46
Turnout		4,417
Independent gain from UUP		

=== Cookstown ===
Election results, shaded by plurality of First Preference Votes

Ballinderry
Party	Candidate	1st Pref
SDLP	Patsy McGlone	1,555
Sinn Féin	Pearse McAleer	1,518
DUP	Anne McCrea	976
UUP	William Armstrong	735
UUP	Walter Greer	618
DUP	Samuel McCartney	519
SDLP	Mary Baker	497
Sinn Féin	Seamus Campbell	497
Ind. Nationalist	Francis Rocks	53
Turnout		6,968
Sinn Féin gain from UUP		

Cookstown Central
Party	Candidate	1st Pref
UUP	Trevor Wilson	1,427
Sinn Féin	Sean Begley	1,172
DUP	William John Larmour	863
SDLP	Denis Haughey	855
SDLP	Peggy Laverty	487
UUP	William Joseph Larmour	221
DUP	Raymond McGarvey	189
Turnout		5,214
Sinn Féin gain from SDLP		

Drum Manor
Party	Candidate	1st Pref
Sinn Féin	Sean Begley	1,446
UUP	Samuel Glasgow	1,173
Ind. Unionist	Samuel Parke	741
SDLP	James McGarvey	696
DUP	William Cuddy	686
SDLP	Peter Cassidy	376
Sinn Féin	John McNamee	293
Turnout		5,411
Sinn Féin gain from DUP		

=== Craigavon ===
Election results, shaded by plurality of First Preference Votes

Craigavon Central
Party	Candidate	1st Pref
UUP	Kenneth Twyble	1,576
DUP	William Allen	1,079
Sinn Féin	Francis Murray	1,048
SDLP	Pat Mallon	1,008
UUP	James McCammick	737
UUP	Frederick Crowe	722
Alliance	Sean Hagan	541
Community Labour	Alan Evans	389
UUP	Cyril McLoughlin	377
SDLP	Philip Mallon	182
NI Women's Coalition	Chris Moffat	84
Workers' Party	Peter Smyth	55
Community Labour	William McAvoy	25
Turnout		7,823
No change

Loughside
Party	Candidate	1st Pref
Sinn Féin	John O'Dowd	2,320
SDLP	Sean McKavanagh	1,499
SDLP	Dolores Kelly	692
SDLP	Mary McAlinden	562
UUP	John Crozier	471
SDLP	Kieran McGeown	339
Workers' Party	Tom French	226
Upper Bann Labour	Hugh Casey	203
Upper Bann Labour	Mark McKavanagh	101
DUP	Anne Hanlon	89
Alliance	Adrian McKinney	62
Community Labour	Mary Sheen	14
Turnout		6,578
SDLP gain from Workers' Party		

Lurgan
Party	Candidate	1st Pref
UUP	Sam Gardiner	1,802
UUP	George Savage	1,371
DUP	Ruth Allen	803
UUP	Meta Crozier	691
UUP	Jonathan Bell	655
DUP	Frederick Baird	623
SDLP	Mary McNally	614
UUP	Sydney Cairns	434
Alliance	Wilson Freeburn	390
Sinn Féin	Bernadette O'Hagan	349
UUP	William McCullough	230
Upper Bann Labour	Gillian Kirk	49
Community Labour	James Devlin	17
Turnout		8,028
Sydney Cairns joins UUP		

Portadown
Party	Candidate	1st Pref
DUP	Mervyn Carrick	1,713
Ind. Nationalist	Breandan MacCionnaith	1,493
UUP	James Gillespie	1,203
UUP	Joe Trueman	919
SDLP	Ignatius Fox	890
UUP	Mark Neale	515
Ind. Nationalist	Joe Duffy	412
UUP	David Thompson	404
Alliance	William Ramsay	373
DUP	John Tate	132
Community Labour	Carol Lindsay	19
Turnout		8,073
Independent Nationalist gain from DUP and Alliance		

=== Derry ===
Election results, shaded by plurality of First Preference Votes

Cityside
Party	Candidate	1st Pref
Sinn Féin	Cathal Crumley	1,333
Sinn Féin	Mitchel McLaughlin	1,307
SDLP	James Clifford	969
Sinn Féin	Peter Anderson	952
SDLP	Patrick Devine	829
SDLP	Pat Ramsey	822
NI Women's Coalition	Margaret Logue	255
Turnout		6,467
Sinn Féin gain from SDLP		

Northland
Party	Candidate	1st Pref
SDLP	Mark Durkan	1,679
Sinn Féin	Mary Nelis	1,564
Sinn Féin	Marian Hutcheon	1,128
SDLP	Martin Bradley	1,115
SDLP	John Tierney	1,096
SDLP	Kathleen McCloskey	854
SDLP	John Kerr	850
Sinn Féin	Pious McNaught	572
Independent	Alister Simpson	532
NI Women's Coalition	Patricia McAdams	290
Labour	Tony Martin	50
Labour	Geraldine O'Neill	46
Turnout		9,776
No change

Rural
Party	Candidate	1st Pref
SDLP	Annie Courtney	1,220
DUP	William Hay	1,105
SDLP	Seamus McNickle	976
UUP	Andrew Davidson	833
DUP	Maurice Devenney	741
SDLP	George Peoples	739
DUP	Ernie Hamilton	730
Sinn Féin	Paul Fleming	707
SDLP	Jim McKeever	549
NI Women's Coalition	Catherine Cooke	180
Independent	David Hawthorne	48
Turnout		7,828
UUP gain from DUP		

Shantallow
Party	Candidate	1st Pref
SDLP	Mary Bradley	1,826
Sinn Féin	Tony Hasson	1,290
Sinn Féin	Gearoid O'Heara	1,134
SDLP	William O'Connell	1,027
SDLP	Shaun Gallagher	872
SDLP	Margaret McCartney	779
Sinn Féin	Bernadette McDaid	504
Labour	Charles McDaid	195
NI Women's Coalition	Diane Greer	165
DUP	William Dougherty	134
Labour	Robert Lindsay	41
Labour	Patrick Muldowney	16
Turnout		7,983
Sinn Féin gain from SDLP		

Waterside
Party	Candidate	1st Pref
UUP	Richard Dallas	1,535
DUP	Gregory Campbell	1,497
SDLP	Philip Kelly	1,051
Sinn Féin	Lynn Fleming	903
SDLP	Wilfred White	759
DUP	Joe Miller	749
Ind. Unionist	James Guy	671
DUP	Mildred Garfield	517
UUP	May Hamilton	497
DUP	Bill Irwin	443
Ulster Democratic	David Nicholl	276
NI Women's Coalition	Helena Schlindwein	146
Independent	Ken Adams	86
Independent	Gerry Toland	22
Turnout		9,152
Sinn Féin gain from SDLP		

=== Down ===
Election results, shaded by plurality of First Preference Votes

Ballynahinch
Party	Candidate	1st Pref
DUP	Billy Alexander	1,362
SDLP	Patrick Toman	1,197
UUP	Harvey Bicker	990
SDLP	Anne McAleenan	951
SDLP	Frances Casement	409
UUP	John Reid	325
Sinn Féin	John Smyth	234
Turnout		5,468
SDLP gain from UUP		

Downpatrick
Party	Candidate	1st Pref
SDLP	John Doris	991
SDLP	Peter Craig	918
UUP	Jack McIlheron	802
SDLP	Dermot Curran	748
Sinn Féin	Patrick McGreevy	659
SDLP	Owen Adams	477
Alliance	Michael Healy	431
SDLP	Gerard Mahon	417
Labour	Patrick O'Connor	251
SDLP	John Irvine	189
Green (NI)	Keith Bradford	113
Workers' Party	Desmond O'Hagan	57
Labour	Edna Furey	41
Labour	Michael Kearney	35
Turnout		6,129
Sinn Féin gain from SDLP		

Newcastle
Party	Candidate	1st Pref
SDLP	Eamon O'Neill	913
Sinn Féin	Frank McDowell	831
UUP	Gerald Douglas	773
SDLP	Carmel O'Boyle	715
SDLP	Peter Fitzpatrick	706
DUP	Stanley Priestly	552
NI Women's Coalition	Anne Carr	430
SDLP	Frances Flynn	422
UUP	Ronald Richie	259
Alliance	Adrienne Healy	167
Workers' Party	Edward O'Hagan	75
Turnout		5,843
Sinn Féin gain from SDLP		
Women's Coalition gain from DUP		

Rowallane
Party	Candidate	1st Pref
SDLP	Margaret Ritchie	1,044
UUP	Samuel Osborne	846
UUP	Albert Colmer	817
DUP	William Dick	810
UUP	William Biggerstaff	695
Ind. Unionist	Billy Walker	521
SDLP	Laurence Moffat	384
Alliance	Barry Corscadden	252
Turnout		5,369
No change

=== Dungannon ===
Election results, shaded by plurality of First Preference Votes

Blackwater
Party	Candidate	1st Pref
SDLP	Patsy Daly	950
Sinn Féin	Michelle Gildernew	920
UUP	Jim Hamilton	905
UUP	Derek Irwin	858
UUP	Jim Brady	799
DUP	James Ewing	596
DUP	Robert McFarland	453
DUP	Anthony Fox	447
Turnout		5,928
No change

Clogher Valley
Party	Candidate	1st Pref
UUP	Noel Mulligan	1,097
SDLP	Anthony McGonnell	1,083
Sinn Féin	Seamus Flanagan	1,028
DUP	Johnston McIlwrath	989
UUP	Robert Mulligan	857
SDLP	Margaret Monaghan	499
Sinn Féin	Brian Kilpatrick	339
Turnout		5,892
No change

Dungannon Town
Party	Candidate	1st Pref
Sinn Féin	Vincent Kelly	1,065
DUP	Maurice Morrow	955
UUP	Joan Carson	940
UUP	John Reilly	777
SDLP	Vincent Currie	651
Democratic Left	Gerry Cullen	412
Sinn Féin	Edward Devlin	291
Alliance	Ephrem Bogues	269
SDLP	Peggy Devlin	170
Turnout		5,530
No change

Torrent
Party	Candidate	1st Pref
Sinn Féin	Francie Molloy	1,407
UUP	Norman Badger	1,212
Ind. Nationalist	Jim Canning	1,183
Sinn Féin	Michael Gillespie	1,017
SDLP	Jim Cavanagh	832
Sinn Féin	Brendan Doris	822
Sinn Féin	Jim O'Donnell	493
SDLP	Joe Gervin	283
Turnout		7,249
No change

=== Fermanagh ===
Election results, shaded by plurality of First Preference Votes

Enniskillen
Party	Candidate	1st Pref
UUP	Samuel Foster	2,055
Sinn Féin	Gerry McHugh	1,313
SDLP	Eamon Flanagan	927
UUP	Raymond Ferguson	769
UUP	Basil Johnston	685
Progressive Socialist	David Kettyles	581
DUP	Joe Dodds	581
SDLP	John Rooney	267
UUP	Ethel Gregg	175
DUP	Robert Irvine	160
Alliance	John Haslett	156
NI Women's Coalition	Margaret McCaffrey	143
Turnout		7,812
No change

Erne East
Party	Candidate	1st Pref
UUP	Harold Andrews	1,149
Sinn Féin	Ruth Lynch	1,073
UUP	Cecil Noble	932
Sinn Féin	Brian McCaffrey	918
Ind. Nationalist	Tony McPhillips	909
SDLP	Fergus McQuillan	897
UUP	Jean McVitty	886
Sinn Féin	Thomas O'Reilly	694
DUP	Paul Robinson	369
SDLP	Marie O'Neill	355
Turnout		8,182
Sinn Féin gain from UUP		

Erne North
Party	Candidate	1st Pref
UUP	Caldwell McClaughry	998
DUP	Bert Johnston	951
SDLP	Tommy Gallagher	933
UUP	Bertie Kerr	917
UUP	Thomas Elliott	848
Sinn Féin	Geraldine Cassidy	730
SDLP	John Dolan	526
Alliance	Neville McElderry	98
DUP	Jean Jackson	62
Turnout		6,063
Sinn Féin gain from SDLP		

Erne West
Party	Candidate	1st Pref
UUP	Wilson Elliott	1,616
Independent	Patrick McCaffrey	1,250
Sinn Féin	Robin Martin	1,179
SDLP	Gerard Gallagher	1,071
Sinn Féin	Stephen Huggett	863
UUP	Derrick Nixon	612
NI Women's Coalition	Amelda Maguire	176
Turnout		6,767
No change

=== Larne ===
Election results, shaded by plurality of First Preference Votes

Coast Road
Party	Candidate	1st Pref
UUP	Thomas Robinson	527
Ind. Nationalist	William Cunning	502
UUP	Joan Drummond	473
SDLP	Daniel O'Connor	409
Alliance	Amelia Kelly	317
DUP	Winston Fulton	314
DUP	Rachel Rea	313
DUP	Trevor Robinson	155
Independent	Norman McCann	73
Turnout		3,083
SDLP gain from Alliance		

Larne Lough
Party	Candidate	1st Pref
UUP	Roy Beggs	1,043
Alliance	John Mathews	526
DUP	Bobby McKee	369
DUP	Samuel McAllister	300
UUP	John Hall	297
UUP	David Fleck	265
UUP	Alexander Hunter	240
DUP	Sharon Gardiner	174
PUP	George Ferguson	116
Turnout		3,330
Alliance gain from DUP		

Larne Town
Party	Candidate	1st Pref
Independent	Desmond Nixon	698
DUP	Jack McKee	663
UUP	Rosalie Armstrong	485
Independent	Lindsay Mason	462
Independent	Roy Craig	352
Alliance	Patricia Kay	336
UUP	Mary Steele	202
DUP	Gregg McKeen	91
Turnout		3,289
Independent gain from UUP and Alliance		

=== Limavady ===
Election results, shaded by plurality of First Preference Votes

Bellarena
Party	Candidate	1st Pref
UUP	Stanley Gault	839
SDLP	Michael Carten	814
SDLP	Arthur Doherty	798
UUP	Ian Grant	765
SDLP	John McKinney	714
DUP	Robert Glass	453
Turnout		4,383
No change

Benbradagh
Party	Candidate	1st Pref
UUP	Boyd Douglas	1,072
SDLP	Michael Coyle	1,013
Sinn Féin	Malachy O'Kane	876
SDLP	John Lynch	442
UUP	Max Gault	409
Sinn Féin	Eddie Lynn	368
Turnout		4,180
No change

Limavady Town
Party	Candidate	1st Pref
DUP	George Robinson	837
SDLP	Desmond Lowry	759
SDLP	Barry Doherty	739
UUP	Jack Dolan	738
UUP	Ronald Cartwright	729
UUP	Norman Reynolds	484
DUP	Victor Wilson	157
NI Women's Coalition	Paula Taylor	88
Turnout		4,531
No change

=== Lisburn ===
Election results, shaded by plurality of First Preference Votes

Downshire
Party	Candidate	1st Pref
UUP	Edmund Falloon	1,328
DUP	Charles Poots	1,041
Alliance	Betty Campbell	902
NI Conservatives	William Bleakes	846
DUP	David Craig	441
UUP	William Moore	389
UUP	Ken Hull	352
Turnout		5,299
Alliance gain from UUP		

Dunmurry Cross
Party	Candidate	1st Pref
Sinn Féin	Michael Ferguson	1,365
Sinn Féin	Paul Butler	1,260
Sinn Féin	Sue Ramsey	1,025
UUP	Billy Bell	963
SDLP	William McDonnell	928
Sinn Féin	Maria Gray	777
Ind. Nationalist	Hugh Lewsley	502
SDLP	Geraldine Rodgers	501
UUP	Frederick Parkinson	474
UUP	Andrew Park	330
Alliance	Owen Gawith	284
DUP	Yvonne Craig	236
Workers' Party	Frances McCarthy	192
Turnout		8,837
Sinn Féin gain from UUP		
Hugh Lewsley leaves SDLP		

Killultagh
Party	Candidate	1st Pref
UUP	Jim Dillon	1,432
SDLP	Peter O'Hagan	931
DUP	Cecil Calvert	904
UUP	Kenneth Watson	591
UUP	David Greene	551
Alliance	Trevor Lunn	489
DUP	James Tinsley	412
NI Women's Coalition	Sybil Moses	150
Turnout		5,460
No change

Lisburn Town North
Party	Candidate	1st Pref
UUP	William Lewis	1,237
Alliance	Fraser McCammond	951
Ind. Unionist	Ronnie Crawford	810
Ulster Democratic	David Adams	748
Protestant Unionist	William Beattie	671
UUP	William Gardiner-Watson	652
Alliance	William Whitley	495
UUP	Lorraine Martin	408
DUP	Eleanor Calvert	401
DUP	James Tinsley	294
Ind. Unionist	Anne Blake	258
UUP	Noel Malcolm	99
NI Conservatives	Leonard Jarvis	89
Turnout		7,113
UDP gain from UUP		
William Beattie leaves DUP		

Lisburn Town South
Party	Candidate	1st Pref
UUP	Ivan Davis	1,469
Alliance	Seamus Close	1,067
Ulster Democratic	Gary McMichael	750
UUP	David Archer	578
DUP	Stuart Deignan	510
UUP	Joseph Lockhart	454
UUP	George Morrison	387
Ulster Democratic	Philip Dean	117
UUP	Margaret Little	105
NI Women's Coalition	Bronya Bonar	59
Turnout		5,496
No change

=== Magherafelt ===
Election results, shaded by plurality of First Preference Votes

Magherafelt Town
Party	Candidate	1st Pref
DUP	William McCrea	2,675
Sinn Féin	Seamus O'Brien	1,777
SDLP	Patrick Kilpatrick	1,149
UUP	George Shiels	816
SDLP	Joseph McBride	499
DUP	Paul McLean	107
Labour	Harry Hutchinson	73
Workers' Party	Marian Donnelly	37
Turnout		7,133
No change

Moyola
Party	Candidate	1st Pref
Sinn Féin	Margaret McKenna	1,180
Sinn Féin	Paul Henry	949
UUP	John Junkin	882
DUP	Thomas Catherwood	829
SDLP	Patrick McErlean	727
DUP	James Wilson	541
SDLP	Francis Kearney	468
UUP	Norman Montgomery	362
Ind. Unionist	James Mulholland	250
Workers' Party	Patrick Scullion	53
Turnout		6,241
Sinn Féin gain from DUP		

Sperrin
Party	Candidate	1st Pref
Sinn Féin	Patrick Groogan	1,801
Sinn Féin	John Kelly	1,602
SDLP	Kathleen Lagan	1,170
UUP	Robert Montgomery	810
DUP	Rodney Mitchell	658
SDLP	Francis McKendry	515
Workers' Party	Francis Donnelly	103
Green (NI)	Jude Stephens	12
Turnout		6,671
No change

=== Moyle ===
Election results, shaded by plurality of First Preference Votes

Ballycastle
Party	Candidate	1st Pref
Independent	Seamus Blaney	551
SDLP	Richard Kerr	483
DUP	Gardiner Kane	356
UUP	Helen Harding	283
Independent	Christopher McCaughan	221
DUP	Elizabeth Brennan	14
Turnout		1,908
No change

Giant's Causeway
Party	Candidate	1st Pref
Ind. Unionist	Price McConaghy	484
DUP	David McAllister	278
UUP	William Graham	263
DUP	George Hartin	237
UUP	Robert McIlroy	176
UUP	Raymond Rodgers	126
DUP	Alan Mulholland	93
Christian	Thomas Palmer	22
Turnout		1,679
Robert McIlroy joins Ulster Unionists		

The Glens
Party	Candidate	1st Pref
Ind. Republican	Oliver McMullan	711
Sinn Féin	James McCarry	454
SDLP	Malachy McSparran	404
SDLP	Archie McIntosh	316
Ind. Nationalist	Randal McDonnell	223
DUP	Thomas Brennan	218
SDLP	Anna Edwards	162
Turnout		2,488
No change

=== Newry and Mourne ===
Election results, shaded by plurality of First Preference Votes

Crotlieve
Party	Candidate	1st Pref
SDLP	Peadar Bradley	1,503
Sinn Féin	Mick Murphy	1,423
SDLP	Hugh Carr	975
UUP	Gordon Heslip	893
Independent	Anthony Williamson	861
SDLP	Josephine O'Hare	762
Independent	Ciaran Mussen	752
SDLP	Jim McCart	716
SDLP	Marietta Farrell	356
Alliance	Lindsay Whitcroft	219
Turnout		8,460
Sinn Féin gain from UUP		

Newry Town
Party	Candidate	1st Pref
Sinn Féin	Davy Hyland	1,095
Independent	Jackie Patterson	1,030
Sinn Féin	Brendan Curran	1,000
Independent	Eugene Markey	929
SDLP	Patrick McElroy	807
SDLP	Frank Feely	774
UUP	William McCaigue	727
Sinn Féin	Anne-Marie Willis	529
SDLP	Arthur Ruddy	528
SDLP	Mary McKeown	491
Alliance	Peter Whitcroft	181
Turnout		8,091
Independent gain from SDLP		

Slieve Gullion
Party	Candidate	1st Pref
SDLP	John Fee	1,412
Sinn Féin	Patrick Brennan	1,148
Sinn Féin	Patrick McDonald	1,114
Sinn Féin	Pat McNamee	1,108
SDLP	Pat Toner	845
SDLP	Dessie McDonnell	647
Turnout		6,274
Sinn Féin gain from SDLP		

The Fews
Party	Candidate	1st Pref
UUP	Danny Kennedy	1,610
Sinn Féin	Brendan Lewis	1,103
SDLP	Stephen McGinn	1,018
SDLP	Charles Smyth	975
UUP	William Moffett	952
Sinn Féin	Jimmy McCreesh	883
SDLP	James Savage	690
Turnout		7,231
Sinn Féin gain from SDLP		

The Mournes
Party	Candidate	1st Pref
UUP	Isaac Hanna	1,595
UUP	Henry Reilly	1,303
SDLP	Emmett Haughian	1,196
DUP	William Burns	907
SDLP	Michael Cunningham	895
Sinn Féin	Paul Lawless	471
Alliance	Anne Cunningham	353
Independent	Ewan Atkinson	102
Workers' Party	Henry Cunningham	78
Turnout		6,900
No change

=== Newtownabbey ===
Election results, shaded by plurality of First Preference Votes

Antrim Line
Party	Candidate	1st Pref
SDLP	Tommy McTeague	1,500
UUP	Edward Crilly	1,329
UUP	Arthur Kell	752
DUP	Liz Snoddy	647
UUP	Ivan Hunter	536
Alliance	James Rooney	493
Newtownabbey Ratepayers' Association	John Blair	462
Ind. Unionist	Arthur Templeton	442
Ulster Democratic	Billy Blair	382
Alliance	Tommy Frazer	336
Turnout		6,875
UUP gain from Independent Unionist		
NRA gain from Alliance		

Ballyclare
Party	Candidate	1st Pref
UUP	Jim Bingham	847
DUP	Paul Girvan	705
Alliance	Pat McCudden	586
UUP	Vera McWilliams	477
UUP	Ed Turkington	362
Ind. Unionist	Sidney Cameron	262
Newtownabbey Ratepayers' Association	Etta Mann	259
PUP	Norman Lavery	225
Ulster Democratic	Dave Burgess	137
Ind. Unionist	Thomas Porter	95
Turnout		3,955
Alliance gain from Independent Unionist		

Macedon
Party	Candidate	1st Pref
Newtownabbey Labour Party	Mark Langhammer	1,103
Ind. Unionist	Andrew Beattie	595
UUP	David Hollis	539
Newtownabbey Ratepayers' Association	Billy Webb	477
DUP	Billy Snoddy	470
Ulster Democratic	Tommy Kirkham	442
Newtownabbey Labour Party	Robert Kidd	393
PUP	Bob Gourley	372
UUP	Richard Walker	278
UK Unionist	Norman Boyd	225
Independent	George Reynolds	169
Alliance	Julie Greaves	119
Turnout		5,182
Andrew Beattie leaves UUP		
Newtownabbey Labour Party gain from Alliance		
NRA gain from DUP		

University
Party	Candidate	1st Pref
Ind. Unionist	Fraser Agnew	878
UUP	Ken Robinson	706
Ind. Unionist	George Herron	633
UUP	Bill Johnston	499
UUP	Barbara Gilliland	490
Alliance	Lynn Frazer	461
PUP	William Greer	448
UK Unionist	William Boyd	426
Ulster Democratic	Harry Speers	371
Alliance	William McKimmon	369
DUP	Tony Lough	333
DUP	Alan Hewitt	299
Newtownabbey Ratepayers' Association	Samuel Neill	226
Newtownabbey Labour Party	William McClinton	212
PUP	Alexander Knell	131
Ind. Unionist	Jack McDonald	86
UUP	Louie Robinson	78
Turnout		6,646
George Herron leaves UUP		
PUP gain from DUP		

=== North Down ===
Election results, shaded by plurality of First Preference Votes

Abbey
Party	Candidate	1st Pref
Alliance	Stephen Farry	650
UK Unionist	Valerie Kinghan	650
NI Conservatives	Ann Thompson	597
UUP	Roberta Dunlop	482
DUP	Ruby Cooling	471
PUP	Stewart Currie	344
UUP	Karl McLean	328
Ind. Unionist	Cecil Braniff	165
Ulster Democratic	Norman McCullough	131
Independent	Raymond Gordon	115
Turnout		3,933
Valerie Kinghan leaves UPUP		
PUP gain from Independent Unionist		

Ballyholme and Groomsport
Party	Candidate	1st Pref
Ind. Unionist	Alan Chambers	1,218
Alliance	Marsden Fitzsimons	770
UUP	Leslie Cree	755
Independent	Austen Lennon	739
NI Conservatives	Bruce Mulligan	498
UK Unionist	Elizabeth Roche	440
Alliance	Gavin Walker	406
DUP	Marie Cree	375
UUP	Ian Henry	178
UUP	James Kingan	156
UUP	Ronald Dorian	106
Turnout		5,641
UKUP gain from DUP		

Bangor West
Party	Candidate	1st Pref
Independent	Brian Wilson	1,090
UUP	Roy Bradford	699
Alliance	Eileen Bell	662
UK Unionist	William Keery	509
UUP	Marion Smith	459
PUP	Ernest Steele	439
Alliance	Anne Wilson	387
DUP	John Gordon	308
Ind. Unionist	Ian Sinclair	227
DUP	Alan Graham	191
UUP	Roy Davies	190
NI Conservatives	Julian Robertson	112
Alliance	Derek Bell	76
Independent	Bob Mooney	15
Turnout		5,364
Brian Wilson leaves Alliance		
PUP gain from DUP		
UKUP gain from NI Conservatives		
Alliance gain from Independent Unionist		

Holywood
Party	Candidate	1st Pref
UUP	Ellie McKay	863
Alliance	Susan O'Brien	767
Independent	Dennis Ogborn	545
Alliance	Richard Good	434
DUP	Gordon Dunne	417
Independent	Jimmy White	279
Independent	Bobby Irvine	240
NI Conservatives	Jennifer Cumming	165
UK Unionist	Jeffrey Dudgeon	159
Turnout		3,869
DUP gain from NI Conservatives		
Alliance gain from Independent		

=== Omagh ===
Election results, shaded by plurality of First Preference Votes

Mid Tyrone
Party	Candidate	1st Pref
Sinn Féin	Patrick McMahon	1,375
Sinn Féin	Sean Clarke	1,129
UUP	Desmond Anderson	1,026
Sinn Féin	Michael McAnespie	980
SDLP	Joe Byrne	807
SDLP	Seamus Shields	741
Ind. Nationalist	Brian McGrath	554
DUP	Drew Baxter	543
Sinn Féin	Barney McAleer	382
DUP	Jim Patterson	284
UUP	John Anderson	174
Democratic Left	Patrick McClean	148
Alliance	Paul Gallagher	57
Turnout		8,200
SDLP gain from Independent Nationalist		

Omagh Town
Party	Candidate	1st Pref
Sinn Féin	Francis Mackey	1,096
SDLP	Paddy McGowan	1,080
DUP	Oliver Gibson	747
Independent	Johnny McLaughlin	570
UUP	Reuben McKelvey	567
UUP	Ronald Oldcroft	486
Alliance	Ann Gormley	471
DUP	Harry Cairns	375
SDLP	Vincent Campbell	362
SDLP	Stephen McKenna	309
Sinn Féin	Patrick O'Hagan	204
DUP	Keith Mosgrove	196
Ulster Independence	Sandra Jones	42
Turnout		6,505
No change

West Tyrone
Party	Candidate	1st Pref
UUP	Crawford McFarland	1,243
Sinn Féin	Kevin McGrade	1,105
DUP	Thomas Buchanan	820
SDLP	Liam McQuaid	803
Sinn Féin	Cathal Quinn	753
UUP	Alan Rainey	727
SDLP	Pat McDonnell	655
SDLP	James Connolly	426
Workers' Party	Tommy Owens	387
DUP	Walter McFarland	294
Alliance	George Kerr	216
Labour	Amanda McLaughlin	141
Workers' Party	Tony Winters	70
Turnout		7,640
No change

=== Strabane ===
Election results, shaded by plurality of First Preference Votes

Derg
Party	Candidate	1st Pref
Sinn Féin	Charles McHugh	1,440
UUP	Derek Hussey	1,247
UUP	Edward Turner	838
DUP	Thomas Kerrigan	596
SDLP	Thomas Murtagh	550
Sinn Féin	Sean Elliott	545
SDLP	Bernadette McNamee	513
DUP	Sarah Anderson	447
Turnout		6,176
Derek Hussey joins UUP		

Glenelly
Party	Candidate	1st Pref
SDLP	Thomas McBride	1,155
Sinn Féin	Martin Conway	1,144
DUP	Allan Bresland	1,101
UUP	James Emery	1,021
DUP	John Donnell	677
UUP	Wilfred Sinclair	616
Independent	John Gallagher	114
Alliance	Elizabeth McCaffrey	87
Turnout		5,915
Sinn Féin gain from UUP		

Mourne
Party	Candidate	1st Pref
Sinn Féin	Ivan Barr	1,959
Sinn Féin	Jarlath McNulty	1,276
SDLP	Eugene Mullen	1,124
UUP	John Cummings	825
Independent	James O'Kane	801
SDLP	Eugene McMenamin	756
SDLP	Ann Bell	308
Alliance	Marie Wallace	95
Turnout		7,144
Sinn Féin gain from UUP		
