= 1997 Newtownabbey Borough Council election =

Local government election in Northern Ireland

← 1993	21 May 1997	2001 →

All 25 seats to Newtownabbey Borough Council 13 seats needed for a majority
	First party	Second party	Third party
Party	UUP	Alliance	Ind. Unionist
Seats won	10	3	3
Seat change	0	▼1	▼1
	Fourth party	Fifth party	Sixth party
Party	DUP	Newtownabbey Ratepayers	Newtownabbey Labour
Seats won	2	2	2
Seat change	▼3	▲2	▲1
	Seventh party	Eighth party	Ninth party
Party	SDLP	Ulster Democratic	PUP
Seats won	1	1	1
Seat change	0	▲1	▲1
- Results by district electoral area, shaded by First Preference Votes.

Elections to Newtownabbey Borough Council were held on 21 May 1997 on the same day as the other Northern Irish local government elections. The election used four district electoral areas to elect a total of 25 councillors.

== Election results ==
Newtownabbey Borough Council Election Result 1997
Party	Seats	Gains	Losses	Net gain/loss	Seats %	Votes %	Votes	+/−
UUP	10	1	1	0	40.0	31.4	7,237	▼1.1
Ind. Unionist	3	1	2	▼1	12.0	13.0	2,991	▼4.0
Alliance	3	1	2	▼1	12.0	10.3	2,364	▼5.8
DUP	2	0	3	▼3	8.0	10.7	2,454	▼10.6
Newtownabbey Labour Party	2	1	0	▲1	8.0	7.4	1,708	▲0.1
Newtownabbey Ratepayers Association	2	0	0	▲2	8.0	6.2	1,424	New
SDLP	1	0	0	0	1.0	6.5	1,500	▲1.0
Ulster Democratic	1	1	0	▲1	4.0	5.8	1,332	New
PUP	1	1	0	▲1	0.0	5.1	1,176	▲5.1
UK Unionist	0	0	0	0	0.0	3.0	681	New
Independent	0	0	0	0	0.0	0.7	169	▲0.7

Note: "Votes" are the first preference votes.

== Districts summary ==
Results of the Newtownabbey Borough Council election, 1997 by district
Ward	%	Cllrs	%	Cllrs	%	Cllrs	%	Cllrs	%	Cllrs	%	Cllrs	%	Cllrs	Total Cllrs
Ward	UUP		Alliance		DUP		SDLP		UDP		PUP		Others		Total Cllrs
Antrim Line	38.1	3	12.1	1	9.4	1	21.8	1	5.6	0	0.0	0	13.0	1	7
Ballyclare	42.6	3	14.9	1	17.8	1	0.0	0	3.5	0	5.7	0	15.5	0	5
Macedon	15.8	1	2.3	0	9.1	0	0.0	0	8.5	1	7.2	0	57.1	4	6
University	26.7	3	12.5	1	9.5	0	0.0	0	5.6	0	8.7	1	37.0	2	7
Total	31.4	10	10.3	3	10.7	2	6.5	1	5.8	1	5.1	1	30.2	7	25

== Districts results ==
=== Antrim Line ===
1993: 2 x UUP, 2 x Alliance, 1 x DUP, 1 x SDLP, 1 x Independent Unionist
1997: 3 x UUP, 1 x SDLP, 1 x Alliance, 1 x DUP, 1 x Newtownabbey Ratepayers
1993-1997 Change: UUP and Newtownabbey Ratepayers gain from Alliance and Independent Unionist

Antrim Line - 7 seats
Party	Candidate	FPv%	Count							
Party	Candidate	FPv%	1	2	3	4	5	6	7	8
SDLP	Tommy McTeague*	21.82%	1,500							
UUP	Edward Crilly*	19.33%	1,329							
Alliance	James Rooney*	7.17%	493	888.74						
UUP	Ivan Hunter	7.74%	532	533.41	856.11	1,009.11				
UUP	Arthur Kell*	10.94%	752	755.76	831.01	865.01				
DUP	Elizabeth Snoddy	9.41%	647	648.41	662.06	745.51	823.51	823.51	1,033.51	
Newtownabbey Ratepayers	John Blair*	6.72%	462	546.6	556.05	608.15	617.15	619.37	701.37	763.37
Alliance	Tommy Frazer	4.89%	336	473.71	481.76	503.75	504.75	525.54	584.13	605.13
Ind. Unionist	Arthur Templeton*	6.43%	442	445.76	458.01	486.86	505.86	506.1		
Ulster Democratic	Billy Blair*	5.56%	382	382.94	403.24					
Electorate: 16,864 Valid: 6,875 (40.77%) Spoilt: 120 Quota: 860 Turnout: 6,995 (41.48%)

=== Ballyclare ===
1993: 3 x UUP, 1 x DUP, 1 x Independent Unionist
1997: 3 x UUP, 1 x DUP, 1 x Alliance
1993-1997 Change: Alliance gain from Independent Unionist

Ballyclare - 5 seats
Party	Candidate	FPv%	Count						
Party	Candidate	FPv%	1	2	3	4	5	6	7
UUP	James Bingham*	19.68%	847						
DUP	Paul Girvan	16.38%	705	719.1					
Alliance	Pat McCudden	13.62%	586	588.85	596.85	598.85	613.3	701.3	755.3
UUP	Vera McWilliam	11.09%	477	532.8	549.95	565.7	610.05	670.05	729.05
UUP	Edward Turkington	8.41%	362	384.65	401.4	424.45	479.9	518.65	641.3
UUP	Peter Walker	8.09%	348	358.65	367.25	378.85	396.45	425.45	482
Ind. Unionist	Samuel Cameron*	6.09%	262	268.75	286.9	316.15	354.3	399.6	
Newtownabbey Ratepayers	Etta Mann	6.02%	259	259.9	269.9	275.05	296.35		
PUP	Norman Lavery	5.23%	225	228.15	230.15	263.2			
Ulster Democratic	Dave Burgess	3.18%	137	142.85	145				
Ind. Unionist	Leslie Porter	2.21%	95	96.95					
Electorate: 11,796 Valid: 4,303 (36.48%) Spoilt: 79 Quota: 718 Turnout: 4,382 (37.15%)

=== Macedon ===
1993: 2 x UUP, 1 x DUP, 1 x Alliance, 1 x Newtownabbey Labour, 1 x Independent Unionist
1997: 2 x Newtownabbey Labour, 1 x UUP, 1 x UDP, 1 x Newtownabbey Ratepayers, 1 x Independent Unionist
1993-1997 Change: Newtownabbey Labour, Newtownabbey Ratepayers and UDP gain from UUP, DUP and Alliance

Macedon - 6 seats
Party	Candidate	FPv%	Count							
Party	Candidate	FPv%	1	2	3	4	5	6	7	8
Newtownabbey Labour	Mark Langhammer*	21.16%	1,103							
UUP	David Hollis	10.34%	539	563.15	568.85	593.55	658.3	792.3		
Ind. Unionist	Andrew Beattie*	11.42%	595	617.05	627.1	655.5	710.25	752.25		
Newtownabbey Labour	Robert Kidd	7.54%	393	534.05	563.95	581.65	603.75	630.75	718.55	731.75
Ulster Democratic	Tommy Kirkham	8.48%	442	460.2	462.2	468.2	486.55	508.6	682.3	695.5
Newtownabbey Ratepayers	Billy Webb	9.15%	477	534.4	585.95	624.1	646.45	664.25	690.05	694.45
DUP	Billy Snoddy*	9.02%	470	485.05	487.05	506.05	545.45	580.5	644.6	660.55
PUP	Bob Gourley	7.14%	372	396.15	398.85	406.55	426.9	452.05		
UUP	Ricky Walker	5.33%	278	296.9	299.25	313.3	339			
UK Unionist	Norman Boyd	4.89%	255	265.5	266.85	283.85				
Independent	George Reynolds	3.24%	169	177.75	189.8					
Alliance	Julie Greaves	2.28%	119	136.5						
Electorate: 12,642 Valid: 5,212 (41.23%) Spoilt: 139 Quota: 745 Turnout: 5,351 (42.33%)

=== University ===
1993: 3 x UUP, 2 x DUP, 1 x Alliance, 1 x Independent Unionist
1997: 3 x UUP, 2 x Independent Unionist, 1 x Alliance, 1 x PUP
1993-1997 Change: PUP and Independent Unionist gain from DUP (two seats)

University - 7 seats
Party	Candidate	FPv%	Count											
Party	Candidate	FPv%	1	2	3	4	5	6	7	8	9	10	11	12
Ind. Unionist	Fraser Agnew*	13.21%	878											
UUP	Ken Robinson	10.62%	706	708.2	748.35	760.45	764.5	770.5	800.75	801.8	832.8			
Alliance	Lynn Frazer*	6.94%	461	462.3	464.3	471.35	472.35	529.35	565.4	568.4	573.4	874.4		
Ind. Unionist	George Herron*	9.52%	633	648.55	653.55	682.7	688.7	693.7	716.8	740	822.25	837.25		
UUP	Barbara Gilliland*	7.37%	490	496.65	507.7	512.85	516.85	519.85	537.9	550.05	572.05	606.15	751.6	772.48
UUP	Bill Johnston	7.51%	499	501.1	507.1	513.5	517.5	520.5	531.75	545.9	567.95	584.05	715.55	729.95
PUP	William Greer	6.74%	448	449	452.05	452.2	537.3	548.3	560.3	571.45	654.55	671.6	708.4	713.8
DUP	Tony Lough*	5.01%	333	333.75	334.75	339.85	342.85	346.85	357.85	560.7	614.9	616.95	686.3	688.46
UK Unionist	Billy Boyd	6.41%	426	432.65	433.7	439.8	440.85	446.85	470.95	486.05	518.35	530.45		
Alliance	William McKimmon	5.55%	369	369.55	371.55	376.55	378.55	442.55	506.55	506.55	510.55			
Ulster Democratic	Harry Speers	5.58%	371	372	375	377	395	400	407	425.1				
DUP	Alan Hewitt*	4.50%	299	300.7	300.7	300.85	301.85	302.85	307.85					
Newtownabbey Ratepayers	Samuel Neill	3.40%	226	226.75	228.8	230.8	231.85	264.85						
Newtownabbey Labour	William McClinton	3.19%	212	212	213	214	216							
PUP	Alexander Knell	1.97%	131	131.2	131.2	134.3								
Ind. Unionist	Jack McDonald	1.29%	86	88.45	89.45									
UUP	Louie Robinson	1.17%	78	78.35										
Electorate: 16,179 Valid: 6,646 (41.08%) Spoilt: 99 Quota: 831 Turnout: 6,745 (41.69%)
