= 2001 Newtownabbey Borough Council election =

Local government election in Northern Ireland

← 1997	7 June 2001	2005 →

All 25 seats to Newtownabbey Borough Council 13 seats needed for a majority
	First party	Second party	Third party
Party	UUP	DUP	SDLP
Seats won	9	8	2
Seat change	▼1	▲6	▲1
	Fourth party	Fifth party	Sixth party
Party	Independent	Alliance	Sinn Féin
Seats won	2	1	1
Seat change	▲2	▼2	▲1
	Seventh party	Eighth party	Ninth party
Party	United Unionist	Newtownabbey Ratepayers	Others
Seats won	1	1	0
Seat change	▲1	▼1	▼7
- Party with the most votes by district.

Elections to Newtownabbey Borough Council were held on 7 June 2001 on the same day as the other Northern Irish local government elections. The election used four district electoral areas to elect a total of 25 councillors.

== Election results ==
Newtownabbey Borough Council Election Result 2001
Party	Seats	Gains	Losses	Net gain/loss	Seats %	Votes %	Votes	+/−
UUP	9	0	1	▼1	36.0	29.2	10,216	▼2.2
DUP	8	0	6	▲6	32.0	26.8	9,406	▲16.1
Independent	2	2	0	▲2	8.0	10.5	3,673	▲9.8
SDLP	2	1	0	▲1	8.0	5.7	2,015	▼0.8
Alliance	1	0	2	▼1	8.0	8.0	2,384	▼2.3
Sinn Féin	1	0	0	0	4.0	5.0	1,747	▲5.0
United Unionist Assembly Party	1	0	0	0	4.0	3.7	1,297	New
Newtownabbey Ratepayers Association	1	0	0	0	4.0	3.1	1,039	▼3.1
PUP	0	0	1	▼1	0.0	4.1	1,458	▼1.0
NI Unionist	0	0	0	0	0.0	2.6	922	New
NI Women's Coalition	0	0	0	0	0.0	0.8	299	New
NI Conservatives	0	0	0	0	0.0	0.5	169	New

Note: "Votes" are the first preference votes.

== Districts summary ==
Results of the Newtownabbey Borough Council election, 2001 by district
Ward	%	Cllrs	%	Cllrs	%	Cllrs	%	Cllrs	%	Cllrs	%	Cllrs	Total Cllrs
Ward	UUP		DUP		SDLP		Alliance		Sinn Féin		Others		Total Cllrs
Antrim Line	27.2	2	22.2	2	19.2	2	5.2	0	13.4	1	12.8	0	7
Ballyclare	42.8	3	38.3	2	0.0	0	10.1	0	0.0	0	8.8	0	5
Macedon	11.2	1	27.3	2	0.0	0	2.4	0	5.0	0	54.1	3	6
University	33.6	3	22.7	2	0.0	0	13.1	1	0.0	0	30.6	1	7
Total	29.2	9	26.8	8	5.7	2	8.0	1	5.0	1	25.3	4	25

== Districts results ==
=== Antrim Line ===
1997: 3 x UUP, 1 x SDLP, 1 x Alliance, 1 x DUP, 1 x Newtownabbey Ratepayers
2001: 2 x DUP, 2 x UUP, 2 x SDLP, 1 x Sinn Féin
1997-2001 Change: DUP, SDLP and Sinn Féin gain from UUP, Alliance and Newtownabbey Ratepayers

Antrim Line - 7 seats
Party	Candidate	FPv%	Count									
Party	Candidate	FPv%	1	2	3	4	5	6	7	8	9	10
UUP	Janet Crilly	16.28%	1,704									
DUP	Nigel Hamilton	12.90%	1,350									
UUP	Ivan Hunter*	5.80%	607	869.43	923.58	925.89	978.8	986.73	1,167.63	1,311.63		
DUP	Arthur Templeton	6.11%	640	649.66	661.66	667.45	672.91	1,031.59	1,167.9	1,225.43	1,225.43	1,428.43
SDLP	Tommy McTeague*	10.78%	1,128	1,131.45	1,132.45	1,132.54	1,165.54	1,165.54	1,168	1,206.46	1,266.69	1,293.94
Sinn Féin	Briege Meehan	7.20%	754	754.46	754.46	754.49	756.49	757.49	757.49	760.49	1,264.49	1,265.49
SDLP	Noreen McClelland	8.47%	887	889.3	889.3	889.33	967.56	968.56	973.56	1,007.82	1,081.82	1,097.07
Alliance	Pam Tilson	5.23%	547	555.05	564.05	564.14	619.09	621.09	630.32	739.73	740.73	914.42
UUP	Arthur Kell*	5.12%	536	593.27	612.96	613.38	631.87	636.62	689.23	735.15	736.15	
Sinn Féin	Roisin McGurk	6.14%	643	643	643	643	647	647	647	655.23		
Newtownabbey Ratepayers	John Blair*	3.72%	389	396.82	451.28	451.55	487.39	490.42	524.86			
NI Unionist	Norman Boyd	3.99%	418	426.97	453.89	454.79	464.2	471.52				
DUP	Elizabeth Snoddy*	3.22%	337	347.81	362.27	392.09	402.81					
NI Women's Coalition	Joan Cosgrove	2.86%	299	309.35	323.04	323.19						
Independent	James Beckett	2.18%	228	232.37								
Electorate: 16,969 Valid: 10,467 (61.68%) Spoilt: 261 Quota: 1,309 Turnout: 10,728 (63.22%)

=== Ballyclare ===
1997: 3 x UUP, 1 x DUP, 1 x Alliance
2001: 3 x UUP, 2 x DUP
1997-2001 Change: DUP gain from Alliance

Ballyclare - 5 seats
Party	Candidate	FPv%	Count						
Party	Candidate	FPv%	1	2	3	4	5	6	7
DUP	Paul Girvan*	34.22%	2,583						
DUP	Pamela Hunter	4.08%	308	1,449.4					
UUP	Vera McWilliam*	16.31%	1,231	1,265.32					
UUP	James Bingham*	15.79%	1,192	1,232.56	1,296.91				
UUP	Edward Turkington*	7.17%	541	560.76	604.57	673.67	701.03	783.91	1,108.91
Alliance	Pat McCudden*	10.08%	761	774.52	783.1	813.61	814.51	880.12	927.12
UUP	Peter Walker	3.54%	267	272.72	284.94	307.49	311.27	339.53	
PUP	Norman Lavery	3.30%	249	270.84	291.12	305.8	307.87	327.17	
Independent	Sharon Parkes	3.27%	247	254.8	272.22	285.6	287.22		
NI Conservatives	Alan Greer	2.24%	169	188.76	204.75				
Electorate: 12,666 Valid: 7,548 (59.59%) Spoilt: 186 Quota: 1,259 Turnout: 7,734 (61.06%)

=== Macedon ===
1997: 2 x Newtownabbey Labour, 1 x UUP, 1 x UDP, 1 x Newtownabbey Ratepayers, 1 x Independent Unionist
2001: 2 x DUP, 2 x Independent, 1 x UUP, 1 x Newtownabbey Ratepayers
1997-2001 Change: DUP (two seats) gain from Newtownabbey Labour and Independent Unionist, Newtownabbey Labour and UDP become Independent

Macedon - 6 seats
Party	Candidate	FPv%	Count								
Party	Candidate	FPv%	1	2	3	4	5	6	7	8	9
DUP	Billy DeCourcy	19.29%	1,355								
Independent	Mark Langhammer*	18.88%	1,326								
DUP	Andrew Hunter	8.02%	563	883.84	912.7	939.22	946.26	1,015.26			
UUP	Dineen Walker	11.16%	784	787.12	830.54	857.18	894.74	943.12	950.64	1,060.64	
Newtownabbey Ratepayers	Billy Webb*	9.25%	650	652.86	706.68	742.28	803.18	831.48	961.24	1,000.22	1,019.22
Independent	Tommy Kirkham*	8.70%	611	618.02	649.74	667.78	674.56	699.2	710.24	804.48	820.48
Independent	Robert Kidd*	5.38%	378	382.42	451.06	471.44	491.56	550.46	640.88	756.8	774.8
PUP	Dougie Jamison	5.67%	398	402.16	429.98	440.98	454.28	499.18	501.18		
Sinn Féin	Kevin Vernon	4.98%	350	350	365.34	368.9	376.16	377.68			
Independent	Andrew Beattie*	3.93%	276	280.16	294.98	299.54	317.58				
Alliance	Michael Campbell	2.46%	173	173.52	191.46	206.98					
Independent	Victor Robinson	2.28%	160	161.04	175.86						
Electorate: 12,115 Valid: 7,024 (57.98%) Spoilt: 255 Quota: 1,004 Turnout: 7,279 (60.08%)

=== University ===
1997: 3 x UUP, 2 x Independent Unionist, 1 x Alliance, 1 x PUP
2001: 3 x UUP, 2 x DUP, 1 x Alliance, 1 x United Unionist
1997-2001 Change: DUP (two seats) gain from PUP and Independent Unionist, Independent Unionist joins United Unionist

University - 7 seats
Party	Candidate	FPv%	Count							
Party	Candidate	FPv%	1	2	3	4	5	6	7	8
DUP	Roger Hutchinson	17.92%	1,791							
UUP	Ken Robinson*	15.36%	1,535							
UUP	Barbara Gilliland*	13.52%	1,351							
Alliance	Lynn Frazer*	13.14%	1,313							
United Unionist	Fraser Agnew*	8.28%	828	836.7	856.46	861.15	866.07	952.41	1,183.38	1,329.38
DUP	John Mann	4.79%	479	976.4	989.89	993.81	994.89	1,051.57	1,100.67	1,253.67
UUP	Vi Scott	4.68%	468	473.1	671.65	741.16	760.18	882.12	966.52	1,080.02
PUP	William Greer*	8.11%	811	817.6	827.48	830.42	833.72	873.9	922.98	974.03
NI Unionist	Billy Boyd	5.04%	504	509.7	517.49	519.73	521.71	540.75	578.13	
United Unionist	John Scott	4.69%	469	471.1	488.2	491.91	495.33	527.11		
Independent	Alister Bell	4.47%	447	449.1	460.12	462.57	483.75			
Electorate: 16,875 Valid: 9,996 (59.24%) Spoilt: 236 Quota: 1,250 Turnout: 10,232 (60.63%)
