= University (District Electoral Area) =

District electoral areas in Newtownabbey, Northern Ireland

University DEA (1993-2014) within Newtownabbey

University was one of the four district electoral areas in Newtownabbey, Northern Ireland which existed from 1993 to 2014. The district elected seven members to Newtownabbey Borough Council and formed part of the East Antrim constituencies for the Northern Ireland Assembly and UK Parliament and part of the South Antrim constituencies for the Northern Ireland Assembly and UK Parliament.

It was created for the 1993 local elections, and contained the wards of Ballyduff, Carnmoney, Hawthorne, Jordanstown, Monkstown, Mossley and Rosstulla. It was abolished for the 2014 local elections and replaced by the Three Mile Water DEA.

== Councillors ==
Election	Councillor (Party)	Councillor (Party)	Councillor (Party)	Councillor (Party)	Councillor (Party)	Councillor (Party)	Councillor (Party)
2011	Lynn Frazer (Alliance)	Tom Campbell (Alliance)	Ken Robinson (UUP)	Fraser Agnew (UUP)/ (UUC)/ (Independent Unionist)	Pamela Barr (DUP)	Robert Hill (DUP)	William Ball (DUP)
2005	Lynn Frazer (Alliance)	Barbara Gilliland (UUP)	Ken Robinson (UUP)	Fraser Agnew (UUP)/ (UUC)/ (Independent Unionist)	John Mann (DUP)	Robert Hill (DUP)	William Ball (DUP)
2001	Lynn Frazer (Alliance)	Barbara Gilliland (UUP)	Ken Robinson (UUP)	Fraser Agnew (UUP)/ (UUC)/ (Independent Unionist)	John Mann (DUP)	Roger Hutchinson (DUP)	Vi Scott (UUP)
1997	Lynn Frazer (Alliance)	Barbara Gilliland (UUP)	Ken Robinson (UUP)	Fraser Agnew (UUP)/ (UUC)/ (Independent Unionist)	George Herron (UUP)/ (Independent Unionist)	William Greer (PUP)	Bill Johnston (UUP)
1993	Gordon Mawhinney (Alliance)	Barbara Gilliland (UUP)	James Robinson (UUP)	Fraser Agnew (UUP)/ (UUC)/ (Independent Unionist)	George Herron (UUP)/ (Independent Unionist)	Tony Lough (DUP)	Alan Hewitt (DUP)

== 2011 Election ==
2005: 3 x DUP, 2 x UUP, 1 x Alliance, 1 x United Unionist

2011: 3 x DUP, 2 x UUP, 2 x Alliance

2005-2011 Change: Alliance gain from UUP, United Unionist joins UUP

University - 7 seats
Party	Candidate	FPv%	Count									
Party	Candidate	FPv%	1	2	3	4	5	6	7	8	9	10
DUP	William Ball*	16.54%	1,328									
DUP	Pamela Barr	12.64%	1,015									
UUP	Fraser Agnew*	12.02%	965	981.56	994.56	994.56	1,116.56					
Alliance	Tom Campbell*	11.26%	904	909.04	912.04	931.04	944.28	952.04	1,067.04			
DUP	Robert Hill*	8.04%	645	907.56	930.8	933.8	958.92	971.53	978.77	978.77	1,151.77	
UUP	Ken Robinson*	9.09%	730	734.08	745.08	746.08	868.04	937.88	950.12	950.69	1,107.69	
Alliance	Lynn Frazer*	6.79%	545	548.6	551.6	571.84	582.08	592.75	736.72	796	836.1	860.1
Independent	Stephen Ross	5.99%	481	485.08	497.08	501.08	521.8	528.59	576.59	578.3	627.79	662.79
PUP	Phil Hamilton	6.30%	506	516.8	536.04	536.04	549.76	553.64	562.64	563.21		
SDLP	Dominic Mulligan	3.26%	262	262.48	262.48	409.48	410.48	411.45				
UUP	Barbara Gilliland*	4.07%	327	335.64	339.64	339.64						
Sinn Féin	James McKeown	2.68%	215	215.48	218.48							
BNP	Stephen Parkes	1.30%	104	105.68								
Electorate: 16,063 Valid: 8,027 (49.97%) Spoilt: 163 Quota: 1,004 Turnout: 8,190 (50.99%)

== 2005 Election ==
2001: 3 x UUP, 2 x DUP, 1 x Alliance, 1 x United Unionist

2005: 3 x DUP, 2 x UUP, 1 x Alliance, 1 x United Unionist

2001-2005 Change: DUP gain from UUP

University - 7 seats
Party	Candidate	FPv%	Count					
Party	Candidate	FPv%	1	2	3	4	5	6
DUP	William Ball	23.45%	2,025					
UUP	Ken Robinson*	16.57%	1,431					
DUP	Robert Hill	7.31%	631	1,418.52				
Alliance	Lynn Frazer*	12.44%	1,074	1,076.76	1,091.01			
DUP	John Mann	10.02%	865	923.88	941.63	1,260.64		
UUP	Barbara Gilliland*	8.70%	751	777.68	904.43	906.33	1,155.33	
United Unionist	Fraser Agnew*	8.52%	736	769.12	792.62	794.52	906.34	1,023.19
Newtownabbey Ratepayers	John Blair	9.01%	778	789.5	806	806.19	854.4	886.7
UUP	Vi Scott*	3.97%	343	348.52	496.02	396.97		
Electorate: 15,829 Valid: 8,634 (54.55%) Spoilt: 211 Quota: 1,080 Turnout: 8,845 (55.88%)

== 2001 Election ==
1997: 3 x UUP, 2 x Independent Unionist, 1 x Alliance, 1 x PUP

2001: 3 x UUP, 2 x DUP, 1 x Alliance, 1 x United Unionist

1997-2001 Change: DUP (two seats) gain from PUP and Independent Unionist, Independent Unionist joins United Unionist

University - 7 seats
Party	Candidate	FPv%	Count							
Party	Candidate	FPv%	1	2	3	4	5	6	7	8
DUP	Roger Hutchinson	17.92%	1,791							
UUP	Ken Robinson*	15.36%	1,535							
UUP	Barbara Gilliland*	13.52%	1,351							
Alliance	Lynn Frazer*	13.14%	1,313							
United Unionist	Fraser Agnew*	8.28%	828	836.7	856.46	861.15	866.07	952.41	1,183.38	1,329.38
DUP	John Mann	4.79%	479	976.4	989.89	993.81	994.89	1,051.57	1,100.67	1,253.67
UUP	Vi Scott	4.68%	468	473.1	671.65	741.16	760.18	882.12	966.52	1,080.02
PUP	William Greer*	8.11%	811	817.6	827.48	830.42	833.72	873.9	922.98	974.03
NI Unionist	Billy Boyd	5.04%	504	509.7	517.49	519.73	521.71	540.75	578.13	
United Unionist	John Scott	4.69%	469	471.1	488.2	491.91	495.33	527.11		
Independent	Alister Bell	4.47%	447	449.1	460.12	462.57	483.75			
Electorate: 16,875 Valid: 9,996 (59.24%) Spoilt: 236 Quota: 1,250 Turnout: 10,232 (60.63%)

== 1997 Election ==
1993: 3 x UUP, 2 x DUP, 1 x Alliance, 1 x Independent Unionist

1997: 3 x UUP, 2 x Independent Unionist, 1 x Alliance, 1 x PUP

1993-1997 Change: PUP and Independent Unionist gain from DUP (two seats)

University - 7 seats
Party	Candidate	FPv%	Count											
Party	Candidate	FPv%	1	2	3	4	5	6	7	8	9	10	11	12
Ind. Unionist	Fraser Agnew*	13.21%	878											
UUP	Ken Robinson	10.62%	706	708.2	748.35	760.45	764.5	770.5	800.75	801.8	832.8			
Alliance	Lynn Frazer*	6.94%	461	462.3	464.3	471.35	472.35	529.35	565.4	568.4	573.4	874.4		
Ind. Unionist	George Herron*	9.52%	633	648.55	653.55	682.7	688.7	693.7	716.8	740	822.25	837.25		
UUP	Barbara Gilliland*	7.37%	490	496.65	507.7	512.85	516.85	519.85	537.9	550.05	572.05	606.15	751.6	772.48
UUP	Bill Johnston	7.51%	499	501.1	507.1	513.5	517.5	520.5	531.75	545.9	567.95	584.05	715.55	729.95
PUP	William Greer	6.74%	448	449	452.05	452.2	537.3	548.3	560.3	571.45	654.55	671.6	708.4	713.8
DUP	Tony Lough*	5.01%	333	333.75	334.75	339.85	342.85	346.85	357.85	560.7	614.9	616.95	686.3	688.46
UK Unionist	Billy Boyd	6.41%	426	432.65	433.7	439.8	440.85	446.85	470.95	486.05	518.35	530.45		
Alliance	William McKimmon	5.55%	369	369.55	371.55	376.55	378.55	442.55	506.55	506.55	510.55			
Ulster Democratic	Harry Speers	5.58%	371	372	375	377	395	400	407	425.1				
DUP	Alan Hewitt*	4.50%	299	300.7	300.7	300.85	301.85	302.85	307.85					
Newtownabbey Ratepayers	Samuel Neill	3.40%	226	226.75	228.8	230.8	231.85	264.85						
Newtownabbey Labour	William McClinton	3.19%	212	212	213	214	216							
PUP	Alexander Knell	1.97%	131	131.2	131.2	134.3								
Ind. Unionist	Jack McDonald	1.29%	86	88.45	89.45									
UUP	Louie Robinson	1.17%	78	78.35										
Electorate: 16,179 Valid: 6,646 (41.08%) Spoilt: 99 Quota: 831 Turnout: 6,745 (41.69%)

== 1993 Election ==
1993: 3 x UUP, 2 x DUP, 1 x Alliance, 1 x Independent Unionist

University - 7 seats
Party	Candidate	FPv%	Count							
Party	Candidate	FPv%	1	2	3	4	5	6	7	8
Ind. Unionist	Fraser Agnew*	18.24%	1,169							
UUP	George Herron*	13.43%	861							
UUP	James Robinson*	8.18%	524	588	604.31	608.95	702.66	728.76	1,003.76	
UUP	Barbara Gilliland*	5.63%	361	515.24	533.23	545.36	620.75	639.19	803.19	
DUP	Tony Lough	8.46%	542	556.72	557.98	558.62	567.01	712.89	737.29	769.29
DUP	Alan Hewitt	6.94%	445	464.84	468.06	471.06	492.8	658.49	687.07	755.07
Alliance	Gordon Mawhinney*	9.10%	583	592.28	593.26	649.58	661.18	675.13	716.09	736.09
Alliance	William McKimmon*	8.94%	573	582.6	584	651.32	658.45	665.44	688.99	711.99
UUP	Ken Robinson*	8.33%	534	566.64	572.31	578.63	591.08	614.7		
DUP	Samuel Neill*	5.96%	382	407.28	409.87	416.51	425.43			
UUP	Elizabeth McClenaghan	3.43%	220	246.88	255	262				
Newtownabbey Labour	Deborah Hayes	1.75%	112	114.56	114.77					
Newtownabbey Labour	Stafford Ward	0.92%	59	59.96	59.96					
Newtownabbey Labour	William McClinton	0.69%	44	45.92	45.99					
Electorate: 15,330 Valid: 6,409 (41.81%) Spoilt: 148 Quota: 802 Turnout: 6,557 (42.77%)
