= Macedon (District Electoral Area) =

District electoral area in Northern Ireland

- Antrim and Newtownabbey Borough Council DEA constituency

Current constituency
- Created: 1993
- Seats: 6 (1993-)
- Councillors: Matthew Brady (DUP); Robert Foster (UUP); Ben Mallon (DUP); Taylor McGrann (SF); Stafford Ward (IND); Billy Webb (APNI)

Macedon DEA within Antrim and Newtownabbey

Macedon DEA (1993-2014) within Newtownabbey

Macedon is one of the seven district electoral areas (DEA) in Antrim and Newtownabbey, Northern Ireland. The district elects six members to Antrim and Newtownabbey Borough Council and contains the wards of Abbey, Carnmoney Hill, O'Neill, Rathcoole, Valley and Whitehouse. Macedon forms part of the Belfast North constituencies for the Northern Ireland Assembly and UK Parliament and part of the East Antrim constituencies for the Northern Ireland Assembly and UK Parliament.

It was created for the 1993 local elections, where it contained six wards (Abbey, Cloughfern, Coole, Dunanney, Valley and Whitehouse).

== Councillors ==
| Election | Councillor (Party) | Councillor (Party) | Councillor (Party) | Councillor (Party) | Councillor (Party) | Councillor (Party) |
|---|---|---|---|---|---|---|
| 2023 | Billy Webb (Alliance)/ (NRA) | Robert Foster (UUP) | Taylor McGrann (Sinn Féin) | Stafford Ward (Independent) | Matthew Brady (DUP) | Ben Mallon (DUP) |
| December 2021 Co-Option | Billy Webb (Alliance)/ (NRA) | Robert Foster (UUP) | Taylor McGrann (Sinn Féin) | Victor Robinson (DUP) | Matthew Brady (DUP) | Ben Mallon (DUP) |
| October 2021 Co-Option | Billy Webb (Alliance)/ (NRA) | Robert Foster (UUP) | Taylor McGrann (Sinn Féin) | Victor Robinson (DUP) | Linda Irwin (DUP) | Ben Mallon (DUP) |
| May 2020 Co-Option | Billy Webb (Alliance)/ (NRA) | Robert Foster (UUP) | Taylor McGrann (Sinn Féin) | Victor Robinson (DUP) | Linda Irwin (DUP) | Paul Hamill (DUP) |
| October 2019 Co-Option | Billy Webb (Alliance)/ (NRA) | Robert Foster (UUP) | Taylor McGrann (Sinn Féin) | Victor Robinson (DUP) | Thomas Hogg (DUP) | Paul Hamill (DUP) |
| 2019 | Billy Webb (Alliance)/ (NRA) | Robert Foster (UUP) | Taylor McGrann (Sinn Féin) | Dean McCullough (DUP) | Thomas Hogg (DUP) | Paul Hamill (DUP) |
| February 2018 Co-Option | Billy Webb (Alliance)/ (NRA) | Robert Foster (UUP) | David Hollis (TUV) | Billy De Courcy (DUP) | Thomas Hogg (DUP) | Paul Hamill (DUP) |
| November 2017 Defection | Billy Webb (Alliance)/ (NRA) | John Scott (DUP)/ (Independent)/ (UUP) | David Hollis (TUV) | Billy De Courcy (DUP) | Thomas Hogg (DUP) | Paul Hamill (DUP) |
| August 2017 Defection | Billy Webb (Alliance)/ (NRA) | John Scott (DUP)/ (Independent)/ (UUP) | David Hollis (TUV) | Billy De Courcy (DUP) | Thomas Hogg (DUP) | Paul Hamill (DUP) |
| 2014 | Billy Webb (Alliance)/ (NRA) | John Scott (DUP)/ (Independent)/ (UUP) | David Hollis (TUV) | Billy De Courcy (DUP) | Thomas Hogg (DUP) | Paul Hamill (DUP) |
| 2011 | Billy Webb (Alliance)/ (NRA) | John Scott (DUP)/ (Independent)/ (UUP) | Victor Robinson (DUP) | Billy De Courcy (DUP) | Thomas Hogg (DUP) | Dineen Walker (DUP)/ (UUP) |
| 2005 | Billy Webb (Alliance)/ (NRA) | John Scott (DUP)/ (Independent)/ (UUP) | Victor Robinson (DUP) | Billy De Courcy (DUP) | Tommy Kirkham (UDP)/ (Independent) | Dineen Walker (DUP)/ (UUP) |
| 2001 | Billy Webb (Alliance)/ (NRA) | Mark Langhammer (Newtownabbey Labour)/ (Independent) | Andrew Hunter (DUP) | Billy De Courcy (DUP) | Tommy Kirkham (UDP)/ (Independent) | Dineen Walker (DUP)/ (UUP) |
| 1997 | Billy Webb (Alliance)/ (NRA) | Mark Langhammer (Newtownabbey Labour)/ (Independent) | Robert Kidd (Newtownabbey Labour) | Andrew Beattie (UUP)/ (Independent Unionist) | Tommy Kirkham (UDP)/ (Independent) | David Hollis (UUP) |
| 1993 | John Blair (Alliance) | Mark Langhammer (Newtownabbey Labour)/ (Independent) | Billy Snoddy (DUP) | Andrew Beattie (UUP)/ (Independent Unionist) | Billy Boyd (Independent Unionist) | David Hollis (UUP) |

== 2023 Election ==
2019: 3 x DUP, 1 x Alliance, 1 x UUP, 1 x Sinn Féin

2023: 2 x DUP, 1 x Sinn Féin, 1 x UUP, 1 x Alliance, 1 x Independent

2019–2023 Change: Independent gain from DUP

Macedon - 6 seats
| Party | Candidate | FPv% | Count | | | | | | | |
| Party | Candidate | FPv% | 1 | 2 | 3 | 4 | 5 | 6 | 7 | 8 |
|---|---|---|---|---|---|---|---|---|---|---|
| Sinn Féin | Taylor McGrann* | 18.63% | 1,326 | | | | | | | |
| DUP | Matthew Brady* | 17.14% | 1,220 | | | | | | | |
| UUP | Robert Foster* | 15.99% | 1,138 | | | | | | | |
| Alliance | Billy Webb* | 15.24% | 1,085 | | | | | | | |
| DUP | Ben Mallon* | 8.06% | 574 | 576.05 | 728.21 | 757.8 | 848.12 | 850.01 | 1,039.01 | |
| Independent | Stafford Ward | 6.84% | 487 | 518.16 | 523.92 | 552.85 | 611.8 | 623.7 | 683.8 | 836.19 |
| DUP | Victor Robinson* | 7.78% | 553 | 555.05 | 571.37 | 584.9 | 608.42 | 610.45 | 722.49 | 751.79 |
| Green (NI) | Ellie Byrne | 2.22% | 158 | 420.4 | 422.16 | 427.22 | 443.25 | 491.76 | 512.08 | |
| TUV | Norman Boyd | 4.68% | 333 | 334.64 | 345.2 | 363.79 | 433.8 | 435.76 | | |
| PUP | Rosemary Bell-McCracken | 3.43% | 244 | 250.56 | 258.24 | 281.89 | | | | |
Electorate: 14,554 Valid: 7,118 (48.91%) Spoilt: 85 Quota: 1,017 Turnout: 7,203 (49.49%)

== 2019 Election ==
2014: 3 x DUP, 1 x Alliance, 1 X UUP, 1 x TUV

2019: 3 x DUP, 1 x Alliance, 1 x UUP, 1 x Sinn Féin

2014-2019 Change: Sinn Féin gain from TUV

Macedon - 6 seats
| Party | Candidate | FPv% | Count | | | | | | |
| Party | Candidate | FPv% | 1 | 2 | 3 | 4 | 5 | 6 | 7 |
|---|---|---|---|---|---|---|---|---|---|
| Alliance | Billy Webb* | 18.01% | 1,127 | | | | | | |
| DUP | Paul Hamill* † | 16.67% | 1,043 | | | | | | |
| DUP | Thomas William Hogg* † | 15.96% | 999 | | | | | | |
| UUP | Robert Foster* | 15.28% | 956 | | | | | | |
| DUP | Dean McCullough †† | 5.13% | 321 | 332.4 | 439.08 | 509.88 | 558.24 | 687.42 | 976.42 |
| Sinn Féin | Taylor McGrann | 12.22% | 765 | 830.7 | 830.84 | 831.54 | 834.84 | 836.44 | 836.44 |
| Independent | Stafford Ward | 5.48% | 343 | 452.8 | 458.96 | 463.26 | 499.72 | 545.22 | 560.22 |
| DUP | Victor Robinson | 5.23% | 327 | 337.5 | 354.72 | 368.42 | 383.52 | 444.78 | |
| TUV | David Hollis* | 3.56% | 223 | 238 | 244.58 | 248.48 | 297.56 | | |
| UKIP | Robert Hill | 2.46% | 154 | 168.1 | 173.56 | 176.56 | | | |
Electorate: 13,593 Valid: 6,258 (46.04%) Spoilt: 73 Quota: 895 Turnout: 6,331 (46.58%)

== 2014 Election ==
2011: 4 x DUP, 1 x Alliance, 1 x UUP

2014: 3 x DUP, 1 x Alliance, 1 x TUV, 1 x UUP

2011-2014 Change: TUV gain from DUP

Macedon - 6 seats
| Party | Candidate | FPv% | Count | | | | | | |
| Party | Candidate | FPv% | 1 | 2 | 3 | 4 | 5 | 6 | 7 |
|---|---|---|---|---|---|---|---|---|---|
| Alliance | Billy Webb* | 13.99% | 830 | 946 | | | | | |
| DUP | Billy De Courcy* | 14.23% | 844 | 885 | | | | | |
| DUP | Thomas Hogg* | 9.80% | 581 | 609 | 610 | 613.88 | 648.88 | 918.88 | |
| DUP | Paul Hamill | 9.07% | 538 | 579 | 581 | 603.31 | 693.31 | 907.31 | |
| TUV | David Hollis | 10.88% | 645 | 661 | 664 | 665.94 | 821.94 | 852.94 | |
| UUP | John Scott* ‡‡† | 9.07% | 538 | 559 | 565 | 568.88 | 701.88 | 752.79 | 808.79 |
| Sinn Féin | Brónach Anglin | 9.41% | 558 | 599 | 642 | 642 | 643 | 647 | 648 |
| DUP | Victor Robinson | 7.79% | 462 | 550 | 555 | 559.85 | 632.85 | | |
| PUP | Ken Wilkinson | 8.48% | 503 | 517 | 519 | 519 | | | |
| DUP | Dineen Walker* | 4.32% | 256 | | | | | | |
| SDLP | Dominic Mullaghan | 3.00% | 178 | | | | | | |
Electorate: 13,198 Valid: 5,931 (44.94%) Spoilt: 108 Quota: 848 Turnout: 6,039 (45.69%)

== 2011 Election ==
2005: 3 x DUP, 1 x UUP, 1 x Newtownabbey Ratepayers, 1 x Independent

2011: 4 x DUP, 1 x UUP, 1 x Alliance

2005-2011 Change: DUP gain from Independent, Newtownabbey Ratepayers joins Alliance

Macedon - 6 seats
| Party | Candidate | FPv% | Count | | | | | | |
| Party | Candidate | FPv% | 1 | 2 | 3 | 4 | 5 | 6 | 7 |
|---|---|---|---|---|---|---|---|---|---|
| DUP | Billy DeCourcy* | 23.90% | 1,146 | | | | | | |
| Alliance | Billy Webb* | 15.77% | 756 | | | | | | |
| DUP | Thomas Hogg | 12.12% | 581 | 864.31 | | | | | |
| DUP | Victor Robinson* | 14.08% | 675 | 757.41 | | | | | |
| DUP | Dineen Walker* | 7.53% | 361 | 408.56 | 563.27 | 626.82 | 640.47 | 840.47 | |
| UUP | John Scott* | 8.66% | 415 | 432.22 | 443.29 | 447.8 | 476.27 | 571.67 | 639.67 |
| Sinn Féin | Mary Gillen | 9.68% | 464 | 468.92 | 469.46 | 469.87 | 485.47 | 493.93 | 496.93 |
| Independent | Tommy Kirkham* | 8.26% | 396 | 419.78 | 426.8 | 429.67 | 440.46 | | |
Electorate: 10,707 Valid: 4,794 (44.77%) Spoilt: 122 Quota: 685 Turnout: 4,916 (45.91%)

== 2005 Election ==
2001: 2 x DUP, 2 x Independent, 1 x UUP, 1 x Newtownabbey Ratepayers

2005: 3 x DUP, 1 x UUP, 1 x Newtownabbey Ratepayers, 1 x Independent

2001-2005 Change: DUP gain from Independent

Macedon - 6 seats
| Party | Candidate | FPv% | Count | | | | | | |
| Party | Candidate | FPv% | 1 | 2 | 3 | 4 | 5 | 6 | 7 |
|---|---|---|---|---|---|---|---|---|---|
| DUP | Billy DeCourcy* | 30.50% | 1,670 | | | | | | |
| Newtownabbey Ratepayers | Billy Webb* | 14.99% | 821 | | | | | | |
| DUP | Victor Robinson | 13.66% | 748 | 1,367.04 | | | | | |
| DUP | Dineen Walker* | 5.33% | 292 | 407.01 | 943.01 | | | | |
| Independent | Tommy Kirkham* | 10.63% | 582 | 645.6 | 656.1 | 703.35 | 729.43 | 735.53 | 846.53 |
| UUP | John Scott | 10.06% | 551 | 574.32 | 591.82 | 672.55 | 715.89 | 732.34 | 824.34 |
| Sinn Féin | Sean Oliver | 5.86% | 321 | 321 | 321.5 | 321.77 | 402.77 | 407.47 | 407.47 |
| PUP | Catherine Robinson | 5.31% | 291 | 338.7 | 348.2 | 376.55 | 384.61 | 389.41 | |
| SDLP | Michael McBrien | 3.65% | 200 | 202.12 | 203.12 | 205.01 | | | |
Electorate: 10,506 Valid: 5,476 (52.12%) Spoilt: 153 Quota: 783 Turnout: 5,629 (53.58%)

== 2001 Election ==
1997: 2 x Newtownabbey Labour, 1 x UUP, 1 x UDP, 1 x Newtownabbey Ratepayers, 1 x Independent Unionist

2001: 2 x DUP, 2 x Independent, 1 x UUP, 1 x Newtownabbey Ratepayers

1997-2001 Change: DUP (two seats) gain from Newtownabbey Labour and Independent Unionist, Newtownabbey Labour and UDP become Independent

Macedon - 6 seats
| Party | Candidate | FPv% | Count | | | | | | | | |
| Party | Candidate | FPv% | 1 | 2 | 3 | 4 | 5 | 6 | 7 | 8 | 9 |
|---|---|---|---|---|---|---|---|---|---|---|---|
| DUP | Billy DeCourcy | 19.29% | 1,355 | | | | | | | | |
| Independent | Mark Langhammer* | 18.88% | 1,326 | | | | | | | | |
| DUP | Andrew Hunter | 8.02% | 563 | 883.84 | 912.7 | 939.22 | 946.26 | 1,015.26 | | | |
| UUP | Dineen Walker | 11.16% | 784 | 787.12 | 830.54 | 857.18 | 894.74 | 943.12 | 950.64 | 1,060.64 | |
| Newtownabbey Ratepayers | Billy Webb* | 9.25% | 650 | 652.86 | 706.68 | 742.28 | 803.18 | 831.48 | 961.24 | 1,000.22 | 1,019.22 |
| Independent | Tommy Kirkham* | 8.70% | 611 | 618.02 | 649.74 | 667.78 | 674.56 | 699.2 | 710.24 | 804.48 | 820.48 |
| Independent | Robert Kidd* | 8.70% | 378 | 382.42 | 451.06 | 471.44 | 491.56 | 550.46 | 640.88 | 756.8 | 774.8 |
| PUP | Dougie Jamison | 5.67% | 398 | 402.16 | 429.98 | 440.98 | 454.28 | 499.18 | 501.18 | | |
| Sinn Féin | Kevin Vernon | 4.98% | 350 | 350 | 365.34 | 368.9 | 376.16 | 377.68 | | | |
| Independent | Andrew Beattie* | 3.93% | 276 | 280.16 | 294.98 | 299.54 | 317.58 | | | | |
| Alliance | Michael Campbell | 2.46% | 173 | 173.52 | 191.46 | 206.98 | | | | | |
| Independent | Victor Robinson | 2.28% | 160 | 161.04 | 175.86 | | | | | | |
Electorate: 12,115 Valid: 7,024 (57.98%) Spoilt: 255 Quota: 1,004 Turnout: 7,279 (60.08%)

== 1997 Election ==
1993: 2 x UUP, 1 x DUP, 1 x Alliance, 1 x Newtownabbey Labour, 1 x Independent Unionist

1997: 2 x Newtownabbey Labour, 1 x UUP, 1 x UDP, 1 x Newtownabbey Ratepayers, 1 x Independent Unionist

1993-1997 Change: Newtownabbey Labour, Newtownabbey Ratepayers and UDP gain from UUP, DUP and Alliance

Macedon - 6 seats
| Party | Candidate | FPv% | Count | | | | | | | |
| Party | Candidate | FPv% | 1 | 2 | 3 | 4 | 5 | 6 | 7 | 8 |
|---|---|---|---|---|---|---|---|---|---|---|
| Newtownabbey Labour | Mark Langhammer* | 21.16% | 1,103 | | | | | | | |
| UUP | David Hollis | 10.34% | 539 | 563.15 | 568.85 | 593.55 | 658.3 | 792.3 | | |
| Ind. Unionist | Andrew Beattie* | 11.42% | 595 | 617.05 | 627.1 | 655.5 | 710.25 | 752.25 | | |
| Newtownabbey Labour | Robert Kidd | 7.54% | 393 | 534.05 | 563.95 | 581.65 | 603.75 | 630.75 | 718.55 | 731.75 |
| Ulster Democratic | Tommy Kirkham | 8.48% | 442 | 460.2 | 462.2 | 468.2 | 486.55 | 508.6 | 682.3 | 695.5 |
| Newtownabbey Ratepayers | Billy Webb | 9.15% | 477 | 534.4 | 585.95 | 624.1 | 646.45 | 664.25 | 690.05 | 694.45 |
| DUP | Billy Snoddy* | 9.02% | 470 | 485.05 | 487.05 | 506.05 | 545.45 | 580.5 | 644.6 | 660.55 |
| PUP | Bob Gourley | 7.14% | 372 | 396.15 | 398.85 | 406.55 | 426.9 | 452.05 | | |
| UUP | Ricky Walker | 5.33% | 278 | 296.9 | 299.25 | 313.3 | 339 | | | |
| UK Unionist | Norman Boyd | 4.89% | 255 | 265.5 | 266.85 | 283.85 | | | | |
| Independent | George Reynolds | 3.24% | 169 | 177.75 | 189.8 | | | | | |
| Alliance | Julie Greaves | 2.28% | 119 | 136.5 | | | | | | |
Electorate: 12,642 Valid: 5,212 (41.23%) Spoilt: 139 Quota: 745 Turnout: 5,351 (42.33%)

== 1993 Election ==
1993: 2 x UUP, 1 x DUP, 1 x Alliance, 1 x Newtownabbey Labour, 1 x Independent Unionist

Macedon - 6 seats
| Party | Candidate | FPv% | Count | | | | | |
| Party | Candidate | FPv% | 1 | 2 | 3 | 4 | 5 | 6 |
|---|---|---|---|---|---|---|---|---|
| UUP | Andrew Beattie* | 16.27% | 907 | | | | | |
| Newtownabbey Labour | Mark Langhammer | 14.59% | 813 | | | | | |
| DUP | Billy Snoddy* | 11.64% | 649 | 653.92 | 656.92 | 672.4 | 1,000.4 | |
| UUP | David Hollis | 9.80% | 546 | 595.56 | 595.56 | 713.2 | 763.36 | 830.24 |
| Alliance | John Blair* | 13.80% | 769 | 775.84 | 779.96 | 788.44 | 795.56 | 801.72 |
| Ind. Unionist | Billy Boyd* | 9.11% | 508 | 535.36 | 536.48 | 610.44 | 676.52 | 785.64 |
| Newtownabbey Labour | Robert Kidd* | 10.89% | 607 | 609.64 | 656.88 | 663.12 | 686.6 | 706.84 |
| DUP | Billy DeCourcy | 8.72% | 486 | 491.28 | 492.28 | 501.64 | | |
| UUP | Samuel Martin | 2.60% | 145 | 153.04 | 153.04 | | | |
| Ind. Unionist | Norman Boyd | 1.58% | 88 | 89.44 | 89.44 | | | |
| Newtownabbey Labour | Thomas Davidson | 1.00% | 56 | 56.48 | | | | |
Electorate: 13,176 Valid: 5,574 (42.30%) Spoilt: 218 Quota: 797 Turnout: 5,792 (43.96%)
