= Norman Boyd =

Northern Irish politician (born 1961)

Member of the Northern Ireland Assembly for Antrim South
- In office 25 June 1998 – 26 November 2003
- Preceded by: New Creation
- Succeeded by: Paul Girvan

Personal details
- Born: 16 October 1961 (age 64) Carnmoney, Newtownabbey, Northern Ireland
- Party: Traditional Unionist Voice (2008 - present)
- Other political affiliations: NI Unionist Party (1999 - 2008); UK Unionist Party (1996 - 1998)

Norman Jonathan Boyd (born 16 October 1961) is a Northern Irish unionist politician who served as a Member of the Northern Ireland Assembly (MLA) for South Antrim from 1998 to 2003.

== Background ==
Boyd was born in Carnmoney, in North Belfast, and attended Belfast High School and Newtownabbey Technical College before working in banking.

== Political career ==
Boyd stood as an Independent Unionist at the 1993 local elections in the Macedon DEA, on Newtownabbey Borough Council, and later stood again in the same ward in the 1997 election for the UK Unionist Party (UKUP).

=== Member of the Northern Ireland Assembly ===
At the 1998 Northern Ireland Assembly election, Boyd was elected for the UKUP to represent South Antrim.

In January 1999, he joined three of the four other UKUP Assembly members in forming the Northern Ireland Unionist Party. He acted as whip for the new group, and was selected to stand for Westminster under his new party label at the 2000 South Antrim by-election, but withdrew during the campaign, calling on his supporters to back the Democratic Unionist Party candidate William McCrea. He did stand for the South Antrim seat at the 2001 general election, but came bottom of the poll, with only 972 votes. He also failed to be elected to Newtownabbey Borough Council.

At the 2003 Assembly election, Boyd was able to take only 774 votes, and lost his seat, along with all his party colleagues.

=== Post-Assembly ===
Boyd later joined the Traditional Unionist Voice (TUV), and stood for the party in the 2019 Northern Ireland local elections, where he unsuccessfully contested the Three Mile Water DEA on Antrim and Newtownabbey Borough Council.

At the 2022 Assembly election, Boyd was the TUV's candidate in East Antrim, coming sixth out of ten candidates.

He contested Macedon in the 2023 Antrim and Newtownabbey Borough Council election, but was unsuccessful.

Northern Ireland Assembly
New assembly	MLA for Antrim South; 1998–2003	Succeeded by Paul Girvan
