= Paul Girvan =

Northern Irish politician

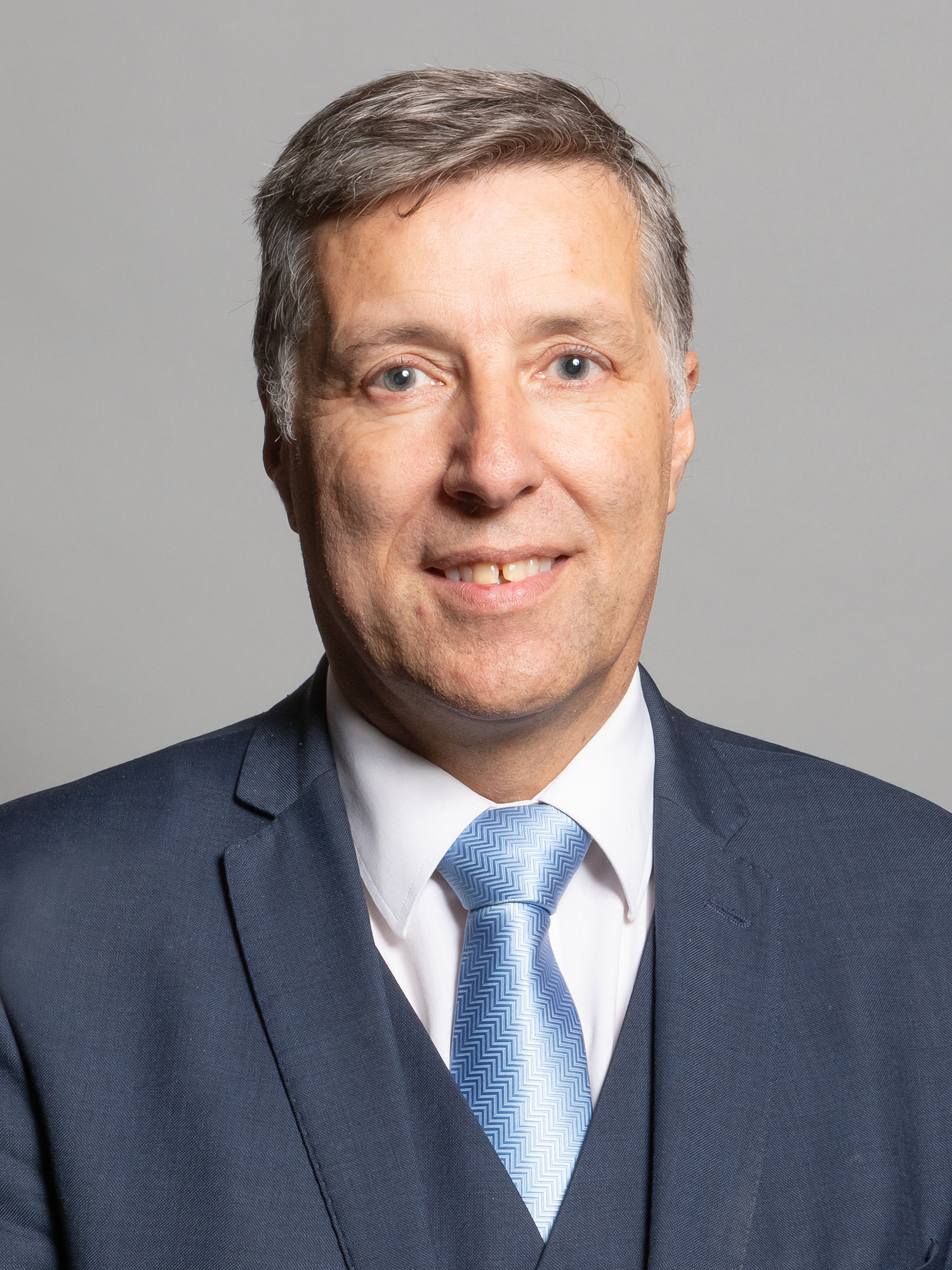
- Official portrait, 2020

Member of Parliament for South Antrim
- In office 8 June 2017 – 30 May 2024
- Preceded by: Danny Kinahan
- Succeeded by: Robin Swann

Member of the Northern Ireland Assembly for South Antrim
- In office 1 July 2010 – 8 June 2017
- Preceded by: William McCrea
- Succeeded by: Trevor Clarke
- In office 26 November 2003 – 7 March 2007
- Preceded by: Norman Boyd
- Succeeded by: William McCrea

Member of Newtownabbey Borough Council
- In office 21 May 1997 – 22 May 2014
- Preceded by: Samuel Cameron
- Succeeded by: Council abolished
- Constituency: Ballyclare

Personal details
- Born: William Paul Girvan; 6 July 1963 (age 62) Ballyclare, Northern Ireland
- Party: Democratic Unionist Party

William Paul Girvan (born 6 July 1963) is a retired Democratic Unionist Party (DUP) politician who was the Member of Parliament (MP) for South Antrim from 2017 to 2024. In this role, Girvan was the DUP's spokesperson for Transport. He was previously a Member of the Northern Ireland Assembly (MLA) for South Antrim from 2003 to 2007, and then from 2010 to 2017.

== Career ==
=== Newtownabbey Council ===
Girvan was first elected to Newtownabbey Borough Council in 1997, representing the Ballyclare District, and was re-elected in 2001, 2005 and 2011. From 2002 to 2004, he served as Mayor of Newtownabbey, and also served as chair of the council's Development Committee.

=== NI Assembly ===
In 2003, he was elected to the Northern Ireland Assembly, representing South Antrim. He was deselected by the DUP in South Antrim in 2007, but returned to the Assembly in 2010 when he was selected to replace William McCrea following his resignation.

=== Member of Parliament ===
In the 2017 general election, he contested South Antrim, winning the seat with a 3,208 majority, against the incumbent MP, Danny Kinahan of the Ulster Unionist Party (UUP).

In March 2019, Girvan was one of 21 MPs who voted against LGBT inclusive sex and relationship education in English schools.

He retained his seat at the 2019 general election, though did see his vote decline by 3%, with a majority of 2,689.

In July 2020, during a trade debate in the House of Commons, Girvan caused controversy when he said that food in shops must be affordable "for the housewife to buy." He immediately apologised for the remark.

At the 2024 general election, Girvan lost his seat to the UUP's Robin Swann, which saw his vote decline by 15.7%. He is now retired.

== Personal life ==
Girvan is married to Mandy, a former DUP councillor for Ballyclare.

== Sources ==
Civic offices
Preceded by Vera McWilliam	Mayor of Newtownabbey; 2002–2004	Succeeded by Ted Turkington
Northern Ireland Assembly
Preceded by multiple members	MLA for Antrim South; 2003–2007	Succeeded by multiple members
Preceded by William McCrea	MLA for Antrim South; 2010–2017	Succeeded by Trevor Clarke
Parliament of the United Kingdom
Preceded by Danny Kinahan	Member of Parliament for South Antrim; 2017–2024	Succeeded by Robin Swann
