= Mark Langhammer =

Northern Irish trade unionist

Member of Newtownabbey Borough Council
- In office 19 May 1993 – 5 May 2005
- Preceded by: District created
- Succeeded by: John Scott
- Constituency: Macedon

Personal details
- Party: Labour Party
- Other political affiliations: Independent; Newtownabbey Labour Party

Mark Langhammer is a Northern Irish trade unionist, employed as Director of the Association of Teachers and Lecturers and elected onto the Northern Ireland Committee of the Irish Congress of Trade Unions in 2008, being re-elected in 2010. A former politician in Northern Ireland, he was previously a prominent northern-based member of the Irish Labour Party.

== Political career ==
=== Early career ===
Initially a community activist in North Belfast's Rathcoole housing estate, Langhammer first became involved in politics in the 1980s, joining the Campaign for Labour Representation, which aimed to persuade the British Labour Party to organise in Northern Ireland. In 1989, he stood in the European Parliament election as a "Labour Representation" candidate, polling 3,540 votes.

=== Newtownabbey ===
Langhammer stood unsuccessfully for Newtownabbey Borough Council in Doagh Road in 1985 for the 'All Night Party'.

Langhammer was elected to Newtownabbey Borough Council as a Newtownabbey Labour candidate for Macedon electoral area in 1993. The Campaign for Labour Representation disbanded, having accepted that the British Labour Party had no intention of organising in Northern Ireland, and Langhammer instead began lobbying the Irish Labour Party to do so.

=== Labour coalition ===
Langhammer was initially recognised as the leader of the Labour coalition, formed in 1996 to contest elections to the Northern Ireland Forum. He headed the group's list in the Belfast North constituency, but this took only 571 votes, and he was not elected. He also took third position on the Coalition's regional list, but only the first two candidates were successful. Amid turmoil in the Coalition, Langhammer refused to take part in the talks which led to the Good Friday Agreement, holding that the set-up for them was "institutionalised sectarianism".

Langhammer held his council seat in 1997 and 2001 before standing down in 2005. In 2002, he was injured in a pipe bomb attack, which police attributed to loyalist paramilitaries.

=== Irish Labour Party ===
In 2003, the Irish Labour Party began admitting members in the north, and the following year, Langhammer became the Chair of the Northern Ireland Labour Forum, the local branch of the party. In 2005, he was unsuccessful in elections to the Irish Labour Party National Executive Committee (NEC), but was co-opted on the proposal of Kathleen Lynch.

Langhammer stood down from the NEC in 2008. Langhammer unsuccessfully proposed a motion for the party to contest council elections in Northern Ireland at the 2009 Irish Labour Party conference, which was defeated. Although remaining a Labour Party member, Langhammer is no longer active in the Party, or its Northern Ireland Constituency Party.

== Clash with UDA ==
In 2001 Langhammer campaigned to have a permanent Police Service of Northern Ireland presence established in the loyalist Rathcoole area, where the South East Antrim Brigade of the Ulster Defence Association (UDA) was particularly noted for racketeering and violence.

Following Langhammer's campaigning the police agreed to establish a clinic at a local community centre although this initiative raised the ire of the local UDA Brigadier John Gregg who saw it as a threat to his criminal empire. In September that same year a pipe bomb was left under Langhammer's car outside his Whiteabbey home although it exploded in the early hours with no one hurt.

== Other interests ==
From 1994 until 1998, Langhammer was the Chair of the Northern Ireland Association of Citizens Advice Bureaux. He was subsequently the Chair of Playboard NI.

He is a Director of Crusaders F.C.

== Personal life ==
Langhammer's grandfather was Franz Langhammer, a socialist councillor in the Sudetenland region of Czechoslovakia. Franz Langhammer was forced to flee the country when the Nazis invaded in 1938 and he opted to move to Northern Ireland as he felt his background as a printer would help him to obtain work in the then thriving textile industry.

Political offices
New political party	Leader of the Labour coalition 1996	Succeeded by Malachi Curran
