= John Blair (Northern Ireland politician) =

Deputy Speaker of the Northern Ireland Assembly since 2024

John Blair MLA
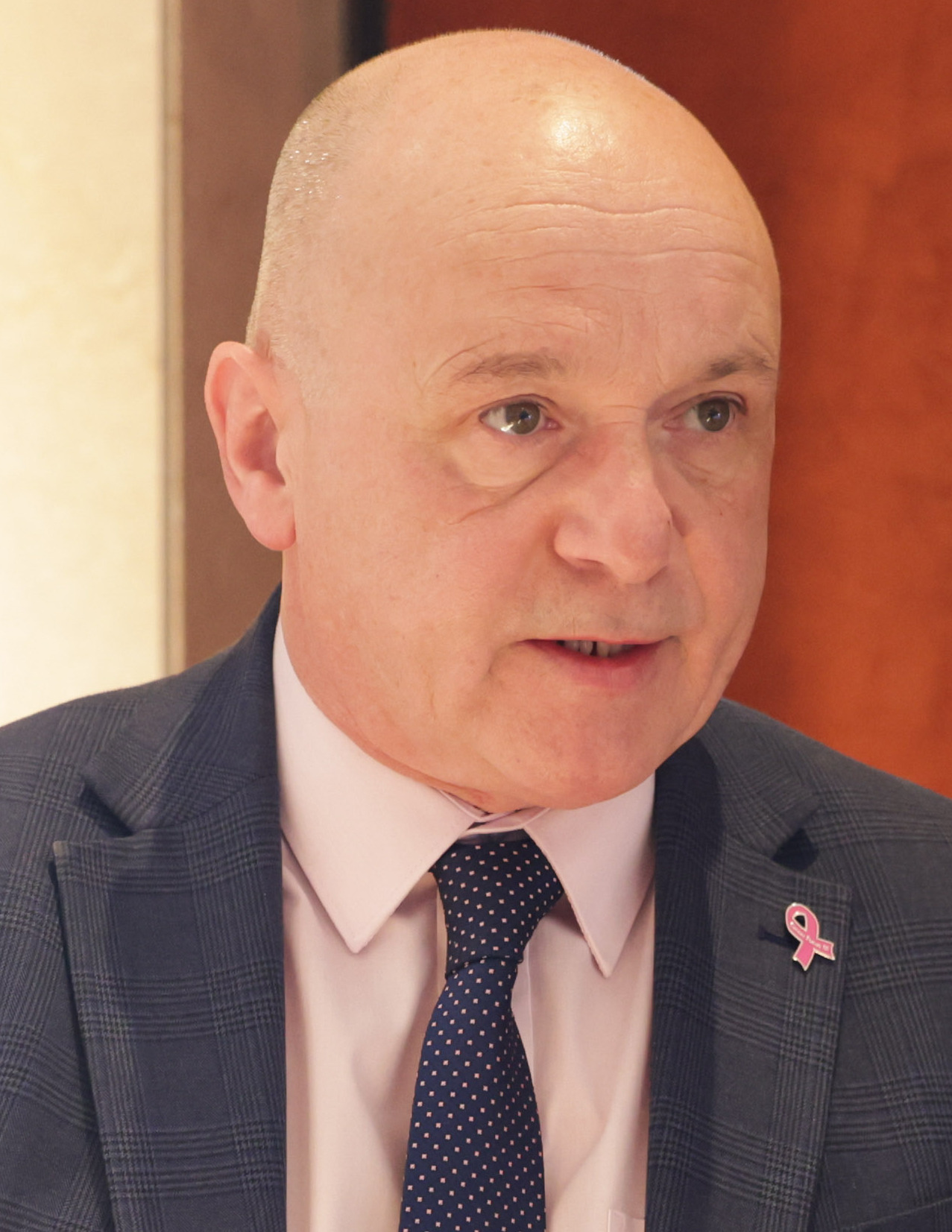
- Blair in 2024

Deputy Speaker of the Northern Ireland Assembly
- Incumbent
- Assumed office 3 February 2024 Serving with Carál Ní Chuilín and Steve Aiken
- Preceded by: Roy Beggs Jr (2022)

Member of the Northern Ireland Assembly for South Antrim
- Incumbent
- Assumed office 27 June 2018
- Preceded by: David Ford

Member of Antrim and Newtownabbey Borough Council
- In office 22 May 2014 – 27 June 2018
- Preceded by: Council created
- Succeeded by: Julian McGrath
- Constituency: Glengormley Urban

Member of Newtownabbey Borough Council
- In office 5 May 2011 – 22 May 2014
- Preceded by: Tom Campbell
- Succeeded by: Council abolished
- Constituency: Antrim Line
- In office 21 May 1997 – 7 June 2001
- Preceded by: Elizabeth Frazer
- Succeeded by: Briege Meehan
- Constituency: Antrim Line
- In office 19 May 1993 – 21 May 1997
- Preceded by: District created
- Succeeded by: Billy Webb
- Constituency: Macedon
- In office 17 May 1989 – 19 May 1993
- Preceded by: Jim Allister
- Succeeded by: District abolished
- Constituency: Doagh Road

Personal details
- Born: 10 February 1966 (age 60)
- Party: Alliance
- Other political affiliations: Newtownabbey Ratepayers' Association (1997–2005)
- Occupation: Politician
- Website: http://www.johnblairmla.com/

John Kenneth Blair (born 10 February 1966) is an Alliance Party politician serving as the Deputy Speaker of the Northern Ireland Assembly since 2024. Blair has been a Member of the Northern Ireland Assembly (MLA) for South Antrim since 2018. He is the first openly gay member of the Assembly.

== Political career ==
=== Early career (1997-2005) ===
John Blair was elected as a councillor to Newtownabbey Borough Council for the Newtonabbey Ratepayers' Association in the 1997 Local Elections, but lost his seat at the 2001 Local Elections after his vote decreased from 6.7% to 3.7%. He attempted to take a different seat the following 2005 elections, but was unsuccessful.

=== Councillor (2011-2018) ===
Blair was elected to Newtownabbey Borough Council in the 2011 local elections, representing Antrim Line DEA as an Alliance candidate. He topped the poll and was elected on the first count with 15.96% of the FPVs. He was re-elected to the new Antrim and Newtownabbey Borough Council in 2014, representing the Glengormley Urban DEA.

=== Member of the Legislative Assembly (2018-) ===
In 2018, he was co-opted to fill former Alliance Party Leader David Ford's Assembly seat in South Antrim, following David Ford's resignation. Blair has been appointed to the British–Irish Parliamentary Assembly and the Northern Ireland Policing Board.

He stood as the Alliance Party candidate for South Antrim in the 2019 General Election, increasing Alliance's share of the vote by 11.7% - from 7.4% to 19.4% - and taking third place.

Blair stood at the 2022 Assembly election, taking 7,315 FPVs (16%), and was re-elected on Stage 2.

He contested South Antrim at the 2024 general election, where he finished fourth with 4,574 votes, a 7.7% drop compared to 2019.

== Personal life ==
Blair is the first openly gay MLA to sit in the Northern Ireland Assembly. Blair has faced harassment due to his sexuality, including from a DUP councillor who sat on the same policing board alongside Blair.

== See also ==
- Alliance Party of Northern Ireland
- List of the first LGBT holders of political offices in the United Kingdom

Northern Ireland Assembly
| Preceded by David Ford | MLA for South Antrim; 2018–present | Incumbent |
