= Billy Snoddy =

Newtownabbey Borough Councillor
- In office 19 May 1993 – 21 May 1997
- Preceded by: District created
- Succeeded by: Robert Kidd
- Constituency: Macedon
- In office 17 May 1989 – 19 May 1993
- Preceded by: David Hollis
- Succeeded by: District abolished
- Constituency: Doagh Road

Member of the Northern Ireland Forum for North Belfast
- In office 30 May 1996 – 25 April 1998
- Preceded by: Forum established
- Succeeded by: Forum dissolved

Personal details
- Born: County Antrim, Northern Ireland
- Political party: Democratic Unionist

Billy Snoddy is a former Northern Irish unionist politician.

== Career ==
He was a member of Newtownabbey Borough Council from 1989 to 1997, and was elected to the Northern Ireland Forum in 1996

Civic offices
Preceded by Andrew Beattie	Mayor of Newtownabbey; 1996–1997	Succeeded by Ned Crilly
Northern Ireland Forum
New forum	Member for North Belfast; 1996–1998	Forum dissolved
