= Newtownabbey Ratepayers' Association =

Political party in Northern Ireland

The Newtownabbey Ratepayers' Association was a minor political party operating in Newtownabbey, Northern Ireland

It contested elections for Newtownabbey Borough Council from 1997 to 2005 and registered as a political party with the Electoral Commission in 2001.

The party had 2 councillors elected in the 1997 local elections, 1 in 2001 and 1 in 2005. In the 2005 elections the party stood candidates in 3 of Newtownabbey's 4 electoral areas and polled 1897 votes, 6.4% of the votes in the borough.

In their statement of accounts for the year to the end of 2005, the party declared that they had a membership of 23.

Their sole remaining elected councillor, Billy Webb, joined the Alliance Party of Northern Ireland in April 2008.
