= Newtownabbey Borough Council =

Local authority in Northern Ireland

Coordinates: 54°39′25″N 5°54′25″W

Newtownabbey Borough
- Area: 151 km^{2} (58 sq mi); Ranked 22nd of 26
- District HQ: Newtownabbey
- Catholic: 22.6%
- Protestant: 67.8%
- Country: Northern Ireland
- Sovereign state: United Kingdom
- Councillors: MLAs Belfast North, East Antrim & South Antrim DUP: 9 Sinn Féin: 4 SDLP: 1 UUP: 2 Alliance Party: 2; MPs Nigel Dodds (DUP) Paul Girvan (DUP) Sammy Wilson (DUP)
- Website: www.newtownabbey.gov.uk

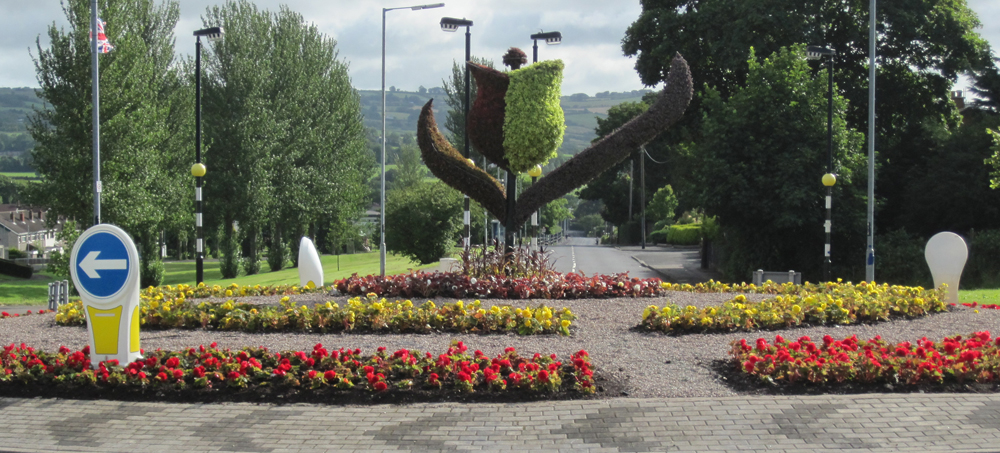
Floral sculpture on a roundabout in the borough showing a 3D representation of Newtownabbey Borough Council's logo

Newtownabbey Borough Council was a Local Authority in County Antrim in Northern Ireland, on the north shore of Belfast Lough just immediately north of Belfast. The Council merged with Antrim Borough Council in April 2015 under local government reform in Northern Ireland to form Antrim and Newtownabbey Borough Council.

== History ==
Newtownabbey was founded in 1958 as a result of the Newtownabbey Urban District Act (Northern Ireland) 1957 and comprises large urban residential areas along with traditional farming communities. Its major industries include electronics, software and telecommunications development and agriculture. Council headquarters were at Mossley Mill in Newtownabbey. Towns within the area included Ballyclare and Glengormley. The University of Ulster at Jordanstown is also in the area covered by the former Council.

The Newtownabbey Borough Council area consisted of four electoral areas: Antrim Line, Macedon, University, and Ballyclare. At the 2011 elections, 25 members were elected from the following political parties: 12 Democratic Unionist Party (DUP), 5 Ulster Unionist Party (UUP), 5 Alliance Party, 1 Social Democratic and Labour Party (SDLP) and 2 Sinn Féin. At the Annual General Meeting of the Council on the first Monday in June each year the Mayor was elected and became the first citizen of the Borough.

In elections for the Westminster Parliament it was split between the East Antrim constituency, the South Antrim constituency and the North Belfast constituency.

In May 2015 Newtownabbey Borough Council merged with Antrim Borough Council to form the new Antrim and Newtownabbey District Council.

== Elections ==
When first created for the 1973 local elections, the council consisted of four electoral areas, named A, B, C and D, which elected 21 councillors. For the 1985 local elections, the number of electoral areas was increased to five: Manse Road, Doagh Road, Shore Road, Antrim Line and Ballyclare, each of which elected five councillors. Boundary changes again took effect for the 1993 local elections. The Doagh Road area, centred on Rathcoole was reduced from five to four wards. Consequently, it gained the Whiteabbey and Cloughfern wards from the Shore Road district to form the new Macedon district. The Antrim Line district gained the Burnthill ward from the Manse Road district and the Mallusk ward from the Ballyclare district (which had gained a ward in the boundary changes.) The remaining seven wards of the Manse Road and Shore Road districts were combined to form the University district. In relation to the 1973–1981 districts, Ballyclare is similar to Area A, Macedon to Area B, University to Area C and Antrim Line to Area D.

== Summary of seats won 1973–2011 ==
Map of the borough's DEAs from 1993 to 2014

| | 1973 | 1977 | 1981 | 1985 | 1989 | 1993 | 1997 | 2001 | 2005 | 2011 |
|---|---|---|---|---|---|---|---|---|---|---|
| Ulster Unionist Party (UUP) | 9 | 8 | 9 | 10 | 11 | 10 | 10 | 9 | 6 | 5 |
| Alliance (APNI) | 3 | 6 | 3 | 2 | 4 | 4 | 3 | 1 | 2 | 5 |
| Democratic Unionist Party (DUP) | 3 | 4 | 5 | 9 | 6 | 5 | 2 | 8 | 12 | 12 |
| Independent Unionist (IU) | 3 | | 3 | 2 | 2 | 4 | 3 | | 1 | |
| Loyalist (Loy) | 2 | 1 | | | | | | | | |
| Labour^{†} | 1 | 1 | 1 | 1 | 1 | 1 | 2 | 1 | | |
| Unionist Party of Northern Ireland (UPNI) | | 1 | | | | | | | | |
| Independent (Ind) | | | 1 | 1 | | | | | | |
| Social Democratic and Labour Party (SDLP) | | | | | 1 | 1 | 1 | 2 | 1 | 1 |
| Newtownabbey Ratepayers' Association (NRA) | | | | | | | 2 | 1 | 1 | |
| Ulster Democratic Party (UDP) | | | | | | | 1 | 1 | | |
| Progressive Unionist Party (PUP) | | | | | | | 1 | | | |
| Sinn Féin (SF) | | | | | | | | 1 | 1 | 2 |
| United Unionist Coalition (UUC) | | | | | | | | 1 | 1 | |

^{†} Results for Labour are those for Robert Kidd and Mark Langhammer. Kidd was elected for the Northern Ireland Labour Party in 1973, as Independent Labour in 1977, for the Newtownabbey Labour Party in 1981, 1985 and 1997 and for Labour '87 in 1989. Langhammer was elected as Labour in 1993, 1997 and as an independent in 2001, though describing himself as "Labour" on the council website.

=== 2011 Election results ===
| Party | | seats | change +/- |
|---|---|---|---|
| • | Democratic Unionist Party | 12 | = |
| • | Ulster Unionist Party | 5 | -1 |
| • | Alliance Party of Northern Ireland | 5 | +3 |
| • | Sinn Féin | 2 | +1 |
| • | Social Democratic and Labour Party | 1 | = |
| • | Newtownabbey Ratepayers Association | 0 | -1 |
| • | United Unionist Coalition | 0 | -1 |
| • | Independent | 0 | -1 |

=== 2005 Election results ===
| Party | | seats | change +/- |
|---|---|---|---|
| • | Democratic Unionist Party | 12 | +4 |
| • | Ulster Unionist Party | 6 | -3 |
| • | Alliance Party of Northern Ireland | 2 | +1 |
| • | Sinn Féin | 1 | = |
| • | Social Democratic and Labour Party | 1 | -1 |
| • | Newtownabbey Ratepayers Association | 1 | = |
| • | United Unionist Coalition | 1 | = |
| • | Independent | 1 | -1 |

== Mayors ==
- 1977 – 78: Sidney Cameron, Ulster Unionist Party
- 1978 – 80: Arthur Templeton, Ulster Unionist Party
- 1980 – 81: J. Smith, Democratic Unionist Party
- 1981 – 82: C. W. Stringer, Ulster Unionist Party
- 1982 – 83: Clifford Forsythe, Ulster Unionist Party
- 1983 – 86: Leslie Caul, Ulster Unionist Party
- 1986 – 87: George Herron, Independent Unionist
- 1987 – 89: J. Smith, Democratic Unionist Party
- 1989 – 90: George Herron, Independent Unionist
- 1990 – 91: Fraser Agnew, Ulster Unionist Party
- 1991 – 92: Ken Robinson, Ulster Unionist Party
- 1992 – 93: Arthur Templeton, Independent Unionist
- 1993 – 94: Arthur Kell, Ulster Unionist Party
- 1994 – 95: J. Robinson, Ulster Unionist Party
- 1995 – 96: Andrew Beattie, Ulster Unionist Party
- 1996 – 97: Billy Snoddy, Democratic Unionist Party
- 1997 – 99: Edward Crilly, Ulster Unionist Party
- 1999 – 00: Jim Bingham, Ulster Unionist Party
- 2000 – 02: Vera McWilliam, Ulster Unionist Party
- 2002 – 04: Paul Girvan, Democratic Unionist Party
- 2004 – 05: Ted Turkington, Ulster Unionist Party
- 2005 – 06: Billy DeCourcy, Democratic Unionist Party
- 2006 – 07: Lynn Frazer, Alliance Party of Northern Ireland
- 2007 – 08: Nigel Hamilton, Democratic Unionist Party
- 2008 – 09: Victor Robinson, Democratic Unionist Party
- 2009 – 10: John Scott, Ulster Unionist Party
- 2010 – 11: Paula Bradley, Democratic Unionist Party
- 2011 – 12: Billy Webb, Alliance Party of Northern Ireland
- 2012 – 13: Victor Robinson, Democratic Unionist Party
- 2013 – 14: Fraser Agnew, Ulster Unionist Party
- 2014 – 15: Thomas Hogg, Democratic Unionist Party

== Review of Public Administration ==
Under the Review of Public Administration (RPA) the district was due to merge with Antrim Borough in 2011 to form a single council for the enlarged area totalling 572 km^{2} and a population of 128,361. The next election was due to take place in May 2009, but on 25 April 2008, Shaun Woodward, Secretary of State for Northern Ireland announced that the scheduled 2009 district council elections were to be postponed until the introduction of the eleven new councils in 2011. On 1 April 2015 the new Antrim and Newtownabbey Borough Council took over responsibility for the area.

== Population ==
The area covered by Newtownabbey Borough Council had a population of 85,139 residents according to the 2011 Northern Ireland census.

== See also ==
- Local government in Northern Ireland
- Reform of local government in Northern Ireland
