= 1989 Newtownabbey Borough Council election =

Local government election in Northern Ireland

← 1985	17 May 1989	1993 →

All 25 seats to Newtownabbey Borough Council 13 seats needed for a majority
	First party	Second party	Third party
Party	UUP	DUP	Alliance
Seats won	11	6	4
Seat change	▲1	▼3	▲2
	Fourth party	Fifth party	Sixth party
Party	Ind. Unionist	Labour '87	SDLP
Seats won	2	1	1
Seat change	0	▲1	▲1
	Seventh party	Eighth party
Party	Newtownabbey Labour	Independent
Seats won	0	0
Seat change	▼1	▼1

Elections to Newtownabbey Borough Council were held on 17 May 1989 on the same day as the other Northern Irish local government elections. The election used five district electoral areas to elect a total of 25 councillors.

== Election results ==
Newtownabbey Borough Council Election Result 1989
Party	Seats	Gains	Losses	Net gain/loss	Seats %	Votes %	Votes	+/−
UUP	11	1	0	▲1	44.0	45.8	9,953	▲8.2
DUP	6	0	3	▼3	24.0	19.5	4,242	▼11.3
Alliance	4	2	0	▲2	16.0	14.0	3,059	▲3.7
Ind. Unionist	2	0	1	0	8.0	9.3	2,013	▲1.2
Labour Party NI	1	1	0	▲1	4.0	4.6	987	New
SDLP	1	0	0	▲1	4.0	3.1	684	▼0.7
Workers' Party	0	0	0	0	0.0	1.8	395	▲0.5
Independent	0	0	1	▼1	0.0	1.3	281	▼1.4
Sinn Féin	0	0	0	0	0.0	0.5	96	New
National Front	0	0	0	0	0.0	0.2	41	New

Note: "Votes" are the first preference votes.

== Districts summary ==
Results of the Newtownabbey Borough Council election, 1989 by district
Ward	%	Cllrs	%	Cllrs	%	Cllrs	%	Cllrs	%	Cllrs	Total Cllrs
Ward	UUP		DUP		Alliance		SDLP		Others		Total Cllrs
Antrim Line	39.8	2	21.6	1	19.0	1	14.3	1	5.3	0	5
Ballyclare	37.5	2	17.5	1	7.2	0	0.0	0	37.8	2	5
Doagh Road	39.8	2	17.2	1	9.5	1	0.0	0	33.5	1	5
Manse Road	63.5	3	15.2	1	15.5	1	0.0	0	5.8	0	5
Shore Road	46.6	2	25.9	2	18.1	1	0.0	0	9.4	0	5
Total	45.8	11	19.5	6	14.0	4	3.1	1	17.6	3	25

== Districts results ==
=== Antrim Line ===
1985: 2 x UUP, 2 x DUP, 1 x Alliance
1989: 2 x UUP, 1 x DUP, 1 x Alliance, 1 x SDLP
1985-1989 Change: SDLP gain from DUP

Antrim Line - 5 seats
Party	Candidate	FPv%	Count			
Party	Candidate	FPv%	1	2	3	4
Alliance	James Rooney*	18.97%	908			
DUP	Tommy Kirkham	16.71%	800			
SDLP	Tommy McTeague	14.29%	684	731.71	771.39	868.39
UUP	James Smith	16.19%	775	788.65	796.95	806.95
UUP	William Green*	15.00%	718	725.02	734.06	745.74
UUP	Ivan Hunter*	8.65%	414	420.63	423.89	435.79
DUP	William McDonnell*	4.91%	235	237.86	242.12	250.03
Workers' Party	Brendan Harrison	2.97%	142	156.69	207.36	
Labour '87	Thomas Davidson	2.32%	111	127.77		
Electorate: 10,918 Valid: 4,787 (43.85%) Spoilt: 106 Quota: 798 Turnout: 4,893 (44.82%)

=== Ballyclare ===
1985: 2 x Independent Unionist, 1 x UUP, 1 x DUP, 1 x Independent
1989: 2 x Independent Unionist, 2 x UUP, 1 x DUP
1985-1989 Change: UUP gain from Independent

Ballyclare - 5 seats
Party	Candidate	FPv%	Count					
Party	Candidate	FPv%	1	2	3	4	5	6
UUP	Stephen Turkington	21.48%	969					
Ind. Unionist	Arthur Templeton*	19.13%	863					
UUP	Thomas Downes	15.98%	721	846.12				
Ind. Unionist	Sidney Cameron*	12.52%	565	594.67	656.62	697.15	791.15	
DUP	Samuel Cameron	9.55%	431	442.96	461.26	478.48	527.16	600.94
DUP	Samuel Gardiner*	7.96%	359	384.3	396.3	414.57	456.23	507.23
Alliance	Trevor Strain	7.16%	323	326.22	332.37	334.26	399.81	
Independent	Leonard Hardy*	6.23%	281	297.79	308.29	319.63		
Electorate: 11,546 Valid: 4,512 (39.08%) Spoilt: 106 Quota: 753 Turnout: 4,618 (40.00%)

=== Doagh Road ===
1985: 2 x UUP, 2 x DUP, 1 x Newtownabbey Labour
1989: 2 x UUP, 1 x DUP, 1 x Alliance, 1 x Labour '87
1985-1989 Change: Alliance gain from DUP, Newtownabbey Labour joins Labour '87

Doagh Road - 5 seats
Party	Candidate	FPv%	Count							
Party	Candidate	FPv%	1	2	3	4	5	6	7	8
UUP	Fraser Agnew*	21.70%	761							
Labour '87	Robert Kidd*	20.30%	712							
DUP	Billy Snoddy	17.22%	604							
UUP	Andrew Beattie*	15.00%	526	660.09						
Alliance	John Blair	9.52%	334	337.91	379.91	387.89	389.31	390.03	469.81	512.87
Ind. Unionist	David Hollis*	7.01%	246	254.97	271.56	279.4	294.03	300.79	308.03	392
UUP	Winifred Wright	3.11%	109	131.77	159.07	215.91	225.58	235.42	245.24	
Workers' Party	J. J. Magee	2.22%	78	78	104.88	105.16	109.72	109.84		
Sinn Féin	Liam Collins	2.74%	96	96	102.3	102.3	103.3	103.3		
National Front	David Kerr	1.17%	41	41.46	44.19	44.33				
Electorate: 8,976 Valid: 3,507 (39.07%) Spoilt: 118 Quota: 585 Turnout: 3,625 (40.39%)

=== Manse Road ===
1985: 3 x UUP, 2 x DUP
1989: 3 x UUP, 1 x DUP, 1 x Alliance
1985-1989 Change: Alliance gain from DUP

Manse Road - 5 seats
Party	Candidate	FPv%	Count		
Party	Candidate	FPv%	1	2	3
UUP	George Herron*	37.56%	1,762		
UUP	James Robinson*	19.48%	914		
UUP	Arthur Kell	6.46%	303	1,131.78	
DUP	Samuel Neill*	15.20%	713	800.78	
Alliance	Gordon Mawhinney	15.46%	725	768.89	904.25
Ind. Unionist	Thomas Buchanan	2.11%	99	109.83	305.35
Workers' Party	Brendan Heaney	3.73%	175	182.41	196.98
Electorate: 11,302 Valid: 4,691 (41.51%) Spoilt: 134 Quota: 782 Turnout: 4,825 (42.69%)

=== Shore Road ===
1985: 2 x UUP, 2 x DUP, 1 x Alliance
1989: 2 x UUP, 2 x DUP, 1 x Alliance
1985-1989 Change: No change

Shore Road - 5 seats
Party	Candidate	FPv%	Count			
Party	Candidate	FPv%	1	2	3	4
UUP	Barbara Gilliland	23.70%	1,008			
UUP	Ken Robinson*	22.87%	973			
DUP	Billy Boyd*	22.33%	950			
Alliance	William McKimmon	18.08%	769			
DUP	Jean Boyd	3.53%	150	351.31	544.86	767.16
Ind. Unionist	William Ball	5.64%	240	310.93	363.43	376.17
Labour '87	David Lowrie	3.86%	164	184.5	198.85	199.63
Electorate: 10,478 Valid: 4,254 (40.60%) Spoilt: 148 Quota: 710 Turnout: 4,402 (42.01%)
