= 1981 Northern Ireland local elections =

- 20 May 1981

All council seats
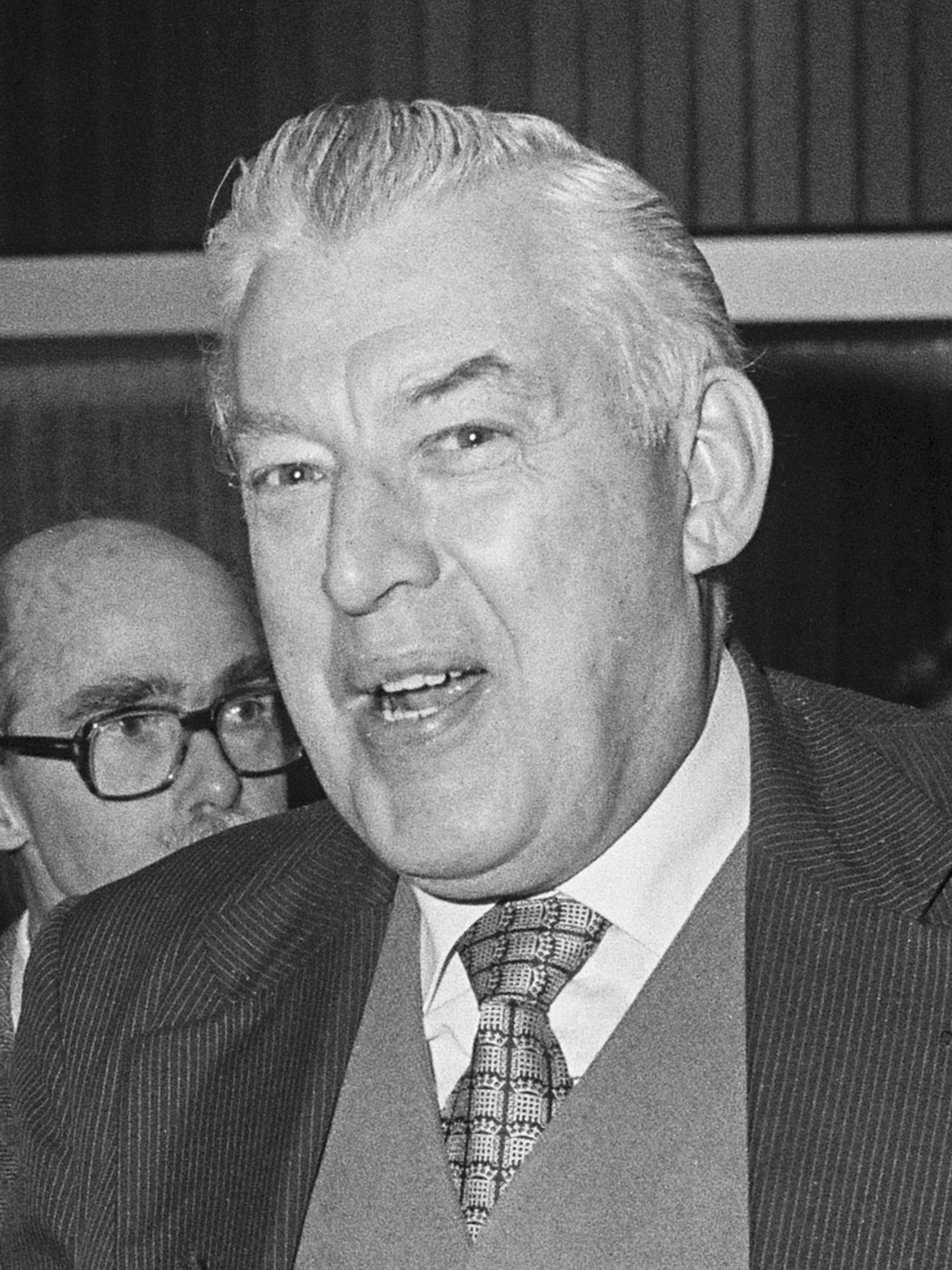

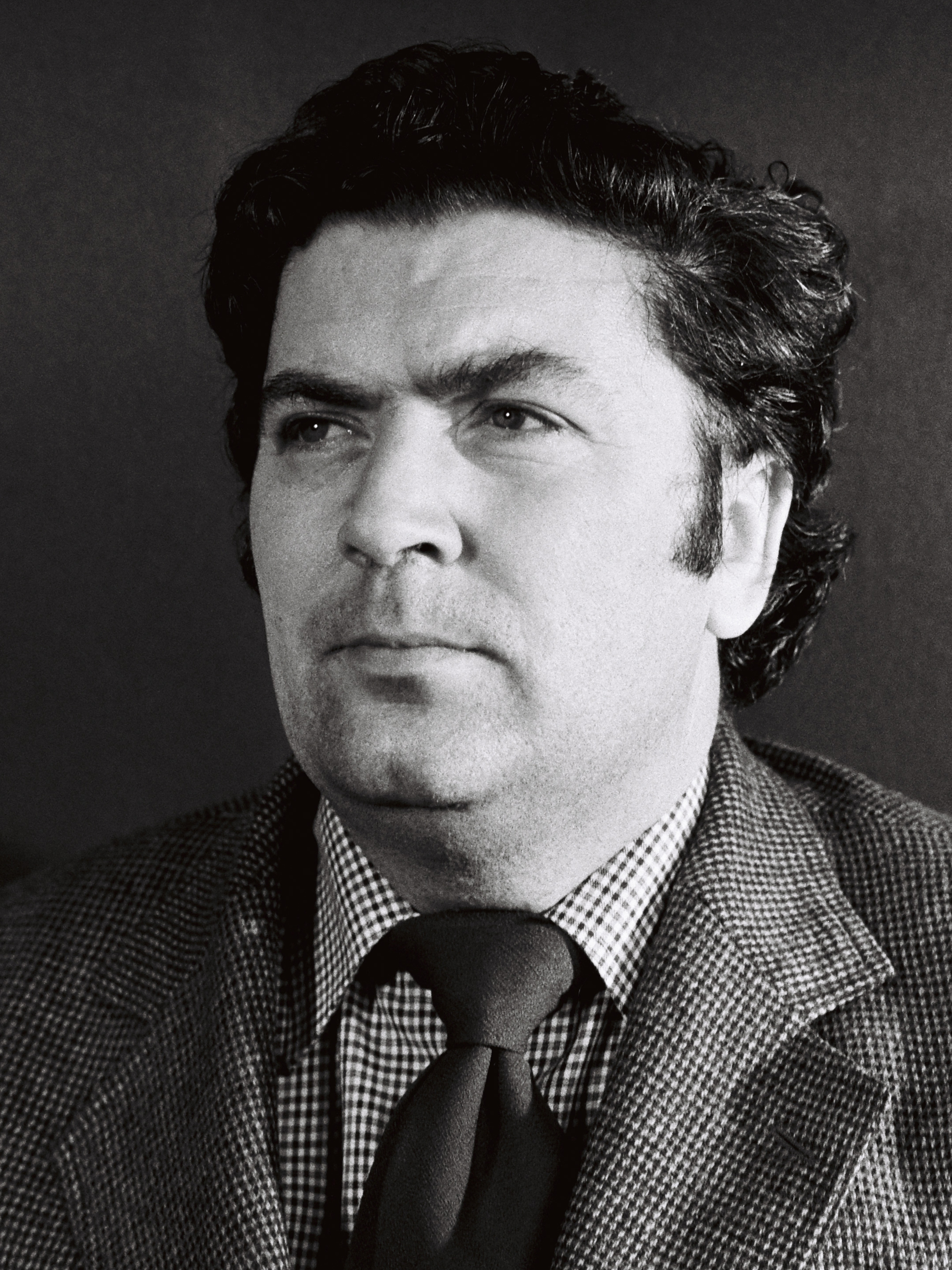

	First party	Second party	Third party
Leader	James Molyneaux	Ian Paisley	John Hume
Party	UUP	DUP	SDLP
Seats won	151	142	104
Seat change	▼25	▲68	▼9
Popular vote	175,965	176,816	116,487
Percentage	26.4%	26.6%	17.5%
Swing	▼3.6%	▲13.8%	▼3.1%
	Fourth party	Fifth party	Sixth party
Leader	Oliver Napier	N/A	Pat Fahy
Party	Alliance	Independent	Irish Independence
Seats won	38	37	21
Seat change	▼32	▼5	▲21
Popular vote	59,397	44,427	25,859
Percentage	8.9%	6.7%	3.9%
Swing	▼5.5%	▼0.9%	New party
- Colours denote the winning party with outright control

- Colours denote the party with the most seats

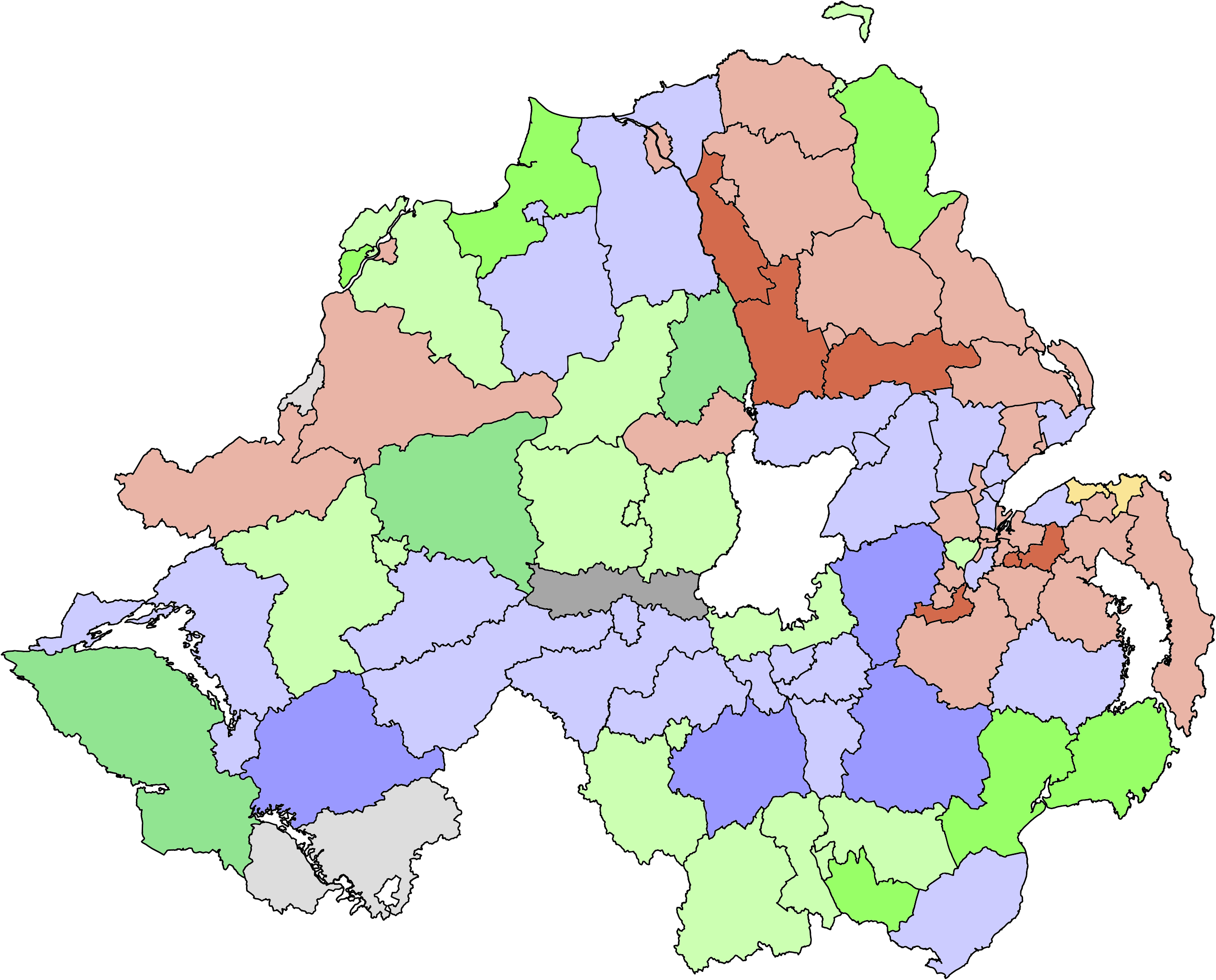
- Colours denote the party with the most first preference votes in each District Electoral Area (darker colours indicate a majority of first preference votes).

Elections for local government were held in Northern Ireland in 1981, contesting 526 seats in all.

== Results ==
=== Overall ===
Party	Councillors		Votes	
Party	Total	+/-	% share	Total
DUP	142	+68	26.6	176,816
UUP	151	-25	26.4	175,965
SDLP	104	-9	17.5	116,487
Alliance	38	-32	8.9	59,397
Independent	37	-5	6.7	44,427
Irish Independence	21	N/A	3.9	25,859
The Workers' Party Republican Clubs	3	-3	1.8	12,059
Ind. Unionist	6	-4	1.2	8,219
UPUP	5	N/A	1.2	7,817
UUUP	5	-7	0.7	4,962
People's Democracy	2	N/A	0.7	4,734
Unionist Party NI	2	-4	0.7	4,478
Irish Republican Socialist	2	N/A	0.5	3,654
NI Labour	1	0	0.5	3,563
PUP	1	N/A	0.5	3,057
New Ulster Political Research	1	N/A	0.4	2,989
Independent Loyalist	2	+1	0.3	1,935
Independent Socialist	1	+1	0.3	1,884
Newtownabbey Labour	1	N/A	0.2	1,113
Labour League	0	N/A	0.1	924
Social Alliance	0	N/A	0.1	898
Independent Labour	1	0	0.1	832
United Democratic	0	N/A	0.1	692
Trade Union Campaign	0	N/A	0.1	439
Independent Alliance	0	N/A	0.1	323
Ind. Nationalist	0	0	0.0	247
Communist	0	0	0.0	201
Unionist Unity	0	0	0.0	196
National Front	0	0	0.0	194
Ecology	0	0	0.0	142
Independent SDLP	0	0	0.0	85
Social Reform Party	0	0	0.0	34
United British Ulster Peoples Party	0	0	0.0	28

=== By council ===
==== Antrim ====
Antrim A
Party	Candidate	1st Pref
UUP	James Graham	1,293
SDLP	Robert Loughran	603
Irish Independence	John Heffron	537
DUP	Wilson Clyde	533
SDLP	Gerard Carolan	429
DUP	Frew Rainey	381
Irish Independence	Desmond McAteer	339
UUP	Jack Blakely	207
Irish Independence	James Totten	164
Alliance	James McConnell	113
Ind. Unionist	Stewart Dunlop	91
UUP	Mary Marshall	76
Turnout		4,901
John Heffron joins IIP		
SDLP gain from Independent		

Antrim B
Party	Candidate	1st Pref
UUP	Thomas Wallace	688
UUP	James Cunningham	684
SDLP	Robert Burns	638
DUP	Roy Thompson	587
DUP	Allister Lucas	554
UUP	Thomas Grant	398
UUP	Alexander Wilson	252
Alliance	John McCourt	195
Alliance	George Luke	134
Turnout		4,251
SDLP gain from Alliance		

Antrim C
Party	Candidate	1st Pref
DUP	Samuel Dunlop	1,719
UUP	Paddy Marks	1,182
UUP	Jack Allen	961
DUP	Charles Quinn	615
Antrim Labour League	John Gibbons	562
Alliance	Michael Donoghue	531
Alliance	Charles Kinahan	465
Alliance	Mary Wallace	266
Antrim Tenants' Association	Philip Henry	243
UUP	Hugh Johnston	204
Turnout		6,984
DUP gain from UUP		

==== Ards ====
Ards A
Party	Candidate	1st Pref
UPUP	Gladys McIntyre	1,034
SDLP	Patrick Doherty	942
DUP	Joseph Thompson	917
DUP	Oliver Johnston	875
UUP	Jim Shannon	741
UUP	Robert Ambrose	609
UUP	John Scott	545
Independent	James McMullan	808
Alliance	William Sheldon	427
UUP	William Caughey	609
Alliance	Alan Burnside	337
UUP	James Kennett	259
UUP	David Hamilton	209
Unionist Party NI	Michael Long	112
UPUP	Frances Millar	100
Turnout		8,162
DUP gain from UUP		
UPUP gain from Alliance		

Ards B
Party	Candidate	1st Pref
DUP	Hugh Boyd	1,681
NI Labour	Robert Gaw	1,310
DUP	Hugh Gibson	1,005
Alliance	Owen Dorrian	784
DUP	John Elliott	670
UPUP	Robert Brown	508
UPUP	James Murray	468
UUP	Robert Hamilton	458
UUP	Hugh Patton	383
UPUP	Hugh Yeaman	360
Alliance	James Murphy	270
UUP	Edward McLoughlin	166
UUP	William Speers	162
NI Labour	John Gray	114
Turnout		8,649
DUP gain from UUP		
UPUP gain from Alliance		

Ards C
Party	Candidate	1st Pref
DUP	Thomas Gourley	1,479
UUP	Hamilton McKeag	1,082
DUP	John Hamilton	752
Alliance	Thomas McBriar	526
Alliance	Kathleen Coulter	348
UUP	Gordon Brown	334
Independent	John Shields	311
Independent	James Middleton	237
UPUP	Robert McKee	222
UUP	James Caughey	213
UPUP	Shirley McWhinney	124
Independent	Thomas Adair	20
Turnout		5,816
DUP gain from Independent		

==== Armagh ====
Armagh A
Party	Candidate	1st Pref
UUP	Ronald Allen	938
DUP	Douglas Hutchinson	878
SDLP	Francis McIlvanna	781
UUP	Samuel Foster	610
SDLP	Francis Kernan	593
DUP	Norman Kerr	244
UUUP	Robert Cummings	74
Turnout		4,296
No change

Armagh B
Party	Candidate	1st Pref
UUP	Jim Speers	1,931
SDLP	Seamus Mallon	1,394
UUP	William McClelland	1,092
DUP	Thomas Black	917
UUP	Robert Turner	742
UUP	Thomas Johnston	733
UUUP	Francis Little	732
DUP	John Alexander	561
DUP	Mervyn Spratt	459
UUUP	Frederick Hamilton	59
Turnout		8,780
No change

Armagh C
Party	Candidate	1st Pref
SDLP	Patrick Fegan	980
UUP	Jim Nicholson	962
SDLP	James McKernan	933
DUP	Joseph McBride	705
SDLP	Joseph Dunleavy	690
Irish Independence	Patrick Agnew	493
UUP	Eleanor Boyd	450
Independent	Peter McSorley	370
Turnout		5,790
DUP gain from UUP		

Armagh D
Party	Candidate	1st Pref
UUP	Frederick Armstrong	1,173
Independent	Barney McManus	1,011
SDLP	Pat Brannigan	807
DUP	Letitia McClenaghan	653
SDLP	Anthony Agnew	617
SDLP	Gerald Grimley	568
UUP	George MacCartney	393
UUP	Norman Creswell	243
Armagh Labour Party	Carson Greer	134
Turnout		5,827
No change

==== Ballymena ====
Ballymena A
Party	Candidate	1st Pref
UUP	Desmond Armstrong	964
Independent	James Woulahan	824
DUP	John Armstrong	823
UUP	James McKay	640
DUP	Samuel Hanna	583
DUP	James Millar	410
Turnout		4,365
No change

Ballymena B
Party	Candidate	1st Pref
DUP	Roy Gillespie	1,254
DUP	Sandy Spence	981
DUP	John Greer	853
DUP	Thomas Nicholl	740
DUP	Hubert Nicholl	740
UUP	Hugh Simpson	537
UUP	William Wright	464
UUP	Robert Nelson	413
UUP	Thomas Smyth	402
UUP	John Sutter	271
Turnout		6,771
Hugh Simpson joins UUP		
UUP gain from Independent		

Ballymena C
Party	Candidate	1st Pref
DUP	Roy West	1,082
DUP	Martin Clarke	978
DUP	Charles Maternaghan	825
DUP	John McAuley	825
UUP	William Brownlees	815
UUP	William Simpson	694
UUP	William McConnell	243
UUUP	Ernest Johnston	108
Turnout		5,713
DUP gain from Independent Unionist		
UUP gain from United Ratepayers		

Ballymena D
Party	Candidate	1st Pref
Independent	Patrick Burke	1,331
DUP	Maurice Mills	1,113
DUP	James Alexander	898
Independent	Samuel Henry	790
DUP	Robert Maternaghan	758
UUP	Gordon Wilson	547
UUP	Kenneth Hood	501
UUP	James Rainey	395
Independent	Samuel Barr	241
Turnout		6,604
DUP gain from Alliance		

==== Ballymoney ====
Ballymoney A
Party	Candidate	1st Pref
DUP	Robert Halliday	575
Alliance	Hugh McFarland	516
DUP	James Patterson	484
UUP	Kenneth Bamford	404
DUP	Robert Wilson	403
UUP	Adam Taylor	188
UUP	Olive Craig	146
Turnout		2,757
Alliance gain from UUP		

Ballymoney B
Party	Candidate	1st Pref
DUP	Charles Steele	791
Independent	Hugh Boyle	615
DUP	William Gracey	474
DUP	Bertie McIlhatton	298
UUP	Joe Gaston	596
UUP	William Logan	362
SDLP	Edward McClements	351
SDLP	Harry Connolly	335
UUP	Mary Ellis	278
SDLP	John Mulholland	271
UUP	Samuel Bartlett	261
Independent	Margaret Donnelly	212
SDLP	Malachy McCamphill	97
Turnout		5,063
DUP gain from UUP and SDLP		

Ballymoney C
Party	Candidate	1st Pref
DUP	Cecil Cousley	747
DUP	Ralph Strong	538
Independent	Mary Holmes	567
Independent	Robert McComb	353
Alliance	Brendan Smyth	352
UUP	James Simpson	328
Independent	Thomas McKenna	152
Turnout		3,102
DUP gain from Alliance and Independent Unionist		

==== Banbridge ====
Banbridge A
Party	Candidate	1st Pref
SDLP	James Walsh	1,092
UUP	Wilson Davidson	939
DUP	Wilfred McFadden	907
Independent	Laurence McCartan	865
UUP	Norman Ferguson	684
UUP	Samuel Cowan	682
Alliance	Kenneth McElroy	573
Ind. Unionist	Hugh Anderson	538
DUP	Gareth Bennett	499
DUP	Irene Todd	422
UUP	Raymond Armstrong	278
DUP	Mildred McDowell	161
UUP	Herbert Plunkett	151
Independent SDLP	Margaret McStraw	318
Turnout		8,135
DUP gain from Independent Unionist		

Banbridge B
Party	Candidate	1st Pref
SDLP	Patrick McAvoy	1,125
DUP	Brian Biggerstaff	750
UUP	Raymond McCullough	709
UUP	Matthew Bailey	589
UUP	George Gamble	525
UUP	Herbert Heslip	493
DUP	David Herron	472
UUP	Robert Hill	445
DUP	Robert McIlroy	445
UUP	Eric Williamson	380
UUP	Robert Barr	366
Dromore Action Committee	Thompson Howe	280
DUP	Robert McGregor	273
Alliance	Ebenezer Mulligan	104
Turnout		7,128
No change

==== Belfast ====
Belfast A
Party	Candidate	1st Pref
DUP	John Foster	3,333
UUP	Jeremy Burchill	2,589
DUP	Raymond McCrea	2,345
UUP	Grace Bannister	2,055
DUP	Sammy Wilson	1,479
Alliance	Donnell Deeny	1,439
SDLP	Alasdair McDonnell	1,262
UUP	Billy Blair	900
Alliance	Mervyn Jones	766
UUP	T. Wilkins	544
Workers' Party	Frank Cullen	418
SDLP	P. T. McGrourty	410
NI Labour	D. Peters	276
UPUP	Ben Horan	187
Independent	John McKeague	99
Communist	James Stewart	97
Turnout		19,133
DUP gain from Alliance		
UUP gain from SDLP		

Belfast B
Party	Candidate	1st Pref
Alliance	Oliver Napier	2,631
DUP	Henry Evans	2,513
Unionist Party NI	Joshua Cardwell	2,327
DUP	Bill Morrison	2,152
UUP	Tommy Patton	2,083
UUP	William Corry	1,733
Alliance	Michael Brown	1,602
DUP	S. Foster	1,464
UUP	Dorothy Dunlop	1,248
DUP	A. Greer	979
Alliance	S. G. Coulson	647
NI Labour	D. McKee	548
New Ulster Political Research	D. P. Scott	434
SDLP	Peter Prendiville	236
Turnout		21,838
DUP gain from UUP		

Belfast C
Party	Candidate	1st Pref
Alliance	David Cook	2,493
UUP	Mary Crooks	2,099
UUP	Andrew Cairns	1,933
DUP	Brian Gibson	1,503
SDLP	Ben Caraher	1,501
UUP	J. J. Dixon Gilmore	1,326
DUP	William Stevenson	1,214
Alliance	Muriel Pritchard	1,158
Alliance	B. Jeffrey	913
DUP	T. McIntyre	729
Unionist Party NI	Victor Brennan	532
Workers' Party	G. Carr	530
Turnout		16,460
DUP gain from Alliance and UPNI		

Belfast D
Party	Candidate	1st Pref
SDLP	Joe Hendron	4,291
People's Democracy	John McNulty	2,781
SDLP	Cormac Boomer	2,070
Independent Socialist	Paddy Devlin	1,343
Workers' Party	Mary McMahon	1,125
Irish Republican Socialist	Gerry Kelly	957
Irish Republican Socialist	W. J. Browning	822
Alliance	Dan McGuinness	725
SDLP	Mary Muldoon	636
UUP	J. Hand	538
Workers' Party	K. Smyth	438
SDLP	Anne McElroy	346
Independent	L. Hunter	167
Alliance	R. Turkington	137
Turnout		17,436
Paddy Devlin leaves SDLP		
People's Democracy gain from Republican Clubs		
IRSP gain from Alliance		

Belfast E
Party	Candidate	1st Pref
DUP	George Haffrey	4,142
UUP	Billy Bell	3,105
DUP	George Seawright	1,989
PUP	Hugh Smyth	1,931
New Ulster Political Research	Sammy Doyle	1,135
Independent	Laurence Kennedy	1,070
Alliance	A. H. Egerton	1,011
Unionist Democracy	Fred Proctor	692
SDLP	Alban Maginness	618
UUP	J. Sands	386
UUP	Alfie Ferguson	367
Independent	P. Hunter	321
Independent	J. Weir	311
Independent	Peter Emerson	202
Workers' Party	Margaret McNulty	177
Turnout		18,081
Hugh Smyth joins PUP		
DUP gain from Alliance		

Belfast F
Party	Candidate	1st Pref
DUP	Billy Dickson	1,913
Irish Republican Socialist	Sean Flynn	1,639
Workers' Party	J. Sullivan	1,002
DUP	Eric Smyth	952
SDLP	Owen Allen	898
Alliance	Will Glendinning	844
UUP	James Stewart	719
SDLP	H. G. Fitzmaurice	719
UUP	L. Cust	638
UUP	H. Fletcher	621
SDLP	Mary Smyth	389
SDLP	T. Lappin	227
Alliance	Paul Maguire	215
Turnout		11,428
DUP gain from UUP		
IRSP gain from Republican Clubs		

Belfast G
Party	Candidate	1st Pref
DUP	Frederick Ashby	1,913
People's Democracy	Fergus O'Hare	1,953
New Ulster Political Research	Sammy Millar	1,420
UUP	Cecil Walker	1,173
Workers' Party	Seamus Lynch	750
SDLP	Brian Feeney	749
UUP	Herbert Ditty	595
Independent Socialist	Gerry Fitt	541
DUP	Joseph Coggle	392
Alliance	P. J. McGarry	313
Turnout		10,336
DUP gain from Alliance		
People's Democracy gain from Republican Clubs		
NUPRG gain from UUP		

Belfast H
Party	Candidate	1st Pref
UUP	John Carson	5,014
SDLP	Paschal O'Hare	3,057
DUP	William Annon	3,010
Ind. Unionist	Frank Millar	1,848
Alliance	John Cushnahan	1,739
NI Labour	Alan Carr	1,000
SDLP	Alban Maginness	818
DUP	William Gault	813
Workers' Party	L. McK. Clarke	553
Alliance	R. O. Jamison	531
PUP	David Overend	503
DUP	Pauline Strong	466
UUP	Raymond Trimble	408
Turnout		20,480
DUP gain from Alliance		

==== Carrickfergus ====
Carrick A
Party	Candidate	1st Pref
United Loyalist	Charles Johnston	819
DUP	William Haggan	559
Alliance	Joan Tomlin	512
DUP	Samuel Irvine	504
UUP	Mary Ardill	458
Unionist Party NI	Anne Dickson	353
Alliance	Stewart Dickson	208
UUP	Ernest Burton	188
Alliance	Robert Gordon	145
UUP	Mary Anderson	133
Turnout		3,977
Charles Johnston leaves UUUC		
DUP gain from UUP and Alliance		

Carrick B
Party	Candidate	1st Pref
DUP	William Cross	748
UUP	Hugh McLean	701
UUP	James Brown	588
Alliance	Patrick Conway	446
DUP	William Knox	359
Alliance	Charles Hilditch	307
DUP	Steven Watters	249
Alliance	Alice Bateman	231
UPUP	Robert Wilson	122
UUP	Henry Cardwell	105
Newtownabbey Labour Party	Richard Hopkins	85
Turnout		4,074
DUP gain from Alliance		

Carrick C
Party	Candidate	1st Pref
DUP	Ken McFaul	1,572
Alliance	Sean Neeson	663
Ind. Unionist	Samuel Murphy	526
PUP	Samuel Stewart	353
DUP	William McKeown	241
UUP	Elizabeth Carson	230
DUP	Jim Strange	167
UUP	Robert Hunter	159
UUP	John Haslett	155
Alliance	Arthur McQuitty	106
Unionist Party NI	Edwin Cummings	30
Turnout		4,367
Samuel Murphy leaves UPNI		
DUP gain from UUP		

==== Castlereagh ====
Castlereagh A
Party	Candidate	1st Pref
DUP	Ernest Harper	1,555
UUP	John Glass	1,104
Independent	William Clulow	1,056
UUP	Frederick Kane	865
Alliance	Philip Grosse	749
Alliance	Samuel Finlay	573
UUP	Bryan Milford	548
DUP	John Hillis	543
Alliance	Ann Smith	502
DUP	James Lowe	438
UPUP	John Moore	420
DUP	Robin Newton	379
Turnout		8,980
Ernest Harper joins DUP		
Independent gain from Alliance		

Castlereagh B
Party	Candidate	1st Pref
DUP	Roy Allen	3,098
DUP	Alan Carson	987
UUP	William Ward	912
UUP	Matthew Anderson	784
Alliance	Felicity Boyd	742
UUP	Leslie Farrington	741
Alliance	Adam Morrow	725
DUP	John Gilpin	444
Alliance	Amy McKeown	383
DUP	Wesley Boyle	347
DUP	John Lamont	277
National Front	Michael Brooks	194
Alliance	Samuel Pyper	124
NI Labour	James Bate	76
NI Labour	William Gunning	65
NI Labour	William Copley	28
Loyalist	Annetta Hynes	11
Turnout		10,334
DUP gain from Independent Unionist and Alliance		

Castlereagh C
Party	Candidate	1st Pref
DUP	Peter Robinson	3,562
Alliance	Patricia Archer	1,048
UUP	Herbert Johnstone	990
Alliance	Bryan Davidson	493
UUP	Walter McFarland	411
DUP	Cedric Wilson	38
DUP	Denny Vitty	35
Turnout		6,836
DUP gain from UUP and Alliance		

==== Coleraine ====
Coleraine A
Party	Candidate	1st Pref
SDLP	John Dallat	1,061
SDLP	Gerard O'Kane	901
UUP	William King	864
DUP	Thomas Malone Jr.	783
Ind. Unionist	William Watt	705
UUP	George McIlrath	690
DUP	Robert Catherwood	680
UUP	James Anderson	446
UUP	Mayne Long	395
DUP	Irwin Holmes	366
Alliance	Anne Lambert	117
Turnout		7,187
DUP gain from Independent Unionist		
SDLP gain from UUP		

Coleraine B
Party	Candidate	1st Pref
DUP	William Creelman	1,119
UUP	William Glenn	674
SDLP	Sean Farren	658
UUP	Albert Clarke	630
DUP	Matthew Kane	540
UUP	Robert Mitchell	493
Alliance	Patrick McGowan	453
UUP	Elizabeth Connolly	423
UUP	John Earl	333
DUP	William Sweeney	309
Alliance	Peter Scott	293
UUP	Thomas Henry	291
DUP	Roy Hilldrup	272
Ecology	Malcolm Samuel	61
Turnout		6,715
DUP gain from Independent and SDLP		

Coleraine C
Party	Candidate	1st Pref
DUP	James McClure	3,203
UUP	Robert White	1,374
Independent	Patrick McFeely	1,174
Independent	William McNabb	746
UUP	Paul Baxter	615
Alliance	William Mathews	500
Independent	Randall Crawford	468
UUP	Matthew Adams	355
Ecology	Avril McCandless	81
DUP	Robert Bolton	69
DUP	William McElfatrick	60
Alliance	Margaret Smith	54
UUP	Antony Alcock	48
DUP	Elizabeth Gaston	39
UUP	Robert Hunter	39
Independent	James Leonard	33
Turnout		9,073
DUP gain from UUP		
Independent gain from Alliance		

==== Cookstown ====
Cookstown A
Party	Candidate	1st Pref
DUP	Kenneth Loughrin	1,087
Independent	Laurence Loughran	1,073
UUP	Samuel Glasgow	1,070
SDLP	Patrick Bradley	722
SDLP	Peter Kelly	563
UUUP	Samuel Parke	470
Turnout		5,149
No change

Cookstown B
Party	Candidate	1st Pref
DUP	William McIntyre	1,502
SDLP	Paddy Duffy	1,197
Independent	Michael McIvor	964
UUP	Victor McGahie	721
UUP	James Howard	720
Independent	Edward Hagan	679
SDLP	Joseph Davidson	605
Turnout		6,535
William McIntyre leaves UUUP		
Victor McGahie leaves UUUP		

Cookstown C
Party	Candidate	1st Pref
DUP	Alan Kane	1,120
SDLP	Brigid Neeson	1,079
SDLP	Margaret Laverty	932
UUP	Espie Donaldson	930
UUP	John Warwick	328
UUP	Alex McConnell	233
Turnout		4,946
DUP gain from UUP		

==== Craigavon ====
Craigavon A
Party	Candidate	1st Pref
Workers' Party	Paddy Breen	1,220
SDLP	James McDonald	999
SDLP	Sean McKavanagh	867
DUP	Victor Pickering	766
UUP	James Gillespie	732
SDLP	Patrick Crilly	652
SDLP	Thomas Fox	563
Social Alliance	Joseph Cunningham	192
UUP	William Lyness	183
Turnout		6,419
No change

Craigavon B
Party	Candidate	1st Pref
UUP	Herbert Whitten	1,785
SDLP	Daniel Murphy	1,343
DUP	Gladys McCullough	1,127
DUP	James Forsythe	802
UUP	Alan Locke	664
Workers' Party	Dermot Hamill	541
UUP	George Hatch	518
Alliance	William Ramsay	415
Alliance	John Hagan	360
DUP	Frederick Richardson	336
DUP	John Oliver	227
Turnout		8,444
DUP gain from Alliance		

Craigavon C
Party	Candidate	1st Pref
Workers' Party	Tom French	1,298
SDLP	Hugh News	1,077
UUP	Mary Simpson	987
UUP	Cyril McLoughlin	775
DUP	Robert Dodds	750
UUP	Jack Mathers	659
DUP	William Smith	650
DUP	Ronald Williamson	617
Alliance	Brian Gee	579
Social Alliance	Alan Evans	398
SDLP	Catherine McCann	391
Social Alliance	George Forker	308
SDLP	Terence McGinnity	270
Independent	Robert McEvoy	250
Ind. Unionist	Frederick Crowe	141
Turnout		9,468
DUP gain from Alliance		
WPRC gain from SDLP		

Craigavon D
Party	Candidate	1st Pref
DUP	Frederick Baird	1,570
UUP	Sydney Cairns	1,151
UUP	Sam Gardiner	1,131
DUP	David Calvert	1,119
UUP	George Savage	1,028
DUP	Ian Williams	872
UUUP	Philip Black	790
SDLP	Gary Kennedy	639
UUUP	Thomas Megarrell	486
UUP	Samuel Lutton	432
Turnout		9,455
DUP gain from UUP		

==== Down ====
Down A
Party	Candidate	1st Pref
DUP	Cecil Harvey	1,387
UUP	Samuel Osborne	954
SDLP	Francis Laverty	809
SDLP	Monica Smyth	751
UUP	Dermot Nesbitt	732
UUP	William Finlay	655
UUP	William Brown	641
SDLP	Thomas Murray	489
DUP	Thomas Poole	477
UUP	James Glover	355
Alliance	John Rodgers	326
Alliance	Wanda Rowan-Hamilton	286
UUP	James Cochrane	275
DUP	Thomas McKee	187
Interdependence	Francis Rice	50
Interdependence	Eileen Rice	24
Turnout		8,614
DUP gain from UUP and Alliance		

Down B
Party	Candidate	1st Pref
SDLP	Edward McGrady	1,711
Workers' Party	Raymond Blaney	1,121
SDLP	Dermot Curran	893
UUP	Cecil Maxwell	875
Labour Party NI	Malachi Curran	665
SDLP	John Ritchie	647
UUP	Elizabeth Kennedy	513
Alliance	George Flinn	451
SDLP	John Bryce	382
SDLP	Sean Quinn	373
Alliance	Michael Healy	305
Turnout		8,188
WPRC gain from SDLP		
Labour gain from Alliance		

Down C
Party	Candidate	1st Pref
SDLP	Paddy O'Donoghue	1,328
DUP	Ethel Smyth	1,137
UUP	Gerald Douglas	939
SDLP	James Magee	826
SDLP	Eamon O'Neill	822
SDLP	James Curry	762
UUP	Norman Bicker	573
Alliance	Patrick Forde	487
SDLP	Stephen McClean	440
Workers' Party	Edward O'Hagan	349
Alliance	Anthony Dickinson	200
UUP	William Keown	182
Workers' Party	David Allister	117
Turnout		8,413
Ethel Smyth leaves UUP		

==== Dungannon ====
Dungannon A
Party	Candidate	1st Pref
Independent	Seamus Cassidy	1,057
SDLP	Anthony McGonnell	889
SDLP	John Monaghan	856
UUP	Noel Mulligan	797
UUP	Samuel Brush	633
DUP	William McIlwrath	583
DUP	Frederick Burrows	570
UUP	Winston Mulligan	549
Turnout		6,026
Independent gain from SDLP		

Dungannon B
Party	Candidate	1st Pref
Independent	Jim Canning	1,744
Independent	Owen Nugent	1,140
SDLP	Patrick McGlinchey	1,138
UUP	Thomas Kempton	918
Independent	John Corr	539
DUP	Abraham White	497
Turnout		6,186
Owen Nugent leaves SDLP		

Dungannon C
Party	Candidate	1st Pref
SDLP	Patsy Daly	1,324
UUP	Derek Irwin	981
DUP	James Ewing	778
UUP	John Taggart	647
DUP	Norman Lockhart	583
UUP	Jim Brady	571
Independent	Wilfred Dilworth	558
UUUP	James McNeill	205
Independent	William Lucas	104
Turnout		5,876
DUP gain from UUP		

Dungannon D
Party	Candidate	1st Pref
DUP	Maurice Morrow	1,124
UUP	Ken Maginnis	1,085
Irish Independence	Plunkett O'Donnell	1,062
UUP	William Brown	1,046
Independent	Michael McLoughlin	751
SDLP	Peggie Devlin	579
Turnout		5,762
Michael McLoughlin leaves SDLP		
UUP gain from Independent		
IIP gain from Independent		

==== Fermanagh ====
Fermanagh A
Party	Candidate	1st Pref
Irish Independence	John McMahon	1,292
UUP	Jack Leahy	1,075
Independent	John Joe McCusker	1,069
Independent	Thomas Murray	849
SDLP	Fergus McQuillan	628
DUP	Caroline Madill	548
Independent	Michael McBarron	528
UUP	Thomas Johnston	329
SDLP	John Reihill	280
Turnout		6,734
John Joe McCusker leaves Unity		
IIP gain from Independent		

Fermanagh B
Party	Candidate	1st Pref
UUP	Cecil Noble	1,660
Irish Independence	Patrick Cox	1,216
UUP	Norman Brown	892
DUP	Roy Coalter	535
UUP	Cyril Crozier	396
SDLP	Thomas Doherty	395
SDLP	Seamus Carson	310
DUP	Margaret Veitch	261
Turnout		5,774
DUP gain from UUUP		
IIP gain from SDLP		

Fermanagh C
Party	Candidate	1st Pref
Irish Independence	Patrick McCaffrey	1,178
UUP	Wilson Elliott	941
Independent	Patrick Flanagan	848
Irish Independence	Annie Cavanagh	816
SDLP	Gerard Gallagher	776
UUP	Herbert Corrigan	693
DUP	George Gott	468
SDLP	Patrick McGovern	200
Turnout		6,094
Patrick McCaffrey leaves Unity		

Fermanagh D
Party	Candidate	1st Pref
UUP	Herbert Kerr	1,241
UUP	Caldwell McClaughrey	1,074
DUP	Bert Johnston	905
SDLP	John O'Kane	843
Irish Independence	Gerry O'Donnell	544
Irish Independence	Patrick Keown	448
SDLP	John Cunningham	396
SDLP	Patrick McGrath	391
DUP	Miriam Cuthbertson	266
Alliance	John Haslett	179
Turnout		6,371
Bert Johnston leaves UUUP		
UUP gain from SDLP		

Fermanagh E
Party	Candidate	1st Pref
UUP	Raymond Ferguson	1,116
Irish Independence	Patrick O'Reilly	825
DUP	Nigel Dodds	767
UUP	Samuel Foster	563
Irish Independence	Edward Bermingham	548
SDLP	Jim Lunny	519
SDLP	Jim Donnelly	456
UUP	Alwin Loane	415
Fermanagh Labour League	Thomas Campbell	362
Alliance	Marjorie Moore	298
SDLP	Roy Tarbotton	242
Turnout		6,253
IIP gain from SDLP		
UUP gain from UUUP		

==== Larne ====
Larne A
Party	Candidate	1st Pref
UUP	Thomas Robinson	897
Independent	William Cunning	875
DUP	Rachel Rea	582
Alliance	Hugh Wilson	469
DUP	Robert Campbell	414
Turnout		3,311
Independent gain from SDLP		

Larne B
Party	Candidate	1st Pref
DUP	John Alexander	647
DUP	Samuel McAllister	600
UUP	Laurence Niblock	547
United Loyalist	Roy Beggs	466
UUP	Alexander Hunter	296
Alliance	William Calwell	241
Turnout		2,865
Laurence Niblock leaves Vanguard		
Roy Beggs leaves DUP		
DUP gain from UUP and Alliance		

Larne C
Party	Candidate	1st Pref
DUP	Jack McKee	1,436
UUP	Robert Robinson	770
DUP	Winston Fulton	509
Alliance	William Kelly	508
Alliance	Thomas Benson	428
Alliance	Amelia Kelly	396
UUP	Rosalie Armstrong	387
UUP	Joseph Wallace	325
United Loyalist	Samuel Martin	262
Community Candidate	James Clements	218
DUP	Leonard Sluman	178
Independent	Agnew Hamilton	156
Community Candidate	Patrick Todd	69
Independent	William Fleck	61
Turnout		5,894
Rosalie Armstrong leaves Vanguard		
DUP gain from Vanguard and Independent		
UUP gain from Independent		

==== Limavady ====
Limavady A
Party	Candidate	1st Pref
SDLP	Arthur Doherty	727
SDLP	Roy King	678
DUP	Ernest Murray	654
UUP	Robert Grant	563
SDLP	Thomas Mullan	562
UUP	Stanley Gault	434
UUP	James Gilfillan	290
Turnout		3,986
No change

Limavady B
Party	Candidate	1st Pref
UUP	David Robinson	883
SDLP	Lawrence Hegarty	571
Independent	Denis Farren	501
UUP	Max Gault	329
Irish Independence	Sean McCloskey	319
SDLP	James Brolly	310
DUP	Alex Fulton	220
Irish Independence	George McCormick	197
Irish Independence	Andrew Murphy	127
DUP	John McKay	75
The Workers' Party Republican Clubs	Jerry Mullan	63
Turnout		3,715
IIP gain from SDLP		

Limavady C
Party	Candidate	1st Pref
DUP	William Norris	729
SDLP	Barry Doherty	653
UUP	William Cooke	650
UUP	William Barbour	622
UUP	Jackie Dolan	595
SDLP	Geraldine Kearny	510
Alliance	Francis Parkinson	223
DUP	George Robinson	133
DUP	Arthur Reid	108
Turnout		4,287
No change

==== Lisburn ====
Lisburn A
Party	Candidate	1st Pref
UUP	Robert Campbell	1,299
DUP	James Wells	1,004
UUP	William Dillon	916
SDLP	John Clenaghan	905
DUP	Charles Woodburne	515
UUP	Henry Stewart	394
Turnout		5,142
No change

Lisburn B
Party	Candidate	1st Pref
DUP	Charles Poots	1,469
UUP	William Bleakes	1,222
UUP	Thomas Lilburn	655
Alliance	John Alderdice	623
DUP	Samuel Dorman	620
DUP	James McCann	469
UUP	Joseph McClullough	447
Independent	William Johnston	351
Turnout		5,977
William Bleakes leaves UUUP		
DUP gain from UUP		

Lisburn C
Party	Candidate	1st Pref
DUP	William Belshaw	2,412
DUP	Denis McCarroll	856
UUP	William Watson	812
Alliance	Seamus Close	811
UUP	Wilfred McClung	585
DUP	Robert Dunsmore	423
UUUP	George Morrison	401
Independent	William Whitley	389
NI Labour	Robert Clarke	107
Turnout		6,992
DUP gain from UUP and UUUP		

Lisburn D
Party	Candidate	1st Pref
DUP	Ivan Davis	3,720
Alliance	George Boyd	1,086
UUP	Samuel Semple	1,069
UUP	Maureen McKinney	788
Alliance	James Mulholland	479
DUP	Robert McNeice	470
UUP	David Trimble	454
Unionist Party NI	David Gordon	232
UUUP	John Curry	153
Turnout		8,639
DUP gain from UPNI		

Lisburn E
Party	Candidate	1st Pref
DUP	William Beattie	1,909
UUP	William McAllister	1,830
SDLP	William McDonnell	1,013
Alliance	John Cousins	542
Workers' Party	Gerard Dunlop	462
Alliance	Brion Fitzsimons	435
UUUP	James Davis	105
Communist	Terry Bruton	72
Turnout		6,831
UUUP gain from Alliance		

==== Londonderry ====
Londonderry A
Party	Candidate	1st Pref
DUP	John Henry	1,412
SDLP	John McNickle	1,018
SDLP	George Peoples	942
UUP	Robert Bond	937
DUP	William Hay	906
SDLP	Thomas Doherty	837
SDLP	Danny Ferguson	808
UUP	Ernest Hamilton	592
UUP	Alan Lindsay	526
Alliance	John Allen	318
Alliance	James Patterson	173
NI Labour	Delap Stevenson	173
Turnout		8,786
DUP gain from UUP		

Londonderry B
Party	Candidate	1st Pref
DUP	Anna Hay	1,586
DUP	Gregory Campbell	1,206
SDLP	Michael Fegan	1,119
UUP	James Guy	1,078
Alliance	Robert McCullough	707
UUP	Robert Ferris	583
UUP	George McNally	496
SDLP	Colm Elliott	462
Irish Independence	Thomas McGlinchley	410
Derry Trades Union Council	Bernard McAnaney	39
Turnout		7,855
DUP gain from Alliance		

Londonderry C
Party	Candidate	1st Pref
SDLP	Patrick Devine	1,566
Irish Independence	John McChrystal	599
SDLP	Anna Gallagher	353
SDLP	Raymond Rogan	312
Irish Independence	Kevin Barr	299
Independent	Samuel Brown	274
SDLP	Joseph Moran	229
Irish Independence	Eileen Doherty	221
Alliance	Gerard O'Grady	213
Ind. Republican	Vincent Coyle	174
Workers' Party	Eamon Melaugh	143
Irish Independence	Patrick Harkin	125
Derry Trades Union Council	Ann Donnelly	75
Ind. Republican	John Carr	61
Turnout		4,891
John McChrystal and Kevin Barr join IIP		

Londonderry D
Party	Candidate	1st Pref
SDLP	William Keys	788
Irish Independence	James Bradley	591
DUP	Margaret Buchanan	507
SDLP	John Tierney	438
SDLP	William McCartney	353
Irish Independence	Roger O'Doherty	182
Alliance	Noel Sinclair	141
Irish Independence	Liam Wray	93
Irish Republican Socialist	Thomas McCourt	92
Derry Trades Union Council	Colm Fox	88
Turnout		3,426
James Bradley joins IIP		
DUP gain from UUP		

Londonderry E
Party	Candidate	1st Pref
SDLP	Frank Donnelly	1,344
Irish Independence	Fergus McAteer	1,203
SDLP	William O'Connell	1,176
SDLP	Leonard Green	984
SDLP	William McCorriston	976
UUP	David Davis	956
Alliance	Ita Breen	563
DUP	Annette Hetherington	560
Irish Independence	James Crossan	349
Irish Independence	Edward Bradley	301
Irish Independence	Denis McIntyre	180
Derry Trades Union Council	John Duffy	164
Irish Republican Socialist	Paul Whoriskey	144
Community Candidate	Michael Shiels	122
Derry Trades Union Council	Bill Webster	73
Turnout		9,377
Fergus McAteer joins IIP		
SDLP gain from Alliance		

==== Magherafelt ====
Magherafelt A
Party	Candidate	1st Pref
Independent	Noel McCusker	1,597
SDLP	Mary McSorley	920
DUP	John Linton	823
SDLP	Patrick Sweeney	705
UUP	John Kenning	569
SDLP	Frank McKendry	459
SDLP	Patrick McBride	403
Ind. Unionist	Francis Thompson	359
Workers' Party	Francis Donnelly	329
Workers' Party	Geraldine Crilly	137
Independent	Peter Merron	53
Turnout		6,483
DUP gain from UUP		
SDLP gain from UUP		
Independent gain from WPRC		

Magherafelt B
Party	Candidate	1st Pref
Irish Independence	John Davey	1,961
UUUP	Robert Overend	1,070
UUP	John Junkin	690
DUP	Thomas Milligan	668
DUP	Alexander Montgomery	512
SDLP	Francis Madden	322
Independent	Vincent O'Neill	300
SDLP	Henry McErlean	284
Turnout		5,985
IIP gain from Independent		

Magherafelt C
Party	Candidate	1st Pref
DUP	William McCrea	2,248
Independent	Bernard Murphy	1,208
SDLP	William Conaghan	696
SDLP	Roddy Gribben	638
SDLP	Michael O'Neill	398
UUP	William Lees	346
UUUP	Ernest Caldwell	309
Alliance	Wilfred Brennen	288
DUP	George Miller	283
UUP	James Artt	256
Independent	John Gregg	38
Turnout		6,855
Independent gain from SDLP		

==== Moyle ====
Moyle A
Party	Candidate	1st Pref
SDLP	Malachy McSparran	477
Independent	Fergus Wheeler	461
SDLP	Gerard Gillan	262
SDLP	Archie McIntosh	248
Irish Independence	John McKay	241
SDLP	Charles Hamill	220
Independent	Thomas O'Neill	96
Independent	Gerard McCarry	83
Irish Independence	Anna Edwards	68
Turnout		2,202
SDLP gain from Independent (x2)		

Moyle B
Party	Candidate	1st Pref
DUP	James Rodgers	445
Ind. Unionist	Price McConaghy	381
Independent	James McShane	345
Independent	Mary Morrison	300
UUP	Robert Getty	299
UUP	Hugh Acheson	253
DUP	Ronnie McIlvar	243
UUP	James McAuley	193
Alliance	Maurice McHenry	142
DUP	Andrew Dobbin	133
Alliance	John Shanks	92
DUP	Samuel Simpson	56
Turnout		2,955
Price McConaghy leaves UUP		
UUP gain from Independent Unionist (x2)		

Moyle C
Party	Candidate	1st Pref
SDLP	Richard Kerr	296
Independent	Archie McAuley	237
SDLP	Michael O'Cleary	222
Irish Independence	Eamonn Scally	178
SDLP	Joseph Donaghy	157
UUP	Elizabeth Johnstone	150
Alliance	Hugh Sayers	139
DUP	Norman Campbell	128
Alliance	Thomas Cecil	92
Turnout		1,647
No change

==== Newry and Mourne ====
Newry and Mourne A
Party	Candidate	1st Pref
SDLP	Colum Murnion	1,346
DUP	George Graham	1,264
UUP	William Russell	1,155
UUP	William Coulter	1,052
SDLP	Anne Marie Cunningham	639
Independent	Arthur Dornan	600
DUP	Robert McConnell	175
Turnout		6,443
No change

Newry and Mourne B
Party	Candidate	1st Pref
SDLP	P. J. Bradley	1,048
SDLP	Jim McCart	847
SDLP	Liam Trainor	595
SDLP	Brian Mulligan	589
Independent	Anthony Williamson	459
UUP	William McCoy	433
Irish Independence	Joe Kearney	412
Alliance	Eithne Doran	174
DUP	Raymond Hanna	135
Independent	Peter Maloy	106
Independent Labour	Johnny Ward	33
Turnout		5,049
SDLP gain from Independent and Alliance		

Newry and Mourne C
Party	Candidate	1st Pref
SDLP	Nan Sands	1,014
DUP	William Sterritt	901
UUP	Violet Cromie	612
SDLP	Patrick Harper	611
UUP	Annie Copeland	466
Independent	James Fagan	395
Alliance	Violet Watts	87
Turnout		4,198
DUP gain from UUP		

Newry and Mourne D
Party	Candidate	1st Pref
Irish Independence	Eugene Markey	1,831
SDLP	John McEvoy	988
UUP	Andrew Moffett	805
UUP	Clarence Morrow	675
SDLP	John Bell	664
SDLP	Thomas McGrath	627
SDLP	Michael McNulty	592
Alliance	Victor Frizell	588
DUP	George McConnell	303
Workers' Party	Brian Mulligan	287
Workers' Party	Matthew Cunningham	203
Irish Independence	Francis McCamley	167
Turnout		8,010
Eugene Markey joins IIP		
IIP gain from Alliance		

Newry and Mourne E
Party	Candidate	1st Pref
Anti H-Block	James Lynch	1,244
SDLP	Pat Toner	925
Independent	Anthony Watters	852
SDLP	James Savage	758
SDLP	Owen Kelly	570
SDLP	Jack McMahon	533
Independent	Sean McCreesh	531
UUP	Elizabeth McConnell	530
Irish Independence	Jim Murphy	447
DUP	Alex Chambers	255
Ind. Republican	Brian Woods	242
Irish Independence	Sean Reavy	83
Turnout		7,212
Jim Murphy joins IIP		
Anti H-Block gain from SDLP		

Newry and Mourne F
Party	Candidate	1st Pref
SDLP	Arthur Ruddy	874
UUP	William McCaigue	752
SDLP	Patrick McElroy	666
Irish Independence	Freddie Kearns	479
SDLP	Louis McGuigan	475
Alliance	Michael McVerry	306
Irish Independence	Kevin McAleenan	277
DUP	Gordon Heslip	258
Irish Independence	P. J. McCann	248
Workers' Party	Edward McKeown	105
Workers' Party	Michael McLoughlin	87
Alliance	Edward Turley	85
Social Reform Party	James Malone	34
Turnout		4,833
IIP gain from Alliance		

==== Newtownabbey ====
Newtownabbey A
Party	Candidate	1st Pref
UUP	James Wilson	850
DUP	Trevor Kirkland	830
DUP	Mary Harkness	818
UUP	Arthur Templeton	758
UUP	John Anderson	710
Ind. Unionist	Sidney Cameron	598
Alliance	Patrick McCudden	550
Turnout		5,243
Sidney Cameron leaves UUP		
DUP gain from Alliance		

Newtownabbey B
Party	Candidate	1st Pref
DUP	David Hanna	1,964
UUP	Fraser Agnew	1,090
UUP	Letitia McCartney	547
UUP	Cecil Stringer	450
Newtownabbey Labour Party	Bob Kidd	433
Workers' Party	Austin Kelly	375
Alliance	John Elliott	363
Alliance	Hugh Montgomery	291
Newtownabbey Labour Party	Alistair Keery	102
Communist	William Stewart	32
Turnout		5,920
Cecil Stringer joins UUP		

Newtownabbey C
Party	Candidate	1st Pref
DUP	Samuel Neill	2,737
UUP	Clifford Forsythe	1,499
UUP	Robert Caul	1,277
Independent	Desmond Dowds	807
Alliance	Claire Martin	560
Alliance	George Jones	534
Alliance	Gordon Mawhinney	460
Newtownabbey Labour Party	Brian Caul	252
Turnout		8,332
Independent gain from Alliance		
UUP gain from UPNI		

Newtownabbey D
Party	Candidate	1st Pref
DUP	James Smith	2,926
Alliance	James Rooney	1,068
Ind. Unionist	George Herron	951
UUP	Ivan Hunter	949
UUP	Arthur Kell	560
UUP	William McKee	520
Independent Alliance	John Drysdale	323
Alliance	John Smith	308
Newtownabbey Labour Party	Thomas Davidson	147
Newtownabbey Labour Party	Lindsay Prior	94
Turnout		8,109
Independent Unionist gain from Alliance		

==== North Down ====
North Down A
Party	Candidate	1st Pref
Ind. Unionist	Edmund Mills	1,216
Alliance	Donald Hayes	812
DUP	Raymond Trousdale	740
Alliance	Jane Copeland	710
UUP	Bruce Mulligan	683
Unionist Party NI	William Bailie	655
UUP	George Allport	605
DUP	Elizabeth Loan	592
Alliance	Julian Hamilton	298
UPUP	Valerie Kinghan	279
UPUP	Margaret McGimpsey	247
Unionist Party NI	Dorothy Smith	56
Turnout		5,610
DUP gain from Alliance		

North Down B
Party	Candidate	1st Pref
UPUP	George Green	1,200
DUP	Wesley Graham	972
DUP	Camphell McCormick	821
Alliance	James Magee	733
DUP	George McMurtry	663
UUP	Chalmers Quee	386
UUP	Phyllis Brown	370
UPUP	Cecil Baniff	306
PUP	Thomas O'Brien	270
Alliance	Anne Wilson	268
UPUP	William Elliott	234
Ind. Unionist	John Shields	233
UPUP	James Boyle	203
United British Ulster Peoples Party	William Johnston	28
Turnout		6,888
George Green leaves Vanguard		
DUP gain from UUP		
UPUP gain from UUP		

North Down C
Party	Candidate	1st Pref
UPUP	Mary O'Fee	1,021
Alliance	William Morrow	959
DUP	Robert Graham	929
UUP	Hazel Bradford	907
Alliance	Brian Wilson	444
UUP	Terence McKeag	422
Alliance	Thomas Rollins	367
UPUP	Maisie McMullan	273
DUP	George McKinnie	263
Turnout		5,720
Mary O'Fee leaves Vanguard		
DUP gain from UUP		

North Down D
Party	Candidate	1st Pref
UUP	Ellie McKay	1,076
UUP	John Auld	803
Alliance	Susan O'Brien	727
DUP	Gordon Dunne	509
Alliance	Michael Clarke	423
Alliance	Irene Cave	391
UPUP	Frederick White	374
DUP	Edith Cole	277
UUP	Thomas Bussell	225
Unionist Party NI	Trevor Boyd	181
UPUP	Eric Griffith	135
Turnout		5,246
DUP gain from UUUP		

==== Omagh ====
Omagh A
Party	Candidate	1st Pref
UUP	Arthur McFarland	846
SDLP	Liam McQuaid	840
Irish Independence	Charles McElholm	771
SDLP	John Skelton	538
Irish Independence	John Fahy	496
UUP	William Montgomery	490
DUP	Ivan Foster	474
SDLP	Vincent O'Brien	376
DUP	George Thompson	330
Unity Unionist	Cecil Anderson	196
Alliance	Dermot McCormack	87
Turnout		5,610
DUP gain from UUP		
IIP gain from Independent		

Omagh B
Party	Candidate	1st Pref
Irish Independence	Patrick Donnelly	623
Independent	John Mullin	604
UUP	Bertie Moses	597
Alliance	Patrick Bogan	570
UUP	John Hutchinson	551
DUP	James McConnell	512
Workers' Party	Tommy Owens	407
SDLP	Eugene Donnelly	393
DUP	William McFarland	254
Turnout		4,631
Patrick Donnelly joins IIP		
DUP gain from UUP		

Omagh C
Party	Candidate	1st Pref
Irish Independence	Patrick Fahy	1,185
DUP	Oliver Gibson	1,026
SDLP	Bernadette Grant	818
Alliance	Aidan Lagan	723
UUP	John Ashenhurst	654
SDLP	Stephen McKenna	513
SDLP	Paddy McGowan	496
UUP	William Thompson	457
SDLP	Arthur Breen	453
Alliance	Richard Hinds	336
DUP	William Caldwell	251
UUP	Alfred Barnett	194
DUP	James Mitchell	173
Irish Independence	Francis Loughran	83
Irish Independence	Michael Kelly	79
Ind. Unionist	Edward Sayers	74
Turnout		7,681
DUP gain from UUP		
IIP gain from SDLP		

Omagh D
Party	Candidate	1st Pref
Irish Independence	Francis Conway	984
SDLP	Brendan Martin	643
DUP	Willis Cooke	576
UUP	John Johnston	427
Ind. Republican	Francis McElroy	375
Irish Independence	Brian McGrath	303
Irish Independence	Patrick Walsh	285
Alliance	John Hadden	235
SDLP	Patrick McCrory	225
SDLP	John McSherry	118
Turnout		4,331
IIP gain from Alliance		
IIP gain from WPRC		
DUP gain from UUP		

==== Strabane ====
Strabane A
Party	Candidate	1st Pref
Independent	Denis McCrory	1,320
DUP	Thomas Kerrigan	1,221
SDLP	Mary McCrea	1,029
UUP	Edward Turner	832
UUP	Ernest Young	672
DUP	Robert Anderson	580
DUP	David Baird	315
Turnout		6,162
DUP gain from UUP		

Strabane B
Party	Candidate	1st Pref
SDLP	John Gallagher	1,101
Independent	Francis McConnell	1,015
UUP	Mary Britton	984
DUP	Samuel Rogers	973
DUP	George McIntyre	827
UUP	Henry Henderson	607
SDLP	Mary McAleer	313
Turnout		5,997
DUP gain from UUP		

Strabane C
Party	Candidate	1st Pref
Independent	James O'Kane	1,250
SDLP	Paul O'Hare	600
SDLP	William Flanagan	578
UUP	Robert Fleming	450
Independent	John O'Kane	418
DUP	Desmond Monteith	371
Anti H-Block	William Gallagher	296
Alliance	Patrick Wallace	288
SDLP	Jane O'Donnell	268
Ind. Nationalist	John McCrory	247
Independent	Michael Dunne	115
Independent	David Fleming	96
Independent	William Crichton	72
Independent	John Tracey	43
Turnout		5,447
Independent gain from SDLP		
