= Shore Road (District Electoral Area) =

District electoral areas in Newtownabbey, Northern Ireland

Shore Road was one of the five district electoral areas in Newtownabbey, Northern Ireland which existed from 1985 to 1993. The district elected five members to Newtownabbey Borough Council, and formed part of the South Antrim constituency for the Northern Ireland Assembly and East Antrim and South Antrim constituencies for the UK Parliament.

It was created for the 1985 local elections, replacing Newtownabbey Area C which had existed since 1973, and contained the wards of Abbey, Cloughfern, Jordanstown, Monkstown and Rostulla. It was abolished for the 1993 local elections and replaced with the Macedon DEA and the University DEA.

== Councillors ==
Election	Councillor (Party)	Councillor (Party)	Councillor (Party)	Councillor (Party)	Councillor (Party)
1989	William McKimmon (Alliance)	Ken Robinson (UUP)	Barbara Gilliland (UUP)	Billy Boyd (DUP)	Jean Boyd (DUP)
1985	Leo McKenna (Alliance)	Robert Caul (UUP)	Barbara Gilliland (UUP)	Billy Boyd (DUP)	Billy Gillespie (DUP)

== 1989 Election ==
1985: 2 x UUP, 2 x DUP, 1 x Alliance

1989: 2 x UUP, 2 x DUP, 1 x Alliance

1985-1989 Change: No change

Shore Road - 5 seats
Party	Candidate	FPv%	Count			
Party	Candidate	FPv%	1	2	3	4
UUP	Barbara Gilliland	23.70%	1,008			
UUP	Ken Robinson*	22.87%	973			
DUP	Billy Boyd*	22.33%	950			
Alliance	William McKimmon	18.08%	769			
DUP	Jean Boyd	3.53%	150	351.31	544.86	767.16
Ind. Unionist	William Ball	5.64%	240	310.93	363.43	376.17
Labour '87	David Lowrie	3.86%	164	184.5	198.85	199.63
Electorate: 10,478 Valid: 4,254 (40.60%) Spoilt: 148 Quota: 710 Turnout: 4,402 (42.01%)

== 1985 Election ==
1985: 2 x UUP, 2 x DUP, 1 x Alliance

Shore Road - 5 seats
Party	Candidate	FPv%	Count						
Party	Candidate	FPv%	1	2	3	4	5	6	7
DUP	Billy Boyd	25.97%	1,370						
UUP	Robert Caul*	25.40%	1,340						
UUP	Ken Robinson	13.50%	712	751.6	1,099.42				
DUP	Billy Gillespie	6.37%	336	712.2	726.48	802.32	810.16	840.62	997.06
Alliance	Leo McKenna	12.09%	638	640.16	657.16	682.12	753.84	800.46	818.72
Ind. Unionist	Desmond Dowds*	5.63%	297	341.28	400.78	492.94	502.12	538.78	668.48
PUP	John Niblock	6.31%	333	342.36	347.8	363.4	368.64	378.82	
Independent	Helen Craig	2.35%	124	134.44	139.2	146.4	160		
Newtownabbey Labour	Thomas Crawford	1.16%	61	63.16	63.84	65.76			
Newtownabbey Labour	James Devlin	0.93%	49	49.36	50.04	50.52			
Independent	Claire Martin*	0.28%	15	15.36	15.7	16.66			
Electorate: 10,409 Valid: 5,275 (50.68%) Spoilt: 117 Quota: 880 Turnout: 5,392 (51.80%)
