= Doagh Road (District Electoral Area) =

District electoral areas in Newtownabbey, Northern Ireland

Doagh Road was one of the five district electoral areas in Newtownabbey, Northern Ireland which existed from 1985 to 1993. The district elected five members to Newtownabbey Borough Council, and formed part of the South Antrim constituency for the Northern Ireland Assembly and South Antrim for the UK Parliament.

It was created for the 1985 local elections, replacing Newtownabbey Area B which had existed since 1973, and contained the wards of Bradan, Coole, Dunanney, Valley and Whitehouse. It was abolished for the 1993 local elections and replaced with the Macedon DEA.

== Councillors ==
Election	Councillor (Party)	Councillor (Party)	Councillor (Party)	Councillor (Party)	Councillor (Party)
1989	Robert Kidd (Labour '87)/ (Newtownabbey Labour)	John Blair (Alliance)	Billy Snoddy (DUP)	Fraser Agnew (UUP)	Andrew Beattie (UUP)
1985	Robert Kidd (Labour '87)/ (Newtownabbey Labour)	Jim Allister (DUP)	David Hollis (DUP)	Fraser Agnew (UUP)	Andrew Beattie (UUP)

== 1989 Election ==
1985: 2 x UUP, 2 x DUP, 1 x Newtownabbey Labour

1989: 2 x UUP, 1 x DUP, 1 x Alliance, 1 x Labour '87

1985-1989 Change: Alliance gain from DUP, Newtownabbey Labour joins Labour '87

Doagh Road - 5 seats
Party	Candidate	FPv%	Count							
Party	Candidate	FPv%	1	2	3	4	5	6	7	8
UUP	Fraser Agnew*	21.70%	761							
Labour '87	Robert Kidd*	20.30%	712							
DUP	Billy Snoddy	17.22%	604							
UUP	Andrew Beattie*	15.00%	526	660.09						
Alliance	John Blair	9.52%	334	337.91	379.91	387.89	389.31	390.03	469.81	512.87
Ind. Unionist	David Hollis*	7.01%	246	254.97	271.56	279.4	294.03	300.79	308.03	392
UUP	Winifred Wright	3.11%	109	131.77	159.07	215.91	225.58	235.42	245.24	
Workers' Party	J. J. Magee	2.22%	78	78	104.88	105.16	109.72	109.84		
Sinn Féin	Liam Collins	2.74%	96	96	102.3	102.3	103.3	103.3		
National Front	David Kerr	1.17%	41	41.46	44.19	44.33				
Electorate: 8,976 Valid: 3,507 (39.07%) Spoilt: 118 Quota: 585 Turnout: 3,625 (40.39%)

== 1985 Election ==
1985: 2 x UUP, 2 x DUP, 1 x Newtownabbey Labour

Doagh Road - 5 seats
Party	Candidate	FPv%	Count									
Party	Candidate	FPv%	1	2	3	4	5	6	7	8	9	10
DUP	Jim Allister	30.01%	1,381									
UUP	Fraser Agnew*	19.90%	916									
DUP	David Hollis	5.61%	258	726.16	737.2	738.2	738.2	844.08				
Newtownabbey Labour	Robert Kidd*	9.47%	436	449.64	452.84	455.84	548	556.08	563.08	693.24	760.12	908.8
UUP	Andrew Beattie	7.71%	355	406.04	507.48	509.48	510.48	518.72	534.72	537.04	572.64	653.24
UUP	Letitia McCartney*	6.67%	307	325.04	348.08	349.24	350.24	360.8	372.8	373.8	381.96	424.36
Alliance	John Elliott*	6.37%	293	298.72	302.08	303.52	309.52	309.68	309.68	334.68	347.68	
All Night Party	Mark Langhammer	4.41%	203	207.84	208.48	229.64	232.64	237.52	241.52	270.68		
Workers' Party	Austin Kelly	4.19%	193	193	193.48	195.64	214.64	215.64	215.64			
DUP	Charles South	2.17%	100	142.68	144.44	145.88	145.88					
Newtownabbey Labour	David Lowrie	2.78%	128	128	128.16	128.16						
All Night Party	Roy Wallace	0.28%	13	13	13							
All Night Party	David Coburn	0.26%	12	12.44	12.92							
All Night Party	Douglas Edwards	0.13%	6	6.44	6.44							
All Night Party	William McClinton	0.02%	1	1	1							
Electorate: 9,960 Valid: 4,602 (46.20%) Spoilt: 184 Quota: 768 Turnout: 4,786 (48.05%)
