= Antrim Line (District Electoral Area) =

District electoral areas in Newtownabbey, Northern Ireland

Antrim Line DEA (1993–2014) within Newtownabbey

Antrim Line was one of the district electoral areas in Newtownabbey, Northern Ireland which existed from 1985 to 2014, one of five DEAs until 1993 and one of four DEAs until 2014. The district elected five members to Newtownabbey Borough Council until 1993 and seven members until 2014, and formed part of the South Antrim constituencies for the Northern Ireland Assembly and UK Parliament and part of the Belfast North constituencies for the Northern Ireland Assembly and UK Parliament.

It was created for the 1985 local elections, replacing Newtownabbey Area D which had existed since 1973, and originally contained the wards of Ballyhenry, Collinbridge, Glebe, Glengormley and Hightown. For the 1993 local elections, it gained another two wards, Burnthill from the abolished Manse Road DEA and Mallusk from the Ballyclare DEA. It was abolished for the 2014 local elections and mainly replaced by the new Glengormley Urban DEA, with Mallusk moving to the new Airport DEA.

== Councillors ==
Election	Councillor (party)	Councillor (party)	Councillor (party)	Councillor (party)	Councillor (party)	Councillor (party)	Councillor (party)
2011	John Blair (Alliance)	Noreen McClelland (SDLP)	Marie MacKessy (Sinn Féin)	Gerard O'Reilly (Sinn Féin)	Mark Cosgrove (UUP)	Audrey Ball (DUP)	Paula Bradley (DUP)
2005	Tom Campbell (Alliance)	Noreen McClelland (SDLP)	Briege Meehan (Sinn Féin)	Janet Crilly (UUP)	Mandy Girvan (DUP)	Nigel Hamilton (DUP)	Paula Bradley (DUP)
2001	Tommy McTeague (SDLP)	Noreen McClelland (SDLP)	Briege Meehan (Sinn Féin)	Janet Crilly (UUP)	Ivan Hunter (UUP)	Nigel Hamilton (DUP)	Arthur Templeton (DUP)
1997	Tommy McTeague (SDLP)	James Rooney (Alliance)	John Blair (NRA)	Edward Crilly (UUP)	Ivan Hunter (UUP)	Arthur Kell (UUP)	Elizabeth Snoddy (DUP)
1993	Tommy McTeague (SDLP)	James Rooney (Alliance)	Elizabeth Frazer (Alliance)	Edward Crilly (UUP)	Arthur Templeton (Independent Unionist)	Arthur Kell (UUP)	Billy Blair (DUP)
1989	Tommy McTeague (SDLP)	James Rooney (Alliance)	James Smith (UUP)	William Green (UUP)	Tommy Kirkham (DUP)	5 seats 1985-1993	5 seats 1985-1993
1985	Mary Harkness (DUP)	James Rooney (Alliance)	Ivan Hunter (UUP)	William Green (UUP)	William McDonnell (DUP)	5 seats 1985-1993	5 seats 1985-1993

== 2011 election ==
2005: 3 x DUP, 1 x Sinn Féin, 1 x Alliance, 1 x SDLP, 1 x UUP

2011: 2 x DUP, 2 x Sinn Féin, 1 x Alliance, 1 x SDLP, 1 x UUP

2005-2011 change: Sinn Féin gain from DUP

Antrim Line - 7 seats
Party	Candidate	FPv%	Count					
Party	Candidate	FPv%	1	2	3	4	5	6
Alliance	John Blair	15.96%	1,367					
DUP	Paula Bradley*	14.27%	1,222					
SDLP	Noreen McClelland*	14.07%	1,205					
Sinn Féin	Marie MacKessy	12.70%	1,088					
DUP	Audrey Ball	12.41%	1,063	1,104.14				
UUP	Mark Cosgrove	6.67%	571	612.14	621.74	719.52	724.92	1,105.92
Sinn Féin	Gerard O'Reilly	10.27%	880	936.78	937.26	940.26	1,055.82	1,064.88
DUP	Paul Livingstone	6.57%	563	596.66	713.9	736.52	740.66	827.94
UUP	Ben Coote	5.06%	433	512.56	521.44	583.72	591.46	
UUP	Kathy Wolff	2.02%	173	216.18	220.26			
Electorate: 17,233 Valid: 8,565 (49.70%) Spoilt: 138 Quota: 1,071 Turnout: 8,703 (50.50%)

== 2005 election ==
2001: 2 x DUP, 2 x UUP, 2 x SDLP, 1 x Sinn Féin

2005: 3 x DUP, 1 x UUP, 1 x SDLP, 1 x Sinn Féin, 1 x Alliance

2001-2005 change: DUP and Alliance gain from UUP and SDLP

Antrim Line - 7 seats
Party	Candidate	FPv%	Count						
Party	Candidate	FPv%	1	2	3	4	5	6	7
DUP	Nigel Hamilton*	21.02%	1,901						
SDLP	Noreen McClelland*	12.23%	1,106	1,106.8	1,146.8				
UUP	Janet Crilly*	12.17%	1,101	1,123	1,185				
Alliance	Tom Campbell	9.50%	859	863.4	958.8	966.9	1,200.9		
DUP	Mandy Girvan	4.70%	425	1,049.4	1,104.6	1,112.7	1,115.7	1,292.7	
DUP	Paula Bradley	8.96%	810	894	928.4	933.8	934.2	1,138.8	
Sinn Féin	Briege Meehan*	8.62%	780	780	787	787	914	918.4	941.4
Sinn Féin	Martin Meehan	7.41%	670	670	670	670	740	741.4	750.4
UUP	Ivan Hunter*	5.70%	516	529.6	561	592.5	609.5		
SDLP	Tommy McTeague*	5.69%	515	515.8	533.8	534.7			
Newtownabbey Ratepayers	Jennifer Irvine	3.29%	298	302.8					
Independent	Arthur Templeton*	0.71%	64	66					
Electorate: 15,963 Valid: 9,045 (56.66%) Spoilt: 190 Quota: 1,131 Turnout: 9,235 (57.85%)

== 2001 election ==
1997: 3 x UUP, 1 x SDLP, 1 x Alliance, 1 x DUP, 1 x Newtownabbey Ratepayers

2001: 2 x DUP, 2 x UUP, 2 x SDLP, 1 x Sinn Féin

1997-2001 change: DUP, SDLP and Sinn Féin gain from UUP, Alliance and Newtownabbey Ratepayers

Antrim Line - 7 seats
Party	Candidate	FPv%	Count									
Party	Candidate	FPv%	1	2	3	4	5	6	7	8	9	10
UUP	Janet Crilly	16.28%	1,704									
DUP	Nigel Hamilton	12.90%	1,350									
UUP	Ivan Hunter*	5.80%	607	869.43	923.58	925.89	978.8	986.73	1,167.63	1,311.63		
DUP	Arthur Templeton	6.11%	640	649.66	661.66	667.45	672.91	1,031.59	1,167.9	1,225.43	1,225.43	1,428.43
SDLP	Tommy McTeague*	10.78%	1,128	1,131.45	1,132.45	1,132.54	1,165.54	1,165.54	1,168	1,206.46	1,266.69	1,293.94
Sinn Féin	Briege Meehan	7.20%	754	754.46	754.46	754.49	756.49	757.49	757.49	760.49	1,264.49	1,265.49
SDLP	Noreen McClelland	8.47%	887	889.3	889.3	889.33	967.56	968.56	973.56	1,007.82	1,081.82	1,097.07
Alliance	Pam Tilson	5.23%	547	555.05	564.05	564.14	619.09	621.09	630.32	739.73	740.73	914.42
UUP	Arthur Kell*	5.12%	536	593.27	612.96	613.38	631.87	636.62	689.23	735.15	736.15	
Sinn Féin	Roisin McGurk	6.14%	643	643	643	643	647	647	647	655.23		
Newtownabbey Ratepayers	John Blair*	3.72%	389	396.82	451.28	451.55	487.39	490.42	524.86			
NI Unionist	Norman Boyd	3.99%	418	426.97	453.89	454.79	464.2	471.52				
DUP	Elizabeth Snoddy*	3.22%	337	347.81	362.27	392.09	402.81					
NI Women's Coalition	Joan Cosgrove	2.86%	299	309.35	323.04	323.19						
Independent	James Beckett	2.18%	228	232.37								
Electorate: 16,969 Valid: 10,467 (61.68%) Spoilt: 261 Quota: 1,309 Turnout: 10,728 (63.22%)

== 1997 election ==
1993: 2 x UUP, 2 x Alliance, 1 x DUP, 1 x SDLP, 1 x Independent Unionist

1997: 3 x UUP, 1 x SDLP, 1 x Alliance, 1 x DUP, 1 x Newtownabbey Ratepayers

1993-1997 change: UUP and Newtownabbey Ratepayers gain from Alliance and Independent Unionist

Antrim Line - 7 seats
Party	Candidate	FPv%	Count							
Party	Candidate	FPv%	1	2	3	4	5	6	7	8
SDLP	Tommy McTeague*	21.82%	1,500							
UUP	Edward Crilly*	19.33%	1,329							
Alliance	James Rooney*	7.17%	493	888.74						
UUP	Ivan Hunter	7.74%	532	533.41	856.11	1,009.11				
UUP	Arthur Kell*	10.94%	752	755.76	831.01	865.01				
DUP	Elizabeth Snoddy	9.41%	647	648.41	662.06	745.51	823.51	823.51	1,033.51	
Newtownabbey Ratepayers	John Blair*	6.72%	462	546.6	556.05	608.15	617.15	619.37	701.37	763.37
Alliance	Tommy Frazer	4.89%	336	473.71	481.76	503.75	504.75	525.54	584.13	605.13
Ind. Unionist	Arthur Templeton*	6.43%	442	445.76	458.01	486.86	505.86	506.1		
Ulster Democratic	Billy Blair*	5.56%	382	382.94	403.24					
Electorate: 16,864 Valid: 6,875 (40.77%) Spoilt: 120 Quota: 860 Turnout: 6,995 (41.48%)

== 1993 election ==
1989: 2 x UUP, 1 x DUP, 1 x Alliance, 1 x SDLP

1993: 2 x UUP, 2 x Alliance, 1 x DUP, 1 x SDLP, 1 x Independent Unionist

1989-1993 change: Alliance and Independent Unionist gain due to the addition of two seats

Antrim Line - 7 seats
Party	Candidate	FPv%	Count				
Party	Candidate	FPv%	1	2	3	4	5
SDLP	Tommy McTeague*	17.85%	1,271				
Ind. Unionist	Arthur Templeton*	17.53%	1,248				
UUP	Edward Crilly	12.69%	904				
Alliance	James Rooney*	10.22%	728	947.52			
DUP	Billy Blair	12.26%	873	873	920.4		
UUP	Arthur Kell*	7.91%	563	564.6	707.1	907.1	
Alliance	Elizabeth Frazer	8.07%	575	634.84	654.04	775.78	826.99
DUP	Tommy Kirkham*	8.72%	621	621.64	665.44	741.54	741.63
UUP	Marell Hunter	3.52%	251	252.6	351.6		
Workers' Party	Brendan Harrison	1.22%	87	172.76	174.56		
Electorate: 15,806 Valid: 7,121 (45.05%) Spoilt: 160 Quota: 891 Turnout: 7,281 (46.06%)

== 1989 election ==
1985: 2 x UUP, 2 x DUP, 1 x Alliance

1989: 2 x UUP, 1 x DUP, 1 x Alliance, 1 x SDLP

1985-1989 change: SDLP gain from DUP

Antrim Line - 5 seats
Party	Candidate	FPv%	Count			
Party	Candidate	FPv%	1	2	3	4
Alliance	James Rooney*	18.97%	908			
DUP	Tommy Kirkham	16.71%	800			
SDLP	Tommy McTeague	14.29%	684	731.71	771.39	868.39
UUP	James Smith	16.19%	775	788.65	796.95	806.95
UUP	William Green*	15.00%	718	725.02	734.06	745.74
UUP	Ivan Hunter*	8.65%	414	420.63	423.89	435.79
DUP	William McDonnell*	4.91%	235	237.86	242.12	250.03
Workers' Party	Brendan Harrison	2.97%	142	156.69	207.36	
Labour '87	Thomas Davidson	2.32%	111	127.77		
Electorate: 10,918 Valid: 4,787 (43.85%) Spoilt: 106 Quota: 798 Turnout: 4,893 (44.82%)

== 1985 election ==
1985: 2 x UUP, 2 x DUP, 1 x Alliance

Antrim Line - 5 seats
Party	Candidate	FPv%	Count					
Party	Candidate	FPv%	1	2	3	4	5	6
UUP	William Green	17.12%	873					
Alliance	James Rooney*	15.51%	791	843	872			
UUP	Ivan Hunter*	13.10%	668	675	676	1,112		
DUP	William McDonnell	14.22%	725	729	731	766	885.72	
DUP	Mary Harkness*	12.51%	638	642	642	680	818.58	852.08
SDLP	Tommy McTeague	8.86%	452	462	756	757	759.46	759.46
UUP	Arthur Kell	10.24%	522	524	527			
SDLP	Margaret Harrison	6.14%	313	334				
Newtownabbey Labour	Thomas Davidson	1.59%	81					
Newtownabbey Labour	Lindsay Prior	0.73%	37					
Electorate: 10,194 Valid: 5,100 (50.03%) Spoilt: 138 Quota: 851 Turnout: 5,238 (51.38%)
