= 1985 Newtownabbey Borough Council election =

Local government election in Northern Ireland

← 1981	15 May 1985	1989 →

All 25 seats to Newtownabbey Borough Council 13 seats needed for a majority
	First party	Second party	Third party
Party	UUP	DUP	Ind. Unionist
Seats won	10	9	3
Seat change	▲1	▲4	0
	Fourth party	Fifth party
Party	Alliance	Newtownabbey Labour
Seats won	2	1
Seat change	▼1	0

Elections to Newtownabbey Borough Council were held on 15 May 1985 on the same day as the other Northern Irish local government elections. The election used five district electoral areas to elect a total of 25 councillors.

== Election results ==
Newtownabbey Borough Council Election Result 1985
Party	Seats	Gains	Losses	Net gain/loss	Seats %	Votes %	Votes	+/−
UUP	10	1	0	▲1	40.0	37.6	9,560	▲3.1
DUP	9	4	1	▲4	36.0	30.8	7,823	▼3.9
Ind. Unionist	2	0	0	▼1	8.0	8.1	2,059	▲2.3
Alliance	2	0	1	▼1	8.0	10.3	2,608	▼5.3
Independent	1	1	0	▲1	0.0	3.2	826	▲2.0
Newtownabbey Labour Party	1	0	0	0	4.0	3.1	792	▼0.7
SDLP	0	0	0	0	0.0	3.8	972	▲3.8
PUP	0	0	0	0	0.0	1.3	333	New
All Night Party	0	0	0	0	0.0	0.9	235	New
Workers' Party	0	0	0	0	0.0	1.3	332	▼0.1

Note: "Votes" are the first preference votes.

== Districts summary ==
Results of the Newtownabbey Borough Council election, 1985 by district
Ward	%	Cllrs	%	Cllrs	%	Cllrs	%	Cllrs	Total Cllrs
Ward	UUP		DUP		Alliance		Others		Total Cllrs
Antrim Line	40.5	2	26.7	2	15.5	1	17.3	0	5
Ballyclare	22.0	1	25.5	1	5.6	0	46.9	3	5
Doagh Road	34.3	2	37.8	2	6.4	0	21.5	1	5
Manse Road	52.2	3	32.3	2	11.5	1	4.0	0	5
Shore Road	38.9	2	32.3	2	12.1	1	16.7	0	5
Total	37.6	10	30.8	9	10.3	2	21.3	4	25

== District results ==
=== Antrim Line ===
1985: 2 x UUP, 2 x DUP, 1 x Alliance

Antrim Line - 5 seats
Party	Candidate	FPv%	Count					
Party	Candidate	FPv%	1	2	3	4	5	6
UUP	William Green	17.12%	873					
Alliance	James Rooney*	15.51%	791	843	872			
UUP	Ivan Hunter*	13.10%	668	675	676	1,112		
DUP	William McDonnell	14.22%	725	729	731	766	885.72	
DUP	Mary Harkness*	12.51%	638	642	642	680	818.58	852.08
SDLP	Tommy McTeague	8.86%	452	462	756	757	759.46	759.46
UUP	Arthur Kell	10.24%	522	524	527			
SDLP	Margaret Harrison	6.14%	313	334				
Newtownabbey Labour	Thomas Davidson	1.59%	81					
Newtownabbey Labour	Lindsay Prior	0.73%	37					
Electorate: 10,194 Valid: 5,100 (50.03%) Spoilt: 138 Quota: 851 Turnout: 5,238 (51.38%)

=== Ballyclare ===
1985: 2 x Independent Unionist, 1 x UUP, 1 x DUP, 1 x Independent

Ballyclare - 5 seats
Party	Candidate	FPv%	Count						
Party	Candidate	FPv%	1	2	3	4	5	6	7
Ind. Unionist	Arthur Templeton*	19.29%	1,007						
DUP	Samuel Gardiner	17.24%	900						
Ind. Unionist	Sidney Cameron*	14.46%	755	804.79	822.61	823.42	881.42		
UUP	Jim Wilson*	11.61%	606	636.68	679.63	680.2	713.59	734.14	1,058.14
Independent	Leonard Hardy	7.45%	389	392.77	402.9	403.17	481.56	774.63	828.64
DUP	Winston Hanna	8.27%	432	449.68	470.59	494.71	501.9	521.15	598.25
UUP	William Christie	7.22%	377	389.35	463.38	464.04	482.59	507.72	
Independent	Nan Foster	5.71%	298	301.12	304.12	304.42	372.55		
Alliance	Albert Reid	5.55%	290	292.21	295.21	295.3			
UUP	Robert McKenzie	3.20%	167	176.36					
Electorate: 10,303 Valid: 5,221 (50.67%) Spoilt: 115 Quota: 871 Turnout: 5,336 (51.79%)

=== Doagh Road ===
1985: 2 x UUP, 2 x DUP, 1 x Newtownabbey Labour

Doagh Road - 5 seats
Party	Candidate	FPv%	Count									
Party	Candidate	FPv%	1	2	3	4	5	6	7	8	9	10
DUP	Jim Allister	30.01%	1,381									
UUP	Fraser Agnew*	19.90%	916									
DUP	David Hollis	5.61%	258	726.16	737.2	738.2	738.2	844.08				
Newtownabbey Labour	Robert Kidd*	9.47%	436	449.64	452.84	455.84	548	556.08	563.08	693.24	760.12	908.8
UUP	Andrew Beattie	7.71%	355	406.04	507.48	509.48	510.48	518.72	534.72	537.04	572.64	653.24
UUP	Letitia McCartney*	6.67%	307	325.04	348.08	349.24	350.24	360.8	372.8	373.8	381.96	424.36
Alliance	John Elliott*	6.37%	293	298.72	302.08	303.52	309.52	309.68	309.68	334.68	347.68	
All Night Party	Mark Langhammer	4.41%	203	207.84	208.48	229.64	232.64	237.52	241.52	270.68		
Workers' Party	Austin Kelly	4.19%	193	193	193.48	195.64	214.64	215.64	215.64			
DUP	Charles South	2.17%	100	142.68	144.44	145.88	145.88					
Newtownabbey Labour	David Lowrie	2.78%	128	128	128.16	128.16						
All Night Party	Roy Wallace	0.28%	13	13	13							
All Night Party	David Coburn	0.26%	12	12.44	12.92							
All Night Party	Douglas Edwards	0.13%	6	6.44	6.44							
All Night Party	William McClinton	0.02%	1	1	1							
Electorate: 9,960 Valid: 4,602 (46.20%) Spoilt: 184 Quota: 768 Turnout: 4,786 (48.05%)

=== Manse Road ===
1985: 3 x UUP, 2 x DUP

Manse Road - 5 seats
Party	Candidate	FPv%	Count						
Party	Candidate	FPv%	1	2	3	4	5	6	7
UUP	George Herron*	26.91%	1,400						
DUP	Edward Cassells	18.87%	982						
UUP	James Robinson	14.15%	736	1,064.32					
DUP	Samuel Neill*	13.47%	701	753.44	764.66	766.04	800.86	898.32	
UUP	James Smith*	7.61%	396	468.2	515.5	516.5	803.22	809.27	836.27
Alliance	George Jones	11.45%	596	616.14	617.9	809.12	826.34	828.54	829.54
UUP	Agnes Sloan	3.56%	185	235.54	362.92	364.36			
SDLP	Bernard Conlon	3.98%	207	207.76	208.64				
Electorate: 10,827 Valid: 5,203 (48.06%) Spoilt: 104 Quota: 868 Turnout: 5,307 (49.02%)

=== Shore Road ===
1985: 2 x UUP, 2 x DUP, 1 x Alliance

Shore Road - 5 seats
Party	Candidate	FPv%	Count						
Party	Candidate	FPv%	1	2	3	4	5	6	7
DUP	Billy Boyd	25.97%	1,370						
UUP	Robert Caul*	25.40%	1,340						
UUP	Ken Robinson	13.50%	712	751.6	1,099.42				
DUP	Billy Gillespie	6.37%	336	712.2	726.48	802.32	810.16	840.62	997.06
Alliance	Leo McKenna	12.09%	638	640.16	657.16	682.12	753.84	800.46	818.72
Ind. Unionist	Desmond Dowds*	5.63%	297	341.28	400.78	492.94	502.12	538.78	668.48
PUP	John Niblock	6.31%	333	342.36	347.8	363.4	368.64	378.82	
Independent	Helen Craig	2.35%	124	134.44	139.2	146.4	160		
Newtownabbey Labour	Thomas Crawford	1.16%	61	63.16	63.84	65.76			
Newtownabbey Labour	James Devlin	0.93%	49	49.36	50.04	50.52			
Independent	Claire Martin*	0.28%	15	15.36	15.7	16.66			
Electorate: 10,409 Valid: 5,275 (50.68%) Spoilt: 117 Quota: 880 Turnout: 5,392 (51.80%)
