= 1993 Newtownabbey Borough Council election =

Local government election in Northern Ireland

← 1989	19 May 1993	1997 →

All 25 seats to Newtownabbey Borough Council 13 seats needed for a majority
	First party	Second party	Third party
Party	UUP	DUP	Alliance
Seats won	10	5	4
Seat change	▼1	▼1	0
	Fourth party	Fifth party	Sixth party
Party	Ind. Unionist	Newtownabbey Labour	SDLP
Seats won	4	1	1
Seat change	▲2	▲1	0
	Seventh party
Party	Labour '87
Seats won	0
Seat change	▼1
- Party with the most votes by district.

Elections to Newtownabbey Borough Council were held on 19 May 1993 on the same day as the other Northern Irish local government elections. The election used four district electoral areas to elect a total of 25 councillors.

== Election results ==
Newtownabbey Borough Council Election Result 1993
Party	Seats	Gains	Losses	Net gain/loss	Seats %	Votes %	Votes	+/−
UUP	10	0	1	▼1	40.0	32.5	7,584	▼13.3
DUP	5	0	1	▼1	20.0	21.3	4,996	▼4.0
Ind. Unionist	4	0	2	▲2	16.0	17.0	3,955	▲6.5
Alliance	4	0	0	0	16.0	16.1	3,739	▲2.1
Newtownabbey Labour Party	1	1	0	▲1	4.0	7.3	1,691	▲0.1
SDLP	1	0	0	0	4.0	5.5	1,271	▲2.4
Workers' Party	0	0	0	0	0.0	0.3	87	▼1.5

Note: "Votes" are the first preference votes.

== Districts summary ==
Results of the Newtownabbey Borough Council election, 1993 by district
Ward	%	Cllrs	%	Cllrs	%	Cllrs	%	Cllrs	%	Cllrs	Total Cllrs
Ward	UUP		DUP		Alliance		SDLP		Others		Total Cllrs
Antrim Line	24.1	2	21.0	1	18.3	2	17.8	1	18.8	1	7
Ballyclare	42.2	3	23.1	1	12.2	0	0.0	0	22.5	1	5
Macedon	28.7	2	20.3	1	13.8	1	0.0	0	37.2	2	6
University	39.0	3	21.4	2	18.0	1	0.0	0	21.6	1	7
Total	32.5	10	21.3	5	16.1	4	5.5	1	24.6	5	25

== Districts results ==
=== Antrim Line ===
1993: 2 x UUP, 2 x Alliance, 1 x DUP, 1 x SDLP, 1 x Independent Unionist

Antrim Line - 7 seats
Party	Candidate	FPv%	Count				
Party	Candidate	FPv%	1	2	3	4	5
SDLP	Tommy McTeague*	17.85%	1,271				
Ind. Unionist	Arthur Templeton*	17.53%	1,248				
UUP	Edward Crilly	12.69%	904				
Alliance	James Rooney*	10.22%	728	947.52			
DUP	Billy Blair	12.26%	873	873	920.4		
UUP	Arthur Kell*	7.91%	563	564.6	707.1	907.1	
Alliance	Elizabeth Frazer	8.07%	575	634.84	654.04	775.78	826.99
DUP	Tommy Kirkham*	8.72%	621	621.64	665.44	741.54	741.63
UUP	Marell Hunter	3.52%	251	252.6	351.6		
Workers' Party	Brendan Harrison	1.22%	87	172.76	174.56		
Electorate: 15,806 Valid: 7,121 (45.05%) Spoilt: 160 Quota: 891 Turnout: 7,281 (46.06%)

=== Ballyclare ===
1993: 3 x UUP, 1 x DUP, 1 x Independent Unionist

Ballyclare - 5 seats
Party	Candidate	FPv%	Count			
Party	Candidate	FPv%	1	2	3	4
Ind. Unionist	Sidney Cameron*	22.49%	942			
UUP	Stephen Turkington*	20.82%	872			
DUP	Samuel Cameron*	16.73%	701			
UUP	James Bingham	13.97%	585	675.72	744.81	
UUP	Leonard Hardy	7.42%	311	416	486.98	608.64
Alliance	Trevor Strain	12.20%	511	529.48	538.09	547.94
DUP	Greg Steele	6.37%	267	289.4	309.35	
Electorate: 11,161 Valid: 4,189 (37.53%) Spoilt: 112 Quota: 699 Turnout: 4,301 (38.54%)

=== Macedon ===
1993: 2 x UUP, 1 x DUP, 1 x Alliance, 1 x Newtownabbey Labour, 1 x Independent Unionist

Macedon - 6 seats
Party	Candidate	FPv%	Count					
Party	Candidate	FPv%	1	2	3	4	5	6
UUP	Andrew Beattie*	16.27%	907					
Newtownabbey Labour	Mark Langhammer	14.59%	813					
DUP	Billy Snoddy*	11.64%	649	653.92	656.92	672.4	1,000.4	
UUP	David Hollis	9.80%	546	595.56	595.56	713.2	763.36	830.24
Alliance	John Blair*	13.80%	769	775.84	779.96	788.44	795.56	801.72
Ind. Unionist	Billy Boyd*	9.11%	508	535.36	536.48	610.44	676.52	785.64
Newtownabbey Labour	Robert Kidd*	10.89%	607	609.64	656.88	663.12	686.6	706.84
DUP	Billy DeCourcy	8.72%	486	491.28	492.28	501.64		
UUP	Samuel Martin	2.60%	145	153.04	153.04			
Ind. Unionist	Norman Boyd	1.58%	88	89.44	89.44			
Newtownabbey Labour	Thomas Davidson	1.00%	56	56.48				
Electorate: 13,176 Valid: 5,574 (42.30%) Spoilt: 218 Quota: 797 Turnout: 5,792 (43.96%)

=== University ===
1993: 3 x UUP, 2 x DUP, 1 x Alliance, 1 x Independent Unionist

University - 7 seats
Party	Candidate	FPv%	Count							
Party	Candidate	FPv%	1	2	3	4	5	6	7	8
Ind. Unionist	Fraser Agnew*	18.24%	1,169							
UUP	George Herron*	13.43%	861							
UUP	James Robinson*	8.18%	524	588	604.31	608.95	702.66	728.76	1,003.76	
UUP	Barbara Gilliland*	5.63%	361	515.24	533.23	545.36	620.75	639.19	803.19	
DUP	Tony Lough	8.46%	542	556.72	557.98	558.62	567.01	712.89	737.29	769.29
DUP	Alan Hewitt	6.94%	445	464.84	468.06	471.06	492.8	658.49	687.07	755.07
Alliance	Gordon Mawhinney*	9.10%	583	592.28	593.26	649.58	661.18	675.13	716.09	736.09
Alliance	William McKimmon*	8.94%	573	582.6	584	651.32	658.45	665.44	688.99	711.99
UUP	Ken Robinson*	8.33%	534	566.64	572.31	578.63	591.08	614.7		
DUP	Samuel Neill*	5.96%	382	407.28	409.87	416.51	425.43			
UUP	Elizabeth McClenaghan	3.43%	220	246.88	255	262				
Newtownabbey Labour	Deborah Hayes	1.75%	112	114.56	114.77					
Newtownabbey Labour	Stafford Ward	0.92%	59	59.96	59.96					
Newtownabbey Labour	William McClinton	0.69%	44	45.92	45.99					
Electorate: 15,330 Valid: 6,409 (41.81%) Spoilt: 148 Quota: 802 Turnout: 6,557 (42.77%)
