= Manse Road (District Electoral Area) =

District electoral areas in Newtownabbey, Northern Ireland

Manse Road was one of the five district electoral areas in Newtownabbey, Northern Ireland which existed from 1985 to 1993. The district elected five members to Newtownabbey Borough Council, and formed part of the South Antrim constituencies for the Northern Ireland Assembly and UK Parliament.

It was created for the 1985 local elections, replacing Newtownabbey Area C and Newtownabbey Area D which had existed since 1973, and contained the wards of Ballyduff, Burnthill, Carnmoney, Hawthorne and Mossley. It was abolished for the 1993 local elections and replaced with the Antrim Line DEA and the University DEA.

== Councillors ==
Election	Councillor (Party)	Councillor (Party)	Councillor (Party)	Councillor (Party)	Councillor (Party)
1989	Gordon Mawhinney (Alliance)	Samuel Neill (DUP)	Arthur Kell (UUP)	James Robinson (UUP)	George Herron (UUP)
1985	Edward Cassells (DUP)	Samuel Neill (DUP)	James Smith (UUP)	James Robinson (UUP)	George Herron (UUP)

== 1989 Election ==
1985: 3 x UUP, 2 x DUP

1989: 3 x UUP, 1 x DUP, 1 x Alliance

1985-1989 Change: Alliance gain from DUP

Manse Road - 5 seats
Party	Candidate	FPv%	Count		
Party	Candidate	FPv%	1	2	3
UUP	George Herron*	37.56%	1,762		
UUP	James Robinson*	19.48%	914		
UUP	Arthur Kell	6.46%	303	1,131.78	
DUP	Samuel Neill*	15.20%	713	800.78	
Alliance	Gordon Mawhinney	15.46%	725	768.89	904.25
Ind. Unionist	Thomas Buchanan	2.11%	99	109.83	305.35
Workers' Party	Brendan Heaney	3.73%	175	182.41	196.98
Electorate: 11,302 Valid: 4,691 (41.51%) Spoilt: 134 Quota: 782 Turnout: 4,825 (42.69%)

== 1985 Election ==
1985: 3 x UUP, 2 x DUP

Manse Road - 5 seats
Party	Candidate	FPv%	Count						
Party	Candidate	FPv%	1	2	3	4	5	6	7
UUP	George Herron*	26.91%	1,400						
DUP	Edward Cassells	18.87%	982						
UUP	James Robinson	14.15%	736	1,064.32					
DUP	Samuel Neill*	13.47%	701	753.44	764.66	766.04	800.86	898.32	
UUP	James Smith*	7.61%	396	468.2	515.5	516.5	803.22	809.27	836.27
Alliance	George Jones	11.45%	596	616.14	617.9	809.12	826.34	828.54	829.54
UUP	Agnes Sloan	3.56%	185	235.54	362.92	364.36			
SDLP	Bernard Conlon	3.98%	207	207.76	208.64				
Electorate: 10,827 Valid: 5,203 (48.06%) Spoilt: 104 Quota: 868 Turnout: 5,307 (49.02%)
