= 2011 Newtownabbey Borough Council election =

Local government election in Northern Ireland

- 5 May 2011

All 25 seats to Newtownabbey Borough Council 13 seats needed for a majority
	First party	Second party	Third party
Party	DUP	UUP	Alliance
Seats won	12	5	5
Seat change	Steady	▼1	▲3
	Fourth party	Fifth party	Sixth party
Party	Sinn Féin	SDLP	Independent
Seats won	2	1	0
Seat change	▲1	Steady	▼1
	Seventh party	Eighth party
Party	Newtownabbey Ratepayers	United Unionist
Seats won	0	0
Seat change	▼1	▼1
- Party with the most votes by district.

Elections to Newtownabbey Borough Council were held on 5 May 2011 on the same day as the other Northern Irish local government elections. The election used four district electoral areas to elect a total of 25 councillors.

== Election results ==
Newtownabbey Borough Council Election Result 2011
Party	Seats	Gains	Losses	Net gain/loss	Seats %	Votes %	Votes	+/−
DUP	12	1	1	Steady	48.0	43.5	11,947	▼0.4
UUP	5	0	1	▼1	10.0	19.7	5,407	▼3.6
Alliance	5	3	0	▲3	10.0	16.4	4,496	▲8.4
Sinn Féin	2	1	0	▲1	4.0	9.6	2,647	▲3.7
SDLP	1	0	0	Steady	2.0	5.3	1,467	▼0.8
Independent	0	0	0	▼1	0.0	3.2	877	▲1.0
PUP	0	0	0	Steady	0.0	1.8	506	▲0.8
BNP	0	0	0	Steady	0.0	0.4	104	New

Note: "Votes" are the first preference votes.

== Districts summary ==
Results of the Newtownabbey Borough Council election, 2011 by district
Ward	%	Cllrs	%	Cllrs	%	Cllrs	%	Cllrs	%	Cllrs	%	Cllrs	Total Cllrs
Ward	DUP		UUP		Alliance		Sinn Féin		SDLP		Others		Total Cllrs
Antrim Line	33.3	2	13.7	1	16.0	1	23.0	2	14.1	1	0.0	0	7
Ballyclare	55.2	3	29.6	1	15.2	1	0.0	0	0.0	0	0.0	0	5
Macedon	57.6	4	8.7	1	15.8	1	9.7	0	0.0	0	8.3	0	6
University	37.2	3	25.2	2	18.1	2	2.7	0	3.3	0	13.5	0	7
Total	43.5	12	19.7	5	16.4	5	9.6	2	5.3	1	5.5	0	25

== Districts results ==
=== Antrim Line ===
2005: 3 x DUP, 1 x Sinn Féin, 1 x Alliance, 1 x SDLP, 1 x UUP
2011: 2 x DUP, 2 x Sinn Féin, 1 x Alliance, 1 x SDLP, 1 x UUP
2005-2011 Change: Sinn Féin gain from DUP

Antrim Line - 7 seats
Party	Candidate	FPv%	Count					
Party	Candidate	FPv%	1	2	3	4	5	6
Alliance	John Blair	15.96%	1,367					
DUP	Paula Bradley*	14.27%	1,222					
SDLP	Noreen McClelland*	14.07%	1,205					
Sinn Féin	Marie MacKessy	12.70%	1,088					
DUP	Audrey Ball	12.41%	1,063	1,104.14				
UUP	Mark Cosgrove	6.67%	571	612.14	621.74	719.52	724.92	1,105.92
Sinn Féin	Gerard O'Reilly	10.27%	880	936.78	937.26	940.26	1,055.82	1,064.88
DUP	Paul Livingstone	6.57%	563	596.66	713.9	736.52	740.66	827.94
UUP	Ben Coote	5.06%	433	512.56	521.44	583.72	591.46	
UUP	Kathy Wolff	2.02%	173	216.18	220.26			
Electorate: 17,233 Valid: 8,565 (49.70%) Spoilt: 138 Quota: 1,071 Turnout: 8,703 (50.50%)

=== Ballyclare ===
2005: 3 x DUP, 2 x UUP
2011: 2 x DUP, 1 x UUP, 1 x Alliance
2005-2011 Change: Alliance gain from UUP

Ballyclare - 5 seats
Party	Candidate	FPv%	Count			
Party	Candidate	FPv%	1	2	3	4
DUP	Paul Girvan*	41.96%	2,545			
DUP	Victoria Girvan	6.30%	382	1,484.27		
UUP	James Bingham*	14.79%	897	980.57	1,008.92	1,095.92
Alliance	Pat McCudden	15.23%	924	977.07	994.08	1,014.96
DUP	Jackie Mann	6.94%	421	598.51	982.45	998.32
UUP	Vera McWilliam*	11.76%	713	788.64	822.66	895.88
UUP	Gavin Eastwood	3.02%	183	205.57	213.94	
Electorate: 12,689 Valid: 6,065 (47.80%) Spoilt: 109 Quota: 1,011 Turnout: 6,174 (48.66%)

=== Macedon ===
2005: 3 x DUP, 1 x UUP, 1 x Newtownabbey Ratepayers, 1 x Independent
2011: 4 x DUP, 1 x UUP, 1 x Alliance
2005-2011 Change: DUP gain from Independent, Newtownabbey Ratepayers joins Alliance

Macedon - 6 seats
Party	Candidate	FPv%	Count						
Party	Candidate	FPv%	1	2	3	4	5	6	7
DUP	Billy DeCourcy*	23.90%	1,146						
Alliance	Billy Webb*	15.77%	756						
DUP	Thomas Hogg	12.12%	581	864.31					
DUP	Victor Robinson*	14.08%	675	757.41					
DUP	Dineen Walker*	7.53%	361	408.56	563.27	626.82	640.47	840.47	
UUP	John Scott*	8.66%	415	432.22	443.29	447.8	476.27	571.67	639.67
Sinn Féin	Mary Gillen	9.68%	464	468.92	469.46	469.87	485.47	493.93	496.93
Independent	Tommy Kirkham*	8.26%	396	419.78	426.8	429.67	440.46		
Electorate: 10,707 Valid: 4,794 (44.77%) Spoilt: 122 Quota: 685 Turnout: 4,916 (45.91%)

=== University ===
2005: 3 x DUP, 2 x UUP, 1 x Alliance, 1 x United Unionist
2011: 3 x DUP, 2 x UUP, 2 x Alliance
2005-2011 Change: Alliance gain from UUP, United Unionist joins UUP

University - 7 seats
Party	Candidate	FPv%	Count									
Party	Candidate	FPv%	1	2	3	4	5	6	7	8	9	10
DUP	William Ball*	16.54%	1,328									
DUP	Pamela Barr	12.64%	1,015									
UUP	Fraser Agnew*	12.02%	965	981.56	994.56	994.56	1,116.56					
Alliance	Tom Campbell*	11.26%	904	909.04	912.04	931.04	944.28	952.04	1,067.04			
DUP	Robert Hill*	8.04%	645	907.56	930.8	933.8	958.92	971.53	978.77	978.77	1,151.77	
UUP	Ken Robinson*	9.09%	730	734.08	745.08	746.08	868.04	937.88	950.12	950.69	1,107.69	
Alliance	Lynn Frazer*	6.79%	545	548.6	551.6	571.84	582.08	592.75	736.72	796	836.1	860.1
Independent	Stephen Ross	5.99%	481	485.08	497.08	501.08	521.8	528.59	576.59	578.3	627.79	662.79
PUP	Phil Hamilton	6.30%	506	516.8	536.04	536.04	549.76	553.64	562.64	563.21		
SDLP	Dominic Mulligan	3.26%	262	262.48	262.48	409.48	410.48	411.45				
UUP	Barbara Gilliland*	4.07%	327	335.64	339.64	339.64						
Sinn Féin	James McKeown	2.68%	215	215.48	218.48							
BNP	Stephen Parkes	1.30%	104	105.68								
Electorate: 16,063 Valid: 8,027 (49.97%) Spoilt: 163 Quota: 1,004 Turnout: 8,190 (50.99%)
