= Ballyclare (District Electoral Area) =

District electoral area in Northern Ireland

- Antrim and Newtownabbey Borough Council DEA constituency

Current constituency
- Created: 1985
- Seats: 5 (1985-)
- Councillors: Jeannie Archibald (DUP); Lewis Boyle (APNI); Helen Magill (DUP); Vera McWilliam (UUP); Michael Stewart (IND)

Ballyclare DEA within Antrim and Newtownabbey

Ballyclare DEA (1993-2014) within Newtownabbey

Ballyclare is one of the seven district electoral areas (DEA) in Antrim and Newtownabbey, Northern Ireland. The district elects five members to Antrim and Newtownabbey Borough Council and contains the wards of Ballyclare East, Ballyclare West, Ballynure, Ballyrobert and Doagh. Ballyclare forms part of the South Antrim constituencies for the Northern Ireland Assembly and UK Parliament.

It was created for the 1985 local elections, replacing Newtownabbey Area A which had existed since 1973, where it originally contained five wards (Ballyclare North, Ballyclare South, Ballynure, Doagh and Mallusk). For the 1993 local elections it lost Mallusk to Antrim Line DEA, while a new Ballyrobert ward was created within the DEA.

== Councillors ==
Election	Councillor (party)	Councillor (party)	Councillor (party)	Councillor (party)	Councillor (party)
2023	Michael Stewart (Independent)	Lewis Boyle (Alliance)	Vera McWilliam (UUP)	Jeannie Archibald (DUP)	Helen Magill (DUP)
September 2020 co-option	Michael Stewart (Independent)	Norrie Ramsey (UUP)	Vera McWilliam (UUP)	Jeannie Archibald (DUP)	Mandy Girvan (DUP)
2019	Michael Stewart (Independent)	Danny Kinahan (UUP)	Vera McWilliam (UUP)	Jeannie Archibald (DUP)	Mandy Girvan (DUP)
November 2015 defection	David Arthurs (UUP)/ (TUV)	James Bingham (UUP)	Vera McWilliam (UUP)	Tim Girvan (DUP)	Mandy Girvan (DUP)
2014	David Arthurs (UUP)/ (TUV)	James Bingham (UUP)	Vera McWilliam (UUP)	Tim Girvan (DUP)	Mandy Girvan (DUP)
2011	Pat McCudden (Alliance)	James Bingham (UUP)	Jackie Mann (DUP)	Victoria Girvan (DUP)	Paul Girvan (DUP)
2005	Vera McWilliam (UUP)	James Bingham (UUP)	Etta Mann (DUP)	Pamela Hunter (DUP)	Paul Girvan (DUP)
2001	Vera McWilliam (UUP)	James Bingham (UUP)	Edward Turkington (UUP)	Pamela Hunter (DUP)	Paul Girvan (DUP)
1997	Vera McWilliam (UUP)	James Bingham (UUP)	Edward Turkington (UUP)	Pat McCudden (Alliance)	Paul Girvan (DUP)
1993	Stephen Turkington (UUP)	James Bingham (UUP)	Leonard Hardy (UUP)	Sidney Cameron (Independent Unionist)	Samuel Cameron (DUP)
1989	Stephen Turkington (UUP)	Thomas Downes (UUP)	Arthur Templeton (Independent Unionist)	Sidney Cameron (Independent Unionist)	Samuel Cameron (DUP)
1985	Jim Wilson (UUP)	Leonard Hardy (Independent)	Arthur Templeton (Independent Unionist)	Sidney Cameron (Independent Unionist)	Samuel Gardiner (DUP)

== 2023 election ==
2019: 2 x UUP, 2 x DUP, 1 x Independent

2023: 2 x DUP, 1 x UUP, 1 x Alliance, 1 x Independent

2019–2023 change: Alliance gain from UUP

Ballyclare - 5 seats
Party	Candidate	FPv%	Count				
Party	Candidate	FPv%	1	2	3	4	5
DUP	Jeannie Archibald*	23.18%	1,655				
DUP	Helen Magill	13.18%	947	1,297.46			
UUP	Vera McWilliam*	15.74%	1,131	1,151.52	1,159.79	1,620.79	
Alliance	Lewis Boyle	13.60%	977	984.02	1,103.02	1,129.29	1,234.29
Independent	Michael Stewart*	12.92%	928	937.99	990.99	1,041.5	1,153.5
TUV	Mel Lucas	10.40%	747	791.55	793.82	845.14	1,004.14
UUP	Norrie Ramsay*	8.41%	604	615.07	619.34		
Green (NI)	Robert Robinson	1.52%	109	109.81			
Sinn Féin	Gerard Magee	1.20%	86	86.27			
Electorate: 14,151 Valid: 7,184 (50.77%) Spoilt: 64 Quota: 1,198 Turnout: 7,248 (51.22%)

== 2019 election ==
2014: 2 x UUP, 2 x DUP, 1 x TUV

2019: 2 x UUP, 2 x DUP, 1 x Independent

2014-2019 change: Independent gain from TUV

Ballyclare - 5 seats
Party	Candidate	FPv%	Count					
Party	Candidate	FPv%	1	2	3	4	5	6
UUP	Danny Kinahan †	18.54%	1,253					
Independent	Michael Stewart	17.49%	1,182					
UUP	Vera McWilliam*	10.46%	707	790.4	1,073.2	1,084.95	1,109.3	1,233.3
DUP	Jeannie Archibald	10.93%	739	745.4	754.1	756.55	1,054.6	1,130.6
DUP	Mandy Girvan*	12.74%	861	865	876.1	880.65	1,006.8	1,091.8
Alliance	Gary English	11.47%	775	783.9	799.5	811.35	819.55	900.55
Independent	David Arthurs*	6.76%	457	462.9	473.7	496.2	503.75	
DUP	Austin Orr	6.56%	443	445.9	465.2	466.8		
UUP	Norman Ramsey	5.05%	341	352.8				
Electorate: 13,190 Valid: 6,758 (51.24%) Spoilt: 63 Quota: 1,127 Turnout: 6,821 (51.71%)

== 2014 election ==
2011: 3 x DUP, 1 x UUP, 1 x Alliance

2014: 2 x DUP, 2 x UUP, 1 x TUV

2011-2014 change: UUP and TUV gain from DUP and Alliance

Ballyclare - 5 seats
Party	Candidate	FPv%	Count				
Party	Candidate	FPv%	1	2	3	4	5
DUP	Mandy Girvan*	16.57%	930	938			
UUP	James Bingham*	14.59%	819	831	886	936	
DUP	Tim Girvan*	10.40%	584	589	621	654	1,057
UUP	Vera McWilliam	14.52%	815	828	856	895	938
TUV	David Arthurs ‡‡	13.36%	750	766	834	853	900
Alliance	Pat McCudden*	9.85%	553	581	585	720	730
DUP	Jordan Greer	8.78%	493	500	515	526	
NI21	Gary English	5.56%	312	343	348		
PUP	Scott McDowell	3.81%	214	220			
Independent	David McMaster	1.85%	104				
Independent	Robert Moore	0.69%	39				
Electorate: 12,408 Valid: 5,613 (45.24%) Spoilt: 71 Quota: 936 Turnout: 5,684 (45.81%)

== 2011 election ==
2005: 3 x DUP, 2 x UUP

2011: 2 x DUP, 1 x UUP, 1 x Alliance

2005-2011 change: Alliance gain from UUP

Ballyclare - 5 seats
Party	Candidate	FPv%	Count			
Party	Candidate	FPv%	1	2	3	4
DUP	Paul Girvan*	41.96%	2,545			
DUP	Victoria Girvan	6.30%	382	1,484.27		
UUP	James Bingham*	14.79%	897	980.57	1,008.92	1,095.92
Alliance	Pat McCudden	15.23%	924	977.07	994.08	1,014.96
DUP	Jackie Mann	6.94%	421	598.51	982.45	998.32
UUP	Vera McWilliam*	11.76%	713	788.64	822.66	895.88
UUP	Gavin Eastwood	3.02%	183	205.57	213.94	
Electorate: 12,689 Valid: 6,065 (47.80%) Spoilt: 109 Quota: 1,011 Turnout: 6,174 (48.66%)

== 2005 election ==
2001: 3 x UUP, 2 x DUP

2005: 3 x DUP, 2 x UUP

2001-2005 change: DUP gain from UUP

Ballyclare - 5 seats
Party	Candidate	FPv%	Count				
Party	Candidate	FPv%	1	2	3	4	5
DUP	Paul Girvan*	50.74%	3,402				
DUP	Pamela Hunter*	2.68%	180	1,896.54			
DUP	Etta Mann	2.60%	174	371.65	1,104.55	1,127.55	
UUP	James Bingham*	13.80%	925	1,031.53	1,042.03	1,089.01	1,193.01
UUP	Vera McWilliam*	10.96%	735	850.91	860.51	931.21	1,093.21
UUP	Edward Turkington*	8.99%	603	691.44	701.64	746.59	841.59
Alliance	Patrick Sweeney	6.73%	451	457.7	458	511.61	
NI Conservatives	Alan Greer	3.50%	235	261.13	264.43		
Electorate: 12,101 Valid: 6,705 (55.41%) Spoilt: 155 Quota: 1,118 Turnout: 6,860 (56.69%)

== 2001 election ==
1997: 3 x UUP, 1 x DUP, 1 x Alliance

2001: 3 x UUP, 2 x DUP

1997-2001 change: DUP gain from Alliance

Ballyclare - 5 seats
Party	Candidate	FPv%	Count						
Party	Candidate	FPv%	1	2	3	4	5	6	7
DUP	Paul Girvan*	34.22%	2,583						
DUP	Pamela Hunter	4.08%	308	1,449.4					
UUP	Vera McWilliam*	16.31%	1,231	1,265.32					
UUP	James Bingham*	15.79%	1,192	1,232.56	1,296.91				
UUP	Edward Turkington*	7.17%	541	560.76	604.57	673.67	701.03	783.91	1,108.91
Alliance	Pat McCudden*	10.08%	761	774.52	783.1	813.61	814.51	880.12	927.12
UUP	Peter Walker	3.54%	267	272.72	284.94	307.49	311.27	339.53	
PUP	Norman Lavery	3.30%	249	270.84	291.12	305.8	307.87	327.17	
Independent	Sharon Parkes	3.27%	247	254.8	272.22	285.6	287.22		
NI Conservatives	Alan Greer	2.24%	169	188.76	204.75				
Electorate: 12,666 Valid: 7,548 (59.59%) Spoilt: 186 Quota: 1,259 Turnout: 7,734 (61.06%)

== 1997 election ==
1993: 3 x UUP, 1 x DUP, 1 x Independent Unionist

1997: 3 x UUP, 1 x DUP, 1 x Alliance

1993-1997 change: Alliance gain from Independent Unionist

Ballyclare - 5 seats
Party	Candidate	FPv%	Count						
Party	Candidate	FPv%	1	2	3	4	5	6	7
UUP	James Bingham*	19.68%	847						
DUP	Paul Girvan	16.38%	705	719.1					
Alliance	Pat McCudden	13.62%	586	588.85	596.85	598.85	613.3	701.3	755.3
UUP	Vera McWilliam	11.09%	477	532.8	549.95	565.7	610.05	670.05	729.05
UUP	Edward Turkington	8.41%	362	384.65	401.4	424.45	479.9	518.65	641.3
UUP	Peter Walker	8.09%	348	358.65	367.25	378.85	396.45	425.45	482
Ind. Unionist	Samuel Cameron*	6.09%	262	268.75	286.9	316.15	354.3	399.6	
Newtownabbey Ratepayers	Etta Mann	6.02%	259	259.9	269.9	275.05	296.35		
PUP	Norman Lavery	5.23%	225	228.15	230.15	263.2			
Ulster Democratic	Dave Burgess	3.18%	137	142.85	145				
Ind. Unionist	Leslie Porter	2.21%	95	96.95					
Electorate: 11,796 Valid: 4,303 (36.48%) Spoilt: 79 Quota: 718 Turnout: 4,382 (37.15%)

== 1993 election ==
1989: 2 x Independent Unionist, 2 x UUP, 1 x DUP

1993: 3 x UUP, 1 x DUP, 1 x Independent Unionist

1989-1993 change: UUP gain from Independent Unionist

Ballyclare - 5 seats
Party	Candidate	FPv%	Count			
Party	Candidate	FPv%	1	2	3	4
Ind. Unionist	Sidney Cameron*	22.49%	942			
UUP	Stephen Turkington*	20.82%	872			
DUP	Samuel Cameron*	16.73%	701			
UUP	James Bingham	13.97%	585	675.72	744.81	
UUP	Leonard Hardy	7.42%	311	416	486.98	608.64
Alliance	Trevor Strain	12.20%	511	529.48	538.09	547.94
DUP	Greg Steele	6.37%	267	289.4	309.35	
Electorate: 11,161 Valid: 4,189 (37.53%) Spoilt: 112 Quota: 699 Turnout: 4,301 (38.54%)

== 1989 election ==
1985: 2 x Independent Unionist, 1 x UUP, 1 x DUP, 1 x Independent

1989: 2 x Independent Unionist, 2 x UUP, 1 x DUP

1985-1989 change: UUP gain from Independent

Ballyclare - 5 seats
Party	Candidate	FPv%	Count					
Party	Candidate	FPv%	1	2	3	4	5	6
UUP	Stephen Turkington	21.48%	969					
Ind. Unionist	Arthur Templeton*	19.13%	863					
UUP	Thomas Downes	15.98%	721	846.12				
Ind. Unionist	Sidney Cameron*	12.52%	565	594.67	656.62	697.15	791.15	
DUP	Samuel Cameron	9.55%	431	442.96	461.26	478.48	527.16	600.94
DUP	Samuel Gardiner*	7.96%	359	384.3	396.3	414.57	456.23	507.23
Alliance	Trevor Strain	7.16%	323	326.22	332.37	334.26	399.81	
Independent	Leonard Hardy*	6.23%	281	297.79	308.29	319.63		
Electorate: 11,546 Valid: 4,512 (39.08%) Spoilt: 106 Quota: 753 Turnout: 4,618 (40.00%)

== 1985 election ==
1985: 2 x Independent Unionist, 1 x UUP, 1 x DUP, 1 x Independent

Ballyclare - 5 seats
Party	Candidate	FPv%	Count						
Party	Candidate	FPv%	1	2	3	4	5	6	7
Ind. Unionist	Arthur Templeton*	19.29%	1,007						
DUP	Samuel Gardiner	17.24%	900						
Ind. Unionist	Sidney Cameron*	14.46%	755	804.79	822.61	823.42	881.42		
UUP	Jim Wilson*	11.61%	606	636.68	679.63	680.2	713.59	734.14	1,058.14
Independent	Leonard Hardy	7.45%	389	392.77	402.9	403.17	481.56	774.63	828.64
DUP	Winston Hanna	8.27%	432	449.68	470.59	494.71	501.9	521.15	598.25
UUP	William Christie	7.22%	377	389.35	463.38	464.04	482.59	507.72	
Independent	Nan Foster	5.71%	298	301.12	304.12	304.42	372.55		
Alliance	Albert Reid	5.55%	290	292.21	295.21	295.3			
UUP	Robert McKenzie	3.20%	167	176.36					
Electorate: 10,303 Valid: 5,221 (50.67%) Spoilt: 115 Quota: 871 Turnout: 5,336 (51.79%)
