= United Labour Party (Northern Ireland) =

Defunct political party in Northern Ireland

- Leader: Paddy Devlin
- Founded: June 1978
- Dissolved: 1987
- Succeeded by: Labour '87
- Ideology: Democratic socialism
- Political position: Centre-left

The United Labour Party was a minor political party in Northern Ireland.

The party was founded in June 1978 by Paddy Devlin, formerly of the Social Democratic and Labour Party (SDLP), and a group of former Northern Ireland Labour Party (NILP) members, including John Coulthard and Bob Kidd. Devlin had been expelled from the SDLP after accusing it of no longer being socialist, while the party viewed the NILP as having become sectarian.

The party held that the partition of Ireland could only be ended if endorsed by the majority of people in Northern Ireland, and called for legal changes to reduce the power of any future Northern Ireland Executive. It described its long-term aim as the establishment of a democratic socialist government in Northern Ireland, and aimed to achieve this through working with other labour groups throughout the British Isles, including the British Labour Party and Irish Labour Party.

Devlin stood as a United Labour Party candidate in the 1979 European Parliament election but polled just 6,122 first preferences (1.1% of those cast) and thereby lost his deposit. In the same year, Kidd stood for the party in South Antrim at the UK general election, winning 2.6% of the votes. The party's only other contest was Brian Caul, who stood in the 1982 Belfast South by-election, winning just 0.7% of the votes cast.

In 1987, the group joined with the NILP and other small groups to form the Labour '87 coalition.
