= Walter McFarland =

Northern Ireland footballer and coach

Personal information
- Position: Defender

Senior career*
| Years | Team | Apps | (Gls) |
| 1962–1976 | Crusaders | | |
- Ballyclare Cormrades

International career
| 1968 | Northern Ireland Amateur | 2 | (0) |
- * Club domestic league appearances and goals

Walter McFarland (1945 – 15 August 2014) was a Northern Irish footballer and coach, who played for Irish League side Crusaders during the 1960s and 70s.

== Biography ==
Walter McFarland enjoyed an illustrious career playing for Crusaders from 1962 to 1976. During this time, the team, captained by Walter on many occasions, played in Europe against such sides as Liverpool and Valencia. Walter then became a coach at Crusaders, in addition to becoming Player/Manager of Ballyclare Comrades. He later captained the Belfast Showbiz Charity Team.

Walter also became the first competitor from Northern Ireland to win the All-Ireland Judo Championship and in 1999 he won a silver medal in the World Veterans Championships. Walter then went on to become the World Masters Champion in 2001.

In September 2007, Walter was inducted into the Crusaders' Hall of Fame.

Walter won the World Masters Judo Championships on 2 occasions and founded Abbey Judo Club based in Newtownabbey, Northern Ireland. Walter spent most of his adult years developing and working with children and adults from all aspects of the community in the Valley Leisure centre.

== Honours ==
Crusaders

- Irish League (2): 1972/73, 1975/76
- Irish Cup (2): 1966/67, 1967/68
- County Antrim Shield (3): 1964/65, 1968/69, 1973/74
- Ulster Cup (1): 1963/64
- Carlsberg Cup (1): 1973/74
