= Gordon Mawhinney =

Northern Irish politician (born 1943)

Deputy Leader of the Alliance Party of Northern Ireland
- In office 1987–1991
- Leader: John Alderdice
- Preceded by: Addie Morrow
- Succeeded by: Seamus Close

Member of Newtownabbey Borough Council
- In office 19 May 1993 – 21 May 1997
- Preceded by: District created
- Succeeded by: Lynn Frazer
- Constituency: University
- In office 17 May 1989 – 19 May 1993
- Preceded by: Edward Cassells
- Succeeded by: District abolished
- Constituency: Manse Road

Member of the Northern Ireland Assembly for South Antrim
- In office 20 October 1982 – 1986
- Preceded by: Assembly re-established
- Succeeded by: Assembly dissolved

Personal details
- Born: 4 January 1943 (age 83) Antrim, Northern Ireland
- Party: Alliance Party

Gordon Hugh Mawhinney (born 4 January 1943) is a Northern Irish former politician.

== Biography ==
Mawhinney married Maureen Gribben (born 5 January 1943) on 4 April 1967. In 1981, Mawhinney stood for the Alliance Party of Northern Ireland in Newtownabbey District "C", but was not elected. He was elected to the Northern Ireland Assembly, 1982, in South Antrim. He stood in the equivalent Westminster constituency at the 1983 general election, receiving 11.9% of the votes cast, and increased his share to 16.0% at the 1987 general election, in which he took second place.

In 1987, Mawhinney was elected as Deputy Leader of the Alliance Party, a position which he held until he resigned in 1991, claiming "health and business reasons". In 1989, he finally won a seat on Newtownabbey Borough Council, in Manse Road In 1993, he won a seat in the successor district of University, but he did not restand in 1997.

Northern Ireland Assembly (1982)
New assembly	MPA for South Antrim; 1982–1986	Assembly abolished
Party political offices
Preceded by Addie Morrow	Deputy Leader of the Alliance Party of Northern Ireland; 1987–91	Succeeded by Seamus Close
