= Ken Robinson (Northern Ireland politician) =

Northern Ireland politician (1942–2022)

Mayor of Newtownabbey
- In office 1991–1992

Member of Newtownabbey Borough Council
- In office 19 May 1993 – 22 May 2014
- Preceded by: District created
- Succeeded by: Council abolished
- Constituency: University
- In office 15 May 1985 – 19 May 1993
- Preceded by: District created
- Succeeded by: District abolished
- Constituency: Shore Road

Member of the Northern Ireland Assembly for Antrim East
- In office 25 June 1998 – 5 May 2011
- Preceded by: New Creation
- Succeeded by: Oliver McMullan

Personal details
- Born: 2 June 1942
- Died: 4 October 2022 (aged 80) Jordanstown, Northern Ireland
- Party: Ulster Unionist Party
- Education: Queen's University, Belfast
- Website: Ken Robinson

Ken Robinson (2 June 1942 – 4 October 2022) was an Ulster Unionist Party (UUP) politician who was a Member of the Northern Ireland Assembly (MLA) for East Antrim from 1998 to 2011.

== Early life and education ==
Robinson was born on 2 June 1942. He was educated at Ballyclare High School, Queen's University, Belfast and Stranmillis College. Before entering politics, he was Head of Cavehill Primary School.

== Political career ==
Robinson was a former Newtownabbey Borough Councillor (1985–1993 and 1995–1997). He has served as both Mayor (1991–1992) and Deputy-Mayor, and was Vice Chair of the Economic Development Committee (1995–1998).

He was first elected an MLA in 1998, and re-elected in 2003 and 2007.

He was a member of the Committee of the Centre and the Education Committee in the 1998–2003 Assembly. Robinson was a member of the Committee for Culture, Arts and Leisure and the Committee on Procedures until his retirement from Stormont in March 2011. This followed on from his announcement in September 2010 that he was not seeking re-selection from the Ulster Unionist East Antrim Constituency Association.

On 20 September 2010, he announced his retirement from the Assembly, telling his constituency association in East Antrim that he would not be putting his name forward for next years assembly elections.

== Death ==
Robinson died in Jordanstown on 4 October 2022, at the age of 80.

Civic offices
| Preceded by Fraser Agnew | Mayor of Newtownabbey; 1991–1992 | Succeeded by Arthur Templeton |
Northern Ireland Assembly
| New assembly | MLA for East Antrim; 1998–2011 | Succeeded by Oliver McMullan |
