= Newtownabbey Labour Party =

Political party in Northern Ireland

- Abbreviation: NLP
- Founded: 1974
- Split from: Northern Ireland Labour Party
- Headquarters: Newtownabbey
- Ideology: Social democracy; British unionism
- Political position: Centre-left
- National affiliation: Labour '87

The Newtownabbey Labour Party (NLP) is a minor political party based in Newtownabbey, Northern Ireland. It was formed in 1974 as a split from the Northern Ireland Labour Party. It has elected one member to the Newtownabbey Borough Council, Bob Kidd, who served from 1985 to 1993. In 1987, the NLP joined other Labour parties in Northern Ireland in forming the Labour '87 political coalition. Under the Labour '87 banner, Mark Langhammer was elected to the Newtownabbey Borough Council in 1993 and was in office until 2005.

== History ==
The Newtownabbey Labour Party (NLP) originated as the Newtownabbey branch of the Northern Ireland Labour Party (NILP). It left its parent organisation in 1974, in opposition to the NILP's broad support for the Ulster Workers Council strike. Early members included future British Labour Party member of parliament Kate Hoey.

The party stood in the 1982 Northern Ireland Assembly election, but it only mustered 560 votes. However, NLP candidate Bob Kidd was able to win a seat on the Newtownabbey Borough Council in the 1985 local elections. In 1987, the NLP, Northern Ireland Labour Party, Ulster Liberal Party, and United Labour Party formed Labour '87, a political coalition which aimed to unite the Labour parties of Northern Ireland. Kidd held his seat under the Labour '87 banner in the 1989 local elections. Although he lost in 1993, Mark Langhammer, also standing for Labour '87, was elected onto council. He held his seat in 1997, then again as an independent in 2001, before standing down in the 2005 local elections.

For the 1996, Northern Ireland Peace Forum, the party stood as part of the Labour coalition, which had two members elected. It supported the Socialist Environmental Alliance in the 2004 local elections.
