= Labour Party of Northern Ireland =

UK political party

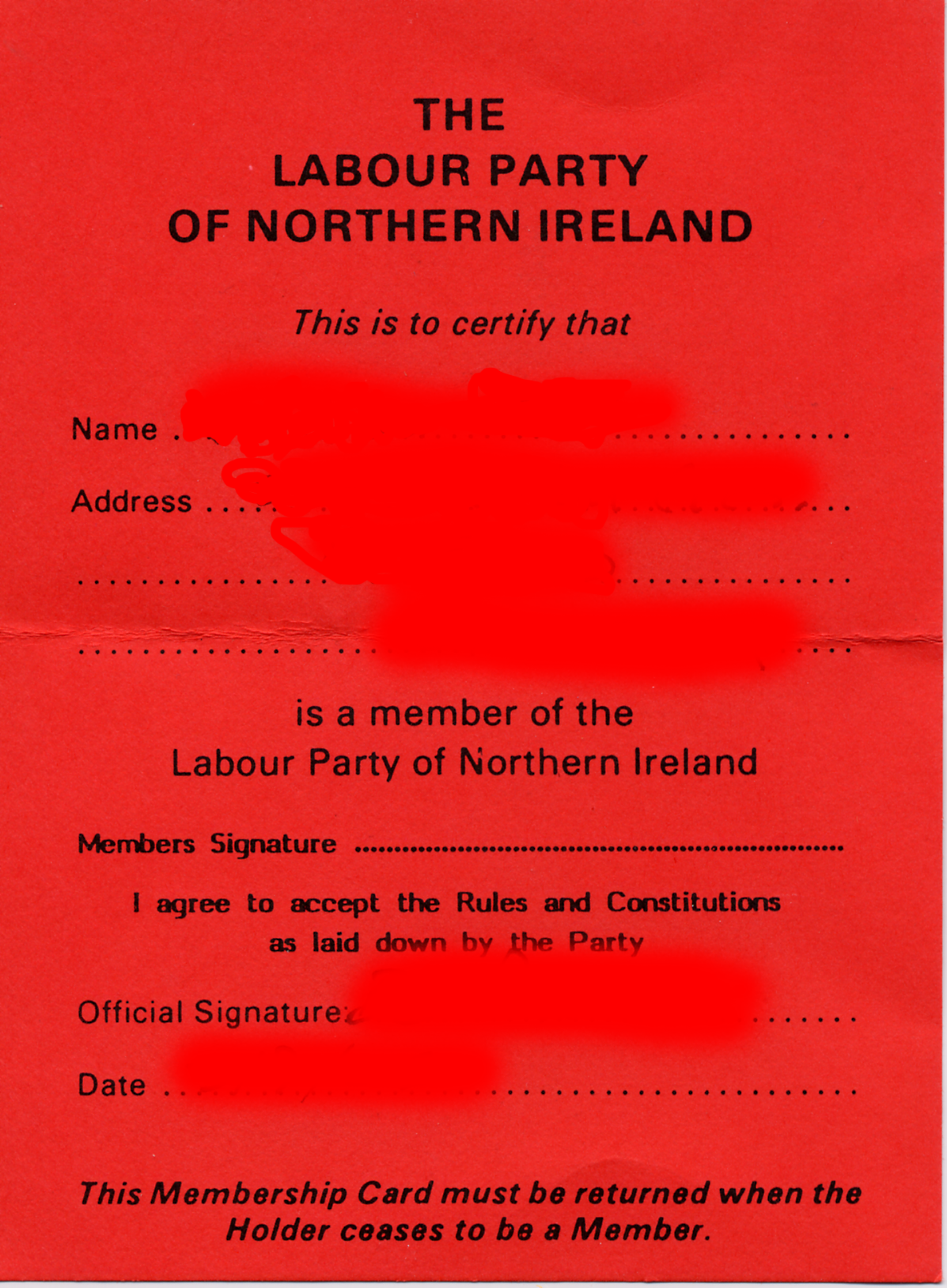
A specimen of the membership card for the Labour Party of Northern Ireland

The Labour Party of Northern Ireland (LPNI) was the name of two distinct political parties in Northern Ireland, the first formed in 1985 by a group around Paddy Devlin, a former Social Democratic and Labour Party councillor and Northern Ireland Assembly member, and Billy Blease, a member of the British House of Lords, and the second formed by Malachi Curran in 1998.

== History ==
The initial organisation stood several candidates in the 1985 local government elections, none of whom were successful. In 1987, the group merged with the Northern Ireland Labour Party, Ulster Liberal Party and the United Labour Party to form a party known as Labour '87 or Labour Party 1987 with the aim of campaigning for a united Labour Party. This group also gained the support of the Newtownabbey Labour Party. It hoped to build links with the British Labour Party, but this came to nothing.

The group ran unsuccessful candidates in the 1989 local elections and the 1989 European Parliament election, after which the Labour '87 coalition seems to have been dropped. The LPNI survived a little longer, but appears to have dissolved in 1990.

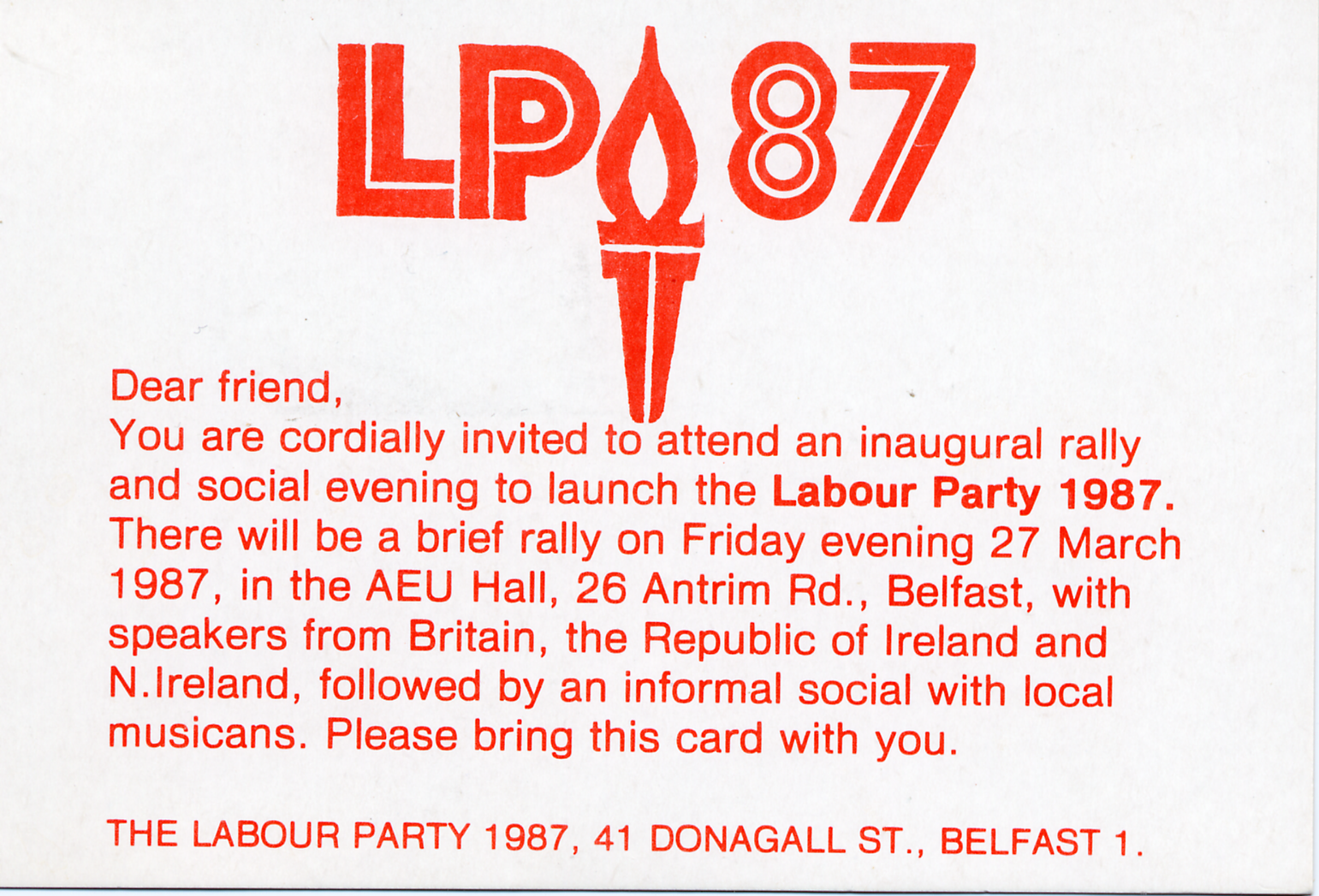
Launch invitation for the Labour Party 1987

== Labour coalition and new LPNI ==
The next attempt to form a labour organisation in Northern Ireland was the Labour coalition, which won seats on the Northern Ireland Forum in 1996. This split in 1998, and a group around Malachi Curran founded a new "Labour Party of Northern Ireland". This group ran candidates in the Northern Ireland Assembly election, including David Bleakley. Curran stood unsuccessfully in the 2007 Assembly election, coming last. The party was deregistered with the Electoral Commission in 2016.
