= Tom Campbell (Northern Ireland politician) =

Northern Irish politician, former High Sheriff of Belfast

Member of Antrim and Newtownabbey Borough Council
- Incumbent
- Assumed office 22 May 2014
- Preceded by: New council
- Constituency: Three Mile Water

Member of Newtownabbey Borough Council
- In office 5 May 2011 – 22 May 2014
- Preceded by: Barbara Gilliland
- Succeeded by: Council abolished
- Constituency: University
- In office 5 May 2005 – 5 May 2011
- Preceded by: Tommy McTeague
- Succeeded by: John Blair
- Constituency: Antrim Line

High Sheriff of Belfast
- In office January 2000 – January 2001
- Preceded by: Robin Newton
- Succeeded by: Alan Crowe

Member of Belfast City Council
- In office 21 May 1997 – 7 June 2001
- Preceded by: Johnathan Stevenson
- Succeeded by: Pat Convery
- Constituency: Castle
- In office 15 May 1985 – 19 May 1993
- Preceded by: New district
- Succeeded by: Johnathan Stevenson
- Constituency: Castle

Personal details
- Born: August 1958 (age 67); Belfast, Northern Ireland
- Political party: Alliance Party

Thomas Campbell (born August 1958) is a Northern Irish solicitor and Alliance Party politician who has been an Antrim and Newtownabbey Borough Councillor for the Three Mile Water DEA since 2014. Prior to this, he had been a councillor in the former Newtownabbey Borough, having been first elected in 2005.

From 1985 until 2001, Campbell also sat on Belfast City Council, serving as High Sheriff of Belfast between 2000 and 2001.

== Background ==
Campbell was first elected onto Belfast City Council at the May 1985 local elections, representing the Castle District, for the Alliance Party. He was defeated at the 1993 election, losing out to the Social Democratic and Labour Party (SDLP), who won a second seat in the district. He returned to the council in 1997. In January 2000, Campbell was appointed High Sheriff of Belfast.He lost his seat again at the 2001 local elections.

At the 2005 local elections, Campbell was elected onto Newtownabbey Borough Council, representing the Antrim Line District. He moved districts at the 2011 election, being elected in the University area.

At the 2014 local elections, Campbell was elected onto the successor Antrim and Newtownabbey 'super council,' serving as Alliance's sole representative in the Three Mile Water District. He was joined on the council by running mate Julie Gilmour at the 2019 election. Both were re-elected in 2023.
