= 2019 Antrim and Newtownabbey Borough Council election =

2019 Northern Irish local government election

2019 Antrim and Newtownabbey Council election
- 2 May 2019

All 40 council seats 21 seats needed for a majority
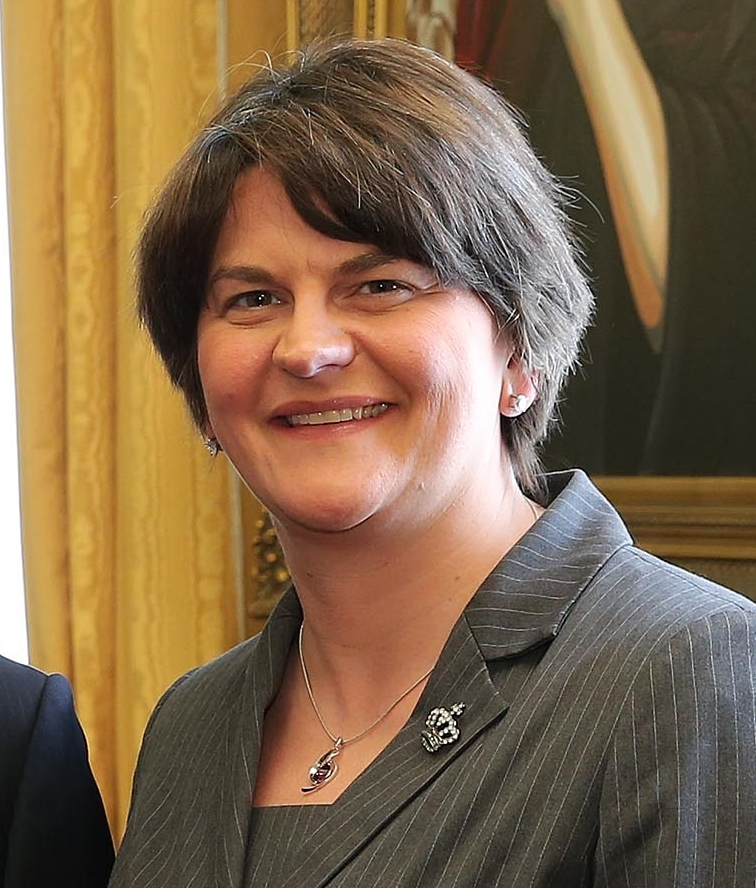

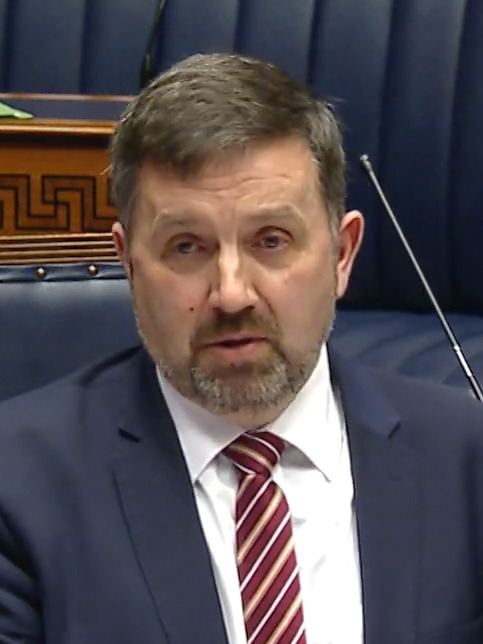

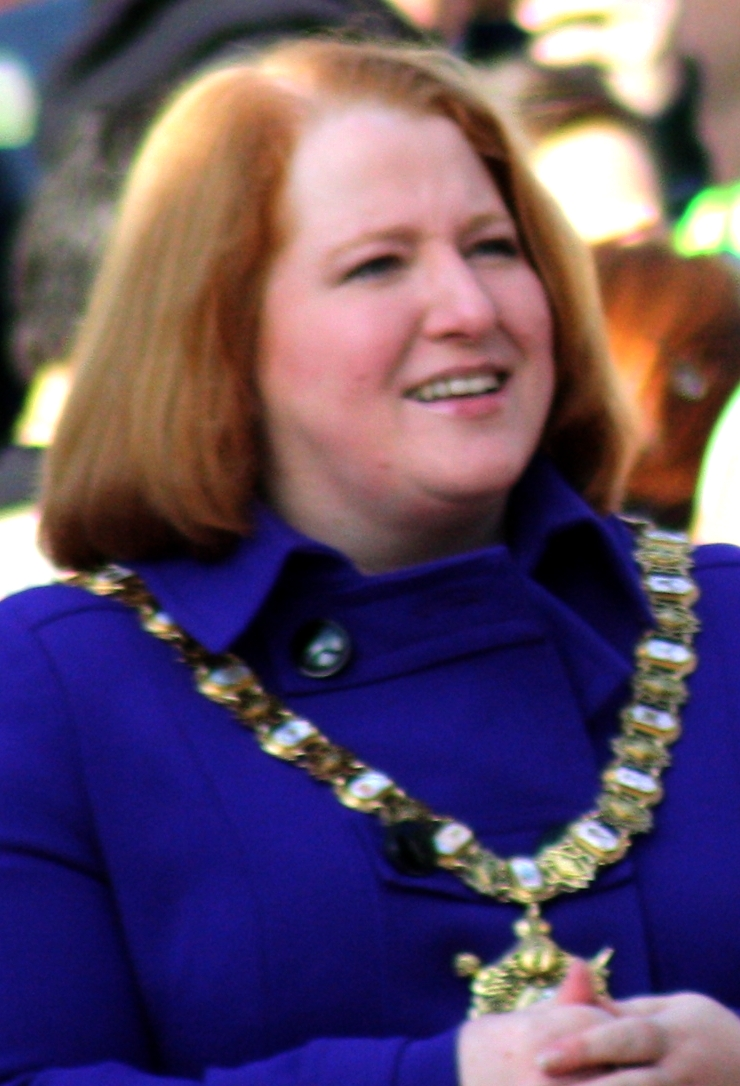

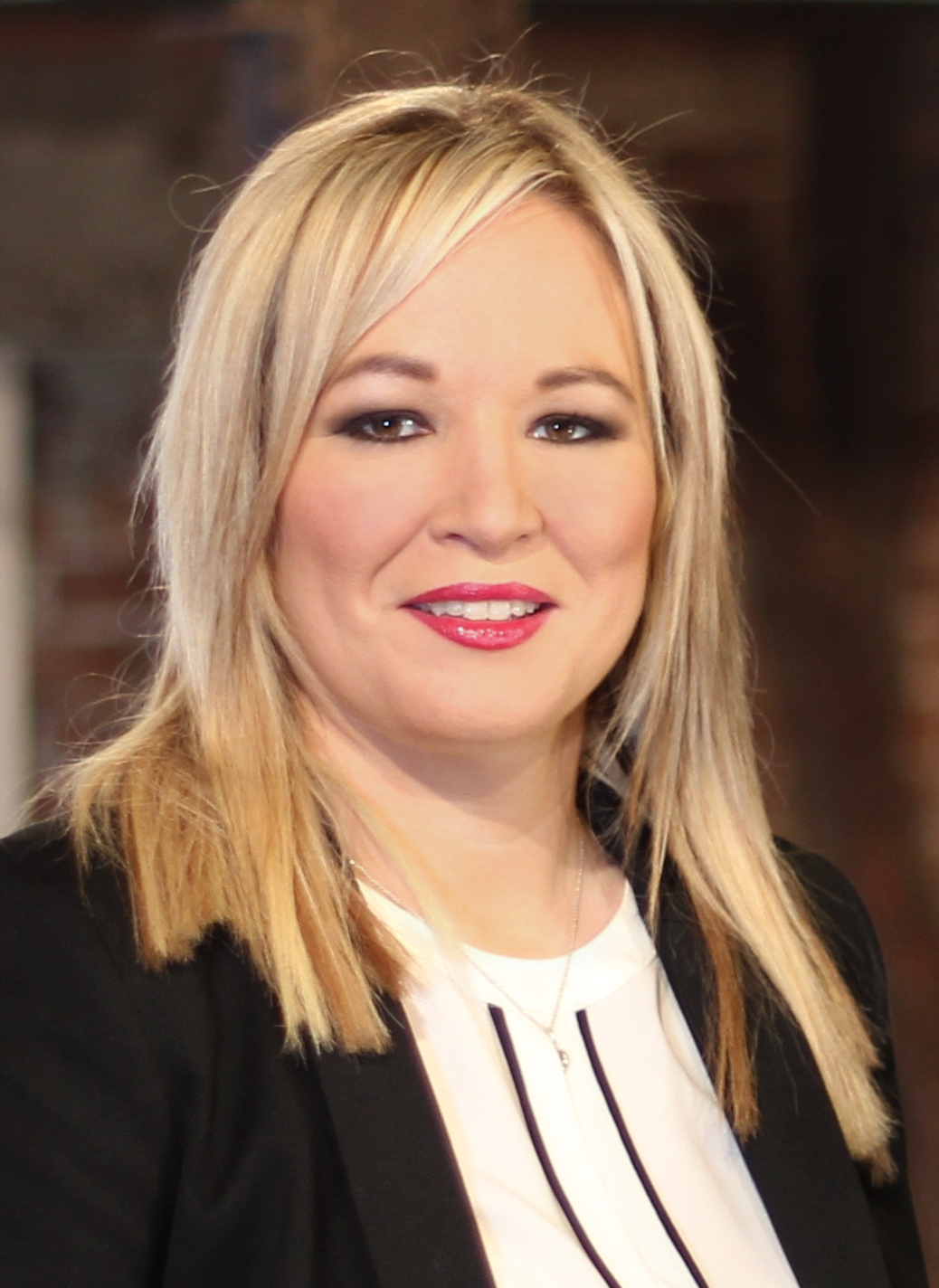

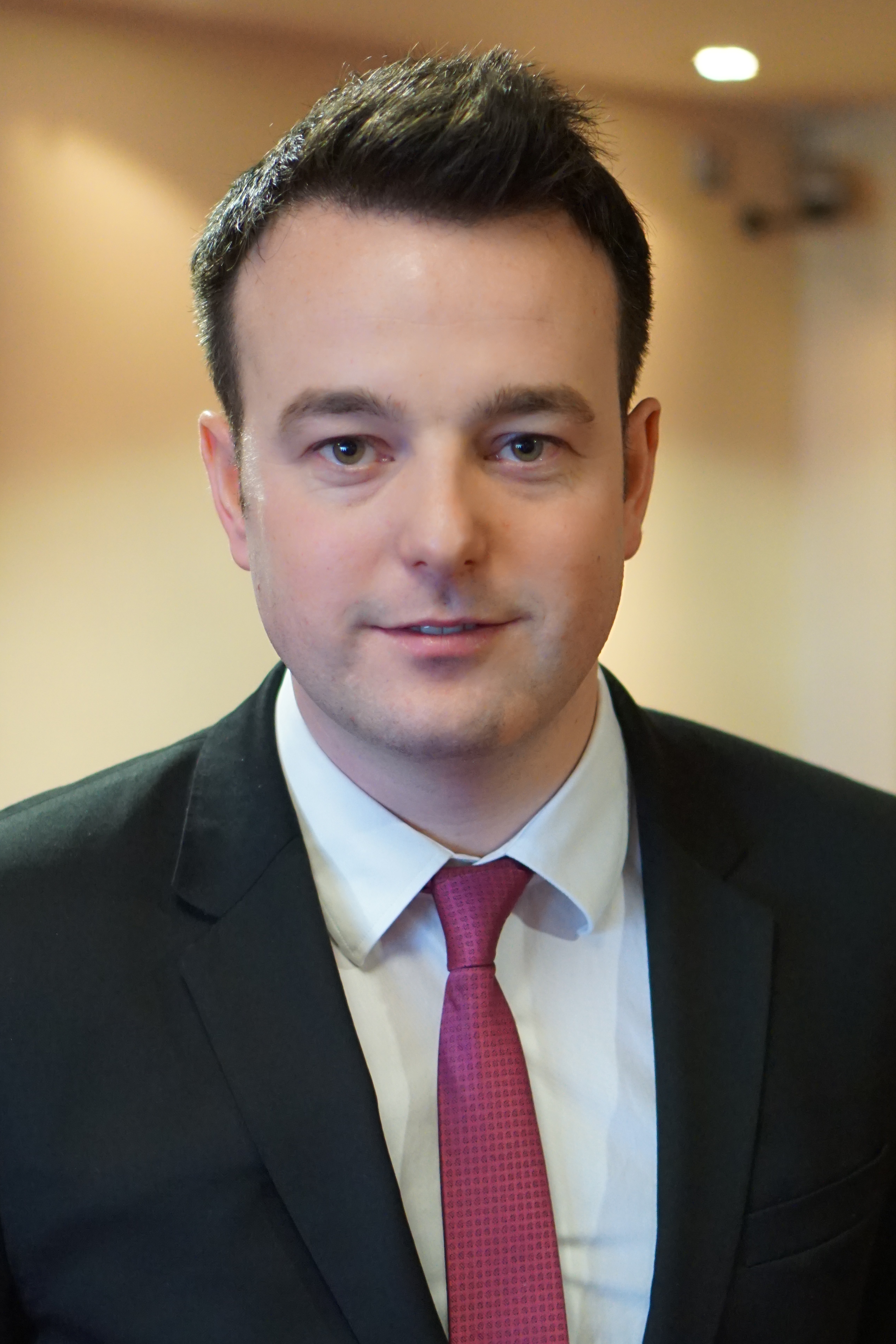

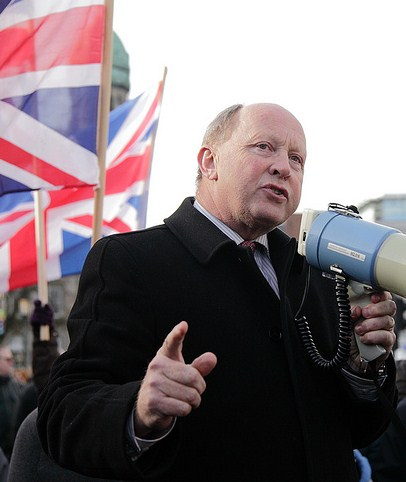
	First party	Second party	Third party
Leader	Arlene Foster	Robin Swann	Naomi Long
Party	DUP	UUP	Alliance
Seats won	14	9	7
Seat change	▼1	▼3	▲3
	Fourth party	Fifth party	Sixth party
Leader	Michelle O'Neill (Note: The leader of Sinn Féin is Mary Lou McDonald, who sits as a TD in the Irish Dáil Éireann for Dublin Central. O'Neill is the leader of the party in Northern Ireland.)	Colum Eastwood
Party	Sinn Féin	SDLP	Independent
Seats won	5	4	1
Seat change	▲2	0	▲1
	Seventh party
Leader	Jim Allister
Party	TUV
Seats won	0
Seat change	▼2
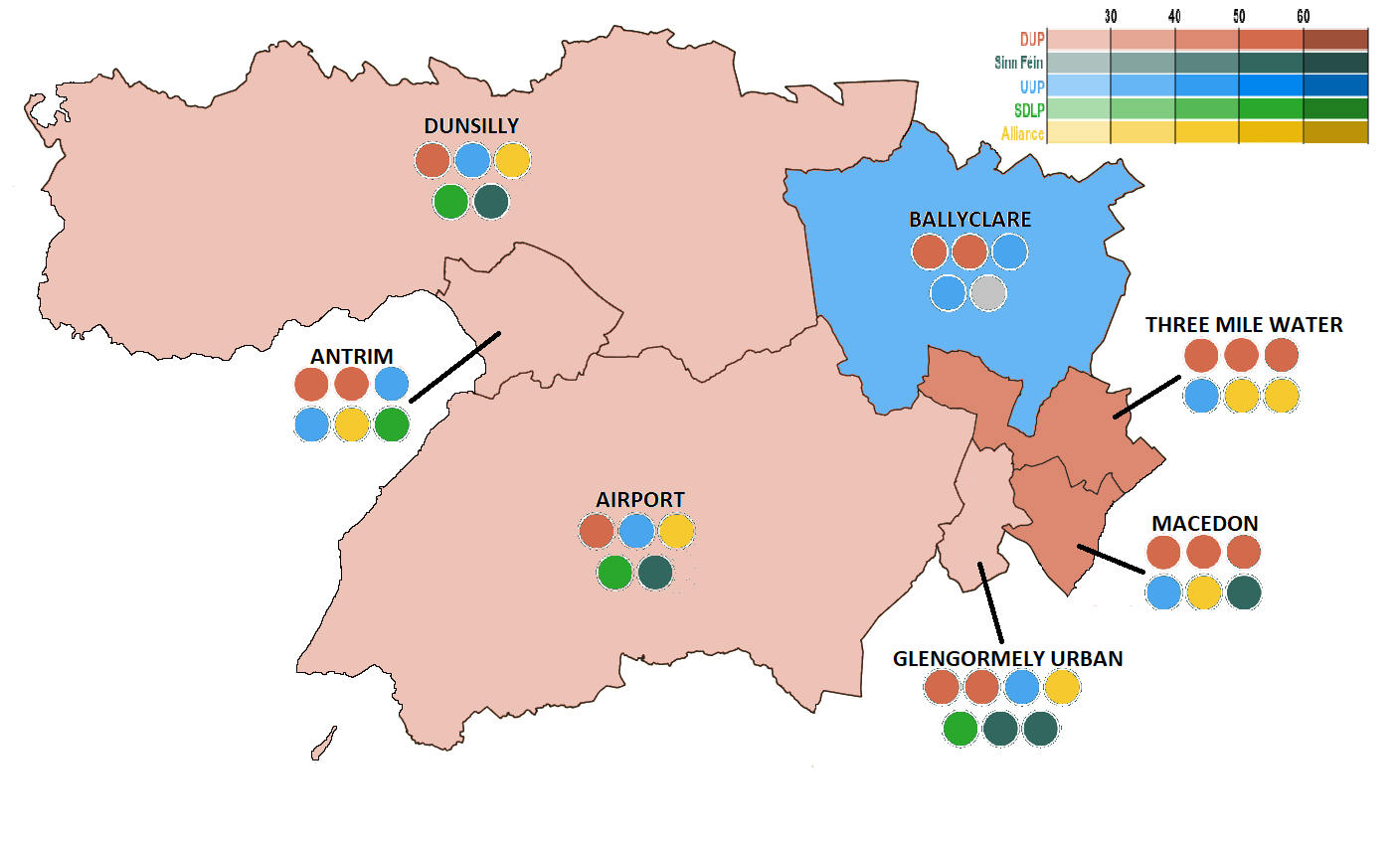
- Antrim and Newtownabbey 2019 Council Election Results by DEA (Shaded by the plurality of FPVs)

Elections to Antrim and Newtownabbey Borough Council, part of the Northern Ireland local elections on 2 May 2019, returned 40 members to the council using Single Transferable Vote. The Democratic Unionist Party were the largest party in both first-preference votes and seats.

== Election results ==
Antrim and Newtownabbey Borough Council Election Result 2019
Party	Seats	Gains	Losses	Net gain/loss	Seats %	Votes %	Votes	+/−
DUP	14	0	1	▼1	35.0	31.5	15,100	▼0.7
UUP	9	0	3	▼3	22.5	20.3	9,726	▼1.7
Alliance	7	3	0	▲3	17.5	18.7	8,970	▲6.0
Sinn Féin	5	2	0	▲2	12.5	13.1	6,269	▲0.7
SDLP	4	0	0	0	10.0	7.8	3,742	▼0.8
Independent	1	1	0	▲1	2.5	5.3	5,364	▲5.0
TUV	0	0	2	▼2	0.0	1.7	804	▼4.0
UKIP	0	0	0	0	0.0	1.0	473	▲1.0
Green (NI)	0	0	0	0	0.0	0.7	341	▲0.7

Note: "Votes" are the first preference votes.

The overall turnout was 49.07% with a total of 48,526 valid votes cast. A total of 537 ballots were rejected.

== Districts summary ==
Results of the Antrim and Newtownabbey Borough Council election, 2019 by district
Ward	%	Cllrs	%	Cllrs	%	Cllrs	%	Cllrs	%	Cllrs	%	Cllrs	Total Cllrs
Ward	DUP		UUP		Alliance		Sinn Féin		SDLP		Others		Total Cllrs
Airport	23.3	1	20.7	1	17.3	1	22.7	1	16.0	1	0.0	0	5
Antrim	26.4	2	16.0	2	26.3	1	9.1	0	11.2	1	11.0	0	6
Ballyclare	30.2	2	34.0	2	11.5	0	0.0	0	0.0	0	24.3	1	5
Dunsilly	28.7	1	17.4	1	15.2	1	24.8	1	13.8	1	0.0	0	5
Glengormley Urban	29.3	2	15.5	1	16.9	1	21.5	2	12.5	1	4.3	0	7
Macedon	43.0	3	15.3	1	18.0	1	12.2	1	0.0	0	11.6	0	6
Three Mile Water	40.1	3	22.9	1	25.9	2	0.0	0	0.0	0	11.0	0	6
Total	31.5	14	20.3	9	18.7	7	13.1	5	7.8	4	8.7	1	40

== District results ==
=== Airport ===
2014: 2 x UUP, 1 x Sinn Féin, 1 x SDLP, 1 x DUP
2019: 1 x UUP, 1 x Sinn Féin, 1 x SDLP, 1 x DUP, 1 x Alliance
2014-2019 Change: Alliance gain from UUP

Airport - 5 seats
Party	Candidate	FPv%	Count				
Party	Candidate	FPv%	1	2	3	4	5
Alliance	Vikki McAuley †	17.31%	1,221				
DUP	Matthew Magill*	16.51%	1,164	1,165.44	1,589.44		
UUP	Paul Michael*	12.66%	893	903.24	940.68	1,190.68	
Sinn Féin	Anne-Marie Logue*	15.53%	1,095	1,097.56	1,098.56	1,098.56	1,567.56
SDLP	Thomas Burns*	15.95%	1,125	1,148.68	1,152.8	1,166.8	1,197.8
UUP	Mervyn Rea*	8.06%	568	571.16	584.16	702.16	704.16
Sinn Féin	Cathy Rooney	7.16%	505	506.6	506.6	506.6	
DUP	Ben Mallon	6.82%	481	481.76			
Electorate: 14,042 Valid: 7,052 (50.22%) Spoilt: 69 Quota: 1,176 Turnout: 7,121 (50.71%)

=== Antrim ===
2014: 2 x DUP, 2 x UUP, 1 x Alliance, 1 x SDLP
2019: 2 x DUP, 2 x UUP, 1 x Alliance, 1 x SDLP
2014-2019 Change: No change

Antrim - 6 seats
Party	Candidate	FPv%	Count						
Party	Candidate	FPv%	1	2	3	4	5	6	7
Alliance	Neil Kelly*	26.26%	1,689						
SDLP	Roisin Lynch*	11.24%	723	1,111.11					
DUP	John Smyth*	11.41%	734	765.11	769.79	832.32	1,047.32		
DUP	Paul Dunlop	9.38%	603	620.34	622.14	704.69	806.77	921.45	
UUP	Leah Smyth	9.56%	615	721.08	752.04	802.07	838.17	844.27	971.27
UUP	Jim Montgomery	6.47%	416	477.2	503.48	557.05	578.68	581.73	824.65
Sinn Féin	Gerard Magee	9.06%	583	637.06	725.98	727.98	728.34	728.34	740.89
Independent	Adrian Cochrane-Watson	5.58%	359	421.73	449.09	527.29	538.82	541.26	
DUP	Karl McMeekin	5.64%	363	379.83	382.35	403.35			
TUV	Richard Cairns	5.40%	347	374.54	379.58				
Electorate: 15,051 Valid: 6,432 (42.73%) Spoilt: 80 Quota: 919 Turnout: 6,512 (43.27%)

=== Ballyclare ===
2014: 2 x UUP, 2 x DUP, 1 x TUV
2019: 2 x UUP, 2 x DUP, 1 x Independent
2014-2019 Change: Independent gain from TUV

Ballyclare - 5 seats
Party	Candidate	FPv%	Count					
Party	Candidate	FPv%	1	2	3	4	5	6
UUP	Danny Kinahan †	18.54%	1,253					
Independent	Michael Stewart	17.49%	1,182					
UUP	Vera McWilliam*	10.46%	707	790.4	1,073.2	1,084.95	1,109.3	1,233.3
DUP	Jeannie Archibald	10.93%	739	745.4	754.1	756.55	1,054.6	1,130.6
DUP	Mandy Girvan*	12.74%	861	865	876.1	880.65	1,006.8	1,091.8
Alliance	Gary English	11.47%	775	783.9	799.5	811.35	819.55	900.55
Independent	David Arthurs*	6.76%	457	462.9	473.7	496.2	503.75	
DUP	Austin Orr	6.56%	443	445.9	465.2	466.8		
UUP	Norman Ramsey	5.05%	341	352.8				
Electorate: 13,190 Valid: 6,758 (51.24%) Spoilt: 63 Quota: 1,127 Turnout: 6,821 (51.71%)

=== Dunsilly ===
2014: 2 x DUP, 1 x UUP, 1 x Sinn Féin, 1 x SDLP
2019: 1 x DUP, 1 x UUP, 1 x Sinn Féin, 1 x SDLP, 1 x Alliance
2014-2019 Change: Alliance gain from DUP

Dunsilly - 5 seats
Party	Candidate	FPv%	Count				
Party	Candidate	FPv%	1	2	3	4	5
Sinn Féin	Henry Cushinan*	16.33%	1,064	1,065	1,520		
SDLP	Ryan Wilson	13.85%	902	913	984	1,294	
Alliance	Glenn Finlay ‡†	15.18%	989	1,030	1,048	1,111	
UUP	Roderick Swann*	10.92%	711	1,038	1,040	1,040	1,065
DUP	Linda Clarke*	14.82%	965	980	980	980	986
DUP	Jordan Greer	13.92%	907	935	935	935	939
Sinn Féin	Andrew Maguire	8.47%	552	553			
UUP	Gareth Thomas	6.51%	424				
Electorate: 12,519 Valid: 6,514 (52.03%) Spoilt: 76 Quota: 1,086 Turnout: 6,590 (52.64%)

=== Glengormley Urban ===
2014: 2 x DUP, 2 x UUP, 1 x Sinn Féin, 1 x Alliance, 1 x SDLP
2019: 2 x DUP, 2 x Sinn Féin, 1 x UUP, 1 x Alliance, 1 x SDLP
2014-2019 Change: Sinn Féin gain from UUP

Glengormley Urban - 7 seats
Party	Candidate	FPv%	Count						
Party	Candidate	FPv%	1	2	3	4	5	6	7
Alliance	Julian McGrath*	16.94%	1,345						
DUP	Phillip Brett* †	13.84%	1,099						
SDLP	Noreen McClelland*	12.50%	992	1,127					
UUP	Mark Cosgrove*	11.22%	891	921.51	928.53	936.81	1,208.81		
DUP	Alison Bennington	10.78%	856	861.67	861.67	894.7	929.84	1,052.84	
Sinn Féin	Michael Goodman*	11.39%	904	914.8	925.06	925.24	928.51	929.51	932.69
Sinn Féin	Rosie Kinnear	10.09%	801	814.23	827.46	827.55	827.82	827.82	829
Green (NI)	Paul Veronica	4.30%	341	471.41	558.08	558.53	586.11	629.11	761
DUP	Samantha Burns	4.70%	373	374.35	374.35	429.34	440.32	475.32	
UUP	Michael Maguire*	4.24%	337	358.33	365.62	366.34			
Electorate: 15,810 Valid: 7,939 (50.22%) Spoilt: 107 Quota: 993 Turnout: 8,046 (50.89%)

=== Macedon ===
2014: 3 x DUP, 1 x Alliance, 1 X UUP, 1 x TUV
2019: 3 x DUP, 1 x Alliance, 1 x UUP, 1 x Sinn Féin
2014-2019 Change: Sinn Féin gain from TUV

Macedon - 6 seats
Party	Candidate	FPv%	Count						
Party	Candidate	FPv%	1	2	3	4	5	6	7
Alliance	Billy Webb*	18.01%	1,127						
DUP	Paul Hamill* †	16.67%	1,043						
DUP	Thomas William Hogg* †	15.96%	999						
UUP	Robert Foster*	15.28%	956						
DUP	Dean McCullough ††	5.13%	321	332.4	439.08	509.88	558.24	687.42	976.42
Sinn Féin	Taylor McGrann	12.22%	765	830.7	830.84	831.54	834.84	836.44	836.44
Independent	Stafford Ward	5.48%	343	452.8	458.96	463.26	499.72	545.22	560.22
DUP	Victor Robinson	5.23%	327	337.5	354.72	368.42	383.52	444.78	
TUV	David Hollis*	3.56%	223	238	244.58	248.48	297.56		
UKIP	Robert Hill	2.46%	154	168.1	173.56	176.56			
Electorate: 13,593 Valid: 6,258 (46.04%) Spoilt: 73 Quota: 895 Turnout: 6,331 (46.58%)

=== Three Mile Water ===
2014: 3 x DUP, 2 x UUP, 1 x Alliance
2019: 3 x DUP, 2 x Alliance, 1 x UUP
2014-2019 Change: Alliance gain from UUP

Three Mile Water - 6 seats
Party	Candidate	FPv%	Count						
Party	Candidate	FPv%	1	2	3	4	5	6	7
DUP	Mark Cooper*	17.48%	1,230						
DUP	Stephen Ross*	15.68%	1,103						
UUP	Fraser Agnew*	15.63%	1,100						
Alliance	Tom Campbell*	15.28%	1,075						
DUP	Sam Flanagan*	6.95%	489	679.62	761.43	770.79	771.27	777.13	996.13
Alliance	Julie Gilmour	10.64%	749	751.34	752.69	755.49	815.01	927.45	975.45
UUP	Stephen McCarthy*	7.31%	514	522.64	528.13	589.41	591.45	651.33	843.33
UKIP	Raymond Stewart	4.53%	319	324.76	328.27	331.55	331.73	347.97	
TUV	Norman Boyd	3.33%	234	240.84	243.81	251.73	252.03	258.7	
Independent	Gary Grattan	3.17%	223	224.8	225.79	227.07	228.57		
Electorate: 14,694 Valid: 7,036 (47.88%) Spoilt: 69 Quota: 1,006 Turnout: 7,105 (48.35%)

== Changes during the term ==
=== † Co-options ===
Date co-opted	Electoral Area	Party	Outgoing	Co-optee	Reason
31 October 2019	Macedon	DUP	Thomas Hogg	Victor Robinson	Hogg resigned.
4 May 2020	Macedon	DUP	Dean McCullough	Linda Irwin	McCullough was co-opted to Belfast City Council.
2 September 2020	Ballyclare	UUP	Danny Kinahan	Norman Ramsay	Kinahan resigned following his appointment as Northern Ireland’s Veterans Commissioner.
24 February 2021	Airport	Alliance	Vikki McAuley	Andrew McAuley	Vikki McAuley resigned.
18 October 2021	Macedon	DUP	Paul Hamill	Ben Mallon	Hamill died.
7 December 2021	Macedon	DUP	Linda Irwin	Matthew Brady	Irwin resigned.
31 May 2022	Glengormley Urban	DUP	Phillip Brett	Paula Bradley	Brett was elected to the Northern Ireland Assembly.
18 June 2022	Dunsilly	Alliance	Glenn Finlay (Ind.)	Jay Burbank	Finlay died.

=== ‡ Changes in affiliation ===
Date	Electoral Area	Name	Previous affiliation	New affiliation	Circumstance
3 December 2021	Dunsilly	Glenn Finlay	Alliance	Independent	Suspended from Alliance due to 'ongoing investigations'.
18 June 2022	Dunsilly	Vacant	Independent	Alliance	Finlay's seat returned to Alliance.

=== – Suspensions ===
None

Last updated 19 June 2022.

Current composition: see Antrim and Newtownabbey Borough Council
