= Glengormley Urban (District Electoral Area) =

District electoral area in Northern Ireland

- Antrim and Newtownabbey Borough Council DEA constituency

Current constituency
- Created: 2014
- Seats: 7 (2014-)
- Councillors: Alison Bennington (DUP); Paula Bradley (DUP); Mark Cosgrove (UUP); Michael Goodman (SF); Rosie Kinnear (SF); Julian McGrath (APNI); Eamonn McLaughlin (SF)

Glengormley Urban DEA within Antrim and Newtownabbey

Glengormley Urban is one of the seven district electoral areas (DEA) in Antrim and Newtownabbey, Northern Ireland. The district elects seven members to Antrim and Newtownabbey Borough Council and contains the wards of Ballyhenry, Burnthill, Carnmoney, Collinbridge, Glebe, Glengormley and Hightown. Glengormley Urban forms part of the Belfast North constituencies for the Northern Ireland Assembly and UK Parliament and part of the South Antrim constituencies for the Northern Ireland Assembly and UK Parliament.

It was created for the 2014 local elections, largely replacing the Antrim Line DEA which had existed since 1985.

== Councillors ==
Election	Councillor (Party)	Councillor (Party)	Councillor (Party)	Councillor (Party)	Councillor (Party)	Councillor (Party)	Councillor (Party)
2023	Julian McGrath (Alliance)	Eamonn McLaughlin (Sinn Féin)	Rosie Kinnear (Sinn Féin)	Michael Goodman (Sinn Féin)	Mark Cosgrove (UUP)	Paula Bradley (DUP)	Alison Bennington (DUP)
June 2022 Co-Option	Julian McGrath (Alliance)	Noreen McClelland (SDLP)	Rosie Kinnear (Sinn Féin)	Michael Goodman (Sinn Féin)	Mark Cosgrove (UUP)	Paula Bradley (DUP)	Alison Bennington (DUP)
2019	Julian McGrath (Alliance)	Noreen McClelland (SDLP)	Rosie Kinnear (Sinn Féin)	Michael Goodman (Sinn Féin)	Mark Cosgrove (UUP)	Phillip Brett (DUP)	Alison Bennington (DUP)
June 2018 Co-Option	Julian McGrath (Alliance)	Noreen McClelland (SDLP)	Michael Maguire (UUP)	Michael Goodman (Sinn Féin)	Mark Cosgrove (UUP)	Phillip Brett (DUP)	Audrey Ball (DUP)
2014	John Blair (Alliance)	Noreen McClelland (SDLP)	Michael Maguire (UUP)	Michael Goodman (Sinn Féin)	Mark Cosgrove (UUP)	Phillip Brett (DUP)	Audrey Ball (DUP)

== 2023 Election ==
2019: 2 x DUP, 2 x Sinn Féin, 1 x Alliance, 1 x UUP, 1 x SDLP

2023: 3 x Sinn Féin, 2 x DUP, 1 x Alliance, 1 x UUP

2019–2023 Change: Sinn Féin gain from SDLP

Glengormley Urban - 7 seats
Party	Candidate	FPv%	Count						
Party	Candidate	FPv%	1	2	3	4	5	6	7
DUP	Alison Bennington*	16.34%	1,432						
Sinn Féin	Eamonn McLaughlin	14.60%	1,280						
DUP	Paula Bradley*	9.72%	852	1,151.92					
Alliance	Julian McGrath*	11.34%	994	996.76	999.42	1,012.42	1,072.84	1,434.84	
UUP	Mark Cosgrove*	10.86%	952	969.25	969.39	1,041.69	1,069.92	1,104.92	
Sinn Féin	Rosie Kinnear*	11.09%	972	972.23	1,011.43	1,014.8	1,052.22	1,066.64	1,094.64
Sinn Féin	Michael Goodman*	9.59%	841	841.69	966.57	969.57	994.13	1,008.83	1,030.83
SDLP	Noreen McClelland*	6.45%	565	567.07	574.35	582.35	632.63	707.03	907.03
Alliance	Anita Piatek	4.71%	413	413.69	416.63	422.77	532		
Green (NI)	Lesley Veronica	3.57%	313	313.92	315.46	341.06			
Independent	Michael Maguire	1.16%	102	104.07	104.49				
NI Conservatives	Jason Reid	0.56%	49	50.15	50.15				
Electorate: 16,445 Valid: 8,765 (53.30%) Spoilt: 129 Quota: 1,096 Turnout: 8,894 (54.08%)

== 2019 Election ==
2014: 2 x DUP, 2 x UUP, 1 x Sinn Féin, 1 x Alliance, 1 x SDLP

2019: 2 x DUP, 2 x Sinn Féin, 1 x UUP, 1 x Alliance, 1 x SDLP

2014-2019 Change: Sinn Féin gain from UUP

Glengormley Urban - 7 seats
Party	Candidate	FPv%	Count						
Party	Candidate	FPv%	1	2	3	4	5	6	7
Alliance	Julian McGrath*	16.94%	1,345						
DUP	Phillip Brett* †	13.84%	1,099						
SDLP	Noreen McClelland*	12.50%	992	1,127					
UUP	Mark Cosgrove*	11.22%	891	921.51	928.53	936.81	1,208.81		
DUP	Alison Bennington	10.78%	856	861.67	861.67	894.7	929.84	1,052.84	
Sinn Féin	Michael Goodman*	11.39%	904	914.8	925.06	925.24	928.51	929.51	932.69
Sinn Féin	Rosie Kinnear	10.09%	801	814.23	827.46	827.55	827.82	827.82	829
Green (NI)	Paul Veronica	4.30%	341	471.41	558.08	558.53	586.11	629.11	761
DUP	Samantha Burns	4.70%	373	374.35	374.35	429.34	440.32	475.32	
UUP	Michael Maguire*	4.24%	337	358.33	365.62	366.34			
Electorate: 15,810 Valid: 7,939 (50.22%) Spoilt: 107 Quota: 993 Turnout: 8,046 (50.89%)

== 2014 Election ==
2014: 2 x DUP, 2 x UUP, 1 x Sinn Féin, 1 x Alliance, 1 x SDLP

Glengormley Urban - 7 seats
Party	Candidate	FPv%	Count						
Party	Candidate	FPv%	1	2	3	4	5	6	7
UUP	Mark Cosgrove*	16.06%	1,193						
DUP	Audrey Ball*	12.08%	897	919	933				
Alliance	John Blair* †	10.72%	796	804.14	865.02	1,119.02			
DUP	Phillip Brett	10.18%	756	783.28	793.16	803.38	811.38	1,266.38	
UUP	Michael Maguire	5.53%	411	592.06	634.16	650.48	678.48	718.28	1,030.28
SDLP	Noreen McClelland*	9.92%	737	738.32	769.32	820.76	927.76	928.98	930.98
Sinn Féin	Michael Goodman	11.54%	857	857.22	869.22	888.22	904.22	905.44	906.44
Sinn Féin	Gerry O'Reilly*	9.36%	695	695	706	718	729	729	729
DUP	Sam Flanagan	6.52%	484	496.76	511.76	514.76	522.76		
Alliance	Sam Nelson	4.66%	346	347.76	382.2				
NI21	Mary Higgins	3.43%	255	258.74					
Electorate: 15,506 Valid: 7,427 (47.90%) Spoilt: 119 Quota: 929 Turnout: 7,546 (48.67%)
