= Airport (District Electoral Area) =

District electoral area in Northern Ireland

- Antrim and Newtownabbey Borough Council DEA constituency

Current constituency
- Created: 2014
- Seats: 5 (2014-)
- Councillors: Anne-Marie Logue (SF); Matthew Magill (DUP); Andrew McAuley (APNI); Paul Michael (IND); Maighréad Ní Chonghaile (SF)

Airport DEA within Antrim and Newtownabbey

Airport is one of the seven district electoral areas (DEA) in Antrim and Newtownabbey, Northern Ireland. The district elects five members to Antrim and Newtownabbey Borough Council and contains the wards of Aldergrove, Clady, Crumlin, Mallusk and Templepatrick. Airport forms part of the South Antrim constituencies for the Northern Ireland Assembly and UK Parliament.

It was created for the 2014 local elections, largely replacing the Antrim South East DEA which had existed since 1985.

The district contains, and is named after, Belfast International Airport.

== Councillors ==
Election	Councillor (Party)	Councillor (Party)	Councillor (Party)	Councillor (Party)	Councillor (Party)
May 2024 Defection	Anne-Marie Logue (Sinn Féin)	Maighréad Ní Chonghaile (Sinn Féin)	Andrew McAuley (Alliance)	Paul Michael (Independent)/ (UUP)	Matthew Magill (DUP)
2023	Anne-Marie Logue (Sinn Féin)	Maighréad Ní Chonghaile (Sinn Féin)	Andrew McAuley (Alliance)	Paul Michael (Independent)/ (UUP)	Matthew Magill (DUP)
February 2021 Co-Option	Anne-Marie Logue (Sinn Féin)	Thomas Burns (SDLP)	Andrew McAuley (Alliance)	Paul Michael (Independent)/ (UUP)	Matthew Magill (DUP)
2019	Anne-Marie Logue (Sinn Féin)	Thomas Burns (SDLP)	Vikki McAuley (Alliance)	Paul Michael (Independent)/ (UUP)	Matthew Magill (DUP)
2014	Anne-Marie Logue (Sinn Féin)	Thomas Burns (SDLP)	Mervyn Rea (UUP)	Paul Michael (Independent)/ (UUP)	Matthew Magill (DUP)

== 2023 Election ==
2019: 1 x DUP, 1 x Sinn Féin, 1 x UUP, 1 x Alliance, 1 x SDLP

2023: 2 x Sinn Féin, 1 x DUP, 1 x UUP, 1 x Alliance

2019–2023 Change: Sinn Féin gain from SDLP

Airport - 5 seats
Party	Candidate	FPv%	Count			
Party	Candidate	FPv%	1	2	3	4
DUP	Matthew Magill*	22.79%	1,827			
Sinn Féin	Anne-Marie Logue*	19.64%	1,574			
Sinn Féin	Maighréad Ní Chonghaile	16.65%	1,335	1,355		
UUP	Paul Michael* ‡	13.41%	1,075	1,086	1,536.63	
Alliance	Andrew McAuley*	15.08%	1,209	1,281	1,295.58	1,342.02
SDLP	Thomas Burns*	10.75%	862	889	898.72	1,081.96
Green (NI)	Terri Johnston	1.67%	134			
Electorate: 15,479 Valid: 8,016 (51.79%) Spoilt: 55 Quota: 1,337 Turnout: 8,071 (52.14%)

== 2019 Election ==
2014: 2 x UUP, 1 x Sinn Féin, 1 x SDLP, 1 x DUP

2019: 1 x UUP, 1 x Sinn Féin, 1 x SDLP, 1 x DUP, 1 x Alliance

2014-2019 Change: Alliance gain from UUP

Airport - 5 seats
Party	Candidate	FPv%	Count				
Party	Candidate	FPv%	1	2	3	4	5
Alliance	Vikki McAuley †	17.31%	1,221				
DUP	Matthew Magill*	16.51%	1,164	1,165.44	1,589.44		
UUP	Paul Michael*	12.66%	893	903.24	940.68	1,190.68	
Sinn Féin	Anne-Marie Logue*	15.53%	1,095	1,097.56	1,098.56	1,098.56	1,567.56
SDLP	Thomas Burns*	15.95%	1,125	1,148.68	1,152.8	1,166.8	1,197.8
UUP	Mervyn Rea*	8.06%	568	571.16	584.16	702.16	704.16
Sinn Féin	Cathy Rooney	7.16%	505	506.6	506.6	506.6	
DUP	Ben Mallon	6.82%	481	481.76			
Electorate: 14,042 Valid: 7,052 (50.22%) Spoilt: 69 Quota: 1,176 Turnout: 7,121 (50.71%)

== 2014 Election ==
2014: 2 x UUP, 1 x DUP, 1 x SDLP, 1 x Sinn Féin

Airport - 5 seats
Party	Candidate	FPv%	Count				
Party	Candidate	FPv%	1	2	3	4	5
Sinn Féin	Anne-Marie Logue*	19.59%	1,212				
SDLP	Thomas Burns*	15.76%	975	1,089.95			
DUP	Matthew Magill	14.92%	923	923.38	963.57	1,365.57	
UUP	Paul Michael*	12.90%	798	798.19	843.57	899.57	1,088.57
UUP	Mervyn Rea*	11.73%	726	726.57	745.57	881.57	1,018.37
Alliance	Alan Lawther*	8.84%	547	562.58	791.34	801.34	806.74
DUP	Roy Thompson*	9.84%	609	609.19	618.19		
NI21	Heather Fee	4.46%	276	282.27			
SDLP	Oran Keenan*	1.96%	121	156.72			
Electorate: 12,801 Valid: 6,187 (48.33%) Spoilt: 52 Quota: 1,032 Turnout: 6,239 (48.74%)
