= Dunsilly (District Electoral Area) =

District electoral area in Northern Ireland

- Antrim and Newtownabbey Borough Council DEA constituency

Current constituency
- Created: 2014
- Seats: 5 (2014-)
- Councillors: Jay Burbank (APNI); Linda Clarke (DUP); Henry Cushinan (SF); Annie O'Loane (SF); Stewart Wilson (UUP)

Dunsilly DEA within Antrim and Newtownabbey

Dunsilly is one of the seven district electoral areas (DEA) in Antrim and Newtownabbey, Northern Ireland. The district elects five members to Antrim and Newtownabbey Borough Council and contains the wards of Cranfield, Parkgate, Randalstown, Shilvodan and Toome. Airport forms part of the South Antrim constituencies for the Northern Ireland Assembly and UK Parliament.

It was created for the 2014 local elections, largely replacing the Antrim North West DEA which had existed since 1985.

== Councillors ==
Election	Councillor (Party)	Councillor (Party)	Councillor (Party)	Councillor (Party)	Councillor (Party)
2023	Henry Cushinan (Sinn Féin)	Annie O'Loane (Sinn Féin)	Jay Burbank (Alliance)	Stewart Wilson (UUP)	Linda Clarke (DUP)
July 2022 Co-Option	Henry Cushinan (Sinn Féin)	Ryan Wilson (SDLP)	Jay Burbank (Alliance)	Roderick Swann (UUP)	Linda Clarke (DUP)
December 2021 Defection	Henry Cushinan (Sinn Féin)	Ryan Wilson (SDLP)	Glenn Finlay (Alliance)/ (Independent)	Roderick Swann (UUP)	Linda Clarke (DUP)
2019	Henry Cushinan (Sinn Féin)	Ryan Wilson (SDLP)	Glenn Finlay (Alliance)/ (Independent)	Roderick Swann (UUP)	Linda Clarke (DUP)
December 2018 Co-Option	Henry Cushinan (Sinn Féin)	Ryan Wilson (SDLP)	Jordan Greer (DUP)	Roderick Swann (UUP)	Linda Clarke (DUP)
February 2018 Defection	Henry Cushinan (Sinn Féin)	Brian Duffin (SDLP)/ (Independent)	Jordan Greer (DUP)	Roderick Swann (UUP)	Linda Clarke (DUP)
July 2017 Co-Option	Henry Cushinan (Sinn Féin)	Brian Duffin (SDLP)/ (Independent)	Trevor Beatty (DUP)	Roderick Swann (UUP)	Linda Clarke (DUP)
2014	Henry Cushinan (Sinn Féin)	Brian Duffin (SDLP)/ (Independent)	Trevor Beatty (DUP)	Roderick Swann (UUP)	Linda Clarke (DUP)

== 2023 Election ==
2019: 1 x DUP, 1 x Sinn Féin, 1 x UUP, 1 x Alliance, 1 x SDLP

2023: 2 x Sinn Féin, 1 x DUP, 1 x Alliance, 1 x UUP

2019–2023 Change: Sinn Féin gain from SDLP

Dunsilly - 5 seats
Party	Candidate	FPv%	Count							
Party	Candidate	FPv%	1	2	3	4	5	6	7	8
Sinn Féin	Henry Cushinan*	18.65%	1,390							
Sinn Féin	Annie O'Lone	16.29%	1,214	1,312						
DUP	Linda Clarke*	13.11%	977	986	1,153	1,153.13	1,153.13	1,773.13		
UUP	Stewart Wilson	11.31%	843	843	951	951.78	951.78	1,134.78	1,644.78	
Alliance	Jay Burbank*	12.25%	913	930	935	965.29	969.74	982.74	997.74	1,128.74
SDLP	Ryan Wilson*	9.71%	724	794	801	907.08	971.16	972.16	977.16	1,000.16
DUP	Tom Cunningham	9.46%	705	705	846	846.13	846.13			
TUV	Jonathan Campbell	5.97%	445	446						
Aontú	Siobhán McErlean	3.26%	243							
Electorate: 13,300 Valid: 7,454 (56.05%) Spoilt: 69 Quota: 1,243 Turnout: 7,523 (56.56%)

== 2019 Election ==
2014: 2 x DUP, 1 x UUP, 1 x Sinn Féin, 1 x SDLP

2019: 1 x DUP, 1 x UUP, 1 x Sinn Féin, 1 x SDLP, 1 x Alliance

2014-2019 Change: Alliance gain from DUP

Dunsilly - 5 seats
Party	Candidate	FPv%	Count				
Party	Candidate	FPv%	1	2	3	4	5
Sinn Féin	Henry Cushinan*	16.33%	1,064	1,065	1,520		
SDLP	Ryan Wilson	13.85%	902	913	984	1,294	
Alliance	Glenn Finlay ‡†	15.18%	989	1,030	1,048	1,111	
UUP	Roderick Swann*	10.92%	711	1,038	1,040	1,040	1,065
DUP	Linda Clarke*	14.82%	965	980	980	980	986
DUP	Jordan Greer	13.92%	907	935	935	935	939
Sinn Féin	Andrew Maguire	8.47%	552	553			
UUP	Gareth Thomas	6.51%	424				
Electorate: 12,519 Valid: 6,514 (52.03%) Spoilt: 76 Quota: 1,086 Turnout: 6,590 (52.64%)

== 2014 Election ==
2014: 2 x DUP, 1 x Sinn Féin, 1 x UUP, 1 x SDLP

Dunsilly - 5 seats
Party	Candidate	FPv%	Count				
Party	Candidate	FPv%	1	2	3	4	5
UUP	Roderick Swann*	18.56%	1,111				
SDLP	Brian Duffin* ‡†	11.31%	677	679.53	1,006.53		
DUP	Linda Clarke*	14.90%	892	935.12	938.56	1,029.56	
DUP	Trevor Beatty †	14.80%	886	935.06	936.72	1,020.72	
Sinn Féin	Henry Cushnihan*	12.99%	778	778	801	840.77	849.77
Sinn Féin	Anthony Brady*	11.73%	702	702.11	748.11	796.99	803.99
Alliance	Julian McGrath	8.19%	490	504.52	547.29		
SDLP	Ryan Wilson	7.52%	450	452.64			
Electorate: 11,922 Valid: 5,986 (50.21%) Spoilt: 71 Quota: 998 Turnout: 6,057 (50.81%)
