= Phillip Brett =

Northern Irish politician (born c. 1991)

Phillip Brett MLA
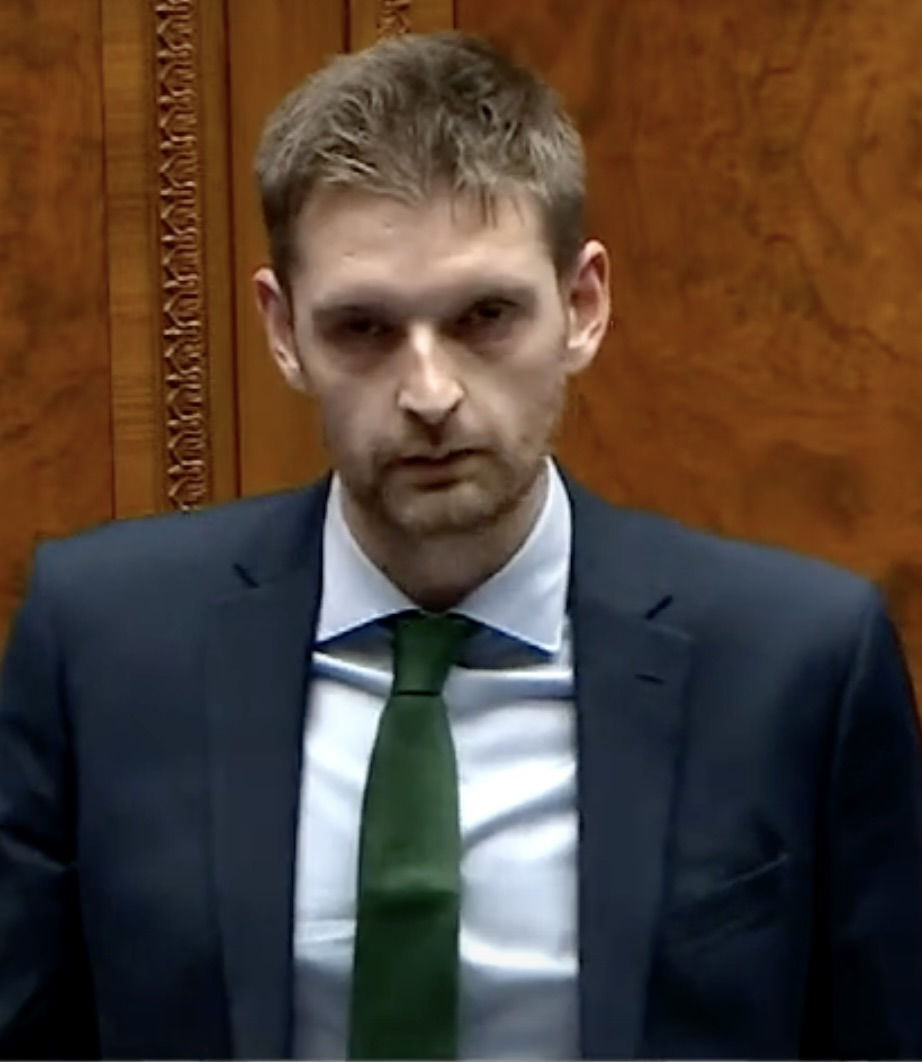
- Brett in 2024

Member of the Northern Ireland Assembly for Belfast North
- Incumbent
- Assumed office 5 May 2022
- Preceded by: Paula Bradley

Member of Antrim and Newtownabbey Borough Council
- In office 22 May 2014 – 5 May 2022
- Preceded by: Council created
- Succeeded by: Paula Bradley
- Constituency: Glengormley Urban

Personal details
- Born: 1991 (age 34–35) Belfast, Northern Ireland
- Party: Democratic Unionist Party

Phillip Brett (born 1991) is a Democratic Unionist Party (DUP) politician, serving as a Member of the Legislative Assembly (MLA) for Belfast North since 2022. Brett is the Economy spokesperson for the DUP and Chairs the Committee for the Economy at the Northern Ireland Assembly

== Background ==
Brett is the youngest child of Michael Brett, who was a paramedic and a Catholic, and his wife, Phyllis, who is Protestant. He has two siblings, a sister, Tara, and a brother, Gavin. His brother was killed by the Red Hand Defenders on 29 July 2001, aged 18. Brett's father died from liver cancer on 27 June 2007, aged 51.

== Political career ==
=== Local government ===
Brett was first elected to Antrim and Newtownabbey Borough Council in 2014, representing Glengormley Urban. He was re-elected in 2019.

=== Northern Ireland Assembly ===
At the 2022 Northern Ireland Assembly election, Brett was elected to represent Belfast North as one of two DUP MLAs.

==== 2024 General election ====
In May 2024, Brett announced his candidacy for Belfast North at the 2024 general election, saying in a statement: “I am absolutely delighted to have been selected to contest the General Election in North Belfast. "Together we can continue to build back North Belfast. Together we can elect an MP who will deliver the full-time representation North Belfast deserves." He polled 12,062 votes (29.8%), coming second against the incumbent MP, Sinn Féin's John Finucane.
