= 2014 Antrim and Newtownabbey Borough Council election =

2014 Northern Irish local government election

- 22 May 2014

All 40 council seats 21 seats needed for a majority
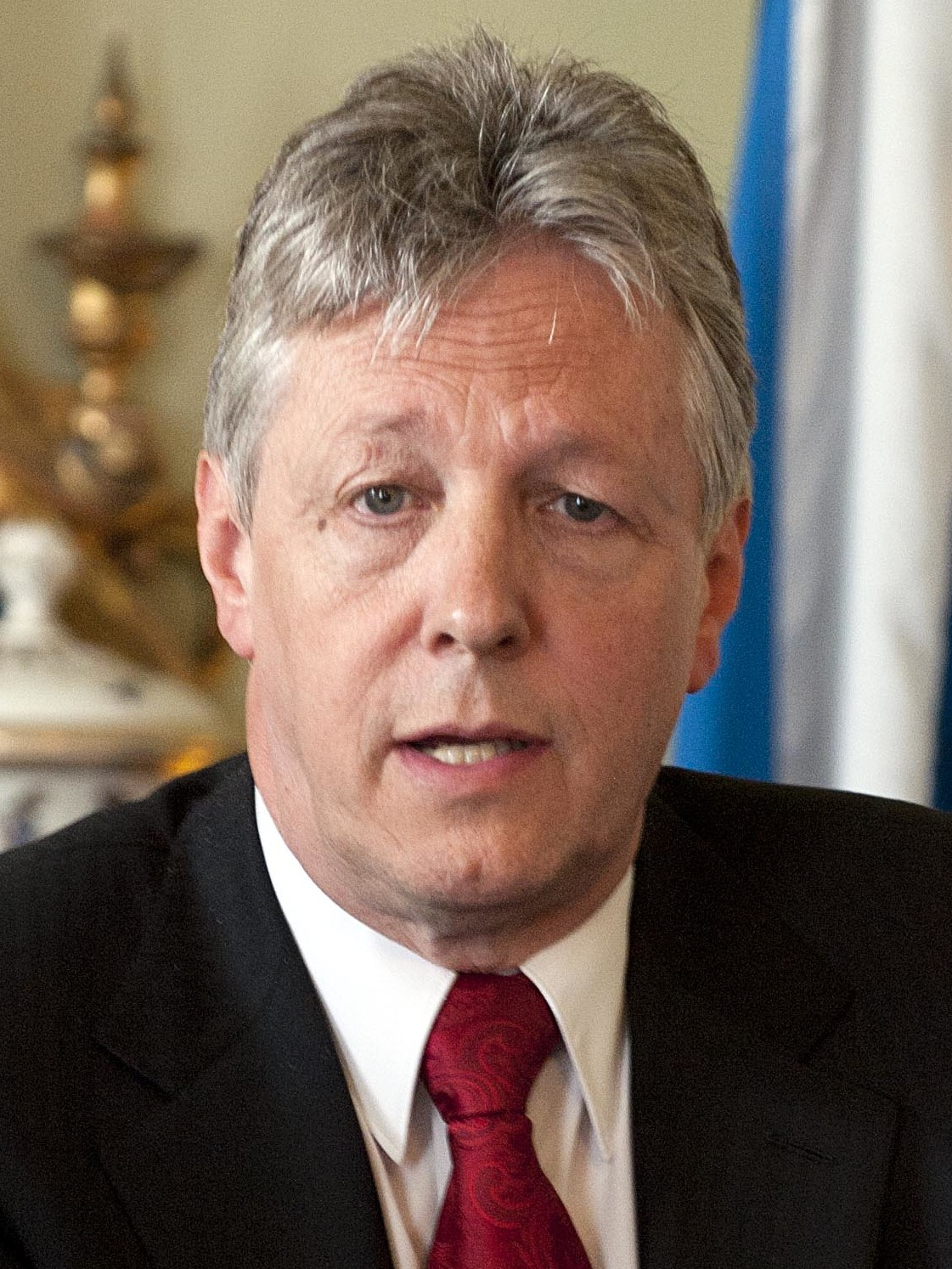

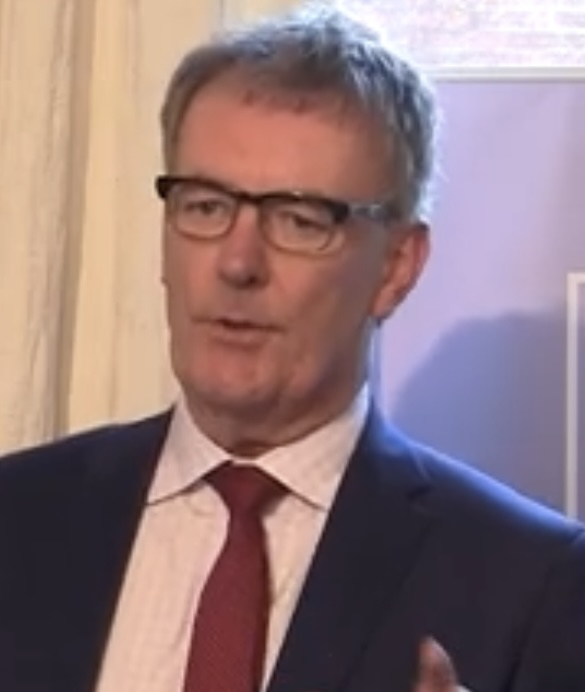

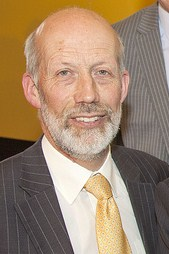

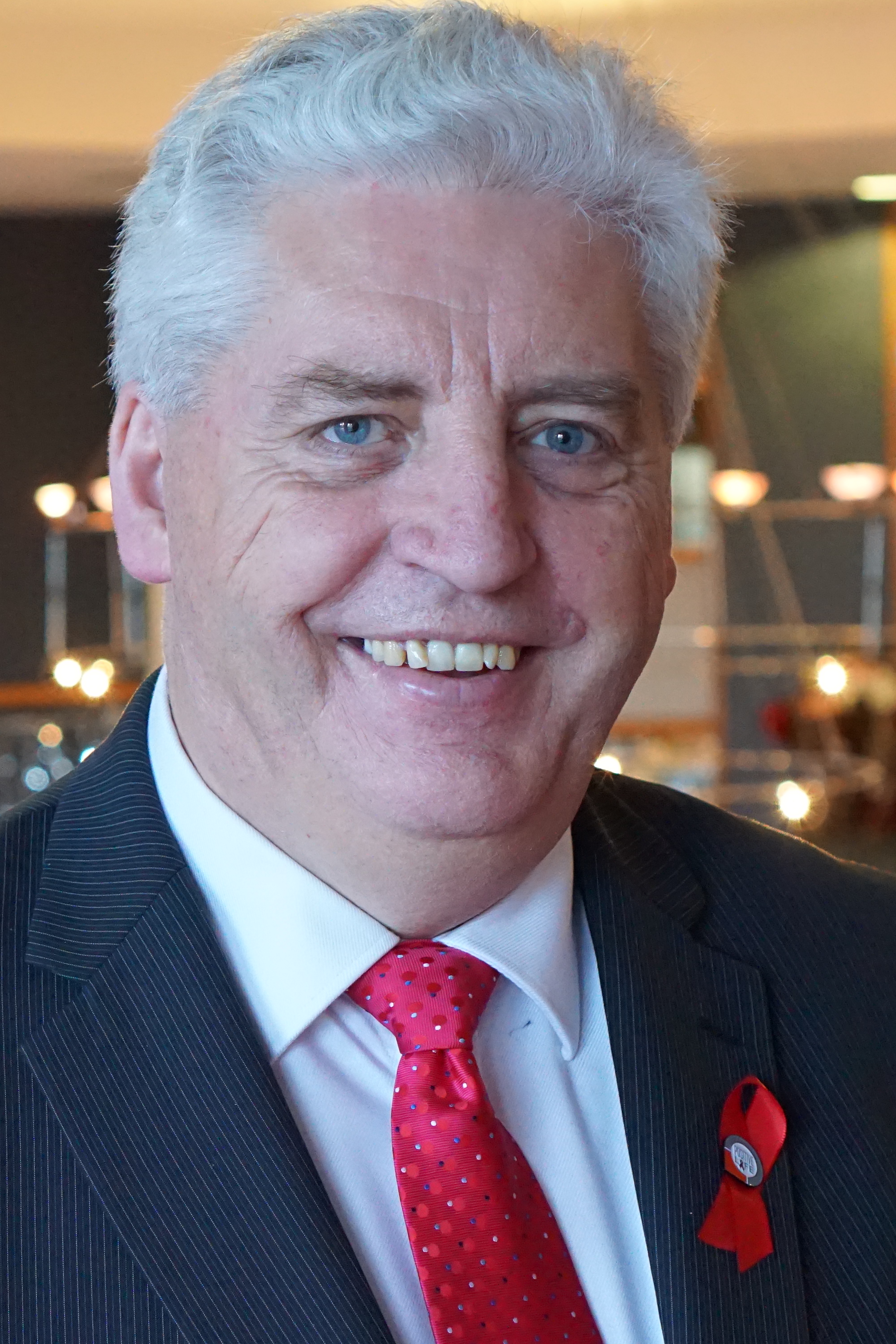

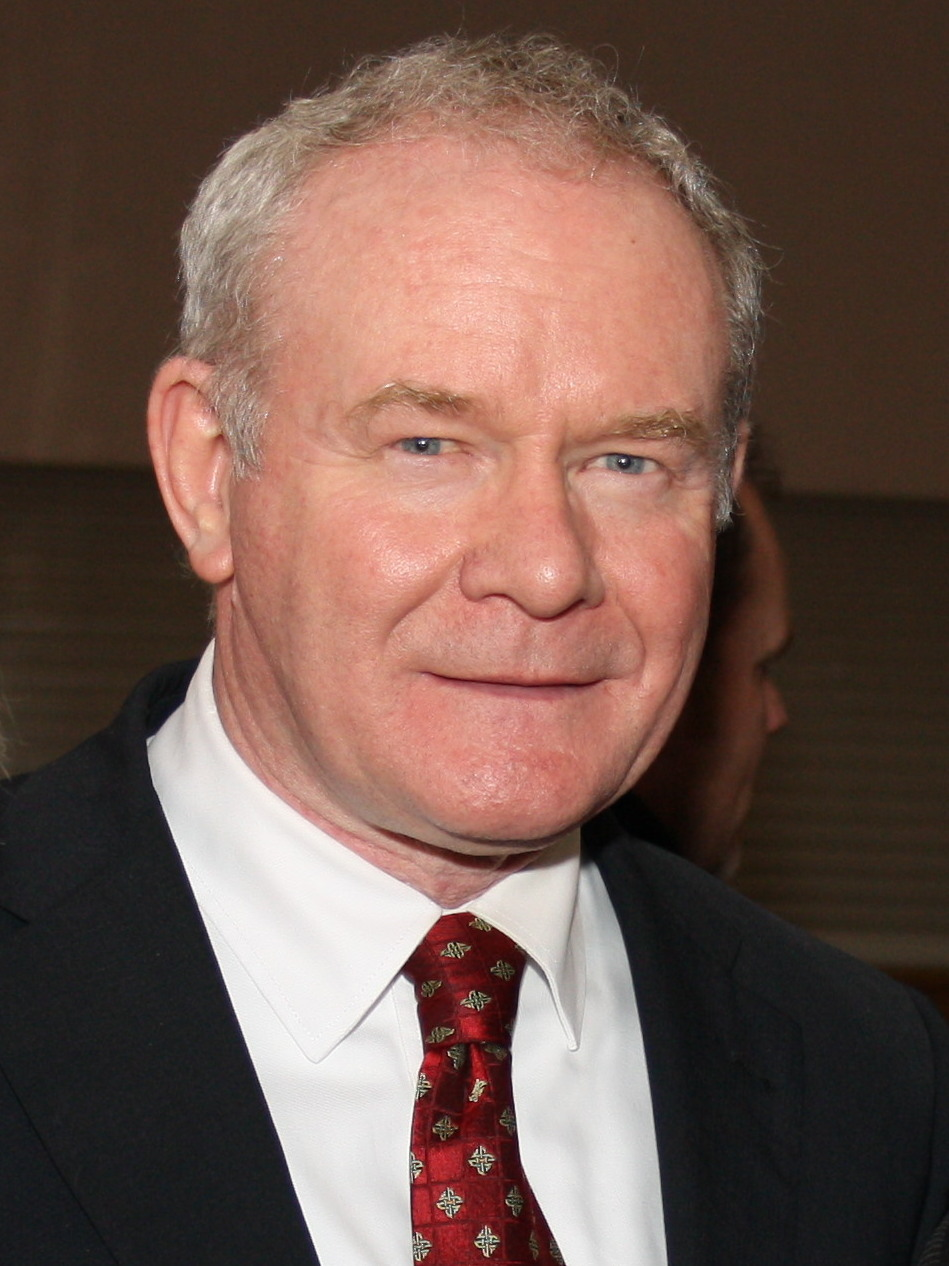

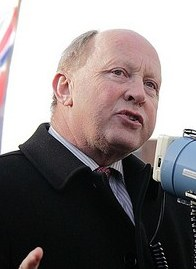
	First party	Second party	Third party
Leader	Peter Robinson	Mike Nesbitt	David Ford
Party	DUP	UUP	Alliance
Seats won	15	12	4
Seat change	New council	New council	New council
	Fourth party	Fifth party	Sixth party
Leader	Alasdair McDonnell	Martin McGuinness	Jim Allister
Party	SDLP	Sinn Féin	TUV
Seats won	4	3	2
Seat change	New council	New council	New council
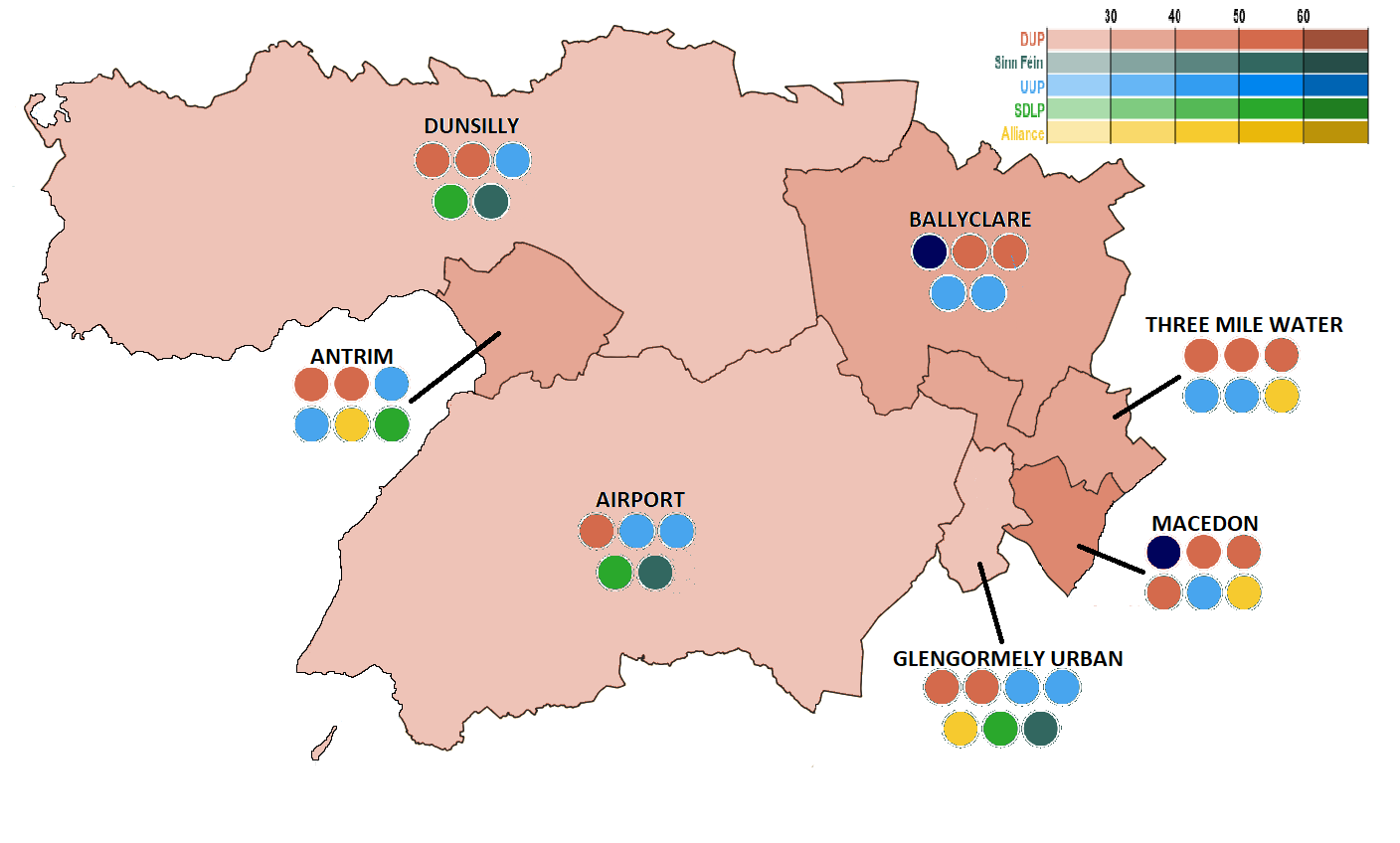
- English: Antrim and Newtownabbey 2014 Council Election Results by DEA (Shaded by plurality of FPVs)

The first election to Antrim and Newtownabbey Borough Council, part of the Northern Ireland local elections on 22 May 2014, returned 40 members to the newly formed council via Single Transferable Vote. The Democratic Unionist Party won a plurality of votes and seats.

== Election results ==
Party	Seats	First Pref. votes	FPv%
DUP	15	14,082	32.23
UUP	12	9,630	22.04
Alliance	4	5,533	12.66
SDLP	4	3,746	8.57
Sinn Féin	3	5,434	12.44
TUV	2	2,479	5.67
NI21	0	1,356	3.10
PUP	0	1,285	2.94
Independent	0	143	0.33
Totals	40	43,689	100.00

== Districts summary ==
Results of the Antrim and Newtownabbey Borough Council election, 2014 by district
Ward	%	Cllrs	%	Cllrs	%	Cllrs	%	Cllrs	%	Cllrs	%	Cllrs	%	Cllrs	Total Cllrs
Ward	DUP		UUP		Alliance		SDLP		Sinn Féin		TUV		Others		Total Cllrs
Airport	24.8	1	24.6	2	8.8	0	17.7	1	19.6	1	0.0	0	4.5	0	5
Antrim	30.9	2	22.9	2	13.5	1	10.2	1	10.6	0	9.4	0	2.5	0	6
Ballyclare	35.8	2	29.1	2	9.9	0	0.0	0	0.0	0	13.4	1	11.8	0	5
Dunsilly	29.7	2	18.6	1	8.2	0	18.8	1	24.7	1	0.0	0	0.0	0	5
Glengormley Urban	28.8	2	21.6	2	15.4	1	9.9	1	20.9	1	0.0	0	3.4	0	7
Macedon	45.2	3	9.1	1	14.0	1	3.0	0	9.4	0	10.9	1	8.4	0	6
Three Mile Water	32.0	3	28.2	2	17.7	1	0.0	0	0.0	0	7.9	0	14.2	0	6
Total	32.2	15	22.0	12	12.7	4	8.6	4	12.4	3	5.7	2	6.4	0	40

== District results ==
=== Airport ===
2014: 2 x UUP, 1 x DUP, 1 x SDLP, 1 x Sinn Féin

Airport - 5 seats
Party	Candidate	FPv%	Count				
Party	Candidate	FPv%	1	2	3	4	5
Sinn Féin	Anne-Marie Logue*	19.59%	1,212				
SDLP	Thomas Burns*	15.76%	975	1,089.95			
DUP	Matthew Magill	14.92%	923	923.38	963.57	1,365.57	
UUP	Paul Michael*	12.90%	798	798.19	843.57	899.57	1,088.57
UUP	Mervyn Rea*	11.73%	726	726.57	745.57	881.57	1,018.37
Alliance	Alan Lawther*	8.84%	547	562.58	791.34	801.34	806.74
DUP	Roy Thompson*	9.84%	609	609.19	618.19		
NI21	Heather Fee	4.46%	276	282.27			
SDLP	Oran Keenan*	1.96%	121	156.72			
Electorate: 12,801 Valid: 6,187 (48.33%) Spoilt: 52 Quota: 1,032 Turnout: 6,239 (48.74%)

=== Antrim ===
2014: 2 x DUP, 2 x UUP, 1 x Alliance, 1 x SDLP

Antrim - 6 seats
Party	Candidate	FPv%	Count					
Party	Candidate	FPv%	1	2	3	4	5	6
DUP	Nigel Kells †	11.15%	662	667	1,026			
UUP	Adrian Cochrane-Watson* †	13.22%	785	801	844	858.21		
DUP	John Smyth*	10.62%	631	636	724	856.79		
UUP	Drew Ritchie*	9.63%	572	595	614	626.25	1,009.25	
Alliance	Neil Kelly*	10.44%	620	813	825	830.39	876.39	
SDLP	Roisin Lynch	10.24%	608	636	637	638.47	648.94	690.94
Sinn Féin	Noel Maguire*	10.64%	632	643	644	644	646.98	646.98
TUV	Richard Cairns	9.43%	560	574	591	598.84		
DUP	Brian Graham*	9.09%	540	545				
Alliance	Sian O'Neill	3.06%	182					
NI21	George Young	2.42%	144					
Electorate: 14,408 Valid: 5,939 (41.22%) Spoilt: 101 Quota: 849 Turnout: 6,040 (41.92%)

=== Ballyclare ===
2014: 2 x DUP, 2 x UUP, 1 x TUV

Ballyclare - 5 seats
Party	Candidate	FPv%	Count				
Party	Candidate	FPv%	1	2	3	4	5
DUP	Mandy Girvan*	16.57%	930	938			
UUP	James Bingham*	14.59%	819	831	886	936	
DUP	Tim Girvan*	10.40%	584	589	621	654	1,057
UUP	Vera McWilliam	14.52%	815	828	856	895	938
TUV	David Arthurs ‡‡	13.36%	750	766	834	853	900
Alliance	Pat McCudden*	9.85%	553	581	585	720	730
DUP	Jordan Greer	8.78%	493	500	515	526	
NI21	Gary English	5.56%	312	343	348		
PUP	Scott McDowell	3.81%	214	220			
Independent	David McMaster	1.85%	104				
Independent	Robert Moore	0.69%	39				
Electorate: 12,408 Valid: 5,613 (45.24%) Spoilt: 71 Quota: 936 Turnout: 5,684 (45.81%)

=== Dunsilly ===
2014: 2 x DUP, 1 x Sinn Féin, 1 x UUP, 1 x SDLP

Dunsilly - 5 seats
Party	Candidate	FPv%	Count				
Party	Candidate	FPv%	1	2	3	4	5
UUP	Roderick Swann*	18.56%	1,111				
SDLP	Brian Duffin* ‡†	11.31%	677	679.53	1,006.53		
DUP	Linda Clarke*	14.90%	892	935.12	938.56	1,029.56	
DUP	Trevor Beatty †	14.80%	886	935.06	936.72	1,020.72	
Sinn Féin	Henry Cushnihan*	12.99%	778	778	801	840.77	849.77
Sinn Féin	Anthony Brady*	11.73%	702	702.11	748.11	796.99	803.99
Alliance	Julian McGrath	8.19%	490	504.52	547.29		
SDLP	Ryan Wilson	7.52%	450	452.64			
Electorate: 11,922 Valid: 5,986 (50.21%) Spoilt: 71 Quota: 998 Turnout: 6,057 (50.81%)

=== Glengormley Urban ===
2014: 2 x DUP, 2 x UUP, 1 x Sinn Féin, 1 x Alliance, 1 x SDLP

Glengormley Urban - 7 seats
Party	Candidate	FPv%	Count						
Party	Candidate	FPv%	1	2	3	4	5	6	7
UUP	Mark Cosgrove*	16.06%	1,193						
DUP	Audrey Ball*	12.08%	897	919	933				
Alliance	John Blair* †	10.72%	796	804.14	865.02	1,119.02			
DUP	Phillip Brett	10.18%	756	783.28	793.16	803.38	811.38	1,266.38	
UUP	Michael Maguire	5.53%	411	592.06	634.16	650.48	678.48	718.28	1,030.28
SDLP	Noreen McClelland*	9.92%	737	738.32	769.32	820.76	927.76	928.98	930.98
Sinn Féin	Michael Goodman	11.54%	857	857.22	869.22	888.22	904.22	905.44	906.44
Sinn Féin	Gerry O'Reilly*	9.36%	695	695	706	718	729	729	729
DUP	Sam Flanagan	6.52%	484	496.76	511.76	514.76	522.76		
Alliance	Sam Nelson	4.66%	346	347.76	382.2				
NI21	Mary Higgins	3.43%	255	258.74					
Electorate: 15,506 Valid: 7,427 (47.90%) Spoilt: 119 Quota: 929 Turnout: 7,546 (48.67%)

=== Macedon ===
2014: 3 x DUP, 1 x Alliance, 1 x TUV, 1 x UUP

Macedon - 6 seats
Party	Candidate	FPv%	Count						
Party	Candidate	FPv%	1	2	3	4	5	6	7
Alliance	Billy Webb*	13.99%	830	946					
DUP	Billy De Courcy*	14.23%	844	885					
DUP	Thomas Hogg*	9.80%	581	609	610	613.88	648.88	918.88	
DUP	Paul Hamill	9.07%	538	579	581	603.31	693.31	907.31	
TUV	David Hollis	10.88%	645	661	664	665.94	821.94	852.94	
UUP	John Scott* ‡‡†	9.07%	538	559	565	568.88	701.88	752.79	808.79
Sinn Féin	Brónach Anglin	9.41%	558	599	642	642	643	647	648
DUP	Victor Robinson	7.79%	462	550	555	559.85	632.85		
PUP	Ken Wilkinson	8.48%	503	517	519	519			
DUP	Dineen Walker*	4.32%	256						
SDLP	Dominic Mullaghan	3.00%	178						
Electorate: 13,198 Valid: 5,931 (44.94%) Spoilt: 108 Quota: 848 Turnout: 6,039 (45.69%)

=== Three Mile Water ===
2014: 3 x DUP, 2 x UUP, 1 x Alliance

Three Mile Water - 6 seats
Party	Candidate	FPv%	Count								
Party	Candidate	FPv%	1	2	3	4	5	6	7	8	9
UUP	Fraser Agnew*	19.30%	1,275								
DUP	William Ball* †	11.17%	738	801.44	813.74	1,001.74					
Alliance	Tom Campbell*	11.28%	745	753.84	756.84	756.84	756.84	855.36	1,231.36		
UUP	Ben Kelso †	8.89%	587	756	763.04	773.6	773.9	849.5	881.18	970.18	
DUP	Pamela Barr*	7.96%	526	543.68	546.94	585.32	638.12	657.64	676.68	697.68	815.98
DUP	Stephen Ross	8.43%	557	572.08	589.6	638.2	640.3	655.82	661.6	671.6	772.42
TUV	Trevor Mawhinney	7.93%	524	540.38	549.16	555.46	556.36	577.62	584.14	601.14	740.7
PUP	Darren Logan	5.19%	343	348.2	518.98	521.5	521.5	533.5	536.02	546.02	
Alliance	Lynn Frazer*	6.42%	424	433.36	433.62	433.62	433.62	514.88			
NI21	Gary Grattan	5.59%	369	373.94	376.94	378.94	378.94				
DUP	Robert Hill*	4.44%	293	303.66	305.66						
PUP	Jackie Shaw	3.41%	225	230.46							
Electorate: 13,982 Valid: 6,606 (47.25%) Spoilt: 92 Quota: 944 Turnout: 6,698 (47.90%)

* Incumbent

== Changes during the term ==
=== † Co-options ===
Co-option date	Electoral Area	Party	Outgoing	Co-optee	Reason
21 Jul 2015	Antrim	UUP	Adrian Cochrane-Watson	Jim Montgomery	Cochrane-Watson was co-opted to the Northern Ireland Assembly.
22 Jul 2017	Dunsilly	DUP	Trevor Beatty	Jordan Greer	Beatty resigned.
11 Oct 2017	Threemilewater	UUP	Ben Kelso	Stephen McCarthy	Kelso resigned.
1 Feb 2018	Macedon	UUP	John Scott (DUP)	Robert Foster	Scott (elected as UUP) resigned.
2 Jul 2018	Glengormley Urban	Alliance	John Blair	Julian McGrath	Blair was co-opted to the Northern Ireland Assembly.
1 Aug 2018	Three Mile Water	DUP	William Ball	Samuel Flanagan	Ball retired.
1 Oct 2018	Antrim	DUP	Nigel Kells	Paul Dunlop	Kells resigned.
20 Dec 2018	Dunsilly	SDLP	Brian Duffin (Ind.)	Ryan Wilson	Duffin (elected SDLP) resigned.

=== ‡ Changes in affiliation ===
Date	Electoral Area	Name	Previous affiliation	New affiliation	Circumstance
6 Nov 2015	Ballyclare	David Arthurs	TUV	Independent	Resigned.
9 Nov 2015	Ballyclare	David Arthurs	Independent	UUP	Affiliated.
29 Aug 2017	Macedon	John Scott	UUP	Independent	Resigned.
25 Nov 2017	Macedon	John Scott	Independent	DUP	Affiliated.
4 Dec 2017	Macedon	-	DUP	UUP	Scott's seat reverted to UUP on his resignation.
13 Feb 2018	Dunsilly	Brian Duffin	SDLP	Independent	Resigned.
29 Nov 2018	Dunsilly	-	Independent	SDLP	Duffin's seat reverted to SDLP on his resignation.
11 Mar 2019	Threemilewater	Pamela Barr	DUP	Independent	Resigned.

Last updated 26 March 2019.

Current composition: see Antrim and Newtownabbey Borough Council
