= Three Mile Water (District Electoral Area) =

District electoral area in Northern Ireland

- Antrim and Newtownabbey Borough Council DEA constituency

Current constituency
- Created: 2014
- Seats: 6 (2014-)
- Councillors: Tom Campbell (APNI); Mark Cooper (DUP); Stephen Cosgrove (UUP); Sam Flanagan (DUP); Julie Gilmour (APNI); Stephen Ross (DUP)

Three Mile Water DEA within Antrim and Newtownabbey

Three Mile Water is one of the seven district electoral areas (DEA) in Antrim and Newtownabbey, Northern Ireland. The district elects six members to Antrim and Newtownabbey Borough Council and contains the wards of Ballyduff, Fairview, Jordanstown, Monkstown, Mossley and Rostulla. Three Mile Water forms part of the East Antrim constituencies for the Northern Ireland Assembly and UK Parliament and part of the South Antrim constituencies for the Northern Ireland Assembly and UK Parliament.

It was created for the 2014 local elections, largely replacing the University DEA which had existed since 1993.

== Councillors ==
Election	Councillor (Party)	Councillor (Party)	Councillor (Party)	Councillor (Party)	Councillor (Party)	Councillor (Party)
2023	Tom Campbell (Alliance)	Julie Gilmour (Alliance)	Stephen Cosgrove (UUP)	Mark Cooper (DUP)	Sam Flanagan (DUP)	Stephen Ross (DUP)
2019	Tom Campbell (Alliance)	Julie Gilmour (Alliance)	Fraser Agnew (UUP)	Mark Cooper (DUP)	Sam Flanagan (DUP)	Stephen Ross (DUP)
August 2018 Co-Option	Tom Campbell (Alliance)	Stephen McCarthy (UUP)	Fraser Agnew (UUP)	Pamela Barr (DUP)	Sam Flanagan (DUP)	Stephen Ross (DUP)
October 2017 Co-Option	Tom Campbell (Alliance)	Stephen McCarthy (UUP)	Fraser Agnew (UUP)	Pamela Barr (DUP)	William Ball (DUP)	Stephen Ross (DUP)
2014	Tom Campbell (Alliance)	Ben Kelso (UUP)	Fraser Agnew (UUP)	Pamela Barr (DUP)	William Ball (DUP)	Stephen Ross (DUP)

== 2023 Election ==
2019: 3 x DUP, 2 x Alliance, 1 x UUP

2023: 3 x DUP, 2 x Alliance, 1 x UUP

2019–2023 Change: No Change

Three Mile Water - 6 seats
Party	Candidate	FPv%	Count						
Party	Candidate	FPv%	1	2	3	4	5	6	7
DUP	Mark Cooper*	20.19%	1,575						
Alliance	Tom Campbell*	17.82%	1,390						
DUP	Stephen Ross*	15.52%	1,211						
Alliance	Julie Gilmour*	9.11%	711	716.22	955.05	1,057.62	1,328.62		
DUP	Sam Flanagan*	7.36%	574	952.74	954.83	957.83	960.83	963.83	1,206.83
UUP	Stephen Cosgrove	11.52%	899	931.48	942.12	955.5	966.45	1,007.45	1,081.45
UUP	Brian Kerr	6.79%	530	542.76	545.61	557.18	562.37	583.37	661.37
TUV	Trevor Mawhinney	5.45%	425	446.17	446.55	451.93	455.93	460.93	
Sinn Féin	Emmanuel Mullen	4.17%	325	325	328.42	340.56			
Green (NI)	Dylan Loughlin	2.08%	162	162.87	167.81				
Electorate: 15,531 Valid: 7,802 (50.24%) Spoilt: 74 Quota: 1,115 Turnout: 7,876 (50.71%)

== 2019 Election ==
2014: 3 x DUP, 2 x UUP, 1 x Alliance

2019: 3 x DUP, 2 x Alliance, 1 x UUP

2014-2019 Change: Alliance gain from UUP

Three Mile Water - 6 seats
Party	Candidate	FPv%	Count						
Party	Candidate	FPv%	1	2	3	4	5	6	7
DUP	Mark Cooper*	17.48%	1,230						
DUP	Stephen Ross*	15.68%	1,103						
UUP	Fraser Agnew*	15.63%	1,100						
Alliance	Tom Campbell*	15.28%	1,075						
DUP	Sam Flanagan*	6.95%	489	679.62	761.43	770.79	771.27	777.13	996.13
Alliance	Julie Gilmour	10.64%	749	751.34	752.69	755.49	815.01	927.45	975.45
UUP	Stephen McCarthy*	7.31%	514	522.64	528.13	589.41	591.45	651.33	843.33
UKIP	Raymond Stewart	4.53%	319	324.76	328.27	331.55	331.73	347.97	
TUV	Norman Boyd	3.33%	234	240.84	243.81	251.73	252.03	258.7	
Independent	Gary Grattan	3.17%	223	224.8	225.79	227.07	228.57		
Electorate: 14,694 Valid: 7,036 (47.88%) Spoilt: 69 Quota: 1,006 Turnout: 7,105 (48.35%)

== 2014 Election ==
2014: 3 x DUP, 2 x UUP, 1 x Alliance

Three Mile Water - 6 seats
Party	Candidate	FPv%	Count								
Party	Candidate	FPv%	1	2	3	4	5	6	7	8	9
UUP	Fraser Agnew*	19.30%	1,275								
DUP	William Ball* †	11.17%	738	801.44	813.74	1,001.74					
Alliance	Tom Campbell*	11.28%	745	753.84	756.84	756.84	756.84	855.36	1,231.36		
UUP	Ben Kelso †	8.89%	587	756	763.04	773.6	773.9	849.5	881.18	970.18	
DUP	Pamela Barr*	7.96%	526	543.68	546.94	585.32	638.12	657.64	676.68	697.68	815.98
DUP	Stephen Ross	8.43%	557	572.08	589.6	638.2	640.3	655.82	661.6	671.6	772.42
TUV	Trevor Mawhinney	7.93%	524	540.38	549.16	555.46	556.36	577.62	584.14	601.14	740.7
PUP	Darren Logan	5.19%	343	348.2	518.98	521.5	521.5	533.5	536.02	546.02	
Alliance	Lynn Frazer*	6.42%	424	433.36	433.62	433.62	433.62	514.88			
NI21	Gary Grattan	5.59%	369	373.94	376.94	378.94	378.94				
DUP	Robert Hill*	4.44%	293	303.66	305.66						
PUP	Jackie Shaw	3.41%	225	230.46							
Electorate: 13,982 Valid: 6,606 (47.25%) Spoilt: 92 Quota: 944 Turnout: 6,698 (47.90%)
