= Fraser Agnew =

Northern Irish politician

Member of Antrim and Newtownabbey Borough Council
- In office 22 May 2014 – 18 May 2023
- Preceded by: District created
- Succeeded by: Stephen Cosgrove
- Constituency: Three Mile Water

Member of Newtownabbey Borough Council
- In office 19 May 1993 – 22 May 2014
- Preceded by: District created
- Succeeded by: Council abolished
- Constituency: University
- In office 15 May 1985 – 19 May 1993
- Preceded by: District created
- Succeeded by: District abolished
- Constituency: Doagh Road
- In office 20 May 1981 – 15 May 1985
- Preceded by: Ivan Hunter
- Succeeded by: District abolished
- Constituency: Newtownabbey Area B

Member of the Northern Ireland Assembly for Belfast North
- In office 25 June 1998 – 26 November 2003
- Preceded by: New Creation
- Succeeded by: Nelson McCausland

Member of the Northern Ireland Assembly for South Antrim
- In office 1982–1986

Personal details
- Born: Ballyclare, Northern Ireland
- Party: Ulster Unionist Party (pre 1993; 2011–present); United Unionist Coalition (1998–2011)
- Other political affiliations: Independent Unionist (1993–2011)
- Education: University of Ulster

William Alexander Fraser Agnew, known as Fraser Agnew, is a retired Northern Irish unionist politician who was an Antrim and Newtownabbey Councillor for the Three Mile Water DEA from 2014 to 2023. He was previously an Independent Unionist Member of the Legislative Assembly (MLA) for Belfast North from 1998 to 2003.

== Career ==
After growing up in Ballyclare, Agnew studied at the University of Ulster, Jordanstown, Belfast Technical College and the College of Business Studies. He worked as a writer and architectural draughtsperson, and was elected to Newtownabbey Borough Council as an Ulster Unionist Party (UUP) representative for the Newtownabbey Area B District in 1981. Agnew was also elected to the Northern Ireland Assembly in the 1982 election, as a Member for South Antrim.

In the 1985 Northern Ireland local elections, Agnew was re-elected onto Newtownabbey Council as a member of the newly created Doagh Road District.

In 1990, Agnew served as the Mayor of Newtownabbey. In the early 1990s, he left the UUP and was later re-elected in 1993 as an independent Unionist for the University District. In 1996, standing for the 'Independent Templeton' ticket, he was an unsuccessful candidate in the Northern Ireland Forum election in South Antrim. He was elected as an independent in the 1998 Northern Ireland Assembly election, representing North Belfast, when he formed the United Unionist Coalition (UUC) with other anti-Good Friday Agreement unionists.

All three members of the UUC, including Agnew, lost their seats at the 2003 Assembly election. He held his council seat for the UUC in 2005. In March 2007, he was awarded the Freedom of the Borough of Newtownabbey. In January 2011, he rejoined the UUP. Tom Elliot, leader of the UUP had this to say regarding his decision: "I strongly believe that voters across the province will return, like Fraser, to their natural Ulster Unionist home and I am looking forward to making sure that the UUP becomes the party of choice for all shades of progressive Unionist opinion."

Agnew was elected onto the newly formed Antrim and Newtownabbey Borough Council in the 2014 local elections, as a councillor for the Three Mile Water District. He was re-elected in 2019, before retiring at the 2023 local elections.

Northern Ireland Assembly (1982)
New assembly	MPA for South Antrim; 1982–1986	Assembly abolished
Northern Ireland Assembly
New assembly	MLA for Belfast North; 1998–2003	Succeeded by Nelson McCausland
Civic offices
Preceded by George Herron	Mayor of Newtownabbey; 1990–1991	Succeeded by Ken Robinson
Preceded by Victor Robinson	Mayor of Newtownabbey; 2013–2014	Succeeded by Thomas Hogg
