= 2005 Newtownabbey Borough Council election =

Local government election in Northern Ireland

| ← 2001 | 5 May 2005 | 2011 → |

All 25 seats to Newtownabbey Borough Council 13 seats needed for a majority
| | First party | Second party | Third party |
|---|---|---|---|
| Party | DUP | UUP | Alliance |
| Seats won | 12 | 6 | 2 |
| Seat change | ▲4 | ▼3 | ▲1 |
| | Fourth party | Fifth party | Sixth party |
| Party | Newtownabbey Ratepayers | SDLP | Sinn Féin |
| Seats won | 1 | 1 | 1 |
| Seat change | 0 | ▼1 | 0 |
| | Seventh party | Eighth party |
| Party | United Unionist | Independent |
| Seats won | 1 | 1 |
| Seat change | 0 | ▼1 |
- Party with the most votes by district.

Elections to Newtownabbey Borough Council were held on 5 May 2005 on the same day as the other Northern Irish local government elections. The election used four district electoral areas to elect a total of 25 councillors.

== Election results ==
Newtownabbey Borough Council Election Result 2005
| Party | Seats | Gains | Losses | Net gain/loss | Seats % | Votes % | Votes | +/− |
|---|---|---|---|---|---|---|---|---|
| DUP | 12 | 4 | 0 | ▲4 | 48.0 | 43.9 | 13,123 | ▲17.1 |
| UUP | 6 | 0 | 3 | ▼3 | 24.0 | 23.3 | 6,956 | ▼5.9 |
| Alliance | 2 | 1 | 0 | ▲1 | 8.0 | 8.0 | 2,384 | 0.0 |
| Newtownabbey Ratepayers Association | 1 | 0 | 0 | 0 | 4.0 | 6.4 | 1,897 | ▲3.3 |
| SDLP | 1 | 0 | 1 | ▼1 | 2.0 | 6.1 | 1,821 | ▼0.8 |
| Sinn Féin | 1 | 0 | 0 | 0 | 4.0 | 5.9 | 1,771 | ▲0.9 |
| United Unionist Coalition | 1 | 0 | 0 | 0 | 4.0 | 2.5 | 736 | ▼1.2 |
| Independent | 1 | 0 | 0 | ▲1 | 0.0 | 2.2 | 646 | ▼5.9 |
| PUP | 0 | 0 | 0 | 0 | 0.0 | 1.0 | 291 | ▼3.1 |
| NI Conservatives | 0 | 0 | 0 | 0 | 0.0 | 0.8 | 235 | ▲0.3 |

Note: "Votes" are the first preference votes.

== Districts summary ==
Results of the Newtownabbey Borough Council election, 2005 by district
| Ward | % | Cllrs | % | Cllrs | % | Cllrs | % | Cllrs | % | Cllrs | % | Cllrs | Total Cllrs |
| Ward | DUP | | UUP | | Alliance | | SDLP | | Sinn Féin | | Others | | Total Cllrs |
|---|---|---|---|---|---|---|---|---|---|---|---|---|---|
| Antrim Line | 34.7 | 3 | 17.9 | 1 | 9.5 | 1 | 17.9 | 1 | 16.0 | 1 | 4.0 | 0 | 7 |
| Ballyclare | 56.0 | 3 | 33.8 | 2 | 6.7 | 0 | 0.0 | 0 | 0.0 | 0 | 3.5 | 0 | 5 |
| Macedon | 49.5 | 3 | 10.1 | 1 | 0.0 | 0 | 3.7 | 0 | 5.9 | 0 | 30.8 | 2 | 6 |
| University | 40.8 | 3 | 29.2 | 2 | 12.4 | 1 | 0.0 | 0 | 0.0 | 0 | 17.6 | 1 | 7 |
| Total | 43.9 | 12 | 23.3 | 6 | 8.0 | 2 | 6.1 | 1 | 5.9 | 1 | 12.8 | 3 | 25 |

== Districts results ==
=== Antrim Line ===
2001: 2 x DUP, 2 x UUP, 2 x SDLP, 1 x Sinn Féin
2005: 3 x DUP, 1 x UUP, 1 x SDLP, 1 x Sinn Féin, 1 x Alliance
2001-2005 Change: DUP and Alliance gain from UUP and SDLP

Antrim Line - 7 seats
| Party | Candidate | FPv% | Count | | | | | | |
| Party | Candidate | FPv% | 1 | 2 | 3 | 4 | 5 | 6 | 7 |
|---|---|---|---|---|---|---|---|---|---|
| DUP | Nigel Hamilton* | 21.02% | 1,901 | | | | | | |
| SDLP | Noreen McClelland* | 12.23% | 1,106 | 1,106.8 | 1,146.8 | | | | |
| UUP | Janet Crilly* | 12.17% | 1,101 | 1,123 | 1,185 | | | | |
| Alliance | Tom Campbell | 9.50% | 859 | 863.4 | 958.8 | 966.9 | 1,200.9 | | |
| DUP | Mandy Girvan | 4.70% | 425 | 1,049.4 | 1,104.6 | 1,112.7 | 1,115.7 | 1,292.7 | |
| DUP | Paula Bradley | 8.96% | 810 | 894 | 928.4 | 933.8 | 934.2 | 1,138.8 | |
| Sinn Féin | Briege Meehan* | 8.62% | 780 | 780 | 787 | 787 | 914 | 918.4 | 941.4 |
| Sinn Féin | Martin Meehan | 7.41% | 670 | 670 | 670 | 670 | 740 | 741.4 | 750.4 |
| UUP | Ivan Hunter* | 5.70% | 516 | 529.6 | 561 | 592.5 | 609.5 | | |
| SDLP | Tommy McTeague* | 5.69% | 515 | 515.8 | 533.8 | 534.7 | | | |
| Newtownabbey Ratepayers | Jennifer Irvine | 3.29% | 298 | 302.8 | | | | | |
| Independent | Arthur Templeton* | 0.71% | 64 | 66 | | | | | |
Electorate: 15,963 Valid: 9,045 (56.66%) Spoilt: 190 Quota: 1,131 Turnout: 9,235 (57.85%)

=== Ballyclare ===
2001: 3 x UUP, 2 x DUP
2005: 3 x DUP, 2 x UUP
2001-2005 Change: DUP gain from UUP

Ballyclare - 5 seats
| Party | Candidate | FPv% | Count | | | | |
| Party | Candidate | FPv% | 1 | 2 | 3 | 4 | 5 |
|---|---|---|---|---|---|---|---|
| DUP | Paul Girvan* | 50.74% | 3,402 | | | | |
| DUP | Pamela Hunter* | 2.68% | 180 | 1,896.54 | | | |
| DUP | Etta Mann | 2.60% | 174 | 371.65 | 1,104.55 | 1,127.55 | |
| UUP | James Bingham* | 13.80% | 925 | 1,031.53 | 1,042.03 | 1,089.01 | 1,193.01 |
| UUP | Vera McWilliam* | 10.96% | 735 | 850.91 | 860.51 | 931.21 | 1,093.21 |
| UUP | Edward Turkington* | 8.99% | 603 | 691.44 | 701.64 | 746.59 | 841.59 |
| Alliance | Patrick Sweeney | 6.73% | 451 | 457.7 | 458 | 511.61 | |
| NI Conservatives | Alan Greer | 3.50% | 235 | 261.13 | 264.43 | | |
Electorate: 12,101 Valid: 6,705 (55.41%) Spoilt: 155 Quota: 1,118 Turnout: 6,860 (56.69%)

=== Macedon ===
2001: 2 x DUP, 2 x Independent, 1 x UUP, 1 x Newtownabbey Ratepayers
2005: 3 x DUP, 1 x UUP, 1 x Newtownabbey Ratepayers, 1 x Independent
2001-2005 Change: DUP gain from Independent

Macedon - 6 seats
| Party | Candidate | FPv% | Count | | | | | | |
| Party | Candidate | FPv% | 1 | 2 | 3 | 4 | 5 | 6 | 7 |
|---|---|---|---|---|---|---|---|---|---|
| DUP | Billy DeCourcy* | 30.50% | 1,670 | | | | | | |
| Newtownabbey Ratepayers | Billy Webb* | 14.99% | 821 | | | | | | |
| DUP | Victor Robinson | 13.66% | 748 | 1,367.04 | | | | | |
| DUP | Dineen Walker* | 5.33% | 292 | 407.01 | 943.01 | | | | |
| Independent | Tommy Kirkham* | 10.63% | 582 | 645.6 | 656.1 | 703.35 | 729.43 | 735.53 | 846.53 |
| UUP | John Scott | 10.06% | 551 | 574.32 | 591.82 | 672.55 | 715.89 | 732.34 | 824.34 |
| Sinn Féin | Sean Oliver | 5.86% | 321 | 321 | 321.5 | 321.77 | 402.77 | 407.47 | 407.47 |
| PUP | Catherine Robinson | 5.31% | 291 | 338.7 | 348.2 | 376.55 | 384.61 | 389.41 | |
| SDLP | Michael McBrien | 3.65% | 200 | 202.12 | 203.12 | 205.01 | | | |
Electorate: 10,506 Valid: 5,476 (52.12%) Spoilt: 153 Quota: 783 Turnout: 5,629 (53.58%)

=== University ===
2001: 3 x UUP, 2 x DUP, 1 x Alliance, 1 x United Unionist
2005: 3 x DUP, 2 x UUP, 1 x Alliance, 1 x United Unionist
2001-2005 Change: DUP gain from UUP

University - 7 seats
| Party | Candidate | FPv% | Count | | | | | |
| Party | Candidate | FPv% | 1 | 2 | 3 | 4 | 5 | 6 |
|---|---|---|---|---|---|---|---|---|
| DUP | William Ball | 23.45% | 2,025 | | | | | |
| UUP | Ken Robinson* | 16.57% | 1,431 | | | | | |
| DUP | Robert Hill | 7.31% | 631 | 1,418.52 | | | | |
| Alliance | Lynn Frazer* | 12.44% | 1,074 | 1,076.76 | 1,091.01 | | | |
| DUP | John Mann | 10.02% | 865 | 923.88 | 941.63 | 1,260.64 | | |
| UUP | Barbara Gilliland* | 8.70% | 751 | 777.68 | 904.43 | 906.33 | 1,155.33 | |
| United Unionist | Fraser Agnew* | 8.52% | 736 | 769.12 | 792.62 | 794.52 | 906.34 | 1,023.19 |
| Newtownabbey Ratepayers | John Blair | 9.01% | 778 | 789.5 | 806 | 806.19 | 854.4 | 886.7 |
| UUP | Vi Scott* | 3.97% | 343 | 348.52 | 496.02 | 396.97 | | |
Electorate: 15,829 Valid: 8,634 (54.55%) Spoilt: 211 Quota: 1,080 Turnout: 8,845 (55.88%)
