= 2023 Antrim and Newtownabbey Borough Council election =

- 18 May 2023

All 40 council seats 21 seats needed for a majority
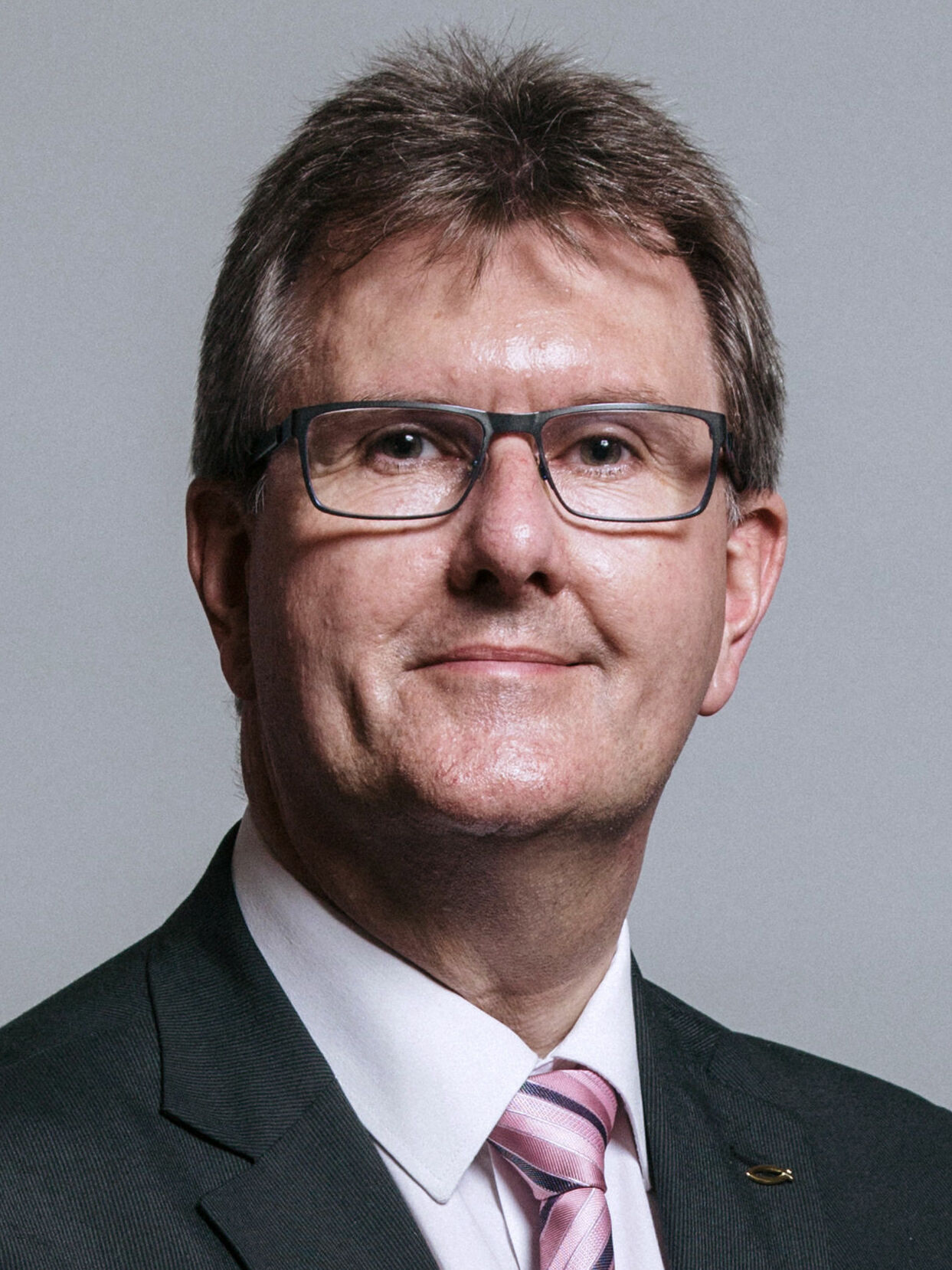

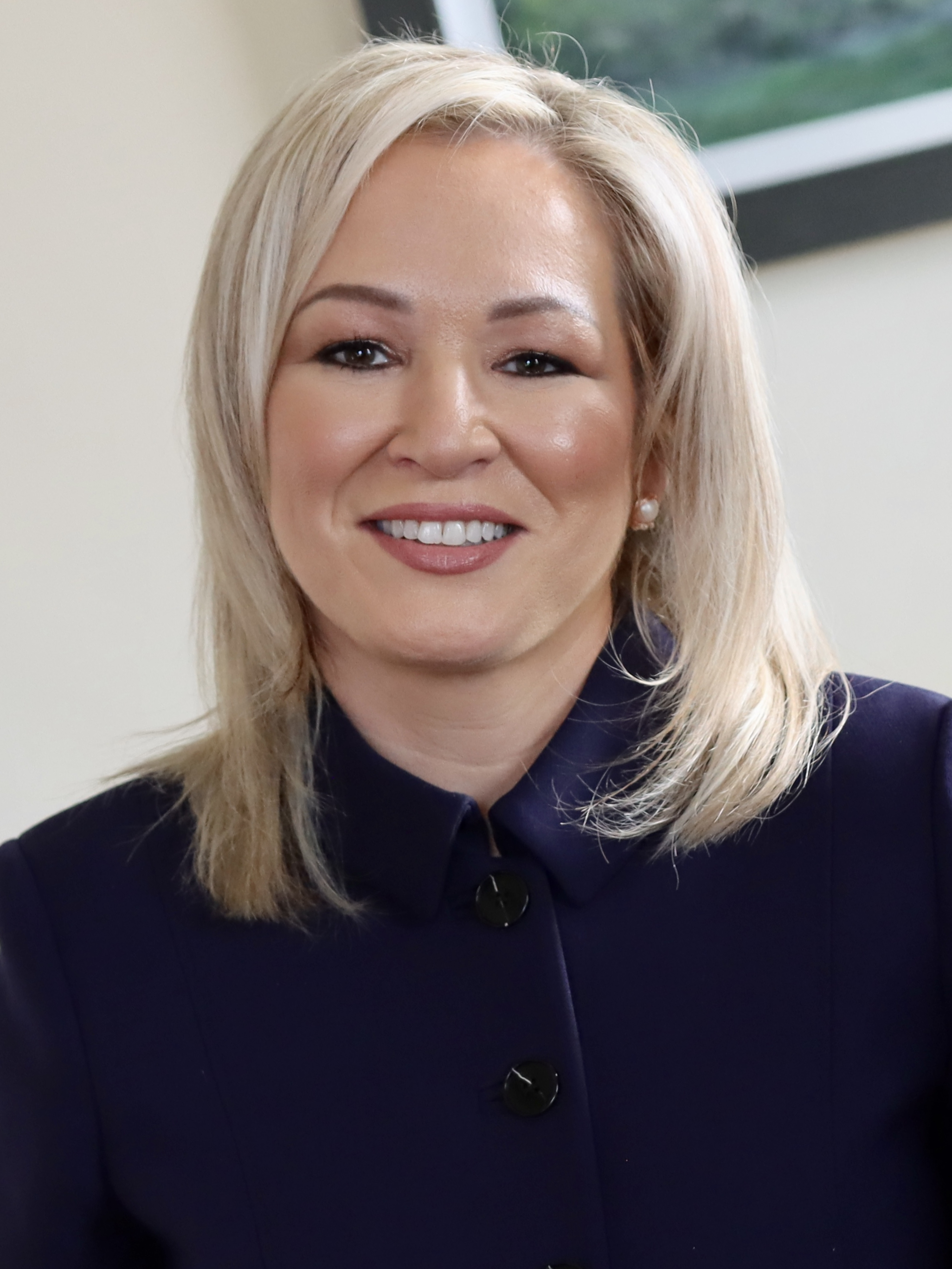

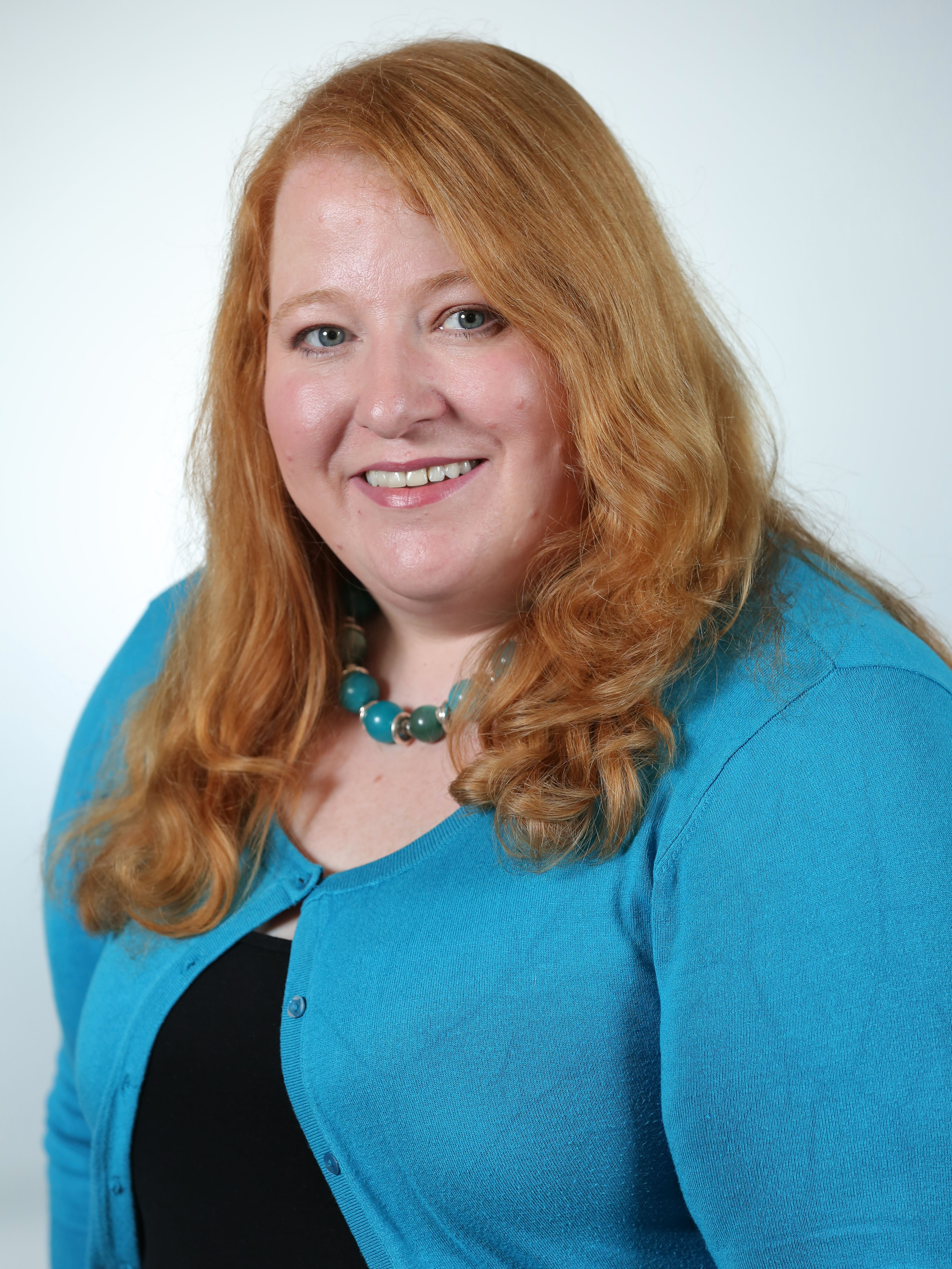

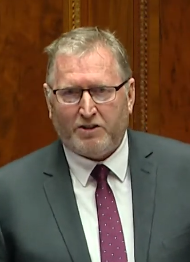

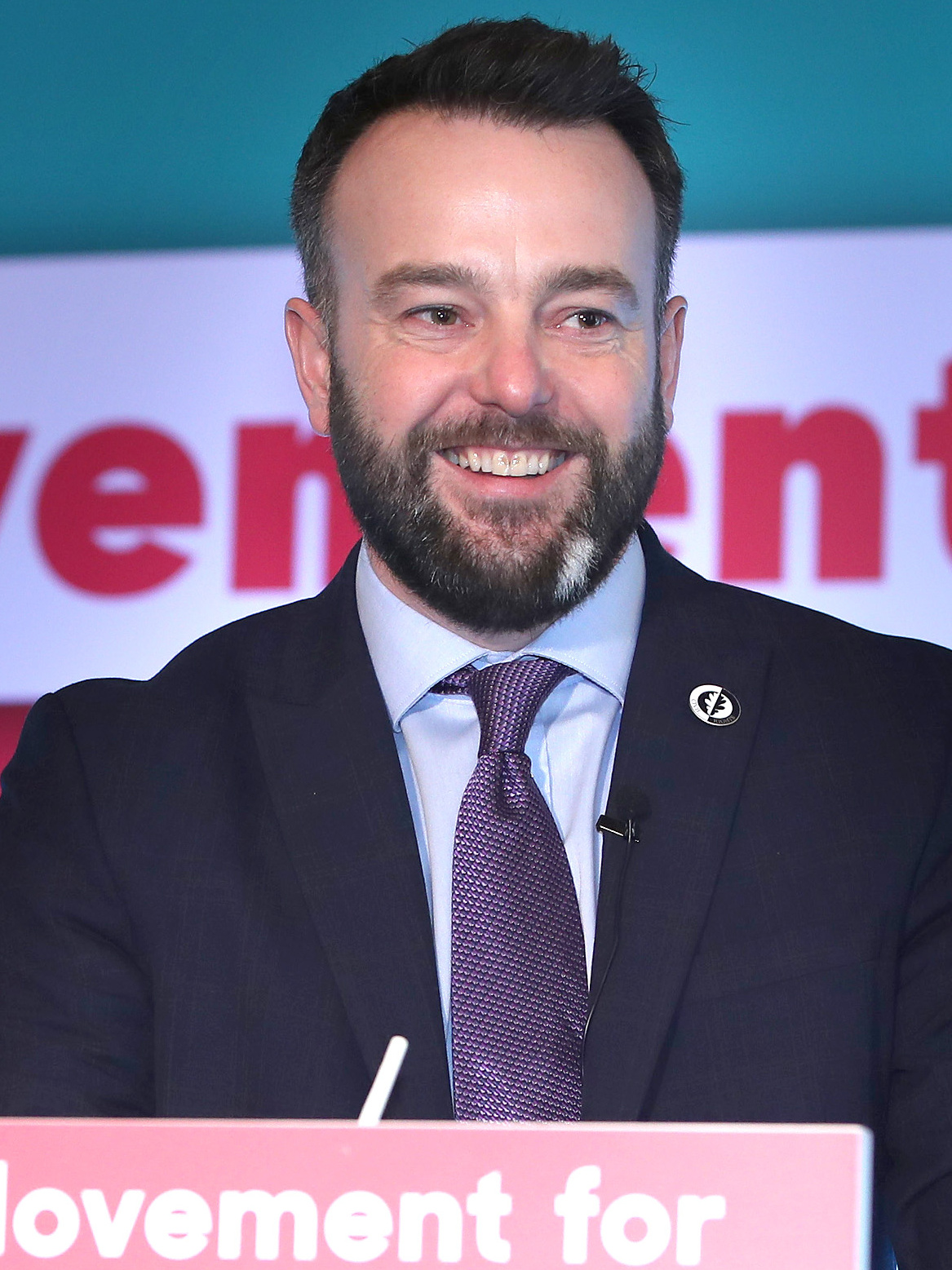
	First party	Second party	Third party
Leader	Jeffrey Donaldson	Michelle O'Neill (Note: The leader of Sinn Féin is Mary Lou McDonald, who sits as a TD in the Irish Dáil Éireann for Dublin Central. O'Neill is the leader of the party in Northern Ireland.)	Naomi Long
Party	DUP	Sinn Féin	Alliance
Last election	14	5	7
Seats won	13	9	8
Seat change	▼1	▲4	▲1
Popular vote	16,066	11,613	9,179
Percentage	30.1%	21.7%	17.1%
Swing	▼1.4%	▲8.6%	▼1.6%
	Fourth party	Fifth party	Sixth party
Leader	Doug Beattie		Colum Eastwood
Party	UUP	Independent	SDLP
Last election	9	1	4
Seats won	7	2	1
Seat change	▼2	▲1	▼3
Popular vote	8,358	1,517	2,829
Percentage	15.7%	2.8%	5.3%
Swing	▼4.6%	▼2.5%	▼2.5%
- Antrim and Newtownabbey 2023 Council Election Results by DEA (Shaded by the plurality of FPVs)
Council control before election
No overall control
Council control after election
Democratic Unionist-Ulster Unionist Executive

The 2023 election to Antrim and Newtownabbey Borough Council was held on 18 May 2023, alongside other local elections in Northern Ireland, two weeks after the local elections in England. The Northern Ireland elections were delayed by 2 weeks to avoid overlapping with the coronation of King Charles III.

They returned 40 members to the council via Single Transferable Vote.

== Election results ==
2023 Antrim and Newtownabbey Borough Council election result
Party	Seats	Gains	Losses	Net gain/loss	Seats %	Votes %	Votes	+/−
DUP	13	0	1	▼1	32.50	30.05	16,066	▼1.42
Sinn Féin	9	4	0	▲4	22.50	21.72	11,613	▲8.66
Alliance	8	1	0	▲1	20.00	17.17	9,179	▼1.52
UUP	7	0	2	▼2	17.50	15.63	8,358	▼4.64
Independent	2	1	0	▲1	5.00	2.84	1,517	▼2.50
SDLP	1	0	3	▼3	2.50	5.29	2,829	▼2.51
TUV	0	0	0	0	0.00	4.49	2,403	▲2.81
Green (NI)	0	0	0	0	0.00	1.80	964	▲1.09
PUP	0	0	0	0	0.00	0.46	244	New
Aontú	0	0	0	0	0.00	0.45	243	New
NI Conservatives	0	0	0	0	0.00	0.09	49	New
Total	40						53,465	

Note: "Votes" are the first preference votes.

== Districts summary ==
Results of the 2023 Antrim and Newtownabbey Borough Council election by district
District Electoral Area (DEA)	%	Cllrs	%	Cllrs	%	Cllrs	%	Cllrs	%	Cllrs	%	Cllrs	Total cllrs
District Electoral Area (DEA)	DUP		Sinn Féin		Alliance		UUP		SDLP		Independents and others		Total cllrs
Airport	22.79	1	36.29	2 ▲1	15.08	1	13.41	1	10.75	0 ▼1	1.67	0	5
Antrim	27.57	2	17.82	1 ▲1	20.87	1	16.64	1 ▼1	9.51	1	7.59	0	6
Ballyclare	36.36	2	1.20	0	13.60	1 ▲1	24.15	1 ▼1	0.00	0	24.84	1	5
Dunsilly	22.57	1	34.94	2 ▲1	12.25	1	11.31	1	9.71	0 ▼1	9.23	0	5
Glengormley Urban	26.06	2	35.29	3 ▲1	16.05	1	10.86	1	6.45	0 ▼1	5.29	0	7
Macedon	32.98	2 ▼1	18.63	1	15.24	1	15.99	1	0.00	0	17.17	1 ▲1	6
Three Mile Water	43.07	3	4.17	0	26.93	2	18.31	1	0.00	0	7.53	0	6
Total	30.05	13 ▼1	21.72	9 ▲4	17.17	8 ▲1	15.63	7 ▼2	5.29	1 ▼3	10.14	2 ▲1	40

== District results ==
=== Airport ===
2019: 1 x DUP, 1 x Sinn Féin, 1 x UUP, 1 x Alliance, 1 x SDLP

2023: 2 x Sinn Féin, 1 x DUP, 1 x UUP, 1 x Alliance

2019–2023 Change: Sinn Féin gain from SDLP

Airport - 5 seats
Party	Candidate	FPv%	Count			
Party	Candidate	FPv%	1	2	3	4
DUP	Matthew Magill*	22.79%	1,827			
Sinn Féin	Anne-Marie Logue*	19.64%	1,574			
Sinn Féin	Maighréad Ní Chonghaile	16.65%	1,335	1,355		
UUP	Paul Michael* ‡	13.41%	1,075	1,086	1,536.63	
Alliance	Andrew McAuley*	15.08%	1,209	1,281	1,295.58	1,342.02
SDLP	Thomas Burns*	10.75%	862	889	898.72	1,081.96
Green (NI)	Terri Johnston	1.67%	134			
Electorate: 15,479 Valid: 8,016 (51.79%) Spoilt: 55 Quota: 1,337 Turnout: 8,071 (52.14%)

=== Antrim ===
2019: 2 x DUP, 2 x UUP, 1 x Alliance, 1 x SDLP

2023: 2 x DUP, 1 x Sinn Féin, 1 x Alliance, 1 x UUP, 1 x SDLP

2019–2023 Change: Sinn Féin gain from UUP

Antrim - 6 seats
Party	Candidate	FPv%	Count							
Party	Candidate	FPv%	1	2	3	4	5	6	7	8
Sinn Féin	Lucille O'Hagan	17.82%	1,270							
Alliance	Neil Kelly*	15.31%	1,091							
DUP	Paul Dunlop*	13.84%	986	987.05	1,078.05					
DUP	John Smyth*	10.12%	721	722.26	857.26	858.46	905.36	1,168.36		
SDLP	Roisin Lynch*	9.51%	678	851.67	888.34	902.68	903.35	913.35	914.71	1,104.71
UUP	Leah Smyth*	10.44%	744	746.1	764.31	768.15	770.16	867.16	963.04	1,032.04
UUP	Jim Montgomery*	6.20%	442	443.47	461.47	463.81	470.51	527.72	576	610
Alliance	Tommy Monahan	5.56%	396	443.04	482.77	524.59	524.59	536.07	538.79	
TUV	Richard Shields	6.36%	453	454.05	465.05	465.47	467.48			
DUP	Karl McMeekin	3.61%	257	257.21						
Green (NI)	Eleanor Bailey	1.23%	88	101.23						
Electorate: 16,652 Valid: 7,126 (42.79%) Spoilt: 89 Quota: 1,019 Turnout: 7,215 (43.33%)

=== Ballyclare ===
2019: 2 x UUP, 2 x DUP, 1 x Independent

2023: 2 x DUP, 1 x UUP, 1 x Alliance, 1 x Independent

2019–2023 Change: Alliance gain from UUP

Ballyclare - 5 seats
Party	Candidate	FPv%	Count				
Party	Candidate	FPv%	1	2	3	4	5
DUP	Jeannie Archibald*	23.18%	1,655				
DUP	Helen Magill	13.18%	947	1,297.46			
UUP	Vera McWilliam*	15.74%	1,131	1,151.52	1,159.79	1,620.79	
Alliance	Lewis Boyle	13.60%	977	984.02	1,103.02	1,129.29	1,234.29
Independent	Michael Stewart*	12.92%	928	937.99	990.99	1,041.5	1,153.5
TUV	Mel Lucas	10.40%	747	791.55	793.82	845.14	1,004.14
UUP	Norrie Ramsay*	8.41%	604	615.07	619.34		
Green (NI)	Robert Robinson	1.52%	109	109.81			
Sinn Féin	Gerard Magee	1.20%	86	86.27			
Electorate: 14,151 Valid: 7,184 (50.77%) Spoilt: 64 Quota: 1,198 Turnout: 7,248 (51.22%)

=== Dunsilly ===
2019: 1 x DUP, 1 x Sinn Féin, 1 x UUP, 1 x Alliance, 1 x SDLP

2023: 2 x Sinn Féin, 1 x DUP, 1 x Alliance, 1 x UUP

2019–2023 Change: Sinn Féin gain from SDLP

Dunsilly - 5 seats
Party	Candidate	FPv%	Count							
Party	Candidate	FPv%	1	2	3	4	5	6	7	8
Sinn Féin	Henry Cushinan*	18.65%	1,390							
Sinn Féin	Annie O'Lone	16.29%	1,214	1,312						
DUP	Linda Clarke*	13.11%	977	986	1,153	1,153.13	1,153.13	1,773.13		
UUP	Stewart Wilson	11.31%	843	843	951	951.78	951.78	1,134.78	1,644.78	
Alliance	Jay Burbank*	12.25%	913	930	935	965.29	969.74	982.74	997.74	1,128.74
SDLP	Ryan Wilson*	9.71%	724	794	801	907.08	971.16	972.16	977.16	1,000.16
DUP	Tom Cunningham	9.46%	705	705	846	846.13	846.13			
TUV	Jonathan Campbell	5.97%	445	446						
Aontú	Siobhán McErlean	3.26%	243							
Electorate: 13,300 Valid: 7,454 (56.05%) Spoilt: 69 Quota: 1,243 Turnout: 7,523 (56.56%)

=== Glengormley Urban ===
2019: 2 x DUP, 2 x Sinn Féin, 1 x Alliance, 1 x UUP, 1 x SDLP

2023: 3 x Sinn Féin, 2 x DUP, 1 x Alliance, 1 x UUP

2019–2023 Change: Sinn Féin gain from SDLP

Glengormley Urban - 7 seats
Party	Candidate	FPv%	Count						
Party	Candidate	FPv%	1	2	3	4	5	6	7
DUP	Alison Bennington*	16.34%	1,432						
Sinn Féin	Eamonn McLaughlin	14.60%	1,280						
DUP	Paula Bradley*	9.72%	852	1,151.92					
Alliance	Julian McGrath*	11.34%	994	996.76	999.42	1,012.42	1,072.84	1,434.84	
UUP	Mark Cosgrove*	10.86%	952	969.25	969.39	1,041.69	1,069.92	1,104.92	
Sinn Féin	Rosie Kinnear*	11.09%	972	972.23	1,011.43	1,014.8	1,052.22	1,066.64	1,094.64
Sinn Féin	Michael Goodman*	9.59%	841	841.69	966.57	969.57	994.13	1,008.83	1,030.83
SDLP	Noreen McClelland*	6.45%	565	567.07	574.35	582.35	632.63	707.03	907.03
Alliance	Anita Piatek	4.71%	413	413.69	416.63	422.77	532		
Green (NI)	Lesley Veronica	3.57%	313	313.92	315.46	341.06			
Independent	Michael Maguire	1.16%	102	104.07	104.49				
NI Conservatives	Jason Reid	0.56%	49	50.15	50.15				
Electorate: 16,445 Valid: 8,765 (53.30%) Spoilt: 129 Quota: 1,096 Turnout: 8,894 (54.08%)

=== Macedon ===
2019: 3 x DUP, 1 x Alliance, 1 x UUP, 1 x Sinn Féin

2023: 2 x DUP, 1 x Sinn Féin, 1 x UUP, 1 x Alliance, 1 x Independent

2019–2023 Change: Independent gain from DUP

Macedon - 6 seats
Party	Candidate	FPv%	Count							
Party	Candidate	FPv%	1	2	3	4	5	6	7	8
Sinn Féin	Taylor McGrann*	18.63%	1,326							
DUP	Matthew Brady*	17.14%	1,220							
UUP	Robert Foster*	15.99%	1,138							
Alliance	Billy Webb*	15.24%	1,085							
DUP	Ben Mallon*	8.06%	574	576.05	728.21	757.8	848.12	850.01	1,039.01	
Independent	Stafford Ward	6.84%	487	518.16	523.92	552.85	611.8	623.7	683.8	836.19
DUP	Victor Robinson*	7.78%	553	555.05	571.37	584.9	608.42	610.45	722.49	751.79
Green (NI)	Ellie Byrne	2.22%	158	420.4	422.16	427.22	443.25	491.76	512.08	
TUV	Norman Boyd	4.68%	333	334.64	345.2	363.79	433.8	435.76		
PUP	Rosemary Bell-McCracken	3.43%	244	250.56	258.24	281.89				
Electorate: 14,554 Valid: 7,118 (48.91%) Spoilt: 85 Quota: 1,017 Turnout: 7,203 (49.49%)

=== Three Mile Water ===
2019: 3 x DUP, 2 x Alliance, 1 x UUP

2023: 3 x DUP, 2 x Alliance, 1 x UUP

2019–2023 Change: No Change

Three Mile Water - 6 seats
Party	Candidate	FPv%	Count						
Party	Candidate	FPv%	1	2	3	4	5	6	7
DUP	Mark Cooper*	20.19%	1,575						
Alliance	Tom Campbell*	17.82%	1,390						
DUP	Stephen Ross*	15.52%	1,211						
Alliance	Julie Gilmour*	9.11%	711	716.22	955.05	1,057.62	1,328.62		
DUP	Sam Flanagan*	7.36%	574	952.74	954.83	957.83	960.83	963.83	1,206.83
UUP	Stephen Cosgrove	11.52%	899	931.48	942.12	955.5	966.45	1,007.45	1,081.45
UUP	Brian Kerr	6.79%	530	542.76	545.61	557.18	562.37	583.37	661.37
TUV	Trevor Mawhinney	5.45%	425	446.17	446.55	451.93	455.93	460.93	
Sinn Féin	Emmanuel Mullen	4.17%	325	325	328.42	340.56			
Green (NI)	Dylan Loughlin	2.08%	162	162.87	167.81				
Electorate: 15,531 Valid: 7,802 (50.24%) Spoilt: 74 Quota: 1,115 Turnout: 7,876 (50.71%)

== Changes during the term ==
=== ‡ Changes in affiliation ===
Date	Electoral Area	Name	Previous affiliation	New affiliation	Circumstance
21 May 2024	Airport	Paul Michael	UUP	Independent	Left the UUP after criticising the party's decision to line up Mike Nesbitt as Health Minister to replace Robin Swann, and criticising the party's response to the two-day suspension of Steve Aiken from the Assembly.
