= Antrim and Newtownabbey =

Local government district in Northern Ireland

- District and borough
- Antrim and Newtownabbey shown within Northern Ireland
- Coordinates: 54°43′N 6°13′W
- Sovereign state: United Kingdom
- Country: Northern Ireland
- Incorporated: 1 April 2015
- Named after: Borough of Antrim and Borough of Newtownabbey
- Administrative HQ: Mossley Mill and Antrim Civic Centre

Government
  - Type: District council
  - Body: Antrim and Newtownabbey Borough Council
  - Executive: Committee system
  - Control: No overall control

Area
  - Total: 220 sq mi (571 km^{2})
  - Rank: 8th

Population (2024)
  - Total: 148,100
  - Rank: 8th
  - Density: 670/sq mi (259/km^{2})
- Time zone: UTC+0 (GMT)
  - Summer (DST): UTC+1 (BST)
- Postcode areas: BT
- Dialling codes: 028
- ISO 3166 code: GB-ANN
- GSS code: N09000001
- Website: www.antrimandnewtownabbey.gov.uk

Antrim and Newtownabbey is a local government district in Northern Ireland. The district was created on 1 April 2015 by merging the Borough of Antrim with the Borough of Newtownabbey. The local authority is Antrim and Newtownabbey Borough Council.

== Geography ==
The district stretches 274 square miles (710 km^{2}) from the lower River Bann and Lough Neagh to the shores of Belfast Lough. It has a population of 148,100. The name of the new district was recommended on 17 September 2008.

== Antrim and Newtownabbey Borough Council ==
Antrim and Newtownabbey Borough Council replaced Antrim Borough Council and Newtownabbey Borough Council. The first election for the new district council was originally due to take place in May 2009, but on 25 April 2008 Shaun Woodward, Secretary of State for Northern Ireland, announced that the scheduled 2009 district council elections were to be postponed until 2011. The first elections took place on 22 May 2014 and the council acted as a shadow authority until 1 April 2015.

== Freedom of the Borough ==
The following people, military units and organisation and groups have received the Freedom of the Borough of Antrim and Newtownabbey and its predecessors.

=== Individuals ===
- Bertram Bickerstaff: 1 June 1982.
- Doris E. Robb: 1 June 1982.
- Sidney R. Cameron: 31 October 1992.
- Dr. Willie John McBride: 31 October 1992.
- George L. Herron: 28 May 1998.
- James J. Rooney: 26 May 2001.
- Samuel J. Magee : 25 May 2004.
- Sir A.P. McCoy: 10 September 2005. (Borough of Antrim)
- Tommy McTeague: 24 November 2005. (Borough of Newtownabbey)
- W.A. Fraser Agnew : 31 October 1992.
- Wolf-Dietrich Rienacker: 9 October 2008. (Borough of Newtownabbey)
- Dr. Peter Fitzgerald: 3 June 2009.
- Norman Dunn: 29 October 2009.lDavid Hollis TUV. JH AllisterTUV 2009)
- Dr. Rorlof Schierbeek: 12 February 2010. (Borough of Antrim)
- Jonathan Rea: 15 January 2019.
- Jacqueline "Jacqui" Dixon: 9 February 2024.

=== Military Units ===
- The Royal Ulster Constabulary: 1 June 1984. (Borough of Newtownabbey)
- The Royal Ulster Constabulary Reserve: 1 June 1984. (Borough of Newtownabbey)
- The Ulster Defence Regiment: 11 March 1989. (Borough of Newtownabbey)
- The Ulster Defence Regiment: 28 April 1990. (Borough of Antrim)
- The Royal Irish Rangers: 5 May 1990. (Borough of Newtownabbey)
- The Royal Air Force: 17 April 1993. (Borough of Newtownabbey)
- 321 EOD Squadron, RLC: 30 October 1993. (Borough of Newtownabbey)
- The Royal British Legion: 11 May 1996. (Borough of Newtownabbey)
- The Royal Air Force: 15 March 1997. (Borough of Antrim)
- The Royal Ulster Constabulary: 3 March 2001. (Borough of Antrim)
- The Royal Ulster Constabulary Reserve: 3 March 2001. (Borough of Antrim)
- Northern Ireland Burma Star Association: 6 April 2002. (Borough of Newtownabbey)
- The Royal Navy: 18 May 2002.
- The Royal Naval Reserve: 18 May 2002.
- The Royal Marines: 18 May 2002.
- The Royal Marines Reserve: 18 May 2002.
- The Royal British Legion: 24 June 2006. (Borough of Antrim)
- 25 Engineer Regiment, RE: 26 May 2007. (Borough of Antrim)
- The Merchant Navy: 4 April 2012.

=== Organisations and Groups ===
- The Northern Ireland Hospice: 24 May 2022.
- The Northern Ireland Ambulance Service: 10 December 2003. (Borough of Antrim)
- The Northern Ireland Fire and Rescue Service: 10 December 2003. (Borough of Antrim)
- The Northern Ireland Fire and Rescue Service: 24 May 2000. (Borough of Newtownabbey)

== See also ==
- Local government in Northern Ireland
