= Antrim and Newtownabbey Borough Council =

Local authority in Northern Ireland

Type
- Type: District council of Antrim and Newtownabbey

History
- Founded: 1 April 2015
- Preceded by: Antrim Borough Council; Newtownabbey Borough Council

Leadership
- Mayor: Henry Cushinan, Sinn Féin
- Deputy Mayor: Alison Bennington, Democratic Unionist Party

Structure
- Seats: 40
- Graph of the party split among 40 seats.
- Political groups: All parties (40) DUP (13) UUP (6) Sinn Féin (9) Alliance (8) SDLP (1) Independent (3)
- Length of term: 4 years

Elections
- Voting system: Single transferable vote
- Last election: 18 May 2023
- Next election: 6 May 2027

Meeting place
- Civic Centre, Antrim and Mossley Mill, Newtownabbey (alternately)

Website
- antrimandnewtownabbey.gov.uk

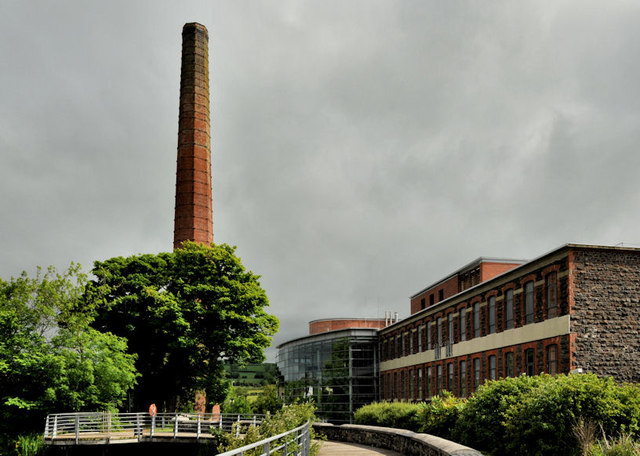
Mossley Mill, Newtownabbey: One of the council's two main administrative buildings

Antrim and Newtownabbey Borough Council is a local authority that was established on 1 April 2015. It replaces Antrim Borough Council and Newtownabbey Borough Council. A statutory transition committee was established in 2013 to prepare for the merger. The first elections to the authority were on 22 May 2014 with 73 candidates standing for 40 seats. The authority acted in shadow form until the formal creation of the Antrim and Newtownabbey district on 1 April 2015.

== Transition committee ==
The statutory transition committee was established in 2013 with a membership of eight councillors each from Antrim Borough Council and Newtownabbey Borough Council. The purpose of the committee was to ensure that the new council would be ready to operate from 1 April 2015; to plan for the period up to and after the election of the shadow council; to arrange the first meeting of the shadow council; and to appoint a chief executive.

== Borough status ==
A new local government district was created on 1 April 2015 and is formally called the Antrim and Newtownabbey District, while the council is the Antrim and Newtownabbey District Council. Both of the previous authorities merged into it had borough status, which entitled them to be known as borough councils and the districts to be known as boroughs. The 2013 corporate plan of the statutory transition committee indicated that the new council was expected to retain this status.

== Mayoralty ==
=== Mayor ===
From	To	Name	Party
2015	2016	Thomas Hogg	DUP
2016	2017	John Scott	UUP
2017	2018	Paul Hamill	DUP
2018	2019	Paul Michael	UUP
2019	2020	John Smyth	DUP
2020	2021	Jim Montgomery	UUP
2021	2022	Billy Webb	Alliance
2022	2023	Stephen Ross	DUP
2023	2024	Mark Cooper	DUP
2024	2025	Neil Kelly	Alliance
2025	2026	Leah Kirkpatrick	UUP
2026	Present	Henry Cushinan	Sinn Féin

=== Deputy Mayor ===
From	To	Name	Party
2015	2016	John Blair	Alliance
2016	2017	Noreen McClelland	SDLP
2017	2018	Vera McWilliam	UUP
2018	2019	John Smyth	DUP
2019	2020	Anne Marie Logue	Sinn Féin
2020	2021	Noreen McClelland	SDLP
2021	2022	Stephen Ross	DUP
2022	2023	Leah Smyth	UUP
2023	2024	Rosie Kinnear	Sinn Féin
2024	2025	Paul Dunlop	DUP
2025	2026	Julie Gilmour	Alliance
2026	Present	Alison Bennington	DUP

== Councillors ==
For the purpose of elections the council is divided into seven district electoral areas (DEAs).

Area	Seats
Airport	5
Antrim	6
Ballyclare	5
Dunsilly	5
Glengormley Urban	7
Macedon	6
Threemilewater	6

=== Seat summary ===
Party	Elected 2014	Elected 2019	Elected 2023	Current
DUP	15	14	13	13
Sinn Féin	3	5	9	9
Alliance	4	7	8	8
UUP	12	9	7	6
SDLP	4	4	1	1
TUV	2	0	0	0
Independent	0	1	2	3

=== Councillors by electoral area ===
Borders of the DEAs within Antrim and Newtownabbey

This list reflects the order in which councillors were elected at the 2023 Antrim and Newtownabbey Borough Council election.

Current council members
District electoral area	Name	Party
Airport	Matthew Magill	DUP
Airport	Anne-Marie Logue	Sinn Féin
Airport	Maighréad Ní Chonghaile	Sinn Féin
Airport	Paul Michael ‡	Independent
Airport	Andrew McAuley	Alliance
Antrim	Lucille O'Hagan	Sinn Féin
Antrim	Neil Kelly	Alliance
Antrim	Paul Dunlop	DUP
Antrim	John Smyth	DUP
Antrim	Roisin Lynch	SDLP
Antrim	Leah Smyth	UUP
Ballyclare	Jeannie Archibald	DUP
Ballyclare	Helen Magill	DUP
Ballyclare	Vera McWilliam	UUP
Ballyclare	Lewis Boyle	Alliance
Ballyclare	Michael Stewart	Independent
Dunsilly	Henry Cushnihan	Sinn Féin
Dunsilly	Annie O'Lone	Sinn Féin
Dunsilly	Linda Clarke	DUP
Dunsilly	Stewart Wilson	UUP
Dunsilly	Jay Burbank	Alliance
Glengormley Urban	Alison Bennington	DUP
Glengormley Urban	Eamonn McLaughlin	Sinn Féin
Glengormley Urban	Paula Bradley	DUP
Glengormley Urban	Mark Cosgrove	UUP
Glengormley Urban	Julian McGrath	Alliance
Glengormley Urban	Rosie Kinnear	Sinn Féin
Glengormley Urban	Michael Goodman	Sinn Féin
Macedon	Taylor McGrann	Sinn Féin
Macedon	Matthew Brady	DUP
Macedon	Robert Foster	UUP
Macedon	Billy Webb	Alliance
Macedon	Ben Mallon	DUP
Macedon	Stafford Ward	Independent
Three Mile Water	Mark Cooper	DUP
Three Mile Water	Tom Campbell	Alliance
Three Mile Water	Stephen Ross	DUP
Three Mile Water	Julie Gilmour	Alliance
Three Mile Water	Sam Flanagan	DUP
Three Mile Water	Stephen Cosgrove	UUP

== Population ==
The area covered by the new Council had a population of 138,567 residents according to the 2011 Northern Ireland census.

The population of Antrim and Newtownabbey was 145,661 at the time of the 2021 census. An increase of 5.1% since the 2011 Census.

== Christmas in the Borough ==
In September 2018 the council cancelled the Christmas tree and lights switch on for the town of Crumlin. The move, to reduce the budget allocation for Christmas across the borough, was the result of a £1 million rate reduction for Belfast International Airport, Aldergrove. Crumlin was to be the only town in the borough without a Christmas tree or lights in 2018, and the only town in Northern Ireland without council funding for Christmas. The initial proposals on Christmas funding came before the council in November 2017, when an amendment to the motion was moved to include Crumlin, but the vote was tied at 18-18, and the Mayor used his casting vote against it.

However, a number of Christmas events took place across the Borough in 2018. Community groups received funding from the council to organise Christmas switch on events, and there were street markets at the switch on events at Antrim, Ballyclare, Glengormley, and Randalstown.

The Enchanted Winter Garden returned to Antrim Castle's Gardens from 7 to 17 December. An Evening of Inclusive Enchantment was planned for 18 December, with reduced numbers, lighting, and sound levels, a sensory and quiet room, ideal for children and adults with additional needs.

== Arms ==
Coat of arms of Antrim and Newtownabbey Borough Council

Notes
Granted 20 March 2017 by the College of Arms.
Crest
Upon a helm issuant from a mural crown Or an eagle displayed Gules holding in the beak Or a dexter hand couped Gules and supporting with the sinister foot a staff erect Or flying therefrom to the sinister a windsock Argent.
Escutcheon
Gules issuant from a plain Base barry wavy of four Argent and Azure a representation of the Outer Barbican Gate at Antrim Castle proper door Gules on a Chief Argent a Chief Vert thereon a Water Wheel in trian aspect Argent between two Bezants each charged with a Cog Wheel Sable.
Supporters
Dexter a stag Sable attired and unguled Or supporting between the forelegs a representation of Antrim Round Tower Proper and sinister a griffin Sable beaked and supporting between the forelegs Or a representation of the Mossley Hill Chimney Proper.
Compartment
Grass Vert growing therefrom twelve stalks of barley Or.
Motto
In Prosperitatem Communem

== See also ==
- Local government in Northern Ireland
- 2014 Northern Ireland local elections
- Political make-up of local councils in the United Kingdom
