= 2005 Antrim Borough Council election =

Local government election in Northern Ireland

← 2001	5 May 2005	2011 →

All 19 seats to Antrim Borough Council 10 seats needed for a majority
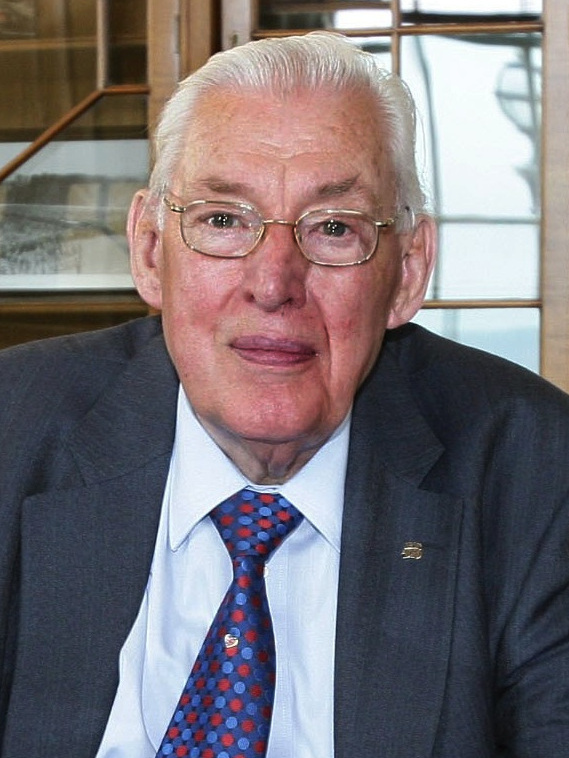

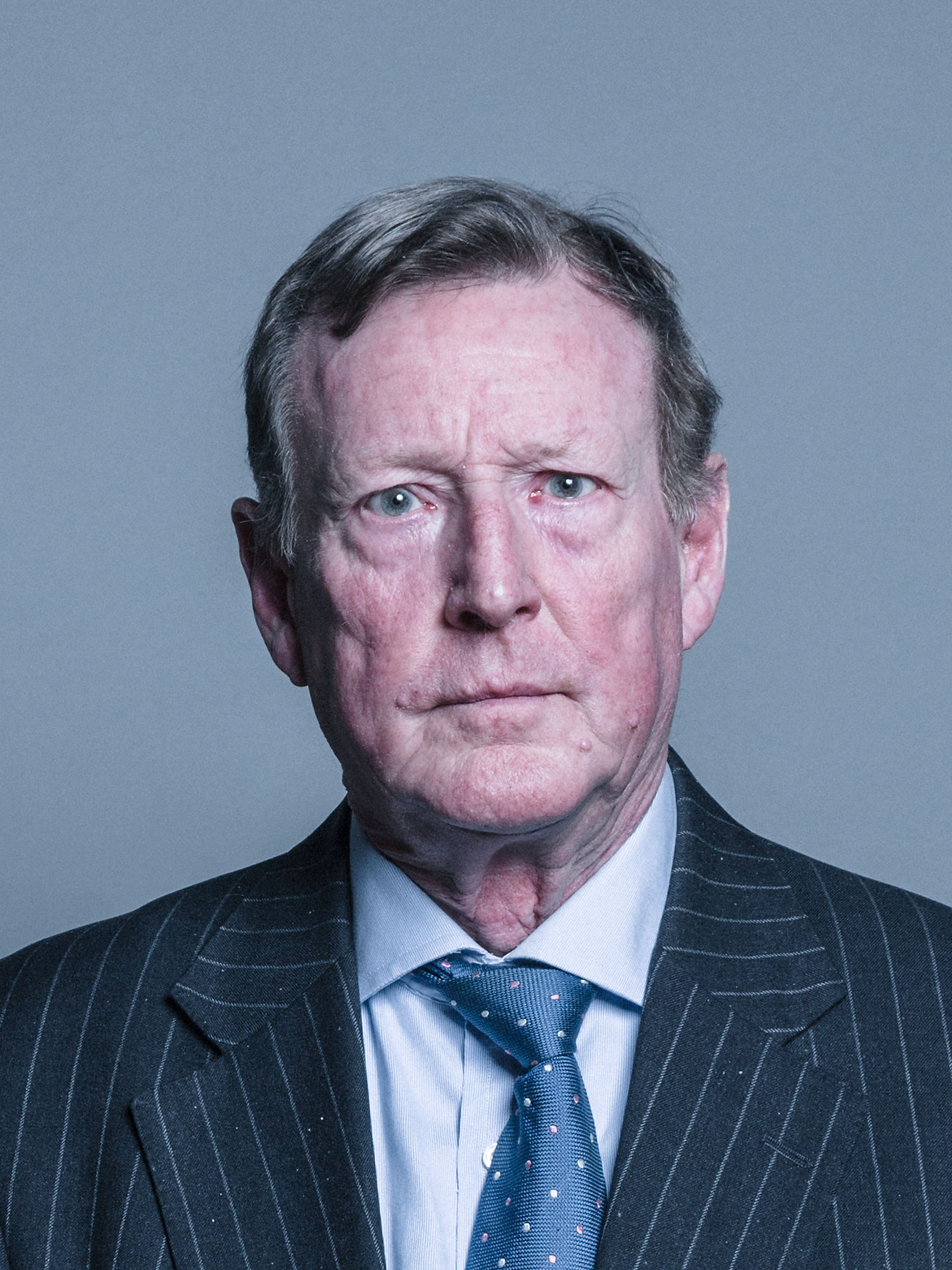

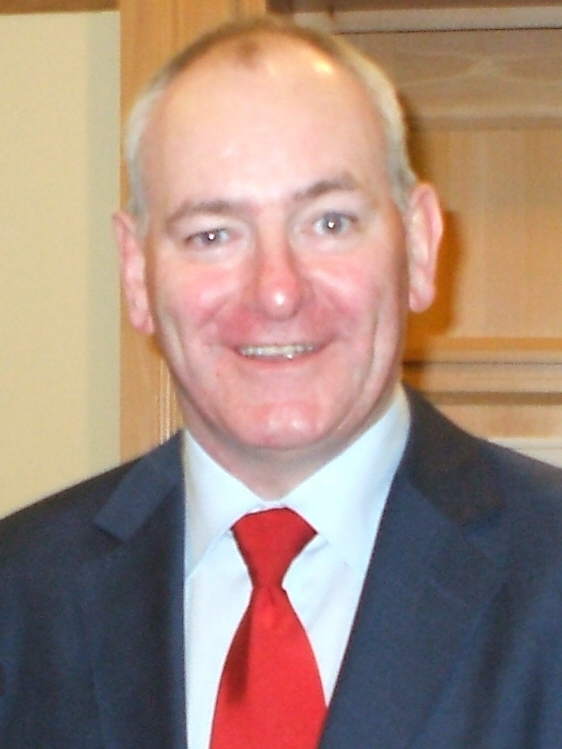

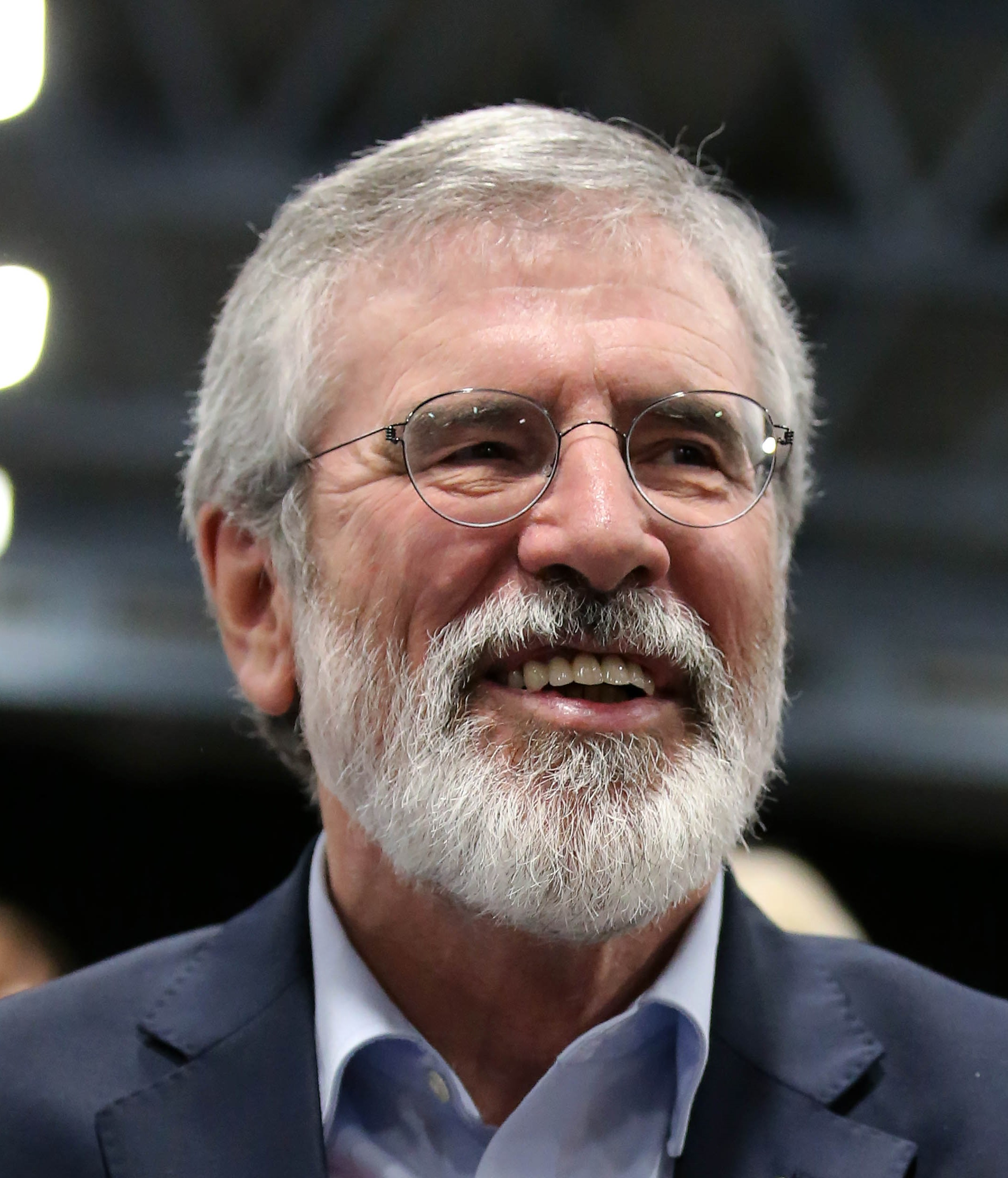

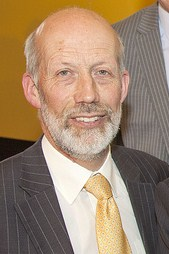
	First party	Second party	Third party
Leader	Ian Paisley	David Trimble	Mark Durkan
Party	DUP	UUP	SDLP
Seats won	6	5	3
Seat change	▲1	▼2	▼2
Percentage	30.7%	23.8%	20.5%
Swing	▲8.2%	▼9.2%	▼0.5%
	Fourth party	Fifth party
Leader	Gerry Adams	David Ford
Party	Sinn Féin	Alliance
Seats won	3	2
Seat change	▲1	▲2
Percentage	14.8%	6.9%
Swing	▲2.3%	▲1.4%
- 2005 Antrim Council Election Results, shaded by plurality of First Preference Votes.

Elections to Antrim Borough Council were held on 5 May 2005 on the same day as the other Northern Irish local government elections. The election used three district electoral areas to elect a total of 19 councillors.

== Election results ==
Antrim Borough Council Election Result 2005
Party	Seats	Gains	Losses	Net gain/loss	Seats %	Votes %	Votes	+/−
DUP	6	1	0	▲1	31.6	30.7	5,434	▲8.2
UUP	5	0	2	▼2	26.3	23.8	4,203	▼9.2
SDLP	3	0	2	▼2	15.8	20.5	3,633	▼0.5
Sinn Féin	3	1	0	▲1	15.8	14.8	2,620	▲2.3
Alliance	2	2	0	▲2	10.5	6.9	1,214	▲1.4
Independent	0	0	0	0	0.0	2.6	468	▼0.5
PUP	0	0	0	0	0.0	0.6	110	▼0.2

Note: "Votes" are the first preference votes.

== Districts summary ==
Results of the Antrim Borough Council election, 2005 by district
Ward	%	Cllrs	%	Cllrs	%	Cllrs	%	Cllrs	%	Cllrs	%	Cllrs	Total Cllrs
Ward	DUP		UUP		SDLP		Sinn Féin		Alliance		Others		Total Cllrs
Antrim North West	24.9	1	14.1	1	27.4	1	28.7	2	0.0	0	4.9	0	5
Antrim South East	34.6	2	27.4	2	20.0	1	9.0	1	8.3	1	0.7	0	7
Antrim Town	31.2	3	28.4	2	14.6	1	9.0	0	11.7	1	5.1	0	7
Total	30.7	6	23.8	5	20.5	3	14.8	3	6.9	2	3.3	0	19

== Districts results ==
=== Antrim North West ===
2001: 2 x SDLP, 1 x Sinn Féin, 1 x DUP, 1 x UUP
2005: 2 x Sinn Féin, 1 x SDLP, 1 x DUP, 1 x UUP
2001-2005 Change: Sinn Féin gain from SDLP

Antrim North West - 5 seats
Party	Candidate	FPv%	Count			
Party	Candidate	FPv%	1	2	3	4
SDLP	Robert Loughran*	19.37%	1,008			
Sinn Féin	Henry Cushinan	16.81%	875			
UUP	Stephen Nicholl*	14.10%	734	821	876	
Sinn Féin	Anthony Brady	11.93%	621	621	800	925.25
DUP	Trevor Clarke	13.37%	696	791	795	801.25
DUP	Wilson Clyde*	11.49%	598	639	645	653.25
SDLP	Donovan McClelland*	8.03%	418	430		
Independent	Brian Johnston	4.90%	255			
Electorate: 8,345 Valid: 5,205 (62.37%) Spoilt: 110 Quota: 868 Turnout: 5,315 (63.69%)

=== Antrim South East ===
2001: 3 x UUP, 2 x DUP, 1 x SDLP, 1 x Sinn Féin
2005: 2 x DUP, 2 x UUP, 1 x SDLP, 1 x Sinn Féin, 1 x Alliance
2001-2005 Change: Alliance gain from UUP

Antrim South East - 7 seats
Party	Candidate	FPv%	Count							
Party	Candidate	FPv%	1	2	3	4	5	6	7	8
SDLP	Thomas Burns*	19.96%	1,435							
DUP	Samuel Dunlop*	14.83%	1,066							
UUP	Danny Kinahan	12.57%	904							
UUP	Mervyn Rea*	11.03%	793	833.4	833.4	841.2	842.2	1,048.2		
DUP	Mel Lucas	8.39%	603	608.6	608.6	630.2	630.2	642.75	671.85	948.4
Sinn Féin	Anne-Marie Logue	6.29%	452	656.8	674.4	674.85	893.45	893.45	894.42	895.97
Alliance	Alan Lawther	8.32%	598	789.2	805.4	806.6	822.8	835.3	877.98	890.7
DUP	Roy Thompson*	7.13%	513	516.2	517.2	529.5	529.5	549.8	584.72	741.04
DUP	William Harkness*	4.30%	309	320.2	320.2	433.6	433.6	450.85	491.59	
UUP	Roderick Swann	3.77%	271	275.4	275.4	277.35	277.35			
Sinn Féin	Bernard McCrory	2.74%	197	248.2	256.4	256.4				
Independent	Patricia Murray	0.68%	49	62.2						
Electorate: 12,005 Valid: 7,190 (59.89%) Spoilt: 104 Quota: 899 Turnout: 7,294 (60.76%)

=== Antrim Town ===
2001: 3 x UUP, 2 x DUP, 2 x SDLP
2005: 3 x DUP, 2 x UUP, 1 x SDLP, 1 x Alliance
2001-2005 Change: DUP and Alliance gain from UUP and SDLP

Antrim Town - 7 seats
Party	Candidate	FPv%	Count						
Party	Candidate	FPv%	1	2	3	4	5	6	7
DUP	John Smyth*	13.33%	705						
UUP	Adrian Cochrane-Watson*	12.65%	669						
SDLP	Oran Keenan*	8.08%	427	427.06	434.12	684.12			
Alliance	David Ford	11.65%	616	616.66	626.72	680.72			
UUP	Andrew Ritchie	8.00%	423	425.52	485.12	489.12	490.47	791.47	
DUP	Brian Graham*	8.80%	465	484.86	537.28	538.28	538.58	579.36	658.41
DUP	Pam Lewis	9.06%	479	493.94	539.3	543.3	544.05	574.89	626.04
Sinn Féin	Gerard Magee	8.98%	475	475	490	518	534.65	539.1	539.1
UUP	Paul Michael*	7.02%	371	372.8	439.1	441.1	444.1		
SDLP	Brian Duffin	6.53%	345	345.06	356.06				
Independent	Darran Smyth	2.57%	136	136.9					
PUP	Ken Wilkinson	2.08%	110	110.66					
UUP	James Sands	0.72%	38	38.48					
Independent	Aine Gribbon	0.53%	28	28					
Electorate: 10,792 Valid: 5,287 (48.99%) Spoilt: 123 Quota: 661 Turnout: 5,410 (50.13%)
