= 2011 Antrim Borough Council election =

Local government election in Northern Ireland

- 5 May 2011

All 19 seats to Antrim Borough Council 10 seats needed for a majority
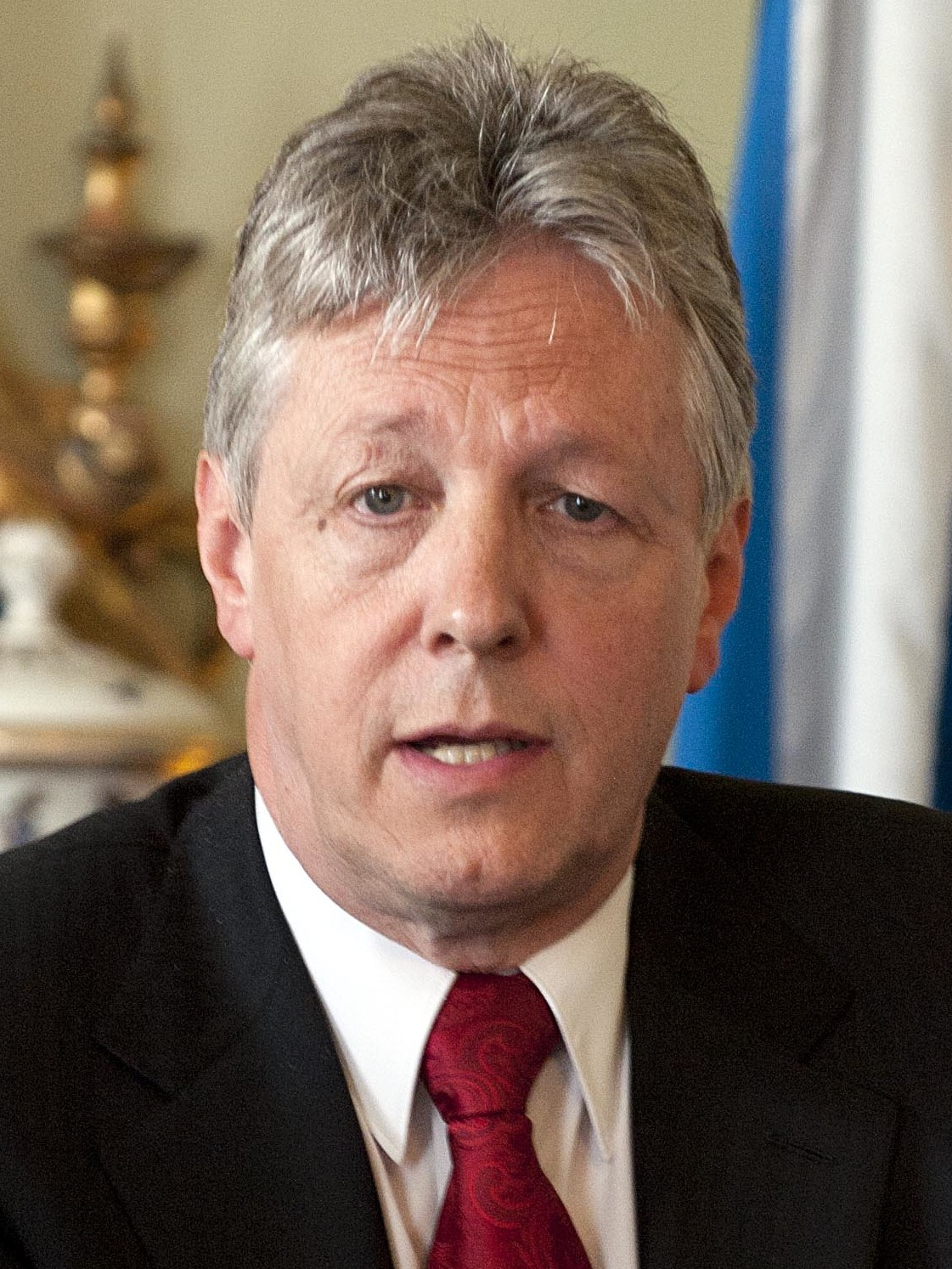

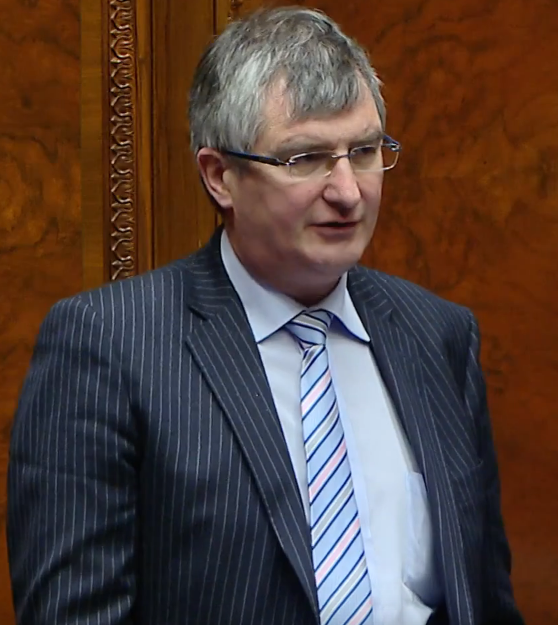

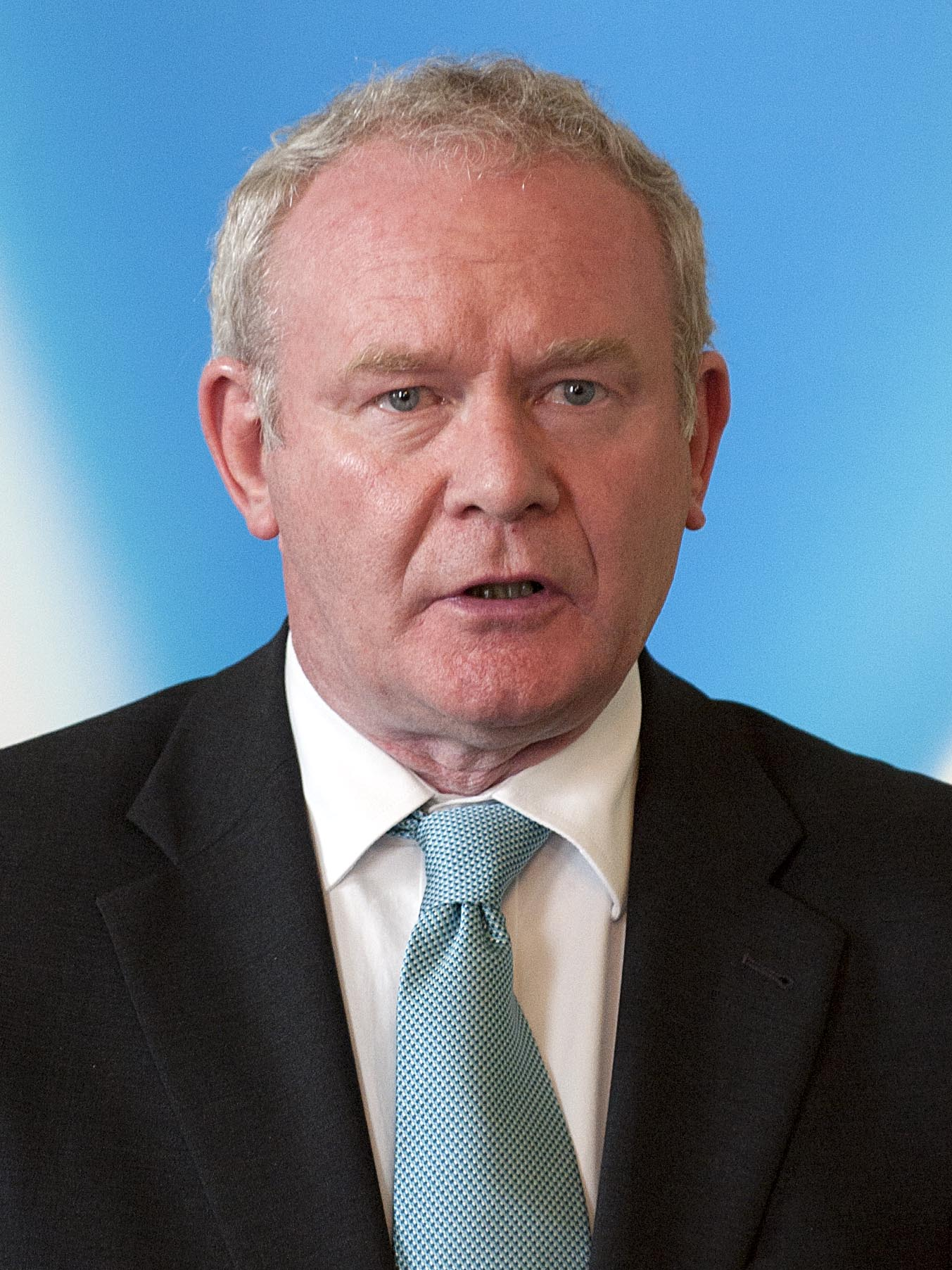

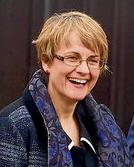

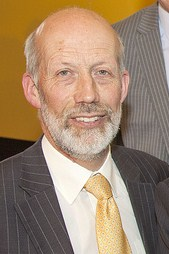
	First party	Second party	Third party
Leader	Peter Robinson	Tom Elliott	Martin McGuinness
Party	DUP	UUP	Sinn Féin
Seats won	5	5	4
Seat change	▼1	Steady	▲1
Percentage	30.6%	19.9%	17.2%
Swing	▼0.1%	▼3.9%	▲2.4%
	Fourth party	Fifth party
Leader	Margaret Ritchie	David Ford
Party	SDLP	Alliance
Seats won	3	2
Seat change	Steady	Steady
Percentage	16.5%	11.3%
Swing	▼4.0%	▲4.4%
- 2011 Antrim Council Election Results, shaded by plurality of First Preference Votes.

Elections to Antrim Borough Council were held on 5 May 2011 on the same day as the other Northern Irish local government elections. The election used three district electoral areas to elect a total of 19 councillors.

== Election results ==
Antrim Borough Council Election Result 2011
Party	Seats	Gains	Losses	Net gain/loss	Seats %	Votes %	Votes	+/−
DUP	5	0	1	▼1	26.3	30.6	5,210	▼0.1
UUP	5	0	0	0	26.3	19.9	3,391	▼3.9
Sinn Féin	4	1	0	▲1	21.1	17.2	2,931	▲2.4
SDLP	3	0	0	0	15.8	16.5	2,806	▼4.0
Alliance	2	0	0	0	10.5	11.3	1,919	▲4.4
TUV	0	0	0	0	0.0	2.1	363	New
Independent	0	0	0	0	0.0	1.9	321	▼0.8
PUP	0	0	0	0	0.0	0.6	109	0.0

Note: "Votes" are the first preference votes.

== Districts summary ==
Results of the Antrim Borough Council election, 2011 by district
Ward	%	Cllrs	%	Cllrs	%	Cllrs	%	Cllrs	%	Cllrs	%	Cllrs	Total Cllrs
Ward	DUP		UUP		Sinn Féin		SDLP		Alliance		Others		Total Cllrs
Antrim North West	30.9	1	10.4	1	29.0	2	24.6	1	5.1	0	0.0	0	5
Antrim South East	28.7	2	21.7	2	12.5	1	11.6	1	17.5	1	8.0	0	7
Antrim Town	32.9	2	26.4	2	12.4	1	16.7	1	7.2	1	4.4	0	7
Total	30.6	5	19.9	5	17.2	4	16.5	3	11.3	2	4.5	0	19

== Districts results ==
=== Antrim North West ===
2005: 2 x Sinn Féin, 1 x DUP, 1 x SDLP, 1 x UUP
2011: 2 x Sinn Féin, 1 x DUP, 1 x SDLP, 1 x UUP
2005-2011 Change: No change

Antrim North West - 5 seats
Party	Candidate	FPv%	Count						
Party	Candidate	FPv%	1	2	3	4	5	6	7
DUP	Trevor Clarke*	24.12%	1,172						
SDLP	Robert Loughran*	13.05%	634	648.57	715.19	1,150.19			
Sinn Féin	Anthony Brady*	15.19%	738	738.93	748.93	788.24	909.24		
Sinn Féin	Henry Cushinan*	13.79%	670	671.24	675.24	751.55	895.55		
UUP	Roderick Swann	10.41%	506	545.68	628.61	643.23	654.23	668.23	681.23
DUP	Wilson Clyde	6.77%	329	618.54	646.09	647.4	649.4	659.4	668.4
SDLP	Brian Duffin	11.58%	563	566.41	596.72				
Alliance	Pauline Savage	5.10%	248	252.65					
Electorate: 9,054 Valid: 4,860 (53.68%) Spoilt: 82 Quota: 811 Turnout: 4,942 (54.58%)

=== Antrim South East ===
2005: 2 x DUP, 2 x UUP, 1 x SDLP, 1 x Sinn Féin, 1 x Alliance
2011: 2 x DUP, 2 x UUP, 1 x SDLP, 1 x Sinn Féin, 1 x Alliance
2005-2011 Change: No change

Antrim South East - 7 seats
Party	Candidate	FPv%	Count					
Party	Candidate	FPv%	1	2	3	4	5	6
SDLP	Thomas Burns*	14.04%	992					
DUP	Samuel Dunlop*	12.36%	873					
Sinn Féin	Anne-Marie Logue*	12.53%	885					
UUP	Mervyn Rea*	12.08%	853	856.08	875.73	964.73		
Alliance	Alan Lawther*	11.57%	817	829.32	869.07	882.18	884.18	
DUP	Roy Thompson	10.91%	771	772.1	784.21	847.21	876.21	883.98
UUP	Paul Michael	9.61%	679	680.1	684.32	788.54	823.54	847.05
DUP	John Smyth	5.39%	381	381.22	389.33	447.44	459.44	475.3
SDLP	Róisín Nugent	3.50%	247	312.34	379.72	384.83	385.83	
TUV	Mel Lucas*	5.14%	363	363.66	365.88			
Independent	Martin Nelson	2.18%	154	166.1				
Independent	John Fox	0.69%	49	53.62				
Electorate: 13,628 Valid: 7,064 (51.83%) Spoilt: 101 Quota: 884 Turnout: 7,165 (52.58%)

=== Antrim Town ===
2005: 3 x DUP, 2 x UUP, 1 x Alliance, 1 x SDLP
2011: 2 x DUP, 2 x UUP, 1 x Alliance, 1 x Sinn Féin, 1 x SDLP
2005-2011 Change: Sinn Féin gain from DUP

Antrim Town - 7 seats
Party	Candidate	FPv%	Count							
Party	Candidate	FPv%	1	2	3	4	5	6	7	8
UUP	Adrian Cochrane-Watson*	17.25%	884							
DUP	Pam Lewis*	14.32%	734							
Sinn Féin	Noel Maguire	12.45%	638	638.56	638.56	639.56	655.56			
UUP	Andrew Ritchie*	7.80%	400	490.72	496.44	521.51	654.87			
Alliance	Neil Kelly	9.77%	501	509.4	512.65	517.65	546.18	847.18		
DUP	Brian Graham*	9.97%	511	536.48	585.1	602.2	618.62	622.9	651.9	
SDLP	Gráinne Teggart	7.22%	370	371.4	372.44	372.44	418.85	455.53	580.53	591.53
DUP	John Smyth*	8.56%	439	459.16	486.59	523.38	530.54	536.62	561.62	562.62
Alliance	Oran Keenan*	6.89%	353	356.92	357.57	360.57	381.53			
UUP	Amanda Johnston	1.35%	69	151.6	154.2	167.33				
Independent	Donovan McClelland	2.30%	118	119.4	120.18	121.18				
PUP	Ken Wilkinson	2.13%	109	113.48	115.04					
Electorate: 11,925 Valid: 5,126 (42.99%) Spoilt: 102 Quota: 641 Turnout: 5,228 (43.84%)
