= 1997 Antrim Borough Council election =

Local government election in Northern Ireland

← 1993	21 May 1997	2001 →

All 19 seats to Antrim Borough Council 10 seats needed for a majority
	First party	Second party	Third party
Party	UUP	SDLP	DUP
Seats won	9	4	3
Seat change	▲1	0	0
	Fourth party	Fifth party	Sixth party
Party	Alliance	Sinn Féin	Ind. Unionist
Seats won	2	1	0
Seat change	0	0	▼1
- Results by district electoral area, shaded by First Preference Votes.

Elections to Antrim Borough Council were held on 21 May 1997 on the same day as the other Northern Irish local government elections. The election used three district electoral areas to elect a total of 19 councillors.

== Election results ==
Antrim Borough Council Election Result 1997
Party	Seats	Gains	Losses	Net gain/loss	Seats %	Votes %	Votes	+/−
UUP	9	1	0	▲1	47.4	43.0	6,050	▲4.5
SDLP	4	0	0	0	21.1	26.0	3,632	▲5.0
DUP	3	0	0	0	15.8	16.0	2,205	▼0.3
Alliance	2	0	0	0	10.5	8.2	1,173	▼0.3
Sinn Féin	1	0	0	0	5.3	4.3	612	▼1.0
PUP	0	0	0	0	0.0	2.5	358	▲2.5

Note: "Votes" are the first preference votes.

== Districts summary ==
Results of the Antrim Borough Council election, 1997 by district
Ward	%	Cllrs	%	Cllrs	%	Cllrs	%	Cllrs	%	Cllrs	%	Cllrs	Total Cllrs
Ward	UUP		SDLP		DUP		Alliance		Sinn Féin		Others		Total Cllrs
Antrim North West	30.7	1	36.0	2	15.9	1	3.1	0	14.3	1	0.0	0	5
Antrim South East	48.4	4	19.6	1	15.2	1	10.6	1	0.0	0	6.2	0	7
Antrim Town	46.1	4	22.7	1	15.4	1	10.2	1	0.0	0	5.6	0	7
Total	43.0	9	26.0	4	16.0	3	8.2	2	4.3	1	2.5	0	19

== District results ==
=== Antrim North West ===
1993: 2 x SDLP, 1 x Sinn Féin, 1 x DUP, 1 x UUP
1997: 2 x SDLP, 1 x Sinn Féin, 1 x DUP, 1 x UUP
1993-1997 Change: No change

Antrim North West - 5 seats
Party	Candidate	FPv%	Count				
Party	Candidate	FPv%	1	2	3	4	5
SDLP	Robert Loughran*	25.99%	1,115				
UUP	James Graham*	24.78%	1,063				
SDLP	Donovan McClelland*	10.02%	430	774.1			
DUP	Wilson Clyde*	15.92%	683	685.96	767.14		
Sinn Féin	Henry Cushinan*	14.27%	612	644.56	644.56	655.41	708.21
UUP	Avril Swann	5.92%	254	257.7	508.5	594.46	597.32
Alliance	George Picken	3.10%	133	147.8	159.02		
Electorate: 8,059 Valid: 4,290 (53.23%) Spoilt: 90 Quota: 716 Turnout: 4,380 (54.35%)

=== Antrim South East ===
1993: 3 x UUP, 1 x DUP, 1 x SDLP, 1 x Alliance, 1 x Independent Unionist
1997: 4 x UUP, 1 x DUP, 1 x SDLP, 1 x Alliance
1993-1997 Change: Independent Unionist joins UUP

Antrim South East - 7 seats
Party	Candidate	FPv%	Count								
Party	Candidate	FPv%	1	2	3	4	5	6	7	8	9
UUP	Roy Thompson*	17.18%	996								
SDLP	Thomas Burns	16.61%	963								
UUP	Edgar Wallace*	13.16%	763								
UUP	Mervyn Rea*	12.35%	716	818.87							
Alliance	David Ford*	10.58%	613	621.91	642.91	643.69	656.02	659.62	693.73	796.73	
DUP	Samuel Dunlop*	8.54%	495	509.85	512.35	517.03	526.5	530.1	613.56	617.56	621.56
UUP	Roderick Swann	3.11%	180	242.37	242.37	270.45	433.17	458.47	547.18	558.18	565.18
DUP	William Harkness	6.64%	385	416.59	417.84	433.96	441.95	444.15	508.29	517.79	519.79
SDLP	Lucia Trowlen	3.05%	177	178.08	386.08	386.34	386.34	386.34	392.34		
PUP	Ken Wilkinson	6.18%	358	367.99	368.99	371.85	380.64	381.54			
UUP	Roy Stinson	2.59%	150	181.86	182.11	221.89					
Electorate: 12,301 Valid: 5,796 (47.12%) Spoilt: 76 Quota: 725 Turnout: 5,872 (47.74%)

=== Antrim Town ===
1993: 4 x UUP, 1 x DUP, 1 x SDLP, 1 x Alliance
1997: 4 x UUP, 1 x DUP, 1 x SDLP, 1 x Alliance
1993-1997 Change: No change

Antrim Town - 7 seats
Party	Candidate	FPv%	Count								
Party	Candidate	FPv%	1	2	3	4	5	6	7	8	9
UUP	Paddy Marks*	25.51%	1,066								
DUP	Robert McClay	15.36%	642								
UUP	Andrew Ritchie*	6.87%	287	646.04							
SDLP	Oran Keenan*	12.30%	514	516.04	516.04	516.24	520.75	531.75			
UUP	Andrew Thompson*	5.22%	218	314.39	410.95	479.55	495.72	504.18	562.18		
UUP	Adrian Cochrane-Watson	8.54%	357	410.04	427.38	464.38	474.03	485.18	524.24		
Alliance	James McConnell*	6.41%	268	279.73	281.09	282.69	292.4	412.2	458.8	467.8	470.71
SDLP	Sean McKee	10.36%	433	436.06	436.23	436.43	437.43	446.43	458.43	460.43	466.25
Independent	Maurice Lynn	2.97%	124	126.55	127.06	130.06	193.19	202.1			
Alliance	Mary Wallace	3.80%	159	167.16	169.03	170.63	178.05				
Independent	Samuel Greer	2.66%	111	115.59	116.44	121.24					
Electorate: 11,780 Valid: 4,179 (35.48%) Spoilt: 92 Quota: 523 Turnout: 4,271 (36.26%)
