= 1989 Antrim Borough Council election =

Local government election in Northern Ireland

← 1985	17 May 1989	1993 →

All 19 seats to Antrim Borough Council 10 seats needed for a majority
	First party	Second party	Third party
Party	UUP	DUP	SDLP
Seats won	10	4	4
Seat change	▲1	▼1	▲1
	Fourth party	Fifth party
Party	Alliance	Sinn Féin
Seats won	1	0
Seat change	0	▼1

Elections to Antrim Borough Council were held on 17 May 1989 on the same day as the other Northern Irish local government elections. The election used three district electoral areas to elect a total of 19 councillors.

== Election results ==
Antrim Borough Council Election Result 1989
Party	Seats	Gains	Losses	Net gain/loss	Seats %	Votes %	Votes	+/−
UUP	10	1	0	▲1	52.6	43.7	6,572	▲4.0
DUP	4	0	1	▼1	21.1	24.0	3,609	▼4.4
SDLP	4	1	0	▲1	21.1	18.1	2,723	▲0.3
Alliance	1	0	0	0	5.3	7.0	1,068	▼0.6
Sinn Féin	0	0	1	▼1	0.0	5.6	839	▲1.1
Workers' Party	0	0	0	0	0.0	1.1	158	▲0.7
Ind. Unionist	0	0	0	0	0.0	0.5	75	▲0.5

Note: "Votes" are the first preference votes.

== Districts summary ==
Results of the Antrim Borough Council election, 1989 by district
Ward	%	Cllrs	%	Cllrs	%	Cllrs	%	Cllrs	%	Cllrs	%	Cllrs	Total Cllrs
Ward	UUP		DUP		SDLP		Alliance		Sinn Féin		Others		Total Cllrs
Antrim North West	36.0	2	18.6	1	30.9	2	0.0	0	14.5	0	0.0	0	5
Antrim South East	47.0	4	31.7	2	12.4	1	8.9	0	0.0	0	0.0	0	7
Antrim Town	47.2	4	18.7	1	12.4	1	12.3	1	4.0	0	5.4	0	7
Total	43.7	10	24.0	4	18.1	4	7.0	1	5.6	0	1.6	0	19

== District results ==
=== Antrim North West ===
1985: 2 x UUP, 1 x SDLP, 1 x DUP, 1 x Sinn Féin
1989: 2 x SDLP, 2 x UUP, 1 x DUP
1985-1989 Change: SDLP gain from Sinn Féin

Antrim North West - 5 seats
Party	Candidate	FPv%	Count				
Party	Candidate	FPv%	1	2	3	4	5
UUP	James Graham*	29.85%	1,374				
SDLP	Robert Loughran*	22.14%	1,019				
DUP	Wilson Clyde*	18.57%	855				
UUP	Roderick Swann	6.13%	282	875.55			
SDLP	Donovan McClelland*	8.80%	405	407.7	643.52	728.12	784.12
Sinn Féin	Henry Cushinan*	14.51%	668	669.35	684.43	686.23	693.23
Electorate: 7,570 Valid: 4,603 (60.81%) Spoilt: 98 Quota: 768 Turnout: 4,701 (62.10%)

=== Antrim South East ===
1985: 4 x UUP, 2 x DUP, 1 x SDLP
1989: 4 x UUP, 2 x DUP, 1 x SDLP
1985-1989 Change: No change

Antrim South East - 7 seats
Party	Candidate	FPv%	Count						
Party	Candidate	FPv%	1	2	3	4	5	6	7
DUP	Roy Thompson*	20.31%	1,248						
UUP	Edgar Wallace*	16.97%	1,043						
UUP	Mervyn Rea*	14.26%	876						
UUP	Howard Campbell*	11.18%	687	750.18	839.62				
SDLP	Robert Burns*	12.43%	764	765.56	765.82	767.12	767.56	787.56	
DUP	Samuel Dunlop*	8.01%	492	648	664.38	672.31	680.89	684.89	843.89
UUP	Roy Stinson*	4.62%	284	325.73	466.13	548.68	602.36	604.71	771.09
Alliance	David Ford	4.87%	299	300.95	307.71	309.79	311.55	520.11	525.45
DUP	James Simpson	3.42%	210	417.09	426.97	435.94	440.12	442.51	
Alliance	Theresa Gallagher	3.94%	242	243.17	243.95	244.6	245.04		
Electorate: 11,349 Valid: 6,145 (54.15%) Spoilt: 166 Quota: 769 Turnout: 6,311 (55.61%)

=== Antrim Town ===
1985: 3 x UUP, 2 x DUP, 1 x SDLP, 1 x Alliance
1989: 4 x UUP, 1 x DUP, 1 x SDLP, 1 x Alliance
1985-1989 Change: UUP gain from DUP

Antrim Town - 7 seats
Party	Candidate	FPv%	Count								
Party	Candidate	FPv%	1	2	3	4	5	6	7	8	9
UUP	Jack Allen*	21.11%	907								
UUP	Paddy Marks*	17.25%	741								
DUP	James Brown	14.06%	604								
SDLP	Oran Keenan*	12.52%	535	537.46	538.58						
Alliance	James McConnell*	8.26%	355	364.43	368.91	377.73	378.06	388.06	536.21	619.21	
UUP	Avril Swann	3.12%	134	330.8	433.56	466.13	469.32	473.32	475.32	491.47	501.47
UUP	Andrew Thompson	5.68%	244	324.77	386.65	396	398.64	398.64	399.64	402.05	405.05
DUP	James Graham	4.66%	200	248.38	269.1	284.2	342.83	342.83	343.8	352.03	358.03
Workers' Party	Eamon Gillen	3.68%	158	162.51	163.91	179.91	180.35	253.35	275.35		
Alliance	Peter Kelly	4.00%	172	176.51	178.19	181.19	181.41	202.41			
Sinn Féin	Paul Little	3.98%	171	171	171.28	171.28	171.28				
Independent	James Millar	1.75%	75	89.76	97.04						
Electorate: 9,883 Valid: 4,296 (43.47%) Spoilt: 141 Quota: 538 Turnout: 4,437 (44.90%)
