= 1993 Antrim Borough Council election =

Local government election in Northern Ireland

← 1989	19 May 1993	1997 →

All 19 seats to Antrim Borough Council 10 seats needed for a majority
	First party	Second party	Third party
Party	UUP	SDLP	DUP
Seats won	8	4	3
Seat change	▼2	0	▼1
	Fourth party	Fifth party	Sixth party
Party	Alliance	Sinn Féin	Ind. Unionist
Seats won	2	1	1
Seat change	▲1	▲1	▲1
- Party with the most votes by district.

Elections to Antrim Borough Council were held on 19 May 1993 on the same day as the other Northern Irish local government elections. The election used three district electoral areas to elect a total of 19 councillors.

== Election results ==
Antrim Borough Council Election Result 1993
Party	Seats	Gains	Losses	Net gain/loss	Seats %	Votes %	Votes	+/−
UUP	8	0	2	▼2	42.1	38.5	5,701	▼5.2
SDLP	4	0	0	0	21.1	21.0	3,108	▲2.9
DUP	3	0	1	▼1	15.8	16.3	2,412	▼7.7
Alliance	2	0	0	▲1	10.5	8.5	1,250	▲1.5
Ind. Unionist	1	1	0	▲1	5.3	8.7	1,280	▲8.2
Sinn Féin	1	1	0	▲1	5.3	4.3	612	▼1.0
Democratic Left	0	0	0	0	0.0	1.2	179	New
Workers' Party	0	0	0	0	0.0	0.5	82	▼0.6

Note: "Votes" are the first preference votes.

== Districts summary ==
Results of the Antrim Borough Council election, 1993 by district
Ward	%	Cllrs	%	Cllrs	%	Cllrs	%	Cllrs	%	Cllrs	%	Cllrs	Total Cllrs
Ward	UUP		SDLP		DUP		Alliance		Sinn Féin		Others		Total Cllrs
Antrim North West	32.6	1	36.1	2	17.0	1	0.0	0	14.3	1	0.0	0	5
Antrim South East	35.0	3	14.6	1	16.3	1	9.6	1	2.6	0	21.9	1	7
Antrim Town	48.7	4	14.7	1	15.6	1	15.2	1	0.0	0	5.8	0	7
Total	38.5	8	21.0	4	16.3	3	8.5	2	5.3	1	10.4	1	19

== District results ==
=== Antrim North West ===
1989: 2 x SDLP, 1 x UUP, 1 x DUP
1993: 2 x SDLP, 1 x UUP, 1 x DUP, 1 x Sinn Féin
1989-1993 Change: Sinn Féin gain from UUP

Antrim North West - 5 seats
Party	Candidate	FPv%	Count				
Party	Candidate	FPv%	1	2	3	4	5
UUP	James Graham*	26.53%	1,167				
SDLP	Robert Loughran*	26.17%	1,151				
DUP	Wilson Clyde*	16.98%	747				
SDLP	Donovan McClelland*	9.93%	437	441.18	818.9		
Sinn Féin	Henry Cushinan	14.28%	628	628	656.12	723.95	723.99
UUP	Roderick Swann*	6.12%	269	692.7	700.68	714.17	721.09
Electorate: 7,627 Valid: 4,399 (57.68%) Spoilt: 131 Quota: 734 Turnout: 4,530 (59.39%)

=== Antrim South East ===
1989: 4 x UUP, 2 x DUP, 1 x SDLP
1993: 3 x UUP, 1 x DUP, 1 x SDLP, 1 x Alliance, 1 x Independent Unionist
1989-1993 Change: Alliance gain from UUP, Independent Unionist leaves DUP

Antrim South East - 7 seats
Party	Candidate	FPv%	Count					
Party	Candidate	FPv%	1	2	3	4	5	6
Ind. Unionist	Roy Thompson*	21.85%	1,280					
UUP	Edgar Wallace*	14.99%	878					
SDLP	Robert Burns*	14.60%	855					
UUP	Mervyn Rea*	9.32%	546	702.64	739.44			
Alliance	David Ford	9.58%	561	571.56	576.04	638.04	739.02	
UUP	Howard Campbell*	7.38%	432	517.8	541.48	546.48	557.53	767.29
DUP	Samuel Dunlop*	9.56%	560	638.76	645.16	647.16	648.35	679.23
DUP	William Harkness	6.76%	396	486.64	494.16	494.16	495.86	526.34
UUP	Roy Stinson*	3.40%	199	319.12	378.96	378.96	379.81	
Sinn Féin	Joseph McCavana	2.56%	150	150	150			
Electorate: 11,431 Valid: 5,857 (51.24%) Spoilt: 128 Quota: 733 Turnout: 5,985 (52.36%)

=== Antrim Town ===
1989: 4 x UUP, 1 x DUP, 1 x SDLP, 1 x Alliance
1993: 4 x UUP, 1 x DUP, 1 x SDLP, 1 x Alliance
1989-1993 Change: No change

Antrim Town - 7 seats
Party	Candidate	FPv%	Count								
Party	Candidate	FPv%	1	2	3	4	5	6	7	8	9
UUP	Paddy Marks*	17.45%	791								
UUP	Jack Allen*	15.86%	719								
SDLP	Oran Keenan*	14.67%	665								
DUP	James Brown*	12.31%	558	570.76							
UUP	Andrew Ritchie	6.57%	298	398.05	472.81	473.61	475.82	548.8	557.01	638.01	
Alliance	James McConnell*	8.80%	399	405.38	413.15	448.03	473.51	476.01	525.08	531.08	532.08
UUP	Andrew Thompson*	5.56%	252	291.73	312.52	312.68	312.68	341.6	343.76	461.13	516.13
Alliance	Mary Wallace	6.40%	290	292.9	295.63	328.27	355.03	358.03	435.51	448.46	450.46
UUP	Avril Swann*	3.31%	150	202.2	224.25	224.25	224.25	248.3	252.93		
Democratic Left	Patrick McGinley	3.95%	179	180.16	181.42	192.14	217.62	219.83			
DUP	James Porter	3.33%	151	158.54	174.5	174.66	175.66				
Workers' Party	Eamon Gillen	1.81%	82	82	83.47	100.75					
Electorate: 11,484 Valid: 4,534 (39.48%) Spoilt: 131 Quota: 567 Turnout: 4,665 (40.62%)
