= 2001 Antrim Borough Council election =

Local government election in Northern Ireland

← 1997	7 June 2001	2005 →

All 19 seats to Antrim Borough Council 10 seats needed for a majority
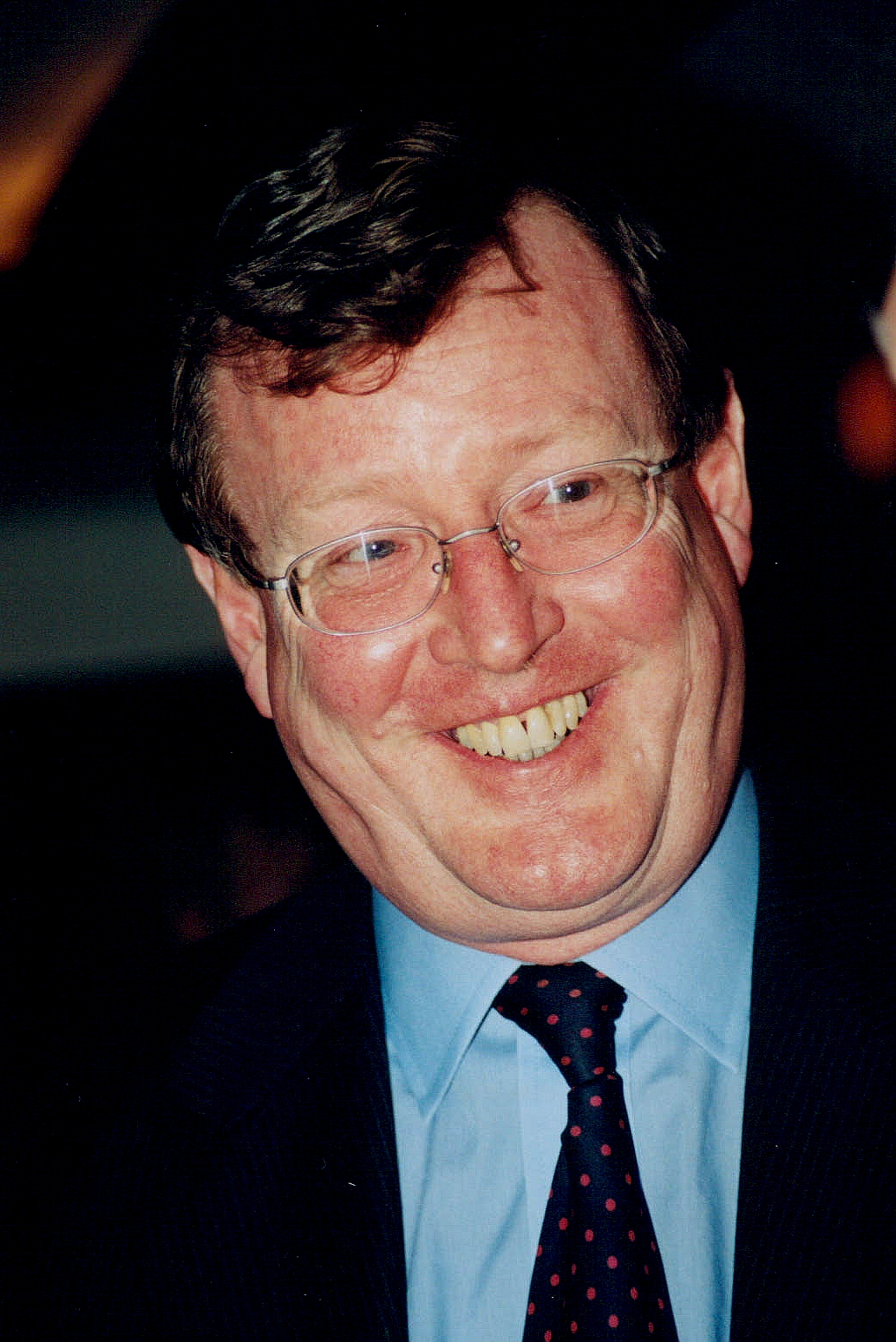

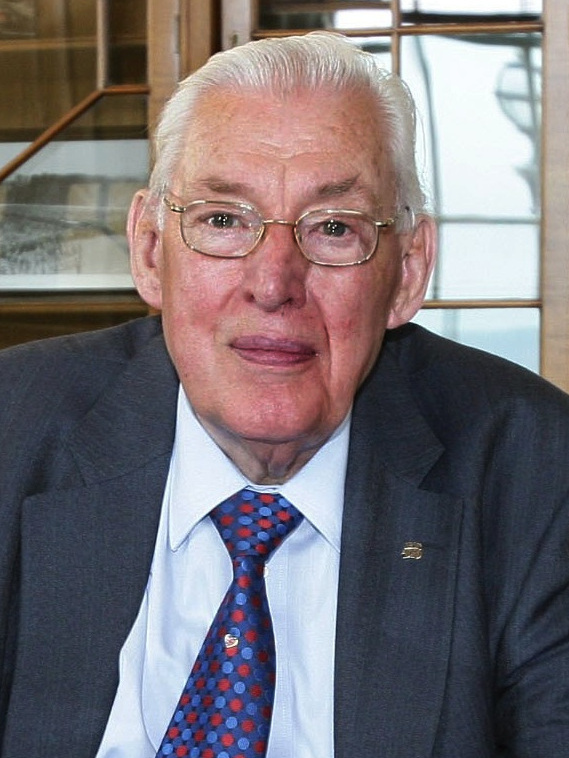

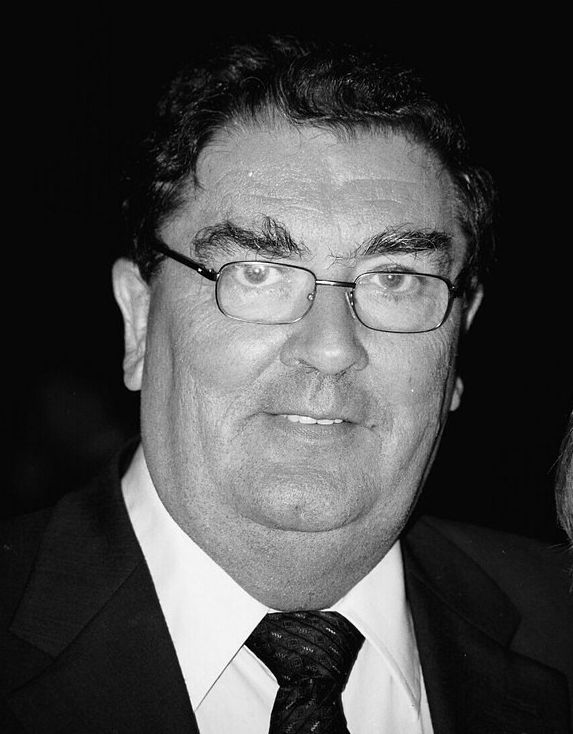

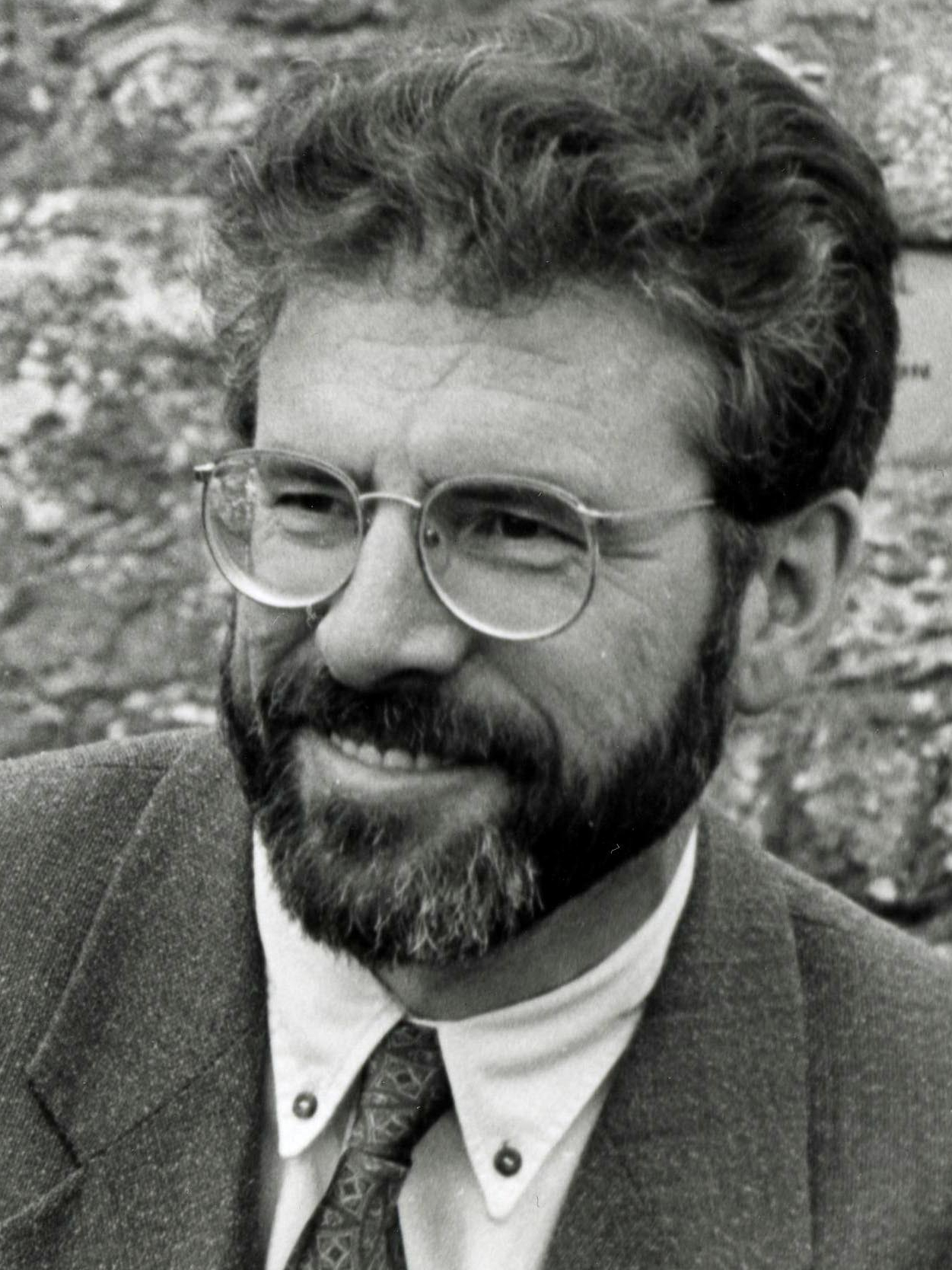

	First party	Second party	Third party
Leader	David Trimble	Ian Paisley	John Hume
Party	UUP	DUP	SDLP
Seats won	7	5	5
Seat change	▼2	▲2	▲1
Percentage	33.0%	22.5%	21.0%
Swing	▼10.0%	▲6.5%	▼5.0%
	Fourth party	Fifth party
Leader	Gerry Adams	Seán Neeson
Party	Sinn Féin	Alliance
Seats won	2	0
Seat change	▲1	▼2
Percentage	12.5%	5.5%
Swing	▲8.2%	▼2.7%
- 2001 Antrim Council Election Results, shaded by First Preference Votes.

Elections to Antrim Borough Council were held on 7 June 2001 on the same day as the other Northern Irish local government elections. The election used three district electoral areas to elect a total of 19 councillors.

== Election results ==
Antrim Borough Council Election Result 2001
Party	Seats	Gains	Losses	Net gain/loss	Seats %	Votes %	Votes	+/−
UUP	7	0	2	▼2	36.8	33.0	6,699	▼10.0
DUP	5	2	0	▲2	26.3	22.5	4,576	▲6.5
SDLP	5	1	0	▲1	26.3	21.0	4,254	▼5.0
Sinn Féin	2	1	0	▲1	10.5	12.5	2,589	▲8.2
Alliance	0	0	2	▼2	0.0	5.5	1,117	▼2.7
Independent	0	0	0	0	0.0	3.1	628	▲3.1
NI Unionist	0	0	0	0	0.0	2.0	413	New
PUP	0	0	0	0	0.0	0.8	197	▼1.7

Note: "Votes" are the first preference votes.

== Districts summary ==
Results of the Antrim Borough Council election, 2001 by district
Ward	%	Cllrs	%	Cllrs	%	Cllrs	%	Cllrs	%	Cllrs	%	Cllrs	Total Cllrs
Ward	UUP		DUP		SDLP		Sinn Féin		Alliance		Others		Total Cllrs
Antrim North West	18.2	1	18.0	1	30.4	2	24.0	1	2.3	0	7.1	0	5
Antrim South East	40.4	3	23.4	2	15.4	1	8.7	1	7.2	0	4.9	0	7
Antrim Town	37.5	3	25.7	2	19.5	2	7.8	0	6.4	0	3.1	0	7
Total	33.0	7	22.5	5	21.0	5	12.5	2	5.5	0	5.5	0	19

== Districts results ==
=== Antrim North West ===
1997: 2 x SDLP, 1 x Sinn Féin, 1 x DUP, 1 x UUP
2001: 2 x SDLP, 1 x Sinn Féin, 1 x DUP, 1 x UUP
1997-2001 Change: No change

Antrim North West - 5 seats
Party	Candidate	FPv%	Count							
Party	Candidate	FPv%	1	2	3	4	5	6	7	8
SDLP	Robert Loughran*	18.78%	1,093							
DUP	Wilson Clyde*	18.09%	1,053							
Sinn Féin	Martin Meehan	17.30%	1,007							
SDLP	Donovan McClelland*	11.65%	678	725	822.35	822.75	1,027.75			
UUP	Stephen Nicholl	7.39%	430	465	466.32	489.6	493.26	515.26	793.52	822.92
UUP	Avril Swann	10.81%	629	659	660.65	677.05	677.16	680.16	786.49	792.44
NI Unionist	Brian Johnston	7.10%	413	420	420.99	456.99	459.98	472.98		
Sinn Féin	Joseph McCavana	6.60%	384	384	396.32	396.48				
Alliance	Michael Donoghue	2.29%	133							
Electorate: 8,544 Valid: 5,820 (68.12%) Spoilt: 109 Quota: 971 Turnout: 5,929 (69.39%)

=== Antrim South East ===
1997: 4 x UUP, 1 x DUP, 1 x SDLP, 1 x Alliance
2001: 3 x UUP, 2 x DUP, 1 x SDLP, 1 x Sinn Féin
1997-2001 Change: DUP and Sinn Féin gain from UUP and Alliance

Antrim South East - 7 seats
Party	Candidate	FPv%	Count								
Party	Candidate	FPv%	1	2	3	4	5	6	7	8	9
DUP	Samuel Dunlop*	16.96%	1,367								
SDLP	Thomas Burns*	13.30%	1,072								
UUP	Roy Thompson*	13.18%	1,062								
UUP	Mervyn Rea*	12.92%	1,042								
UUP	Edgar Wallace*	11.63%	937	951.31	951.73	980.38	986.41	989.07	1,142.07		
DUP	William Harkness	6.51%	525	853.86	854.76	861.46	862.93	864.11	893.21	931.07	980.07
Sinn Féin	Martin McManus	8.72%	703	703	707.68	707.68	707.71	777.27	778.3	907.52	907.52
Alliance	Alison McCartney	7.17%	578	580.97	582.65	583.9	584.77	668.69	697.18	831.19	877.19
Independent	Michael McGivern	4.88%	393	393.54	398.88	399.58	399.97	434.72	439.95		
UUP	Roderick Swann*	2.64%	213	223.53	223.95	237.65	259.04	263.85			
SDLP	Sean Mallon	2.08%	168	168.81	218.85	219	219.18				
Electorate: 12,770 Valid: 8,060 (63.12%) Spoilt: 197 Quota: 1,008 Turnout: 8,257 (64.66%)

=== Antrim Town ===
1997: 4 x UUP, 1 x DUP, 1 x SDLP, 1 x Alliance
2001: 3 x UUP, 2 x DUP, 2 x SDLP
1997-2001 Change: DUP and SDLP gain from UUP and Alliance

Antrim Town - 7 seats
Party	Candidate	FPv%	Count								
Party	Candidate	FPv%	1	2	3	4	5	6	7	8	9
UUP	Paddy Marks*	15.98%	1,016								
DUP	John Smyth	11.78%	749	759.56	799.56						
UUP	Adrian Cochrane-Watson*	9.94%	632	695.14	721.36	812.36					
DUP	Brian Graham	8.12%	516	521.28	532.28	542.7	543.58	847.58			
UUP	Paul Michael	7.39%	470	529.18	566.4	751.86	766.6	808.6			
SDLP	Sean McKee	9.94%	632	635.96	642.96	646.62	646.84	648.84	651.36	651.36	778.36
SDLP	Oran Keenan*	9.61%	611	614.52	617.74	620.84	621.06	623.06	625.58	625.58	726.58
Sinn Féin	Aine Gribbon	7.79%	495	495.44	500.44	500.44	500.66	501.66	501.66	501.66	517.66
Alliance	Pete Whitcroft	6.39%	406	411.06	420.06	429.36	429.8	439.44	486.48	491.48	
DUP	Robert McClay*	5.76%	366	373.26	391.7	408.12	408.56				
UUP	Andrew Ritchie*	4.22%	268	325.42	344.08						
PUP	Ken Wilkinson	3.10%	197	199.42							
Electorate: 11,616 Valid: 6,358 (54.73%) Spoilt: 195 Quota: 795 Turnout: 6,553 (56.41%)
