= Antrim South East (District Electoral Area) =

District electoral areas in Antrim, Northern Ireland

Antrim South East DEA (1993-2014) within Antrim

Antrim South East was one of the three district electoral areas in Antrim, Northern Ireland which existed from 1985 to 2014. The district elected seven members to Antrim Borough Council and formed part of the South Antrim constituencies for the Northern Ireland Assembly and UK Parliament.

It was created for the 1985 local elections, replacing Antrim Area B which had existed since 1973, and contained the wards of Aldergrove, Ballycraigy, Clady, Crumlin, Greystone, New Park and Templepatrick. For the 1993 local elections, it lost Greystone to Antrim DEA but gained Parkgate. It was abolished for the 2014 local elections and most of the area was transferred to the new Airport DEA.

== Councillors ==
| Election | Councillor (party) | | Councillor (party) | | Councillor (party) | Councillor (party) | | Councillor (party) | Councillor (party) | Councillor (party) | 2011 | Thomas Burns (SDLP) | Anne-Marie Logue (Sinn Féin) | Alan Lawther (Alliance) | Paul Michael (UUP) | Mervyn Rea (UUP) | Roy Thompson (DUP) | Samuel Dunlop (DUP) |
| 2005 | Danny Kinahan (UUP) | Mel Lucas (DUP) | | | | | | | | | | Thomas Burns (SDLP) | Anne-Marie Logue (Sinn Féin) | Alan Lawther (Alliance) | | Mervyn Rea (UUP) | | Samuel Dunlop (DUP) |
| 2001 | Martin McManus (Sinn Féin) | | Roy Thompson (UUP)/ (Independent Unionist)/ (DUP) | Edgar Wallace (UUP) | William Harkness (DUP) | | | | | | | Thomas Burns (SDLP) | | | | Mervyn Rea (UUP) | | Samuel Dunlop (DUP) |
| 1997 | | | Roy Thompson (UUP)/ (Independent Unionist)/ (DUP) | Edgar Wallace (UUP) | David Ford (Alliance) | Roderick Swann (UUP) | | | | | | Thomas Burns (SDLP) | | | | Mervyn Rea (UUP) | | Samuel Dunlop (DUP) |
| 1993 | | Robert Burns (SDLP) | Roy Thompson (UUP)/ (Independent Unionist)/ (DUP) | Edgar Wallace (UUP) | David Ford (Alliance) | | Howard Campbell (UUP) | | | | | | | | | Mervyn Rea (UUP) | | Samuel Dunlop (DUP) |
| 1989 | | Robert Burns (SDLP) | Roy Thompson (UUP)/ (Independent Unionist)/ (DUP) | Edgar Wallace (UUP) | Roy Stinson (UUP) | | Howard Campbell (UUP) | | | | | | | | | Mervyn Rea (UUP) | | Samuel Dunlop (DUP) |
| 1985 | | Robert Burns (SDLP) | Roy Thompson (UUP)/ (Independent Unionist)/ (DUP) | Edgar Wallace (UUP) | Carol Cunningham (UUP) | | Howard Campbell (UUP) | | | | | | | | | Mervyn Rea (UUP) | | Samuel Dunlop (DUP) |

== 2011 election ==
2005: 2 x DUP, 2 x UUP, 1 x SDLP, 1 x Sinn Féin, 1 x Alliance

2011: 2 x DUP, 2 x UUP, 1 x SDLP, 1 x Sinn Féin, 1 x Alliance

2005-2011 change: No change

Antrim South East - 7 seats
| Party | Candidate | FPv% | Count | | | | | |
| Party | Candidate | FPv% | 1 | 2 | 3 | 4 | 5 | 6 |
|---|---|---|---|---|---|---|---|---|
| SDLP | Thomas Burns* | 14.04% | 992 | | | | | |
| DUP | Samuel Dunlop* | 12.36% | 873 | | | | | |
| Sinn Féin | Anne-Marie Logue* | 12.53% | 885 | | | | | |
| UUP | Mervyn Rea* | 12.08% | 853 | 856.08 | 875.73 | 964.73 | | |
| Alliance | Alan Lawther* | 11.57% | 817 | 829.32 | 869.07 | 882.18 | 884.18 | |
| DUP | Roy Thompson | 10.91% | 771 | 772.1 | 784.21 | 847.21 | 876.21 | 883.98 |
| UUP | Paul Michael | 9.61% | 679 | 680.1 | 684.32 | 788.54 | 823.54 | 847.05 |
| DUP | John Smyth | 5.39% | 381 | 381.22 | 389.33 | 447.44 | 459.44 | 475.3 |
| SDLP | Róisín Nugent | 3.50% | 247 | 312.34 | 379.72 | 384.83 | 385.83 | |
| TUV | Mel Lucas* | 5.14% | 363 | 363.66 | 365.88 | | | |
| Independent | Martin Nelson | 2.18% | 154 | 166.1 | | | | |
| Independent | John Fox | 0.69% | 49 | 53.62 | | | | |
Electorate: 13,628 Valid: 7,064 (51.83%) Spoilt: 101 Quota: 884 Turnout: 7,165 (52.58%)

== 2005 election ==
2001: 3 x UUP, 2 x DUP, 1 x SDLP, 1 x Sinn Féin

2005: 2 x DUP, 2 x UUP, 1 x SDLP, 1 x Sinn Féin, 1 x Alliance

2001-2005 change: Alliance gain from UUP

Antrim South East - 7 seats
| Party | Candidate | FPv% | Count | | | | | | | |
| Party | Candidate | FPv% | 1 | 2 | 3 | 4 | 5 | 6 | 7 | 8 |
|---|---|---|---|---|---|---|---|---|---|---|
| SDLP | Thomas Burns* | 19.96% | 1,435 | | | | | | | |
| DUP | Samuel Dunlop* | 14.83% | 1,066 | | | | | | | |
| UUP | Danny Kinahan | 12.57% | 904 | | | | | | | |
| UUP | Mervyn Rea* | 11.03% | 793 | 833.4 | 833.4 | 841.2 | 842.2 | 1,048.2 | | |
| DUP | Mel Lucas | 8.39% | 603 | 608.6 | 608.6 | 630.2 | 630.2 | 642.75 | 671.85 | 948.4 |
| Sinn Féin | Anne-Marie Logue | 6.29% | 452 | 656.8 | 674.4 | 674.85 | 893.45 | 893.45 | 894.42 | 895.97 |
| Alliance | Alan Lawther | 8.32% | 598 | 789.2 | 805.4 | 806.6 | 822.8 | 835.3 | 877.98 | 890.7 |
| DUP | Roy Thompson* | 7.13% | 513 | 516.2 | 517.2 | 529.5 | 529.5 | 549.8 | 584.72 | 741.04 |
| DUP | William Harkness* | 4.30% | 309 | 320.2 | 320.2 | 433.6 | 433.6 | 450.85 | 491.59 | |
| UUP | Roderick Swann | 3.77% | 271 | 275.4 | 275.4 | 277.35 | 277.35 | | | |
| Sinn Féin | Bernard McCrory | 2.74% | 197 | 248.2 | 256.4 | 256.4 | | | | |
| Independent | Patricia Murray | 0.68% | 49 | 62.2 | | | | | | |
Electorate: 12,005 Valid: 7,190 (59.89%) Spoilt: 104 Quota: 899 Turnout: 7,294 (60.76%)

== 2001 election ==
1997: 4 x UUP, 1 x DUP, 1 x SDLP, 1 x Alliance

2001: 3 x UUP, 2 x DUP, 1 x SDLP, 1 x Sinn Féin

1997-2001 change: DUP and Sinn Féin gain from UUP and Alliance

Antrim South East - 7 seats
| Party | Candidate | FPv% | Count | | | | | | | | |
| Party | Candidate | FPv% | 1 | 2 | 3 | 4 | 5 | 6 | 7 | 8 | 9 |
|---|---|---|---|---|---|---|---|---|---|---|---|
| DUP | Samuel Dunlop* | 16.96% | 1,367 | | | | | | | | |
| SDLP | Thomas Burns* | 13.30% | 1,072 | | | | | | | | |
| UUP | Roy Thompson* | 13.18% | 1,062 | | | | | | | | |
| UUP | Mervyn Rea* | 12.92% | 1,042 | | | | | | | | |
| UUP | Edgar Wallace* | 11.63% | 937 | 951.31 | 951.73 | 980.38 | 986.41 | 989.07 | 1,142.07 | | |
| DUP | William Harkness | 6.51% | 525 | 853.86 | 854.76 | 861.46 | 862.93 | 864.11 | 893.21 | 931.07 | 980.07 |
| Sinn Féin | Martin McManus | 8.72% | 703 | 703 | 707.68 | 707.68 | 707.71 | 777.27 | 778.3 | 907.52 | 907.52 |
| Alliance | Alison McCartney | 7.17% | 578 | 580.97 | 582.65 | 583.9 | 584.77 | 668.69 | 697.18 | 831.19 | 877.19 |
| Independent | Michael McGivern | 4.88% | 393 | 393.54 | 398.88 | 399.58 | 399.97 | 434.72 | 439.95 | | |
| UUP | Roderick Swann* | 2.64% | 213 | 223.53 | 223.95 | 237.65 | 259.04 | 263.85 | | | |
| SDLP | Sean Mallon | 2.08% | 168 | 168.81 | 218.85 | 219 | 219.18 | | | | |
Electorate: 12,770 Valid: 8,060 (63.12%) Spoilt: 197 Quota: 1,008 Turnout: 8,257 (64.66%)

== 1997 election ==
1993: 3 x UUP, 1 x DUP, 1 x SDLP, 1 x Alliance, 1 x Independent Unionist

1997: 4 x UUP, 1 x DUP, 1 x SDLP, 1 x Alliance

1993-1997 change: Independent Unionist joins UUP

Antrim South East - 7 seats
| Party | Candidate | FPv% | Count | | | | | | | | |
| Party | Candidate | FPv% | 1 | 2 | 3 | 4 | 5 | 6 | 7 | 8 | 9 |
|---|---|---|---|---|---|---|---|---|---|---|---|
| UUP | Roy Thompson* | 17.18% | 996 | | | | | | | | |
| SDLP | Thomas Burns | 16.61% | 963 | | | | | | | | |
| UUP | Edgar Wallace* | 13.16% | 763 | | | | | | | | |
| UUP | Mervyn Rea* | 12.35% | 716 | 818.87 | | | | | | | |
| Alliance | David Ford* | 10.58% | 613 | 621.91 | 642.91 | 643.69 | 656.02 | 659.62 | 693.73 | 796.73 | |
| DUP | Samuel Dunlop* | 8.54% | 495 | 509.85 | 512.35 | 517.03 | 526.5 | 530.1 | 613.56 | 617.56 | 621.56 |
| UUP | Roderick Swann | 3.11% | 180 | 242.37 | 242.37 | 270.45 | 433.17 | 458.47 | 547.18 | 558.18 | 565.18 |
| DUP | William Harkness | 6.64% | 385 | 416.59 | 417.84 | 433.96 | 441.95 | 444.15 | 508.29 | 517.79 | 519.79 |
| SDLP | Lucia Trowlen | 3.05% | 177 | 178.08 | 386.08 | 386.34 | 386.34 | 386.34 | 392.34 | | |
| PUP | Ken Wilkinson | 6.18% | 358 | 367.99 | 368.99 | 371.85 | 380.64 | 381.54 | | | |
| UUP | Roy Stinson | 2.59% | 150 | 181.86 | 182.11 | 221.89 | | | | | |
Electorate: 12,301 Valid: 5,796 (47.12%) Spoilt: 76 Quota: 725 Turnout: 5,872 (47.74%)

== 1993 election ==
1989: 4 x UUP, 2 x DUP, 1 x SDLP

1993: 3 x UUP, 1 x DUP, 1 x SDLP, 1 x Alliance, 1 x Independent Unionist

1989-1993 change: Alliance gain from UUP, Independent Unionist leaves DUP

Antrim South East - 7 seats
| Party | Candidate | FPv% | Count | | | | | |
| Party | Candidate | FPv% | 1 | 2 | 3 | 4 | 5 | 6 |
|---|---|---|---|---|---|---|---|---|
| Ind. Unionist | Roy Thompson* | 21.85% | 1,280 | | | | | |
| UUP | Edgar Wallace* | 14.99% | 878 | | | | | |
| SDLP | Robert Burns* | 14.60% | 855 | | | | | |
| UUP | Mervyn Rea* | 9.32% | 546 | 702.64 | 739.44 | | | |
| Alliance | David Ford | 9.58% | 561 | 571.56 | 576.04 | 638.04 | 739.02 | |
| UUP | Howard Campbell* | 7.38% | 432 | 517.8 | 541.48 | 546.48 | 557.53 | 767.29 |
| DUP | Samuel Dunlop* | 9.56% | 560 | 638.76 | 645.16 | 647.16 | 648.35 | 679.23 |
| DUP | William Harkness | 6.76% | 396 | 486.64 | 494.16 | 494.16 | 495.86 | 526.34 |
| UUP | Roy Stinson* | 3.40% | 199 | 319.12 | 378.96 | 378.96 | 379.81 | |
| Sinn Féin | Joseph McCavana | 2.56% | 150 | 150 | 150 | | | |
Electorate: 11,431 Valid: 5,857 (51.24%) Spoilt: 128 Quota: 733 Turnout: 5,985 (52.36%)

== 1989 election ==
1985: 4 x UUP, 2 x DUP, 1 x SDLP

1989: 4 x UUP, 2 x DUP, 1 x SDLP

1985-1989 change: No change

Antrim South East - 7 seats
| Party | Candidate | FPv% | Count | | | | | | |
| Party | Candidate | FPv% | 1 | 2 | 3 | 4 | 5 | 6 | 7 |
|---|---|---|---|---|---|---|---|---|---|
| DUP | Roy Thompson* | 20.31% | 1,248 | | | | | | |
| UUP | Edgar Wallace* | 16.97% | 1,043 | | | | | | |
| UUP | Mervyn Rea* | 14.26% | 876 | | | | | | |
| UUP | Howard Campbell* | 11.18% | 687 | 750.18 | 839.62 | | | | |
| SDLP | Robert Burns* | 12.43% | 764 | 765.56 | 765.82 | 767.12 | 767.56 | 787.56 | |
| DUP | Samuel Dunlop* | 8.01% | 492 | 648 | 664.38 | 672.31 | 680.89 | 684.89 | 843.89 |
| UUP | Roy Stinson* | 4.62% | 284 | 325.73 | 466.13 | 548.68 | 602.36 | 604.71 | 771.09 |
| Alliance | David Ford | 4.87% | 299 | 300.95 | 307.71 | 309.79 | 311.55 | 520.11 | 525.45 |
| DUP | James Simpson | 3.42% | 210 | 417.09 | 426.97 | 435.94 | 440.12 | 442.51 | |
| Alliance | Theresa Gallagher | 3.94% | 242 | 243.17 | 243.95 | 244.6 | 245.04 | | |
Electorate: 11,349 Valid: 6,145 (54.15%) Spoilt: 166 Quota: 769 Turnout: 6,311 (55.61%)

== 1985 election ==
1985: 4 x UUP, 2 x DUP, 1 x SDLP

Antrim South East - 7 seats
| Party | Candidate | FPv% | Count | | | | | | | |
| Party | Candidate | FPv% | 1 | 2 | 3 | 4 | 5 | 6 | 7 | 8 |
|---|---|---|---|---|---|---|---|---|---|---|
| DUP | Roy Thompson* | 19.95% | 1,207 | | | | | | | |
| UUP | Edgar Wallace* | 12.69% | 768 | | | | | | | |
| SDLP | Robert Burns* | 12.56% | 760 | | | | | | | |
| DUP | Samuel Dunlop* | 11.35% | 687 | 809.84 | | | | | | |
| UUP | Carol Cunningham | 10.41% | 630 | 660.34 | 665.34 | 669.5 | 795.5 | | | |
| UUP | Howard Campbell | 9.07% | 549 | 564.54 | 566.54 | 568.62 | 628.53 | 649.01 | 651.72 | 794.79 |
| UUP | Mervyn Rea | 6.21% | 376 | 405.6 | 407.6 | 409.68 | 533.25 | 545.73 | 549.31 | 709.72 |
| Alliance | John McCourt | 5.01% | 303 | 309.66 | 501.66 | 502.3 | 508.67 | 509.63 | 510.08 | 517.63 |
| DUP | William McCormick | 3.34% | 202 | 422.52 | 424.89 | 464.41 | 501.01 | 504.85 | 505.05 | |
| UUP | James Robinson | 5.77% | 349 | 366.02 | 368.02 | 370.9 | | | | |
| Alliance | Theresa Gallagher | 3.64% | 220 | 220.37 | | | | | | |
Electorate: 10,286 Valid: 6,051 (58.83%) Spoilt: 114 Quota: 757 Turnout: 6,165 (59.94%)
