= Antrim North West (District Electoral Area) =

District electoral areas in Antrim, Northern Ireland

Antrim North West DEA (1993–2014) within Antrim

Antrim North West was one of the three district electoral areas in Antrim, Northern Ireland which existed from 1985 to 2014. The district elected five members to Antrim Borough Council and formed part of the South Antrim constituencies for the Northern Ireland Assembly and UK Parliament.

It was created for the 1985 local elections, replacing Antrim Area A which had existed since 1973, and contained the wards of Cranfield, Drumanaway, Randalstown, Tardree and Toome. For the 1993 local elections, it lost Tardree but gained Shilvodan. It was abolished for the 2014 local elections and most of the area was transferred to the new Dunsilly DEA.

== Councillors ==
Election	Councillor (Party)	Councillor (Party)	Councillor (Party)	Councillor (Party)	Councillor (Party)
2011	Robert Loughran (SDLP)	Anthony Brady (Sinn Féin)	Henry Cushinan (Sinn Féin)	Roderick Swann (UUP)	Trevor Clarke (DUP)
2005	Robert Loughran (SDLP)	Anthony Brady (Sinn Féin)	Henry Cushinan (Sinn Féin)	Stephen Nicholl (UUP)	Trevor Clarke (DUP)
2001	Robert Loughran (SDLP)	Donovan McClelland (SDLP)	Martin Meehan (Sinn Féin)	Stephen Nicholl (UUP)	Wilson Clyde (DUP)
1997	Robert Loughran (SDLP)	Donovan McClelland (SDLP)	Henry Cushinan (Sinn Féin)	James Graham (UUP)	Wilson Clyde (DUP)
1993	Robert Loughran (SDLP)	Donovan McClelland (SDLP)	Henry Cushinan (Sinn Féin)	James Graham (UUP)	Wilson Clyde (DUP)
1989	Robert Loughran (SDLP)	Donovan McClelland (SDLP)	Roderick Swann (UUP)	James Graham (UUP)	Wilson Clyde (DUP)
1985	Robert Loughran (SDLP)	Henry Cushinan (Sinn Féin)	John Blakeley (UUP)	James Graham (UUP)	Wilson Clyde (DUP)

== 2011 Election ==
2005: 2 x Sinn Féin, 1 x DUP, 1 x SDLP, 1 x UUP

2011: 2 x Sinn Féin, 1 x DUP, 1 x SDLP, 1 x UUP

2005-2011 Change: No change

Antrim North West - 5 seats
Party	Candidate	FPv%	Count						
Party	Candidate	FPv%	1	2	3	4	5	6	7
DUP	Trevor Clarke*	24.12%	1,172						
SDLP	Robert Loughran*	13.05%	634	648.57	715.19	1,150.19			
Sinn Féin	Anthony Brady*	15.19%	738	738.93	748.93	788.24	909.24		
Sinn Féin	Henry Cushinan*	13.79%	670	671.24	675.24	751.55	895.55		
UUP	Roderick Swann	10.41%	506	545.68	628.61	643.23	654.23	668.23	681.23
DUP	Wilson Clyde	6.77%	329	618.54	646.09	647.4	649.4	659.4	668.4
SDLP	Brian Duffin	11.58%	563	566.41	596.72				
Alliance	Pauline Savage	5.10%	248	252.65					
Electorate: 9,054 Valid: 4,860 (53.68%) Spoilt: 82 Quota: 811 Turnout: 4,942 (54.58%)

== 2005 Election ==
2001: 2 x SDLP, 1 x Sinn Féin, 1 x DUP, 1 x UUP

2005: 2 x Sinn Féin, 1 x SDLP, 1 x DUP, 1 x UUP

2001-2005 Change: Sinn Féin gain from SDLP

Antrim North West - 5 seats
Party	Candidate	FPv%	Count			
Party	Candidate	FPv%	1	2	3	4
SDLP	Robert Loughran*	19.37%	1,008			
Sinn Féin	Henry Cushinan	16.81%	875			
UUP	Stephen Nicholl*	14.10%	734	821	876	
Sinn Féin	Anthony Brady	11.93%	621	621	800	925.25
DUP	Trevor Clarke	13.37%	696	791	795	801.25
DUP	Wilson Clyde*	11.49%	598	639	645	653.25
SDLP	Donovan McClelland*	8.03%	418	430		
Independent	Brian Johnston	4.90%	255			
Electorate: 8,345 Valid: 5,205 (62.37%) Spoilt: 110 Quota: 868 Turnout: 5,315 (63.69%)

== 2001 Election ==
1997: 2 x SDLP, 1 x Sinn Féin, 1 x DUP, 1 x UUP

2001: 2 x SDLP, 1 x Sinn Féin, 1 x DUP, 1 x UUP

1997-2001 Change: No change

Antrim North West - 5 seats
Party	Candidate	FPv%	Count							
Party	Candidate	FPv%	1	2	3	4	5	6	7	8
SDLP	Robert Loughran*	18.78%	1,093							
DUP	Wilson Clyde*	18.09%	1,053							
Sinn Féin	Martin Meehan	17.30%	1,007							
SDLP	Donovan McClelland*	11.65%	678	725	822.35	822.75	1,027.75			
UUP	Stephen Nicholl	7.39%	430	465	466.32	489.6	493.26	515.26	793.52	822.92
UUP	Avril Swann	10.81%	629	659	660.65	677.05	677.16	680.16	786.49	792.44
NI Unionist	Brian Johnston	7.10%	413	420	420.99	456.99	459.98	472.98		
Sinn Féin	Joseph McCavana	6.60%	384	384	396.32	396.48				
Alliance	Michael Donoghue	2.29%	133							
Electorate: 8,544 Valid: 5,820 (68.12%) Spoilt: 109 Quota: 971 Turnout: 5,929 (69.39%)

== 1997 Election ==
1993: 2 x SDLP, 1 x Sinn Féin, 1 x DUP, 1 x UUP

1997: 2 x SDLP, 1 x Sinn Féin, 1 x DUP, 1 x UUP

1993-1997 Change: No change

Antrim North West - 5 seats
Party	Candidate	FPv%	Count				
Party	Candidate	FPv%	1	2	3	4	5
SDLP	Robert Loughran*	25.99%	1,115				
UUP	James Graham*	24.78%	1,063				
SDLP	Donovan McClelland*	10.02%	430	774.1			
DUP	Wilson Clyde*	15.92%	683	685.96	767.14		
Sinn Féin	Henry Cushinan*	14.27%	612	644.56	644.56	655.41	708.21
UUP	Avril Swann	5.92%	254	257.7	508.5	594.46	597.32
Alliance	George Picken	3.10%	133	147.8	159.02		
Electorate: 8,059 Valid: 4,290 (53.23%) Spoilt: 90 Quota: 716 Turnout: 4,380 (54.35%)

== 1993 Election ==
1989: 2 x SDLP, 1 x UUP, 1 x DUP

1993: 2 x SDLP, 1 x UUP, 1 x DUP, 1 x Sinn Féin

1989-1993 Change: Sinn Féin gain from UUP

Antrim North West - 5 seats
Party	Candidate	FPv%	Count				
Party	Candidate	FPv%	1	2	3	4	5
UUP	James Graham*	26.53%	1,167				
SDLP	Robert Loughran*	26.17%	1,151				
DUP	Wilson Clyde*	16.98%	747				
SDLP	Donovan McClelland*	9.93%	437	441.18	818.9		
Sinn Féin	Henry Cushinan	14.28%	628	628	656.12	723.95	723.99
UUP	Roderick Swann*	6.12%	269	692.7	700.68	714.17	721.09
Electorate: 7,627 Valid: 4,399 (57.68%) Spoilt: 131 Quota: 734 Turnout: 4,530 (59.39%)

== 1989 Election ==
1985: 2 x UUP, 1 x SDLP, 1 x DUP, 1 x Sinn Féin

1989: 2 x SDLP, 2 x UUP, 1 x DUP

1985-1989 Change: SDLP gain from Sinn Féin

Antrim North West - 5 seats
Party	Candidate	FPv%	Count				
Party	Candidate	FPv%	1	2	3	4	5
UUP	James Graham*	29.85%	1,374				
SDLP	Robert Loughran*	22.14%	1,019				
DUP	Wilson Clyde*	18.57%	855				
UUP	Roderick Swann	6.13%	282	875.55			
SDLP	Donovan McClelland*	8.80%	405	407.7	643.52	728.12	784.12
Sinn Féin	Henry Cushinan*	14.51%	668	669.35	684.43	686.23	693.23
Electorate: 7,570 Valid: 4,603 (60.81%) Spoilt: 98 Quota: 768 Turnout: 4,701 (62.10%)

== 1985 Election ==
1985: 2 x UUP, 1 x SDLP, 1 x DUP, 1 x Sinn Féin

Antrim North West - 5 seats
Party	Candidate	FPv%	Count						
Party	Candidate	FPv%	1	2	3	4	5	6	7
UUP	James Graham*	23.84%	1,164						
DUP	Wilson Clyde*	17.84%	871						
SDLP	Robert Loughran*	16.10%	786	791.4	824.4				
UUP	John Blakeley*	5.31%	259	501.1	533.7	538.32	711.04	712.04	867.04
Sinn Féin	Henry Cushinan	13.83%	675	675.3	675.3	675.48	675.48	783.48	783.48
SDLP	James Laverty	9.73%	475	475	483	483.06	484.06	586.36	587.36
DUP	Samuel Hall	3.83%	187	222.4	226.4	271.76	294.78	295.78	
Irish Independence	John Heffron*	4.81%	235	235.9	242.9	242.96	242.96		
UUP	Roderick Swann	2.52%	123	179.7	202.6	203.68			
Alliance	John Wallace	2.19%	107	113					
Electorate: 7,005 Valid: 4,882 (60.81%) Spoilt: 88 Quota: 814 Turnout: 4,970 (70.95%)
