= Danny Kinahan =

Northern Ireland politician

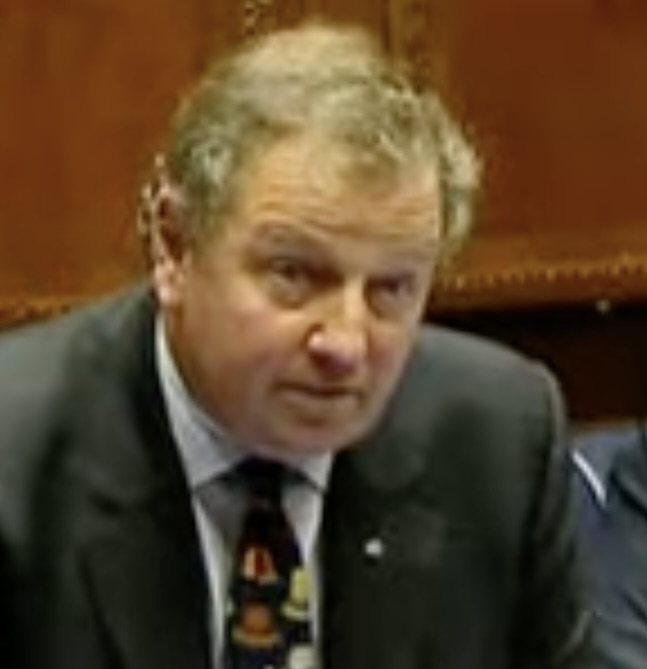
- Kinahan in 2013

Veterans Commissioner for Northern Ireland
- In office 27 August 2020 – 5 September 2024
- Preceded by: Office established
- Succeeded by: David Johnstone

Member of Antrim and Newtownabbey Borough Council
- In office 2 May 2019 – 2 September 2020
- Preceded by: James Bingham
- Succeeded by: Norrie Ramsay
- Constituency: Ballyclare

Member of Parliament for South Antrim
- In office 8 May 2015 – 3 May 2017
- Preceded by: William McCrea
- Succeeded by: Paul Girvan

Member of the Legislative Assembly for South Antrim
- In office 1 June 2009 – 24 June 2015
- Preceded by: David Burnside
- Succeeded by: Adrian Cochrane-Watson

Member of Antrim Borough Council
- In office 5 May 2005 – 5 May 2011
- Preceded by: Edgar Wallace
- Succeeded by: Paul Michael
- Constituency: Antrim South East

Personal details
- Born: Daniel de Burgh Kinahan; 14 April 1958 (age 68) Belfast, Northern Ireland
- Party: UUP
- Spouse: Anna
- Children: 4
- Education: University of Edinburgh; Royal Military Academy Sandhurst

Military service
- Allegiance: United Kingdom
- Branch/service: British Army
- Rank: Captain
- Unit: Blues and Royals

Daniel de Burgh Kinahan (born 14 April 1958) is a British army officer and former Ulster Unionist Party (UUP) politician who was Veterans Commissioner for Northern Ireland between 2020 and 2024.

Kinahan served as the Member of Parliament (MP) for South Antrim from 2015 to 2017.

Additionally, Kinahan was a Member of the Legislative Assembly (MLA) for South Antrim from 2009 to 2015.

== Early life and personal life ==
He is the son of Sir Robin Kinahan and Coralie de Burgh and was educated at Craigflower Preparatory School (Torryburn), Stowe School and the University of Edinburgh. He is a cousin of singer Chris de Burgh. Professionally, Kinahan is an antiques expert and worked as Christie's auctioneers' Irish representative.

He lived for many years with his wife and four children at Castle Upton, Templepatrick but in 2016 announced he was selling the family home to downsize following the moving out of his children.

== Political career ==
=== Northern Ireland Assembly and local government ===
In 2005 he was elected to Antrim Borough Council, and on 28 May 2009 the UUP South Antrim branch selected Kinahan to replace the outgoing MLA David Burnside who resigned to pursue business interests. Burnside officially stood down on 1 June. Kinahan was sworn in on 9 June.

Kinahan faced his first NI Assembly election in May 2011 and was elected with 3,445 first preference votes. During his second period in Stormont, he was heavily involved in education legislation as the UUP's spokesperson on the policy area.

As Deputy Chair of the Education Committee, Kinahan became a leading figure during the passage of the Education Bill. He also opposed the Sinn Féin policy of scrapping grammar schools, arguing instead for academic capability streaming.

Kinahan also expressed strong support in favour of shared and integrated education, greater emphasis on STEM subjects, a wider selection of apprenticeships, stronger provision of careers advice and more thorough and engaging university degrees.

Kinahan was the only UUP MLA to support legalising same-sex marriage, making a speech on the issue at Stormont, which many deemed risky just weeks out from the Westminster election, which he eventually won.

He stepped down from the Assembly after his election to Westminster, and was replaced by Adrian Cochrane-Watson.

Kinahan made his return to elected politics at the 2019 Council elections, topping the poll in the Ballyclare DEA.

=== Member of Parliament ===
The UUP decided to run Kinahan in the 2015 general election, and he ousted the incumbent Democratic Unionist Party (DUP) MP William McCrea with a majority of 949.

Kinahan backed a remain vote during the 2016 Brexit referendum.

He was defeated by the DUP's Paul Girvan at the 2017 general election, following a resurgence in the DUP's vote in that election.

Kinahan re-contested his former seat at the 2019 general election, losing out to Girvan by 2,689 votes.

== Veterans Commissioner of Northern Ireland ==
In August 2020, he was appointed Northern Ireland's first Veterans Commissioner. He resigned from the role in September 2024, citing he “cannot provide the independent voice that veterans require”.

Northern Ireland Assembly
Preceded by David Burnside	Member of the Legislative Assembly for South Antrim; 2009–2015	Succeeded by Adrian Cochrane-Watson
Parliament of the United Kingdom
Preceded by William McCrea	Member of Parliament for South Antrim; 2015–2017	Succeeded by Paul Girvan
