= Trevor Clarke (politician) =

Northern Irish politician

Trevor Clarke MLA
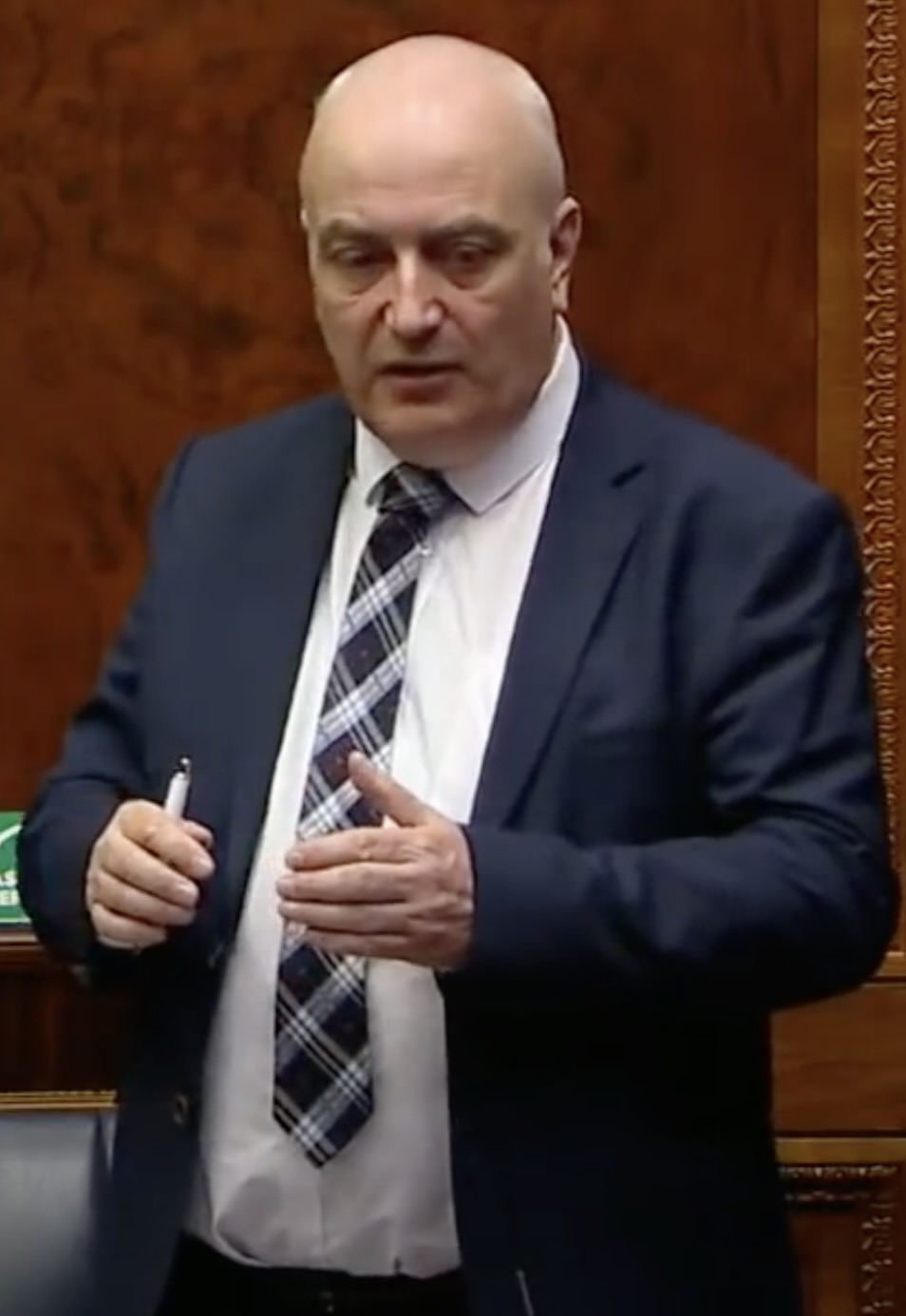
- Clarke in 2021

Member of the Northern Ireland Assembly for South Antrim
- Incumbent
- Assumed office 28 June 2017
- Preceded by: Paul Givan
- In office 7 March 2007 – 2 March 2017
- Preceded by: multiple members
- Succeeded by: multiple members

Member of Antrim Borough Council
- In office 5 May 2005 – 22 May 2014
- Preceded by: Wilson Clyde
- Succeeded by: Council abolished
- Constituency: Antrim North West

Personal details
- Born: 28 July 1967 (age 59) Antrim, Northern Ireland
- Party: Democratic Unionist Party

Trevor Clarke MLA (born 28 July 1967) is a Democratic Unionist Party (DUP) politician, serving as a Member of the Legislative Assembly (MLA) for South Antrim since June 2017, having previously served from 2007 to March 2017. Clarke is the DUP's Spokesperson for Policing.

== Political career ==
Clarke was first elected in 2007 to the Northern Ireland Assembly as a Democratic Unionist Party (DUP) member for South Antrim. Clarke lost his seat at the 2017 Assembly election, but was later co-opted by the DUP after Paul Girvan was elected in the 2017 general election to represent South Antrim in the House of Commons.

== Controversies ==
Speaking in the Assembly in November 2016, he confessed to not knowing that heterosexual individuals could contract HIV, which was criticised by Elton John.

In 2020, Clarke apologised for liking a social media post suggesting that the COVID-19 pandemic was "God's punishment" for the legalization of same-sex marriage and abortion.

In 2021, Clarke defended meeting with loyalist paramilitaries, stating that "examples like that" showed "leadership".

== Personal life ==
Clarke is active in the Orange Order. His wife Linda is a DUP councillor.

== Links ==
- Profile, dup.org.uk; accessed 15 May 2016.

Northern Ireland Assembly
Preceded by multiple members	MLA for South Antrim; 2007–2017	Succeeded by multiple members
Preceded by Paul Girvan	MLA for South Antrim; 2017–present	Incumbent
