= Antrim (District Electoral Area) =

District electoral area in Northern Ireland

- Antrim and Newtownabbey Borough Council DEA constituency

Current constituency
- Created: 1985
- Seats: 7 (1985-2014); 6 (2014-)
- Councillors: Paul Dunlop (DUP); Neil Kelly (APNI); Roisin Lynch (SDLP); Lucille O'Hagan (SF); John Smyth (DUP); Leah Smyth (UUP)

Antrim DEA within Antrim and Newtownabbey

Antrim Town DEA (1993-2014) within Antrim

Antrim is one of the seven district electoral areas (DEA) in Antrim and Newtownabbey, Northern Ireland. The district elects six members to Antrim and Newtownabbey Borough Council and contains the wards of Antrim Centre, Fountain Hill, Greystone, Springfarm, Steeple and Stiles. Antrim forms part of the South Antrim constituencies for the Northern Ireland Assembly and UK Parliament.

It was created for the 1985 local elections, replacing Antrim Area C which had existed since 1973. It was called Antrim Town until 2014, and originally contained seven wards (Balloo, Fountain Hill, Massereene, Rathenraw, Springfarm, Steeple and Stiles). For the 2014 local elections it was reduced by one ward, losing Massereene and Rathenraw but gaining Antrim Centre.

== Councillors ==
Election	Councillor (party)	Councillor (party)	Councillor (party)	Councillor (party)	Councillor (party)	Councillor (party)	Councillor (party)
2023	Neil Kelly (Alliance)	Roisin Lynch (SDLP)	Lucille O'Hagan (Sinn Féin)	Leah Smyth (UUP)	Paul Dunlop (DUP)	John Smyth (DUP)	6 seats 2014–present
2019	Neil Kelly (Alliance)	Roisin Lynch (SDLP)	Jim Montgomery (UUP)	Leah Smyth (UUP)	Paul Dunlop (DUP)	John Smyth (DUP)	6 seats 2014–present
October 2018 Co-Option	Neil Kelly (Alliance)	Roisin Lynch (SDLP)	Jim Montgomery (UUP)	Andrew Ritchie (UUP)	Paul Dunlop (DUP)	John Smyth (DUP)	6 seats 2014–present
July 2015 Co-Option	Neil Kelly (Alliance)	Roisin Lynch (SDLP)	Jim Montgomery (UUP)	Andrew Ritchie (UUP)	Nigel Kells (DUP)	John Smyth (DUP)	6 seats 2014–present
2014	Neil Kelly (Alliance)	Roisin Lynch (SDLP)	Adrian Cochrane-Watson (UUP)	Andrew Ritchie (UUP)	Nigel Kells (DUP)	John Smyth (DUP)	6 seats 2014–present
2011	Neil Kelly (Alliance)	Gráinne Teggart (SDLP)	Adrian Cochrane-Watson (UUP)	Andrew Ritchie (UUP)	Pam Lewis (DUP)	Brian Graham (DUP)	Noel Maguire (Sinn Féin)
2005	David Ford (Alliance)	Oran Keenan (SDLP)	Adrian Cochrane-Watson (UUP)	Andrew Ritchie (UUP)	Pam Lewis (DUP)	Brian Graham (DUP)	John Smyth (DUP)
2001	Sean McKee (SDLP)	Oran Keenan (SDLP)	Adrian Cochrane-Watson (UUP)	Paddy Marks (UUP)	Paul Michael (UUP)	Brian Graham (DUP)	John Smyth (DUP)
1997	James McConnell (Alliance)	Oran Keenan (SDLP)	Adrian Cochrane-Watson (UUP)	Paddy Marks (UUP)	Andrew Thompson (UUP)	Andrew Ritchie (UUP)	Robert McClay (DUP)
1993	James McConnell (Alliance)	Oran Keenan (SDLP)	Jack Allen (UUP)	Paddy Marks (UUP)	Andrew Thompson (UUP)	Andrew Ritchie (UUP)	James Brown (DUP)
1989	James McConnell (Alliance)	Oran Keenan (SDLP)	Jack Allen (UUP)	Paddy Marks (UUP)	Andrew Thompson (UUP)	Avril Swann (UUP)	James Brown (DUP)
1985	James McConnell (Alliance)	Oran Keenan (SDLP)	Jack Allen (UUP)	Paddy Marks (UUP)	Roy Stinson (UUP)	Margaret Brown (DUP)	Charles Quinn (DUP)

== 2023 election ==
2019: 2 x DUP, 2 x UUP, 1 x Alliance, 1 x SDLP

2023: 2 x DUP, 1 x Sinn Féin, 1 x Alliance, 1 x UUP, 1 x SDLP

2019–2023 change: Sinn Féin gain from UUP

Antrim - 6 seats
Party	Candidate	FPv%	Count							
Party	Candidate	FPv%	1	2	3	4	5	6	7	8
Sinn Féin	Lucille O'Hagan	17.82%	1,270							
Alliance	Neil Kelly*	15.31%	1,091							
DUP	Paul Dunlop*	13.84%	986	987.05	1,078.05					
DUP	John Smyth*	10.12%	721	722.26	857.26	858.46	905.36	1,168.36		
SDLP	Roisin Lynch*	9.51%	678	851.67	888.34	902.68	903.35	913.35	914.71	1,104.71
UUP	Leah Smyth*	10.44%	744	746.1	764.31	768.15	770.16	867.16	963.04	1,032.04
UUP	Jim Montgomery*	6.20%	442	443.47	461.47	463.81	470.51	527.72	576	610
Alliance	Tommy Monahan	5.56%	396	443.04	482.77	524.59	524.59	536.07	538.79	
TUV	Richard Shields	6.36%	453	454.05	465.05	465.47	467.48			
DUP	Karl McMeekin	3.61%	257	257.21						
Green (NI)	Eleanor Bailey	1.23%	88	101.23						
Electorate: 16,652 Valid: 7,126 (42.79%) Spoilt: 89 Quota: 1,019 Turnout: 7,215 (43.33%)

== 2019 election ==
2014: 2 x DUP, 2 x UUP, 1 x Alliance, 1 x SDLP

2019: 2 x DUP, 2 x UUP, 1 x Alliance, 1 x SDLP

2014-2019 change: No change

Antrim - 6 seats
Party	Candidate	FPv%	Count						
Party	Candidate	FPv%	1	2	3	4	5	6	7
Alliance	Neil Kelly*	26.26%	1,689						
SDLP	Roisin Lynch*	11.24%	723	1,111.11					
DUP	John Smyth*	11.41%	734	765.11	769.79	832.32	1,047.32		
DUP	Paul Dunlop	9.38%	603	620.34	622.14	704.69	806.77	921.45	
UUP	Leah Smyth	9.56%	615	721.08	752.04	802.07	838.17	844.27	971.27
UUP	Jim Montgomery	6.47%	416	477.2	503.48	557.05	578.68	581.73	824.65
Sinn Féin	Gerard Magee	9.06%	583	637.06	725.98	727.98	728.34	728.34	740.89
Independent	Adrian Cochrane-Watson	5.58%	359	421.73	449.09	527.29	538.82	541.26	
DUP	Karl McMeekin	5.64%	363	379.83	382.35	403.35			
TUV	Richard Cairns	5.40%	347	374.54	379.58				
Electorate: 15,051 Valid: 6,432 (42.73%) Spoilt: 80 Quota: 919 Turnout: 6,512 (43.27%)

== 2014 election ==
2011: 2 x DUP, 2 x UUP, 1 x Alliance, 1 x Sinn Féin, 1 x SDLP

2014: 2 x DUP, 2 x UUP, 1 x Alliance, 1 x SDLP

2011-2014 change: Sinn Féin loss due to the reduction of one seat

Antrim - 6 seats
Party	Candidate	FPv%	Count					
Party	Candidate	FPv%	1	2	3	4	5	6
DUP	Nigel Kells †	11.15%	662	667	1,026			
UUP	Adrian Cochrane-Watson* †	13.22%	785	801	844	858.21		
DUP	John Smyth*	10.62%	631	636	724	856.79		
UUP	Drew Ritchie*	9.63%	572	595	614	626.25	1,009.25	
Alliance	Neil Kelly*	10.44%	620	813	825	830.39	876.39	
SDLP	Roisin Lynch	10.24%	608	636	637	638.47	648.94	690.94
Sinn Féin	Noel Maguire*	10.64%	632	643	644	644	646.98	646.98
TUV	Richard Cairns	9.43%	560	574	591	598.84		
DUP	Brian Graham*	9.09%	540	545				
Alliance	Sian O'Neill	3.06%	182					
NI21	George Young	2.42%	144					
Electorate: 14,408 Valid: 5,939 (41.22%) Spoilt: 101 Quota: 849 Turnout: 6,040 (41.92%)

== 2011 election ==
2005: 3 x DUP, 2 x UUP, 1 x Alliance, 1 x SDLP

2011: 2 x DUP, 2 x UUP, 1 x Alliance, 1 x Sinn Féin, 1 x SDLP

2005-2011 change: Sinn Féin gain from DUP

Antrim Town - 7 seats
Party	Candidate	FPv%	Count							
Party	Candidate	FPv%	1	2	3	4	5	6	7	8
UUP	Adrian Cochrane-Watson*	17.25%	884							
DUP	Pam Lewis*	14.32%	734							
Sinn Féin	Noel Maguire	12.45%	638	638.56	638.56	639.56	655.56			
UUP	Andrew Ritchie*	7.80%	400	490.72	496.44	521.51	654.87			
Alliance	Neil Kelly	9.77%	501	509.4	512.65	517.65	546.18	847.18		
DUP	Brian Graham*	9.97%	511	536.48	585.1	602.2	618.62	622.9	651.9	
SDLP	Gráinne Teggart	7.22%	370	371.4	372.44	372.44	418.85	455.53	580.53	591.53
DUP	John Smyth*	8.56%	439	459.16	486.59	523.38	530.54	536.62	561.62	562.62
Alliance	Oran Keenan*	6.89%	353	356.92	357.57	360.57	381.53			
UUP	Amanda Johnston	1.35%	69	151.6	154.2	167.33				
Independent	Donovan McClelland	2.30%	118	119.4	120.18	121.18				
PUP	Ken Wilkinson	2.13%	109	113.48	115.04					
Electorate: 11,925 Valid: 5,126 (42.99%) Spoilt: 102 Quota: 641 Turnout: 5,228 (43.84%)

== 2005 election ==
2001: 3 x UUP, 2 x DUP, 2 x SDLP

2005: 3 x DUP, 2 x UUP, 1 x SDLP, 1 x Alliance

2001-2005 change: DUP and Alliance gain from UUP and SDLP

Antrim Town - 7 seats
Party	Candidate	FPv%	Count						
Party	Candidate	FPv%	1	2	3	4	5	6	7
DUP	John Smyth*	13.33%	705						
UUP	Adrian Cochrane-Watson*	12.65%	669						
SDLP	Oran Keenan*	8.08%	427	427.06	434.12	684.12			
Alliance	David Ford	11.65%	616	616.66	626.72	680.72			
UUP	Andrew Ritchie	8.00%	423	425.52	485.12	489.12	490.47	791.47	
DUP	Brian Graham*	8.80%	465	484.86	537.28	538.28	538.58	579.36	658.41
DUP	Pam Lewis	9.06%	479	493.94	539.3	543.3	544.05	574.89	626.04
Sinn Féin	Gerard Magee	8.98%	475	475	490	518	534.65	539.1	539.1
UUP	Paul Michael*	7.02%	371	372.8	439.1	441.1	444.1		
SDLP	Brian Duffin	6.53%	345	345.06	356.06				
Independent	Darran Smyth	2.57%	136	136.9					
PUP	Ken Wilkinson	2.08%	110	110.66					
UUP	James Sands	0.72%	38	38.48					
Independent	Aine Gribbon	0.53%	28	28					
Electorate: 10,792 Valid: 5,287 (48.99%) Spoilt: 123 Quota: 661 Turnout: 5,410 (50.13%)

== 2001 election ==
1997: 4 x UUP, 1 x DUP, 1 x SDLP, 1 x Alliance

2001: 3 x UUP, 2 x DUP, 2 x SDLP

1997-2001 change: DUP and SDLP gain from UUP and Alliance

Antrim Town - 7 seats
Party	Candidate	FPv%	Count								
Party	Candidate	FPv%	1	2	3	4	5	6	7	8	9
UUP	Paddy Marks*	15.98%	1,016								
DUP	John Smyth	11.78%	749	759.56	799.56						
UUP	Adrian Cochrane-Watson*	9.94%	632	695.14	721.36	812.36					
DUP	Brian Graham	8.12%	516	521.28	532.28	542.7	543.58	847.58			
UUP	Paul Michael	7.39%	470	529.18	566.4	751.86	766.6	808.6			
SDLP	Sean McKee	9.94%	632	635.96	642.96	646.62	646.84	648.84	651.36	651.36	778.36
SDLP	Oran Keenan*	9.61%	611	614.52	617.74	620.84	621.06	623.06	625.58	625.58	726.58
Sinn Féin	Aine Gribbon	7.79%	495	495.44	500.44	500.44	500.66	501.66	501.66	501.66	517.66
Alliance	Pete Whitcroft	6.39%	406	411.06	420.06	429.36	429.8	439.44	486.48	491.48	
DUP	Robert McClay*	5.76%	366	373.26	391.7	408.12	408.56				
UUP	Andrew Ritchie*	4.22%	268	325.42	344.08						
PUP	Ken Wilkinson	3.10%	197	199.42							
Electorate: 11,616 Valid: 6,358 (54.73%) Spoilt: 195 Quota: 795 Turnout: 6,553 (56.41%)

== 1997 election ==
1993: 4 x UUP, 1 x DUP, 1 x SDLP, 1 x Alliance

1997: 4 x UUP, 1 x DUP, 1 x SDLP, 1 x Alliance

1993-1997 change: No change

Antrim Town - 7 seats
Party	Candidate	FPv%	Count								
Party	Candidate	FPv%	1	2	3	4	5	6	7	8	9
UUP	Paddy Marks*	25.51%	1,066								
DUP	Robert McClay	15.36%	642								
UUP	Andrew Ritchie*	6.87%	287	646.04							
SDLP	Oran Keenan*	12.30%	514	516.04	516.04	516.24	520.75	531.75			
UUP	Andrew Thompson*	5.22%	218	314.39	410.95	479.55	495.72	504.18	562.18		
UUP	Adrian Cochrane-Watson	8.54%	357	410.04	427.38	464.38	474.03	485.18	524.24		
Alliance	James McConnell*	6.41%	268	279.73	281.09	282.69	292.4	412.2	458.8	467.8	470.71
SDLP	Sean McKee	10.36%	433	436.06	436.23	436.43	437.43	446.43	458.43	460.43	466.25
Independent	Maurice Lynn	2.97%	124	126.55	127.06	130.06	193.19	202.1			
Alliance	Mary Wallace	3.80%	159	167.16	169.03	170.63	178.05				
Independent	Samuel Greer	2.66%	111	115.59	116.44	121.24					
Electorate: 11,780 Valid: 4,179 (35.48%) Spoilt: 92 Quota: 523 Turnout: 4,271 (36.26%)

== 1993 election ==
1989: 4 x UUP, 1 x DUP, 1 x SDLP, 1 x Alliance

1993: 4 x UUP, 1 x DUP, 1 x SDLP, 1 x Alliance

1989-1993 change: No change

Antrim Town - 7 seats
Party	Candidate	FPv%	Count								
Party	Candidate	FPv%	1	2	3	4	5	6	7	8	9
UUP	Paddy Marks*	17.45%	791								
UUP	Jack Allen*	15.86%	719								
SDLP	Oran Keenan*	14.67%	665								
DUP	James Brown*	12.31%	558	570.76							
UUP	Andrew Ritchie	6.57%	298	398.05	472.81	473.61	475.82	548.8	557.01	638.01	
Alliance	James McConnell*	8.80%	399	405.38	413.15	448.03	473.51	476.01	525.08	531.08	532.08
UUP	Andrew Thompson*	5.56%	252	291.73	312.52	312.68	312.68	341.6	343.76	461.13	516.13
Alliance	Mary Wallace	6.40%	290	292.9	295.63	328.27	355.03	358.03	435.51	448.46	450.46
UUP	Avril Swann*	3.31%	150	202.2	224.25	224.25	224.25	248.3	252.93		
Democratic Left	Patrick McGinley	3.95%	179	180.16	181.42	192.14	217.62	219.83			
DUP	James Porter	3.33%	151	158.54	174.5	174.66	175.66				
Workers' Party	Eamon Gillen	1.81%	82	82	83.47	100.75					
Electorate: 11,484 Valid: 4,534 (39.48%) Spoilt: 131 Quota: 567 Turnout: 4,665 (40.62%)

== 1989 election ==
1985: 3 x UUP, 2 x DUP, 1 x SDLP, 1 x Alliance

1989: 4 x UUP, 1 x DUP, 1 x SDLP, 1 x Alliance

1985-1989 change: UUP gain from DUP

Antrim Town - 7 seats
Party	Candidate	FPv%	Count								
Party	Candidate	FPv%	1	2	3	4	5	6	7	8	9
UUP	Jack Allen*	21.11%	907								
UUP	Paddy Marks*	17.25%	741								
DUP	James Brown	14.06%	604								
SDLP	Oran Keenan*	12.52%	535	537.46	538.58						
Alliance	James McConnell*	8.26%	355	364.43	368.91	377.73	378.06	388.06	536.21	619.21	
UUP	Avril Swann	3.12%	134	330.8	433.56	466.13	469.32	473.32	475.32	491.47	501.47
UUP	Andrew Thompson	5.68%	244	324.77	386.65	396	398.64	398.64	399.64	402.05	405.05
DUP	James Graham	4.66%	200	248.38	269.1	284.2	342.83	342.83	343.8	352.03	358.03
Workers' Party	Eamon Gillen	3.68%	158	162.51	163.91	179.91	180.35	253.35	275.35		
Alliance	Peter Kelly	4.00%	172	176.51	178.19	181.19	181.41	202.41			
Sinn Féin	Paul Little	3.98%	171	171	171.28	171.28	171.28				
Independent	James Millar	1.75%	75	89.76	97.04						
Electorate: 9,883 Valid: 4,296 (43.47%) Spoilt: 141 Quota: 538 Turnout: 4,437 (44.90%)

== 1985 election ==
1985: 3 x UUP, 2 x DUP, 1 x SDLP, 1 x Alliance

Antrim Town - 7 seats
Party	Candidate	FPv%	Count							
Party	Candidate	FPv%	1	2	3	4	5	6	7	8
UUP	Jack Allen*	21.03%	872							
SDLP	Oran Keenan	16.16%	670							
UUP	Paddy Marks*	15.48%	642							
Alliance	James McConnell	6.42%	266	273.79	324.79	326.31	352.31	399	405.28	577.28
UUP	Roy Stinson	2.41%	100	289.01	289.01	333.85	337.79	340.98	498.4	516.46
DUP	Margaret Brown	10.44%	433	469.9	470.15	478.89	478.89	480.71	505.24	510.88
DUP	Charles Quinn*	9.72%	403	421.45	421.45	430.95	431.45	432.64	464.38	465.38
DUP	Adam McKee	6.75%	280	295.17	295.67	304.22	305.97	308.97	337.5	346.05
Alliance	Mary Wallace	3.50%	145	149.1	196.1	199.9	251.81	308.82	314.28	
UUP	Andrew Thompson	3.93%	163	239.26	239.76	282.13	283.82	284.82		
Alliance	James Williamson	2.63%	109	111.46	116.96	117.72	121.97			
Workers' Party	Robert Owens	1.52%	63	63.41	108.41	108.79				
Electorate: 9,755 Valid: 4,146 (42.50%) Spoilt: 138 Quota: 519 Turnout: 4,284 (43.92%)
