= Adrian Cochrane-Watson =

Northern Irish unionist politician

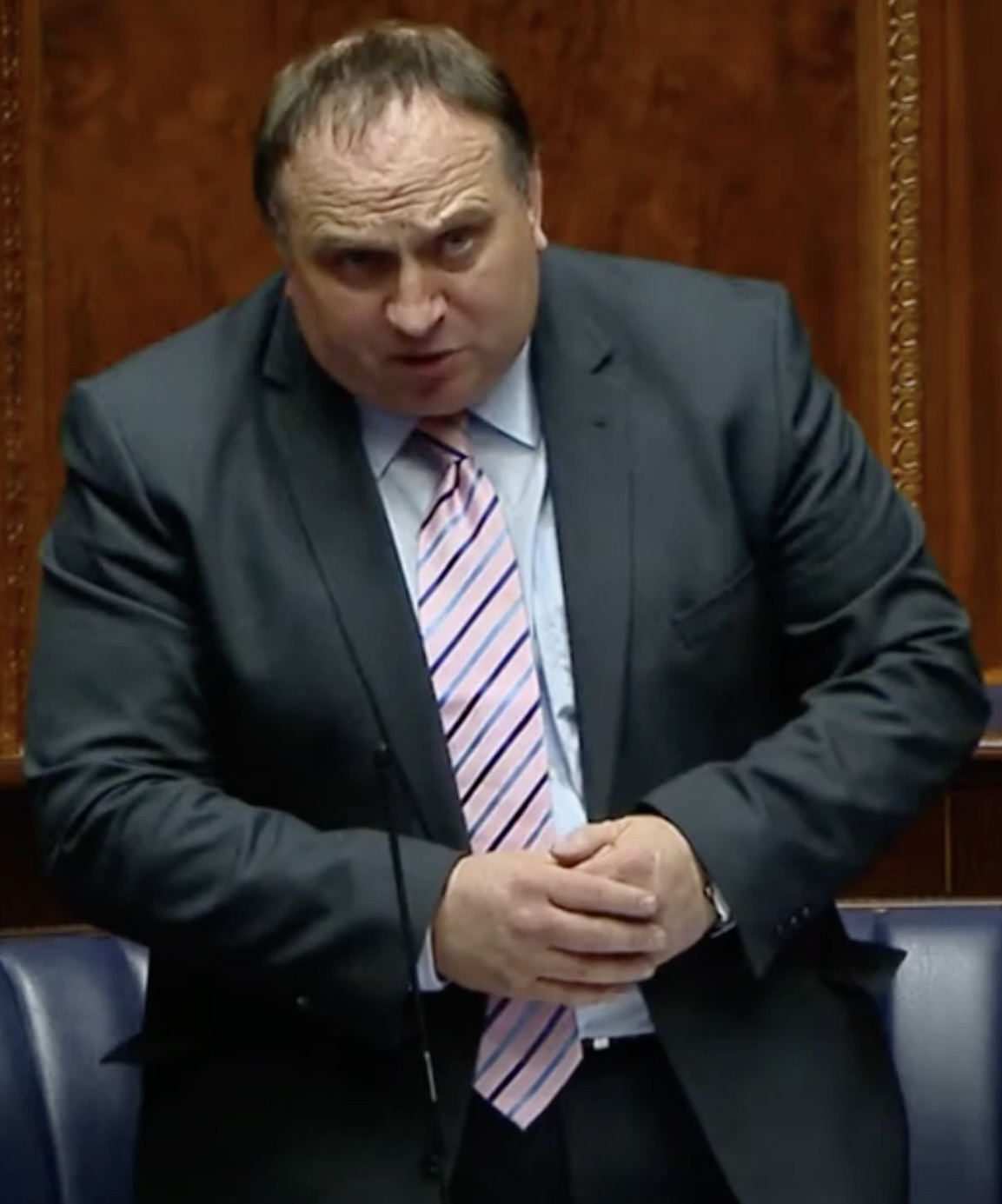
- Cochrane-Watson in 2015

Member of the Legislative Assembly for South Antrim
- In office 29 June 2015 – 7 May 2016
- Preceded by: Danny Kinahan
- Succeeded by: Steve Aiken

Member of Antrim and Newtownabbey Borough Council
- In office 22 May 2014 – 29 June 2015
- Preceded by: Council established
- Succeeded by: Jim Montgomery
- Constituency: Antrim

Member of Antrim Borough Council
- In office 21 May 1997 – 22 May 2014
- Preceded by: Jack Allen
- Succeeded by: Council abolished
- Constituency: Antrim Town

Personal details
- Born: 18 February 1967 (age 59) Antrim, Northern Ireland
- Party: Independent (since 2019)
- Other political affiliations: UUP (until 2019)
- Spouse: Heather
- Children: 4
- Profession: Businessman

Adrian Cochrane-Watson (born 18 February 1967) is a former Northern Irish unionist politician who was an Ulster Unionist Party (UUP) Member of the Northern Ireland Assembly (MLA) for South Antrim between 2015 and 2016. He previously served as an Antrim Councillor for the Antrim Town DEA from 1997 to 2014.

== Career ==
Cochrane-Watson was first elected to Antrim Borough Council in the 1997 local elections, representing the Antrim Town District.

He was re-elected in 2001, and was later one of three UUP candidates in South Antrim at the 2003 Assembly election, though he was not elected to the Assembly.

Cochrane-Watson was re-elected at the 2005 and 2011 local elections. He was elected onto the newly-formed Antrim and Newtownabbey Borough Council in 2014, representing the Antrim DEA.

In 2015, he was co-opted to the Northern Ireland Assembly, succeeding South Antrim MLA,Danny Kinahan. Cochrane-Watson lost his seat at the 2016 Assembly election, and was unable to regain it at the subsequent election in 2017.

He stood as an independent candidate, in his former Antrim District, at the 2019 Council election but was not elected.

Northern Ireland Assembly
Preceded by Danny Kinahan	Member of the Legislative Assembly for South Antrim; 2015–2016	Succeeded by Steve Aiken
