= South Antrim =

South Antrim may refer to:

- The southern part of County Antrim
- South Antrim (Assembly constituency)
- South Antrim (Northern Ireland Parliament constituency)
- South Antrim (UK Parliament constituency)
