= Thomas Burns (politician) =

Northern Irish politician (born 1960)

Member of Antrim and Newtownabbey Borough Council
- In office 22 May 2014 – 18 May 2023
- Preceded by: District created
- Succeeded by: Maighréad Ní Chonghaile
- Constituency: Airport

Member of Antrim Borough Council
- In office 21 May 1997 – 22 May 2014
- Preceded by: Robert Burns
- Succeeded by: Council abolished
- Constituency: Antrim South East

Member of the Legislative Assembly for Antrim South
- In office 26 November 2003 – 2011
- Preceded by: Donovan McClelland
- Succeeded by: Pam Lewis

Personal details
- Born: 29 August 1960 (age 65) Aldergrove, County Antrim, Northern Ireland
- Party: SDLP
- Website: http://www.thomasburns.org

Thomas Burns (born 29 August 1960) is a Social Democratic and Labour Party (SDLP) politician who was a Member of the Legislative Assembly (MLA) for South Antrim from 2003 to 2011.

Burns was also an Antrim Councillor, for the Antrim South East DEA, from 1997 to 2014. He then represented the Airport DEA on Antrim and Newtownabbey Borough Council from 2014 to 2023.

== Career ==
Burns was first elected to Antrim Borough Council in 1997, for the Antrim South East District. He was elected to the Northern Ireland Assembly in 2003 for South Antrim, and re-elected in 2007. At the 2011 Assembly election, Burns lost his seat, but was re-elected to Antrim Borough Council in the local elections that same day.

At the 2014 local elections, Burns was elected onto the newly-formed Antrim and Newtownabbey Borough Council for the Airport District, and was re-elected in 2019. He lost his council seat in the 2023 local elections.

Additionally, he has served as Chairman of his local branch of the SDLP.

== Membership ==
- Vice Chairman of the Council's planning committee
- Crumlin Development Association
- Chairman of Camlin Credit Union in Crumlin
- Member of Citizens Advice Bureau
- Board of Governors of two local schools, St Josephs Primary School and Crumlin High School.

A keen supporter of the Gaelic Athletic Association, Burns is a former player for Aldergrove GAC.

Northern Ireland Assembly
Preceded by Donovan McClelland	MLA for Antrim South; 2003–2011	Succeeded by Pam Lewis
