= Roy Thompson (politician) =

Politician from Northern Ireland (born 1946)

Member of Antrim Borough Council
- In office 5 May 2011 – 22 May 2014
- Preceded by: Mel Lucas
- Succeeded by: Council abolished
- Constituency: Antrim South East
- In office 15 May 1985 – 5 May 2005
- Preceded by: District created
- Succeeded by: Alan Lawther
- Constituency: Antrim South East
- In office 20 May 1981 – 15 May 1985
- Preceded by: Allister Lucas
- Succeeded by: District abolished
- Constituency: Antrim Area B

Member of the Northern Ireland Assembly for South Antrim
- In office 1982–1986

Personal details
- Born: 1946 (age 79–80) County Antrim, Northern Ireland
- Party: DUP (before 1992; since 2005)
- Other political affiliations: Independent Unionist (1992-1997); Ulster Unionist (1997 - 2005)

Roy Thompson (born 1946) is a former Northern Irish unionist politician who has served as both a Democratic Unionist Party (DUP) and Ulster Unionist Party (UUP) representative.

== Background ==
A dairy farmer by profession Thompson was involved in politics from an early age and was a founder member of the DUP, serving on the new party's executive. He was elected to Antrim Borough Council in the 1981 elections and the following year was elected to the Northern Ireland Assembly for South Antrim. Whilst serving as deputy mayor of Antrim in 1992 he resigned from the DUP for unknown reasons, although he stated publicly that his decision had nothing to do with Ian Paisley's leadership.

Thompson has subsequently changed political allegiance on a number of occasions. In the 1993 local elections he was returned to Antrim Council as an Independent Unionist before in 1997 retaining the seat as a UUP member. He remained a councillor until 2005 when he was defeated, having returned to the DUP. Once again representing the DUP Thompson was re-elected to the council in 2011. Roy Thompson was convicted of subsidy fraud in November 2003.

Northern Ireland Assembly (1982)
New assembly	MPA for South Antrim; 1982–1986	Assembly abolished
