= Antrim (borough) =

District of Northern Ireland (1973–2015)

Coordinates: 54.727°N 6.210°W

Antrim Borough: Buirg Aontroma
- Area: 577 km^{2} (223 sq mi); Ranked 11th of 26
- District HQ: Antrim
- Catholic: 41.2%
- Protestant: 50.5%
- Country: Northern Ireland
- Sovereign state: United Kingdom
- Councillors: MLAs DUP: 2 Alliance Party: 1 Sinn Féin: 1 UUP: 1; MPs Paul Girvan (DUP)
- Website: www.antrim.gov.uk

Antrim (named after the town of Antrim) was a local government district in Northern Ireland. It was one of twenty-six districts created in 1973, and was granted borough status on 9 May 1977. The borough covered an area of some 220 square miles (570 km^{2}) and had a population of 53,428 according to the 2011 census. It was situated about 19 miles (31 km) north-west of Belfast. It bordered the north and east shores of Lough Neagh, the largest fresh water lake in the United Kingdom, and included the towns of Antrim, Toomebridge, Crumlin, Randalstown, Parkgate and Templepatrick. The council headquarters were located on the outskirts of Antrim town. Although the borough was not within the Belfast Metropolitan Area, it housed the city's international airport and many commuter villages.

== Borough council ==
The borough was sub-divided into three electoral areas: Antrim South-East, Antrim North-West and Antrim Town, from which 19 members were elected. As of February 2011, the following political parties were represented: 5 Democratic Unionist Party (DUP), 5 Ulster Unionist Party (UUP), 3 Sinn Féin, 3 Alliance Party, 2 Social Democratic and Labour Party (SDLP) and 1 Traditional Unionist Voice. An election was held every four years using the proportional representation system.

A mayor and deputy mayor were elected from among the councillors at the borough council's annual meeting in June. For the civic year 2012/2013 the Mayor of Antrim was Roy Thompson (DUP) and the Deputy Mayor was Roderick Swann (UUP).

== Economy ==
The economy of the area revolved around construction, distribution, transport and hospitality. It had a well-developed transport infrastructure that provided easy access to all the main external gateways for Northern Ireland and all parts of the region. Antrim Town lies on two of the main transport corridors, the Belfast – Derry corridor and the Southern corridor. Belfast International Airport was located within the borough, only 4 miles (6.4 km) from Antrim town.

== Parliamentary representation ==
Together with part of the districts of Newtownabbey and Lisburn, it formed the South Antrim constituency for elections to the Westminster Parliament and Northern Ireland Assembly.

== See also ==
- Local government in Northern Ireland
