= Donovan McClelland =

Irish politician (1949–2018)

Member of Antrim Borough Council
- In office 17 May 1989 – 5 May 2005
- Preceded by: Henry Cushinan
- Succeeded by: Anthony Brady
- Constituency: Antrim North West

Deputy speaker of the Northern Ireland Assembly
- In office 31 January 2000 – 28 April 2003
- Preceded by: Office created
- Succeeded by: John Dallat (2007)

Member of the Legislative Assembly for South Antrim
- In office 25 June 1998 – 26 November 2003
- Preceded by: New Creation
- Succeeded by: Thomas Burns

Member of the Northern Ireland Forum for South Antrim
- In office 30 May 1996 – 25 April 1998

Personal details
- Born: Seamus Donovan McClelland; 14 January 1949 Toome, Northern Ireland
- Died: 23 February 2018 (aged 69)
- Party: SDLP
- Spouse: Noreen McClelland
- Children: 3

Seamus Donovan McClelland (14 January 1949 – 23 February 2018) was an Irish Social Democratic and Labour Party (SDLP) politician who was a member of the Northern Ireland Assembly (MLA) for South Antrim from 1998 to 2003.

== Background ==
McClelland was appointed deputy speaker in February 2000. He was chairman of the Standards and Privileges Committee and a member of the Public Accounts Committee.

Educated at Ballymena Academy, he went on to Trinity College, Dublin and Queen's University Belfast, where he graduated with a Bachelor of Science degree in economics. In 1973, McClelland joined the staff of Queen's University Belfast and began his career as a researcher and lecturer. He joined the Department of Agriculture in 1975 and, in 1978, took up a post as lecturer in economics at the University of Ulster.

McClelland entered politics in 1989 when he was elected to Antrim Borough Council. He was elected as deputy mayor of the borough in 1999. He was an SDLP delegate to the Brooke/Mayhew talks in 1992 and a delegate to the Forum for Peace and Reconciliation, established by the Irish Government at Dublin Castle in 1994.

McClelland was elected to the new Northern Ireland Forum in 1996 and was a member of the SDLP delegation to the Multi-party Talks chaired by Senator George Mitchell. He stood as a parliamentary candidate for the South Antrim constituency in the Westminster elections on three occasions.

== Personal life and death ==
McClelland was married to Noreen, a local councillor and 2005 UK General Election candidate for the SDLP. The couple raised three children. He died on 23 February 2018, at the age of 69.

Northern Ireland Forum
New forum	Member for South Antrim; 1996–1998	Forum dissolved
Northern Ireland Assembly
New assembly	MLA for Antrim South; 1998–2003	Succeeded by Thomas Burns
New office	Deputy Speaker of the Northern Ireland Assembly; 2000–2007; With: Sir John Gorman 2000–2002; Jane Morrice 2000–2007; Jim Wilson 2002–2007	Succeeded by Francie Molloy; David McClarty; John Dallat
