= Wilson Clyde =

Northern Irish politician (1934–2019)

Member of the Northern Ireland Assembly for Antrim South
- In office 25 June 1998 – 7 March 2007
- Preceded by: New Creation
- Succeeded by: William McCrea

Personal details
- Born: 8 April 1934 Kilbegs, County Antrim, Northern Ireland
- Died: 19 April 2019 (aged 85)
- Party: Democratic Unionist Party
- Spouse: Evelyn
- Occupation: Farmer

Samuel Wilson Clyde (8 April 1934 – 19 April 2019) was a Northern Irish Democratic Unionist Party (DUP) politician who was a Member of the Legislative Assembly for South Antrim from 1998 to 2007.

== Life and career ==
Born in Kilbegs, County Antrim, Clyde worked as a farmer before being elected to Antrim Borough Council for the Democratic Unionist Party in 1981. In 1996, he was elected to the Northern Ireland Forum, representing South Antrim, and he held the seat at the 1998 and 2003 elections to the Northern Ireland Assembly. He was deselected by the DUP for the 2007 election.

Clyde died on 19 April 2019, at the age of 85.

== Sources ==
- The Northern Ireland Assembly: Wilson Clyde

Northern Ireland Forum
New forum	Member for South Antrim; 1996–1998	Forum dissolved
Northern Ireland Assembly
New assembly	MLA for Antrim South; 1998–2007	Succeeded by William McCrea
