= Antrim Borough Council =

Former authority of Antrim, Northern Ireland

Type
- Type: District Council of Antrim (borough)
- Seats: 19 councillors

Antrim Borough Council was the local authority of Antrim in Northern Ireland. It merged with Newtownabbey Borough Council on 1 April 2015 under local government reorganisation in Northern Ireland to become Antrim and Newtownabbey Borough Council.

== Members ==
Map of the borough's DEAs from 1993 to 2014

Antrim Borough Council was sub-divided into three electoral areas: Antrim South-East, Antrim North-West and Antrim Town, from which 19 members were elected. In the last election to the former Council in February 2011, the following political parties were represented: 5 Democratic Unionist Party (DUP), 5 Ulster Unionist Party (UUP), 3 Sinn Féin, 3 Alliance Party, 2 Social Democratic and Labour Party and 1 Traditional Unionist Voice. Elections were held every four years using the single transferable vote system.

== Mayor ==
A mayor and deputy mayor were elected from among the councillors at the borough council's annual meeting in June. For the civic year 2012/2013 the Mayor of Antrim was Roy Thompson (DUP) and the Deputy Mayor was Roderick Swann (UUP).

== Population ==
The area covered by Antrim Borough Council had a population of 53,428 residents according to the 2011 Northern Ireland census.
