= 1997 Coleraine Borough Council election =

Local government election in Northern Ireland

← 1993	21 May 1997	2001 →

All 22 seats to Coleraine Borough Council 12 seats needed for a majority
	First party	Second party	Third party
Party	UUP	DUP	SDLP
Seats won	10	5	3
Seat change	▼2	0	0
	Fourth party	Fifth party
Party	Alliance	Independent
Seats won	3	1
Seat change	▲1	▲1
- Results by district electoral area, shaded by First Preference Votes.

Elections to Coleraine Borough Council were held on 21 May 1997 on the same day as the other Northern Irish local government elections. The election used four district electoral areas to elect a total of 22 councillors.

== Election results ==
Coleraine Borough Council Election Result 1997
Party	Seats	Gains	Losses	Net gain/loss	Seats %	Votes %	Votes	+/−
UUP	10	0	2	▼2	45.5	43.4	8,239	▼7.0
DUP	5	0	0	0	22.7	23.2	4,401	▲1.4
SDLP	3	0	0	0	13.6	16.3	3,091	▲3.6
Alliance	3	1	0	▲1	13.6	9.2	1,738	▼2.6
Independent	1	1	0	▲1	4.5	4.8	909	▲2.8
Ind. Unionist	0	0	0	0	0.0	2.8	530	▲2.8
NI Women's Coalition	0	0	0	0	0.0	0.3	58	New

Note: "Votes" are the first preference votes.

== Districts summary ==
Results of the Coleraine Borough Council election, 1997 by district
Ward	%	Cllrs	%	Cllrs	%	Cllrs	%	Cllrs	%	Cllrs	Total Cllrs
Ward	UUP		DUP		SDLP		Alliance		Others		Total Cllrs
Bann	47.2	3	19.4	1	30.9	2	2.5	0	0.0	0	6
Coleraine Central	49.9	3	24.2	1	14.5	1	10.2	1	1.2	0	6
Coleraine East	32.6	2	37.7	2	0.0	0	12.0	1	17.7	0	5
The Skerries	39.3	2	16.0	1	11.0	0	14.9	1	18.8	1	5
Total	43.4	10	23.2	5	16.3	3	9.2	3	7.9	1	22

== District results ==
=== Bann ===
1993: 3 x UUP, 2 x SDLP, 1 x DUP
1997: 3 x UUP, 2 x SDLP, 1 x DUP
1993-1997 Change: No change

Bann - 6 seats
Party	Candidate	FPv%	Count					
Party	Candidate	FPv%	1	2	3	4	5	6
SDLP	John Dallat*	20.31%	1,234					
UUP	Olive Church*	16.84%	1,023					
UUP	William Watt*	16.29%	990					
SDLP	Eamon Mullan	10.57%	642	990.6				
UUP	William King*	14.07%	855	856.8	963.75			
DUP	Robert Bolton*	10.83%	658	659.2	685.75	708.25	716.05	785.07
DUP	James McCloskey	8.59%	522	524.1	533.7	554	566	613.09
Alliance	Ian McEwan	2.50%	152	157.4	161			
Electorate: 9,982 Valid: 6,076 (60.87%) Spoilt: 112 Quota: 869 Turnout: 6,188 (61.99%)

=== Coleraine Central ===
1993: 3 x UUP, 1 x DUP, 1 x SDLP, 1 x Alliance
1997: 3 x UUP, 1 x DUP, 1 x SDLP, 1 x Alliance
1993-1997 Change: No change

Coleraine Central - 6 seats
Party	Candidate	FPv%	Count							
Party	Candidate	FPv%	1	2	3	4	5	6	7	8
UUP	David McClarty*	24.94%	1,255							
DUP	James McClure*	18.70%	941							
SDLP	Gerry McLaughlin*	14.49%	729							
UUP	David Barbour	10.51%	529	702.8	714.8	724.8				
UUP	Elizabeth Johnston*	8.70%	438	627.64	644.68	668.92	871.92			
Alliance	Eamon O'Hara	5.96%	300	327.72	328.2	542.36	591.44	631.44	640.48	644.32
DUP	Marie McAllister*	5.50%	277	324.96	498.24	502.92	555.72	639.72	640	641.92
UUP	Daniel Christie	5.78%	291	367.56	378.36	389.24				
Alliance	Yvonne Boyle	4.25%	214	226.76	227.48					
NI Women's Coalition	Avril Watson	1.15%	58	63.76	64.68					
Electorate: 10,971 Valid: 5,032 (45.87%) Spoilt: 75 Quota: 719 Turnout: 5,107 (46.55%)

=== Coleraine East ===
1993: 3 x UUP, 2 x DUP
1997: 2 x UUP, 2 x DUP, 1 x Alliance
1993-1997 Change: Alliance gain from UUP

Coleraine East - 5 seats
Party	Candidate	FPv%	Count						
Party	Candidate	FPv%	1	2	3	4	5	6	7
DUP	Maurice Bradley	24.21%	833						
UUP	Elizabeth Black*	17.61%	606						
DUP	William Creelman*	13.48%	464	658.06					
UUP	Robert McPherson	10.32%	355	366.16	389.74	413.1	513.38	554.12	572.32
Alliance	William Mathews*	12.00%	413	416.72	419.42	456.42	462.42	497.02	499.47
Ind. Unionist	David Gilmour*	8.22%	283	303.77	329.87	360.59	391.64	474.71	480.81
Ind. Unionist	Martin Hunter	5.84%	201	214.33	229.81	234.99	259.69		
UUP	Gary Wolfe	4.68%	161	168.44	179.06	191.37			
Independent	Trevor Cooke	3.63%	125	126.55	128.17				
Electorate: 8,639 Valid: 3,441 (39.83%) Spoilt: 69 Quota: 574 Turnout: 3,510 (40.63%)

=== The Skerries ===
1993: 3 x UUP, 1 x DUP, 1 x Alliance
1997: 2 x UUP, 1 x DUP, 1 x Alliance, 1 x Independent
1993-1997 Change: Independent gain from UUP

The Skerries - 5 seats
Party	Candidate	FPv%	Count							
Party	Candidate	FPv%	1	2	3	4	5	6	7	8
UUP	Pauline Armitage*	19.04%	841							
Independent	Christine Alexander	17.75%	784							
UUP	Norman Hillis*	10.64%	470	477	534.6	543.12	570.26	586.4	876.4	
DUP	Robert Stewart*	10.12%	447	450	453.84	457.68	662.52	666.06	786.06	
Alliance	Barbara Dempsey	8.13%	359	362	368.84	379.04	383.34	603.66	625.92	672.92
SDLP	Patricia Farren	11.00%	486	486	486.24	492.36	493.48	537.5	539.8	540.8
UUP	Samuel Kane*	9.62%	425	444	462.6	468.36	489.08	501.44		
Alliance	Patrick McGowan*	6.79%	300	300	304.68	308.76	309.76			
DUP	James Milliken	5.86%	259	264	268.68	271.02				
Ind. Unionist	Thomas Mackay	1.04%	46							
Electorate: 8,975 Valid: 4,417 (49.21%) Spoilt: 92 Quota: 737 Turnout: 4,509 (50.24%)
