= 2001 Coleraine Borough Council election =

Local government election in Northern Ireland

← 1997	7 June 2001	2005 →

All 22 seats to Coleraine Borough Council 12 seats needed for a majority
	First party	Second party	Third party
Party	UUP	DUP	SDLP
Seats won	10	7	4
Seat change	0	▲2	▲1
	Fourth party	Fifth party
Party	Independent	Alliance
Seats won	1	0
Seat change	0	▼3
- Party with the most votes by district.

Elections to Coleraine Borough Council were held on 7 June 2001 on the same day as the other Northern Irish local government elections. The election used four district electoral areas to elect a total of 22 councillors.

== Election results ==
Coleraine Borough Council Election Result 2001
Party	Seats	Gains	Losses	Net gain/loss	Seats %	Votes %	Votes	+/−
UUP	10	0	0	0	45.5	36.0	8,813	▼7.4
DUP	7	2	0	▲2	31.8	27.5	6,743	▲4.3
SDLP	4	1	0	▲1	18.2	19.7	4,837	▲3.4
Independent	1	0	0	0	4.5	9.7	2,377	▲3.6
Alliance	0	0	3	▼3	0.0	6.4	1,579	▼2.8
PUP	0	0	0	0	0.0	0.6	146	▲0.6

Note: "Votes" are the first preference votes.

== Districts summary ==
Results of the Coleraine Borough Council election, 2001 by district
Ward	%	Cllrs	%	Cllrs	%	Cllrs	%	Cllrs	%	Cllrs	Total Cllrs
Ward	UUP		DUP		SDLP		Alliance		Others		Total Cllrs
Bann	34.0	3	20.0	1	30.5	2	1.6	0	13.9	0	6
Coleraine Central	44.7	3	30.4	2	17.6	1	7.3	0	0.0	0	6
Coleraine East	26.7	2	44.2	3	7.8	0	5.7	0	15.6	0	5
The Skerries	35.5	2	19.3	1	18.4	1	12.7	0	14.1	1	5
Total	36.0	10	27.5	7	19.7	4	6.4	0	10.4	1	22

== District results ==
=== Bann ===
1997: 3 x UUP, 2 x SDLP, 1 x DUP
2001: 3 x UUP, 2 x SDLP, 1 x DUP
1997-2001 Change: No change

Bann - 6 seats
Party	Candidate	FPv%	Count					
Party	Candidate	FPv%	1	2	3	4	5	6
SDLP	John Dallat*	23.22%	1,714					
DUP	Adrian McQuillan	16.47%	1,216					
SDLP	Eamon Mullan*	7.25%	535	1,079.07				
UUP	Olive Church*	13.36%	986	989.28	997.86	1,014.27	1,066.73	
UUP	William King*	11.12%	821	826.74	833.76	854.53	961.04	1,156.04
UUP	William Watt*	9.54%	704	708.1	721.62	736.03	816.41	1,024.79
Independent	Reginald McAuley	6.93%	512	589.9	591.2	628.3	643.38	722.47
Independent	Robert Bolton*	6.96%	514	516.87	527.53	540.94	601.22	
DUP	Hazel Sommers	3.59%	265	265.41	377.08	377.21		
Alliance	Yvonne Boyle	1.57%	116	132.81	133.2			
Electorate: 10,232 Valid: 7,383 (72.16%) Spoilt: 160 Quota: 1,055 Turnout: 7,543 (73.72%)

=== Coleraine Central ===
1997: 3 x UUP, 1 x DUP, 1 x SDLP, 1 x Alliance
2001: 3 x UUP, 2 x DUP, 1 x SDLP
1997-2001 Change: DUP gain from Alliance

Coleraine Central - 6 seats
Party	Candidate	FPv%	Count		
Party	Candidate	FPv%	1	2	3
DUP	James McClure*	20.39%	1,426		
UUP	David McClarty*	19.95%	1,395		
SDLP	Gerry McLaughlin*	17.62%	1,232		
UUP	Elizabeth Johnston*	14.53%	1,016		
DUP	Timothy Deans	10.00%	699	1,064.12	
UUP	David Barbour*	10.25%	717	761.8	1,103.56
Alliance	Eamon O'Hara*	7.26%	508	515.36	564.32
Electorate: 11,571 Valid: 6,993 (60.44%) Spoilt: 137 Quota: 1,000 Turnout: 7,130 (61.62%)

=== Coleraine East ===
1997: 2 x DUP, 2 x UUP, 1 x Alliance
2001: 3 x DUP, 2 x UUP
1997-2001 Change: DUP gain from Alliance

Coleraine East - 5 seats
Party	Candidate	FPv%	Count								
Party	Candidate	FPv%	1	2	3	4	5	6	7	8	9
DUP	Maurice Bradley*	29.22%	1,389								
UUP	Elizabeth Black*	17.00%	808								
DUP	William Creelman*	12.54%	596	1,025.57							
UUP	Robert McPherson*	9.68%	460	481.93	486.97	514.98	564.25	593.13	647.14	827.14	
DUP	Phyllis Fielding	2.48%	118	164.87	377.51	400.05	436.69	530.48	543.91	601.56	625.94
SDLP	John Montgomery	7.74%	368	368	368.48	370.91	377.91	379.77	507.63	569.3	578.84
Independent	Thomas Houston	6.71%	319	330.18	332.82	340.68	362.11	375.55	436.98		
Alliance	Patrick McGowan	5.76%	274	277.87	278.11	290.11	298.02	304.45			
Independent	Alistair Crawford	3.13%	149	188.13	191.25	221.07	238.32				
PUP	David Gilmour	3.07%	146	161.91	166.71	188.34					
Independent	Robert Hunter	2.65%	126	143.2	145.6						
Electorate: 8,415 Valid: 4,753 (56.48%) Spoilt: 109 Quota: 793 Turnout: 4,862 (57.78%)

=== The Skerries ===
1997: 2 x UUP, 1 x DUP, 1 x Alliance, 1 x Independent
2001: 2 x UUP, 1 x DUP, 1 x SDLP, 1 x Independent
1997-2001 Change: SDLP gain from Alliance

The Skerries - 5 seats
Party	Candidate	FPv%	Count				
Party	Candidate	FPv%	1	2	3	4	5
SDLP	Billy Leonard	18.41%	988				
DUP	Robert Stewart*	12.58%	675	943			
UUP	Norman Hillis*	11.65%	625	642	643.76	961.76	
UUP	Pauline Armitage*	13.59%	729	753	754.32	859.98	910.73
Independent	Christine Alexander*	14.11%	757	763	782.69	842.13	851.13
Alliance	Barbara Dempsey*	12.69%	681	686	751.89	776.66	782.66
UUP	Samuel Kane	10.29%	552	565	567.53		
DUP	Sandy Gilkinson	6.69%	359				
Electorate: 8,800 Valid: 5,366 (60.98%) Spoilt: 85 Quota: 895 Turnout: 5,451 (61.94%)
