= 1993 Coleraine Borough Council election =

Local government election in Northern Ireland

← 1989	19 May 1993	1997 →

All 22 seats to Coleraine Borough Council 12 seats needed for a majority
	First party	Second party	Third party
Party	UUP	DUP	SDLP
Seats won	12	5	3
Seat change	▲2	0	▲1
	Fourth party	Fifth party	Sixth party
Party	Alliance	Independent	Ind. Unionist
Seats won	2	0	0
Seat change	0	▼1	▼1
- Party with the most votes by district.

Elections to Coleraine Borough Council were held on 19 May 1993 on the same day as the other Northern Irish local government elections. The election used four district electoral areas to elect a total of 22 councillors.

== Election results ==
Coleraine Borough Council Election Result 1993
Party	Seats	Gains	Losses	Net gain/loss	Seats %	Votes %	Votes	+/−
UUP	12	2	0	▲2	54.5	50.4	9,833	▲1.9
DUP	5	0	0	0	22.7	21.8	4,257	▼1.6
SDLP	3	1	0	▲1	13.6	12.7	2,476	▼0.8
Alliance	2	0	0	0	9.1	11.8	2,297	▲3.9
Independent	0	0	0	0	0.0	3.0	382	▼0.1
NI Conservatives	0	0	0	0	0.0	1.3	250	New

Note: "Votes" are the first preference votes.

== Districts summary ==
Results of the Coleraine Borough Council election, 1993 by district
Ward	%	Cllrs	%	Cllrs	%	Cllrs	%	Cllrs	%	Cllrs	Total Cllrs
Ward	UUP		DUP		SDLP		Alliance		Others		Total Cllrs
Bann	55.8	3	12.3	1	29.2	2	2.7	0	0.0	0	6
Coleraine Central	45.9	3	26.9	1	12.1	1	9.4	1	5.7	0	6
Coleraine East	57.8	3	29.7	2	0.0	0	10.2	0	2.3	0	5
The Skerries	42.0	3	23.1	1	29.2	1	0.0	0	5.7	0	5
Total	50.4	12	21.8	5	12.7	3	11.8	2	3.3	0	22

== District results ==
=== Bann ===
1993: 3 x UUP, 2 x SDLP, 1 x DUP

Bann - 6 seats
Party	Candidate	FPv%	Count				
Party	Candidate	FPv%	1	2	3	4	5
UUP	William Watt*	16.92%	1,072				
UUP	Olive Church	16.22%	1,028				
UUP	William King*	15.81%	1,002				
SDLP	John Dallat*	15.29%	969				
SDLP	Gerard O'Kane*	13.89%	880	883.4	916.4		
DUP	Robert Bolton	12.34%	782	820.25	836.42	865.82	879.82
UUP	Robert McPherson	6.83%	433	554.89	622.74	707.7	782.1
Alliance	Ian McEwan	2.70%	171	173.21			
Electorate: 9,793 Valid: 6,337 (64.71%) Spoilt: 142 Quota: 906 Turnout: 6,479 (66.16%)

=== Coleraine Central ===
1993: 3 x UUP, 1 x DUP, 1 x SDLP, 1 x Alliance

Coleraine Central - 6 seats
Party	Candidate	FPv%	Count								
Party	Candidate	FPv%	1	2	3	4	5	6	7	8	9
DUP	James McClure*	23.21%	1,206								
UUP	Robert White*	15.15%	787								
SDLP	Gerry McLaughlin	12.07%	627	629.4	630.4	774.4					
UUP	David McClarty*	10.47%	544	608	614	631.4	640.9	742.6	745.08		
UUP	Elizabeth Johnston	7.45%	387	432.2	434.2	443.6	448.8	600.15	600.15	824.15	
Alliance	William Mathews*	7.10%	369	377	473	544.4	546.85	565.15	592.43	629.68	652.08
DUP	Donald Clifton	3.66%	190	443.2	443.2	449	449.8	482.45	483.07	565.22	623.32
UUP	John Moody	6.47%	336	383.6	385	395.4	410.35	451.9	452.21		
UUP	Daniel Christie	6.33%	329	360.6	361.6	365	370.35				
Independent	Patrick McFeely*	5.79%	301	308.6	314.6						
Alliance	Lara McIlroy	2.29%	119	119.8							
Electorate: 10,293 Valid: 5,195 (50.47%) Spoilt: 83 Quota: 743 Turnout: 5,278 (51.28%)

=== Coleraine East ===
1993: 3 x UUP, 2 x DUP

Coleraine East - 5 seats
Party	Candidate	FPv%	Count				
Party	Candidate	FPv%	1	2	3	4	5
UUP	Elizabeth Black*	22.85%	825				
DUP	William Creelman*	21.16%	764				
UUP	William Glenn	12.05%	435	528.8	541.34	555.86	589.38
UUP	David Gilmour	12.07%	436	511.6	523.92	543.06	584.96
DUP	Marie McAllister*	8.53%	308	321.16	450.52	463.52	491.64
UUP	William Johnston	10.88%	393	412.04	416.88	425.56	465.46
Alliance	Hilary McCartney	6.95%	251	258	258.66	388.28	
Alliance	Amyan MacFayden	3.27%	118	119.96	120.18		
Independent	Trevor Cooke	2.24%	81	90.52	91.84		
Electorate: 8,017 Valid: 3,611 (45.04%) Spoilt: 125 Quota: 602 Turnout: 3,736 (46.60%)

=== The Skerries ===
1993: 3 x UUP, 1 x DUP, 1 x Alliance

The Skerries - 5 seats
Party	Candidate	FPv%	Count			
Party	Candidate	FPv%	1	2	3	4
DUP	Robert Stewart*	20.89%	909			
Alliance	Patrick McGowan*	19.60%	853			
UUP	Pauline Armitage*	17.74%	772			
UUP	Samuel Kane	12.50%	544	582.22	585.58	732.71
UUP	Norman Hillis	11.72%	510	544.23	550.79	727.56
Alliance	Kate Condy	9.56%	416	419.57	525.65	553.36
NI Conservatives	Robert Mitchell*	5.74%	250	268.27	275.47	
DUP	Siobhan Watterson	2.25%	98	185.15	185.95	
Electorate: 8,857 Valid: 4,352 (49.14%) Spoilt: 123 Quota: 726 Turnout: 4,475 (50.53%)
