= Coleraine Town (District Electoral Area) =

District electoral areas in Coleraine, Northern Ireland

Coleraine Town was one of the three district electoral areas in Coleraine, Northern Ireland which existed from 1985 to 1993. The district elected seven members to Coleraine Borough Council, and formed part of the East Londonderry constituencies for the Northern Ireland Assembly and UK Parliament.

It was created for the 1985 local elections, replacing Coleraine Area C which had existed since 1973, and contained the wards of Ballysally, Central, Churchland, Cross Glebe, Mount Sandel, university and Waterside. It was abolished for the 1993 local elections, with Central, Churchland, Mount Sandel and Waterside moving to the new Coleraine Central DEA and Ballysally, Cross Glebe and University moving to the new Coleraine East DEA.

== Councillors ==
Election	Councillor (Party)	Councillor (Party)	Councillor (Party)	Councillor (Party)	Councillor (Party)	Councillor (Party)	Councillor (Party)
1989	Patrick McFeely (Independent)	William Mathews (Alliance)	Robert White (UUP)	Gladys Black (UUP)	David McClarty (UUP)	Marie McAllister (DUP)	James McClure (DUP)
1985	Patrick McFeely (Independent)	William Mathews (Alliance)	Robert White (UUP)	Gladys Black (UUP)	Robert Bolton (DUP)	Marie McAllister (DUP)	James McClure (DUP)

== 1989 Election ==
1985: 3 x DUP, 2 x UUP, 1 x Alliance, 1 x Independent

1989: 3 x UUP, 2 x DUP, 1 x Alliance, 1 x Independent

1985-1989 Change: UUP gain from DUP

Coleraine Town - 7 seats
Party	Candidate	FPv%	Count						
Party	Candidate	FPv%	1	2	3	4	5	6	7
DUP	James McClure*	28.97%	1,790						
UUP	Robert White*	18.27%	1,129						
UUP	Gladys Black*	13.24%	818						
UUP	David McClarty	9.83%	607	743.4	1,006.9				
DUP	Marie McAllister*	3.03%	187	759.88	788.78				
Independent	Patrick McFeely*	6.56%	405	424.22	431.36	434.88	452.56	499.9	765.9
Alliance	William Mathews*	6.44%	398	419.08	446.96	456.16	489.14	631	720
DUP	William Thompson	1.91%	118	372.2	392.94	418.46	516.38	538.88	540.88
SDLP	Gerry McLaughlin	7.01%	433	434.86	436.22	436.54	437.22	468.38	
Labour Party NI	Timothy Blackman	1.62%	100	103.72	105.42	106.62	109.34		
Alliance	Yvonne Boyle	1.59%	98	98.62	99.98	101.1	105.18		
Green (NI)	David Garland	0.91%	56	56.62	57.98	58.54	60.92		
Workers' Party	Rosemary McBride	0.63%	39	40.86	42.22	42.7	44.06		
Electorate: 12,216 Valid: 6,178 (50.57%) Spoilt: 151 Quota: 773 Turnout: 6,329 (51.81%)

== 1985 Election ==
1985: 3 x DUP, 2 x UUP, 1 x Alliance, 1 x Independent

Coleraine Town - 7 seats
Party	Candidate	FPv%	Count											
Party	Candidate	FPv%	1	2	3	4	5	6	7	8	9	10	11	12
DUP	James McClure*	38.12%	2,444											
UUP	Robert White*	16.06%	1,030											
Independent	Patrick McFeely	9.11%	584	613.24	617.64	633.86	654.54	655.44	864.44					
UUP	Gladys Black	5.74%	368	456.4	549.46	550.68	552.36	559.92	560.92	561.84	610.86	845.86		
DUP	Robert Bolton*	0.92%	59	674.4	678.58	679.58	683.84	751.4	751.4	751.4	785.62	827.82		
Alliance	William Mathews	6.53%	419	440.08	451.74	514.42	536.42	537.78	584.46	617.12	658.42	712.6	723.62	723.62
DUP	Marie McAllister	2.14%	137	470.2	475.04	475.72	480.4	581.86	581.86	581.86	606.76	676.88	696.6	712.92
Independent	William McNabb*	4.37%	280	408.52	425.9	428.58	440.26	443.2	452.2	469.68	611.62	676.94	689.7	693.1
UUP	Stephen Smyth	5.15%	330	445.6	511.16	515.16	519.84	539.46	539.46	540.38	577.42			
Independent	Randall Crawford*	3.76%	241	338.24	355.84	359.84	379.52	385.36	397.36	407.48				
SDLP	Deirdre Busby	4.46%	286	286.68	286.68	289.68	307.68	307.68						
DUP	Geoffrey Whitehead	0.44%	28	212.96	216.92	216.92	217.6							
Labour Party NI	Timothy Blackman	1.72%	110	118.16	118.6	119.6								
Alliance	Colm McCloskey	1.50%	96	98.04	98.7									
Electorate: 11,221 Valid: 6,412 (57.14%) Spoilt: 130 Quota: 802 Turnout: 6,542 (58.30%)
