= 1989 Coleraine Borough Council election =

Local government election in Northern Ireland

← 1985	17 May 1989	1993 →

All 21 seats to Coleraine Borough Council 12 seats needed for a majority
	First party	Second party	Third party
Party	UUP	DUP	SDLP
Seats won	10	5	2
Seat change	0	▼1	0
	Fourth party	Fifth party	Sixth party
Party	Alliance	Independent	Ind. Unionist
Seats won	2	1	1
Seat change	0	0	▲1

Elections to Coleraine Borough Council were held on 17 May 1989 on the same day as the other Northern Irish local government elections. The election used three district electoral areas to elect a total of 21 councillors.

== Election results ==
Coleraine Borough Council Election Result 1989
Party	Seats	Gains	Losses	Net gain/loss	Seats %	Votes %	Votes	+/−
UUP	10	1	1	0	47.6	48.5	9,420	▲5.6
DUP	5	0	1	▼1	23.8	23.4	4,556	▼7.1
SDLP	2	0	0	0	9.5	13.5	2,632	▲0.6
Alliance	2	0	0	0	9.5	7.9	1,510	▲1.7
Ind. Unionist	1	1	0	▲1	4.8	2.6	509	▲4.8
Independent	0	0	0	0	0.0	2.1	405	▼3.3
Labour Party NI	0	0	0	0	0.0	1.2	234	New
Green (NI)	0	0	0	0	0.0	0.6	127	▲0.6
Workers' Party	0	0	0	0	0.0	0.2	39	▲0.2

Note: "Votes" are the first preference votes.

== Districts summary ==
Results of the Coleraine Borough Council election, 1989 by district
Ward	%	Cllrs	%	Cllrs	%	Cllrs	%	Cllrs	%	Cllrs	Total Cllrs
Ward	UUP		DUP		SDLP		Alliance		Others		Total Cllrs
Bann	59.2	4	13.6	1	24.4	2	2.8	0	0.0	0	7
Coleraine Town	41.3	3	33.9	2	7.0	0	8.0	1	9.8	1	7
The Skerries	43.4	3	24.2	2	7.8	0	13.1	1	11.5	1	7
Total	48.5	10	23.4	5	13.5	2	7.9	2	6.7	2	21

== District results ==
=== Bann ===
1985: 4 x UUP, 2 x SDLP, 1 x DUP
1989: 4 x UUP, 2 x SDLP, 1 x DUP
1985-1989 Change: No change

Bann - 7 seats
Party	Candidate	FPv%	Count				
Party	Candidate	FPv%	1	2	3	4	5
UUP	William King*	18.82%	1,326				
UUP	William Watt*	16.82%	1,185				
UUP	Creighton Hutchinson*	16.04%	1,130				
SDLP	John Dallat*	15.50%	1,092				
DUP	Robert Catherwood*	13.56%	955				
UUP	John Moody*	7.50%	528	957.4			
SDLP	Gerard O'Kane*	8.87%	625	626.9	680.9	710.9	909.1
Alliance	Ian McEwan	2.88%	203	215.54	384.54	594.54	601.54
Electorate: 11,366 Valid: 7,044 (61.97%) Spoilt: 201 Quota: 881 Turnout: 7,245 (63.74%)

=== Coleraine Town ===
1985: 3 x DUP, 2 x UUP, 1 x Alliance, 1 x Independent
1989: 3 x UUP, 2 x DUP, 1 x Alliance, 1 x Independent
1985-1989 Change: UUP gain from DUP

Coleraine Town - 7 seats
Party	Candidate	FPv%	Count						
Party	Candidate	FPv%	1	2	3	4	5	6	7
DUP	James McClure*	28.97%	1,790						
UUP	Robert White*	18.27%	1,129						
UUP	Gladys Black*	13.24%	818						
UUP	David McClarty	9.83%	607	743.4	1,006.9				
DUP	Marie McAllister*	3.03%	187	759.88	788.78				
Independent	Patrick McFeely*	6.56%	405	424.22	431.36	434.88	452.56	499.9	765.9
Alliance	William Mathews*	6.44%	398	419.08	446.96	456.16	489.14	631	720
DUP	William Thompson	1.91%	118	372.2	392.94	418.46	516.38	538.88	540.88
SDLP	Gerry McLaughlin	7.01%	433	434.86	436.22	436.54	437.22	468.38	
Labour Party NI	Timothy Blackman	1.62%	100	103.72	105.42	106.62	109.34		
Alliance	Yvonne Boyle	1.59%	98	98.62	99.98	101.1	105.18		
Green (NI)	David Garland	0.91%	56	56.62	57.98	58.54	60.92		
Workers' Party	Rosemary McBride	0.63%	39	40.86	42.22	42.7	44.06		
Electorate: 12,216 Valid: 6,178 (50.57%) Spoilt: 151 Quota: 773 Turnout: 6,329 (51.81%)

=== The Skerries ===
1985: 4 x UUP, 2 x DUP, 1 x Alliance
1989: 3 x UUP, 2 x DUP, 1 x Alliance, 1 x Independent Unionist
1985-1989 Change: Independent Unionist leaves UUP

The Skerries - 7 seats
Party	Candidate	FPv%	Count							
Party	Candidate	FPv%	1	2	3	4	5	6	7	8
UUP	Pauline Armitage*	13.53%	840							
UUP	Elizabeth Black*	12.35%	767	795.42						
Alliance	Patrick McGowan*	7.95%	494	496.59	553.66	834.66				
DUP	William Creelman*	11.66%	724	727.22	734.22	735.22	736.12	845.12		
UUP	William Glenn*	11.66%	658	673.12	678.19	685.54	695.74	716.02	936.02	
DUP	Robert Stewart	6.49%	403	403.63	408.63	409.63	409.63	611.81	714.39	771.39
Ind. Unionist	Robert Mitchell*	8.20%	509	511.1	520.1	533.1	547.8	574.94	666.77	741.77
SDLP	Sean Farren	7.76%	482	482.21	537.21	559.21	584.71	584.71	588.01	589.01
UUP	Thomas Peacock	6.96%	432	435.99	443.06	447.06	450.96	469.96		
DUP	Eric Stewart	6.10%	379	379.77	384.77	384.77	385.97			
Alliance	Kate Condy	5.10%	317	317.49	346.49					
Labour Party NI	Roberta Woods	2.16%	134	134.21						
Green (NI)	Malcolm Samuels	1.14%	71	71						
Electorate: 11,940 Valid: 6,210 (52.01%) Spoilt: 149 Quota: 777 Turnout: 6,359 (53.26%)
