= The Skerries (District Electoral Area) =

District electoral areas in Coleraine, Northern Ireland

The Skerries was one of the district electoral areas in Coleraine, Northern Ireland which existed from 1985 to 2014, one of three DEAs from 1985 to 1993 and one of four DEAs from 1993 to 2014. The district elected seven members to Coleraine Borough Council until 1993, and five until 2014, and formed part of the East Londonderry constituencies for the Northern Ireland Assembly and UK Parliament.

The Skerries DEA (1993-2014) within Coleraine

It was created for the 1985 local elections, replacing Coleraine Area B which had existed since 1973, and contained the wards of Atlantic, Dunluce, Hopefield, Knockantern, Portstewart, Royal Portrush and Strand. For the 1993 local elections, it was reduced by two wards, losing the Dunluce area to the new Coleraine East DEA. It was abolished for the 2014 local elections and replaced with the new Causeway DEA.

== Councillors ==
Election	Councillor (Party)	Councillor (Party)	Councillor (Party)	Councillor (Party)	Councillor (Party)	Councillor (Party)	Councillor (Party)
2011	Maura Hickey (SDLP)	Christine Alexander (Independent)	Norman Hillis (UUP)	Barney Fitzpatrick (Alliance)	Mark Fielding (DUP)	5 seats 1993–2014	5 seats 1993–2014
2005	Maura Hickey (SDLP)	Christine Alexander (Independent)	Norman Hillis (UUP)	Sandy Gilkinson (DUP)	Robert Stewart (DUP)	5 seats 1993–2014	5 seats 1993–2014
2001	Billy Leonard (SDLP)	Christine Alexander (Independent)	Norman Hillis (UUP)	Pauline Armitage (UUP)	Robert Stewart (DUP)	5 seats 1993–2014	5 seats 1993–2014
1997	Barbara Dempsey (Alliance)	Christine Alexander (Independent)	Norman Hillis (UUP)	Pauline Armitage (UUP)	Robert Stewart (DUP)	5 seats 1993–2014	5 seats 1993–2014
1993	Patrick McGowan (Alliance)	Samuel Kane (UUP)	Norman Hillis (UUP)	Pauline Armitage (UUP)	Robert Stewart (DUP)	5 seats 1993–2014	5 seats 1993–2014
1989	Patrick McGowan (Alliance)	Elizabeth Black (UUP)	William Glenn (UUP)	Pauline Armitage (UUP)	Robert Stewart (DUP)	William Creelman (DUP)	Robert Mitchell (UUP)/ (Independent Unionist)
1985	Patrick McGowan (Alliance)	Elizabeth Black (UUP)	William Glenn (UUP)	Pauline Armitage (UUP)	Matthew Kane (DUP)	William Creelman (DUP)	Robert Mitchell (UUP)/ (Independent Unionist)

== 2011 Election ==
2005: 2 x DUP, 1 x UUP, 1 x SDLP, 1 x Independent

2011: 1 x DUP, 1 x UUP, 1 x Alliance, 1 x SDLP, 1 x Independent

2005-2011 Change: Alliance gain from DUP

The Skerries - 5 seats
Party	Candidate	FPv%	Count							
Party	Candidate	FPv%	1	2	3	4	5	6	7	8
Alliance	Barney Fitzpatrick	15.99%	635	636	649	676				
Independent	Christine Alexander*	14.85%	590	594	651	670				
DUP	Mark Fielding	14.15%	562	572	593	594	594.61	618.61	823.61	
UUP	Norman Hillis*	10.45%	415	424	447	448	448	624	688	
SDLP	Maura Hickey*	8.61%	342	342	348	534	544.98	552.98	560.98	571.98
Independent	Noel Kennedy	8.41%	334	352	391	398	399.22	423.22	431.22	466.22
DUP	Sandy Gilkinson*	6.65%	264	281	299	299	299	324		
UUP	Lesley MacAuley	6.62%	263	267	291	291	291			
Sinn Féin	Christopher O'Neill	6.92%	275	275	280					
Independent	James Davies	2.92%	116	117						
UKIP	Adrian Parke	2.29%	91	105						
TUV	Michael Wiggins	2.14%	85							
Electorate: 8,167 Valid: 3,972 (48.63%) Spoilt: 62 Quota: 663 Turnout: 4,034 (49.39%)

== 2005 Election ==
2001: 2 x UUP, 1 x DUP, 1 x SDLP, 1 x Independent

2005: 2 x DUP, 1 x UUP, 1 x SDLP, 1 x Independent

2001-2005 Change: DUP gain from UUP

The Skerries - 5 seats
Party	Candidate	FPv%	Count					
Party	Candidate	FPv%	1	2	3	4	5	6
Independent	Christine Alexander*	17.99%	846					
DUP	Robert Stewart*	16.44%	773	778	779	786.92		
UUP	Norman Hillis*	14.82%	697	733	737	749.72	1,065.72	
SDLP	Maura Hickey	8.89%	418	441	698	706.08	718.56	734.56
DUP	Sandy Gilkinson	11.68%	549	557	557	561.72	634.2	733.2
Alliance	Barney Fitzpatrick	9.68%	455	500	540	560.16	613.88	706.88
UUP	Stephen Barr	9.57%	450	477	479	486.76		
Sinn Féin	Valerie Leonard	7.49%	352	356				
Independent	Barbara Dempsey	3.45%	162					
Electorate: 8,162 Valid: 4,702 (57.61%) Spoilt: 65 Quota: 784 Turnout: 4,767 (58.40%)

== 2001 Election ==
1997: 2 x UUP, 1 x DUP, 1 x Alliance, 1 x Independent

2001: 2 x UUP, 1 x DUP, 1 x SDLP, 1 x Independent

1997-2001 Change: SDLP gain from Alliance

The Skerries - 5 seats
Party	Candidate	FPv%	Count				
Party	Candidate	FPv%	1	2	3	4	5
SDLP	Billy Leonard	18.41%	988				
DUP	Robert Stewart*	12.58%	675	943			
UUP	Norman Hillis*	11.65%	625	642	643.76	961.76	
UUP	Pauline Armitage*	13.59%	729	753	754.32	859.98	910.73
Independent	Christine Alexander*	14.11%	757	763	782.69	842.13	851.13
Alliance	Barbara Dempsey*	12.69%	681	686	751.89	776.66	782.66
UUP	Samuel Kane	10.29%	552	565	567.53		
DUP	Sandy Gilkinson	6.69%	359				
Electorate: 8,800 Valid: 5,366 (60.98%) Spoilt: 85 Quota: 895 Turnout: 5,451 (61.94%)

== 1997 Election ==
1993: 3 x UUP, 1 x DUP, 1 x Alliance

1997: 2 x UUP, 1 x DUP, 1 x Alliance, 1 x Independent

1993-1997 Change: Independent gain from UUP

The Skerries - 5 seats
Party	Candidate	FPv%	Count							
Party	Candidate	FPv%	1	2	3	4	5	6	7	8
UUP	Pauline Armitage*	19.04%	841							
Independent	Christine Alexander	17.75%	784							
UUP	Norman Hillis*	10.64%	470	477	534.6	543.12	570.26	586.4	876.4	
DUP	Robert Stewart*	10.12%	447	450	453.84	457.68	662.52	666.06	786.06	
Alliance	Barbara Dempsey	8.13%	359	362	368.84	379.04	383.34	603.66	625.92	672.92
SDLP	Patricia Farren	11.00%	486	486	486.24	492.36	493.48	537.5	539.8	540.8
UUP	Samuel Kane*	9.62%	425	444	462.6	468.36	489.08	501.44		
Alliance	Patrick McGowan*	6.79%	300	300	304.68	308.76	309.76			
DUP	James Milliken	5.86%	259	264	268.68	271.02				
Ind. Unionist	Thomas Mackay	1.04%	46							
Electorate: 8,975 Valid: 4,417 (49.21%) Spoilt: 92 Quota: 737 Turnout: 4,509 (50.24%)

== 1993 Election ==
1993: 3 x UUP, 1 x DUP, 1 x Alliance

The Skerries - 5 seats
Party	Candidate	FPv%	Count			
Party	Candidate	FPv%	1	2	3	4
DUP	Robert Stewart*	20.89%	909			
Alliance	Patrick McGowan*	19.60%	853			
UUP	Pauline Armitage*	17.74%	772			
UUP	Samuel Kane	12.50%	544	582.22	585.58	732.71
UUP	Norman Hillis	11.72%	510	544.23	550.79	727.56
Alliance	Kate Condy	9.56%	416	419.57	525.65	553.36
NI Conservatives	Robert Mitchell*	5.74%	250	268.27	275.47	
DUP	Siobhan Watterson	2.25%	98	185.15	185.95	
Electorate: 8,857 Valid: 4,352 (49.14%) Spoilt: 123 Quota: 726 Turnout: 4,475 (50.53%)

== 1989 Election ==
1985: 4 x UUP, 2 x DUP, 1 x Alliance

1989: 3 x UUP, 2 x DUP, 1 x Alliance, 1 x Independent Unionist

1985-1989 Change: Independent Unionist leaves UUP

The Skerries - 7 seats
Party	Candidate	FPv%	Count							
Party	Candidate	FPv%	1	2	3	4	5	6	7	8
UUP	Pauline Armitage*	13.53%	840							
UUP	Elizabeth Black*	12.35%	767	795.42						
Alliance	Patrick McGowan*	7.95%	494	496.59	553.66	834.66				
DUP	William Creelman*	11.66%	724	727.22	734.22	735.22	736.12	845.12		
UUP	William Glenn*	11.66%	658	673.12	678.19	685.54	695.74	716.02	936.02	
DUP	Robert Stewart	6.49%	403	403.63	408.63	409.63	409.63	611.81	714.39	771.39
Ind. Unionist	Robert Mitchell*	8.20%	509	511.1	520.1	533.1	547.8	574.94	666.77	741.77
SDLP	Sean Farren	7.76%	482	482.21	537.21	559.21	584.71	584.71	588.01	589.01
UUP	Thomas Peacock	6.96%	432	435.99	443.06	447.06	450.96	469.96		
DUP	Eric Stewart	6.10%	379	379.77	384.77	384.77	385.97			
Alliance	Kate Condy	5.10%	317	317.49	346.49					
Labour Party NI	Roberta Woods	2.16%	134	134.21						
Green (NI)	Malcolm Samuels	1.14%	71	71						
Electorate: 11,940 Valid: 6,210 (52.01%) Spoilt: 149 Quota: 777 Turnout: 6,359 (53.26%)

== 1985 Election ==
1985: 4 x UUP, 2 x DUP, 1 x Alliance

The Skerries - 7 seats
Party	Candidate	FPv%	Count									
Party	Candidate	FPv%	1	2	3	4	5	6	7	8	9	10
DUP	William Creelman*	16.76%	1,056									
UUP	William Glenn*	10.76%	678	693	693.25	714.5	719.5	733	806			
Alliance	Patrick McGowan*	8.63%	544	545.25	553.25	555.25	739.25	740.25	758.25	799.25		
UUP	Elizabeth Black	10.00%	630	636.5	638.5	648.5	655.75	659.5	725	795		
DUP	Matthew Kane*	4.68%	295	362	364	379	380	581	600	633	973	
UUP	Pauline Armitage	8.22%	518	522.5	523.5	532.5	535.5	538.5	570.75	737.25	790.25	
UUP	Robert Mitchell*	4.87%	307	311.5	312.5	381.75	385.75	396	500.75	563.75	635.25	772.25
SDLP	Sean Farren	9.09%	573	573.5	587.5	587.5	591.5	591.5	591.5	593	593	594
DUP	Robert Stewart	5.94%	374	397.5	397.5	415.25	418.25	477.75	496	523.75		
UUP	Hugh Stewart	6.00%	378	386	386	400.5	401.5	408.75	421.25			
UUP	Albert Clarke*	5.06%	319	322.25	322.25	348.25	352.25	355.25				
DUP	Roy Hilldrup	2.78%	175	301.5	301.5	306.5	307.5					
Alliance	Peter Scott	3.25%	205	205.25	215.25	227.25						
UUP	William Robinson	3.25%	205	206.75	207.75							
Green (NI)	Margaret O'Neill	0.70%	44	44.25								
Electorate: 11,156 Valid: 6,301 (56.48%) Spoilt: 113 Quota: 788 Turnout: 6,414 (57.49%)
