= Bann (District Electoral Area) =

District electoral area in Northern Ireland

- Causeway Coast and Glens Borough Council DEA constituency

Current constituency
- Created: 1985
- Seats: 7 (1985-1993); 6 (1993-2014); 7 (2014-)
- Councillors: Ciarán Archibald (SF); Sean Bateson (SF); Richard Holmes (UUP); Dawn Huggins (DUP); Michelle Knight-McQuillan (DUP)

Bann DEA within Causeway Coast and Glens

Bann DEA (1993–2014) within Coleraine

Bann is one of the seven district electoral areas (DEA) in Causeway Coast and Glens, Northern Ireland. The district elects five members to Causeway Coast and Glens Borough Council and contains the wards of Aghadowey, Castlerock, Garvagh, Kilrea and Macosquin. Bann forms part of the East Londonderry constituencies for the Northern Ireland Assembly and UK Parliament.

It was created for the 1985 local elections, replacing Coleraine Area A which had existed since 1973, where it contained seven wards (Agivey, Castlerock, Garvagh, Kilrea, Macosquin, Ringsent and The Cuts). For the 1993 local elections it was reduced to six wards, losing The Cuts to the new Coleraine Central DEA. For the 2014 local elections it was reduced to five wards.

== Councillors ==
Election	Councillor (Party)	Councillor (Party)	Councillor (Party)	Councillor (Party)	Councillor (Party)	Councillor (Party)	Councillor (Party)
2023	Ciarán Archibald (Sinn Féin)	Sean Bateson (Sinn Féin)	Richard Holmes (UUP)	Dawn Huggins (DUP)	Michelle Knight-McQuillan (DUP)	5 seats 2014–present	6 seats 1993–2014
February 2023 Defection	Helena Dallat O'Driscoll (SDLP)	Sean Bateson (Sinn Féin)	Richard Holmes (UUP)	Adrian McQuillan (DUP)/ (Independent)	Michelle Knight-McQuillan (DUP)	5 seats 2014–present	6 seats 1993–2014
2019	Helena Dallat O'Driscoll (SDLP)	Sean Bateson (Sinn Féin)	Richard Holmes (UUP)	Adrian McQuillan (DUP)/ (Independent)	Michelle Knight-McQuillan (DUP)	5 seats 2014–present	6 seats 1993–2014
2014	Róisín Loftus (SDLP)	William King (UUP)	Richard Holmes (UUP)	Sam Cole (DUP)	Michelle Knight-McQuillan (DUP)	5 seats 2014–present	6 seats 1993–2014
2011	Róisín Loftus (SDLP)	William King (UUP)	Richard Holmes (UUP)	Sam Cole (DUP)	Adrian McQuillan (DUP)	Ciarán Archibald (Sinn Féin)	6 seats 1993–2014
2005	John Dallat (SDLP)	William King (UUP)	Olive Church (UUP)	Sam Cole (DUP)	Adrian McQuillan (DUP)	Billy Leonard (Sinn Féin)	6 seats 1993–2014
2001	John Dallat (SDLP)	William King (UUP)	Olive Church (UUP)	William Watt (UUP)	Adrian McQuillan (DUP)	Eamon Mullan (SDLP)	6 seats 1993–2014
1997	John Dallat (SDLP)	William King (UUP)	Olive Church (UUP)	William Watt (UUP)	Robert Bolton (DUP)	Eamon Mullan (SDLP)	6 seats 1993–2014
1993	John Dallat (SDLP)	William King (UUP)	Olive Church (UUP)	William Watt (UUP)	Robert Bolton (DUP)	Gerard O'Kane (SDLP)	6 seats 1993–2014
1989	John Dallat (SDLP)	William King (UUP)	Creighton Hutchinson (UUP)	William Watt (UUP)	Robert Catherwood (DUP)	Gerard O'Kane (SDLP)	John Moody (UUP)
1985	John Dallat (SDLP)	William King (UUP)	Creighton Hutchinson (UUP)	William Watt (UUP)	Robert Catherwood (DUP)	Gerard O'Kane (SDLP)	John Moody (UUP)

== 2023 Election ==
2019: 2 x DUP, 1 x UUP, 1 x Sinn Féin, 1 x SDLP

2023: 2 x DUP, 2 x Sinn Féin, 1 x UUP

2019–2023 Change: Sinn Féin gain from SDLP

Bann - 5 seats
Party	Candidate	FPv%	Count							
Party	Candidate	FPv%	1	2	3	4	5	6	7	8
Sinn Féin	Sean Bateson*	16.13%	1,277	1,312.00	1,450.00					
DUP	Michelle Knight-McQuillan*	13.31%	1,054	1,054.00	1,057.00	1,160.00	1,160.00	1,183.00	1,523.00	
DUP	Dawn Huggins	10.75%	851	853.00	856.00	985.00	985.00	1,009.00	1,144.00	1,283.50
Sinn Féin	Ciarán Archibald	10.89%	862	898.00	1,006.00	1,006.00	1,122.00	1,258.00	1,272.00	1,272.62
UUP	Richard Holmes*	9.88%	782	788.00	793.00	889.00	889.00	1,009.00	1,200.00	1,238.44
UUP	Andrew Kerr	9.60%	760	768.00	770.00	815.00	815.00	964.00	1,042.00	1,064.32
Independent	Adrian McQuillan*	8.85%	701	715.00	724.00	789.00	791.00	883.00		
Alliance	Joe Hutchinson	7.24%	573	693.00	746.00	755.00	766.00			
TUV	William Craig	5.76%	456	461.00	463.00					
Aontú	Gemma Brolly	4.24%	336	364.00						
SDLP	Ryan Barkley	2.19%	173							
Green (NI)	Jen McCahon	1.16%	92							
Electorate: 13,347 Valid: 7,917 (59.32%) Spoilt: 70 Quota: 1,320 Turnout: 7,987 (59.84%)

== 2019 Election ==
2014: 2 x DUP, 2 x UUP, 1 x SDLP

2019: 2 x DUP, 1 x UUP, 1 x SDLP, 1 x Sinn Féin

2014-2019 Change: Sinn Féin gain from UUP

Bann - 5 seats
Party	Candidate	FPv%	Count				
Party	Candidate	FPv%	1	2	3	4	5
Sinn Féin	Sean Bateson	19.29%	1,403				
DUP	Adrian McQuillan ‡	14.40%	1,047	1,048.12	1,173.12	1,180.28	1,307.28
UUP	Richard Holmes*	13.26%	964	964.8	1055.8	1,121.6	1,248.6
DUP	Michelle Knight-McQuillan*	10.74%	781	781.48	862.48	870.48	1,241.48
SDLP	Helena Dallat O'Driscoll	9.43%	686	846.16	853.16	1,138.44	1,144.6
UUP	William King*	10.99%	799	799	848	922	986
DUP	Sam Cole*	8.79%	639	639.48	714.48	721.64	
Alliance	Charlie McConaghy	6.75%	491	511.64	522.64		
PUP	Timmy Reid	3.45%	251	251			
TUV	Elizabeth Collins	2.94%	214	214			
Electorate: 12,656 Valid: 7,272 (57.45%) Spoilt: 78 Quota: 1,213 Turnout: 7,275 (58.07%)

== 2014 Election ==
2011: 2 x DUP, 2 x UUP, 1 x Sinn Féin, 1 x SDLP

2014: 2 x UUP, 2 x DUP, 1 x SDLP

2011-2014 Change: Sinn Féin loss due to the reduction of one seat

Bann - 5 seats
Party	Candidate	FPv%	Count					
Party	Candidate	FPv%	1	2	3	4	5	6
UUP	William King*	17.13%	1,127					
DUP	Michelle Knight-McQuillan*	15.58%	1,025	1,166				
UUP	Richard Holmes*	13.38%	880	1,140				
DUP	Sam Cole*	13.56%	892	1,063	1,127.66			
SDLP	Róisín Loftus*	13.30%	875	981	984.66	1,023.36	1,030.07	1,057.79
Sinn Féin	Ciaran Archibald*	15.11%	994	1,010	1,010	1,014.3	1,014.3	1,015.84
TUV	Elizabeth Collins	8.36%	550					
Alliance	Charlie McConaghy	3.57%	235					
Electorate: 12,175 Valid: 6,578 (54.03%) Spoilt: 77 Quota: 1,097 Turnout: 6,655 (54.66%)

== 2011 Election ==
2005: 2 x DUP, 2 x UUP, 1 x Sinn Féin, 1 x SDLP

2011: 2 x DUP, 2 x UUP, 1 x Sinn Féin, 1 x SDLP

2005-2011 Change: No change

Bann - 6 seats
Party	Candidate	FPv%	Count							
Party	Candidate	FPv%	1	2	3	4	5	6	7	8
DUP	Adrian McQuillan*	22.04%	1,440							
Sinn Féin	Ciaran Archibald	16.47%	1,076							
UUP	William King*	14.35%	938							
DUP	Sam Cole*	9.53%	623	860.96	861.68	940.68				
SDLP	Roisin Loftus	8.91%	582	583.44	656.7	658.7	701.42	701.42	711.86	1,070.86
UUP	Richard Holmes	5.55%	363	379.2	379.38	440.26	480.62	481.72	838.48	846.38
DUP	Angela Torrens	3.41%	223	429.64	429.82	465.78	491.78	496.08	542	554.98
SDLP	Eamon Mullan	6.41%	419	421.16	483.26	484.26	525.06	525.26	526.26	
UUP	Rosemary Torrens	5.60%	366	395.52	395.52	434.24	470.6	471.4		
Alliance	Charlie McConaghy	4.07%	266	267.44	271.04	272.4				
TUV	Elizabeth Collins	3.66%	239	248	248.18					
Electorate: 10,978 Valid: 6,535 (59.53%) Spoilt: 110 Quota: 934 Turnout: 6,645 (60.53%)

== 2005 Election ==
2001: 3 x UUP, 2 x SDLP, 1 x DUP

2005: 2 x DUP, 2 x UUP, 1 x Sinn Féin, 1 x SDLP

2001-2005 Change: DUP and Sinn Féin gain from UUP and SDLP

Bann - 6 seats
Party	Candidate	FPv%	Count				
Party	Candidate	FPv%	1	2	3	4	5
SDLP	John Dallat*	12.88%	901	1,326			
Sinn Féin	Billy Leonard	12.79%	895	925	1,161		
DUP	Sam Cole*	11.68%	817	817	817	818	1,175
DUP	Adrian McQuillan*	14.10%	986	986	988	990	1,139
UUP	William King*	12.77%	893	896	907	912	949
UUP	Olive Church*	13.12%	918	920	924	933	947
UUP	William Watt*	7.75%	542	544	570	601	609
DUP	Mark Fielding	8.19%	573	573	574	574	
SDLP	Eamon Mullan*	6.72%	470				
Electorate: 10,299 Valid: 6,995 (67.92%) Spoilt: 121 Quota: 1,000 Turnout: 7,116 (69.09%)

== 2001 Election ==
1997: 3 x UUP, 2 x SDLP, 1 x DUP

2001: 3 x UUP, 2 x SDLP, 1 x DUP

1997-2001 Change: No change

Bann - 6 seats
Party	Candidate	FPv%	Count					
Party	Candidate	FPv%	1	2	3	4	5	6
SDLP	John Dallat*	23.22%	1,714					
DUP	Adrian McQuillan	16.47%	1,216					
SDLP	Eamon Mullan*	7.25%	535	1,079.07				
UUP	Olive Church*	13.36%	986	989.28	997.86	1,014.27	1,066.73	
UUP	William King*	11.12%	821	826.74	833.76	854.53	961.04	1,156.04
UUP	William Watt*	9.54%	704	708.1	721.62	736.03	816.41	1,024.79
Independent	Reginald McAuley	6.93%	512	589.9	591.2	628.3	643.38	722.47
Independent	Robert Bolton*	6.96%	514	516.87	527.53	540.94	601.22	
DUP	Hazel Sommers	3.59%	265	265.41	377.08	377.21		
Alliance	Yvonne Boyle	1.57%	116	132.81	133.2			
Electorate: 10,232 Valid: 7,383 (72.16%) Spoilt: 160 Quota: 1,055 Turnout: 7,543 (73.72%)

== 1997 Election ==
1993: 3 x UUP, 2 x SDLP, 1 x DUP

1997: 3 x UUP, 2 x SDLP, 1 x DUP

1993-1997 Change: No change

Bann - 6 seats
Party	Candidate	FPv%	Count					
Party	Candidate	FPv%	1	2	3	4	5	6
SDLP	John Dallat*	20.31%	1,234					
UUP	Olive Church*	16.84%	1,023					
UUP	William Watt*	16.29%	990					
SDLP	Eamon Mullan	10.57%	642	990.6				
UUP	William King*	14.07%	855	856.8	963.75			
DUP	Robert Bolton*	10.83%	658	659.2	685.75	708.25	716.05	785.07
DUP	James McCloskey	8.59%	522	524.1	533.7	554	566	613.09
Alliance	Ian McEwan	2.50%	152	157.4	161			
Electorate: 9,982 Valid: 6,076 (60.87%) Spoilt: 112 Quota: 869 Turnout: 6,188 (61.99%)

== 1993 Election ==
1989: 4 x UUP, 2 x SDLP, 1 x DUP

1993: 3 x UUP, 2 x SDLP, 1 x DUP

1989-1993 Change: UUP loss due to the reduction of one seat

Bann - 6 seats
Party	Candidate	FPv%	Count				
Party	Candidate	FPv%	1	2	3	4	5
UUP	William Watt*	16.92%	1,072				
UUP	Olive Church	16.22%	1,028				
UUP	William King*	15.81%	1,002				
SDLP	John Dallat*	15.29%	969				
SDLP	Gerard O'Kane*	13.89%	880	883.4	916.4		
DUP	Robert Bolton	12.34%	782	820.25	836.42	865.82	879.82
UUP	Robert McPherson	6.83%	433	554.89	622.74	707.7	782.1
Alliance	Ian McEwan	2.70%	171	173.21			
Electorate: 9,793 Valid: 6,337 (64.71%) Spoilt: 142 Quota: 906 Turnout: 6,479 (66.16%)

== 1989 Election ==
1985: 4 x UUP, 2 x SDLP, 1 x DUP

1989: 4 x UUP, 2 x SDLP, 1 x DUP

1985-1989 Change: No change

Bann - 7 seats
Party	Candidate	FPv%	Count				
Party	Candidate	FPv%	1	2	3	4	5
UUP	William King*	18.82%	1,326				
UUP	William Watt*	16.82%	1,185				
UUP	Creighton Hutchinson*	16.04%	1,130				
SDLP	John Dallat*	15.50%	1,092				
DUP	Robert Catherwood*	13.56%	955				
UUP	John Moody*	7.50%	528	957.4			
SDLP	Gerard O'Kane*	8.87%	625	626.9	680.9	710.9	909.1
Alliance	Ian McEwan	2.88%	203	215.54	384.54	594.54	601.54
Electorate: 11,366 Valid: 7,044 (61.97%) Spoilt: 201 Quota: 881 Turnout: 7,245 (63.74%)

== 1985 Election ==
1985: 4 x UUP, 2 x SDLP, 1 x DUP

Bann - 7 seats
Party	Candidate	FPv%	Count					
Party	Candidate	FPv%	1	2	3	4	5	6
UUP	William King*	17.14%	1,310					
UUP	Creighton Hutchinson	15.04%	1,150					
SDLP	John Dallat*	14.21%	1,086					
UUP	William Watt	12.06%	922	1,005.7				
SDLP	Gerard O'Kane*	8.84%	676	678.16	678.5	794.42	996.42	
DUP	Robert Catherwood*	9.98%	763	776.77	810.94	811.3	811.3	1,023.3
UUP	John Moody	7.61%	582	761.28	899.49	900.21	900.72	933.72
DUP	Thomas Malone*	7.27%	556	611.62	621.31	621.31	623.58	687.58
DUP	Douglas Darragh	4.23%	323	332.45	337.21	337.81	337.81	
Irish Republican Socialist	Eamon Mullan	3.61%	276	276.81	276.81	284.73		
Electorate: 11,018 Valid: 7,644 (69.38%) Spoilt: 155 Quota: 956 Turnout: 7,799 (70.78%)
