= Coleraine Central (District Electoral Area) =

District electoral areas in Coleraine, Northern Ireland

Coleraine Central DEA (1993-2014) within Coleraine

Coleraine Central was one of the four district electoral areas in Coleraine, Northern Ireland which existed from 1993 to 2014. The district elected six members to Coleraine Borough Council, and formed part of the East Londonderry constituencies for the Northern Ireland Assembly and UK Parliament.

It was created for the 1993 local elections, and contained the wards of Central, Churchland, Knocklynn, Mount Sandel, The Cuts and Waterside. It was abolished for the 2014 local elections and replaced with the Coleraine DEA.

== Councillors ==
| Election | Councillor (Party) | Councillor (Party) | Councillor (Party) | Councillor (Party) | Councillor (Party) | Councillor (Party) |
|---|---|---|---|---|---|---|
| 2011 | Gerry McLaughlin (SDLP) | David McClarty (UUP)/ (Independent) | David Barbour (UUP) | William McCandless (DUP) | George Duddy (DUP) | James McClure (DUP) |
| 2005 | Gerry McLaughlin (SDLP) | David McClarty (UUP)/ (Independent) | David Barbour (UUP) | Elizabeth Johnston (UUP) | Timothy Deans (DUP) | James McClure (DUP) |
| 2001 | Gerry McLaughlin (SDLP) | David McClarty (UUP)/ (Independent) | David Barbour (UUP) | Elizabeth Johnston (UUP) | Timothy Deans (DUP) | James McClure (DUP) |
| 1997 | Gerry McLaughlin (SDLP) | David McClarty (UUP)/ (Independent) | David Barbour (UUP) | Elizabeth Johnston (UUP) | Eamon O'Hara (Alliance) | James McClure (DUP) |
| 1993 | Gerry McLaughlin (SDLP) | David McClarty (UUP)/ (Independent) | Robert White (UUP) | Elizabeth Johnston (UUP) | William Mathews (Alliance) | James McClure (DUP) |

== 2011 Election ==
2005: 3 x UUP, 2 x DUP, 1 x SDLP

2011: 3 x DUP, 1 x UUP, 1 x SDLP, 1 x Independent

2005-2011 Change: DUP gain from UUP, Independent leaves UUP

Coleraine Central - 6 seats
| Party | Candidate | FPv% | Count | | | | | | | |
| Party | Candidate | FPv% | 1 | 2 | 3 | 4 | 5 | 6 | 7 | 8 |
|---|---|---|---|---|---|---|---|---|---|---|
| Independent | David McClarty* | 22.09% | 1,260 | | | | | | | |
| DUP | George Duddy | 12.53% | 715 | 746.16 | 746.16 | 836.16 | | | | |
| SDLP | Gerry McLaughlin* | 7.08% | 404 | 437.06 | 502.82 | 506.96 | 506.96 | 815.38 | | |
| UUP | David Barbour* | 9.76% | 557 | 650.48 | 652.48 | 699.46 | 702.22 | 704.22 | 939.22 | |
| DUP | James McClure* | 10.20% | 582 | 646.98 | 646.98 | 734.3 | 735.68 | 738.68 | 783.21 | 815.03 |
| DUP | William McCandless | 9.20% | 525 | 570.6 | 570.6 | 643.88 | 657.68 | 661.06 | 712.38 | 774.54 |
| Alliance | Graham Scobie | 8.27% | 472 | 545.72 | 551.72 | 560.62 | 560.85 | 586.85 | 621.35 | 649.47 |
| UUP | Nigel MacAuley | 6.19% | 353 | 411.52 | 412.9 | 438.32 | 439.93 | 444.69 | | |
| Sinn Féin | Susan Kelly | 7.15% | 408 | 412.94 | 419.32 | 419.32 | 419.32 | | | |
| Independent | Russell Watton | 5.99% | 342 | 368.98 | 368.98 | | | | | |
| SDLP | Sebastian Pierzchalski | 1.52% | 87 | 89.66 | | | | | | |
Electorate: 11,313 Valid: 5,705 (50.43%) Spoilt: 108 Quota: 816 Turnout: 5,813 (51.38%)

== 2005 Election ==
2001: 3 x UUP, 2 x DUP, 1 x SDLP

2005: 3 x UUP, 2 x DUP, 1 x SDLP

2001-2005 Change: No change

Coleraine Central - 6 seats
| Party | Candidate | FPv% | Count | | | | | | |
| Party | Candidate | FPv% | 1 | 2 | 3 | 4 | 5 | 6 | 7 |
|---|---|---|---|---|---|---|---|---|---|
| UUP | David McClarty* | 23.18% | 1,478 | | | | | | |
| DUP | James McClure* | 16.68% | 1,064 | | | | | | |
| DUP | Timothy Deans* | 14.36% | 916 | | | | | | |
| SDLP | Gerry McLaughlin* | 10.88% | 694 | 716.23 | 719.23 | 722.27 | 1,013.27 | | |
| UUP | Elizabeth Johnston* | 7.39% | 471 | 781.05 | 828.46 | 884.89 | 889.28 | 890.2 | 1,014.2 |
| UUP | David Barbour* | 7.04% | 449 | 608.9 | 649.14 | 697.21 | 702.21 | 704.51 | 850.08 |
| Alliance | Eamon O'Hara | 6.05% | 386 | 415.25 | 422.03 | 425.26 | 442.65 | 538.33 | 555.68 |
| Independent | Russell Watton | 5.96% | 380 | 395.21 | 418.99 | 455.09 | 455.67 | 456.13 | |
| Sinn Féin | Kevin Darragh | 5.74% | 366 | 367.56 | 367.56 | 367.75 | | | |
| DUP | Adrian Parke | 2.71% | 173 | 193.28 | | | | | |
Electorate: 11,309 Valid: 6,377 (56.39%) Spoilt: 101 Quota: 912 Turnout: 6,478 (57.28%)

== 2001 Election ==
1997: 3 x UUP, 1 x DUP, 1 x SDLP, 1 x Alliance

2001: 3 x UUP, 2 x DUP, 1 x SDLP

1997-2001 Change: DUP gain from Alliance

Coleraine Central - 6 seats
| Party | Candidate | FPv% | Count | | |
| Party | Candidate | FPv% | 1 | 2 | 3 |
|---|---|---|---|---|---|
| DUP | James McClure* | 20.39% | 1,426 | | |
| UUP | David McClarty* | 19.95% | 1,395 | | |
| SDLP | Gerry McLaughlin* | 17.62% | 1,232 | | |
| UUP | Elizabeth Johnston* | 14.53% | 1,016 | | |
| DUP | Timothy Deans | 10.00% | 699 | 1,064.12 | |
| UUP | David Barbour* | 10.25% | 717 | 761.8 | 1,103.56 |
| Alliance | Eamon O'Hara* | 7.26% | 508 | 515.36 | 564.32 |
Electorate: 11,571 Valid: 6,993 (60.44%) Spoilt: 137 Quota: 1,000 Turnout: 7,130 (61.62%)

== 1997 Election ==
1993: 3 x UUP, 1 x DUP, 1 x SDLP, 1 x Alliance

1997: 3 x UUP, 1 x DUP, 1 x SDLP, 1 x Alliance

1993-1997 Change: No change

Coleraine Central - 6 seats
| Party | Candidate | FPv% | Count | | | | | | | |
| Party | Candidate | FPv% | 1 | 2 | 3 | 4 | 5 | 6 | 7 | 8 |
|---|---|---|---|---|---|---|---|---|---|---|
| UUP | David McClarty* | 24.94% | 1,255 | | | | | | | |
| DUP | James McClure* | 18.70% | 941 | | | | | | | |
| SDLP | Gerry McLaughlin* | 14.49% | 729 | | | | | | | |
| UUP | David Barbour | 10.51% | 529 | 702.8 | 714.8 | 724.8 | | | | |
| UUP | Elizabeth Johnston* | 8.70% | 438 | 627.64 | 644.68 | 668.92 | 871.92 | | | |
| Alliance | Eamon O'Hara | 5.96% | 300 | 327.72 | 328.2 | 542.36 | 591.44 | 631.44 | 640.48 | 644.32 |
| DUP | Marie McAllister* | 5.50% | 277 | 324.96 | 498.24 | 502.92 | 555.72 | 639.72 | 640 | 641.92 |
| UUP | Daniel Christie | 5.78% | 291 | 367.56 | 378.36 | 389.24 | | | | |
| Alliance | Yvonne Boyle | 4.25% | 214 | 226.76 | 227.48 | | | | | |
| NI Women's Coalition | Avril Watson | 1.15% | 58 | 63.76 | 64.68 | | | | | |
Electorate: 10,971 Valid: 5,032 (45.87%) Spoilt: 75 Quota: 719 Turnout: 5,107 (46.55%)

== 1993 Election ==
1993: 3 x UUP, 1 x DUP, 1 x SDLP, 1 x Alliance

Coleraine Central - 6 seats
| Party | Candidate | FPv% | Count | | | | | | | | |
| Party | Candidate | FPv% | 1 | 2 | 3 | 4 | 5 | 6 | 7 | 8 | 9 |
|---|---|---|---|---|---|---|---|---|---|---|---|
| DUP | James McClure* | 23.21% | 1,206 | | | | | | | | |
| UUP | Robert White* | 15.15% | 787 | | | | | | | | |
| SDLP | Gerry McLaughlin | 12.07% | 627 | 629.4 | 630.4 | 774.4 | | | | | |
| UUP | David McClarty* | 10.47% | 544 | 608 | 614 | 631.4 | 640.9 | 742.6 | 745.08 | | |
| UUP | Elizabeth Johnston | 7.45% | 387 | 432.2 | 434.2 | 443.6 | 448.8 | 600.15 | 600.15 | 824.15 | |
| Alliance | William Mathews* | 7.10% | 369 | 377 | 473 | 544.4 | 546.85 | 565.15 | 592.43 | 629.68 | 652.08 |
| DUP | Donald Clifton | 3.66% | 190 | 443.2 | 443.2 | 449 | 449.8 | 482.45 | 483.07 | 565.22 | 623.32 |
| UUP | John Moody | 6.47% | 336 | 383.6 | 385 | 395.4 | 410.35 | 451.9 | 452.21 | | |
| UUP | Daniel Christie | 6.33% | 329 | 360.6 | 361.6 | 365 | 370.35 | | | | |
| Independent | Patrick McFeely* | 5.79% | 301 | 308.6 | 314.6 | | | | | | |
| Alliance | Lara McIlroy | 2.29% | 119 | 119.8 | | | | | | | |
Electorate: 10,293 Valid: 5,195 (50.47%) Spoilt: 83 Quota: 743 Turnout: 5,278 (51.28%)
