= Coleraine East (District Electoral Area) =

District electoral areas in Coleraine, Northern Ireland

Coleraine East DEA (1993-2014) within Coleraine

Coleraine East was one of the four district electoral areas in Coleraine, Northern Ireland, which existed from 1993 to 2014. This district elected five members to Coleraine Borough Council, and formed part of the East Londonderry constituencies for both the Northern Ireland Assembly and UK Parliament.

It was established for the 1993 local elections, and comprised the wards of Ballysally, Cross Glebe, Dundoonan, Dunluce, and University. It was abolished for the 2014 local elections and replaced by the Coleraine DEA.

== Councillors ==
Election	Councillor (Party)	Councillor (Party)	Councillor (Party)	Councillor (Party)	Councillor (Party)
2011	Yvonne Boyle (Alliance)	David Harding (UUP)	Phyllis Fielding (DUP)	William Creelman (DUP)	Maurice Bradley (DUP)
2005	Robert McPherson (UUP)	Elizabeth Black (UUP)	Phyllis Fielding (DUP)	William Creelman (DUP)	Maurice Bradley (DUP)
2001	Robert McPherson (UUP)	Elizabeth Black (UUP)	Phyllis Fielding (DUP)	William Creelman (DUP)	Maurice Bradley (DUP)
1997	Robert McPherson (UUP)	Elizabeth Black (UUP)	William Mathews (Alliance)	William Creelman (DUP)	Maurice Bradley (DUP)
1993	David Gilmour (UUP)	Elizabeth Black (UUP)	William Glenn (UUP)	William Creelman (DUP)	Marie McAllister (DUP)

== 2011 Election ==
2005: 3 x DUP, 2 x UUP

2011: 3 x DUP, 1 x UUP, 1 x Alliance

2005-2011 Change: Alliance gain from UUP

Coleraine East - 6 seats
Party	Candidate	FPv%	Count				
Party	Candidate	FPv%	1	2	3	4	5
DUP	Maurice Bradley*	44.01%	1,507				
DUP	William Creelman*	10.98%	376	1,120.25			
DUP	Phyllis Fielding*	4.88%	167	251.5	768.46		
UUP	David Harding	15.10%	517	568.35	579.39		
Alliance	Yvonne Boyle	10.22%	350	261.7	362.66	370.86	539.06
UUP	Robert McPherson*	8.03%	275	308.8	318.88	505.43	518.9
SDLP	Teresa Young	6.78%	232	241.1	243.02	245.48	
Electorate: 7,678 Valid: 3,424 (44.59%) Spoilt: 95 Quota: 571 Turnout: 3,519 (45.83%)

== 2005 Election ==
2001: 3 x DUP, 2 x UUP

2005: 3 x DUP, 2 x UUP

2001-2005 Change: No change

Coleraine East - 6 seats
Party	Candidate	FPv%	Count						
Party	Candidate	FPv%	1	2	3	4	5	6	7
DUP	Maurice Bradley*	34.99%	1,395						
DUP	William Creelman*	15.78%	629	1,217.3					
DUP	Phyllis Fielding*	6.70%	267	338.55	862.05				
UUP	Elizabeth Black*	10.46%	417	437.14	443.14	506.04	507.04	560.02	623.29
UUP	Robert McPherson*	10.43%	416	441.44	451.44	494.73	495.73	523.1	573
UUP	David Harding	8.28%	330	342.19	350.69	431.72	432.72	464.83	507.26
SDLP	John Montgomery	5.69%	227	229.12	229.12	232.82	333.82	396.72	
Alliance	Yvonne Boyle	4.64%	185	186.06	188.06	193.24	199.24		
Sinn Féin	Maria O'Neill	3.03%	121	121	121.5	121.5			
Electorate: 7,735 Valid: 3,987 (51.54%) Spoilt: 89 Quota: 65 Turnout: 4,076 (52.70%)

== 2001 Election ==
1997: 2 x DUP, 2 x UUP, 1 x Alliance

2001: 3 x DUP, 2 x UUP

1997-2001 Change: DUP gain from Alliance

Coleraine East - 6 seats
Party	Candidate	FPv%	Count								
Party	Candidate	FPv%	1	2	3	4	5	6	7	8	9
DUP	Maurice Bradley*	29.22%	1,389								
UUP	Elizabeth Black*	17.00%	808								
DUP	William Creelman*	12.54%	596	1,025.57							
UUP	Robert McPherson*	9.68%	460	481.93	486.97	514.98	564.25	593.13	647.14	827.14	
DUP	Phyllis Fielding	2.48%	118	164.87	377.51	400.05	436.69	530.48	543.91	601.56	625.94
SDLP	John Montgomery	7.74%	368	368	368.48	370.91	377.91	379.77	507.63	569.3	578.84
Independent	Thomas Houston	6.71%	319	330.18	332.82	340.68	362.11	375.55	436.98		
Alliance	Patrick McGowan	5.76%	274	277.87	278.11	290.11	298.02	304.45			
Independent	Alistair Crawford	3.13%	149	188.13	191.25	221.07	238.32				
PUP	David Gilmour	3.07%	146	161.91	166.71	188.34					
Independent	Robert Hunter	2.65%	126	143.2	145.6						
Electorate: 8,415 Valid: 4,753 (56.48%) Spoilt: 109 Quota: 793 Turnout: 4,862 (57.78%)

== 1997 Election ==
1993: 3 x UUP, 2 x DUP

1997: 2 x UUP, 2 x DUP, 1 x Alliance

1993-1997 Change: Alliance gain from UUP

Coleraine East - 6 seats
Party	Candidate	FPv%	Count						
Party	Candidate	FPv%	1	2	3	4	5	6	7
DUP	Maurice Bradley	24.21%	833						
UUP	Elizabeth Black*	17.61%	606						
DUP	William Creelman*	13.48%	464	658.06					
UUP	Robert McPherson	10.32%	355	366.16	389.74	413.1	513.38	554.12	572.32
Alliance	William Mathews*	12.00%	413	416.72	419.42	456.42	462.42	497.02	499.47
Ind. Unionist	David Gilmour*	8.22%	283	303.77	329.87	360.59	391.64	474.71	480.81
Ind. Unionist	Martin Hunter	5.84%	201	214.33	229.81	234.99	259.69		
UUP	Gary Wolfe	4.68%	161	168.44	179.06	191.37			
Independent	Trevor Cooke	3.63%	125	126.55	128.17				
Electorate: 8,639 Valid: 3,441 (39.83%) Spoilt: 69 Quota: 574 Turnout: 3,510 (40.63%)

== 1993 Election ==
1993: 3 x UUP, 2 x DUP

Coleraine East - 6 seats
Party	Candidate	FPv%	Count				
Party	Candidate	FPv%	1	2	3	4	5
UUP	Elizabeth Black*	22.85%	825				
DUP	William Creelman*	21.16%	764				
UUP	William Glenn	12.05%	435	528.8	541.34	555.86	589.38
UUP	David Gilmour	12.07%	436	511.6	523.92	543.06	584.96
DUP	Marie McAllister*	8.53%	308	321.16	450.52	463.52	491.64
UUP	William Johnston	10.88%	393	412.04	416.88	425.56	465.46
Alliance	Hilary McCartney	6.95%	251	258	258.66	388.28	
Alliance	Amyan MacFayden	3.27%	118	119.96	120.18		
Independent	Trevor Cooke	2.24%	81	90.52	91.84		
Electorate: 8,017 Valid: 3,611 (45.04%) Spoilt: 125 Quota: 602 Turnout: 3,736 (46.60%)
