= Adrian McQuillan =

British politician (born 1965)

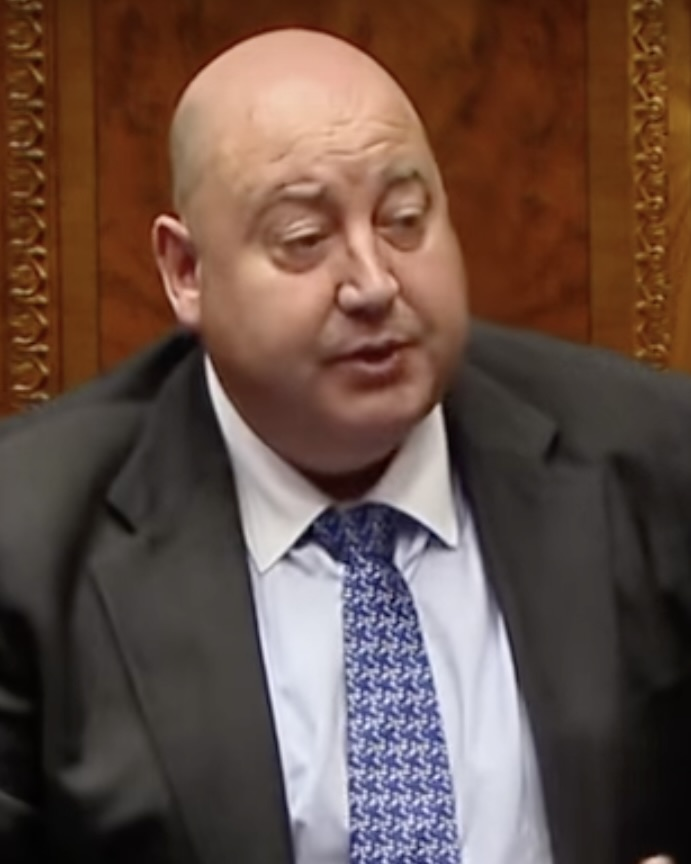
- McQuillan in 2015

Member of Causeway Coast and Glens Borough Council
- In office 2 May 2019 – 18 May 2023
- Preceded by: Sam Cole
- Succeeded by: Dawn Huggins
- Constituency: Bann

Member of the Northern Ireland Assembly for East Londonderry
- In office 7 March 2007 – 2 March 2017
- Preceded by: Norman Hillis
- Succeeded by: Seat abolished

Member of Coleraine Borough Council
- In office 7 June 2001 – December 2013
- Preceded by: Robert Bolton
- Succeeded by: Michelle Knight-McQuillan
- Constituency: Bann

Personal details
- Born: 8 June 1965 (age 61) Ballymoney, Northern Ireland
- Party: Independent Unionist (since 2023); Democratic Unionist Party (until 2023)

Adrian McQuillan (born 8 June 1965, Ballymoney) is a former Northern Irish unionist politician who was a Causeway Coast and Glens Councillor for the Bann DEA from 2019 to 2023.

He previously served as a Democratic Unionist Party (DUP) Member of the Northern Ireland Assembly (MLA) for East Londonderry from 2007 to 2017

== Career ==
McQuillan is a joiner by training, and was a postman for 18 years.

McQuillan was first elected onto Coleraine Borough Council at the 2001 election, representing the Bann District. He was the only Democratic Unionist Party (DUP) councillor to be returned in that district, following Robert Bolton's unsuccessful candidacy as an independent. McQuillan was re-elected to the council in 2005.

At the 2007 Northern Ireland Assembly election, McQuillan stood as the third DUP candidate in East Londonderry. He won a seat at the expense of the Ulster Unionist Party's Norman Hillis, by a margin of 879 votes on the final count.

McQuillan was eliminated on the eighth count at the 2017 Assembly election. He was one of several MLAs to lose their seat in that election, due to a reduction in Assembly seats from 6 to 5 per constituency.

He was elected to Causeway Coast and Glens Borough Council for the Bann District in the 2019 Northern Ireland local elections. In January 2023, after falling out with the DUP leadership over bullying allegations, he resigned from the party to sit as an independent. He stood for re-election in the local elections that same year, but was unsuccessful.

== Personal life ==
He is a member of Moneydig Presbyterian Church.

Northern Ireland Assembly
Preceded by Norman Hillis	MLA for Londonderry, East; 2007–2017	Seat abolished
