= Maurice Bradley =

Politician from Northern Ireland

Maurice Bradley MLA
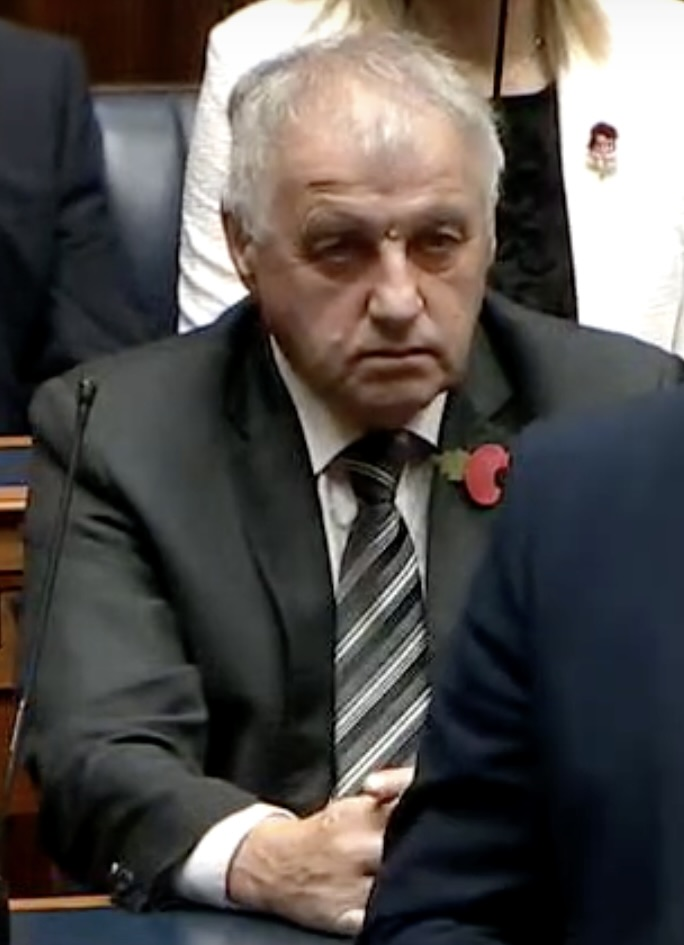
- Bradley in 2022

Member of the Legislative Assembly for East Londonderry
- Incumbent
- Assumed office May 2016
- Preceded by: Gregory Campbell

Member of Coleraine Borough Council
- In office 1994 – 22 May 2014
- Preceded by: Marie McAllister
- Succeeded by: Council abolished
- Constituency: Coleraine East

Personal details
- Born: John Maurice Bradley; 5 April 1954 (age 72) Coleraine, Northern Ireland
- Party: Democratic Unionist Party

Maurice Bradley (born 5 April 1954) is a Democratic Unionist Party (DUP) politician, serving as a Member of the Northern Ireland Assembly (MLA) for East Londonderry since 2016. Bradley is the DUP's policing spokesperson. He was previously a Coleraine Councillor for the Coleraine East DEA from 1994 to 2014.

== Career ==
Bradley was first elected to Coleraine Borough Council in a 1994 by-election, representing the Coleraine East District, and was subsequently re-elected in 2001.

At the 2003 Northern Ireland Assembly election, he was one of three DUP candidates standing in East Londonderry, though Bradley himself was not elected.

He was re-elected as a Councillor in the 2005 local elections. Bradley served twice as mayor of Coleraine, firstly between 2007-2008 and later between 2011 and 2012.

Bradley stood for the Northern Ireland Assembly in the 2016 election, after Gregory Campbell stood down and was elected, in the first count, topping the poll.

Bradley was criticised in 2018 for sharing a post that described London mayor Sadiq Khan as "the enemy within" and defending a far-right march in Poland.

Northern Ireland Assembly
Preceded by Gregory Campbell	MLA for Londonderry, East; 2016–present	Incumbent
