= Gregory Campbell (politician) =

Northern Irish politician (born 1953)

Gregory Campbell CBE MP
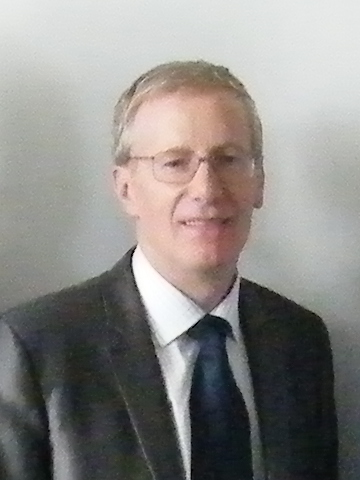
- Campbell in 2011

Member of Parliament for East Londonderry
- Incumbent
- Assumed office 7 June 2001
- Preceded by: William Ross
- Majority: 179 (0.5%)

Minister of Culture, Arts and Leisure
- In office 9 June 2008 – 1 July 2009
- Preceded by: Edwin Poots
- Succeeded by: Nelson McCausland

Member of the Legislative Assembly for East Londonderry
- In office 25 June 1998 – 7 May 2016
- Preceded by: Constituency created
- Succeeded by: Maurice Bradley

Member of Derry City Council
- In office 15 May 1985 – 5 May 2011
- Preceded by: New district
- Succeeded by: April Garfield-Kidd
- Constituency: Waterside
- In office 20 May 1981 – 15 May 1985
- Preceded by: Herbert Faulkner
- Succeeded by: District abolished
- Constituency: Londonderry Area B

Northern Ireland Forum Member
- In office 30 May 1996 – 25 April 1998
- Preceded by: Forum created
- Succeeded by: Forum dissolved
- Constituency: Top-up list

Member of the Legislative Assembly for Londonderry
- In office 20 October 1982 – 1986
- Preceded by: Assembly reconvened
- Succeeded by: Assembly abolished

Personal details
- Born: Gregory Lloyd Campbell; 15 February 1953 (age 73) Waterside, Derry, Northern Ireland
- Party: Democratic Unionist Party
- Spouse: Frances Campbell
- Children: 4
- Education: University of Ulster

Gregory Lloyd Campbell CBE (born 15 February 1953) is a British Democratic Unionist Party (DUP) politician who has been the Member of Parliament (MP) for East Londonderry since 2001. As of 2024, Campbell is Northern Ireland's longest-serving current MP. He is the DUP Spokesperson for International Development.

He was returned to serve at the 2024 United Kingdom general election in Northern Ireland with a majority of only 179 votes and a swing of 12.2% against him.

He was previously a Member of the Northern Ireland Assembly (MLA) for East Londonderry from 1998 to 2016.

== Early life ==
Campbell was born and raised in the Waterside area of Derry as an only child. He was educated at the city's technical college and at the University of Ulster.

== Political career ==
He joined the DUP in the 1970s and was first elected to Londonderry City Council in 1981. Campbell briefly led the local DUP members out of the council in 1984 when it changed its name to Derry City Council, although he returned to his seat not long after. He stood down in 2011 after 30 years as a councillor.

He was chosen to contest the Foyle constituency in the general election of 1983. He contested the same seat again in the general elections of 1987 and 1992, although each time he finished second behind Social Democratic and Labour Party leader John Hume.

He appeared in the BBC Real Lives documentary At the Edge of the Union, which was temporarily blocked in August 1985 by direct government intervention from the then Home Secretary, Leon Brittan. This led to a one-day strike by the National Union of Journalists to defend the independence of the BBC.

That same year, in an extensive interview with Magill magazine, Campbell outlined his opposition to homosexuality, telling journalist Fintan O'Toole: "It's an evil, wicked, abhorrent practice. My opposition to that is based on the Bible and also based on natural justice and I know many people who do not share my Protestant faith but who would share my opposition to homosexuality because they believe it is something which would corrupt society as a whole and is something so radically awful as to merit total and utter opposition. You're not even talking about something which is a run of the mill sexual practice but something which is totally and utterly depraved, and to me anyway the AIDS scare which is currently running through America is proof that homosexual practice is something which calls upon the curse of God."

Given that Foyle had a predominantly nationalist electorate, the increasingly high-profile Campbell was transferred to the more winnable East Londonderry seat, where he ran unsuccessfully in 1997. Campbell won the seat at his second attempt in the 2001 general election, gaining a majority of 1,901 over sitting MP William Ross of the Ulster Unionist Party. He was re-elected in the 2005 general election, this time securing an increased majority of 7,498 over the new UUP candidate David McClarty. Until 2016, he was also a member of the Northern Ireland Assembly, topping the East Londonderry poll (from which six members are elected) in the elections of 1998, 2003, 2007 and 2011.

=== Government and subsequent activity ===
Campbell was appointed Minister of Regional Development in the Northern Ireland Executive in July 2000. On 9 June 2008, Campbell took over the Department of Culture, Arts and Leisure, replacing Edwin Poots, following a reshuffle of the DUP's ministerial team by newly appointed First Minister Peter Robinson. He was replaced in this role by party colleague Nelson McCausland following another reshuffle on 22 June 2009 and the announcement by Peter Robinson that DUP politicians would no longer hold office in the Assembly and serve as MPs at Westminster simultaneously.

In October 2008, Campbell spoke out against the American cartoon The Simpsons, after the Sex, Pies and Idiot Scrapes episode showed a fight between nationalists and unionists. The episode also featured references to the IRA. Campbell said, "The Simpsons is a humorous cartoon but the context of using a line like that about an organisation which caused so much death will lead people to have very mixed views."

In December 2008, Campbell criticised the singer Dido for her song "Let's Do the Things We Normally Do", which referenced lyrics from a song, "The Men Behind the Wire". The original song had been written in response to internment in Northern Ireland and Campbell suggested that Dido "should clarify her position so that her fans and the wider public knows where she stands on these things".

In 2009, Campbell declared his support for capital punishment in "some cases" during a Westminster Parliament debate.

In 2011, a man was convicted and was given a suspended jail sentence and fined after posting a menacing message on Facebook about Campbell. In February 2012, Campbell voiced opposition to the redrawing of the electoral borders in Northern Ireland, stating that they "will have a detrimental effect on the north west." Campbell supports a number of evangelical Protestant groups including a creationist lobby group, the Caleb Foundation.

He has been critical of some Twitter comments by Derry-born footballer James McClean and condemned McClean's decision not to wear a poppy on his shirt in the buildup to Remembrance Sunday in 2012. McClean, who played for Sunderland at the time, had stated on Twitter that his favourite song was "The Broad Black Brimmer" by the republican folk group The Wolfe Tones. Campbell commented, "I've been watching him closely and knew he would slip up sooner or later." Subsequently, McClean was banned from using Twitter from his club. Campbell was offered an invitation to a Wolfe Tones concert, which he declined.

In March 2013, Campbell made a successful parliamentary motion to stop a one-off concept car made by the motor company Kia from ever going into production. The show car was unveiled at the Geneva Motor Show and was named "Provo" after the Italian word Prova, meaning trial or test. He put forward a motion at the House of Commons to stop any possible development of the car, due to the connotations the name might have in Ireland ("Provos" is a common shortened form of Provisional IRA), although the car was never intended to go into production. A spokesperson for Kia said in a statement it would be certain not to market any future car as a "Provo" in the United Kingdom or the Republic of Ireland, adding: "This car is a showcase, it's a little bit of frivolity, it's for a motor show in Switzerland designed by an Italian at a design studio in Frankfurt."

In November 2014, Campbell became embroiled in a controversy after parodying the Irish language while addressing the Northern Ireland Assembly. Mocking the nationalist MLAs' tradition of beginning addressing the Assembly with the Gaelic words "go raibh maith agat, Ceann Comhairle" ("thank you, Speaker"), he opened a question about minority language policy saying "curry my yoghurt, can coca coalyer", corrupting the Gaelic phrase by speaking it in his native Northern Irish Accent. Campbell was unwilling to apologise, and was temporarily censured. He said at the DUP's annual conference later that month: "On behalf of our party let me say clearly, and slowly so that Caitríona Ruane and Gerry Adams understand, we will never agree to an Irish Language Act at Stormont and we will treat their entire wish list as no more than toilet paper". The Identity and Language (Northern Ireland) Act 2022 was subsequently passed by the parliament of the United Kingdom, providing official recognition of the status of the Irish language in Northern Ireland.

In March 2019, Campbell was one of 21 MPs who voted against LGBT inclusive sex and relationship education in English schools.

In February 2021, Campbell was urged by anti-racism organisations to apologise after describing, on Facebook, an edition of Songs of Praise that featured only black people as the "BBC at its BLM worst". Campbell wrote: "There were five singers, all of them black. There were three judges all of them black and one presenter who was incidentally, yes black. The singers were all very good but can you imagine an all white line up with an all white jury and presented by a white person? No I can't either."

Campbell was one of three DUP MPs on a list of MPs, military figures, and staff from most major British newspapers and broadcasters, who were banned by the Russian authorities in June 2022, as a response to international sanctions imposed on Russia because of its invasion of Ukraine and the “spreading of false information about Russia”, as well as “anti-Russian actions of the British government”.

In March 2024, he was made a Commander of the Order of the British Empire (CBE) for parliamentary and public service.

Campbell's majority had decreased by 23.9% at the 2024 general election, leaving him just 179 (0.5%) votes ahead of Sinn Féin's Kathleen McGurk.

Northern Ireland Assembly (1982)
New assembly	MPA for Londonderry; 1982–1986	Assembly abolished
Northern Ireland Forum
New forum	Regional Member; 1996–1998	Forum dissolved
Northern Ireland Assembly
New assembly	MLA for Londonderry, East; 1998–2016	Succeeded by Maurice Bradley
Parliament of the United Kingdom
Preceded by William Ross	Member of Parliament for East Londonderry; 2001–present	Incumbent
Political offices
Preceded by Peter Robinson	Minister for Regional Development; 2001	Succeeded by Peter Robinson
Preceded by Edwin Poots	Minister of Culture, Arts and Leisure; 2008–2009	Succeeded by Nelson McCausland
