= Robert Bolton (politician) =

Politician in Northern Ireland

Member of Coleraine Borough Council
- In office 19 May 1993 – 7 June 2001
- Preceded by: Robert Catherwood
- Succeeded by: Adrian McQuillan
- Constituency: Bann
- In office 15 May 1985 – 17 May 1989
- Preceded by: District created
- Succeeded by: David McClarty
- Constituency: Coleraine Town
- In office 20 May 1981 – 15 May 1985
- Preceded by: Matthew Adams
- Succeeded by: District abolished
- Constituency: Coleraine Area C

Member of the Northern Ireland Forum for East Londonderry
- In office 30 May 1996 – 25 April 1998

Personal details
- Born: Coleraine, Northern Ireland
- Party: Independent Unionist (from 2001)
- Other political affiliations: DUP (until 2001)

Robert Bolton was a Northern Irish unionist politician.

== Political career ==
He was a Democratic Unionist Party member of Coleraine Borough Council from 1981 to 1989, and 1993 to 2001. He stood unsuccessfully as an independent candidate at the 2001 election to the council.

He was elected to the Northern Ireland Forum in 1996

Northern Ireland Forum
New forum	Member for East Londonderry; 1996–1998	Forum dissolved
