= Norman Hillis =

Ulster Unionist politician

Member of Causeway Coast and Glens Borough Council
- In office 22 May 2014 – 18 May 2023
- Preceded by: Council created
- Succeeded by: Allister Kyle
- Constituency: Causeway

Member of Coleraine Borough Council
- In office 19 May 1993 – 22 May 2014
- Preceded by: William Glenn
- Succeeded by: Council abolished
- Constituency: The Skerries

Member of the Northern Ireland Assembly for East Londonderry
- In office 26 November 2003 – 7 March 2007
- Preceded by: Boyd Douglas
- Succeeded by: Adrian McQuillan

Personal details
- Born: January 1947 (age 79) County Londonderry, Northern Ireland
- Party: Ulster Unionist Party
- Website: http://www.normanhillis.com

Norman Frederick Hillis (born January 1947) was an Ulster Unionist Party (UUP) politician and businessman who was a Causeway Coast and Glens Councillor for the Causeway DEA from 2014 to 2023, and a Member of the Northern Ireland Assembly (MLA) for East Londonderry from 2003 to 2007.

== Career ==
Hillis was educated at Coleraine Academical Institution and the former Coleraine Technical College and has been active in the business community of Portrush where he has been president of the resort's Chamber of Commerce and Coleraine Lions Club. From 2014 to 2023, he was a UUP councillor on Causeway Coast and Glens Borough Council (Formerly Coleraine Borough Council), having first been elected in 1993, and was Mayor of Coleraine from 1999 to 2000, and from 2010 to 2011.

In 2003, Hillis was elected as a member for the Northern Ireland Assembly constituency of East Londonderry, but lost his seat in the 2007 election. He is UUP Representative on the Confederation of European Councillors and spokesperson for the party on matters relating to north–south and East/West issues.

Hillis is a Member of Coleraine's District Policing Partnership (DPP) and is a Justice of the Peace. He is a former Chairman of the Coleraine branch of the Ulster Young Unionist Council.

Civic offices
Preceded by James McClure	Mayor of Coleraine; 1999–2000	Succeeded by Liz Johnston
Northern Ireland Assembly
Preceded by Boyd Douglas	MLA for Londonderry, East; 2003–2007	Succeeded by Adrian McQuillan
