= John Dallat =

Northern Irish politician (1947–2020)

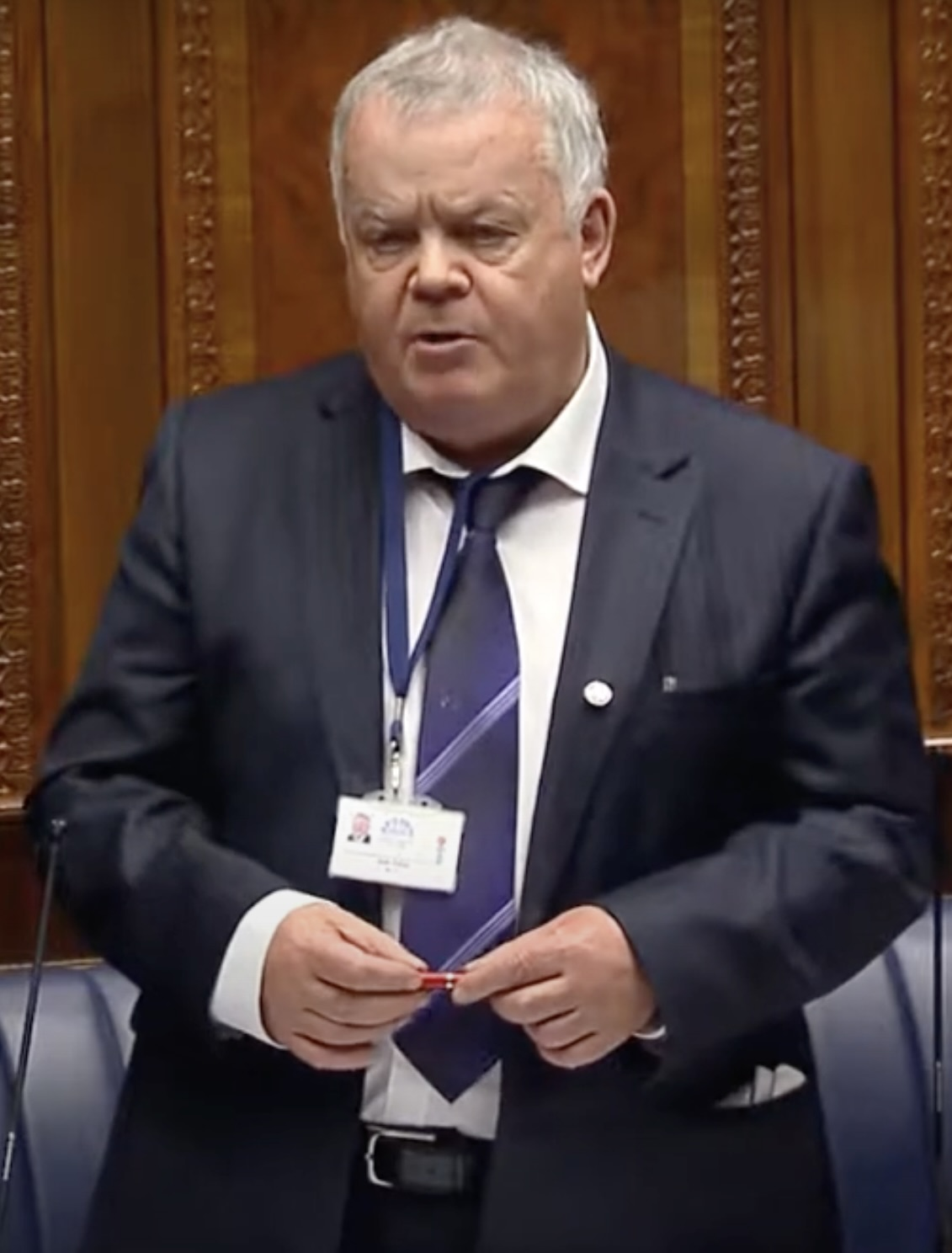
- Dallat in 2015

Deputy Speaker of the Northern Ireland Assembly
- In office 8 May 2007 – 12 May 2016
- Preceded by: Donovan McClelland (2003)
- Succeeded by: Patsy McGlone

Member of the Northern Ireland Assembly for Londonderry East
- In office 2 March 2017 – 5 May 2020
- Preceded by: Gerry Mullan
- Succeeded by: Cara Hunter
- In office 25 June 1998 – 30 March 2016
- Preceded by: New Creation
- Succeeded by: Gerry Mullan

Member of Coleraine Borough Council
- In office 15 May 1985 – 5 May 2011
- Preceded by: New district
- Succeeded by: Rósín Loftus
- Constituency: Bann
- In office 18 May 1977 – 15 May 1985
- Preceded by: Patrick Cassidy
- Succeeded by: District abolished
- Constituency: Coleraine Area A

Personal details
- Born: 24 March 1947 Rasharkin, Northern Ireland
- Died: 5 May 2020 (aged 73)
- Party: SDLP
- Spouse: Anne Dallat
- Children: 3
- Education: University College Galway; University of Ulster

John Dallat (24 March 1947 – 5 May 2020) was an Irish politician in the Social Democratic and Labour Party (SDLP) who represented East Londonderry in the Northern Ireland Assembly from 1998 to 2016, and then from 2017 until his death in 2020.

== Education ==
He attended Coleraine College of Further Education, the North West College of Further and Higher Education, the University of Ulster and University College, Galway before becoming a business studies instructor.

== Career ==
Dallat joined the Social Democratic and Labour Party and was elected to Coleraine Borough Council in 1977. From 2001 to 2002, he was the first Irish nationalist Mayor of Coleraine.

In 1996 he was an unsuccessful candidate in the Northern Ireland Forum election in East Londonderry. Dallat was elected to the Northern Ireland Assembly for East Londonderry in 1998 and held his seat in 2003. At the 2001 and 2005 UK general elections, he unsuccessfully contested the Westminster seat of East Londonderry.

He had been vocal in his opposition of the Coleraine loyalist who was convicted of the Greysteel massacre, Torrens Knight, being released from prison. Knight who was freed under the terms of the Good Friday agreement.

On 14 September 2010, he shared a debate with the NF publicity officer, Tom Linden, on BBC Radio Foyle about the support for the NF in Coleraine. Dallat expressed his disgust and was then criticised by Linden for being a member of a sectarian party, which allowed Dallat to air his views, which resulted in the NF Coleraine organiser, Mark Brown, "thanking" Dallat for helping the NF double its support in Coleraine through enquiries and membership.

A member of the Society of Saint Vincent de Paul, Dallat commented that Conor Murphy had scheduled the 2016 opening of the Dungiven by-pass to coincide with the centenary of the Easter Rising, to which Sinn Féin councillor Paddy Butcher said: "Attacking Sinn Féin minister Conor Murphy, Mr. Dallat cautioned the residents of Dungiven to 'hope the Dungiven bypass is less of an aspiration and more something they (Sinn Féin) are actually capable of delivering'".

After a short retirement, Dallat retained the SDLP seat in East Londonderry in the 2017 Assembly elections.

== Death ==
Dallat died on 5 May 2020 at the age of 73.

Civic offices
Preceded by Liz Johnston	Mayor of Coleraine; 2001–2002	Succeeded by Olive Church
Northern Ireland Assembly
New assembly	MLA for East Londonderry; 1998–2016	Succeeded by Gerry Mullan
Preceded by Gerry Mullan	MLA for East Londonderry; 2017–2020	Succeeded by Cara Hunter
Preceded by Donovan McClelland; Jane Morrice; Jim Wilson	Deputy Speaker; 2007–2016; With: Francie Molloy 2007–2011; David McClarty 2007–2011; Roy Beggs Jr 2007–2016	Succeeded by Danny Kennedy; Patsy McGlone
