= Pauline Armitage =

British politician

Mayor of Coleraine
- In office 1995–1997
- Preceded by: David McClarty
- Succeeded by: James McClure

Member of Coleraine Borough Council
- In office 15 May 1985 – 5 May 2005
- Preceded by: District created
- Succeeded by: Sandy Gilkinson
- Constituency: The Skerries

Member of the Northern Ireland Assembly for East Londonderry
- In office 25 June 1998 – 26 November 2003
- Preceded by: New Creation
- Succeeded by: George Robinson

Personal details
- Born: Coleraine, Northern Ireland
- Party: Ulster Unionist Party (1969-2003)
- Other political affiliations: UK Unionist Party (2003-2005)

Pauline Armitage is a former Northern Irish unionist politician who was a Member of the Northern Ireland Assembly (MLA) for East Londonderry from 1998 to 2003.

== Background ==
Based in Coleraine, Armitage joined the Young Unionists in 1969. She served in the Ulster Defence Regiment before being elected to Coleraine Borough Council for the Ulster Unionist Party (UUP) in 1985. She served as the Mayor of Coleraine from 1995 to 1997.

In 1996 she was an unsuccessful candidate in the Northern Ireland Forum election in East Londonderry. In 1998, Armitage was elected to the Northern Ireland Assembly, representing East Londonderry. In this session of the Assembly, she occasionally voted against the party line, supporting a Democratic Unionist Party motion for Sinn Féin MLAs to be excluded from the Executive. In November 2001, she was suspended from the UUP, at the same time that Peter Weir was expelled from the party, after the two voted against party leader David Trimble's re-appointment as First Minister.

Armitage sat as an independent Unionist for the remainder of the session. In June 2003, she resigned her membership of the UUP, quickly joining the UK Unionist Party (UKUP). She stood unsuccessfully for the UKUP in East Londonderry at the 2003 Assembly election, taking only 906 votes.

Civic offices
Preceded by David McClarty	Mayor of Coleraine; 1995–1997	Succeeded by James McClure
Northern Ireland Assembly
New assembly	MLA for Londonderry, East; 1998–2003	Succeeded by George Robinson
