= Desmond Stewart =

Northern Irish unionist politician

Member of Coleraine Borough Council
- In office 17 May 1989 – 17 November 2006
- Preceded by: Matthew Kane
- Succeeded by: Barney Fitzpatrick
- Constituency: The Skerries

Member of the Northern Ireland Forum for East Londonderry
- In office 30 May 1996 – 25 April 1998

Personal details
- Born: 1949 (age 75–76); Portrush, Northern Ireland
- Political party: DUP (before 2006; 2025 - present)

Robert Desmond Stewart (born 1949), known as Dessie Stewart, is a former Northern Irish unionist politician.

== Political career ==
Living in Portrush, Stewart joined the Democratic Unionist Party (DUP), and first stood for Coleraine Borough Council for the party in the Skerries ward, at the 1985 Northern Ireland local elections. Although he was unsuccessful, he was narrowly elected at the following election, in 1989, and then topped the poll in 1993. At the Northern Ireland Forum election in 1996, he stood in East Londonderry, and was elected from second place on the DUP list.

Stewart held his council seat in the 1997 and 2001 local elections. In 2001/2, he served as Deputy Mayor of Coleraine, then in 2003/4 as the borough's Mayor.

Following the 2005 Northern Ireland local elections, in which Stewart was again re-elected, he was accused of electoral fraud. He was subsequently convicted of taking fifteen electoral votes from a care home and using them to vote for himself. He admitted the charges and resigned from both his party and the council, and was sentenced to four months in prison. During his trial, he punched a press photographer, for which he was fined £300. The subsequent council by-election was won by the Alliance Party, which has held the seat ever since.

Civic offices
Preceded by Olive Church	Mayor of Coleraine; 2003–2004	Succeeded by Robert McPhearson
