= James McClure (Unionist politician) =

Northern Irish politician (1926–2014)

Chairman of the Democratic Unionist Party
- In office 1981–2000
- Preceded by: William Beattie
- Succeeded by: Maurice Morrow

Mayor of Coleraine
- In office 1997–1999
- Preceded by: Pauline Armitage
- Succeeded by: Norman Hillis
- In office 1983–1984
- Preceded by: G.A. Mcllrath
- Succeeded by: William King

Member of Coleraine Borough Council
- In office 19 May 1993 – 22 May 2014
- Preceded by: District created
- Succeeded by: Council abolished
- Constituency: Coleraine Central
- In office 15 May 1985 – 19 May 1993
- Preceded by: District created
- Succeeded by: District abolished
- Constituency: Coleraine Town
- In office 18 May 1977 – 15 May 1985
- Preceded by: James Edwards
- Succeeded by: District abolished
- Constituency: Coleraine Area C

Member of the Northern Ireland Assembly for Londonderry
- In office 20 October 1982 – 1986
- Preceded by: Assembly reconvened
- Succeeded by: Assembly dissolved

Member of the Northern Ireland Constitutional Convention for Londonderry
- In office 1975–1976
- Preceded by: Convention established
- Succeeded by: Convention dissolved

Personal details
- Born: 15 June 1926 Coleraine, County Londonderry, Northern Ireland
- Died: 3 August 2014 (aged 88)
- Party: Democratic Unionist

William James McClure MBE (15 June 1926 – 3 August 2014) was a Northern Irish unionist politician, based in Coleraine, who served as President of the Democratic Unionist Party (DUP).

McClure was also a Coleraine Borough Councillor from 1977 to 2014.

== Background ==
=== Political career ===
McClure was first elected in 1975 to the Northern Ireland Constitutional Convention representing Londonderry. He was elected to the Northern Ireland Assembly in 1982 for the same constituency. In 1977, he was elected to Coleraine Borough Council, representing the Area C District. serving as Mayor from 1983 to 1984, and from 1997 to 1999, and as Deputy Mayor from 1982 to 1983, 1985–93, and 2004–05. He served on the Coleraine Policing and Community Safety Partnership.

McClure remained a councillor until the reform of local government in 2014, which saw Coleraine Borough Council merge with the Limavady, Ballymoney and Moyle boroughs to create the Causeway Coast and Glens Borough Council.

=== Personal life and death ===
McClure was a fundamentalist Protestant and a member of the Independent Orange Order. He was an opponent of commercial trading, gambling and football games being played on Sundays, arguing that "the Christian Sabbath is a day for God not for gambling. It is a day for worshipping the Saviour, not for sport."

McClure died on 3 August 2014 at the age of 88.

Northern Ireland Constitutional Convention
New convention	Member for Londonderry; 1975–1976	Convention dissolved
Northern Ireland Assembly (1982)
New assembly	MPA for Londonderry; 1982–1986	Assembly abolished
Civic offices
Preceded by G. A. McIlraith	Mayor of Coleraine; 1983–1984	Succeeded by William King
Preceded by Pauline Armitage	Mayor of Coleraine; 1997–1999	Succeeded by Norman Hillis
Party political offices
Preceded by William Beattie	Chairman of the Democratic Unionist Party; 1981?–2000?	Succeeded by Maurice Morrow
