= East Londonderry (UK Parliament constituency) =

UK Parliament constituency (since 1983)

Coordinates: 54.946°N 6.953°W

- County constituency for the House of Commons
- Interactive map of boundaries from 2024
- Boundary within Northern Ireland
- District: Causeway Coast and Glens (part), Derry and Strabane (part)
- Electorate: 63,491 (December 2019)
- Major settlements: Coleraine, Limavady and Dungiven

Current constituency
- Created: 1983
- Member of Parliament: Gregory Campbell (DUP)
- Seats: 1
- Created from: Londonderry, Mid Ulster and North Antrim

East Londonderry is a constituency in Northern Ireland represented in the House of Commons of the UK Parliament. Its current Member of Parliament (MP) has been Gregory Campbell of the Democratic Unionist Party since 2001.

== Constituency profile ==
This is a mostly rural constituency stretching from the hill country of the Sperrin Mountains in the south to the Atlantic coast in the north; and from the suburbs of Derry city in the west to the River Bann in the east. The constituency's two main towns are Limavady and Coleraine; other urban areas include the upland town of Dungiven; and the coastal resorts of Portstewart and Portrush (the latter in fact lies in Country Antrim).

== Boundaries ==
The seat was created in boundary changes in 1983, as part of an expansion of Northern Ireland's constituencies from 12 to 17, and was predominantly made up from the old Londonderry constituency, minus the area around the city of Derry itself which formed the new Foyle constituency.

From further revisions in 1995 (when it lost parts of the district of Magherafelt to the Mid Ulster constituency), and until the 2008 revision, it covered exactly the same area as the districts of Coleraine and Limavady. The inclusion of all of Coleraine Borough means that part of the East Londonderry constituency is actually in County Antrim.

For the 2010 general election, the East Londonderry constituency was formed by the following local government areas, as confirmed by the Northern Ireland Parliamentary Constituencies Order.

- The entire local government districts of Limavady and Coleraine.
- Banagher, and Claudy, from the Londonderry district.

Prior to the 2024 general election, the following additions were made to the East Londonderry constituency:

- The entire ward of Eglinton is transferred from Foyle.
- The entire ward of Claudy, which was split between Foyle and East Londonderry, is assigned to East Londonderry.

== History ==
The constituency has a Unionist plurality although, in many elections, nationalists have polled 40% of the vote, and the non-sectarian Alliance Party sometimes above 10%. Until the 2010 election the main interest in elections had been the contest between the Ulster Unionist Party and the Democratic Unionist Party. The UUP were normally ahead of the DUP until the 2001 general election, when the DUP finally overtook them.

The 2001 election was seen at a province-wide level as a battle over the Belfast Agreement, with the DUP opposed to it and most of the UUP in favour. However, that situation was seemingly reversed in East Londonderry, in which the sitting Ulster Unionist MP, William Ross, was completely opposed to all involvement with the Agreement and its institutions, whilst the DUP candidate, Gregory Campbell, was a minister in the executive set up by the agreement. Many commentators joked that the DUP's gain meant that East Londonderry now had a more pro-agreement MP than before.

In the 2016 EU referendum 21,098 people in the constituency voted to remain in the European Union, 19,455 voted to leave, and 10 votes were rejected.

Unionist candidates failed to get a majority of the votes for the first time at the 2019 election, although they secured a plurality of votes. The seat had a considerable swing to Sinn Féin in the 2024 general election of over 12%, but the DUP retained the constituency, albeit with a very narrow majority of 179 votes.

== Members of Parliament ==
The Member of Parliament since the 2001 general election is Gregory Campbell of the Democratic Unionist Party. In that election he defeated William Ross of the Ulster Unionist Party who had represented East Londonderry since 1983 and its predecessor seat of Londonderry between 1974 and 1983.

Election	Member	Party
1983	William Ross	UUP
2001	Gregory Campbell	DUP

== Elections ==
=== Elections in the 2020s ===
2024 general election: East Londonderry
Party	Candidate	Votes	%	±%
DUP	Gregory Campbell	11,506	27.9	−12.1
Sinn Féin	Kathleen McGurk	11,327	27.4	+12.0
SDLP	Cara Hunter	5,260	12.7	−3.7
TUV	Allister Kyle	4,363	10.6	New
Alliance	Richard Stewart	3,734	9.0	−5.5
UUP	Glen Miller	3,412	8.3	−0.8
Aontú	Gemma Brolly	1,043	2.5	−1.8
Green (NI)	Jen McCahon	445	1.1	New
NI Conservatives	Claire Scull	187	0.5	New
Majority		179	0.5	−23.9
Turnout		41,277	54.5	−2.3
Registered electors		75,707		
DUP hold		Swing	−12.1	

=== Elections in the 2010s ===
2019 general election: East Londonderry
Party	Candidate	Votes	%	±%
DUP	Gregory Campbell	15,765	40.1	−8.0
SDLP	Cara Hunter	6,158	15.7	+4.9
Sinn Féin	Dermot Nicholl	6,128	15.6	−10.9
Alliance	Chris McCaw	5,921	15.1	+8.9
UUP	Richard Holmes	3,599	9.2	+1.6
Aontú	Seán McNicholl	1,731	4.4	New
Majority		9,607	24.4	+2.8
Turnout		39,302	56.8	−4.4
Registered electors		69,194		
DUP hold		Swing	−6.5	

2017 general election: East Londonderry
Party	Candidate	Votes	%	±%
DUP	Gregory Campbell	19,723	48.1	+5.9
Sinn Féin	Dermot Nicholl	10,881	26.5	+6.7
SDLP	Stephanie Quigley	4,423	10.8	−1.5
UUP	Richard Holmes	3,135	7.6	−7.8
Alliance	Chris McCaw	2,538	6.2	−1.4
NI Conservatives	Liz St Clair-Legge	330	0.8	−0.4
Majority		8,842	21.6	−0.8
Turnout		40,580	61.2	+9.3
Registered electors		67,038		
DUP hold		Swing	-0.5	

2015 general election: East Londonderry
Party	Candidate	Votes	%	±%
DUP	Gregory Campbell	14,663	42.2	+7.6
Sinn Féin	Caoimhe Archibald	6,859	19.8	+0.5
UUP	William McCandless	5,333	15.4	−2.4
SDLP	Gerry Mullan	4,268	12.3	−3.1
Alliance	Yvonne Boyle	2,642	7.6	+2.1
CISTA	Neil Paine	527	1.5	New
NI Conservatives	Liz St Clair-Legge	422	1.2	New
Majority		7,804	22.4	+7.1
Turnout		34,714	51.9	−3.4
Registered electors		66,926		
DUP hold		Swing	+3.5	

2010 general election: East Londonderry
Party	Candidate	Votes	%	±%
DUP	Gregory Campbell	12,097	34.6	−6.3
Sinn Féin	Cathal Ó hOisín	6,742	19.3	+1.9
UCU-NF	Lesley Macaulay	6,218	17.8	−1.9
SDLP	Thomas Conway	5,399	15.4	−3.9
TUV	William Ross	2,572	7.4	New
Alliance	Barney Fitzpatrick	1,922	5.5	+3.1
Majority		5,355	15.3	−6.5
Turnout		34,950	55.3	−8.4
Registered electors		63,220		
DUP hold		Swing	−5.7	

=== Elections in the 2000s ===
2005 general election: East Londonderry
Party	Candidate	Votes	%	±%
DUP	Gregory Campbell	15,225	42.9	+10.8
UUP	David McClarty	7,498	21.1	−6.3
SDLP	John Dallat	6,077	17.1	−3.7
Sinn Féin	Billy Leonard	5,709	16.1	+0.5
Alliance	Yvonne Boyle	924	2.6	−1.5
Independent	Malcolm Harry Samuel	71	0.2	New
Majority		7,727	21.8	+17.1
Turnout		35,504	60.3	−5.9
Registered electors		58,461		
DUP hold		Swing	+8.5	

2001 general election: East Londonderry
Party	Candidate	Votes	%	±%
DUP	Gregory Campbell	12,813	32.1	+6.1
UUP	William Ross	10,912	27.4	−8.6
SDLP	John Dallat	8,298	20.8	−1.2
Sinn Féin	Francie Brolly	6,221	15.6	+6.6
Alliance	Yvonne Boyle	1,625	4.1	−1.9
Majority		1,901	4.7	N/A
Turnout		39,869	66.2	+1.4
Registered electors		60,215		
DUP gain from UUP		Swing	−7.4	

=== Elections in the 1990s ===
1997 general election: East Londonderry
Party	Candidate	Votes	%	±%
UUP	William Ross	13,558	36.0	−29.1
DUP	Gregory Campbell	9,767	26.0	New
SDLP	Arthur Doherty	8,273	22.0	+1.9
Sinn Féin	Malachy O'Kane	3,463	9.0	+5.5
Alliance	Yvonne Boyle	2,427	6.0	−1.3
NI Conservatives	James Holmes	436	1.0	−3.4
Natural Law	Clare Gallen	100	0.3	New
National Democrats	Ian Anderson	81	0.2	New
Majority		3,794	10.0	−25.2
Turnout		38,102	64.8	−5.0
Registered electors		58,938		
UUP hold		Swing	−23.8	

1997 changes are compared to the notional figures from 1992.

Notional 1992 UK general election result: East Londonderry
Party	Candidate	Votes	%	±%
UUP	N/A	23,287	64.9	N/A
SDLP	N/A	7,134	19.9	N/A
Alliance	N/A	2,634	7.3	N/A
NI Conservatives	N/A	1,589	4.4	N/A
Sinn Féin	N/A	1,261	3.5	N/A
Registered electors		N/A		
Majority		16,153	45.0	N/A

1992 general election: East Londonderry
Party	Candidate	Votes	%	±%
UUP	William Ross	30,370	57.6	−2.9
SDLP	Arthur Doherty	11,843	22.4	+3.2
Sinn Féin	Pauline Davey-Kennedy	5,320	10.1	−1.1
Alliance	Patrick McGowan	3,613	6.8	+0.2
NI Conservatives	Allan Elder	1,589	3.0	New
Majority		18,527	35.2	0.0
Turnout		52,735	69.8	+1.1
Registered electors		75,587		
UUP hold		Swing		

=== Elections in the 1980s ===
1987 general election: East Londonderry
Party	Candidate	Votes	%	±%
UUP	William Ross	29,532	60.5	+22.6
SDLP	Arthur Doherty	9,375	19.2	+0.9
Sinn Féin	John Davey	5,464	11.2	−2.6
Alliance	Patrick McGowan	3,237	6.6	+1.9
Workers' Party	Francie Donnelly	935	1.9	+0.3
Green	Malcolm Samuel	281	0.6	New
Majority		20,157	35.2	+21.1
Turnout		48,824	68.7	−9.6
Registered electors		71,031		
UUP hold		Swing		

By-election 1986: East Londonderry
Party	Candidate	Votes	%	±%
UUP	William Ross	30,922	93.9	+56.0
"For the Anglo-Irish Agreement"	"Peter Barry" (Wesley Robert Williamson)	2,001	6.1	New
Majority		28,921	87.8	+73.7
Turnout		32,923	46.8	−29.5
Registered electors		70,038		
UUP hold		Swing	N/A	

1983 general election: East Londonderry
Party	Candidate	Votes	%	±%
UUP	William Ross	19,469	37.9	
DUP	James McClure	12,207	23.8	
SDLP	Arthur Doherty	9,397	18.3	
Sinn Féin	John Davey	7,073	13.8	
Alliance	Martha McGrath	2,401	4.7	
Workers' Party	Francie Donnelly	819	1.6	
Majority		7,262	14.1	
Turnout		51,366	76.3	
Registered electors		67,306		
UUP win (new seat)				

== Demographics ==
On Census day 2021 there were 103,285 people living in the East Londonderry parliamentary constituency. Of these:

- 42.5% (43,869) belong to or were brought up in the Catholic Christian faith and 48.7% (50,342) belong to or were brought up in various 'Protestant and Other Christian (including Christian related)' denominations. 0.8% (871) belong to other religions and 7.9% (8,203) had no religious background.
- 36.6% (37,829) indicated that they had a British only identity, 22.9% (23,639) had an Irish only identity and 23.3% (24,083) had a Northern Irish only identity (respondents could indicate more than one national identity).

== See also ==
- List of parliamentary constituencies in Northern Ireland
