= East Londonderry (Assembly constituency) =

Constituency of the Northern Ireland Assembly

Coordinates: 54.974°N 6.937°W

- Constituency for the Northern Ireland Assembly

Current Constituency
- Created: 1996
- Seats: 6 (1996–2016); 5 (2017–)
- MLAs: Caoimhe Archibald (SF); Maurice Bradley (DUP); Cara Hunter (SDLP); Alan Robinson (DUP); Claire Sugden (Ind)
- Districts: Causeway Coast and Glens District Council

East Londonderry is a constituency in the Northern Ireland Assembly.

The seat was first used for a Northern Ireland-only election for the Northern Ireland Forum in 1996. Since 1998, it has elected members to the current Assembly.

For Assembly elections prior to 1996, the constituency was largely part of the Londonderry constituency with a small part around Portrush coming from North Antrim constituency. Since 1997, it has usually shared boundaries with the East Londonderry UK Parliament constituency, with the exception of from 2010 to 2011, and from 2024 to 2027.

For further details of the history and boundaries of the constituency, see East Londonderry (UK Parliament constituency).

== Members ==
Election	MLA (party)	MLA (party)	MLA (party)	MLA (party)	MLA (party)	MLA (party)
1996	Arthur Doherty (SDLP)	5 seats 1996–1998	David Brewster (UUP)	John White (UUP)	Robert Bolton (DUP)	Robert Stewart (DUP)
1998	Arthur Doherty (SDLP)	John Dallat (SDLP)	David McClarty (UUP/ Independent; Unionist)	Pauline Armitage (UUP)	Boyd Douglas (Independent; Unionist)	Gregory Campbell (DUP)
September 2002 co-option	Michael Coyle (SDLP)	John Dallat (SDLP)	David McClarty (UUP/ Independent; Unionist)	Pauline Armitage (UUP)	Boyd Douglas (Independent; Unionist)	Gregory Campbell (DUP)
2003	Francis Brolly (Sinn Féin)	John Dallat (SDLP)	David McClarty (UUP/ Independent; Unionist)	Norman Hillis (UUP)	George Robinson (DUP)	Gregory Campbell (DUP)
2007	Francis Brolly (Sinn Féin)	John Dallat (SDLP)	David McClarty (UUP/ Independent; Unionist)	Adrian McQuillan (DUP)	George Robinson (DUP)	Gregory Campbell (DUP)
January 2010 co-option	Billy Leonard (Sinn Féin)	John Dallat (SDLP)	David McClarty (UUP/ Independent; Unionist)	Adrian McQuillan (DUP)	George Robinson (DUP)	Gregory Campbell (DUP)
January 2011 resignation	Billy Leonard (Sinn Féin)	John Dallat (SDLP)	David McClarty (UUP/ Independent; Unionist)	Adrian McQuillan (DUP)	George Robinson (DUP)	Gregory Campbell (DUP)
2011	Cathal Ó hOisín (Sinn Féin)	John Dallat (SDLP)	David McClarty (UUP/ Independent; Unionist)	Adrian McQuillan (DUP)	George Robinson (DUP)	Gregory Campbell (DUP)
May 2014 co-option	Cathal Ó hOisín (Sinn Féin)	John Dallat (SDLP)	Claire Sugden (Independent Unionist)	Adrian McQuillan (DUP)	George Robinson (DUP)	Gregory Campbell (DUP)
2016	Caoimhe Archibald (Sinn Féin)	Gerry Mullan (SDLP)	Claire Sugden (Independent Unionist)	Adrian McQuillan (DUP)	George Robinson (DUP)	Maurice Bradley (DUP)
2017	Caoimhe Archibald (Sinn Féin)	John Dallat (SDLP)	Claire Sugden (Independent Unionist)	5 seats 2017–present	George Robinson (DUP)	Maurice Bradley (DUP)
May 2020 co-option	Caoimhe Archibald (Sinn Féin)	Cara Hunter (SDLP)	Claire Sugden (Independent Unionist)	5 seats 2017–present	George Robinson (DUP)	Maurice Bradley (DUP)
2022	Caoimhe Archibald (Sinn Féin)	Cara Hunter (SDLP)	Claire Sugden (Independent Unionist)	5 seats 2017–present	Alan Robinson (DUP)	Maurice Bradley (DUP)

Note: The columns in this table are used only for presentational purposes, and no significance should be attached to the order of columns. For details of the order in which seats were won at each election, see the detailed results of that election.

== Elections ==
=== Northern Ireland Assembly ===
==== 2027 ====
2027 Assembly election: East Londonderry – 5 seats
Party	Candidate	FPv%	Count
Party	Candidate	FPv%	1
Sinn Féin	Caoimhe Archibald		
Alliance	Richard Brown-Stewart		
TUV	Allister Kyle		
Sinn Féin	Kathleen McGurk		
UUP	Matthew Robinson		
Ind. Unionist	Claire Sugden		

==== 2022 ====
2022 Assembly election: East Londonderry – 5 seats
Party	Candidate	FPv%	Count									
Party	Candidate	FPv%	1	2	3	4	5	6	7	8	9	10
DUP	**Maurice Bradley**	15.30%	6,786	6,791	6,807	7,221	7,249	**7,401**				
DUP	**Alan Robinson**	11.61%	5,151	5,160	5,166	5,223	5,248	5,323	6,120	**8,218**		
Ind. Unionist	**Claire Sugden**	8.97%	3,981	4,006	4,084	4,169	4,202	4,951	5,854	6,632	7,329	**8,476**
Sinn Féin	**Caoimhe Archibald**	15.48%	6,868	6,886	6,945	6,945	7,163	7,244	7,248	7,253	7,253	**7,453**
SDLP	**Cara Hunter**	8.26%	3,664	3,696	3,837	3,843	4,075	4,270	4,391	4,478	4,513	**6,484**
Sinn Féin	Kathleen McGurk	10.14%	4,500	4,528	4,558	4,558	4,690	4,713	4,713	4,715	4,715	4,818
Alliance	Chris McCaw	7.52%	3,338	3,350	3,594	3,605	3,683	3,862	4,269	4,408	4,499	
TUV	Jordan Armstrong	6.67%	2,959	2,964	2,973	3,210	3,224	3,285	3,737			
UUP	Darryl Wilson	5.92%	2,625	2,628	2,644	2,737	2,740	2,818				
Independent	Stephanie Quigley	3.39%	1,503	1,562	1,613	1,630	1,805					
Aontú	Gemma Brolly	2.47%	1,095	1,136	1,159	1,160						
PUP	Russell Watton	2.10%	933	935	939							
Green (NI)	Mark Coulson	0.78%	347	352								
People Before Profit	Amy Merron	0.78%	347	353								
Independent	Niall Murphy	0.41%	181									
Independent	Billy Stewart	0.18%	82									
Electorate: 72,959 Valid: 44,360 (60.80%) Spoilt: 436 Quota: 7,394 Turnout: 44,796 (61.40%)

==== 2017 ====
2017 Assembly election: East Londonderry – 5 seats
Party	Candidate	FPv%	Count											
Party	Candidate	FPv%	1	2	3	4	5	6	7	8	9	10	11	12
Ind. Unionist	**Claire Sugden**	11.75%	4,918	4,990	5,102	5,278	5,437	5,707	6,561	**7,555**				
DUP	**Maurice Bradley**	13.00%	5,444	5,462	5,473	5,832	6,127	6,132	6,171	6,739	**8,056**			
DUP	**George Robinson**	11.26%	4,715	4,721	4,730	4,781	4,906	4,962	4,993	5,335	**7,801**			
Sinn Féin	**Caoimhe Archibald**	13.97%	5,851	5,854	5,934	5,937	5,940	6,166	6,299	6,311	6,320	6,320	6,328	**6,330**
SDLP	**John Dallat**	7.93%	3,319	3,325	3,440	3,443	3,459	3,725	4,366	5,143	5,298	5,443	5,709	**6,091**
Sinn Féin	Cathal Ó hOisín	11.83%	4,953	4,954	4,979	4,979	4,980	5,155	5,196	5,202	5,211	5,221	5,236	5,238
DUP	Adrian McQuillan	9.27%	3,881	3,887	3,890	3,994	4,135	4,142	4,170	4,566				
UUP	William McCandless	6.72%	2,814	2,866	2,899	2,960	3,268	3,288	3,581					
Alliance	Chris McCaw	4.40%	1,841	1,872	2,150	2,163	2,190	2,327						
Ind. Nationalist	Gerry Mullan	2.88%	1,204	1,206	1,290	1,297	1,314							
TUV	Jordan Armstrong	2.48%	1,038	1,048	1,056	1,147								
PUP	Russell Watton	2.10%	879	882	889									
People Before Profit	Gavin Campbell	1.17%	492	494										
Green (NI)	Anthony Flynn	0.73%	305	310										
NI Conservatives	David Harding	0.52%	219											
Electorate: 67,392 Valid: 41,873 (62.13%) Spoilt: 375 Quota: 6,979 Turnout: 42,248 (62.69%)

==== 2016 ====
2016 Assembly election: East Londonderry – 6 seats
Party	Candidate	FPv%	Count								
Party	Candidate	FPv%	1	2	3	4	5	6	7	8	9
DUP	**Maurice Bradley**	13.46%	4,630	4,689	4,767	**5,061**					
DUP	**George Robinson**	13.28%	4,567	4,616	4,711	**4,931**					
DUP	**Adrian McQuillan**	10.11%	3,477	3,523	3,551	3,703	3,789	3,794	3,865	4,608	**5,385**
Ind. Unionist	**Claire Sugden**	9.51%	3,270	3,488	3,521	3,615	3,619	3,620	4,106	4,459	**5,003**
SDLP	**Gerry Mullan**	9.49%	3,265	3,341	3,352	3,364	3,366	3,366	3,801	3,809	**4,172**
Sinn Féin	**Caoimhe Archibald**	11.63%	4,002	4,043	4,044	4,045	4,045	4,046	4,121	4,127	**4,139**
Sinn Féin	Cathal Ó hOisín	10.15%	3,493	3,514	3,514	3,514	3,514	3,514	3,522	3,524	3,533
UUP	William McCandless	5.20%	1,789	1,867	2,629	2,921	2,964	2,965	3,167	3,407	
PUP	Russell Watton	3.94%	1,356	1,399	1,403	1,535	1,544	1,546	1,553		
Alliance	Yvonne Boyle	3.65%	1,257	1,492	1,516	1,539	1,540	1,541			
TUV	Jordan Armstrong	3.46%	1,191	1,240	1,291						
UUP	Aaron Callan	3.10%	1,067	1,096							
Green (NI)	Amber Hamill	1.26%	434								
UKIP	Steven Parkhill	0.80%	274								
NI Conservatives	David Harding	0.63%	216								
Independent	Victor Christie	0.18%	61								
NI Conservatives	Stuart Canning	0.15%	50								
Electorate: 68,600 Valid: 34,399 (50.14%) Spoilt: 449 Quota: 4,915 Turnout: 34,848 (50.80%)

==== 2011 ====
2011 Assembly election: East Londonderry – 6 seats
Party	Candidate	FPv%	Count						
Party	Candidate	FPv%	1	2	3	4	5	6	7
DUP	**Gregory Campbell**	18.20%	**6,319**						
SDLP	**John Dallat**	8.55%	2,967	2,978.44	2,994.54	3,003.2	3,515.08	**5,207.08**	
Sinn Féin	**Cathal Ó hOisín**	13.48%	4,681	4,682.54	4,682.54	4,683.76	4,712.2	**4,962.2**	
DUP	**George Robinson**	11.10%	3,855	4,167.62	4,235.08	4,695.62	4,764.02	4,784.88	**4,823.1**
Ind. Unionist	**David McClarty**	8.65%	3,003	3,119.16	3,275.5	3,511.62	4,112.86	4,154.08	**4,405.08**
DUP	**Adrian McQuillan**	7.58%	2,633	3,298.72	3,368.36	3,609.84	3,701.78	3,718.44	**3,781.66**
UUP	David Harding	4.20%	1,458	1,531.92	2,580.42	3,131.1	3,399.84	3,427.38	3,460.6
Sinn Féin	Bernadette Archibald	7.60%	2,639	2,640.96	2,643.98	2,646.98	2,673.98	2,771.2	
SDLP	Thomas Conway	6.40%	2,222	2,228.16	2,231.38	2,243.98	2,362.58		
Alliance	Barney Fitzpatrick	5.49%	1,905	1,932.28	2,005.7	2,040.46			
TUV	Boyd Douglas	4.52%	1,568	1,647.42	1,703.18				
UUP	Lesley Macaulay	4.24%	1,472	1,530.3					
Electorate: 65,226 Valid: 34,722 (53.23%) Spoilt: 581 Quota: 4,961 Turnout: 35,303 (54.12%)

Note: David McClarty appeared on the ballot paper with no description, however had previously made clear that he was fighting the election as an Independent Unionist.

==== 2007 ====
2007 Assembly election: East Londonderry – 6 seats
Party	Candidate	FPv%	Count								
Party	Candidate	FPv%	1	2	3	4	5	6	7	8	9
DUP	**Gregory Campbell**	20.18%	**6,845**								
DUP	**George Robinson**	11.77%	3,991	4,437.31	4,448.21	4,631.65	**4,869.65**				
Sinn Féin	**Francis Brolly**	13.19%	4,476	4,476.58	4,691.58	4,709.87	4,709.87	4,727.87	**5,002.87**		
SDLP	**John Dallat**	7.78%	2,638	2,647.57	2,690.57	2,749.73	2,755.73	3,143.89	4,733.34	**6,380.34**	
UUP	**David McClarty**	8.48%	2,875	3,037.11	3,048.27	3,156.39	3,763.61	4,205.99	4,238.28	4,279.28	**4,409.28**
DUP	**Adrian McQuillan**	7.81%	2,650	3,779.84	3,787	3,931.6	3,974.85	4,042.39	4,046.68	4,053.97	**4,073.97**
UUP	Norman Hillis	6.06%	2,054	2,172.61	2,177.19	2,299.11	2,797.62	3,101.97	3,118.84	3,140.13	3,195.13
Sinn Féin	Billy Leonard	6.84%	2,321	2,322.74	2,338.74	2,364.03	2,366.03	2,402.32	2,457.32		
SDLP	Orla Beattie	5.30%	1,797	1,800.77	1,836.77	1,898.06	1,916.35	2,097.64			
Alliance	Bernard Fitzpatrick	4.13%	1,401	1,422.17	1,430.17	1,651.65	1,670.94				
UUP	Edwin Stevenson	3.94%	1,338	1,357.14	1,361.14	1,456.49					
UK Unionist	Leslie Cubitt	1.62%	549	594.82	601.11						
Green (NI)	Phillippe Moison	1.54%	521	529.7	563.7						
Republican Sinn Féin	Michael McGonigle	1.16%	393	395.03							
Independent	Victor Christie	0.22%	73	77.35							
Electorate: 56,104 Valid: 33,922 (60.46%) Spoilt: 258 Quota: 4,847 Turnout: 34,180 (60.92%)

==== 2003 ====
2003 Assembly election: East Londonderry – 6 seats
Party	Candidate	FPv%	Count											
Party	Candidate	FPv%	1	2	3	4	5	6	7	8	9	10	11	12
DUP	**Gregory Campbell**	13.97%	4,789	4,803	**5,023**									
UUP	**David McClarty**	11.87%	4,069	4,288	4,414	**5,176**								
Sinn Féin	**Francis Brolly**	11.73%	4,019	4,051	4,056	4,056	4,056.37	4,056.99	**5,895.99**					
DUP	**George Robinson**	10.11%	3,466	3,474	3,514	3,613	3,617.07	3,641.87	3,643.87	3,644.7	4,741.99	**7,346.99**		
UUP	**Norman Hillis**	6.69%	2,292	2,377	2,527	2,959	3,199.87	3,220.95	3,222.95	3,223.78	3,883.84	4,319.92	**5,346.92**	
SDLP	**John Dallat**	9.31%	3,190	3,430	3,455	3,468	3,472.81	3,474.05	3,565.05	3,734.37	3,759.99	3,778.23	3,794.23	**3,870.23**
SDLP	Michael Coyle	6.99%	2,394	2,525	2,532	2,546	2,548.59	2,548.59	2,700.59	3,514.82	3,526.82	3,534.47	3,545.47	3,652.47
DUP	Maurice Bradley	8.27%	2,836	2,848	3,035	3,040	3,043.33	3,091.07	3,095.07	3,096.73	3,373.52			
Independent	Boyd Douglas	5.55%	1,903	1,923	2,049	2,171	2,190.61	2,219.75	2,220.75	2,221.58				
Sinn Féin	Cliona O'Kane	6.13%	2,102	2,110	2,111	2,114	2,114	2,114						
UUP	Edwin Stevenson	4.11%	1,408	1,443	1,466									
UK Unionist	Pauline Armitage	2.64%	906	937										
Alliance	Yvonne Boyle	2.22%	762											
Socialist Environmental	Marion Baur	0.40%	137											
Electorate: 56,203 Valid: 34,273 (60.98%) Spoilt: 430 Quota: 4,897 Turnout: 34,703 (61.75%)

==== 1998 ====
1998 Assembly election: East Londonderry – 6 seats
Party	Candidate	FPv%	Count								
Party	Candidate	FPv%	1	2	3	4	5	6	7	8	9
DUP	**Gregory Campbell**	15.42%	**6,099**								
UUP	**David McClarty**	12.91%	5,108	5,324	5,347.8	5,351.8	**6,268.8**				
SDLP	**John Dallat**	12.03%	4,760	4,782	4,783.33	4,858.33	4,869.54	**5,708.54**			
SDLP	**Arthur Doherty**	11.64%	4,606	4,619	4,619.77	4,773.77	4,780.84	5,178.54	5,187.77	**7,754.77**	
UUP	**Pauline Armitage**	8.38%	3,315	3,432	3,452.79	3,452.79	3,865.7	4,703.12	5,227.1	5,229.1	**5,379.1**
Ind. Unionist	**Boyd Douglas**	9.63%	3,811	3,892	3,937.22	3,938.22	4,048.06	4,152.06	4,201.76	4,217.54	**4,259.54**
DUP	George Robinson	8.29%	3,280	3,390	3,709.06	3,709.2	3,774.7	3,805.19	3,834.3	3,842.3	3,867.3
Sinn Féin	Malachy O'Kane	6.37%	2,521	2,525	2,525.07	3,601.07	3,604.07	3,621.07	3,621.78		
Alliance	Barbara Dempsey	6.05%	2,395	2,476	2,477.96	2,480.96	2,520.03				
UUP	Roger McPherson	3.87%	1,531	1,608	1,615.42	1,615.42					
Sinn Féin	John McIlhenny	3.38%	1,339	1,347	1,347.14						
PUP	Dave Gilmour	1.47%	582								
Ulster Democratic	David Nelson	0.43%	171								
Natural Law	Maura McCann	0.12%	46								
Electorate: 59,370 Valid: 39,564 (66.64%) Spoilt: 603 Quota: 5,653 Turnout: 40,167 (67.66%)

==== 1996 forum ====
Successful candidates are shown in bold.

Party	Candidate(s)	Votes	Percentage
UUP	**David Brewster**; **John White**; Pauline Armitage; Antony Alcock; Elizabeth Black	11,386	30.9
DUP	**Robert Bolton**; **Robert Stewart**; Victor Wilson	8,768	23.8
SDLP	**Arthur Doherty**; John Dallat; Patricia Farren; Gerald McLaughlin; Michael Coyle	7,451	20.3
Sinn Féin	Malachy O'Kane; Thomas Donaghey; Kevin Kelly; John McCloskey; Kathleen Kelly	3,413	9.3
Alliance	Yvonne Boyle; Bill Mathews; Paddy McGowan	2,107	5.7
UK Unionist	Kingsley Nutt; Angela Nutt	1,040	2.8
Ulster Democratic	Allister Crawford; Robert Mitchell	728	2.0
PUP	William Smith; William Mitchell	652	1.8
NI Women's Coalition	Avril Watson; Mary Mulholland; Pauline Nellis	375	1.0
Labour coalition	Fionnuala Harbinson; Alan McKee; Peter Scott; John Quigley	241	0.6
NI Conservatives	Hubert Mullan; John McKeown	208	0.6
Green (NI)	David Surplus; Adeline Curry	189	0.5
Ulster Independence	Bartholomew Hamilton; Hugh Kerr; John Walker	100	0.3
Workers' Party	Marian Donnelly; James McLaughlin	75	0.2
Democratic Left	Odran Dunphy; Colm Campbell	45	0.1
Natural Law	Brian McEnery; Lee Silvera	14	0.0
Independent Chambers	Jonathan Chambers; Maureen Holmes; Neill Chambers	5	0.0
