= David McClarty =

British politician (1951–2014)

Deputy Speaker of the Northern Ireland Assembly
- In office 8 May 2007 – 11 May 2011
- Preceded by: Jim Wilson (2003)
- Succeeded by: Roy Beggs Jr

Member of the Northern Ireland Assembly for East Londonderry
- In office 25 June 1998 – 18 April 2014
- Preceded by: New Creation
- Succeeded by: Claire Sugden

Mayor of Coleraine
- In office 1993–1995
- Preceded by: William King
- Succeeded by: Pauline Armitage

Member of Coleraine Borough Council
- In office 19 May 1993 – 2013
- Preceded by: District created
- Succeeded by: Clare Sugden
- Constituency: Coleraine Central
- In office 17 May 1989 – 19 May 1993
- Preceded by: Robert Bolton
- Succeeded by: District abolished
- Constituency: Coleraine Town

Personal details
- Born: 23 February 1951 Coleraine, Northern Ireland
- Died: 18 April 2014 (aged 63) Coleraine, Northern Ireland
- Party: Independent Unionist (2011 - 2014)
- Other political affiliations: UUP (until 2011)
- Spouse: Norma
- Children: 2
- Education: University of Ulster

David McClarty (23 February 1951 – 18 April 2014) was a Northern Irish unionist politician who served as an Ulster Unionist Party (UUP), later an Independent Member of the Legislative Assembly (MLA) for East Londonderry from 1998, until his death in 2014.

== Background ==
McClarty was from Coleraine and was educated at Coleraine Academical Institution and Magee College. McClarty was first elected to Coleraine Borough Council in 1989, and held the post of Mayor from 1993 to 1995.

== Assembly career ==
Until 1 January 2011 he was an Ulster Unionist Party member of the Northern Ireland Assembly (1998–present) for East Londonderry and was the Ulster Unionist Party’s chief whip at the Assembly but since then, vowed to fight future elections as an independent. On 8 May 2007, he was elected as one of the three Deputy Speakers of the Assembly.

McClarty served on the Enterprise, Trade and Investment Committee and the Environment Committee in the Assembly from 1998 to 2002.

=== Party allegiance ===
He was one of a number of high-profile Ulster Unionist moderates who left the party along with Harry Hamilton and Paula Bradshaw, both of whom joined the Alliance Party of Northern Ireland, and Trevor Ringland, who joined the NI Conservatives.

McClarty appeared to dismiss speculation about switching to the Alliance by saying, "It has been suggested that, with my moderate views, I should go Alliance like Harry Hamilton in Upper Bann. But Alliance are lukewarm on the union, and I will be fighting as an Independent Unionist." He retained his seat in the Assembly in the 2011 election.

There was speculation that McClarty would rejoin the UUP after Mike Nesbitt was elected leader in March 2012. Following Tom Elliott's departure and Nesbitt's subsequent election, McClarty said "I still have an interest in the wellbeing of the party." He went on to indicate that, as a sign of respect for those who voted for him as an independent candidate, he would not rejoin the UUP before the next election.

In early 2013, McClarty was in talks with John McCallister and Basil McCrea, who were both elected as MLAs for the UUP but left the party in February 2013. The three were considering registering as an informal grouping within the Assembly. (McCallister and McCrea went on to form NI21 later in the year.)

== Personal life ==
He was made a Freeman of the City of London in 1994. He was married to Norma.

He was a well known fixture for local theatre lovers with a long history of performing in various musicals for Ballywillan Drama Group.

== Death ==
McClarty died on 18 April 2014 following an illness. He had been suffering from cancer for some time beforehand.

Civic offices
Preceded by William King	Mayor of Coleraine; 1993–1995	Succeeded by Pauline Armitage
Northern Ireland Assembly
New assembly	MLA for East Londonderry; 1998–2014	Succeeded by Claire Sugden
Preceded by Donovan McClelland; Jane Morrice; Jim Wilson	Deputy Speaker; 2007–2011; With: Francie Molloy 2007–2011; John Dallat 2007–2016	Succeeded by Roy Beggs Jr; John Dallat
