= Coleraine Borough Council =

Coordinates: 55.132°N 6.668°W

Coleraine Borough
- Area: 486 km^{2} (188 sq mi); Ranked 13th of 26
- District HQ: Coleraine
- Catholic: 28%
- Protestant: 65.3%
- Country: Northern Ireland
- Sovereign state: United Kingdom
- Councillors: MLAs East Londonderry DUP: 2 Independent: 1 Sinn Féin: 1 SDLP: 1; MPs Gregory Campbell (DUP)
- Website: www.colerainebc.gov.uk

Map of the borough's DEAs from 1993 to 2014

Coleraine Borough Council was a local council mainly in County Londonderry and partly in County Antrim in Northern Ireland. It merged with Ballymoney Borough Council, Limavady Borough Council and Moyle District Council in May 2015 under local government reorganisation in Northern Ireland to become Causeway Coast and Glens District Council.

Its headquarters were in the town of Coleraine. Small towns in the area include Garvagh, Portrush, Portstewart and Kilrea.

Coleraine Borough Council consisted of four electoral areas: Coleraine East, Coleraine Central, The Skerries and Bann. The council last had 22 members from the following political parties: 8 Democratic Unionist Party (DUP), 6 Ulster Unionist Party (UUP), 3 Social Democratic and Labour Party (SDLP), 2 Alliance Party 1 Sinn Féin and 2 Independent. Unionist-controlled Coleraine Borough Council operated a rotation for positions of Mayor and Deputy Mayor between the UUP, DUP and the Irish nationalist SDLP. The last election was due to take place in May 2009, but on 25 April 2008, Shaun Woodward, Secretary of State for Northern Ireland announced that the scheduled 2009 district council elections were to be postponed until the introduction of the eleven new councils in 2011. The proposed reforms were abandoned in 2010, and the most recent district council elections took place in 2011

The borough council area, together with the neighbouring district of Limavady and part of Derry City Council, formed the East Londonderry constituency for elections to the Westminster Parliament and Northern Ireland Assembly.

== Mayor of Coleraine ==
Source: Freedom of Information request to Coleraine Borough Council

Year	Name	Political affiliation	Deputy	Deputy's affiliation
1973–77	A. N. Clarke	UUP	John White	UUP
1977–1980	John White	UUP	G. A. McIlrath	UUP
1980–83	G A McIlrath	UUP	C. R. Crawford	Independent
1980–83	G A McIlrath	UUP	James McClure	DUP
1983–84	James McClure	DUP	C. R. Crawford	Independent
1984–86	William King	UUP	A. N. Clarke	UUP
1984–86	William King	UUP	James McClure	DUP
1986–88	Dr Gladys Black	UUP	James McClure	DUP
1988–1990	Jim Watt	UUP	James McClure	DUP
1990–92	Elizabeth Black	UUP	James McClure	DUP
1992–93	William King	UUP	James McClure	DUP
1993–1995	David McClarty	UUP	William Matthews	Alliance
1995–97	Pauline Armitage	UUP	John Dallat	SDLP
1997–99	James McClure	DUP	William Matthews	Alliance
1997–99	James McClure	DUP	Elizabeth Johnston	UUP
1999–2000	Norman Hillis	UUP	Olive Church	UUP
2000–01	Elizabeth Johnston	UUP	Barbara Dempsey	Alliance
2001–02	John Dallat	SDLP	Desmond Stewart	DUP
2002–03	Olive Church	UUP	Gerry McLaughlin	SDLP
2003–04	Desmond Stewart	DUP	Eamon Mullan	SDLP
2004–2005	Robert McPhearson	UUP	James McClure	DUP
2005–06	Timothy Deans	DUP	Maura Hickey	SDLP
2006–07	William King	UUP	Ellen Fielding	DUP
2007–08	Maurice Bradley	DUP	Elizabeth Johnston	UUP
2008–09	David Barbour	UUP	William Creelman	DUP
2009–10	Sandy Gilkinson	DUP	William King	UUP
2010–11	Norman Hillis	UUP	Sam Cole	DUP
2011–12	Maurice Bradley	DUP	William King	UUP
2012–13	Sam Cole	DUP	Maura Hickey	SDLP
2013–14	David Harding	UUP	Mark Fielding	DUP
2014–15	George Duddy	DUP	Yvonne Boyle	Alliance

* For 2015 onwards, see Causeway Coast and Glens District Council

== Population ==
The area covered by Coleraine Borough Council had a population of 60,067 residents according to the 2011 Northern Ireland census.

== See also ==
- Local government in Northern Ireland
