= 2001 Moyle District Council election =

Local government election in Northern Ireland

← 1997	7 June 2001	2005 →

All 15 seats to Moyle District Council 8 seats needed for a majority
	First party	Second party	Third party
Party	SDLP	Independent	DUP
Seats won	4	4	3
Seat change	▲1	▲2	0
	Fourth party	Fifth party	Sixth party
Party	UUP	Sinn Féin	Ind. Nationalist
Seats won	3	1	0
Seat change	0	0	▼2
	Seventh party
Party	Ind. Unionist
Seats won	0
Seat change	▼1
- Party with the most votes by district.

Elections to Moyle District Council were held on 7 June 2001 on the same day as the other Northern Irish local government elections. The election used three district electoral areas to elect a total of 15 councillors.

== Election results ==
Moyle District Council Election Result 2001
Party	Seats	Gains	Losses	Net gain/loss	Seats %	Votes %	Votes	+/−
Independent	4	3	1	▲2	26.7	32.5	2,360	▲19.4
SDLP	4	1	0	▲1	26.7	23.2	1,681	▲0.7
DUP	3	0	0	0	20.0	21.0	1,520	▲1.3
UUP	3	0	0	0	20.0	13.8	1,000	▼0.2
Sinn Féin	1	0	0	0	6.7	9.5	690	▲2.0

Note: "Votes" are the first preference votes.

== Districts summary ==
Results of the Moyle District Council election, 2001 by district
Ward	%	Cllrs	%	Cllrs	%	Cllrs	%	Cllrs	%	Cllrs	Total Cllrs
Ward	SDLP		DUP		UUP		Sinn Féin		Others		Total Cllrs
Ballycastle	32.3	2	14.2	1	15.5	1	12.2	0	25.8	1	5
Giant's Causeway	3.7	0	47.5	2	30.0	2	0.0	0	18.8	1	5
The Glens	29.8	2	7.0	0	0.0	0	14.4	1	48.8	2	5
Total	23.2	4	21.0	3	13.8	3	9.5	1	32.5	4	15

== Districts results ==
=== Ballycastle ===
1997: 2 x Independent, 1 x SDLP, 1 x UUP, 1 x DUP
2001: 2 x SDLP, 1 x UUP, 1 x DUP, 1 x Independent
1997-2001 Change: SDLP gain from Independent

Ballycastle - 5 seats
Party	Candidate	FPv%	Count						
Party	Candidate	FPv%	1	2	3	4	5	6	7
SDLP	Madeline Black	17.63%	429						
SDLP	Michael Molloy	14.67%	357	365	379.25	441.25			
UUP	Helen Harding*	15.57%	379	382	383.3	409.3			
Independent	Seamus Blaney*	12.61%	197	204	206.55	238.8	258.8	375.5	376.65
DUP	Gardiner Kane*	14.17%	345	345	345.05	355.05	357.05	363.05	365.12
Sinn Féin	Charlie Neill	12.16%	296	298	298.8	317.85	320.85	362.95	362.95
Independent	Liam McBride	8.30%	202	213	214.2	240.3	246.3		
Independent	Christopher McCaughan*	7.76%	189	195	195.95				
Independent	Anna Edwards	1.64%	40						
Electorate: 4,112 Valid: 2,434 (59.19%) Spoilt: 88 Quota: 406 Turnout: 2,522 (61.33%)

=== Giant's Causeway ===
1997: 2 x DUP, 2 x UUP, 1 x Independent Unionist
2001: 2 x DUP, 2 x UUP, 1 x Independent
1997-2001 Change: Independent Unionist becomes Independent

Giant's Causeway - 5 seats
Party	Candidate	FPv%	Count				
Party	Candidate	FPv%	1	2	3	4	5
DUP	David McAllister*	23.95%	495				
UUP	William Graham*	19.25%	398				
Independent	Price McConaghy*	17.76%	367				
DUP	George Hartin*	12.48%	258	323.41	330.03	335.73	337.97
UUP	Robert McIlroy*	10.79%	223	240.67	281.98	321.28	335.35
DUP	Ian Chestnutt	11.03%	228	291.86	294.86	302.66	306.65
SDLP	Moira McGouran	3.68%	76	76.31			
Independent	Thomas Palmer	1.06%	22	24.48			
Electorate: 3,123 Valid: 2,067 (66.19%) Spoilt: 47 Quota: 345 Turnout: 2,114 (67.69%)

=== The Glens ===
1997: 2 x SDLP, 2 x Independent Nationalist, 1 x Sinn Féin
2001: 2 x Sinn Féin, 2 x SDLP, 1 x Independent
1997-2001 Change: Independent Nationalists (two seats) become Independents

The Glens - 5 seats
Party	Candidate	FPv%	Count					
Party	Candidate	FPv%	1	2	3	4	5	6
Independent	Oliver McMullan*	24.40%	671					
SDLP	Catherine McCambridge	12.65%	348	359.55	365.55	387.21	458.16	468.16
Independent	Randal McDonnell*	11.49%	316	371.77	381.77	395.08	452.32	464.32
SDLP	Christine Blaney	10.22%	281	327.53	333.86	343.51	390.11	393.11
Sinn Féin	Monica Digney	7.85%	216	241.41	241.41	360.61	374.91	374.91
Independent	James McCarry*	10.15%	279	300.45	302.45	317.77	337.07	341.07
DUP	Evelyne Robinson	7.05%	194	194	231	232	232	
SDLP	Archie McIntosh*	6.91%	190	218.71	219.71	226.03		
Sinn Féin	Anne McAuley	6.47%	178	199.78	200.78			
Independent	James McAuley	2.80%	77	77.66				
Electorate: 4,037 Valid: 2,750 (68.12%) Spoilt: 52 Quota: 459 Turnout: 2,802 (69.41%)
