= 2005 Moyle District Council election =

Local government election in Northern Ireland

← 2001	5 May 2005	2011 →

All 15 seats to Moyle District Council 8 seats needed for a majority
	First party	Second party	Third party
Party	Sinn Féin	SDLP	UUP
Seats won	4	3	3
Seat change	▲3	▼1	Steady
	Fourth party	Fifth party
Party	Independent	DUP
Seats won	3	2
Seat change	▼1	▼1
- Party with the most votes by district.

Elections to Moyle District Council were held on 5 May 2005 on the same day as the other Northern Irish local government elections. The election used three district electoral areas to elect a total of 15 councillors.

== Election results ==
Moyle District Council Election Result 2005
Party	Seats	Gains	Losses	Net gain/loss	Seats %	Votes %	Votes	+/−
Sinn Féin	4	3	0	▲3	26.7	30.4	2,012	▲20.9
SDLP	3	0	1	▼1	20.0	21.0	1,394	▼2.2
Independent	3	0	1	▼1	20.0	14.3	949	▼18.2
UUP	3	0	0	Steady	20.0	12.4	821	▼1.4
DUP	2	0	1	▼1	13.3	21.9	1,448	▲0.9

Note: "Votes" are the first preference votes.

== Districts summary ==
Results of the Moyle District Council election, 2005 by district
Ward	%	Cllrs	%	Cllrs	%	Cllrs	%	Cllrs	%	Cllrs	Total Cllrs
Ward	Sinn Féin		SDLP		UUP		DUP		Others		Total Cllrs
Ballycastle	35.0	2	26.6	1	13.5	1	12.4	0	12.5	1	5
Giant's Causeway	0.0	0	0.0	0	29.4	2	56.2	2	14.4	1	5
The Glens	47.2	2	29.4	2	0.0	0	7.8	0	15.6	1	5
Total	30.4	4	21.0	3	12.4	3	21.9	2	14.3	3	15

== Districts results ==
=== Ballycastle ===
2001: 2 x SDLP, 1 x UUP, 1 x DUP, 1 x Independent
2005: 2 x Sinn Féin, 1 x SDLP, 1 x UUP, 1 x Independent
2001-2005 Change: Sinn Féin (two seats) gain from SDLP and DUP

Ballycastle - 5 seats
Party	Candidate	FPv%	Count					
Party	Candidate	FPv%	1	2	3	4	5	6
Sinn Féin	Cara McShane	22.76%	545					
Sinn Féin	Cathal Newcombe	12.23%	293	405.86				
SDLP	Madeline Black*	15.49%	371	379.1	380.1	381.66	590.66	
Independent	Seamus Blaney*	12.61%	302	321.98	322.98	325.46	357.13	460.13
UUP	Helen Harding*	13.49%	323	323.81	336.81	337.13	355.46	398.46
DUP	Ian Chestnutt	7.14%	171	171.27	274.27	274.27	275.27	279.27
SDLP	Michael Molloy*	11.06%	265	267.7	268.7	270.06		
DUP	Christina McFaul	5.22%	125	125				
Electorate: 4,142 Valid: 2,395 (57.82%) Spoilt: 44 Quota: 400 Turnout: 2,439 (58.88%)

=== Giant's Causeway ===
2001: 2 x DUP, 2 x UUP, 1 x Independent
2005: 2 x DUP, 2 x UUP, 1 x Independent
2001-2005 Change: No change

Giant's Causeway - 5 seats
Party	Candidate	FPv%	Count	
Party	Candidate	FPv%	1	2
DUP	David McAllister*	28.39%	481	
DUP	George Hartin*	27.74%	470	
UUP	William Graham*	19.24%	326	
UUP	Robert McIlroy*	10.15%	172	295.54
Independent	Price McConaghy*	13.11%	222	281.74
Independent	Thomas Palmer	1.36%	23	37.5
Electorate: 3,015 Valid: 1,694 (56.19%) Spoilt: 49 Quota: 283 Turnout: 1,743 (57.81%)

=== The Glens ===
2001: 2 x SDLP, 2 x Independent, 1 x Sinn Féin
2005: 2 x Sinn Féin, 2 x SDLP, 1 x Independent
2001-2005 Change: Independent joins Sinn Féin

The Glens - 5 seats
Party	Candidate	FPv%	Count		
Party	Candidate	FPv%	1	2	3
Sinn Féin	Oliver McMullan*	26.43%	682		
SDLP	Orla Black	16.94%	437		
Sinn Féin	Marie McKeegan	12.21%	315	441.17	
Independent	Randal McDonnell*	15.62%	403	432.23	
SDLP	Catherine McCambridge*	12.44%	321	342.46	405.83
Sinn Féin	Maria O'Hara	8.57%	221	289.82	290.82
DUP	Walter Greer	7.79%	201	201.37	
Electorate: 4,069 Valid: 2,580 (63.41%) Spoilt: 43 Quota: 431 Turnout: 2,623 (64.46%)
