= 1993 Moyle District Council election =

Local government election in Northern Ireland

← 1989	19 May 1993	1997 →

All 15 seats to Moyle District Council 8 seats needed for a majority
	First party	Second party	Third party
Party	SDLP	DUP	UUP
Seats won	3	3	2
Seat change	▼1	0	0
	Fourth party	Fifth party	Sixth party
Party	Independent	Ind. Unionist	Ind. Republican
Seats won	2	2	1
Seat change	0	0	▲1
	Seventh party	Eighth party
Party	Ind. Nationalist	Sinn Féin
Seats won	1	1
Seat change	0	0
- Party with the most votes by district.

Elections to Moyle District Council were held on 19 May 1993 on the same day as the other Northern Irish local government elections. The election used three district electoral areas to elect a total of 15 councillors.

== Election results ==
Moyle District Council Election Result 1993
Party	Seats	Gains	Losses	Net gain/loss	Seats %	Votes %	Votes	+/−
SDLP	3	0	1	▼1	20.0	25.8	1,695	▼3.8
DUP	3	0	0	0	20.0	18.4	1,211	▼0.9
UUP	2	0	0	0	13.3	7.5	494	▼1.3
Ind. Unionist	2	0	0	0	13.3	13.7	901	▼1.8
Independent	2	0	0	0	13.3	12.1	798	▼2.6
Sinn Féin	1	0	0	0	6.7	8.3	548	▲2.7
Ind. Republican	1	1	0	▲1	6.7	8.2	538	▲8.2
Ind. Nationalist	1	0	0	0	6.7	5.2	340	▲0.2

Note: "Votes" are the first preference votes.

== Districts summary ==
Results of the Moyle District Council election, 1993 by district
Ward	%	Cllrs	%	Cllrs	%	Cllrs	%	Cllrs	%	Cllrs	Total Cllrs
Ward	SDLP		DUP		UUP		Sinn Féin		Others		Total Cllrs
Ballycastle	26.2	1	22.6	1	8.9	1	6.8	0	35.5	2	5
Giant's Causeway	0.0	0	28.0	2	19.8	1	0.0	0	52.2	2	5
The Glens	42.7	2	8.4	0	0.0	0	15.2	1	33.7	2	5
Total	25.8	3	18.4	3	7.5	2	8.3	1	40.0	6	15

== District results ==
=== Ballycastle ===
1989: 2 x Independent, 1 x SDLP, 1 x DUP, 1 x UUP
1993: 2 x Independent, 1 x SDLP, 1 x DUP, 1 x UUP
1989-1993 Change: No change

Ballycastle - 5 seats
Party	Candidate	FPv%	Count						
Party	Candidate	FPv%	1	2	3	4	5	6	7
DUP	Gardiner Kane*	22.61%	499						
Independent	Christopher McCaughan	17.26%	381						
SDLP	Richard Kerr	14.18%	313	313.28	314.56	316.24	328.09	394.09	
Independent	Seamus Blaney	13.41%	296	296.56	297.56	300.56	333.11	355.69	460.69
UUP	Helen Harding	8.88%	196	310.52	317.48	318.38	337	338.06	338.09
SDLP	Anna Edwards	6.80%	150	151.12	153.12	154.32	161.56	180.89	202.92
Sinn Féin	Paul Little	6.84%	151	151.28	151.28	151.43	152.46	153.46	
SDLP	Michael O'Cleary*	5.26%	116	116.28	116.28	117.18	133.69		
Independent	Archibald McAuley*	4.26%	94	102.68	106.08	108.63			
Independent	Elizabeth McConaghy	0.50%	11	16.04					
Electorate: 3,621 Valid: 2,207 (60.95%) Spoilt: 41 Quota: 368 Turnout: 2,248 (62.08%)

=== Giant's Causeway ===
1989: 2 x Independent Unionist, 2 x DUP, 1 x UUP
1993: 2 x Independent Unionist, 2 x DUP, 1 x UUP
1989-1993 Change: No change

Giant's Causeway - 5 seats
Party	Candidate	FPv%	Count				
Party	Candidate	FPv%	1	2	3	4	5
Ind. Unionist	Price McConaghy*	26.48%	465				
Ind. Unionist	Robert McIlroy*	18.28%	321				
DUP	Thomas Brennan	14.46%	254	264.66	293.66		
DUP	David McAllister	13.55%	238	267.93	281.93	288.95	299.95
UUP	Robert Getty*	10.25%	180	216.08	221.72	227.48	298.48
Ind. Unionist	James Rodgers*	6.55%	115	161.74	173.48	182.48	208.48
UUP	Robert Thompson	6.72%	118	149.98	158.26	162.31	
Ind. Unionist	Ronnie McIlvar	2.79%	49	60.07			
Independent	Thomas Palmer	0.91%	16	20.1			
Electorate: 3,143 Valid: 1,756 (55.87%) Spoilt: 40 Quota: 293 Turnout: 1,796 (57.14%)

=== The Glens ===
1989: 3 x SDLP, 1 x Sinn Féin, 1 x Independent Nationalist
1993: 2 x SDLP, 1 x Sinn Féin, 1 x Independent Nationalist, 1 x Independent Republican
1989-1993 Change: Independent Republican gain from SDLP

The Glens - 5 seats
Party	Candidate	FPv%	Count			
Party	Candidate	FPv%	1	2	3	4
Ind. Republican	Oliver McMullan	20.61%	538			
SDLP	Malachy McSparran*	19.49%	509			
Ind. Nationalist	Randal McDonnell*	13.02%	340	380.11	413.41	452.41
Sinn Féin	James McCarry*	15.20%	397	429.34	433.09	433.51
SDLP	Patrick McBride*	13.75%	359	363.41	373.01	400.16
SDLP	Joseph Mitchell*	9.50%	248	270.47	294.62	294.83
DUP	Elizabeth Brennan	8.43%	220	221.26	221.41	
Electorate: 3,787 Valid: 2,611 (68.95%) Spoilt: 42 Quota: 436 Turnout: 2,653 (70.06%)
