= 1997 Moyle District Council election =

Local government election in Northern Ireland

| ← 1993 | 21 May 1997 | 2001 → |

All 15 seats to Moyle District Council 8 seats needed for a majority
| | First party | Second party | Third party |
|---|---|---|---|
| Party | SDLP | DUP | UUP |
| Seats won | 3 | 3 | 3 |
| Seat change | 0 | 0 | ▲1 |
| | Fourth party | Fifth party | Sixth party |
| Party | Independent | Sinn Féin | Ind. Republican |
| Seats won | 2 | 1 | 1 |
| Seat change | 0 | 0 | 0 |
| | Seventh party | Eighth party |
| Party | Ind. Nationalist | Ind. Unionist |
| Seats won | 1 | 1 |
| Seat change | 0 | ▼1 |
- Results by district electoral area, shaded by First Preference Votes.

Elections to Moyle District Council were held on 21 May 1997 on the same day as the other Northern Irish local government elections. The election used three district electoral areas to elect a total of 15 councillors.

== Election results ==
Moyle District Council Election Result 1997
| Party | Seats | Gains | Losses | Net gain/loss | Seats % | Votes % | Votes | +/− |
|---|---|---|---|---|---|---|---|---|
| SDLP | 3 | 0 | 0 | 0 | 20.0 | 22.5 | 1,365 | ▼3.3 |
| DUP | 3 | 0 | 0 | 0 | 20.0 | 19.7 | 1,196 | ▲1.3 |
| UUP | 3 | 1 | 0 | ▲1 | 20.0 | 14.0 | 848 | ▲6.5 |
| Independent | 2 | 0 | 0 | 0 | 13.3 | 13.1 | 794 | ▲1.0 |
| Ind. Republican | 1 | 0 | 0 | 0 | 6.7 | 11.7 | 711 | ▲3.5 |
| Ind. Unionist | 1 | 0 | 1 | ▼1 | 13.3 | 8.0 | 484 | ▼5.7 |
| Sinn Féin | 1 | 0 | 0 | 0 | 6.7 | 7.5 | 454 | ▼0.8 |
| Ind. Nationalist | 1 | 0 | 0 | 0 | 6.7 | 3.7 | 223 | ▼1.5 |

Note: "Votes" are the first preference votes.

== Districts summary ==
Results of the Moyle District Council election, 1997 by district
| Ward | % | Cllrs | % | Cllrs | % | Cllrs | % | Cllrs | % | Cllrs | Total Cllrs |
| Ward | SDLP | | DUP | | UUP | | Sinn Féin | | Others | | Total Cllrs |
|---|---|---|---|---|---|---|---|---|---|---|---|
| Ballycastle | 25.3 | 1 | 19.4 | 1 | 14.8 | 1 | 0.0 | 0 | 40.5 | 2 | 5 |
| Giant's Causeway | 0.0 | 0 | 36.2 | 2 | 33.7 | 2 | 0.0 | 0 | 30.1 | 1 | 5 |
| The Glens | 35.5 | 2 | 8.8 | 0 | 0.0 | 0 | 18.2 | 1 | 37.5 | 2 | 5 |
| Total | 22.5 | 3 | 19.7 | 3 | 14.0 | 3 | 7.5 | 1 | 36.3 | 5 | 15 |

== Districts results ==
=== Ballycastle ===
1993: 2 x Independent, 1 x SDLP, 1 x DUP, 1 x UUP
1997: 2 x Independent, 1 x SDLP, 1 x DUP, 1 x UUP
1993-1997 Change: No change

Ballycastle - 5 seats
| Party | Candidate | FPv% | Count | | |
| Party | Candidate | FPv% | 1 | 2 | 3 |
|---|---|---|---|---|---|
| Independent | Seamus Blaney* | 28.88% | 551 | | |
| SDLP | Richard Kerr* | 25.31% | 483 | | |
| DUP | Gardiner Kane* | 18.66% | 356 | | |
| Independent | Christopher McCaughan* | 11.58% | 221 | 418.88 | |
| UUP | Helen Harding* | 14.83% | 283 | 311.05 | 439.05 |
| DUP | Elizabeth Brennan | 0.73% | 14 | 16.04 | 25.04 |
Electorate: 3,770 Valid: 1,908 (50.61%) Spoilt: 36 Quota: 319 Turnout: 1,944 (51.56%)

=== Giant's Causeway ===
1993: 2 x Independent Unionist, 2 x DUP, 1 x UUP
1997: 2 x DUP, 2 x UUP, 1 x Independent Unionist
1993-1997 Change: Independent Unionist joins UUP

Giant's Causeway - 5 seats
| Party | Candidate | FPv% | Count | | | | | |
| Party | Candidate | FPv% | 1 | 2 | 3 | 4 | 5 | 6 |
|---|---|---|---|---|---|---|---|---|
| Ind. Unionist | Price McConaghy* | 28.83% | 484 | | | | | |
| UUP | William Graham | 15.66% | 263 | 308.54 | | | | |
| DUP | David McAllister* | 16.56% | 278 | 297.32 | | | | |
| DUP | George Hartin | 14.12% | 237 | 244.82 | 245.82 | 303.82 | | |
| UUP | Robert McIlroy* | 10.48% | 176 | 231.66 | 237.04 | 246.34 | 261.04 | 272.04 |
| UUP | Raymond Rodgers | 7.50% | 126 | 180.74 | 190.42 | 213.56 | 226.86 | 237.86 |
| DUP | Allan Mulholland | 5.54% | 93 | 101.74 | 105.66 | | | |
| Independent | Thomas Palmer | 1.31% | 22 | 31.2 | | | | |
Electorate: 3,189 Valid: 1,679 (52.65%) Spoilt: 58 Quota: 280 Turnout: 1,737 (54.47%)

=== The Glens ===
1993: 2 x SDLP, 1 x Sinn Féin, 1 x Independent Republican, 1 x Independent Nationalist
1997: 2 x SDLP, 1 x Sinn Féin, 1 x Independent Republican, 1 x Independent Nationalist
1993-1997 Change: No change

The Glens - 5 seats
| Party | Candidate | FPv% | Count | | | | |
| Party | Candidate | FPv% | 1 | 2 | 3 | 4 | 5 |
|---|---|---|---|---|---|---|---|
| Ind. Republican | Oliver McMullan* | 28.58% | 711 | | | | |
| Sinn Féin | James McCarry* | 18.25% | 454 | | | | |
| SDLP | Malachy McSparran* | 16.24% | 404 | 488.15 | | | |
| SDLP | Archie McIntosh | 10.22% | 316 | 392.05 | 419.05 | | |
| Ind. Nationalist | Randal McDonnell* | 8.96% | 223 | 331 | 364.3 | 383.22 | 464.22 |
| DUP | Thomas Brennan | 8.76% | 218 | 219.35 | 220.7 | 220.81 | 222.81 |
| SDLP | Anna Edwards | 6.51% | 162 | 182.25 | 188.1 | 205.15 | |
Electorate: 4,032 Valid: 2,488 (61.71%) Spoilt: 32 Quota: 415 Turnout: 2,520 (62.50%)
