= 2011 Northern Ireland local elections =

- 5 May 2011

All 582 council seats
- Turnout: 55.7%
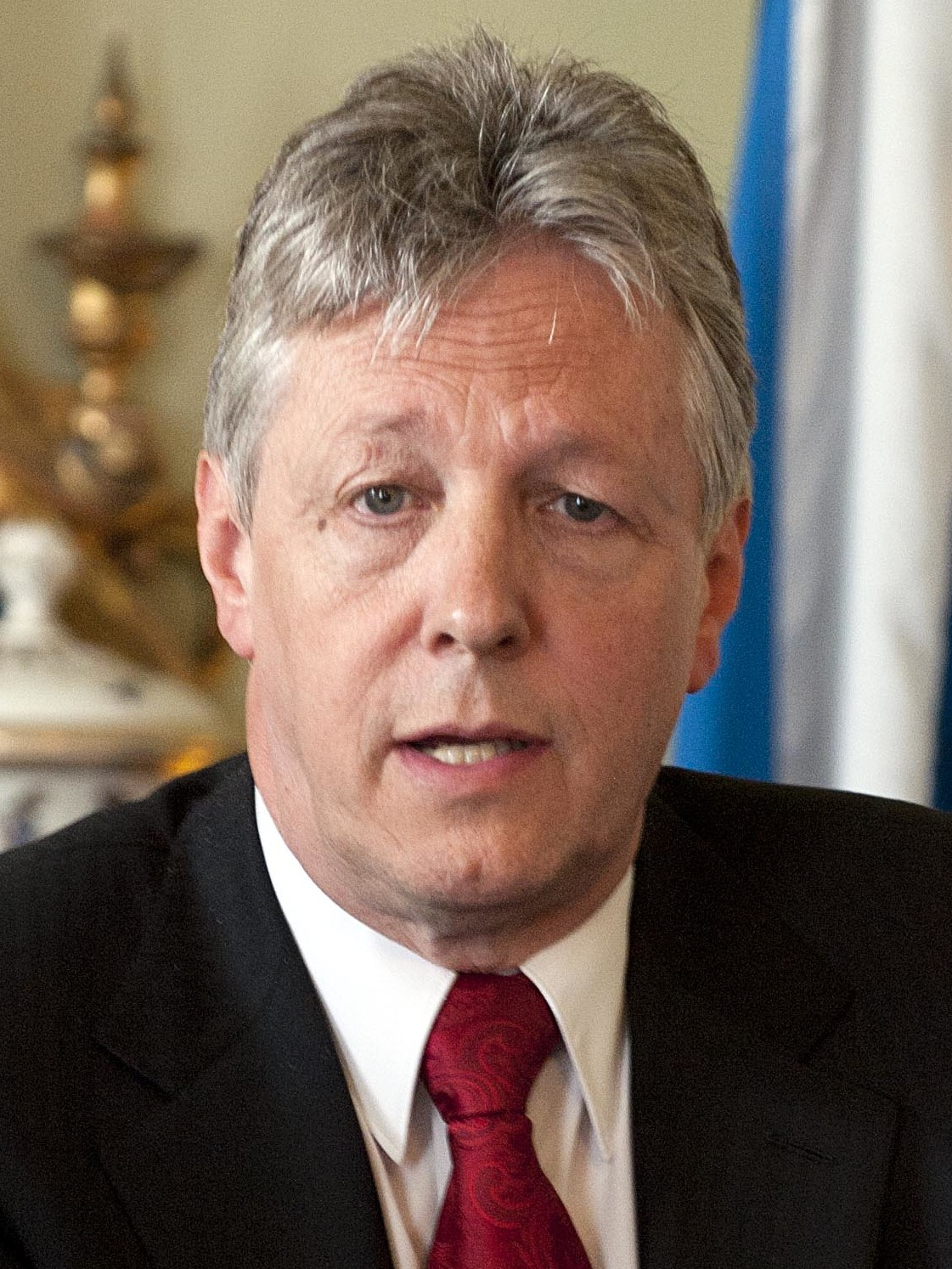

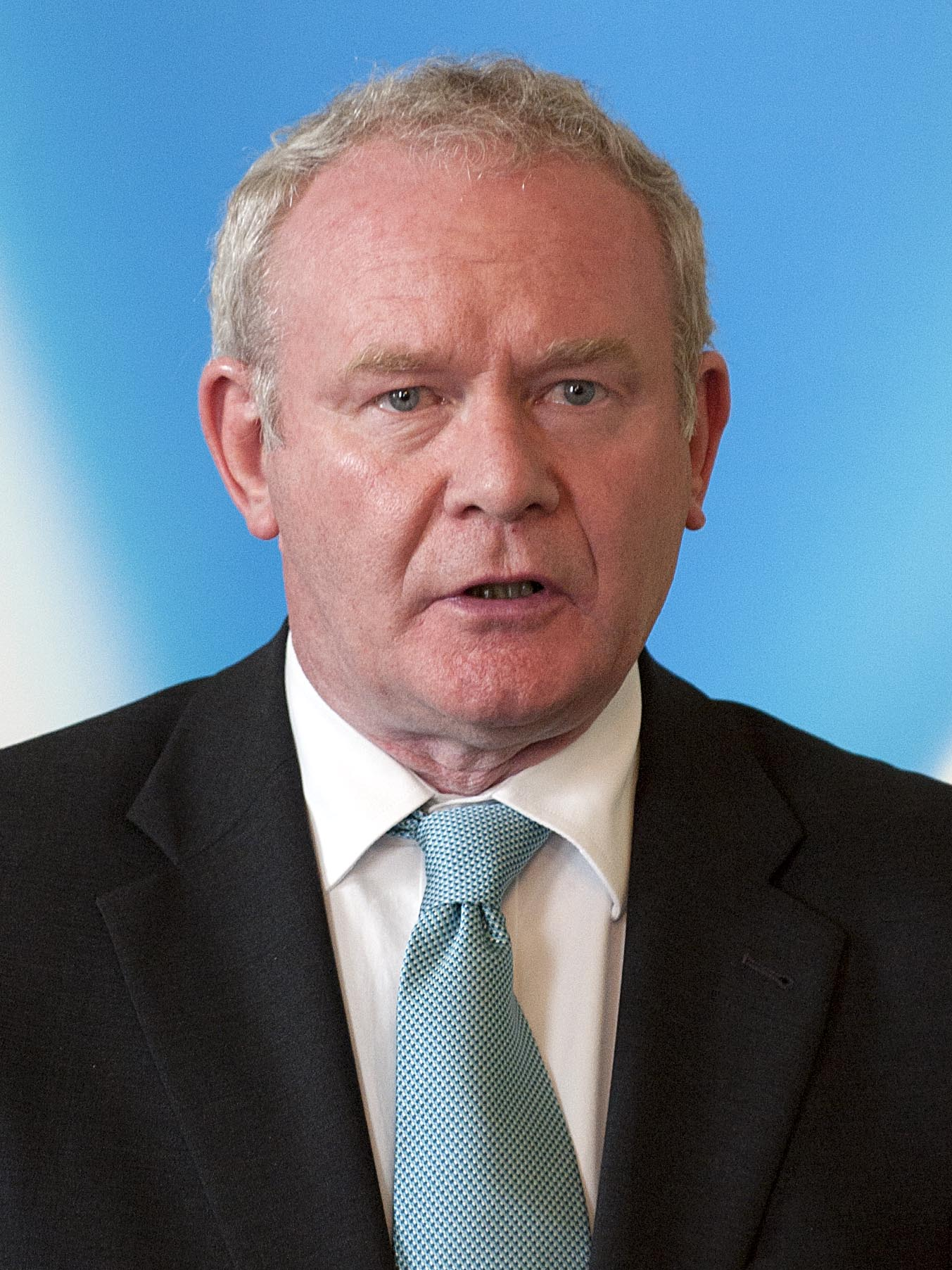

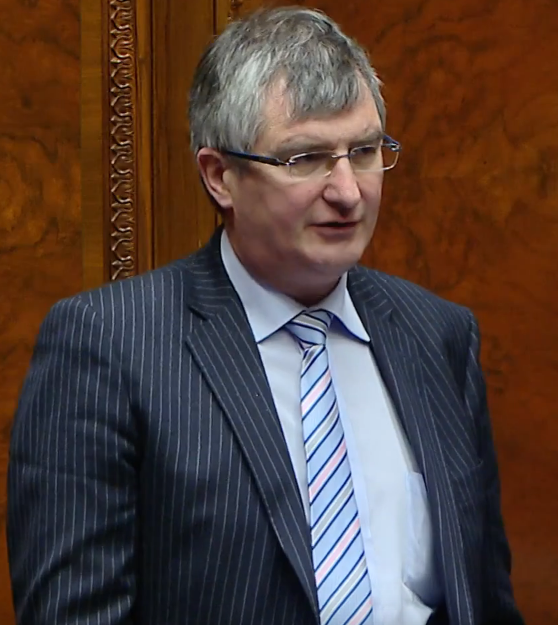

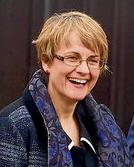

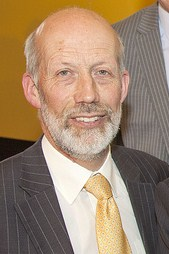

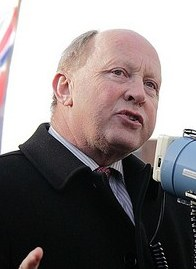
	First party	Second party	Third party
Leader	Peter Robinson	Martin McGuinness	Tom Elliott
Party	DUP	Sinn Féin	UUP
Seats won	175	138	99
Seat change	▼3	▲9	▼16
Popular vote	179,436	163,712	100,643
Percentage	27.2%	24.8%	15.2%
Swing	▼2.4%	▲1.6%	▼2.8%
	Fourth party	Fifth party	Sixth party
Leader	Margaret Ritchie	David Ford	Jim Allister
Party	SDLP	Alliance	TUV
Seats won	87	44	6
Seat change	▼14	▲14	▲6
Popular vote	99,325	48,859	13,079
Percentage	15.0%	7.4%	2.0%
Swing	▼2.4%	▲2.4%	New party
- Colours denote the party with the most seats

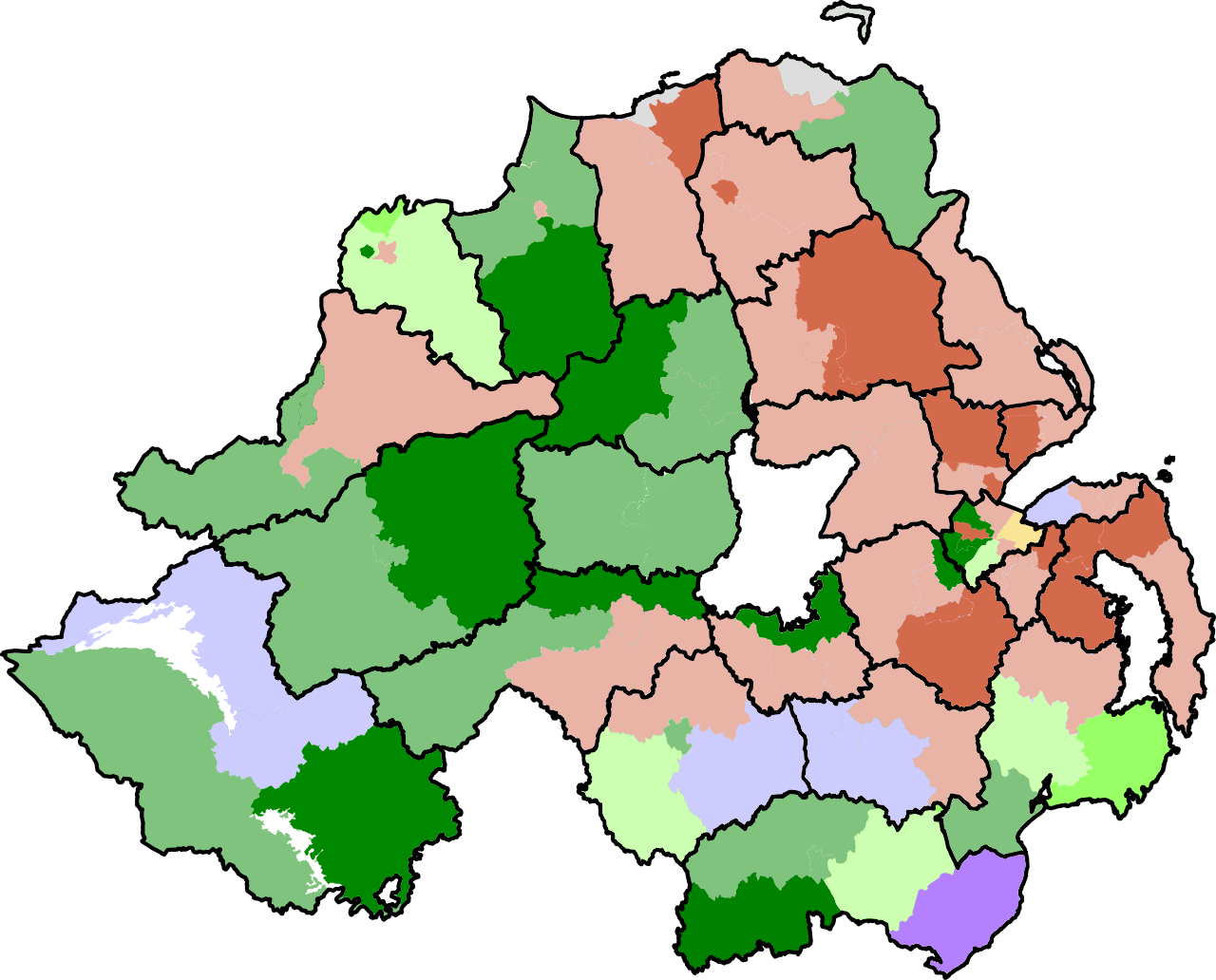
- Colours denote the party with a plurality of first preference votes in each District Electoral Area (darker colours indicate the party has a majority of first preference votes)

Elections for local government were held in Northern Ireland on Thursday 5 May 2011, contesting 582 seats in all.

European Union and Commonwealth citizens aged 18 or over on election day were entitled to vote. The deadline for voters to register to vote in the elections was midnight on Thursday 14 April 2011. A total of 1,210,009 were eligible to vote, and 55.7% of the electorate turned out.

All voters were required to present one piece of photographic ID in order to cast a vote at the polling station – accepted forms of ID are an electoral identity card, a photographic NI or GB driving licence, a European Union member-state passport, a Translink 60+ SmartPass, a Translink Senior SmartPass, a Translink Blind Person's SmartPass or a Translink War Disabled SmartPass. Voters who didn't have an accepted type of photographic ID had until Friday 22 April 2011 to apply for an electoral identity card from the Electoral Office.

The elections were originally scheduled to take place in 2009. In 2008, Minister of the Environment Arlene Foster requested that they be postponed until 2011 to allow the implementation of a proposed reform of local government in Northern Ireland, which would have reduced the number of local councils from 26 to 11. In February 2009, an order was made, postponing the election, and councillors' terms of office were extended until the fourth day after the election day in 2011.

In June 2010, the proposed reforms were abandoned, and it was confirmed that the 2011 elections would be to the existing 26 councils. There was also an election to the Northern Ireland Assembly and a referendum on voting reform on the same day. The reforms have since been adopted and the 2014 Northern Ireland local elections were for the 11 new districts.

== Results ==
Party	Councillors		Votes	
Party	Change	Total	% share	Total
DUP	-3	175	27.2	179,436
Sinn Féin	+9	138	24.8	163,712
UUP	-16	99	15.2	100,643
SDLP	-14	87	15.0	99,325
Alliance	+14	44	7.4	48,859
Independent	+6	27	5.1	32,023
TUV	+6	6	2.0	13,079
Green (NI)	0	3	1.0	6,317
PUP	0	2	0.6	3,858
UKIP	+1	1	0.4	2,550
Irish Republican Socialist	0	0	0.3	2,133
Éirígí	0	0	0.3	2,062
People Before Profit	0	0	0.3	1,721
NI Conservatives	0	0	0.2	1,321
Independent Republican Party	0	0	0.1	850
Community Partnership	0	0	0.1	800
Workers' Party	0	0	0.1	760
Socialist Party	0	0	0.1	682
BNP	0	0	0.1	491
Procapitalism	0	0	0.0	9

=== By council ===
Council	Council Seats by Party									
Council										Total
Council	TUV	DUP	UUP	Alliance	SDLP	SF	Green	Ind.	Others	Total
Antrim	–	5	5	2	3	4	–	–	–	19
Ards	–	11	6	4	1	–	–	1	–	23
Armagh	–	4	6	–	5	6	–	1	–	22
Ballymena	2	12	4	1	2	2	–	1	–	24
Ballymoney	1	8	2	–	1	3	–	1	–	16
Banbridge	–	5	7	1	2	2	–	–	–	17
Belfast	–	15	3	6	8	16	–	1	2 PUP	51
Carrickfergus	–	8	4	3	–	–	–	2	–	17
Castlereagh	–	11	3	6	2	–	1	–	–	23
Coleraine	–	9	5	2	3	1	–	2	–	22
Cookstown	–	3	3	–	4	6	–	–	–	16
Craigavon	–	9	6	1	2	8	–	–	–	26
Derry	–	5	1	–	14	10	–	–	–	30
Down	–	3	3	1	9	5	1	1	–	23
Dungannon	–	6	4	–	3	8	–	1	–	22
Fermanagh	–	4	6	–	3	9	–	1	–	23
Larne	1	4	3	3	1	1	–	2	–	15
Limavady	1	3	2	–	3	6	–	–	–	15
Lisburn	–	14	5	3	3	5	–	–	–	30
Magherafelt	–	3	2	–	2	9	–	–	–	16
Moyle	1	2	3	–	2	3	–	4	–	15
Newry and Mourne	–	1	3	–	9	14	–	2	1 UKIP	30
Newtownabbey	–	12	5	5	1	2	–	–	–	25
North Down	–	11	3	7	–	–	1	3	–	25
Omagh	–	3	3	–	3	10	–	2	–	21
Strabane	–	4	1	–	1	8	–	2	–	16
Total	6	175	99	44	87	138	3	27	3	582
Change	+6	-7	-16	+14	-14	+12	–	+7	-2	-2 UU -1 NR +1 UKIP
Elected 2005	–	182	115	30	101	126	3	20	5	2 PUP; 2 UU; 1 NR

== Councils ==
=== Antrim ===
Election results, shaded by plurality of First Preference Votes

Antrim North West
Party	Candidate	1st Pref
DUP	Trevor Clarke	1,172
Sinn Féin	Anthony Brady	738
Sinn Féin	Henry Cushinan	670
SDLP	Robert Loughran	634
SDLP	Brian Duffin	563
UUP	Roderick Swann	506
DUP	Wilson Clyde	329
Alliance	Pauline Savage	248
Turnout		4,942
No change

Antrim South East
Party	Candidate	1st Pref
SDLP	Thomas Burns	992
Sinn Féin	Annemarie Logue	885
DUP	Samuel Dunlop	873
UUP	Mervyn Rea	853
Alliance	Alan Lawther	817
DUP	Roy Thompson	771
UUP	Paul Michael	679
DUP	John Smyth	381
TUV	Mel Lucas	363
SDLP	Roisin Nugent	247
Independent	Martin Nelson	154
Independent	Gerard Fox	49
Turnout		7,165
No change

Antrim Town
Party	Candidate	1st Pref
UUP	Adrian Cochrane-Watson	884
DUP	Pam Lewis	734
Sinn Féin	Noel Maguire	638
DUP	Brian Graham	511
Alliance	Neil Kelly	501
DUP	John Smyth	439
UUP	Drew Ritchie	400
SDLP	Grainne Teggart	370
Alliance	Oran Keenan	353
Independent	Donovan McClelland	118
PUP	Kenneth Wilkinson	109
UUP	Amanda Johnston	69
Turnout		5,228
Sinn Féin gain from DUP		

=== Ards ===
Election results, shaded by plurality of First Preference Votes

Ards East
Party	Candidate	1st Pref
DUP	Colville Elliott	1,353
Alliance	Linda Cleland	1,094
DUP	Tom Smith	962
DUP	Hamilton Gregory	952
UUP	Ronnie Ferguson	623
DUP	Eddie Thompson	620
UUP	Katherine Ferguson	525
TUV	Terry Williams	304
Green (NI)	Emer Hopkins	191
SDLP	Moira Ritchie	123
Turnout		6,912
Alliance gain from UUP		

Ards Peninsula
Party	Candidate	1st Pref
SDLP	Joe Boyle	1,473
DUP	Robert Adair	1,067
Alliance	Kieran McCarthy	942
DUP	Colin Kennedy	726
UUP	Angus Carson	719
DUP	John Prentice	420
Alliance	Kellie Armstrong	288
Independent	Joe Hagan	261
Independent	Robin Drysdale	180
Turnout		6,313
No change

Ards West
Party	Candidate	1st Pref
DUP	Robert Gibson	1,519
DUP	Trevor Cummings	1,061
UUP	Jim Fletcher	881
DUP	Mervyn Oswald	868
Alliance	Deborah Girvan	763
Alliance	James McBriar	542
UUP	Philip Smith	471
TUV	Jack Allister	343
NI Conservatives	Bill McKendry	129
Turnout		6,692
Robert Gibson leaves UUP		
No change

Newtownards
Party	Candidate	1st Pref
DUP	Naomi Armstrong	979
Alliance	Alan McDowell	883
DUP	Stephen McIlveen	787
Independent	Jimmy Menagh	764
UUP	David Smyth	563
UUP	Tom Hamilton	555
DUP	Charlie Simmons	418
TUV	Hammy Lawther	183
Independent	Ken Richardson	123
SDLP	Gerard Lennon	89
Turnout		5,467
Independent gain from DUP		

=== Armagh ===
Election results, shaded by plurality of First Preference Votes

Armagh City
Party	Candidate	1st Pref
Sinn Féin	Cathy Rafferty	1,001
UUP	Sylvia McRoberts	902
Sinn Féin	Noel Sheridan	865
SDLP	Mealla Campbell	700
DUP	Freda Donnelly	698
SDLP	Pat Brannigan	652
Sinn Féin	Roy McCartney	559
Turnout		5,504
Sinn Féin gain from SDLP		

Crossmore
Party	Candidate	1st Pref
SDLP	Thomas O'Hanlon	1,620
Sinn Féin	Mary Doyle	1,160
Sinn Féin	Darren McNally	868
UUP	Mavis Eagle	844
DUP	Noel Donnelly	744
SDLP	Gerald Mallon	645
Turnout		6,010
UUP gain from DUP		

Cusher
Party	Candidate	1st Pref
UUP	Gordon Kennedy	1,785
Independent	Paul Berry	1,136
UUP	Robert Turner	944
SDLP	Sharon Haughey	823
DUP	Terry McWilliams	803
DUP	Gareth Wilson	595
Sinn Féin	Liam Lappin	591
UUP	John Moore	566
DUP	Philip Murdock	501
Turnout		7,890
Paul Berry leaves DUP		

The Orchard
Party	Candidate	1st Pref
DUP	William Irwin	1,520
Sinn Féin	Gerard White	1,215
UUP	Jim Speers	1,207
SDLP	John Campbell	939
UUP	Joy Rollston	724
DUP	Philip Weir	465
TUV	Paul Coleman	144
Turnout		6,293
No change

=== Ballymena ===
Election results, shaded by plurality of First Preference Votes

Ballymena North
Party	Candidate	1st Pref
Independent	James Henry	1,026
DUP	John Carson	941
DUP	Maurice Mills	746
SDLP	Patrick McAvoy	596
DUP	Audrey Wales	451
UUP	James McClean	436
UUP	Neil Armstrong	416
Alliance	Jayne Dunlop	416
TUV	James Alexander	389
Sinn Féin	Sean Davey	356
TUV	David Lynn	218
Turnout		6,109
Alliance gain from UUP		

Ballymena South
Party	Candidate	1st Pref
DUP	Beth Adger	746
SDLP	Declan O'Loan	616
DUP	Hubert Nicholl	544
DUP	Martin Clarke	511
DUP	Desmond Robinson	494
UUP	James Currie	419
TUV	Davy Tweed	400
UUP	Robin Swann	322
TUV	Jeremy Saulters	296
Sinn Féin	Thomas O'Hara	286
DUP	Gayle Nelson	253
Independent	Deirdre Nelson	93
Turnout		5,119
Davy Tweed leaves DUP		

Bannside
Party	Candidate	1st Pref
DUP	Tommy Nicholl	1,192
UUP	William McNeilly	1,036
TUV	Roy Gillespie	1,031
DUP	Billy Henry	1,016
DUP	Philip Moffatt	788
Sinn Féin	Monica Digney	787
TUV	Timothy Gaston	465
SDLP	Eugene Reid	439
Turnout		6,872
Roy Gillespie leaves DUP		

Braid
Party	Candidate	1st Pref
DUP	Paul Frew	1,511
DUP	Beth Clyde	922
DUP	Sam Hanna	884
UUP	Robin Cherry	692
UUP	Lexie Scott	622
Sinn Féin	Paul Maguire	574
TUV	Sam Gaston	460
SDLP	Cahal Kerr	409
Independent	Catherine O'Hara	246
Turnout		6,410
Sinn Féin gain from SDLP		

=== Ballymoney ===
Election results, shaded by plurality of First Preference Votes

Ballymoney Town
Party	Candidate	1st Pref
DUP	Mervyn Storey	1,090
Independent	Iain McAfee	347
SDLP	Daniel Hendrie	306
UUP	Thomas McKeown	276
DUP	Cecil Cousley	271
DUP	Ian Stevenson	238
TUV	Billy Kerr	228
UUP	James Simpson	186
DUP	Brian Kelly	148
Turnout		4,149
Independent gain from UUP		

Bann Valley
Party	Candidate	1st Pref
DUP	John Finlay	905
Sinn Féin	Philip McGuigan	876
DUP	Jason Atkinson	591
DUP	Robert Halliday	573
Sinn Féin	Cathal McLaughlin	443
TUV	William Blair	440
SDLP	Malachy McCamphill	373
Sinn Féin	Leanne Peacock	345
UUP	Steven Phillips	345
Turnout		5,104
TUV gain from SDLP		

Bushvale
Party	Candidate	1st Pref
DUP	Evelyne Robinson	767
DUP	Frank Campbell	599
UUP	Bill Kennedy	532
Sinn Féin	Anita Cavlan	504
SDLP	Harry Connolly	454
UUP	William Johnston	224
TUV	Peter Deans	202
Sinn Féin	Jimmy Gaston	176
Turnout		3,508
Bill Kennedy joins UUP		

=== Banbridge ===
Election results, shaded by plurality of First Preference Votes

Banbridge Town
Party	Candidate	1st Pref
UUP	Joan Baird	1,466
DUP	Junior McCrum	1,038
UUP	Ian Burns	676
Alliance	Sheila McQuaid	483
DUP	Jim McElroy	473
Sinn Féin	Vincent McAleenan	435
SDLP	Marie Hamilton	367
Independent	Dessie Ward	335
SDLP	Cassie McDermott	316
DUP	John McKinstry	308
Turnout		6,021
No change

Dromore
Party	Candidate	1st Pref
DUP	Paul Rankin	967
DUP	Hazel Gamble	943
UUP	Carol Black	820
UUP	Olive Mercer	707
DUP	Norah Beare	685
Sinn Féin	Paul Gribben	597
SDLP	Louis Boyle	488
Alliance	Francis Branniff	409
TUV	Lyle Rea	249
Turnout		5,924
UUP gain from DUP		
Sinn Féin gain from SDLP		

Knockiveagh
Party	Candidate	1st Pref
SDLP	Seamus Doyle	1,238
UUP	Elizabeth Ingram	1,135
Sinn Féin	Brendan Curran	1,039
DUP	David Herron	869
UUP	John Hanna	691
UUP	Glenn Barr	672
DUP	Ian Wilson	621
TUV	Stephen Herron	209
Turnout		6,579
UUP gain from DUP		

=== Belfast ===
Election results, shaded by plurality of First Preference Votes

Balmoral
Party	Candidate	1st Pref
Alliance	Tom Ekin	1,762
DUP	Ruth Patterson	1,553
Sinn Féin	Máirtín Ó Muilleoir	1,465
SDLP	Claire Hanna	1,443
UUP	Bob Stoker	922
SDLP	Niall Kelly	743
SDLP	Bernie Kelly	706
UUP	Jim Kirkpatrick	578
DUP	Sharon Simpson	396
Green (NI)	Mark Simpson	282
People Before Profit	Andrew King	107
Turnout		9,957
Sinn Féin gain from DUP		

Castle
Party	Candidate	1st Pref
DUP	Lydia Patterson	1,489
Sinn Féin	Tierna Cunningham	1,377
SDLP	Pat Convery	1,367
Sinn Féin	Mary Campbell	1,293
UUP	David Browne	1,181
DUP	Guy Spence	946
SDLP	Cathal Mullaghan	883
Alliance	David McKechnie	689
DUP	Lee Reynolds	629
Workers' Party	John Lavery	170
Turnout		10,024
Sinn Féin gain from SDLP		

Court
Party	Candidate	1st Pref
DUP	William Humphrey	2,643
DUP	Brian Kingston	1,371
Independent	Frank McCoubrey	754
PUP	Hugh Smyth	640
UUP	Bobby McConnell	395
DUP	Naomi Thompson	237
Independent	Raymond McCord	199
Sinn Féin	Karol McKee	184
SDLP	Conor McNeill	99
Alliance	Mark Long	78
Turnout		6,600
No change		

Laganbank
Party	Candidate	1st Pref
Alliance	Catherine Curran	1,518
Sinn Féin	Deirdre Hargey	1,383
SDLP	Patrick McCarthy	1,361
DUP	Christopher Stalford	1,126
UUP	Michelle Bostock	921
SDLP	Kate Mullan	833
Green (NI)	Claire Bailey	500
People Before Profit	Mark Hewitt	144
Socialist Party	Paddy Meehan	136
Workers' Party	Patrick Lynn	88
Turnout		8,010
Alliance gain from UUP		

Lower Falls
Party	Candidate	1st Pref
Sinn Féin	Janice Austin	1,920
Sinn Féin	Steven Corr	1,572
Sinn Féin	Tom Hartley	1,561
Sinn Féin	Jim McVeigh	1,497
SDLP	Colin Keenan	1,000
Sinn Féin	Breige Brownlee	813
Éirígí	John McCusker	647
Workers' Party	John Lowry	398
Irish Republican Socialist	Jim Gorman	209
Socialist Party	Pat Lawlor	148
Turnout		9,765
SDLP gain from Sinn Féin		

Oldpark
Party	Candidate	1st Pref
DUP	Ian Crozier	1,770
Sinn Féin	Conor Maskey	1,573
Sinn Féin	Gerard McCabe	1,492
Sinn Féin	Daniel Lavery	1,370
SDLP	Nichola Mallon	1,184
Sinn Féin	Mary Clarke	1,180
DUP	Gareth McKee	917
UUP	Fred Rodgers	540
Irish Republican Socialist	Paul Little	379
Alliance	James McClure	303
Independent	Martin McAuley	146
Turnout		10,584
DUP gain from UUP		

Pottinger
Party	Candidate	1st Pref
Alliance	Máire Hendron	1,895
DUP	Gavin Robinson	1,523
Sinn Féin	Niall Ó Donnghaile	1,077
DUP	May Campbell	1,051
PUP	John Kyle	1,022
DUP	Adam Newton	936
UUP	Philip Robinson	786
SDLP	Séamas de Faoite	456
Green (NI)	David Newman	223
TUV	John Hiddleston	191
Socialist Party	Thomas Black	150
Workers' Party	Kevin McNally	104
People Before Profit	Donna McCusker	70
Independent	Karl Hedley	33
Procapitalism	Samuel Smyth	9
Turnout		9,526
Sinn Féin gain from UUP		

Upper Falls
Party	Candidate	1st Pref
Sinn Féin	Matt Garrett	2,250
Sinn Féin	Gerard O'Neill	2,184
Sinn Féin	Emma Groves	2,133
SDLP	Tim Attwood	2,015
Sinn Féin	Caoimhin Mac Giolla Mhín	1,910
Éirígí	Pádraic Mac Coitir	1,415
SDLP	Helen Walsh	250
DUP	Eileen Kingston	179
Alliance	Dan McGuinness	162
Turnout		12,498
No change		

Victoria
Party	Candidate	1st Pref
DUP	Robin Newton	2,338
Alliance	Mervyn Jones	2,319
Alliance	Laura McNamee	1,677
DUP	Tom Haire	1,437
UUP	Jim Rodgers	1,355
Alliance	Andrew Webb	1,137
UUP	Ian Adamson	942
PUP	Robert McCartney	908
DUP	John Hussey	812
Green (NI)	Ross Campbell	315
UUP	Stephen Warke	216
SDLP	Magdalena Wolska	207
TUV	Sammy Morrison	158
Independent	Roy Hobson	142
NI Conservatives	Garry Crosbie	103
Turnout		14,066
Alliance gain from UUP		

=== Carrickfergus ===
Election results, shaded by plurality of First Preference Votes

Carrick Castle
Party	Candidate	1st Pref
Alliance	Sean Neeson	651
DUP	David Hilditch	507
Independent	William Hamilton	366
DUP	Deborah Emerson	260
UUP	Elizabeth McKnight	243
DUP	Patricia McKinney	186
Independent	Nicholas Wady	125
Alliance	Noel Williams	124
Turnout		2,513
No change

Kilroot
Party	Candidate	1st Pref
Independent	Jim Brown	1,179
DUP	Billy Ashe	1,173
Alliance	Isobel Day	691
DUP	Terence Clements	515
Alliance	Robert Logan	493
DUP	Lynn McClurg	391
UUP	Eric Ferguson	359
UUP	Cathy Vizard	348
Green (NI)	Mark Bailey	169
Turnout		5,396
No change

Knockagh Monument
Party	Candidate	1st Pref
DUP	May Beattie	1,085
Alliance	Stewart Dickson	835
UUP	Andrew Wilson	568
DUP	James McClurg	560
UUP	John Stewart	454
DUP	Charie Johnston	431
Alliance	Shireen Bell	316
DUP	Louise Marsden	248
Green (NI)	Brian Luney	125
Turnout		4,703
No change

=== Castlereagh ===
Election results, shaded by plurality of First Preference Votes

Castlereagh Central
Party	Candidate	1st Pref
Alliance	Michael Long	919
DUP	Vivienne McCoy	720
UUP	Michael Copeland	654
DUP	Tommy Sandford	634
Alliance	Carole Howard	539
DUP	Denny Vitty	438
PUP	Jason Burke	323
DUP	Sharon Skillen	308
SDLP	Rosaleen Hughes	287
TUV	Alan Carson	245
Turnout		5,171
Alliance gain from DUP		

Castlereagh East
Party	Candidate	1st Pref
DUP	Gareth Robinson	1,804
Alliance	Judith Cochrane	1,309
DUP	Tommy Jeffers	760
Alliance	Tim Morrow	650
DUP	David Drysdale	649
Green (NI)	Martin Gregg	574
DUP	Aileen Graham	510
DUP	Jim White	441
UUP	Hazel Legge	417
BNP	Ann Cooper	205
NI Conservatives	Terry Dick	120
Turnout		7,557
David Drysdale leaves UUP		
Alliance gain from DUP		
Green gain from UUP		

Castlereagh South
Party	Candidate	1st Pref
DUP	Jimmy Spratt	1,535
Alliance	Geraldine Rice	1,269
SDLP	Brian Hanvey	948
DUP	John Beattie	823
UUP	Michael Henderson	591
SDLP	Sean Mullan	510
Sinn Féin	James Irwin	459
UUP	Barbara McBurney	185
Green (NI)	Rebecca Volley	142
Turnout		6,552
No change

Castlereagh West
Party	Candidate	1st Pref
Alliance	Sara Duncan	1,456
DUP	Ann-Marie Beattie	1,138
SDLP	Peter O'Reilly	936
DUP	Myreve Chambers	630
UUP	Cecil Hall	601
Sinn Féin	Laura Keenan	276
UUP	Bill White	269
People Before Profit	Gordon Hewitt	93
Turnout		5,499
No change

=== Coleraine ===
Election results, shaded by plurality of First Preference Votes

Bann
Party	Candidate	1st Pref
DUP	Adrian McQuillan	1,440
Sinn Féin	Ciaran Archibald	1,076
UUP	William King	938
DUP	Sam Cole	623
SDLP	Roisin Loftus	582
SDLP	Eamon Mullan	419
UUP	Rosemary Torrens	366
UUP	Richard Holmes	363
Alliance	Charlie McConaghy	266
TUV	Elizabeth Collins	239
DUP	Angela Torrens	223
Turnout		6,645
No change

Coleraine Central
Party	Candidate	1st Pref
Independent	David McClarty	1,260
DUP	George Duddy	715
DUP	James McClure	582
UUP	David Barbour	557
DUP	William McCandless	525
Alliance	Graham Scobie	472
Sinn Féin	Susan Kelly	408
SDLP	Gerald McLaughlin	404
UUP	Nigel Macauley	353
Independent	Russell Watton	342
SDLP	Sebastian Pierzchalski	87
Turnout		5,813
David McClarty leaves UUP		
DUP gain from UUP		

Coleraine East
Party	Candidate	1st Pref
DUP	Maurice Bradley	1,507
UUP	David Harding	517
DUP	William Creelman	376
Alliance	Yvonne Boyle	350
UUP	Robert McPherson	275
SDLP	Teresa Young	232
DUP	Phyllis Fielding	167
Turnout		5,319
Alliance gain from UUP		

The Skerries
Party	Candidate	1st Pref
Alliance	Barney Fitzpatrick	635
Independent	Christine Alexander	590
DUP	Mark Fielding	562
UUP	Norman Hillis	415
SDLP	Maura Hickey	342
Independent	Noel Kennedy	334
Sinn Féin	Christopher O'Neill	275
DUP	Sandy Gilkinson	264
UUP	Lesley Macaulay	263
Independent	James Davies	116
UKIP	Adrian Parke	91
TUV	Michael Wiggins	85
Turnout		4,767
Alliance gain from DUP		

=== Cookstown ===
Election results, shaded by plurality of First Preference Votes

Ballinderry
Party	Candidate	1st Pref
Sinn Féin	Pearse McAleer	1,713
DUP	Samuel McCartney	1,246
Sinn Féin	Michael McIvor	820
UUP	Robert Kelly	779
SDLP	Deirdre Mayo	775
SDLP	Christine McFlynn	654
TUV	Walter Millar	461
Turnout		6,588
No change

Cookstown Central
Party	Candidate	1st Pref
Sinn Féin	John McNamee	986
UUP	Trevor Wilson	909
DUP	Ian McCrea	738
SDLP	Tony Quinn	623
Sinn Féin	Ciarán McElhone	372
TUV	Hannah Loughrin	254
SDLP	Peter Cassidy	212
Alliance	Michael McDonald	92
Turnout		4,254
Sinn Féin gain from SDLP		

Drum Manor
Party	Candidate	1st Pref
Sinn Féin	Sean Clarke	970
UUP	Samuel Glasgow	962
DUP	Maureen Lees	850
Sinn Féin	Cathal Mallaghan	739
SDLP	James McGarvey	565
Sinn Féin	Oliver Molloy	535
TUV	Samuel Parke	444
Turnout		5,161
No change

=== Craigavon ===
Election results, shaded by plurality of First Preference Votes

Craigavon Central
Party	Candidate	1st Pref
Sinn Féin	Mark O'Dowd	1,434
DUP	Robert Smith	1,405
UUP	James Twyble	1,104
Sinn Féin	Tommy O'Connor	744
Independent	Kieran Corr	692
DUP	William Smith	688
UUP	Ronald Harkness	614
Alliance	Michael Dixon	586
UUP	Andrew Crockett	459
DUP	Louise Templeton	444
SDLP	Mary Elliott	278
TUV	Roy Ferguson	251
SDLP	Anna Ochal-Molenda	108
Turnout		9,084
Sinn Féin gain from SDLP		
Alliance gain from DUP		

Lurgan
Party	Candidate	1st Pref
DUP	Stephen Moutray	1,952
UUP	Jo-Anne Dobson	1,311
UUP	Meta Crozier	1,239
Sinn Féin	Liam Mackle	960
DUP	Carla Lockhart	952
UUP	George Savage	905
DUP	Mark Baxter	757
Alliance	John Cleland	551
SDLP	Francis McAlinden	529
TUV	David Calvert	508
UKIP	Barbara Trotter	122
Turnout		9,971
No change

Loughside
Party	Candidate	1st Pref
Sinn Féin	Johnny McGibbon	2,465
SDLP	Declan McAlinden	1,065
Sinn Féin	Mairéad O'Dowd	812
Sinn Féin	Noel McGeown	735
SDLP	Joe Nelson	671
SDLP	Caoimhe Dummigan	589
Sinn Féin	Maurice Magill	553
DUP	Philip Carson	497
Independent	Mal Nelson	225
Turnout		7,813
No change

Portadown
Party	Candidate	1st Pref
DUP	Sidney Anderson	2,029
UUP	George Hatch	883
Sinn Féin	Paul Duffy	808
Sinn Féin	Gemma McKenna	793
DUP	Gladys McCullough	665
SDLP	John McGoldrick	364
DUP	Alan Carson	348
UUP	Robert Oliver	330
SDLP	Mary McAlinden	258
DUP	Darren Causby	237
TUV	Karen Boal	217
SDLP	Daniel Gouveia	164
Turnout		7,270
DUP gain from Independent		
Sinn Féin gain from SDLP		

=== Derry ===
Election results, shaded by plurality of First Preference Votes

Cityside
Party	Candidate	1st Pref
SDLP	Jim Clifford	1,243
Sinn Féin	Kevin Campbell	1,199
Sinn Féin	Patricia Logue	937
Sinn Féin	Colin Kelly	631
Independent (32 County Sovereignty)	Gary Donnelly	612
Sinn Féin	Liam Friel	391
SDLP	Ann Donnelly	311
People Before Profit	Conor Kelly	265
SDLP	Dermott Henderson	214
Turnout		5,798
No change		

Northland
Party	Candidate	1st Pref
SDLP	John Tierney	1,736
Sinn Féin	Maeve McLaughlin	1,260
SDLP	John Boyle	1,099
Sinn Féin	Gerry MacLochlainn	936
SDLP	Sean Carr	824
Sinn Féin	Michael Cooper	783
SDLP	Eamon McAuley	429
SDLP	Fiona Hamilton	366
Alliance	Colm Cavanagh	217
Sinn Féin	Patrick McGinley	704
People Before Profit	Colm Bryce	564
Irish Republican Socialist	Lucy Callaghan	340
Turnout		
No change		

Rural
Party	Candidate	1st Pref
Sinn Féin	Paul Fleming	1,693
SDLP	Thomas Conway	1,616
DUP	Maurice Devenney	1,433
DUP	Gary Middleton	1,219
UUP	Ronald McKeegan	698
SDLP	Hugh Hastings	624
SDLP	Brenda Stevenson	615
People Before Profit	Diane Greer	256
Sinn Féin	Catherine Nelis	631
SDLP	Ashleen Schenning	423
Turnout		
No change		

Shantallow
Party	Candidate	1st Pref
SDLP	Colum Eastwood	2,109
Sinn Féin	Tony Hassan	1,405
SDLP	Shaun Gallagher	1,151
Sinn Féin	Elisha McLaughlin	1,117
Sinn Féin	Sandra Duffy	833
SDLP	James Carr	766
SDLP	Angela Dobbins	603
Irish Republican Socialist	Martin McGonagle	539
Independent	Pauline Mellon	477
Turnout		
No change		

Waterside
Party	Candidate	1st Pref
DUP	Joe Miller	1,564
SDLP	Gerard Diver	1,198
Sinn Féin	Lynn Fleming	1,137
DUP	April Garfield-Kidd	1,006
UUP	Mary Hamilton	944
DUP	Drew Thompson	859
SDLP	Martin Reilly	478
Sinn Féin	Geraldine O'Donnell	354
People Before Profit	David McAuley	222
PUP	Nigel Gardiner	204
Alliance	Karen Scrivens	142
Turnout		8,108
No change		

=== Down ===
Election results, shaded by plurality of First Preference Votes

Ballynahinch
Party	Candidate	1st Pref
DUP	Garth Craig	1,260
Sinn Féin	Michael Coogan	1,206
UUP	Walter Lyons	843
SDLP	Patrick Toman	828
SDLP	Anne McAleenan	740
Independent	Mark Murnin	369
DUP	Yvonne Moore	275
Alliance	Andy Corkhill	213
Green (NI)	Mark McCormick	176
Turnout		6,026
No change

Downpatrick
Party	Candidate	1st Pref
SDLP	Colin McGrath	1,144
SDLP	Dermot Curran	999
SDLP	Peter Craig	876
Sinn Féin	Eamonn McConvey	832
Sinn Féin	Liam Johnston	674
SDLP	John Doris	606
Green (NI)	Cadogan Enright	549
Sinn Féin	Martin Rice	376
UUP	Anette Holden	330
SDLP	Gareth Sharvin	320
DUP	Andrew Steenson	168
Turnout		7,037
No change

Newcastle
Party	Candidate	1st Pref
Sinn Féin	William Clarke	1,171
SDLP	Eamon O'Neill	1,058
Sinn Féin	Stephen Burns	796
SDLP	Carmel O'Boyle	768
UUP	Desmond Patterson	636
Alliance	Patrick Clarke	565
DUP	Stanley Priestley	522
Sinn Féin	Brian Morgan	465
SDLP	Peter Fitzpatrick	403
Green (NI)	John Hardy	310
Turnout		6,826
Alliance gain from SDLP		

Rowallane
Party	Candidate	1st Pref
DUP	William Dick	1,007
DUP	Billy Walker	920
UUP	Robert Burgess	837
SDLP	Maria McCarthy	809
Independent	Terry Andrews	704
UUP	Graham Furey	700
Alliance	Patrick Brown	474
Sinn Féin	Catriona Mackel	286
SDLP	Patricia McKay	115
Turnout		5,935
Independent gain from UUP		

=== Dungannon and South Tyrone ===
Election results, shaded by plurality of First Preference Votes

Blackwater
Party	Candidate	1st Pref
Sinn Féin	Phelim Gildernew	1,246
DUP	Roger Burton	1,016
DUP	Samuel Brush	1,005
UUP	Jim Hamilton	791
UUP	Jim Brady	781
SDLP	Patrick Daly	640
Sinn Féin	Brian Murtagh	414
TUV	John Hobson	248
Turnout		6,258
No change

Clogher Valley
Party	Candidate	1st Pref
SDLP	Anthony McGonnell	1,046
DUP	Frances Burton	947
Sinn Féin	Sean McGuigan	909
Sinn Féin	Colla McMahon	874
UUP	Robert Mulligan	852
DUP	Wills Robinson	696
UUP	Winston Duff	390
Turnout		6,063
DUP gain from Sinn Féin		

Dungannon Town
Party	Candidate	1st Pref
Independent	Barry Monteith	1,046
DUP	Maurice Morrow	864
UUP	Walter Cuddy	721
Sinn Féin	Larry McLarnon	693
Sinn Féin	Bronwyn McGahan	472
DUP	Kim Ashton	387
SDLP	Vincent Currie	311
SDLP	Malachy Quinn	237
Alliance	Hannah Su	206
UUP	Sammy Stewart	170
TUV	Denis Boyd	160
Turnout		5,369
Barry Monteith leaves Sinn Féin		
Independent gain from SDLP		

Torrent
Party	Candidate	1st Pref
Sinn Féin	Michael Gillespie	1,152
SDLP	Jim Cavanagh	1,122
Sinn Féin	Joe O'Neill	1,050
UUP	Kenneth Reid	818
Sinn Féin	Dessie Donnelly	815
Sinn Féin	Padraig Quinn	675
Independent	Patricia Campbell	510
Independent	James Walshe	483
DUP	Johnny Chartres	344
Turnout		7,073
No change

=== Fermanagh ===
Election results, shaded by plurality of First Preference Votes

Enniskillen
Party	Candidate	1st Pref
UUP	Robert Irvine	1,104
DUP	Alison Brimstone	1,011
Sinn Féin	Seán Lynch	979
DUP	Cyril Brownlee	847
Sinn Féin	Debbie Coyle	691
SDLP	Frank Britton	684
SDLP	Patricia Rodgers	554
UUP	Basil Johnston	524
UUP	Howard Thornton	495
Independent	Pat Cox	456
Sinn Féin	Ciaran May	375
Socialist Party	Donal O'Cofaigh	248
Alliance	Kevin Chaffey	119
Green (NI)	Laurence Speight	63
Independent	Fidelma Leonard	54
Turnout		8,371
UUP gain from SDLP		

Erne East
Party	Candidate	1st Pref
Sinn Féin	Ruth Lynch	1,564
DUP	Paul Robinson	1,370
UUP	Harold Andrews	1,127
Sinn Féin	Thomas O'Reilly	1,115
Sinn Féin	Brian McCaffrey	1,076
Sinn Féin	Sheamus Greene	1,074
SDLP	Rosemary Flanagan	530
UUP	Victor Warrington	513
Independent	Gerry McHugh	377
Turnout		8,927
Sinn Féin gain from SDLP		

Erne North
Party	Candidate	1st Pref
Sinn Féin	Phil Flanagan	1,388
UUP	Raymond Farrell	1,109
UUP	Rosemary Barton	833
DUP	Bert Johnston	803
DUP	Ray Carscadden	587
SDLP	John O'Kane	464
SDLP	John Coyle	370
Independent	Gerry Ferguson	355
TUV	Alex Elliott	309
UUP	David Black	262
Turnout		6,601
No change

Erne West
Party	Candidate	1st Pref
SDLP	Brendan Gallagher	1,265
UUP	Alex Baird	1,259
Sinn Féin	Barry Doherty	1,159
Sinn Féin	Frankie Rice	1,098
Independent	Bernice Swift	1,004
Sinn Féin	Stephen Huggett	757
DUP	Alan Hassard	714
UUP	Ruth Wilson	170
Turnout		7,586
Bernice Swift leaves Sinn Féin		

=== Larne ===
Election results, shaded by plurality of First Preference Votes

Coast Road
Party	Candidate	1st Pref
Sinn Féin	Oliver McMullan	613
DUP	Winston Fulton	458
Independent	Brian Dunn	351
DUP	Gordon Lyons	344
Alliance	Gerardine Mulvenna	340
SDLP	Daniel O'Connor	328
UUP	Maureen Morrow	295
UUP	Andrew Wilson	275
Green (NI)	Danny Donnelly	110
TUV	Kenneth Johnston	105
BNP	Steven Moore	89
Turnout		3,362
Brian Dunn leaves UUP		
Independent gain from DUP		
Sinn Féin gain from SDLP		

Larne Lough
Party	Candidate	1st Pref
DUP	Bobby McKee	1,048
UUP	Roy Beggs	917
Alliance	John Mathews	627
DUP	Gregg McKeen	487
DUP	Sharon McKeen	367
UUP	Mark McKinty	328
TUV	Sam McAllister	286
Alliance	Niamh Spurle	267
Turnout		4,388
No change

Larne Town
Party	Candidate	1st Pref
TUV	Jack McKee	393
Independent	Roy Craig	377
DUP	Drew Niblock	351
Alliance	Michael Lynch	342
SDLP	Martin Wilson	324
DUP	Angela Smyth	319
Independent	Mark Dunn	176
Sinn Féin	Sean Waide	153
PUP	Billy Adamson	146
UUP	Darin Ferguson	146
BNP	Robert Bell	93
Independent	Andrew Swan	79
Turnout		2,927
Jack McKee leaves DUP		
TUV gain from UUP		
Alliance gain from Independent		

=== Limavady ===
Election results, shaded by plurality of First Preference Votes

Bellarena
Party	Candidate	1st Pref
DUP	Joseph Cubitt	1,016
Sinn Féin	Dermot Nicholl	944
Sinn Féin	Cathal McLaughlin	674
UUP	Edwin Stevenson	576
SDLP	Orla Beattie	563
DUP	Jonathan Holmes	371
Independent	Leslie Cubitt	311
SDLP	Oonagh McNickle	296
Turnout		4,850
No change

Benbradagh
Party	Candidate	1st Pref
Sinn Féin	Sean McGlinchey	862
Sinn Féin	Brenda Chivers	776
TUV	Boyd Douglas	922
SDLP	Michael Coyle	567
DUP	Edgar Scott	556
Sinn Féin	Tony McCaul	420
Sinn Féin	Rory Donaghy	396
Alliance	Siobhain Corr	107
Turnout		4,442
Boyd Douglas leaves United Unionist Coalition		

Limavady Town
Party	Candidate	1st Pref
DUP	Alan Robinson	903
Sinn Féin	Anne Brolly	554
UUP	Jack Rankin	346
SDLP	Gerard Mullan	344
UUP	Aaron Callan	247
Independent	Brian Brown	197
DUP	James McCorkell	189
DUP	Jim Quigg	156
Alliance	Damien Corr	133
Turnout		3,116
No change

=== Lisburn ===
Election results, shaded by plurality of First Preference Votes

Downshire
Party	Candidate	1st Pref
DUP	Allan Ewart	1,591
DUP	Paul Stewart	1,555
Alliance	Jennifer Coulter	1,136
DUP	Uel Mackin	1,070
UUP	James Baird	1,052
UUP	Alasdair O'Hara	445
UUP	Richard Price	405
TUV	Kaye Kilpatrick	289
SDLP	Christine Wilson	269
Sinn Féin	Fionnu McCaughley	107
Turnout		8,033
DUP gain from UUP		

Dunmurry Cross
Party	Candidate	1st Pref
Sinn Féin	David Bell	1,796
Sinn Féin	Charlene O'Hara	1,365
Sinn Féin	Arder Carson	1,338
Sinn Féin	Angela Nelson	1,210
Sinn Féin	Stephen Magennis	1,151
DUP	Margaret Tolerton	1,132
SDLP	Brian Heading	1,020
SDLP	Matthew McDermott	629
Alliance	Aaron McIntyre	458
UUP	Mark Hill	346
Turnout		10,696
Sinn Féin gain from SDLP		

Killultagh
Party	Candidate	1st Pref
DUP	Thomas Beckett	1,756
DUP	James Tinsley	1,559
SDLP	Pat Catney	898
Alliance	Owen Gawith	891
Sinn Féin	Mary-Kate Quinn	772
DUP	John Palmer	764
UUP	Jim Dillon	762
UUP	Roy Hanna	676
NI Conservatives	Steve McIlwrath	242
Independent	Cecil Calvert	229
Turnout		8,689
No change

Lisburn Town North
Party	Candidate	1st Pref
DUP	Paul Givan	1,528
DUP	Jonathan Craig	1,481
Alliance	Brian Doran	1,285
UUP	Ronnie Crawford	963
DUP	William Leathem	889
UUP	Brian Bloomfield	622
UUP	David Archer	541
SDLP	John Drake	529
DUP	Ben Mallon	481
Sinn Féin	Terry Quinn	412
Green (NI)	Connor Quinn	263
UUP	Neil McNickle	164
Turnout		9,285
SDLP gain from UUP		

Lisburn Town South
Party	Candidate	1st Pref
DUP	Paul Porter	1,340
DUP	Andrew Ewing	701
DUP	Jennifer Palmer	647
UUP	Alan Carlisle	520
Alliance	Stephen Martin	473
UUP	Tim Mitchell	307
DUP	Roy Young	273
Sinn Féin	Patricia Magennis	177
SDLP	Aisling Twomey	129
SDLP	Marzena Czarnecka	126
Green (NI)	Luke Robinson	109
Independent	Colin Preen	59
Turnout		4,967
No change

=== Magherafelt ===
Election results, shaded by plurality of First Preference Votes

Magherafelt Town
Party	Candidate	1st Pref
Sinn Féin	Peter Bateson	1,616
DUP	Paul McLean	1,074
SDLP	Jim Campbell	849
Sinn Féin	Deborah Ni Shiadhail	804
UUP	George Shiels	694
TUV	Alan Dickson	577
DUP	Wesley Brown	450
Sinn Féin	Catherine Elattar	409
SDLP	Denise Johnston	358
Turnout		6,968
Sinn Féin gain from DUP		

Moyola
Party	Candidate	1st Pref
Sinn Féin	Ian Milne	1,496
DUP	Thomas Catherwood	1,053
Sinn Féin	Sean McPeake	925
UUP	Jackie Crawford	688
Sinn Féin	Caoimhe Scullion	538
SDLP	Ann-Marie McErlean	527
TUV	Alan Millar	494
Independent	Oliver Hughes	440
Turnout		6,268
No change

Sperrin
Party	Candidate	1st Pref
Sinn Féin	Brian McGuigan	1,313
Sinn Féin	Kathleen McEldowney	1,011
Sinn Féin	Sean Kerr	943
SDLP	Kathleen Lagan	895
DUP	Anne Forde	691
Sinn Féin	Gabhan McFalone	677
UUP	Alistair Stewart	590
SDLP	Austin Kelly	567
Independent	Patrick Groogan	410
Turnout		7,198
No change

=== Moyle ===
Election results, shaded by plurality of First Preference Votes

Ballycastle
Party	Candidate	1st Pref
Independent	Padraig McShane	535
Sinn Féin	Cara McShane	405
SDLP	Donal Cunningham	395
UUP	Joan Baird	270
Independent	Kevin McAuley	230
Independent	Seamus Blaney	207
DUP	Christina McFaul	125
Sinn Féin	Paul Hamilton	83
Independent	Helen Harding	71
Turnout		2,363
Independent gain from Sinn Féin		

Giant's Causeway
Party	Candidate	1st Pref
UUP	Sandra Hunter	273
DUP	David McAllister	247
DUP	Robert McIlroy	243
UUP	Willie Graham	233
Independent	Derwyn Brewster	170
TUV	Sharon McKillop	164
DUP	George Hartin	151
UUP	Jacqui McVicker	133
Turnout		1,655
Robert McIlroy leaves UUP		
UUP gain from DUP		
TUV gain from Independent		

The Glens
Party	Candidate	1st Pref
Independent	Colum Thompson	466
Sinn Féin	Anne McKillop	330
SDLP	Justin McCamphill	321
SDLP	Catherine McCambridge	320
Independent	Daniel McDonnell	319
Sinn Féin	Noreen McAllister	297
Sinn Féin	Kieran Mulholland	266
DUP	Walter Greer	185
Turnout		2,546
Independent gain from SDLP		

=== Newry and Mourne ===
Election results, shaded by plurality of First Preference Votes

Crotlieve
Party	Candidate	1st Pref
Sinn Féin	Michael Ruane	1,640
SDLP	Declan McAteer	1,467
SDLP	Michael Carr	1,302
Sinn Féin	Mick Murphy	1,261
SDLP	Sean O'Hare	1,211
Sinn Féin	Peter Kearney	800
UUP	William Mitchell	733
Independent	Jarlath Tinnelly	494
SDLP	Connaire McGreevey	490
Green (NI)	Bonnie Anley	307
Turnout		9,859
SDLP gain from Green		
Sinn Féin gain from Independent		

Newry Town
Party	Candidate	1st Pref
Sinn Féin	Charlie Casey	1,280
Independent	Davy Hyland	1,007
Sinn Féin	Valerie Harte	891
SDLP	John McCardle	829
Independent	Jackie Patterson	751
Sinn Féin	Brendan Curran	632
Sinn Féin	Marian O'Reilly	518
SDLP	Gary Stokes	518
UUP	Colin McElroy	424
SDLP	Frank Feely	401
SDLP	Joe Coyle	317
Independent	James Malone	10
Turnout		7,731
Independent gain from SDLP		

Slieve Gullion
Party	Candidate	1st Pref
SDLP	Geraldine Donnelly	1,681
Sinn Féin	Terry Hearty	1,320
Sinn Féin	Colman Burns	1,312
Sinn Féin	Packie McDonald	1,166
Sinn Féin	Anthony Flynn	1,165
Sinn Féin	Padra McNamee	980
Turnout		7,774
No change

The Fews
Party	Candidate	1st Pref
UUP	Andy Moffett	1,421
Sinn Féin	Turlough Murphy	1,299
Sinn Féin	Pat McGinn	1,204
SDLP	John Feehan	1,191
Sinn Féin	Jimmy McCreesh	1,065
SDLP	Kevin O'Hare	606
UUP	David Taylor	425
DUP	Glenn Oliver	331
TUV	Barrie Halliday	178
Turnout		7,887
UUP gain from DUP		

The Mournes
Party	Candidate	1st Pref
UKIP	Henry Reilly	1,910
Sinn Féin	Sean Doran	1,344
SDLP	Sean Rogers	990
DUP	James Burns	784
UUP	Harold McKee	585
UUP	David McCauley	490
SDLP	Theresa McLaverty	440
TUV	Arthur Coulter	230
Green (NI)	Heather McDermott	75
DUP	Michelle Burns	57
Turnout		7,004
Henry Reilly leaves UUP		

=== Newtownabbey ===
Election results, shaded by plurality of First Preference Votes

Antrim Line
Party	Candidate	1st Pref
Alliance	John Blair	1,367
DUP	Paula Bradley	1,222
SDLP	Noreen McClelland	1,205
Sinn Féin	Marie MacKessy	1,088
DUP	Audrey Ball	1,063
Sinn Féin	Gerard O'Reilly	880
UUP	Mark Cosgrove	571
DUP	Paul Livingstone	563
UUP	Ben Coote	433
UUP	Kathy Wolff	173
Turnout		8,703
Sinn Féin gain from DUP		

Ballyclare
Party	Candidate	1st Pref
DUP	Paul Girvan	2,545
Alliance	Pat McCudden	924
UUP	Jim Bingham	897
UUP	Vera McWilliam	713
DUP	Jackie Mann	421
DUP	Victoria Girvan	382
UUP	Gavin Eastwood	183
Turnout		6,174
Alliance gain from UUP		

Macedon
Party	Candidate	1st Pref
DUP	William DeCourcy	1,146
Alliance	Billy Webb	756
DUP	Victor Robinson	675
DUP	Thomas Hogg	581
Sinn Féin	Mary Gillen	464
UUP	John Scott	415
Independent	Tommy Kirkham	396
DUP	Dineen Walker	361
Turnout		4,916
Billy Webb leaves NRA		
DUP gain from Independent		

University
Party	Candidate	1st Pref
DUP	William Ball	1,328
DUP	Pamela Barr	1,015
UUP	Fraser Agnew	965
Alliance	Tom Campbell	904
UUP	Ken Robinson	730
DUP	Robert Hill	645
Alliance	Lynn Frazer	545
PUP	Phil Hamilton	506
Independent	Stephen Ross	481
UUP	Barbara Gilliland	327
SDLP	Dominic Mullaghan	262
Sinn Féin	James McKeown	215
BNP	Stephen Parkes	104
Turnout		8,190
Fraser Agnew leaves United Unionist Coalition		
Alliance gain from UUP		

=== North Down ===
Election results, shaded by plurality of First Preference Votes

Abbey
Party	Candidate	1st Pref
DUP	Ruby Cooling	859
Alliance	Michael Bower	791
DUP	Wesley Irvine	697
Green (NI)	Steven Agnew	618
DUP	Harry Dunlop	536
DUP	John Montgomery	485
Community Partnership	Mark Gordon	365
UUP	Heather Bingham-Steele	303
UUP	Aaron Jamison	218
NI Conservatives	Dean Russell	126
UKIP	William Ferguson	102
Community Partnership	Karen Worrall	76
UKIP	Stuart Tanner	73
Independent	Ed Simpson	44
Independent	Robert Mooney	35
Turnout		5,495
Harry Dunlop leaves UUP		
Green gain from UUP		

Ballyholme and Groomsport
Party	Candidate	1st Pref
DUP	Alex Easton	1,812
Independent	Alan Chambers	1,481
DUP	Peter Weir	762
Alliance	Christine Bower	606
DUP	Peter Martin	529
Alliance	Adam Harbinson	523
Independent	Austin Lennon	503
UUP	Colin Breen	463
UUP	Ian Henry	414
Green (NI)	Paul Roberts	390
NI Conservatives	David Symington	235
Independent	Roberta Dunlop	223
UUP	Francis McCully	173
UKIP	Pat Toms	101
Turnout		8,322
DUP gain from UUP		

Bangor West
Party	Candidate	1st Pref
Independent	Brian Wilson	1,458
DUP	Alan Graham	1,087
DUP	Alan Leslie	931
Alliance	Anne Wilson	808
UUP	Marion Smith	688
Alliance	Tony Hill	441
Green (NI)	Joanne Dunlop	301
SDLP	Liam Logan	298
UUP	James McKerrow	288
Community Partnership	Alison Blayney	192
NI Conservatives	Julian Robertson	181
Community Partnership	Jamie Bryson	167
UKIP	Ade Benson	151
Turnout		7,151
Brian Wilson leaves Green		

Holywood
Party	Candidate	1st Pref
DUP	Gordon Dunne	1,081
Alliance	Andrew Muir	991
UUP	Ellie McKay	675
Green (NI)	John Barry	525
Alliance	Larry Thompson	401
DUP	Jennifer Gilmour	252
UUP	Gillian Mcgimpsey	250
NI Conservatives	David O'Callaghan	185
Turnout		4,436
DUP gain from UUP		

=== Omagh ===
Election results, shaded by plurality of First Preference Votes

Mid Tyrone
Party	Candidate	1st Pref
Sinn Féin	John Clarke	1,211
UUP	Robert Wilson	1,152
Sinn Féin	Declan McAleer	1,134
Sinn Féin	Anne Fitzgerald	925
SDLP	Seamus Shields	910
DUP	Charles Chittick	796
Sinn Féin	John Donnelly	755
Sinn Féin	Sharon O'Brien	527
Independent	Paul Grogan	475
Independent	Ciaran McClean	178
Turnout		8,233
No change

Omagh Town
Party	Candidate	1st Pref
DUP	Errol Thompson	1,064
UUP	Ross Hussey	926
Sinn Féin	Adrian Begley	790
SDLP	Josephine Deehan	583
Sinn Féin	James Mccolgan	583
Sinn Féin	Sorcha Mcanespy	565
Independent	Paddy McGowan	536
Independent	Johnny McLaughlin	482
Alliance	Eric Bullick	244
SDLP	Steven Brown	205
Alliance	Victoria Geelan	80
Turnout		6,184
No change

West Tyrone
Party	Candidate	1st Pref
Sinn Féin	Glenn Campbell	1,375
DUP	Thomas Buchanan	1,265
SDLP	Patrick McDonnell	1,245
Sinn Féin	Cecilia Quinn	1,025
UUP	Allan Rainey	843
Sinn Féin	Peter Kelly	746
Sinn Féin	Frankie Donnelly	717
DUP	Elaine Thompson	499
UUP	Jane Clarke	241
Turnout		8,130
No change

=== Strabane ===
Election results, shaded by plurality of First Preference Votes

Derg
Party	Candidate	1st Pref
DUP	Thomas Kerrigan	931
Sinn Féin	Kieran McGuire	912
Sinn Féin	Ruairi McHugh	882
UUP	Derek Hussey	813
Sinn Féin	Maoliosa McHugh	588
UUP	Ryan Moses	531
DUP	Kathleen Craig	526
Independent	Gerrard Foley	467
SDLP	Charlie McNamee	274
Turnout		6,048
No change

Glenelly
Party	Candidate	1st Pref
DUP	Allan Bresland	1,560
Sinn Féin	Dan Kelly	1,095
DUP	John Donnell	620
Sinn Féin	Michelle McMackin	613
SDLP	Thomas McBride	565
DUP	Rhonda Hamilton	402
UUP	Flora Magee	333
UUP	Joe McCormick	204
Turnout		5,495
Sinn Féin gain from SDLP		
DUP gain from UUP		

Mourne
Party	Candidate	1st Pref
Independent	James O'Kane	859
Sinn Féin	Brian McMahon	855
Sinn Féin	Karina Carlin	686
Sinn Féin	Jay McCauley	679
Irish Republican Socialist	Paul Gallagher	666
Independent	Eugene McMenamin	565
Sinn Féin	Stephen Dunnion	524
UUP	Billy Harpur	478
SDLP	Patsy Kelly	395
SDLP	Eugene Mullen	371
Turnout		6,220
Eugene McMenamin leaves SDLP		
Independent gain from Sinn Féin		
