= 1989 Moyle District Council election =

Local government election in Northern Ireland

← 1985	17 May 1989	1993 →

All 15 seats to Moyle District Council 8 seats needed for a majority
	First party	Second party	Third party
Party	SDLP	DUP	UUP
Seats won	4	3	2
Seat change	0	0	0
	Fourth party	Fifth party	Sixth party
Party	Independent	Ind. Unionist	Sinn Féin
Seats won	2	2	1
Seat change	▲1	0	▼1
	Seventh party
Party	Ind. Nationalist
Seats won	1
Seat change	0

Elections to Moyle District Council were held on 17 May 1989 on the same day as the other Northern Irish local government elections. The election used three district electoral areas to elect a total of 15 councillors.

== Election results ==
Moyle District Council Election Result 1989
Party	Seats	Gains	Losses	Net gain/loss	Seats %	Votes %	Votes	+/−
SDLP	4	0	0	0	20.0	29.6	1,756	▼0.8
DUP	3	0	0	0	20.0	19.3	1,143	▼1.7
Independent	2	1	0	▲1	13.3	16.3	969	▲10.5
Ind. Unionist	2	0	0	0	13.3	15.5	919	▲6.6
UUP	2	0	0	0	13.3	8.8	522	▼7.4
Ind. Nationalist	1	0	0	0	13.3	5.0	297	▲0.7
Sinn Féin	1	0	1	▼1	6.7	5.6	331	▼6.6

Note: "Votes" are the first preference votes.

== Districts summary ==
Results of the Moyle District Council election, 1989 by district
Ward	%	Cllrs	%	Cllrs	%	Cllrs	%	Cllrs	%	Cllrs	Total Cllrs
Ward	SDLP		DUP		UUP		Sinn Féin		Others		Total Cllrs
Ballycastle	25.2	1	20.5	1	11.6	1	0.0	0	42.7	2	5
Giant's Causeway	0.0	0	29.3	2	17.6	1	0.0	0	53.1	2	5
The Glens	55.1	3	10.8	0	0.0	0	14.2	1	19.9	1	5
Total	29.6	4	19.3	3	8.8	2	5.6	1	36.7	5	15

== District results ==
=== Ballycastle ===
1985: 1 x SDLP, 1 x DUP, 1 x UUP, 1 x Sinn Féin, 1 x Independent
1989: 2 x Independent, 1 x SDLP, 1 x DUP, 1 x UUP
1985-1989 Change: Independent gain from Sinn Féin

Ballycastle - 5 seats
Party	Candidate	FPv%	Count				
Party	Candidate	FPv%	1	2	3	4	5
DUP	Gardiner Kane*	20.52%	385				
SDLP	Michael O'Cleary*	20.20%	379				
Independent	Archibald McAuley	11.62%	218	221.2	232.2	251.96	318.96
Independent	James McShane*	10.77%	202	202.2	233.2	251.82	300.77
UUP	Robert McPherson*	11.62%	218	284.2	285.2	285.2	297.39
Independent	Seamus Blaney	11.78%	221	221.4	231.4	242.61	273.6
Independent	Christopher McCaughan	8.53%	160	161.2	177.2	191.64	
SDLP	Noel McCurdy	4.96%	93	93.6			
Electorate: 3,489 Valid: 1,876 (53.77%) Spoilt: 50 Quota: 313 Turnout: 1,926 (55.20%)

=== Giant's Causeway ===
1985: 2 x Independent Unionist, 2 x DUP, 1 x UUP
1989: 2 x Independent Unionist, 2 x DUP, 1 x UUP
1985-1989 Change: No change

Giant's Causeway - 5 seats
Party	Candidate	FPv%	Count	
Party	Candidate	FPv%	1	2
Ind. Unionist	Robert McIlroy	32.02%	554	
DUP	James Rodgers*	21.39%	370	
Ind. Unionist	Price McConaghy*	18.44%	319	
UUP	Robert Getty*	17.57%	304	
DUP	Glenda Rodgers	7.92%	137	346.71
Ind. Unionist	Ronnie McIlvar	2.66%	46	100.27
Electorate: 3,226 Valid: 1,730 (53.63%) Spoilt: 48 Quota: 289 Turnout: 1,778 (55.11%)

=== The Glens ===
1985: 3 x SDLP, 1 x Sinn Féin, 1 x Independent Nationalist
1989: 3 x SDLP, 1 x Sinn Féin, 1 x Independent Nationalist
1985-1989 Change: No change

The Glens - 5 seats
Party	Candidate	FPv%	Count			
Party	Candidate	FPv%	1	2	3	4
SDLP	Malachy McSparran*	20.08%	468			
Ind. Nationalist	Randal McDonnell*	12.74%	297	321.14	389.41	
SDLP	Joseph Mitchell	12.18%	284	296.92	321.77	420.77
SDLP	Patrick McBride*	14.76%	344	349.95	355.14	397.14
Sinn Féin	James McCarry	14.20%	331	333.72	358.4	389.29
DUP	Elizabeth White	10.77%	251	251.17	253.34	255.36
SDLP	Daniel Anderson*	8.07%	188	207.04	244.1	
Independent	Michael Brogan	7.21%	168	180.58		
Electorate: 3,606 Valid: 2,331 (64.64%) Spoilt: 29 Quota: 389 Turnout: 2,360 (65.45%)
