= 1985 Moyle District Council election =

Local government election in Northern Ireland

← 1981	15 May 1985	1989 →

All 15 seats to Moyle District Council 8 seats needed for a majority
	First party	Second party	Third party
Party	SDLP	DUP	UUP
Seats won	4	3	2
Seat change	▼1	▲1	▼2
	Fourth party	Fifth party	Sixth party
Party	Sinn Féin	Ind. Unionist	Independent
Seats won	2	2	1
Seat change	▲2	0	▼2
	Seventh party
Party	Ind. Nationalist
Seats won	1
Seat change	▲1

Elections to Moyle District Council were held on 15 May 1985 on the same day as the other Northern Irish local government elections. The election used three district electoral areas to elect a total of 15 councillors.

== Election results ==
Moyle District Council Election Result 1985
Party	Seats	Gains	Losses	Net gain/loss	Seats %	Votes %	Votes	+/−
SDLP	4	0	1	▼1	26.7	30.4	1,939	▼2.0
DUP	3	1	0	▲1	20.0	21.0	1,337	▲5.9
UUP	2	0	2	▼2	13.3	16.2	1,035	▲2.7
Sinn Féin	2	2	0	▲2	13.3	12.2	777	New
Ind. Unionist	2	0	0	0	13.3	8.9	568	▼1.4
Independent	1	0	2	▼2	6.7	5.8	372	▼12.6
Ind. Nationalist	1	0	0	0	6.7	4.3	271	▲0.7
Irish Independence	0	0	0	0	0.0	1.1	71	▼6.2

Note: "Votes" are the first preference votes.

== Districts summary ==
Results of the Moyle District Council election, 1985 by district
Ward	%	Cllrs	%	Cllrs	%	Cllrs	%	Cllrs	%	Cllrs	Total Cllrs
Ward	SDLP		DUP		UUP		Sinn Féin		Others		Total Cllrs
Ballycastle	28.5	1	26.2	1	12.9	1	13.8	1	18.6	1	5
Giant's Causeway	0.0	0	41.8	2	29.1	1	0.0	0	29.1	2	5
The Glens	56.4	3	0.0	0	8.8	0	20.7	1	14.1	1	5
Total	30.4	4	21.0	3	16.2	2	12.2	2	20.2	4	15

== District results ==
=== Ballycastle ===
1985: 1 x SDLP, 1 x DUP, 1 x UUP, 1 x Sinn Féin, 1 x Independent

Ballycastle - 5 seats
Party	Candidate	FPv%	Count					
Party	Candidate	FPv%	1	2	3	4	5	6
DUP	Gardiner Kane	26.24%	524					
UUP	Robert McPherson	12.77%	255	434.82				
SDLP	Michael O'Cleary*	16.37%	327	327.74	331.07	366.07		
Sinn Féin	Francis McCarry	13.82%	276	276.37	276.37	285.37	285.37	316.07
Independent	James McShane*	10.92%	218	219.11	223.55	228.55	230.43	288.24
Independent	Archibald McAuley*	7.71%	154	158.81	210.98	218.35	219.29	281.35
SDLP	Richard Kerr*	7.41%	148	149.48	152.81	188.18	218.26	
SDLP	Noel McCurdy	4.76%	95	95.37	96.48			
Electorate: 3,235 Valid: 1,997 (61.73%) Spoilt: 48 Quota: 333 Turnout: 2,045 (63.21%)

=== Giant's Causeway ===
1985: 2 x Independent Unionist, 2 x DUP, 1 x UUP

Giant's Causeway - 5 seats
Party	Candidate	FPv%	Count				
Party	Candidate	FPv%	1	2	3	4	5
DUP	James Rodgers*	18.38%	358				
Ind. Unionist	Price McConaghy*	17.35%	338				
UUP	Robert Getty*	16.84%	328				
DUP	Duncan Hill	12.53%	244	258.76	261.16	428.16	
Ind. Unionist	Mary Morrison*	11.81%	230	232.79	237.83	270.78	307.78
UUP	James McAuley*	12.27%	239	245.12	249.28	258.86	296.86
DUP	Ronnie McIlvar*	10.83%	211	219.28	219.72		
Electorate: 3,149 Valid: 1,948 (61.86%) Spoilt: 40 Quota: 325 Turnout: 1,988 (63.13%)

=== The Glens ===
1985: 3 x SDLP, 1 x Sinn Féin, 1 x Independent Nationalist

The Glens - 5 seats
Party	Candidate	FPv%	Count						
Party	Candidate	FPv%	1	2	3	4	5	6	7
Sinn Féin	John Regan	12.41%	301	321	327	327	441		
SDLP	Malachy McSparran*	14.14%	343	346	351	367	375	391	396
SDLP	Patrick McBride*	10.43%	253	253	260	326	354	373	385
SDLP	Daniel Anderson	13.24%	321	338	340	353	356	365	366
Ind. Nationalist	Randal McDonnell	11.18%	271	292	295	305	317	349	359
SDLP	Dermot McMullan	13.57%	329	336	337	343	349	349	351
UUP	Hugh Acheson*	8.78%	213	213	213	214	215		
Sinn Féin	James McCarry	4.87%	118	118	172	185			
SDLP	Mary Hegarty	5.07%	123	124	127				
Sinn Féin	James McMullan	3.38%	82	83					
Irish Independence	John McKay	2.93%	71						
Electorate: 3,408 Valid: 2,425 (71.16%) Spoilt: 47 Quota: 405 Turnout: 2,472 (72.54%)
