= Giant's Causeway (District Electoral Area) =

District electoral areas in Moyle, Northern Ireland

Giant's Causeway DEA (1993-2014) within Moyle

Giant's Causeway was one of the three district electoral areas in Moyle, Northern Ireland which existed from 1985 to 2014. The district elected five members to Moyle District Council, and formed part of the North Antrim constituencies for the Northern Ireland Assembly and UK Parliament.

It was created for the 1985 local elections, replacing Moyle Area B which had existed since 1973, and contained the wards of Ballylough, Bushmills, Carnmoon, Dunservick and Moss-Side and Moyarget. It was abolished for the 2014 local elections and divided between The Glens DEA and the new Causeway DEA.

== Councillors ==
Election	Councillor (Party)	Councillor (Party)	Councillor (Party)	Councillor (Party)	Councillor (Party)
2011	William Graham (UUP)	Sandra Hunter (UUP)	David McAllister (DUP)	Robert McIlroy (DUP)/ (UUP)/ (Independent Unionist)	Sharon McKillop (TUV)
2005	William Graham (UUP)	George Hartin (DUP)	David McAllister (DUP)	Robert McIlroy (DUP)/ (UUP)/ (Independent Unionist)	Price McConaghy (Independent Unionist)
2001	William Graham (UUP)	George Hartin (DUP)	David McAllister (DUP)	Robert McIlroy (DUP)/ (UUP)/ (Independent Unionist)	Price McConaghy (Independent Unionist)
1997	William Graham (UUP)	George Hartin (DUP)	David McAllister (DUP)	Robert McIlroy (DUP)/ (UUP)/ (Independent Unionist)	Price McConaghy (Independent Unionist)
1993	Robert Getty (UUP)	Thomas Brennan (DUP)	David McAllister (DUP)	Robert McIlroy (DUP)/ (UUP)/ (Independent Unionist)	Price McConaghy (Independent Unionist)
1989	Robert Getty (UUP)	Glenda Rodgers (DUP)	James Rodgers (DUP)	Robert McIlroy (DUP)/ (UUP)/ (Independent Unionist)	Price McConaghy (Independent Unionist)
1985	Robert Getty (UUP)	Duncan Hill (DUP)	James Rodgers (DUP)	Mary Morrison (Independent Unionist)	Price McConaghy (Independent Unionist)

== 2011 Election ==
2005: 2 x DUP, 2 x UUP, 1 x Independent

2011: 2 x DUP, 2 x UUP, 1 x TUV

2005-2011 Change: TUV gain from Independent

Giant's Causeway - 5 seats
Party	Candidate	FPv%	Count				
Party	Candidate	FPv%	1	2	3	4	5
UUP	Sandra Hunter	16.91%	273				
UUP	William Graham*	14.44%	233	315			
DUP	Robert McIlroy*	15.06%	243	258	272		
DUP	David McAllister*	15.30%	247	251	255	371	
TUV	Sharon McKillop	10.16%	164	174	185	214	236
Independent	Derwyn Brewster	10.53%	170	176	180	182	193
DUP	George Hartin*	9.36%	151	157	165		
UUP	Jacqui McVicker	8.24%	133				
Electorate: 3,060 Valid: 1,614 (52.75%) Spoilt: 41 Quota: 270 Turnout: 1,655 (54.08%)

== 2005 Election ==
2001: 2 x DUP, 2 x UUP, 1 x Independent

2005: 2 x DUP, 2 x UUP, 1 x Independent

2001-2005 Change: No change

Giant's Causeway - 5 seats
Party	Candidate	FPv%	Count	
Party	Candidate	FPv%	1	2
DUP	David McAllister*	28.39%	481	
DUP	George Hartin*	27.74%	470	
UUP	William Graham*	19.24%	326	
UUP	Robert McIlroy*	10.15%	172	295.54
Independent	Price McConaghy*	13.11%	222	281.74
Independent	Thomas Palmer	1.36%	23	37.5
Electorate: 3,015 Valid: 1,694 (56.19%) Spoilt: 49 Quota: 283 Turnout: 1,743 (57.81%)

== 2001 Election ==
1997: 2 x DUP, 2 x UUP, 1 x Independent Unionist

2001: 2 x DUP, 2 x UUP, 1 x Independent

1997-2001 Change: Independent Unionist becomes Independent

Giant's Causeway - 5 seats
Party	Candidate	FPv%	Count				
Party	Candidate	FPv%	1	2	3	4	5
DUP	David McAllister*	23.95%	495				
UUP	William Graham*	19.25%	398				
Independent	Price McConaghy*	17.76%	367				
DUP	George Hartin*	12.48%	258	323.41	330.03	335.73	337.97
UUP	Robert McIlroy*	10.79%	223	240.67	281.98	321.28	335.35
DUP	Ian Chestnutt	11.03%	228	291.86	294.86	302.66	306.65
SDLP	Moira McGouran	3.68%	76	76.31			
Independent	Thomas Palmer	1.06%	22	24.48			
Electorate: 3,123 Valid: 2,067 (66.19%) Spoilt: 47 Quota: 345 Turnout: 2,114 (67.69%)

== 1997 Election ==
1993: 2 x Independent Unionist, 2 x DUP, 1 x UUP

1997: 2 x DUP, 2 x UUP, 1 x Independent Unionist

1993-1997 Change: Independent Unionist joins UUP

Giant's Causeway - 5 seats
Party	Candidate	FPv%	Count					
Party	Candidate	FPv%	1	2	3	4	5	6
Ind. Unionist	Price McConaghy*	28.83%	484					
UUP	William Graham	15.66%	263	308.54				
DUP	David McAllister*	16.56%	278	297.32				
DUP	George Hartin	14.12%	237	244.82	245.82	303.82		
UUP	Robert McIlroy*	10.48%	176	231.66	237.04	246.34	261.04	272.04
UUP	Raymond Rodgers	7.50%	126	180.74	190.42	213.56	226.86	237.86
DUP	Allan Mulholland	5.54%	93	101.74	105.66			
Independent	Thomas Palmer	1.31%	22	31.2				
Electorate: 3,189 Valid: 1,679 (52.65%) Spoilt: 58 Quota: 280 Turnout: 1,737 (54.47%)

== 1993 Election ==
1989: 2 x Independent Unionist, 2 x DUP, 1 x UUP

1993: 2 x Independent Unionist, 2 x DUP, 1 x UUP

1989-1993 Change: No change

Giant's Causeway - 5 seats
Party	Candidate	FPv%	Count				
Party	Candidate	FPv%	1	2	3	4	5
Ind. Unionist	Price McConaghy*	26.48%	465				
Ind. Unionist	Robert McIlroy*	18.28%	321				
DUP	Thomas Brennan	14.46%	254	264.66	293.66		
DUP	David McAllister	13.55%	238	267.93	281.93	288.95	299.95
UUP	Robert Getty*	10.25%	180	216.08	221.72	227.48	298.48
Ind. Unionist	James Rodgers*	6.55%	115	161.74	173.48	182.48	208.48
UUP	Robert Thompson	6.72%	118	149.98	158.26	162.31	
Ind. Unionist	Ronnie McIlvar	2.79%	49	60.07			
Independent	Thomas Palmer	0.91%	16	20.1			
Electorate: 3,143 Valid: 1,756 (55.87%) Spoilt: 40 Quota: 293 Turnout: 1,796 (57.14%)

== 1989 Election ==
1985: 2 x Independent Unionist, 2 x DUP, 1 x UUP

1989: 2 x Independent Unionist, 2 x DUP, 1 x UUP

1985-1989 Change: No change

Giant's Causeway - 5 seats
Party	Candidate	FPv%	Count	
Party	Candidate	FPv%	1	2
Ind. Unionist	Robert McIlroy	32.02%	554	
DUP	James Rodgers*	21.39%	370	
Ind. Unionist	Price McConaghy*	18.44%	319	
UUP	Robert Getty*	17.57%	304	
DUP	Glenda Rodgers	7.92%	137	346.71
Ind. Unionist	Ronnie McIlvar	2.66%	46	100.27
Electorate: 3,226 Valid: 1,730 (53.63%) Spoilt: 48 Quota: 289 Turnout: 1,778 (55.11%)

== 1985 Election ==
1985: 2 x Independent Unionist, 2 x DUP, 1 x UUP

Giant's Causeway - 5 seats
Party	Candidate	FPv%	Count				
Party	Candidate	FPv%	1	2	3	4	5
DUP	James Rodgers*	18.38%	358				
Ind. Unionist	Price McConaghy*	17.35%	338				
UUP	Robert Getty*	16.84%	328				
DUP	Duncan Hill	12.53%	244	258.76	261.16	428.16	
Ind. Unionist	Mary Morrison*	11.81%	230	232.79	237.83	270.78	307.78
UUP	James McAuley*	12.27%	239	245.12	249.28	258.86	296.86
DUP	Ronnie McIlvar*	10.83%	211	219.28	219.72		
Electorate: 3,149 Valid: 1,948 (61.86%) Spoilt: 40 Quota: 325 Turnout: 1,988 (63.13%)
