= 2011 Irish elections =

2011 Irish elections may refer to:

== Republic of Ireland ==
- 2011 Irish general election
- 2011 Irish presidential election

== Northern Ireland ==
- 2011 Northern Ireland Assembly election
- 2011 Northern Ireland local elections
