= 2011 Moyle District Council election =

Local government election in Northern Ireland

- 5 May 2011

All 15 seats to Moyle District Council 8 seats needed for a majority
	First party	Second party	Third party
Party	Independent	Sinn Féin	UUP
Seats won	4	3	3
Seat change	▲1	▼1	Steady
	Fourth party	Fifth party	Sixth party
Party	SDLP	DUP	TUV
Seats won	2	2	1
Seat change	▼1	Steady	▲1
- Party with the most votes by district.

Elections to Moyle District Council were held on 5 May 2011 on the same day as the other Northern Irish local government elections. The election used three district electoral areas to elect a total of 15 councillors.

== Election results ==
Moyle District Council Election Result 2011
Party	Seats	Gains	Losses	Net gain/loss	Seats %	Votes %	Votes	+/−
Independent	4	2	1	▲1	26.7	31.0	1,998	▲16.7
Sinn Féin	3	0	1	▼1	20.0	21.4	1,381	▼9.0
UUP	3	0	0	Steady	20.0	14.1	909	▲1.7
SDLP	2	0	1	▼1	13.3	16.1	1,036	▼4.9
DUP	2	0	0	Steady	13.3	14.8	955	▼7.1
TUV	1	1	0	▲1	6.7	2.5	164	New

Note: "Votes" are the first preference votes.

== Districts summary ==
Results of the Moyle District Council election, 2011 by district
Ward	%	Cllrs	%	Cllrs	%	Cllrs	%	Cllrs	%	Cllrs	%	Cllrs	Total Cllrs
Ward	Sinn Féin		UUP		SDLP		DUP		TUV		Others		Total Cllrs
Ballycastle	21.0	0	11.6	1	17.0	1	5.5	0	0.0	0	44.9	2	5
Giant's Causeway	0.0	0	39.6	2	0.0	0	39.7	2	10.2	1	10.5	0	5
The Glens	35.7	2	0.0	0	25.6	1	7.4	0	0.0	0	31.3	2	5
Total	21.4	3	14.1	3	16.1	2	14.8	2	2.5	1	31.1	4	15

== Districts results ==
=== Ballycastle ===
2005: 2 x Sinn Féin, 1 x SDLP, 1 x UUP, 1 x Independent
2011: 2 x Independent, 1 x Sinn Féin, 1 x SDLP, 1 x UUP
2005-2011 Change: Independent gain from Sinn Féin

Ballycastle - 5 seats
Party	Candidate	FPv%	Count				
Party	Candidate	FPv%	1	2	3	4	5
Independent	Padraig McShane	23.01%	535				
Sinn Féin	Cara McShane*	17.42%	405				
SDLP	Donal Cunningham	16.99%	395				
UUP	Joan Baird	11.61%	270	272.04	290.38	290.62	388.62
Independent	Seamus Blaney*	8.90%	207	271.26	293.32	296.72	347.84
Independent	Kevin McAuley	9.89%	230	259.24	279.26	281.38	317.56
DUP	Christina McFaul	5.55%	129	130.02	140.02	140.1	
Sinn Féin	Paul Hamilton	3.57%	83	124.14	125.48	134	
Independent	Helen Harding*	3.05%	71	79.84			
Electorate: 4,282 Valid: 2,325 (54.30%) Spoilt: 38 Quota: 388 Turnout: 2,363 (55.18%)

=== Giant's Causeway ===
2005: 2 x DUP, 2 x UUP, 1 x Independent
2011: 2 x DUP, 2 x UUP, 1 x TUV
2005-2011 Change: TUV gain from Independent

Giant's Causeway - 5 seats
Party	Candidate	FPv%	Count				
Party	Candidate	FPv%	1	2	3	4	5
UUP	Sandra Hunter	16.91%	273				
UUP	William Graham*	14.44%	233	315			
DUP	Robert McIlroy*	15.06%	243	258	272		
DUP	David McAllister*	15.30%	247	251	255	371	
TUV	Sharon McKillop	10.16%	164	174	185	214	236
Independent	Derwyn Brewster	10.53%	170	176	180	182	193
DUP	George Hartin*	9.36%	151	157	165		
UUP	Jacqui McVicker	8.24%	133				
Electorate: 3,060 Valid: 1,614 (52.75%) Spoilt: 41 Quota: 270 Turnout: 1,655 (54.08%)

=== The Glens ===
2005: 2 x Sinn Féin, 2 x SDLP, 1 x Independent
2011: 2 x Sinn Féin, 2 x Independent, 1 x SDLP
2005-2011 Change: Independent gain from SDLP

The Glens - 5 seats
Party	Candidate	FPv%	Count				
Party	Candidate	FPv%	1	2	3	4	5
Independent	Colum Thompson	18.61%	466				
Sinn Féin	Margaret Anne McKillop	13.18%	330	331	349.7	510.7	
Sinn Féin	Noreen McAllister	11.86%	297	304	308.4	338.2	413.8
SDLP	Catherine McCambridge*	12.78%	320	353	354.9	390.1	400.9
Independent	Randal McDonnell*	12.74%	319	338	346.3	369.6	371.4
SDLP	Justin McCamphill	12.82%	321	324	331.7	341.4	345
Sinn Féin	Kieran Mulholland	10.62%	266	267	269.8		
DUP	Walter Greer	7.39%	185				
Electorate: 4,332 Valid: 2,504 (57.80%) Spoilt: 42 Quota: 418 Turnout: 2,546 (58.77%)
