= Ballycastle (District Electoral Area) =

District electoral areas in Moyle, Northern Ireland

Ballycastle DEA (1993-2014) within Moyle

Ballycastle was one of the three district electoral areas in Moyle, Northern Ireland which existed from 1985 to 2014. The district elected five members to Moyle District Council, and formed part of the North Antrim constituencies for the Northern Ireland Assembly and UK Parliament.

It was created for the 1985 local elections, replacing Moyle Area C which had existed since 1973, and contained the wards of Bonamargy and Rathlin, Dalriada, Glentaisie, Kinbane and Knocklayd. It was abolished for the 2014 local elections and most of the area was transferred to The Glens DEA.

== Councillors ==
Election	Councillor (party)	Councillor (party)	Councillor (party)	Councillor (party)	Councillor (party)
2011	Seamus Blaney (Independent)	Donal Cunningham (SDLP)	Padraig McShane (Independent)	Cara McShane (Sinn Féin)	Joan Baird (UUP)
2005	Seamus Blaney (Independent)	Madeline Black (SDLP)	Cathal Newcombe (Sinn Féin)	Cara McShane (Sinn Féin)	Helen Harding (UUP)
2001	Seamus Blaney (Independent)	Madeline Black (SDLP)	Michael Molloy (SDLP)	Gardiner Kane (DUP)	Helen Harding (UUP)
1997	Seamus Blaney (Independent)	Christopher McCaughan (Independent)	Richard Kerr (SDLP)	Gardiner Kane (DUP)	Helen Harding (UUP)
1993	Seamus Blaney (Independent)	Christopher McCaughan (Independent)	Richard Kerr (SDLP)	Gardiner Kane (DUP)	Helen Harding (UUP)
1989	James McShane (Independent)	Archibald McAuley (Independent)	Michael O'Cleary (SDLP)	Gardiner Kane (DUP)	Robert McPherson (UUP)
1985	James McShane (Independent)	Francis McCarry (Sinn Féin)	Michael O'Cleary (SDLP)	Gardiner Kane (DUP)	Robert McPherson (UUP)

== 2011 election ==
2005: 2 x Sinn Féin, 1 x SDLP, 1 x UUP, 1 x Independent

2011: 2 x Independent, 1 x Sinn Féin, 1 x SDLP, 1 x UUP

2005-2011 change: Independent gain from Sinn Féin

Ballycastle - 5 seats
Party	Candidate	FPv%	Count				
Party	Candidate	FPv%	1	2	3	4	5
Independent	Padraig McShane	23.01%	535				
Sinn Féin	Cara McShane*	17.42%	405				
SDLP	Donal Cunningham	16.99%	395				
UUP	Joan Baird	11.61%	270	272.04	290.38	290.62	388.62
Independent	Seamus Blaney*	8.90%	207	271.26	293.32	296.72	347.84
Independent	Kevin McAuley	9.89%	230	259.24	279.26	281.38	317.56
DUP	Christina McFaul	5.55%	129	130.02	140.02	140.1	
Sinn Féin	Paul Hamilton	3.57%	83	124.14	125.48	134	
Independent	Helen Harding*	3.05%	71	79.84			
Electorate: 4,282 Valid: 2,325 (54.30%) Spoilt: 38 Quota: 388 Turnout: 2,363 (55.18%)

== 2005 election ==
2001: 2 x SDLP, 1 x UUP, 1 x DUP, 1 x Independent

2005: 2 x Sinn Féin, 1 x SDLP, 1 x UUP, 1 x Independent

2001-2005 change: Sinn Féin (two seats) gain from SDLP and DUP

Ballycastle - 5 seats
Party	Candidate	FPv%	Count					
Party	Candidate	FPv%	1	2	3	4	5	6
Sinn Féin	Cara McShane	22.76%	545					
Sinn Féin	Cathal Newcombe	12.23%	293	405.86				
SDLP	Madeline Black*	15.49%	371	379.1	380.1	381.66	590.66	
Independent	Seamus Blaney*	12.61%	302	321.98	322.98	325.46	357.13	460.13
UUP	Helen Harding*	13.49%	323	323.81	336.81	337.13	355.46	398.46
DUP	Ian Chestnutt	7.14%	171	171.27	274.27	274.27	275.27	279.27
SDLP	Michael Molloy*	11.06%	265	267.7	268.7	270.06		
DUP	Christina McFaul	5.22%	125	125				
Electorate: 4,142 Valid: 2,395 (57.82%) Spoilt: 44 Quota: 400 Turnout: 2,439 (58.88%)

== 2001 election ==
1997: 2 x Independent, 1 x SDLP, 1 x UUP, 1 x DUP

2001: 2 x SDLP, 1 x UUP, 1 x DUP, 1 x Independent

1997-2001 change: SDLP gain from Independent

Ballycastle - 5 seats
Party	Candidate	FPv%	Count						
Party	Candidate	FPv%	1	2	3	4	5	6	7
SDLP	Madeline Black	17.63%	429						
SDLP	Michael Molloy	14.67%	357	365	379.25	441.25			
UUP	Helen Harding*	15.57%	379	382	383.3	409.3			
Independent	Seamus Blaney*	12.61%	197	204	206.55	238.8	258.8	375.5	376.65
DUP	Gardiner Kane*	14.17%	345	345	345.05	355.05	357.05	363.05	365.12
Sinn Féin	Charlie Neill	12.16%	296	298	298.8	317.85	320.85	362.95	362.95
Independent	Liam McBride	8.30%	202	213	214.2	240.3	246.3		
Independent	Christopher McCaughan*	7.76%	189	195	195.95				
Independent	Anna Edwards	1.64%	40						
Electorate: 4,112 Valid: 2,434 (59.19%) Spoilt: 88 Quota: 406 Turnout: 2,522 (61.33%)

== 1997 election ==
1993: 2 x Independent, 1 x SDLP, 1 x DUP, 1 x UUP

1997: 2 x Independent, 1 x SDLP, 1 x DUP, 1 x UUP

1993-1997 change: No change

Ballycastle - 5 seats
Party	Candidate	FPv%	Count		
Party	Candidate	FPv%	1	2	3
Independent	Seamus Blaney*	28.88%	551		
SDLP	Richard Kerr*	25.31%	483		
DUP	Gardiner Kane*	18.66%	356		
Independent	Christopher McCaughan*	11.58%	221	418.88	
UUP	Helen Harding*	14.83%	283	311.05	439.05
DUP	Elizabeth Brennan	0.73%	14	16.04	25.04
Electorate: 3,770 Valid: 1,908 (50.61%) Spoilt: 36 Quota: 319 Turnout: 1,944 (51.56%)

== 1993 election ==
1989: 2 x Independent, 1 x SDLP, 1 x DUP, 1 x UUP

1993: 2 x Independent, 1 x SDLP, 1 x DUP, 1 x UUP

1989-1993 change: No change

Ballycastle - 5 seats
Party	Candidate	FPv%	Count						
Party	Candidate	FPv%	1	2	3	4	5	6	7
DUP	Gardiner Kane*	22.61%	499						
Independent	Christopher McCaughan	17.26%	381						
SDLP	Richard Kerr	14.18%	313	313.28	314.56	316.24	328.09	394.09	
Independent	Seamus Blaney	13.41%	296	296.56	297.56	300.56	333.11	355.69	460.69
UUP	Helen Harding	8.88%	196	310.52	317.48	318.38	337	338.06	338.09
SDLP	Anna Edwards	6.80%	150	151.12	153.12	154.32	161.56	180.89	202.92
Sinn Féin	Paul Little	6.84%	151	151.28	151.28	151.43	152.46	153.46	
SDLP	Michael O'Cleary*	5.26%	116	116.28	116.28	117.18	133.69		
Independent	Archibald McAuley*	4.26%	94	102.68	106.08	108.63			
Independent	Elizabeth McConaghy	0.50%	11	16.04					
Electorate: 3,621 Valid: 2,207 (60.95%) Spoilt: 41 Quota: 368 Turnout: 2,248 (62.08%)

== 1989 election ==
1985: 1 x SDLP, 1 x DUP, 1 x UUP, 1 x Sinn Féin, 1 x Independent

1989: 2 x Independent, 1 x SDLP, 1 x DUP, 1 x UUP

1985-1989 change: Independent gain from Sinn Féin

Ballycastle - 5 seats
Party	Candidate	FPv%	Count				
Party	Candidate	FPv%	1	2	3	4	5
DUP	Gardiner Kane*	20.52%	385				
SDLP	Michael O'Cleary*	20.20%	379				
Independent	Archibald McAuley	11.62%	218	221.2	232.2	251.96	318.96
Independent	James McShane*	10.77%	202	202.2	233.2	251.82	300.77
UUP	Robert McPherson*	11.62%	218	284.2	285.2	285.2	297.39
Independent	Seamus Blaney	11.78%	221	221.4	231.4	242.61	273.6
Independent	Christopher McCaughan	8.53%	160	161.2	177.2	191.64	
SDLP	Noel McCurdy	4.96%	93	93.6			
Electorate: 3,489 Valid: 1,876 (53.77%) Spoilt: 50 Quota: 313 Turnout: 1,926 (55.20%)

== 1985 election ==
1985: 1 x SDLP, 1 x DUP, 1 x UUP, 1 x Sinn Féin, 1 x Independent

Ballycastle - 5 seats
Party	Candidate	FPv%	Count					
Party	Candidate	FPv%	1	2	3	4	5	6
DUP	Gardiner Kane	26.24%	524					
UUP	Robert McPherson	12.77%	255	434.82				
SDLP	Michael O'Cleary*	16.37%	327	327.74	331.07	366.07		
Sinn Féin	Francis McCarry	13.82%	276	276.37	276.37	285.37	285.37	316.07
Independent	James McShane*	10.92%	218	219.11	223.55	228.55	230.43	288.24
Independent	Archibald McAuley*	7.71%	154	158.81	210.98	218.35	219.29	281.35
SDLP	Richard Kerr*	7.41%	148	149.48	152.81	188.18	218.26	
SDLP	Noel McCurdy	4.76%	95	95.37	96.48			
Electorate: 3,235 Valid: 1,997 (61.73%) Spoilt: 48 Quota: 333 Turnout: 2,045 (63.21%)
