= The Glens (District Electoral Area) =

District electoral area in Northern Ireland

- Causeway Coast and Glens Borough Council DEA constituency

Current constituency
- Created: 1985
- Seats: 5 (1985-)
- Councillors: Bill Kennedy (DUP); Margaret Anne McKillop (Aontú); Oliver McMullan (SF); Cara McShane (SF); Maighréad Watson (SF)

The Glens DEA within Causeway Coast and Glens

The Glens DEA (1993–2014) within Moyle

The Glens is one of the seven district electoral areas (DEA) in Causeway Coast and Glens, Northern Ireland. The district elects five members to Causeway Coast and Glens Borough Council and contains the wards of Ballycastle, Kinbane, Loughguile and Stranocum, Lurigethan and Torr Head and Rathlin. The Glens forms part of the North Antrim constituencies for the Northern Ireland Assembly and UK Parliament and part of the East Antrim constituencies for the Northern Ireland Assembly and UK Parliament.

It was created for the 1985 local elections, replacing Moyle Area A which had existed since 1973, where it originally contained five wards (Armoy, Glenaan, Glenariff, Glendun and Glenshesk). For the 2014 local elections it also gained most of the abolished Ballycastle DEA and parts of the abolished Bushvale DEA.

== Councillors ==
Election	Councillor (Party)	Councillor (Party)	Councillor (Party)	Councillor (Party)	Councillor (Party)
October 2025 Defection	Margaret Anne McKillop (Sinn Féin)/ (SDLP)/ (Independent)	Cara McShane (Sinn Féin)	Oliver McMullan (Sinn Féin)	Mairghéad Watson (Sinn Féin)	Bill Kennedy (DUP)
2023	Margaret Anne McKillop (Sinn Féin)/ (SDLP)/ (Independent)	Cara McShane (Sinn Féin)	Oliver McMullan (Sinn Féin)	Mairghéad Watson (Sinn Féin)	Bill Kennedy (DUP)
October 2019 Co-Option	Margaret Anne McKillop (Sinn Féin)/ (SDLP)/ (Independent)	Cara McShane (Sinn Féin)	Oliver McMullan (Sinn Féin)	Padraig McShane (Independent)	Joan Baird (UUP)
2019	Margaret Anne McKillop (Sinn Féin)/ (SDLP)/ (Independent)	Cara McShane (Sinn Féin)	Oliver McMullan (Sinn Féin)	Ambrose Laverty (Independent)	Joan Baird (UUP)
2014	Margaret Anne McKillop (Sinn Féin)/ (SDLP)/ (Independent)	Cara McShane (Sinn Féin)	Kieran Mulholland (Sinn Féin)	Padraig McShane (Independent)	Joan Baird (UUP)
2011	Margaret Anne McKillop (Sinn Féin)/ (SDLP)/ (Independent)	Noreen McAllister (Sinn Féin)	Catherine McCambridge (SDLP)	Colum Thompson (Independent)	Randal McDonnell (Independent Nationalist)
2005	Oliver McMullan (Sinn Féin)/ (Independent Republican)	Marie McKeegan (Sinn Féin)	Catherine McCambridge (SDLP)	Orla Black (SDLP)	Randal McDonnell (Independent Nationalist)
2001	Oliver McMullan (Sinn Féin)/ (Independent Republican)	Monica Digney (Sinn Féin)	Catherine McCambridge (SDLP)	Christine Blaney (SDLP)	Randal McDonnell (Independent Nationalist)
1997	Oliver McMullan (Sinn Féin)/ (Independent Republican)	James McCarry (Sinn Féin)	Malachy McSparran (SDLP)	Archie McIntosh (SDLP)	Randal McDonnell (Independent Nationalist)
1993	Oliver McMullan (Sinn Féin)/ (Independent Republican)	James McCarry (Sinn Féin)	Malachy McSparran (SDLP)	Patrick McBride (SDLP)	Randal McDonnell (Independent Nationalist)
1989	Joseph Mitchell (SDLP)	James McCarry (Sinn Féin)	Malachy McSparran (SDLP)	Patrick McBride (SDLP)	Randal McDonnell (Independent Nationalist)
1985	John Regan (Sinn Féin)	Daniel Anderson (SDLP)	Malachy McSparran (SDLP)	Patrick McBride (SDLP)	Randal McDonnell (Independent Nationalist)

== 2023 Election ==
2019: 2 x Sinn Féin, 1 x SDLP, 1 x UUP, 1 x Independent

2023: 3 x Sinn Féin, 1 x SDLP, 1 x DUP

2019–2023 Change: Sinn Féin and DUP gain from UUP and Independent

The Glens - 5 seats
Party	Candidate	FPv%	Count					
Party	Candidate	FPv%	1	2	3	4	5	6
Sinn Féin	Cara McShane*	24.85%	1,913					
Sinn Féin	Oliver McMullan*	18.99%	1,462					
Sinn Féin	Mairghéad Watson	14.83%	1,142	1,578.92				
DUP	Bill Kennedy	12.27%	945	947.31	949.29	953.62	1,384.62	
SDLP	Margaret Anne McKillop* ‡	8.47%	652	755.29	922.93	1,102.92	1,135.58	1,273.90
Alliance	Glenise Morgan	9.52%	733	789.10	848.17	898.05	982.03	1,016.99
UUP	Wesley Craig	7.62%	587	590.30	590.63	597.96		
Aontú	John Robbin	3.44%	265	285.46	335.62			
Electorate: 13,178 Valid: 7,699 (58.42%) Spoilt: 100 Quota: 1,284 Turnout: 7,799 (59.18%)

== 2019 Election ==
2014: 2 x Sinn Féin, 1 x SDLP, 1 x UUP, 1 x Independent

2019: 2 x Sinn Féin, 1 x SDLP, 1 x UUP, 1 x Independent

2014-2019 Change: No change

The Glens - 5 seats
Party	Candidate	FPv%	Count					
Party	Candidate	FPv%	1	2	3	4	5	6
Independent	Ambrose Laverty †	18.81%	1,267					
Sinn Féin	Cara McShane*	16.36%	1,102	1,433				
Sinn Féin	Oliver McMullan	16.29%	1,097	1,298				
SDLP	Margret Anne McKillop*	16.03%	1,080	1,122	1,311			
UUP	Joan Baird*	11.25%	758	762	763	793	815	933.3
DUP	Bill Kennedy	12.51%	843	845	850	859	864	887.1
Sinn Féin	Kieran James Mulholland*	8.74%	589					
Electorate: 12,507 Valid: 6,736 (53.85%) Spoilt: 76 Quota: 1,123 Turnout: 6,812 (54.46%)

== 2014 Election ==
2011: 2 x Sinn Féin, 2 x Independent, 1 x SDLP

2014: 2 x Sinn Féin, 1 x SDLP, 1 x UUP, 1 x Independent

2011-2014 Change: UUP gain from Independent

The Glens - 5 seats
Party	Candidate	FPv%	Count							
Party	Candidate	FPv%	1	2	3	4	5	6	7	8
UUP	Joan Baird*	10.41%	675	700	813	842	1,268			
Sinn Féin	Cara McShane*	12.93%	839	846	856	957	958	958	1,273	
SDLP	Margaret Anne McKillop*	8.56%	555	563	616	831	841	866	1,064	1,091.3
Independent	Padraig McShane*	12.87%	835	845	852	919	921	926	1,008	1,023.6
Sinn Féin	Kieran Mulholland	11.48%	745	747	773	780	782	782	864	1,008.3
Independent	Ambrose Laverty	9.67%	627	654	664	798	824	886	904	907.25
Sinn Féin	Colum Thompson*	10.82%	702	702	702	706	706	706		
DUP	Evelyne Robinson*	7.62%	494	497	589	592				
SDLP	Donal Cunningham*	7.91%	513	534	580					
TUV	Cyril Quigg	3.53%	229	231						
SDLP	Joanne McKeown	2.20%	143	147						
Alliance	Colin Mayrs	2.00%	130							
Electorate: 12,011 Valid: 6,487 (54.01%) Spoilt: 63 Quota: 1,082 Turnout: 6,550 (54.53%)

== 2011 Election ==
2005: 2 x Sinn Féin, 2 x SDLP, 1 x Independent

2011: 2 x Sinn Féin, 2 x Independent, 1 x SDLP

2005-2011 Change: Independent gain from SDLP

The Glens - 5 seats
Party	Candidate	FPv%	Count				
Party	Candidate	FPv%	1	2	3	4	5
Independent	Colum Thompson	18.61%	466				
Sinn Féin	Margaret Anne McKillop	13.18%	330	331	349.7	510.7	
Sinn Féin	Noreen McAllister	11.86%	297	304	308.4	338.2	413.8
SDLP	Catherine McCambridge*	12.78%	320	353	354.9	390.1	400.9
Independent	Randal McDonnell*	12.74%	319	338	346.3	369.6	371.4
SDLP	Justin McCamphill	12.82%	321	324	331.7	341.4	345
Sinn Féin	Kieran Mulholland	10.62%	266	267	269.8		
DUP	Walter Greer	7.39%	185				
Electorate: 4,332 Valid: 2,504 (57.80%) Spoilt: 42 Quota: 418 Turnout: 2,546 (58.77%)

== 2005 Election ==
2001: 2 x SDLP, 2 x Independent, 1 x Sinn Féin

2005: 2 x Sinn Féin, 2 x SDLP, 1 x Independent

2001-2005 Change: Independent joins Sinn Féin

The Glens - 5 seats
Party	Candidate	FPv%	Count		
Party	Candidate	FPv%	1	2	3
Sinn Féin	Oliver McMullan*	26.43%	682		
SDLP	Orla Black	16.94%	437		
Sinn Féin	Marie McKeegan	12.21%	315	441.17	
Independent	Randal McDonnell*	15.62%	403	432.23	
SDLP	Catherine McCambridge*	12.44%	321	342.46	405.83
Sinn Féin	Maria O'Hara	8.57%	221	289.82	290.82
DUP	Walter Greer	7.79%	201	201.37	
Electorate: 4,069 Valid: 2,580 (63.41%) Spoilt: 43 Quota: 431 Turnout: 2,623 (64.46%)

== 2001 Election ==
1997: 2 x SDLP, 2 x Independent Nationalist, 1 x Sinn Féin

2001: 2 x Sinn Féin, 2 x SDLP, 1 x Independent

1997-2001 Change: Independent Nationalists (two seats) become Independents

The Glens - 5 seats
Party	Candidate	FPv%	Count					
Party	Candidate	FPv%	1	2	3	4	5	6
Independent	Oliver McMullan*	24.40%	671					
SDLP	Catherine McCambridge	12.65%	348	359.55	365.55	387.21	458.16	468.16
Independent	Randal McDonnell*	11.49%	316	371.77	381.77	395.08	452.32	464.32
SDLP	Christine Blaney	10.22%	281	327.53	333.86	343.51	390.11	393.11
Sinn Féin	Monica Digney	7.85%	216	241.41	241.41	360.61	374.91	374.91
Independent	James McCarry*	10.15%	279	300.45	302.45	317.77	337.07	341.07
DUP	Evelyne Robinson	7.05%	194	194	231	232	232	
SDLP	Archie McIntosh*	6.91%	190	218.71	219.71	226.03		
Sinn Féin	Anne McAuley	6.47%	178	199.78	200.78			
Independent	James McAuley	2.80%	77	77.66				
Electorate: 4,037 Valid: 2,750 (68.12%) Spoilt: 52 Quota: 459 Turnout: 2,802 (69.41%)

== 1997 Election ==
1993: 2 x SDLP, 1 x Sinn Féin, 1 x Independent Republican, 1 x Independent Nationalist
1997: 2 x SDLP, 1 x Sinn Féin, 1 x Independent Republican, 1 x Independent Nationalist
1993-1997 Change: No change

The Glens - 5 seats
Party	Candidate	FPv%	Count				
Party	Candidate	FPv%	1	2	3	4	5
Ind. Republican	Oliver McMullan*	28.58%	711				
Sinn Féin	James McCarry*	18.25%	454				
SDLP	Malachy McSparran*	16.24%	404	488.15			
SDLP	Archie McIntosh	10.22%	316	392.05	419.05		
Ind. Nationalist	Randal McDonnell*	8.96%	223	331	364.3	383.22	464.22
DUP	Thomas Brennan	8.76%	218	219.35	220.7	220.81	222.81
SDLP	Anna Edwards	6.51%	162	182.25	188.1	205.15	
Electorate: 4,032 Valid: 2,488 (61.71%) Spoilt: 32 Quota: 415 Turnout: 2,520 (62.50%)

== 1993 Election ==
1989: 3 x SDLP, 1 x Sinn Féin, 1 x Independent Nationalist

1993: 2 x SDLP, 1 x Sinn Féin, 1 x Independent Nationalist, 1 x Independent Republican

1989-1993 Change: Independent Republican gain from SDLP

The Glens - 5 seats
Party	Candidate	FPv%	Count			
Party	Candidate	FPv%	1	2	3	4
Ind. Republican	Oliver McMullan	20.61%	538			
SDLP	Malachy McSparran*	19.49%	509			
Ind. Nationalist	Randal McDonnell*	13.02%	340	380.11	413.41	452.41
Sinn Féin	James McCarry*	15.20%	397	429.34	433.09	433.51
SDLP	Patrick McBride*	13.75%	359	363.41	373.01	400.16
SDLP	Joseph Mitchell*	9.50%	248	270.47	294.62	294.83
DUP	Elizabeth Brennan	8.43%	220	221.26	221.41	
Electorate: 3,787 Valid: 2,611 (68.95%) Spoilt: 42 Quota: 436 Turnout: 2,653 (70.06%)

== 1989 Election ==
1985: 3 x SDLP, 1 x Sinn Féin, 1 x Independent Nationalist

1989: 3 x SDLP, 1 x Sinn Féin, 1 x Independent Nationalist

1985-1989 Change: No change

The Glens - 5 seats
Party	Candidate	FPv%	Count			
Party	Candidate	FPv%	1	2	3	4
SDLP	Malachy McSparran*	20.08%	468			
Ind. Nationalist	Randal McDonnell*	12.74%	297	321.14	389.41	
SDLP	Joseph Mitchell	12.18%	284	296.92	321.77	420.77
SDLP	Patrick McBride*	14.76%	344	349.95	355.14	397.14
Sinn Féin	James McCarry	14.20%	331	333.72	358.4	389.29
DUP	Elizabeth White	10.77%	251	251.17	253.34	255.36
SDLP	Daniel Anderson*	8.07%	188	207.04	244.1	
Independent	Michael Brogan	7.21%	168	180.58		
Electorate: 3,606 Valid: 2,331 (64.64%) Spoilt: 29 Quota: 389 Turnout: 2,360 (65.45%)

== 1985 Election ==
1985: 3 x SDLP, 1 x Sinn Féin, 1 x Independent Nationalist

The Glens - 5 seats
Party	Candidate	FPv%	Count						
Party	Candidate	FPv%	1	2	3	4	5	6	7
Sinn Féin	John Regan	12.41%	301	321	327	327	441		
SDLP	Malachy McSparran*	14.14%	343	346	351	367	375	391	396
SDLP	Patrick McBride*	10.43%	253	253	260	326	354	373	385
SDLP	Daniel Anderson	13.24%	321	338	340	353	356	365	366
Ind. Nationalist	Randal McDonnell	11.18%	271	292	295	305	317	349	359
SDLP	Dermot McMullan	13.57%	329	336	337	343	349	349	351
UUP	Hugh Acheson*	8.78%	213	213	213	214	215		
Sinn Féin	James McCarry	4.87%	118	118	172	185			
SDLP	Mary Hegarty	5.07%	123	124	127				
Sinn Féin	James McMullan	3.38%	82	83					
Irish Independence	John McKay	2.93%	71						
Electorate: 3,408 Valid: 2,425 (71.16%) Spoilt: 47 Quota: 405 Turnout: 2,472 (72.54%)
