= Gardiner Kane =

Member of the Northern Ireland Assembly for Antrim North
- In office 25 June 1998 – 26 November 2003
- Preceded by: New Creation
- Succeeded by: Philip McGuigan

Member of Moyle District Council
- In office 15 May 1985 – November 2002
- Preceded by: District created
- Succeeded by: Cara McShane
- Constituency: Ballycastle

Personal details
- Born: 25 November 1947 (age 78) Ballymoney, Northern Ireland
- Party: Democratic Unionist Party (1985-2002)
- Other political affiliations: Independent Unionist (2002-2003)

Andrew Gardiner Kane, known as Gardiner Kane (born 25 November 1947) is a former Northern Irish Unionist politician who was a Member of the Northern Ireland Assembly (MLA) for North Antrim from 1998 to 2003. Initially a member of the Democratic Unionist Party (DUP), he was a Moyle Councillor for the Ballycastle DEA from 1985 until his resignation in 2002.

== Background ==
Born in Ballymoney, Kane joined the Royal Ulster Constabulary Reserve in 1974 and served until 1984. He joined the DUP, and was elected to Moyle District Council in 1985, serving as its Chair in 1990 and 1996. In 1996 he was an unsuccessful candidate in the Northern Ireland Forum election in North Antrim. He was elected to the Northern Ireland Assembly, representing North Antrim at the 1998 election.

Kane was accused of indecently assaulting a former council worker in October 2002. He left the DUP soon afterwards, citing ill health, and stood down from his council seat soon afterwards, prompting a by-election. Kane contested the 2003 Assembly election as an independent, but took only 623 votes and was not elected.

In 2004, Kane was cleared of the sexual assault charge, but was convicted of common assault.

Gardiner Kane is an active member of the all Loyal Orders, namely the Orange Order, Apprentice Boys of Derry, and Royal Black Institution

Northern Ireland Assembly
New assembly	MLA for Antrim North; 1998–2003	Succeeded by Philip McGuigan
