= Oliver McMullan =

Irish Sinn Féin politician

Oliver McMullan Cllr
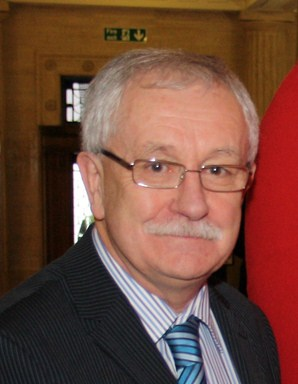

Member of Causeway Coast and Glens Borough Council
- Incumbent
- Assumed office 2 May 2019
- Preceded by: Kieran Mulholland
- Constituency: The Glens

Member of the Northern Ireland Assembly for East Antrim
- In office 5 May 2011 – 30 January 2017
- Preceded by: Ken Robinson
- Succeeded by: John Stewart

Member of Larne Borough Council
- In office 5 May 2011 – 21 November 2011
- Preceded by: Danny O'Connor
- Succeeded by: James McKeown
- Constituency: Coast Road

Member of Moyle District Council
- In office 19 May 1993 – 5 May 2011
- Preceded by: Joseph Mitchell
- Succeeded by: Margaret McKillop
- Constituency: The Glens

Personal details
- Born: 22 March 1952 (age 74) Cushendall, County Antrim, Northern Ireland
- Party: Sinn Féin (2003 - present)
- Other political affiliations: Independent (1993 - 2003)
- Website: Oliver McMullan MLA

Oliver McMullan (born 22 March 1952) is an Irish Sinn Féin politician, serving as a Causeway Coast and Glens councillor for The Glens DEA since 2019. He was a Member of the Legislative Assembly (MLA) for East Antrim from 2011 to 2017. He was also a Larne Borough Councillor, between May and November 2011.

== Career ==
McMullan was active in business life in his native Cushendall, where he owned a local pub. He entered politics in 1993, when he was elected as an Independent to Moyle District Council, topping the poll. He also topped the poll in the same elections in 1997 and 2001, standing as either an independent or Independent Nationalist.

McMullan headed the Independent McMullan list in the 1996 elections to the Northern Ireland Forum. He received 670 votes (2%) in North Antrim, with the list receiving 927 votes (0.12%) across Northern Ireland, meaning that no candidates were elected. McMullan failed to be elected in the same constituency in the 1998 elections, where he polled 1.0%.

He joined Sinn Féin before the 2003 Assembly elections and stood unsuccessfully for the party in East Antrim in those elections and the 2007 Assembly elections. He was re-elected to Moyle District Council in 2005, serving as the first Sinn Féin chairman of the council and a board member on the North Eastern Education and Library Board. He was also a member of Sinn Féin's All Ireland Advisory Committees for Agriculture, Tourism and Rural Development.

He unsuccessfully ran in East Antrim at the 2010 general election, finishing fourth, with 2,064 votes (6.8%)

After 18 years as a member of Moyle Council, McMullan contested and won a seat on Larne Borough Council in May 2011, standing in and topping the poll in the Coast Road electoral area. He was also elected to the Assembly for East Antrim that same day. In doing so, he became the first Sinn Féin councilor on the predominantly unionist council. In November 2011, he resigned from the council, enabling fellow Sinn Féin member James McKeown to take his place.

Just over a week after gaining election, he received a death threat from a group claiming to be called the 'Loyalist Action Force'.

McMullan spoke about a family that had been the target of several racist attacks in Glenarm, saying, "There has been a petrol bomb thrown at the house and there has been another occasion when acid was poured over their vehicle."

In 2013, he revealed he was suffering from prostate cancer.

McMullan re-contested East Antrim at the 2015 general election, where he came fifth, with a small increase in his vote by 0.1%.

Standing for re-election in the 2016 Assembly election, he retained his seat with 2,633 votes. He lost his seat at the 2017 Assembly election.

He finished fourth in East Antrim at the June 2017 general election, where his vote share rose by 2.4%.

McMullan returned to local government at the 2019 local elections, being elected as a member of the Causeway Coast and Glens Borough Council for The Glens area.

At the December 2019 general election, his vote dropped by 3.7% to 2,210 votes (5.6%), though still came fourth.

McMullan attempted to regain his former seat at the 2022 Assembly election, where he was eliminated on the fourth count with 3,675 first-preference votes (9.1%).

He was re-elected to the Council at the 2023 election.

McMullan was pushed into fifth place by Matthew Warwick of the Traditional Unionist Voice (TUV) at the 2024 general election, polling 2,986 votes (7.5%).

Northern Ireland Assembly
Preceded by Ken Robinson	MLA for East Antrim; 2011–2017	Seat abolished
