= Moyle District Council =

Former local council in Northern Ireland

Coordinates: 55.171°N 6.229°W

Moyle District
- Area: 480 km^{2} (190 sq mi); Ranked 14th of 26
- District HQ: Ballycastle
- Catholic: 59.6%
- Protestant: 37%
- Country: Northern Ireland
- Sovereign state: United Kingdom
- Website: www.moyle-council.org

Moyle District Council was a local council in County Antrim in the northeast of Northern Ireland. It merged with Ballymoney Borough Council, Coleraine Borough Council and Limavady Borough Council in May 2015 under local government reorganisation to become Causeway Coast and Glens District Council.

As a consequence, in 1991 the local government boundary commission originally recommended that the council should be merged with the neighbouring Ballymoney council to create a new council called "Dalriada". This was strongly opposed by both councils and also by Ballymena which would have gained the Glens of Antrim and a small part of Ballymoney council in the process. After a public enquiry the plans were shelved and Moyle was preserved.

Council headquarters were in Ballycastle.

The council was composed of 15 councillors who were elected from three electoral areas (Ballycastle, Giant's Causeway and The Glens) every four years by a system of proportional representation.

Most of the former district forms the North Antrim constituency (together with the neighbouring former Local Council areas of Ballymena and Ballymoney), for elections to the Westminster Parliament and Northern Ireland Assembly. The exception is the Glens of Antrim area, most of which is part of the East Antrim constituency. The district was a majority Catholic enclave in the otherwise Protestant County Antrim.

== Elections ==
Map of the district's DEAs from 1993 to 2014

=== 2005 Election results ===
Party		seats	change +/-
•	Sinn Féin	4	+3
•	Social Democratic and Labour Party	3	-1
•	Ulster Unionist Party	3	=
•	Democratic Unionist Party	2	-1
•	Independent	3	-1

=== 2011 Election results ===
Party		seats	change +/-
•	Sinn Féin	3	-1
•	Social Democratic and Labour Party	2	-1
•	Ulster Unionist Party	3	=
•	Democratic Unionist Party	2	=
•	Traditional Unionist Voice	1	+1
•	Independent	4	+1

An Independent elected in the 2011 elections joined Sinn Féin in May 2012.

== Review of Public Administration ==
Under the Review of Public Administration (RPA) the council was due to merge with Coleraine Borough Council, Limavady Borough Council and Ballymoney Borough Council in 2011 to form Causeway Coast and Glens District, a single council for the enlarged area totalling 1,796 km^{2} (693 sq mi) and a population of 131,564. The next election was due to take place in May 2009, but on 25 April 2008, Shaun Woodward, Secretary of State for Northern Ireland announced that the scheduled 2009 district council elections were to be postponed until 2011. The merger with Coleraine, Limavady and Ballymoney councils was confirmed in September 2011 and took effect in 2015.

== Population ==
The area covered by Moyle District Council had a population of 17,050 residents according to the 2011 Northern Ireland census.

== See also ==
- Local government in Northern Ireland
- Knocknacarry
