= 2001 Limavady Borough Council election =

Local government election in Northern Ireland

← 1997	7 June 2001	2005 →

All 15 seats to Limavady Borough Council 8 seats needed for a majority
	First party	Second party	Third party
Party	SDLP	Sinn Féin	UUP
Seats won	4	4	3
Seat change	▼3	▲3	▼3
	Fourth party	Fifth party	Sixth party
Party	DUP	United Unionist	Independent
Seats won	2	1	1
Seat change	▲1	▲1	▲1
- Party with the most votes by district.

Elections to Limavady Borough Council were held on 7 June 2001 on the same day as the other Northern Irish local government elections. The election used three district electoral areas to elect a total of 15 councillors.

== Election results ==
Limavady Borough Council Election Result 2001
Party	Seats	Gains	Losses	Net gain/loss	Seats %	Votes %	Votes	+/−
SDLP	4	0	3	▼3	26.7	28.8	4,379	▼11.5
Sinn Féin	4	3	0	▲3	26.7	24.9	3,784	▲15.4
UUP	3	0	3	▼3	20.0	15.4	2,344	▼23.1
DUP	2	1	0	▲1	13.3	17.8	2,716	▲6.7
United Unionist Assembly Party	1	1	0	▲1	6.7	8.9	1,351	New
Independent	1	1	0	▲1	6.7	4.2	642	▲4.2

Note: "Votes" are the first preference votes.

== Districts summary ==
Results of the Limavady Borough Council election, 2001 by district
Ward	%	Cllrs	%	Cllrs	%	Cllrs	%	Cllrs	%	Cllrs	Total Cllrs
Ward	SDLP		Sinn Féin		UUP		DUP		Others		Total Cllrs
Bellarena	41.2	2	15.3	1	24.7	1	18.8	1	0.0	0	5
Benbradagh	21.0	1	50.3	3	0.0	0	5.1	0	23.6	1	5
Limavady Town	22.7	1	8.9	0	21.1	2	30.3	1	17.0	1	5
Total	28.8	4	24.9	4	15.4	3	17.8	2	13.1	2	15

== District results ==
=== Bellarena ===
1997: 3 x SDLP, 2 x UUP
2001: 2 x SDLP, 1 x UUP, 1 x DUP, 1 x Sinn Féin
1997-2001 Change: DUP and Sinn Féin gain from UUP and SDLP

Bellarena - 5 seats
Party	Candidate	FPv%	Count			
Party	Candidate	FPv%	1	2	3	4
DUP	Leslie Cubitt	18.81%	1,027			
SDLP	Michael Carten*	15.48%	845	846.44	1,200.44	
SDLP	Gerry Mullan	13.21%	721	721	918	
Sinn Féin	Martin McGuigan	15.26%	833	833	917	
UUP	Edwin Stevenson	12.95%	707	759.44	760.44	765.44
UUP	William Smyth	11.74%	641	703.88	709	724
SDLP	John McKinney*	12.55%	685	685.24		
Electorate: 7,656 Valid: 5,459 (71.30%) Spoilt: 68 Quota: 910 Turnout: 5,527 (72.19%)

=== Benbradagh ===
1997: 2 x UUP, 2 x SDLP, 1 x Sinn Féin
2001: 3 x Sinn Féin, 1 x United Unionist, 1 x SDLP
1997-2001 Change: Sinn Féin (two seats) gain from UUP and SDLP, United Unionist leaves UUP

Benbradagh - 5 seats
Party	Candidate	FPv%	Count					
Party	Candidate	FPv%	1	2	3	4	5	6
Sinn Féin	Anne Brolly	20.96%	1,056					
Sinn Féin	Francis Brolly	18.21%	917					
United Unionist	Boyd Douglas*	14.85%	748	748.42	918.42			
SDLP	Michael Coyle*	11.10%	559	584.41	587.41	587.41	600.46	978.46
Sinn Féin	Marion Donaghy	11.10%	559	732.67	732.67	732.67	793.42	841.2
United Unionist	Mark Gibson	8.78%	442	442	508	585.28	585.28	588.28
SDLP	Gerard Lynch*	9.87%	497	509.39	512.39	512.85	515.73	
DUP	John Murray	5.14%	259	259				
Electorate: 6,750 Valid: 5,037 (74.62%) Spoilt: 112 Quota: 840 Turnout: 5,149 (76.28%)

=== Limavady Town ===
1997: 2 x UUP, 2 x SDLP, 1 x DUP
2001: 2 x UUP, 1 x DUP, 1 x SDLP, 1 x Independent
1997-2001 Change: Independent gain from SDLP

Limavady Town - 5 seats
Party	Candidate	FPv%	Count				
Party	Candidate	FPv%	1	2	3	4	5
DUP	George Robinson*	30.30%	1,430				
UUP	John Dolan*	8.11%	383	592.76	703.62	819.74	
UUP	John Rankin	7.88%	372	502.64	681.8	816.88	
Independent	Brian Brown	13.60%	642	704.1	713.86	768.18	793.18
SDLP	Desmond Lowry*	11.48%	542	544.76	544.76	545.22	784.68
SDLP	John Kerr	11.23%	530	532.76	532.76	533.76	627.76
Sinn Féin	Malachy O'Kane*	8.88%	419	419.92	419.92	419.92	
United Unionist	Alister Smyth	3.41%	161	316.02	322.32		
UUP	Raymond Kennedy	5.11%	241	309.08			
Electorate: 6,877 Valid: 4,720 (68.63%) Spoilt: 59 Quota: 787 Turnout: 4,779 (69.49%)
