= 2005 Limavady Borough Council election =

Local government election in Northern Ireland

← 2001	5 May 2005	2011 →

All 15 seats to Limavady Borough Council 8 seats needed for a majority
	First party	Second party	Third party
Party	Sinn Féin	DUP	SDLP
Seats won	6	3	3
Seat change	▲2	▲1	▼1
	Fourth party	Fifth party	Sixth party
Party	UUP	United Unionist	Independent
Seats won	2	1	0
Seat change	▼1	0	▼1
- Party with the most votes by district.

Elections to Limavady Borough Council were held on 5 May 2005 on the same day as the other Northern Irish local government elections. The election used three district electoral areas to elect a total of 15 councillors.

== Election results ==
Limavady Borough Council Election Result 2005
Party	Seats	Gains	Losses	Net gain/loss	Seats %	Votes %	Votes	+/−
Sinn Féin	6	2	0	▲2	40.0	31.3	4,130	▲6.4
DUP	3	1	0	▲1	20.0	23.9	3,153	▲6.1
SDLP	3	0	1	▼1	20.0	23.2	3,054	▼5.6
UUP	2	0	1	▼1	13.3	11.5	1,512	▼3.9
United Unionist Coalition	1	0	0	0	6.7	10.1	1,328	▲1.2

Note: "Votes" are the first preference votes.

== Districts summary ==
Results of the Limavady Borough Council election, 2005 by district
Ward	%	Cllrs	%	Cllrs	%	Cllrs	%	Cllrs	%	Cllrs	Total Cllrs
Ward	Sinn Féin		DUP		SDLP		UUP		Others		Total Cllrs
Bellarena	25.3	2	30.0	1	29.6	1	15.1	1	0.0	0	5
Benbradagh	49.8	3	0.0	0	20.1	1	0.0	0	30.1	1	5
Limavady Town	17.6	1	44.1	2	18.1	1	20.2	1	0.0	0	5
Total	31.3	6	23.9	3	23.2	3	11.5	2	10.1	1	15

== District results ==
=== Bellarena ===
2001: 2 x SDLP, 1 x DUP, 1 x UUP, 1 x Sinn Féin
2005: 2 x Sinn Féin, 1 x DUP, 1 x SDLP, 1 x UUP
2001-2005 Change: Sinn Féin gain from SDLP

Bellarena - 5 seats
Party	Candidate	FPv%	Count			
Party	Candidate	FPv%	1	2	3	4
DUP	Leslie Cubitt*	23.65%	1,189			
SDLP	Michael Carten*	12.53%	630	631.8	883.8	
UUP	Edwin Stevenson*	15.10%	759	833.7	839	
Sinn Féin	Gerard Butcher	13.27%	667	667	708	770
Sinn Féin	John McElhinney	11.99%	603	603.3	612.3	743.3
DUP	Arnold Shannon	6.36%	320	586.4	589.7	602.6
SDLP	John McKinney	9.96%	501	502.8	541.4	
SDLP	Deborah Crewe	7.14%	359	360.5		
Electorate: 8,050 Valid: 5,028 (62.46%) Spoilt: 77 Quota: 839 Turnout: 5,105 (63.42%)

=== Benbradagh ===
2001: 3 x Sinn Féin, 1 x United Unionist, 1 x SDLP
2005: 3 x Sinn Féin, 1 x United Unionist, 1 x SDLP
2001-2005 Change: No change

Benbradagh - 5 seats
Party	Candidate	FPv%	Count					
Party	Candidate	FPv%	1	2	3	4	5	6
United Unionist	Boyd Douglas*	20.85%	922					
SDLP	Michael Coyle*	14.36%	635	635.6	833.6			
Sinn Féin	Cathal Hasson	15.06%	666	666	676	699.14	1,038.14	
Sinn Féin	Brenda Chivers	13.82%	611	611.2	631.2	657.9	682.79	851.15
Sinn Féin	Marion Donaghy*	10.95%	484	484.2	502.2	530.68	606.02	737.58
United Unionist	Samuel Oliver	9.18%	406	585	585.6	593.61	593.61	593.61
Sinn Féin	Martin McGuigan	10.00%	442	442.2	442.2	451.1		
SDLP	Evelyn Donaghy	5.79%	256	256.6				
Electorate: 6,956 Valid: 4,422 (63.57%) Spoilt: 97 Quota: 738 Turnout: 4,519 (64.97%)

=== Limavady Town ===
2001: 2 x UUP, 1 x DUP, 1 x SDLP, 1 x Independent
2005: 2 x DUP, 1 x UUP, 1 x Sinn Féin, 1 x SDLP
2001-2005 Change: DUP and Sinn Féin gain from UUP and Independent

Limavady Town - 5 seats
Party	Candidate	FPv%	Count			
Party	Candidate	FPv%	1	2	3	4
DUP	George Robinson*	23.50%	876			
DUP	Alan Robinson	20.61%	768			
Sinn Féin	Anne Brolly*	17.63%	657			
UUP	John Rankin*	12.66%	472	662.35		
SDLP	Gerry Mullan*	11.11%	414	416.48	418.46	661.46
UUP	John Dolan*	7.54%	281	374	511.94	513.94
SDLP	Gareth Peoples	6.95%	259	260.55	262.97	
Electorate: 6,322 Valid: 3,727 (58.95%) Spoilt: 58 Quota: 622 Turnout: 3,785 (59.87%)
