= 1997 Limavady Borough Council election =

Local government election in Northern Ireland

← 1993	21 May 1997	2001 →

All 15 seats to Limavady Borough Council 8 seats needed for a majority
	First party	Second party	Third party
Party	SDLP	UUP	DUP
Seats won	7	6	1
Seat change	0	0	0
	Fourth party
Party	Sinn Féin
Seats won	1
Seat change	0
- Results by district electoral area, shaded by First Preference Votes.

Elections to Limavady Borough Council were held on 21 May 1997 on the same day as the other Northern Irish local government elections. The election used three district electoral areas to elect a total of 15 councillors.

There was no change from the prior election.

== Election results ==
Limavady Borough Council Election Result 1997
Party	Seats	Gains	Losses	Net gain/loss	Seats %	Votes %	Votes	+/−
SDLP	7	0	0	0	46.7	40.3	5,279	0.0
UUP	6	0	0	0	40.0	38.5	5,036	▼1.4
DUP	1	0	0	0	6.7	11.1	1,447	▲0.3
Sinn Féin	1	0	0	0	6.7	9.5	1,244	▲0.5
NI Women's Coalition	0	0	0	0	0.0	0.6	88	New

Note: "Votes" are the first preference votes.

== Districts summary ==
Results of the Limavady Borough Council election, 1997 by district
Ward	%	Cllrs	%	Cllrs	%	Cllrs	%	Cllrs	%	Cllrs	Total Cllrs
Ward	SDLP		UUP		DUP		Sinn Féin		Others		Total Cllrs
Bellarena	53.1	3	36.6	2	10.3	0	0.0	0	0.0	0	5
Benbradagh	34.8	2	35.4	2	0.0	0	29.8	1	0.0	0	5
Limavady Town	33.1	2	43.1	2	21.9	1	0.0	0	1.9	0	5
Total	40.3	7	38.5	6	11.1	1	9.5	1	0.6	0	15

== District results ==
=== Bellarena ===
1993: 3 x SDLP, 2 x UUP
1997: 3 x SDLP, 2 x UUP
1993-1997 Change: No change

Bellarena - 5 seats
Party	Candidate	FPv%	Count		
Party	Candidate	FPv%	1	2	3
UUP	Stanley Gault*	19.14%	839		
SDLP	Michael Carten	18.57%	814		
SDLP	Arthur Doherty*	18.21%	798		
UUP	Robert Grant*	17.45%	765		
SDLP	John McKinney*	16.29%	714	714.7	793.1
DUP	Robert Glass	10.34%	453	556.18	556.48
Electorate: 6,868 Valid: 4,383 (63.82%) Spoilt: 42 Quota: 731 Turnout: 4,425 (64.43%)

=== Benbradagh ===
1993: 2 x UUP, 2 x SDLP, 1 x Sinn Féin
1997: 2 x UUP, 2 x SDLP, 1 x Sinn Féin
1993-1997 Change: No change

Benbradagh - 5 seats
Party	Candidate	FPv%	Count		
Party	Candidate	FPv%	1	2	3
UUP	Boyd Douglas	25.65%	1,072		
SDLP	Michael Coyle*	24.23%	1,013		
Sinn Féin	Malachy O'Kane	20.96%	876		
UUP	Max Gault*	9.78%	409	777.55	
SDLP	Gerard Lynch*	10.57%	442	443.05	739.06
Sinn Féin	Eddie-Jo Lynn	8.80%	368	368	384.5
Electorate: 6,447 Valid: 4,180 (64.84%) Spoilt: 76 Quota: 697 Turnout: 4,256 (66.02%)

=== Limavady Town ===
1993: 2 x UUP, 2 x SDLP, 1 x DUP
1997: 2 x UUP, 2 x SDLP, 1 x DUP
1993-1997 Change: No change

Limavady Town - 5 seats
Party	Candidate	FPv%	Count	
Party	Candidate	FPv%	1	2
DUP	George Robinson*	18.47%	837	
SDLP	Desmond Lowry*	16.75%	759	
UUP	Ronald Cartwright*	16.09%	729	800
UUP	John Dolan*	16.29%	738	782
SDLP	Barry Doherty*	16.31%	739	779
UUP	Norman Reynolds	10.68%	484	549
DUP	Victor Wilson	3.47%	157	
NI Women's Coalition	Paula Taylor	1.94%	88	
Electorate: 7,113 Valid: 4,531 (63.70%) Spoilt: 75 Quota: 756 Turnout: 4,606 (64.75%)
