= Brolly =

Brolly may refer to:

People

- Anne Brolly, Sinn Féin politician and councillor on Limavady Borough Council in Northern Ireland
- Bob Brolly (born 1950), Northern Ireland-born broadcaster and singer
- Brian Brolly (1936–2006), English showbusiness entrepreneur
- Francie Brolly (born 1947), musician, retired teacher and republican politician from Dungiven, Northern Ireland
- Joe Brolly (born 1969), Irish barrister, Gaelic football analyst, and former player from Dungiven, County Londonderry, Northern Ireland
- Mike Brolly (born 1954), Scottish-born former professional footballer
- Sarah Buxton Brolly (born 1965), American actress
- Shane Brolly (born 1970), Northern Irish actor, writer, and director

Other uses

- Umbrella, colloquially
- Brolly, California, in Modoc County

== See also ==
- Brollie, free video streaming service offering Australian movies
- Broly, fictional character in the Dragon Ball series
