= 1993 Limavady Borough Council election =

Local government election in Northern Ireland

← 1989	19 May 1993	1997 →

All 15 seats to Limavady Borough Council 8 seats needed for a majority
	First party	Second party	Third party
Party	SDLP	UUP	DUP
Seats won	7	6	1
Seat change	▲1	▼1	0
	Fourth party
Party	Sinn Féin
Seats won	1
Seat change	0
- Party with the most votes by district.

Elections to Limavady Borough Council were held on 19 May 1993 on the same day as the other Northern Irish local government elections. The election used three district electoral areas to elect a total of 15 councillors.

== Election results ==
Limavady Borough Council Election Result 1993
Party	Seats	Gains	Losses	Net gain/loss	Seats %	Votes %	Votes	+/−
SDLP	7	1	0	▲1	46.7	40.3	5,054	▲3.7
UUP	6	0	1	▼1	40.0	39.9	5,003	0.0
DUP	1	0	0	0	6.7	10.8	1,358	▼1.0
Sinn Féin	1	0	0	0	6.7	9.0	1,129	▼0.6

Note: "Votes" are the first preference votes.

== Districts summary ==
Results of the Limavady Borough Council election, 1993 by district
Ward	%	Cllrs	%	Cllrs	%	Cllrs	%	Cllrs	%	Cllrs	Total Cllrs
Ward	SDLP		UUP		DUP		Sinn Féin		Others		Total Cllrs
Bellarena	53.7	3	36.8	2	9.4	0	0.0	0	0.0	0	5
Benbradagh	33.3	2	37.5	2	0.0	0	29.1	1	0.0	0	5
Limavady Town	34.1	2	44.6	2	21.3	1	0.0	0	0.0	0	5
Total	40.3	7	39.9	6	10.8	1	9.0	1	0.0	0	15

== District results ==
=== Bellarena ===
1989: 3 x SDLP, 2 x UUP
1993: 3 x SDLP, 2 x UUP
1989–1993 Change: No change

Bellarena - 5 seats
Party	Candidate	FPv%	Count		
Party	Candidate	FPv%	1	2	3
UUP	Stanley Gault*	21.42%	880		
SDLP	Arthur Doherty*	20.84%	856		
SDLP	Thomas Mullan*	16.77%	689		
UUP	Robert Grant*	15.43%	634	809.34	
SDLP	John McKinney*	16.09%	661	661	826.48
DUP	Ernest Murray	9.44%	388	402.74	405.26
Electorate: 6,221 Valid: 4,108 (66.03%) Spoilt: 75 Quota: 685 Turnout: 4,183 (67.24%)

=== Benbradagh ===
1989: 2 x UUP, 2 x SDLP, 1 x Sinn Féin
1993: 2 x UUP, 2 x SDLP, 1 x Sinn Féin
1989–1993 Change: No change

Benbradagh - 5 seats
Party	Candidate	FPv%	Count				
Party	Candidate	FPv%	1	2	3	4	5
UUP	David Robinson*	26.86%	1,042				
SDLP	Michael Coyle	25.75%	999				
Sinn Féin	Thomas Donaghy*	20.68%	802				
UUP	Max Gault*	10.70%	415	800.32			
SDLP	Gerard Lynch*	7.58%	294	295.14	610.34	614.34	636.38
Sinn Féin	Kevin Kelly	8.43%	327	327.76	364.16	509.16	509.54
Electorate: 6,155 Valid: 3,879 (63.02%) Spoilt: 97 Quota: 647 Turnout: 3,976 (64.60%)

=== Limavady Town ===
1989: 3 x UUP, 1 x SDLP, 1 x DUP
1993: 2 x UUP, 2 x SDLP, 1 x DUP
1989–1993 Change: SDLP gain from UUP

Limavady Town - 5 seats
Party	Candidate	FPv%	Count		
Party	Candidate	FPv%	1	2	3
DUP	George Robinson*	19.40%	884		
SDLP	Barry Doherty*	17.60%	802		
UUP	Ronald Cartwright*	17.34%	790		
UUP	John Dolan*	15.80%	720	771	
SDLP	Desmond Lowry	16.52%	753	755	758.23
UUP	Norman Reynolds*	12.11%	522	548	665.13
DUP	John Murray	1.89%	86		
Electorate: 6,959 Valid: 4,557 (65.48%) Spoilt: 66 Quota: 760 Turnout: 4,623 (66.43%)
