= 2011 Limavady Borough Council election =

Local government election in Northern Ireland

- 5 May 2011

All 15 seats to Limavady Borough Council 8 seats needed for a majority
	First party	Second party	Third party
Party	Sinn Féin	DUP	SDLP
Seats won	6	3	3
Seat change	0	0	0
	Fourth party	Fifth party	Sixth party
Party	UUP	TUV	United Unionist
Seats won	2	1	0
Seat change	0	▲1	▼1
- Party with the most votes by district.

Elections to Limavady Borough Council were held on 5 May 2011 on the same day as the other Northern Irish local government elections. The election used three district electoral areas to elect a total of 15 councillors.

== Election results ==
Limavady Borough Council Election Result 2011
Party	Seats	Gains	Losses	Net gain/loss	Seats %	Votes %	Votes	+/−
Sinn Féin	6	0	0	0	40.0	38.0	4,626	▲6.7
DUP	3	0	0	0	20.0	26.2	3,191	▲2.3
SDLP	3	0	0	0	20.0	14.5	1,770	▼8.7
UUP	2	0	0	0	13.3	9.6	1,169	▼1.9
TUV	1	1	0	▲1	6.7	5.5	669	New
Independent	0	0	0	0	0.0	4.2	508	▲4.2
Alliance	0	0	0	0	0.0	2.0	240	▲2.0

Note: "Votes" are the first preference votes.

== Districts summary ==
Results of the Limavady Borough Council election, 2011 by district
Ward	%	Cllrs	%	Cllrs	%	Cllrs	%	Cllrs	%	Cllrs	%	Cllrs	Total Cllrs
Ward	Sinn Féin		DUP		SDLP		UUP		TUV		Others		Total Cllrs
Bellarena	34.1	2	29.2	1	18.1	1	12.1	1	0.0	0	6.5	0	5
Benbradagh	56.4	3	12.8	0	13.0	1	0.0	0	15.4	1	2.4	1	5
Limavady Town	18.1	1	40.7	2	11.2	1	19.3	1	0.0	0	10.7	0	5
Total	38.0	6	26.2	3	14.5	3	9.6	2	5.5	1	6.2	0	15

== District results ==
=== Bellarena ===
2005: 2 x Sinn Féin, 1 x DUP, 1 x SDLP, 1 x UUP
2011: 2 x Sinn Féin, 1 x DUP, 1 x SDLP, 1 x UUP
2005-2011 Change: No change

Bellarena - 5 seats
Party	Candidate	FPv%	Count				
Party	Candidate	FPv%	1	2	3	4	5
DUP	George Robinson*	22.04%	1,016				
Sinn Féin	Dermot Nicholl	19.87%	944				
SDLP	Orla Beattie	11.85%	563	565.2	584.56	816.56	
Sinn Féin	Cathal McLaughlin	14.19%	674	674.44	786.44	814.44	
UUP	Edwin Stevenson*	12.12%	576	615.6	615.6	620.14	793.14
DUP	Jonathan Holmes	7.81%	371	529.4	529.72	531.94	612.94
Independent	Leslie Cubitt*	6.55%	311	326.84	326.84	333	
SDLP	Oonagh McNickle	6.23%	296	296.44	308.92		
Electorate: 8,808 Valid: 4,751 (53.94%) Spoilt: 99 Quota: 792 Turnout: 4,850 (55.06%)

=== Benbradagh ===
2005: 3 x Sinn Féin, 1 x United Unionist, 1 x SDLP
2011: 3 x Sinn Féin, 1 x TUV, 1 x SDLP
2005-2011 Change: United Unionist joins TUV

Benbradagh - 5 seats
Party	Candidate	FPv%	Count				
Party	Candidate	FPv%	1	2	3	4	5
Sinn Féin	Sean McGlinchey	19.80%	862				
Sinn Féin	Brenda Chivers*	17.83%	776				
Sinn Féin	Tony McCaul	9.65%	420	425	491.72	514.16	819.16
SDLP	Michael Coyle*	13.03%	567	624	633.92	641.42	696.36
TUV	Boyd Douglas*	15.37%	669	679	679.16	679.4	683.94
DUP	Edgar Scott	12.77%	556	568	568.48	568.66	568.66
Sinn Féin	Rory Donaghy	9.10%	396	401	453.16	467.68	
Alliance	Siobhan Carr	2.46%	107				
Electorate: 7,418 Valid: 4,353 (58.68%) Spoilt: 89 Quota: 726 Turnout: 4,442 (59.88%)

=== Limavady Town ===
2005: 2 x DUP, 1 x UUP, 1 x Sinn Féin, 1 x SDLP
2011: 2 x DUP, 1 x UUP, 1 x Sinn Féin, 1 x SDLP
2005-2011 Change: No change

Limavady Town - 5 seats
Party	Candidate	FPv%	Count					
Party	Candidate	FPv%	1	2	3	4	5	6
DUP	Alan Robinson*	29.42%	903					
Sinn Féin	Anne Brolly*	18.05%	554					
DUP	James McCorkell	6.16%	189	349.16	353.48	353.66	367.42	617.98
UUP	John Rankin*	11.27%	346	414.2	429.64	429.73	486.7	503.86
SDLP	Gerry Mullan*	11.21%	344	347.08	386.52	420.99	498.38	503.82
UUP	Aaron Callan	8.05%	247	269.44	286.44	286.62	322.59	331.35
DUP	Jim Quigg	5.08%	156	276.56	281.56	281.92	295.36	
Independent	Brian Brown	6.42%	197	203.6	240.04	245.35		
Alliance	Damien Corr	4.33%	133	136.08				
Electorate: 6,058 Valid: 3,069 (50.66%) Spoilt: 47 Quota: 512 Turnout: 3,116 (51.44%)
