= 1989 Limavady Borough Council election =

Local government election in Northern Ireland

| ← 1985 | 17 May 1989 | 1993 → |

All 15 seats to Limavady Borough Council 8 seats needed for a majority
| | First party | Second party | Third party |
|---|---|---|---|
| Party | UUP | SDLP | DUP |
| Seats won | 7 | 6 | 1 |
| Seat change | 0 | ▲2 | ▼1 |
| | Fourth party |
| Party | Sinn Féin |
| Seats won | 1 |
| Seat change | ▼1 |

Elections to Limavady Borough Council were held on 17 May 1989 on the same day as the other Northern Irish local government elections. The election used three district electoral areas to elect a total of 15 councillors.

== Election results ==
Limavady Borough Council Election Result 1989
| Party | Seats | Gains | Losses | Net gain/loss | Seats % | Votes % | Votes | +/− |
|---|---|---|---|---|---|---|---|---|
| UUP | 7 | 0 | 0 | 0 | 46.7 | 39.9 | 4,695 | ▲0.5 |
| SDLP | 6 | 2 | 0 | ▲2 | 40.0 | 36.6 | 4,312 | ▲3.7 |
| DUP | 1 | 0 | 1 | ▼1 | 6.7 | 11.8 | 1,386 | ▲2.1 |
| Sinn Féin | 1 | 0 | 1 | ▼1 | 6.7 | 9.6 | 1,136 | ▼0.9 |
| Alliance | 0 | 0 | 0 | 0 | 0.0 | 2.1 | 241 | ▲0.2 |

Note: "Votes" are the first preference votes.

== Districts summary ==
Results of the Limavady Borough Council election, 1989 by district
| Ward | % | Cllrs | % | Cllrs | % | Cllrs | % | Cllrs | % | Cllrs | Total Cllrs |
| Ward | UUP | | SDLP | | DUP | | Sinn Féin | | Others | | Total Cllrs |
|---|---|---|---|---|---|---|---|---|---|---|---|
| Bellarena | 36.9 | 2 | 51.5 | 3 | 11.6 | 0 | 0.0 | 0 | 0.0 | 0 | 5 |
| Benbradagh | 37.5 | 2 | 31.7 | 2 | 0.0 | 0 | 30.8 | 1 | 0.0 | 0 | 5 |
| Limavady Town | 45.0 | 3 | 22.7 | 1 | 26.3 | 1 | 0.0 | 0 | 6.0 | 0 | 5 |
| Total | 39.9 | 7 | 36.6 | 6 | 11.8 | 1 | 9.6 | 1 | 2.1 | 0 | 15 |

== District results ==
=== Bellarena ===
1985: 2 x SDLP, 2 x UUP, 1 x DUP
1989: 3 x SDLP, 2 x UUP
1985–1989 Change: SDLP gain from DUP

Bellarena - 5 seats
| Party | Candidate | FPv% | Count | | |
| Party | Candidate | FPv% | 1 | 2 | 3 |
|---|---|---|---|---|---|
| UUP | Stanley Gault* | 19.71% | 797 | | |
| SDLP | John McKinney | 19.42% | 785 | | |
| UUP | Robert Grant* | 17.21% | 696 | | |
| SDLP | Arthur Doherty* | 16.72% | 676 | | |
| SDLP | Thomas Mullan* | 15.29% | 618 | 620.88 | 725.32 |
| DUP | Ernest Murray* | 11.65% | 471 | 585.4 | 589.18 |
Electorate: 6,002 Valid: 4,043 (67.36%) Spoilt: 73 Quota: 674 Turnout: 4,116 (68.58%)

=== Benbradagh ===
1985: 2 x UUP, 2 x Sinn Féin, 1 x SDLP
1989: 2 x UUP, 2 x SDLP, 1 x Sinn Féin
1985–1989 Change: SDLP gain from Sinn Féin

Benbradagh - 5 seats
| Party | Candidate | FPv% | Count | | | | |
| Party | Candidate | FPv% | 1 | 2 | 3 | 4 | 5 |
|---|---|---|---|---|---|---|---|
| SDLP | Lawrence Hegarty* | 26.75% | 987 | | | | |
| UUP | David Robinson* | 25.45% | 939 | | | | |
| Sinn Féin | Thomas Donaghy | 21.49% | 793 | | | | |
| UUP | Max Gault* | 12.09% | 446 | 446.84 | 768.84 | | |
| SDLP | Gerard Lynch | 4.93% | 182 | 523.04 | 523.74 | 528.8 | 542.1 |
| Sinn Féin | Michael Hasson* | 9.30% | 343 | 368.62 | 368.62 | 533.3 | 533.65 |
Electorate: 5,745 Valid: 3,690 (64.23%) Spoilt: 104 Quota: 616 Turnout: 3,794 (66.04%)

=== Limavady Town ===
1985: 3 x UUP, 1 x SDLP, 1 x DUP
1989: 3 x UUP, 1 x SDLP, 1 x DUP
1985–1989 Change: No change

Limavady Town - 5 seats
| Party | Candidate | FPv% | Count | | | |
| Party | Candidate | FPv% | 1 | 2 | 3 | 4 |
|---|---|---|---|---|---|---|
| UUP | Ronald Cartwright* | 23.80% | 961 | | | |
| DUP | George Robinson* | 22.67% | 915 | | | |
| SDLP | Barry Doherty* | 16.99% | 686 | | | |
| UUP | John Dolan* | 11.94% | 482 | 723.2 | | |
| UUP | Norman Reynolds | 9.26% | 374 | 412.1 | 639.98 | 698.98 |
| SDLP | Brian McWilliams | 9.36% | 378 | 378.6 | 379.41 | 481.41 |
| Alliance | Joseph McGuigan | 5.97% | 241 | 244.3 | 250.24 | |
Electorate: 6,571 Valid: 4,037 (61.44%) Spoilt: 75 Quota: 673 Turnout: 4,112 (62.58%)
