= Bellarena (District Electoral Area) =

District electoral areas in Limavady, Northern Ireland

Bellarena DEA (1993-2014) within Limavady

Bellarena was one of the three district electoral areas in Limavady, Northern Ireland which existed from 1985 to 2014. The district elected five members to Limavady Borough Council, and formed part of the East Londonderry constituencies for the Northern Ireland Assembly and UK Parliament.

It was created for the 1985 local elections, replacing Limavady Area A which had existed since 1973, and contained the wards of Aghanloo, Ballykelly, Black, Greysteel and Magilligan. It was abolished for the 2014 local elections and divided between the Limavady DEA and the Benbradagh DEA.

== Councillors ==
| Election | Councillor (Party) | Councillor (Party) | Councillor (Party) | Councillor (Party) | Councillor (Party) |
|---|---|---|---|---|---|
| 2011 | Dermot Nicholl (Sinn Féin) | Cathal McLaughlin (Sinn Féin) | Orla Beattie (SDLP) | Edwin Stevenson (UUP) | George Robinson (DUP) |
| 2005 | Gerard Butcher (Sinn Féin) | John McElhinney (Sinn Féin) | Michael Carten (SDLP) | Edwin Stevenson (UUP) | Leslie Cubitt (DUP) |
| 2001 | Martin McGuigan (Sinn Féin) | Gerry Mullan (SDLP) | Michael Carten (SDLP) | Edwin Stevenson (UUP) | Leslie Cubitt (DUP) |
| 1997 | John McKinney (SDLP) | Arthur Doherty (SDLP) | Michael Carten (SDLP) | Stanley Gault (UUP) | Robert Grant (UUP) |
| 1993 | John McKinney (SDLP) | Arthur Doherty (SDLP) | Thomas Mullan (SDLP) | Stanley Gault (UUP) | Robert Grant (UUP) |
| 1989 | John McKinney (SDLP) | Arthur Doherty (SDLP) | Thomas Mullan (SDLP) | Stanley Gault (UUP) | Robert Grant (UUP) |
| 1985 | Ernest Murray (DUP) | Arthur Doherty (SDLP) | Thomas Mullan (SDLP) | Stanley Gault (UUP) | Robert Grant (UUP) |

== 2011 Election ==
2005: 2 x Sinn Féin, 1 x DUP, 1 x SDLP, 1 x UUP

2011: 2 x Sinn Féin, 1 x DUP, 1 x SDLP, 1 x UUP

2005-2011 Change: No change

Bellarena - 5 seats
| Party | Candidate | FPv% | Count | | | | |
| Party | Candidate | FPv% | 1 | 2 | 3 | 4 | 5 |
|---|---|---|---|---|---|---|---|
| DUP | George Robinson* | 22.04% | 1,016 | | | | |
| Sinn Féin | Dermot Nicholl | 19.87% | 944 | | | | |
| SDLP | Orla Beattie | 11.85% | 563 | 565.2 | 584.56 | 816.56 | |
| Sinn Féin | Cathal McLaughlin | 14.19% | 674 | 674.44 | 786.44 | 814.44 | |
| UUP | Edwin Stevenson* | 12.12% | 576 | 615.6 | 615.6 | 620.14 | 793.14 |
| DUP | Jonathan Holmes | 7.81% | 371 | 529.4 | 529.72 | 531.94 | 612.94 |
| Independent | Leslie Cubitt* | 6.55% | 311 | 326.84 | 326.84 | 333 | |
| SDLP | Oonagh McNickle | 6.23% | 296 | 296.44 | 308.92 | | |
Electorate: 8,808 Valid: 4,751 (53.94%) Spoilt: 99 Quota: 792 Turnout: 4,850 (55.06%)

== 2005 Election ==
2001: 2 x SDLP, 1 x DUP, 1 x UUP, 1 x Sinn Féin

2005: 2 x Sinn Féin, 1 x DUP, 1 x SDLP, 1 x UUP

2001-2005 Change: Sinn Féin gain from SDLP

Bellarena - 5 seats
| Party | Candidate | FPv% | Count | | | |
| Party | Candidate | FPv% | 1 | 2 | 3 | 4 |
|---|---|---|---|---|---|---|
| DUP | Leslie Cubitt* | 23.65% | 1,189 | | | |
| SDLP | Michael Carten* | 12.53% | 630 | 631.8 | 883.8 | |
| UUP | Edwin Stevenson* | 15.10% | 759 | 833.7 | 839 | |
| Sinn Féin | Gerard Butcher | 13.27% | 667 | 667 | 708 | 770 |
| Sinn Féin | John McElhinney | 11.99% | 603 | 603.3 | 612.3 | 743.3 |
| DUP | Arnold Shannon | 6.36% | 320 | 586.4 | 589.7 | 602.6 |
| SDLP | John McKinney | 9.96% | 501 | 502.8 | 541.4 | |
| SDLP | Deborah Crewe | 7.14% | 359 | 360.5 | | |
Electorate: 8,050 Valid: 5,028 (62.46%) Spoilt: 77 Quota: 839 Turnout: 5,105 (63.42%)

== 2001 Election ==
1997: 3 x SDLP, 2 x UUP

2001: 2 x SDLP, 1 x UUP, 1 x DUP, 1 x Sinn Féin

1997-2001 Change: DUP and Sinn Féin gain from UUP and SDLP

Bellarena - 5 seats
| Party | Candidate | FPv% | Count | | | |
| Party | Candidate | FPv% | 1 | 2 | 3 | 4 |
|---|---|---|---|---|---|---|
| DUP | Leslie Cubitt | 18.81% | 1,027 | | | |
| SDLP | Michael Carten* | 15.48% | 845 | 846.44 | 1,200.44 | |
| SDLP | Gerry Mullan | 13.21% | 721 | 721 | 918 | |
| Sinn Féin | Martin McGuigan | 15.26% | 833 | 833 | 917 | |
| UUP | Edwin Stevenson | 12.95% | 707 | 759.44 | 760.44 | 765.44 |
| UUP | William Smyth | 11.74% | 641 | 703.88 | 709 | 724 |
| SDLP | John McKinney* | 12.55% | 685 | 685.24 | | |
Electorate: 7,656 Valid: 5,459 (71.30%) Spoilt: 68 Quota: 910 Turnout: 5,527 (72.19%)

== 1997 Election ==
1993: 3 x SDLP, 2 x UUP

1997: 3 x SDLP, 2 x UUP

1993-1997 Change: No change

Bellarena - 5 seats
| Party | Candidate | FPv% | Count | | |
| Party | Candidate | FPv% | 1 | 2 | 3 |
|---|---|---|---|---|---|
| UUP | Stanley Gault* | 19.14% | 839 | | |
| SDLP | Michael Carten | 18.57% | 814 | | |
| SDLP | Arthur Doherty* | 18.21% | 798 | | |
| UUP | Robert Grant* | 17.45% | 765 | | |
| SDLP | John McKinney* | 16.29% | 714 | 714.7 | 793.1 |
| DUP | Robert Glass | 10.34% | 453 | 556.18 | 556.48 |
Electorate: 6,868 Valid: 4,383 (63.82%) Spoilt: 42 Quota: 731 Turnout: 4,425 (64.43%)

== 1993 Election ==
1989: 3 x SDLP, 2 x UUP

1993: 3 x SDLP, 2 x UUP

1989–1993 Change: No change

Bellarena - 5 seats
| Party | Candidate | FPv% | Count | | |
| Party | Candidate | FPv% | 1 | 2 | 3 |
|---|---|---|---|---|---|
| UUP | Stanley Gault* | 21.42% | 880 | | |
| SDLP | Arthur Doherty* | 20.84% | 856 | | |
| SDLP | Thomas Mullan* | 16.77% | 689 | | |
| UUP | Robert Grant* | 15.43% | 634 | 809.34 | |
| SDLP | John McKinney* | 16.09% | 661 | 661 | 826.48 |
| DUP | Ernest Murray | 9.44% | 388 | 402.74 | 405.26 |
Electorate: 6,221 Valid: 4,108 (66.03%) Spoilt: 75 Quota: 685 Turnout: 4,183 (67.24%)

== 1989 Election ==
1985: 2 x SDLP, 2 x UUP, 1 x DUP

1989: 3 x SDLP, 2 x UUP

1985–1989 Change: SDLP gain from DUP

Bellarena - 5 seats
| Party | Candidate | FPv% | Count | | |
| Party | Candidate | FPv% | 1 | 2 | 3 |
|---|---|---|---|---|---|
| UUP | Stanley Gault* | 19.71% | 797 | | |
| SDLP | John McKinney | 19.42% | 785 | | |
| UUP | Robert Grant* | 17.21% | 696 | | |
| SDLP | Arthur Doherty* | 16.72% | 676 | | |
| SDLP | Thomas Mullan* | 15.29% | 618 | 620.88 | 725.32 |
| DUP | Ernest Murray* | 11.65% | 471 | 585.4 | 589.18 |
Electorate: 6,002 Valid: 4,043 (67.36%) Spoilt: 73 Quota: 674 Turnout: 4,116 (68.58%)

== 1985 Election ==
1985: 2 x SDLP, 2 x UUP, 1 x DUP

Bellarena - 5 seats
| Party | Candidate | FPv% | Count | |
| Party | Candidate | FPv% | 1 | 2 |
|---|---|---|---|---|
| UUP | Robert Grant* | 20.07% | 793 | |
| UUP | Stanley Gault* | 18.85% | 745 | |
| SDLP | Arthur Doherty* | 17.84% | 705 | |
| DUP | Ernest Murray* | 13.66% | 540 | 663.69 |
| SDLP | Thomas Mullan* | 14.93% | 590 | 594.18 |
| SDLP | Roy King* | 14.65% | 579 | 582.23 |
Electorate: 5,691 Valid: 3,952 (69.44%) Spoilt: 75 Quota: 659 Turnout: 4,027 (70.76%)
