= 1985 Limavady District Council election =

Local government election in Northern Ireland

1985 Limavady Borough Council election
← 1981	15 May 1985	1989 →

All 15 seats to Limavady Borough Council 8 seats needed for a majority
	First party	Second party	Third party
Party	UUP	SDLP	Sinn Féin
Seats won	7	4	2
Seat change	▲1	▼2	▲2
	Fourth party	Fifth party	Sixth party
Party	DUP	Independent	Irish Independence
Seats won	2	0	0
Seat change	0	▼1	▼1

Elections to Limavady Borough Council were held on 15 May 1985 on the same day as the other Northern Irish local government elections. The election used three district electoral areas to elect a total of 15 councillors.

== Election results ==
Limavady Borough Council Election Result 1985
Party	Seats	Gains	Losses	Net gain/loss	Seats %	Votes %	Votes	+/−
UUP	7	1	0	▲1	46.7	39.4	4,666	▲2.2
SDLP	4	0	1	▼1	26.7	32.9	3,899	▼1.3
Sinn Féin	2	2	0	▲2	13.3	10.5	1,247	New
DUP	2	0	0	0	13.3	9.7	1,148	▼6.7
Independent	0	0	1	▼1	0.0	3.4	404	▼0.9
Ind. Unionist	0	0	0	0	0.0	2.2	249	▲2.2
Alliance	0	0	0	0	0.0	1.9	228	▼0.1

Note: "Votes" are the first preference votes.

== Districts summary ==
Results of the Limavady Borough Council election, 1985 by district
Ward	%	Cllrs	%	Cllrs	%	Cllrs	%	Cllrs	%	Cllrs	Total Cllrs
Ward	UUP		SDLP		Sinn Féin		DUP		Others		Total Cllrs
Bellarena	38.9	2	47.4	2	0.0	0	13.7	1	0.0	0	5
Benbradagh	29.8	2	23.1	1	32.0	2	4.7	0	10.4	0	5
Limavady Town	49.3	3	28.2	1	0.0	0	10.6	1	11.9	0	5
Total	39.4	7	32.9	4	10.5	1	9.7	1	7.5	0	15

== District results ==
=== Bellarena ===
1985: 2 x SDLP, 2 x UUP, 1 x DUP

Bellarena - 5 seats
Party	Candidate	FPv%	Count	
Party	Candidate	FPv%	1	2
UUP	Robert Grant*	20.07%	793	
UUP	Stanley Gault*	18.85%	745	
SDLP	Arthur Doherty*	17.84%	705	
DUP	Ernest Murray*	13.66%	540	663.69
SDLP	Thomas Mullan*	14.93%	590	594.18
SDLP	Roy King*	14.65%	579	582.23
Electorate: 5,691 Valid: 3,952 (69.44%) Spoilt: 75 Quota: 659 Turnout: 4,027 (70.76%)

=== Benbradagh ===
1985: 2 x UUP, 2 x Sinn Féin, 1 x SDLP

Benbradagh - 5 seats
Party	Candidate	FPv%	Count					
Party	Candidate	FPv%	1	2	3	4	5	6
Sinn Féin	Michael McGonigle	22.58%	880					
UUP	David Robinson*	21.17%	825					
UUP	Max Gault*	8.62%	336	336	480.48			
SDLP	Lawrence Hegarty*	15.01%	585	598	598	599	811	
Sinn Féin	Michael Hasson	9.42%	367	564.6	564.6	565.6	598.42	624.42
Independent	Denis Farren*	10.37%	404	412.06	413.32	413.74	464.78	549.78
SDLP	James Brolly	8.11%	316	320.94	321.15	321.15		
DUP	John McKay	4.72%	184	184	208.99			
Electorate: 5,653 Valid: 3,897 (68.94%) Spoilt: 92 Quota: 650 Turnout: 3,989 (70.56%)

=== Limavady Town ===
1985: 3 x UUP, 1 x SDLP, 1 x DUP

Limavady Town - 5 seats
Party	Candidate	FPv%	Count						
Party	Candidate	FPv%	1	2	3	4	5	6	7
SDLP	Barry Doherty*	22.22%	887						
UUP	Ronald Cartwright	19.94%	796						
UUP	John Dolan	19.34%	772						
UUP	Samuel Millar	9.99%	399	399.5	505.58	584.1	625.31	680.31	
DUP	George Robinson	6.71%	268	268	270.24	274.4	377.42	390.73	618.73
SDLP	Brian McWilliams	5.94%	237	438.25	438.25	439.16	439.29	526.45	534.45
Ind. Unionist	William Norris*	6.24%	249	249.75	261.27	270.24	281.82	314.99	
Alliance	John Mullan	5.71%	228	239.5	242.86	243.9	247.41		
DUP	Eric Caldwell	3.91%	156	156.5	159.86	165.45			
Electorate: 5,758 Valid: 3,992 (69.33%) Spoilt: 53 Quota: 666 Turnout: 4,045 (70.25%)
