= Limavady (District Electoral Area) =

District electoral area in Northern Ireland

- Causeway Coast and Glens Borough Council DEA constituency

Current constituency
- Created: 1985
- Seats: 5 (1985-)
- Councillors: Steven Callaghan (DUP); Aaron Callan (DUP); Brenda Chivers (SF); Amy Mairs (APNI); Ashleen Schenning (SDLP)

Limavady DEA within Causeway Coast and Glens

Limavady Town DEA (1993-2014) within Limavady

Limavady is one of the seven district electoral areas (DEA) in Causeway Coast and Glens, Northern Ireland. The district elects five members to Causeway Coast and Glens Borough Council and contains the wards of Coolessan, Drumsurn, Greystone, Magilligan and Roeside. Limavady forms part of the East Londonderry constituencies for the Northern Ireland Assembly and UK Parliament.

It was created for the 1985 local elections, replacing Limavady Area C which had existed since 1973, where it was called Limavady Town until 2014, and contained five wards (Binevenagh, Coolessan, Enagh, Rathbrady and Roeside). For the 1993 local elections Binevenagh was replaced with Greystone. For the 2014 local elections it gained most of the abolished Bellarena DEA.

== Councillors ==
Election	Councillor (Party)	Councillor (Party)	Councillor (Party)	Councillor (Party)	Councillor (Party)
2023	Brenda Chivers (Sinn Féin)	Ashleen Schenning (SDLP)	Amy Mairs (Alliance)	Steven Callaghan (DUP)	Aaron Callan (DUP)/ (UUP)
June 2022 Co-Option	Brenda Chivers (Sinn Féin)	Ashleen Schenning (SDLP)	James McCorkell (DUP)/ (Independent)	Steven Callaghan (DUP)	Aaron Callan (DUP)/ (UUP)
June 2021 Defection	Brenda Chivers (Sinn Féin)	Ashleen Schenning (SDLP)	James McCorkell (DUP)/ (Independent)	Alan Robinson (DUP)	Aaron Callan (DUP)/ (UUP)
2019	Brenda Chivers (Sinn Féin)	Ashleen Schenning (SDLP)	James McCorkell (DUP)/ (Independent)	Alan Robinson (DUP)	Aaron Callan (DUP)/ (UUP)
October 2016 Defection	Brenda Chivers (Sinn Féin)	John Deighan (SDLP)	James McCorkell (DUP)/ (Independent)	Alan Robinson (DUP)	Aaron Callan (DUP)/ (UUP)
June 2016 Co-Option	Brenda Chivers (Sinn Féin)	John Deighan (SDLP)	James McCorkell (DUP)/ (Independent)	Alan Robinson (DUP)	Aaron Callan (DUP)/ (UUP)
2014	Brenda Chivers (Sinn Féin)	Gerry Mullan (SDLP)	James McCorkell (DUP)/ (Independent)	Alan Robinson (DUP)	Aaron Callan (DUP)/ (UUP)
2011	Anne Brolly (Sinn Féin)	Gerry Mullan (SDLP)	James McCorkell (DUP)/ (Independent)	Alan Robinson (DUP)	John Rankin (UUP)
2005	Anne Brolly (Sinn Féin)	Gerry Mullan (SDLP)	George Robinson (DUP)	Alan Robinson (DUP)	John Rankin (UUP)
2001	Brian Brown (Independent)	Desmond Lowry (SDLP)	George Robinson (DUP)	John Dolan (UUP)	John Rankin (UUP)
1997	Barry Doherty (SDLP)	Desmond Lowry (SDLP)	George Robinson (DUP)	John Dolan (UUP)	Ronald Cartwright (UUP)
1993	Barry Doherty (SDLP)	Desmond Lowry (SDLP)	George Robinson (DUP)	John Dolan (UUP)	Ronald Cartwright (UUP)
1989	Barry Doherty (SDLP)	Norman Reynolds (UUP)	George Robinson (DUP)	John Dolan (UUP)	Ronald Cartwright (UUP)
1985	Barry Doherty (SDLP)	Samuel Millar (UUP)	George Robinson (DUP)	John Dolan (UUP)	Ronald Cartwright (UUP)

== 2023 Election ==
2019: 3 x DUP, 1 x Sinn Féin, 1 x SDLP

2023: 2 x DUP, 1 x Sinn Féin, 1 x Alliance, 1 x SDLP

2019–2023 Change: Alliance gain from DUP

Limavady - 5 seats
Party	Candidate	FPv%	Count						
Party	Candidate	FPv%	1	2	3	4	5	6	7
Sinn Féin	Brenda Chivers*	29.85%	1,800						
DUP	Steven Callaghan*	16.75%	1,010						
SDLP	Ashleen Schenning*	7.35%	443	974.84	1,049.84				
DUP	Aaron Callan*	8.22%	496	496.48	505.48	506.48	906.96	1,068.96	
Alliance	Amy Mairs	9.07%	547	674.20	754.56	789.56	794.56	914.40	931.65
Independent	James McCorkell*	9.32%	562	567.28	594.56	597.56	649.56	850.56	895.41
UUP	Barry Crawford	8.47%	511	513.40	522.76	523.76	541.76		
DUP	Jordan Wallace	7.93%	478	479.92	485.92	485.92			
Aontú	John Boyle	2.54%	153	269.64					
Independent	Billy Stewart	0.51%	31	32.92					
Electorate: 11,615 Valid: 6,031 (51.92%) Spoilt: 50 Quota: 1,006 Turnout: 6,081 (52.35%)

== 2019 Election ==
2014: 2 x DUP, 1 x Sinn Féin, 1 x SDLP, 1 x UUP

2019: 3 x DUP, 1 x Sinn Féin, 1 x SDLP

2014-2019 Change: DUP gain from UUP

Limavady - 5 seats
Party	Candidate	FPv%	Count					
Party	Candidate	FPv%	1	2	3	4	5	6
DUP	Alan Robinson* †	26.91%	1,498					
Sinn Féin	Brenda Chivers*	18.58%	1,034					
DUP	James McCorkell* ‡	11.75%	654	1,018.8				
DUP	Aaron Callan*	6.92%	385	533.58	534.13	603.21	615.19	922.91
SDLP	Ashleen Schenning	9.33%	519	523.94	578.5	585.5	810.91	831.38
Alliance	Kevin Hayward	10.01%	557	564.22	571.92	584.68	649.3	734.2
UUP	Raymond Kennedy	7.28%	405	424.76	425.09	510.04	513.04	
Aontú	Francie Brolly	6.06%	337	339.28	378	380.22		
TUV	Colin Cartwright	3.16%	176	190.82	191.15			
Electorate: 11,197 Valid: 5,565 (50.51%) Spoilt: 51 Quota: 928 Turnout: 5,616 (50.15%)

== 2014 Election ==
2011: 2 x DUP, 1 x UUP, 1 x Sinn Féin, 1 x SDLP

2014: 2 x DUP, 1 x Sinn Féin, 1 x UUP, 1 x SDLP

2011-2014 Change: No change

Limavady - 5 seats
Party	Candidate	FPv%	Count									
Party	Candidate	FPv%	1	2	3	4	5	6	7	8	9	10
DUP	Alan Robinson*	26.43%	1,451									
DUP	James McCorkell*	8.41%	462	840.88	859.1	864.1	1,105.1					
Sinn Féin	Brenda Chivers*	14.51%	797	797	798	843.74	843.74	843.74	1,177.74			
SDLP	Gerry Mullan*†	10.49%	576	582.66	591.4	778.4	782.51	783.51	820.88	1,013.88		
UUP	Aaron Callan ‡	8.23%	452	485.3	500.04	507.15	546.72	607.72	608.09	608.09	610.09	815.11
UUP	Raymond Kennedy	7.18%	394	408.8	416.17	418.17	446.38	521.38	521.38	522.38	528.38	682.3
Sinn Féin	Rory Donaghy*	6.77%	372	373.11	373.11	381.11	382.11	382.11				
TUV	Howard Gordon	5.92%	325	343.87	366.98	370.72	390.71					
DUP	Jonathan Holmes	5.32%	292	353.79	362.53	365.53						
SDLP	Jason Allen	4.88%	268	270.96	276.96							
UKIP	Richard Nicholl	1.86%	102	109.03								
Electorate: 10,998 Valid: 5,491 (49.93%) Spoilt: 88 Quota: 916 Turnout: 5,579 (50.73%)

== 2011 Election ==
2005: 2 x DUP, 1 x UUP, 1 x Sinn Féin, 1 x SDLP

2011: 2 x DUP, 1 x UUP, 1 x Sinn Féin, 1 x SDLP

2005-2011 Change: No change

Limavady Town - 5 seats
Party	Candidate	FPv%	Count					
Party	Candidate	FPv%	1	2	3	4	5	6
DUP	Alan Robinson*	29.42%	903					
Sinn Féin	Anne Brolly*	18.05%	554					
DUP	James McCorkell	6.16%	189	349.16	353.48	353.66	367.42	617.98
UUP	John Rankin*	11.27%	346	414.2	429.64	429.73	486.7	503.86
SDLP	Gerry Mullan*	11.21%	344	347.08	386.52	420.99	498.38	503.82
UUP	Aaron Callan	8.05%	247	269.44	286.44	286.62	322.59	331.35
DUP	Jim Quigg	5.08%	156	276.56	281.56	281.92	295.36	
Independent	Brian Brown	6.42%	197	203.6	240.04	245.35		
Alliance	Damien Corr	4.33%	133	136.08				
Electorate: 6,058 Valid: 3,069 (50.66%) Spoilt: 47 Quota: 512 Turnout: 3,116 (51.44%)

== 2005 Election ==
2001: 2 x UUP, 1 x DUP, 1 x SDLP, 1 x Independent

2005: 2 x DUP, 1 x UUP, 1 x Sinn Féin, 1 x SDLP

2001-2005 Change: DUP and Sinn Féin gain from UUP and Independent

Limavady Town - 5 seats
Party	Candidate	FPv%	Count			
Party	Candidate	FPv%	1	2	3	4
DUP	George Robinson*	23.50%	876			
DUP	Alan Robinson	20.61%	768			
Sinn Féin	Anne Brolly*	17.63%	657			
UUP	John Rankin*	12.66%	472	662.35		
SDLP	Gerry Mullan*	11.11%	414	416.48	418.46	661.46
UUP	John Dolan*	7.54%	281	374	511.94	513.94
SDLP	Gareth Peoples	6.95%	259	260.55	262.97	
Electorate: 6,322 Valid: 3,727 (58.95%) Spoilt: 58 Quota: 622 Turnout: 3,785 (59.87%)

== 2001 Election ==
1997: 2 x UUP, 2 x SDLP, 1 x DUP

2001: 2 x UUP, 1 x DUP, 1 x SDLP, 1 x Independent

1997-2001 Change: Independent gain from SDLP

Limavady Town - 5 seats
Party	Candidate	FPv%	Count				
Party	Candidate	FPv%	1	2	3	4	5
DUP	George Robinson*	30.30%	1,430				
UUP	John Dolan*	8.11%	383	592.76	703.62	819.74	
UUP	John Rankin	7.88%	372	502.64	681.8	816.88	
Independent	Brian Brown	13.60%	642	704.1	713.86	768.18	793.18
SDLP	Desmond Lowry*	11.48%	542	544.76	544.76	545.22	784.68
SDLP	John Kerr	11.23%	530	532.76	532.76	533.76	627.76
Sinn Féin	Malachy O'Kane*	8.88%	419	419.92	419.92	419.92	
United Unionist	Alister Smyth	3.41%	161	316.02	322.32		
UUP	Raymond Kennedy	5.11%	241	309.08			
Electorate: 6,877 Valid: 4,720 (68.63%) Spoilt: 59 Quota: 787 Turnout: 4,779 (69.49%)

== 1997 Election ==
1993: 2 x UUP, 2 x SDLP, 1 x DUP

1997: 2 x UUP, 2 x SDLP, 1 x DUP

1993-1997 Change: No change

Limavady Town - 5 seats
Party	Candidate	FPv%	Count	
Party	Candidate	FPv%	1	2
DUP	George Robinson*	18.47%	837	
SDLP	Desmond Lowry*	16.75%	759	
UUP	Ronald Cartwright*	16.09%	729	800
UUP	John Dolan*	16.29%	738	782
SDLP	Barry Doherty*	16.31%	739	779
UUP	Norman Reynolds	10.68%	484	549
DUP	Victor Wilson	3.47%	157	
NI Women's Coalition	Paula Taylor	1.94%	88	
Electorate: 7,113 Valid: 4,531 (63.70%) Spoilt: 75 Quota: 756 Turnout: 4,606 (64.75%)

== 1993 Election ==
1989: 3 x UUP, 1 x SDLP, 1 x DUP

1993: 2 x UUP, 2 x SDLP, 1 x DUP

1989–1993 Change: SDLP gain from UUP

Limavady Town - 5 seats
Party	Candidate	FPv%	Count		
Party	Candidate	FPv%	1	2	3
DUP	George Robinson*	19.40%	884		
SDLP	Barry Doherty*	17.60%	802		
UUP	Ronald Cartwright*	17.34%	790		
UUP	John Dolan*	15.80%	720	771	
SDLP	Desmond Lowry	16.52%	753	755	758.23
UUP	Norman Reynolds*	12.11%	522	548	665.13
DUP	John Murray	1.89%	86		
Electorate: 6,959 Valid: 4,557 (65.48%) Spoilt: 66 Quota: 760 Turnout: 4,623 (66.43%)

== 1989 Election ==
1985: 3 x UUP, 1 x SDLP, 1 x DUP

1989: 3 x UUP, 1 x SDLP, 1 x DUP

1985–1989 Change: No change

Limavady Town - 5 seats
Party	Candidate	FPv%	Count			
Party	Candidate	FPv%	1	2	3	4
UUP	Ronald Cartwright*	23.80%	961			
DUP	George Robinson*	22.67%	915			
SDLP	Barry Doherty*	16.99%	686			
UUP	John Dolan*	11.94%	482	723.2		
UUP	Norman Reynolds	9.26%	374	412.1	639.98	698.98
SDLP	Brian McWilliams	9.36%	378	378.6	379.41	481.41
Alliance	Joseph McGuigan	5.97%	241	244.3	250.24	
Electorate: 6,571 Valid: 4,037 (61.44%) Spoilt: 75 Quota: 673 Turnout: 4,112 (62.58%)

== 1985 Election ==
1985: 3 x UUP, 1 x SDLP, 1 x DUP

Limavady Town - 5 seats
Party	Candidate	FPv%	Count						
Party	Candidate	FPv%	1	2	3	4	5	6	7
SDLP	Barry Doherty*	22.22%	887						
UUP	Ronald Cartwright	19.94%	796						
UUP	John Dolan	19.34%	772						
UUP	Samuel Millar	9.99%	399	399.5	505.58	584.1	625.31	680.31	
DUP	George Robinson	6.71%	268	268	270.24	274.4	377.42	390.73	618.73
SDLP	Brian McWilliams	5.94%	237	438.25	438.25	439.16	439.29	526.45	534.45
Ind. Unionist	William Norris*	6.24%	249	249.75	261.27	270.24	281.82	314.99	
Alliance	John Mullan	5.71%	228	239.5	242.86	243.9	247.41		
DUP	Eric Caldwell	3.91%	156	156.5	159.86	165.45			
Electorate: 5,758 Valid: 3,992 (69.33%) Spoilt: 53 Quota: 666 Turnout: 4,045 (70.25%)
