= Anne Brolly =

Irish politician

Mayor of Limavady
- In office 2003 – 14 June 2004
- Preceded by: George Robinson
- Succeeded by: John Rankin

Member of Limavady Borough Council
- In office 5 May 2005 – 22 May 2014
- Preceded by: Brian Brown
- Succeeded by: Council abolished
- Constituency: Limavady Town
- In office 7 June 2001 – 5 May 2005
- Preceded by: Max Gault
- Succeeded by: Brenda Chivers
- Constituency: Benbradagh

Personal details
- Born: County Londonderry, Northern Ireland
- Political party: Aontú (since 2019); Sinn Féin (before 2016)
- Spouse: Francie (?–2020; his death)
- Children: Joe; Proinnsias; Conal; Áine; Nodlaig

Anne Brolly is a former Irish republican politician, musician and singer who was Mayor of Limavady from 2003 to 2004, and a Limavady Borough Councillor for the Benbradagh DEA from 2001 to 2005. She then represented Limavady Town on the council until 2014. Initially a member of Sinn Féin, Brolly resigned from the party in 2016, over its abortion stance. She later joined Aontú in 2019.

== Background ==
In 2001, Brolly was elected as a councillor to Limavady Borough Council for the electoral area of Benbradagh. She topped the first preference votes with 1056, and her husband came in second with 917. He was also elected to the council. The quota was 840.

In 2003, Brolly took over from George Robinson of the Democratic Unionist Party (DUP) as the Mayor of Limavady. At Christmas 2003 she was asked to switch on the Christmas tree lights for Burnfoot. There was a small Loyalist protest during the switching-on of the lights because of the election of a Sinn Féin mayor. Afterwards, the tree was cut down by vandals and the lights smashed. On 14 June 2004 Councillor Brolly stood down as Mayor.

In October 2004, the High Court of Northern Ireland ordered the government to provide the Brolly couple with protection, following reports of threats from the Red Hand Defenders, a Loyalist paramilitary group.

In 2005, she was re-elected to the council, but this time for the Limavady Town electoral area. She garnered 657 first preference votes, a total of 17.6% of the vote. She was the only Sinn Féin councillor elected in that area, coming third behind George Robinson and Alan Robinson both of the DUP.

In January 2008, Brolly and another councillor were confronted by a crowd in an "extremely nasty mood" outside the council's offices. Police were called.

In 2016, Brolly revealed that she left Sinn Féin over its support for abortion. In March 2019, she and her husband joined Aontú, a new anti-abortion republican party founded by former Sinn Féin TD Peadar Tóibín.

=== Personal life ===
She was the wife of MLA Francie Brolly, till he died in 2020, and together they formed a singing duo and write songs. Their son Joe is a former footballer (now a TV sports pundit) who played for the Derry county team.

Political offices
Preceded by George Robinson	Mayor of Limavady; 2003–2004	Succeeded by John Rankin
