= Joe Brolly =

Gaelic footballer and football analyst

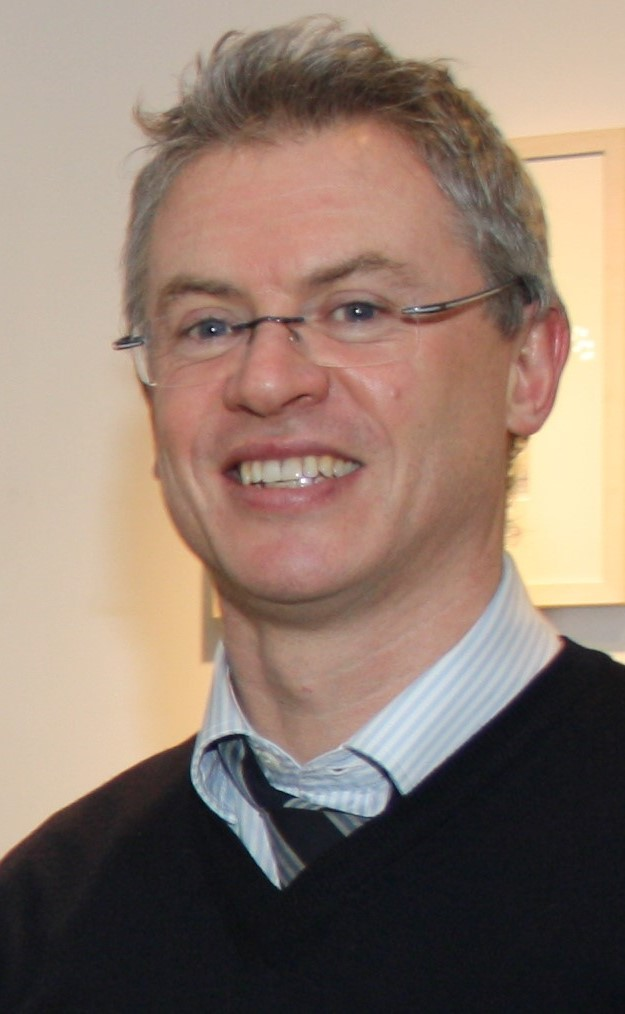
- Joe Brolly, taken at a 2011 event to promote the Irish language

Personal information
- Born: 25 June 1969 (age 57) Dungiven, Northern Ireland
- Occupations: Barrister, columnist, television pundit
- Height: 5 ft 10 in (178 cm)

Sport
- Sport: Gaelic football
- Position: Corner forward
Clubs
- Years: Club
- ?–?: Dungiven; St Brigid's
Club titles
- Derry titles: 2
- Ulster titles: 1
Inter-county
- Years: County
- 1990–2001: Derry
Inter-county titles
- Ulster titles: 2
- All-Irelands: 1
- NFL: 4
- All Stars: 2

Joe Brolly (born Padraig Joseph Brolly; 25 June 1969) is an Irish Gaelic football analyst, coach, selector, former player and barrister who played at senior level for the Derry county team. He is from Dungiven.

Brolly played for Derry in the 1990s and early 2000s and was part of the county's only All-Ireland Senior Football Championship winning side in 1993. He also won two Ulster Senior Football Championships and four National League titles. Brolly played club football for St Canice's Dungiven for most of his career, before transferring to St Brigid's GAC in Belfast. He usually played as right corner forward and was renowned for his accurate point-taking, goal-scoring ability, pace and ability to take on opponents. He was also known for his goal celebration of blowing kisses to the crowd, and had his nose broken twice during his career immediately after scoring goals.

After retiring as a player, Brolly became a television pundit, most prominently with RTÉ on The Sunday Game until 2019.

Outside of sports, Brolly is often involved in both political punditry and political activism, particularly around Irish republican causes.

== Early and family life ==
Brolly is the son of noted traditional singer and Limavady Sinn Féin councillor Anne Brolly. His father Francie, also a traditional musician, played Gaelic football for Derry in the 1960s, and was later a Sinn Féin councillor and MLA.

Brolly boarded in Saint Patrick's Grammar School, Armagh where he played basketball for Ireland as a schoolboy. After school he progressed to Trinity College Dublin to read law graduating in 1991 with a Bachelors in Laws degree, before doing a postgraduate course at Queen's University Belfast. He was a prominent member of the Dublin University Central Athletic Club (DUCAC) in his Trinity days, and became a member of the student executive.

Brolly's first wife was Emma-Rose McCann from Ballymena, daughter of the famous Jack McCann, historian, raconteur and proprietor of Jack McCann & Son Solicitors, whom he met in Trinity where she studied French and English literature before qualifying as a solicitor. Emma is a first cousin of the actor Liam Neeson. The couple have five children. Brolly is now married to podcaster and radio presenter Laurita Blewitt. They married at the Ice House Hotel in County Mayo in August 2022.

Joe Brolly is a first cousin of Derry player Liam Hinphey and Monaghan player Vincent Corey, and second cousin to Tyrone footballers Colm and Plunkett Donaghy.

== Playing career ==
=== County ===
Brolly made his Derry Senior debut against Cavan in the 1990 National League. In 1993 he was part of the Derry side that won the Ulster Championship and the county's first All-Ireland Senior Football Championship. His All Stars Award recognition surprisingly came in the relatively barren years of 1996 and 1997. He was top scorer in the 1997 Ulster Championship with 3–15 (24 points). Brolly added a second Ulster Senior Football Championship in 1998, in the final of which he scored the clinching goal in the last minute. Derry won the National Football League four times in a nine-year period from 1992 to 2000 (1992, 1995, 1996, 2000), with Brolly being part of all four. Brolly and Derry finished runners-up to Offaly in the 1998 National League decider.

=== Club ===
As a 21-year-old, Brolly was part of Dungiven's Derry Senior Football Championship success in 1991. Brolly won another Derry Championship medal in 1997, and also won the Ulster Club Championship. He was top scorer in that year's Derry Championship with 1–25 (28 points) and was man of the match in the final at Celtic Park.

He played for St Brigid's GAC in Belfast when it won the Antrim Intermediate Football Championship. In 2006 St Brigid's became the first GAA club to play against the Police Service of Northern Ireland Gaelic football team. In 2009 Brolly broke his leg while playing in a challenge match against Cookstown. St Brigid's reached that year's Antrim Senior Football Championship semi-final, but were defeated after a replay by a point by Portglenone.

=== College ===
It was in the Sigerson Cup that Joe Brolly first appeared on the national stage. He won his only inter-varsity medal in 1992, as a member of Queen's victorious Ryan Cup team.

=== Hurling ===
Brolly played hurling for local club Kevin Lynch's when they won Division 2 of the All-Ireland Féile na nGael in 1982.

== Coaching and managerial career ==
Brolly helped out with the Antrim team that finished runners-up in the 2007 Tommy Murphy Cup and winners of the 2008 competition.

Brolly joined Mayo club Knockmore GAA as a selector and head coach in 2025, working with Dessie Sloyan and manager Ray Dempsey. The club reached the 2025 Mayo Senior Football Championship semi-finals with Brolly involved. In February 2026, Brolly went on to become a ladies' Gaelic football manager with the club's seniors, but got out of that and was gone 10 days before the championship began.

== Media work ==
Brolly writes a column for Gaelic Life and the Sunday Independent. A radio and television football pundit, he is a former regular on the long-running RTÉ programme The Sunday Game.

As a pundit, Brolly is known for his provocative and often controversial style of commentary. During nearly two decades as an RTÉ GAA analyst, he attracted criticism from fans and teams, including being dubbed the "Salman Rushdie of Mayo" in 2012 after accusing the county team of deliberate fouls. In 2014 he described Cavan football as "as ugly as Marty Morrissey", a comment regarded as unprofessional since Morrissey was a colleague, and later issued an apology. Other remarks, such as referring to Sky Sports presenter Rachel Wyse as a "TV3 plus Baywatch babe", also drew ire. Brolly later apologised and acknowledge the comments were "crass". Keith Duggan, writing in The Irish Times, described Brolly as "the most lippy and articulate pundit on Irish television".

In 2021, Brolly was removed from an appearance on Claire Byrne Live after making critical remarks about the Democratic Unionist Party during a discussion on a united Ireland. Brolly accused the party of "laughing at the Irish language, laughing at Gaelic sports, the homophobia, the racism," comments which the programme producers determined were directed at a previous guest who was not present to respond. RTÉ cut him off mid-broadcast, prompting criticism from Brolly, who described the treatment as "childish and embarrassing" and said it reflected "a serious dysfunction at the heart of RTÉ" and "a new very cold, very ruthless but polite era of saying nothing". The incident attracted dozens of complaints to RTÉ, with many viewers critical of Brolly being pulled from the programme.

In October 2025, Brolly sparked controversy after a video circulated online showing him mimicking oral sex while appearing to impersonate a presidential candidate on his podcast. The clip was widely condemned, with Fine Gael presidential candidate Heather Humphreys calling it "very misogynistic" and saying such behaviour was "targeted at women". She added that she would "stand up for the women of Ireland" and that the incident "won’t knock me back". Brolly later issued two statements. In the first, he insisted that "it was nothing to do with Heather" and that he had been referring instead to "Jim Gavin being unsuited to the insubstantial nature of the presidential campaign". He described the gesture as "childish, crude and inappropriate" and said it "never should have happened". In his clarification, Brolly said he was mocking "the stock questions and responses that happen in a presidential campaign" and not any candidate personally. Independent candidate Catherine Connolly also criticised the incident, saying that "what has been reported is crude and disrespectful to women" and that "misogyny has no place in our politics or our media". Following the remarks, the Bar of Northern Ireland opened a formal conduct investigation into Brolly and stated that it was considering interim measures regarding his legal practice pending the outcome of the inquiry.

== Political views and activism ==
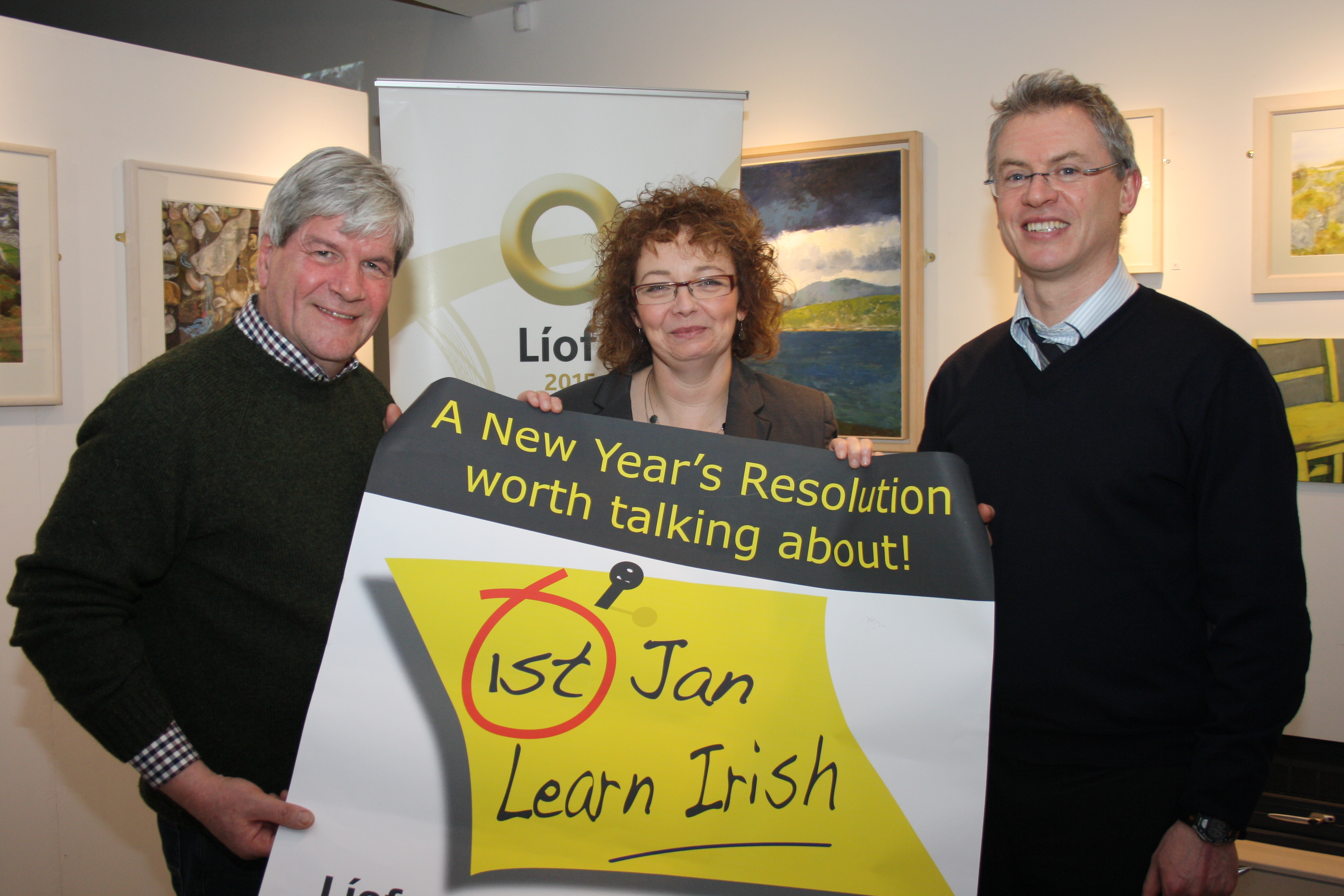
Joe Brolly (right), with other Irish language enthusiasts, taken at a 2011 event advocating that people learn the language

Brolly was born into a family and community with a strong political culture. Both his parents were members of Sinn Féin and became elected politicians, and he has acknowledged that the republican movement and the GAA were the dominant influences in his early environment. He has described how republican actions during the Troubles were often greeted with a sense of triumph in his community, but he has also been clear in stating that he regards the taking of human life as abhorrent. He has reflected on this tension by linking his decision to donate a kidney in 2012 partly out of a desire to atone for the violence committed by people close to him.

Brolly has repeatedly emphasised that he has never supported Sinn Féin at the ballot box, instead voting in the past for the cross-community Northern Ireland Women's Coalition and, more recently, for the SDLP. He has described himself as a "very, very moderate nationalist" and a "political atheist", sceptical of party structures, while also suggesting that he might one day run for a political office. Brolly rejects the legitimacy of Northern Ireland, describing it as unsustainable and arguing that Britain has little real concern for unionists. In 2019, Brolly publicly criticised Sinn Féin for abstentionism at Westminster, arguing that the party was failing to fulfil its political responsibilities and suggesting that it should end the policy, while also defending its decision to collapse the devolved institutions in response to the Democratic Unionist Party’s actions. He has been critical of the DUP more broadly, portraying the party as sectarian, xenophobic and homophobic, and has expressed concern about its handling of issues such as climate change and cultural matters like the Irish language.

In cultural matters, Brolly defends the traditional practices of the GAA, including the flying of the Irish tricolour and the singing of the national anthem at matches, arguing that these are central to the association’s identity. He has also defended the practice of naming clubs after hunger strikers or republican paramilitaries, describing such decisions as matters for local communities rather than outside interference. At the same time, he has spoken of the importance of reconciliation and cooperation, welcoming outreach initiatives and supporting engagement between the GAA and the Police Service of Northern Ireland.

In his professional career as a barrister, Brolly has acted for republican clients, including individuals facing high-profile prosecutions connected to the legacy of the Troubles. He appeared as Counsel in a UK Supreme Court case in 2011 that established a right to compensation for a miscarriage of justice without the requirement to prove the innocence of the wrongly convicted person (in this instance the Derry republicans Eamonn McDermott and Raymond McCartney). In February 2024, Brolly joined legal action on behalf of Belfast-based Irish republican rap group Kneecap after the UK government blocked funding previously approved through the Music Export Growth Scheme. The group stated their application had been independently approved but was subsequently overruled by a government minister, reportedly due to objections to the group’s political stance, including support for Irish unity. Kneecap and Brolly would go on to win the case.

== GAA Career statistics ==
Team	Season	Ulster		All-Ireland		Total	
Team	Season	Apps	Score	Apps	Score	Apps	Score
Derry	1990	1	0-01	0	0-00	1	0-01
Derry	1991	1	0-02	0	0-00	1	0-02
Derry	1992	2	0-00	0	0-00	2	0-02
Derry	1993	2	0-03	2	0-02	4	0-05
Derry	1994	1	0-02	0	0-00	1	0-02
Derry	1995	0	0-00	0	0-00	0	0-00
Derry	1996	2	1-06	0	0-00	2	1-06
Derry	1997	4	3-14	0	0-00	4	3-14
Derry	1998	3	1-10	1	0-00	4	1-10
Derry	1999	2	0-03	0	0-00	2	0-03
Derry	2000	3	0-02	0	0-00	3	0-02
Total		21	5-43	3	0-02	24	5-45

== Honours ==
=== County ===
- All-Ireland Senior Football Championship (1): 1993
- National Football League (4): 1992, 1995, 1996, 2000
- Ulster Senior Football Championship (2): 1993, 1998
- Dr McKenna Cup (2): 1993, 1999

=== Club ===
- Ulster Senior Club Football Championship (1): 1997
- Derry Senior Football Championship (2): 1991, 1997
- Derry Senior Football League (2): 1990, 1991

=== College ===
- Ryan Cup (1): 1992

=== Individual ===
- All Stars Award (2): 1996, 1997
