= Francie Brolly =

Musician, teacher and politician from Dungiven, Northern Ireland

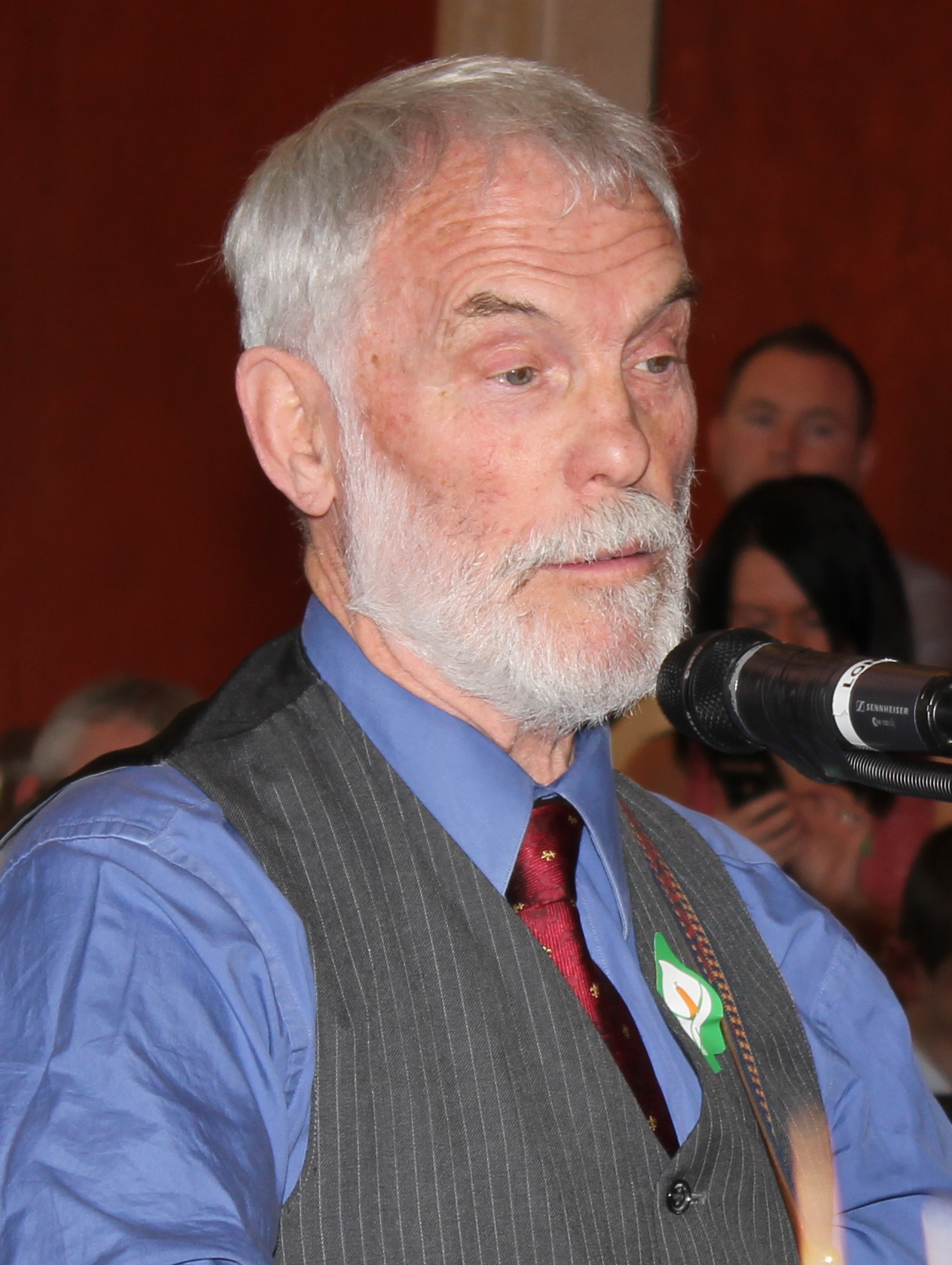
- Brolly in 2013

Member of the Northern Ireland Assembly for East Londonderry
- In office 26 November 2003 – 12 January 2010
- Preceded by: Michael Coyle
- Succeeded by: Billy Leonard

Member of Limavady Borough Council
- In office 7 June 2001 – 5 May 2005
- Preceded by: Gerard Lynch
- Succeeded by: Cathal Ó hOisín
- Constituency: Benbradagh

Personal details
- Born: 13 January 1938 Dungiven, Northern Ireland
- Died: 6 February 2020 (aged 82)
- Party: Aontú (2018–2020)
- Other political affiliations: Sinn Féin (until 2018)
- Spouse: Anne Brolly
- Children: 5, including Joe
- Occupation: Musician, teacher, politician

Francis Brolly (13 January 1938 – 6 February 2020) was an Irish musician, teacher and republican politician from Northern Ireland. Brolly was a Sinn Féin Member of the Northern Ireland Assembly (MLA) for East Londonderry from 2003 to 2010.

== Political career ==
Brolly was elected to Limavady Borough Council in 2001, alongside his wife, Anne, representing the Benbradagh DEA. His wife, incidentally, was the first Sinn Féin mayor, and the first female Mayor of Limavady between 2003 and 2004.

Brolly was first elected to the Northern Ireland Assembly at the 2003 election for East Londonderry.

In 2005, he was arrested by the Police Service of Northern Ireland (PSNI) and questioned about a bombing incident in the village of Claudy in 1972. An official complaint was lodged with the Police Ombudsman regarding the lawfulness of the arrest and this investigation was ongoing. Brolly initiated a legal action in relation to the arrest, against the PSNI but he did not proceed with the matter. The case was 'stayed', which means Francie Brolly didn't pursue the matter and there was no out of court settlement, agreement, acceptance of liability or payment of compensation by the police.

He did not seek re-election to Limavady Borough Council at the 2005 local elections, and stood down from the Assembly in January 2010.

In February 2018, Brolly left the Sinn Féin Party over its support for abortion. In March 2019, he and his wife joined Aontú, a new anti-abortion republican party founded by former Sinn Féin TD Peadar Tóibín.

At the 2019 local elections, Brolly was the Aontú candidate for Limavady, on the Causeway Coast and Glens Borough Council, but was not elected.

== Interests ==
Brolly was an Irish culture enthusiast. A lyricist and musician, he wrote many well-known Irish republican songs, most famously The H-Block Song. His daughter, Nodlaig, is also a well-known singer and Celtic harpist. He served as the Assembly spokesperson for Sinn Féin on Culture, Arts and Leisure, sitting on that department's oversight committee. He was also an Irish language enthusiast and a fluent speaker of the language.

He was a long-standing member of the GAA and played football for the Derry county team. He was an Executive Committee Member of St Canice's GAC Dungiven. His son Joe was part of Derry's 1993 All-Ireland Championship winning side and won two All Stars.

== Death ==
Brolly died on 6 February 2020.

Northern Ireland Assembly
Preceded by Michael Coyle	MLA for East Londonderry; 2003–2010	Succeeded by Billy Leonard
