= Benbradagh (District Electoral Area) =

District electoral area in Northern Ireland

- Causeway Coast and Glens Borough Council DEA constituency

Current constituency
- Created: 1985
- Seats: 5 (1985-)
- Councillors: Michael Coyle (SDLP); Seán McGlinchey (SF); Kathleen McGurk (SF); Dermot Nicholl (SF); Edgar Scott (DUP)

Benbradagh DEA within Causeway Coast and Glens

Benbradagh DEA (1993-2014) within Limavady

Benbradagh is one of the seven district electoral areas (DEA) in Causeway Coast and Glens, Northern Ireland. The district elects five members to Causeway Coast and Glens Borough Council and contains the wards of Altahullion, Ballykelly, Dungiven, Feeny and Greysteel. Benbradagh forms part of the East Londonderry constituencies for the Northern Ireland Assembly and UK Parliament.

It was created for the 1985 local elections, replacing Limavady Area B which had existed since 1973, where it contained five wards (Dungiven, Feeny, Forest, The Highlands and Upper Glenshane). For the 2014 local elections it gained part of the abolished Bellarena DEA around Ballykelly.

== Councillors ==
Election	Councillor (Party)	Councillor (Party)	Councillor (Party)	Councillor (Party)	Councillor (Party)
2023	Seán McGlinchey (Sinn Féin)	Dermot Nicholl (Sinn Féin)	Kathleen McGurk (Sinn Féin)	Michael Coyle (SDLP)	Edgar Scott (DUP)
2019	Seán McGlinchey (Sinn Féin)	Dermot Nicholl (Sinn Féin)	Kathleen McGurk (Sinn Féin)	Orla Beattie (SDLP)	Edgar Scott (DUP)
May 2018 Co-Option	Seán McGlinchey (Sinn Féin)	Dermot Nicholl (Sinn Féin)	Kathleen McGurk (Sinn Féin)	Orla Beattie (SDLP)	Boyd Douglas (TUV)/ (UUC)/ (UUP)
2014	Seán McGlinchey (Sinn Féin)	Dermot Nicholl (Sinn Féin)	Tony McCaul (Sinn Féin)	Orla Beattie (SDLP)	Boyd Douglas (TUV)/ (UUC)/ (UUP)
2011	Seán McGlinchey (Sinn Féin)	Brenda Chivers (Sinn Féin)	Tony McCaul (Sinn Féin)	Michael Coyle (SDLP)	Boyd Douglas (TUV)/ (UUC)/ (UUP)
2005	Marion Donaghy (Sinn Féin)	Brenda Chivers (Sinn Féin)	Cathal Hasson (Sinn Féin)	Michael Coyle (SDLP)	Boyd Douglas (TUV)/ (UUC)/ (UUP)
2001	Marion Donaghy (Sinn Féin)	Anne Brolly (Sinn Féin)	Francis Brolly (Sinn Féin)	Michael Coyle (SDLP)	Boyd Douglas (TUV)/ (UUC)/ (UUP)
1997	Malachy O'Kane (Sinn Féin)	Max Gault (UUP)	Gerard Lynch (SDLP)	Michael Coyle (SDLP)	Boyd Douglas (TUV)/ (UUC)/ (UUP)
1993	Thomas Donaghy (Sinn Féin)	Max Gault (UUP)	Gerard Lynch (SDLP)	Michael Coyle (SDLP)	David Robinson (UUP)
1989	Thomas Donaghy (Sinn Féin)	Max Gault (UUP)	Gerard Lynch (SDLP)	Lawrence Hegarty (SDLP)	David Robinson (UUP)
1985	Michael McGonigle (Sinn Féin)	Max Gault (UUP)	Michael Hasson (Sinn Féin)	Lawrence Hegarty (SDLP)	David Robinson (UUP)

== 2023 Election ==
2019: 3 x Sinn Féin, 1 x SDLP, 1 x DUP

2023: 3 x Sinn Féin, 1 x DUP, 1 x SDLP

2019–2023 Change: No change

Benbradagh - 5 seats
Party	Candidate	FPv%	Count						
Party	Candidate	FPv%	1	2	3	4	5	6	7
Sinn Féin	Sean McGlinchey*	24.04%	1,888						
Sinn Féin	Dermot Nicholl*	19.84%	1,558						
Sinn Féin	Kathleen McGurk*	14.92%	1,172	1,640.00					
DUP	Edgar Scott*	15.68%	1,231	1,231.00	1,231.30	1,231.57	1,256.38	1,755.38	
SDLP	Michael Coyle	5.62%	441	461.70	549.60	710.52	991.86	1,067.60	1,187.60
Aontú	Liam McElhinney	6.29%	494	546.20	645.80	690.08	805.25	812.25	825.25
UUP	Robert Carmichael	7.64%	600	600.00	601.20	601.47	659.94		
Alliance	Christine Turner	4.49%	353	360.20	389.00	420.86			
Independent	Niall Murphy	1.48%	116	131.60	169.40	180.20			
Electorate: 13,317 Valid: 7,853 (58.97%) Spoilt: 50 Quota: 1,309 Turnout: 7,903 (59.34%)

== 2019 Election ==
2014: 3 x Sinn Féin, 1 x SDLP, 1 x TUV

2019: 3 x Sinn Féin, 1 x SDLP, 1 x DUP

2014-2019 Change: DUP gain from TUV

Benbradagh - 5 seats
Party	Candidate	FPv%	Count				
Party	Candidate	FPv%	1	2	3	4	5
Sinn Féin	Seán McGlinchey*	22.33%	1,574				
SDLP	Orla Beattie*	13.08%	922	944.5	1,136.75	1,177.75	
Sinn Féin	Kathleen McGurk*	9.60%	677	974.25	986	986	1,224
Sinn Féin	Dermot Nicholl*	14.21%	1,002	1,029	1,048.25	1,048.25	1,154.25
DUP	Edgar Scott	12.71%	896	896	909	1,088	1,107
TUV	Boyd Douglas*	8.24%	581	581.25	594.25	797.25	814.5
Aontú	Proinnsias Brolly	9.29%	655	692.75	717.75	718.75	
UUP	Robert Carmichael	5.82%	410	410	438		
Alliance	Christine Turner	4.71%	332	335.5			
Electorate: 12,560 Valid: 7,049 (56.12%) Spoilt: 72 Quota: 1,175 Turnout: 7,121 (56.69%)

== 2014 Election ==
2011: 3 x Sinn Féin, 1 x TUV, 1 x SDLP

2014: 3 x Sinn Féin, 1 x TUV, 1 x SDLP

2011-2014 Change: No change

Benbradagh - 5 seats
Party	Candidate	FPv%	Count				
Party	Candidate	FPv%	1	2	3	4	5
Sinn Féin	Seán McGlinchey*	24.31%	1,460				
TUV	Boyd Douglas*	19.62%	1,160				
Sinn Féin	Tony McCaul*	10.69%	632	982.13	1,038.13		
SDLP	Orla Beattie*	11.60%	686	696.89	991.89		
Sinn Féin	Dermot Nicholl*	14.09%	833	904.61	930.79	932.29	959.29
DUP	Edgar Scott*	12.68%	750	750.99	751.99	915.79	915.79
SDLP	Michael Coyle*	6.63%	392	428.96			
Electorate: 11,904 Valid: 5,913 (49.67%) Spoilt: 92 Quota: 986 Turnout: 6,005 (50.45%)

== 2011 Election ==
2005: 3 x Sinn Féin, 1 x United Unionist, 1 x SDLP

2011: 3 x Sinn Féin, 1 x TUV, 1 x SDLP

2005-2011 Change: United Unionist joins TUV

Benbradagh - 5 seats
Party	Candidate	FPv%	Count				
Party	Candidate	FPv%	1	2	3	4	5
Sinn Féin	Sean McGlinchey	19.80%	862				
Sinn Féin	Brenda Chivers*	17.83%	776				
Sinn Féin	Tony McCaul	9.65%	420	425	491.72	514.16	819.16
SDLP	Michael Coyle*	13.03%	567	624	633.92	641.42	696.36
TUV	Boyd Douglas*	15.37%	669	679	679.16	679.4	683.94
DUP	Edgar Scott	12.77%	556	568	568.48	568.66	568.66
Sinn Féin	Rory Donaghy	9.10%	396	401	453.16	467.68	
Alliance	Siobhan Carr	2.46%	107				
Electorate: 7,418 Valid: 4,353 (58.68%) Spoilt: 89 Quota: 726 Turnout: 4,442 (59.88%)

== 2005 Election ==
2001: 3 x Sinn Féin, 1 x United Unionist, 1 x SDLP

2005: 3 x Sinn Féin, 1 x United Unionist, 1 x SDLP

2001-2005 Change: No change

Benbradagh - 5 seats
Party	Candidate	FPv%	Count					
Party	Candidate	FPv%	1	2	3	4	5	6
United Unionist	Boyd Douglas*	20.85%	922					
SDLP	Michael Coyle*	14.36%	635	635.6	833.6			
Sinn Féin	Cathal Hasson	15.06%	666	666	676	699.14	1,038.14	
Sinn Féin	Brenda Chivers	13.82%	611	611.2	631.2	657.9	682.79	851.15
Sinn Féin	Marion Donaghy*	10.95%	484	484.2	502.2	530.68	606.02	737.58
United Unionist	Samuel Oliver	9.18%	406	585	585.6	593.61	593.61	593.61
Sinn Féin	Martin McGuigan	10.00%	442	442.2	442.2	451.1		
SDLP	Evelyn Donaghy	5.79%	256	256.6				
Electorate: 6,956 Valid: 4,422 (63.57%) Spoilt: 97 Quota: 738 Turnout: 4,519 (64.97%)

== 2001 Election ==
1997: 2 x UUP, 2 x SDLP, 1 x Sinn Féin

2001: 3 x Sinn Féin, 1 x United Unionist, 1 x SDLP

1997-2001 Change: Sinn Féin (two seats) gain from UUP and SDLP, United Unionist leaves UUP

Benbradagh - 5 seats
Party	Candidate	FPv%	Count					
Party	Candidate	FPv%	1	2	3	4	5	6
Sinn Féin	Anne Brolly	20.96%	1,056					
Sinn Féin	Francis Brolly	18.21%	917					
United Unionist	Boyd Douglas*	14.85%	748	748.42	918.42			
SDLP	Michael Coyle*	11.10%	559	584.41	587.41	587.41	600.46	978.46
Sinn Féin	Marion Donaghy	11.10%	559	732.67	732.67	732.67	793.42	841.2
United Unionist	Mark Gibson	8.78%	442	442	508	585.28	585.28	588.28
SDLP	Gerard Lynch*	9.87%	497	509.39	512.39	512.85	515.73	
DUP	John Murray	5.14%	259	259				
Electorate: 6,750 Valid: 5,037 (74.62%) Spoilt: 112 Quota: 840 Turnout: 5,149 (76.28%)

== 1997 Election ==
1993: 2 x UUP, 2 x SDLP, 1 x Sinn Féin

1997: 2 x UUP, 2 x SDLP, 1 x Sinn Féin

1993-1997 Change: No change

Benbradagh - 5 seats
Party	Candidate	FPv%	Count		
Party	Candidate	FPv%	1	2	3
UUP	Boyd Douglas	25.65%	1,072		
SDLP	Michael Coyle*	24.23%	1,013		
Sinn Féin	Malachy O'Kane	20.96%	876		
UUP	Max Gault*	9.78%	409	777.55	
SDLP	Gerard Lynch*	10.57%	442	443.05	739.06
Sinn Féin	Eddie-Jo Lynn	8.80%	368	368	384.5
Electorate: 6,447 Valid: 4,180 (64.84%) Spoilt: 76 Quota: 697 Turnout: 4,256 (66.02%)

== 1993 Election ==
1989: 2 x UUP, 2 x SDLP, 1 x Sinn Féin

1993: 2 x UUP, 2 x SDLP, 1 x Sinn Féin

1989–1993 Change: No change

Benbradagh - 5 seats
Party	Candidate	FPv%	Count				
Party	Candidate	FPv%	1	2	3	4	5
UUP	David Robinson*	26.86%	1,042				
SDLP	Michael Coyle	25.75%	999				
Sinn Féin	Thomas Donaghy*	20.68%	802				
UUP	Max Gault*	10.70%	415	800.32			
SDLP	Gerard Lynch*	7.58%	294	295.14	610.34	614.34	636.38
Sinn Féin	Kevin Kelly	8.43%	327	327.76	364.16	509.16	509.54
Electorate: 6,155 Valid: 3,879 (63.02%) Spoilt: 97 Quota: 647 Turnout: 3,976 (64.60%)

== 1989 Election ==
1985: 2 x UUP, 2 x Sinn Féin, 1 x SDLP

1989: 2 x UUP, 2 x SDLP, 1 x Sinn Féin

1985–1989 Change: SDLP gain from Sinn Féin

Benbradagh - 5 seats
Party	Candidate	FPv%	Count				
Party	Candidate	FPv%	1	2	3	4	5
SDLP	Lawrence Hegarty*	26.75%	987				
UUP	David Robinson*	25.45%	939				
Sinn Féin	Thomas Donaghy	21.49%	793				
UUP	Max Gault*	12.09%	446	446.84	768.84		
SDLP	Gerard Lynch	4.93%	182	523.04	523.74	528.8	542.1
Sinn Féin	Michael Hasson*	9.30%	343	368.62	368.62	533.3	533.65
Electorate: 5,745 Valid: 3,690 (64.23%) Spoilt: 104 Quota: 616 Turnout: 3,794 (66.04%)

== 1985 Election ==
1985: 2 x UUP, 2 x Sinn Féin, 1 x SDLP

Benbradagh - 5 seats
Party	Candidate	FPv%	Count					
Party	Candidate	FPv%	1	2	3	4	5	6
Sinn Féin	Michael McGonigle	22.58%	880					
UUP	David Robinson*	21.17%	825					
UUP	Max Gault*	8.62%	336	336	480.48			
SDLP	Lawrence Hegarty*	15.01%	585	598	598	599	811	
Sinn Féin	Michael Hasson	9.42%	367	564.6	564.6	565.6	598.42	624.42
Independent	Denis Farren*	10.37%	404	412.06	413.32	413.74	464.78	549.78
SDLP	James Brolly	8.11%	316	320.94	321.15	321.15		
DUP	John McKay	4.72%	184	184	208.99			
Electorate: 5,653 Valid: 3,897 (68.94%) Spoilt: 92 Quota: 650 Turnout: 3,989 (70.56%)
