= 2014 Causeway Coast and Glens Borough Council election =

Local government election in Northern Ireland

2014 Causeway Coast and Glens Council election
- 22 May 2014

All 40 council seats 21 seats needed for a majority
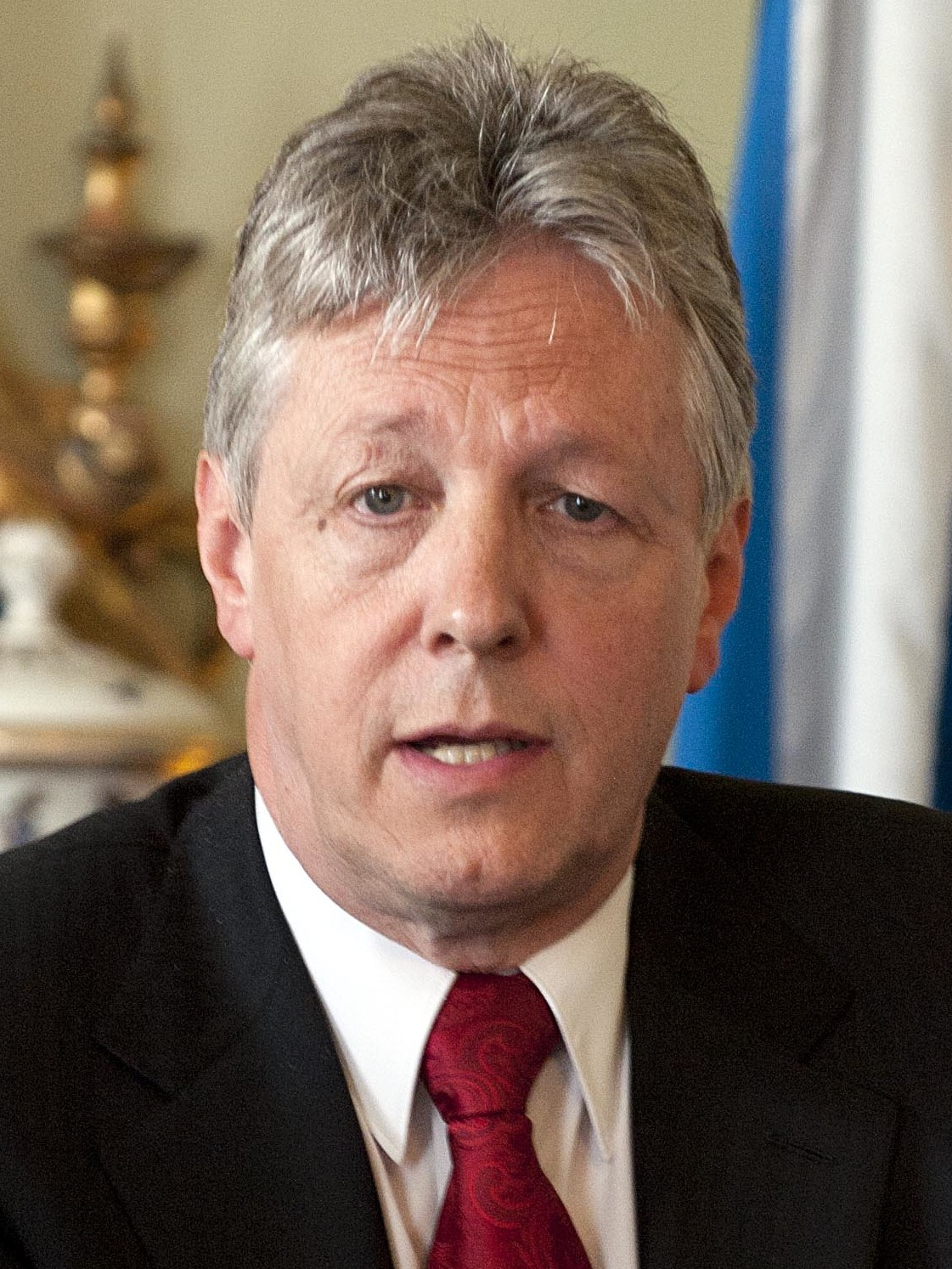

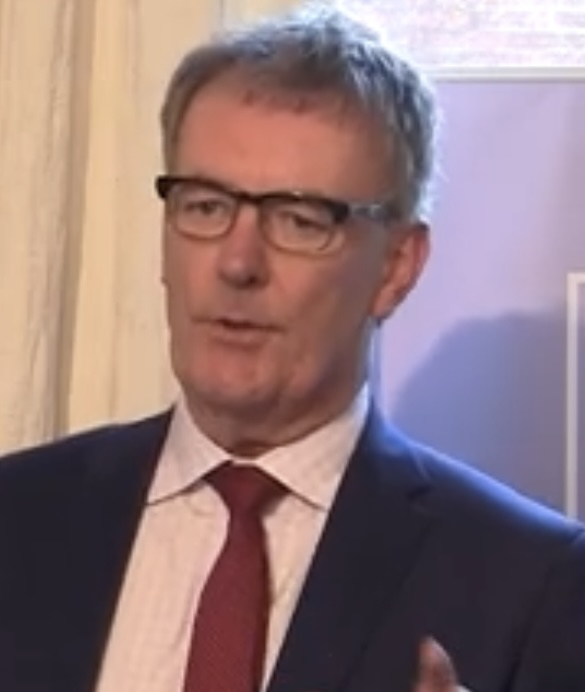

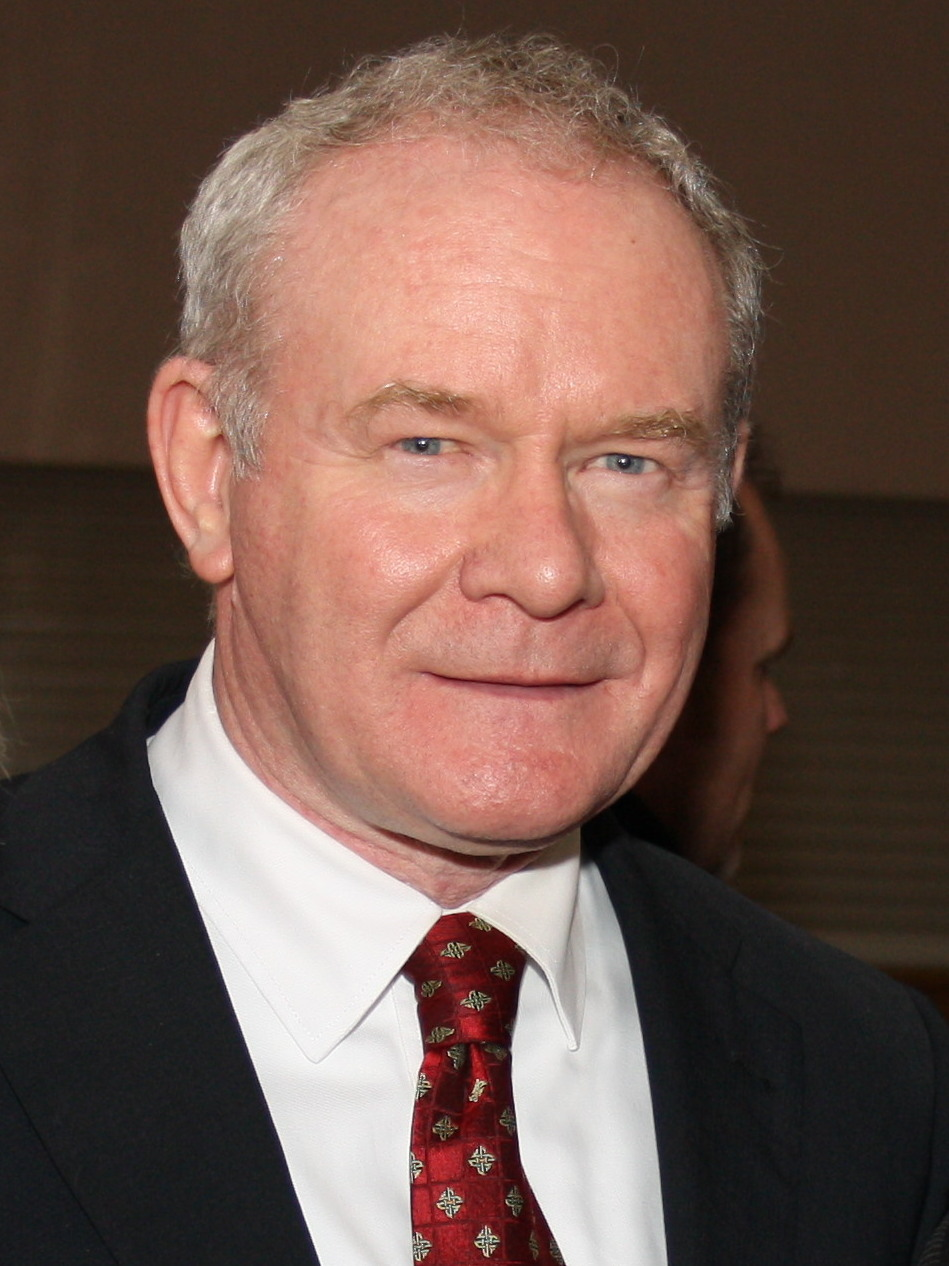

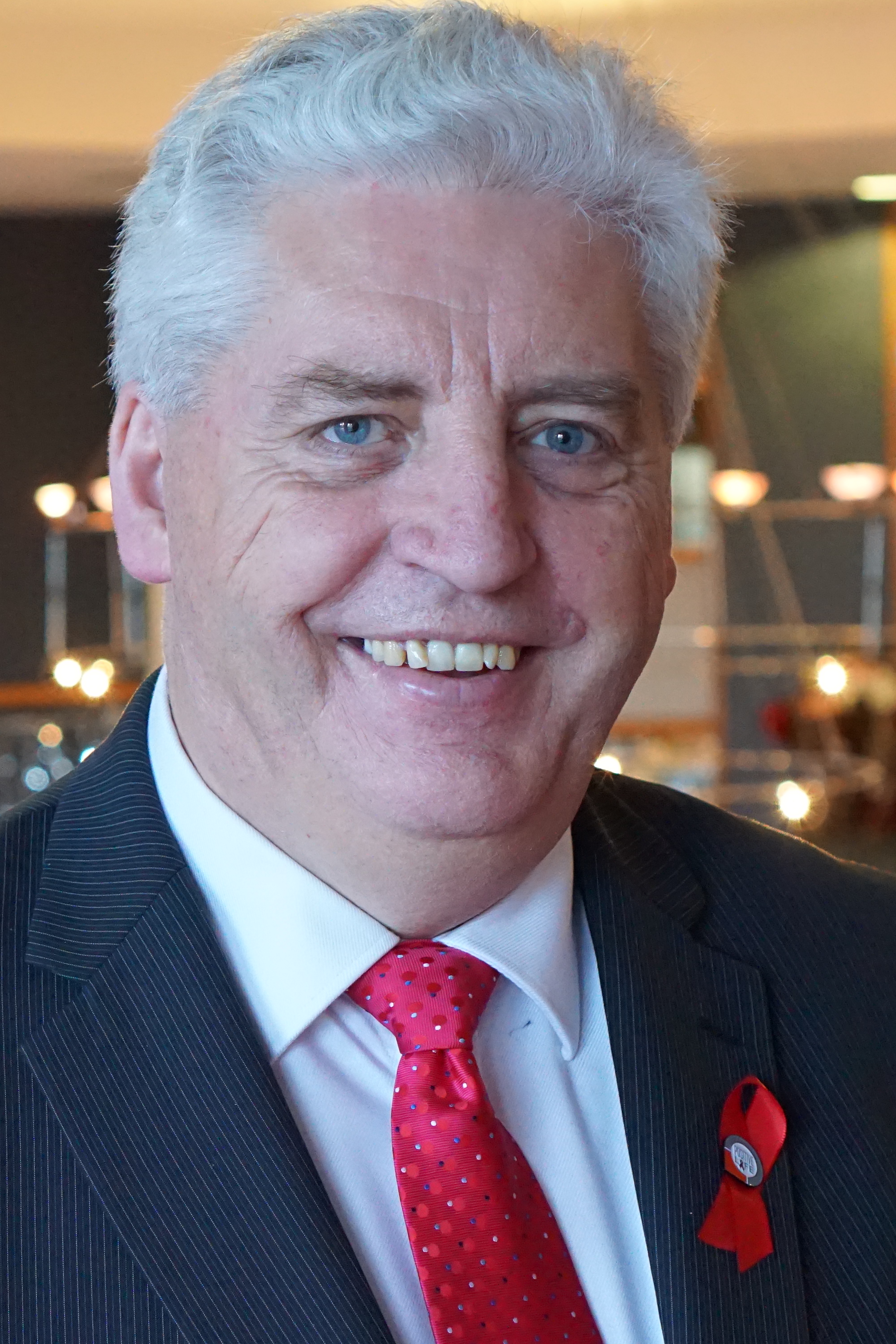

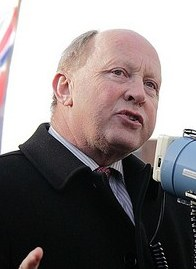

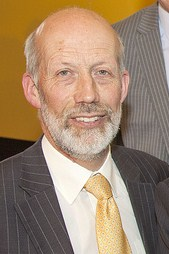
	First party	Second party	Third party
Leader	Peter Robinson	Mike Nesbitt	Martin McGuinness
Party	DUP	UUP	Sinn Féin
Seats won	11	10	7
Seat change	New council	New council	New council
	Fourth party	Fifth party	Sixth party
Leader	Alasdair McDonnell	Jim Allister	David Ford
Party	SDLP	TUV	Alliance
Seats won	6	3	1
Seat change	New council	New council	New council
	Seventh party	Eighth party
	PUP	Ind
Leader	Billy Hutchinson	-
Party	PUP	Independent
Seats won	1	1
Seat change	New council	New council
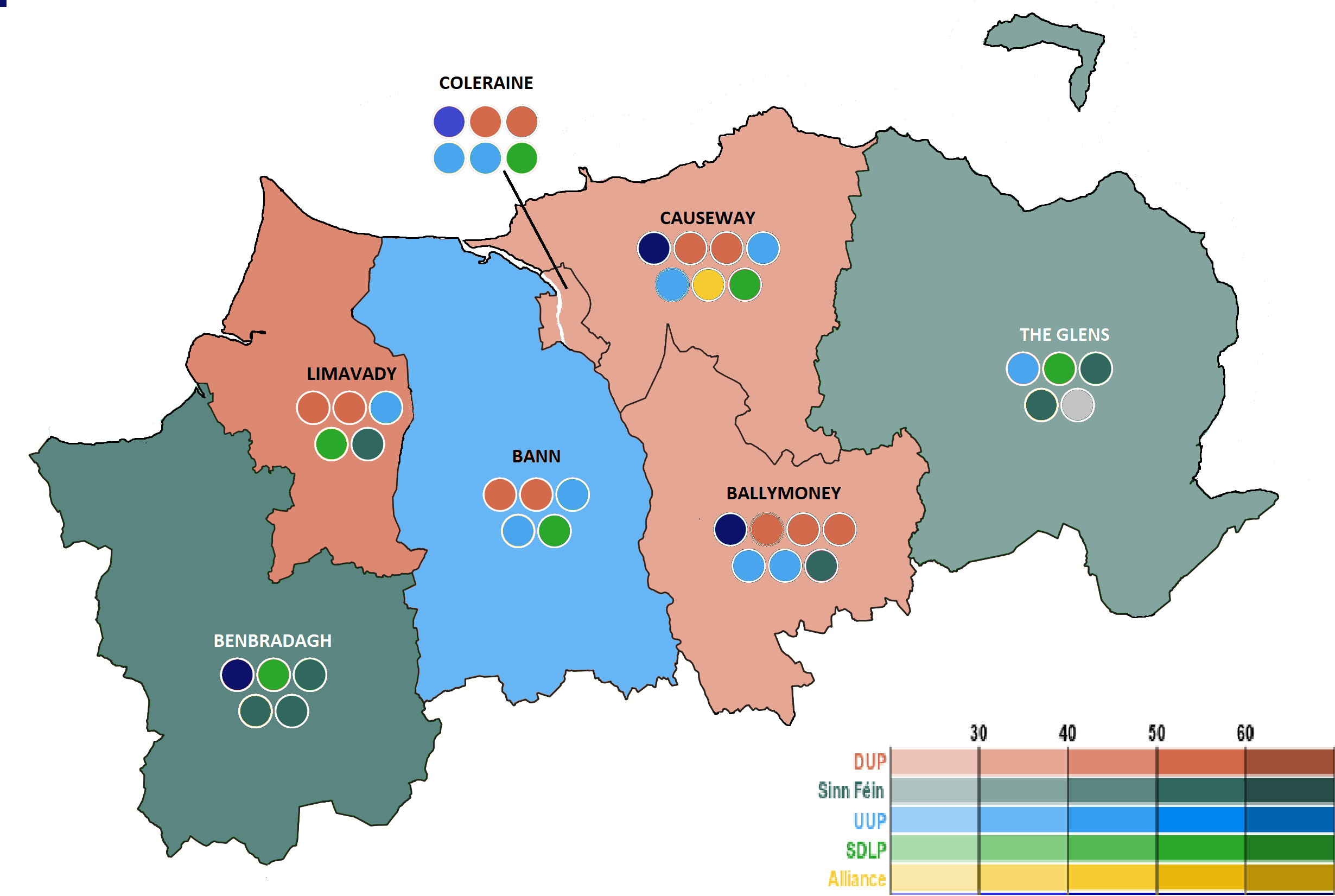
- Causeway Coast and Glens 2014 Council Election Results by DEA (Shaded by plurality of FPVs)

The first election to Causeway Coast and Glens District Council, part of the Northern Ireland local elections on 22 May 2014, returned 40 members to the newly formed council via Single Transferable Vote. The Democratic Unionist Party won a plurality of first-preference votes and seats.

== Election results ==
Party	Seats	±	First Pref. votes	FPv%	±%
DUP	11		12,582	26.95%	
UUP	10		8,071	17.29%	
Sinn Féin	7		9,313	19.95%	
SDLP	6		5,852	12.54%	
TUV	3		4,846	10.38%	
Independent	1		2,431	5.21%	
Alliance	1		1,821	3.90%	
PUP	1		777	1.66%	
UKIP	0		518	1.11%	
NI21	0		378	0.81%	
NI Conservatives	0		129	0.28%	
Totals	40		46,685	100.00%	—

== Districts summary ==
Results of the Causeway Coast and Glens District Council election, 2014 by district
Ward	%	Cllrs	%	Cllrs	%	Cllrs	%	Cllrs	%	Cllrs	%	Cllrs	%	Cllrs	%	Cllrs	Total Cllrs
Ward	DUP		UUP		Sinn Féin		SDLP		TUV		Alliance		PUP		Others		Total Cllrs
Ballymoney	33.1	3	16.7	2	18.9	1	5.9	0	17.9	1	3.7	0	0.0	0	3.8	0	7
Bann	29.1	2	30.5	2	15.1	0	13.3	1	8.4	0	3.6	0	0.0	0	0.0	0	5
Benbradagh	12.7	0	0.0	0	49.5	3	18.2	1	19.6	1	0.0	0	0.0	0	0.0	0	5
Causeway	31.2	2	25.6	2	0.0	0	9.4	1	10.1	1	10.5	1	0.0	0	13.2	0	7
Coleraine	33.2	2	18.0	2	5.8	0	11.0	1	5.0	0	6.2	0	11.8	1	9.0	0	6
Limavady	40.2	2	15.4	1	21.3	1	15.4	1	5.9	0	0.0	0	0.0	0	1.8	0	5
The Glens	7.6	0	10.4	1	35.2	2	18.7	1	3.5	0	2.0	0	0.0	0	22.6	1	5
Total	27.0	11	17.1	10	19.9	7	12.7	6	10.4	3	3.9	1	1.7	1	7.3	1	40

== District results ==
=== Ballymoney ===
2014: 3 x DUP, 2 x UUP, 1 x Sinn Féin, 1 x TUV

Ballymoney - 7 seats
Party	Candidate	FPv%	Count											
Party	Candidate	FPv%	1	2	3	4	5	6	7	8	9	10	11	12
DUP	John Finlay*	13.04%	1,075											
Sinn Féin	Philip McGuigan* †	11.41%	941	941	942	958	1,011	1,023	1,023	1,183				
TUV	William Blair*	10.26%	846	848.6	860.64	860.64	860.64	867.68	883.96	886.96	887.96	1,394.96		
DUP	Ian Stevenson*	7.19%	593	600.84	613.96	616.96	618.96	630.96	972.96	983	983	1,020.64	1,107.76	
UUP	Darryl Wilson*	9.14%	754	755.4	776.48	777.48	777.48	813.48	837.8	853.8	853.8	870.92	952.76	965.96
UUP	Tom McKeown*	7.53%	621	623.92	654.92	655.92	657.96	724	745.2	765.2	767.2	801.64	905.48	913.40
DUP	Alan McLean*	6.40%	528	540.32	552.36	555.36	556.36	572.36	685.44	690.44	691.44	733.04	821.92	869.44
Sinn Féin	Leanne Peacock	7.46%	615	615	615	621	653	662	662	767	859	860.04	860.04	860.04
TUV	Jamise McIlhagga	7.66%	632	634.12	635.12	636.12	637.12	644.12	664.28	666.28				
SDLP	Harry Boyle	4.05%	334	334.08	337.08	428.08	500.08	569.08	569.12					
DUP	Jonathan Wallace	6.43%	530	542.16	542.2	542.2	542.2	550.24						
Alliance	Stephen McFarland	3.69%	304	304.24	326.24	340.24	348.24							
Independent	Charley O'Kane	2.38%	196	196.04	199.04	207.04								
SDLP	Angela Mulholland	1.81%	149	149	150									
NI Conservatives	James Simpson	1.56%	129	129.36										
Electorate: 16,836 Valid: 8,247 (48.98%) Spoilt: 115 Quota: 1,031 Turnout: 8,362 (49.67%)

=== Bann ===
2014: 2 x UUP, 2 x DUP, 1 x SDLP

Bann - 5 seats
Party	Candidate	FPv%	Count					
Party	Candidate	FPv%	1	2	3	4	5	6
UUP	William King*	17.13%	1,127					
DUP	Michelle Knight-McQuillan*	15.58%	1,025	1,166				
UUP	Richard Holmes*	13.38%	880	1,140				
DUP	Sam Cole*	13.56%	892	1,063	1,127.66			
SDLP	Róisín Loftus*	13.30%	875	981	984.66	1,023.36	1,030.07	1,057.79
Sinn Féin	Ciaran Archibald*	15.11%	994	1,010	1,010	1,014.3	1,014.3	1,015.84
TUV	Elizabeth Collins	8.36%	550					
Alliance	Charlie McConaghy	3.57%	235					
Electorate: 12,175 Valid: 6,578 (54.03%) Spoilt: 77 Quota: 1,097 Turnout: 6,655 (54.66%)

=== Benbradagh ===
2014: 3 x Sinn Féin, 1 x TUV, 1 x SDLP

Benbradagh - 5 seats
Party	Candidate	FPv%	Count				
Party	Candidate	FPv%	1	2	3	4	5
Sinn Féin	Seán McGlinchey*	24.31%	1,460				
TUV	Boyd Douglas*	19.62%	1,160				
Sinn Féin	Tony McCaul*	10.69%	632	982.13	1,038.13		
SDLP	Orla Beattie*	11.60%	686	696.89	991.89		
Sinn Féin	Dermot Nicholl*	14.09%	833	904.61	930.79	932.29	959.29
DUP	Edgar Scott*	12.68%	750	750.99	751.99	915.79	915.79
SDLP	Michael Coyle*	6.63%	392	428.96			
Electorate: 11,904 Valid: 5,913 (49.67%) Spoilt: 92 Quota: 986 Turnout: 6,005 (50.45%)

=== Causeway ===
2014: 2 x DUP, 2 x UUP, 1 x TUV, 1 x Alliance, 1 x SDLP

Causeway - 7 seats
Party	Candidate	FPv%	Count									
Party	Candidate	FPv%	1	2	3	4	5	6	7	8	9	10
DUP	Frank Campbell*	12.28%	910	915	945							
DUP	Mark Fielding*	8.68%	643	647	655	666.16	702.16	884.16	923.16	940.16		
Alliance	Barney Fitzpatrick* †	10.06%	745	745	756	757.24	766.24	767.24	841.24	934.24		
UUP	Sandra Hunter*	10.28%	762	767	786	787.86	804.86	813.86	831.86	862.86	1,025.86	
UUP	Norman Hillis*	9.03%	669	671	679	679	707	712	749	773	983	
TUV	Sharon McKillop ‡	8.31%	616	721	773	773.62	830.62	834.62	845.62	865.62	895.62	923.17
SDLP	Maura Hickey*†	9.43%	699	699	699	699	708	709	733	802	813	827.25
DUP	Bill Kennedy*	6.71%	497	504	522	523.86	532.86	592.86	601.86	613.86	665.86	722.86
UUP	Robert McPherson	6.26%	464	471	475	475.62	488.62	496.62	499.62	525.62		
Independent	Alison Torrens	3.81%	282	283	307	307	320	320	363			
NI21	David Alexander	3.58%	265	265	277	277.62	290.62	291.62				
DUP	Angela Knott	3.51%	260	263	264	264	280					
UKIP	Adrian Parke	3.09%	229	244	252	252						
Independent	Leanne Abernethy	2.79%	207	211								
TUV	Thomas Stirling	2.17%	161									
Electorate: 16,548 Valid: 7,409 (44.77%) Spoilt: 99 Quota: 927 Turnout: 7,508 (45.37%)

=== Coleraine ===
2014: 2 x DUP, 2 x UUP, 1 x PUP, 1 x SDLP

Coleraine - 6 seats
Party	Candidate	FPv%	Count									
Party	Candidate	FPv%	1	2	3	4	5	6	7	8	9	10
PUP	Russell Watton	11.84%	777	779	812	938						
SDLP	Stephanie Quigley*	10.99%	721	734	745	755	758	1,016				
DUP	George Duddy*	10.82%	710	712	728	752	813	815	1,041			
UUP	William McCandless*	9.77%	641	654	674	698	756	758	772	773.84	837.84	847.84
DUP	Trevor Clarke*	9.56%	627	629	645	664	727	728	783	847.86	878.32	881.32
UUP	David Harding ‡‡	8.22%	539	546	557	571	634	637	661	662.38	747.38	760.38
DUP	Tracy Craig	7.36%	483	483	490	505	553	557	621	653.66	674.66	677.66
Alliance	Yvonne Boyle*	6.22%	408	450	460	474	482	520	527	527.46		
DUP	Phyllis Fielding*	5.49%	360	363	368	384	409	410				
Sinn Féin	Margaret Fleming	5.84%	383	384	387	389	389					
TUV	Tommy Collins	4.98%	327	328	360	378						
Independent	Billy Ellis	4.33%	284	288	300							
UKIP	William Ogilby	2.85%	187	200								
NI21	Chris McCaw	1.72%	113									
Electorate: 15,443 Valid: 6,560 (42.48%) Spoilt: 79 Quota: 938 Turnout: 6,639 (42.99%)

=== Limavady ===
2014: 2 x DUP, 1 x Sinn Féin, 1 x UUP, 1 x SDLP

Limavady - 5 seats
Party	Candidate	FPv%	Count									
Party	Candidate	FPv%	1	2	3	4	5	6	7	8	9	10
DUP	Alan Robinson*	26.43%	1,451									
DUP	James McCorkell*	8.41%	462	840.88	859.1	864.1	1,105.1					
Sinn Féin	Brenda Chivers*	14.51%	797	797	798	843.74	843.74	843.74	1,177.74			
SDLP	Gerry Mullan*†	10.49%	576	582.66	591.4	778.4	782.51	783.51	820.88	1,013.88		
UUP	Aaron Callan ‡	8.23%	452	485.3	500.04	507.15	546.72	607.72	608.09	608.09	610.09	815.11
UUP	Raymond Kennedy	7.18%	394	408.8	416.17	418.17	446.38	521.38	521.38	522.38	528.38	682.3
Sinn Féin	Rory Donaghy*	6.77%	372	373.11	373.11	381.11	382.11	382.11				
TUV	Howard Gordon	5.92%	325	343.87	366.98	370.72	390.71					
DUP	Jonathan Holmes	5.32%	292	353.79	362.53	365.53						
SDLP	Jason Allen	4.88%	268	270.96	276.96							
UKIP	Richard Nicholl	1.86%	102	109.03								
Electorate: 10,998 Valid: 5,491 (49.93%) Spoilt: 88 Quota: 916 Turnout: 5,579 (50.73%)

=== The Glens ===
2014: 2 x Sinn Féin, 1 x SDLP, 1 x UUP, 1 x Independent

The Glens - 5 seats
Party	Candidate	FPv%	Count							
Party	Candidate	FPv%	1	2	3	4	5	6	7	8
UUP	Joan Baird*	10.41%	675	700	813	842	1,268			
Sinn Féin	Cara McShane*	12.93%	839	846	856	957	958	958	1,273	
SDLP	Margaret Anne McKillop*	8.56%	555	563	616	831	841	866	1,064	1,091.3
Independent	Padraig McShane*	12.87%	835	845	852	919	921	926	1,008	1,023.6
Sinn Féin	Kieran Mulholland	11.48%	745	747	773	780	782	782	864	1,008.3
Independent	Ambrose Laverty	9.67%	627	654	664	798	824	886	904	907.25
Sinn Féin	Colum Thompson*	10.82%	702	702	702	706	706	706		
DUP	Evelyne Robinson*	7.62%	494	497	589	592				
SDLP	Donal Cunningham*	7.91%	513	534	580					
TUV	Cyril Quigg	3.53%	229	231						
SDLP	Joanne McKeown	2.20%	143	147						
Alliance	Colin Mayrs	2.00%	130							
Electorate: 12,011 Valid: 6,487 (54.01%) Spoilt: 63 Quota: 1,082 Turnout: 6,550 (54.53%)

* Incumbent

== Changes during the term ==
=== † Co-options ===
Date	Electoral Area	Party	Outgoing	Co-optee	Reason
3 Jun 2016	Limavady	SDLP	Gerry Mullan	John Deighan	Mullan was elected to the Assembly in 2016.
19 Sep 2016	Ballymoney	Sinn Féin	Philip McGuigan	Cathal McLaughlin	McGuigan was co-opted to the Assembly.
22 Jan 2018	Causeway	SDLP	Maura Hickey	Angela Mulholland	Hickey resigned her seat.
30 May 2018	Benbradagh	Sinn Féin	Tony McCaul	Kathleen McGurk	McCaul resigned.
4 Jun 2018	Causeway	Alliance	Barney Fitzpatrick	Chris McCaw	Fitzpatrick died.

=== ‡ Changes of affiliation ===
Date	Electoral Area	Name	Previous affiliation	New affiliation	Circumstance
24 Feb 2015	Coleraine	David Harding	UUP	Independent	Resigned
Apr 2016	Coleraine	David Harding	Independent	NI Conservatives	Affiliated
26 Oct 2016	Limavady	Aaron Callan	UUP	DUP	Defected
23 Nov 2018	Causeway	Sharon McKillop	TUV	DUP	Defected

Last updated 24 March 2019.
