= Michael Coyle =

Northern Irish politician (born 1948)

Member of Causeway Coast and Glens Borough Council
- Incumbent
- Assumed office 18 May 2023
- Preceded by: Orla Beattie
- Constituency: Benbradagh

Member of Limavady Borough Council
- In office 19 May 1993 – 22 May 2014
- Preceded by: Lawrence Hegarty
- Succeeded by: Council abolished
- Constituency: Benbradagh

Member of the Northern Ireland Assembly for East Londonderry
- In office 1 September 2002 – 26 November 2003
- Preceded by: Arthur Doherty
- Succeeded by: Francie Brolly

Personal details
- Born: 5 August 1948 (age 77) Dungiven, Northern Ireland
- Party: Social Democratic and Labour Party

Michael Coyle (born 5 August 1948) is a Social Democratic and Labour Party (SDLP) politician in Northern Ireland, serving as a Causeway Coast and Glens Councillor for the Benbradagh DEA since 2023. Coyle was a Member of the Northern Ireland Assembly (MLA) for East Londonderry from 2002 to 2003.

== Background ==
Born in Dungiven, Coyle attended St Columb's College in Derry and the Belfast College of Technology. He worked as a telephone engineer for British Telecom, and was elected to Limavady Borough Council in the 1993 local elections, for the Benbradagh District, as an SDLP representative.

In 1996 he was an unsuccessful candidate in the Northern Ireland Forum election in East Londonderry. Following the resignation of Northern Ireland Assembly member Arthur Doherty on 1 September 2002, Coyle was co-opted on to the body, representing East Londonderry. He stood in the constituency in the 2003 Assembly election, but was not elected.

Coyle retained his council seat in the 2005 and 2011 elections, but lost his seat on the newly-formed Causeway Coast and Glens Borough Council at the 2014 election. He was elected back to the council for Benbradagh at the 2023 local elections.

Northern Ireland Assembly
Preceded by Arthur Doherty	MLA for Londonderry, East; 2002–2003	Succeeded by Francie Brolly
