= Gerry Mullan (politician) =

Politician from Northern Ireland

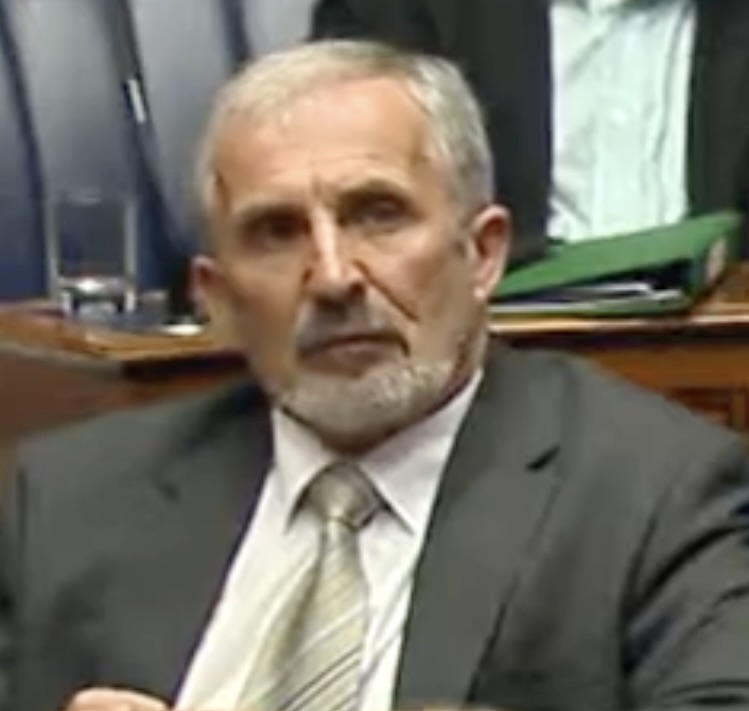
- Mullan in 2016

Member of the Northern Ireland Assembly for East Londonderry
- In office 5 May 2016 – 26 January 2017
- Preceded by: John Dallat
- Succeeded by: John Dallat

Member of Causeway Coast and Glens Borough Council
- In office 22 May 2014 – 5 May 2016
- Preceded by: New council
- Succeeded by: John Deighan
- Constituency: Limavady

Mayor of Limavady
- In office 2013–2014

Member of Limavady Borough Council
- In office 5 May 2005 – 22 May 2014
- Preceded by: Desmond Lowry
- Succeeded by: Council abolished
- Constituency: Limavady Town
- In office 7 June 2001 – 5 May 2005
- Preceded by: Arthur Doherty
- Succeeded by: John McElhinney
- Constituency: Bellarena

Personal details
- Born: 24 September 1954 (age 71) Limavady, County Londonderry, Northern Ireland
- Party: Independent (2017)
- Other political affiliations: SDLP (Until 2017)

Gerry Mullan (born 24 September 1954) is a former Social Democratic and Labour Party (SDLP) politician from Limavady, County Londonderry, Northern Ireland. He was a Member of the Legislative Assembly (MLA) for East Londonderry from 2016 until 2017, when he was deselected by the SDLP in favour of John Dallat, who returned to politics following a short retirement.

== Political career ==
Mullan was first elected as a councillor to Limavady Borough Council in 2001 representing the Bellarena ward for the Social Democratic and Labour Party. He served on the council for thirteen years and was appointed as the last Mayor of Limavady in 2014. In 2014, Limavady Borough Council was merged with Ballymoney Borough Council, Coleraine Borough Council and Moyle District Council to become Causeway Coast and Glens Borough Council; Mullan won a seat on the new council.

At the 2015 United Kingdom general election, Mullan was selected to represent the SDLP standing for election in East Londonderry. However, he lost to the incumbent Democratic Unionist Party's Gregory Campbell. In 2016, Mullan was selected to stand for the Northern Ireland Assembly in East Londonderry, taking over from John Dallat, who was retiring. Mullan was elected to the Assembly and managed to retain the seat for the SDLP. He resigned his seat on the council as a result in order to take up the role as an MLA. However, Dallat announced he would be returning to politics after seven months of retirement and following an SDLP selection hearing, Dallat was selected to be the SDLP's only candidate in East Londonderry ahead of Mullan at the next Assembly election in a move supported by the SDLP leader Colum Eastwood.

After being deselected by the SDLP, Mullan announced he was quitting the party after twenty years of membership and looking to take legal action, citing his deselection, believing his local constituency should have decided, not the central party, and stating that the SDLP was no longer the party he had joined. The media viewed this as part of a personal feud between Mullan and Dallat. Supporters of Mullan put up posters around County Londonderry alleging Dallat was enriching himself by him taking retirement severance and running again after such a short retirement period, though Mullan himself had not endorsed this action. Dallat's daughter, Helena Dallat O'Driscoll, took Mullan to an employment tribunal, alleging he had discriminated against her on marital and gender grounds by refusing to employ her in his constituency office. The case was dismissed, however, after Dallat's daughter failed to pay the £200 court fee. Mullan announced his intention to stand in the 2017 Assembly elections as an independent to try to retain his seat but was not elected.

Northern Ireland Assembly
Preceded by John Dallat	MLA for East Londonderry; 2016–2017	Succeeded by John Dallat
