= George Robinson (Northern Ireland politician) =

Northern Irish unionist politician

George Robinson MBE
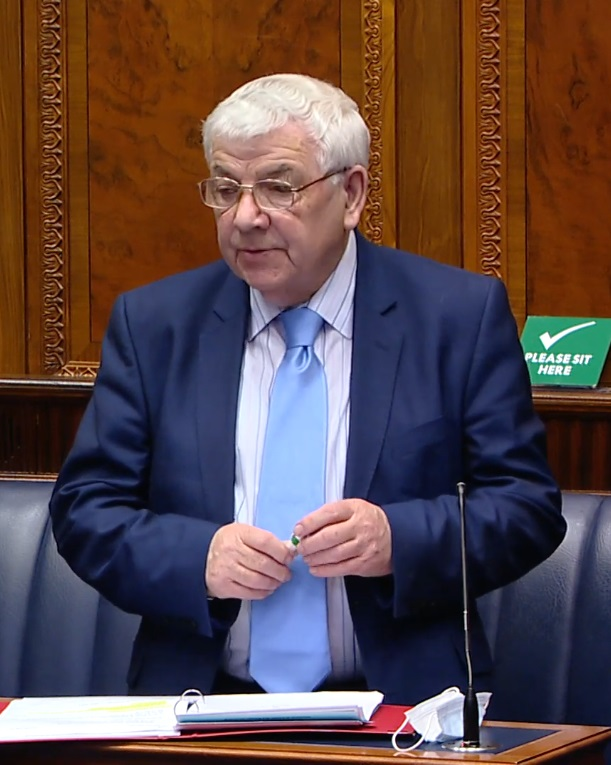
- Robinson in 2021

Member of the Northern Ireland Assembly for Londonderry, East
- In office 26 November 2003 – 28 March 2022
- Preceded by: Pauline Armitage
- Succeeded by: Alan Robinson

Mayor of Limavady
- In office 2002–2003
- Succeeded by: Anne Brolly

Limavady Borough Councillor
- In office 5 May 2011 – 4 December 2013
- Preceded by: Leslie Cubitt
- Succeeded by: Edgar Scott
- Constituency: Bellarena
- In office 15 May 1985 – 5 May 2011
- Preceded by: District established
- Succeeded by: James McCorkell
- Constituency: Limavady Town

Personal details
- Born: 30 May 1941 (age 85) Limavady, County Londonderry, Northern Ireland
- Party: Democratic Unionist Party
- Spouse: Ann Robinson (m. 1967)
- Website: Robinson DUP

George Robinson MBE (born 30 May 1941) is a former Democratic Unionist Party (DUP) politician and civil servant who was a Member of the Northern Ireland Assembly (MLA) for East Londonderry from 2003 until 2022. He was also elected as a Limavady Borough Councillor in 1985, where he served for nearly 30 years, before stepping down in 2013.

== Life and career ==
Robinson was born in Limavady, County Londonderry to Joe, a soldier in both World War I and World War II, and Jane Robinson. George is the eldest of eight siblings; he has five brothers and two sisters. His father died of tuberculosis in 1964 and his mother at a "fairly young" age, leaving George to look after his siblings.

He was educated at Limavady Technical College. During the Troubles, he served in the army barracks.

Robinson was first elected to Limavady Borough Council in the 1985 local elections, representing Limavady Town.

Robinson was elected Mayor of Limavady Borough Council in June 2002. Robinson welcomed a visit from the Queen and Duke of Edinburgh, saying, "Last Tuesday and Wednesday were special days in Northern Ireland".

In 2003, Robinson was elected to the Northern Ireland Assembly as one of two DUP representatives for the East Londonderry constituency.

In 2004, he suffered a serious heart attack and subsequently underwent a double heart bypass.

Robinson stood down as a councillor in December 2013, and was succeeded by Edgar Scott.

On 17 March 2022, citing his age as a factor, Robinson announced that he would be retiring as an MLA at the 2022 Assembly election In a statement, he said: "At the last election I contested in 2017 and at the ripe old age of 75 it was said by a Nationalist opponent; 'when will we ever get rid of Robinson?' Well, the time has now arrived for this Robinson to move on, only by virtue of retirement, but like Unionism across the Province, I bow out unbroken, and I bow out undefeated."

Political offices
Preceded by ???	Mayor of Limavady; 2002–2003	Succeeded by Anne Brolly
Northern Ireland Assembly
Preceded by Pauline Armitage	MLA for East Londonderry; 2003–2022	Succeeded by Alan Robinson
