= Limavady Borough Council =

Former local council in Northern Ireland

Coordinates: 55.051°N 6.951°W

Limavady Borough: Buirg Léim an Mhadaidh
- Area: 586 km^{2} (226 sq mi); Ranked 10th of 26
- District HQ: Limavady
- Catholic: 56.6%
- Protestant: 41.6%
- Country: Northern Ireland
- Sovereign state: United Kingdom
- Councillors: MLAs East Londonderry DUP: 2 Independent: 1 Sinn Féin: 1 SDLP: 1; MPs Gregory Campbell (DUP)
- Website: www.limavady.gov.uk

Limavady Borough Council (Irish: Comhairle Bhuirg Léim an Mhadaidh) was a local government body in Northern Ireland. In May 2015 it merged with Coleraine Borough Council, Ballymoney Borough Council and Moyle District Council under local government reorganisation in Northern Ireland to become Causeway Coast and Glens District Council.

Its headquarters were in the town of Limavady, although 63% of the population lived in a rural setting. It covered an area of 586 square kilometres and included the valley of the River Roe. It stretched from the Sperrin Mountains in the south to Benone beach, a seven-mile strand on the Atlantic coast which was the first beach in Northern Ireland to be awarded a Blue Flag. Apart from Limavady other towns in the area included Dungiven and Ballykelly.

The Limavady Borough Council area consisted of three electoral areas: Limavady Town, Benbradagh and Bellarena. The council was established in 1973 and was made up of 15 members who were elected (normally for a four-year term) using a single transferable vote system.

Together with the neighbouring district of Coleraine, it formed the East Londonderry constituency for elections to the Westminster Parliament and Northern Ireland Assembly.

At the last election in 2011 members from the following political parties were elected: 6 Sinn Féin, 3 Social Democratic and Labour Party (SDLP), 3 Democratic Unionist Party (DUP), 2 Ulster Unionist Party (UUP) and 1 Traditional Unionist Voice (TUV). The posts of Mayor and Deputy Mayor were usually rotated annually among the political representatives of the two main traditions within the community as part of the partnership process operated by the council. In June 2013, the Mayor was Councillor Gerry Mullan (SDLP) and the Deputy Mayor was Councillor James McCorkell (DUP).

== 2011 Election results ==
Map of the borough's DEAs from 1993 to 2014

Party		seats	change +/-
•	Sinn Féin	6	=
•	Social Democratic and Labour Party	3	=
•	Democratic Unionist Party	3	=
•	Ulster Unionist Party	2	=
•	Traditional Unionist Voice	1	+1*

- Boyd Douglas, elected as a TUV councillor, had previously held the seat under other designations, most recently (until early 2011) as a United Unionist Coalition representative.

== Review of Public Administration ==
Under the Review of Public Administration (RPA) the council was due to merge with Coleraine Borough Council, Ballymoney Borough Council and Moyle District Council in 2011 to form Causeway Coast and Glens District Council, a single council for the enlarged area totalling 1796 km^{2} and a population of 131,564. The next election was due to take place in May 2009, but on 25 April 2008, Shaun Woodward, Secretary of State for Northern Ireland announced that the district council elections were to be postponed until the introduction of the eleven new councils in 2011. In the event, progress towards implementing the RPA stalled, and as the 26 councils remained in existence in 2011 elections were held in May to those bodies for what was expected to be their final term.

== Population ==
The area covered by Limavady Borough Council had a population of 33,536 residents according to the 2011 Northern Ireland census.

== See also ==
- Local councils in Northern Ireland
