= 2005 Coleraine Borough Council election =

Local government election in Northern Ireland

← 2001	5 May 2005	2011 →

All 22 seats to Coleraine Borough Council 12 seats needed for a majority
	First party	Second party	Third party
Party	DUP	UUP	SDLP
Seats won	9	8	3
Seat change	▲2	▼2	▼1
	Fourth party	Fifth party
Party	Sinn Féin	Independent
Seats won	1	1
Seat change	▲1	0
- Party with the most votes by district.

Elections to Coleraine Borough Council were held on 5 May 2005 on the same day as the other Northern Irish local government elections. The election used four district electoral areas to elect a total of 22 councillors.

== Election results ==
Coleraine Borough Council Election Result 2005
Party	Seats	Gains	Losses	Net gain/loss	Seats %	Votes %	Votes	+/−
DUP	9	2	0	▲2	40.9	36.9	8,142	▲9.4
UUP	8	0	2	▼2	36.4	32.0	7,061	▼4.0
SDLP	3	0	1	▼1	13.6	12.3	2,710	▼7.4
Sinn Féin	1	1	0	▲1	4.5	7.9	1,734	▲7.9
Independent	1	0	0	0	4.5	6.3	1,388	▼3.4
Alliance	0	0	0	0	0.0	4.7	1,026	▼1.7

Note: "Votes" are the first preference votes.

== Districts summary ==
Results of the Coleraine Borough Council election, 2005 by district
Ward	%	Cllrs	%	Cllrs	%	Cllrs	%	Cllrs	%	Cllrs	%	Cllrs	Total Cllrs
Ward	DUP		UUP		SDLP		Sinn Féin		Alliance		Others		Total Cllrs
Bann	34.0	2	33.6	2	19.6	1	12.8	1	0.0	0	0.0	0	6
Coleraine Central	33.8	2	37.6	3	10.9	1	5.7	0	6.1	0	5.9	0	6
Coleraine East	57.5	3	29.2	2	5.7	0	3.0	0	4.6	0	0.0	0	5
The Skerries	28.1	2	24.4	1	8.9	1	7.5	0	9.7	0	21.4	1	5
Total	36.9	9	32.0	8	12.3	3	7.9	1	4.7	0	6.2	1	22

== District results ==
=== Bann ===
2001: 3 x UUP, 2 x SDLP, 1 x DUP
2005: 2 x DUP, 2 x UUP, 1 x Sinn Féin, 1 x SDLP
2001-2005 Change: DUP and Sinn Féin gain from UUP and SDLP

Bann - 6 seats
Party	Candidate	FPv%	Count				
Party	Candidate	FPv%	1	2	3	4	5
SDLP	John Dallat*	12.88%	901	1,326			
Sinn Féin	Billy Leonard	12.79%	895	925	1,161		
DUP	Sam Cole*	11.68%	817	817	817	818	1,175
DUP	Adrian McQuillan*	14.10%	986	986	988	990	1,139
UUP	William King*	12.77%	893	896	907	912	949
UUP	Olive Church*	13.12%	918	920	924	933	947
UUP	William Watt*	7.75%	542	544	570	601	609
DUP	Mark Fielding	8.19%	573	573	574	574	
SDLP	Eamon Mullan*	6.72%	470				
Electorate: 10,299 Valid: 6,995 (67.92%) Spoilt: 121 Quota: 1,000 Turnout: 7,116 (69.09%)

=== Coleraine Central ===
2001: 3 x UUP, 2 x DUP, 1 x SDLP
2005: 3 x UUP, 2 x DUP, 1 x SDLP
2001-2005 Change: No change

Coleraine Central - 6 seats
Party	Candidate	FPv%	Count						
Party	Candidate	FPv%	1	2	3	4	5	6	7
UUP	David McClarty*	23.18%	1,478						
DUP	James McClure*	16.68%	1,064						
DUP	Timothy Deans*	14.36%	916						
SDLP	Gerry McLaughlin*	10.88%	694	716.23	719.23	722.27	1,013.27		
UUP	Elizabeth Johnston*	7.39%	471	781.05	828.46	884.89	889.28	890.2	1,014.2
UUP	David Barbour*	7.04%	449	608.9	649.14	697.21	702.21	704.51	850.08
Alliance	Eamon O'Hara	6.05%	386	415.25	422.03	425.26	442.65	538.33	555.68
Independent	Russell Watton	5.96%	380	395.21	418.99	455.09	455.67	456.13	
Sinn Féin	Kevin Darragh	5.74%	366	367.56	367.56	367.75			
DUP	Adrian Parke	2.71%	173	193.28					
Electorate: 11,309 Valid: 6,377 (56.39%) Spoilt: 101 Quota: 912 Turnout: 6,478 (57.28%)

=== Coleraine East ===
2001: 3 x DUP, 2 x UUP
2005: 3 x DUP, 2 x UUP
2001-2005 Change: No change

Coleraine East - 6 seats
Party	Candidate	FPv%	Count						
Party	Candidate	FPv%	1	2	3	4	5	6	7
DUP	Maurice Bradley*	34.99%	1,395						
DUP	William Creelman*	15.78%	629	1,217.3					
DUP	Phyllis Fielding*	6.70%	267	338.55	862.05				
UUP	Elizabeth Black*	10.46%	417	437.14	443.14	506.04	507.04	560.02	623.29
UUP	Robert McPherson*	10.43%	416	441.44	451.44	494.73	495.73	523.1	573
UUP	David Harding	8.28%	330	342.19	350.69	431.72	432.72	464.83	507.26
SDLP	John Montgomery	5.69%	227	229.12	229.12	232.82	333.82	396.72	
Alliance	Yvonne Boyle	4.64%	185	186.06	188.06	193.24	199.24		
Sinn Féin	Maria O'Neill	3.03%	121	121	121.5	121.5			
Electorate: 7,735 Valid: 3,987 (51.54%) Spoilt: 89 Quota: 65 Turnout: 4,076 (52.70%)

=== The Skerries ===
2001: 2 x UUP, 1 x DUP, 1 x SDLP, 1 x Independent
2005: 2 x DUP, 1 x UUP, 1 x SDLP, 1 x Independent
2001-2005 Change: DUP gain from UUP

The Skerries - 5 seats
Party	Candidate	FPv%	Count					
Party	Candidate	FPv%	1	2	3	4	5	6
Independent	Christine Alexander*	17.99%	846					
DUP	Robert Stewart*	16.44%	773	778	779	786.92		
UUP	Norman Hillis*	14.82%	697	733	737	749.72	1,065.72	
SDLP	Maura Hickey	8.89%	418	441	698	706.08	718.56	734.56
DUP	Sandy Gilkinson	11.68%	549	557	557	561.72	634.2	733.2
Alliance	Barney Fitzpatrick	9.68%	455	500	540	560.16	613.88	706.88
UUP	Stephen Barr	9.57%	450	477	479	486.76		
Sinn Féin	Valerie Leonard	7.49%	352	356				
Independent	Barbara Dempsey	3.45%	162					
Electorate: 8,162 Valid: 4,702 (57.61%) Spoilt: 65 Quota: 784 Turnout: 4,767 (58.40%)
