= Alan Robinson (Northern Irish politician) =

Northern Irish politician

Alan Robinson MLA
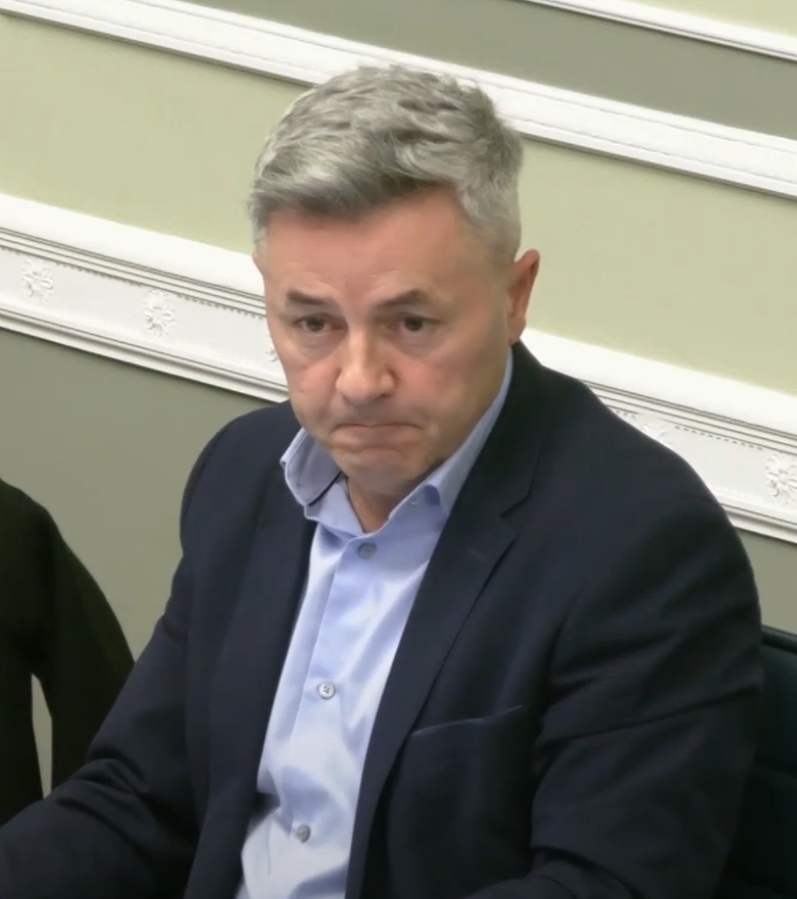
- Robinson in 2025

Member of the Northern Ireland Assembly for East Londonderry
- Incumbent
- Assumed office 5 May 2022
- Preceded by: George Robinson

Member of Causeway Coast and Glens Borough Council
- In office 22 May 2014 – 5 May 2022
- Preceded by: Council created
- Succeeded by: Steve Callaghan
- Constituency: Limavady

Member of Limavady Borough Council
- In office 5 May 2005 – 22 May 2014
- Preceded by: John Dolan
- Succeeded by: Council abolished
- Constituency: Limavady Town

Personal details
- Born: Limavady, Northern Ireland
- Party: Democratic Unionist Party
- Occupation: Politician

Alan Robinson is a Democratic Unionist Party (DUP) politician, serving as a Member of the Legislative Assembly (MLA) for East Londonderry since 2022. Robinson was a Causeway Coast and Glens Councillor for the Limavady DEA from 2014 to 2022.

== Career ==
Robinson was first elected to Limavady Borough Council in 2005 as a representative for the Limavady Town District, alongside his father, George Robinson.

He was re-elected to the District in 2011, and later elected onto the newly created Causeway Coast and Glens Borough Council in the 2014 local elections, representing Limavady. Robinson was re-elected to the Council in 2019

Robinson succeeded his father as an MLA for East Londonderry in the Northern Ireland Assembly at the 2022 Assembly election. He was announced as the DUP assembly spokesperson for senior citizens in 2023.
