= 2011 Coleraine Borough Council election =

Local government election in Northern Ireland

| ← 2005 | 5 May 2011 | 2014 → |

All 22 seats to Coleraine Borough Council 12 seats needed for a majority
| | First party | Second party | Third party |
|---|---|---|---|
| Party | DUP | UUP | SDLP |
| Seats won | 9 | 5 | 3 |
| Seat change | 0 | ▼3 | 0 |
| | Fourth party | Fifth party | Sixth party |
| Party | Alliance | Independent | Sinn Féin |
| Seats won | 2 | 2 | 1 |
| Seat change | ▲2 | ▲1 | 0 |
- Party with the most votes by district.

Elections to Coleraine Borough Council were held on 5 May 2011 on the same day as the other Northern Irish local government elections. The election used four district electoral areas to elect a total of 22 councillors.

== Election results ==
Coleraine Borough Council Election Result 2011
| Party | Seats | Gains | Losses | Net gain/loss | Seats % | Votes % | Votes | +/− |
|---|---|---|---|---|---|---|---|---|
| DUP | 9 | 1 | 1 | 0 | 40.9 | 35.6 | 6,984 | ▼1.3 |
| UUP | 5 | 0 | 3 | ▼3 | 22.7 | 20.6 | 4,047 | ▼11.4 |
| SDLP | 3 | 0 | 0 | 0 | 13.6 | 10.5 | 2,066 | ▼1.8 |
| Independent | 2 | 1 | 0 | ▲1 | 9.1 | 13.5 | 2,642 | ▲7.2 |
| Alliance | 2 | 2 | 0 | ▲2 | 9.1 | 8.8 | 1,723 | ▲4.1 |
| Sinn Féin | 1 | 0 | 0 | 0 | 4.5 | 9.0 | 1,759 | ▲1.1 |
| TUV | 0 | 0 | 0 | 0 | 0.0 | 1.7 | 324 | New |
| UKIP | 0 | 0 | 0 | 0 | 0.0 | 0.5 | 91 | New |

Note: "Votes" are the first preference votes.

== Districts summary ==
Results of the Coleraine Borough Council election, 2011 by district
| Ward | % | Cllrs | % | Cllrs | % | Cllrs | % | Cllrs | % | Cllrs | % | Cllrs | Total Cllrs |
| Ward | DUP | | UUP | | SDLP | | Alliance | | Sinn Féin | | Others | | Total Cllrs |
|---|---|---|---|---|---|---|---|---|---|---|---|---|---|
| Bann | 35.0 | 2 | 25.5 | 2 | 15.3 | 1 | 4.1 | 0 | 16.5 | 1 | 3.6 | 0 | 6 |
| Coleraine Central | 31.9 | 3 | 16.0 | 1 | 8.6 | 1 | 7.2 | 0 | 8.3 | 0 | 28.0 | 1 | 6 |
| Coleraine East | 59.9 | 3 | 23.1 | 1 | 6.8 | 0 | 10.2 | 1 | 0.0 | 0 | 0.0 | 0 | 5 |
| The Skerries | 20.8 | 1 | 17.1 | 1 | 8.6 | 1 | 16.0 | 1 | 6.9 | 0 | 30.6 | 1 | 5 |
| Total | 35.6 | 9 | 20.6 | 5 | 10.5 | 3 | 8.8 | 2 | 9.0 | 1 | 15.5 | 2 | 22 |

== District results ==
=== Bann ===
2005: 2 x DUP, 2 x UUP, 1 x Sinn Féin, 1 x SDLP
2011: 2 x DUP, 2 x UUP, 1 x Sinn Féin, 1 x SDLP
2005-2011 Change: No change

Bann - 6 seats
| Party | Candidate | FPv% | Count | | | | | | | |
| Party | Candidate | FPv% | 1 | 2 | 3 | 4 | 5 | 6 | 7 | 8 |
|---|---|---|---|---|---|---|---|---|---|---|
| DUP | Adrian McQuillan* | 22.04% | 1,440 | | | | | | | |
| Sinn Féin | Ciaran Archibald | 16.47% | 1,076 | | | | | | | |
| UUP | William King* | 14.35% | 938 | | | | | | | |
| DUP | Sam Cole* | 9.53% | 623 | 860.96 | 861.68 | 940.68 | | | | |
| SDLP | Roisin Loftus | 8.91% | 582 | 583.44 | 656.7 | 658.7 | 701.42 | 701.42 | 711.86 | 1,070.86 |
| UUP | Richard Holmes | 5.55% | 363 | 379.2 | 379.38 | 440.26 | 480.62 | 481.72 | 838.48 | 846.38 |
| DUP | Angela Torrens | 3.41% | 223 | 429.64 | 429.82 | 465.78 | 491.78 | 496.08 | 542 | 554.98 |
| SDLP | Eamon Mullan | 6.41% | 419 | 421.16 | 483.26 | 484.26 | 525.06 | 525.26 | 526.26 | |
| UUP | Rosemary Torrens | 5.60% | 366 | 395.52 | 395.52 | 434.24 | 470.6 | 471.4 | | |
| Alliance | Charlie McConaghy | 4.07% | 266 | 267.44 | 271.04 | 272.4 | | | | |
| TUV | Elizabeth Collins | 3.66% | 239 | 248 | 248.18 | | | | | |
Electorate: 10,978 Valid: 6,535 (59.53%) Spoilt: 110 Quota: 934 Turnout: 6,645 (60.53%)

=== Coleraine Central ===
2005: 3 x UUP, 2 x DUP, 1 x SDLP
2011: 3 x DUP, 1 x UUP, 1 x SDLP, 1 x Independent
2005-2011 Change: DUP gain from UUP, Independent leaves UUP

Coleraine Central - 6 seats
| Party | Candidate | FPv% | Count | | | | | | | |
| Party | Candidate | FPv% | 1 | 2 | 3 | 4 | 5 | 6 | 7 | 8 |
|---|---|---|---|---|---|---|---|---|---|---|
| Independent | David McClarty* | 22.09% | 1,260 | | | | | | | |
| DUP | George Duddy | 12.53% | 715 | 746.16 | 746.16 | 836.16 | | | | |
| SDLP | Gerry McLaughlin* | 7.08% | 404 | 437.06 | 502.82 | 506.96 | 506.96 | 815.38 | | |
| UUP | David Barbour* | 9.76% | 557 | 650.48 | 652.48 | 699.46 | 702.22 | 704.22 | 939.22 | |
| DUP | James McClure* | 10.20% | 582 | 646.98 | 646.98 | 734.3 | 735.68 | 738.68 | 783.21 | 815.03 |
| DUP | William McCandless | 9.20% | 525 | 570.6 | 570.6 | 643.88 | 657.68 | 661.06 | 712.38 | 774.54 |
| Alliance | Graham Scobie | 8.27% | 472 | 545.72 | 551.72 | 560.62 | 560.85 | 586.85 | 621.35 | 649.47 |
| UUP | Nigel MacAuley | 6.19% | 353 | 411.52 | 412.9 | 438.32 | 439.93 | 444.69 | | |
| Sinn Féin | Susan Kelly | 7.15% | 408 | 412.94 | 419.32 | 419.32 | 419.32 | | | |
| Independent | Russell Watton | 5.99% | 342 | 368.98 | 368.98 | | | | | |
| SDLP | Sebastian Pierzchalski | 1.52% | 87 | 89.66 | | | | | | |
Electorate: 11,313 Valid: 5,705 (50.43%) Spoilt: 108 Quota: 816 Turnout: 5,813 (51.38%)

=== Coleraine East ===
2005: 3 x DUP, 2 x UUP
2011: 3 x DUP, 1 x UUP, 1 x Alliance
2005-2011 Change: Alliance gain from UUP

Coleraine East - 5 seats
| Party | Candidate | FPv% | Count | | | | |
| Party | Candidate | FPv% | 1 | 2 | 3 | 4 | 5 |
|---|---|---|---|---|---|---|---|
| DUP | Maurice Bradley* | 44.01% | 1,507 | | | | |
| DUP | William Creelman* | 10.98% | 376 | 1,120.25 | | | |
| DUP | Phyllis Fielding* | 4.88% | 167 | 251.5 | 768.46 | | |
| UUP | David Harding | 15.10% | 517 | 568.35 | 579.39 | | |
| Alliance | Yvonne Boyle | 10.22% | 350 | 261.7 | 362.66 | 370.86 | 539.06 |
| UUP | Robert McPherson* | 8.03% | 275 | 308.8 | 318.88 | 505.43 | 518.9 |
| SDLP | Teresa Young | 6.78% | 232 | 241.1 | 243.02 | 245.48 | |
Electorate: 7,678 Valid: 3,424 (44.59%) Spoilt: 95 Quota: 571 Turnout: 3,519 (45.83%)

=== The Skerries ===
2005: 2 x DUP, 1 x UUP, 1 x SDLP, 1 x Independent
2011: 1 x DUP, 1 x UUP, 1 x Alliance, 1 x SDLP, 1 x Independent
2005-2011 Change: Alliance gain from DUP

The Skerries - 5 seats
| Party | Candidate | FPv% | Count | | | | | | | |
| Party | Candidate | FPv% | 1 | 2 | 3 | 4 | 5 | 6 | 7 | 8 |
|---|---|---|---|---|---|---|---|---|---|---|
| Alliance | Barney Fitzpatrick | 15.99% | 635 | 636 | 649 | 676 | | | | |
| Independent | Christine Alexander* | 14.85% | 590 | 594 | 651 | 670 | | | | |
| DUP | Mark Fielding | 14.15% | 562 | 572 | 593 | 594 | 594.61 | 618.61 | 823.61 | |
| UUP | Norman Hillis* | 10.45% | 415 | 424 | 447 | 448 | 448 | 624 | 688 | |
| SDLP | Maura Hickey* | 8.61% | 342 | 342 | 348 | 534 | 544.98 | 552.98 | 560.98 | 571.98 |
| Independent | Noel Kennedy | 8.41% | 334 | 352 | 391 | 398 | 399.22 | 423.22 | 431.22 | 466.22 |
| DUP | Sandy Gilkinson* | 6.65% | 264 | 281 | 299 | 299 | 299 | 324 | | |
| UUP | Lesley MacAuley | 6.62% | 263 | 267 | 291 | 291 | 291 | | | |
| Sinn Féin | Christopher O'Neill | 6.92% | 275 | 275 | 280 | | | | | |
| Independent | James Davies | 2.92% | 116 | 117 | | | | | | |
| UKIP | Adrian Parke | 2.29% | 91 | 105 | | | | | | |
| TUV | Michael Wiggins | 2.14% | 85 | | | | | | | |
Electorate: 8,167 Valid: 3,972 (48.63%) Spoilt: 62 Quota: 663 Turnout: 4,034 (49.39%)
