= 2023 Causeway Coast and Glens Borough Council election =

Northern Ireland local election

- 18 May 2023

All 40 council seats 21 seats needed for a majority
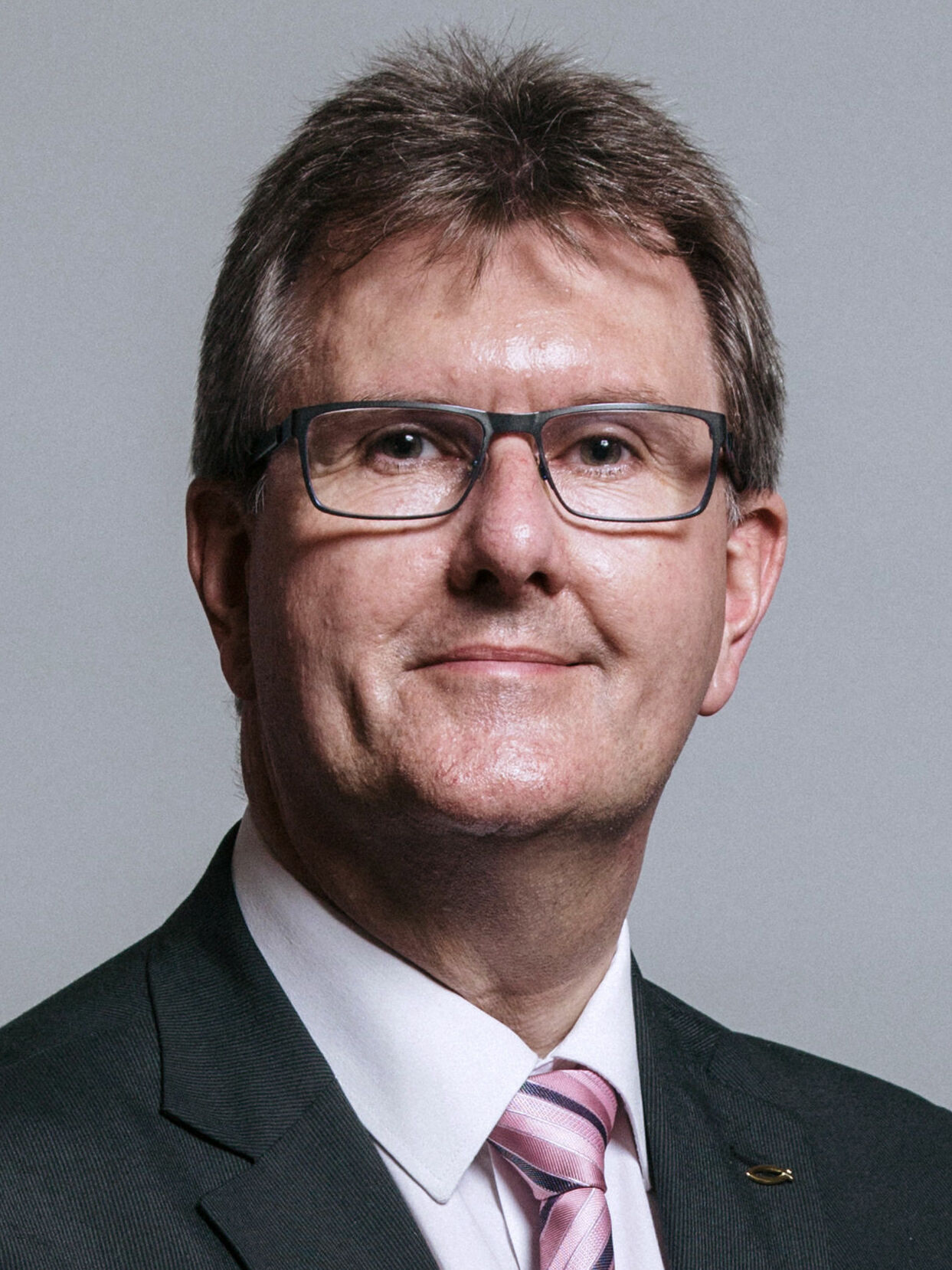

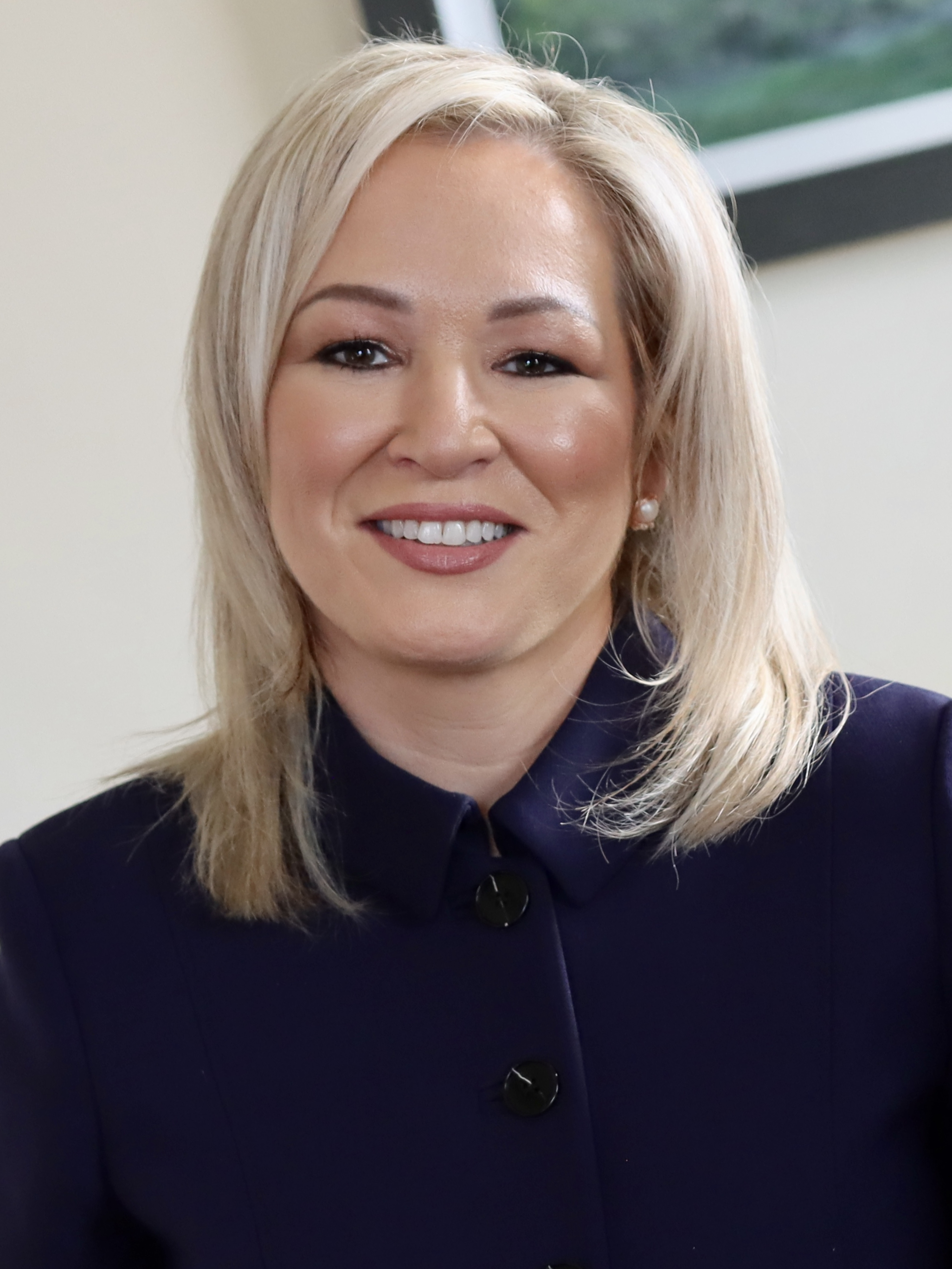

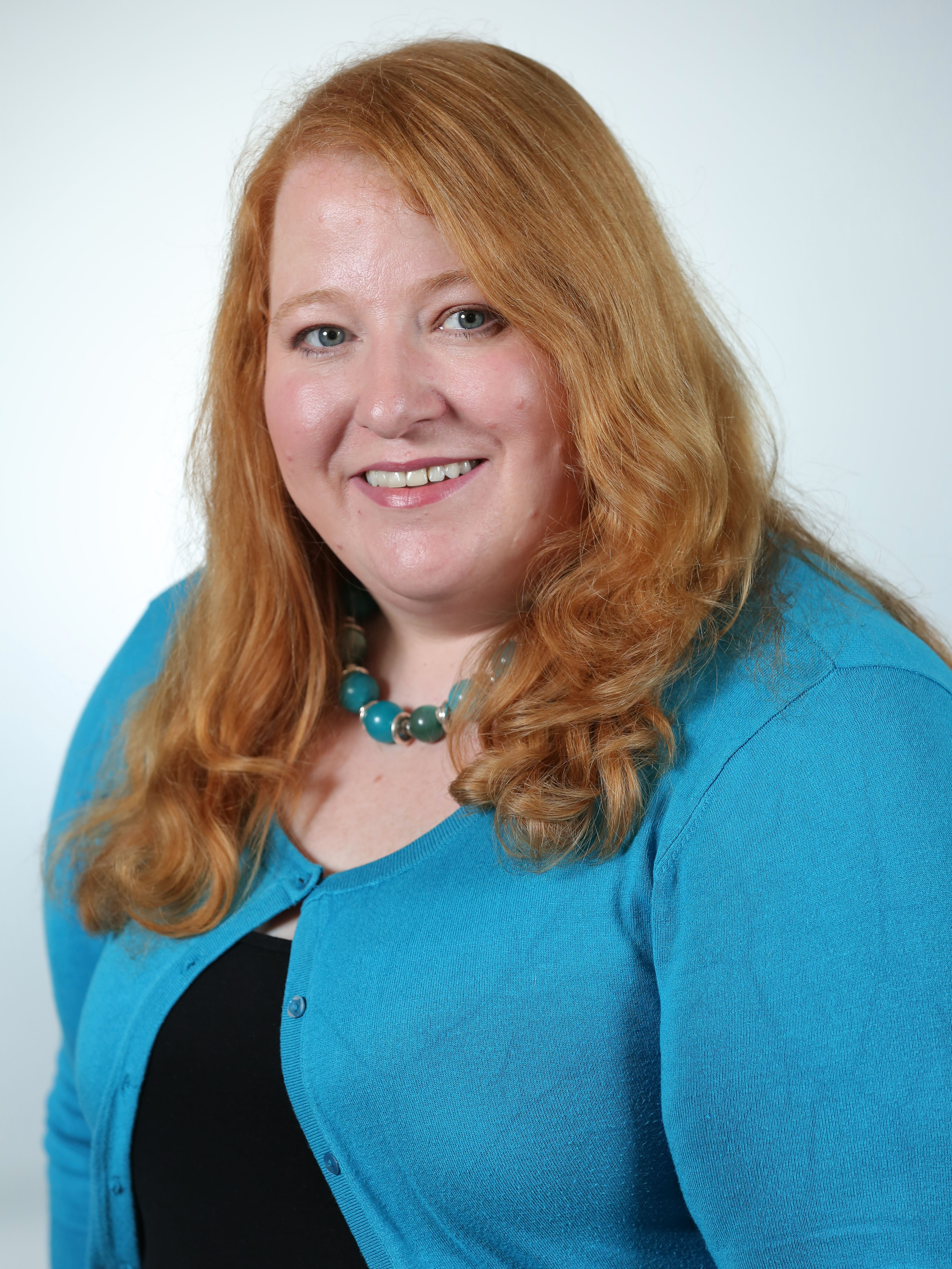

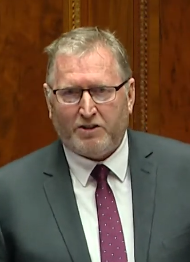

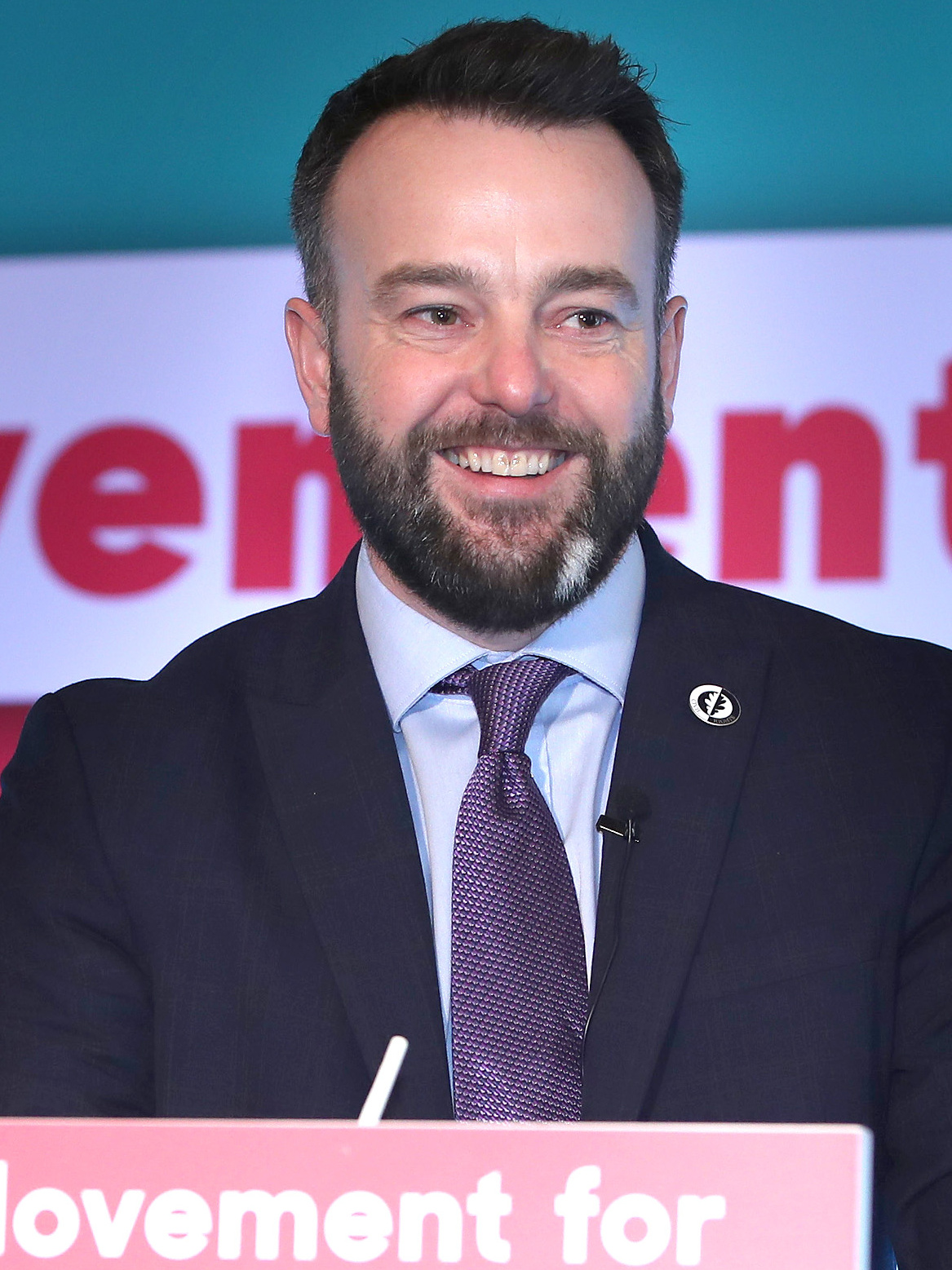

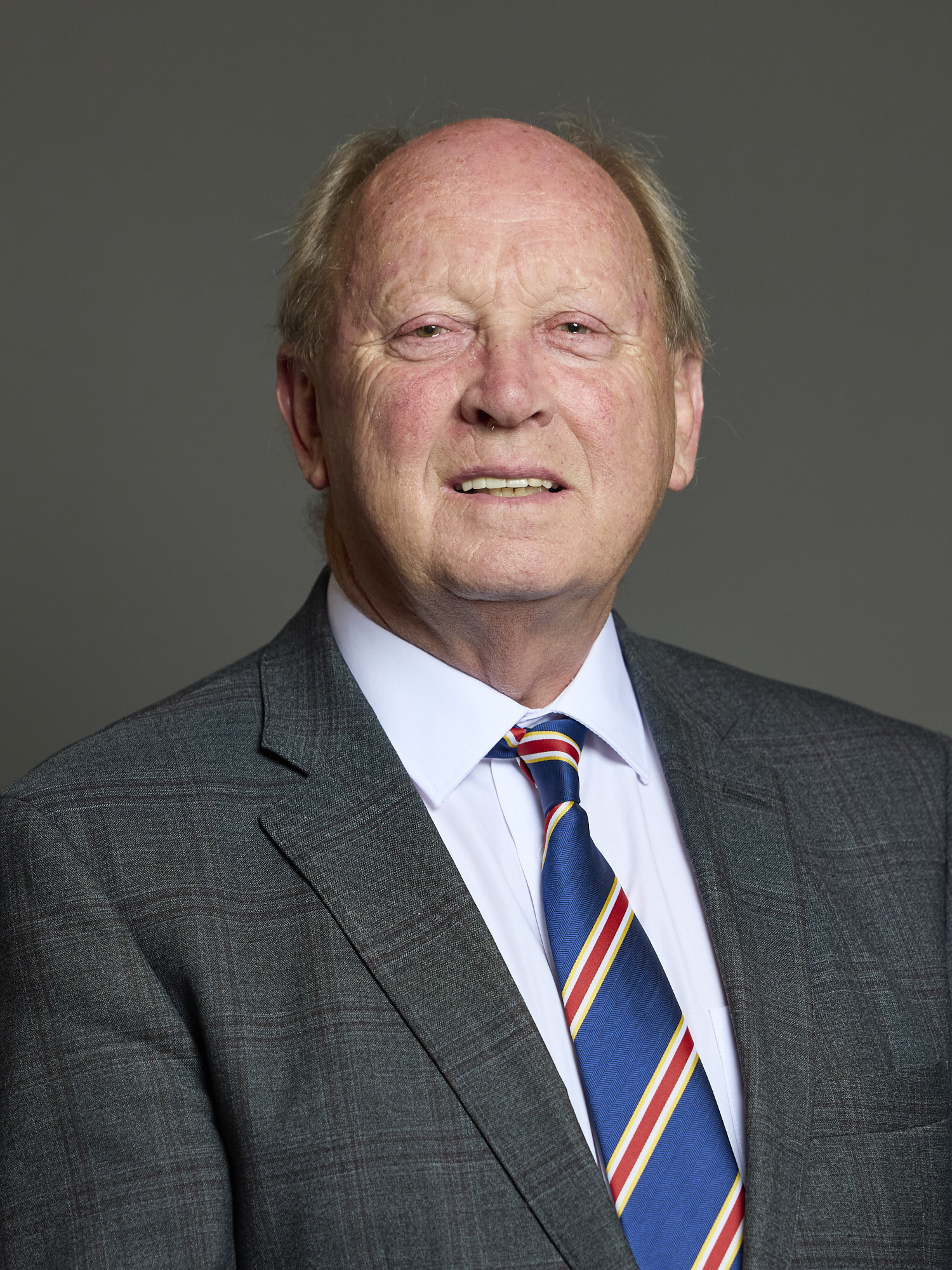
	First party	Second party	Third party
Leader	Jeffrey Donaldson	Michelle O'Neill (Note: The leader of Sinn Féin is Mary Lou McDonald, who sits as a TD in the Irish Dáil Éireann for Dublin Central. O'Neill is the leader of the party in Northern Ireland.)	Naomi Long
Party	DUP	Sinn Féin	Alliance
Last election	14	9	2
Seats won	13	12	5
Seat change	▼1	▲3	▲3
Popular vote	15,041	17,161	5,425
Percentage	27.0%	30.8%	9.7%
Swing	▼3.3%	▲8.7%	▲1.7%
	Fourth party	Fifth party	Sixth party
Leader	Doug Beattie	Colum Eastwood	Jim Allister
Party	UUP	SDLP	TUV
Last election	7	6	0
Seats won	4	3	2
Seat change	▼3	▼3	▲2
Popular vote	7,055	2,774	2,657
Percentage	12.7%	5.0%	4.8%
Swing	▼2.6%	▼4.3%	▲0.5%
	Seventh party
Leader	Billy Hutchinson
Party	PUP
Last election	1
Seats won	1
Seat change	0
Popular vote	1,016
Percentage	1.8%
Swing	▼1.3%
- Causeway Coast and Glens 2023 Council Election Results by DEA (Shaded by plurality of FPVs) Sinn Féin: 12 seats SDLP: 3 seats Alliance Party of Northern Ireland: 5 seats Progressive Unionist Party: 1 seat Ulster Unionist Party: 4 seats Democratic Unionist Party: 13 seats Traditional Unionist Voice: 2 seats
Council control before election
No overall control
Council control after election
No overall control

The 2023 election to Causeway Coast and Glens Borough Council was scheduled and held on 18 May 2023, alongside other local elections in Northern Ireland, two weeks after local elections in England. The Northern Ireland elections were delayed by 2 weeks to avoid overlapping with the coronation of King Charles III.

It returned 40 members to the council via Single Transferable Vote.

== Election results ==
Causeway Coast and Glens District Council Election Result 2023
Party	Seats	Gains	Losses	Net gain/loss	Seats %	Votes %	Votes	+/−
DUP	13	1	2	▼1	32.50	27.02	15,041	▼3.33
Sinn Féin	12	3	0	▲3	30.00	30.82	17,161	▲8.66
Alliance	5	3	0	▲3	12.50	9.74	5,425	▲1.73
UUP	4	0	3	▼3	10.00	12.67	7,055	▼2.59
SDLP	3	0	3	▼3	7.50	4.98	2,774	▼4.27
TUV	2	2	0	▲2	5.00	4.77	2,657	▲0.47
PUP	1	0	0	0	2.50	1.82	1,016	▼1.29
Independent	0	0	1	▼1	0.00	4.84	2,696	▲0.81
Aontú	0	0	0	0	0.00	2.24	1,248	▲0.28
Green (NI)	0	0	0	0	0.00	0.64	354	▼0.01
People Before Profit	0	0	0	0	0.00	0.44	247	New
Total	40						55,674	

Note: "Votes" are the first preference votes.

== Districts summary ==
Results of the 2023 Causeway Coast and Glens Borough Council election by district
District Electoral Area (DEA)	%	Cllrs	%	Cllrs	%	Cllrs	%	Cllrs	%	Cllrs	%	Cllrs	%	Cllrs	%	Cllrs	Total cllrs
District Electoral Area (DEA)	DUP		Sinn Féin		Alliance		UUP		SDLP		TUV		PUP		Independents and others		Total cllrs
Ballymoney	34.58	2 ▼1	25.21	2	8.83	1 ▲1	16.98	1 ▼1	2.87	0	9.98	1 ▲1	0.00	0	1.55	0	7
Bann	24.06	2	27.02	2 ▲1	7.24	0	19.48	1	2.19	0 ▼1	5.76	0	0.00	0	14.25	0	5
Benbradagh	15.68	1	58.80	3	4.49	0	7.64	0	5.62	1	0.00	0	0.00	0	7.77	0	5
Causeway	34.53	3	8.11	0	15.80	2 ▲1	15.90	1 ▼1	5.11	0 ▼1	9.84	1 ▲1	0.00	0	10.70	0	7
Coleraine	33.62	2	11.61	1 ▲1	12.81	1	9.75	1	4.45	0 ▼1	4.59	0	13.74	1	9.43	0	6
Limavady	32.90	2 ▼1	29.85	1	9.07	1 ▲1	8.47	0	7.35	1	0.00	0	0.00	0	12.37	0	5
The Glens	12.27	1 ▲1	58.67	3 ▲1	9.52	0	7.62	0 ▼1	8.47	1	0.00	0	0.00	0	3.44	0 ▼1	5
Total	27.02	13 ▲1	30.82	12 ▲3	9.74	5 ▲3	12.67	4 ▼4	4.98	3 ▼3	4.77	2 ▲2	1.82	1	8.16	0 ▼1	40

== District results ==
=== Ballymoney ===
2019: 3 x DUP, 2 x Sinn Féin, 2 x UUP

2023: 2 x DUP, 2 x Sinn Féin, 1 x UUP, 1 x TUV, 1 x Alliance

2019–2023 Change: Alliance and TUV gain from DUP and UUP

Ballymoney - 7 seats
Party	Candidate	FPv%	Count						
Party	Candidate	FPv%	1	2	3	4	5	6	7
DUP	Mervyn Storey*	17.84%	1,779						
Sinn Féin	Ciarán McQuillan*	13.24%	1,320						
UUP	Darryl Wilson* ‡	12.59%	1,255						
Sinn Féin	Leanne Peacock*	11.97%	1,194	1,195.50	1,259.50				
DUP	Ivor Wallace* ‡	8.10%	808	1,123.60	1,126.60	1,248.60			
Alliance	Lee Kane	8.83%	880	881.50	903.80	1,233.20	1,300.30		
TUV	Jonathan McAuley	9.98%	995	1,025.30	1,030.30	1,134.40	1,134.70	1,139.20	1,139.20
DUP	Alan McLean*	8.64%	861	1,020.30	1,022.60	1,115.30	1,115.60	1,118.30	1,121.30
UUP	Tom McKeown*	4.39%	438	459.00	463.00				
SDLP	Caitlin Bond	2.87%	286	286.30	314.30				
Independent	Cathal McLaughlin	1.55%	155	155.60					
Electorate: 18,117 Valid: 9,971 (55.04%) Spoilt: 119 Quota: 1,247 Turnout: 10,090 (55.69%)

=== Bann ===
2019: 2 x DUP, 1 x UUP, 1 x Sinn Féin, 1 x SDLP

2023: 2 x DUP, 2 x Sinn Féin, 1 x UUP

2019–2023 Change: Sinn Féin gain from SDLP

Bann - 5 seats
Party	Candidate	FPv%	Count							
Party	Candidate	FPv%	1	2	3	4	5	6	7	8
Sinn Féin	Sean Bateson*	16.13%	1,277	1,312.00	1,450.00					
DUP	Michelle Knight-McQuillan*	13.31%	1,054	1,054.00	1,057.00	1,160.00	1,160.00	1,183.00	1,523.00	
DUP	Dawn Huggins	10.75%	851	853.00	856.00	985.00	985.00	1,009.00	1,144.00	1,283.50
Sinn Féin	Ciarán Archibald	10.89%	862	898.00	1,006.00	1,006.00	1,122.00	1,258.00	1,272.00	1,272.62
UUP	Richard Holmes*	9.88%	782	788.00	793.00	889.00	889.00	1,009.00	1,200.00	1,238.44
UUP	Andrew Kerr	9.60%	760	768.00	770.00	815.00	815.00	964.00	1,042.00	1,064.32
Independent	Adrian McQuillan*	8.85%	701	715.00	724.00	789.00	791.00	883.00		
Alliance	Joe Hutchinson	7.24%	573	693.00	746.00	755.00	766.00			
TUV	William Craig	5.76%	456	461.00	463.00					
Aontú	Gemma Brolly	4.24%	336	364.00						
SDLP	Ryan Barkley	2.19%	173							
Green (NI)	Jen McCahon	1.16%	92							
Electorate: 13,347 Valid: 7,917 (59.32%) Spoilt: 70 Quota: 1,320 Turnout: 7,987 (59.84%)

=== Benbradagh ===
2019: 3 x Sinn Féin, 1 x SDLP, 1 x DUP

2023: 3 x Sinn Féin, 1 x DUP, 1 x SDLP

2019–2023 Change: No change

Benbradagh - 5 seats
Party	Candidate	FPv%	Count						
Party	Candidate	FPv%	1	2	3	4	5	6	7
Sinn Féin	Sean McGlinchey*	24.04%	1,888						
Sinn Féin	Dermot Nicholl*	19.84%	1,558						
Sinn Féin	Kathleen McGurk*	14.92%	1,172	1,640.00					
DUP	Edgar Scott*	15.68%	1,231	1,231.00	1,231.30	1,231.57	1,256.38	1,755.38	
SDLP	Michael Coyle	5.62%	441	461.70	549.60	710.52	991.86	1,067.60	1,187.60
Aontú	Liam McElhinney	6.29%	494	546.20	645.80	690.08	805.25	812.25	825.25
UUP	Robert Carmichael	7.64%	600	600.00	601.20	601.47	659.94		
Alliance	Christine Turner	4.49%	353	360.20	389.00	420.86			
Independent	Niall Murphy	1.48%	116	131.60	169.40	180.20			
Electorate: 13,317 Valid: 7,853 (58.97%) Spoilt: 50 Quota: 1,309 Turnout: 7,903 (59.34%)

=== Causeway ===
2019: 3 x DUP, 2 x UUP, 1 x Alliance, 1 x SDLP

2023: 3 x DUP, 2 x Alliance, 1 x UUP, 1 x TUV

2019–2023 Change: Alliance and TUV gain from UUP and SDLP

Causeway - 7 seats
Party	Candidate	FPv%	Count									
Party	Candidate	FPv%	1	2	3	4	5	6	7	8	9	10
DUP	Mark Fielding*	14.81%	1,305									
Alliance	Peter McCully	10.49%	924	925.35	1,022.35	1,068.65	1,165.65					
UUP	Sandra Hunter*	9.00%	793	802.90	818.05	830.05	880.05	880.76	888.62	1,335.62		
DUP	John McAuley*	9.76%	860	992.15	995.45	1,003.60	1,032.20	1,032.91	1,034.06	1,072.91	1,142.60	
Alliance	Richard Stewart	5.31%	468	468.90	489.90	538.20	599.20	649.61	936.29	1,021.59	1,111.98	
TUV	Allister Kyle	9.84%	867	886.50	888.65	898.80	936.25	936.25	940.25	992.90	1,037.06	1,038.86
DUP	Sharon McKillop*	9.96%	878	899.00	900.15	909.45	925.60	925.60	929.60	963.20	992.18	1,030.43
Sinn Féin	Emma Thompson	8.11%	715	715.00	732.00	751.00	767.00	767.71	937.71	945.71	945.71	945.71
UUP	Barry Torrens	6.90%	608	613.70	625.70	663.85	738.60	739.61	766.31			
SDLP	Paul Shevlin	5.11%	450	450.30	491.30	530.30	562.30	572.24				
Independent	David Alexander	4.02%	354	355.80	375.80	476.95						
Independent	Angela Mulholland*	3.71%	327	328.50	353.65							
Green (NI)	Mark Coulson	2.97%	262	263.05								
Electorate: 17,620 Valid: 8,811 (50.01%) Spoilt: 97 Quota: 1,102 Turnout: 8,908 (50.55%)

=== Coleraine ===
2019: 2 x DUP, 1 x PUP, 1 x SDLP, 1 x UUP, 1 x Alliance

2023: 2 x DUP, 1 x PUP, 1 x Alliance, 1 x Sinn Féin, 1 x UUP

2019–2023 Change: Sinn Féin gain from SDLP

Coleraine - 6 seats
Party	Candidate	FPv%	Count									
Party	Candidate	FPv%	1	2	3	4	5	6	7	8	9	10
DUP	Philip Anderson*	18.79%	1,389									
PUP	Russell Watton*	13.74%	1,016	1,055.12	1,066.12							
Alliance	Yvonne Boyle*	12.81%	947	952.04	1,041.04	1,049.04	1,220.04					
Sinn Féin	Niamh Archibald	11.61%	858	858.72	892.96	894.96	1,023.96	1,035.68	1,117.68			
UUP	John Wisener	9.75%	721	730.84	739.84	799.00	815.00	1,019.32	1,046.32	1,067.32		
DUP	Tanya Stirling	5.97%	441	623.40	629.64	747.40	757.64	907.80	908.80	910.80	913.80	913.80
DUP	Adele Tomb	8.86%	655	714.04	721.04	805.40	809.64	901.08	901.08	904.08	907.08	910.08
Independent	George Duddy*	6.09%	450	470.40	487.64	553.08	566.32					
SDLP	Helen Maher	4.45%	329	330.20	380.20	383.20						
TUV	Michael Sweeney	4.59%	339	351.72	358.44							
People Before Profit	Amy Merron	3.34%	247	248.44								
Electorate: 16,874 Valid: 7,392 (43.81%) Spoilt: 97 Quota: 1,057 Turnout: 7,489 (44.38%)

=== Limavady ===
2019: 3 x DUP, 1 x Sinn Féin, 1 x SDLP

2023: 2 x DUP, 1 x Sinn Féin, 1 x Alliance, 1 x SDLP

2019–2023 Change: Alliance gain from DUP

Limavady - 5 seats
Party	Candidate	FPv%	Count						
Party	Candidate	FPv%	1	2	3	4	5	6	7
Sinn Féin	Brenda Chivers*	29.85%	1,800						
DUP	Steven Callaghan*	16.75%	1,010						
SDLP	Ashleen Schenning*	7.35%	443	974.84	1,049.84				
DUP	Aaron Callan*	8.22%	496	496.48	505.48	506.48	906.96	1,068.96	
Alliance	Amy Mairs	9.07%	547	674.20	754.56	789.56	794.56	914.40	931.65
Independent	James McCorkell*	9.32%	562	567.28	594.56	597.56	649.56	850.56	895.41
UUP	Barry Crawford	8.47%	511	513.40	522.76	523.76	541.76		
DUP	Jordan Wallace	7.93%	478	479.92	485.92	485.92			
Aontú	John Boyle	2.54%	153	269.64					
Independent	Billy Stewart	0.51%	31	32.92					
Electorate: 11,615 Valid: 6,031 (51.92%) Spoilt: 50 Quota: 1,006 Turnout: 6,081 (52.35%)

=== The Glens ===
2019: 2 x Sinn Féin, 1 x SDLP, 1 x UUP, 1 x Independent

2023: 3 x Sinn Féin, 1 x SDLP, 1 x DUP

2019–2023 Change: Sinn Féin and DUP gain from UUP and Independent

The Glens - 5 seats
Party	Candidate	FPv%	Count					
Party	Candidate	FPv%	1	2	3	4	5	6
Sinn Féin	Cara McShane*	24.85%	1,913					
Sinn Féin	Oliver McMullan*	18.99%	1,462					
Sinn Féin	Mairghéad Watson	14.83%	1,142	1,578.92				
DUP	Bill Kennedy	12.27%	945	947.31	949.29	953.62	1,384.62	
SDLP	Margaret Anne McKillop* ‡	8.47%	652	755.29	922.93	1,102.92	1,135.58	1,273.90
Alliance	Glenise Morgan	9.52%	733	789.10	848.17	898.05	982.03	1,016.99
UUP	Wesley Craig	7.62%	587	590.30	590.63	597.96		
Aontú	John Robbin	3.44%	265	285.46	335.62			
Electorate: 13,178 Valid: 7,699 (58.42%) Spoilt: 100 Quota: 1,284 Turnout: 7,799 (59.18%)

== Changes during the term ==
=== ‡ Changes in affiliation ===
Date	Electoral Area	Name	Previous affiliation	New affiliation	Circumstance
10 May 2024	Ballymoney	Ivor Wallace	DUP	Independent	Left the DUP after being disappointed with the recent direction of the party.
31 December 2024	Ballymoney	Darryl Wilson	UUP	Independent	Left the UUP following "much reflection, particularly after a challenging yet enlightening year in 2024.
20 January 2025	Ballymoney	Darryl Wilson	Independent	DUP	Joined the DUP.
16 October 2025	The Glens	Margaret Anne McKillop	SDLP	Independent	Left the SDLP in opposition to its stance on abortion.
12 September 2026	The Glens	Margaret Anne McKillop	Independent	Aontú	Joined Aontú.
