= 2019 Causeway Coast and Glens Borough Council election =

Local government election in Northern Ireland

2019 Causeway Coast and Glens Council election
- 2 May 2019

All 40 council seats 21 seats needed for a majority
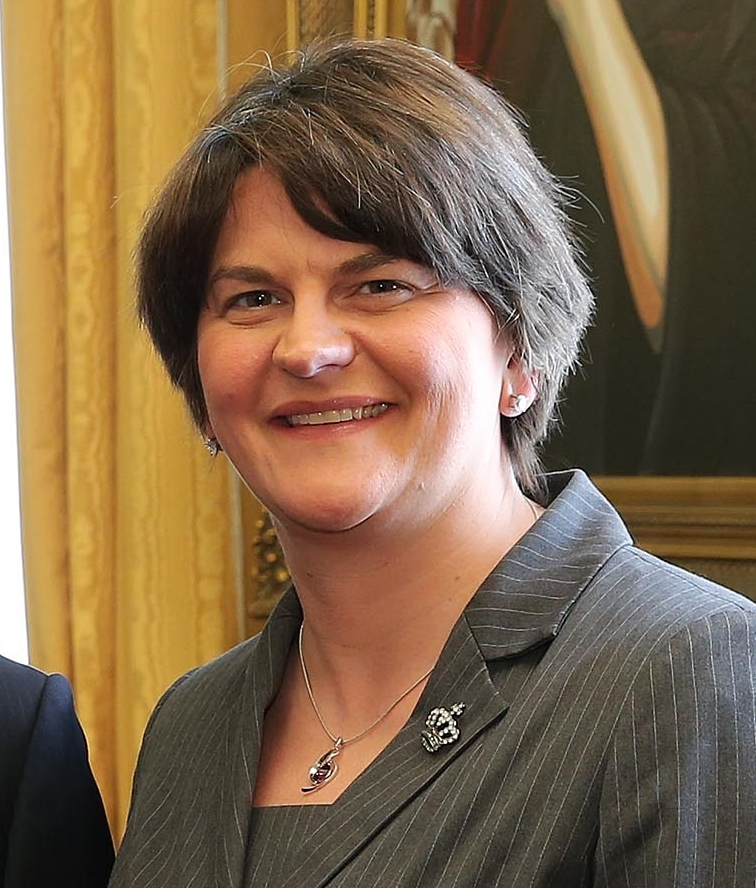

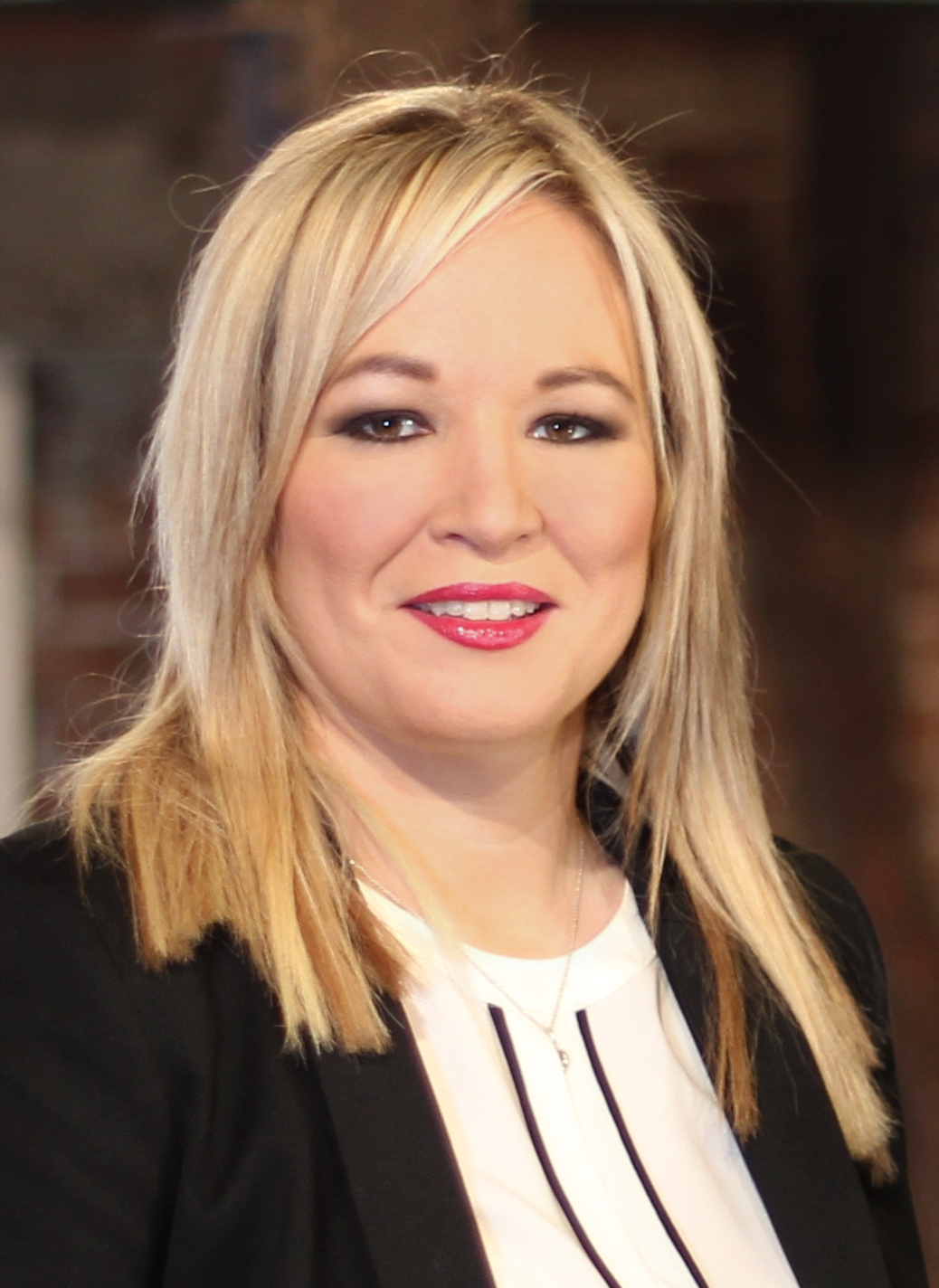

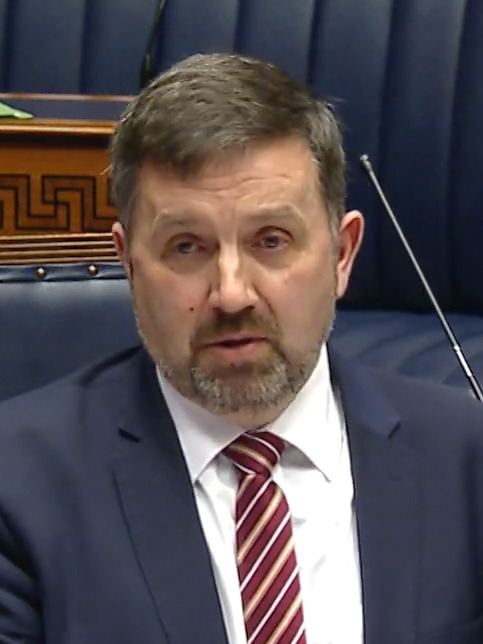

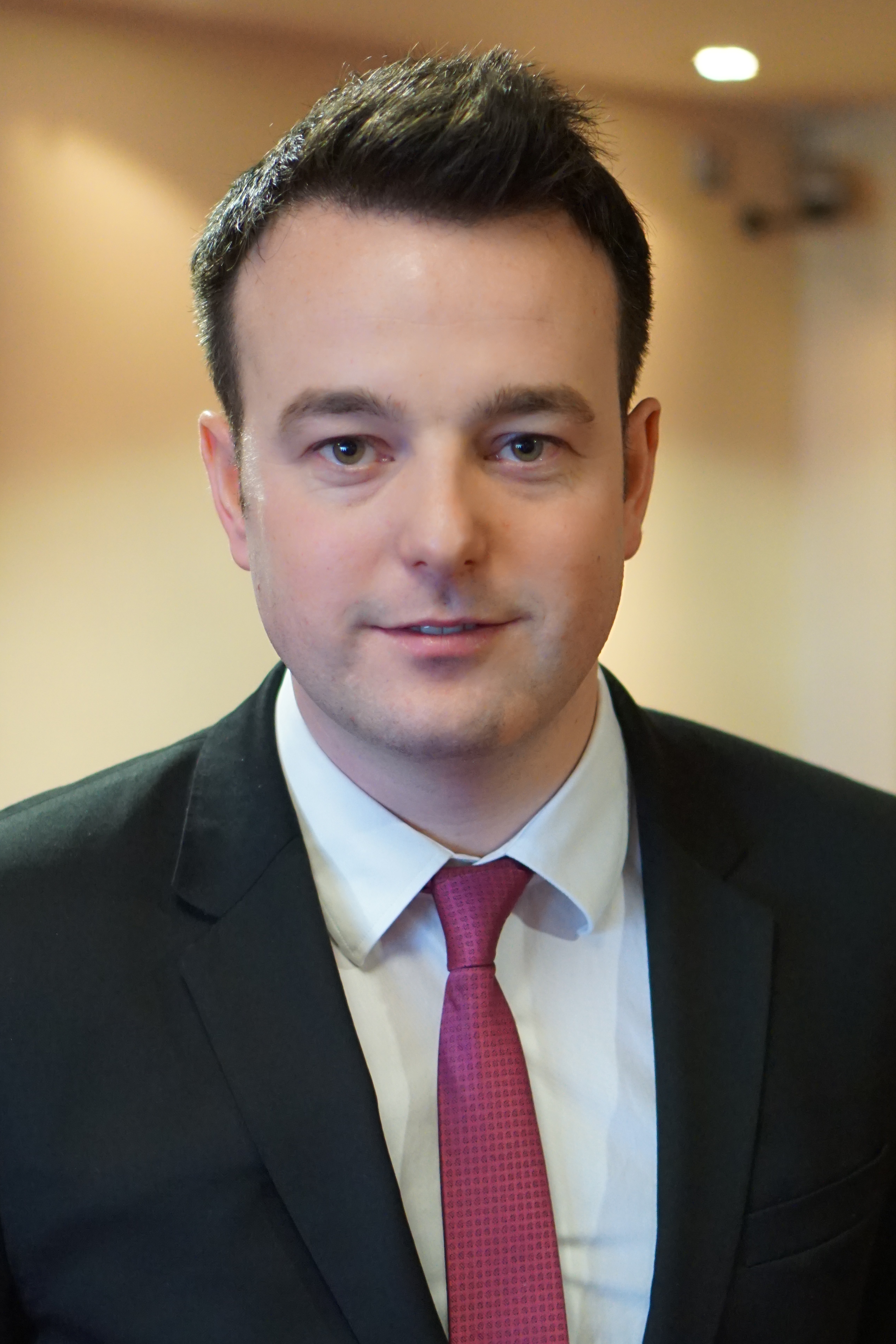

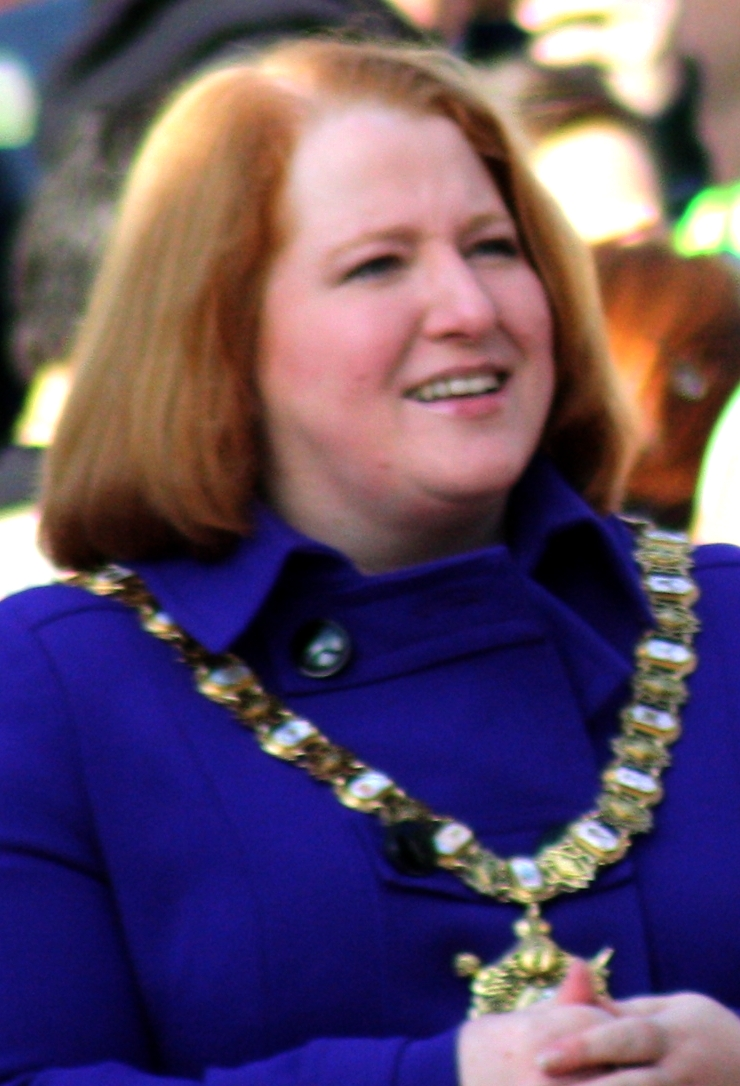

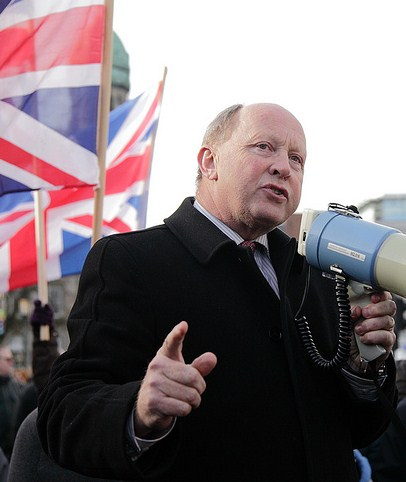

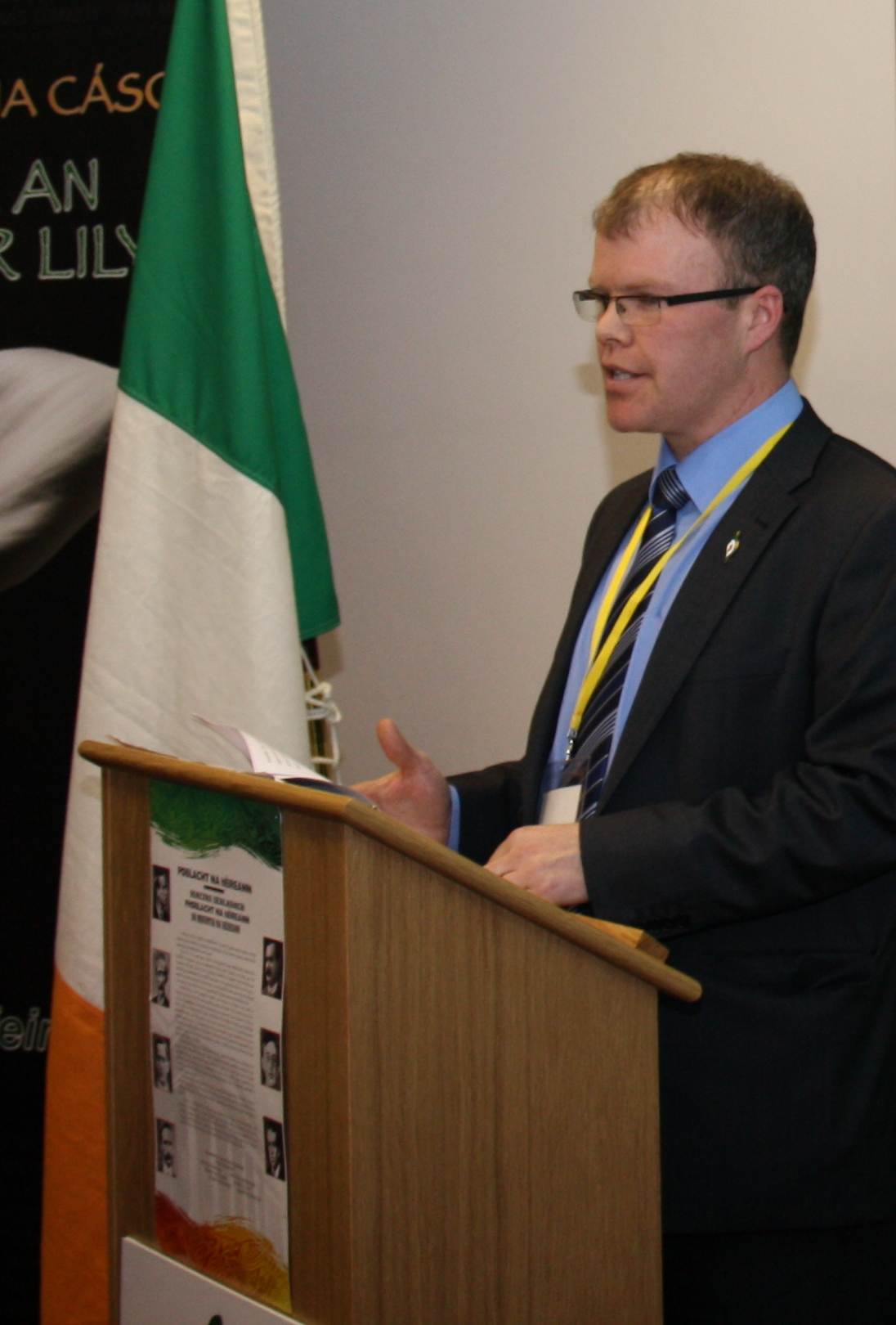
	First party	Second party	Third party
Leader	Arlene Foster	Michelle O'Neill (Note: The leader of Sinn Féin is Mary Lou McDonald, who sits as a TD in the Irish Dáil Éireann for Dublin Central. O'Neill is the leader of the party in Northern Ireland.)	Robin Swann
Party	DUP	Sinn Féin	UUP
Seats won	14	9	7
Seat change	▲3	▲2	▼3
	Fourth party	Fifth party	Sixth party
Leader	Colum Eastwood	Naomi Long	Billy Hutchinson
Party	SDLP	Alliance	PUP
Seats won	6	2	1
Seat change	0	▲1	0
	Seventh party	Eighth party	Ninth party
Leader		Jim Allister	Peadar Tóibín
Party	Independent	TUV	Aontú
Seats won	1	0	0
Seat change	0	▼3	0
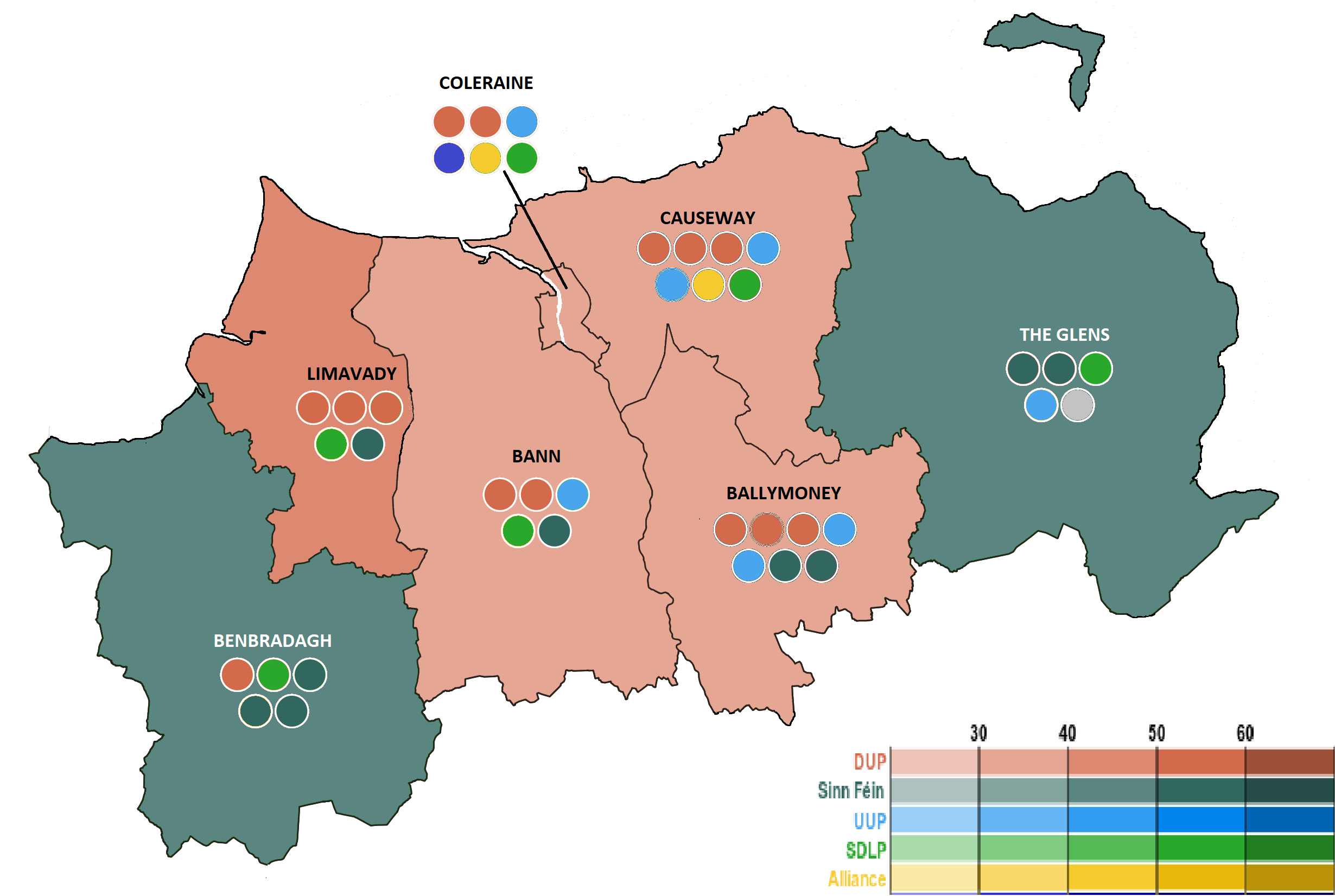
- Causeway Coast and Glens 2019 Council Election Results by DEA (Shaded by plurality of FPVs)

The second election to Causeway Coast and Glens Borough Council, part of the Northern Ireland local elections on 2 May 2019, returned 40 members to the council via Single Transferable Vote. The Democratic Unionist Party won a plurality of first-preference votes and seats.

== Election results ==
Causeway Coast and Glens District Council Election Result 2019
Party	Seats	Gains	Losses	Net gain/loss	Seats %	Votes %	Votes	+/−
DUP	14	3	0	▲3	35.0	30.4	15,371	▲3.4
Sinn Féin	9	2	0	▲2	22.5	22.2	11,221	▲2.3
UUP	7	0	3	▼3	17.5	15.3	7,725	▼1.8
SDLP	6	0	0	0	15.0	9.3	4,686	▼3.4
Alliance	2	1	0	▲1	5.0	8.0	4,058	▲4.1
Independent	1	0	0	0	2.5	4.0	2,039	▼1.2
PUP	1	0	0	0	2.5	3.1	1,576	▲1.4
TUV	0	0	3	▼3	0.0	4.3	2,177	▼6.1
Aontú	0	0	0	0	0.0	2.0	992	New
UKIP	0	0	0	0	0.0	0.7	350	▼0.4
Green (NI)	0	0	0	0	0.0	0.7	331	▲0.7
NI Conservatives	0	0	0	0	0.0	0.2	112	▼0.1

Note: "Votes" are the first preference votes.

The overall turnout was 51.19% with a total of 50,638 valid votes cast. A total of 574 ballots were rejected.

== Districts summary ==
Results of the Causeway Coast and Glens Borough Council election, 2019 by district
Ward	%	Cllrs	%	Cllrs	%	Cllrs	%	Cllrs	%	Cllrs	%	Cllrs	%	Cllrs	Total Cllrs
Ward	DUP		Sinn Féin		UUP		SDLP		Alliance		PUP		Others		Total Cllrs
Ballymoney	34.0	3	23.5	2	22.1	2	0.0	0	8.4	0	0.0	0	12.0	0	7
Bann	33.9	2	19.3	1	24.2	1	9.4	1	6.7	0	3.5	0	3.0	0	5
Benbradagh	12.7	1	46.1	3	5.8	0	13.1	1	4.7	0	0.0	0	17.5	0	5
Causeway	38.3	3	3.3	0	18.8	2	6.1	1	14.9	1	0.0	0	18.6	0	7
Coleraine	35.6	2	5.8	0	13.0	1	13.8	1	10.3	1	18.6	1	2.9	0	6
Limavady	45.6	3	18.6	1	7.3	0	9.3	1	10.0	0	0.0	0	9.3	0	5
The Glens	12.5	0	41.4	2	11.3	1	16.0	1	0.0	0	0.0	0	18.8	1	5
Total	30.4	14	22.2	9	15.3	7	9.3	6	8.0	2	3.1	1	11.7	1	40

== District results ==
=== Ballymoney ===
2014: 3 x DUP, 2 x UUP, 1 x Sinn Féin, 1 x TUV
2019: 3 x DUP, 2 x UUP, 2 x Sinn Féin
2014-2019 Change: Sinn Féin gain from TUV

Ballymoney - 7 seats
Party	Candidate	FPv%	Count						
Party	Candidate	FPv%	1	2	3	4	5	6	7
UUP	Darryl Wilson*	16.23%	1,420						
DUP	John Finlay* †	15.11%	1,322						
Sinn Féin	Leanne Peacock	13.18%	1,153						
UUP	Tom McKeown*	5.85%	512	702.67	716.1	735.27	802.23	802.38	1,143.38
DUP	Alan McLean*	9.45%	827	859.89	955.26	968.03	1,020.17	1,020.17	1,131.17
DUP	Ivor Wallace	9.44%	826	860.04	944.87	952.78	1,024.6	1,024.6	1,094
Sinn Féin	Cathal McLaughlin* †	10.35%	906	907.61	908.12	913.29	918.75	973.7	975.7
Alliance	Peter McCully	8.34%	734	744.81	745.49	762.95	798.04	799.59	827.49
TUV	William Blair*	5.68%	497	523.91	539.21	568.59	794.7	794.75	
Independent	Ian Stevenson*	2.51%	220	226.9	229.79	239.79			
TUV	John Wilson	2.48%	217	228.5	233.6	243.94			
UKIP	David Hanna	1.34%	117	121.83	125.57				
Electorate: 17,213 Valid: 8,751 (50.83%) Spoilt: 134 Quota: 1,094 Turnout: 8,885 (51.61%)

=== Bann ===
2014: 2 x DUP, 2 x UUP, 1 x SDLP
2019: 2 x DUP, 1 x UUP, 1 x SDLP, 1 x Sinn Féin
2014-2019 Change: Sinn Féin gain from UUP

Bann - 5 seats
Party	Candidate	FPv%	Count				
Party	Candidate	FPv%	1	2	3	4	5
Sinn Féin	Sean Bateson	19.29%	1,403				
DUP	Adrian McQuillan ‡	14.40%	1,047	1,048.12	1,173.12	1,180.28	1,307.28
UUP	Richard Holmes*	13.26%	964	964.8	1055.8	1,121.6	1,248.6
DUP	Michelle Knight-McQuillan*	10.74%	781	781.48	862.48	870.48	1,241.48
SDLP	Helena Dallat O'Driscoll	9.43%	686	846.16	853.16	1,138.44	1,144.6
UUP	William King*	10.99%	799	799	848	922	986
DUP	Sam Cole*	8.79%	639	639.48	714.48	721.64	
Alliance	Charlie McConaghy	6.75%	491	511.64	522.64		
PUP	Timmy Reid	3.45%	251	251			
TUV	Elizabeth Collins	2.94%	214	214			
Electorate: 12,656 Valid: 7,272 (57.45%) Spoilt: 78 Quota: 1,213 Turnout: 7,272 (58.07%)

=== Benbradagh ===
2014: 3 x Sinn Féin, 1 x SDLP, 1 x TUV
2019: 3 x Sinn Féin, 1 x SDLP, 1 x DUP
2014-2019 Change: DUP gain from TUV

Benbradagh - 5 seats
Party	Candidate	FPv%	Count				
Party	Candidate	FPv%	1	2	3	4	5
Sinn Féin	Seán McGlinchey*	22.33%	1,574				
SDLP	Orla Beattie*	13.08%	922	944.5	1,136.75	1,177.75	
Sinn Féin	Kathleen McGurk*	9.60%	677	974.25	986	986	1,224
Sinn Féin	Dermot Nicholl*	14.21%	1,002	1,029	1,048.25	1,048.25	1,154.25
DUP	Edgar Scott	12.71%	896	896	909	1,088	1,107
TUV	Boyd Douglas*	8.24%	581	581.25	594.25	797.25	814.5
Aontú	Proinnsias Brolly	9.29%	655	692.75	717.75	718.75	
UUP	Robert Carmichael	5.82%	410	410	438		
Alliance	Christine Turner	4.71%	332	335.5			
Electorate: 12,560 Valid: 7,049 (56.12%) Spoilt: 72 Quota: 1,175 Turnout: 7,121 (56.69%)

=== Causeway ===
2014: 2 x DUP, 2 x UUP, 1 x Alliance, 1 x SDLP, 1 x TUV
2019: 3 x DUP, 2 x UUP, 1 x Alliance, 1 x SDLP
2014-2019 Change: DUP gain from TUV

Causeway - 7 seats
Party	Candidate	FPv%	Count							
Party	Candidate	FPv%	1	2	3	4	5	6	7	8
DUP	Mark Fielding*	15.69%	1,276							
Alliance	Chris McCaw*	14.91%	1,212							
DUP	Sharon McKillop*	12.42%	1,010	1,036.6						
DUP	John McAuley	10.22%	831	1,005.6	1,007.2	1,038.2	1,038.2			
UUP	Norman Hillis*	9.32%	758	785	802.28	821.96	833.16	833.16	857.76	1,005.04
UUP	Sandra Hunter*	9.52%	774	779.8	797.88	809.44	820.44	820.44	834.72	1,000.08
SDLP	Angela Mulholland* ‡	6.10%	496	498	548.88	551.04	554.52	761.12	919.6	926.12
Independent	David Alexander	6.79%	552	556.6	590.2	606.36	618.36	625.52	779.36	826.64
TUV	Cyril Quigg	4.00%	325	327.6	329.84	341.04	486.04	487.04	494.52	
Green (NI)	Mark Coulson	4.07%	331	333	387.08	397.08	401.24	437.2		
Sinn Féin	Emma Thompson	3.28%	267	267	269.88	269.88	269.88			
TUV	Stewart Moore	2.05%	167	171	172.76	192.12				
UKIP	Rebecca Hanna	1.62%	132	136	138.56					
Electorate: 16,918 Valid: 8,131 (48.06%) Spoilt: 89 Quota: 1,017 Turnout: 8,220 (48.58%)

=== Coleraine ===
2014: 2 x DUP, 2 x UUP, 1 x PUP, 1 x SDLP
2019: 2 x DUP, 1 x UUP, 1 x PUP, 1 x SDLP, 1 x Alliance
2014-2019 Change: Alliance gain from UUP

Coleraine - 6 seats
Party	Candidate	FPv%	Count				
Party	Candidate	FPv%	1	2	3	4	5
PUP	Russell Watton*	18.58%	1,325				
DUP	Philip Anderson	12.63%	901	987.48	1,013.85	1,031.85	
SDLP	Stephanie Quigley* ‡	13.78%	983	989.67	1,009.13	1,031.13	
Alliance	Yvonne Boyle	10.27%	732	734.99	765.91	780.83	1,057.83
DUP	George Duddy*	12.14%	866	942.36	972.35	992.11	992.43
UUP	William McCandless* ‡	8.88%	633	699.8	716.33	958.05	963.05
DUP	Trevor Clarke*	10.78%	769	817.07	835.60	857.35	861.35
Sinn Féin	Ciarán Archibald	5.85%	417	417.23	419.23	420.23	
UUP	John Wisener	4.09%	292	315.92	354.14		
NI Conservatives	David Harding*	1.57%	112	155.22			
UKIP	Amanda Ranaghan	1.42%	101	116.18			
Electorate: 15,879 Valid: 7,131 (44.90%) Spoilt: 77 Quota: 1,019 Turnout: 7,208 (45.39%)

=== Limavady ===
2014: 2 x DUP, 1 x Sinn Féin, 1 x SDLP, 1 x UUP
2019: 3 x DUP, 1 x Sinn Féin, 1 x SDLP
2014-2019 Change: DUP gain from UUP

Limavady - 5 seats
Party	Candidate	FPv%	Count					
Party	Candidate	FPv%	1	2	3	4	5	6
DUP	Alan Robinson* †	26.91%	1,498					
Sinn Féin	Brenda Chivers*	18.58%	1,034					
DUP	James McCorkell* ‡	11.75%	654	1,018.8				
DUP	Aaron Callan*	6.92%	385	533.58	534.13	603.21	615.19	922.91
SDLP	Ashleen Schenning	9.33%	519	523.94	578.5	585.5	810.91	831.38
Alliance	Kevin Hayward	10.01%	557	564.22	571.92	584.68	649.3	734.2
UUP	Raymond Kennedy	7.28%	405	424.76	425.09	510.04	513.04	
Aontú	Francie Brolly	6.06%	337	339.28	378	380.22		
TUV	Colin Cartwright	3.16%	176	190.82	191.15			
Electorate: 11,197 Valid: 5,565 (50.51%) Spoilt: 51 Quota: 928 Turnout: 5,616 (50.15%)

=== The Glens ===
2014: 2 x Sinn Féin, 1 x SDLP, 1 x UUP, 1 x Independent
2019: 2 x Sinn Féin, 1 x SDLP, 1 x UUP, 1 x Independent
2014-2019 Change: No change

The Glens - 5 seats
Party	Candidate	FPv%	Count					
Party	Candidate	FPv%	1	2	3	4	5	6
Independent	Ambrose Laverty †	18.81%	1,267					
Sinn Féin	Cara McShane*	16.36%	1,102	1,433				
Sinn Féin	Oliver McMullan	16.29%	1,097	1,298				
SDLP	Margret Anne McKillop*	16.03%	1,080	1,122	1,311			
UUP	Joan Baird*	11.25%	758	762	763	793	815	933.3
DUP	Bill Kennedy	12.51%	843	845	850	859	864	887.1
Sinn Féin	Kieran James Mulholland*	8.74%	589					
Electorate: 12,507 Valid: 6,736 (53.85%) Spoilt: 76 Quota: 1,123 Turnout: 6,812 (54.46%)

== Changes during the term ==
=== † Co-options ===
Date co-opted	Electoral Area	Party	Outgoing	Co-optee	Reason
4 October 2019	The Glens	Independent	Ambrose Laverty	Padraig McShane	Laverty resigned.
15 June 2022	Limavady	DUP	Alan Robinson	Steven Callaghan	Robinson was elected to the Northern Ireland Assembly.
23 August 2022	Ballymoney	Sinn Féin	Cathal McLaughlin	Ciarán McQuillan	McLaughlin resigned after being expelled from Sinn Féin.
25 August 2022	Ballymoney	DUP	John Finlay	Mervyn Storey	Finlay died.
31 March 2023	The Glens	Independent	Padraig McShane	vacant	McShane resigned and seat was not filled before May 2023 election.

=== ‡ Changes in affiliation ===
Date	Electoral Area	Name	Previous affiliation	New affiliation	Circumstance
21 Apr 2020	Coleraine	William McCandless	UUP	Independent	Decided to sit on the council as an independent.
8 July 2020	Coleraine	Stephanie Quigley	SDLP	Independent	Resigned from the SDLP over its stance on abortion.
23 July 2020	Causeway	Angela Mulholland	SDLP	Independent	Decided to sit on the council as an independent.
29 June 2021	Limavady	James McCorkell	DUP	Independent	Resigned from the DUP over disagreements with the new party leadership.
13 February 2023	Bann	Adrian McQuillan	DUP	Independent	Resigned from the DUP following his suspension from the party.

=== – Suspensions ===
None

Last updated 25 August 2022.

Current composition: see Causeway Coast and Glens Borough Council
