= Causeway (District Electoral Area) =

District electoral area in Northern Ireland

- Causeway Coast and Glens Borough Council DEA constituency

Current constituency
- Created: 2014
- Seats: 7 (2014-)
- Councillors: Mark Fielding (DUP); Sandra Hunter (UUP); Allister Kyle (TUV); John McAuley (DUP); Peter McCully (APNI); Sharon McKillop (DUP); Richard Stewart (APNI)

Causeway DEA within Causeway Coast and Glens

Causeway is one of the seven district electoral areas (DEA) in Causeway Coast and Glens, Northern Ireland. The district elects seven members to Causeway Coast and Glens Borough Council and contains the wards of Atlantic, Dervock, Dundoonan, Giant's Causeway, Hopefield, Portrush and Dunluce and Portstewart. Causeway forms part of the East Londonderry constituencies for the Northern Ireland Assembly and UK Parliament and part of the North Antrim constituencies for the Northern Ireland Assembly and UK Parliament.

It was created for the 2014 local elections, largely replacing The Skerries DEA and the Giant's Causeway DEA which had both existed since 1985.

== Councillors ==
Election	Councillor (Party)	Councillor (Party)	Councillor (Party)	Councillor (Party)	Councillor (Party)	Councillor (Party)	Councillor (Party)
2023	Peter McCully (Alliance)	Richard Stewart (Alliance)	Sandra Hunter (UUP)	Allister Kyle (TUV)	Sharon McKillop (DUP)/ (TUV)	John McAuley (DUP)	Mark Fielding (DUP)
July 2020 Defection	Chris McCaw (Alliance)	Angela Mulholland (SDLP)/ (Independent)	Sandra Hunter (UUP)	Norman Hillis (UUP)	Sharon McKillop (DUP)/ (TUV)	John McAuley (DUP)	Mark Fielding (DUP)
2019	Chris McCaw (Alliance)	Angela Mulholland (SDLP)/ (Independent)	Sandra Hunter (UUP)	Norman Hillis (UUP)	Sharon McKillop (DUP)/ (TUV)	John McAuley (DUP)	Mark Fielding (DUP)
November 2018 Defection	Chris McCaw (Alliance)	Angela Mulholland (SDLP)/ (Independent)	Sandra Hunter (UUP)	Norman Hillis (UUP)	Sharon McKillop (DUP)/ (TUV)	Frank Campbell (DUP)	Mark Fielding (DUP)
June 2018 Co-Option	Chris McCaw (Alliance)	Angela Mulholland (SDLP)/ (Independent)	Sandra Hunter (UUP)	Norman Hillis (UUP)	Sharon McKillop (DUP)/ (TUV)	Frank Campbell (DUP)	Mark Fielding (DUP)
January 2018 Co-Option	Barney Fitzpatrick (Alliance)	Angela Mulholland (SDLP)/ (Independent)	Sandra Hunter (UUP)	Norman Hillis (UUP)	Sharon McKillop (DUP)/ (TUV)	Frank Campbell (DUP)	Mark Fielding (DUP)
2014	Barney Fitzpatrick (Alliance)	Maura Hickey (SDLP)	Sandra Hunter (UUP)	Norman Hillis (UUP)	Sharon McKillop (DUP)/ (TUV)	Frank Campbell (DUP)	Mark Fielding (DUP)

== 2023 Election ==
2019: 3 x DUP, 2 x UUP, 1 x Alliance, 1 x SDLP

2023: 3 x DUP, 2 x Alliance, 1 x UUP, 1 x TUV

2019–2023 Change: Alliance and TUV gain from UUP and SDLP

Causeway - 7 seats
Party	Candidate	FPv%	Count									
Party	Candidate	FPv%	1	2	3	4	5	6	7	8	9	10
DUP	Mark Fielding*	14.81%	1,305									
Alliance	Peter McCully	10.49%	924	925.35	1,022.35	1,068.65	1,165.65					
UUP	Sandra Hunter*	9.00%	793	802.90	818.05	830.05	880.05	880.76	888.62	1,335.62		
DUP	John McAuley*	9.76%	860	992.15	995.45	1,003.60	1,032.20	1,032.91	1,034.06	1,072.91	1,142.60	
Alliance	Richard Stewart	5.31%	468	468.90	489.90	538.20	599.20	649.61	936.29	1,021.59	1,111.98	
TUV	Allister Kyle	9.84%	867	886.50	888.65	898.80	936.25	936.25	940.25	992.90	1,037.06	1,038.86
DUP	Sharon McKillop*	9.96%	878	899.00	900.15	909.45	925.60	925.60	929.60	963.20	992.18	1,030.43
Sinn Féin	Emma Thompson	8.11%	715	715.00	732.00	751.00	767.00	767.71	937.71	945.71	945.71	945.71
UUP	Barry Torrens	6.90%	608	613.70	625.70	663.85	738.60	739.61	766.31			
SDLP	Paul Shevlin	5.11%	450	450.30	491.30	530.30	562.30	572.24				
Independent	David Alexander	4.02%	354	355.80	375.80	476.95						
Independent	Angela Mulholland*	3.71%	327	328.50	353.65							
Green (NI)	Mark Coulson	2.97%	262	263.05								
Electorate: 17,620 Valid: 8,811 (50.01%) Spoilt: 97 Quota: 1,102 Turnout: 8,908 (50.55%)

== 2019 Election ==
2014: 2 x DUP, 2 x UUP, 1 x Alliance, 1 x SDLP, 1 x TUV

2019: 3 x DUP, 2 x UUP, 1 x Alliance, 1 x SDLP

2014-2019 Change: DUP gain from TUV

Causeway - 7 seats
Party	Candidate	FPv%	Count							
Party	Candidate	FPv%	1	2	3	4	5	6	7	8
DUP	Mark Fielding*	15.69%	1,276							
Alliance	Chris McCaw*	14.91%	1,212							
DUP	Sharon McKillop*	12.42%	1,010	1,036.6						
DUP	John McAuley	10.22%	831	1,005.6	1,007.2	1,038.2	1,038.2			
UUP	Norman Hillis*	9.32%	758	785	802.28	821.96	833.16	833.16	857.76	1,005.04
UUP	Sandra Hunter*	9.52%	774	779.8	797.88	809.44	820.44	820.44	834.72	1,000.08
SDLP	Angela Mulholland* ‡	6.10%	496	498	548.88	551.04	554.52	761.12	919.6	926.12
Independent	David Alexander	6.79%	552	556.6	590.2	606.36	618.36	625.52	779.36	826.64
TUV	Cyril Quigg	4.00%	325	327.6	329.84	341.04	486.04	487.04	494.52	
Green (NI)	Mark Coulson	4.07%	331	333	387.08	397.08	401.24	437.2		
Sinn Féin	Emma Thompson	3.28%	267	267	269.88	269.88	269.88			
TUV	Stewart Moore	2.05%	167	171	172.76	192.12				
UKIP	Rebecca Hanna	1.62%	132	136	138.56					
Electorate: 16,918 Valid: 8,131 (48.06%) Spoilt: 89 Quota: 1,017 Turnout: 8,220 (48.58%)

== 2014 Election ==
2014: 2 x DUP, 2 x UUP, 1 x TUV, 1 x Alliance, 1 x SDLP

Causeway - 7 seats
Party	Candidate	FPv%	Count									
Party	Candidate	FPv%	1	2	3	4	5	6	7	8	9	10
DUP	Frank Campbell*	12.28%	910	915	945							
DUP	Mark Fielding*	8.68%	643	647	655	666.16	702.16	884.16	923.16	940.16		
Alliance	Barney Fitzpatrick* †	10.06%	745	745	756	757.24	766.24	767.24	841.24	934.24		
UUP	Sandra Hunter*	10.28%	762	767	786	787.86	804.86	813.86	831.86	862.86	1,025.86	
UUP	Norman Hillis*	9.03%	669	671	679	679	707	712	749	773	983	
TUV	Sharon McKillop ‡	8.31%	616	721	773	773.62	830.62	834.62	845.62	865.62	895.62	923.17
SDLP	Maura Hickey* †	9.43%	699	699	699	699	708	709	733	802	813	827.25
DUP	Bill Kennedy*	6.71%	497	504	522	523.86	532.86	592.86	601.86	613.86	665.86	722.86
UUP	Robert McPherson	6.26%	464	471	475	475.62	488.62	496.62	499.62	525.62		
Independent	Alison Torrens	3.81%	282	283	307	307	320	320	363			
NI21	David Alexander	3.58%	265	265	277	277.62	290.62	291.62				
DUP	Angela Knott	3.51%	260	263	264	264	280					
UKIP	Adrian Parke	3.09%	229	244	252	252						
Independent	Leanne Abernethy	2.79%	207	211								
TUV	Thomas Stirling	2.17%	161									
Electorate: 16,548 Valid: 7,409 (44.77%) Spoilt: 99 Quota: 927 Turnout: 7,508 (45.37%)
