= Coleraine (District Electoral Area) =

District electoral area in Northern Ireland

- Causeway Coast and Glens Borough Council DEA constituency

Current constituency
- Created: 2014
- Seats: 6 (2014-)
- Councillors: Philip Anderson (DUP); Niamh Archibald (SF); Yvonne Boyle (APNI); Tanya Stirling (DUP); Russell Watton (PUP); John Wisener (UUP)

Coleraine DEA within Causeway Coast and Glens

Coleraine is one of the seven district electoral areas (DEA) in Causeway Coast and Glens, Northern Ireland. The district elects six members to Causeway Coast and Glens Borough Council and contains the wards of Churchland, Mountsandel, Quarry, University, Waterside and Windy Hall. Causeway forms part of the East Londonderry constituencies for the Northern Ireland Assembly and UK Parliament.

It was created for the 2014 local elections, largely replacing the Coleraine Central DEA and the Coleraine East DEA which had existed since 1993.

== Councillors ==
Election	Councillor (Party)	Councillor (Party)	Councillor (Party)	Councillor (Party)	Councillor (Party)	Councillor (Party)
2023	Niamh Archibald (Sinn Féin)	Yvonne Boyle (Alliance)	John Wisener (UUP)	Russell Watton (PUP)	Philip Anderson (DUP)	Tanya Stirling (DUP)
July 2020 Defection	Stephanie Quigley (SDLP)/ (Independent)	Yvonne Boyle (Alliance)	William McCandless (UUP)/ (Independent)	Russell Watton (PUP)	Philip Anderson (DUP)	George Duddy (DUP)
April 2020 Defection	Stephanie Quigley (SDLP)/ (Independent)	Yvonne Boyle (Alliance)	William McCandless (UUP)/ (Independent)	Russell Watton (PUP)	Philip Anderson (DUP)	George Duddy (DUP)
2019	Stephanie Quigley (SDLP)/ (Independent)	Yvonne Boyle (Alliance)	William McCandless (UUP)/ (Independent)	Russell Watton (PUP)	Philip Anderson (DUP)	George Duddy (DUP)
April 2016 Defection	Stephanie Quigley (SDLP)/ (Independent)	David Harding (Conservative)/ (Independent)/ (UUP)	William McCandless (UUP)/ (Independent)	Russell Watton (PUP)	Trevor Clarke (DUP)	George Duddy (DUP)
February 2015 Defection	Stephanie Quigley (SDLP)/ (Independent)	David Harding (Conservative)/ (Independent)/ (UUP)	William McCandless (UUP)/ (Independent)	Russell Watton (PUP)	Trevor Clarke (DUP)	George Duddy (DUP)
2014	Stephanie Quigley (SDLP)/ (Independent)	David Harding (Conservative)/ (Independent)/ (UUP)	William McCandless (UUP)/ (Independent)	Russell Watton (PUP)	Trevor Clarke (DUP)	George Duddy (DUP)

== 2023 Election ==
2019: 2 x DUP, 1 x PUP, 1 x SDLP, 1 x UUP, 1 x Alliance

2023: 2 x DUP, 1 x PUP, 1 x Alliance, 1 x Sinn Féin, 1 x UUP

2019–2023 Change: Sinn Féin gain from SDLP

Coleraine - 6 seats
Party	Candidate	FPv%	Count									
Party	Candidate	FPv%	1	2	3	4	5	6	7	8	9	10
DUP	Philip Anderson*	18.79%	1,389									
PUP	Russell Watton*	13.74%	1,016	1,055.12	1,066.12							
Alliance	Yvonne Boyle*	12.81%	947	952.04	1,041.04	1,049.04	1,220.04					
Sinn Féin	Niamh Archibald	11.61%	858	858.72	892.96	894.96	1,023.96	1,035.68	1,117.68			
UUP	John Wisener	9.75%	721	730.84	739.84	799.00	815.00	1,019.32	1,046.32	1,067.32		
DUP	Tanya Stirling	5.97%	441	623.40	629.64	747.40	757.64	907.80	908.80	910.80	913.80	913.80
DUP	Adele Tomb	8.86%	655	714.04	721.04	805.40	809.64	901.08	901.08	904.08	907.08	910.08
Independent	George Duddy*	6.09%	450	470.40	487.64	553.08	566.32					
SDLP	Helen Maher	4.45%	329	330.20	380.20	383.20						
TUV	Michael Sweeney	4.59%	339	351.72	358.44							
People Before Profit	Amy Merron	3.34%	247	248.44								
Electorate: 16,874 Valid: 7,392 (43.81%) Spoilt: 97 Quota: 1,057 Turnout: 7,489 (44.38%)

== 2019 Election ==
2014: 2 x DUP, 2 x UUP, 1 x PUP, 1 x SDLP

2019: 2 x DUP, 1 x UUP, 1 x PUP, 1 x SDLP, 1 x Alliance

2014-2019 Change: Alliance gain from UUP

Coleraine - 6 seats
Party	Candidate	FPv%	Count				
Party	Candidate	FPv%	1	2	3	4	5
PUP	Russell Watton*	18.58%	1,325				
DUP	Philip Anderson	12.63%	901	987.48	1,013.85	1,031.85	
SDLP	Stephanie Quigley* ‡	13.78%	983	989.67	1,009.13	1,031.13	
Alliance	Yvonne Boyle	10.27%	732	734.99	765.91	780.83	1,057.83
DUP	George Duddy*	12.14%	866	942.36	972.35	992.11	992.43
UUP	William McCandless* ‡	8.88%	633	699.8	716.33	958.05	963.05
DUP	Trevor Clarke*	10.78%	769	817.07	835.60	857.35	861.35
Sinn Féin	Ciarán Archibald	5.85%	417	417.23	419.23	420.23	
UUP	John Wisener	4.09%	292	315.92	354.14		
NI Conservatives	David Harding*	1.57%	112	155.22			
UKIP	Amanda Ranaghan	1.42%	101	116.18			
Electorate: 15,879 Valid: 7,131 (44.90%) Spoilt: 77 Quota: 1,019 Turnout: 7,208 (45.39%)

== 2014 Election ==
2014: 2 x DUP, 2 x UUP, 1 x PUP, 1 x SDLP

Coleraine - 6 seats
Party	Candidate	FPv%	Count									
Party	Candidate	FPv%	1	2	3	4	5	6	7	8	9	10
PUP	Russell Watton	11.84%	777	779	812	938						
SDLP	Stephanie Quigley*	10.99%	721	734	745	755	758	1,016				
DUP	George Duddy*	10.82%	710	712	728	752	813	815	1,041			
UUP	William McCandless*	9.77%	641	654	674	698	756	758	772	773.84	837.84	847.84
DUP	Trevor Clarke*	9.56%	627	629	645	664	727	728	783	847.86	878.32	881.32
UUP	David Harding ‡‡	8.22%	539	546	557	571	634	637	661	662.38	747.38	760.38
DUP	Tracy Craig	7.36%	483	483	490	505	553	557	621	653.66	674.66	677.66
Alliance	Yvonne Boyle*	6.22%	408	450	460	474	482	520	527	527.46		
DUP	Phyllis Fielding*	5.49%	360	363	368	384	409	410				
Sinn Féin	Margaret Fleming	5.84%	383	384	387	389	389					
TUV	Tommy Collins	4.98%	327	328	360	378						
Independent	Billy Ellis	4.33%	284	288	300							
UKIP	William Ogilby	2.85%	187	200								
NI21	Chris McCaw	1.72%	113									
Electorate: 15,443 Valid: 6,560 (42.48%) Spoilt: 79 Quota: 938 Turnout: 6,639 (42.99%)
