= Causeway Coast and Glens Borough Council =

Local authority in Northern Ireland

Type
- Type: District council of Causeway Coast and Glens

History
- Founded: 1 April 2015
- Preceded by: Ballymoney Borough Council; Coleraine Borough Council; Limavady Borough Council; Moyle District Council

Leadership
- Mayor: Dawn Huggins, Democratic Unionist Party
- Deputy Mayor: Sandra Hunter, UUP

Structure
- Seats: 40
- Graph of the party split among 40 seats.
- Political groups: All parties (40) DUP (13) Sinn Féin (12) Alliance (5) SDLP (2) UUP (3) TUV (2) PUP (1) Aontú (1) Independent (1)
- Length of term: 4 years

Elections
- Voting system: Single transferable vote
- Last election: 18 May 2023
- Next election: 6 May 2027

Meeting place
- Coolnavin, 66 Portstewart Road, Coleraine, BT52 1EY

Website
- www.causewaycoastandglens.gov.uk

Causeway Coast and Glens Borough Council is a local authority in Northern Ireland that was established on 1 April 2015. It covers most of the northern coast of Northern Ireland and replaced Ballymoney Borough Council, Coleraine Borough Council, Limavady Borough Council and Moyle District Council. The area covered by the council has a population of 141,745 residents as at the 2021 census.

The first elections to the authority were on 22 May 2014 and it acted as a shadow authority, prior to the creation of the Causeway Coast and Glens district on 1 April 2015.

== Mayoralty ==
=== Mayor ===
| From | To | Name | Party |
|---|---|---|---|
| 2015 | 2016 | Michelle Knight-McQuillan | DUP |
| 2016 | 2017 | Maura Hickey | SDLP |
| 2017 | 2018 | Joan Baird | UUP |
| 2018 | 2019 | Brenda Chivers | Sinn Féin |
| 2019 | 2020 | Sean Bateson | Sinn Féin |
| 2020 | 2021 | Mark Fielding | DUP |
| 2021 | 2022 | Richard Holmes | UUP |
| 2022 | 2023 | Ivor Wallace | DUP |
| 2023 | 2024 | Steven Callaghan | DUP |
| 2024 | 2025 | Ciarán McQuillan | Sinn Féin |
| 2025 | 2026 | Oliver McMullan | Sinn Féin |
| 2026 | Present | Dawn Huggins | DUP |

=== Deputy Mayor ===
| From | To | Name | Party |
|---|---|---|---|
| 2015 | 2016 | Darryl Wilson | UUP |
| 2016 | 2017 | James McCorkell | DUP |
| 2017 | 2018 | Cathal McLaughlin | Sinn Féin |
| 2018 | 2019 | Trevor Clarke | DUP |
| 2019 | 2020 | Sharon McKillop | DUP |
| 2020 | 2021 | Tom McKeown | UUP |
| 2021 | 2022 | Ashleen Schenning | SDLP |
| 2022 | 2023 | Kathleen McGurk | Sinn Féin |
| 2023 | 2024 | Margaret-Anne McKillop | SDLP |
| 2024 | 2025 | Tanya Stirling | DUP |
| 2025 | 2026 | Richard Stewart | Alliance |
| 2026 | Present | Sandra Hunter | UUP |

== Councillors ==
For the purpose of elections the council is divided into seven district electoral areas (DEA):

| Area | Seats |
|---|---|
| Ballymoney | 7 |
| Bann | 5 |
| Benbradagh | 5 |
| Causeway | 7 |
| Coleraine | 6 |
| Limavady | 5 |
| The Glens | 5 |

=== Seat summary ===
| Party | Elected 2014 | Elected 2019 | Elected 2023 | Current |
|---|---|---|---|---|
| DUP | 11 | 14 | 13 | 13 |
| Sinn Féin | 7 | 9 | 12 | 12 |
| Alliance | 1 | 2 | 5 | 5 |
| UUP | 10 | 7 | 4 | 3 |
| SDLP | 6 | 6 | 3 | 2 |
| TUV | 3 | 0 | 2 | 2 |
| PUP | 1 | 1 | 1 | 1 |
| Aontú | 0 | 0 | 0 | 1 |

=== Councillors by electoral area ===
Borders of the DEAs within Causeway Coast and Glens

Current council members
| District electoral area | Name | Party |
|---|---|---|
| Ballymoney | Mervyn Storey | DUP |
| Ballymoney | Ciarán McQuillan | Sinn Féin |
| Ballymoney | Darryl Wilson ‡ | DUP |
| Ballymoney | Leanne Peacock | Sinn Féin |
| Ballymoney | Ivor Wallace ‡ | Independent |
| Ballymoney | Lee Kane | Alliance |
| Ballymoney | Jonathan McAuley | TUV |
| Bann | Sean Bateson | Sinn Féin |
| Bann | Michelle Knight-McQuillan | DUP |
| Bann | Dawn Higgins | DUP |
| Bann | Ciarán Archibald | Sinn Féin |
| Bann | Richard Holmes | UUP |
| Benbradagh | Seán McGlinchey | Sinn Féin |
| Benbradagh | Dermot Nicholl | Sinn Féin |
| Benbradagh | Kathleen McGurk | Sinn Féin |
| Benbradagh | Edgar Scott | DUP |
| Benbradagh | Michael Coyle | SDLP |
| Causeway | Mark Fielding | DUP |
| Causeway | Peter McCully | Alliance |
| Causeway | Sandra Hunter | UUP |
| Causeway | John McAuley | DUP |
| Causeway | Richard Stewart | Alliance |
| Causeway | Allister Kyle | TUV |
| Causeway | Sharon McKillop | DUP |
| Coleraine | Philip Anderson | DUP |
| Coleraine | Russell Watton | PUP |
| Coleraine | Yvonne Boyle | Alliance |
| Coleraine | Niamh Archibald | Sinn Féin |
| Coleraine | John Wisener | UUP |
| Coleraine | Tanya Stirling | DUP |
| Limavady | Brenda Chivers | Sinn Féin |
| Limavady | Steven Callaghan | DUP |
| Limavady | Ashleen Schenning | SDLP |
| Limavady | Aaron Callan | DUP |
| Limavady | Amy Mairs | Alliance |
| The Glens | Cara McShane | Sinn Féin |
| The Glens | Oliver McMullan | Sinn Féin |
| The Glens | Mairghéad Watson | Sinn Féin |
| The Glens | Bill Kennedy | DUP |
| The Glens | Margret Anne McKillop ‡ | Aontú |

== Arms ==
Coat of arms of Causeway Coast and Glens Borough Council

Notes
Granted 4 October 2017 by the College of Arms.
Crest
Rocks of the Giants' Causeway issuing therefrom a fountain Proper surmounted by a salmon haurient Or.
Torse
Or and Azure.
Escutcheon
Per saltire Azure and Or an anchor and an anchor reversed in pale Or and two garbs in fess Gules.
Supporters
Dexter a dragon sinister an Irish wolf-hound both Azure and gorged with a mural crown Or.

== See also ==
- Local government in Northern Ireland
- 2014 Northern Ireland local elections
- Political make-up of local councils in the United Kingdom
