= Russell Watton =

Northern Irish Ulster loyalist politician (born 1954)

Leader of the Progressive Unionist Party
- Incumbent
- Assumed office 14 June 2023
- Preceded by: Billy Hutchinson

Deputy leader of the Progressive Unionist Party
- In office 15 October 2022 – 14 June 2023
- Leader: Billy Hutchinson
- Preceded by: John Kyle

Causeway Coast and Glens Borough Councillor
- Incumbent
- Assumed office 22 May 2014
- Preceded by: New council
- Constituency: Coleraine

Personal details
- Born: March 1954 Coleraine, Northern Ireland
- Party: Progressive Unionist Party (since 2014)
- Other political affiliations: Independent (2005-2014)

Military service
- Paramilitary: Ulster Volunteer Force
- Rank: Officer Commanding
- Conflict: The Troubles

William James Russell Watton (born March 1954), known as Russell Watton, is a Northern Irish Ulster loyalist, politician and community activist, serving as leader of the Progressive Unionist Party (PUP) since 2023, and a Causeway Coast and Glens Borough Councillor for the Coleraine DEA since 2014. He was also PUP deputy leader between 2022 and 2023.

== Background ==
=== Ulster Volunteer Force ===
Watton joined the Ulster Volunteer Force (UVF) in the 1970s, and was believed to be the commander of the UVF unit in Coleraine. He was involved in the bombing of the Salmon Leap Restaurant, which caused the deaths of several of Watton's UVF comrades.

He received three life sentences in 1977, and was imprisoned until his release in 1989.

== Political career ==
At the 2005 local elections, Watton ran as an independent candidate, for the Central District, in the Coleraine Authority. While out campaigning in the predominantly nationalist Somerset Drive area, Watton and his campaign team were threatened by a group of activists after putting up posters. On the incident, Watton said: “One of them had a knife in his hand and he confronted me with it. I was forced to use a piece of wood which these scumbags had thrown and I was able to disarm the man to defend myself and he ran off." In total, he polled 380 first-preference votes, and was eliminated on the sixth count.

Watton stood again in the district at the 2011 local elections, taking 342 first-preferences.

=== Causeway Coast and Glens Councillor ===
By the 2014 local elections, Watton was a member of the Progressive Unionist Party (PUP), standing for them in the successor Causeway Coast and Glens Authority. He topped the poll in the Coleraine District, and received 11.8% of first-preferences.

Watton stood in the East Londonderry constituency at the 2016 Northern Ireland Assembly election, where he took 1,356 first-preference votes (3.9%). At the 2017 Assembly election, Watton was eliminated on the third stage of counting, having polled 879 first-preferences (2.1%).

At the May 2019 Council election, Watton was once again the first candidate to be elected in Coleraine, with an increased total of 1,325 first-preferences. Shortly after the election, he caused controversy when he told the Coleraine Chronicle that he had "no regrets" over his involvement with the UVF during the Troubles.

In March 2020, Watton voted against a Sinn Fein motion, which would have seen the council fly the Rainbow flag during Foyle Pride. He said: "If they get putting up an LGBT flag, then we will be putting up flags for Polish independence or homelessness. When do they stop?" The motion was ultimately unsuccessful.

During the 2022 Assembly election, Watton reported intimidation by 'known drug dealers,' including the defacement of one of his election posters with an image of a balaclava. In the election, he took 933 first-preference votes (2.1%), and was eliminated on the third count.

Watton was the second candidate to be returned in the district at the May 2023 local elections, taking a decreased first-preference share of 13.7%. Notably, he became the only elected representative for the PUP, following the defeat of their leader, Billy Hutchinson, in Belfast.

==== Leader of the Progressive Unionist Party ====
Following the local election results, Hutchinson stood down as leader, with Watton being announced as his successor on 14 June 2023.
