= Britain First =

British fascist political party

- Leader: Paul Golding
- Founder: Jim Dowson
- Founded: 2011; 15 years ago
- Split from: British National Party
- Security wing: Britain First Defence Force
- Ideology: Fascism (British); Ultranationalism; British unionism; Hard Euroscepticism
- Political position: Far-right
- Colours: Red White Blue

Party flag
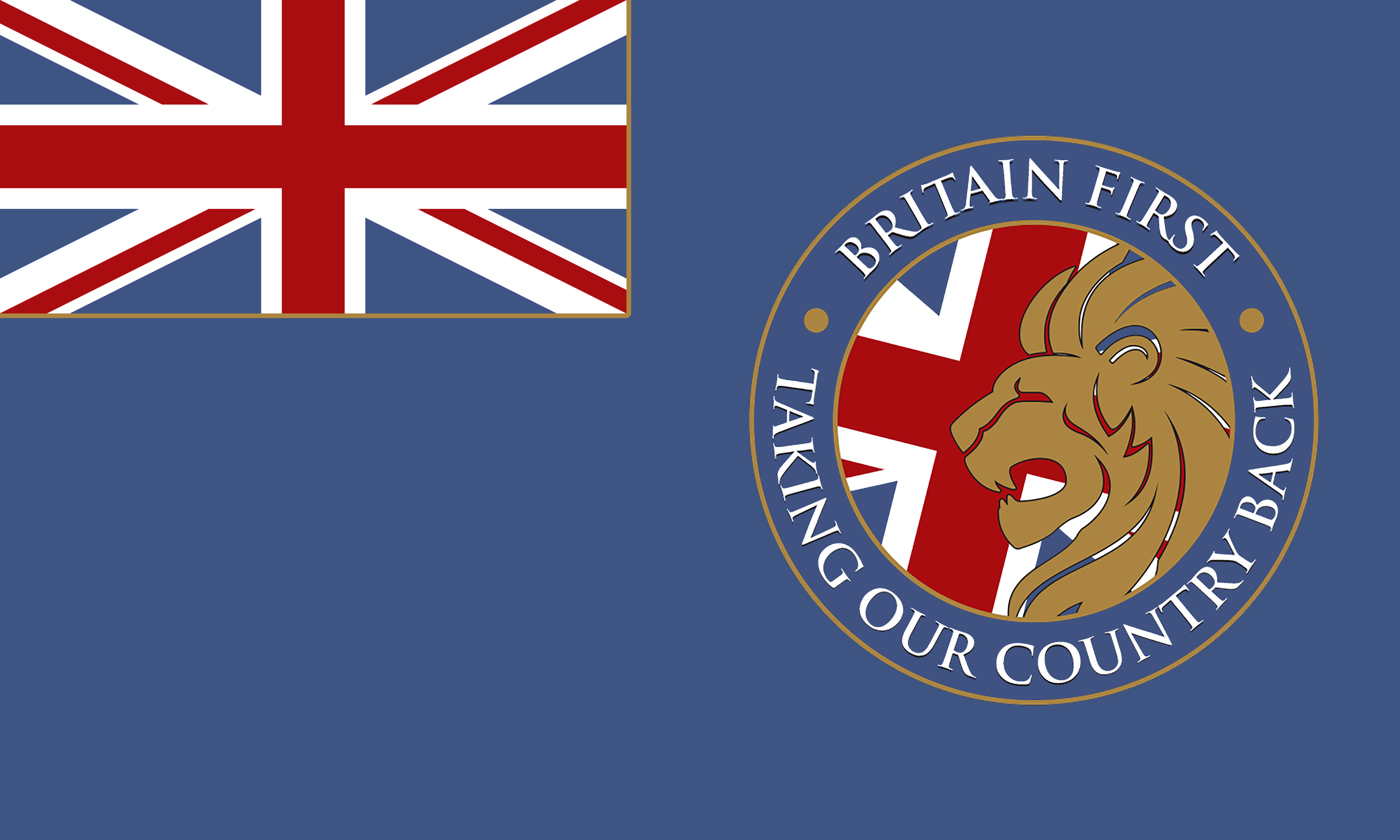

Website
- britainfirst.org

Britain First is a far-right, British fascist political party and hate group formed in 2011 by former members of the British National Party (BNP). The group was founded by Jim Dowson, an anti-abortion and far-right campaigner. The organisation's co-leaders are former BNP councillor Paul Golding and Ashlea Simon. Jayda Fransen formerly served as its deputy leader.

Britain First is Islamophobic and campaigns primarily against British Muslims and multiculturalism, and advocates the preservation of what it sees to be traditional British culture. It attracted attention by taking direct action such as "Christian patrols" and "invasions" of British mosques. It has been noted for its online activism. It maintains its own security or militia wing, the Britain First Defence Force.

Britain First registered with the Electoral Commission on 10 January 2014; in November 2017, it was statutorily deregistered as a political party by the Electoral Commission after it failed to renew its registration in time. It re-registered in September 2021. Britain First has unsuccessfully contested elections to the House of Commons, the European Parliament, local government, and mayoralty of London.

== History ==
Britain First was founded by Jim Dowson, who ran a call centre in Dundonald, East Belfast, for the BNP. Dowson's links with the BNP as a fundraiser ended acrimoniously in October 2010 when he was accused of groping a female activist. Dowson is a Scottish Christian fundamentalist. Based in Ballygowan, Northern Ireland, he also led an anti-abortion campaign, the UK Life League. He is linked to Ulster loyalist groups in Northern Ireland.

Other former officials from the BNP joined Dowson in the formation of Britain First. Its current leader, Paul Golding, had been a district councillor in Sevenoaks, Kent, in 2009–2011 representing the BNP, as well as the BNP's Communications Officer. Britain First was launched through the "British Resistance" website in May 2011. Others involved in Britain First's launch included the former South East regional organiser of the BNP, Andy McBride, and Kevin Edwards, a former BNP councillor and organiser in Wales.

The party's structure is similar to that of Ulster loyalist groups in Northern Ireland, insofar as the group has a political wing backed up by a paramilitary action force (named "Britain First Defence Force"). The action force's members assume titles such as "provost marshal", and a document written by Jim Dowson said that "I have lived in the worst trouble spots of Belfast; I have had high powered machine gun fire rip bricks from my house and have been injured by grenade attack. Sometimes we had to defend our homes from the traditional enemy, other times from the forces of the state, the police and army."

Britain First announced in 2014 its intention to launch in America as "America First" (not to be confused with America First Party or President Donald Trump's 2018 United States federal budget, America First), but it failed to materialise.

Britain First owes much of its influence to the rise of social media. When Facebook was initially pressed on the matter of allowing Britain First on its platform, it simply stated, "Facebook is used by parties and supporters of many political persuasions to campaign for issues they feel passionately about."

In November 2015, Britain First said that its Facebook page had over a million "likes", more than any other British political party or the British Prime Minister, David Cameron. At the end of November, Facebook briefly closed the Britain First page for breaching its community guidelines. The group also had to remove two photos published without permission. It later called Facebook "fascist". By October 2017, it had 2 million Facebook followers.

Despite the initial unwillingness to regulate Britain First and similar movements, public pressure continued to mount. In December 2017, Twitter suspended the accounts of Britain First and its leaders Golding and Fransen, after revising its rules on hate speech. When asked, Twitter declined to comment, citing privacy and security reasons. In March 2018, Britain First was banned from Facebook, which said it broke community guidelines and was designed to incite racial hatred. In its official statement on the matter, Facebook stated that this was due to "repeatedly posted content designed to incite animosity and hatred against minority groups". This was received very positively among many across the political spectrum. In a statement, the Mayor of London, Sadiq Khan said, "Britain First is a vile and hate-fuelled group whose sole purpose is to sow division. Their sick intentions to incite hatred within our society via social media are reprehensible, and Facebook’s decision to remove their content is welcome."

In January 2019, after a period in prison for religiously aggravated harassment, Jayda Fransen stepped down from her position as deputy leader and left the party completely.

=== National People's Party ===
In November 2011, Britain First announced the registration of a political party, the "National People's Party", with Golding named as leader, Edwards as nominating officer and McBride as treasurer. However, the Electoral Commission register shows Britain First listed itself from November 2011 as a political party, with the same roles for the three officers, and no current or past listing for a National People's Party, so it is not clear whether the National People's Party has a separate existence. The Britain First website carries a constitution for the Party stating, among other things, that "The campaign group Britain First will ... be entitled to put forward a representative to sit on the Standing Committee", a six-person group "tasked with the direction of the Party and running all its affairs".

=== Northern Ireland offshoot ===
The principal figures in Britain First, Dowson and Golding, launched a new political party in Northern Ireland in April 2013. Dowson was registered with the Electoral Commission as the Protestant Coalition's leader, and Golding as its treasurer. However, Dowson stated at the launch that the Coalition had no single leader.

Golding had flown into Belfast in December 2012 to help co-ordinate protests over the decision by Belfast City Council to limit the flying of the Union Flag over Belfast City Hall. Dowson had been prominent in the protests, and at the time of the launch, was awaiting trial for public order offences, as was another of the Coalition's founders, Willie Frazer.

The website and logo of the Protestant Coalition closely resembled those of Britain First, although neither site explicitly mentioned an organisational link.

=== Departure of Jim Dowson ===
In July 2014, founder Jim Dowson left Britain First. The Daily Mirror and The Independent wrote that Dowson left because of the party's "mosque invasions", which he considered to be "provocative and counterproductive", as well as "unacceptable and unchristian" and "just as bad" as Anjem Choudary. Paul Golding reacted to this by saying that Britain First was, "as far as right-wing organisations go, relatively scandal-free".

Britain First itself denied the Mirror's story, calling it "chief communist newspaper and lover of all things anti-British". The party claimed to have published a farewell letter from Dowson, in which he cited fatigue and the safety of his family as his reasons to leave.

=== Appeal to Polish immigrants to join ===
In July 2017, it was reported by BBC News that a string of Britain First videos designed to attract a Polish audience had appeared online, including a video from Jacek Miedlar, a Polish far-right former priest, an interview with a Polish media outlet that has over half a million views, and videos by Polish Britain First supporters encouraging others to support the party.

On 23 June 2017, Marek Zakrocki, a 48-year-old Polish-born Britain First supporter, shouted, "White power" and gave a Nazi salute as he used a white van in an attempt to run over Kamal Ahmed, a curry house owner. The van mounted the pavement twice before making contact with Ahmed and the windows of the curry house were also smashed. Hours earlier, Zakrocki had told the police, "I'm going to kill a Muslim. I'm doing it for Britain." Copies of Britain First newspapers and flyers were found in Zakrocki's home and he also said he had donated money to the organisation.

=== Support for Boris Johnson ===
In September 2019, Britain First's former deputy leader Jayda Fransen declared that she was "actually delighted at Boris's work so far" and called for an alliance between the Conservative Party and the Brexit Party in the next general election.

Following Johnson's victory in the 2019 United Kingdom general election, Britain First sent an email to supporters calling on them to join the Conservative Party in order "to make Boris Johnson's leadership more secure", stating that its chief of staff had campaigned for the Conservatives at the last election, and expressing a desire to play an equivalent role to that of Momentum within the Labour Party. Subsequently, Britain First's leader, Paul Golding, announced that he had joined the Conservative Party, hailing Johnson's remarks on the burqa as evidence that Johnson is a "populist nationalist under the surface". However, the party said that his application had not been approved.

On 28 December 2019, Britain First claimed that 5,000 of its members had joined the Conservatives in order to "support Boris Johnson’s stance on radical Islam". Britain First's spokeswoman, Ashlea Simon, stated that the organisation's followers "appreciate Priti Patel's and Boris Johnson's hardline approach" to terrorism.

== Electoral history ==
=== 2014–2016 ===
Britain First registered with the Electoral Commission on 10 January 2014. In 2014, the party registered the phrase "Remember Lee Rigby" for use in the 2014 European elections. The chair of the Electoral Commission later issued an apology "for the offence that has been caused" by accepting the registration. When questioned by Andrew Neil on the BBC's Daily Politics about the offence caused to Rigby's mother, Paul Golding said, "We apologise to the mother of Lee Rigby, but it was a major act of terrorism, it was a big public event. He was a serving soldier." Britain First stood candidates for the 2014 European elections in Wales and Scotland. It encouraged English supporters, in the absence of a Britain First candidate, to instead vote for the English Democrats or the UK Independence Party (UKIP), while warning against voting for the BNP. The party came 8th of 11 in Wales, with 6,633 votes (0.9%), and 7th of 9 in Scotland with 13,639 votes (1.02%, more than the BNP).

European Parliament
Election year	# of total votes	% of overall vote	# of seats won	Change
2014	20,272 #24	0.1%	0 / 73	Steady

Britain First stood its first parliamentary candidate for the Rochester and Strood by-election on 20 November 2014, nominating its Deputy Leader, Jayda Fransen. The party had been active in nearby Gillingham in opposition to a planned mosque. Royal Mail refused to deliver a leaflet for the party because it believed it to be illegal. The company said it could refuse to carry election mail if it considered the contents threatening or abusive. UKIP won the by-election. Britain First finished 9th of 13 candidates, with 56 votes (0.14%), finishing below the Monster Raving Loony Party (with 151 votes, 0.38%) and above the Patriotic Socialist Party (with 33 votes, 0.08%). At the count, the BBC News reporter Nick Robinson was criticised on Twitter for taking a selfie with Fransen, stating that he did not know who she was and that he would check before appearing in any future photographs.

On 27 September 2015, Paul Golding announced that he would stand as a candidate in the 2016 London mayoral election. He received 31,372 or 1.2% of the vote, coming eighth of twelve candidates. During the victory speech of Labour's Sadiq Khan, he turned his back.

=== 2017–2021 ===
In November 2017, Britain First was statutorily deregistered as a political party by the Electoral Commission, after it failed to renew its registration in time. The group was fined £44,000 in July 2019 by the Electoral Commission for a number of offences including undeclared donations and a failure to provide proper accounts. On 27 September 2021, Britain First's application to be registered as a political party was approved by the Electoral Commission. Golding then announced that the party intended to stand candidates for election in the near future.

=== 2022–2024 ===
Britain First fielded three candidates in the local elections on 5 May 2022. Its best result was for Ashlea Simon, chairwoman and treasurer of the party, who came second in the Walkden North ward of Salford City Council with 508 votes and 21.6% vote share. In the Brynna and Llanharan ward of Rhondda Cynon Taf County Borough Council, BF finished last with 191 votes and 3.6% vote share. In the Eltham Page ward of Greenwich London Borough Council, its candidate came 6th out of 7 with 255 votes and a 6.4% vote share.

Simon was the Britain First candidate in the 2022 Wakefield by-election. She finished 8th of 15 candidates, with 311 votes (1.1%). She was also the Britain First candidate in the 2023 Tamworth by-election. She finished 4th of 9 candidates, with 580 votes (2.3%) getting more votes than the Liberal Democrats, the Green party and UKIP.

In the local elections on 4 May 2023, Britain First stood eight candidates. Golding stood in Swanscombe in Dartford, receiving 8.9% of the votes cast, while Deputy Leader Ashlea Simon stood for a second time in Walkden North, Salford, receiving 18.1% of the votes cast, neither succeeding in their bid.

Alex Merola was the Britain First candidate in the 2024 Wellingborough by-election. He finished 8th of 11 candidates, with 477 votes (1.6%). Nick Scanlon was the Britain First candidate in the 2024 London mayoral election. He received 20,519 or 0.8% of the vote, coming twelfth of thirteen candidates, behind Count Binface, a parody candidate. In the 2024 London Assembly election the party received 32,085 or 1.3% of the vote, coming eighth out of fifteen.

== Protests and actions ==
=== Harassment ===
In May 2013, following the murder of Lee Rigby, Britain First released a video threatening to place Muslim cleric Anjem Choudary, who was accused of radicalising Rigby's killers, under citizen's arrest if the Metropolitan Police would not arrest him.

On 5 January 2015, a district judge at Chelmsford Magistrates' Court found Paul Golding guilty of harassing the sister-in-law of a man allegedly linked to the 7 July bombings, having mistakenly turned up at her house instead of his. District Judge David Woollard fined Golding £325 and a further £100 for wearing a political uniform.

=== Christian patrol ===
In February 2014, Britain First conducted what it called "Christian patrols" in an area of Tower Hamlets, East London, to counter continuing Muslim Patrols which had first come to media attention in 2013. Around a dozen or so Britain First activists recorded themselves holding a banner proclaiming "We Are The British Resistance" and emptying cans of beer outside a mosque to harass people in the area. A video uploaded onto social media showing the event gained national media attention in the UK, and the patrol was condemned by Muslim and Christian leaders in the area.

=== Entry of mosques and distribution of leaflets and Bibles ===
In May 2014, members of Britain First invaded ten Bradford mosques, as well as ones in Glasgow, Luton and East London. During the mosque invasions, some of which they filmed, uniformed members of Britain First presented worshippers with army-issue Bibles and with leaflets on grooming gangs: they confronted elders about alleged "Muslim grooming gangs" in the area; and they proselytised Christianity, telling one person to "reject the false prophet Muhammad and read the Bible". In Bradford they also went to the re-election campaign office of a Muslim city councillor, demanding action on grooming gangs and telling him that he "had been warned". In response, the Member of Parliament for Bradford West George Galloway said, "This is a grave and national issue. We demand full police action and protection of Mosques and worshippers." The police said that they were investigating.

In July 2014, Britain First entered the Crayford Mosque in South London, demanding that its segregated entrances be removed, with Golding saying, "When you respect women we'll respect your mosques." A volunteer of the local Muslim association called Britain First "filthy people creating trouble in our society". Two addresses were raided during the police investigation of this action, which led Britain First to protest at Bexleyheath Police Station. They sought to gain publicity by claiming that Golding was arrested for this protest, although the Metropolitan Police said that they had spoken with him and no arrests had been made. Golding was jailed for eight weeks in December 2016 for breaking a court order banning him from entering mosques or encouraging others to do so.

=== Rotherham ===
In August 2014, after a report which revealed that over 1,400 children had been sexually abused in Rotherham, mainly by Pakistani men, Britain First protested inside the headquarters of Rotherham Metropolitan Borough Council with a banner saying "Justice for victims of Muslim grooming".

=== Claimed defence of Nigel Farage ===
In May 2014, Britain First announced that it would be deploying "hundreds of ex-British Forces" alongside "several armoured ex-army Land Rovers" to protect the UKIP leader Nigel Farage after he had been opposed on the street by supporters of Scottish independence. Whilst acknowledging that UKIP and Britain First were "rival" right-wing organisations, it stated that the two parties remain "patriots together" and as such it was willing to "put our men and our resources at UKIP's disposal".

In March 2015, a group of anti-UKIP protesters went to a pub where Farage and his family were dining and allegedly scared his children into running away. Later that month Britain First went to that group's meeting in London "to give these traitors their comeuppance". No injuries were reported, but a 48-year-old man was arrested on suspicion of assault.

UKIP rejects associations with Britain First, stating, "On the fringes of our politics are nutters and we don't want them anywhere near us".

=== Jews in London ===
In 2015, Britain First offered "solidarity patrols" in areas of London with high Jewish populations, while blaming antisemitism on Muslims. The Community Security Trust, an organisation against anti-Semitism, has warned Jews not to become involved with Britain First, and has likened this policy to similar ones by the English Defence League and the BNP, saying that all of these groups were opposing Muslims more than supporting Jews.

=== Calais ===
Britain First visited the French port of Calais in the middle of 2015, during a period of attempted migration to the United Kingdom via the town. Afterwards, the party was approached by the documentary maker Ross Kemp to feature in a documentary film about the contemporary rise in nationalism. The party rejected Kemp's offer, calling him a "leftwing actor"; a producer responded by saying that Kemp listens to all opinions. At the same time, the organisation were recorded for a BBC Three documentary titled We Want Our Country Back.

=== Asylum seekers in hotels ===
In August 2020, Britain First posted a video of members entering a hotel in Bromsgrove used for housing asylum seekers. They knocked on doors and attempted to question residents. Police were also called to a number of other incidents across the country. On 29 August a man was arrested and charged with assault after a group had entered a hotel in Coventry and a staff member was assaulted.

== Policies ==
The organisation has been described as fascist by The New Yorker, Politics.co.uk, GQ, The Independent, and others. The group's website has disputed this, listing fascism as one of several "alien and destructive political or religious doctrines" it opposes. OpenDemocracy has said that Britain First is not fascist, since it does not oppose democratic politics and does not have a direct connection to older fascist groups, but that they are xenophobes and Islamophobes. It has been classified as part of the counter-jihad movement, although it is considered a more radical part.

Britain First's founding principles stated that its aim is to protect "British and Christian morality", it is "committed to preserving our cultural heritage" and "We oppose the increasing colonisation of our homeland through uncontrolled, mass immigration. Britain First is committed to maintaining and strengthening Christianity as the foundation of our society and culture" and that "Genuine British citizens will be put first in housing, jobs, education, welfare and health". The party self-styles itself as "loyalist".

Paul Golding disputes interpretations that Jesus was pacifistic or liberal, justifying his belief by citing Jesus' apparent violence against the money lenders and his statement that he came to bring a sword rather than peace. Every major Christian denomination in the UK has denounced Britain First, along with Christian denominations across the UK condemning the group as blasphemous to Christian teachings.

It also campaigns against Islamism, immigration and abortion. Britain First states that it is not opposed to individual Muslims, but is against the doctrine and religion of Islam itself, which they describe as "barbaric". It said in 2015 that Muslims are the only community not integrating, and that "Jews don't cause any problems".

Its claimed objective is "to save this country and our people from the EU, politically correct, multicultural insanity that is now engulfing us". The group opposes the European Union, saying it is a socialist threat to individual national identities. Britain First states that it has thousands of members who belong to ethnic minorities, and the group rejects the term racism as the "[invention of] a communist mass murderer to silence European opposition to 'multiculturalism'".

== Public profile and controversies ==
=== Ideology ===
A number of sources have criticised Britain First on various grounds. Some sources have noted the openly militaristic and violent nature of the group, particularly in recruiting and training ex-soldiers, and unlawfully wearing political uniforms. Members of the group, including its founder Jim Dowson, have stated their desire for a religious war in the UK.

A 2014 report on the links between Britain First and terrorist organisations in Northern Ireland said that behind populist Facebook posts "lies a small but dangerous group of religious fundamentalists intent on starting a 'Holy war'".

In 2014, Britain First began holding "Christian patrols", ostensibly in retaliation for the Muslim patrol incidents that began the year before. In 2016, after the group held one of its Christian patrols in a primarily Muslim area of Luton, all major Christian denominations and organisations in the UK denounced Britain First and its ideology. The group was accused of "hi-jacking the name of Jesus Christ to justify hatred and spread fear". In the same year, a petition to the Home Office was launched urging a ban on the group.

=== Misleading media ===
Britain First has also attracted derision and condemnation for social media posts. These included a post which falsely labelled Afghanistan's first female police officer, who was murdered by the Taliban, as a terrorist, and posts falsely linking the burqa and terrorism. In March 2015, an American veteran stated his intention to sue for libel after the group shared a 'photoshopped' image of him. In the original image, the veteran was holding a sign reading "Boycott bigotry"; in the version shared by Britain First the sign reads, "Boycott bigotry and kill all non-Muslims". Britain First also received criticism for posing for a photograph with naval cadets in Nottingham, and then adding a caption falsely claiming that their activists were protecting the children.

In addition to this, Britain First publishes media falsely labelling Muslims, who happened to be protesting against Islamophobia and bigotry, celebrating cricket results, or not even there, as "extremists".

Furthermore, Britain First's Facebook page has attracted the attention of news outlets because of its misleading and inciteful content relating to Muslims. According to The Guardian, "[T]hey included one comparing Muslim immigrants to animals, another labelling the group's leaders 'Islamophobic and proud', and videos created to incite hateful comments against Muslims."

=== Merchandise issues ===
In August 2014, the Cabinet Office wrote to Britain First requesting that they remove an image of the British crown from their merchandise. The Advertising Standards Authority (ASA) had previously requested that the crown be removed from Britain First's online accounts. In response, Golding called the ASA a "toothless quango with no power which no one takes any notice of" and responded that the group's solicitors had deemed the crown distinct enough to be used without breaching regulations. The ASA published a ruling on 4 March 2015 upholding complaints about Britain First's use of the crown symbol, and about their selling merchandise falsely implying that it was British-made.

In January 2026, The Independent reported that both Advance UK and Britain First were selling official merchandise manufactured in China and Pakistan.

=== Religiously aggravated harassment ===
In May 2017, Golding and Fransen were charged with religiously aggravated harassment over verbal attacks and leaflets they distributed in Thanet and Canterbury. They pleaded not guilty at a hearing on 17 October 2017; a "Persecuted Patriots Rally" organised on 4 November to show support attracted more opponents than supporters. At Folkestone Magistrates' Court on 7 March 2018, Fransen was found guilty on three counts and Golding on one. They were jailed for 36 weeks and 18 weeks respectively.

=== Posts retweeted by Donald Trump ===
In November 2017, the President of the United States, Donald Trump, caused controversy by re-tweeting three anti-Muslim videos shared by Jayda Fransen. The re-tweets were responded to by Fransen and Paul Golding with the statement "God Bless you Trump! God Bless America!". Britain First boasted of a surge in support after Trump retweeted its videos.

The three Islamophobic videos tweeted by Fransen were inflammatory and unverified: Britain First has a history of sharing misleading videos. One video falsely claimed to show a Muslim migrant beating up a boy on crutches. A video ("Muslim Destroys a Statue of Virgin Mary!") was filmed during the Syrian Civil War in 2013 and showed a man, who is believed to be an Al-Nusra supporter, destroying a statue of Mary and stating, "No-one but Allah will be worshipped in the land of the Levant." The third video ("Islamist mob pushes teenage boy off roof and beats him to death!") contained footage from Alexandria, Egypt, during a period of violent unrest following the overthrow in 2013 of that country's president Mohamed Morsi.

Trump's retweeting was condemned by Labour leader Jeremy Corbyn; Labour MPs Chuka Umunna, David Lammy, and Yvette Cooper; Brendan Cox, the husband of murdered MP Jo Cox; journalist Piers Morgan; Unite Against Fascism; and the Council on American–Islamic Relations. The incident resulted in calls for Trump to be banned from the UK; Jo Cox's successor in Parliament, Tracy Brabin, said he would not be welcome. A spokesman for the Prime Minister, Theresa May, condemned Trump's retweeting and added that Britain First spread "hateful narratives which peddle lies and stoke tensions". Justin Welby, the Archbishop of Canterbury, also condemned Trump's retweets, writing on social media that, "Britain First seeks to divide communities and intimidate minorities, especially our Muslim friends and neighbours. Britain First does not share our values of tolerance and solidarity. God calls us as Christians to love our neighbour and seek the flourishing of all in our communities, societies and nations. I join the urgent call of faith groups and others for President Trump not just to remove these tweets, but to make clear his opposition to racism and hatred in all forms."

Three weeks later, on 18 December, Twitter suspended the accounts of Golding, Fransen, and Britain First. They later joined and ask all their followers to go to the Gab social networking service created as an alternative to social networks like Facebook, Twitter and Reddit.

During a January 2018 interview with Piers Morgan for Good Morning Britain, Trump said he was not familiar with Britain First when he retweeted them, saying, "If you are telling me they're horrible people, horrible, racist people, I would certainly apologise if you'd like me to do that."

In 2023, Golding and Britain First were unblocked on Twitter.

=== 2017 conference ===
Britain First's 2017 conference in Bedfordshire, held at the beginning of December, was booked under a different name. The venue said it would not have taken the booking from Britain First if it had known who was behind it "as the values of our organisation conflicts with theirs in totality"; the booking fee was donated to charity. One of the invited speakers at the conference was Jolene Bunting, an independent unionist city councillor in Belfast. Bunting had previously organised an anti-terrorist rally in front of Belfast City Hall in August 2017, with invited speakers including Golding and Fransen. Fransen was subsequently arrested in London in November 2017 by detectives from the Police Service of Northern Ireland, charged with using "threatening, abusive or insulting words or behaviour" at the rally, and ordered to appear at Belfast Magistrates' Court on 14 December 2017. On that day, both she and Golding were re-arrested in Belfast. A small "Free speech for Jayda" demonstration took place outside the courts.

=== Finsbury Park terrorist attack ===
On 19 June 2017, a van was driven into pedestrians in Finsbury Park, London, near Finsbury Park Mosque, injuring at least eight people. On 23 January 2018, it was alleged that the perpetrator of the Finsbury Park attack, Darren Osborne, had had contact with far-right groups including Britain First. After the London Bridge attack on 3 June, he made several searches on Google for Britain First leader Paul Golding and his deputy Jayda Fransen, as well as Tommy Robinson, one of the EDL's founders. He also received a direct Twitter message from Fransen.

=== Facebook account ===
In March 2018, Facebook removed the accounts of Golding, Fransen and Britain First, on the grounds that they had repeatedly violated its community standards. Facebook said that the group had "repeatedly posted content designed to incite animosity and hatred against minority groups, which disqualifies the pages from our services". Part of Facebook's community guidelines includes a ban on homophobic and transphobic hate speech, of which Britain First's page was accused of having "lashed out at LGBT equality, attacking [a] reality dating show for featuring a lesbian couple last year and repeatedly lashing out at transgender rights" in an article by PinkNews in March 2018. At the time, more than two million people had "liked" the group's Facebook page. The British Prime Minister, Theresa May, and the mayor of London, Sadiq Khan, both welcomed the move. The group was also banned from setting up an official Facebook page in the future. Matthew Collins, head of research for the anti-fascist group Hope not Hate, suggested in The Guardian that the ban, combined with the imprisonment of the party's leaders, has the potential to lead to the collapse of Britain First, which has depended heavily on online activism.

In July 2018, the documentary programme Dispatches reported that prior to being taken down, Britain First's Facebook page had been one of several far-right pages specially protected by Facebook. According to a moderator, the page was protected because its popularity provided Facebook with a lot of advertising revenue. Britain First's page had broken Facebook's rules more than the number of times that would normally lead to the page being banned from the site. Facebook disputed that it shielded pages based on popularity.

=== Murder of Jo Cox and possible proscription ===
On 16 June 2016, Jo Cox MP was fatally shot and stabbed outside a library in Birstall, by a man who eyewitnesses said shouted "Britain first" as he carried out the attack. One witness told BBC News that he was uncertain whether the suspect was shouting "Britain first" or "put Britain first". Another man said that he did not hear the words at all. The party issued a statement denying any involvement or encouragement in the attack and suggested that the phrase "could have been a slogan rather than a reference to our party". The group's leader, Paul Golding, condemned the attack, saying, "We hope that this person who carried it out is strung up by the neck on the nearest lamp post. That's the way we view justice."

Following this, the far-right organisation National Action (which lauded Cox's murderer) became the first far-right group to be proscribed as a terrorist organisation in December 2016. In November, several months after Cox's murder, the Labour MP Louise Haigh said that the House of Commons should open a debate on the issue of Britain First's proscription, saying to The Independent that "the threat and violence of the extremist political right is of serious concern", adding that "we need a full and frank debate in this country about how such hate-filled, violent extreme right organisations are threatening and undermining the values we hold dear". Following this debate, Haigh received a number of death threats, saying that on one day "an individual went through every one of my YouTube videos and said he would not rest until I was murdered. If that is not evidence that Britain First should be proscribed as a terrorist organisation, I am not sure what is".

=== Electoral offences ===
In July 2019, the Electoral Commission announced that Britain First had been fined £44,200 following an investigation that identified a series of offences against electoral registration regulations, including failing to keep accurate financial records of transactions in 2016, failing to file any quarterly donation reports in 2016 (with £200,000 of undeclared donations), not having its 2016 accounts professionally audited and failing to provide information sought by the commission.

== See also ==
- Pegida UK
- English Defence League
- Far-right politics in the United Kingdom
