= Belfast City Hall flag protests =

Protests in Northern Ireland

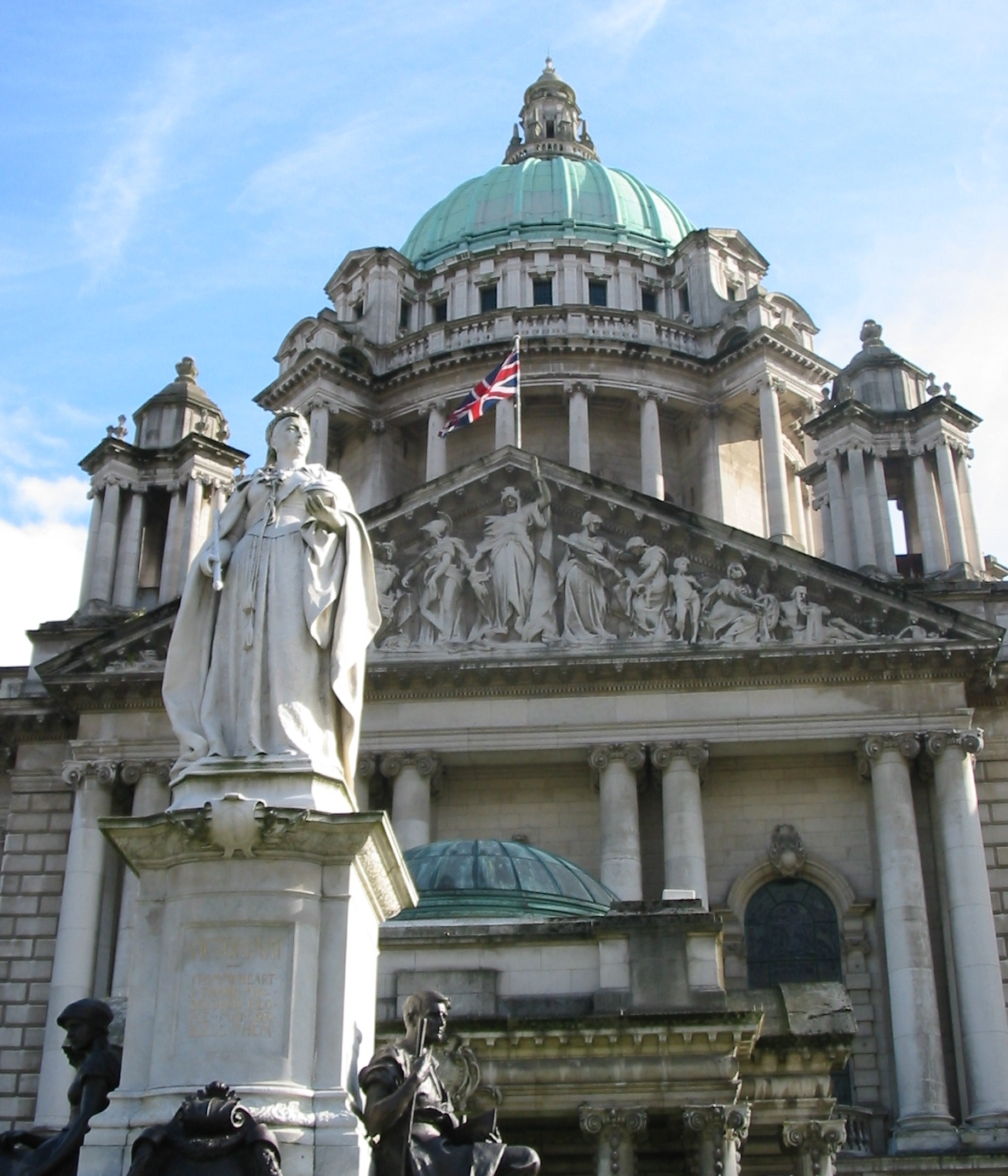
- The Union Flag flying atop Belfast City Hall in 2006
- Date: 3 December 2012 – December 2013
- Location: Northern Ireland
- Caused by: Belfast City Council voting to limit the days that the Union Flag flies from City Hall
- Methods: Street protests, riots
- Status: Minor sporadic protests where issue is sporadically part of the protest causes

Parties
Police Service of Northern Ireland	Ulster loyalists (including members of the Ulster Volunteer Force and Ulster Defence Association) and British nationalists

Lead figures
David Ford (Justice Minister); Gavin Robinson (Lord Mayor of Belfast)	Willie Frazer; Jamie Bryson; Jim Allister

Casualties and losses
157 police officers injured	560 charged

On 3 December 2012, Belfast City Council voted to limit the days that the Union Flag (the flag of the United Kingdom) flies from Belfast City Hall. Since 1906, the flag had been flown every day of the year. This was reduced to 18 specific days a year, the minimum requirement for UK government buildings. The move to limit the number of days was backed by the council's Irish nationalists while the Alliance Party abstained from the vote; it was opposed by the unionist councillors.

As a response, Ulster loyalists and British nationalists held street protests throughout Northern Ireland. They saw the council's decision as part of a wider 'cultural war' against 'Britishness' in Northern Ireland. On the night of the vote, protesters tried to storm City Hall. Throughout December and January, protests were held almost daily and most involved the protesters blocking roads while carrying Union Flags and banners. Some of these protests led to clashes between loyalists and the police, sparking riots. Rioters attacked police with petrol bombs, bricks, stones and fireworks; police responded with plastic bullets and water cannon. Alliance Party offices and the homes of Alliance Party members were attacked, while Belfast City Councillors were sent death threats. According to police, some of the violence was orchestrated by high-ranking members of the Ulster Volunteer Force (UVF) and Ulster Defence Association (UDA). Loyalists also put up thousands of Union flags in public places, which further heightened tension.

After February 2013, the protests have been smaller and less frequent, and have led to greater loyalist protests about related issues, such as restrictions on traditional loyalist marches.

== Background ==
Since the formation of Northern Ireland in 1921, there has been tension and violence between its two main religious groups. Unionists/Ulster loyalists (who are mostly Ulster Protestant) generally want Northern Ireland to remain within the United Kingdom, while Irish nationalists/republicans (who are mostly Catholic) generally want it to leave the United Kingdom and join a united Ireland. The former generally identify with the Union Flag, while the latter generally do not and instead identify with the Irish tricolour.

In Northern Ireland, flags are often used as symbols of political allegiance, cultural identity, and to mark territory. The flying of flags is an issue in Northern Ireland, and flying certain flags in certain places can be highly controversial. There have been many protests and clashes involving flags and symbols over the years. In 1964 there were riots after a republican election candidate put an Irish tricolour (which was then illegal) in the window of his office on the Falls Road, Belfast. The unionist Minister of Home Affairs, responding to pressure from hardliners, ordered police to remove the flag. This sparked fierce clashes between republicans and the police.

Belfast City Council had long been dominated by unionists, mainly the Democratic Unionist Party (DUP) and Ulster Unionist Party (UUP). However, in May 2011 Irish nationalists (Sinn Féin and the Social Democratic and Labour Party) won more seats than unionists for the first time. The middle-ground Alliance Party held the balance of power on the council. Nationalist councillors wanted the Union Jack taken down permanently, and unionist councillors wanted it to keep flying all year. Alliance put forward a compromise: that it would fly on 18 designated days, in line with UK government policy on the flying of the union flag from UK government buildings, which is followed by many city and local governments in Britain. At Parliament Buildings (or Stormont), where the Northern Ireland Assembly meets, the Union Jack is only flown on 15 designated days. The nationalist and Alliance councillors voted in favour of this compromise and it was passed.

In the weeks leading up to the vote, the DUP had printed and distributed over 40,000 leaflets in East Belfast, with help from the UUP. The leaflets attacked Alliance and called on people to protest against its proposal. Alliance accused the unionists of trying to raise tensions. In the May 2010 general election, Naomi Long of Alliance had defeated Peter Robinson of the DUP to win the East Belfast seat. This was the first time that a non-unionist party had won the seat. It is thought that many unionists voted for Alliance as a protest at Robinson's financial misdealings. Some commentators believed that the DUP had been waiting for a chance to weaken the Alliance Party and win back their former voters in East Belfast.

During the middle of 2012, particularly in September, heightened tensions led to the 2012 North Belfast riots.

== Protests ==
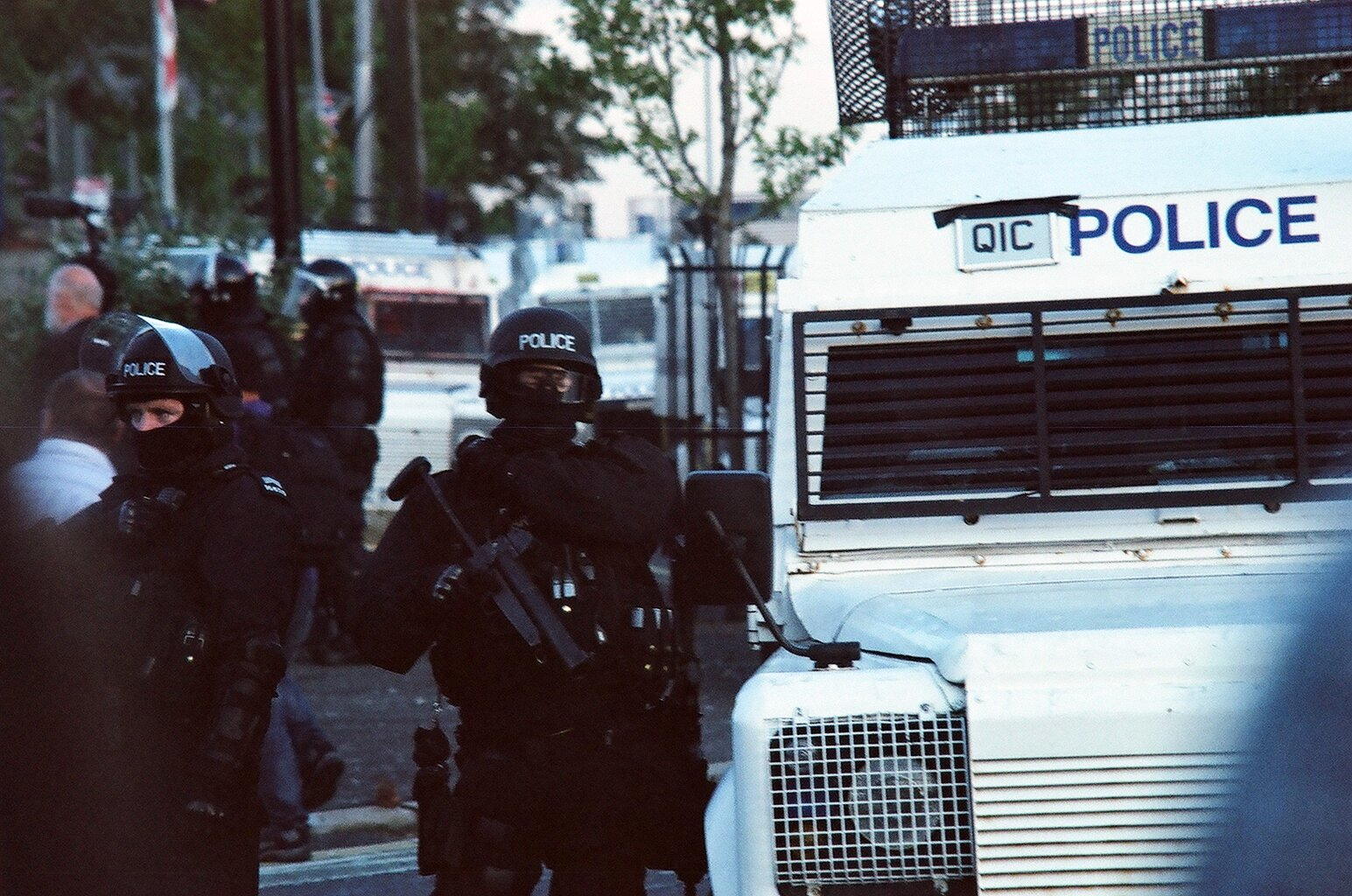
PSNI riot police in Belfast

The unionist protesters saw the change as an attack on their cultural identity. In December 2012 and early 2013 they held almost daily street protests throughout Northern Ireland. Most involved the protesters blocking roads while carrying Union Flags and banners. Some of these protests led to clashes between protesters and the Police Service of Northern Ireland (PSNI), sparking riots. Attacks were made on Alliance Party offices and the homes of Alliance Party members, while Belfast City councillors were sent death threats. Unlike the Irish nationalist parties, Alliance has offices in loyalist areas. According to police, some of the violence has been orchestrated by high-ranking members of the Ulster Volunteer Force (UVF) and Ulster Defence Association (UDA). These are the two main loyalist paramilitary groups, who waged armed campaigns during the Troubles but declared ceasefires in 1994. The Belfast Telegraph claimed that some of the violence has been fuelled by youngsters engaging in "recreational rioting". There was also a rise in sectarian attacks on Catholic churches by loyalist militants, which some have linked to the flag protests.

The cost of policing the protests has been estimated at £20 million (up to 7 March 2013).

=== December 2012 ===
On the evening of 3 December, hundreds of protesters gathered outside City Hall as the debate and vote was being held. Minutes after the vote, protesters broke into the back courtyard and tried to force open the doors of the building. Two security staff and a press photographer were injured, and windows of cars in the courtyard were smashed. Protesters then clashed with the police, injuring 15 officers. The Chief Superintendent said:

Clearly there was a level of orchestration – some people brought bolt cutters, others put on masks immediately after the vote came through

On 4 December, Alliance Party councillor Laura McNamee was forced to move from her east Belfast home after receiving threats. On 5 December, up to 1,500 protesters gathered in Carrickfergus. The protest became violent and police responded by firing plastic bullets. The rioters ransacked an Alliance Party office and tried to set it on fire. The home of Michael and Christine Bower, Alliance councillors in Bangor, was attacked.

There were clashes between protesters and police in Belfast and Newtownabbey on 7 December; police responded with water cannons. Death threats were sent to Naomi Long, Alliance's MP for East Belfast in the House of Commons. She described it as a "wanton attack on the democratic process". Bullets were sent to her, David Ford, local councillor Gerardine Mulvenna, Gerry Kelly and Alex Maskey. The home and car of an Alliance councillor in Newtownards were attacked, with most of the windows being smashed. Speaking on a radio show that morning, Ulster Unionist Party (UUP) politician Basil McCrea went against his party's policy and said he agreed with the flag vote. Other party members demanded the party take action against him.

Up to 2,000 protesters gathered at Belfast City Hall on 8 December. The crowd was addressed by former British National Party (BNP) fundraiser Jim Dowson. Also present were Progressive Unionist Party (PUP) leader Billy Hutchinson and Ulster Defence Association (UDA) commander Jackie McDonald. Some of the protesters burnt an Irish tricolour. There were minor clashes with police after the rally.

On 10 December, a gang of men attacked a police car guarding Naomi Long's office in east Belfast. They smashed the window and threw in a petrol bomb while a policewoman was still inside, but she escaped unharmed. There was rioting in east and south Belfast. In Armagh, protesters attacked a pub owned by the husband of a Sinn Féin councillor. The windows were smashed and rocket fireworks thrown inside. Later, three men were hurt in a hit-and-run at a protest nearby.

There were two large demonstrations at City Hall on 15 December. In response to the violence, several hundred held a "peace vigil" in which they linked arms and encircled the building. Later, up to 1,000 loyalists with Union Flags blocked the roads in front of the building. About 80 protests were held in Northern Ireland on 17 December. Police were attacked in south Belfast, where loyalists blocked a road near the City Hospital with a burning barricade and tried to hijack vehicles. At a protest in Portadown, a man was hurt in a road accident. At Carrickfergus Town Hall, protesters disrupted a meeting of the council and threatened councillors. Alliance councillor Noel Williams called it "a full frontal attack on democracy".

=== January 2013 ===
==== 1–15 January ====
Each night from 3–8 January, the protests led to clashes between loyalists and police in East Belfast. Rioters threw petrol bombs, fireworks, bricks, stones and bottles; police responded with plastic bullets and water cannon. According to the Belfast Telegraph, much of the East Belfast violence was being directed by a few high-ranking members of the UVF East Belfast Brigade. They allegedly ignored orders from the UVF leadership to stop the violence. Police sources said that the East Belfast Brigade leader could have stopped the rioting if he wished. Ten officers were injured on the first night. On 4 January, attempts were made to hijack cars and buses. In Newtownabbey, masked men broke into commercial premises and stole money. On 5 January, shots were fired at police during clashes in east Belfast. Loyalists claimed that trouble began when they came under attack from the Short Strand, an Irish nationalist enclave. The next night, loyalists protested near the Short Strand and then clashed with police nearby.

On 7 January, Belfast City Council met for the first time since the vote was passed. The PSNI closed roads around City Hall while loyalists protested outside. The protesters called for the decision to be reversed. About 400 people had gathered near the city hall for a peaceful protest for the first time since the vote as a result of a call through social media. As protesters passed the Short Strand on their return to East Belfast, clashes again broke out between the protesters and nationalist residents. When police tried to disperse the crowds, they were attacked with petrol bombs, fireworks, bricks and bottles. Officers and their vehicles were also attacked with hatchets and sledge hammers. They responded with plastic bullets and water cannon. On 9 January, the Union Jack was raised at the city hall for the first time since the vote in commemoration of Kate Middleton's birthday. The first meeting of the 'Unionist Forum' took place on 10 January. It was set up by the DUP and UUP to address the flag protests and other concerns among unionists.

On 11 January, protesters blocked roads in Belfast, Bangor, Newtownards, Dundonald and Clough. There was rioting in Newtownabbey and Carrickfergus. Petrol bombs, fireworks and stones were thrown at police, who responded with plastic bullets and water cannons; four PSNI officers were injured as a result of the rioting. A press photographer who was covering the riot in Newtownabbey was robbed at knifepoint, while a bus was set alight in the same area and a car was hijacked in north Belfast. Translink suspended almost all its bus services in Belfast. There were also protests in Glasgow and Liverpool.

On 12 January 1,000 loyalists gathered at City Hall carrying Union Jacks and "No Surrender" banners. As protesters marched back to East Belfast, police tried to divert them away from Short Strand. However, "the vast majority" took an unapproved route and some then donned masks and attacked police. As they passed Short Strand, there were clashes between the loyalists and nationalists and bricks were thrown at houses. Police came under "heavy and sustained" attack after moving in to deal with the rioters; 29 officers were injured. Officers responded with plastic bullets and water cannon. Sinn Féin's Short Strand councillor Niall Ó Donnghaile said that this was the 15th illegal loyalist march past Short Strand that month alone.

The next day over 1,000 people held another "peace rally" outside City Hall. The protesters clapped, cheered, whistled, and banged drums for five minutes as a show of "anti-silence", saying that it represents "the silent majority" opposed to the violence. Later, about 200 loyalists blocked Albertbridge Road and Castlereagh Street, while a line of riot police separated them from a crowd that had gathered at Short Strand. Some missiles were thrown but there was no serious trouble.

The rioting of 14 January began when masked loyalist protesters petrol bombed Catholic homes around St Matthew's Church, at the edge of Short Strand. Jim Wilson, a loyalist community worker, confirmed that youths from his community had started the violence. Niall Ó Donnghaile called it a "blatant, well planned and organised sectarian attack ... It is an attempt by unionists to intimidate a small Catholic community". St Matthew's church hall was hosting a social event for children with special needs, but had to be evacuated. Wilson said a crowd of nationalists arrived after the first missiles were thrown and some attacked Protestant homes in retaliation. When police arrived, the loyalists threw dozens of petrol bombs at police jeeps, three of which caught fire. A bus driver was also hurt when his vehicle was stoned.

==== 16–31 January ====
On 17 January, leaflets were distributed to homes in East Belfast, where much of the rioting had taken place, calling for the violence to end. The move was backed by church groups, community groups, and loyalist paramilitary groups; including the UVF, UDA, and Red Hand Commando (RHC).

On 18 January, protesters pelted police at a protest in Ballyclare, leading to two arrests.

On 19 January, several hundred loyalists attended the weekly Saturday protest at Belfast City Hall. There was no trouble as they passed the nationalist Short Strand, but later three people were arrested and two charged with disorderly behaviour following trouble in the Albertbridge Road area.

On 20 January, about 150 loyalists held a protest in Derry outside a concert featuring Derry singers Nadine Coyle and Phil Coulter to mark the start of Derry's year as the 2013 UK City of Culture. Police largely contained the protest, but about 30 people got onto the road for a short time and blocked traffic. Two people were arrested, although the concert suffered no disruption. The following day, 11 arrests were made during flag protests across Northern Ireland. Three were arrested in Derry's Waterside area for offences including disorderly behaviour and obstructing a highway. The other eight arrests were in East Belfast on suspicion of blocking a highway.

In Newtownabbey on 25 January, loyalists threw petrol bombs, stones and fireworks at police following a flag protest there. A batch of petrol bombs was seized by police. Elsewhere in Northern Ireland, a demonstration which applied to the Parades Commission took place in Castlederg, where 350 people and six bands attended. In Belfast, several roads were blocked by protesters.

On 26 January, several hundred loyalists held a protest outside Belfast City Hall, and a number of protesters later blocked several roads in East Belfast. A man was later arrested and charged with assaulting police, disorderly behaviour, obstructing traffic and resisting arrest. First Minister Peter Robinson attended a meeting with loyalist leaders as well as local church and community representatives at the Skainos Centre in East Belfast. When leaving, he was heckled by a small crowd of loyalists and his car was struck by a flag pole.

On 27 January, several hundred loyalists held a peaceful protest in Derry's Waterside area, with Willie Frazer of Families Acting for Innocent Relatives (FAIR) and Henry Reilly of UKIP in attendance.

=== February 2013 ===
On 16 February, an IFA Premiership match at Seaview between Crusaders and Cliftonville was called off due to a loyalist protest outside the stadium.

On 27 February, prominent loyalist activist Willie Frazer and flag protest organiser Jamie Bryson were arrested by the PSNI as part of their investigation into the flag protests. On 1 March, Jim Dowson was also arrested for his role in the protests. He was later released on bail.

=== March 2013 ===
On 2 March, 150 loyalists turned up for the weekly protest outside Belfast City Hall. However, unlike previous demonstrations, protesters were bussed to City Hall rather than marching. PSNI assistant police constable Will Kerr said this represented a "sea change".

On 4 March, loyalist protesters, angered by the arrest of loyalist activist Willie Frazer, interrupted a meeting of the Northern Ireland Assembly.

There was a further riot in Newtownabbey on 8 March, when up to 100 flag protesters attacked police with bricks and bottles. A car was also burnt and the office of Alliance leader David Ford was attacked. Five police officers were injured.

On 14 March, a small loyalist protest was held outside a new leisure centre in Bangor as it was being visited by Sinn Féin's Carál Ní Chuilín. The same day, a man was charged with sending three hoax bomb warnings by detectives investigating offences linked to the flag protests.

On 17 March, Saint Patrick's Day, a PSNI officer was injured during rioting in South Belfast. The riot reportedly started when loyalists tried to hold a protest outside pubs in Shaftesbury Square, but were pushed back to Donegall Road by police. Masked loyalists burnt bins on the road and attacked police with bricks and bottles. The following day, a St Patrick's Day parade in Omagh was re-routed after "a huge number" of Union Flags were put up along part of the planned route. Irish nationalist councillors said the flags undermined the plan for a neutral and inclusive parade.

=== April 2013 ===
On 20 April, Belfast City Council rejected a DUP proposal to fly the Union Flag every day on the Belfast Cenotaph in the grounds of City Hall. Unionist councillors voted in favour of the proposal but Irish nationalist and Alliance councillors voted against it. The Royal British Legion was also against the proposal, saying it did not want the cenotaph to become politicized.

On 24 April, Willie Frazer and Jim Dowson launched a new unionist party known as the Protestant Coalition at the La Mon Hotel near Belfast.

=== May 2013 ===
On 1 May, the DUP officially abandoned its campaign to have the Union Flag flown every day on the cenotaph of Belfast City Hall. A small group of loyalist protesters gathered outside City Hall but there was no trouble. A few days later, the DUP's Sammy Wilson—Northern Ireland's Minister of Finance—ordered that the Union Flag be flown from all government buildings run by the Department of Finance. The move could cost up to £10,000 and was criticized by Sinn Féin, the SDLP and the Alliance Party.

=== June 2013 ===
On 13 June, lawyers of a nationalist resident in East Belfast informed the High Court that the PSNI allowed loyalist protesters to stage illegal marches through Belfast City Centre for up to three months, and that all those involved in the marches should have been arrested.

On 15 June, around 100 loyalists held the now-weekly loyalist flag protest outside Belfast City Hall, which coincided with a large anti-G8 march taking place in the city centre. According to the PUP's Billy Hutchinson, some loyalist protesters felt that the G8 rally was "anti British". Many loyalists booed and jeered whilst speeches were made during the anti-G8 rally.

On 24 June, Belfast City Council voted to raise the armed forces flag on Belfast City Hall for six days after a request from the Ministry of Defence. The Alliance Party and unionist parties voted in favour of the motion, whilst nationalist parties such as Sinn Féin voted against the issue.

=== August 2013 ===
On 6 August, the Lord Mayor of Belfast, Sinn Féin councillor Máirtín Ó Muilleoir was attacked by a large crowd of loyalists during the reopening of Woodvale Park, forcing the event to be abandoned. The mayor had to be escorted from the park by police and the crowd jostled and heckled him whilst throwing missiles at police. He was taken to the Royal Victoria Hospital for a check-up following the incident. Nine PSNI officers were injured.

=== September 2013 ===
On 21 September, in one of the largest Union Flag protests seen in Belfast since January, more than 3,000 loyalists took part in a march organised by Loyalist Peaceful Protesters. 1,000 loyalists initially gathered at Belfast City Hall, but the march began later than agreed and was thus in breach of a Parades Commission ruling. The number of loyalists in the march grew from 1,000 to 3,000 as it passed through the strongly loyalist Shankill Road area of West Belfast before ending in the Woodvale area of North Belfast. The parade passed off with no incidents.

=== October 2013 ===
On 12 October, Irish News editor Noel Doran addressed the PUP annual conference, telling the conference that loyalists had "got it wrong" over the flag protests, and that what they were opposing was a democratic decision. He also said that loyalists could learn from organisations like the Gaelic Athletic Association when it came to issues like community pride and reaching out.

On 14 October, First Minister Peter Robinson urged loyalists planning large demonstrations leading up to the Christmas period to think about the possible consequences protests would have on business and jobs.

=== November 2013 ===
On 17 November, an Alliance Party office in East Belfast was petrol bombed by loyalists. The Alliance Party's East Belfast MP Naomi Long condemned the attack as "an attack on democracy".

On 30 November, 1,500 loyalists marched in the city centre to mark one year since Belfast City Council's vote on the Union Flag. The march broke a Parades Commission ruling that it had to leave the city centre by 12:30pm. The march was mostly peaceful, but two PSNI officers were hurt and a man was arrested during scuffles at Crumlin Road.

== Reactions ==
Prime Minister of the United Kingdom David Cameron condemned the protests, saying "violence is absolutely unjustified in those and in other circumstances." MP Naomi Long said that Northern Ireland is facing "an incredibly volatile and extremely serious situation". She also called on Cameron to intervene after a police car outside her office was firebombed with a policewoman escaping injury in early December. On 13 January, she said that the party had no regrets in its decision to limit the days the Union Jack would fly over the city hall. First Minister Peter Robinson said on 13 January that the political process was the only way forward in developing cordial relations. "We took some difficult decisions, some might say historic decisions to build a shared society in Northern Ireland. I think it is important to tell the wider community in Northern Ireland and our friends in the rest of the United Kingdom that we are not giving up on that. We are very much of the view that we are determined that we build the kind of society where everybody can have a peaceful and stable existence." He and Deputy First Minister Martin McGuinness were due to meet the British and Irish governments the following week and that Robinson would make it "very clear" about the condemnation of the wider Northern Ireland community for the violence. Robinson added that Northern Ireland's international image was getting damaged by the violence.

In early January 2013, Willie Frazer said that he and a group of loyalists planned to hold a protest outside the Irish parliament building, Leinster House, in Dublin and "sarcastically" ask for the Irish flag to be taken down. Frazer said "it's a tongue-in-cheek gesture. It's to give Irish people a sense of how we feel. I would be very offended if I was living in Ireland and someone came and asked me to take the flag down. That's exactly how we feel in Belfast. People keep telling us we're still part of the UK, yet here we are without a flag". In 2006, a march in Dublin, organised by Love Ulster, had sparked riots. The Progressive Unionist Party's Billy Hutchinson condemned the clashes, while his colleague, Phil Hamilton, criticised the PSNI for not deploying enough officers to the Short Strand area on 12 January to prevent violence. The UDA's Jimmy Birch told the BBC's Radio Ulster: "Every time they call a tune, we take to the streets. We are wrecking our own areas, we fight with the police, we are burning our own cars and we stop our own people going to work and disrupt our own people's way of life. It is wrong, we need to step back and we need to stop being predictable."

The PSNI's Chief Constable Matt Baggott blamed the violence on the UVF for "orchestrating violence for their own selfish motives. Everyone involved needs to step back. The lack of control is very worrying. The only answer is a political solution. [Otherwise this] will eat into our ability to deal with drugs, into our ability to deal with alcohol issues, and deal with what is a very severe dissident threat."

United States Secretary of State Hillary Clinton called for an end to the protests during a trip to Belfast on 7 December.

In September 2013, business representatives in Belfast revealed that the flag protests had resulted in losses totaling £50 million in the year to July 2013.

== See also ==
- List of protests in the 21st century

Other major loyalist protests

- Ulster Workers' Council strike (1974)
- Ulster Says No (1980s)
- Holy Cross dispute (2001)
- 2005 Belfast riots
- 2013 Belfast riots
