= AFP =

AFP most often refers to:

- Agence France-Presse, an international news agency
- Australian Federal Police

AFP or afp may also refer to:

== Media ==
=== Publications ===
- American Free Press, a weekly newspaper
- American Family Physician, a peer-reviewed journal of the American Academy of Family Physicians
- Archive of Formal Proofs, a mathematics journal
- Australian Family Physician, a peer-reviewed journal of the Royal Australian College of General Practitioners

=== Television series ===
- AFP (TV series), a 2011 Australian factual television series
- AFP: American Fighter Pilot, a 2002 American television reality show
- America's Funniest People, a 1990 American television reality show

=== Other uses inmedia ===
- Advertiser-funded programming, a television funding model
- American Family Publishers, a magazine subscription company
- Associação Fonográfica Portuguesa, a recording industry association in Portugal

== Organizations ==
- Armed Forces of the Philippines
- Association for Financial Professionals
- Asia Federation of Pickleball
- Australian Federal Police

== Politics ==
- Alliance of the Forces of Progress (Senegal), a social-democratic political party in Senegal
- America First Party (disambiguation)
  - America First Party (1944), an isolationist political party in 1944, renamed the Christian Nationalist Crusade in 1947
  - America First Party, another name for the Populist Party (United States, 1984) (1984–1996)
- Americans for Prosperity, a Washington, D.C.–based political advocacy group, one of the most influential conservative organizations in the U.S.
- Anarchist Federation of Poland, an anarcho-syndicalist organization that operated in Poland from 1926 to 1939
- Australia First Party, a far-right political party in Australia
- Australian Federation Party, an Australian political party
- Australian Family Party, a South Australian political party

== Science and medicine ==
- Acute flaccid paralysis, a clinical manifestation characterized by paralysis and reduced muscle tone
- Alpha-fetoprotein, a molecule produced in the developing embryo and fetus
- Amplifying fluorescent polymer, a trace explosives detection technology
- Antifreeze protein, a class of proteins that protect from ice damage in certain vertebrates, plants, fungi, and bacteria
- Antifungal protein, a family of proteins with fungicidal activity
- Archive of Formal Proofs, a mathematics journal
- Atypical facial pain

== Technology ==
=== Computing ===
- Advanced Function Presentation
- Apple Filing Protocol, an Apple remote file access protocol
- Advanced Flexible Processor, a CDC Cyber computer system

=== Other uses intechnology ===
- Active fire protection
- Amplifying fluorescent polymer, a trace explosives detection technology
- Artilleriefährprahm, a German gunboat of World War II, a derivative of the Marinefährprahm
- Automated fiber placement, a method of manufacturing with composite materials

== People ==
- A.F.P. Hulsewé (1910–1993), Dutch professor
- Amanda Palmer (born 1976), sometimes known as Amanda Fucking Palmer, a punk cabaret artist in the duo The Dresden Dolls

== Other uses ==
- Administradoras de Fondos de Pensiones, a fully funded capitalization system run by private sector pension funds in Chile; see Pensions in Chile
- Tapei language (ISO 639-3 code: afp)

== See also ==
- American Forces Press Service (AFPS)
