= Jamie Bryson =

Northern Ireland loyalist

Personal details
- Born: 4 January 1990 (age 36) Donaghadee, Northern Ireland
- Party: Independent

Jamie Bryson (born 4 January 1990 in Donaghadee, Northern Ireland) is a Northern Irish loyalist activist who originally attracted media attention as a leading figure in the Belfast City Hall flag protests. He is the author of four books and is the editor of Unionist Voice, a monthly unionist newsletter and online site. He also runs a consultancy business focusing on loyalist public relations, legal work and advocacy.

== Early activities ==
Bryson, an Ulster Protestant from Donaghadee, was born in 1990 to David and Louise Bryson. According to Bryson, he has been "involved in loyalism" since his "school days". He first came to public attention as the vice-chair of the North Down Somme Society, in which role he led complaints that the Royal British Legion (RBL) were excluding the society from participation in Remembrance Day events due to its alleged loyalist paramilitary links. Reportedly, the RBL were so opposed to the North Down Somme Society's involvement it had warned it would "walk away" from events if the group attended. He became a youth cohesion worker, and in December 2010 helped found the Community Partnership political party. He stood for the party in Bangor West at the 2011 Northern Ireland local elections, but took only 167 votes and was not elected.

In 2011, Bryson was active in a campaign against North Down Borough Council's allocation of Peace III funding, through which he met with Martin McGuinness.

Early in 2012, he was convicted of carrying an extendible baton, which he stated was to protect himself from drug dealers angered by his role as a community activist. Later in the year, he published The First Shades of God, a book which argued that churches should adapt to popular culture.

== Belfast City Hall flag protests ==
At the end of 2012 Bryson, serving for a time as chair of the Ulster People's Forum, became a leading figure in the Belfast City Hall flag protests. In December 2012 Belfast City Council voted to limit the number of designated days for flying the Union Jack. Bryson, Jim Dowson and Willie Frazer coordinated a series of street protests against the decision.

He was taken into custody in Bangor on 28 February 2013 for questioning in connection with public order offences. Bryson was one of three protest leaders arrested, the others being Frazer and former British National Party funder Jim Dowson, with Dowson the only one of the three to be granted bail. In protest at this, it was announced Bryson would begin a "hunger and thirst strike", however it was subsequently revealed the strike only lasted a number of hours. In early March Bryson was charged with six matters relating to the protests.

Bryson spent five weeks on remand in HM Prison Maghaberry. Shortly following his arrival he requested to be transferred to the loyalist paramilitary wing where members of the Ulster Volunteer Force (UVF), Ulster Defence Association (UDA) and Red Hand Commando (RHC) (a smaller group tied to the UVF) were held. Bryson told the Sunday Life newspaper that he had requested the transfer because "[he viewed himself] as a loyalist political prisoner". Bryson also said in this time he grew close to UDA prisoner Michael Stone, whom he described as "very smart man". A later report on a separate case by an Independent Press Standards Organisation (IPSO) committee found that the segregated loyalist paramilitary wing of Maghaberry Prison was open only to UVF and UDA members, upon invitation from the UVF or UDA.

In March 2015 Bryson was found guilty of taking part in unlawful public processions and obstructing traffic due to his role in the protests and given a six-month suspended jail sentence.

== UVF criminal probe ==
Bryson has drawn condemnation for various comments made regarding the Ulster Volunteer Force (a paramilitary organisation proscribed as a terror group in the United Kingdom), including claiming that they were "patriots that defended us", that they were not terrorists, and that UVF flags erected in housing estates were "perfectly lawful UVF commemorative flags".

In 2018 Bryson was arrested in relation to a UVF criminality probe. The PSNI sought to impose police bail conditions on him, restricting Bryson from discussing this arrest. Bryson did not comply with the police bail conditions, publishing a video online and giving newspaper interviews arguing that his arrest had nothing to do with any UVF activity, but rather was only in connection with an investigation by a regulatory body in relation to a door supervisory business. The PSNI dropped the conditions less than one week after Bryson's arrest.

As part of the arrest, the PSNI seized materials later claimed in court to have been leaked classified documents relating to the 'On the Run' (OTR) scandal, as well as British Army and RUC files relating to the Kingsmill massacre. The coroner wrote to Bryson demanding these files. Bryson claimed journalistic privilege and refused to hand them over after the court had ordered the PSNI to return them, as regardless of their classified status, they fell into the scope of journalistic material.

In 2018, Bryson launched High Court action against the PSNI and the Security Industry Authority claiming the seizure of material was unlawful and arguing that, because he was a journalist, a different legal processes should have been followed to allow his home to be searched. In May 2019, Bryson succeeded in his judicial review, with the High Court of Northern Ireland declaring the warrants unlawful.

In August 2019 Bryson was questioned by The Nolan Show host Stephen Nolan how he could "be close to [UVF] thinking and know what they're thinking if you're not a spokesperson for them"". Bryson replied "To be a spokesperson for the UVF would be a criminal offence, the UVF are an illegal organisation, the UVF can speak for themselves." In December 2019, following the general election, Bryson was asked by Nolan if given his "connections" to the UVF he was hinting at loyalists in Northern Ireland resorting to violence to obstruct the implementation of the Northern Ireland Protocol. Nolan later asserted on the programme that Bryson had "clear links with the UVF". In March 2022, Nolan introduced Bryson as a "loyalist linked to the East Belfast UVF". Bryson denied he represented the Loyalist Communities Council (LCC), UVF or any other group and stated he only spoke in a personal capacity; Nolan responded that the BBC was "confident" in how it introduced Bryson.

In April 2022 at a rally held in Newbuildings in County Londonderry in opposition to the Northern Ireland Protocol, attended by Democratic Unionist Party (DUP) leader Jeffrey Donaldson and Traditional Unionist Voice (TUV) leader Jim Allister, Bryson warned dissident republicans that any "attack" on his community "would have significant, and ultimately unwanted consequences, but consequences nonetheless". Bryson was responding to a threat against "loyalist leadership figures" issued by dissident group Óglaigh na hÉireann in the wake of recent "UVF and UDA" activity.

Bryson has described life peer Kate Hoey as a "close personal friend." In January 2022 Bryson thanked Hoey and TUV leader Jim Allister for assisting him in a legal challenge to confirm whether the Police Service of Northern Ireland (PSNI) had intelligence linking him to the UVF. The case centred on a PSNI statement in August 2018 when Bryson was arrested in connection with a Security Industry Authority investigation into the illegal supply of pub door staff, which the PSNI said was part of a probe of criminality linked to the East Belfast UVF. He was later released without charge.

== 2014 European election ==
Bryson initially put himself forward for the European elections in 2014 as an independent candidate but failed to raise the funds (£5,000) for the deposit necessary for him to stand.

== Namagate ==
In 2015, Bryson made a number of allegations concerning the sale of loans and properties by the National Asset Management Agency on his blog. This culminated in him giving evidence to the Northern Ireland Assembly's Finance Committee, in which he accused the First Minister of Northern Ireland, Peter Robinson, of corruption.

In August 2016 Bryson was accused of leaking the name of his source in the NAMA revelations, an accusation he strongly denied. The leak of the information regarding Daithí McKay, resulted in the MLA resigning his seat.

Bryson was put on trial on a charge of conspiracy to commit misconduct in public office. He issued a High Court challenge seeking to prevent his prosecution in 2021. His challenge failed in November 2021. He was subsequently cleared of the misconduct charges

== 2024 DUP meeting leaks ==
On 29 January 2024, Bryson again came to prominence when he live-tweeted a private meeting of the DUP party executive. The meeting was called to discuss a proposal to bring the DUP back into power-sharing government and the party had gone to great lengths to ensure that the proceedings remained private. Shortly after the meeting started, Bryson began to share what was being discussed on his X account. The following day it was reported that a senior DUP executive member was wearing a wire which was used to relay the proceedings directly to Bryson. Following the incident, political professor Jonathan Tonge dubbed Bryson "The Man Behind the Wire", a humorous reference to the republican protest song, The Men Behind the Wire.

== Personal life ==
Bryson is an amateur footballer who previously played for East Belfast, before giving up playing to become a manager. As of 2021, he coaches amateur league team Donaghadee.

== Bibliography ==
- Bryson, Jamie (2012). The First Shades of God: One Mans War. CreateSpace Independent Publishing Platform. ISBN 978-1478371809.
- Bryson, Jamie (2012). Four Men Had a Dream: May the Streets Be Broad and Narrow... CreateSpace Independent Publishing Platform. ISBN 978-1478334842.
- Bryson, Jamie (2014). My Only Crime Was Loyalty. CreateSpace Independent Publishing Platform. ISBN 978-1502949158.
- Bryson, Jamie (2021). Brexit Betrayed: Writings from the Referendum to the Betrayal Act. Unionist Voice Publications Ltd. ISBN 979-8588699488.
