= Davy Tweed =

Irish rugby union player and politician (1959–2021)

David Tweed

Member of Ballymena Borough Council
- In office 21 May 1997 – 14 February 2013
- Preceded by: Frederick Coulter
- Succeeded by: Timothy Gaston
- Constituency: Ballymena South

Personal details
- Born: 13 November 1959 Dunloy, County Antrim, Northern Ireland
- Died: 28 October 2021 (aged 61)
- Party: Traditional Unionist Voice (2009–2012); Democratic Unionist Party (1997–2007)
- Other political affiliations: Independent (2012–2013); UUCP (2007–2010)

David Alexander Tweed (13 November 1959 – 28 October 2021) was a Northern Irish unionist politician and Irish rugby union international.

He is alleged to have been a serial child sex offender. In 2012, he was found guilty of child sexual abuse and served four years in prison before that conviction was overturned due to the wording of the direction given to the jury by the trial judge. Tweed's family later accused him of domestic abuse towards his former partner and of sexual abuse of a number of her children and of other children to whom he had access.

After his death he was lauded upon his death as a "larger than life character" by members of the Democratic Unionist Party (DUP) and by Jim Allister, leader of the Traditional Unionist Voice (TUV).

As a politician, Tweed served as a Ballymena Borough Councillor for the Ballymena South DEA from 1997 to 2013.

== Sport ==
Tweed won four caps for the Ireland national rugby union team in the mid-1990s, earning his first in 1995 against France.

== Political career ==
Between 1996 and 1999, Tweed was involved in the Harryville dispute when loyalists picketed a Catholic church in Ballymena. On 8 June 2006, at a Ballymena Borough Council meeting, Tweed said that he "questioned the upbringing" of a 15-year-old Catholic, Michael McIlveen, who had recently been murdered in Ballymena in a sectarian attack. He also claimed people linked to the victim's family had been involved in intimidation of Protestants after the murder.

Tweed was elected as a councillor for the Democratic Unionist Party (DUP) in the Ballymena South electoral district in 1997. He was re-elected for the DUP in 2001 and 2005.

In 2007 Tweed was among six Ballymena DUP councillors who refused to canvass for the party in the Assembly elections because of the DUP's policy of sharing power with Sinn Féin. Tweed attempted to resign in February 2007, Along with five other councillors he subsequently resigned from the party and redesignated themselves as the Ulster Unionist Coalition Party (UUCP).

In 2009, four of the UUCP group left to join Traditional Unionist Voice (TUV), but Tweed remained with the UUCP along with councillor William Wilkinson, head of research for the unionist pressure group Families Acting for Innocent Relatives until the latter's conviction for rape in June 2010. Tweed joined the TUV group on the council in November 2010, and was re-elected in 2011 to Ballymena Borough Council as a TUV candidate.

Tweed was a member of the Orange Order and belonged to a lodge in Dunloy. He was involved in protests relating to the Parades Commission's restrictions on Orange marches in that village.

== Legal issues ==
On 29 October 1997, shortly after his election to Ballymena Council, Tweed was fined at Coleraine magistrates court for assaulting a man in a pub.

On 22 September 2007, Tweed was stopped while driving a car under the influence of alcohol. On 21 January 2008, North Antrim Magistrates Court banned him from driving for a year and imposed a £250 fine.

=== Sexual abuse cases ===
In January 2009, Tweed was charged with ten sex offences against two young girls, spanning an eight-year period; he was acquitted in May 2009.

He was acquitted on 27 November 2012 of one charge of indecent assault on a child.

On 28 November 2012, he was convicted on 13 counts of gross indecency, indecent assault of two young girls and inciting gross indecency, spanning an eight-year period from 1988 onwards. His conviction was quashed on 25 October 2016, due to issues around presentation of evidence of bad character. As he had served almost four years in prison he was not retried. In November 2021 Tweed's stepdaughter Amanda Brown spoke on BBC Radio Ulster TalkBack programme of the sustained sexual abuse she claimed to have suffered at his hands. She questioned the appeal process and explained the reason she was unable to face a further court case. Brown called on the prominent politicians who eulogised him at the time of his death to reconsider their remarks. Her siblings also spoke of their experiences of Tweed's alleged sexual abuse. Victoria and Catherine Alexander Tweed waived their right to anonymity to speak of this abuse.

After this conviction was announced the Orange Order terminated his membership of the organisation. The Royal Black Institution, of which Tweed was also a member, stated it had begun the process of expelling him from its membership. Pending sentencing he remained a member of Ballymena Borough Council and of the TUV, although the party announced on 15 November 2012 that it had 'suspended' his membership "not because we doubt his innocence, but because this is what the party rules require." The TUV noted that the sex offences related "to a period long before he was a member of this party". The TUV chose one of its unsuccessful 2011 candidates, Timothy Gaston, to replace Tweed as a councillor.

== Personal life ==
Tweed was born on a farm outside Dunloy in Ballymoney, County Antrim in November 1959. He married Margaret in 1984 and they had four children; the family lived in Ballymoney. Prior to his 2012 conviction Tweed was estranged from his wife and had been living in Ballymena. Employed as an infrastructure supervisor for Northern Ireland Railways, he previously worked as a bouncer at a Ballymoney bar.

Tweed died in a motorcycle crash on 28 October 2021 in County Antrim, at the age of 61.

Following his death, members of his family and the victims of his since-quashed conviction spoke of the effect of his sexual and physical abuse on them.
