= Ulster Unionist Coalition Party =

Political party in Northern Ireland

The Ulster Unionist Coalition Party (UUCP) was a minor unionist political formation in Northern Ireland.

Following a split in the Democratic Unionist Party (DUP) majority bloc in Ballymena in 2007, six councillors who objected to the DUP's agreement to share power in the Northern Ireland Executive with Sinn Féin left the DUP and redesignated themselves as the "Ulster Unionist Coalition Party". In May 2009, four of the group left to join Jim Allister's Traditional Unionist Voice (TUV).

This left the UUCP with just two councillors. It lost one of those seats on the imprisonment in June 2010 of councillor William Wilkinson, head of research for the pressure group Families Acting for Innocent Relatives, following his conviction for rape. The remaining UUCP councillor, Davy Tweed, also joined TUV, was re-elected in 2011 to Ballymena Borough Council and was subsequently imprisoned for the sexual abuse of children. The UUCP now has no elected representative and is not registered with the Electoral Commission.
