= Protestant Coalition =

- Leader: Jim Dowson (2013); Robert McKee (2013-2015)
- Founder: Jim Dowson
- Founded: 24 April 2013
- Dissolved: 4 November 2015
- Headquarters: Belfast, Northern Ireland
- Ideology: Irish Unionism; Ulster loyalism British nationalism Christian fundamentalism
- Political position: Far-right
- Religion: Protestantism
- Colours: Red, white and blue
- Northern Ireland Assembly: 0 / 108
- Local government in Northern Ireland: 0 / 582

The Protestant Coalition was a minor Ulster loyalist political party in Northern Ireland. It was registered on 23 April 2013, and launched on 24 April at a hotel in Castlereagh, outside Belfast. It deregistered in November 2015 without contesting any seat.

== Background ==
The launch of the Protestant Coalition followed a protracted dispute over the decision by Belfast City Council on 3 December 2012 to cease the practice of flying the Union Flag throughout the year over Belfast City Hall, opting instead to fly it only on up to 20 designated days per year. The council decision, by 29 votes (Alliance, Sinn Féin and Social Democratic and Labour Party) to 21 (mainly Ulster Unionist Party (UUP) and Democratic Unionist Party (DUP)), had been followed by protests throughout Northern Ireland, some of which became violent. Protesters claimed that the flag decision was symptomatic of an erosion of respect for the identity of what they refer to as the PUL (Protestant unionist loyalist) community.

== Leadership ==
The party's founders included prominent anti-republican campaigner Willie Frazer; Davy Nicholl, a former member of the Ulster Defence Association-linked Ulster Democratic Party and Ulster Political Research Group; and Jim Dowson, a former fundraiser for the British National Party (BNP). Others involved in the launch were Alice Dowson, daughter of Jim; Robert Magee, from the Woodvale area of Belfast; and Bill Hill, from Tiger's Bay.

At the time of the launch, both Frazer and Jim Dowson were awaiting trial on charges related to the flag protests. Although Dowson was registered with the Electoral Commission as the Protestant Coalition's leader, he stated at the launch that the Coalition had no one leader. Paul Golding, leader of Britain First and a former BNP councillor in Sevenoaks and until 2011 the BNP's Communications Officer, was registered as the Coalition's treasurer.

Dowson, a Christian fundamentalist, also led an anti-abortion campaign, the UK Life League. In May 2011 he and Golding had launched a new far-right, nationalist movement in Britain, Britain First, to protect "British and Christian morality" and campaign against Islam, immigration and abortion. Britain First registered as a political party in November 2011. Golding had flown into Belfast in December 2012 to help co-ordinate the protests over the flags issue.

== Policies ==
The policies of the Coalition, which described itself as "an anti politics, political party", included opposition to "the whole old rotten farce of the DUP/UUP", while it was "happy to cooperate with the likes of the TUV, UKIP and PUP for the greater good of the overall situation". It appealed for those elected for other unionist parties to defect to the Coalition. The party stated that it "exists to protect and secure Ulster's British heritage and identity and to represent the Protestant, Unionist and Loyalist people", and to oppose "the Sinn Féin/IRA cultural and political 'war' against the British majority in Northern Ireland".

In 2015 the Protestant Coalition started a campaign to prevent refugees from Syria and other countries fleeing the Middle East from being allowed to settle in Northern Ireland.

== History ==
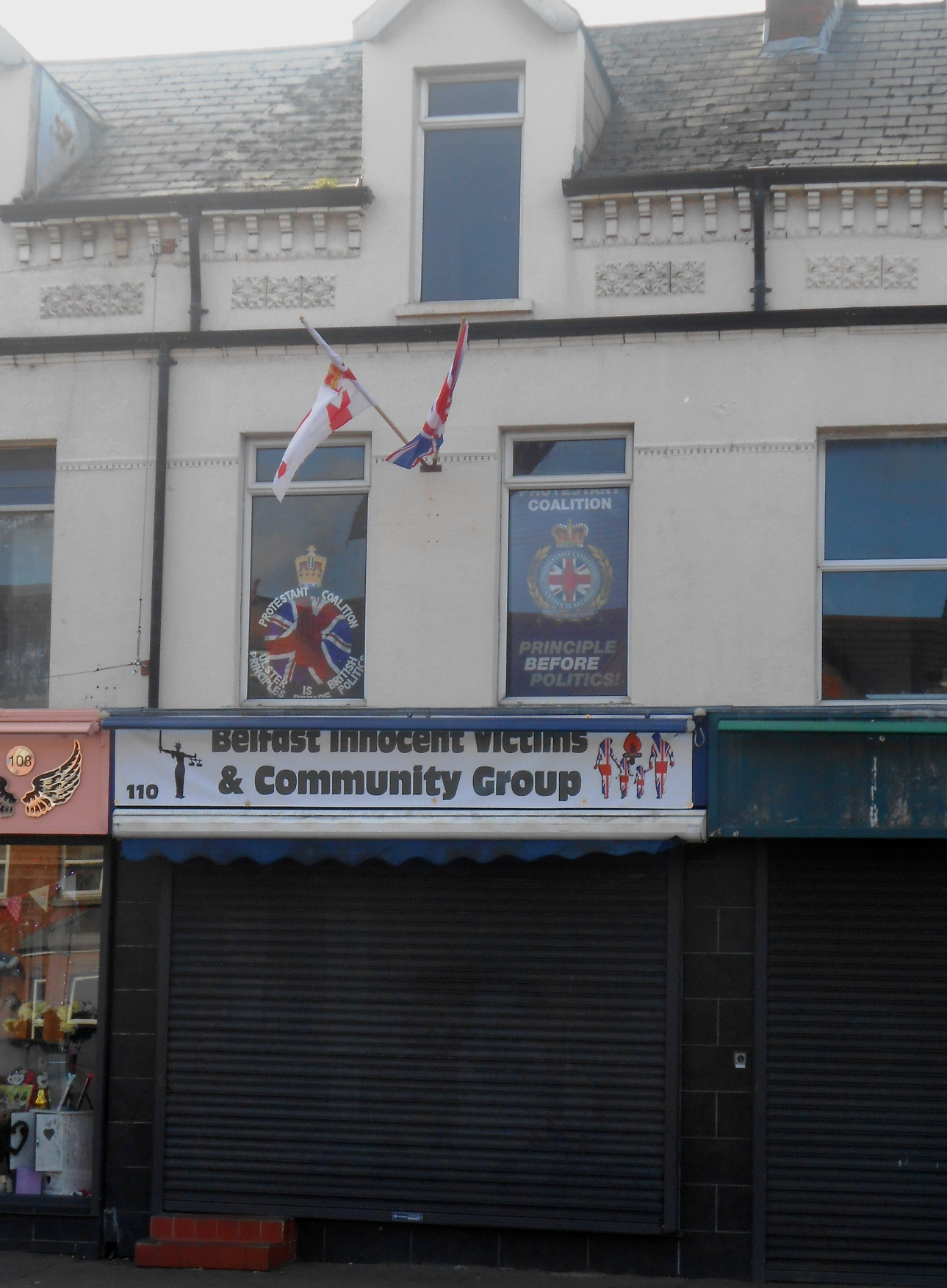
Party office on York Road, Belfast

The party claimed at its launch to have over 500 members, and that it would remain in existence for three years, during which time it would contest elections to new local government councils in May 2014. It also said that it would operate a call centre and use other techniques deployed in American political campaigning. The Coalition aimed to "cascade down to other Loyal parties, groups and organisations the skill-sets and technology to allow the PUL community to professionalise and expand our message". Dowson said that "if anyone thinks this is a Mickey Mouse thing... they are going to be in for a very rude awakening".

Within weeks of its launch, the Coalition was reported to be in disarray, having suffered the loss of several leading supporters. Jim Dowson had left by the end of May 2013, for unknown reasons; Davy Nicholl had left, citing health reasons; and Bill Hill was said to be "keeping a low profile" (in 2015 Hill briefly acted as head of the UDA North Belfast Brigade). Both Frazer and Jim Dowson were still awaiting trial on flag protest charges, and Frazer – who suggested that the party might "reorganise with a different line-up" – also faced a court appearance in relation to an alleged breach of his bail conditions.

In 2014 it was reported that local unionists in Magherafelt had set up a branch of the party, in response to claims of DUP "lies and deceit" in the town. Frazer had been locked out of a council meeting in the town a few weeks previously.

Local government elections were held in Northern Ireland in May 2014 but the Protestant Coalition did not present any candidates.

The party officially de-registered on 4 November 2015 and is no longer a political party.
