= Donaghadee F.C. =

Donaghadee
- Full name: Donaghadee Football Club
- Stadium: Crommelin Park
- Chairman: Michael Robinson
- League: Northern Amateur Football League
- Website: donaghadeefc.com

Donaghadee Football Club, referred to simply as Donaghadee, is a Northern Irish, intermediate football club playing in the Northern Amateur Football League. The club is based in Donaghadee, County Down. The club plays in the Irish Cup.

Donaghadee play their home games at Crommelin Park.

== History ==
In 2023, the Belfast High Court ruled that Donaghadee F.C.'s chairman, Michael Robinson, was personally liable for a £32,007 legal costs bill owed to the Irish Football Association. The debt stemmed from the club's failed arbitration challenge to the IFA's decision to curtail the 2019-2020 football season due to the Covid-19 pandemic.

Michael Robinson, assisted by Jamie Bryson, argued that the arbitration agreement was invalid because he lacked the authority to enter into it. However, the judge, Madam Justice McBride, ruled that he was personally liable because he had authorized another committee member to sign the contract, and a valid debt was owed by the club as an unincorporated association.
