= 2006 Dublin riots =

Riots in Dublin, Ireland (2006)

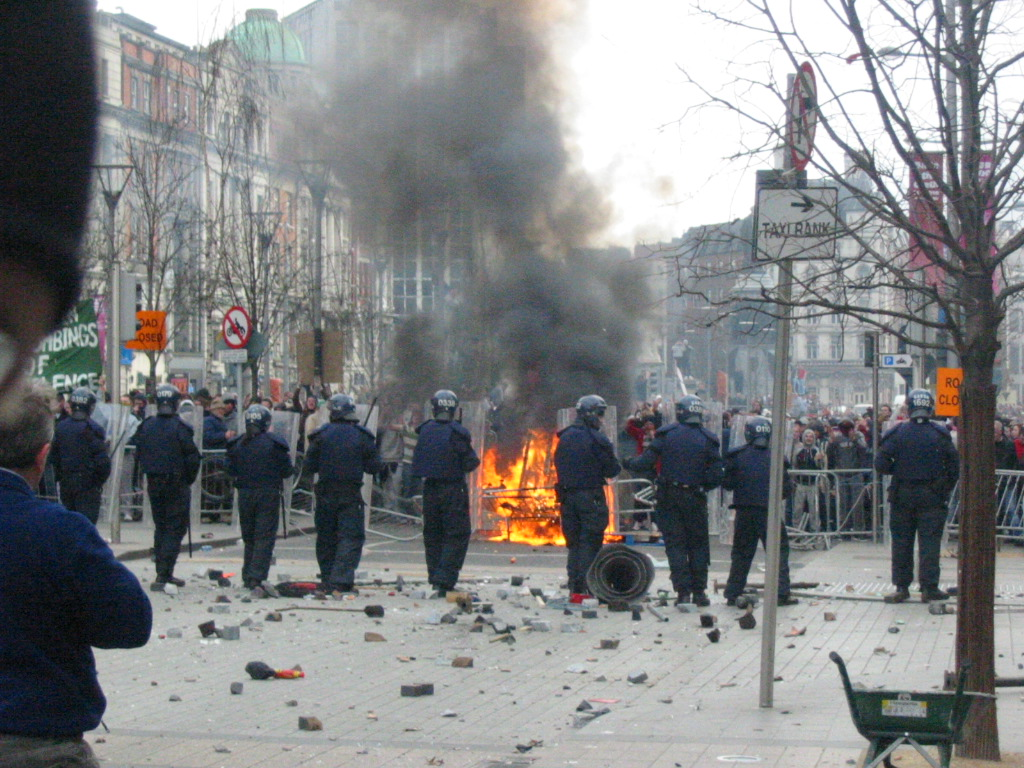
- Garda Public Order Unit on O'Connell Street
- Date: 25 February 2006
- Location: O'Connell Street, Dublin
- Caused by: Planned march in Dublin by Ulster Unionists under the "Love Ulster" banner
- Methods: Riots; Protests; Looting; Vandalism; Arson; Assault

Result
- Injuries: 14 hospitalised
- Arrested: 41
- Charged: 26

A series of riots in Dublin on 25 February 2006 was precipitated by a proposed march down O'Connell Street of a unionist demonstration. The disturbances began when members of the Garda Síochána attempted to disperse a group of counter-demonstrators blocking the route of the proposed march. The situation escalated as local youths joined forces with the counter-demonstrators.

== Background ==
Love Ulster was a Unionist organisation dedicated to commemorating the Unionist victims of The Troubles in Northern Ireland. It was organised in part by Willie Frazer of Families Acting for Innocent Relatives (FAIR). It was a partisan group established to voice outrage at killings by the Republican paramilitary organisations, but it has been criticised for not doing the same for victims of loyalist paramilitary organisations. Frazer had said of loyalist paramilitary prisoners that "They should never have been locked up in the first place", and that he had "a lot of time for Billy Wright."

The Love Ulster march in Dublin was to consist of a uniformed band, several hundred activists (including some from the Orange Order) and relatives of victims, all of whom would march from Parnell Street north of the River Liffey, down O'Connell Street, past Trinity College onto Nassau Street, Dawson Street and Molesworth Street, and eventually reaching Leinster House, the seat of the Oireachtas (the Irish parliament), on Kildare Street.

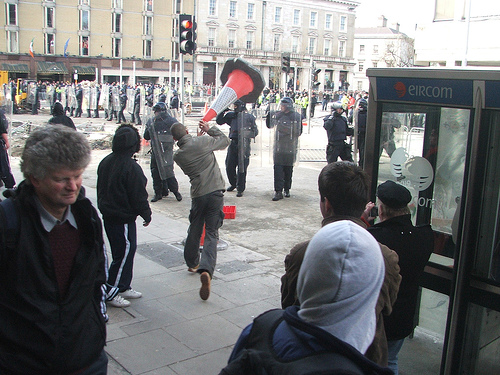
A protester throws a cone at riot police

The march of this group in Dublin was viewed as provocative by some Irish nationalists and many Irish republicans, particularly in the context of an Orange Order march. The Orange Order has been accused of being a sectarian organisation and is known for its anti-Catholicism. The right to march was supported by the main Irish political parties and the march was authorised by the Garda Síochána. Love Ulster had organised a similar rally in Belfast in October 2005.

At previous FAIR rallies, a picture of an Ulster Volunteer Force member who was allegedly involved in the murder of 26 people in Dublin in the 1974 Dublin and Monaghan Bombings, and who was himself killed by the Provisional IRA in 1976, had been displayed. An organiser of the Love Ulster demonstration previously told a republican newspaper that he would not guarantee that images of the murder suspect would not be displayed during the demonstration.

== The riot ==
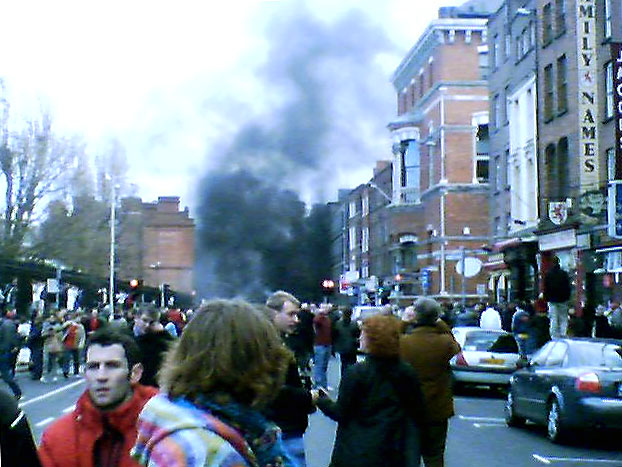
Car on fire on Nassau Street

Sinn Féin, an Irish republican political party, did not organise a protest and said that the march should be allowed to go ahead, calling for republicans to ignore the march. Republican Sinn Féin, a splinter political party no longer affiliated with Sinn Féin, had an organised presence.

Their protest blocked the northeastern junction of O'Connell Street and Parnell Street. The small Republican Sinn Féin group (and some activists from the Irish Republican Socialist Party) were joined by several hundred local youths. Before the violence broke out, they chanted republican chants. Several thousand bystanders were also on the scene but took no part in the subsequent rioting. When the marchers had formed up at the top of Parnell Square and their bands began to play in anticipation of the start of the march, gardaí attempted to disperse the protest at around 12:45. At this point, scuffles broke out between protesters and Gardaí.

After the failure of the initial garda effort to disperse the protesters, the violence escalated. The Garda Public Order Unit was deployed and stones and metal railings – to be used for renovation work on O'Connell Street – were thrown at gardaí by protesters; as were fireworks, bricks, crude petrol bombs, and other missiles. As the rioting continued, the ranks of the rioters were swelled by many local teenagers who had not taken part in the initial protest. Several barricades were constructed from building materials on the street to impede the march and the gardaí. The march was due to start at 12:30, but as the violence went on the gardaí decided against trying to escort the marchers through O'Connell Street, and at about 13:30 the assembled marchers returned to the coaches that had brought them to Dublin from Northern Ireland. The three coaches were then driven to Leinster House, where a small parade was carried out, and a letter was handed to Irish Minister for Justice, Michael McDowell. They were then escorted out of the city. One of the coaches was attacked by stone throwers on the way home.

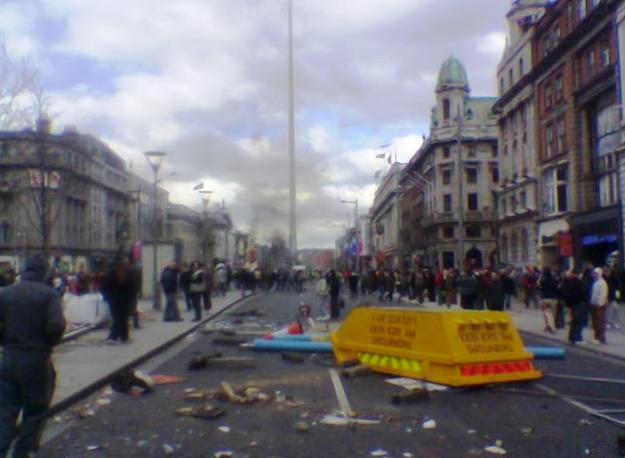
Looking northward up O'Connell Street during the riots. In the background a black plume of smoke from the burning contents of a skip engulfs The Spire; in the foreground is another, upturned skip amongst building debris

Violence continued sporadically on O'Connell Street for another hour or so. The Gardaí, advancing from the northern end of the street gradually pushed the rioters back southwards. The most sustained violence took place around the General Post Office building, where the rioters initially sat down in protest and then, several of them having been batoned, regrouped behind burning barricades and threw rocks, paving slabs and one or possibly two petrol bombs at Gardaí. Several Gardaí, protesters and a number of journalists from RTÉ and TV3 were injured. RTÉ's chief news correspondent, Charlie Bird was singled out for attack by some rioters and was kicked and punched while being called an "Orange bastard" before being rescued by the Garda SDU officers. Charlie Bird had been a member of the Workers' Party which had split from Sinn Féin in 1970 and was seen as highly critical of the Republican Movement. However some of the violence appeared to be entirely random in its targets. For instance, several bystanders were attacked and a woman who was five months pregnant was punched in the stomach. The woman later sent a text message to NewsTalk 106 to thank the Gardaí and ambulance service who looked after her after the incident. In addition, the windows of several businesses, including Foot Locker, Schuh, and Ulster Bank near O'Connell Bridge, were smashed and at least one shop (Foot Locker shoe shop) was looted. Among those arrested for looting this shop were a number of foreign nationals as well as locals – indicating that in the latter stages of the riot, much of the disturbances were opportunistic – inspired by vandalism or desire for theft rather than politically motivated.

While the standoff on O'Connell Street was still going on, several hundred rioters followed the Unionist coaches to the Nassau Street area where they set alight a number of cars and damaged several businesses. Again the attacks on cars and businesses in this area appears to have been entirely at random. On the other hand, the headquarters of the now defunct Progressive Democrats party (who were very critical of the Irish Republican movement) on South Frederick Street off Nassau Street was also attacked, which seems to indicate at least some political motivation among the rioters. Further skirmishes broke out around the River Liffey at O'Connell Bridge, Aston Quay, Fleet Street and Temple Bar, as the Gardaí re-took O'Connell street, before the rioters dispersed. The most serious property damage was in the Nassau Street area, where three cars were burnt out, windscreens were smashed, and businesses had their windows broken. Many people also became trapped in shops and restaurants, including branches of McDonald's and Burger King.

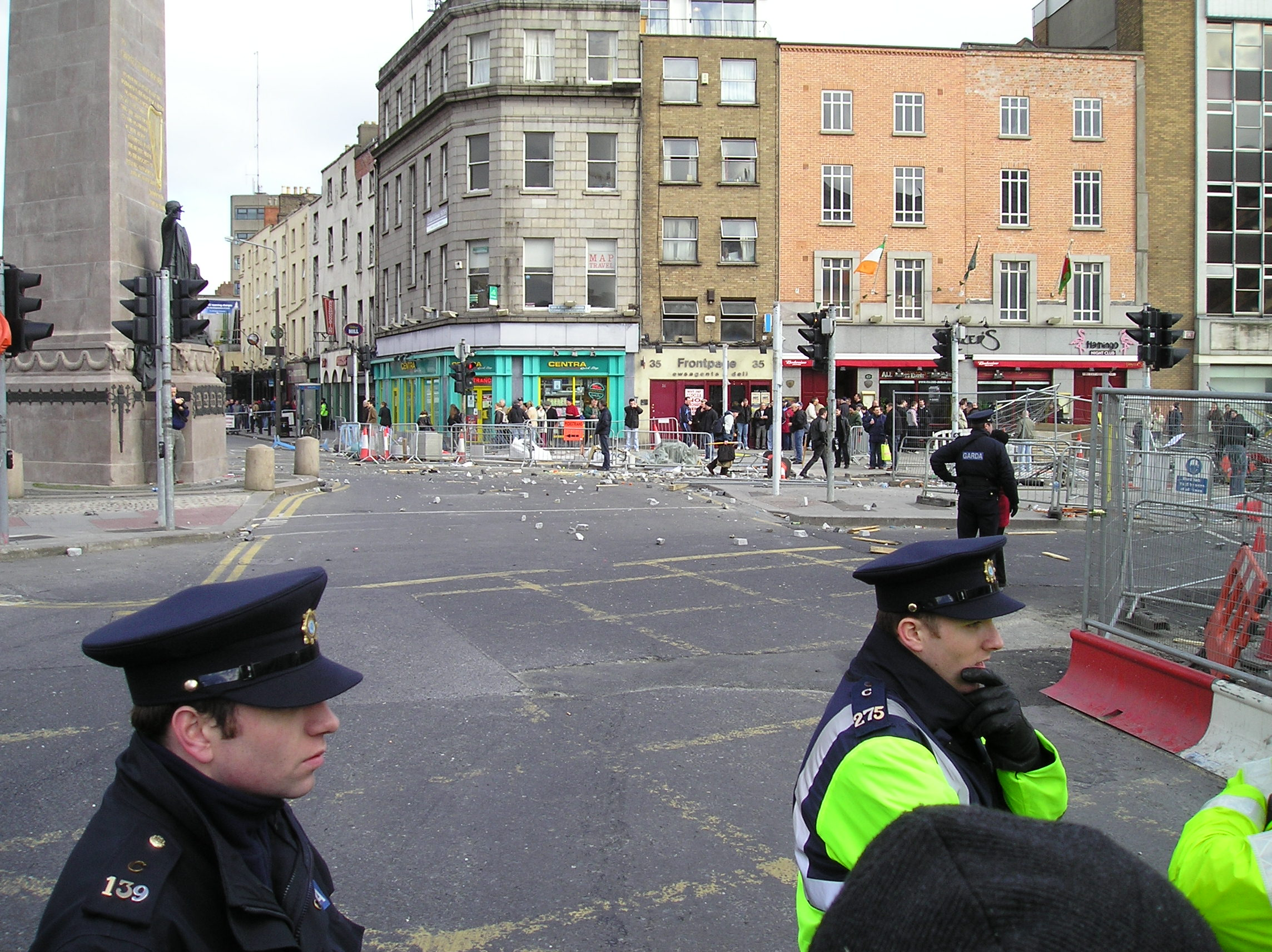
Gardaí on a rubbish-strewn O'Connell Street beside the Parnell Monument after rioters dispersed

Having eventually dispersed the rioters, the gardaí then closed O'Connell Street to facilitate a cleanup of the scene by building workers. Media reports have estimated the cost of the cleanup job at €50,000, and Dublin Chamber of Commerce placed loss of earnings for businesses in the city due to the riots at €10,000,000.

Estimates for the number of unionist marchers before the event were predicted to be over 1,000. However, only eight coach loads turned up in Dublin, indicating a far smaller number, in the region of 3–400. Estimates for the number of counter-demonstrators vary between 300 and 7,000. The number is made much more difficult to determine by the presence of the several thousand bystanders at the scene who did not take part. Most of the rioters appeared to be local youths, though some who brandished leaflets and other political literature were clearly political activists.

== Injuries and arrests ==
A total of 14 people, including six gardaí and a small number of journalists and photographers, were hospitalised as a result of the rioting. A further 41 people were arrested, according to RTÉ news. As of 27 February 2006, 13 had been charged. Twenty-six people were convicted in January 2009 for their part in the disturbances and given sentences of up to five years. Two were described as 'alcoholics'. One of them and a teenage boy were 'homeless'. Three were not Irish – one Georgian, a Romanian and a Moldovan were convicted of looting shops on O’Connell Street. Two had travelled from Offaly, one from Galway and one from Donegal for the riot. All the rest came from Dublin.

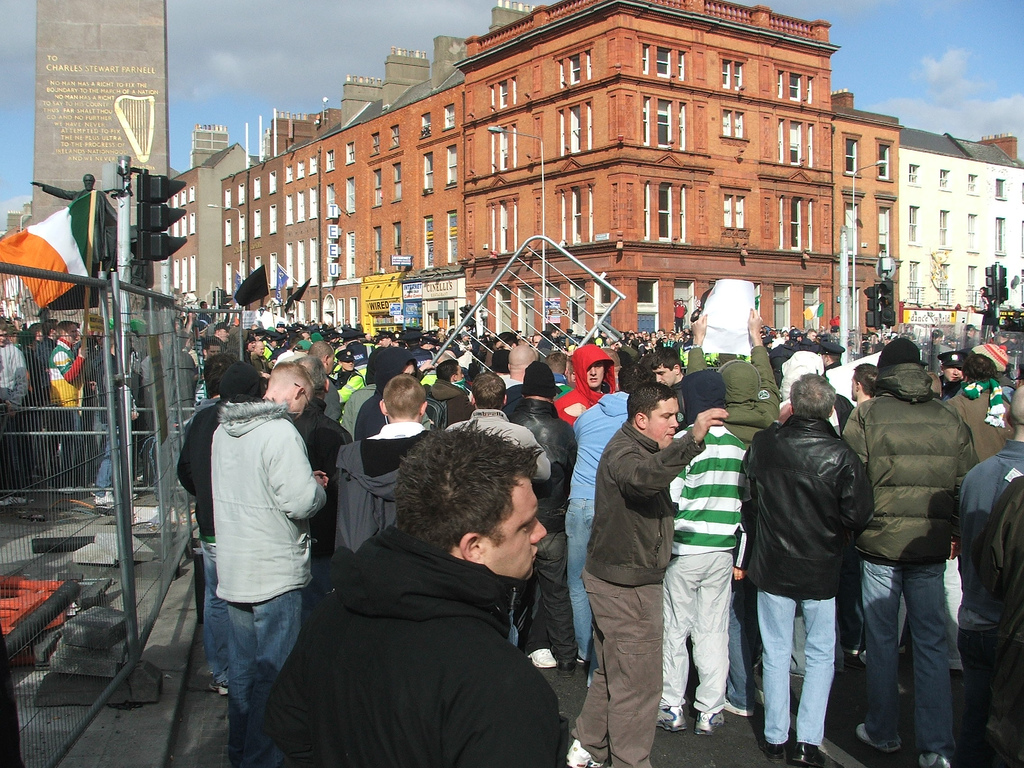
Barricades being thrown

== Official condemnation ==
Then-Taoiseach Bertie Ahern condemned the riots, saying, "It is the essence of Irish democracy and republicanism that people are allowed to express their views freely and in a peaceful manner. People who wantonly attack Gardaí and property have no respect for their fellow citizens." Minister for Justice Michael McDowell, opposition leaders Enda Kenny of Fine Gael and Pat Rabbitte of the Labour Party and Sinn Féin Dublin TD Sean Crowe also condemned the day's events.

Sinn Féin leader Gerry Adams added his voice to the condemnation, saying, "There is no justification for what happened this afternoon in Dublin. Sinn Féin had appealed to people to ignore this loyalist parade and not to be provoked by it. Our view was that it should not be opposed in any way and we made that clear. Regrettably a small, unrepresentative group chose to ignore our appeal." The President of Ireland, Mary McAleese, also condemned the rioters. Jeffrey Donaldson of the Democratic Unionist Party, who was in Dublin to address the Love Ulster march, said he was 'appalled' by the violence.

Mary Harney leader of the government coalition member Progressive Democrats party, whose offices were attacked by rioters said, "I don't have much respect for the Orange Order, because it is a sectarian, bigoted organisation, but I do respect people's right to march... I think that they have got a great coup in being prevented from marching. Those that sought to stop them have played right into their hands."

Among the few groups not to condemn the day's events were Republican Sinn Féin, who issued a statement condemning what they said was an "underestimate of the true level of opposition to the march by the Irish government" and the Irish Socialist Workers Party, who stated in a press release that "Socialists do not join in the condemnation of young working-class people who riot against the police".

O'Connell Street was closed off while the disturbances were occurring and afterwards for the clean-up operation but was re-opened later in the evening, although the majority of local businesses remained closed for the rest of the day.

== See also ==
- Dublin riot, for other riots in Dublin
