= Dublin riot =

Dublin riot or Dublin riots may refer to:

- Dublin election riot, 1713
- Dublin, Georgia riot, 1919
- 1933 Dublin riot
- Lansdowne Road football riot, 1995
- 2006 Dublin riots
- 2021 Dublin riots
- 2023 Dublin riot
