= UK Life League =

Anti-abortion group

UK Life League is a British pressure group that opposes abortion. It describes itself as "The premier pro-life and family values campaigning organisation" and as "peacefully campaigning to end the violence of abortion". Life League is led by James Dowson, a Christian fundamentalist from Glasgow, based in Northern Ireland. Formerly a fundraiser for the British National Party, Dowson set up a new nationalist movement, Britain First, in May 2011, and in April 2013 helped to found the Protestant Coalition political party.

== Controversies ==
The group regularly sends explicit images of aborted foetuses discovered in British hospital refuse, to pro-choice organisations, hospitals and individuals such as newspaper columnists and the blogger Simon Howard, who they believe oppose their position. A spokesperson for Marie Stopes UK stated in 2006 that aborted foetuses had not been disposed of in such a manner for over 20 years, and alleged that the "images come from American websites, and some look as if they have been tampered with." In 2005, Life League activist Veronica Connolly was prosecuted for sending offensive images to a pharmacy distributing the morning-after pill. In January 2007 Connolly lost an appeal to the High Court.

In 2005, the group published the address and telephone number of Woldingham School, a Catholic boarding school, whose headmistress they accused of "child abuse" and of teaching pupils "types of contraception they can use to facilitate recreational sex". The school responded that, "What we teach falls entirely within the national curriculum and the way in which we teach the use of contraception is in the context of a committed relationship. Every Catholic school in the country will be doing what we are doing", and expressed concern that the publication of the school's details had endangered its pupils.

Life League's tactics have been described by the police as "akin to those of animal rights extremists" and the group's activities have been investigated by the National Extremism Tactical Coordination Unit.

In 2006, the group characterised ethical guideline proposals by the Royal College of Obstetricians and Gynaecologists and the Nuffield Council on Bioethics that severely premature babies likely to suffer from severe disabilities not necessarily be revived as "calls for severely disabled babies to be killed at birth" and as "baby euthanasia".
