= Jayda Fransen =

British activist

Leader of the Christian Nationalist Party
- Incumbent
- Assumed office 2025
- Preceded by: Position established

Leader of Britain First
- Acting; December 2016 – June 2017
- Preceded by: Paul Golding
- Succeeded by: Paul Golding

Deputy leader of Britain First
- In office July 2014 – January 2019
- Leader: Paul Golding

Personal details
- Born: Jayda Kaleigh Fransen; March 1986 (age 40)
- Party: Christian Nationalist Party (2025–present)
- Other political affiliations: British Freedom Party (2020–2025); Britain First (2011–2019)
- Criminal charges: Religiously aggravated harassment
- Criminal penalty: 36 weeks imprisonment
- Website: jaydafransen.online

Jayda Kaleigh Fransen (born March 1986) is a British politician and activist. Formerly involved with the English Defence League (EDL), she left due to its association with drink-fuelled violence. She then joined the far-right political party Britain First. With Paul Golding as leader, Fransen was deputy leader of the party from 2014 to 2019. She became acting leader for six months from December 2016 to June 2017, while Golding was imprisoned in December 2016.

Fransen has been an unsuccessful candidate in several elections since 2014. In addition to online anti-Islamic activism, she has marched while holding a white cross, in what she called "Christian patrols", through predominantly Muslim populated areas of Britain. In March 2018, she was sentenced to 36 weeks' imprisonment after being convicted of three counts of religiously aggravated harassment.

She co-founded the Christian Nationalist Party in 2025, and leads the organisation alongside Jim Dowson.

== Political career ==
=== Leadership of Britain First ===
Britain First, formed in 2011, is a British fascist political party founded by Jim Dowson. Paul Golding became the leader following the resignation of Dowson, and during this time Fransen was the deputy leader of the party. Golding handed over the leadership role to Fransen in November 2016 due to his being sentenced to 2 months in prison for breaching a court order, although Fransen stated that his leave was in order "to address some important, personal family issues". Fransen stepped down from her leadership role in January 2019 and left the party. She has been described as part of the counter-jihad movement.

In a May 2019 BBC Northern Ireland Spotlight documentary, Fransen accused Paul Golding of violent abuse.

=== Rochester and Strood by-election, 2014 ===
Fransen stood as Britain First's first parliamentary candidate for the Rochester and Strood by-election on 20 November 2014, during which she expressed sympathy for the UK Independence Party (UKIP) and its candidate Mark Reckless (a Conservative MP who had switched allegiances to UKIP), who went on to win the seat.

Britain First's campaign for the by-election drew attention when the party uploaded a photo of Fransen together with local activists from UKIP, who responded by saying that the activists were not aware of the implications of the photograph, while Fransen said that the UKIP activists asked for the photo and that she was under the impression that there were strong similarities between the two parties. The BBC presenter Nick Robinson was also criticised for his selfie with Fransen during the by-election. Robinson said he did not know who Fransen was and denied supporting her policies.

=== London mayoral and Assembly elections, 2016 ===
On 27 September 2015, Paul Golding announced that he would stand as a candidate in the 2016 London mayoral election. In a Facebook post on the decision, Fransen wrote that the party's "pro-EU, Islamist-loving opponents" will "face the wrath of the Britain First movement ... We will not rest until every traitor is punished for their crimes against our country. And by punished, I mean good old fashioned British justice at the end of a rope!" Golding failed to win the mayoralty, and had his back turned while the successful Labour candidate, Sadiq Khan, delivered his victory speech. For the simultaneous London Assembly election, Fransen headed Britain First's list of candidates for the candidates to be additional members, though neither she nor the party won any seats.

=== British Freedom Party ===
In January 2021, Fransen said she would stand for the Glasgow Southside seat, held by Nicola Sturgeon, in the 2021 Scottish Parliament election. Fransen and Sturgeon had a tense confrontation outside a polling station on election day. Fransen received 46 votes (0.1%), coming last. She also received the fewest votes among the 357 constituency candidates in the election.

=== 2021 Batley and Spen by-election ===
The 2021 Batley and Spen by-election followed the resignation of Tracy Brabin after she was elected as Mayor of West Yorkshire. Fransen came second to last with 50 votes.

=== 2022 Southend West by-election ===
After the murder of the Conservative MP David Amess in October 2021, Fransen said she would be running for the vacancy in Southend West for the British Freedom Party. All major parties in the UK apart from the Conservatives had already announced that they would refrain from nominating a candidate in order to avoid exploitation of the murder. She received 299 votes, 2% of the total vote. As with her campaign in the 2021 Batley and Spen by-election, she was recorded as an independent candidate and not a representative of the British Freedom Party.

=== 2022 Wakefield by-election ===
In June 2022, standing as an independent, she received 23 votes (0.1%) in the Wakefield by-election, the lowest of 15 candidates.

== Legal issues ==
=== 2016 conviction and arrest ===
After one of Britain First's "Christian patrols" in Luton, in November 2016, Fransen was convicted of religiously aggravated harassment and ordered to pay a fine of £1,000 after she harassed a Muslim mother of four who was wearing a hijab. She was also fined £200 for breaching the Public Order Act 1936 by wearing a political uniform and ordered to pay £620 in costs (including a £100 victim surcharge), and issued with a two-year restraining order to prevent her from contacting the victim or engaging in intimidating behaviour towards her. Fransen had denied all charges, accusing the courts of being "absurd", and engaging in "a really clear display of Islamic appeasement".

=== 2017 arrests and conviction ===
In September 2017, Fransen was arrested with Golding and charged with religious harassment. They were bailed and ordered to appear before Medway magistrates on 17 October 2017. Their arrests followed an investigation by Kent Police into the distribution of leaflets in the Thanet and Canterbury areas, and the posting of online videos during a trial at Canterbury Crown Court in May 2017. On 14 October 2017, following a broadcast on Radio Aryan, Fransen was re-arrested and detained overnight at a protest in Sunderland for breaking the terms of her bail. On 17 October 2017, after Fransen and Golding pleaded not guilty before Medway magistrates, their case was adjourned until a hearing at Folkestone Magistrates' Court on 29 January 2018 and they were both ordered to report weekly at Bromley Police Station.

On 18 November 2017, Fransen was arrested in London by detectives from the Police Service of Northern Ireland in relation to a speech she had made at a rally outside Belfast City Hall on 6 August. She was charged with employing "threatening, abusive or insulting words or behaviour" under the Public Order (Northern Ireland) Order 1987 and on 14 December appeared at Belfast Magistrates' Court, where she pleaded not guilty. Fransen was immediately re-arrested outside the court and charged the following day over anti-Islamic comments posted online in a video filmed on 13 December at a peace wall separating Catholic and Protestant communities in West Belfast; she was ordered to appear in court on 9 January 2018 and released on bail, subject to an exclusion order from all processions and demonstrations in Northern Ireland.

On 29 March 2019, Fransen was convicted of stirring up hatred at the Belfast rally and for separate comments at a peace wall. The other defendants Paul Golding, John Banks and Paul Rimmer, were acquitted on similar charges. Fransen was sentenced to 180 hours community service.

=== 2018 conviction ===
On 7 March 2018, Fransen and Golding were found guilty of religiously aggravated harassment at Folkestone magistrates' court, as a result of an investigation concerning the distribution of leaflets in 2017 in the Thanet and Canterbury areas. The pair were convicted over an incident at a takeaway in Ramsgate, Kent, during which Fransen screamed "paedophile" and "foreigner", while Fransen was also convicted for approaching an address she believed to belong to a Muslim defendant on a rape trial. They were both sentenced to prison, with 36 weeks for Fransen and 18 weeks for Golding.

Kent Police released mugshots of Fransen and Golding, taken when they were originally in custody, because of "the nature of the offences committed and the impact they had on the wider community". The usual procedure is that only offenders sentenced to a year or more in custody have their mugshots released.

Following her release, Jayda left Britain First and formed the British Freedom Party, following an admission by Paul Golding that he attacked Fransen.

== Donald Trump retweets and Twitter suspension ==
On 29 November 2017, President of the United States Donald Trump caused controversy when he retweeted three anti-Muslim videos shared by Fransen on her Twitter account. She responded on Twitter in capital letters, "The President of the United States, Donald Trump, has retweeted three of Deputy Leader Jayda Fransen’s Twitter videos! Donald Trump himself has retweeted these videos and has around 44 million followers! God bless you Trump! God bless America!" Fransen later posted a video of herself requesting Trump to assist her in a forthcoming court case in Belfast. She is reported as saying, "The leader of the free world has signified his disgust at an elected leader being arrested and possibly facing two years in prison over an Islamic blasphemy law. Pakistan and Saudi Arabia have laws where you can't speak out about Islam. The UK doesn't." Describing herself on her Twitter account as "faithful to God and Britannia", she had made over 15,000 tweets since opening the account in mid-2016.

One of the videos (titled "Muslim migrant beats up Dutch boy on crutches!") purported to show an assault by a Muslim immigrant. According to the Dutch embassy in the US, the teenage perpetrator was "born and raised in the Netherlands"; and the embassy later confirmed that he was not Muslim. Another video ("Muslim Destroys a Statue of Virgin Mary!") was filmed during the Syrian civil war in 2013 and showed a man, who is believed to be an Al-Nusra supporter, destroying a statue of Mary. The third video ("Islamist mob pushes teenage boy off roof and beats him to death!") contained footage in Alexandria, Egypt during a period of violent unrest following the 2013 Egyptian coup d'état: it showed supporters of the deposed president Mohamed Morsi attacking one of his critics.

Prime Minister Theresa May condemned Trump's retweets of the anti-Muslim videos, stating that "it is wrong for the president to have done this", and, "Britain First seeks to divide communities through their use of hateful narratives which peddle lies and stoke tensions".

On 18 December 2017, Twitter permanently suspended the accounts of Fransen and Golding, together with the official account of Britain First, as part of its general policy towards any groups which glorify violence or use hate-inciting imagery to fulfill their goals. The company's stated aim in enforcing such bans was to "reduce the amount of abusive behaviour and hateful conduct" on the web. Permanent suspension of an account would result whenever the profile contained "a violent threat or multiple slurs, epithets, racist or sexist tropes, incite[d] fear, or reduce[d] someone to less than human". The three retweets by Trump have been removed as a consequence of Fransen's ban. As a result of the ban, Fransen and Golding joined the Gab social networking service, and urged their followers to do likewise.

The Twitter account of Britain First was reinstated in 2022.

== Electoral history ==
=== Westminster by-elections ===
Date of election	Constituency	Party	Votes	%	Source(s)
20 November 2014	Rochester and Strood	Britain First	56	0.1	
1 July 2021	Batley and Spen	Independent	50	0.13	
3 February 2022	Southend West	Independent	299	2.0	
23 June 2022	Wakefield	Independent	23	0.1	

=== Scottish Parliament elections ===
2021 Scottish Parliament election

Date of election	Constituency	Party	Votes	%	Source(s)
6 May 2021	Glasgow Southside	Independent	46	0.1	
