= Jim Dowson =

British far-right political activist

Ecclesiastical Advisor for the Christian Nationalist Party
- Incumbent
- Assumed office 2025
- Preceded by: Party founded

Leader of the Protestant Coalition
- In office April 2013 – May 2013
- Preceded by: Party founded
- Succeeded by: Robert McKee

Personal details
- Born: James Dowson; 1964 or 1965 (age 60–61) Airdrie, Scotland
- Children: 4
- Occupations: Founder of Britain First, public relations for Knights Templar International
- Political party: Christian Nationalist Party (2025-present)
- Other political affiliations: British Freedom Party (2020-2025); Britain First (2011–2013); Protestant Coalition (2013); BNP (before 2010)

James Dowson (born 1964 or 1965) is a British far-right political activist, Christian nationalist and Ulster loyalist, active in Northern Ireland.

Originally from Airdrie, North Lanarkshire, Scotland, he has been active across the United Kingdom, Europe and the United States and has been described by The Times as "the invisible man of Britain's far right".

After joining and falling out with the Orange Order, Dowson was active as an anti-abortion militant. He joined the far-right British National Party and was in charge of the party's financial affairs. He later helped found and worked as the main source of funding for Britain First from which he resigned in 2014. He was arrested for his participation in the Belfast City Hall flag protests in late-2012 and was also involved in the Protestant Coalition, a party formed by some involved in the protests. Subsequently, he has also been active in the anti-immigrant Knights Templar International and supporting Donald Trump's 2016 election campaign.

Dowson presents Templar Report on Purged TV every Sunday to Friday which has Nick Griffin, the former BNP and National Front leader, as a regular guest.

== Activities ==
=== Anti-abortion activism ===
Dowson was a Calvinist minister before entering politics. He was for a time a member of the Orange Order and was associated with a controversial flute band accused of glorifying loyalist murderer Michael Stone during parades. Dowson subsequently fell out with the Orange Order after he was forced to leave the movement, even taking part in protests against it where he denounced the group as being filled with "atheists and boozers".

He came to wider attention for his campaigning against abortion, establishing his own group, the UK Life League, in 1999 after meeting with the leaders of Youth Defence, a militant anti-abortion group active in the Republic of Ireland. He courted controversy by setting up a website that published the personal details of sexual health workers, as well as encouraging supporters to bombard Paul Goggins with messages after the Northern Irish Health Secretary had mooted the possibility of relaxing Northern Ireland's tough anti-abortion laws. When the Marie Stopes Clinic (a family planning clinic denounced by its critics as pro-abortion) opened in Belfast in 2012, Dowson took a leading role in the protests that followed. Dowson has also stated that he worked as part of the United States anti-abortion movement and used much of what he learned there as part of his career in public relations.

It has been reported that during his campaigns Dowson has picked up several criminal convictions, notably for breach of the peace in 1986, possession of a weapon and breach of the peace in 1991, and criminal damage in 1992. Dowson has, however, denied all of these claims apart from the conviction for breach of the peace, which he insisted was for an incident in his youth.

Matt Collins, a former member of the National Front, who now monitors the far-right with anti-fascist group Hope Not Hate said of Jim Dowson in an interview with Channel 4 News in 2014:

Jim Dowson has raised money for extreme right-wing, anti-abortion or anti-gay groups, has protested outside abortion clinics, and made a living from heaping misery on people in desperate circumstances.

=== British National Party ===
Dowson joined the British National Party at an unspecified date and became a leading figure within the group, rising to take charge of the BNP's financial affairs. He has claimed that in this role he raised £4 million for the party. Dowson's financial role with the party began in late 2007.

Having relocated to Ballygowan from Glasgow, Dowson set up a BNP call centre at the Carrowreagh Business Centre in Dundonald on the outskirts of Belfast. Dowson ran the centre under the name of Adlorr-ies.com Ltd, a Leicestershire-based company he had established.

Dowson announced his departure from the BNP in 2010 and stated that he intended to start an anti-Islamic Christian group. According to a report in the Daily Record, Dowson had also faced an allegation that he had groped a female BNP worker.

=== Britain First ===
Dowson's involvement in Britain First, a far-right party led by the former BNP councillor Paul Golding, first came to light in 2012 when the English Defence League repudiated any connections to the group on the basis that Dowson was involved and they considered him financially untrustworthy. In 2014, it was publicly revealed that Dowson was the main source of funding behind the group. According to a report on the Channel 4 news programme, Dowson was the "ideological guru" of the group. In fact, Dowson had been a founder of the group in 2010 but did not take a public role. According to the anti-fascist group Hope Not Hate he had been the driving force behind the group's foundation and had used it to attack the BNP leader Nick Griffin, with whom he had had a bitter falling-out.

Dowson announced his resignation from Britain First in July 2014 after the group, under a policy initiated by Golding, started launching "invasions" of mosques. Dowson described the initiative as "provocative and counterproductive" as well as "unacceptable and unchristian". The story about the mosque attacks had been broken by Channel 4 on the same news programme that named Dowson as the group's leading figure.

=== Northern Ireland ===
Dowson became a leading figure in the Belfast City Hall flag protests that broke out in late 2012 after Belfast City Council voted to only fly the Union Flag from Belfast City Hall on seventeen designated days a year rather than all the time as had previously been the practice. In March of the following year, Dowson was arrested for his part in the protests. He was charged with encouraging or assisting offenders and five counts of taking part in an unnotified public procession due to his part in the protests. At a subsequent court appearance Dowson and some of his co-defendants dressed in Islamic-style clothing. In 2015, Dowson was given a three-month suspended sentence for taking part in unlawful public processions in relation to offences during January and February 2013. Dowson pleaded guilty to three counts of participating in un-notified public processions.

Dowson joined Willie Frazer at the 2013 LaMon Hotel press conference at which the Protestant Coalition, a political party launched on the back of the flag protests, was officially established. He subsequently claimed that he left the party to Frazer and Rab McKee after a few months and bemoaned the failure of the group to make any impact on local politics.

=== Eastern Europe and Knights Templar International ===
Knights Templar International

Knights Templar International (KTI) is a far-right militant Christian organization based in the United Kingdom. The group draws inspiration from the historical Knights Templar and promotes a platform combining Christian fundamentalism and nationalist ideologies. KTI has gained notoriety for its controversial activities and associations, particularly under the influence of figures such as Jim Dowson.

Dowson relocated to Budapest, Hungary, and has been observed in several eastern European countries with his latest venture, Knights Templar International (KTI), along with the former BNP leader Nick Griffin and a Hungarian anti-abortion campaigner Imre Teglasy. Dowson's last sighting, according to the Daily Mirror, was on the Turkey–Bulgaria border with the KTI supplying equipment to a vigilante paramilitary group, the Shipka Bulgarian National Movement, to hunt down asylum seekers. Dowson was subsequently reported as having developed close links with the Russian extremist Aleksandr Dugin, with Dugin aiding Dowson in the establishment of a Belgrade office for his internet activity in support of the "alt-right". The KTI has also been described as part of the counter-jihad movement.

In May 2017, it was reported by Hope not Hate that Dowson had been stopped from entering Hungary after the Hungarian Immigration Authority declared him an "undesirable individual" and barred him from entering the country in future. The move came as part of a wider crackdown by the Ministry of Interior on far-right individuals from across Europe using the country as their base, after Horst Mahler had been arrested trying to escape charges of Holocaust denial in Germany by entering Hungary.

In May 2018, BBC News reported that Dowson has been fronting the Knights Templar International company with Dowson's sister-in-law Marion Thomas named as one of its directors.

=== Donald Trump ===
In July 2016, Dowson established the "Patriot News Agency" to help elect Donald Trump as President of the United States. Dowson described his strategy as spreading "devastating anti-Clinton, pro-Trump memes and sound bites into sections of the population too disillusioned with politics to have taken any notice of conventional campaigning". The site published an article alleging that Trump's opponent Hillary Clinton was involved in "Satanism, pedophilia", murder, and "other conspiracies". According to the New York Times, postings on this site and others connected to Dowson, as well as Facebook pages "linked to him", were "viewed and shared hundreds of thousands of times".

=== Scottish independence ===
Whilst attending a far-right conference in Budapest in March 2017, Dowson announced his support for Scottish independence, despite his earlier unionist stances. Dowson stated "England is stuffed, England is stuffed totally" and advanced his belief that an independent Scotland "would protect us from the excesses of Muslim domination".

=== Kosovo military equipment ===
In May 2018 the BBC reported that Knights Templar International had claimed to have supplied ballistics vests and communications equipment to Kosovo. It also reported that Dowson had told Kosovan TV that he had personally taken such equipment there.

=== Ireland ===
Jim Dowson has been heavily associated with the Irish Catholic nationalist group Síol na hÉireann (Seed of Ireland), especially the group's founder Niall McConnell. In 2019, Dowson appeared regularly alongside McConnell on his YouTube channel, the two travelling to the European Parliament together with the former BNP leader Nick Griffin. It has been noted that the Síol website is almost identical to sites that belong to Dowson, such as that of the British Freedom Movement and Knights Templar International, selling variations of the same merchandise.

Operating from Donegal, Síol na hÉireann has been involved in a number of public activities across Ireland. In June 2020, it made headlines when it confronted a Mayo priest who allowed two members of the Muslim community to give a blessing at Mass. In July 2020, it led a "colour party" at the head of march in Dublin in protest of COVID lockdown restrictions. In January 2022, it hosted an online petition to deport the murderer of the Offaly teacher Ashling Murphy, who was allegedly killed by a non-Irish national.

=== Christian Nationalist Party ===
In 2025 Dowson become involved with the newly created Christian Nationalist Party alongside Jayda Fransen, serving as a part of its leadership team and its Ecclesiastical Advisor.

== Personal life ==
Dowson is the father of four children. He has been described as "a Christian Fundamentalist", a "fundamentalist preacher" and "driven by fundamental extremism".
