= Love Ulster =

Northern Ireland campaign

Love Ulster was a campaign conducted in Northern Ireland in 2005–08. Acting on the behalf of unionist victims of the Troubles, it was organised by the County Armagh Protestant group Families Acting for Innocent Relatives (FAIR), led by Willie Frazer.

== History ==
Love Ulster's first public manifestation was in August 2005, when its members symbolically reenacted the Ulster Volunteer Force's Larne Gun Running of 1914. Love Ulster members brought 200,000 copies of a special edition of the Shankill Mirror newspaper into the port of Larne, bearing the banner headline, "Ulster At Crisis Point", reflecting the group's views that Northern Ireland was then about to be "sold out" into a United Ireland.

On 25 February 2006, a planned Love Ulster march in Dublin was prevented from taking place due to protests culminating in rioting. A second Love Ulster rally in Dublin was discussed as a possibility for the latter part of 2007 and approved by the Garda Síochána. However, it was cancelled following discussions between Frazer and the Irish foreign minister Dermot Ahern.
