= Willie Frazer =

Ulster loyalist activist

- Born: William Frederick Frazer; 8 July 1960
- Died: 28 June 2019 (aged 58); Craigavon, Northern Ireland
- Citizenship: British
- Occupations: Activist, advocate
- Political party: Independent Unionist
- Other political affiliations: Protestant Coalition (2013 - 2015); UIM (1996 - 1998)

William Frederick Frazer (8 July 1960 – 28 June 2019) was a Northern Irish Ulster loyalist activist and advocate for those affected by Irish republican violence in Northern Ireland. He was the founder and leader of the pressure group Families Acting for Innocent Relatives (FAIR). He was also a leader of the Love Ulster campaign and then, the Belfast City Hall flag protests. In the late 1980s during The Troubles, Frazer supplied Ulster Resistance weapons to the Ulster Defence Association. Those weapons were linked to at least 70 paramilitary murders.

His funeral was attended by the leaders of three Unionist political parties: Arlene Foster, Robin Swann and Jim Allister

== Background ==
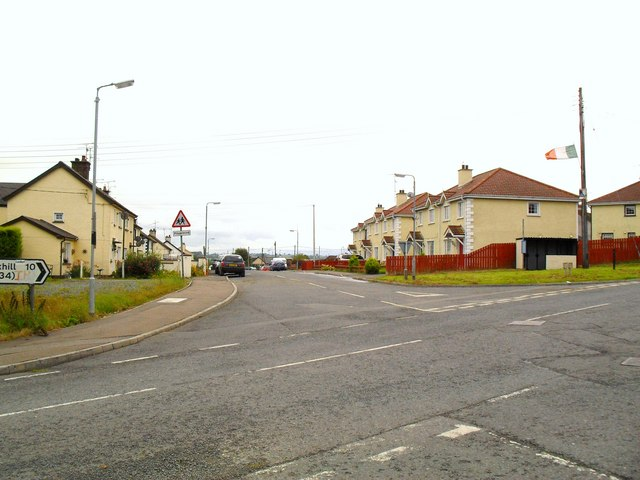
The village of Whitecross, where Frazer grew up

William Frazer grew up in the village of Whitecross, County Armagh, Northern Ireland, as one of nine children, with his parents Bertie and Margaret. He was an ex-member of the Territorial Army, and a member of the Free Presbyterian Church of Ulster. (Note: McKay (2005) p. 195) He attended a local Catholic school and played Gaelic football up to U14 level. Frazer described his early years as a “truly cross-community lifestyle”. Growing up, he was a fan of the American actor John Wayne and wrestling. His father, who was a part-time member of the British Army's Ulster Defence Regiment (UDR) and a council worker, was killed by the Provisional Irish Republican Army (IRA) on 30 August 1975. The family home had previously been attacked with petrol bombs and gunfire which Frazer claimed were IRA men, due to Bertie's UDR membership. Frazer has stated that his family was well respected in the area including by "old-school IRA men" and received Mass cards from Catholic neighbours expressing their sorrow over his father's killing. Frazer believes an IRA member helped carry the coffin at his father's funeral. Over the next ten years four members of Frazer's family who were members or ex-members of the Royal Ulster Constabulary or British Army were killed by the IRA. (Note: McKay (2005) pp. 188–189) An uncle of Frazer's who was a member of the UDR was also wounded in a gun attack. (Note: McKay (2005) p. 194)

Soon after his father's death, the IRA began targeting Frazer's older brother who was also a UDR member. Like many South Armagh unionists, the family moved north to the village of Markethill. He worked for a local haulage company, then set up his own haulage company, which he later sold.

During the Drumcree conflict, Frazer was a supporter of the Portadown Orange Order who were demanding the right to march down the Garvaghy Road against the wishes of local residents. (Note: McKay (2005) pp. 192–193) Frazer was president of his local Apprentice Boys club at the time. (Note: McKay (2005) p. 192)

For a brief period after selling his haulage firm Frazer ran "The Spot", a nightclub in Tandragee, County Armagh, which closed down after two Ulster Protestant civilians who had been in the club, Andrew Robb and David McIlwaine, were stabbed to death in February 2000 by the Ulster Volunteer Force (UVF), after one of them had allegedly made derogatory remarks about dead UVF Mid-Ulster Brigade leader Richard Jameson. Frazer was confronted in an interview on BBC Radio Ulster about the murders by the father of one of the victims, Paul McIlwaine. During the Smithwick Tribunal (set up to investigate allegations of collusion in the 1989 Jonesborough ambush) it was alleged by a member of Garda Síochána that Frazer was a part of a loyalist paramilitary group called the Red Hand Commando. Frazer denied the allegations, saying they put his life in danger.

Frazer applied for a licence to hold a firearm for his personal protection and was turned down, a chief inspector said, in part because he was known to associate with loyalist paramilitaries.

In 2019, the BBC investigative journalism programme Spotlight reported that Frazer distributed assault rifles and rocket launchers from Ulster Resistance to loyalist paramilitary groups who used them in more than 70 murders. A police report on the activities of the former UDA boss Johnny Adair states he was receiving weapons from Ulster Resistance in the early 1990s and his contact in Ulster Resistance was Frazer.

== FAIR campaign and related activism ==
FAIR, founded by Frazer in 1998, claims to represent the victims of IRA violence in South Armagh. It has been criticised by some for not doing the same for victims of loyalist paramilitary organisations or for those killed by security forces. In the past, Frazer had said of loyalist paramilitary prisoners that "they should never have been locked up in the first place", and that he had "a lot of time for Billy Wright" a loyalist who rejected the Good Friday Agreement. He had also defended security force collusion with loyalist paramilitaries, stating in an interview with Susan McKay: "If you were in the UDR and your brother was shot, are you telling me you wouldn't [pass information on to loyalists]? ... See if a Paki comes from India and kills a Provo? I'm going to shake his hand."

In February 2006, Frazer was an organiser of the Love Ulster parade in Dublin that had to be cancelled due to rioting. In January 2007, Frazer protested outside the Sinn Féin Ard Fheis in Dublin that voted to join policing structures in Northern Ireland. He "expressed outrage at the idea that the 'law-abiding population' would negotiate with terrorists to get them to support democracy, law and order."

In January 2007, Frazer dismissed Police Ombudsman Nuala O'Loan's report into security force collusion with loyalist paramilitaries.

In March 2010, he claimed to have served a civil writ on deputy First Minister Martin McGuinness, of Sinn Féin, seeking damages arising from the killing of Frazer's father by the Provisional IRA. Both Sinn Féin and the courts denied that any such writ had been served, but in June 2010 Frazer announced that he would seek to progress his claim in the High Court. There has since been no report of any such litigation. Frazer had previously picketed McGuinness's home in Derry in 2007 to demand support for calls for Libya to compensate victims of IRA attacks. Accompanied by two men, Frazer attempted to post a letter to the house but was confronted by local residents and verbally abused. When McGuinness stood for election in the 2011 Irish presidential election Frazer announced that he and FAIR would picket the main Sinn Féin election events. He said, "If the people of the South want a terrorist to represent them around the world as their president then heaven help them." In the event, however, no such pickets took place.

In September 2010, the Special EU Programmes Body (SEUPB) revoked all funding to FAIR (more than £800,000 over three years) due to "major failures in the organisation's ability to adhere to the conditions associated with its funding allocation" uncovered following a "thorough audit" of the tendering and administration procedures used by FAIR. In a statement the SEUPB said: "The SEUPB is charged with ensuring the proper use of public money and as such has no option but to revoke all financial assistance, (amounting to approximately £880,000), that has been offered to the organisation... FAIR has been given every opportunity to respond to and address these issues. The decision to revoke and recover all financial assistance given to the project has not been taken lightly, however, given the seriousness of the issues no other recourse is available."

In November 2011, SEUPB announced that it was seeking the return of funding to FAIR and another Markethill victims' group, Saver/Naver. FAIR was asked to return £350,000 while Saver/Naver was asked to return £200,000. Former Ulster Unionist Party (UUP) leader Lord Empey demanded that the conclusions about FAIR's finances be released into the public domain.

In January 2012, Frazer announced a protest march to be held on 25 February through the mainly Catholic south Armagh village of Whitecross, to recall the killing of ten Protestant workmen by the South Armagh Republican Action Force in January 1976 in the Kingsmill massacre. He also named individuals whom he accused of responsibility for the massacre. Frazer later announced that the march had been postponed "at the request of the Kingsmills families". A 2011 report by the Historical Enquiries Team (HET) found that members of the Provisional IRA carried out the attack despite the organisation being on ceasefire.

A delegation including Frazer, UUP politician Danny Kennedy and relatives of the Kingsmill families travelled to Dublin in September 2012 to seek an apology from the Taoiseach, Enda Kenny. The apology was being sought for what they described as the Irish government's "blatant inaction" over the Kingmills killings. The Taoiseach said he couldn't apologise for the actions of the IRA but assured the families there was no hierarchy for victims and their concerns were just as important as any other victims' families. The families expressed disappointment although Frazer stated he was pleased to have met the Taoiseach.

On 16 November 2012 Frazer announced that he was stepping down as director of FAIR, after he had reviewed a copy of the SEUPB audit report which, he claimed, showed no grounds for demanding the reimbursement of funding. He added "I will still be working in the victims sector."

== Political career ==
In addition to his advocacy for Protestant victims, Frazer contested several elections in County Armagh. He was not elected, and on most occasions lost his deposit. He ran as an Ulster Independence Movement candidate in the 1996 Forum Elections and the 1998 Assembly elections, and as an independent in the 2003 Assembly elections and a council by-election.

Frazer's best electoral showing was 1,427 votes, 25.9%, in a Newry and Mourne District Council by-election in August 2006, when Frazer had the backing of the local UUP and Democratic Unionist Party (DUP). The total votes polled 5,587 (47.6% of the local electorate); it was a two-candidate race for the Fews Area between Frazer and Sinn Féin candidate Turlough Murphy. The combined unionist vote in 2005 in the area had been 2,446.

In the 2010 UK general election, Frazer contested the Newry and Armagh Parliamentary constituency as an independent candidate. He received 656 votes (1.5%). The seat was retained by Sinn Féin's Conor Murphy who received 18,857 votes.

In the 2011 Assembly elections he was listed as a subscriber for the Traditional Unionist Voice candidate for the Newry and Armagh constituency, Barrie Halliday who secured 1.8% of the vote. At Newry Crown Court on Wednesday, June 21, 2017, Pastor Barrie Gordon Halliday was sentenced to nine months in prison, suspended for eighteen months, when he pleaded guilty to seventeen counts of VAT repayment fraud.

In November 2012, Frazer announced his intention to contest the 2013 Mid Ulster by-election necessitated by Martin McGuinness's decision to resign the parliamentary seat to concentrate on his Assembly role. Frazer was quoted in The Irish News in January 2013 as stating that he would not condemn any paramilitary gunman who shot McGuinness.

Despite his earlier advocacy of Ulster nationalism, in 2013 Frazer declared himself in favour of re-establishing direct rule in Northern Ireland.

On 24 April 2013, Frazer and others, including former British National Party fundraiser Jim Dowson and David Nicholl, a former member of the paramilitary-linked Ulster Democratic Party, announced the launch of a new political party called the Protestant Coalition.

== Other activities ==
In 2004 Frazer invited to South Armagh Larry Pratt of Gun Owners of America, an advocate of the American militia movement, who had admitted links with "the Ku Klux Klan and an Aryan Nation official".

Frazer came to wider attention in October 2005 when he got into a public argument with a Redemptorist priest, Father Alec Reid. Frazer made remarks that Catholics had butchered Protestants during the Troubles. Father Reid likened unionist treatment of Catholics to the treatment of the Jews by the Nazis. Reid later apologised for the remark, saying he had lost his temper. Frazer reported Reid to the police for incitement to hatred, but no legal action ensued.

In October 2011 he attended a protest in Pomeroy against the use of rubble from a demolished police station to level out the playing field of the local GAA club, which hosts an annual tug-of-war event in memory of Seamus Woods, an IRA member killed by the premature explosion of a mortar while attacking the station. The station was the target of many such IRA attacks during the Troubles. Frazer stated that "moving the rubble to the GAA club would cause a lot of heartache for many families. The unionist population is small in Pomeroy and they certainly feel betrayed."

In November 2011, after an apology by UUP MLA John McCallister for "unionist failings" in the past (at a Sinn Féin conference in Newry), Frazer reacted furiously. Frazer stated that people were "appalled" by McCallister's remarks.

In May 2012, after seeing the Italian flag being flown as part of a cultural event held in Donaghmore's St Patrick's Primary School and mistaking it for the Irish Tricolour, Frazer accused the school for 4-to-11-year-old children of being "the junior headquarters of SF/IRA youth", stating on Facebook that "I wounder do they also train the children in how to use weapons, for it seems they can do what they wont."(sic) Concerned for the safety of students and the school's reputation, teachers informed police of the accusations and photographs of the school posted by Frazer were later removed from Facebook.

Frazer expressed outrage after his car was stopped and searched by the PSNI in October 2012 under anti-terror laws. He announced his intention to report the incident to his solicitor and the Police Ombudsman. The incident occurred outside Whitecross and Frazer's wallet and documents were taken away for examination. Unknown to police, he made a voice recording on his mobile phone. He had taken photos of the cars the police were in but police removed the camera from Frazer and deleted the images. Police provided no explanation to Frazer as to why the stop and search procedure was undertaken.

Following the 2013 horse meat scandal Frazer gave an interview to The University Times in which he claimed horse meat had actually been introduced to the food chain by the IRA five years before the scandal broke. He also claimed that republicans were behind "old fat cows that are 30 months old" being sold for food before adding that "a blind eye has been turned to it" and that "this is the kind of thing that's going on that we're sick of".

In September 2013 an illegal mobile abattoir was found in Newry. William stated that his "IRA horse burger" claims were now vindicated. In March 2014 more illegal abattoirs where found by the FSA in Forkhill and Bessbrook.

Frazer's car was set on fire at his home outside Markethill in the early hours of 10 February 2013. Frazer stated that he was asleep inside the house at the time. A passing police patrol noticed the fire but the car was destroyed. Frazer blamed republicans for the incident and claimed to have received a death threat a few hours before the attack. Frazer posted photos to his Facebook page reportedly showing a bullet that was posted to him, however it was pointed out by the satirical web group LAD that the handwriting on the envelope was the same as his own and that the envelope lacked a sorting office stamp.

In September 2013, when brought before court under the serious crime act of 2007, Frazer arrived to court dressed as radical Muslim cleric and terrorist, Abu Hamza al-Masri. He claimed that this was an act of protest, as the legislation he was being charged under was one he believed to be designed for the conviction of Muslim extremists, and therefore should not have applied to him.

In 2014 Frazer attacked the BBC for having a supposed Gaelic Athletic Association top on the soap EastEnders and that "it glorified terrorism" and the IRA. The top in question turned out to be a PE top from a Ballymena school. When asked if he wanted to apologise for the mistake he refused.

In 2014 Frazer and the Protestant Coalition led a campaign against a teacher at the Boy's Model School when it was revealed she was a member of Sinn Féin, justifying their stance that due to her politics she should not be teaching at the school. She left after weeks of abuse. In November 2015 he warned of leading a protest at Belfast International Airport, due to a perceived lack of Northern Ireland branded gifts and souvenirs for sale at the airport compared to products advertised as being Irish or from Ireland.

=== Flag protests ===
On 3 January 2013 Frazer said that he had contacted the Garda Síochána to inform them that he and some followers would hold a protest in Dublin over the decision by Belfast City Council to reduce the number of days the Union Flag flew above Belfast City Hall. Shortly thereafter he became spokesman of the "interim committee" of the Ulster People's Forum, one of a number of loyalist umbrella groups established to co-ordinate the protests.

On 27 February 2013, Frazer was arrested by the PSNI in his home village of Markethill, for questioning in relation to organising and participating in illegal parades and protests which were centred on the flags issue. Jamie Bryson, who along with Frazer was one of the most prominent spokespersons for the flag protesters, was also later arrested in Bangor after going on the run for several days. Frazer was charged with three counts of participating in unnotified public processions and obstruction of traffic in a public place. Frazer was subsequently released on bail. On 16 July 2013, he was rearrested for alleged breach of bail conditions. The charges against Frazer were later dropped.

=== George Galloway's lawsuit ===
In January 2016, George Galloway in the Belfast High Court won leave to sue in the UK the American internet search engine company Google, which owns the internet video posting site YouTube. Material was posted on YouTube by Frazer, who described Galloway as a supporter of terrorist beheadings. Frazer was also being sued. The action is believed to be the first of its kind in Europe.

== Death ==
Frazer died of cancer on 28 June 2019. Traditional Unionist Voice (TUV) leader Jim Allister and DUP Assembly member Jim Wells paid tribute to his memory.

== See also ==
- Andrew Robb and David McIlwaine killings
