= America First Party =

America First Party may refer to:

- America First Party, an isolationist political party founded in 1943 and dissolved in 1947
- America First Party, another name for the Populist Party (United States, 1984)
- America First Party, right-wing political party in Nebraska

== See also ==
- America First Committee, 1940-1941
