= Families Acting for Innocent Relatives =

Families Acting for Innocent Relatives (FAIR) is a non-governmental organisation founded in 1998 in County Armagh, Northern Ireland. Based in Markethill, it describes itself as a "non-sectarian, non-political organisation" that works "in the interests of the innocent victims of terrorism in South Armagh."

== Leadership ==
FAIR was founded, and led until his resignation in November 2012, by Willie Frazer, a South Armagh man who lost five members of his close family to Provisional IRA violence during the Troubles.

Frazer claimed to represent those who feel marginalised by concessions granted to Irish republicans during the Northern Ireland peace process and by the inclusion of Sinn Féin in its government; a party regarded by many as the political wing of the Provisional IRA.

== Political action ==
FAIR opposed the early conditional release of republican militants following the 1998 Belfast Agreement and has called for full public inquiries into alleged collusion between Irish authorities and republicans in the deaths of Royal Ulster Constabulary (RUC) officers, loyalist paramilitaries and Northern Protestant civilians. Representatives of FAIR met with the Smithwick Tribunal for this reason.

Frazer also stated that loyalist paramilitaries – who were also released – "should never have been locked up in the first place."

=== Marches in Dublin ===
In February 2006, FAIR (as part of the Love Ulster organisation) attempted to hold a protest march in Dublin, the capital city of the Republic of Ireland. Their expressed goal was to bring attention to their view of the plight of unionist victims of IRA violence. A riot by protesters against the march resulted in violence between them and the Gardaí, as well as damage to property, and the march did not take place. The Love Ulster supporters withdrew under police cover and were ferried by bus to meet with Irish Justice Minister Michael McDowell. Although Republican Sinn Féin and others were initially accused of orchestrating the riot, these allegations were later dismissed after investigation.

In 2007, FAIR and Love Ulster announced their intention to hold another march in Dublin. These plans were cancelled after a meeting with Irish government officials was offered.

== Controversies ==
Critics have noted that FAIR has named Robert McConnell, a member of the Ulster Defence Regiment, as a victim of IRA violence. McConnell was implicated in both the killing of the brothers of Eugene Reavey on 4 January 1976, and in the Dublin and Monaghan bombings of 1974.

FAIR has also been criticised for supporting Ian Paisley's 1999 allegation that Eugene Reavey was involved in the killing of ten Protestant civilians in the Kingsmill massacre on 5 January 1976. FAIR rejected the dismissal of the allegation against Reavey by Police Service of Northern Ireland (PSNI) Chief Constable Ronnie Flanagan.

In 2007 Peter Robinson, then deputy leader of the Democratic Unionist Party (DUP), wrote to Frazer, telling him he "might find it much easier to get co-operation with political representatives if you were genuinely involved in Victim Support rather than opposition politics".

In May 2010 FAIR's head researcher William Wilkinson was convicted of rape and attempted rape, and was later sentenced to serve seven years in prison. Wilkinson was also a local councillor in Ballymena for the Ulster Unionist Coalition Party. His appeal against conviction was rejected in July 2011.

In February 2010 the Office of the First Minister and Deputy First Minister drew the attention of the body administering FAIR's funding from the Special EU Programmes Body (SEUPB) to the publication on FAIR's website of political material critical of the agreement between the DUP and Sinn Féin on the devolution of policing and justice.

In September 2010 the SEUPB withdrew funding, totalling £880,000, from FAIR. The SEUPB said that this was due to "major failures in the organisation's ability to adhere to the conditions associated with its funding allocation" uncovered following a "thorough audit" of the tendering and administration procedures used by FAIR. It said: "The SEUPB is charged with ensuring the proper use of public money and as such has no option but to revoke all financial assistance, (amounting to approximately £880,000), that has been offered to the organisation... FAIR has been given every opportunity to respond to and address these issues. The decision to revoke and recover all financial assistance given to the project has not been taken lightly, however, given the seriousness of the issues no other recourse is available."

The matter was referred to the PSNI Serious Organised Crime Branch, which a year later stated that the prosecution service had "directed that there was insufficient evidence to show a criminal offence, therefore there will be no prosecution".

On 16 November 2012, after he had reviewed a copy of the SEUPB audit report which had given rise to a demand for the return of £350,000 of funding, Frazer announced that he was stepping down as director of FAIR.
