= 1985 Northern Ireland local elections =

Northern Irish local elections

- 15 May 1985

All council seats
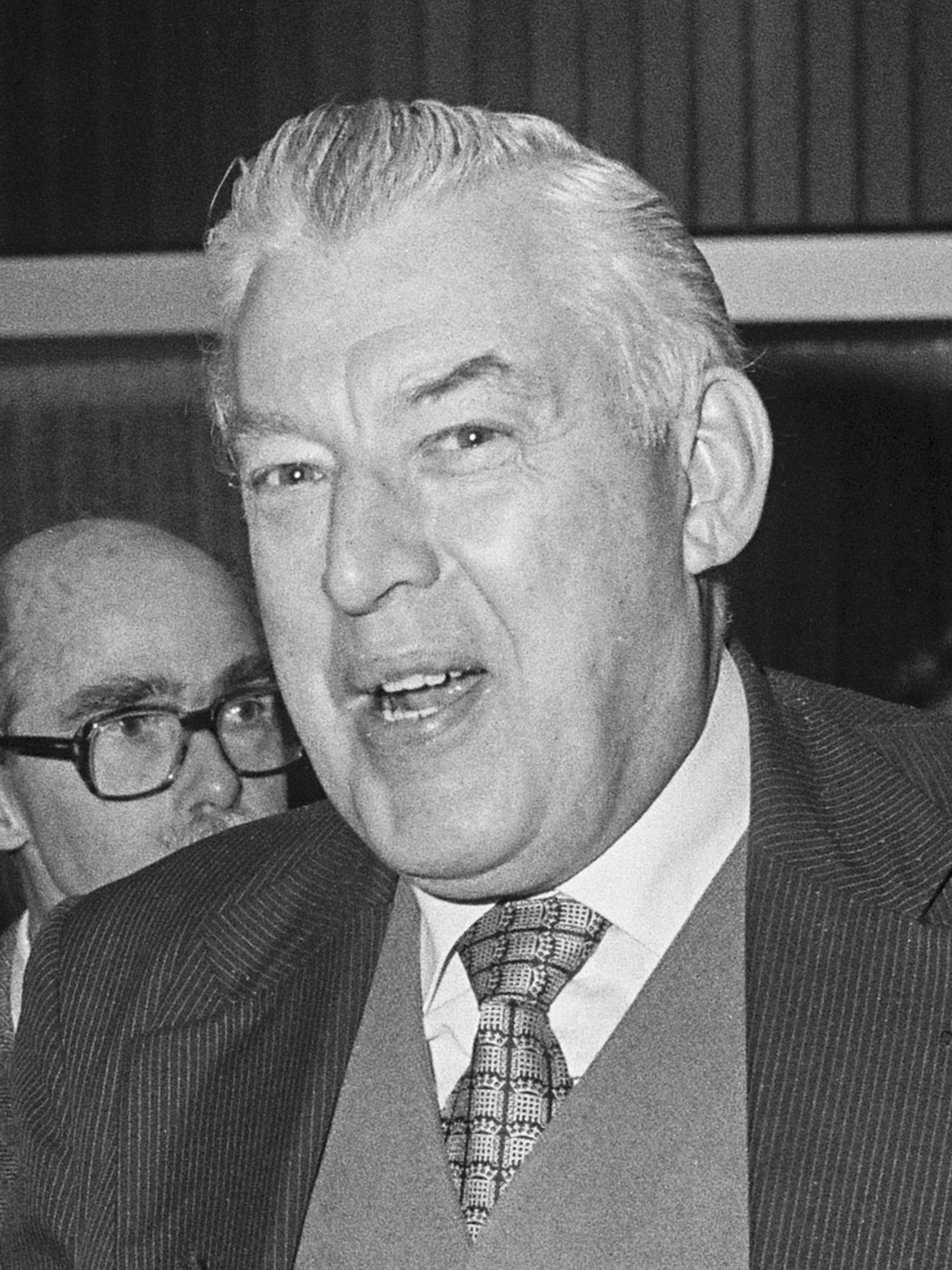

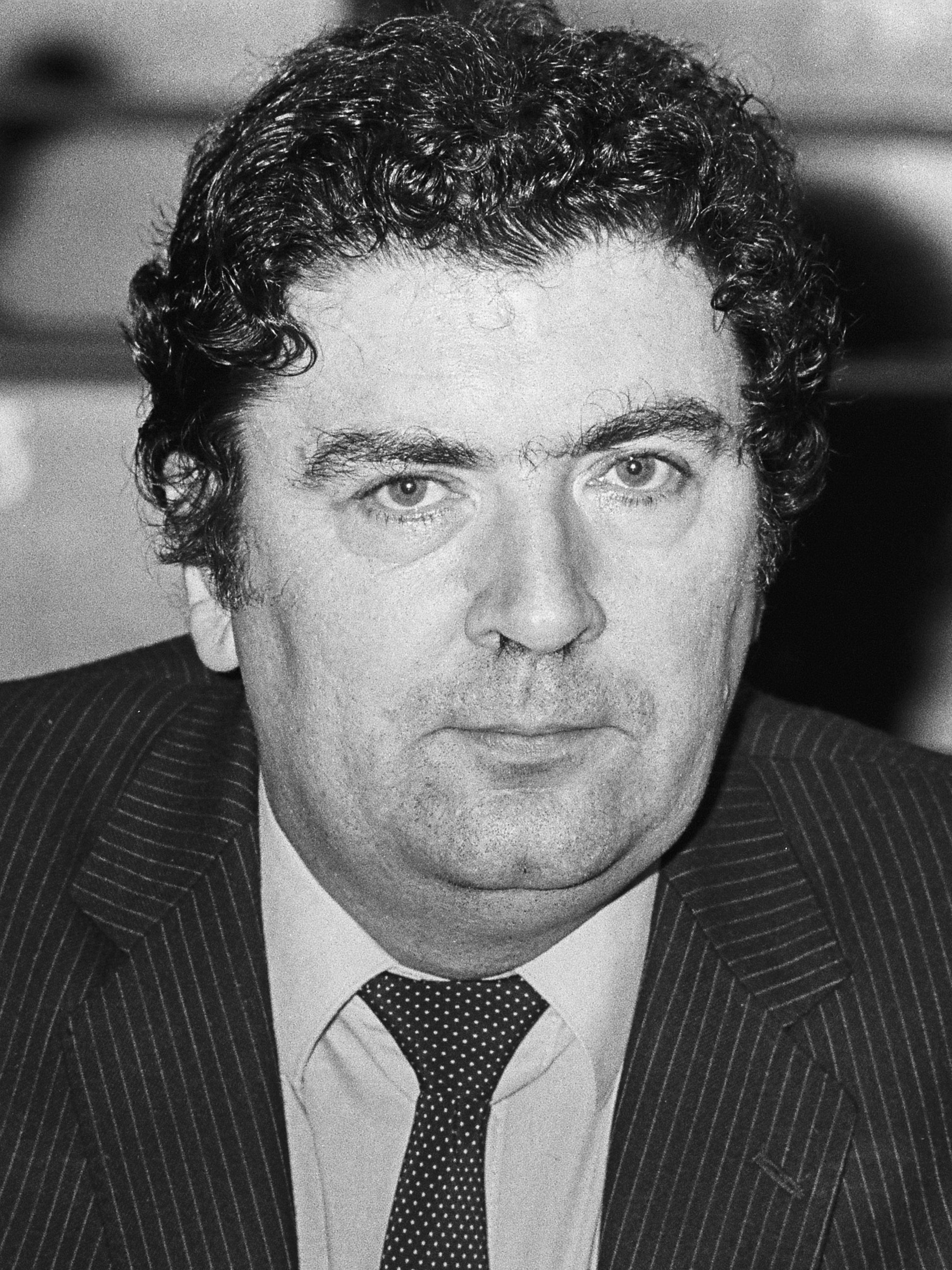

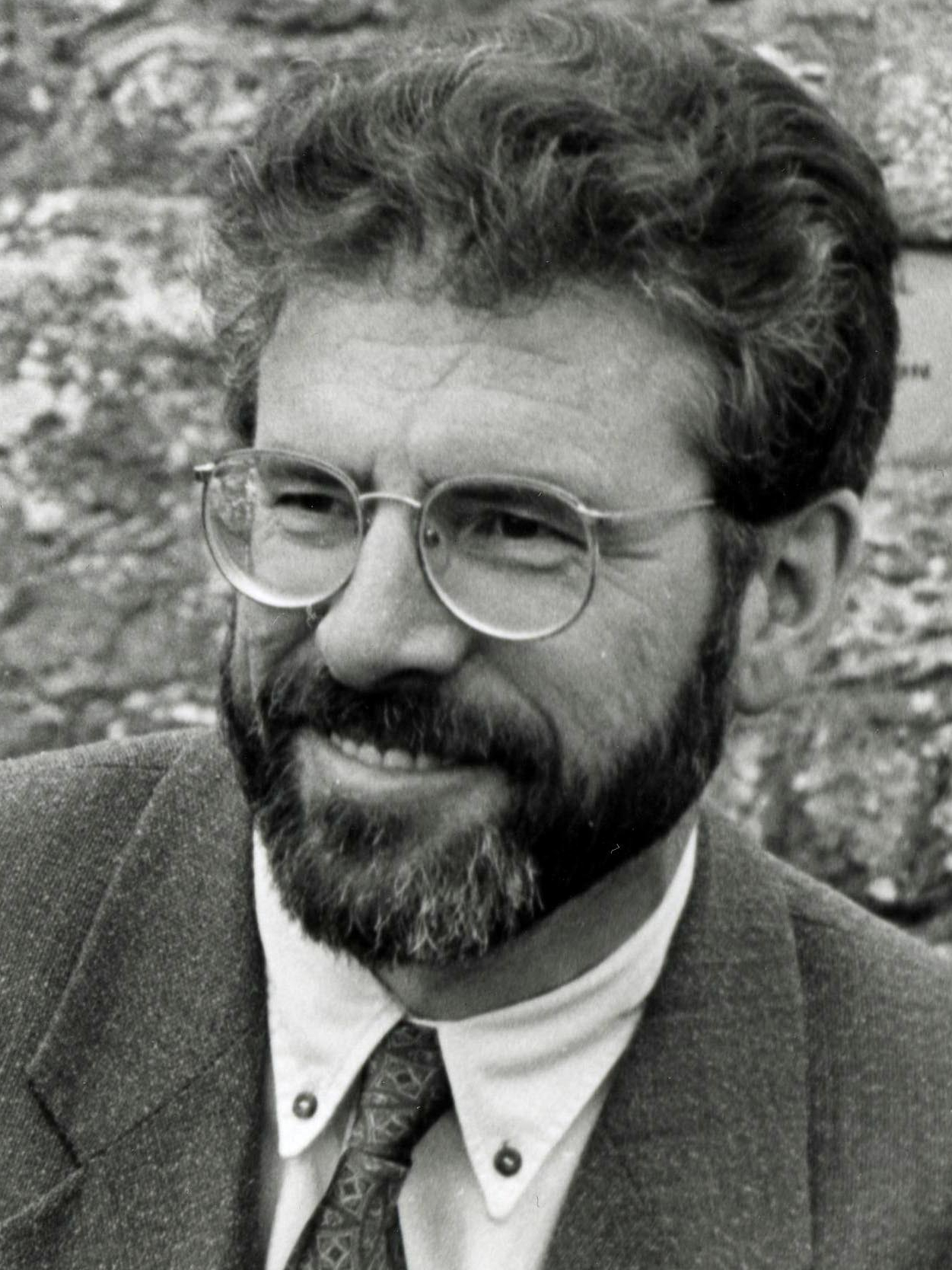

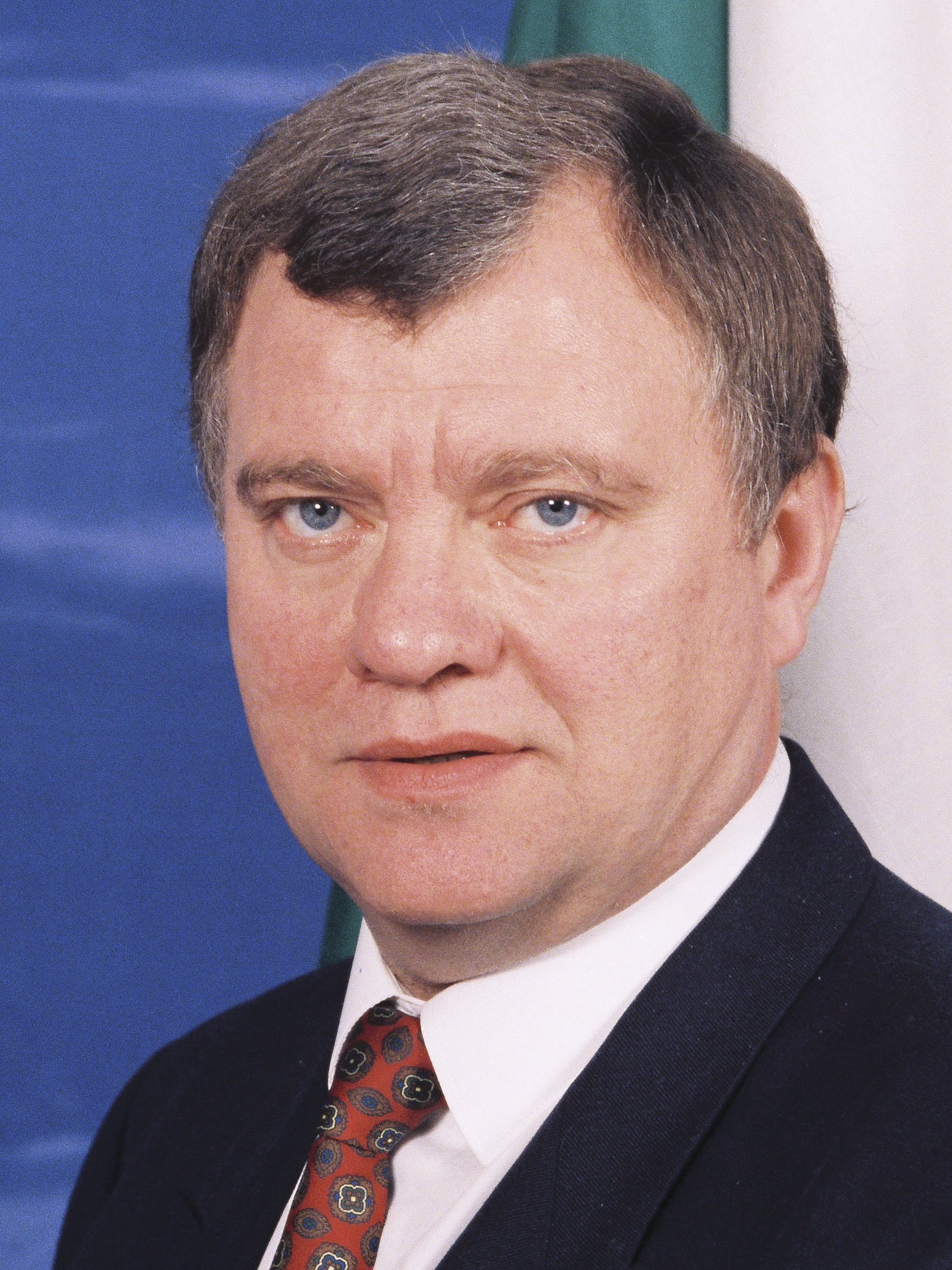

| | First party | Second party | Third party |
|---|---|---|---|
| Leader | James Molyneaux | Ian Paisley | John Hume |
| Party | UUP | DUP | SDLP |
| Seats won | 189 | 142 | 102 |
| Seat change | ▲37 | Steady | ▼2 |
| Popular vote | 188,497 | 155,297 | 113,967 |
| Percentage | 29.5% | 24.3% | 17.8% |
| Swing | ▲3.1% | ▼2.3% | ▲0.3% |
| | Fourth party | Fifth party | Sixth party |
| Leader | Gerry Adams | John Cushnahan | N/A |
| Party | Sinn Féin | Alliance | Independent |
| Seats won | 59 | 34 | 9 |
| Seat change | ▲59 | ▼4 | ▼28 |
| Popular vote | 75,686 | 45,038 | 10,297 |
| Percentage | 11.8% | 7.0% | 1.6% |
| Swing | New party | ▼1.9% | ▼5.1% |
- Colours denote the winning party with outright control

- Colours denote the party with the most seats

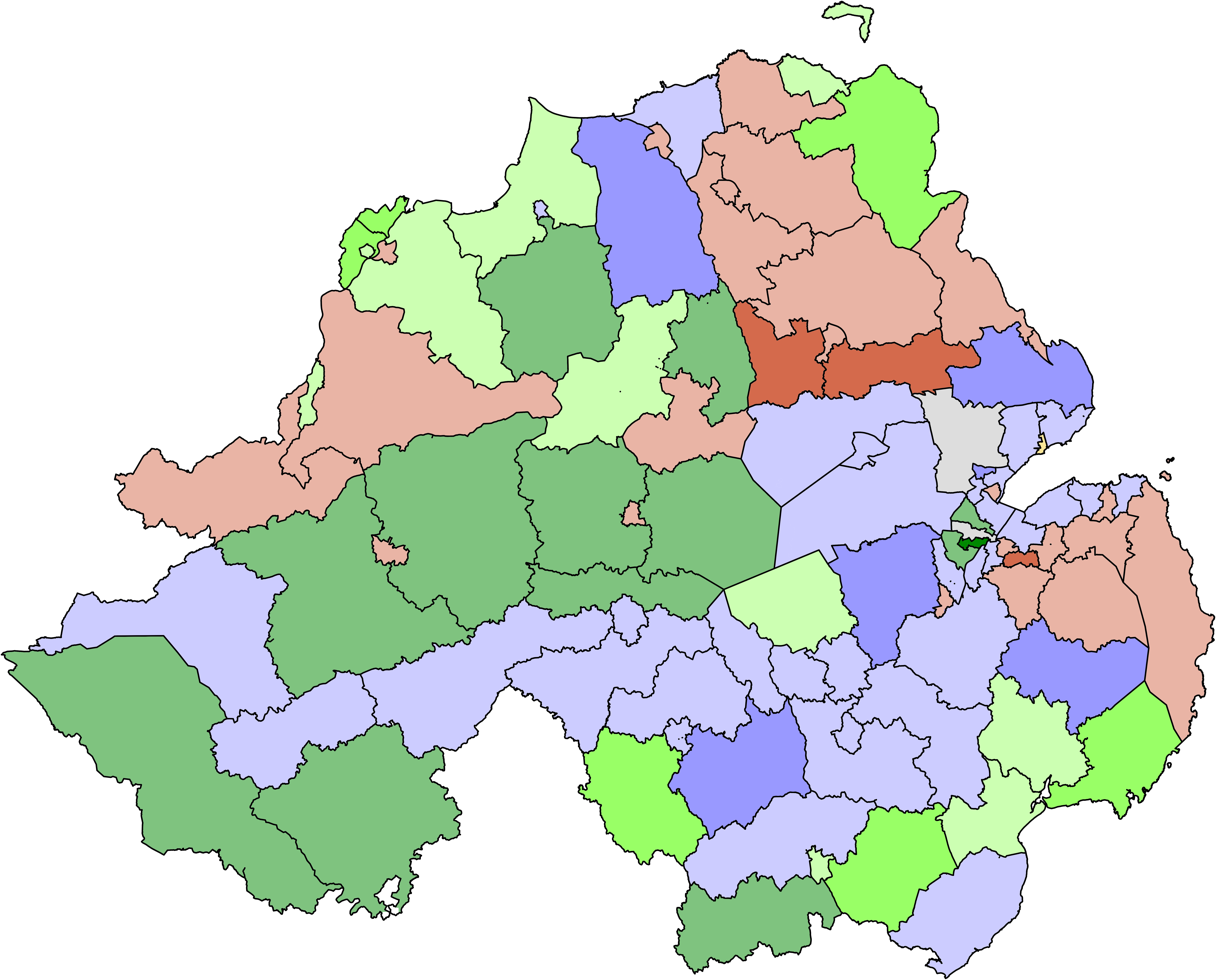
- Colours denote the party with a plurality of votes by District Electoral Area. Darker colour indicates the party had a majority in that DEA.

Elections for local government were held in Northern Ireland on 15 May 1985, contesting 565 seats in all.

== Background ==
=== 1981 elections ===
The previous elections had been fought in the middle of the hunger strike and the H-Block Prison Protest. Those elections had shown changes in party representation, with three parties, namely the Ulster Unionist Party (UUP), the Democratic Unionist Party (DUP) and the Social Democratic and Labour Party (SDLP), winning 75% of the seats. On the Unionist side, the DUP arrived at a position of near parity with the UUP, outpolling the latter by 851 votes, although the UUP managed to win more seats overall. Other changes on the Unionist side saw the disbandment of two smaller Unionist parties: the Unionist Party of Northern Ireland in September 1981 and the United Ulster Unionist Party in May 1984. On the nationalist side, while the SDLP maintained its dominant position, a greater number of elected candidates supporting the H-Block protest were elected. In total 36 candidates endorsed by the H-Block committee were elected of whom 21 belonged to the Irish Independence Party. The representation of the centrist Alliance Party was almost halved as their number of seats was reduced from 70 in 1977 to 38 in 1981.

=== Northern Ireland Assembly and New Ireland Forum ===
Following the end of the Hunger Strike, attention focused on attempts by the new Secretary of State for Northern Ireland, Jim Prior, to restore devolution. This eventually led to the establishment of the Northern Ireland Assembly which was elected in October 1982. However nationalist parties boycotted the forum and the SDLP instead threw its efforts into the New Ireland Forum. This forum, established in May 1983, reported in May 1984 and represented the combined efforts of the nationalist parties to obtain a solution to the constitutional issue. However the report was rejected by British Prime Minister Margaret Thatcher who rejected each of the three proposals with the words "that is out" in a response that became known as the "out, out, out" speech.

=== Sinn Féin ===
The entry into electoral politics of Sinn Féin (SF) became a significant issue in the run up to the elections. SF polled over 10% in the 1982 Assembly election, winning five seats. At the 1983 Westminster election, the party increased their vote share to 13.4% and maintained that level of support in the 1984 European election. The party won their first council seat in a by-election in March 1983, with Seamus Kerr polling 60% in Omagh 'Area D' This was followed by the election of Alex Maskey and Sean McKnight to Belfast City Council in June 1983 and February 1984 respectively. In Dungannon and Fermanagh, independent councillors Seamus Cassidy and John Joe McCusker joined SF.

Prior's successor as Secretary of State, Douglas Hurd, refused to ban SF and also rejected calls by unionists for an anti-violence declaration to be signed by all candidates.

=== Rates ===
The expansion of services, particularly leisure began to have an impact in rates at a time when the Rate Support Grant was being cut. The grant was reduced by 1% in 1985. Belfast Leisure Services in particular accounted for 22.7% of the City budget. Rates overall had risen by 8% in the financial year from 1984 to 1985, a figure above the rate of inflation and resulted in the cancellation of a proposed ice rink in Belfast, while that in Bangor had to receive private funding. Since the 1980–1981 financial year, rates had risen by 51.7% ranging from a 17.9% rise in Castlereagh to 80% rises in Omagh and Newry and Mourne.

== Legislation ==
=== Boundaries ===
The Local Government (N.I.) Act 1972, Section 50 (1) required a review of local government boundaries and electoral areas in 1981, however it was not until 28 October 1982 that Prior reappointed Sir F. Harrison, who had conducted the previous review in 1971 and 1972. Provisional recommendations were published on 20 May 1983. These led to additional representations and nineteen public hearings before revised recommendations were published on 18 January 1984. Following six further public hearings, the final report was sent to the Secretary of State on 29 May 1984.

The report recommended no change in the number of councils or their names. The number of wards was increased from 526 to 566. Moyle was the only council to lose a ward.

With the wards drawn the government decided that a new procedure would be used to group them together to form District Electoral Areas (DEA). In 1972 the wards had been grouped together into areas of four to eight wards with each area electing a number of councillors equal to the number of wards that it contained. This had been done by the Chief Electoral Officer, a fact that had been criticised for potentially affecting his impartiality.

The District Electoral Areas Commissioner (N.I.) Order was laid before Parliament on 15 December 1983. This provided for the appointment of a commissioner and set him the task of creating electoral areas containing five to seven members. These were to have names rather than an alphabetic designation as before. The debate over the Order in January and February 1984 centred on the merits of STV, the narrower number of councillors in each DEA and the names issue. Unionists argued for DEAs electing four to six councillors.

== Results ==
=== Overall ===
| Party | Councillors | | Votes | |
| Party | Total | +/- | % share | Total |
|---|---|---|---|---|
| UUP | 189 | +37 | 29.5 | 188,497 |
| DUP | 142 | 0 | 24.3 | 155,297 |
| SDLP | 102 | -2 | 17.8 | 113,967 |
| Sinn Féin | 59 | N/A | 11.8 | 75,686 |
| Alliance | 34 | -4 | 7.0 | 45,038 |
| Independent | 9 | -28 | 1.6 | 10,297 |
| Ind. Unionist | 8 | +6 | 1.3 | 8,780 |
| Ind. Nationalist | 6 | +6 | 1.2 | 7,597 |
| Workers' Party | 4 | +1 | 1.6 | 10,415 |
| Irish Independence | 4 | -17 | 1.2 | 7,459 |
| UPUP | 3 | -2 | 0.5 | 3,139 |
| PUP | 2 | +1 | 0.6 | 3,612 |
| Campaign for Human and Animal Rights | 1 | +1 | 0.5 | 2,970 |
| NI Labour | 1 | 0 | 0.2 | 1,285 |
| Labour Party NI | 0 | N/A | 0.2 | 1,029 |
| Newtownabbey Labour | 1 | 0 | 0.1 | 792 |
| Ulster Democratic | 0 | N/A | 0.1 | 782 |
| Labour and Trade Union | 0 | N/A | 0.1 | 556 |
| Independent Democratic Unionist | 0 | N/A | 0.1 | 429 |
| Ecology | 0 | 0 | 0.1 | 387 |
| Irish Republican Socialist | 0 | -2 | 0.0 | 276 |
| Communist | 0 | 0 | 0.0 | 245 |
| All Night Party | 0 | N/A | 0.0 | 235 |
| Ind. Republican | 0 | 0 | 0.0 | 187 |
| People's Democracy | 0 | -2 | 0.0 | 131 |
| Independent Workers' Party | 0 | N/A | 0.0 | 113 |
| Ulster Liberal | 0 | N/A | 0.0 | 35 |
| Independent Labour | 0 | -1 | 0.0 | 30 |

=== By council ===
==== Antrim ====
Antrim North West
| Party | Candidate | 1st Pref |
|---|---|---|
| UUP | James Graham | 1,164 |
| DUP | Wilson Clyde | 871 |
| SDLP | Robert Loughran | 786 |
| Sinn Féin | Henry Cushinan | 675 |
| SDLP | James Laverty | 475 |
| UUP | Jack Blakely | 259 |
| Irish Independence | John Heffron | 235 |
| DUP | Samuel Hall | 187 |
| UUP | Roderick Swann | 123 |
| Alliance | John Wallace | 107 |
| Turnout | | 4,970 |

Antrim South East
| Party | Candidate | 1st Pref |
|---|---|---|
| DUP | Roy Thompson | 1,207 |
| UUP | Edgar Wallace | 768 |
| SDLP | Robert Burns | 760 |
| DUP | Samuel Dunlop | 687 |
| UUP | Carol Cunningham | 630 |
| UUP | Howard Campbell | 549 |
| UUP | Mervyn Rea | 376 |
| UUP | James Robinson | 349 |
| Alliance | John McCourt | 303 |
| Alliance | Theresa Gallagher | 220 |
| DUP | William McCormick | 202 |
| Turnout | | 6,165 |

Antrim Town
| Party | Candidate | 1st Pref |
|---|---|---|
| UUP | Jack Allen | 872 |
| SDLP | Oran Keenan | 670 |
| UUP | Frederick Marks | 642 |
| DUP | Margaret Brown | 433 |
| DUP | Charles Quinn | 403 |
| DUP | Adam McKee | 280 |
| Alliance | James McConnell | 266 |
| UUP | Andrew Thompson | 163 |
| Alliance | Mary Wallace | 145 |
| Alliance | James Williamson | 109 |
| UUP | Roy Stinson | 100 |
| Workers' Party | Robert Owens | 63 |
| Turnout | | 4,284 |

==== Ards ====
Ards Peninsula
| Party | Candidate | 1st Pref |
|---|---|---|
| UPUP | Gladys McIntyre | 999 |
| DUP | Jim Shannon | 837 |
| UUP | Robert Ambrose | 837 |
| DUP | Oliver Johnston | 811 |
| Independent | Thomas Byers | 808 |
| DUP | Joseph Thompson | 637 |
| UUP | John Shields | 609 |
| Alliance | Kieran McCarthy | 454 |
| UUP | John Scott | 416 |
| SDLP | Patrick Doherty | 359 |
| Alliance | James Muirhead | 287 |
| UUP | Samuel McKeown | 158 |
| SDLP | Seamus O'Neill | 89 |
| Turnout | | 7,521 |

Ards West
| Party | Candidate | 1st Pref |
|---|---|---|
| DUP | Thomas Gourley | 1,493 |
| UUP | Robert Gibson | 1,483 |
| Alliance | Thomas McBriar | 799 |
| UUP | Stanley McCoy | 631 |
| DUP | John Hamilton | 589 |
| DUP | Bobby McBride | 558 |
| Alliance | Alan McDowell | 248 |
| UUP | Trevor Hussey | 172 |
| UUP | Arthur Spence | 131 |
| Independent | Johnston Haire | 43 |
| Turnout | | 6,290 |

Newtownards
| Party | Candidate | 1st Pref |
|---|---|---|
| DUP | Simpson Gibson | 1,596 |
| NI Labour | Robert Gaw | 1,156 |
| DUP | John Elliott | 1,026 |
| UUP | Tom Benson | 990 |
| Alliance | Owen Dorrian | 549 |
| UUP | David Smyth | 517 |
| DUP | Joseph Patterson | 280 |
| DUP | William Gilmore | 242 |
| UUP | David Jeffers | 237 |
| Alliance | Laurence Thompson | 200 |
| Labour Party NI | Hugh McMullan | 188 |
| UUP | James McKernon | 76 |
| Ulster Liberal | Michael McGuigan | 35 |
| Turnout | | 7,249 |

==== Armagh ====
Armagh City
| Party | Candidate | 1st Pref |
|---|---|---|
| Sinn Féin | Thomas Carroll | 970 |
| DUP | Geoffrey Knipe | 756 |
| SDLP | John Agnew | 739 |
| UUP | John Doogan | 645 |
| Ind. Nationalist | Barney McManus | 640 |
| UUP | George MacCartney | 620 |
| SDLP | Pat Brannigan | 612 |
| UUP | Robert Orr | 564 |
| SDLP | Oliver Tobin | 476 |
| Turnout | | 6,122 |

Crossmore
| Party | Candidate | 1st Pref |
|---|---|---|
| SDLP | Charles Mallon | 1,072 |
| UUP | Jim Nicholson | 949 |
| SDLP | James McKernan | 889 |
| SDLP | Thomas McArdle | 837 |
| DUP | Robert McBride | 524 |
| UUP | Thomas Shilliday | 513 |
| Turnout | | 4,921 |

Cusher
| Party | Candidate | 1st Pref |
|---|---|---|
| UUP | Eric Speers | 1,267 |
| SDLP | Seamus Mallon | 1,260 |
| UUP | Thomas Johnston | 1,149 |
| DUP | Thomas Black | 1,009 |
| UUP | James Clayton | 939 |
| UUP | Robert Turner | 901 |
| DUP | Mervyn Spratt | 329 |
| Turnout | | 7,134 |

The Orchard
| Party | Candidate | 1st Pref |
|---|---|---|
| UUP | Jim Speers | 1,189 |
| DUP | Douglas Hutchinson | 1,150 |
| UUP | Ronald Allen | 875 |
| UUP | Samuel Foster | 676 |
| SDLP | Christopher McAnallen | 612 |
| SDLP | Francis McIlvanna | 579 |
| Sinn Féin | Brigid McCartan | 545 |
| Turnout | | 5,718 |

==== Ballymena ====
Ballymena Town
| Party | Candidate | 1st Pref |
|---|---|---|
| SDLP | Patrick McAvoy | 1,126 |
| Ind. Unionist | Samuel Henry | 876 |
| UUP | Robert Coulter | 794 |
| DUP | Maurice Mills | 708 |
| DUP | Richard McKeown | 640 |
| DUP | Robert Maternaghan | 563 |
| DUP | John Wilson | 538 |
| UUP | Gordon Wilson | 403 |
| Ind. Unionist | James Alexander | 328 |
| UUP | Warren Wray | 282 |
| SDLP | Malachy Reynolds | 241 |
| Turnout | | 6,604 |

Braid Valley
| Party | Candidate | 1st Pref |
|---|---|---|
| Independent | James Woulahan | 856 |
| UUP | Desmond Armstrong | 757 |
| DUP | Samuel Hanna | 746 |
| DUP | John Porter | 724 |
| DUP | William Armstrong | 628 |
| UUP | Margaret Alexander | 626 |
| UUP | Stewart McCullough | 490 |
| DUP | Samuel Martin | 474 |
| Turnout | | 5,411 |

Kells Water
| Party | Candidate | 1st Pref |
|---|---|---|
| UUP | William Brownlees | 856 |
| DUP | John McAuley | 845 |
| DUP | Roy West | 796 |
| DUP | Martin Clarke | 695 |
| DUP | David McClintock | 615 |
| DUP | Charles Maternaghan | 577 |
| UUP | Victoria Brownlees | 410 |
| Turnout | | 4,927 |

The Main
| Party | Candidate | 1st Pref |
|---|---|---|
| DUP | Roy Gillespie | 1,076 |
| DUP | Thomas Nicholl | 960 |
| UUP | John Johnston | 812 |
| DUP | Sandy Spence | 796 |
| UUP | William Wright | 760 |
| DUP | Hubert Nicholl | 633 |
| Turnout | | 5,250 |

==== Ballymoney ====
Ballymoney Town
| Party | Candidate | 1st Pref |
|---|---|---|
| Independent | Robert McComb | 687 |
| UUP | James Simpson | 453 |
| DUP | Cecil Cousley | 424 |
| DUP | Kenneth Blair | 380 |
| DUP | Ralph Stronge | 289 |
| UUP | Adam McNeilly | 274 |
| UUP | James McKeown | 233 |
| Turnout | | 2,803 |

Bann Valley
| Party | Candidate | 1st Pref |
|---|---|---|
| DUP | James Patterson | 669 |
| SDLP | Malachy McCamphill | 550 |
| Sinn Féin | Margaret Hogan | 532 |
| UUP | Joe Gaston | 502 |
| UUP | Kenneth Bamford | 487 |
| DUP | Robert Wilson | 484 |
| DUP | Robert Halliday | 473 |
| Alliance | Hugh McFarland | 248 |
| Turnout | | 4,002 |

Bushvale
| Party | Candidate | 1st Pref |
|---|---|---|
| DUP | Charles Steele | 570 |
| DUP | William Gracey | 557 |
| UUP | John Ramsay | 504 |
| SDLP | Harry Connolly | 445 |
| UUP | William Logan | 433 |
| SDLP | John Mulholland | 230 |
| DUP | Bertie McIlhatton | 198 |
| Ecology | William Hartin | 35 |
| Turnout | | 3,043 |

==== Banbridge ====
Banbridge Town
| Party | Candidate | 1st Pref |
|---|---|---|
| DUP | James Wells | 912 |
| UUP | Archie McKelvey | 889 |
| UUP | Joan Baird | 811 |
| SDLP | James Walsh | 630 |
| UUP | Ivan Gault | 560 |
| DUP | Gareth Bennett | 392 |
| Independent | Leslie Mathews | 364 |
| SDLP | James Smyth | 318 |
| Alliance | Francis McQuaid | 234 |
| Turnout | | 5,191 |

Dromore
| Party | Candidate | 1st Pref |
|---|---|---|
| DUP | Brian Biggerstaff | 923 |
| UUP | Robert Barr | 859 |
| UUP | Robert Hill | 645 |
| UUP | William Martin | 573 |
| SDLP | Bernard Rice | 470 |
| SDLP | Catherine McDermott | 464 |
| DUP | Robert McIlroy | 418 |
| UUP | James McRoberts | 354 |
| DUP | Robert McGregor | 207 |
| Turnout | | 5,029 |

Knockiveagh
| Party | Candidate | 1st Pref |
|---|---|---|
| DUP | Wilfred McFadden | 766 |
| UUP | Raymond McCullough | 753 |
| UUP | Samuel Cowan | 725 |
| Independent | Laurence McCartan | 694 |
| UUP | Herbert Heslip | 510 |
| SDLP | Peter McGreevy | 510 |
| SDLP | Helen Stewart | 395 |
| UUP | William Hamilton | 343 |
| DUP | Elizabeth McDowell | 157 |
| Turnout | | 4,941 |

==== Belfast ====
Balmoral
| Party | Candidate | 1st Pref |
|---|---|---|
| UUP | Margaret Crooks | 2,438 |
| UUP | Jim Kirkpatrick | 1,820 |
| DUP | Billy Dickson | 1,638 |
| SDLP | Dorita Field | 1,332 |
| Alliance | John Montgomery | 1,326 |
| UUP | James Stewart | 1,071 |
| Alliance | David Cook | 1,042 |
| DUP | Joan Parkes | 998 |
| DUP | Clarke Gibson | 620 |
| Labour Party NI | Stanley Graham | 186 |
| Workers' Party | Shaun McKeown | 133 |
| Ind. Unionist | Victor Brennan | 127 |
| Ind. Unionist | William Stevenson | 56 |
| Turnout | | 13,102 |

Castle
| Party | Candidate | 1st Pref |
|---|---|---|
| UUP | John Carson | 3,153 |
| SDLP | Alban Maginness | 1,977 |
| Ind. Unionist | Frank Millar | 1,623 |
| DUP | Nigel Dodds | 1,502 |
| UUP | Alfred Redpath | 1,107 |
| Alliance | Tom Campbell | 799 |
| DUP | Michael Whittley | 706 |
| Ind. Unionist | William Gault | 674 |
| SDLP | John Murphy | 579 |
| Alliance | Robert Jamison | 449 |
| Workers' Party | Katherine Johnston | 444 |
| Turnout | | 13,391 |

Court
| Party | Candidate | 1st Pref |
|---|---|---|
| Protestant Unionist | George Seawright | 2,970 |
| PUP | Hugh Smyth | 1,761 |
| DUP | Frederick Ashby | 1,420 |
| UUP | Herbert Ditty | 1,197 |
| Ind. Unionist | Joe Coggle | 894 |
| UUP | Fred Cobain | 804 |
| Alliance | William Dukelow | 626 |
| UUP | James Sands | 624 |
| DUP | William Baxter | 572 |
| Ulster Democratic | Samuel Doyle | 536 |
| Sinn Féin | Harry Fitzsimmons | 432 |
| DUP | Robert Morrow | 182 |
| Workers' Party | Peter Cullen | 157 |
| Turnout | | 12,547 |

Laganbank
| Party | Candidate | 1st Pref |
|---|---|---|
| UUP | William Blair | 1,969 |
| Alliance | William McDowell | 1,425 |
| DUP | Rhonda Paisley | 1,325 |
| SDLP | Alasdair McDonnell | 1,175 |
| DUP | Raymond McCrea | 1,102 |
| SDLP | Gerard McGettrick | 833 |
| UUP | Dixie Gilmore | 727 |
| Sinn Féin | Michael Conlon | 614 |
| UUP | Robert Wilson | 604 |
| Workers' Party | Gerard Carr | 550 |
| Alliance | Dan McGuinness | 434 |
| Labour and Trade Union | Robert Millar | 100 |
| NI Labour | John King | 73 |
| Communist | Michael Morrissey | 57 |
| Turnout | | 11,285 |

Lower Falls
| Party | Candidate | 1st Pref |
|---|---|---|
| SDLP | Joe Hendron | 2,606 |
| Sinn Féin | Seán McKnight | 1,939 |
| Sinn Féin | Sean Keenan | 1,752 |
| Sinn Féin | Elizabeth Fitzsimons | 1,595 |
| Sinn Féin | Fra McCann | 1,467 |
| Workers' Party | Mary McMahon | 1,115 |
| Alliance | Will Glendinning | 1,113 |
| SDLP | Sean Mullen | 159 |
| Communist | Desmond Murray | 67 |
| Turnout | | 12,263 |

Oldpark
| Party | Candidate | 1st Pref |
|---|---|---|
| UUP | Fred Proctor | 1,800 |
| Sinn Féin | Bobby Lavery | 1,752 |
| Sinn Féin | Gerard McGuigan | 1,570 |
| SDLP | Brian Feeney | 1,516 |
| Workers' Party | Seamus Lynch | 1,344 |
| DUP | Peter Lunn | 958 |
| SDLP | Patrick Hunter | 787 |
| Sinn Féin | Paddy McManus | 774 |
| Ind. Unionist | Nelson McCausland | 717 |
| UUP | David Smylie | 707 |
| DUP | Pauline Whittley | 604 |
| Alliance | Arnold Carton | 535 |
| Labour Party NI | Paddy Devlin | 472 |
| PUP | Patrick Bird | 433 |
| Ecology | Peter Emerson | 308 |
| Turnout | | 14,748 |

Pottinger
| Party | Candidate | 1st Pref |
|---|---|---|
| DUP | Sammy Wilson | 2,454 |
| DUP | Frank Leslie | 2,224 |
| UUP | Margaret Clarke | 1,999 |
| DUP | Jim Walker | 1,153 |
| UUP | Reg Empey | 1,117 |
| Alliance | Mervyn Jones | 1,019 |
| Sinn Féin | Joe O'Donnell | 566 |
| UUP | Harry Fletcher | 431 |
| PUP | David Ervine | 394 |
| SDLP | Carmel Maginness | 340 |
| Workers' Party | Frank Cullen | 303 |
| Labour and Trade Union | Stan Dempsey | 218 |
| Communist | James Stewart | 61 |
| Turnout | | 12,785 |

Upper Falls
| Party | Candidate | 1st Pref |
|---|---|---|
| SDLP | Alex Attwood | 2,461 |
| Sinn Féin | Alex Maskey | 2,329 |
| Sinn Féin | Teresa Holland | 2,256 |
| SDLP | Cormac Boomer | 1,655 |
| Sinn Féin | Máirtín Ó Muilleoir | 1,031 |
| Alliance | Pip Glendinning | 931 |
| Workers' Party | Gerald McCann | 386 |
| DUP | Irene Lewis | 372 |
| Labour and Trade Union | Michael Duffy | 238 |
| People's Democracy | John McAnulty | 131 |
| SDLP | Peter Prendiville | 72 |
| Communist | Kevin McCorry | 60 |
| Turnout | | 13,052 |

Victoria
| Party | Candidate | 1st Pref |
|---|---|---|
| DUP | Wallace Browne | 3,447 |
| UUP | Tommy Patton | 2,390 |
| Alliance | Oliver Napier | 2,309 |
| UUP | William Corry | 1,838 |
| UUP | Dorothy Dunlop | 1,365 |
| Alliance | George Thompson | 1,278 |
| DUP | Samuel Walker | 1,131 |
| UUP | John McCrea | 1,002 |
| DUP | Robin Newton | 564 |
| SDLP | Barry Gilheany | 188 |
| Turnout | | 15,939 |

==== Carrickfergus ====
Carrick Castle
| Party | Candidate | 1st Pref |
|---|---|---|
| Alliance | Sean Neeson | 1,005 |
| DUP | Victor Fleming | 477 |
| UUP | Samuel McCamley | 433 |
| UUP | Robert English | 410 |
| PUP | Samuel Stewart | 314 |
| DUP | Jim Strange | 269 |
| DUP | Gladys Service | 247 |
| UUP | James McBride | 143 |
| Alliance | Owen Mulvenna | 61 |
| Turnout | | 3,440 |

Kilroot
| Party | Candidate | 1st Pref |
|---|---|---|
| UUP | Charles Brown | 1,146 |
| DUP | William Cross | 695 |
| Alliance | Janet Crampsey | 615 |
| Ind. Unionist | Robert Hunter | 310 |
| UUP | Robert Patton | 244 |
| UUP | Wesley Mitchell | 203 |
| Alliance | David McCann | 188 |
| DUP | William Sloan | 131 |
| DUP | Raymond Templeton | 121 |
| Turnout | | 3,742 |

Knockagh Monument
| Party | Candidate | 1st Pref |
|---|---|---|
| UUP | Mary Ardill | 736 |
| Independent | Charles Johnston | 660 |
| Alliance | Stewart Dickson | 523 |
| DUP | Andrew Blair | 356 |
| DUP | William Haggan | 350 |
| UUP | Samuel Wilson | 250 |
| Ulster Democratic | Robert Gordon | 246 |
| DUP | Joseph Seaton | 216 |
| Turnout | | 3,648 |

==== Castlereagh ====
Castlereagh Central
| Party | Candidate | 1st Pref |
|---|---|---|
| DUP | Peter Robinson | 3,461 |
| UUP | Herbert Johnstone | 930 |
| Alliance | Patricia Archer | 893 |
| UUP | Ellen Gray | 604 |
| Alliance | Derek Middleton | 422 |
| DUP | Alan Carson | 301 |
| Alliance | William Moreland | 288 |
| Ind. Unionist | Cecil Moore | 133 |
| DUP | Cedric Wilson | 72 |
| DUP | Ivan Castles | 54 |
| Turnout | | 8,035 |

Castlereagh East
| Party | Candidate | 1st Pref |
|---|---|---|
| DUP | Denny Vitty | 2,317 |
| UUP | William Ward | 1,154 |
| UUP | William Abraham | 745 |
| Alliance | Adam Morrow | 699 |
| DUP | Matthew Anderson | 489 |
| Alliance | Mellissa Jeffers | 346 |
| UUP | Ronald Jackson | 270 |
| Alliance | Ian Kirkpatrick | 193 |
| DUP | Albert Johnston | 184 |
| DUP | John Boyle | 150 |
| Ind. Unionist | Michael Brooks | 127 |
| NI Labour | James Bate | 58 |
| NI Labour | William Gunning | 44 |
| NI Labour | William Copley | 27 |
| Turnout | | 6,986 |

Castlereagh South
| Party | Candidate | 1st Pref |
|---|---|---|
| DUP | Ernest Harper | 1,369 |
| DUP | William Clulow | 1,253 |
| UUP | James Clarke | 1,160 |
| UUP | John Glass | 1,055 |
| Alliance | David Andrews | 992 |
| UUP | Frederick Kane | 758 |
| SDLP | Peggy Hanna | 456 |
| DUP | Beatrice Chambers | 416 |
| DUP | Simon Robinson | 316 |
| Alliance | Edward McMillan | 298 |
| Alliance | Ernest Crockett | 188 |
| Ind. Unionist | William Stevenson | 113 |
| Turnout | | 8,535 |

==== Coleraine ====
Bann
| Party | Candidate | 1st Pref |
|---|---|---|
| UUP | William King | 1,310 |
| UUP | Creighton Hutchinson | 1,150 |
| SDLP | John Dallat | 1,086 |
| UUP | William Watt | 922 |
| DUP | Robert Catherwood | 763 |
| SDLP | Gerard O'Kane | 676 |
| UUP | John Moody | 582 |
| DUP | Thomas Malone | 556 |
| DUP | Douglas Darragh | 323 |
| Irish Republican Socialist | Eamon Mullan | 276 |
| Turnout | | 7,799 |

Coleraine Town
| Party | Candidate | 1st Pref |
|---|---|---|
| DUP | James McClure | 2,444 |
| UUP | Robert White | 1,030 |
| Independent | Patrick McFeely | 584 |
| Alliance | William Mathews | 419 |
| UUP | Gladys Black | 368 |
| UUP | Stephen Smyth | 330 |
| SDLP | Dierdre Busby | 286 |
| Independent | William McNabb | 280 |
| Independent | Randall Crawford | 241 |
| DUP | Marie McAllister | 137 |
| Labour Party NI | Timothy Blackman | 110 |
| Alliance | Colum McCloskey | 96 |
| DUP | Robert Bolton | 59 |
| DUP | Geoffrey Whitehead | 28 |
| Turnout | | 6,542 |

The Skerries
| Party | Candidate | 1st Pref |
|---|---|---|
| DUP | William Creelman | 1,056 |
| UUP | William Glenn | 678 |
| UUP | Elizabeth Black | 630 |
| SDLP | Sean Farren | 573 |
| Alliance | Patrick McGowan | 544 |
| UUP | Pauline Armitage | 518 |
| UUP | Hugh Stewart | 378 |
| DUP | Robert Stewart | 374 |
| UUP | Albert Clarke | 319 |
| UUP | Robert Mitchell | 307 |
| DUP | Matthew Kane | 295 |
| Alliance | Peter Scott | 205 |
| UUP | William Robinson | 205 |
| DUP | Roy Hilldrup | 175 |
| Ecology | Margaret O'Neill | 44 |
| Turnout | | 6,414 |

==== Cookstown ====
Ballinderry
| Party | Candidate | 1st Pref |
|---|---|---|
| DUP | William McIntyre | 1,215 |
| Sinn Féin | Patrick McAleer | 1,042 |
| SDLP | Paddy Duffy | 896 |
| Sinn Féin | Francis McNally | 802 |
| UUP | Victor McGahie | 634 |
| UUP | Andrew Booth | 508 |
| DUP | Samuel McCartney | 448 |
| SDLP | Joseph Davidson | 410 |
| SDLP | John O'Neill | 287 |
| Independent | Eric Brown | 287 |
| Turnout | | 6,436 |

Cookstown Central
| Party | Candidate | 1st Pref |
|---|---|---|
| DUP | Alan Kane | 1,444 |
| UUP | Espie Donaldson | 1,088 |
| Sinn Féin | Christopher Neeson | 796 |
| SDLP | Brigid Neeson | 566 |
| Workers' Party | Patrick Bloomer | 408 |
| SDLP | Margaret Laverty | 397 |
| UUP | Edmund Giboney | 220 |
| DUP | Kenneth Loughrin | 178 |
| Turnout | | 5,159 |

Drum Manor
| Party | Candidate | 1st Pref |
|---|---|---|
| DUP | Walter Millar | 1,120 |
| UUP | Samuel Glasgow | 1,042 |
| SDLP | James McGarvey | 908 |
| Sinn Féin | Tony O'Driscoll | 804 |
| Sinn Féin | Sean Begley | 782 |
| United Unionist | Samuel Parke | 487 |
| Turnout | | 5,248 |

==== Craigavon ====
Craigavon Central
| Party | Candidate | 1st Pref |
|---|---|---|
| UUP | Mary Simpson | 1,359 |
| DUP | William Smith | 1,150 |
| UUP | James McCammick | 1,012 |
| SDLP | Brid Rodgers | 883 |
| DUP | Robert Dodds | 690 |
| UUP | Cyril McLoughlin | 641 |
| Sinn Féin | Sheena Campbell | 554 |
| Workers' Party | Tom French | 540 |
| DUP | Meredith Patterson | 536 |
| Alliance | John Hagan | 298 |
| Alliance | James Woods | 85 |
| Turnout | | 7,899 |

Loughside
| Party | Candidate | 1st Pref |
|---|---|---|
| SDLP | Sean McKavanagh | 990 |
| Workers' Party | Paddy Breen | 937 |
| Sinn Féin | Brendan Curran | 837 |
| SDLP | Peter Bunting | 802 |
| UUP | Thomas Bell | 669 |
| SDLP | Patrick Crilly | 555 |
| Sinn Féin | Michael McKee | 516 |
| DUP | Robert Russell | 382 |
| Workers' Party | Karen McStravick | 131 |
| Turnout | | 6,046 |

Lurgan
| Party | Candidate | 1st Pref |
|---|---|---|
| UUP | Sam Gardiner | 1,690 |
| DUP | Frederick Baird | 1,322 |
| UUP | George Savage | 1,070 |
| UUP | Philip Black | 885 |
| SDLP | Hugh News | 808 |
| DUP | David Calvert | 757 |
| Sinn Féin | Patrick Little | 573 |
| DUP | Ian Williams | 500 |
| Alliance | Gordon Burrell | 422 |
| UUP | Sydney Cairns | 405 |
| Turnout | | 8,579 |

Portadown
| Party | Candidate | 1st Pref |
|---|---|---|
| DUP | Gladys McCullough | 1,470 |
| UUP | James Gillespie | 1,338 |
| UUP | George Hatch | 1,138 |
| SDLP | Ignatius Fox | 786 |
| DUP | Michael Briggs | 766 |
| Sinn Féin | Brian McCann | 716 |
| UUP | George Locke | 624 |
| Alliance | William Ramsay | 506 |
| SDLP | Mario McCooe | 462 |
| DUP | William Williamson | 327 |
| Sinn Féin | Sean Dunbar | 326 |
| UUP | Robert Hughes | 253 |
| Turnout | | 8,903 |

==== Derry ====
Cityside
| Party | Candidate | 1st Pref |
|---|---|---|
| Sinn Féin | Anne McGuinness | 870 |
| Sinn Féin | Hugh Brady | 848 |
| Sinn Féin | Mitchel McLaughlin | 838 |
| SDLP | Patrick Devine | 836 |
| SDLP | Tony Carlin | 701 |
| SDLP | Pat Ramsey | 510 |
| SDLP | James Clifford | 499 |
| SDLP | William Keys | 459 |
| Irish Independence | Liam Bradley | 369 |
| Workers' Party | Eamon Melaugh | 253 |
| Irish Independence | Sammy Brown | 144 |
| Irish Independence | John McChrystal | 134 |
| Turnout | | 6,674 |

Northland
| Party | Candidate | 1st Pref |
|---|---|---|
| SDLP | John Tierney | 1,417 |
| Sinn Féin | Bernard McFadden | 1,066 |
| UUP | David Davis | 874 |
| SDLP | Len Green | 800 |
| SDLP | Anna Gallagher | 706 |
| Irish Independence | Fergus McAteer | 681 |
| SDLP | John Kerr | 639 |
| SDLP | William McCorriston | 595 |
| DUP | John Noble | 417 |
| Alliance | Ita Breen | 244 |
| Sinn Féin | James McKnight | 131 |
| Irish Independence | Annie Burke | 98 |
| Irish Independence | John McCool | 66 |
| Turnout | | 7,925 |

Rural
| Party | Candidate | 1st Pref |
|---|---|---|
| DUP | William Hay | 1,008 |
| SDLP | John McNickle | 1,004 |
| SDLP | Annie Courtney | 965 |
| DUP | Ellis Allen | 634 |
| UUP | John Adams | 774 |
| DUP | Mervyn Lindsay | 730 |
| SDLP | Hugh O'Neill | 698 |
| UUP | Ernest Hamilton | 686 |
| SDLP | George Peoples | 662 |
| UUP | Robert Bond | 530 |
| Sinn Féin | Edward McGowan | 304 |
| Irish Independence | Michael Breslin | 276 |
| Sinn Féin | Patrick McNaught | 254 |
| Turnout | | 8,887 |

Shantallow
| Party | Candidate | 1st Pref |
|---|---|---|
| SDLP | William O'Connell | 1,117 |
| SDLP | Mary Bradley | 1,094 |
| SDLP | Noel McKenna | 655 |
| Sinn Féin | Gerard Doherty | 500 |
| Sinn Féin | William McCartney | 489 |
| SDLP | Teresa Coyle | 445 |
| Sinn Féin | Susan O'Hagan | 435 |
| Alliance | Gerry O'Grady | 298 |
| Irish Independence | Robert Hegarty | 243 |
| Irish Independence | James Nicholl | 184 |
| Irish Independence | Joseph Mullan | 174 |
| Turnout | | 5,838 |

Waterside
| Party | Candidate | 1st Pref |
|---|---|---|
| DUP | Gregory Campbell | 2,374 |
| SDLP | Michael Fegan | 874 |
| UUP | James Guy | 818 |
| DUP | Margaret Buchanan | 811 |
| SDLP | Paul O'Donnell | 588 |
| Sinn Féin | Michael Roddy | 483 |
| UUP | George Duddy | 466 |
| UUP | Robert Ferris | 461 |
| Alliance | Robert McCullough | 429 |
| Irish Independence | Bobby Concannon | 261 |
| UUP | Andrew McManus | 169 |
| DUP | Annette Hamilton | 166 |
| Turnout | | 8,044 |

==== Down ====
Ballynahinch
| Party | Candidate | 1st Pref |
|---|---|---|
| SDLP | James Magee | 1,020 |
| UUP | William Brown | 1,004 |
| UUP | James Cochrane | 782 |
| DUP | Thomas Poole | 742 |
| SDLP | Patrick Savage | 596 |
| SDLP | Francis Laverty | 556 |
| Alliance | Patrick Forde | 396 |
| DUP | Stanley Priestley | 273 |
| Turnout | | 5,480 |

Downpatrick
| Party | Candidate | 1st Pref |
|---|---|---|
| SDLP | Edward McGrady | 1,886 |
| UUP | Samuel McCartney | 1,141 |
| SDLP | Dermot Curran | 806 |
| Sinn Féin | Geraldine Ritchie | 694 |
| SDLP | Sean Quinn | 579 |
| Workers' Party | Raymond Blaney | 554 |
| SDLP | John Ritchie | 464 |
| Alliance | Michael Healy | 308 |
| SDLP | Madge McEvoy | 286 |
| Alliance | Margaret Donnelly | 207 |
| Workers' Party | Alan McCullough | 82 |
| Turnout | | 7,166 |

Newcastle
| Party | Candidate | 1st Pref |
|---|---|---|
| UUP | Gerald Douglas | 1,350 |
| Sinn Féin | Hugh McDowell | 855 |
| SDLP | Eamon O'Neill | 827 |
| SDLP | Michael Boyd | 822 |
| DUP | Ethel Smyth | 734 |
| SDLP | James Curry | 444 |
| SDLP | Peter Fitzpatrick | 405 |
| Alliance | Anthony Dickinson | 326 |
| Workers' Party | Edward O'Hagan | 255 |
| Workers' Party | Sean Magee | 102 |
| Turnout | | 6,255 |

Rowallane
| Party | Candidate | 1st Pref |
|---|---|---|
| UUP | Dermot Nesbitt | 1,180 |
| UUP | Samuel Osborne | 1,068 |
| DUP | William Dick | 748 |
| UUP | William Biggerstaff | 642 |
| SDLP | Margaret Ritchie | 629 |
| SDLP | Oliver Flanagan | 531 |
| DUP | Trevor Lennon | 389 |
| Turnout | | 5,274 |

==== Dungannon ====
Blackwater
| Party | Candidate | 1st Pref |
|---|---|---|
| DUP | James Ewing | 979 |
| SDLP | Patsy Daly | 848 |
| UUP | Derek Irwin | 804 |
| Sinn Féin | Eilish McCabe | 803 |
| UUP | Jim Brady | 623 |
| DUP | Norman Lockhart | 616 |
| UUP | John Taggart | 613 |
| UUP | Rodney Mullan | 520 |
| Turnout | | 5,895 |

Clogher Valley
| Party | Candidate | 1st Pref |
|---|---|---|
| Sinn Féin | Seamus Cassidy | 1,280 |
| SDLP | Anthony McGonnell | 1,045 |
| UUP | Samuel Brush | 1,001 |
| UUP | Noel Mulligan | 933 |
| DUP | Johnston McIlwrath | 669 |
| SDLP | John Monaghan | 612 |
| DUP | Thomas Maxwell | 562 |
| Turnout | | 6,195 |

Dungannon Town
| Party | Candidate | 1st Pref |
|---|---|---|
| UUP | Ken Maginnis | 1,329 |
| DUP | Maurice Morrow | 1,086 |
| Ind. Nationalist | Michael McLoughlin | 959 |
| UUP | William Brown | 905 |
| Sinn Féin | Anita Cavlan | 642 |
| Sinn Féin | Martin McNulty | 494 |
| SDLP | Vincent Currie | 424 |
| SDLP | Terence Foley | 205 |
| Turnout | | 6,168 |

Torrent
| Party | Candidate | 1st Pref |
|---|---|---|
| UUP | Thomas Kempton | 1,120 |
| Sinn Féin | Francie Molloy | 1,079 |
| Ind. Nationalist | Jim Canning | 852 |
| Sinn Féin | Brian Duffin | 653 |
| Sinn Féin | Frances Donaghy | 641 |
| SDLP | Jim Cavanagh | 588 |
| SDLP | Patrick McGlinchey | 571 |
| Ind. Nationalist | Owen Nugent | 552 |
| DUP | Edith White | 290 |
| Ind. Nationalist | John Corr | 140 |
| Turnout | | 6,660 |

==== Fermanagh ====
Enniskillen
| Party | Candidate | 1st Pref |
|---|---|---|
| UUP | Raymond Ferguson | 1,169 |
| UUP | Samuel Foster | 1,082 |
| DUP | Roy Coulter | 898 |
| Sinn Féin | Patrick Cox | 885 |
| Sinn Féin | Thomas Maguire | 768 |
| UUP | Edwin Hetherington | 698 |
| DUP | Ivan Foster | 612 |
| UUP | Norman Brown | 442 |
| SDLP | James Donnelly | 411 |
| Workers' Party | David Kettyles | 405 |
| Alliance | William Barbour | 365 |
| SDLP | Eileen Flanagan | 362 |
| SDLP | James Lunny | 358 |
| SDLP | Seamus Rogers | 266 |
| Irish Independence | Anthony Cox | 234 |
| Irish Independence | Patrick O'Reilly | 200 |
| Youth Movement | Floyd Maguire | 74 |
| Turnout | | 9,359 |

Erne East
| Party | Candidate | 1st Pref |
|---|---|---|
| UUP | Cecil Noble | 1,279 |
| Sinn Féin | Plunket O'Neill | 999 |
| Sinn Féin | Thomas Murray | 744 |
| UUP | Albert Liddle | 680 |
| Sinn Féin | Vincent McCaffrey | 679 |
| SDLP | Fergus McQuillan | 669 |
| Sinn Féin | John Joe McCusker | 664 |
| UUP | Thomas Johnston | 645 |
| DUP | William Mitchell | 581 |
| SDLP | James Goodwin | 492 |
| SDLP | John Reihill | 264 |
| Irish Independence | John McMahon | 241 |
| DUP | Caroline Madill | 198 |
| Independent | Seamus Mullan | 113 |
| Turnout | | 8,378 |

Erne North
| Party | Candidate | 1st Pref |
|---|---|---|
| UUP | Caldwell McClaughry | 1,291 |
| DUP | Bert Johnston | 1,088 |
| UUP | Warren Loane | 988 |
| Sinn Féin | Stephen Maguire | 756 |
| SDLP | John O'Kane | 655 |
| SDLP | Tommy Gallagher | 409 |
| SDLP | Dodie Maguire | 389 |
| Irish Independence | Patrick Keown | 299 |
| DUP | Victor Milligan | 287 |
| Alliance | John Haslett | 187 |
| Turnout | | 6,416 |

Erne West
| Party | Candidate | 1st Pref |
|---|---|---|
| UUP | Wilson Elliott | 1,261 |
| Irish Independence | Patrick McCaffrey | 1,156 |
| SDLP | Gerard Gallagher | 826 |
| UUP | Derrick Nixon | 759 |
| Sinn Féin | Patrick Reilly | 757 |
| Sinn Féin | Paul Corrigan | 716 |
| Sinn Féin | Patrick McBrien | 532 |
| Ind. Nationalist | Patrick Flanagan | 465 |
| DUP | Diannah Gott | 759 |
| Sinn Féin | Thomas Keaney | 355 |
| SDLP | Patrick McGovern | 162 |
| Turnout | | 7,535 |

==== Larne ====
Coast Road
| Party | Candidate | 1st Pref |
|---|---|---|
| UUP | Thomas Robinson | 782 |
| Ind. Nationalist | William Cunning | 755 |
| DUP | Winston Fulton | 635 |
| DUP | Rachel Rea | 491 |
| Alliance | Amelia Kelly | 455 |
| UUP | Samuel Martin | 234 |
| DUP | Hill Taggart | 163 |
| Turnout | | 3,597 |

Larne Lough
| Party | Candidate | 1st Pref |
|---|---|---|
| UUP | Roy Beggs | 1,020 |
| DUP | John Alexander | 678 |
| DUP | Samuel McAllister | 491 |
| UUP | Laurence Niblock | 476 |
| Alliance | Thomas Benson | 351 |
| UUP | Thomas Baxter | 347 |
| DUP | Gary Haggan | 320 |
| Turnout | | 3,779 |

Larne Town
| Party | Candidate | 1st Pref |
|---|---|---|
| DUP | Jack McKee | 1,375 |
| Alliance | Liam Kelly | 967 |
| UUP | Robert Robinson | 769 |
| UUP | Rosalie Armstrong | 344 |
| DUP | Leonard Sluman | 94 |
| UUP | Thomas Lamrock | 85 |
| DUP | Frederick Hoey | 42 |
| Turnout | | 3,763 |

==== Limavady ====
Bellarena
| Party | Candidate | 1st Pref |
|---|---|---|
| UUP | Robert Grant | 793 |
| UUP | Stanley Gault | 745 |
| SDLP | Arthur Doherty | 705 |
| SDLP | Thomas Mullan | 590 |
| SDLP | Roy King | 579 |
| DUP | Ernest Murray | 540 |
| Turnout | | 4,027 |

Benbradagh
| Party | Candidate | 1st Pref |
|---|---|---|
| Sinn Féin | Michael McGonigle | 880 |
| UUP | David Robinson | 825 |
| SDLP | Lawrence Hegarty | 585 |
| Independent | Denis Farren | 404 |
| Sinn Féin | Michael Hasson | 367 |
| UUP | Max Gault | 336 |
| SDLP | James Brolly | 316 |
| DUP | John McKay | 184 |
| Turnout | | 3,989 |

Limavady Town
| Party | Candidate | 1st Pref |
|---|---|---|
| SDLP | Barry Doherty | 887 |
| UUP | Ronald Cartwright | 796 |
| UUP | Jackie Dolan | 772 |
| UUP | Samuel Miller | 399 |
| DUP | George Robinson | 268 |
| Ind. Unionist | William Norris | 249 |
| SDLP | Brian McWilliams | 237 |
| Alliance | John Mullan | 228 |
| DUP | Eric Caldwell | 156 |
| Turnout | | 4,045 |

==== Lisburn ====
Downshire
| Party | Candidate | 1st Pref |
|---|---|---|
| UUP | William Bleakes | 2,244 |
| DUP | Charles Poots | 1,089 |
| Alliance | Richard Reid | 954 |
| UUP | Thomas Lilburn | 949 |
| DUP | Denis McCarroll | 856 |
| DUP | Thomas Davis | 786 |
| DUP | James McCann | 665 |
| UUP | William Watson | 410 |
| UUP | Wilfred McClung | 210 |
| Turnout | | 8,304 |

Dunmurry Cross
| Party | Candidate | 1st Pref |
|---|---|---|
| UUP | William McAllister | 1,886 |
| DUP | William Beattie | 1,353 |
| SDLP | William McDonnell | 1,093 |
| Sinn Féin | Damien Gibney | 1,049 |
| Sinn Féin | Patrick Rice | 824 |
| Alliance | Donald Cheyne | 638 |
| Workers' Party | John Lowry | 584 |
| UUP | Norman Tulip | 346 |
| UUP | Richard Scott | 299 |
| DUP | Ronald Kelly | 135 |
| Turnout | | 8,423 |

Killultagh
| Party | Candidate | 1st Pref |
|---|---|---|
| UUP | Robert Campbell | 2,386 |
| DUP | Cecil Calvert | 1,331 |
| UUP | William Lewis | 1,163 |
| SDLP | Paddy Ritchie | 1,070 |
| UUP | William Dillon | 997 |
| Alliance | Eileen Drayne | 704 |
| DUP | Henry Stevenson | 591 |
| DUP | Robert McNeice | 558 |
| UUP | Henry McGiffin | 300 |
| Turnout | | 9,233 |

Lisburn Town
| Party | Candidate | 1st Pref |
|---|---|---|
| DUP | Ivan Davis | 2,888 |
| UUP | William Belshaw | 1,211 |
| Alliance | Seamus Close | 1,013 |
| UUP | Maureen McKinney | 838 |
| UUP | Samuel Semple | 521 |
| UUP | James Davis | 341 |
| Alliance | William Mulholland | 315 |
| DUP | James Mulholland | 179 |
| DUP | Robert Dunsmore | 137 |
| Turnout | | 7,606 |

==== Magherafelt ====
Magherafelt Town
| Party | Candidate | 1st Pref |
|---|---|---|
| DUP | William McCrea | 2,050 |
| Sinn Féin | Lughaidh Bhrighde | 1,297 |
| SDLP | Patrick Kilpatrick | 1,068 |
| UUP | Ernest Caldwell | 851 |
| SDLP | Joseph McGlone | 404 |
| UUP | James Artt | 331 |
| Alliance | Harold Hutchinson | 213 |
| DUP | Barclay Morrow | 145 |
| Turnout | | 6,440 |

Moyola
| Party | Candidate | 1st Pref |
|---|---|---|
| UUP | John Junkin | 987 |
| Sinn Féin | John Davey | 948 |
| SDLP | Henry McErlean | 904 |
| DUP | Thomas Catherwood | 837 |
| Sinn Féin | Francis McElwee | 740 |
| DUP | Thomas Milligan | 721 |
| UUP | Alex Montgomery | 458 |
| SDLP | Francis Madden | 341 |
| Turnout | | 6,096 |

Sperrin
| Party | Candidate | 1st Pref |
|---|---|---|
| Sinn Féin | Patrick Doherty | 1,028 |
| UUP | Walter Richardson | 935 |
| SDLP | Mary McSorley | 865 |
| Sinn Féin | Patrick Toner | 770 |
| DUP | John Linton | 652 |
| SDLP | Patrick Sweeney | 645 |
| SDLP | John Bradley | 507 |
| SDLP | Frank McKendry | 452 |
| Workers' Party | Francis Donnelly | 239 |
| Turnout | | 6,201 |

==== Moyle ====
Ballycastle
| Party | Candidate | 1st Pref |
|---|---|---|
| DUP | Gardiner Kane | 524 |
| SDLP | Michael O'Cleary | 327 |
| Sinn Féin | Francis McCarry | 276 |
| UUP | Robert McPherson | 255 |
| Independent | James McShane | 218 |
| Independent | Archie McAuley | 154 |
| SDLP | Richard Kerr | 148 |
| SDLP | Noel McCurdy | 95 |
| Turnout | | 2,045 |

Giant's Causeway
| Party | Candidate | 1st Pref |
|---|---|---|
| DUP | James Rodgers | 358 |
| Ind. Unionist | Price McConaghy | 338 |
| UUP | Robert Getty | 328 |
| DUP | Duncan Hill | 244 |
| UUP | James McAuley | 239 |
| Ind. Unionist | Mary Morrison | 230 |
| DUP | Ronnie McIlvar | 211 |
| Turnout | | 1,988 |

The Glens
| Party | Candidate | 1st Pref |
|---|---|---|
| SDLP | Malachy McSparran | 343 |
| SDLP | Dermot McMullan | 343 |
| SDLP | Daniel Anderson | 321 |
| Sinn Féin | John Regan | 301 |
| Ind. Nationalist | Randal McDonnell | 271 |
| SDLP | Patrick McBride | 253 |
| UUP | Hugh Acheson | 213 |
| SDLP | Mary Hegarty | 123 |
| Sinn Féin | James McCarry | 118 |
| Sinn Féin | James McMullan | 82 |
| Irish Independence | John McKay | 71 |
| Turnout | | 2,472 |

==== Newry and Mourne ====
Crotlieve
| Party | Candidate | 1st Pref |
|---|---|---|
| SDLP | P. J. Bradley | 1,717 |
| SDLP | Jim McCart | 904 |
| UUP | Violet Cromie | 849 |
| Ind. Nationalist | Ciaran Mussen | 682 |
| SDLP | Brian Mulligan | 635 |
| Ind. Nationalist | Sean Tinnelly | 602 |
| SDLP | Patrick Harper | 561 |
| UUP | William McCoy | 547 |
| DUP | William Sterritt | 537 |
| SDLP | Liam Trainor | 393 |
| Independent | Francis Price | 176 |
| Workers' Party | Henry Smyth | 141 |
| Independent Labour | Johnny Ward | 30 |
| Turnout | | 8,005 |

Newry Town
| Party | Candidate | 1st Pref |
|---|---|---|
| Irish Independence | Eugene Markey | 1,003 |
| UUP | William McCaigue | 938 |
| SDLP | Sean Gallogly | 918 |
| SDLP | Arthur Ruddy | 892 |
| Sinn Féin | Brendan Curran | 704 |
| SDLP | Patrick McElroy | 588 |
| SDLP | Thomas McGrath | 558 |
| SDLP | John McArdle | 383 |
| Sinn Féin | Sean Mathers | 380 |
| Sinn Féin | Deborah Morgan | 347 |
| Workers' Party | Tom Moore | 266 |
| Independent | James McKevitt | 226 |
| Irish Independence | Freddie Kearns | 136 |
| Independent | Noel Sloan | 82 |
| Turnout | | 7,658 |

Slieve Gullion
| Party | Candidate | 1st Pref |
|---|---|---|
| Sinn Féin | Jim McAllister | 1,199 |
| SDLP | Pat Toner | 1,074 |
| SDLP | Owen Kelly | 788 |
| SDLP | Noel McKevitt | 777 |
| Sinn Féin | Eamon Larkin | 711 |
| Sinn Féin | Patrick Murphy | 623 |
| Irish Independence | Jim Murphy | 268 |
| Sinn Féin | Sarah Murphy | 261 |
| Ind. Republican | Brian Woods | 187 |
| Turnout | | 5,888 |

The Fews
| Party | Candidate | 1st Pref |
|---|---|---|
| Sinn Féin | Brendan Lewis | 1,302 |
| SDLP | James Savage | 911 |
| UUP | William Moffett | 767 |
| SDLP | Nan Sands | 763 |
| UUP | Danny Kennedy | 750 |
| DUP | Gordon Heslip | 543 |
| UUP | David McMullan | 494 |
| SDLP | John McElherron | 450 |
| UUP | Florence Henning | 393 |
| Alliance | Victor Frizell | 356 |
| Workers' Party | Brian Mulligan | 91 |
| Irish Independence | Francis McCamley | 54 |
| Turnout | | 7,015 |

The Mournes
| Party | Candidate | 1st Pref |
|---|---|---|
| DUP | George Graham | 1,422 |
| UUP | William Russell | 1,391 |
| SDLP | Colum Murnion | 1,058 |
| Sinn Féin | Patrick Young | 820 |
| UUP | William Coulter | 802 |
| SDLP | Anne Marie Cunningham | 643 |
| DUP | William Burns | 270 |
| Turnout | | 6,595 |

==== Newtownabbey ====
Antrim Line
| Party | Candidate | 1st Pref |
|---|---|---|
| UUP | William Green | 873 |
| Alliance | James Rooney | 791 |
| DUP | Billy McDonnell | 725 |
| UUP | Ivan Hunter | 668 |
| DUP | Mary Harkness | 638 |
| UUP | Joseph Kell | 522 |
| SDLP | Thomas McTeague | 452 |
| SDLP | Margaret Harrison | 313 |
| Newtownabbey Labour Party | Thomas Davidson | 81 |
| Newtownabbey Labour Party | Lindsay Prior | 37 |
| Turnout | | 5,238 |

Ballyclare
| Party | Candidate | 1st Pref |
|---|---|---|
| Ind. Unionist | Arthur Templeton | 1,007 |
| DUP | Samuel Gardiner | 900 |
| Ind. Unionist | Sidney Cameron | 755 |
| UUP | James Wilson | 606 |
| DUP | Winston Hanna | 431 |
| Independent | Leonard Hardy | 389 |
| UUP | William Christie | 377 |
| Independent | Nan Foster | 298 |
| Alliance | Albert Reid | 290 |
| UUP | Robert McKenzie | 167 |
| Turnout | | 5,336 |

Doagh Road
| Party | Candidate | 1st Pref |
|---|---|---|
| DUP | Jim Allister | 1,381 |
| UUP | Fraser Agnew | 916 |
| Newtownabbey Labour Party | Bob Kidd | 436 |
| UUP | Andrew Beattie | 355 |
| UUP | Letitia McCartney | 307 |
| Alliance | John Elliott | 293 |
| DUP | David Hollis | 258 |
| All Night Party | Mark Langhammer | 203 |
| Workers' Party | Austin Kelly | 193 |
| Newtownabbey Labour Party | David Lowrie | 128 |
| DUP | Charles South | 100 |
| All Night Party | Roy Wallace | 13 |
| All Night Party | David Coburn | 12 |
| All Night Party | Douglas Edwards | 6 |
| All Night Party | William McClinton | 1 |
| Turnout | | 4,786 |

Manse Road
| Party | Candidate | 1st Pref |
|---|---|---|
| UUP | George Herron | 1,400 |
| DUP | Edward Cassells | 982 |
| UUP | James Robinson | 736 |
| DUP | Samuel Neill | 701 |
| Alliance | George Jones | 596 |
| UUP | James Smith | 396 |
| SDLP | Bernard Conlon | 207 |
| UUP | Agnes Sloan | 185 |
| Turnout | | 5,307 |

Shore Road
| Party | Candidate | 1st Pref |
|---|---|---|
| DUP | Billy Boyd | 1,370 |
| UUP | Robert Caul | 1,340 |
| UUP | Ken Robinson | 712 |
| Alliance | Leo McKenna | 638 |
| DUP | Billy Gillespie | 336 |
| PUP | John Niblock | 333 |
| Ind. Unionist | Desmond Dowds | 297 |
| Campaign for Human and Animal Rights | Helen Craig | 124 |
| Newtownabbey Labour Party | Thomas Crawford | 61 |
| Newtownabbey Labour Party | James Devlin | 49 |
| Independent | Claire Martin | 15 |
| Turnout | | 5,392 |

==== North Down ====
Abbey
| Party | Candidate | 1st Pref |
|---|---|---|
| DUP | John McCormick | 1,104 |
| UUP | George Green | 945 |
| UPUP | Brian Meharg | 766 |
| Alliance | James Magee | 634 |
| DUP | Ivy Cooling | 457 |
| UUP | John Preston | 296 |
| Alliance | James Pettis | 167 |
| DUP | Raymond Trousdale | 135 |
| PUP | Kenneth McMullan | 92 |
| UUP | Ernest Jackson | 74 |
| Turnout | | 4,824 |

Ballyholme and Groomsport
| Party | Candidate | 1st Pref |
|---|---|---|
| UUP | Bruce Mulligan | 893 |
| Ind. Unionist | Edmund Mills | 871 |
| DUP | Alan Leslie | 795 |
| Alliance | Donald Hayes | 737 |
| UUP | Samuel Hamilton | 610 |
| UPUP | Valerie Kinghan | 559 |
| Alliance | Sylvia Anderson | 471 |
| Alliance | Jane Copeland | 465 |
| DUP | Elizabeth Loan | 399 |
| UUP | Enid Stringer | 213 |
| PUP | Samuel Meneely | 18 |
| Turnout | | 6,124 |

Bangor West
| Party | Candidate | 1st Pref |
|---|---|---|
| UUP | Hazel Bradford | 1,695 |
| DUP | Alan Graham | 970 |
| Alliance | William Bailie | 913 |
| Alliance | Brian Wilson | 686 |
| UPUP | Ian Sinclair | 505 |
| UUP | Cecil Braniff | 414 |
| DUP | George McMurtry | 381 |
| PUP | Thomas O'Brien | 267 |
| Alliance | Alfred Mairs | 261 |
| UUP | William Smiley | 172 |
| DUP | William Swain | 134 |
| UUP | Edward Lindsay | 118 |
| Turnout | | 6,669 |

Holywood
| Party | Candidate | 1st Pref |
|---|---|---|
| UUP | Ellie McKay | 786 |
| UUP | John Auld | 784 |
| Alliance | Susan O'Brien | 765 |
| Alliance | Michael Clarke | 702 |
| DUP | Gordon Dunne | 654 |
| Independent | Dennis Ogborn | 585 |
| UPUP | James White | 310 |
| UUP | Roger Lomas | 115 |
| DUP | Elizabeth Graham | 102 |
| Turnout | | 4,896 |

==== Omagh ====
Mid Tyrone
| Party | Candidate | 1st Pref |
|---|---|---|
| Sinn Féin | Seamus Kerr | 1,634 |
| Sinn Féin | James McElduff | 975 |
| Sinn Féin | Barney McAleer | 914 |
| DUP | Willis Cooke | 863 |
| UUP | William Thompson | 824 |
| SDLP | Paddy McGowan | 569 |
| DUP | Tommy Armstrong | 510 |
| SDLP | Nuala McSherry | 380 |
| Irish Independence | Brian McGrath | 370 |
| Alliance | Patrick Bogan | 297 |
| Workers' Party | Patrick McClean | 253 |
| UUP | Cecil Beattie | 219 |
| Turnout | | 7,948 |

Omagh Town
| Party | Candidate | 1st Pref |
|---|---|---|
| Sinn Féin | Francis Mackey | 1,213 |
| DUP | Oliver Gibson | 848 |
| Independent | Johnny McLaughlin | 779 |
| SDLP | Bernadette Grant | 586 |
| DUP | David Aiken | 517 |
| UUP | Wilfred Breen | 463 |
| SDLP | Stephen McKenna | 421 |
| UUP | Thomas Strain | 402 |
| Alliance | James Lagan | 374 |
| SDLP | Arthur Breen | 346 |
| Workers' Party | Hugh Gormley | 143 |
| Alliance | Richard Hinds | 129 |
| DUP | Raymond Farrell | 105 |
| Irish Independence | James Sweeney | 75 |
| Alliance | Dermot McCormack | 73 |
| Turnout | | 6,598 |

West Tyrone
| Party | Candidate | 1st Pref |
|---|---|---|
| UUP | Arthur McFarland | 1,186 |
| Sinn Féin | Cecilia Quinn | 1,111 |
| DUP | Harry Cairns | 938 |
| SDLP | Liam McQuaid | 839 |
| Sinn Féin | Gerry McMenamin | 738 |
| UUP | Robert Moses | 630 |
| Sinn Féin | James McElhinney | 426 |
| SDLP | Gregory McMullan | 394 |
| SDLP | John Skelton | 370 |
| Irish Independence | Patrick Donnelly | 347 |
| DUP | George Thompson | 268 |
| Workers' Party | Tommy Owens | 204 |
| Alliance | Eric Bullick | 175 |
| DUP | Hazel McKenzie | 151 |
| Irish Independence | James Connolly | 140 |
| Turnout | | 8,091 |

==== Strabane ====
Derg
| Party | Candidate | 1st Pref |
|---|---|---|
| Sinn Féin | Charles McHugh | 1,534 |
| UUP | Edward Turner | 1,357 |
| DUP | Thomas Kerrigan | 1,270 |
| Ind. Nationalist | Denis McCrory | 480 |
| DUP | Noel Finlayson | 411 |
| SDLP | James Fitzsimons | 328 |
| DUP | David Baird | 256 |
| SDLP | William Flanagan | 207 |
| Turnout | | 5,938 |

Glenelly
| Party | Candidate | 1st Pref |
|---|---|---|
| UUP | Mary Britton | 1,381 |
| SDLP | John Gallagher | 1,051 |
| DUP | Samuel Rogers | 972 |
| DUP | Ronald Brolly | 795 |
| Sinn Féin | Thomas McNamee | 772 |
| Ind. Nationalist | Francis McConnell | 596 |
| DUP | Violet McGerrigle | 294 |
| Turnout | | 5,978 |

Mourne
| Party | Candidate | 1st Pref |
|---|---|---|
| Sinn Féin | Ivan Barr | 1,581 |
| Ind. Nationalist | James O'Kane | 1,250 |
| SDLP | Paul O'Hare | 757 |
| SDLP | Margaret McManus | 588 |
| UUP | John Cummings | 575 |
| DUP | Desmond Monteith | 527 |
| SDLP | Mary McCrea | 388 |
| Turnout | | 5,796 |
