= 1977 Ballymena Borough Council election =

Local government election in Northern Ireland

← 1973	18 May 1977	1981 →

All 21 seats to Ballymena Borough Council 11 seats needed for a majority
	First party	Second party	Third party
Party	DUP	UUP	Ind. Unionist
Seats won	11	4	3
Seat change	▲6	▼5	Steady
	Fourth party	Fifth party	Sixth party
Party	Independent	Alliance	Vanguard
Seats won	2	1	0
Seat change	Steady	Steady	▼1

Elections to Ballymena Borough Council were held on 18 May 1977 on the same day as the other Northern Irish local government elections. The election used four district electoral areas to elect a total of 21 councillors.

== Election results ==
Ballymena Borough Council Election Result 1977
Party	Seats	Gains	Losses	Net gain/loss	Seats %	Votes %	Votes	+/−
DUP	11	6	0	▲6	52.4	40.1	5,175	▲15.9
UUP	4	1	6	▼5	19.0	19.5	2,523	▼18.4
Ind. Unionist	3	3	3	Steady	14.3	21.4	2,765	▲12.1
Independent	2	1	1	Steady	9.5	13.7	1,774	▼0.8
Alliance	1	0	0	Steady	4.8	5.2	672	▼1.2

Note: "Votes" are the first preference votes.

== Districts summary ==
Results of the Ballymena Borough Council election, 1977 by district
Ward	%	Cllrs	%	Cllrs	%	Cllrs	%	Cllrs	Total Cllrs
Ward	DUP		UUP		Alliance		Others		Total Cllrs
Area A	36.6	2	28.3	1	0.0	0	35.1	1	4
Area B	N/A	4	N/A	2	N/A	0	N/A	0	6
Area C	50.5	3	13.3	0	0.0	0	36.2	2	5
Area D	34.3	2	18.4	1	12.0	1	35.3	2	6
Total	40.1	11	19.5	4	5.2	1	35.2	5	21

== Districts results ==
=== Area A ===
1973: 2 x UUP, 1 x DUP, 1 x Independent
1977: 2 x DUP, 1 x UUP, 1 x Independent
1973-1977 Change: DUP gain from UUP

Ballymena Area A - 4 seats
Party	Candidate	FPv%	Count		
Party	Candidate	FPv%	1	2	3
Independent	James Woulahan	21.93%	784		
DUP	William Turtle	20.28%	725		
DUP	James Millar	20.03%	584	716	
UUP	Thomas Hume*	14.43%	516	531	698
UUP	Thomas McCaughey*	13.87%	496	498	589
Ind. Unionist	Lyle Cubitt	8.62%	308	315	
Ind. Unionist	William Wilson*	4.53%	162		
Electorate: 5,986 Valid: 3,575 (59.72%) Spoilt: 79 Quota: 716 Turnout: 3,654 (61.04%)

=== Area B ===
1973: 2 x DUP, 2 x Independent Unionist, 1 x UUP, 1 x Independent
1977: 4 x DUP, 2 x UUP
1973-1977 Change: DUP (two seats) gain from UUP and Independent, Independent Unionists (two seats) join UUP

Ballymena Area B - 6 seats
Party	Candidate	FPv%	Count
Party	Candidate	FPv%	1
DUP	Roy Gillespie*	N/A	N/A
DUP	John Greer	N/A	N/A
DUP	Hubert Nicholl	N/A	N/A
UUP	Hugh Simpson*	N/A	N/A
UUP	Thomas Smyth*	N/A	N/A
DUP	Sandy Spence*	N/A	N/A
Electorate: N/A Valid: N/A Spoilt: N/A Quota: N/A Turnout: N/A

- As only six candidates had been nominated for six seats, there was no vote in Area B and all six candidates were deemed elected.

=== Area C ===
1973: 3 x UUP, 1 x DUP, 1 x Vanguard
1977: 3 x DUP, 2 x Independent Unionist
1973-1977 Change: DUP gain from UUP, Independent Unionists (two seats) leave UUP and Vanguard

Ballymena Area C - 5 seats
Party	Candidate	FPv%	Count					
Party	Candidate	FPv%	1	2	3	4	5	6
DUP	John McAuley*	22.61%	928					
Ind. Unionist	George Sloane*	20.71%	850					
DUP	Desmond McBurney	18.56%	762					
Ind. Unionist	David Allen*	15.47%	635	653.34	716.36			
DUP	Albert Young	9.33%	383	589.82	593.81	658.41	677.66	678.92
UUP	William Simpson	7.87%	323	327.59	376.94	381.04	583.55	612.39
UUP	Robert McCosh	5.46%	224	236.96	285.05	288.75		
Electorate: 9,789 Valid: 4,105 (41.93%) Spoilt: 183 Quota: 685 Turnout: 4,288 (43.80%)

=== Area D ===
1973: 3 x UUP, 1 x DUP, 1 x Alliance, 1 x Independent
1977: 2 x DUP, 1 x UUP, 1 x Alliance, 1 x Independent, 1 x Independent Unionist
1973-1977 Change: DUP gain from UUP, Independent Unionist leaves UUP

Ballymena Area D - 6 seats
Party	Candidate	FPv%	Count					
Party	Candidate	FPv%	1	2	3	4	5	6
Independent	Patrick Burke*	18.93%	990					
Ind. Unionist	Samuel Henry*	15.49%	810					
Alliance	Muriel Lamont	12.85%	672	882.08				
UUP	William Rainey	12.89%	674	683.1	736.4	764.56		
DUP	Maurice Mills*	12.18%	637	638.56	640.9	644.66	702.56	706.24
DUP	James Alexander	11.61%	607	609.08	611.94	615.06	667.66	671.66
DUP	Robert McAuley	10.50%	549	552.64	553.42	556.38	582.42	583.94
UUP	David Thompson*	5.55%	290	297.28	326.66	348.66		
Electorate: 11,819 Valid: 5,229 (44.24%) Spoilt: 176 Quota: 748 Turnout: 5,405 (45.73%)
