= Ballymena Area D =

District electoral areas in Ballymena, Northern Ireland

Ballymena Area D was one of the four district electoral areas in Ballymena, Northern Ireland which existed from 1973 to 1985. The district elected six members to Ballymena Borough Council, and formed part of the North Antrim constituencies for the Northern Ireland Assembly and UK Parliament.

It was created for the 1973 local elections, and contained the wards of Ballyloughan, Castle Demesne, Dunclug, Fair Green, Park and Waveney. It was abolished for the 1985 local elections and replaced by the Ballymena Town DEA.

== Councillors ==
Election	Councillor (Party)	Councillor (Party)	Councillor (Party)	Councillor (Party)	Councillor (Party)	Councillor (Party)
1981	Maurice Mills (DUP)	James Alexander (DUP)	Robert Maternaghan (DUP)	Gordon Wilson (UUP)	Samuel Henry (Independent Unionist)/ (UUP)	Patrick Burke (Independent)
1977	Maurice Mills (DUP)	James Alexander (DUP)	Muriel Lamont (Alliance)	William Rainey (UUP)	Samuel Henry (Independent Unionist)/ (UUP)	Patrick Burke (Independent)
1973	Maurice Mills (DUP)	R. L. D. Pinkerton (UUP)	J. O'Mullan (Alliance)	David Thompson (UUP)	Samuel Henry (Independent Unionist)/ (UUP)	Patrick Burke (Independent)

== 1981 Election ==
1977: 2 x DUP, 1 x UUP, 1 x Alliance, 1 x Independent, 1 x Independent Unionist

1981: 3 x DUP, 1 x UUP, 1 x Independent, 1 x Independent Unionist

1977-1981 Change: DUP gain from Alliance

Ballymena Area D - 6 seats
Party	Candidate	FPv%	Count						
Party	Candidate	FPv%	1	2	3	4	5	6	7
Independent	Patrick Burke*	20.12%	1,331						
DUP	Maurice Mills*	16.82%	1,113						
Ind. Unionist	Samuel Henry*	11.94%	790	972.35					
DUP	James Alexander*	13.57%	898	900.1	983.2				
UUP	Gordon Wilson	8.27%	547	553.65	558.45	558.87	560.91	803.69	917.34
DUP	Robert Maternaghan	11.46%	758	758.7	824.55	860.25	860.31	868.8	893.26
UUP	Kenneth Wood	7.57%	501	524.1	527.25	527.6	530.96	662.67	802.89
Independent	Samuel Barr	4.28%	283	434.2	436.9	437.18	455.9	472.22	
UUP	James Rainey	5.97%	395	408.65	413.75	414.1	415.3		
Electorate: 11,475 Valid: 6,616 (57.66%) Spoilt: 139 Quota: 946 Turnout: 6,755 (58.87%)

== 1977 Election ==
1973: 3 x UUP, 1 x DUP, 1 x Alliance, 1 x Independent

1977: 2 x DUP, 1 x UUP, 1 x Alliance, 1 x Independent, 1 x Independent Unionist

1973-1977 Change: DUP gain from UUP, Independent Unionist leaves UUP

Ballymena Area D - 6 seats
Party	Candidate	FPv%	Count					
Party	Candidate	FPv%	1	2	3	4	5	6
Independent	Patrick Burke*	18.93%	990					
Ind. Unionist	Samuel Henry*	15.49%	810					
Alliance	Muriel Lamont	12.85%	672	882.08				
UUP	William Rainey	12.89%	674	683.1	736.4	764.56		
DUP	Maurice Mills*	12.18%	637	638.56	640.9	644.66	702.56	706.24
DUP	James Alexander	11.61%	607	609.08	611.94	615.06	667.66	671.66
DUP	Robert McAuley	10.50%	549	552.64	553.42	556.38	582.42	583.94
UUP	David Thompson*	5.55%	290	297.28	326.66	348.66		
Electorate: 11,819 Valid: 5,229 (44.24%) Spoilt: 176 Quota: 748 Turnout: 5,405 (45.73%)

== 1973 Election ==
1973: 3 x UUP, 1 x DUP, 1 x Alliance, 1 x Independent

Ballymena Area D - 6 seats
Party	Candidate	FPv%	Count								
Party	Candidate	FPv%	1	2	3	4	5	6	7	8	9
UUP	Samuel Henry	34.37%	2,321								
DUP	Maurice Mills	19.81%	1,338								
Independent	Patrick Burke	11.58%	782	823.18	826.54	903.82	907.82	955.46	967.36		
UUP	R. L. D. Pinkerton	2.71%	183	555.94	574.98	579.58	625.38	653.44	912.32	1,065.32	
UUP	David Thompson	5.29%	357	663.24	678.64	688.96	790.46	813.4	890.72	1,063.72	
Alliance	J. O'Mullan	7.48%	505	527.04	528.72	577.58	580.9	770.64	804.86	830.76	????
DUP	H. S. Roulton	3.04%	205	266.48	574.2	584.22	594.58	597.86	617.8	694.34	????
UUP	J. D. Walker	4.07%	275	420	427	429.58	517.1	531.26	565.92		
UUP	John Magaughin	1.91%	129	368.54	376.66	388	416.36	428.68			
Alliance	Phyllis Doloughan	4.19%	283	297.5	298.06	339.34	346.36				
UUP	Dorothy Smith	2.44%	165	283.32	287.8	292.68					
NI Labour	S. McQuiston	1.64%	111	126.08	127.2						
NI Labour	J. A. Rooney	1.47%	99	99	100.96						
Electorate: 10,323 Valid: 6,753 (65.42%) Spoilt: 91 Quota: 965 Turnout: 6,844 (66.30%)

- Data missing from stage 9
