= Ballymena Area B =

District electoral areas in Ballymena, Northern Ireland

Ballymena Area B was one of the four district electoral areas in Ballymena, Northern Ireland which existed from 1973 to 1985. The district elected six members to Ballymena Borough Council, and formed part of the North Antrim constituencies for the Northern Ireland Assembly and UK Parliament.

It was created for the 1973 local elections, and contained the wards of Ahoghill, Cullybackey, Dunminning, Galgorm, Grange and Portglenone. It was abolished for the 1985 local elections and replaced by The Main DEA.

== Councillors ==
Election	Councillor (Party)	Councillor (Party)	Councillor (Party)	Councillor (Party)	Councillor (Party)	Councillor (Party)
1981	Roy Gillespie (DUP)	Sandy Spence (DUP)	John Greer (DUP)	Tommy Nicholl (DUP)	William Wright (UUP)	Hugh Simpson (UUP)/ (Independent Unionist)
1977	Roy Gillespie (DUP)	Sandy Spence (DUP)	John Greer (DUP)	Hubert Nicholl (DUP)	Thomas Smyth (UUP)/ (Independent Unionist)	Hugh Simpson (UUP)/ (Independent Unionist)
1973	Roy Gillespie (DUP)	Sandy Spence (DUP)	A. Simpson (Independent)	W. Dickey (UUP)	Thomas Smyth (UUP)/ (Independent Unionist)	Hugh Simpson (UUP)/ (Independent Unionist)

== 1981 Election ==
1977: 4 x DUP, 2 x UUP

1981: 4 x DUP, 2 x UUP

1977-1981 Change: No change

Ballymena Area B - 7 seats
Party	Candidate	FPv%	Count								
Party	Candidate	FPv%	1	2	3	4	5	6	7	8	9
DUP	Roy Gillespie*	19.20%	1,254								
DUP	Sandy Spence*	15.02%	981								
DUP	John Greer*	13.06%	853	1,075.3							
UUP	Hugh Simpson*	8.22%	537	538.56	539.52	590.52	593.12	793.19	1,109.19		
UUP	William Wright*	7.10%	464	474.14	474.78	605.56	608.91	661.68	807.62	972.07	
DUP	Tommy Nicholl	11.33%	740	763.66	771.34	793.34	824.04	831.75	844.29	848.19	860.54
DUP	Hubert Nicholl*	9.43%	616	649.02	765.82	765.82	773.67	794.06	830.53	835.08	853.93
UUP	Robert Nelson	6.33%	413	431.2	438.88	473.88	474.73	561.18			
UUP	Thomas Smyth*	6.16%	402	409.8	410.28	435.28	436.93				
UUP	John Sutter	4.15%	271	272.04	272.04						
Electorate: 9,994 Valid: 6,531 (65.35%) Spoilt: 240 Quota: 934 Turnout: 6,771 (67.75%)

== 1977 Election ==
1973: 2 x DUP, 2 x Independent Unionist, 1 x UUP, 1 x Independent

1977: 4 x DUP, 2 x UUP

1973-1977 Change: DUP (two seats) gain from UUP and Independent, Independent Unionists (two seats) join UUP

Ballymena Area B - 6 seats
Party	Candidate	FPv%	Count
Party	Candidate	FPv%	1
DUP	Roy Gillespie*	N/A	N/A
DUP	John Greer	N/A	N/A
DUP	Hubert Nicholl	N/A	N/A
UUP	Hugh Simpson*	N/A	N/A
UUP	Thomas Smyth*	N/A	N/A
DUP	Sandy Spence*	N/A	N/A
Electorate: N/A Valid: N/A Spoilt: N/A Quota: N/A Turnout: N/A

- As only six candidates had been nominated for six seats, there was no vote in Area B and all six candidates were deemed elected.

== 1973 Election ==
1973: 2 x UUP, 2 x Independent Unionist, 1 x DUP, 1 x Independent

Ballymena Area B - 4 seats
Party	Candidate	FPv%	Count					
Party	Candidate	FPv%	1	2	3	4	5	6
Independent	A. Simpson	22.30%	1,390					
DUP	Sandy Spence	20.07%	1,251					
DUP	Roy Gillespie	19.06%	1,188					
UUP	W. Dickey	11.78%	734	930.8				
Ind. Unionist	Hugh Simpson	7.49%	467	541	648.3	728.34	814.64	894.12
Ind. Unionist	Thomas Smyth	6.03%	376	431.6	504.1	607.6	693.1	786.54
UUP	W. O. Given	4.19%	261	305.8	433.98	481.36	569.28	685.18
Alliance	Maeve Kyle	5.30%	330	398.4	413.48	420.38	435.78	
Independent	W. R. McNeilly	3.77%	235	291	324.64	378		
Electorate: 9,474 Valid: 6,232 (65.78%) Spoilt: 61 Quota: 891 Turnout: 6,293 (66.42%)
