= 1989 Ballymena Borough Council election =

Local government election in Northern Ireland

← 1985	17 May 1989	1993 →

All 23 seats to Ballymena Borough Council 12 seats needed for a majority
	First party	Second party	Third party
Party	DUP	UUP	SDLP
Seats won	12	7	1
Seat change	▼3	▲1	0
	Fourth party	Fifth party	Sixth party
Party	Alliance	Ind. Unionist	Independent
Seats won	1	1	1
Seat change	▲1	0	▲1

Elections to Ballymena Borough Council were held on 17 May 1989 on the same day as the other Northern Irish local government elections. The election used four district electoral areas to elect a total of 23 councillors.

== Election results ==
Ballymena Borough Council Election Result 1989
Party	Seats	Gains	Losses	Net gain/loss	Seats %	Votes %	Votes	+/−
DUP	12	0	3	▼3	52.2	44.8	9,435	▼10.8
UUP	7	1	0	▲1	30.4	30.8	6,491	▲2.2
SDLP	1	0	0	0	4.3	9.2	1,926	▲2.9
Alliance	1	1	0	▲1	4.2	6.1	1,280	▲6.1
Ind. Unionist	1	0	0	0	4.3	4.9	1,033	▼0.7
Independent	1	1	0	▲1	4.3	4.2	887	▲0.2

Note: "Votes" are the first preference votes.

== Districts summary ==
Results of the Ballymena Borough Council election, 1989 by district
Ward	%	Cllrs	%	Cllrs	%	Cllrs	%	Cllrs	%	Cllrs	Total Cllrs
Ward	DUP		UUP		SDLP		Alliance		Others		Total Cllrs
Ballymena Town	26.8	2	23.7	2	21.8	1	14.0	1	13.7	1	7
Braid Valley	40.9	2	41.7	2	0.0	0	0.0	0	17.4	1	5
Kells Water	58.7	4	36.5	2	0.0	0	0.0	0	4.8	0	6
The Main	56.6	4	23.7	1	11.4	0	8.3	0	0.0	0	5
Total	44.8	12	30.8	7	9.2	1	6.1	1	9.1	2	23

== Districts results ==
=== Ballymena Town ===
1985: 3 x DUP, 2 x UUP, 1 x SDLP, 1 x Independent Unionist
1989: 2 x DUP, 2 x UUP, 1 x SDLP, 1 x Alliance, 1 x Independent Unionist
1985-1989 Change: Alliance gain from DUP

Ballymena Town - 7 seats
Party	Candidate	FPv%	Count							
Party	Candidate	FPv%	1	2	3	4	5	6	7	8
SDLP	Patrick McAvoy*	15.06%	897							
Alliance	Gareth Williams	13.97%	832							
Ind. Unionist	Samuel Henry*	13.67%	814							
UUP	James Alexander	10.60%	631	631.17	651.32	668.06	750.12			
DUP	Maurice Mills*	8.14%	485	485	488.12	495.14	501.99	724.64	969.75	
UUP	Robert Coulter*	9.99%	595	595	612.55	631.54	738.14	743.49	784.65	
DUP	John Wilson	7.42%	442	442	445.51	447.94	451.88	466.06	592.47	783.26
SDLP	Declan O'Loan	6.77%	403	553.45	573.34	576.04	580.65	581.65	582.65	585.65
DUP	John Carson	6.87%	409	409	410.69	413.12	416.87	433.05		
DUP	Vera Mills	4.38%	261	261.34	261.99	263.52	264.01			
UUP	Robert Simpson	3.12%	186	186	204.2	220.13				
Electorate: 12,831 Valid: 5,955 (46.41%) Spoilt: 130 Quota: 745 Turnout: 6,085 (47.42%)

=== Braid Valley ===
1985: 3 x DUP, 2 x UUP
1989: 2 x DUP, 2 x UUP, 1 x Independent
1985-1989 Change: Independent gain from DUP

Braid Valley - 5 seats
Party	Candidate	FPv%	Count					
Party	Candidate	FPv%	1	2	3	4	5	6
UUP	Desmond Armstrong*	18.78%	957					
Independent	James Woulahan	17.41%	887					
UUP	Margaret Alexander*	15.60%	795	848.02	864.49			
DUP	John Armstrong*	10.00%	510	526.39	527.2	528.82	852.94	
DUP	Samuel Hanna*	13.19%	672	676.07	677.96	677.96	697.89	790.39
DUP	Agnes McLeister	9.95%	507	507.66	507.66	508.2	537.18	625.5
UUP	William Owens	7.30%	372	394	406.15	413.71	430.64	
DUP	Robert Robinson	7.75%	395	399.73	404.32	404.32		
Electorate: 8,336 Valid: 5,095 (61.12%) Spoilt: 116 Quota: 850 Turnout: 5,211 (62.51%)

=== Kells Water ===
1985: 5 x DUP, 1 x UUP
1989: 4 x DUP, 2 x UUP
1985-1989 Change: UUP gain from DUP

Kells Water - 6 seats
Party	Candidate	FPv%	Count			
Party	Candidate	FPv%	1	2	3	4
UUP	William Brownlees*	20.48%	929			
DUP	Martin Clarke*	16.73%	759			
UUP	James Currie	16.07%	729			
DUP	Ronald Fry	11.28%	512	581.66	661.01	
DUP	David McClintock*	11.22%	509	556.3	565	623.12
DUP	James McCosh	11.00%	499	536.41	546.16	585.25
DUP	Andrew McKendry	8.40%	381	410.24	416.39	489.44
Ind. Unionist	Melvyn McKendry	4.83%	219	315.32	318.92	
Electorate: 10,142 Valid: 4,537 (44.73%) Spoilt: 138 Quota: 649 Turnout: 4,675 (46.10%)

=== The Main ===
1985: 4 x DUP, 1 x UUP
1989: 4 x DUP, 1 x UUP
1985-1989 Change: No change

The Main - 5 seats
Party	Candidate	FPv%	Count						
Party	Candidate	FPv%	1	2	3	4	5	6	7
DUP	Roy Gillespie*	19.54%	1,068						
UUP	Ian Johnston*	10.94%	598	608.5	628.65	780.8	1,072.25		
DUP	Sandy Spence*	13.76%	752	773.75	788.05	816.8	857.45	918.75	
DUP	Tommy Nicholl*	13.71%	749	761.15	770.15	791.45	811.75	819.75	891.9
DUP	Hubert Nicholl*	9.61%	525	626.7	628.7	649.6	673.65	694.65	777.45
SDLP	Seamus Laverty	11.45%	626	626	626	632	632.15	632.15	691.3
Alliance	David Alderdice	8.20%	448	451	458	465.15	481.6	517.6	
UUP	Robert Megaw	4.72%	258	262.2	342.2	402.35			
UUP	Sarah McCullough	5.32%	291	293.85	308.85				
UUP	John Sutter	2.74%	150	150.45					
Electorate: 9,076 Valid: 5,465 (60.21%) Spoilt: 118 Quota: 911 Turnout: 5,583 (61.51%)
