= Ballymena Area A =

District electoral areas in Ballymena, Northern Ireland

Ballymena Area A was one of the four district electoral areas in Ballymena, Northern Ireland which existed from 1973 to 1985. The district elected four members to Ballymena Borough Council, and formed part of the North Antrim constituencies for the Northern Ireland Assembly and UK Parliament.

It was created for the 1973 local elections, and contained the wards of Broughshane, Craigywarren, Glenravel and Slemish. It was abolished for the 1985 local elections and replaced by the Braid Valley DEA.

== Councillors ==
Election	Councillor (Party)	Councillor (Party)	Councillor (Party)	Councillor (Party)
1981	John Armstrong (DUP)	Samuel Hanna (DUP)	Desmond Armstrong (UUP)	James Woulahan (Independent)
1977	William Turtle (DUP)	James Millar (DUP)	Thomas Hume (UUP)	James Woulahan (Independent)
1973	William Wilson (DUP)	Thomas McCaughey (UUP)	Thomas Hume (UUP)	Clifford Davison (Independent Unionist)

== 1981 Election ==
1977: 2 x DUP, 1 x UUP, 1 x Independent

1981: 2 x DUP, 1 x UUP, 1 x Independent

1977-1981 Change: No change

Ballymena Area A - 4 seats
Party	Candidate	FPv%	Count			
Party	Candidate	FPv%	1	2	3	4
UUP	Desmond Armstrong	22.71%	964			
DUP	John Armstrong	19.39%	823	945		
DUP	Samuel Hanna	13.74%	583	842	852.32	
Independent	James Woulahan*	19.42%	824	826	826.48	827.48
UUP	James McKay	15.08%	640	656	754.52	798.52
DUP	James Millar*	9.66%	410			
Electorate: 5,861 Valid: 4,244 (72.41%) Spoilt: 121 Quota: 549 Turnout: 4,365 (74.48%)

== 1977 Election ==
1973: 2 x UUP, 1 x DUP, 1 x Independent

1977: 2 x DUP, 1 x UUP, 1 x Independent

1973-1977 Change: DUP gain from UUP

Ballymena Area A - 4 seats
Party	Candidate	FPv%	Count		
Party	Candidate	FPv%	1	2	3
Independent	James Woulahan	21.93%	784		
DUP	William Turtle	20.28%	725		
DUP	James Millar	20.03%	584	716	
UUP	Thomas Hume*	14.43%	516	531	698
UUP	Thomas McCaughey*	13.87%	496	498	589
Ind. Unionist	Lyle Cubitt	8.62%	308	315	
Ind. Unionist	William Wilson*	4.53%	162		
Electorate: 5,986 Valid: 3,575 (59.72%) Spoilt: 79 Quota: 716 Turnout: 3,654 (61.04%)

== 1973 Election ==
1973: 2 x UUP, 1 x DUP, 1 x Independent Unionist

Ballymena Area A - 4 seats
Party	Candidate	FPv%	Count					
Party	Candidate	FPv%	1	2	3	4	5	6
UUP	Thomas Hume	21.74%	934					
Ind. Unionist	Clifford Davison	20.81%	894					
UUP	Thomas McCaughey	14.87%	639	666	1,036			
DUP	William Wilson	13.64%	586	592	612	759.4	818.57	849.95
Independent	J. J. O'Hagan	17.99%	773	792	794	822.6	835.02	835.46
UUP	D. McCarthy	8.70%	374	409				
Alliance	S. O. Nesbitt	2.26%	97					
Electorate: 6,576 Valid: 4,297 (65.34%) Spoilt: 57 Quota: 860 Turnout: 4,354 (66.21%)
