= 1973 Ballymena Borough Council election =

Local government election in Northern Ireland

30 May 1973	1977 →

All 21 seats to Ballymena Borough Council 11 seats needed for a majority
	First party	Second party	Third party
Party	UUP	DUP	Ind. Unionist
Seats won	9	5	3
	Fourth party	Fifth party	Sixth party
Party	Independent	Alliance	Vanguard
Seats won	2	1	1

Elections to Ballymena Borough Council were held on 30 May 1973 on the same day as the other Northern Irish local government elections. The election used four district electoral areas to elect a total of 21 councillors.

== Election results ==
Party	Seats	±	First Pref. votes	FPv%	±%
UUP	9		8,688	37.9%	
DUP	5		5,607	37.9%	
Ind. Unionist	3		2,142	9.3%	
Independent	2		3,324	14.5%	
Alliance	1		1,469	6.4%	
Vanguard	1		1,276	5.6%	
NI Labour	0		438	1.9%	
Totals	21		22,944	100.0%	—

== Districts summary ==
Results of the Ballymena Borough Council election, 1973 by district
Ward	%	Cllrs	%	Cllrs	%	Cllrs	%	Cllrs	%	Cllrs	Total Cllrs
Ward	UUP		DUP		Alliance		Vanguard		Others		Total Cllrs
Area A	45.3	2	13.6	1	2.3	0	0.0	0	38.8	1	4
Area B	16.0	1	39.1	2	5.3	0	0.0	0	39.6	3	6
Area C	40.9	3	18.4	1	4.5	0	22.4	1	13.8	0	5
Area D	50.8	3	22.8	1	11.7	1	0.0	0	14.7	1	6
Total	37.9	9	24.2	5	6.4	1	5.6	1	25.9	5	21

== Districts results ==
=== Area A ===
1973: 2 x UUP, 1 x DUP, 1 x Independent Unionist

Ballymena Area A - 4 seats
Party	Candidate	FPv%	Count					
Party	Candidate	FPv%	1	2	3	4	5	6
UUP	Thomas Hume	21.74%	934					
Ind. Unionist	Clifford Davison	20.81%	894					
UUP	Thomas McCaughey	14.87%	639	666	1,036			
DUP	William Wilson	13.64%	586	592	612	759.4	818.57	849.95
Independent	J. J. O'Hagan	17.99%	773	792	794	822.6	835.02	835.46
UUP	D. McCarthy	8.70%	374	409				
Alliance	S. O. Nesbitt	2.26%	97					
Electorate: 6,576 Valid: 4,297 (65.34%) Spoilt: 57 Quota: 860 Turnout: 4,354 (66.21%)

=== Area B ===
1973: 2 x UUP, 2 x Independent Unionist, 1 x DUP, 1 x Independent

Ballymena Area B - 4 seats
Party	Candidate	FPv%	Count					
Party	Candidate	FPv%	1	2	3	4	5	6
Independent	A. Simpson	22.30%	1,390					
DUP	Sandy Spence	20.07%	1,251					
DUP	Roy Gillespie	19.06%	1,188					
UUP	W. Dickey	11.78%	734	930.8				
Ind. Unionist	Hugh Simpson	7.49%	467	541	648.3	728.34	814.64	894.12
Ind. Unionist	Thomas Smyth	6.03%	376	431.6	504.1	607.6	693.1	786.54
UUP	W. O. Given	4.19%	261	305.8	433.98	481.36	569.28	685.18
Alliance	Maeve Kyle	5.30%	330	398.4	413.48	420.38	435.78	
Independent	W. R. McNeilly	3.77%	235	291	324.64	378		
Electorate: 9,474 Valid: 6,232 (65.78%) Spoilt: 61 Quota: 891 Turnout: 6,293 (66.42%)

=== Area C ===
1973: 3 x UUP, 1 x DUP, 1 x Vanguard

Ballymena Area C - 5 seats
Party	Candidate	FPv%	Count										
Party	Candidate	FPv%	1	2	3	4	5	6	7	8	9	10	11
Vanguard	David Allen	20.65%	1,169										
DUP	John McAuley	18.35%	1,039										
UUP	George Sloane	17.20%	974										
UUP	A. Hyndman	8.76%	496	514.24	521.17	525.69	551.96	559.58	616.08	621.47	687.04	750.6	823.03
UUP	W. McWilliams	8.21%	465	477.92	484.58	489.15	513.53	523.58	565.82	570.23	639.26	693.06	744.59
UUP	F. McNeill	6.73%	381	390.88	394.03	394.22	416.31	421.68	437.53	438.56	491.07	524.02	566.39
Alliance	M. M. McAleese	4.49%	254	255.33	255.33	259.33	265.33	265.93	272.14	418.23	449.66	453.36	
Vanguard	Elizabeth Roulton	1.89%	107	264.51	329.04	329.23	348.44	349.7	377.8	382.08	400.1		
Ind. Unionist	William Simpson	3.74%	212	216.37	218.62	219.8	241.74	243.9	274.19	298.19			
NI Labour	F. R. Kelly	3.06%	173	174.14	174.5	213.59	226.59	226.71	238.86				
Ind. Unionist	Robert McCosh	3.41%	193	199.84	205.87	206.96	211.15	212.92					
Independent	J. Montgomery	2.54%	144	147.23	148.67	149.67							
NI Labour	B. Galbraith	0.97%	55	57.85	58.21								
Electorate: 9,068 Valid: 5,662 (62.44%) Spoilt: 89 Quota: 944 Turnout: 5,751 (63.42%)

=== Area D ===
1973: 3 x UUP, 1 x DUP, 1 x Alliance, 1 x Independent

Ballymena Area D - 6 seats
Party	Candidate	FPv%	Count								
Party	Candidate	FPv%	1	2	3	4	5	6	7	8	9
UUP	Samuel Henry	34.37%	2,321								
DUP	Maurice Mills	19.81%	1,338								
Independent	Patrick Burke	11.58%	782	823.18	826.54	903.82	907.82	955.46	967.36		
UUP	R. L. D. Pinkerton	2.71%	183	555.94	574.98	579.58	625.38	653.44	912.32	1,065.32	
UUP	David Thompson	5.29%	357	663.24	678.64	688.96	790.46	813.4	890.72	1,063.72	
Alliance	J. O'Mullan	7.48%	505	527.04	528.72	577.58	580.9	770.64	804.86	830.76	????
DUP	H. S. Roulton	3.04%	205	266.48	574.2	584.22	594.58	597.86	617.8	694.34	????
UUP	J. D. Walker	4.07%	275	420	427	429.58	517.1	531.26	565.92		
UUP	John Magaughin	1.91%	129	368.54	376.66	388	416.36	428.68			
Alliance	Phyllis Doloughan	4.19%	283	297.5	298.06	339.34	346.36				
UUP	Dorothy Smith	2.44%	165	283.32	287.8	292.68					
NI Labour	S. McQuiston	1.64%	111	126.08	127.2						
NI Labour	J. A. Rooney	1.47%	99	99	100.96						
Electorate: 10,323 Valid: 6,753 (65.42%) Spoilt: 91 Quota: 965 Turnout: 6,844 (66.30%)

- Data missing from stage 9
