= Ballymena Area C =

District electoral areas in Ballymena, Northern Ireland

Ballymena Area C was one of the four district electoral areas in Ballymena, Northern Ireland which existed from 1973 to 1985. The district elected five members to Ballymena Borough Council, and formed part of the North Antrim constituencies for the Northern Ireland Assembly and UK Parliament.

It was created for the 1973 local elections, and contained the wards of Ballee, Ballykeel, Glenwhirry, Harryville and Kells. It was abolished for the 1985 local elections and replaced by the Kells Water DEA.

== Councillors ==
Election	Councillor (Party)	Councillor (Party)	Councillor (Party)	Councillor (Party)	Councillor (Party)
1981	John McAuley (DUP)	Roy West (DUP)	Martin Clarke (DUP)	Edwin Maternaghan (DUP)	William Brownlees (UUP)
1977	John McAuley (DUP)	Desmond McBurney (DUP)	Albert Young (DUP)	George Sloane (Independent Unionist)/ (UUP)	David Allen (Independent Unionist)/ (Vanguard)
1973	John McAuley (DUP)	A. Hyndman (UUP)	W. McWilliams (UUP)	George Sloane (Independent Unionist)/ (UUP)	David Allen (Independent Unionist)/ (Vanguard)

== 1981 Election ==
1977: 3 x DUP, 2 x Independent Unionist

1981: 4 x DUP, 1 x UUP

1977-1981 Change: DUP and UUP gain from Independent Unionist (two seats)

Ballymena Area C - 5 seats
Party	Candidate	FPv%	Count			
Party	Candidate	FPv%	1	2	3	4
DUP	Roy West	19.43%	1,082			
DUP	Martin Clarke	17.56%	978			
UUP	William Brownlees	14.63%	815	953		
DUP	Edwin Maternaghan	14.81%	825	839	953.8	
DUP	John McAuley*	14.81%	825	846	870.22	915.62
UUP	William Simpson	12.46%	694	844	851.14	852.94
UUP	William McConnell	4.36%	243			
UUUP	Ernest Johnston	1.94%	108			
Electorate: 9,902 Valid: 5,570 (56.25%) Spoilt: 143 Quota: 929 Turnout: 5,713 (57.70%)

== 1977 Election ==
1973: 3 x UUP, 1 x DUP, 1 x Vanguard

1977: 3 x DUP, 2 x Independent Unionist

1973-1977 Change: DUP gain from UUP, Independent Unionists (two seats) leave UUP and Vanguard

Ballymena Area C - 5 seats
Party	Candidate	FPv%	Count					
Party	Candidate	FPv%	1	2	3	4	5	6
DUP	John McAuley*	22.61%	928					
Ind. Unionist	George Sloane*	20.71%	850					
DUP	Desmond McBurney	18.56%	762					
Ind. Unionist	David Allen*	15.47%	635	653.34	716.36			
DUP	Albert Young	9.33%	383	589.82	593.81	658.41	677.66	678.92
UUP	William Simpson	7.87%	323	327.59	376.94	381.04	583.55	612.39
UUP	Robert McCosh	5.46%	224	236.96	285.05	288.75		
Electorate: 9,789 Valid: 4,105 (41.93%) Spoilt: 183 Quota: 685 Turnout: 4,288 (43.80%)

== 1973 Election ==
1973: 3 x UUP, 1 x DUP, 1 x Vanguard

Ballymena Area C - 5 seats
Party	Candidate	FPv%	Count										
Party	Candidate	FPv%	1	2	3	4	5	6	7	8	9	10	11
Vanguard	David Allen	20.65%	1,169										
DUP	John McAuley	18.35%	1,039										
UUP	George Sloane	17.20%	974										
UUP	A. Hyndman	8.76%	496	514.24	521.17	525.69	551.96	559.58	616.08	621.47	687.04	750.6	823.03
UUP	W. McWilliams	8.21%	465	477.92	484.58	489.15	513.53	523.58	565.82	570.23	639.26	693.06	744.59
UUP	F. McNeill	6.73%	381	390.88	394.03	394.22	416.31	421.68	437.53	438.56	491.07	524.02	566.39
Alliance	M. M. McAleese	4.49%	254	255.33	255.33	259.33	265.33	265.93	272.14	418.23	449.66	453.36	
Vanguard	Elizabeth Roulton	1.89%	107	264.51	329.04	329.23	348.44	349.7	377.8	382.08	400.1		
Ind. Unionist	William Simpson	3.74%	212	216.37	218.62	219.8	241.74	243.9	274.19	298.19			
NI Labour	F. R. Kelly	3.06%	173	174.14	174.5	213.59	226.59	226.71	238.86				
Ind. Unionist	Robert McCosh	3.41%	193	199.84	205.87	206.96	211.15	212.92					
Independent	J. Montgomery	2.54%	144	147.23	148.67	149.67							
NI Labour	B. Galbraith	0.97%	55	57.85	58.21								
Electorate: 9,068 Valid: 5,662 (62.44%) Spoilt: 89 Quota: 944 Turnout: 5,751 (63.42%)
