= 1981 Ballymena Borough Council election =

Local government election in Northern Ireland

← 1977	20 May 1981	1985 →

All 21 seats to Ballymena Borough Council 11 seats needed for a majority
	First party	Second party	Third party
Party	DUP	UUP	Independent
Seats won	13	5	2
Seat change	▲2	▲1	0
	Fourth party	Fifth party
Party	Ind. Unionist	Alliance
Seats won	1	0
Seat change	▼2	▼1

Elections to Ballymena Borough Council were held on 20 May 1981 on the same day as the other Northern Irish local government elections. The election used four district electoral areas to elect a total of 21 councillors.

== Election results ==
Ballymena Borough Council Election Result 1981
Party	Seats	Gains	Losses	Net gain/loss	Seats %	Votes %	Votes	+/−
DUP	13	2	0	▲2	61.9	55.5	12,739	▲15.4
UUP	5	1	0	▲1	28.6	30.0	6,886	▼10.5
Independent	2	0	0	0	9.5	10.6	2,438	▼3.1
Ind. Unionist	1	0	2	▼2	4.8	3.4	790	▼18.0
UUUP	0	0	0	0	0.0	0.5	108	New

Note: "Votes" are the first preference votes.

== Districts summary ==
Results of the Ballymena Borough Council election, 1981 by district
Ward	%	Cllrs	%	Cllrs	%	Cllrs	Total Cllrs
Ward	DUP		UUP		Others		Total Cllrs
Area A	42.8	2	37.8	1	19.4	1	4
Area B	68.0	4	32.0	2	0.0	0	6
Area C	66.6	4	31.5	1	1.9	0	5
Area D	41.9	3	21.7	1	36.4	2	6
Total	55.5	13	30.0	5	14.5	3	21

== Districts results ==
=== Area A ===
1977: 2 x DUP, 1 x UUP, 1 x Independent
1981: 2 x DUP, 1 x UUP, 1 x Independent
1977-1981 Change: No change

Ballymena Area A - 4 seats
Party	Candidate	FPv%	Count			
Party	Candidate	FPv%	1	2	3	4
UUP	Desmond Armstrong	22.71%	964			
DUP	John Armstrong	19.39%	823	945		
DUP	Samuel Hanna	13.74%	583	842	852.32	
Independent	James Woulahan*	19.42%	824	826	826.48	827.48
UUP	James McKay	15.08%	640	656	754.52	798.52
DUP	James Millar*	9.66%	410			
Electorate: 5,861 Valid: 4,244 (72.41%) Spoilt: 121 Quota: 549 Turnout: 4,365 (74.48%)

=== Area B ===
1977: 4 x DUP, 2 x UUP
1981: 4 x DUP, 2 x UUP
1977-1981 Change: No change

Ballymena Area B - 6 seats
Party	Candidate	FPv%	Count								
Party	Candidate	FPv%	1	2	3	4	5	6	7	8	9
DUP	Roy Gillespie*	19.20%	1,254								
DUP	Sandy Spence*	15.02%	981								
DUP	John Greer*	13.06%	853	1,075.3							
UUP	Hugh Simpson*	8.22%	537	538.56	539.52	590.52	593.12	793.19	1,109.19		
UUP	William Wright*	7.10%	464	474.14	474.78	605.56	608.91	661.68	807.62	972.07	
DUP	Tommy Nicholl	11.33%	740	763.66	771.34	793.34	824.04	831.75	844.29	848.19	860.54
DUP	Hubert Nicholl*	9.43%	616	649.02	765.82	765.82	773.67	794.06	830.53	835.08	853.93
UUP	Robert Nelson	6.33%	413	431.2	438.88	473.88	474.73	561.18			
UUP	Thomas Smyth	6.16%	402	409.8	410.28	435.28	436.93				
UUP	John Sutter	4.15%	271	272.04	272.04						
Electorate: 9,994 Valid: 6,531 (65.35%) Spoilt: 240 Quota: 934 Turnout: 6,771 (67.75%)

=== Area C ===
1977: 3 x DUP, 2 x Independent Unionist
1981: 4 x DUP, 1 x UUP
1977-1981 Change: DUP and UUP gain from Independent Unionist (two seats)

Ballymena Area C - 5 seats
Party	Candidate	FPv%	Count			
Party	Candidate	FPv%	1	2	3	4
DUP	Roy West	19.43%	1,082			
DUP	Martin Clarke	17.56%	978			
UUP	William Brownlees	14.63%	815	953		
DUP	Edwin Maternaghan	14.81%	825	839	953.8	
DUP	John McAuley*	14.81%	825	846	870.22	915.62
UUP	William Simpson	12.46%	694	844	851.14	852.94
UUP	William McConnell	4.36%	243			
UUUP	Ernest Johnston	1.94%	108			
Electorate: 9,902 Valid: 5,570 (56.25%) Spoilt: 143 Quota: 929 Turnout: 5,713 (57.70%)

=== Area D ===
1977: 2 x DUP, 1 x UUP, 1 x Alliance, 1 x Independent, 1 x Independent Unionist
1981: 3 x DUP, 1 x UUP, 1 x Independent, 1 x Independent Unionist
1977-1981 Change: DUP gain from Alliance

Ballymena Area D - 6 seats
Party	Candidate	FPv%	Count						
Party	Candidate	FPv%	1	2	3	4	5	6	7
Independent	Patrick Burke*	20.12%	1,331						
DUP	Maurice Mills*	16.82%	1,113						
Ind. Unionist	Samuel Henry*	11.94%	790	972.35					
DUP	James Alexander*	13.57%	898	900.1	983.2				
UUP	Gordon Wilson	8.27%	547	553.65	558.45	558.87	560.91	803.69	917.34
DUP	Robert Maternaghan	11.46%	758	758.7	824.55	860.25	860.31	868.8	893.26
UUP	Kenneth Wood	7.57%	501	524.1	527.25	527.6	530.96	662.67	802.89
Independent	Samuel Barr	4.28%	283	434.2	436.9	437.18	455.9	472.22	
UUP	James Rainey	5.97%	395	408.65	413.75	414.1	415.3		
Electorate: 11,475 Valid: 6,616 (57.66%) Spoilt: 139 Quota: 946 Turnout: 6,755 (58.87%)
