= Ulster Teachers' Union =

Trade union in Northern Ireland

The Ulster Teachers' Union is a trade union based in Northern Ireland, whose membership comprises nursery, primary, and secondary school teachers and school leaders working in the state sector. It has 6,429 members. The UTU has close links with the Irish National Teachers Organisation, Educational Institute of Scotland and the National Education Union.

The union was founded in 1919 and for many years identified strongly with the United Kingdom, therefore not affiliating with the Irish Trades Union Congress. Although the affiliation with ICTU did occur in the 1980s. For many years the Ulster Teachers’ Union was the largest teaching union in Northern Ireland.

== General Secretaries ==
1919–1942: Joseph Smith
1942–1970: Joseph King-Carson
1970–1978: Brian Toms
1978–1997: David Allen
1997–2004: Ray Calvin
2004–2019: Avril Hall-Callaghan
2019–present: Jacquie White
