= Ballymena Town (District Electoral Area) =

District electoral areas in Ballymena, Northern Ireland

Ballymena Town was one of the four district electoral areas in Ballymena, Northern Ireland which existed from 1985 to 1993. The district elected seven members to Ballymena Borough Council, and formed part of the North Antrim constituency for the Northern Ireland Assembly.

It was created for the 1985 local elections, replacing Ballymena Area D which had existed since 1973, and contained the wards of Ardeevin, Ballyloughan, Castle Demesne, Dunclug, Fair Green, Park and Summerfield. It was abolished for the 1993 local elections, with Ardeevin, Ballyloughan, Dunclug, Fair Green and Park moving to the new Ballymena North DEA and Castle Demesne and Summerfield moving to the new Ballymena South DEA.

== Councillors ==
Election	Councillor (Party)	Councillor (Party)	Councillor (Party)	Councillor (Party)	Councillor (Party)	Councillor (Party)	Councillor (Party)
1989	Patrick McAvoy (SDLP)	Gareth Williams (Alliance)	John Wilson (DUP)	Maurice Mills (DUP)	James Alexander (UUP)	Robert Coulter (UUP)	Samuel Henry (Independent Unionist)
1985	Patrick McAvoy (SDLP)	Richard McKeown (DUP)	Robert Maternaghan (DUP)	Maurice Mills (DUP)	Gordon Wilson (UUP)	Robert Coulter (UUP)	Samuel Henry (Independent Unionist)

== 1989 Election ==
1985: 3 x DUP, 2 x UUP, 1 x SDLP, 1 x Independent Unionist

1989: 2 x DUP, 2 x UUP, 1 x SDLP, 1 x Alliance, 1 x Independent Unionist

1985-1989 Change: Alliance gain from DUP

Ballymena Town - 7 seats
Party	Candidate	FPv%	Count							
Party	Candidate	FPv%	1	2	3	4	5	6	7	8
SDLP	Patrick McAvoy*	15.06%	897							
Alliance	Gareth Williams	13.97%	832							
Ind. Unionist	Samuel Henry*	13.67%	814							
UUP	James Alexander	10.60%	631	631.17	651.32	668.06	750.12			
DUP	Maurice Mills*	8.14%	485	485	488.12	495.14	501.99	724.64	969.75	
UUP	Robert Coulter*	9.99%	595	595	612.55	631.54	738.14	743.49	784.65	
DUP	John Wilson	7.42%	442	442	445.51	447.94	451.88	466.06	592.47	783.26
SDLP	Declan O'Loan	6.77%	403	553.45	573.34	576.04	580.65	581.65	582.65	585.65
DUP	John Carson	6.87%	409	409	410.69	413.12	416.87	433.05		
DUP	Vera Mills	4.38%	261	261.34	261.99	263.52	264.01			
UUP	Robert Simpson	3.12%	186	186	204.2	220.13				
Electorate: 12,831 Valid: 5,955 (46.41%) Spoilt: 130 Quota: 745 Turnout: 6,085 (47.42%)

== 1985 Election ==
1985: 3 x DUP, 2 x UUP, 1 x SDLP, 1 x Independent Unionist

Ballymena Town - 7 seats
Party	Candidate	FPv%	Count						
Party	Candidate	FPv%	1	2	3	4	5	6	7
SDLP	Patrick McAvoy	17.33%	1,126						
Ind. Unionist	Samuel Henry*	13.48%	876						
UUP	Robert Coulter	12.22%	794	794.28	807.58	886.58			
UUP	Gordon Wilson*	6.20%	403	403.56	419.17	581.16	711.3	775.3	841.22
DUP	Maurice Mills*	10.89%	708	708.28	711.71	722.99	753.18	756.18	764
DUP	Richard McKeown	9.85%	640	640.84	642.94	644.08	677.99	679.99	691.12
DUP	Robert Maternaghan*	8.66%	563	563.28	566.22	571.36	635.41	637.41	639.32
DUP	John Wilson	8.28%	538	538	539.33	550.89	589.45	591.45	600.37
SDLP	Malachy Reynolds	3.71%	241	550.12	552.29	555.43	565.99	565.99	
Ind. Unionist	James Alexander*	5.05%	328	329.4	340.67	352.72			
UUP	Warren Wray	4.34%	282	282	288.72				
Electorate: 12,497 Valid: 6,499 (52.00%) Spoilt: 105 Quota: 813 Turnout: 6,604 (52.84%)
