= The Main (District Electoral Area) =

District electoral areas in Ballymena, Northern Ireland

The Main was one of the four district electoral areas in Ballymena, Northern Ireland which existed from 1985 to 1993. The district elected five members to Ballymena Borough Council, and formed part of the North Antrim constituency for the Northern Ireland Assembly.

It was created for the 1985 local elections, replacing Ballymena Area B which had existed since 1973, and contained the wards of Ahoghill, Cullybackey, Galgorm, Grange and Portglenone. It was abolished for the 1993 local elections, and mostly replaced with the new Bannside DEA with Galgorm moving to the new Ballymena North DEA.

== Councillors ==
Election	Councillor (Party)	Councillor (Party)	Councillor (Party)	Councillor (Party)	Councillor (Party)
1989	Ian Johnston (UUP)	Roy Gillespie (DUP)	Sandy Spence (DUP)	Tommy Nicholl (DUP)	Hubert Nicholl (DUP)
1985	Ian Johnston (UUP)	Roy Gillespie (DUP)	Sandy Spence (DUP)	Tommy Nicholl (DUP)	Hubert Nicholl (DUP)

== 1989 Election ==
1985: 4 x DUP, 1 x UUP

1989: 4 x DUP, 1 x UUP

1985-1989 Change: No change

The Main - 5 seats
Party	Candidate	FPv%	Count						
Party	Candidate	FPv%	1	2	3	4	5	6	7
DUP	Roy Gillespie*	19.54%	1,068						
UUP	Ian Johnston*	10.94%	598	608.5	628.65	780.8	1,072.25		
DUP	Sandy Spence*	13.76%	752	773.75	788.05	816.8	857.45	918.75	
DUP	Tommy Nicholl*	13.71%	749	761.15	770.15	791.45	811.75	819.75	891.9
DUP	Hubert Nicholl*	9.61%	525	626.7	628.7	649.6	673.65	694.65	777.45
SDLP	Seamus Laverty	11.45%	626	626	626	632	632.15	632.15	691.3
Alliance	David Alderdice	8.20%	448	451	458	465.15	481.6	517.6	
UUP	Robert Megaw	4.72%	258	262.2	342.2	402.35			
UUP	Sarah McCullough	5.32%	291	293.85	308.85				
UUP	John Sutter	2.74%	150	150.45					
Electorate: 9,076 Valid: 5,465 (60.21%) Spoilt: 118 Quota: 911 Turnout: 5,583 (61.51%)

== 1985 Election ==
1985: 4 x DUP, 1 x UUP

The Main - 5 seats
Party	Candidate	FPv%	Count			
Party	Candidate	FPv%	1	2	3	4
DUP	Roy Gillespie*	21.36%	1,076			
DUP	Tommy Nicholl*	19.06%	960			
DUP	Sandy Spence*	15.80%	796	831.64	925.48	
DUP	Hubert Nicholl	12.57%	633	792.94	804.7	876.75
UUP	Ian Johnston*	16.12%	812	834.88	838.24	841.76
UUP	William Wright*	15.09%	760	774.08	777.92	782.43
Electorate: 8,309 Valid: 5,037 (60.62%) Spoilt: 213 Quota: 840 Turnout: 5,250 (63.18%)
