= Braid Valley (District Electoral Area) =

District electoral areas in Ballymena, Northern Ireland

Braid Valley was one of the four district electoral areas in Ballymena, Northern Ireland which existed from 1985 to 1993. The district elected five members to Ballymena Borough Council, and formed part of the North Antrim constituency for the Northern Ireland Assembly.

It was created for the 1985 local elections, replacing Ballymena Area A which had existed since 1973, and contained the wards of Broughshane, Craigywarren, Dunminning, Glenravel and Slemish. It was abolished for the 1993 local elections, and replaced with the new Braid DEA.

== Councillors ==
Election	Councillor (Party)	Councillor (Party)	Councillor (Party)	Councillor (Party)	Councillor (Party)
1989	Desmond Armstrong (UUP)	Margaret Alexander (UUP)	John Armstrong (DUP)	Samuel Hanna (DUP)	James Woulahan (Independent)
1985	Desmond Armstrong (UUP)	Margaret Alexander (UUP)	John Armstrong (DUP)	Samuel Hanna (DUP)	John Porter (DUP)

== 1989 Election ==
1985: 3 x DUP, 2 x UUP

1989: 2 x DUP, 2 x UUP, 1 x Independent

1985-1989 Change: Independent gain from DUP

Braid Valley - 5 seats
Party	Candidate	FPv%	Count					
Party	Candidate	FPv%	1	2	3	4	5	6
UUP	Desmond Armstrong*	18.78%	957					
Independent	James Woulahan	17.41%	887					
UUP	Margaret Alexander*	15.60%	795	848.02	864.49			
DUP	John Armstrong*	10.00%	510	526.39	527.2	528.82	852.94	
DUP	Samuel Hanna*	13.19%	672	676.07	677.96	677.96	697.89	790.39
DUP	Agnes McLeister	9.95%	507	507.66	507.66	508.2	537.18	625.5
UUP	William Owens	7.30%	372	394	406.15	413.71	430.64	
DUP	Robert Robinson	7.75%	395	399.73	404.32	404.32		
Electorate: 8,336 Valid: 5,095 (61.12%) Spoilt: 116 Quota: 850 Turnout: 5,211 (62.51%)

== 1985 Election ==
1985: 3 x DUP, 2 x UUP

Braid Valley - 5 seats
Party	Candidate	FPv%	Count						
Party	Candidate	FPv%	1	2	3	4	5	6	7
DUP	John Armstrong*	11.85%	628	981					
UUP	Margaret Alexander	11.81%	626	635	925				
UUP	Desmond Armstrong*	14.28%	757	794	921				
DUP	Samuel Hanna*	14.07%	746	787	829	850.33	869.58	892.2	
DUP	John Porter	13.66%	724	753	778	850.63	865.88	875.16	882.36
Independent	James Woulahan*	16.15%	856	857	860	860	865.25	869.89	870.79
UUP	Harbinson McCullough	9.24%	490	493					
DUP	Samuel Martin	8.94%	474						
Electorate: 7,829 Valid: 5,301 (67.71%) Spoilt: 110 Quota: 884 Turnout: 5,411 (69.11%)
