= Kells Water (District Electoral Area) =

District electoral areas in Ballymena, Northern Ireland

Kells Water was one of the four district electoral areas in Ballymena, Northern Ireland which existed from 1985 to 1993. The district elected six members to Ballymena Borough Council, and formed part of the North Antrim constituency for the Northern Ireland Assembly.

It was created for the 1985 local elections, replacing Ballymena Area C which had existed since 1973, and contained the wards of Ballee, Ballykeel, Glenwhirry, Harryville, Kells and Moat. It was abolished for the 1993 local elections, and mostly replaced with the new Ballymena South DEA with Glenwhirry moving to the new Braid DEA.

== Councillors ==
| Election | Councillor (party) | Councillor (party) | Councillor (party) | Councillor (party) | Councillor (party) | Councillor (party) |
|---|---|---|---|---|---|---|
| 1989 | William Brownlees (UUP) | James Currie (UUP) | Martin Clarke (DUP) | David McClintock (DUP) | James McCosh (DUP) | Ronald Fry (DUP) |
| 1985 | William Brownlees (UUP) | Roy West (DUP) | Martin Clarke (DUP) | David McClintock (DUP) | John McAuley (DUP) | Edwin Maternaghan (DUP) |

== 1989 election ==
1985: 5 x DUP, 1 x UUP

1989: 4 x DUP, 2 x UUP

1985-1989 change: UUP gain from DUP

Kells Water - 6 seats
| Party | Candidate | FPv% | Count | | | |
| Party | Candidate | FPv% | 1 | 2 | 3 | 4 |
|---|---|---|---|---|---|---|
| UUP | William Brownlees* | 20.48% | 929 | | | |
| DUP | Martin Clarke* | 16.73% | 759 | | | |
| UUP | James Currie | 16.07% | 729 | | | |
| DUP | Ronald Fry | 11.28% | 512 | 581.66 | 661.01 | |
| DUP | David McClintock* | 11.22% | 509 | 556.3 | 565 | 623.12 |
| DUP | James McCosh | 11.00% | 499 | 536.41 | 546.16 | 585.25 |
| DUP | Andrew McKendry | 8.40% | 381 | 410.24 | 416.39 | 489.44 |
| Ind. Unionist | Melvyn McKendry | 4.83% | 219 | 315.32 | 318.92 | |
Electorate: 10,142 Valid: 4,537 (44.73%) Spoilt: 138 Quota: 649 Turnout: 4,675 (46.10%)

== 1985 election ==
1985: 5 x DUP, 1 x UUP

Kells Water - 6 seats
| Party | Candidate | FPv% | Count | | | |
| Party | Candidate | FPv% | 1 | 2 | 3 | 4 |
|---|---|---|---|---|---|---|
| UUP | William Brownlees* | 17.86% | 856 | | | |
| DUP | John McAuley* | 17.63% | 845 | | | |
| DUP | Roy West* | 16.60% | 796 | | | |
| DUP | Martin Clarke* | 14.50% | 695 | | | |
| DUP | Edwin Maternaghan* | 12.04% | 577 | 586.4 | 693.37 | |
| DUP | David McClintock | 12.83% | 615 | 623.4 | 657.41 | 753.17 |
| UUP | Victoria Brownlees | 8.55% | 410 | 558.8 | 570.96 | 579.92 |
Electorate: 9,621 Valid: 4,794 (49.83%) Spoilt: 133 Quota: 685 Turnout: 4,927 (51.21%)
