= David Allen (politician) =

Member of Ballymena Borough Council
- In office 30 May 1973 – 20 May 1981
- Preceded by: Council established
- Succeeded by: William Brownlees
- Constituency: Ballymena Area C

Member of the Northern Ireland Constitutional Convention for North Antrim
- In office 1975–1976
- Preceded by: Convention established
- Succeeded by: Convention abolished

Personal details
- Born: 24 October 1937 Ballymena, Northern Ireland
- Died: 13 December 2011 (aged 74)
- Party: Independent Unionist (from 1977); Ulster Vanguard (before 1977)
- Occupation: Teacher Trade Unionist Politician

David Allen MBE (24 October 1937 – 13 December 2011) was a Northern Irish teacher, trade unionist and politician.

== Background ==
A member of the Vanguard Unionist Progressive Party, he represented the group in the Northern Ireland Constitutional Convention. He was elected to Ballymena Borough Council in 1973, topping the poll in the C District Electoral Area. He retained the seat in 1977, albeit as a "Ratepayers" candidate, having left the Vanguard in the interim.

In November 1976 Allen proposed a motion banning Ballymena's local Gaelic Athletic Association (GAA) from using council facilities; the motion passed unanimously. Allen described the GAA as "bigoted, sectarian" with an "antiquated" ruleset. In a television interview about the motion, Allen suggested he would be justified in calling for the GAA to be outlawed and made illegal in Northern Ireland.

Allen was a pupil of Ballymena Academy. A teacher by profession, he trained at Queen's University Belfast and Stranmillis College before teaching at primary level in his native Ballymena, initially at Harryville PS before moving to Ballykeel PS. Known to his pupils as "Duck", he was deputy headmaster at the latter school. Allen was active in the Ulster Teachers' Union and became general secretary of the body in 1978, holding the position for twenty years. A prominent media figure during his time in charge, Allen's work earned him the nickname "children's champion".

Allen was married twice and had one daughter. Following his retirement he settled in Banbridge, while also keeping a house in Cornwall. He suffered a stroke in 2011 and died soon after, aged 74. He was buried in Banbridge following a service at the town's Bannside Presbyterian Church.

Northern Ireland Constitutional Convention
New convention	Member for North Antrim; 1975–1976	Convention dissolved
Trade union offices
Preceded by Brian Toms	General Secretary of the Ulster Teachers' Union; 1978–1997	Succeeded by Ray Calvin
