= 1985 Ballymena Borough Council election =

Local government election in Northern Ireland

← 1981	15 May 1985	1989 →

All 23 seats to Ballymena Borough Council 12 seats needed for a majority
	First party	Second party	Third party
Party	DUP	UUP	SDLP
Seats won	15	6	1
Seat change	▲2	▲1	▲1
	Fourth party	Fifth party
Party	Ind. Unionist	Independent
Seats won	1	0
Seat change	0	▼2

Elections to Ballymena Borough Council were held on 15 May 1985 on the same day as the other Northern Irish local government elections. The election used four district electoral areas to elect a total of 23 councillors.

== Election results ==
Ballymena Borough Council Election Result 1985
Party	Seats	Gains	Losses	Net gain/loss	Seats %	Votes %	Votes	+/−
DUP	15	2	0	▲2	65.2	55.6	12,014	▲0.1
UUP	6	1	0	▲1	26.1	28.6	6,190	▼1.4
SDLP	1	1	0	▲1	4.3	6.3	1,367	New
Ind. Unionist	1	0	0	0	4.3	5.6	1,204	▲2.1
Independent	0	0	2	▼2	0.0	4.0	856	▼6.6

Note: "Votes" are the first preference votes.

== Districts summary ==
Results of the Ballymena Borough Council election, 1985 by district
Ward	%	Cllrs	%	Cllrs	%	Cllrs	%	Cllrs	Total Cllrs
Ward	DUP		UUP		SDLP		Others		Total Cllrs
Ballymena Town	37.7	3	22.8	2	21.0	1	18.5	1	7
Braid Valley	48.5	3	35.3	2	0.0	0	16.2	0	5
Kells Water	73.6	5	26.4	1	0.0	0	0.0	0	6
The Main	68.8	4	31.2	1	0.0	0	0.0	0	5
Total	55.6	15	28.6	6	6.3	1	9.5	2	23

== District results ==
=== Ballymena Town ===
1985: 3 x DUP, 2 x UUP, 1 x SDLP, 1 x Independent Unionist

Ballymena Town - 7 seats
Party	Candidate	FPv%	Count						
Party	Candidate	FPv%	1	2	3	4	5	6	7
SDLP	Patrick McAvoy	17.33%	1,126						
Ind. Unionist	Samuel Henry*	13.48%	876						
UUP	Robert Coulter	12.22%	794	794.28	807.58	886.58			
UUP	Gordon Wilson*	6.20%	403	403.56	419.17	581.16	711.3	775.3	841.22
DUP	Maurice Mills*	10.89%	708	708.28	711.71	722.99	753.18	756.18	764
DUP	Richard McKeown	9.85%	640	640.84	642.94	644.08	677.99	679.99	691.12
DUP	Robert Maternaghan*	8.66%	563	563.28	566.22	571.36	635.41	637.41	639.32
DUP	John Wilson	8.28%	538	538	539.33	550.89	589.45	591.45	600.37
SDLP	Malachy Reynolds	3.71%	241	550.12	552.29	555.43	565.99	565.99	
Ind. Unionist	James Alexander*	5.05%	328	329.4	340.67	352.72			
UUP	Warren Wray	4.34%	282	282	288.72				
Electorate: 12,497 Valid: 6,499 (52.00%) Spoilt: 105 Quota: 813 Turnout: 6,604 (52.84%)

=== Braid Valley ===
1985: 3 x DUP, 2 x UUP

Braid Valley - 5 seats
Party	Candidate	FPv%	Count						
Party	Candidate	FPv%	1	2	3	4	5	6	7
DUP	John Armstrong*	11.85%	628	981					
UUP	Margaret Alexander	11.81%	626	635	925				
UUP	Desmond Armstrong*	14.28%	757	794	921				
DUP	Samuel Hanna*	14.07%	746	787	829	850.33	869.58	892.2	
DUP	John Porter	13.66%	724	753	778	850.63	865.88	875.16	882.36
Independent	James Woulahan*	16.15%	856	857	860	860	865.25	869.89	870.79
UUP	Harbinson McCullough	9.24%	490	493					
DUP	Samuel Martin	8.94%	474						
Electorate: 7,829 Valid: 5,301 (67.71%) Spoilt: 110 Quota: 884 Turnout: 5,411 (69.11%)

=== Kells Water ===
1985: 5 x DUP, 1 x UUP

Kells Water - 6 seats
Party	Candidate	FPv%	Count			
Party	Candidate	FPv%	1	2	3	4
UUP	William Brownlees*	17.86%	856			
DUP	John McAuley*	17.63%	845			
DUP	Roy West*	16.60%	796			
DUP	Martin Clarke*	14.50%	695			
DUP	Edwin Maternaghan*	12.04%	577	586.4	693.37	
DUP	David McClintock	12.83%	615	623.4	657.41	753.17
UUP	Victoria Brownlees	8.55%	410	558.8	570.96	579.92
Electorate: 9,621 Valid: 4,794 (49.83%) Spoilt: 133 Quota: 685 Turnout: 4,927 (51.21%)

=== The Main ===
1985: 4 x DUP, 1 x UUP

The Main - 5 seats
Party	Candidate	FPv%	Count			
Party	Candidate	FPv%	1	2	3	4
DUP	Roy Gillespie*	21.36%	1,076			
DUP	Tommy Nicholl*	19.06%	960			
DUP	Sandy Spence*	15.80%	796	831.64	925.48	
DUP	Hubert Nicholl	12.57%	633	792.94	804.7	876.75
UUP	Ian Johnston*	16.12%	812	834.88	838.24	841.76
UUP	William Wright*	15.09%	760	774.08	777.92	782.43
Electorate: 8,309 Valid: 5,037 (60.62%) Spoilt: 213 Quota: 840 Turnout: 5,250 (63.18%)
