= Robert Coulter (Northern Ireland politician) =

Northern Ireland politician (1929–2018)

Member of the Legislative Assembly for Antrim North
- In office 25 June 1998 – 5 May 2011
- Preceded by: New Creation
- Succeeded by: Robin Swann

Member of Ballymena Borough Council
- In office 19 May 1993 – 7 June 2001
- Preceded by: New district
- Succeeded by: Seamus Laverty
- Constituency: Bannside
- In office 15 May 1985 – 19 May 1993
- Preceded by: New district
- Succeeded by: District abolished
- Constituency: Ballymena Town

Member of the Northern Ireland Forum for North Antrim
- In office 30 May 1996 – 25 April 1998
- Preceded by: Forum created
- Succeeded by: Forum dissolved

Personal details
- Born: 23 October 1929 Stewartstown, County Tyrone, Northern Ireland
- Died: 5 September 2018 (aged 88)
- Party: Ulster Unionist Party
- Education: Trinity College, Dublin University of Ulster
- Profession: Clergyman

Robert Coulter, MBE (23 October 1929 – 5 September 2018) was an Ulster Unionist Party (UUP) politician who was a Member of the Legislative Assembly (MLA) for North Antrim from 1998 to 2011. He was a prominent proponent of unionism, and was the second oldest MLA after the Rev. Ian Paisley at the time of his retirement in 2011.

== Life and career ==
Between 1998 and 2011 he served as an Ulster Unionist Party MLA for North Antrim. Coulter was born in 1929, making him the second oldest MLA after the Rev. Ian Paisley.

He was educated at Ballymena College, Trinity College, Dublin and the University of Ulster.

He was married, with one son and one daughter. He was a retired Presbyterian minister and a former lecturer in religious studies at Belfast Institute for Further and Higher Education.

He was elected a Councillor for Ballymena Borough Council in 1985 and was Mayor of Ballymena from 1993 to 1996.

Coulter was elected Alderman of the Borough of Ballymena in 1996.

He was elected to represent the constituency of North Antrim in the Northern Ireland Forum for Political Dialogue (1996–1998)

At the 1998 Northern Ireland Assembly election, he was elected as an Ulster Unionist Party MLA for North Antrim. He was a member of the Health, Social Service and Public Safety Committee in the 1998-2003 Assembly.

Coulter was re-elected to his Assembly seat in 2007.

In 2010, the reverend Dr. Robert Coulter was honored for his public service with membership in the Civil Division of the Most Excellent Order of the British Empire.

Coulter did not put his name forward for the 2011 election in North Antrim, effectively retiring. He was in his 80s.

Coulter died on 5 September 2018, at the age of 88.

Civic offices
Preceded by Hubert Nicholl	Mayor of Ballymena; 1993–1996	Succeeded by James Currie
Northern Ireland Forum
New forum	Member for North Antrim; 1996–1998	Forum dissolved
Northern Ireland Assembly
New assembly	MLA for Antrim North; 1998–2011	Succeeded by Robin Swann
