= Traditional Unionist Voice election results =

Political party election results

This article lists the election results of the Traditional Unionist Voice (TUV) in UK elections. Candidates in bold were elected.

== General elections ==
=== General election 2010 ===
Constituency	Candidate	Votes	%
Belfast East	David Vance	1,856	5.4
East Antrim	Sammy Morrison	1,826	6.0
East Londonderry	William Ross	2,995	7.4
Lagan Valley	Keith Harbinson	3,154	8.6
Mid Ulster	Walter Millar	2,572	7.3
North Antrim	Jim Allister	7,114	16.8
North Down	Kaye Kilpatrick	1,634	4.9
South Antrim	Mel Lucas	1,829	5.4
South Down	Ivor McConnell	1,506	3.5
Strangford	Terry Williams	1,814	5.6

=== General election 2015 ===
Constituency	Candidate	Votes	%
East Antrim	Ruth Wilson	1,903	5.7
Lagan Valley	Samuel Morrison	1,887	4.7
Mid Ulster	Gareth Ferguson	1,892	4.6
North Antrim	Timothy Gaston	6,561	15.7
North Down	William Cudworth	686	1.9
South Antrim	Rick Cairns	1,908	5.2
Strangford	Stephen Cooper	1,701	5.0

=== General election 2017 ===
Constituency	Candidate	Votes	%
North Antrim	Timothy Gaston	3,282	6.8

=== General election 2024 ===
The TUV formed an alliance with Reform UK, and stood mutually agreed candidates.

Constituency	Candidate	Votes	%
Belfast East	John Ross	1,918	4.5
Belfast North	David Clarke	2,877	7.1
Belfast South and Mid Down	Dan Boucher	2,218	5.1
Belfast West	Ann McClure	2,010	5.1
East Antrim	Matthew Warwick	4,135	10.4
East Londonderry	Allister Kyle	4,363	10.6
Lagan Valley	Lorna Smyth	2,186	4.5
Mid Ulster	Glenn Moore	2,978	6.6
Newry and Armagh	Keith Ratcliffe	4,099	8.9
North Antrim	**Jim Allister**	11,642	28.3
South Antrim	Mel Lucas	2,693	6.3
South Down	Jim Wells	1,893	4.2
Strangford	Ron McDowell	3,143	8.1
West Tyrone	Stevan Patterson	2,530	5.8

== European Parliament elections ==
=== European election 2009 ===
Candidate	First pref. votes	%	Votes at elimination	Count eliminated
Jim Allister	66,197	13.7	70,481	2nd

=== European election 2014 ===
Candidate	First pref. votes	%	Votes at elimination	Count eliminated
Jim Allister	75,806	12.1	86,020	6th

=== European election 2019 ===
Candidate	First pref. votes	%	Votes at elimination	Count eliminated
Jim Allister	62,021	10.8	90,079	5th

== Northern Ireland Assembly elections ==
Election	Northern Ireland Assembly	Total votes	Share of votes	Seats	+/-	Government
2011	4th Assembly	16,480	2.49%	1 / 108	▲1	Opposition
2016	5th Assembly	23,776	3.42%	1 / 108	Steady	Opposition
2017	6th Assembly	20,523	2.55%	1 / 90	Steady	Opposition
2022	7th Assembly	65,788	7.63%	1 / 90	Steady	Opposition

=== 2011 Northern Ireland Assembly election ===
Constituency	Candidate	First pref. votes	%	Votes at elimination	Count eliminated
Belfast East	Harry Toan	712	2.2	824.39	7th
East Antrim	Ruth Wilson	1,346	4.6	1,653.84	4th
East Londonderry	Boyd Douglas	1,568	4.5	1,703.18	3rd
Fermanagh & South Tyrone	Alex Elliott	1,231	2.6	1,249.78	3rd
Lagan Valley	Lyle Rea	1,031	2.9	1,110.24	4th
Mid Ulster	Walter Millar	2,075	4.9	2,431.1	5th
Newry & Armagh	Barrie Halliday	830	1.8	1,239.7	4th
North Antrim	**Jim Allister**	4,061	10.1	5,429.99	9th (elected)
North Antrim	Audrey Patterson	668	1.7	670.4	2nd
South Antrim	Mel Lucas	1,091	3.4	1,091	1st
Strangford	Terry Williams	841	2.8	963.01	3rd
Upper Bann	David Vance	1,026	2.4	1,092.18	3rd

=== 2016 Northern Ireland Assembly election ===
Constituency	Candidate	First pref. votes	%	Votes at elimination	Count eliminated
Belfast East	Andrew Girvin	887	2.4	1,037.14	8th
Belfast North	John Miller	644	1.8	650.56	5th
Belfast South	John Hiddleston	495	1.4	685	7th
East Antrim	Ruth Wilson	1,643	5.1	1,795.59	7th
East Londonderry	Jordan Armstrong	1,191	3.5	1,291	3rd
Fermanagh & South Tyrone	Donald Crawford	1,164	2.5	1,381.95	3rd
Lagan Valley	Lyle Rea	1,291	3.3	1,518	5th
Mid Ulster	Hannah Loughrin	1,877	4.6	2,046.68	8th
North Antrim	**Jim Allister**	5,399	13.2	7,600	7th (elected)
North Antrim	Timothy Gaston	1,955	4.8	2,123	6th
North Down	John Brennan	610	1.9	650.76	6th
South Antrim	Richard Cairns	1,318	3.8	1,505	3rd
South Down	Henry Reilly	2,718	6.6	2,800	2nd
Strangford	Stephen Cooper	1,407	4.3	1,606	5th
Upper Bann	Roy Ferguson	1,177	2.6	1,707.82	8th

=== 2017 Northern Ireland Assembly election ===
Constituency	Candidate	First pref. votes	%	Votes at elimination	Count eliminated
Belfast East	Andrew Girvin	917	2.3	958.87	5th
Belfast South	John Hiddleston	703	1.6	724.48	4th
East Antrim	Ruth Wilson	1,534	4.2	1,587	2nd
East Londonderry	Jordan Armstrong	1,038	2.5	1,147	4th
Fermanagh & South Tyrone	Alex Elliott	780	1.5	780	1st
Lagan Valley	Samuel Morrison	1,389	3.1	1,448	5th
Mid Ulster	Hannah Loughrin	1,244	2.5	1,692.84	3rd
North Antrim	**Jim Allister**	6,214	12.9	7,989	7th (elected)
North Antrim	Timothy Gaston	1,505	3.1	1,509	3rd
South Antrim	Richard Cairns	1,353	3.2	1,409	4th
South Down	Lyle Rea	630	1.3	630	1st
Strangford	Stephen Cooper	1,330	3.4	1,373	4th
Upper Bann	Roy Ferguson	1,035	2.0	1,035	1st
West Tyrone	Charlie Chittick	851	1.9	1,428.97	4th

=== 2022 Northern Ireland Assembly election ===
Constituency	Candidate	First pref. votes	%	Votes at elimination	Count eliminated
Belfast East	John Ross	3,087	7.1	3,426.32	10th
Belfast North	Ron McDowell	3,335	7.2	4,261.41	10th
Belfast South	Andrew Girvin	1,935	4.1	1,979.9	4th
Belfast West	Jordan Doran	802	1.8	918.38	7th
East Antrim	Norman Boyd	3,661	9.1	4,467.30	5th
East Londonderry	Jordan Armstrong	2,959	6.7	3,737	7th
Fermanagh & South Tyrone	Alex Elliott	3,091	5.8	3,351.06	5th
Foyle	Elizabeth Neely	499	1.1	501.84	4th
Lagan Valley	Lorna Smyth	3,488	6.8	4,575.8	6th
Mid Ulster	Glenn Moore	3,818	7.4	5,365	8th
Newry and Armagh	Keith Ratcliffe	5,407	9.2	6,892	5th
North Antrim	**Jim Allister**	8,282	16.4	8,625.99	5th (elected)
North Antrim	Matthew Armstrong	2,481	4.9	2,726.27	5th
North Down	John Gordon	1,574	3.8	2,098.1	7th
South Antrim	Mel Lucas	4,371	9.6	4,660.85	4th
South Down	Harold McKee	3,273	6.0	4,117.97	5th
Strangford	Stephen Cooper	5,186	12.7	5,924.01	9th
Upper Bann	Darrin Foster	4,373	7.8	4,626	4th
West Tyrone	Trevor Clarke	4,166	9.1	4,884.55	7th

== Local elections ==
=== 2011 Northern Ireland local elections ===
Council	Electoral area	Candidate	First pref. votes	%	Votes at elimination	Count eliminated
Antrim	Antrim South East	Mel Lucas	363	5.1	365.88	3rd
Ards	Ards East	Terry Williams	304	4.5	347	7th
Ards	Ards West	Jack Allister	343	5.2	414.07	5th
Ards	Newtownards	Hammy Lawther	183	3.4	186.96	2nd
Armagh	The Orchard	Paul Coleman	144	2.3	154.56	2nd
Ballymena	Ballymena North	James Alexander	389	6.5	638.95	9th
Ballymena	Ballymena North	David Lynn	218	3.6	237.81	3rd
Ballymena	Ballymena South	Jeremy Saulters	296	5.9	310.82	7th
Ballymena	Ballymena South	**Davy Tweed**	400	8.0	662.66	8th (elected)
Ballymena	Bannside	Timothy Gaston	465	6.9	470.50	3rd
Ballymena	Bannside	**Roy Gillespie**	1,031	15.3	1,126	5th (elected)
Ballymena	Braid	Sam Gaston	460	7.3	477.01	4th
Ballymoney	Ballymoney Town	Billy Kerr	228	7.4	249.29	5th
Ballymoney	Bann Valley	**William Blair**	440	9.0	607.84	8th (elected)
Ballymoney	Bushvale	Peter Deans	202	5.8	232.90	4th
Banbridge	Dromore	Lyle Rea	249	4.2	249	1st
Banbridge	Knockiveagh	Stephen Herron	209	3.2	234.90	2nd
Belfast	Pottinger	John Hiddleston	191	2.0	210.48	6th
Belfast	Victoria	Sammy Morrison	158	1.1	175.01	7th
Castlereagh	Castlereagh Central	Alan Carson	245	4.8	247.94	2nd
Coleraine	Bann	Elizabeth Collins	239	3.7	248.18	3rd
Coleraine	The Skerries	Michael Wiggins	85	2.1	85	1st
Cookstown	Ballinderry	Walter Millar	461	7.1	563.42	4th
Cookstown	Cookstown Central	Hannah Loughrin	254	6.1	439.83	5th
Cookstown	Drum Manor	Samuel Parke	444	8.8	542.28	3rd
Craigavon	Craigavon Central	Roy Ferguson	251	2.9	254.37	3rd
Craigavon	Lurgan	David Calvert	508	5.2	564.11	6th
Craigavon	Portadown	Karen Boal	217	3.1	252.85	5th
Dungannon	Blackwater	John Hobson	248	4.0	248	2nd
Dungannon	Dungannon Town	Denis Boyd	160	3.0	162.92	4th
Fermanagh	Erne North	Alex Elliott	309	4.8	331.68	3rd
Larne	Coast Road	Kenneth Johnston	105	3.2	121	3rd
Larne	Larne Lough	Sam McAllister	286	6.6	340.83	5th
Larne	Larne Town	**Jack McKee**	393	13.6	493	6th (elected)
Limavady	Benbradagh	**Boyd Douglas**	669	15.4	683.94	5th (elected)
Lisburn	Downshire	Kaye Kilpatrick	289	3.6	308.68	5th
Magherafelt	Magherafelt Town	Alan Dickson	577	8.4	704.97	6th
Magherafelt	Moyola	Alan Millar	494	8.0	500.62	4th
Moyle	Giant's Causeway	**Sharon McKillop**	164	10.2	236	5th (elected)
Newry and Mourne	The Fews	Barrie Halliday	178	2.3	204.85	5th
Newry and Mourne	The Mournes	Arthur Coulter	230	3.3	323.98	3rd

=== 2014 Northern Ireland local elections ===
Council	Electoral area	Candidate	First pref. votes	%	Votes at elimination	Count eliminated
Antrim and Newtownabbey	Antrim	Richard Cairns	560	9.4	594.84	4th
Antrim and Newtownabbey	Ballyclare	**David Arthurs**	750	13.4	900	5th (elected)
Antrim and Newtownabbey	Macedon	**David Hollis**	645	10.9	852.94	6th (elected)
Antrim and Newtownabbey	Three Mile Water	Trevor Mawhinney	524	7.9	740.70	9th
Armagh, Banbridge and Craigavon	Lagan River	Samuel Morrison	766	9.1	792	5th
Armagh, Banbridge and Craigavon	Lurgan	Roy Ferguson	370	3.2	537	6th
Armagh, Banbridge and Craigavon	Portadown	Paul Coleman	716	6.8	818.71	4th
Belfast	Botanic	Billy Dickson	509	5.7	593	8th
Belfast	Court	**Jolene Bunting**	839	7.3	1,135.16	12th (elected)
Belfast	Oldpark	Wayne Gilmour	317	3.0	320	4th
Belfast	Ormiston	John Hiddleston	640	4.9	658.14	6th
Belfast	Titanic	Harry Toan	578	5.8	793.78	9th
Causeway Coast and Glens	Ballymoney	**William Blair**	846	10.3	1,394.96	10th (elected)
Causeway Coast and Glens	Ballymoney	Jamise McIlhagga	632	7.7	666.28	9th
Causeway Coast and Glens	Bann	Elizabeth Collins	550	8.4	550	1st
Causeway Coast and Glens	Benbradagh	**Boyd Douglas**	1,160	19.6	1,160	1st (elected)
Causeway Coast and Glens	Causeway	**Sharon McKillop**	616	8.3	923.17	10th (elected)
Causeway Coast and Glens	Coleraine	Tommy Collins	327	5.0	378	4th
Causeway Coast and Glens	Limavady	Howard Gordon	325	5.9	440.71	9th
Causeway Coast and Glens	The Glens	Cyril Quigg	229	3.5	231	2nd
Fermanagh and Omagh	Enniskillen	Donald Crawford	636	9.4	802.54	8th
Fermanagh and Omagh	Erne North	Alex Elliott	455	7.2	572.80	4th
Lisburn and Castlereagh	Castlereagh East	**Andrew Girvin**	683	10.4	1,159	11th (elected)
Lisburn and Castlereagh	Castlereagh South	Wallace Douglas	520	6.4	544.89	5th
Lisburn and Castlereagh	Downshire East	Tom Mateer	413	6.9	517.24	7th
Lisburn and Castlereagh	Downshire West	Jonny Miller	335	5.8	461.98	9th
Lisburn and Castlereagh	Lisburn North	John McCall	300	4.5	353.56	5th
Lisburn and Castlereagh	Lisburn South	Andrew Moore	469	7.5	480	3rd
Mid and East Antrim	Ballymena	**Donna Anderson**	738	11.2	1,117.86	9th (elected)
Mid and East Antrim	Ballymena	Matthew Armstrong	377	5.7	413.05	8th
Mid and East Antrim	Bannside	**Timothy Gaston**	1,212	15.5	1,212	2nd (elected)
Mid and East Antrim	Bannside	**Stewart McDonald**	951	12.2	1,105.67	7th (elected)
Mid and East Antrim	Braid	**Brian Collins**	912	10.3	1,416.34	6th (elected)
Mid and East Antrim	Braid	Roy McPeake	597	6.8	649.34	5th
Mid and East Antrim	Carrick Castle	William Knox	338	5.8	399.45	5th
Mid and East Antrim	Coast Road	**Ruth Wilson**	575	10.7	873.72	10th (elected)
Mid and East Antrim	Knockagh	Ken McFaul	557	9.9	789.92	9th
Mid and East Antrim	Larne Lough	Kenneth Johnston	606	10.7	678.53	7th
Mid Ulster	Carntogher	Noel Stewart	498	6.6	498	1st
Mid Ulster	Cookstown	Walter Millar	636	7.0	813.90	9th
Mid Ulster	Dungannon	Kenny Loughrin	496	6.7	578.90	5th
Mid Ulster	Magherafelt	Gareth Ferguson	750	10.7	1,001	6th
Newry, Mourne and Down	Rowallane	Philip Hamilton	433	6.2	456.46	3rd
North Down and Ards	Bangor Central	William Cudworth	300	4.6	369	6th
North Down and Ards	Bangor East and Donaghadee	Joseph Strutt	362	5.3	411.40	7th
North Down and Ards	Bangor West	Robert Gordon	491	9.1	657	10th
North Down and Ards	Comber	**Stephen Cooper**	577	9.3	920.23	7th (elected)
North Down and Ards	Newtownards	David McMullen	522	6.4	689.53	9th

=== 2019 Northern Ireland local elections ===
Council	Electoral area	Candidate	First pref. votes	%	Votes at elimination	Count eliminated
Antrim and Newtownabbey	Antrim	Richard Cairns	347	5.4	379.58	3rd
Antrim and Newtownabbey	Macedon	David Hollis	223	3.6	297.56	5th
Antrim and Newtownabbey	Three Mile Water	Norman Boyd	234	3.3	258.7	6th
Ards and North Down	Comber	**Stephen Cooper**	695	10.7	1,065	6th (elected)
Armagh, Banbridge and Craigavon	Banbridge	William Martin	508	4.2	511.12	2nd
Armagh, Banbridge and Craigavon	Lagan River	Samuel Morrison	499	5.6	588.51	8th
Armagh, Banbridge and Craigavon	Portadown	Darrin Foster	547	4.9	713.25	8th
Belfast	Botanic	John Hiddleston	82	0.8	82	1st
Belfast	Court	Eric Smyth	259	2.3	287.98	5th
Causeway Coast and Glens	Ballymoney	William Blair	497	5.7	794.75	6th
Causeway Coast and Glens	Ballymoney	John Wilson	217	2.5	243.94	3rd
Causeway Coast and Glens	Bann	Elizabeth Collins	214	2.9	214	2nd
Causeway Coast and Glens	Benbradagh	Boyd Douglas	581	8.2	814.5	5th
Causeway Coast and Glens	Causeway	Stewart Moore	167	2.1	192.12	4th
Causeway Coast and Glens	Causeway	Cyril Quigg	325	4.0	494.52	7th
Causeway Coast and Glens	Limavady	Colin Cartwright	176	3.2	191.15	3rd
Fermanagh and Omagh	Enniskillen	Donald Crawford	492	6.8	638.63	5th
Fermanagh and Omagh	Erne North	Alex Elliott	465	6.8	477	3rd
Fermanagh and Omagh	Omagh	Charles Chittick	115	1.8	132.26	4th
Lisburn and Castlereagh	Castlereagh East	Andrew Girvin	637	9.1	656.39	4th
Lisburn and Castlereagh	Castlereagh South	Nicola Girvin	146	1.6	161.92	4th
Lisburn and Castlereagh	Lisburn South	Alison Chittick	384	5.5	477	3rd
Mid and East Antrim	Ballymena	**Matthew Armstrong**	765	11.0	1,016	3rd (elected)
Mid and East Antrim	Ballymena	Philip Gordon	286	4.1	302	2nd
Mid and East Antrim	Bannside	**Timothy Gaston**	1,433	17.8	1,433	1st (elected)
Mid and East Antrim	Bannside	**Stewart McDonald**	1,504	18.6	1,504	1st (elected)
Mid and East Antrim	Braid	**Brian Collins**	872	9.9	905.52	7th (elected)
Mid and East Antrim	Braid	**Christopher Jamieson**	902	10.2	983.36	7th (elected)
Mid and East Antrim	Coast Road	Ruth Wilson	601	10.7	681.95	5th
Mid and East Antrim	Knockagh	May Beattie	328	9.9	336.88	2nd
Mid and East Antrim	Larne Lough	James Strange	435	7.3	453.86	3rd
Mid Ulster	Cookstown	Alan Day	230	2.5	249.48	4th

=== 2023 Northern Ireland local elections ===
Council	Electoral area	Candidate	First pref. votes	%	Votes at elimination	Count eliminated
Antrim and Newtownabbey	Antrim	Richard Shields	453	6.4	467.48	5th
Antrim and Newtownabbey	Ballyclare	Mel Lucas	747	10.4	1,004.14	5th
Antrim and Newtownabbey	Dunsilly	Jonathan Campbell	445	6.0	446	2nd
Antrim and Newtownabbey	Macedon	Norman Boyd	333	4.7	435.76	6th
Antrim and Newtownabbey	Three Mile Water	Trevor Mawhinney	425	5.5	460.93	6th
Ards and North Down	Ards Peninsula	Tom Thompson	592	6.5	628.09	3rd
Ards and North Down	Bangor Central	Peter Wilson	454	5.4	729.52	9th
Ards and North Down	Bangor West	John Gordon	331	5.1	350.35	4th
Ards and North Down	Comber	Sam Patterson	409	5.6	922.12	5th
Ards and North Down	Holywood and Clandeboye	Diane Adams	364	4.7	364	1st
Ards and North Down	Newtownards	Eddie Allen	598	6.4	872.68	8th
Armagh, Banbridge and Craigavon	Banbridge	Brian Moorhead	593	4.3	596.78	2nd
Armagh, Banbridge and Craigavon	Cusher	**Keith Ratcliffe**	2,037	16.6	2,072.28	3rd (elected)
Armagh, Banbridge and Craigavon	Lagan River	Samuel Morrison	627	6.3	799.34	6th
Armagh, Banbridge and Craigavon	Portadown	Robert Oliver	795	6.5	814.63	5th
Belfast	Botanic	Billy Dickson	312	3.0	316.36	3rd
Belfast	Court	**Ron McDowell**	963	8.0	1,156.85	11th (elected)
Belfast	Lisnasharragh	Stephen Ferguson	368	3.1	375.14	2nd
Belfast	Oldpark	Ann McClure	595	4.8	624	5th
Belfast	Ormiston	John Hiddleston	680	4.8	870.93	5th
Belfast	Titanic	Anne Smyth	564	5.7	577.05	3rd
Causeway Coast and Glens	Ballymoney	**Jonathan McAuley**	995	10.0	1,139.2	7th (elected)
Causeway Coast and Glens	Bann	William Craig	456	5.8	463	3rd
Causeway Coast and Glens	Causeway	**Allister Kyle**	867	9.8	1,038.86	10th (elected)
Causeway Coast and Glens	Coleraine	Michael Sweeney	339	4.6	358.44	3rd
Fermanagh and Omagh	Enniskillen	Donald Crawford	509	6.6	683.18	7th
Fermanagh and Omagh	Erne North	Alex Elliott	422	5.9	461.42	5th
Lisburn and Castlereagh	Castlereagh East	Andrew Girvin	534	6.8	589.76	4th
Lisburn and Castlereagh	Downshire East	Stewart Ferris	396	5.7	570.48	5th
Lisburn and Castlereagh	Lisburn South	Stewart McEvoy	387	5.2	388.44	2nd
Mid and East Antrim	Ballymena	**Matthew Armstrong**	991	13.6	991	1st (elected)
Mid and East Antrim	Bannside	**Timothy Gaston**	1,468	16.7	1,468	1st (elected)
Mid and East Antrim	Bannside	Anna Henry	562	6.4	862.75	5th
Mid and East Antrim	Bannside	**Stewart McDonald**	1,442	16.4	1,442	1st (elected)
Mid and East Antrim	Braid	**Christopher Jamieson**	1,195	12.6	1,195	1st (elected)
Mid and East Antrim	Braid	**Matthew Warwick**	840	8.9	1,162.63	8th (elected)
Mid and East Antrim	Carrick Castle	Frances Henderson	437	7.0	629.07	7th
Mid and East Antrim	Coast Road	Wesley Stevenson	340	5.8	383.74	6th
Mid and East Antrim	Knockagh	James Strange	348	6.7	358.53	2nd
Mid and East Antrim	Larne Lough	Ronnie Donnell	427	6.7	444.69	5th
Mid Ulster	Carntogher	James Artt	530	6.0	533	4th
Mid Ulster	Cookstown	Timothy Hagan	663	6.4	740.19	9th
Mid Ulster	Dungannon	Kinley Tener	299	3.1	398.9	5th
Mid Ulster	Magherafelt	Raymond Love	671	8.1	767.8	5th
Mid Ulster	Moyola	Glenn Moore	519	5.7	536.29	6th
Newry, Mourne and Down	The Mournes	Harold McKee	880	6.6	1,163.12	8th

== Local by-elections ==
=== 2008 Dromore by-election ===
Dromore by-election 13 February 2008
Party	Candidate	FPv%	Count				
Party	Candidate	FPv%	1	2	3	4	5
UUP	**Carol Black**	24.2	912	937	1,119	1,194	**1,571**
DUP	Paul Stewart	28.3	1,069	1,074	1,127	1,178	1,505
TUV	Keith Harbinson	19.6	739	742	801	828	
Sinn Féin	Paul Gribben	9.3	350	507	567		
Alliance	David Griffin	9.5	357	479			
SDLP	Paul Gribben	7.7	290				
Green (NI)	Helen Corry	1.6	59				
Valid: 3,776 Spoilt: 17 Quota: 1,889 Turnout: 3,793
