= 2011 Ballymena Borough Council election =

Local government election in Northern Ireland

← 2005	5 May 2011	2014 →

All 24 seats to Ballymena Borough Council 13 seats needed for a majority
	First party	Second party	Third party
Party	DUP	UUP	TUV
Seats won	12	4	2
Seat change	▼2	▼1	▲2
	Fourth party	Fifth party	Sixth party
Party	SDLP	Sinn Féin	Alliance
Seats won	2	2	1
Seat change	▼1	▲1	▲1
	Seventh party
Party	Independent
Seats won	1
Seat change	Steady
- Party with the most votes by district.

Elections to Ballymena Borough Council were held on 5 May 2011 on the same day as the other Northern Irish local government elections. The election used four district electoral areas to elect a total of 24 councillors.

== Election results ==
Ballymena Borough Council Election Result 2011
Party	Seats	Gains	Losses	Net gain/loss	Seats %	Votes %	Votes	+/−
DUP	12	0	2	▼2	50.0	45.7	10,999	▼9.5
UUP	4	0	1	▼1	16.7	16.4	3,943	▼5.2
TUV	2	2	0	▲2	8.3	13.6	3,259	New
SDLP	2	0	1	▼1	8.3	8.6	2,060	▼1.8
Sinn Féin	2	1	0	▲1	8.3	8.3	2,003	▲0.7
Independent	1	0	0	Steady	4.2	5.7	1,365	▲2.3
Alliance	1	1	0	▲1	4.2	1.7	416	▲0.2

Note: "Votes" are the first preference votes.

== Districts summary ==
Results of the Ballymena Borough Council election, 2011 by district
Ward	%	Cllrs	%	Cllrs	%	Cllrs	%	Cllrs	%	Cllrs	%	Cllrs	%	Cllrs	Total Cllrs
Ward	DUP		UUP		TUV		SDLP		Sinn Féin		Alliance		Others		Total Cllrs
Ballymena North	35.7	3	14.2	1	10.1	0	9.9	1	5.9	0	6.9	1	17.3	1	7
Ballymena South	51.2	4	14.9	1	14.0	1	12.4	1	5.7	0	0.0	0	1.8	0	7
Bannside	44.4	2	15.3	1	22.1	1	6.5	0	11.7	1	0.0	0	0.0	0	5
Braid	52.5	3	20.8	1	7.3	0	6.5	0	9.1	1	0.0	0	3.8	0	5
Total	45.7	12	16.4	4	13.6	2	8.6	2	8.3	2	1.7	1	5.7	1	24

== Districts results ==
=== Ballymena North ===
2005: 3 x DUP, 2 x UUP, 1 x SDLP, 1 x Independent
2011: 3 x DUP, 1 x UUP, 1 x SDLP, 1 x Alliance, 1 x Independent
2005-2011 Change: Alliance gain from UUP

Ballymena North - 7 seats
Party	Candidate	FPv%	Count								
Party	Candidate	FPv%	1	2	3	4	5	6	7	8	9
Independent	James Henry*	17.13%	1,026								
DUP	John Carson*	15.71%	941								
DUP	Maurice Mills*	12.45%	746	787.44							
SDLP	Patrick McAvoy*	9.95%	596	617.84	619.31	622.15	910.15				
UUP	James McClean	7.28%	436	477.72	485.7	503.9	505.18	509.18	512.96	826.96	
DUP	Audrey Wales	7.53%	451	479.56	643.36	664.77	666.05	674.05	700.51	745.78	780.1
Alliance	Jayne Dunlop	6.94%	416	463.88	466.61	474.45	492.01	624.01	625.63	674.96	699.05
TUV	James Alexander*	6.49%	389	412.52	417.98	575.88	575.88	575.88	577.23	620.8	638.95
UUP	Neil Armstrong*	6.94%	416	463.32	468.57	481.25	481.25	482.25	486.3		
Sinn Féin	Sean Davey	5.94%	356	357.96	357.96	357.96					
TUV	David Lynn	3.64%	218	232.56	237.81						
Electorate: 12,118 Valid: 5,991 (49.44%) Spoilt: 118 Quota: 749 Turnout: 6,109 (50.41%)

=== Ballymena South ===
2005: 5 x DUP, 1 x UUP, 1 x SDLP
2011: 4 x DUP, 1 x UUP, 1 x TUV, 1 x SDLP
2005-2011 Change: TUV gain from DUP

Ballymena South - 7 seats
Party	Candidate	FPv%	Count							
Party	Candidate	FPv%	1	2	3	4	5	6	7	8
DUP	Beth Adger*	14.98%	746							
SDLP	Declan O'Loan*	12.37%	616	627						
DUP	Hubert Nicholl*	10.92%	544	559	575.64	707.64				
DUP	Martin Clarke*	10.26%	511	522	583.92	627.92				
DUP	Desmond Robinson	9.92%	494	499	506.04	570.92	648.64			
TUV	David Tweed*	8.03%	400	408	409.44	412.08	413.42	416.66	417.66	662.66
UUP	James Currie*	8.41%	419	426	430	443.8	448.49	463.61	506.61	518.77
UUP	Robin Swann	6.47%	322	330	332.4	338.04	338.04	344.52	356.52	391.68
TUV	Jeremy Saulters	5.94%	296	298	299.28	304.28	304.28	304.82	310.82	
Sinn Féin	Thomas O'Hara	5.74%	286	289	289	289	289	289		
DUP	Gayle Nelson	5.08%	253	260	282.56					
Independent	Deirdre Nelson*	1.87%	93							
Electorate: 10,675 Valid: 4,980 (46.65%) Spoilt: 139 Quota: 623 Turnout: 5,119 (47.95%)

=== Bannside ===
2005: 3 x DUP, 1 x UUP, 1 x Sinn Féin
2011: 2 x DUP, 1 x TUV, 1 x UUP, 1 x Sinn Féin
2005-2011 Change: TUV gain from DUP

Bannside - 5 seats
Party	Candidate	FPv%	Count				
Party	Candidate	FPv%	1	2	3	4	5
DUP	Tommy Nicholl*	17.65%	1,192				
TUV	Roy Gillespie*	15.27%	1,031	1,034.05	1,040.05	1,428.05	
UUP	William McNeilly*	15.34%	1,036	1,038.65	1,084.7	1,109.85	1,225.85
DUP	Billy Henry	15.04%	1,016	1,046.8	1,056.85	1,075.45	1,155.45
Sinn Féin	Monica Digney*	11.65%	787	787.05	1,036.1	1,039.1	1,040.1
DUP	Philip Moffett	11.67%	788	808.3	814.45	832.9	891.9
TUV	Timothy Gaston	6.88%	465	466.45	470.5		
SDLP	Eugene Reid	6.50%	439	439.35			
Electorate: 11,284 Valid: 6,754 (59.85%) Spoilt: 118 Quota: 1,126 Turnout: 6,872 (60.90%)

=== Braid ===
2005: 3 x DUP, 1 x UUP, 1 x SDLP
2011: 3 x DUP, 1 x UUP, 1 x Sinn Féin
2005-2011 Change: Sinn Féin gain from SDLP

Braid - 5 seats
Party	Candidate	FPv%	Count						
Party	Candidate	FPv%	1	2	3	4	5	6	7
DUP	Paul Frew*	23.91%	1,511						
DUP	Beth Clyde	14.59%	922	1,240.3					
DUP	Samuel Hanna*	13.99%	884	958.7	1,118.84				
Sinn Féin	Paul Maguire	9.08%	574	574.3	574.3	632.6	633.6	962.5	963.14
UUP	Robin Cherry*	10.95%	692	706.1	711.88	712.88	859.66	883.66	910.06
UUP	Lexie Scott	9.84%	622	646	653.99	658.99	805.93	847.4	884.84
SDLP	Cahal Kerr	6.47%	409	411.7	412.21	558.51	561.51		
TUV	Samuel Gaston*	7.28%	460	467.8	470.01	477.01			
Independent	Catherine O'Hara	3.89%	246	246.9	247.07				
Electorate: 10,688 Valid: 6,320 (59.13%) Spoilt: 90 Quota: 1,054 Turnout: 6,410 (59.97%)
