= 1997 Ballymena Borough Council election =

Local government election in Northern Ireland

← 1993	21 May 1997	2001 →

All 24 seats to Ballymena Borough Council 13 seats needed for a majority
	First party	Second party	Third party
Party	UUP	DUP	SDLP
Seats won	11	8	3
Seat change	▲1	▼1	▲1
	Fourth party	Fifth party
Party	Alliance	Ind. Unionist
Seats won	1	1
Seat change	0	▼1
- Results by district electoral area, shaded by First Preference Votes.

Elections to Ballymena Borough Council were held on 21 May 1997 on the same day as the other Northern Irish local government elections. The election used four district electoral areas to elect a total of 24 councillors.

== Election results ==
Ballymena Borough Council Election Result 1997
Party	Seats	Gains	Losses	Net gain/loss	Seats %	Votes %	Votes	+/−
UUP	11	1	0	▲1	45.8	38.3	8,639	▼0.4
DUP	8	0	1	▼1	33.3	36.7	8,639	▲5.0
SDLP	3	1	0	▲1	12.5	17.5	3,951	▲5.6
Ind. Unionist	1	0	1	▼1	4.2	5.5	1,233	▲0.2
Alliance	1	0	0	0	4.2	2.0	447	▼3.4

Note: "Votes" are the first preference votes.

== Districts summary ==
Results of the Ballymena Borough Council election, 1997 by district
Ward	%	Cllrs	%	Cllrs	%	Cllrs	%	Cllrs	%	Cllrs	Total Cllrs
Ward	UUP		DUP		SDLP		Alliance		Others		Total Cllrs
Ballymena North	36.8	3	22.0	1	16.8	1	7.8	1	16.6	1	7
Ballymena South	36.6	3	40.9	3	17.6	1	0.0	0	4.9	0	7
Bannside	32.9	2	50.7	3	16.4	0	0.0	0	0.0	0	5
Braid	47.7	3	32.7	1	19.6	1	0.0	0	0.0	0	5
Total	38.3	11	36.7	8	17.5	3	2.0	1	5.5	1	24

== Districts results ==
=== Ballymena North ===
1993: 3 x UUP, 1 x DUP, 1 x SDLP, 1 x Alliance, 1 x Independent Unionist
1997: 3 x UUP, 1 x DUP, 1 x SDLP, 1 x Alliance, 1 x Independent Unionist
1993-1997 Change: No change

Ballymena North - 7 seats
Party	Candidate	FPv%	Count					
Party	Candidate	FPv%	1	2	3	4	5	6
SDLP	Patrick McAvoy*	16.84%	975					
UUP	William Wright*	16.46%	953					
Ind. Unionist	Samuel Henry*	12.58%	728					
UUP	Joseph McKernan*	10.88%	630	669.9	785.34			
UUP	James Alexander*	9.45%	547	551.8	620.92	675.52	778.52	
DUP	Maurice Mills*	10.54%	610	610.3	624.46	626.15	650.28	768.28
Alliance	Jayne Dunlop	7.72%	447	641.4	645	645.91	700.61	703.09
DUP	John Stewart	7.20%	417	417.3	428.1	429.4	439.14	562.22
DUP	David Warwick	4.27%	247	247.3	253.78	253.91	269.15	
Ind. Unionist	Herbert Park	4.06%	235	242.2	246.28	247.58		
Electorate: 12,239 Valid: 5,789 (47.30%) Spoilt: 81 Quota: 724 Turnout: 5,870 (47.96%)

=== Ballymena South ===
1993: 3 x DUP, 2 x UUP, 1 x SDLP, 1 x Independent Unionist
1997: 3 x DUP, 3 x UUP, 1 x SDLP
1993-1997 Change: UUP gain from Independent Unionist

Ballymena South - 7 seats
Party	Candidate	FPv%	Count								
Party	Candidate	FPv%	1	2	3	4	5	6	7	8	9
SDLP	Declan O'Loan*	17.56%	967								
UUP	James Currie*	16.67%	918								
DUP	David Tweed	15.11%	832								
DUP	Martin Clarke*	10.37%	571	576.6	581.02	604.99	614.81	655.29	896.29		
DUP	Hubert Nicholl	9.70%	534	535.68	544	575.45	585	622.43	714.87		
UUP	Peter Brown	6.85%	377	425.72	478.24	481.64	524.27	548.93	559.69	583.69	586.41
UUP	Malcolm Gilmour	6.63%	365	390.76	472.66	479.63	495.69	538.51	556.29	577.29	580.86
UUP	John Scott*	6.48%	357	410.2	473.9	479.51	499.95	534.81	546.52	565.52	567.56
DUP	John Carson	5.72%	315	316.68	320.84	369.63	379.16	397.12			
Ind. Unionist	Agnes McLeister	3.34%	184	196.32	203.6	219.75	240.93				
Ind. Unionist	Samuel Balmer	1.56%	86	210.32	214.74	216.1					
Electorate: 12,043 Valid: 5,506 (45.72%) Spoilt: 116 Quota: 689 Turnout: 5,622 (46.68%)

=== Bannside ===
1993: 3 x DUP, 2 x UUP
1997: 3 x DUP, 2 x UUP
1993-1997 Change: No change

Bannside - 5 seats
Party	Candidate	FPv%	Count				
Party	Candidate	FPv%	1	2	3	4	5
DUP	Roy Gillespie*	18.75%	1,110				
DUP	Tommy Nicholl*	17.70%	1,048				
UUP	Robert Coulter*	17.13%	1,014				
DUP	Sandy Spence*	14.27%	845	949.28	1,004.6		
UUP	Ian Johnston*	15.81%	936	948.43	953.71	972.89	987.89
SDLP	Seamus Laverty	16.33%	967	967.33	967.39	967.55	967.67
Electorate: 9,931 Valid: 5,920 (59.61%) Spoilt: 115 Quota: 987 Turnout: 6,035 (60.77%)

=== Braid ===
1993: 3 x UUP, 2 x DUP
1997: 3 x UUP, 1 x DUP, 1 x SDLP
1993-1997 Change: SDLP gain from DUP

Braid - 5 seats
Party	Candidate	FPv%	Count				
Party	Candidate	FPv%	1	2	3	4	5
SDLP	Margaret Gribben	19.57%	1,042				
UUP	David Clyde*	18.05%	961				
UUP	Desmond Armstrong*	15.33%	816	919.48			
DUP	Samuel Hanna*	11.70%	623	632.36	1,029.36		
UUP	Lexie Scott	14.37%	765	794.12	812.2	814.72	878.48
DUP	Samuel Gaston	11.78%	627	629.08	690.72	826.8	833.92
DUP	David McClintock*	9.20%	490	497.8			
Electorate: 9,081 Valid: 5,324 (58.63%) Spoilt: 91 Quota: 888 Turnout: 5,415 (59.63%)
