= Timothy Gaston =

Traditional Unionist Voice politician

Timothy Gaston MLA

Member of the Legislative Assembly for North Antrim
- Incumbent
- Assumed office 16 July 2024
- Preceded by: Jim Allister

Deputy mayor of Mid and East Antrim
- In office April 2015 – 2016
- Preceded by: Office created
- Succeeded by: William McNeilly

Member of Mid and East Antrim Borough Council
- In office 22 May 2014 – 16 July 2024
- Preceded by: Council established
- Succeeded by: Anna Henry
- Constituency: Bannside

Member of Ballymena Borough Council
- In office 14 February 2013 – 22 May 2014
- Preceded by: Davy Tweed
- Succeeded by: Council abolished
- Constituency: Ballymena South

Personal details
- Born: October 1988 (age 38) Glarryford, Ballymena, Northern Ireland
- Party: Traditional Unionist Voice

Timothy James Gaston (born October 1988) is a Traditional Unionist Voice (TUV) politician, serving as a Member of the Legislative Assembly (MLA) for North Antrim since July 2024.

Prior to this, Gaston had been a Mid and East Antrim Borough Councillor for the Bannside DEA from 2014 to 2024.

== Early life ==
Timothy Gaston was born in October 1988 in the Glarryford area of Ballymena, County Antrim.

== Career ==
Before entering politics, Gaston worked as a self-employed firewood supplier in the Glarryford area of Ballymena, operating a small business known as The Stickman.

== Political career ==
Gaston's first electoral contest was at the 2011 local elections, where he was the running mate to Ballymena Councillor, Roy Gillespie, in the Bannside District.

He was later co-opted onto the council in February 2013, for the Ballymena South District, following the resignation of Davy Tweed.

Gaston was elected onto the new Mid and East Antrim Borough Council at the 2014 local elections, topping the poll in Bannside.

In April 2015, he was appointed as the first deputy mayor of Mid and East Antrim.

He was the TUV candidate in North Antrim at the 2015 general election, finishing second with 6,561 votes (15.7%), against Ian Paisley Jr of the Democratic Unionist Party (DUP).

At the 2016 Northern Ireland Assembly election, he was the running mate in North Antrim to sitting Assembly member and party leader, Jim Allister. Gaston was eliminated on the sixth count, having polled 4.77% of first-preferences.

Gaston stood again at the 2017 Assembly election, but was not successful.

At the 2017 general election, Gaston stood again in North Antrim, where he came fourth with 3,282 votes (6.8%).

=== Member of the Northern Ireland Assembly ===
In July 2024, Gaston was co-opted to the Northern Ireland Assembly to succeed Allister, following the latter’s election as MP for North Antrim.

In September 2024, while sitting as a member of the Northern Ireland Executive Committee, Gaston clashed with Paula Bradshaw, chair of the committee. He had asked Geraldine McGahey, Chief Commissioner of the Northern Ireland Equality Commission, if the body saw “the conflict between the rights of a woman, and a biological man claiming or thinking that he is a woman." Bradshaw responded to Gaston's questioning, telling the latter to “watch your language.”

Gaston has called the Bible, "the bedrock of moral order" and has criticised a neutral or multi-faith approach to religious education in schools.

In February 2026, Gaston was suspended from the Northern Ireland Assembly for two days after telling the chairwoman of a Stormont committee to "breathe". He made the remark during an exchange with Alliance Party MLA Paula Bradshaw, who chairs the executive office scrutiny committee. MLA's voted to suspend Mr Gaston with 46 members voting in favour, 31 against, and one abstention. TUV leader Jim Allister called it a "witch hunt" and said the sanctions were "wholly disproportionate and inappropriate." Pens printed with the words "Vote TUV" and “take a step back, you’re OK. Breathe” were sold at TUV party conference.

== Personal life ==
Gaston lives in Ballymena with his wife, Rebekah, and their three sons.
