= 2001 Ballymena Borough Council election =

Local government election in Northern Ireland

← 1997	7 June 2001	2005 →

All 24 seats to Ballymena Borough Council 13 seats needed for a majority
	First party	Second party	Third party
Party	DUP	UUP	SDLP
Seats won	11	7	4
Seat change	▲3	▼4	▲1
	Fourth party	Fifth party
Party	Independent	Alliance
Seats won	2	0
Seat change	▲1	▼1
- Party with the most votes by district.

Elections to Ballymena Borough Council were held on 7 June 2001 on the same day as the other Northern Irish local government elections. The election used four district electoral areas to elect a total of 24 councillors.

== Election results ==
Ballymena Borough Council Election Result 2001
Party	Seats	Gains	Losses	Net gain/loss	Seats %	Votes %	Votes	+/−
DUP	11	3	0	▲3	45.8	44.9	12,944	▲8.2
UUP	7	0	4	▼4	29.2	27.5	7,927	▼10.8
SDLP	4	1	0	▲1	16.7	16.5	4,754	▼1.0
Independent	2	2	0	▲2	8.3	7.3	2,117	▲6.9
Sinn Féin	0	0	0	0	0.0	1.3	382	▲1.3
Alliance	0	0	1	▼1	0.0	1.1	317	▼0.9
PUP	0	0	0	0	0.0	0.8	206	▲0.8
NI Unionist	0	0	0	0	0.0	0.6	186	New

Note: "Votes" are the first preference votes.

== Districts summary ==
Results of the Ballymena Borough Council election, 2001 by district
Ward	%	Cllrs	%	Cllrs	%	Cllrs	%	Cllrs	Total Cllrs
Ward	DUP		UUP		SDLP		Others		Total Cllrs
Ballymena North	27.7	2	24.8	2	13.8	1	33.7	2	7
Ballymena South	55.8	4	22.1	2	17.3	1	4.8	0	7
Bannside	55.2	3	24.0	1	17.6	1	3.2	0	5
Braid	41.8	2	40.3	2	17.5	1	0.4	0	5
Total	44.9	11	27.5	7	16.5	4	11.1	2	24

== Districts results ==
=== Ballymena North ===
1997: 3 x UUP, 2 x DUP, 1 x SDLP, 1 x Alliance, 1 x Independent Unionist
2001: 2 x DUP, 2 x UUP, 2 x Independent, 1 x SDLP
1997-2001 Change: DUP gain from Alliance, Independent leaves UUP and Independent Unionist becomes Independent

Ballymena North - 7 seats
Party	Candidate	FPv%	Count										
Party	Candidate	FPv%	1	2	3	4	5	6	7	8	9	10	11
DUP	James Alexander*	14.34%	1,110										
SDLP	Patrick McAvoy*	13.83%	1,071										
Independent	James Henry	13.69%	1,060										
UUP	Joseph McKernan*	7.92%	613	614.32	616.32	625.12	642.58	806.06	855.29	942.07	992.25		
DUP	Maurice Mills*	8.07%	625	663.28	673.4	674.1	680.76	684.04	705.49	711.56	713.86	1,092.86	
Independent	William Wright*	7.14%	553	557.32	561.32	561.72	578.28	584.37	651.57	691.17	709.97	753.83	835.94
UUP	Neil Armstrong	6.88%	533	538.28	540.4	541.5	551.58	585.49	613.77	682.18	701.58	732.55	760.09
UUP	Gillian Scott	6.87%	532	534.04	538.04	539.94	546.6	569.19	598.75	698.32	706.41	719.98	734.26
DUP	Simon Hamilton	5.31%	411	489.24	494.6	494.8	499.21	504.63	516.99	525.11	526.41		
Sinn Féin	Gerard Magee	4.93%	382	382	382	429	429.72	429.72	433.22	454.9			
Alliance	Jayne Dunlop*	4.09%	317	318.08	319.08	348.28	357.28	358.47	427.39				
Independent	Audrey Wales	3.40%	263	263.6	265.6	275	288.68	302.13					
UUP	William McElfatrick	3.13%	242	242.72	242.72	244.12	250.87						
PUP	William Parkhill	0.39%	30	30.6									
Electorate: 12,285 Valid: 7,742 (63.02%) Spoilt: 134 Quota: 968 Turnout: 7,876 (64.11%)

=== Ballymena South ===
1997 3 x DUP, 3 x UUP, 1 x SDLP
2001 4 x DUP, 2 x UUP, 1 x SDLP
1997-2001 Change: DUP gain from UUP

Ballymena South - 7 seats
Party	Candidate	FPv%	Count							
Party	Candidate	FPv%	1	2	3	4	5	6	7	8
SDLP	Declan O'Loan*	17.29%	1,212							
UUP	James Currie*	15.58%	1,092							
DUP	Beth Adger	15.14%	1,061							
DUP	David Tweed*	14.52%	1,018							
DUP	Martin Clarke*	11.31%	793	798.72	805.92	875.45	960.85			
DUP	Hubert Nicholl*	10.77%	755	759.84	770.44	859.35	894.91			
UUP	Peter Brown*	6.55%	459	543.48	624.48	635.19	640.65	649.61	668.38	757.76
UUP	William Moore	4.07%	285	376.52	476.52	479.41	480.53	484.17	511.16	601.89
Independent	David Warwick	3.44%	241	364.2	372	375.23	380.97	387.27	409.61	
PUP	William McCaughey	0.73%	51	59.36	60.56	61.58	62.98	65.08		
PUP	Jean Rainey	0.61%	43	59.28	61.28	61.79	62.91	64.31		
Electorate: 11,772 Valid: 7,010 (59.55%) Spoilt: 136 Quota: 877 Turnout: 7,146 (60.70%)

=== Bannside ===
1997: 3 x DUP, 2 x UUP
2001: 3 x DUP, 1 x UUP, 1 x SDLP
1997-2001 Change: SDLP gain from UUP

Bannside - 5 seats
Party	Candidate	FPv%	Count					
Party	Candidate	FPv%	1	2	3	4	5	6
DUP	Roy Gillespie*	19.13%	1,427					
SDLP	Seamus Laverty	12.57%	938	938.65	941.65	1,276.65		
UUP	William McNeilly	14.21%	1,060	1,068.58	1,111.97	1,112.97	1,806.97	
DUP	Tommy Nicholl*	12.90%	962	993.72	1,052.93	1,055.06	1,075.97	1,247.97
DUP	Samuel Gaston	11.93%	890	934.46	976.24	976.24	989.45	1,121.45
DUP	William Wilkinson	11.29%	842	926.76	971.19	972.19	981.1	1,057.1
UUP	Samuel McLean	9.75%	727	733.11	763.5	765.63		
SDLP	Joseph Montgomery	5.03%	375	375.39	375.39			
NI Unionist	Norman Sloan	2.49%	186	190.16				
PUP	Kenneth McCaughey	0.71%	53	54.3				
Electorate: 10,493 Valid: 7,460 (71.10%) Spoilt: 152 Quota: 1,244 Turnout: 7,612 (72.54%)

=== Braid ===
1997: 3 x UUP, 1 x DUP, 1 x SDLP
2001: 2 x DUP, 2 x UUP, 1 x SDLP
1997-2001 Change: DUP gain from UUP

Braid - 5 seats
Party	Candidate	FPv%	Count					
Party	Candidate	FPv%	1	2	3	4	5	6
DUP	Samuel Hanna	18.75%	1,242					
SDLP	Margaret Gribben*	17.48%	1,158					
DUP	Robin Stirling*	12.36%	819	831.54	833.54	834.35	1,461.35	
UUP	David Clyde*	14.51%	961	964.52	972.52	998.71	1,035.71	1,120.71
UUP	Lexie Scott*	13.48%	893	899.93	903.15	912.42	964.99	1,018.99
UUP	Desmond Armstrong*	12.30%	815	815	817	829.42	856.82	905.82
DUP	Robert Osborne	10.67%	707	817.22	826.33	827.23		
PUP	Robert Hamilton	0.44%	29	29.33				
Electorate: 9,397 Valid: 6,624 (70.49%) Spoilt: 88 Quota: 1,105 Turnout: 6,712 (71.43%)
