= 1993 Ballymena Borough Council election =

Local government election in Northern Ireland

← 1989	19 May 1993	1997 →

All 24 seats to Ballymena Borough Council 13 seats needed for a majority
	First party	Second party	Third party
Party	UUP	DUP	SDLP
Seats won	10	9	2
Seat change	▲3	▼3	▲1
	Fourth party	Fifth party	Sixth party
Party	Ind. Unionist	Alliance	Independent
Seats won	2	1	0
Seat change	▲1	0	▼1
- Party with the most votes by district.

Elections to Ballymena Borough Council were held on 19 May 1993 on the same day as the other Northern Irish local government elections. The election used four district electoral areas to elect a total of 24 councillors.

== Election results ==
Ballymena Borough Council Election Result 1993
Party	Seats	Gains	Losses	Net gain/loss	Seats %	Votes %	Votes	+/−
UUP	10	3	0	▲3	41.7	38.7	8,691	▲7.9
DUP	9	0	3	▼3	37.5	31.7	7,116	▼13.1
SDLP	2	1	0	▲1	8.3	11.9	2,683	▲2.7
Ind. Unionist	2	1	0	▲1	8.3	11.5	2,580	▲6.6
Alliance	1	0	0	0	4.2	5.4	1,221	▼0.7
Ulster Democratic	0	0	0	0	0.0	0.4	95	New
Independent	0	0	1	▼1	0.0	0.3	66	▲3.9

Note: "Votes" are the first preference votes.

== Districts summary ==
Results of the Ballymena Borough Council election, 1993 by district
Ward	%	Cllrs	%	Cllrs	%	Cllrs	%	Cllrs	%	Cllrs	Total Cllrs
Ward	UUP		DUP		SDLP		Alliance		Others		Total Cllrs
Ballymena North	32.2	3	17.4	1	13.8	1	19.6	1	17.0	1	7
Ballymena South	24.7	2	28.2	3	17.8	1	0.0	0	29.3	1	7
Bannside	37.5	2	48.5	3	14.0	0	0.0	0	0.0	0	5
Braid	65.6	3	34.4	1	0.0	0	0.0	0	0.0	0	5
Total	38.7	10	31.7	9	11.9	2	5.4	1	12.3	2	24

== Districts results ==
=== Ballymena North ===
1993: 3 x UUP, 1 x Alliance, 1 x DUP, 1 x SDLP, 1 x Independent Unionist

Ballymena North - 7 seats
Party	Candidate	FPv%	Count							
Party	Candidate	FPv%	1	2	3	4	5	6	7	8
Ind. Unionist	Samuel Henry*	15.50%	964							
SDLP	Patrick McAvoy*	13.83%	860							
UUP	William Wright	13.19%	820							
Alliance	Gareth Williams*	11.69%	727	765.6	800.8					
UUP	James Alexander*	10.95%	681	727.4	728.4	751.45	771.05	791.05		
DUP	Maurice Mills*	7.24%	450	461.8	462	463.35	468.05	671.55	951.55	
UUP	Joseph McKernan*	7.93%	493	539.6	545.2	555.7	568.5	574.55	615.05	684.05
Alliance	Ethel Kenny	7.94%	494	521	553.2	555	569.9	573.9	582.85	593.85
DUP	John Wilson*	5.53%	344	350.2	350.2	351.75	359.15	423.25		
DUP	John Carson	4.66%	290	293.2	293.2	293.5	306.5			
Ulster Democratic	Samuel Balmer	1.53%	95	100.2	101.1	102.15				
Electorate: 12,034 Valid: 6,218 (51.67%) Spoilt: 72 Quota: 778 Turnout: 6,290 (52.27%)

=== Ballymena South ===
1993: 3 x DUP, 2 x UUP, 1 x SDLP, 1 x Independent Unionist

Ballymena South - 7 seats
Party	Candidate	FPv%	Count							
Party	Candidate	FPv%	1	2	3	4	5	6	7	8
Ind. Unionist	William Brownlees*	22.64%	1,301							
SDLP	Declan O'Loan	17.77%	1,021							
UUP	John Scott	14.41%	828							
UUP	James Currie*	10.30%	592	946						
DUP	Martin Clarke*	9.99%	574	649.5	654.06	684.06	703.56	720.56		
DUP	James McCosh*	9.55%	549	580	581.71	602.21	611.96	615.92	677.74	686.08
DUP	Frederick Coulter	4.63%	266	304.5	306.21	322.71	337.96	342.46	493.03	522.35
Ind. Unionist	Agnes McLeister	3.90%	224	263.5	278.89	346.39	381.39	403.74	415.99	499.09
Independent	Charles Magill	1.56%	66	80.5	236.11	257.11	265.11	405.78	409.35	
DUP	John McKendry	4.07%	234	247	250.42	255.92	264.17	271.49		
Ind. Unionist	Melvyn McKendry	1.58%	91	107	224.42	242.42	252.92			
Electorate: 12,121 Valid: 5,746 (47.41%) Spoilt: 141 Quota: 719 Turnout: 5,887 (48.57%)

=== Bannside ===
1993: 3 x DUP, 2 x UUP

Bannside - 5 seats
Party	Candidate	FPv%	Count			
Party	Candidate	FPv%	1	2	3	4
UUP	Robert Coulter*	21.69%	1,239			
UUP	Ian Johnston*	15.82%	904	1,136.3		
DUP	Roy Gillespie*	11.61%	663	677.49	691.75	999.75
DUP	Tommy Nicholl*	13.85%	791	799.28	823.89	985.89
DUP	Sandy Spence*	11.59%	662	678.56	749.4	905.35
SDLP	Seamus Laverty	14.04%	802	802.46	812.12	814.35
DUP	Hubert Nicholl*	11.41%	652	658.67	677.3	
Electorate: 9,229 Valid: 5,713 (61.90%) Spoilt: 102 Quota: 953 Turnout: 5,815 (63.01%)

=== Braid ===
1993: 3 x UUP, 2 x DUP

Braid - 5 seats
Party	Candidate	FPv%	Count					
Party	Candidate	FPv%	1	2	3	4	5	6
UUP	David Clyde*	27.31%	1,304					
UUP	Desmond Armstrong*	21.76%	1,039					
UUP	Robert Forsythe	16.57%	791	1,196.45				
DUP	Samuel Hanna*	13.68%	653	678.2	718.25	838.33		
DUP	David McClintock*	9.15%	437	460.85	482	508.86	582.21	618.61
DUP	Samuel Wallace	8.06%	385	420.55	439	501.41	609.27	614.47
DUP	Samuel Martin	3.48%	166	182.2	196.15	229.33		
Electorate: 8,781 Valid: 4,775 (54.38%) Spoilt: 143 Quota: 796 Turnout: 4,918 (56.01%)
