= 2005 Ballymena Borough Council election =

Local government election in Northern Ireland

← 2001	5 May 2005	2011 →

All 24 seats to Ballymena Borough Council 13 seats needed for a majority
	First party	Second party	Third party
Party	DUP	UUP	SDLP
Seats won	14	5	3
Seat change	▲3	▼2	▼1
	Fourth party	Fifth party
Party	Sinn Féin	Independent
Seats won	1	1
Seat change	▲1	▼1
- Party with the most votes by district.

Elections to Ballymena Borough Council were held on 5 May 2005 on the same day as the other Northern Irish local government elections. The election used four district electoral areas to elect a total of 24 councillors.

== Election results ==
Ballymena Borough Council Election Result 2005
Party	Seats	Gains	Losses	Net gain/loss	Seats %	Votes %	Votes	+/−
DUP	14	3	0	▲3	58.3	55.2	14,611	▲10.3
UUP	5	0	2	▼2	20.8	21.6	5,707	▼5.9
SDLP	3	0	1	▼1	12.5	10.4	2,744	▼6.1
Sinn Féin	1	1	0	▲1	4.2	7.6	2,009	▲6.3
Independent	1	0	1	▼1	4.2	3.4	906	▼3.9
Alliance	0	0	0	Steady	0.0	1.5	404	▲0.4
PUP	0	0	0	Steady	0.0	0.4	94	▼0.4

Note: "Votes" are the first preference votes.

== Districts summary ==
Results of the Ballymena Borough Council election, 2005 by district
Ward	%	Cllrs	%	Cllrs	%	Cllrs	%	Cllrs	%	Cllrs	Total Cllrs
Ward	DUP		UUP		SDLP		Sinn Féin		Others		Total Cllrs
Ballymena North	43.7	3	21.2	2	11.0	1	5.0	0	19.1	1	7
Ballymena South	61.3	5	19.1	1	12.2	1	5.9	0	1.5	0	7
Bannside	62.3	3	18.9	1	8.6	0	10.1	1	0.0	0	5
Braid	53.8	3	27.1	1	10.0	1	9.1	0	0.0	0	5
Total	55.2	14	21.6	5	10.4	3	7.6	1	5.2	1	24

== Districts results ==
=== Ballymena North ===
2001: 2 x DUP, 2 x UUP, 2 x Independent, 1 x SDLP
2005: 3 x DUP, 2 x UUP, 1 x SDLP, 1 x Independent
2001-2005 Change: DUP gain from Independent

Ballymena North - 7 seats
Party	Candidate	FPv%	Count							
Party	Candidate	FPv%	1	2	3	4	5	6	7	8
DUP	James Alexander*	21.90%	1,503							
DUP	Maurice Mills*	13.55%	930							
Independent	James Henry*	13.20%	906							
DUP	John Carson	8.25%	566	1,125						
UUP	Neil Armstrong*	9.56%	656	693.41	839.56	875.83				
SDLP	Patrick McAvoy*	11.00%	755	756.29	762.95	764.51	1,025.51			
UUP	Joseph McKernan*	6.28%	431	445.62	499.27	512.66	512.66	520.66	536.86	878.51
Alliance	Jayne Dunlop	5.89%	404	413.03	427.09	430.08	449.08	574.08	584.34	631.34
UUP	Peter Brown	5.39%	370	388.92	432.58	449.22	453.22	456.22	475.9	
Sinn Féin	Padraig McShane	4.97%	341	341	341	341.26				
Electorate: 11,822 Valid: 6,862 (58.04%) Spoilt: 101 Quota: 858 Turnout: 6,963 (58.90%)

=== Ballymena South ===
2001: 4 x DUP, 2 x UUP, 1 x SDLP
2005: 5 x DUP, 1 x UUP, 1 x SDLP
2001-2005 Change: DUP gain from UUP

Ballymena South - 7 seats
Party	Candidate	FPv%	Count								
Party	Candidate	FPv%	1	2	3	4	5	6	7	8	9
DUP	Beth Adger*	16.25%	960								
DUP	David Tweed*	13.41%	792								
DUP	Martin Clarke*	13.15%	777								
DUP	Hubert Nicholl*	12.61%	745								
UUP	James Currie*	11.41%	674	699.2	714.68	719.09	721.99	823.99			
SDLP	Declan O'Loan*	12.16%	718	719.2	721.2	721.34	721.34	723.39	726.21	1,034.21	
DUP	Deirdre Nelson	5.86%	346	519.52	552.16	594.37	624.47	652.13	661.53	661.53	669.53
UUP	Robin Swann	4.16%	246	250.8	256.8	257.71	258.26	336.93	409.31	410.31	477.31
Sinn Féin	Daniel O'Connell	5.86%	346	346.24	346.24	346.24	346.29	347.29	347.29		
UUP	Colette Gilmour	3.54%	209	218.36	234.32	237.33	240.13				
PUP	William McCaughey	1.59%	94	99.76							
Electorate: 10,637 Valid: 5,907 (55.53%) Spoilt: 139 Quota: 739 Turnout: 6,046 (56.84%)

=== Bannside ===
2001: 3 x DUP, 1 x UUP, 1 x SDLP
2005: 3 x DUP, 1 x UUP, 1 x Sinn Féin
2001-2005 Change: Sinn Féin gain from SDLP

Bannside - 5 seats
Party	Candidate	FPv%	Count			
Party	Candidate	FPv%	1	2	3	4
DUP	Roy Gillespie*	22.95%	1,664			
UUP	William McNeilly*	18.93%	1,373			
DUP	Samuel Gaston*	13.49%	978	1,147.02	1,187.2	1,195.71
Sinn Féin	Monica Digney	11.65%	733	733.54	733.68	1,152.07
DUP	Tommy Nicholl*	13.22%	959	1,065.38	1,121.24	1,150.11
DUP	William Wilkinson	12.67%	919	1,079.38	1,105.98	1,108.8
SDLP	Seamus Laverty*	8.63%	626	628.7	660.2	
Electorate: 10,772 Valid: 7,252 (67.32%) Spoilt: 92 Quota: 1,209 Turnout: 7,344 (68.18%)

=== Braid ===
2001: 2 x DUP, 2 x UUP, 1 x SDLP
2005: 3 x DUP, 1 x UUP, 1 x SDLP
2001-2005 Change: DUP gain from UUP

Braid - 5 seats
Party	Candidate	FPv%	Count				
Party	Candidate	FPv%	1	2	3	4	5
DUP	Paul Frew	23.61%	1,524				
DUP	Samuel Hanna*	16.95%	1,094				
DUP	Robin Stirling*	13.23%	854	1,238.54			
SDLP	Margaret Gribben*	9.99%	645	647.03	647.87	686.87	1,176.87
UUP	Robin Cherry	11.59%	748	761.63	808.39	1,045.73	1,047.01
UUP	Lexie Scott	9.23%	596	619.49	686.13	847.27	849.27
Sinn Féin	Laurence O'Neill	9.13%	589	589.29	589.29	589.57	
UUP	Robert Wilson	6.26%	404	418.5	466.38		
Electorate: 9,694 Valid: 6,454 (66.58%) Spoilt: 83 Quota: 1,076 Turnout: 6,537 (67.43%)
