= Ballymena North (District Electoral Area) =

District electoral areas in Ballymena, Northern Ireland

Ballymena North DEA (1993-2014) within Ballymena

Ballymena North was one of the four district electoral areas in Ballymena, Northern Ireland which existed from 1993 to 2014. The district elected seven members to Ballymena Borough Council, and formed part of the North Antrim constituencies for the Northern Ireland Assembly and UK Parliament.

It was created for the 1993 local elections, and contained the wards of academy, Ardeevin, Ballyloughan, Dunclug, Fair Green, Galgorm and Park. It was abolished for the 2014 local elections and most of the area was transferred to the new Ballymena DEA, with Galgorm moving to the Bannside DEA.

== Councillors ==
Election	Councillor (Party)	Councillor (Party)	Councillor (Party)	Councillor (Party)	Councillor (Party)	Councillor (Party)	Councillor (Party)
2011	Patrick McAvoy (SDLP)	Jayne Dunlop (Alliance)	James McClean (UUP)	John Carson (DUP)	Audrey Wales (DUP)	Maurice Mills (DUP)	James Henry (Independent Unionist)
2005	Patrick McAvoy (SDLP)	Neil Armstrong (UUP)	Joseph McKernan (UUP)	John Carson (DUP)	James Alexander (DUP)/ (UUP)	Maurice Mills (DUP)	James Henry (Independent Unionist)
2001	Patrick McAvoy (SDLP)	Neil Armstrong (UUP)	Joseph McKernan (UUP)	William Wright (UUP)/ (Independent Unionist)	James Alexander (DUP)/ (UUP)	Maurice Mills (DUP)	James Henry (Independent Unionist)
1997	Patrick McAvoy (SDLP)	Jayne Dunlop (Alliance)	Joseph McKernan (UUP)	William Wright (UUP)/ (Independent Unionist)	James Alexander (DUP)/ (UUP)	Maurice Mills (DUP)	Samuel Henry (Independent Unionist)
1993	Patrick McAvoy (SDLP)	Gareth Williams (Alliance)	Joseph McKernan (UUP)	William Wright (UUP)/ (Independent Unionist)	James Alexander (DUP)/ (UUP)	Maurice Mills (DUP)	Samuel Henry (Independent Unionist)

== 2011 Election ==
2005: 3 x DUP, 2 x UUP, 1 x SDLP, 1 x Independent

2011: 3 x DUP, 1 x UUP, 1 x SDLP, 1 x Alliance, 1 x Independent

2005-2011 Change: Alliance gain from UUP

Ballymena North - 7 seats
Party	Candidate	FPv%	Count								
Party	Candidate	FPv%	1	2	3	4	5	6	7	8	9
Independent	James Henry*	17.13%	1,026								
DUP	John Carson*	15.71%	941								
DUP	Maurice Mills*	12.45%	746	787.44							
SDLP	Patrick McAvoy*	9.95%	596	617.84	619.31	622.15	910.15				
UUP	James McClean	7.28%	436	477.72	485.7	503.9	505.18	509.18	512.96	826.96	
DUP	Audrey Wales	7.53%	451	479.56	643.36	664.77	666.05	674.05	700.51	745.78	780.1
Alliance	Jayne Dunlop	6.94%	416	463.88	466.61	474.45	492.01	624.01	625.63	674.96	699.05
TUV	James Alexander*	6.49%	389	412.52	417.98	575.88	575.88	575.88	577.23	620.8	638.95
UUP	Neil Armstrong*	6.94%	416	463.32	468.57	481.25	481.25	482.25	486.3		
Sinn Féin	Sean Davey	5.94%	356	357.96	357.96	357.96					
TUV	David Lynn	3.64%	218	232.56	237.81						
Electorate: 12,118 Valid: 5,991 (49.44%) Spoilt: 118 Quota: 749 Turnout: 6,109 (50.41%)

== 2005 Election ==
2001: 2 x DUP, 2 x UUP, 2 x Independent, 1 x SDLP

2005: 3 x DUP, 2 x UUP, 1 x SDLP, 1 x Independent

2001-2005 Change: DUP gain from Independent

Ballymena North - 7 seats
Party	Candidate	FPv%	Count							
Party	Candidate	FPv%	1	2	3	4	5	6	7	8
DUP	James Alexander*	21.90%	1,503							
DUP	Maurice Mills*	13.55%	930							
Independent	James Henry*	13.20%	906							
DUP	John Carson	8.25%	566	1,125						
UUP	Neil Armstrong*	9.56%	656	693.41	839.56	875.83				
SDLP	Patrick McAvoy*	11.00%	755	756.29	762.95	764.51	1,025.51			
UUP	Joseph McKernan*	6.28%	431	445.62	499.27	512.66	512.66	520.66	536.86	878.51
Alliance	Jayne Dunlop	5.89%	404	413.03	427.09	430.08	449.08	574.08	584.34	631.34
UUP	Peter Brown	5.39%	370	388.92	432.58	449.22	453.22	456.22	475.9	
Sinn Féin	Padraig McShane	4.97%	341	341	341	341.26				
Electorate: 11,822 Valid: 6,862 (58.04%) Spoilt: 101 Quota: 858 Turnout: 6,963 (58.90%)

== 2001 Election ==
1997: 3 x UUP, 2 x DUP, 1 x SDLP, 1 x Alliance, 1 x Independent Unionist

2001: 2 x DUP, 2 x UUP, 2 x Independent, 1 x SDLP

1997-2001 Change: DUP gain from Alliance, Independent leaves UUP and Independent Unionist becomes Independent

Ballymena North - 7 seats
Party	Candidate	FPv%	Count										
Party	Candidate	FPv%	1	2	3	4	5	6	7	8	9	10	11
DUP	James Alexander*	14.34%	1,110										
SDLP	Patrick McAvoy*	13.83%	1,071										
Independent	James Henry	13.69%	1,060										
UUP	Joseph McKernan*	7.92%	613	614.32	616.32	625.12	642.58	806.06	855.29	942.07	992.25		
DUP	Maurice Mills*	8.07%	625	663.28	673.4	674.1	680.76	684.04	705.49	711.56	713.86	1,092.86	
Independent	William Wright*	7.14%	553	557.32	561.32	561.72	578.28	584.37	651.57	691.17	709.97	753.83	835.94
UUP	Neil Armstrong	6.88%	533	538.28	540.4	541.5	551.58	585.49	613.77	682.18	701.58	732.55	760.09
UUP	Gillian Scott	6.87%	532	534.04	538.04	539.94	546.6	569.19	598.75	698.32	706.41	719.98	734.26
DUP	Simon Hamilton	5.31%	411	489.24	494.6	494.8	499.21	504.63	516.99	525.11	526.41		
Sinn Féin	Gerard Magee	4.93%	382	382	382	429	429.72	429.72	433.22	454.9			
Alliance	Jayne Dunlop*	4.09%	317	318.08	319.08	348.28	357.28	358.47	427.39				
Independent	Audrey Wales	3.40%	263	263.6	265.6	275	288.68	302.13					
UUP	William McElfatrick	3.13%	242	242.72	242.72	244.12	250.87						
PUP	William Parkhill	0.39%	30	30.6									
Electorate: 12,285 Valid: 7,742 (63.02%) Spoilt: 134 Quota: 968 Turnout: 7,876 (64.11%)

== 1997 Election ==
1993: 3 x UUP, 1 x DUP, 1 x SDLP, 1 x Alliance, 1 x Independent Unionist

1997: 3 x UUP, 1 x DUP, 1 x SDLP, 1 x Alliance, 1 x Independent Unionist

1993-1997 Change: No change

Ballymena North - 7 seats
Party	Candidate	FPv%	Count					
Party	Candidate	FPv%	1	2	3	4	5	6
SDLP	Patrick McAvoy*	16.84%	975					
UUP	William Wright*	16.46%	953					
Ind. Unionist	Samuel Henry*	12.58%	728					
UUP	Joseph McKernan*	10.88%	630	669.9	785.34			
UUP	James Alexander*	9.45%	547	551.8	620.92	675.52	778.52	
DUP	Maurice Mills*	10.54%	610	610.3	624.46	626.15	650.28	768.28
Alliance	Jayne Dunlop	7.72%	447	641.4	645	645.91	700.61	703.09
DUP	John Stewart	7.20%	417	417.3	428.1	429.4	439.14	562.22
DUP	David Warwick	4.27%	247	247.3	253.78	253.91	269.15	
Ind. Unionist	Herbert Park	4.06%	235	242.2	246.28	247.58		
Electorate: 12,239 Valid: 5,789 (47.30%) Spoilt: 81 Quota: 724 Turnout: 5,870 (47.96%)

== 1993 Election ==
1993: 3 x UUP, 1 x Alliance, 1 x DUP, 1 x SDLP, 1 x Independent Unionist

Ballymena North - 7 seats
Party	Candidate	FPv%	Count							
Party	Candidate	FPv%	1	2	3	4	5	6	7	8
Ind. Unionist	Samuel Henry*	15.50%	964							
SDLP	Patrick McAvoy*	13.83%	860							
UUP	William Wright	13.19%	820							
Alliance	Gareth Williams*	11.69%	727	765.6	800.8					
UUP	James Alexander*	10.95%	681	727.4	728.4	751.45	771.05	791.05		
DUP	Maurice Mills*	7.24%	450	461.8	462	463.35	468.05	671.55	951.55	
UUP	Joseph McKernan*	7.93%	493	539.6	545.2	555.7	568.5	574.55	615.05	684.05
Alliance	Ethel Kenny	7.94%	494	521	553.2	555	569.9	573.9	582.85	593.85
DUP	John Wilson*	5.53%	344	350.2	350.2	351.75	359.15	423.25		
DUP	John Carson	4.66%	290	293.2	293.2	293.5	306.5			
Ulster Democratic	Samuel Balmer	1.53%	95	100.2	101.1	102.15				
Electorate: 12,034 Valid: 6,218 (51.67%) Spoilt: 72 Quota: 778 Turnout: 6,290 (52.27%)
