= Paul Frew =

Northern Ireland politician (born 1974)

Paul Frew MLA
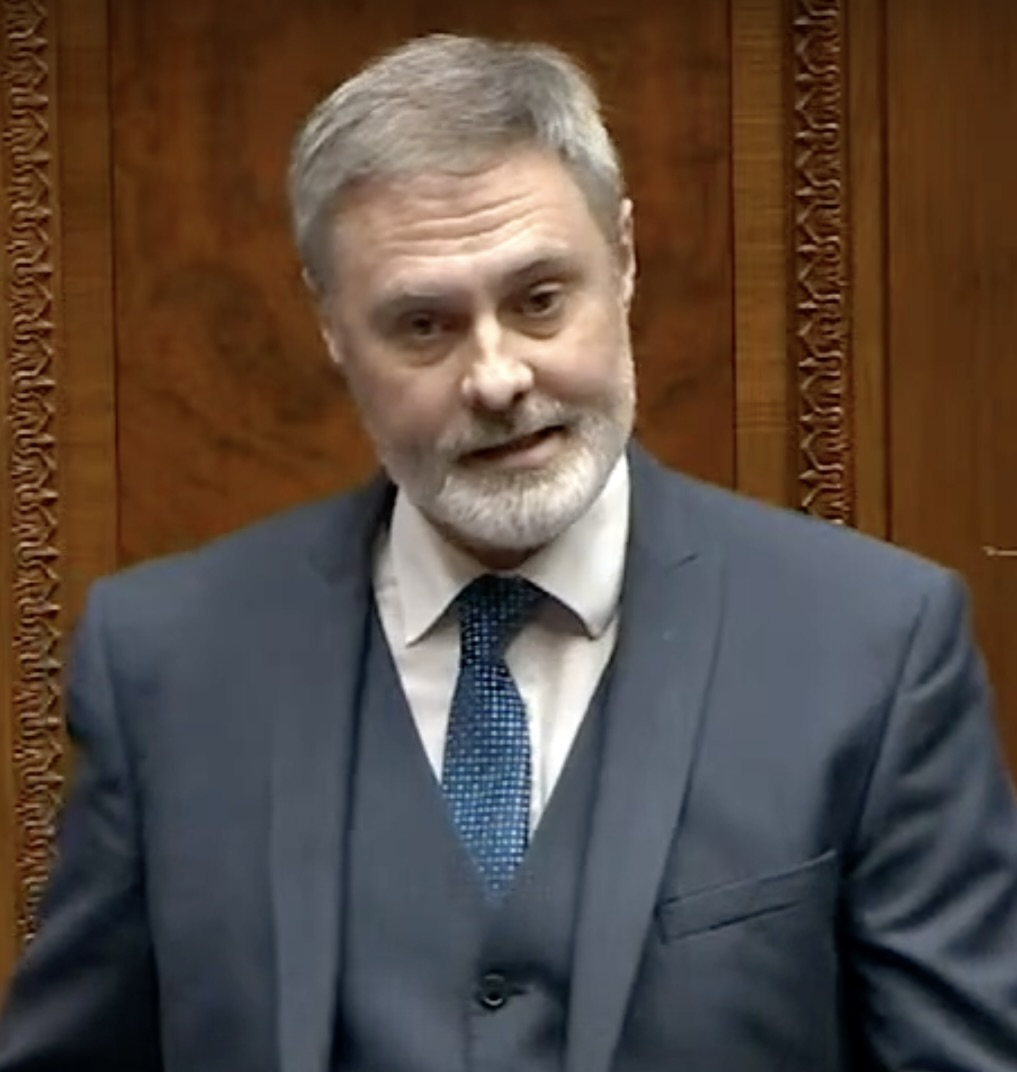
- Frew in 2024

Minister for the Economy
- In office 14 June 2021 – 6 July 2021
- Preceded by: The Lady Dodds of Duncairn
- Succeeded by: Gordon Lyons

Member of the Northern Ireland Assembly for North Antrim
- Incumbent
- Assumed office 21 June 2010
- Preceded by: Ian Paisley Jr

Ballymena Borough Councillor for Braid
- In office 5 May 2005 – 22 May 2014
- Preceded by: David Clyde
- Succeeded by: Council abolished

Personal details
- Born: 20 September 1974 (age 52) Kells, Northern Ireland
- Party: DUP

Paul Frew (born 20 September 1974) is a Democratic Unionist Party (DUP) politician who served as Minister for the Economy from June to July 2021. He has been a Member of the Legislative Assembly (MLA) for North Antrim since 2010. Frew is the current Chairperson of the Committee for Justice , having previously chaired the Justice Committee in 2016–17 before the Assembly collapsed. Frew was previously a Ballymena Borough Councillor for the Braid DEA from 2005 to 2014.

== Background ==
A native of Kells, he is an electrician by trade and did not go to third-level education, commenting in one interview "my university was the building sites of Belfast".

He served in the Royal Irish Regiment.

== Political career ==
Frew joined the DUP in 2000, and was elected at the 2005 local elections to Ballymena Borough Council, representing the Braid District.

=== Member of the Northern Ireland Assembly ===
In 2010, he replaced Ian Paisley Jr as a Member of the Northern Ireland Assembly for North Antrim.

In June 2021, Frew was appointed Minister for the Economy, succeeding party colleague Diane Dodds. A month later, he was replaced by Gordon Lyons.

== Personal life ==
He plays the spoons.

Northern Ireland Assembly
Preceded by Ian Paisley Jr	MLA for North Antrim; 2010–present	Incumbent
