= Ballymena South (District Electoral Area) =

District electoral areas in Ballymena, Northern Ireland

Ballymena South DEA (1993-2014) within Ballymena

Ballymena South was one of the four district electoral areas in Ballymena, Northern Ireland which existed from 1993 to 2014. The district elected seven members to Ballymena Borough Council, and formed part of the North Antrim constituencies for the Northern Ireland Assembly and UK Parliament.

It was created for the 1993 local elections, and contained the wards of Ballee, Ballykeel, Castle Demesne, Harryville, Kells, Moat and Summerfield. It was abolished for the 2014 local elections and most of the area was transferred to the new Ballymena DEA, with Ballee, Harryville and Kells moving to the Braid DEA.

== Councillors ==
Election	Councillor (Party)	Councillor (Party)	Councillor (Party)	Councillor (Party)	Councillor (Party)	Councillor (Party)	Councillor (Party)
2011	Declan O'Loan (SDLP)	James Currie (UUP)	Desmond Robinson (DUP)	Beth Adger (DUP)	Hubert Nicholl (DUP)	Martin Clarke (DUP)	David Tweed (TUV)/ (DUP)
2005	Declan O'Loan (SDLP)	James Currie (UUP)	Deirdre Nelson (DUP)	Beth Adger (DUP)	Hubert Nicholl (DUP)	Martin Clarke (DUP)	David Tweed (TUV)/ (DUP)
2001	Declan O'Loan (SDLP)	James Currie (UUP)	Peter Brown (UUP)	Beth Adger (DUP)	Hubert Nicholl (DUP)	Martin Clarke (DUP)	David Tweed (TUV)/ (DUP)
1997	Declan O'Loan (SDLP)	James Currie (UUP)	Peter Brown (UUP)	Malcolm Gilmour (UUP)	Hubert Nicholl (DUP)	Martin Clarke (DUP)	David Tweed (TUV)/ (DUP)
1993	Declan O'Loan (SDLP)	James Currie (UUP)	John Scott (UUP)	William Brownlees (Independent Unionist)	James McCosh (DUP)	Martin Clarke (DUP)	Frederick Coulter (DUP)

== 2011 Election ==
2005: 5 x DUP, 1 x UUP, 1 x SDLP

2011: 4 x DUP, 1 x UUP, 1 x TUV, 1 x SDLP

2005-2011 Change: TUV gain from DUP

Ballymena South - 7 seats
Party	Candidate	FPv%	Count							
Party	Candidate	FPv%	1	2	3	4	5	6	7	8
DUP	Beth Adger*	14.98%	746							
SDLP	Declan O'Loan*	12.37%	616	627						
DUP	Hubert Nicholl*	10.92%	544	559	575.64	707.64				
DUP	Martin Clarke*	10.26%	511	522	583.92	627.92				
DUP	Desmond Robinson	9.92%	494	499	506.04	570.92	648.64			
TUV	David Tweed*	8.03%	400	408	409.44	412.08	413.42	416.66	417.66	662.66
UUP	James Currie*	8.41%	419	426	430	443.8	448.49	463.61	506.61	518.77
UUP	Robin Swann	6.47%	322	330	332.4	338.04	338.04	344.52	356.52	391.68
TUV	Jeremy Saulters	5.94%	296	298	299.28	304.28	304.28	304.82	310.82	
Sinn Féin	Thomas O'Hara	5.74%	286	289	289	289	289	289		
DUP	Gayle Nelson	5.08%	253	260	282.56					
Independent	Deirdre Nelson*	1.87%	93							
Electorate: 10,675 Valid: 4,980 (46.65%) Spoilt: 139 Quota: 623 Turnout: 5,119 (47.95%)

== 2005 Election ==
2001: 4 x DUP, 2 x UUP, 1 x SDLP

2005: 5 x DUP, 1 x UUP, 1 x SDLP

2001-2005 Change: DUP gain from UUP

Ballymena South - 7 seats
Party	Candidate	FPv%	Count								
Party	Candidate	FPv%	1	2	3	4	5	6	7	8	9
DUP	Beth Adger*	16.25%	960								
DUP	David Tweed*	13.41%	792								
DUP	Martin Clarke*	13.15%	777								
DUP	Hubert Nicholl*	12.61%	745								
UUP	James Currie*	11.41%	674	699.2	714.68	719.09	721.99	823.99			
SDLP	Declan O'Loan*	12.16%	718	719.2	721.2	721.34	721.34	723.39	726.21	1,034.21	
DUP	Deirdre Nelson	5.86%	346	519.52	552.16	594.37	624.47	652.13	661.53	661.53	669.53
UUP	Robin Swann	4.16%	246	250.8	256.8	257.71	258.26	336.93	409.31	410.31	477.31
Sinn Féin	Daniel O'Connell	5.86%	346	346.24	346.24	346.24	346.29	347.29	347.29		
UUP	Colette Gilmour	3.54%	209	218.36	234.32	237.33	240.13				
PUP	William McCaughey	1.59%	94	99.76							
Electorate: 10,637 Valid: 5,907 (55.53%) Spoilt: 139 Quota: 739 Turnout: 6,046 (56.84%)

== 2001 Election ==
1997 3 x DUP, 3 x UUP, 1 x SDLP

2001 4 x DUP, 2 x UUP, 1 x SDLP

1997-2001 Change: DUP gain from UUP

Ballymena South - 7 seats
Party	Candidate	FPv%	Count							
Party	Candidate	FPv%	1	2	3	4	5	6	7	8
SDLP	Declan O'Loan*	17.29%	1,212							
UUP	James Currie*	15.58%	1,092							
DUP	Beth Adger	15.14%	1,061							
DUP	David Tweed*	14.52%	1,018							
DUP	Martin Clarke*	11.31%	793	798.72	805.92	875.45	960.85			
DUP	Hubert Nicholl*	10.77%	755	759.84	770.44	859.35	894.91			
UUP	Peter Brown*	6.55%	459	543.48	624.48	635.19	640.65	649.61	668.38	757.76
UUP	William Moore	4.07%	285	376.52	476.52	479.41	480.53	484.17	511.16	601.89
Independent	David Warwick	3.44%	241	364.2	372	375.23	380.97	387.27	409.61	
PUP	William McCaughey	0.73%	51	59.36	60.56	61.58	62.98	65.08		
PUP	Jean Rainey	0.61%	43	59.28	61.28	61.79	62.91	64.31		
Electorate: 11,772 Valid: 7,010 (59.55%) Spoilt: 136 Quota: 877 Turnout: 7,146 (60.70%)

== 1997 Election ==
1993: 3 x DUP, 2 x UUP, 1 x SDLP, 1 x Independent Unionist

1997: 3 x DUP, 3 x UUP, 1 x SDLP

1993-1997 Change: UUP gain from Independent Unionist

Ballymena South - 7 seats
Party	Candidate	FPv%	Count								
Party	Candidate	FPv%	1	2	3	4	5	6	7	8	9
SDLP	Declan O'Loan*	17.56%	967								
UUP	James Currie*	16.67%	918								
DUP	David Tweed	15.11%	832								
DUP	Martin Clarke*	10.37%	571	576.6	581.02	604.99	614.81	655.29	896.29		
DUP	Hubert Nicholl	9.70%	534	535.68	544	575.45	585	622.43	714.87		
UUP	Peter Brown	6.85%	377	425.72	478.24	481.64	524.27	548.93	559.69	583.69	586.41
UUP	Malcolm Gilmour	6.63%	365	390.76	472.66	479.63	495.69	538.51	556.29	577.29	580.86
UUP	John Scott*	6.48%	357	410.2	473.9	479.51	499.95	534.81	546.52	565.52	567.56
DUP	John Carson	5.72%	315	316.68	320.84	369.63	379.16	397.12			
Ind. Unionist	Agnes McLeister	3.34%	184	196.32	203.6	219.75	240.93				
Ind. Unionist	Samuel Balmer	1.56%	86	210.32	214.74	216.1					
Electorate: 12,043 Valid: 5,506 (45.72%) Spoilt: 116 Quota: 689 Turnout: 5,622 (46.68%)

== 1993 Election ==
1993: 3 x DUP, 2 x UUP, 1 x SDLP, 1 x Independent Unionist

Ballymena South - 7 seats
Party	Candidate	FPv%	Count							
Party	Candidate	FPv%	1	2	3	4	5	6	7	8
Ind. Unionist	William Brownlees*	22.64%	1,301							
SDLP	Declan O'Loan	17.77%	1,021							
UUP	John Scott	14.41%	828							
UUP	James Currie*	10.30%	592	946						
DUP	Martin Clarke*	9.99%	574	649.5	654.06	684.06	703.56	720.56		
DUP	James McCosh*	9.55%	549	580	581.71	602.21	611.96	615.92	677.74	686.08
DUP	Frederick Coulter	4.63%	266	304.5	306.21	322.71	337.96	342.46	493.03	522.35
Ind. Unionist	Agnes McLeister	3.90%	224	263.5	278.89	346.39	381.39	403.74	415.99	499.09
Independent	Charles Magill	1.56%	66	80.5	236.11	257.11	265.11	405.78	409.35	
DUP	John McKendry	4.07%	234	247	250.42	255.92	264.17	271.49		
Ind. Unionist	Melvyn McKendry	1.58%	91	107	224.42	242.42	252.92			
Electorate: 12,121 Valid: 5,746 (47.41%) Spoilt: 141 Quota: 719 Turnout: 5,887 (48.57%)
