= Braid (District Electoral Area) =

District electoral area in Northern Ireland

- Mid and East Antrim Borough Council DEA constituency

Current constituency
- Created: 1993
- Seats: 5 (1993-2014); 7 (2014-)
- Councillors: Alan Barr (UUP); Chelsea Harwood (APNI); Christopher Jamieson (TUV); Ruth Lawrence (DUP); William McCaughey (DUP); Archie Rae (SF); Matthew Warwick (TUV)

Braid DEA (1993-2014) within Ballymena

Map of Ballymena, with the Braid DEA (1993-2014) highlighted

Braid is one of the seven district electoral areas (DEA) in Mid and East Antrim, Northern Ireland. The district elects seven members to Mid and East Antrim District Council and contains the wards of Ballee and Harryville, Broughshane, Glenravel, Glenwhirry, Kells, Kirkinriola and Slemish. Braid forms part of the North Antrim constituencies for the Northern Ireland Assembly and UK Parliament.

It was created for the 1993 local elections, where it contained five wards (Broughshane, Craigywarren, Glenravel, Glenwhirry and Slemish), replacing the Braid Valley DEA which had existed since 1985. For the 2014 local elections it gained two additional wards, gaining Ballee and Harryville and Kells from the abolished Ballymena South DEA.

== Councillors ==
Election	Councillor (Party)	Councillor (Party)	Councillor (Party)	Councillor (Party)	Councillor (Party)	Councillor (Party)	Councillor (Party)
March 2025 Co-Option	Chelsea Harwood (Alliance)	Alan Barr (UUP)	Archie Rae (Sinn Féin)	Ruth Lawrence (DUP)	Christopher Jamieson (TUV)	William McCaughey (DUP)	Matthew Warwick (TUV)
2023	Chelsea Harwood (Alliance)	Alan Barr (UUP)	Archie Rae (Sinn Féin)	Beth Adger (DUP)	Christopher Jamieson (TUV)	William McCaughey (DUP)	Matthew Warwick (TUV)
October 2020 Co-Option	David Reid (Alliance)	Robin Cherry (UUP)	Julie Frew (DUP)	Beth Adger (DUP)	Christopher Jamieson (TUV)	William McCaughey (DUP)	Brian Collins (TUV)
2019	Muriel Burnside (Alliance)	Robin Cherry (UUP)	Julie Frew (DUP)	Beth Adger (DUP)	Christopher Jamieson (TUV)	William McCaughey (DUP)	Brian Collins (TUV)
August 2016 Defection	Paul Maguire (Sinn Féin)/ (Independent)	Robin Cherry (UUP)	Beth Clyde (DUP)	Beth Adger (DUP)	Samuel Hanna (DUP)	William McCaughey (DUP)	Brian Collins (TUV)
2014	Paul Maguire (Sinn Féin)/ (Independent)	Robin Cherry (UUP)	Beth Clyde (DUP)	Beth Adger (DUP)	Samuel Hanna (DUP)	William McCaughey (DUP)	Brian Collins (TUV)
2011	Paul Maguire (Sinn Féin)/ (Independent)	Robin Cherry (UUP)	Beth Clyde (DUP)	Paul Frew (DUP)	Samuel Hanna (DUP)	5 seats 1993–2014	5 seats 1993–2014
2005	Margaret Gribben (SDLP)	Robin Cherry (UUP)	Robin Stirling (DUP)	Paul Frew (DUP)	Samuel Hanna (DUP)	5 seats 1993–2014	5 seats 1993–2014
2001	Margaret Gribben (SDLP)	Lexie Scott (UUP)	Robin Stirling (DUP)	David Clyde (UUP)	Samuel Hanna (DUP)	5 seats 1993–2014	5 seats 1993–2014
1997	Margaret Gribben (SDLP)	Lexie Scott (UUP)	Desmond Armstrong (UUP)	David Clyde (UUP)	Samuel Hanna (DUP)	5 seats 1993–2014	5 seats 1993–2014
1993	David McClintock (DUP)	Robert Forsythe (UUP)	Desmond Armstrong (UUP)	David Clyde (UUP)	Samuel Hanna (DUP)	5 seats 1993–2014	5 seats 1993–2014

== 2023 Election ==
2019: 3 x DUP, 2 x TUV, 1 x UUP, 1 x Alliance

2023: 2 x DUP, 2 x TUV, 1 x UUP, 1 x Sinn Féin, 1 x Alliance

2019–2023 Change: Sinn Féin gain from DUP

Braid - 7 seats
Party	Candidate	FPv%	Count							
Party	Candidate	FPv%	1	2	3	4	5	6	7	8
Sinn Féin	Archie Rae	13.76%	1,302							
DUP	Beth Adger* †	13.17%	1,246							
DUP	William McCaughey*	12.93%	1,224							
TUV	Christopher Jamieson*	12.63%	1,195							
UUP	Alan Barr	11.18%	1,058	1,059.4	1,612.4					
Alliance	Chelsea Harwood	10.74%	1,016	1,121.6	1,146.1	1,232.1				
TUV	Matthew Warwick	8.88%	840	840.5	940.5	1,128.5	1,134.95	1,146.95	1,152.17	1,162.63
DUP	Julie Philpott	9.21%	872	872.2	893.2	1,045.2	1,098.6	1,120.6	1,150.87	1,152.04
UUP	Keith Turner*	7.50%	710	710.9						
Electorate: 17,809 Valid: 9,463 (53.14%) Spoilt: 89 Quota: 1,183 Turnout: 9,552 (53.64%)

== 2019 Election ==
2014: 4 x DUP, 1 x TUV, 1 x UUP, 1 x Sinn Féin

2019: 3 x DUP, 2 x TUV, 1 x UUP, 1 x Alliance

2014-2019 Change: TUV and Alliance gain from DUP and Sinn Féin

Braid - 7 seats
Party	Candidate	FPv%	Count						
Party	Candidate	FPv%	1	2	3	4	5	6	7
UUP	Robin Cherry*	12.26%	1,084	1,107					
DUP	Beth Adger*	11.03%	975	982	1,284				
Alliance	Muriel Burnside †	7.95%	703	896	896	896	896.08	1,296.08	
DUP	Julie Frew	10.48%	926	933	1,077	1,103.55	1,103.59	1,106.59	
DUP	William McCaughey*	9.33%	825	827	907	1,050.96	1,051.04	1,054.04	1,058.04
TUV	Christopher Jamieson	10.20%	902	909	964	966.36	966.36	972.36	983.36
TUV	Brian Collins*	9.86%	872	881	894	896.36	896.52	898.52	905.52
UUP	Keith Turner	9.05%	800	816	827	827.59	828.03	848.03	898.03
Sinn Féin	Colette McAllister	7.14%	631	827	827	827	827.04		
DUP	Sam Hanna	6.85%	605	606					
Independent	Marian Maguire	4.20%	371						
Independent	Roni Browne	1.65%	146						
Electorate: 16,951 Valid: 8,840 (52.15%) Spoilt: 96 Quota: 1,106 Turnout: 8,936 (52.72%)

== 2014 Election ==
2011: 3 x DUP, 1 x UUP, 1 x Sinn Féin

2014: 4 x DUP, 1 x UUP, 1 x TUV, 1 x Sinn Féin

2011-2014 Change: DUP and TUV gain due to the addition of two seats

Braid - 7 seats
Party	Candidate	FPv%	Count								
Party	Candidate	FPv%	1	2	3	4	5	6	7	8	9
DUP	Beth Clyde*	9.81%	865	890	1,210						
DUP	William McCaughey*	10.57%	932	955	1,038	1,112.46					
TUV	Brian Collins	10.35%	912	939	945	945.34	954.34	1,416.34			
UUP	Robin Cherry*	10.90%	961	1,009	1,027	1,028.36	1,057.36	1,090.36	1,160.92		
DUP	Beth Adger*	10.11%	891	934	990	1,011.76	1,021.76	1,058.1	1,153.02		
Sinn Féin	Paul Maguire* ‡	8.19%	722	736	737	737	1,044	1,045	1,045	1,045	1,045
DUP	Samuel Hanna*	9.08%	800	808	845	851.8	863.14	881.14	923.14	935.74	978.49
UUP	Brian Thompson	6.34%	559	618	666	668.04	692.04	745.04	848.35	889.52	897.5
TUV	Roy McPeake	6.77%	597	632	645	645.34	649.34				
SDLP	Catherine O'Hara	5.95%	524	606	608	608.68					
DUP	Chris Wales	6.46%	569	590							
Alliance	Danny Donnelly	3.39%	299								
PUP	William Parkhill	2.08%	183								
Electorate: 16,543 Valid: 8,814 (53.28%) Spoilt: 88 Quota: 1,102 Turnout: 8,902 (53.81%)

== 2011 Election ==
2005: 3 x DUP, 1 x UUP, 1 x SDLP
2011: 3 x DUP, 1 x UUP, 1 x Sinn Féin
2005-2011 Change: Sinn Féin gain from SDLP

Braid - 5 seats
Party	Candidate	FPv%	Count						
Party	Candidate	FPv%	1	2	3	4	5	6	7
DUP	Paul Frew*	23.91%	1,511						
DUP	Beth Clyde	14.59%	922	1,240.3					
DUP	Samuel Hanna*	13.99%	884	958.7	1,118.84				
Sinn Féin	Paul Maguire	9.08%	574	574.3	574.3	632.6	633.6	962.5	963.14
UUP	Robin Cherry*	10.95%	692	706.1	711.88	712.88	859.66	883.66	910.06
UUP	Lexie Scott	9.84%	622	646	653.99	658.99	805.93	847.4	884.84
SDLP	Cahal Kerr	6.47%	409	411.7	412.21	558.51	561.51		
TUV	Samuel Gaston*	7.28%	460	467.8	470.01	477.01			
Independent	Catherine O'Hara	3.89%	246	246.9	247.07				
Electorate: 10,688 Valid: 6,320 (59.13%) Spoilt: 90 Quota: 1,054 Turnout: 6,410 (59.97%)

== 2005 Election ==
2001: 2 x DUP, 2 x UUP, 1 x SDLP

2005: 3 x DUP, 1 x UUP, 1 x SDLP

2001-2005 Change: DUP gain from UUP

Braid - 5 seats
Party	Candidate	FPv%	Count				
Party	Candidate	FPv%	1	2	3	4	5
DUP	Paul Frew	23.61%	1,524				
DUP	Samuel Hanna*	16.95%	1,094				
DUP	Robin Stirling*	13.23%	854	1,238.54			
SDLP	Margaret Gribben*	9.99%	645	647.03	647.87	686.87	1,176.87
UUP	Robin Cherry	11.59%	748	761.63	808.39	1,045.73	1,047.01
UUP	Lexie Scott*	9.23%	596	619.49	686.13	847.27	849.27
Sinn Féin	Laurence O'Neill	9.13%	589	589.29	589.29	589.57	
UUP	Robert Wilson	6.26%	404	418.5	466.38		
Electorate: 9,694 Valid: 6,454 (66.58%) Spoilt: 83 Quota: 1,076 Turnout: 6,537 (67.43%)

== 2001 Election ==
1997: 3 x UUP, 1 x DUP, 1 x SDLP

2001: 2 x DUP, 2 x UUP, 1 x SDLP

1997-2001 Change: DUP gain from UUP

Braid - 5 seats
Party	Candidate	FPv%	Count					
Party	Candidate	FPv%	1	2	3	4	5	6
DUP	Samuel Hanna	18.75%	1,242					
SDLP	Margaret Gribben*	17.48%	1,158					
DUP	Robin Stirling*	12.36%	819	831.54	833.54	834.35	1,461.35	
UUP	David Clyde*	14.51%	961	964.52	972.52	998.71	1,035.71	1,120.71
UUP	Lexie Scott*	13.48%	893	899.93	903.15	912.42	964.99	1,018.99
UUP	Desmond Armstrong*	12.30%	815	815	817	829.42	856.82	905.82
DUP	Robert Osborne	10.67%	707	817.22	826.33	827.23		
PUP	Robert Hamilton	0.44%	29	29.33				
Electorate: 9,397 Valid: 6,624 (70.49%) Spoilt: 88 Quota: 1,105 Turnout: 6,712 (71.43%)

== 1997 Election ==
1993: 3 x UUP, 2 x DUP

1997: 3 x UUP, 1 x DUP, 1 x SDLP

1993-1997 Change: SDLP gain from DUP

Braid - 5 seats
Party	Candidate	FPv%	Count				
Party	Candidate	FPv%	1	2	3	4	5
SDLP	Margaret Gribben	19.57%	1,042				
UUP	David Clyde*	18.05%	961				
UUP	Desmond Armstrong*	15.33%	816	919.48			
DUP	Samuel Hanna*	11.70%	623	632.36	1,029.36		
UUP	Lexie Scott	14.37%	765	794.12	812.2	814.72	878.48
DUP	Samuel Gaston	11.78%	627	629.08	690.72	826.8	833.92
DUP	David McClintock*	9.20%	490	497.8			
Electorate: 9,081 Valid: 5,324 (58.63%) Spoilt: 91 Quota: 888 Turnout: 5,415 (59.63%)

== 1993 Election ==
1993: 3 x UUP, 2 x DUP

Braid - 5 seats
Party	Candidate	FPv%	Count					
Party	Candidate	FPv%	1	2	3	4	5	6
UUP	David Clyde*	27.31%	1,304					
UUP	Desmond Armstrong*	21.76%	1,039					
UUP	Robert Forsythe	16.57%	791	1,196.45				
DUP	Samuel Hanna*	13.68%	653	678.2	718.25	838.33		
DUP	David McClintock*	9.15%	437	460.85	482	508.86	582.21	618.61
DUP	Samuel Wallace	8.06%	385	420.55	439	501.41	609.27	614.47
DUP	Samuel Martin	3.48%	166	182.2	196.15	229.33		
Electorate: 8,781 Valid: 4,775 (54.38%) Spoilt: 143 Quota: 796 Turnout: 4,918 (56.01%)
