= Bannside (District Electoral Area) =

District electoral area in Northern Ireland

- Mid and East Antrim Borough Council DEA constituency

Current constituency
- Created: 1993
- Seats: 5 (1993-2014); 6 (2014-)
- Councillors: Ian Friary (SF); Thomas Gordon (DUP); Anna Henry (TUV); Tyler Hoey (DUP); Stewart McDonald (TUV); Jackson Minford (UUP)

Bannside DEA within Mid and East Antrim

Bannside DEA (1993-2014) within Ballymena

Bannside is one of the seven district electoral areas (DEA) in Mid and East Antrim, Northern Ireland. The district elects six members to Mid and East Antrim District Council and contains the wards of Ahoghill, Cullybackey, Galgorm, Grange, Maine and Portglenone. Bannside forms part of the North Antrim constituencies for the Northern Ireland Assembly and UK Parliament.

It was created for the 1993 local elections, where it contained five wards (Ahoghill, Cullybackey, Dunminning, Grange and Portglenone), replacing The Main DEA which had existed since 1985. For the 2014 local elections it gained an additional ward, gaining Galgorm from the abolished Ballymena North DEA.

== Councillors ==
Election	Councillor (Party)	Councillor (Party)	Councillor (Party)	Councillor (Party)	Councillor (Party)	Councillor (Party)
July 2024 Co-Option	Ian Friary (Sinn Féin)	Jackson Minford (UUP)	Tyler Hoey (DUP)	Thomas Gordon (DUP)	Anna Henry (TUV)	Stewart McDonald (TUV)
2023	Ian Friary (Sinn Féin)	Jackson Minford (UUP)	Tyler Hoey (DUP)	Thomas Gordon (DUP)	Timothy Gaston (TUV)	Stewart McDonald (TUV)
2019	Ian Friary (Sinn Féin)	William McNeilly (UUP)	Tommy Nicholl (DUP)	Thomas Gordon (DUP)	Timothy Gaston (TUV)	Stewart McDonald (TUV)
2014	Patrice Hardy (Sinn Féin)	William McNeilly (UUP)	Tommy Nicholl (DUP)	Billy Henry (DUP)	Timothy Gaston (TUV)	Stewart McDonald (TUV)
2011	Monica Digney (Sinn Féin)	William McNeilly (UUP)	Tommy Nicholl (DUP)	Billy Henry (DUP)	Roy Gillespie (TUV)/ (DUP)	5 seats 1993–2014
2005	Monica Digney (Sinn Féin)	William McNeilly (UUP)	Tommy Nicholl (DUP)	Samuel Gaston (DUP)	Roy Gillespie (TUV)/ (DUP)	5 seats 1993–2014
2001	Seamus Laverty (SDLP)	William McNeilly (UUP)	Tommy Nicholl (DUP)	Samuel Gaston (DUP)	Roy Gillespie (TUV)/ (DUP)	5 seats 1993–2014
1997	Robert Coulter (UUP)	Ian Johnston (UUP)	Tommy Nicholl (DUP)	Sandy Spence (DUP)	Roy Gillespie (TUV)/ (DUP)	5 seats 1993–2014
1993	Robert Coulter (UUP)	Ian Johnston (UUP)	Tommy Nicholl (DUP)	Sandy Spence (DUP)	Roy Gillespie (TUV)/ (DUP)	5 seats 1993–2014

== 2023 Election ==
2019: 2 x TUV, 2 x DUP, 1 x UUP, 1 x Sinn Féin

2023: 2 x TUV, 2 x DUP, 1 x Sinn Féin, 1 x UUP

2019–2023 Change: No change

Bannside - 6 seats
Party	Candidate	FPv%	Count					
Party	Candidate	FPv%	1	2	3	4	5	6
TUV	Timothy Gaston* †	16.72%	1,468					
TUV	Stewart McDonald*	16.42%	1,442					
Sinn Féin	Ian Friary*	14.72%	1,292					
DUP	Thomas Gordon*	14.31%	1,256					
DUP	Tyler Hoey	9.54%	838	865.45	867.45	892.28	892.43	1,295.83
UUP	Jackson Minford	10.74%	943	957.1	965.1	983.69	984.14	1,238.67
Alliance	Jack Gibson	8.75%	768	773.25	961.25	965.02	994.63	1,015.02
TUV	Anna Henry	6.40%	562	727.75	728.9	862.54	862.75	
SDLP	Morgan Murphy	2.40%	211	211.15				
Electorate: 15,197 Valid: 8,780 (57.77%) Spoilt: 82 Quota: 1,255 Turnout: 8,862 (58.31%)

== 2019 Election ==
2014: 2 x TUV, 2 x DUP, 1 x UUP, 1 x Sinn Féin

2019: 2 x TUV, 2 x DUP, 1 x UUP, 1 x Sinn Féin

2014-2019 Change: No change

Bannside - 6 seats
Party	Candidate	FPv%	Count							
Party	Candidate	FPv%	1	2	3	4	5	6	7	8
TUV	Stewart McDonald*	18.63%	1,504							
TUV	Timothy Gaston*	17.75%	1,433							
UUP	William McNeilly*	9.70%	783	855.54	916.48	1,285.48				
DUP	Thomas Gordon	9.21%	744	796.52	863.84	895.3	923.14	1,339.14		
DUP	Tommy Nicholl*	8.55%	690	812.72	856.72	901.14	940.5	1,242.5		
Sinn Féin	Ian Friary	12.03%	971	971.52	972.18	972.18	972.18	972.4	972.4	972.4
Alliance	Philip Burnside	9.29%	750	763	773.34	809.52	860.4	883.34	927.34	971.34
DUP	Andrew Wright	9.28%	749	773.7	828.92	843.44	854.44			
UUP	Jackson Minford	5.56%	449	503.08	537.4					
Electorate: 14,393 Valid: 8,073 (56.09%) Spoilt: 96 Quota: 1,154 Turnout: 8,169 (56.76%)

== 2014 Election ==
2011: 2 x DUP, 1 x TUV, 1 x UUP, 1 x Sinn Féin

2014: 2 x DUP, 2 x TUV, 1 x UUP, 1 x Sinn Féin

2011-2014 Change: TUV gain due to the addition of one seat

Bannside - 6 seats
Party	Candidate	FPv%	Count						
Party	Candidate	FPv%	1	2	3	4	5	6	7
TUV	Timothy Gaston*	15.51%	1,212						
Sinn Féin	Patrice Hardy	13.24%	1,035	1,123					
DUP	Tommy Nicholl*	9.94%	777	790	793.52	1,205.52			
DUP	Billy Henry* ‡	7.69%	601	614	618.08	690.52	758.14	758.4	1,270.4
TUV	Stewart McDonald	12.17%	951	975	1,040.6	1,054.88	1,057.82	1,058.86	1,105.67
UUP	William McNeilly*	11.09%	867	944	947.76	967.08	968.13	971.25	1,056.77
UUP	Andrew Wright	8.55%	668	720	724.56	747.52	750.25	751.81	792.51
DUP	Thomas Gordon	8.61%	673	694	702.16	740.64	751.77	751.77	
DUP	Phil Moffatt	7.45%	582	593	598.04				
Alliance	Philip Burnside	5.76%	450						
Electorate: 14,039 Valid: 7,816 (55.67%) Spoilt: 105 Quota: 1,117 Turnout: 7,921 (56.42%)

== 2011 Election ==
2005: 3 x DUP, 1 x UUP, 1 x Sinn Féin

2011: 2 x DUP, 1 x TUV, 1 x UUP, 1 x Sinn Féin

2005-2011 Change: TUV gain from DUP

Bannside - 5 seats
Party	Candidate	FPv%	Count				
Party	Candidate	FPv%	1	2	3	4	5
DUP	Tommy Nicholl*	17.65%	1,192				
TUV	Roy Gillespie*	15.27%	1,031	1,034.05	1,040.05	1,428.05	
UUP	William McNeilly*	15.34%	1,036	1,038.65	1,084.7	1,109.85	1,225.85
DUP	Billy Henry	15.04%	1,016	1,046.8	1,056.85	1,075.45	1,155.45
Sinn Féin	Monica Digney*	11.65%	787	787.05	1,036.1	1,039.1	1,040.1
DUP	Philip Moffett	11.67%	788	808.3	814.45	832.9	891.9
TUV	Timothy Gaston	6.88%	465	466.45	470.5		
SDLP	Eugene Reid	6.50%	439	439.35			
Electorate: 11,284 Valid: 6,754 (59.85%) Spoilt: 118 Quota: 1,126 Turnout: 6,872 (60.90%)

== 2005 Election ==
2001: 3 x DUP, 1 x UUP, 1 x SDLP

2005: 3 x DUP, 1 x UUP, 1 x Sinn Féin

2001-2005 Change: Sinn Féin gain from SDLP

Bannside - 5 seats
Party	Candidate	FPv%	Count			
Party	Candidate	FPv%	1	2	3	4
DUP	Roy Gillespie*	22.95%	1,664			
UUP	William McNeilly*	18.93%	1,373			
DUP	Samuel Gaston*	13.49%	978	1,147.02	1,187.2	1,195.71
Sinn Féin	Monica Digney	11.65%	733	733.54	733.68	1,152.07
DUP	Tommy Nicholl*	13.22%	959	1,065.38	1,121.24	1,150.11
DUP	William Wilkinson	12.67%	919	1,079.38	1,105.98	1,108.8
SDLP	Seamus Laverty*	8.63%	626	628.7	660.2	
Electorate: 10,772 Valid: 7,252 (67.32%) Spoilt: 92 Quota: 1,209 Turnout: 7,344 (68.18%)

== 2001 Election ==
1997: 3 x DUP, 2 x UUP

2001: 3 x DUP, 1 x UUP, 1 x SDLP

1997-2001 Change: SDLP gain from UUP

Bannside - 5 seats
Party	Candidate	FPv%	Count					
Party	Candidate	FPv%	1	2	3	4	5	6
DUP	Roy Gillespie*	19.13%	1,427					
SDLP	Seamus Laverty	12.57%	938	938.65	941.65	1,276.65		
UUP	William McNeilly	14.21%	1,060	1,068.58	1,111.97	1,112.97	1,806.97	
DUP	Tommy Nicholl*	12.90%	962	993.72	1,052.93	1,055.06	1,075.97	1,247.97
DUP	Samuel Gaston	11.93%	890	934.46	976.24	976.24	989.45	1,121.45
DUP	William Wilkinson	11.29%	842	926.76	971.19	972.19	981.1	1,057.1
UUP	Samuel McLean	9.75%	727	733.11	763.5	765.63		
SDLP	Joseph Montgomery	5.03%	375	375.39	375.39			
NI Unionist	Norman Sloan	2.49%	186	190.16				
PUP	Kenneth McCaughey	0.71%	53	54.3				
Electorate: 10,493 Valid: 7,460 (71.10%) Spoilt: 152 Quota: 1,244 Turnout: 7,612 (72.54%)

== 1997 Election ==
1993: 3 x DUP, 2 x UUP

1997: 3 x DUP, 2 x UUP

1993-1997 Change: No change

Bannside - 5 seats
Party	Candidate	FPv%	Count				
Party	Candidate	FPv%	1	2	3	4	5
DUP	Roy Gillespie*	18.75%	1,110				
DUP	Tommy Nicholl*	17.70%	1,048				
UUP	Robert Coulter*	17.13%	1,014				
DUP	Sandy Spence*	14.27%	845	949.28	1,004.6		
UUP	Ian Johnston*	15.81%	936	948.43	953.71	972.89	987.89
SDLP	Seamus Laverty	16.33%	967	967.33	967.39	967.55	967.67
Electorate: 9,931 Valid: 5,920 (59.61%) Spoilt: 115 Quota: 987 Turnout: 6,035 (60.77%)

== 1993 Election ==
1993: 3 x DUP, 2 x UUP

Bannside - 5 seats
Party	Candidate	FPv%	Count			
Party	Candidate	FPv%	1	2	3	4
UUP	Robert Coulter*	21.69%	1,239			
UUP	Ian Johnston*	15.82%	904	1,136.3		
DUP	Roy Gillespie*	11.61%	663	677.49	691.75	999.75
DUP	Tommy Nicholl*	13.85%	791	799.28	823.89	985.89
DUP	Sandy Spence*	11.59%	662	678.56	749.4	905.35
SDLP	Seamus Laverty	14.04%	802	802.46	812.12	814.35
DUP	Hubert Nicholl*	11.41%	652	658.67	677.3	
Electorate: 9,229 Valid: 5,713 (61.90%) Spoilt: 102 Quota: 953 Turnout: 5,815 (63.01%)
