= William Wright (businessman) =

Northern Irish businessman and politician (1925–2022)

Sir William Wright CBE

Member of Ballymena Borough Council
- In office 19 May 1993 – 5 May 2005
- Preceded by: District created
- Succeeded by: John Carson
- Constituency: Ballymena North
- In office 20 May 1981 – 15 May 1985
- Preceded by: Thomas Smyth
- Succeeded by: District abolished
- Constituency: Ballymena Area B

Member of the Constitutional Convention for North Antrim
- In office 1975–1976
- Preceded by: Convention established
- Succeeded by: Convention dissolved

Personal details
- Born: William Thompson Wright; 18 September 1927 Ballymena, Northern Ireland
- Died: 24 July 2022 (aged 94) Ballymena, Northern Ireland
- Party: Independent Unionist (1998 - 2005); Ulster Unionist (1978 - 1998)
- Other political affiliations: Ulster Vanguard (1970s - 1978)

Sir William Thompson Wright, CBE (18 September 1927 – 24 July 2022) was a Northern Irish business owner and Unionist politician.

== Early life ==
William Thompson Wright was born on 18 September 1927 in Ballymena, Northern Ireland, where he also grew up. He first came to prominence in the late 1950s, when he joined his father's company, the vehicle body building business Robert Wright & Son.

== Politics ==
In the 1970s, Wright joined the Vanguard Unionist Progressive Party and was elected as its Chairman. He stood for the party in North Antrim at the Northern Ireland Constitutional Convention election in 1975, and was elected. He later followed the party leaders in joining the Ulster Unionist Party (UUP), and was elected to Ballymena Borough Council for this new party at the 1981 Northern Ireland local elections. He lost his seat at the 1985 election, and did not stand in 1989, but was re-elected in 1993 and won again in 1997.

Wright stood for election to the Northern Ireland Forum in 1996, but was not elected. In 1998, he resigned from the UUP, and stood unsuccessfully in the 1998 Northern Ireland Assembly election as an independent Unionist. He held his council seat in 2001, before finally standing down in 2005.

== Business ==
Outside politics, Wright took over the family business, moving it into the construction of buses, a process which saw it become the Wright Group, with Wrightbus as its best-known subsidiary.

== Death ==
Wright died at his home in Gracehill, Ballymena, in the early hours of 24 July 2022, aged 94.

== Honours ==
Wright was appointed an Officer of the Order of the British Empire (OBE) in the 2001 Birthday Honours for services to Industry and the community. He was promoted to Commander of this Order (CBE) in the 2011 Birthday Honours for services to the Bus Industry. Wright was then knighted in the 2018 New Year Honours for services to the economy and the bus industry. He was awarded the Freedom of the Borough of Mid and East Antrim in Northern Ireland on 18 January 2019.

Northern Ireland Constitutional Convention
New convention	Member for North Antrim; 1975–1976	Convention dissolved
