= Declan O'Loan =

N. Ireland politician

Member of Mid and East Antrim Borough Council
- In office 22 May 2014 – 2 May 2019
- Preceded by: Council created
- Succeeded by: Eugene Reid
- Constituency: Ballymena

Member of Ballymena Borough Council
- In office 19 May 1993 – 22 May 2014
- Preceded by: District created
- Succeeded by: Council abolished
- Constituency: Ballymena South

Member of the Northern Ireland Assembly for Antrim North
- In office 7 March 2007 – 5 May 2011
- Preceded by: Sean Farren
- Succeeded by: Jim Allister

Personal details
- Born: 5 August 1951 (age 75) Carnlough, Northern Ireland, UK
- Party: SDLP
- Spouse: Nuala O'Loan
- Children: 5
- Education: Fitzwilliam College, Cambridge; Imperial College London

Declan O'Loan (born 5 August 1951) is a former Northern Irish Social Democratic and Labour Party (SDLP) politician who served as a Member of the Northern Ireland Assembly (MLA) for North Antrim from 2007 to 2011. O’Loan was also a Member of Ballymena Borough Council from 1993 to 2014. Following comments about merging with Sinn Féin, he had the SDLP whip suspended, sitting as an Independent in 2010. He would later serve as a Mid and East Antrim Councillor for the Ballymena DEA from 2014 to 2019

== Career ==
O'Loan first stood as an SDLP candidate in Ballymena Borough Council, in the Ballymena District in the 1989 local elections, but was unsuccessful. He was elected to the Council at the 1993 local elections for the Ballymena South District.

He was the running mate to the incumbent SDLP MLA, Sean Farren, at the 2003 Northern Ireland Assembly election, but was not elected, polling 2,361 first preference votes.

O'Loan was later elected to the Northern Ireland Assembly in the 2007 election, succeeding Farren. In May 2010, He was suspended by the SDLP after advocating a merger between the SDLP and Sinn Féin to form a single nationalist party. The SDLP had refused to make an electoral pact with Sinn Féin in the 2010 Westminster election.

In the May 2011 election, O'Loan ran as an SDLP candidate for re-election to the Assembly from North Antrim, but was eliminated in the last round of ballot-counting. He was, however, re-elected onto Ballymena Borough Council in the local elections held the same day.

O'Loan was later elected onto the newly created Mid and East Antrim Borough Council in the 2014 local elections for the Ballymena District. He retired at the 2019 local elections.

== Personal life ==
Declan O'Loan is married to Nuala O'Loan, a former Police Ombudsman for Northern Ireland. He is also the Honorary Consul of Romania in Northern Ireland. O'Loan studied at Imperial College London and Fitzwilliam College, Cambridge.

== Organisational membership ==
- Secretary of the Association of SDLP Councillors
- Chair of Ballymena District Policing Partnership
- Chair of Ballymena Community Safety Partnership
- Member of the Board of Ballymena Citizens Advice Bureau
- Member of the Board of Ballymena Community Forum
- Member of the Ballymena Local Strategy Partnership
- Member of the Northern Ireland Community Relations Council

Northern Ireland Assembly
| Preceded by Sean Farren | MLA for Antrim North; 2007–2011 | Succeeded by Jim Allister |
