= 2014 Mid and East Antrim District Council election =

2014 Northern Irish local government election

2014 Mid and East Antrim Council election
22 May 2014	2019 →

All 40 council seats 21 seats needed for a majority
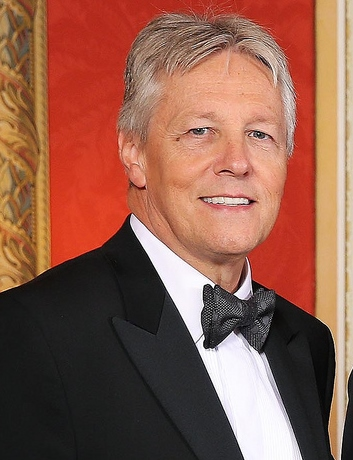

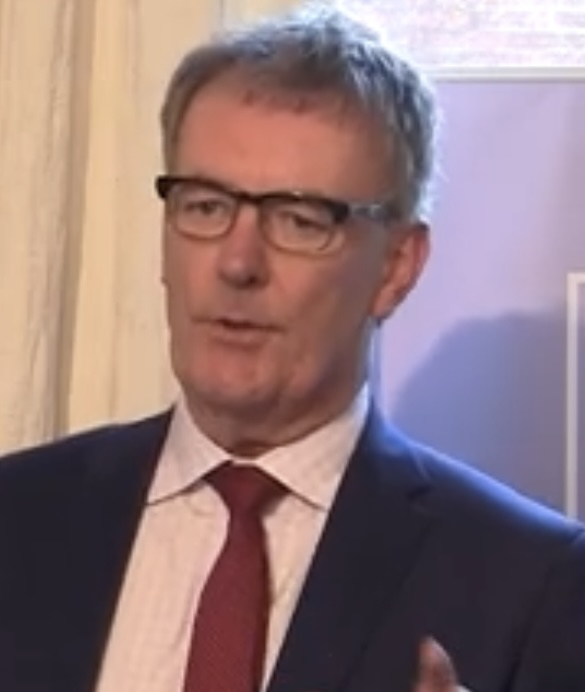

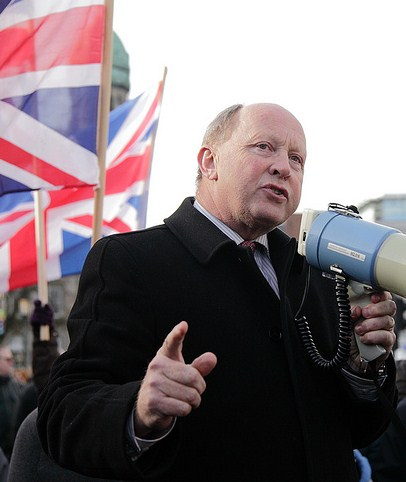

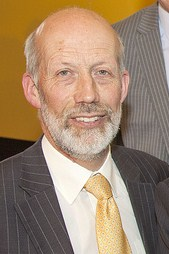

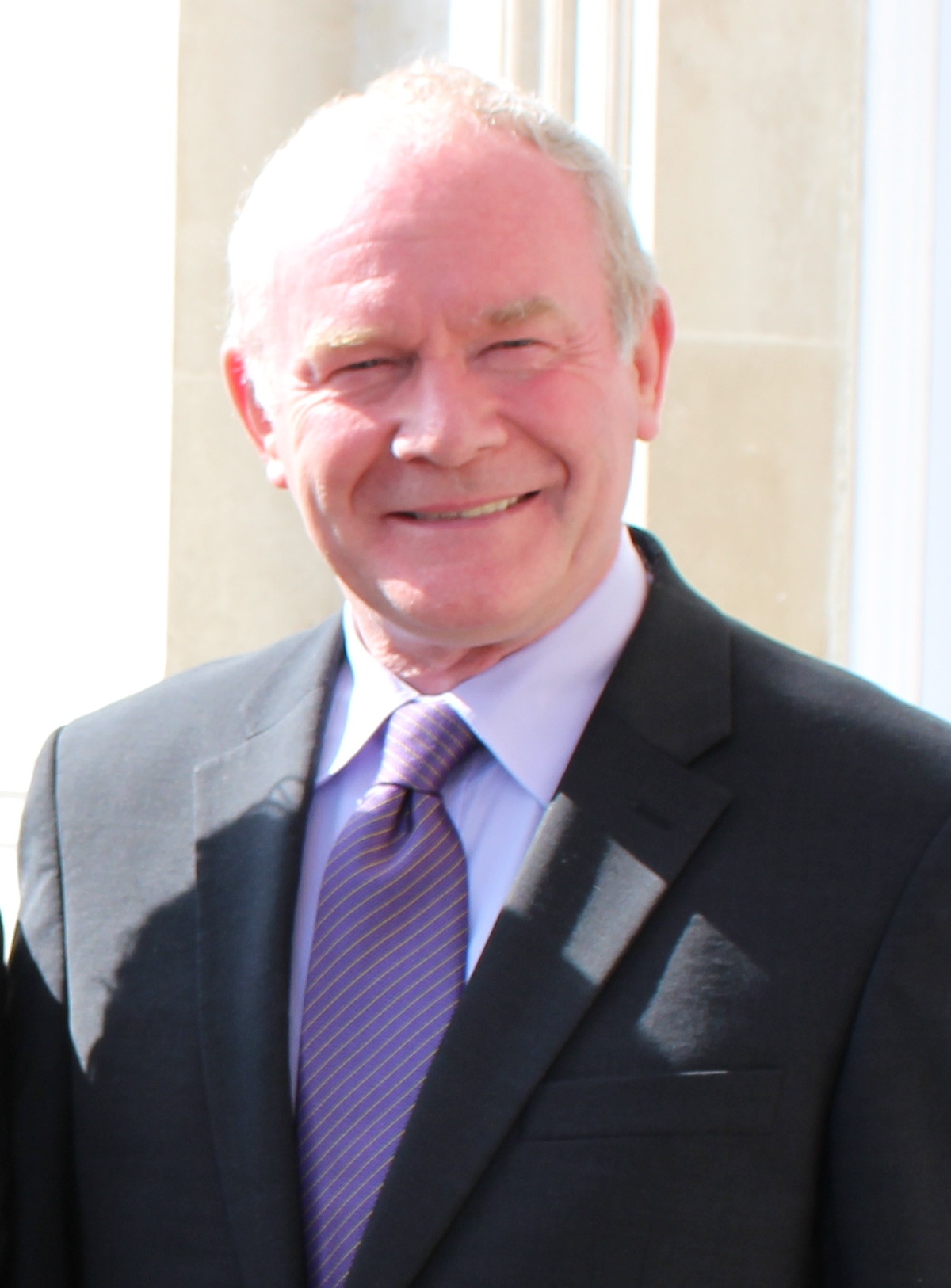

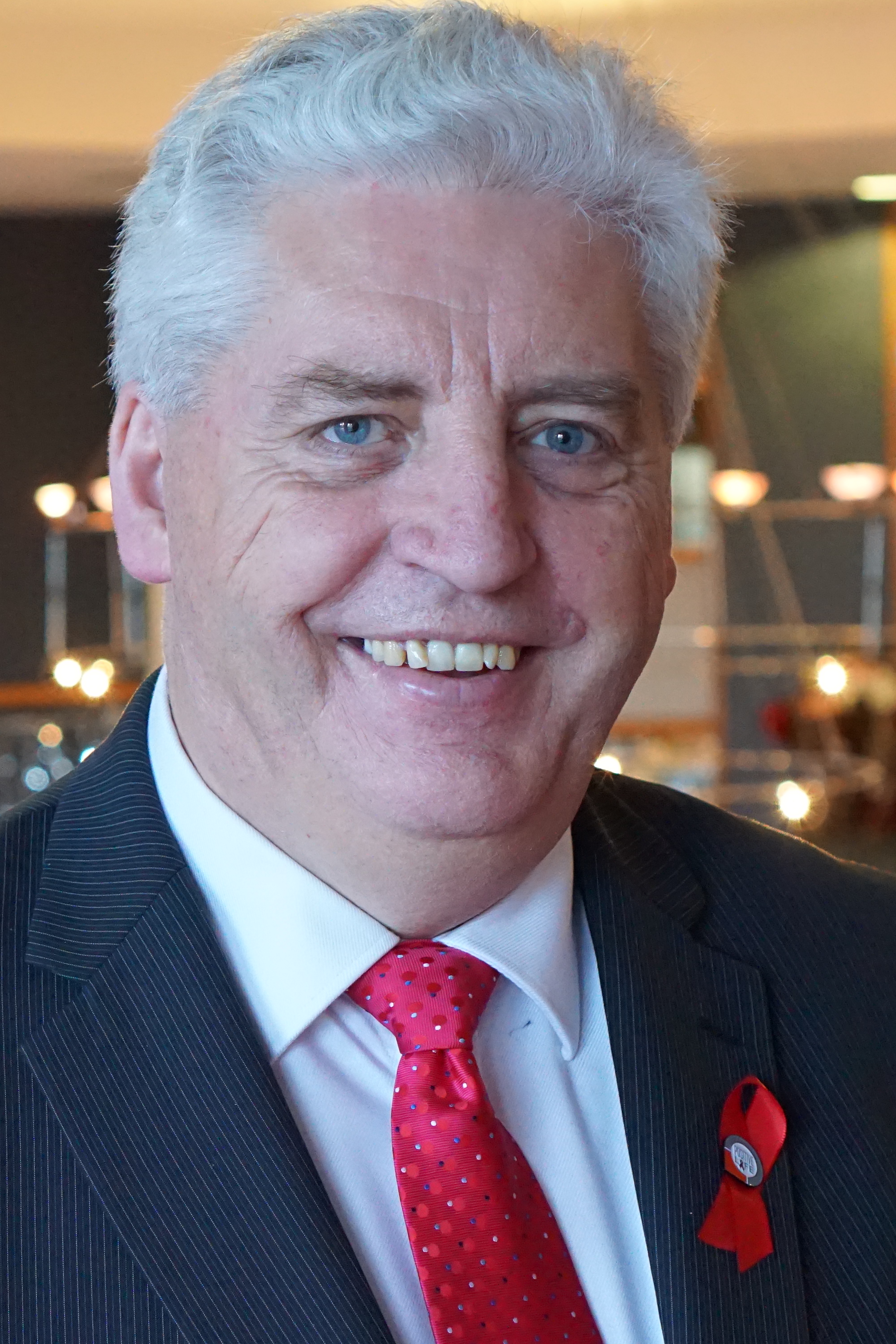

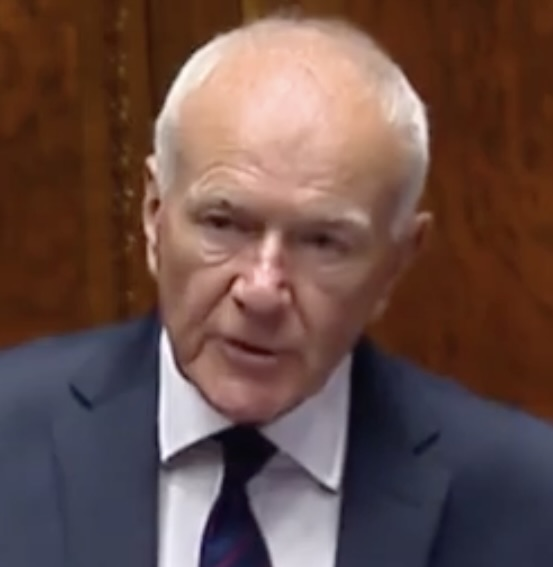
	First party	Second party	Third party
Leader	Peter Robinson	Mike Nesbitt	Jim Allister
Party	DUP	UUP	TUV
Seats won	16	9	5
Seat change	New council	New council	New council
	Fourth party	Fifth party	Sixth party
Leader	David Ford	Martin McGuinness	Alasdair McDonnell
Party	Alliance	Sinn Féin	SDLP
Seats won	3	3	1
Seat change	New council	New council	New council
	Seventh party	Eighth party
Leader	David McNarry
Party	UKIP	Independent
Seats won	1	2
Seat change	New council	New council
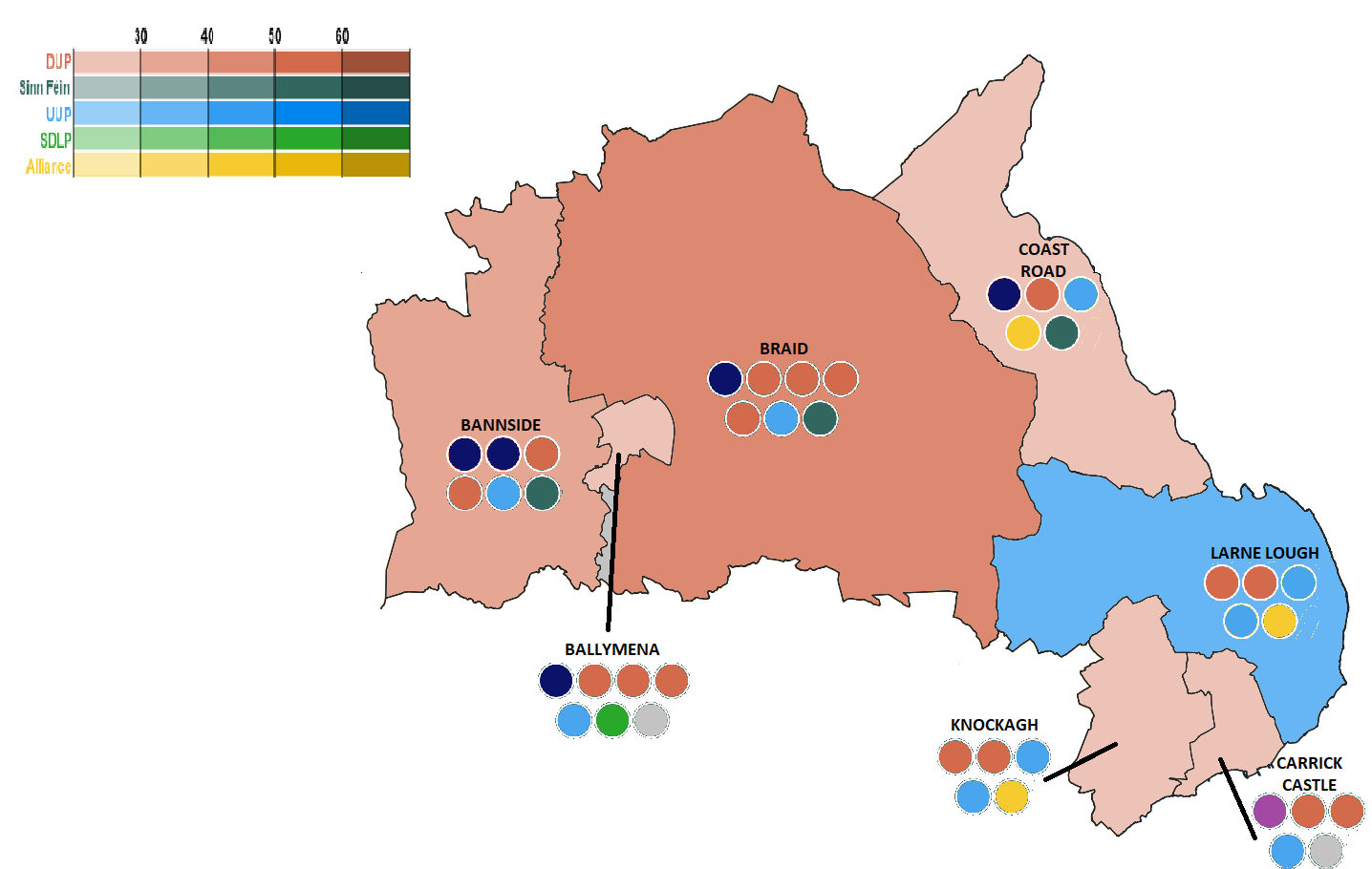
- Mid and East Antrim 2014 Council Election Results by DEA (Shaded by plurality of FPVs)

The first election to Mid and East Antrim District Council, part of the Northern Ireland local elections on 22 May 2014, returned 40 members to the newly formed council via Single Transferable Vote. The Democratic Unionist Party were the largest party in both first-preference votes and seats.

== Election results ==
Party	Seats	±	First Preference Votes	FPV%	±%
DUP	16		15,093	33.01	
UUP	9		8,577	18.76	
TUV	5		6,704	14.66	
Alliance	3		4,277	9.36	
Sinn Féin	3		3,118	6.82	
Independent	2		2,761	6.04	
SDLP	1		2,023	4.43	
UKIP	1		749	1.64	
PUP	0		1,352	2.96	
NI21	0		783	1.71	
BNP	0		173	0.38	
NI Conservatives	0		107	0.23	
Totals	40		45,718	100.00	—

== Districts summary ==
Results of the Mid and East Antrim District Council election, 2014 by district
Ward	%	Cllrs	%	Cllrs	%	Cllrs	%	Cllrs	%	Cllrs	%	Cllrs	%	Cllrs	%	Cllrs	Total Cllrs
Ward	DUP		UUP		TUV		Alliance		Sinn Féin		SDLP		UKIP		Others		Total Cllrs
Ballymena	29.5	3	5.8	1	17.0	1	4.7	0	7.3	0	14.1	1	0.0	0	21.6	1	7
Bannside	33.7	2	19.6	1	27.7	2	5.8	0	13.2	1	0.0	0	0.0	0	0.0	0	6
Braid	46.0	4	17.2	1	17.1	1	3.4	0	8.2	1	5.9	0	0.0	0	2.2	0	7
Carrick Castle	27.2	2	16.1	1	5.8	0	14.5	0	0.0	0	0.0	0	12.9	1	23.5	1	5
Coast Road	21.2	1	17.5	1	10.7	1	10.9	1	14.0	1	7.7	0	0.0	0	18.0	0	5
Knockagh	35.7	2	26.6	2	9.9	0	15.9	1	0.0	0	0.0	0	0.0	0	11.9	0	5
Larne Lough	30.4	2	31.0	2	10.7	0	15.6	1	2.3	0	0.0	0	0.0	0	10.0	0	5
Total	33.0	16	18.8	9	15.0	5	9.4	3	6.8	3	4.1	1	1.6	2	11.3	2	40

== District results ==
=== Ballymena ===
2014: 3 x DUP, 1 x TUV, 1 x SDLP, 1 x UUP, 1 x Independent

Ballymena - 7 seats
Party	Candidate	FPv%	Count										
Party	Candidate	FPv%	1	2	3	4	5	6	7	8	9	10	11
Independent	James Henry*	15.85%	1,042										
SDLP	Declan O'Loan*	9.66%	635	649.08	655.52	672.06	906.06						
DUP	Audrey Wales*	9.10%	598	632.76	657.84	682.6	684.6	685.05	883.05				
TUV	Donna Anderson ‡	11.22%	738	754.72	798.14	804.14	804.14	804.14	813.24	813.86	1,117.86		
DUP	John Carson*	8.85%	582	598.5	625.48	633.14	633.14	633.59	683.89	730.39	761.35	859.35	
UUP	Stephen Nicholl	5.79%	381	418.18	434.94	477.02	480.46	480.91	497.33	497.95	534.67	616.67	728.92
DUP	Reuben Glover	6.49%	427	439.76	461.52	470.4	470.4	470.85	531.81	543.59	564.79	627.79	647.45
Sinn Féin	Marian Maguire	7.25%	477	479.42	479.42	484.42	516.3	548.25	548.25	548.25	548.25	548.25	605.45
Alliance	Jayne Dunlop*	4.71%	310	328.48	333.9	410.18	422.72	471.77	473.21	473.21	478.43	482.43	
TUV	Matthew Armstrong	5.73%	377	388.89	400.2	404.86	404.86	404.86	412.74	413.05			
DUP	David McCartney	5.05%	332	346.08	355.74	362.18	362.18	362.18					
SDLP	Eugene Reid	4.40%	289	292.52	293.52	296.52							
NI21	Richard Marshall	3.21%	211	225.74	236.28								
Independent	Rodney Quigley	2.68%	176	197.34									
Electorate: 15,691 Valid: 6,575 (41.90%) Spoilt: 94 Quota: 822 Turnout: 6,669 (42.50%)

=== Bannside ===
2014: 2 x DUP, 2 x TUV, 1 x UUP, 1 x Sinn Féin

Bannside - 6 seats
Party	Candidate	FPv%	Count						
Party	Candidate	FPv%	1	2	3	4	5	6	7
TUV	Timothy Gaston*	15.51%	1,212						
Sinn Féin	Patrice Hardy	13.24%	1,035	1,123					
DUP	Tommy Nicholl*	9.94%	777	790	793.52	1,205.52			
DUP	Billy Henry* ‡	7.69%	601	614	618.08	690.52	758.14	758.4	1,270.4
TUV	Stewart McDonald	12.17%	951	975	1,040.6	1,054.88	1,057.82	1,058.86	1,105.67
UUP	William McNeilly*	11.09%	867	944	947.76	967.08	968.13	971.25	1,056.77
UUP	Andrew Wright	8.55%	668	720	724.56	747.52	750.25	751.81	792.51
DUP	Thomas Gordon	8.61%	673	694	702.16	740.64	751.77	751.77	
DUP	Phil Moffatt	7.45%	582	593	598.04				
Alliance	Philip Burnside	5.76%	450						
Electorate: 14,039 Valid: 7,816 (55.67%) Spoilt: 105 Quota: 1,117 Turnout: 7,921 (56.42%)

=== Braid ===
2014: 4 x DUP, 1 x UUP, 1 x TUV, 1 x Sinn Féin

Braid - 7 seats
Party	Candidate	FPv%	Count								
Party	Candidate	FPv%	1	2	3	4	5	6	7	8	9
DUP	Beth Clyde*	9.81%	865	890	1,210						
DUP	William McCaughey*	10.57%	932	955	1,038	1,112.46					
TUV	Brian Collins	10.35%	912	939	945	945.34	954.34	1,416.34			
UUP	Robin Cherry*	10.90%	961	1,009	1,027	1,028.36	1,057.36	1,090.36	1,160.92		
DUP	Beth Adger*	10.11%	891	934	990	1,011.76	1,021.76	1,058.1	1,153.02		
Sinn Féin	Paul Maguire* ‡	8.19%	722	736	737	737	1,044	1,045	1,045	1,045	1,045
DUP	Samuel Hanna*	9.08%	800	808	845	851.8	863.14	881.14	923.14	935.74	978.49
UUP	Brian Thompson	6.34%	559	618	666	668.04	692.04	745.04	848.35	889.52	897.5
TUV	Roy McPeake	6.77%	597	632	645	645.34	649.34				
SDLP	Catherine O'Hara	5.95%	524	606	608	608.68					
DUP	Chris Wales	6.46%	569	590							
Alliance	Danny Donnelly	3.39%	299								
PUP	William Parkhill	2.08%	183								
Electorate: 16,543 Valid: 8,814 (53.28%) Spoilt: 88 Quota: 1,102 Turnout: 8,902 (53.81%)

=== Carrick Castle ===
2014: 2 x DUP, 1 x UUP, 1 x UKIP, 1 x Independent

Carrick Castle - 5 seats
Party	Candidate	FPv%	Count									
Party	Candidate	FPv%	1	2	3	4	5	6	7	8	9	10
UUP	John Stewart †	16.12%	939	967	1,010							
Independent	James Brown* ♭	15.14%	882	919	936	937.9	959.9	997.9				
UKIP	Noel Jordan	12.86%	749	783	857	867.45	875.45	984.45				
DUP	Billy Ashe*	12.86%	749	769	791	794.8	800.8	876.65	1,052.65			
DUP	Cheryl Johnston	7.54%	439	460	494	501.6	506.6	564.4	793.35	872.81	880.81	892.69
Alliance	Gavin Norris*	8.65%	504	523	526	527.9	536.9	852.9	867.75	868.91	872.91	874.26
DUP	Fred Cobain*	6.83%	398	405	416	418.85	419.85	463.8				
TUV	William Knox	5.80%	338	347	385	395.45	399.45					
Alliance	Elena Aceves-Cully	5.87%	342	362	363	363						
PUP	Jonathan Cooke	4.26%	248	261								
Independent	Nick Wady	2.25%	131									
Independent	John Cameron	1.80%	105									
Electorate: 12,878 Valid: 5,824 (45.22%) Spoilt: 69 Quota: 971 Turnout: 5,893 (45.76%)

=== Coast Road ===
2014: 1 x DUP, 1 x UUP, 1 x Sinn Féin, 1 x Alliance, 1 x TUV

Coast Road - 5 seats
Party	Candidate	FPv%	Count									
Party	Candidate	FPv%	1	2	3	4	5	6	7	8	9	10
UUP	Maureen Morrow*	17.56%	946									
Sinn Féin	James McKeown*	14.04%	756	756.1	756.1	761.15	785.2	930.2				
Alliance	Geraldine Mulvenna*	10.95%	590	598.35	600.4	635.7	701.95	910.95				
DUP	Gordon Lyons†	12.25%	660	669.85	677	692.1	722.55	730.7	732.7	736.38	1,133.38	
TUV	Ruth Wilson	10.68%	575	583.7	591.7	613.95	652.3	659.5	660.5	663.26	718.11	873.72
PUP	Jonathan Hodge	8.61%	464	466.25	473.3	477.4	523.7	536.8	553.8	558.4	610.06	688.32
DUP	Drew Niblock*	8.99%	484	494.3	499.3	504.45	536.7	544.8	550.8	552.64		
SDLP	Martin Wilson*	7.72%	416	417.1	417.1	425.15	486.4					
Independent	Danny O'Connor	3.49%	188	188.85	188.85	207						
BNP	Robert Bell	1.88%	101	101.8	140.25	153.3						
Independent	John Anderson	2.47%	133	134.3	134.3							
BNP	Steven Moore	1.34%	72	72.7								
Electorate: 12,427 Valid: 5,386 (43.34%) Spoilt: 58 Quota: 898 Turnout: 5,444 (43.81%)

=== Knockagh ===
2014: 2 x DUP, 2 x UUP, 1 x Alliance

Knockagh - 5 seats
Party	Candidate	FPv%	Count								
Party	Candidate	FPv%	1	2	3	4	5	6	7	8	9
UUP	Andrew Wilson*	16.23%	912	927	939						
DUP	May Beattie*	15.20%	854	858	881	966					
DUP	Lynn McClurg*	6.41%	360	362	371	530	548.02	548.02	604.56	613.56	937.56
Alliance	Paul Sinclair	8.53%	479	492	511	515	515.68	515.68	519.68	876.68	892.02
UUP	Lindsay Millar	10.34%	581	592	622	629	630.7	631.7	725.7	754.7	852
TUV	Ken McFaul	9.91%	557	561	578	588	588.68	588.88	721.56	733.56	789.92
DUP	Robert Stewart	8.49%	477	488	495	530	535.78	536.38	577.38	590.38	
Alliance	Noel Williams*	7.42%	417	429	436	436	436	436	440		
PUP	Gareth Cole	5.36%	301	305	424	434	435.36	436.56			
DUP	Robert Harrison-Rice	5.57%	313	318	323						
PUP	Jim McCaw	2.78%	156	156							
NI Conservatives	Gary Broad	1.90%	107	113							
Independent	Barry Patterson	1.85%	104								
Electorate: 12,090 Valid: 5,618 (46.47%) Spoilt: 65 Quota: 937 Turnout: 5,683 (47.01%)

=== Larne Lough ===
2014: 2 x UUP, 2 x DUP, 1 x Alliance

Larne Lough - 5 seats
Party	Candidate	FPv%	Count						
Party	Candidate	FPv%	1	2	3	4	5	6	7
DUP	Gregg McKeen*	16.99%	966						
UUP	Mark McKinty*	16.31%	927	928	966				
Alliance	Robert Logan	10.23%	583	619	622	903	903.05	1,200.05	
UUP	Andrew Wilson	14.71%	836	836	855	879	881.94	960.94	
DUP	Paul Reid	7.93%	457	457	700	710	715.71	773.71	805.71
TUV	Kenneth Johnston	10.67%	606	606	615	621	621.51	657.53	678.53
NI21	Jeremy Jones	10.06%	572	583	586	611	611.08		
Alliance	Michael Lynch*	5.33%	303	366	372				
DUP	Matthew Scott	5.40%	307	307					
Sinn Féin	Seán Waide	2.25%	128						
Electorate: 12,826 Valid: 5,685 (44.32%) Spoilt: 72 Quota: 948 Turnout: 5,757 (44.89%)

* Incumbent

== Changes during the term ==
=== † Co-options ===
Co-option date	Electoral Area	Party	Outgoing	Co-optee	Reason
13 Nov 2015	Coast Road	DUP	Gordon Lyons	Angela Smyth	Lyons was co-opted to the Northern Ireland Assembly.
4 Apr 2017	Carrick Castle	UUP	John Stewart	Robin Stewart	John was elected to the Assembly.

=== ♭ Carrick Castle by-election, 18 October 2018 ===
After independent unionist councillor Charles (Jim) Brown died in August 2018, the Electoral Office determined that none of his three proposed substitutes met the criteria for co-option. This triggered the first by-election in Northern Ireland since local government reform in 2014. The DUP's Peter Johnston won the seat on the third count.

Carrick Castle by-election (18 October 2018)- 1 Seat
Party	Candidate	FPv%	Count		
Party	Candidate	FPv%	1	2	3
DUP	Peter Keith Johnston	38.82	1,106	1,298	1,362
UUP	John McDermott	23.45	668	823	1,147
Alliance	Lauren Gray	19.52	556	645	
Democrats and Veterans	Si Harvey	15.72	448		
Independent	Will Sibley	2.49	71		
Electorate: 13,181 Valid: 2,849 Spoilt: 24 Quota: 1,425 Turnout: 2,873 (21.8%)

=== ‡ Changes in affiliation ===
Date	Electoral Area	Name	Previous affiliation	New affiliation	Circumstance
24 Sep 2015	Ballymena	Donna Anderson	TUV	UKIP	Moved.
30 Aug 2016	Braid	Paul Maguire	Sinn Féin	Independent	Resigned.
06 Jun 2018	Carrick Castle	Noel Jordan	UKIP	Independent	Resigned.
03 Aug 2018	Ballymena	Donna Anderson	UKIP	Independent	Resigned.
2018-2019	Bannside	Billy Henry	DUP	Independent	
25 March 2019	Knockagh	May Beattie	DUP	TUV	Moved.

Last updated 31 March 2019.

Current composition: see Mid and East Antrim Borough Council.
