= Ballymena Borough Council =

Former local authority of Ballymena, Northern Ireland

Type
- Type: District Council of Ballymena (borough)

Map of the borough's DEAs from 1993 to 2014

Ballymena Borough Council was the local authority of Ballymena in Northern Ireland. It merged with Carrickfergus Borough Council and Larne Borough Council in May 2015 under local government reorganisation in Northern Ireland to become Mid and East Antrim Borough Council.

The borough of Ballymena was created in 1973 from the merging of the former municipal borough of Ballymena with most of the surrounding Ballymena Rural District. The new council inherited the 1937 charter of incorporation of the municipal borough, continuing the borough status and mayoralty.

== Makeup ==
The borough was divided into four electoral areas: Ballymena North, Ballymena South, Bannside, and Braid, from which 24 members were elected. The entire council was elected every four years by proportional representation. The last election was due to take place in May 2009, but on April 25, 2008, Shaun Woodward, Secretary of State for Northern Ireland announced that the scheduled 2009 district council elections were to be postponed until the introduction of the eleven new councils in 2011. The proposed reforms were abandoned in 2010, and the most recent district council elections took place in 2011 In February 2012, the political composition of the council was:

- 12 Democratic Unionist Party (DUP)
- 4 Ulster Unionist Party (UUP)
- 2 Traditional Unionist Voice (TUV)
- 2 Social Democratic and Labour Party (SDLP)
- 2 Sinn Féin
- 1 Alliance
- 1 Independent. The Mayor of Ballymena for 2011-12 was Councillor Hubert Nicholl (DUP).

== Population ==
The area covered by the former Ballymena Borough Council has a population of 64,044 residents according to the 2011 Northern Ireland census.
