= Omagh Area C =

District electoral areas in Omagh, Northern Ireland

Omagh Area C was one of the four district electoral areas in Omagh, Northern Ireland which existed from 1973 to 1985. The district elected seven members to Omagh District Council, and formed part of the Mid Ulster constituencies for the Northern Ireland Assembly and UK Parliament.

It was created for the 1973 local elections, and contained the wards of Dergmoney, Drumragh, East, Fairgreen, Killyclogher, Strule and West. It was abolished for the 1985 local elections and mostly replaced with the Omagh Town DEA, with Killyclogher moving to the Mid Tyrone DEA.

== Councillors ==
Election	Councillor (Party)	Councillor (Party)	Councillor (Party)	Councillor (Party)	Councillor (Party)	Councillor (Party)	Councillor (Party)
1981	Oliver Gibson (DUP)	John Ashenhurst (UUP)	William Thompson (UUP)	Aidan Lagan (Alliance)	Bernadette Grant (SDLP)	Stephen McKenna (SDLP)	Patrick Fahy (IIP)
1977	Cecil Walker (UUP)	Harold McCauley (UUP)	Alfred Barnett (UUP)	Aidan Lagan (Alliance)	Bernadette Grant (SDLP)	Stephen McKenna (SDLP)	Gerald McEnhill (SDLP)
1973	Cecil Walker (UUP)	Harold McCauley (UUP)	Norman Wilson (UUP)	Albert Cooper (Alliance)	Paddy McGill (Nationalist)	Stephen McKenna (SDLP)	Gerald McEnhill (SDLP)

== 1981 Election ==
1977: 3 x SDLP, 3 x UUP, 1 x Alliance

1981: 2 x SDLP, 2 x UUP, 1 x Alliance, 1 x DUP, 1 x IIP

1977-1981 Change: DUP and IIP gain from SDLP and UUP

Omagh Area C - 7 seats
Party	Candidate	FPv%	Count						
Party	Candidate	FPv%	1	2	3	4	5	6	7
Irish Independence	Patrick Fahy	15.77%	1,185						
DUP	Oliver Gibson	13.65%	1,026						
SDLP	Bernadette Grant*	10.88%	818	839.84	840.08	843.08	847.18	849.39	????
Alliance	Aidan Lagan*	9.62%	723	744	744.8	753.8	766.53	769.53	????
UUP	John Ashenhurst	8.70%	654	654	658.16	668.24	668.24	750.2	????
UUP	William Thompson	6.08%	457	457	461.72	468.8	468.8	548.2	????
SDLP	Stephen McKenna*	6.83%	513	526.23	526.39	526.39	536.75	536.75	????
SDLP	Patrick McGowan	6.60%	496	503.98	503.98	504.98	512.87	512.87	????
SDLP	Arthur Breen	6.03%	453	464.13	464.13	464.13	471.39	473.39	????
Alliance	Richard Hinds	4.47%	336	336.42	336.74	337.74	337.74	339.74	????
DUP	William Caldwell	4.45%	251	251.21	281.77	292.25	292.25	305.81	????
Irish Independence	Michael Kelly	1.05%	79	179.38	179.38	181.38	273.99	273.99	????
DUP	James Mitchell	2.30%	173	173	209.8	224.2	224.2	238.92	????
UUP	Alfred Barnett*	2.58%	194	194.21	196.93	203.93	203.93		
Irish Independence	Francis Loughran	1.10%	83	146.21	146.21	147.21			
Ind. Unionist	Edward Sayers	0.98%	74	74	75.04				
Electorate: 10,778 Valid: 7,515 (69.73%) Spoilt: 166 Quota: 940 Turnout: 7,681 (71.27%)

- Data missing from stage 7 onwards

== 1977 Election ==
1973: 3 x UUP, 2 x SDLP, 1 x Alliance, 1 x Nationalist

1977: 3 x UUP, 3 x SDLP, 1 x Alliance

1973-1977 Change: SDLP gain from Nationalist

Omagh Area C - 7 seats
Party	Candidate	FPv%	Count							
Party	Candidate	FPv%	1	2	3	4	5	6	7	8
Alliance	Aidan Lagan	16.51%	1,012							
SDLP	Gerald McEnhill*	15.17%	930							
UUP	Cecil Walker*	14.37%	881							
SDLP	Stephen McKenna*	11.45%	702	746.25	849.78					
UUP	Alfred Barnett	8.79%	539	539.25	539.42	568.02	568.02	787.02		
UUP	Harold McCauley*	7.37%	452	457.75	458.26	509.09	509.37	685.63	703	857
SDLP	Bernadette Grant	8.73%	535	555	578.97	579.23	618.57	620.95	620.95	726.31
SDLP	Daniel Campbell	6.43%	394	412	434.44	434.44	470.84	475.22	475.31	539.32
Alliance	Ethne McClelland	4.76%	292	443	447.25	449.59	454.21	467.66	468.29	
UUP	Archibald Burton	6.41%	393	394.25	394.25	424.93	425.07			
Electorate: 10,073 Valid: 6,130 (60.86%) Spoilt: 277 Quota: 767 Turnout: 6,407 (63.61%)

== 1973 Election ==
1973: 3 x UUP, 2 x SDLP, 1 x Nationalist, 1 x Alliance

Omagh Area C - 7 seats
Party	Candidate	FPv%	Count																		
Party	Candidate	FPv%	1	2	3	4	5	6	7	8	9	10	11	12	13	14	15	16	17	18	19
UUP	Cecil Walker	14.51%	901																		
SDLP	Stephen McKenna	11.55%	717	717	736	743	751	767	797												
UUP	Norman Wilson	9.70%	602	651.14	651.14	651.14	651.14	652.14	653.14	653.14	653.21	655.4	680.18	681.18	756.9	769.16	770.16	792.16			
Alliance	Albert Cooper	3.67%	228	228.52	228.52	229.52	230.52	230.52	236.52	236.52	261.52	310.52	310.65	323.65	334.78	431.46	468.14	783.14			
Nationalist	Paddy McGill	5.67%	352	352	354	371	409	444	478	486.84	494.84	505.84	505.84	529.52	529.52	534.52	598.2	605.2	958.2		
SDLP	Gerald McEnhill	6.44%	400	400	410	410	417	425	436	439.4	445.4	455.4	455.4	520.08	521.08	533.08	752.44	767.44	834.44		
UUP	Harold McCauley	5.70%	354	385.07	385.07	385.07	385.07	385.07	386.07	386.07	389.07	393.33	408.41	408.41	548.47	555.73	559.73	592.9	596.9	617.9	619.9
United Loyalist Coalition	Edward Sayers	5.07%	315	325.53	326.66	326.66	326.66	326.66	328.66	328.66	330.66	332.66	475.65	475.65	490.21	493.47	493.47	518.99	522.99	540.99	540.99
Nationalist	Roderick O'Connor	5.17%	321	321	321	343	361	388	413	413	420	430	430	452	452	460	481.36	488.36			
Alliance	Victor Leitch	3.64%	226	227.3	227.3	227.3	228.3	230.3	231.3	231.3	251.3	294.56	296.95	299.95	313.08	439.21	450.21				
SDLP	Peter Bradley	4.12%	256	256	260	260	265	267	279	281.04	284.72	286.72	286.72	378.76	378.76	383.76					
Alliance	Ethne McClelland	2.98%	185	185.52	186.52	187.52	187.52	187.52	187.52	187.52	229.2	274.2	274.46	276.46	279.59						
UUP	James Charleton	3.74%	232	246.82	246.82	246.82	246.82	246.82	246.82	246.82	247.82	248.82	257.86	259.86							
SDLP	Liam Brogan	3.13%	194	194	197	197	205	211	222	226.08	230.08	232.08	232.08								
United Loyalist Coalition	Ernest Marshall	3.09%	192	200.19	200.19	200.19	200.19	200.19	200.19	200.19	200.19	200.19									
Alliance	James Cunningham	2.43%	151	151.65	151.65	152.65	153.65	158.65	161.65	161.65	188.65										
Alliance	Enda McShane	2.30%	143	143.13	144.13	148.13	149.13	152.13	152.13	153.49											
Ind. Nationalist	Michael Cunningham	2.17%	135	135	136	138	138	151													
Nationalist	Jackie Martin	1.69%	105	105	105	108	118														
Nationalist	Paddy Doherty	1.42%	88	88	89	99															
Nationalist	Felix McRory	1.10%	68	68	68																
SDLP	Henry Graham	0.69%	43	43.13																	
Electorate: 8,980 Valid: 6,208 (69.13%) Spoilt: 73 Quota: 777 Turnout: 6,281 (69.94%)
