= Patrick McGill =

Patrick McGill may refer to:

- Paddy McGill (1913–1977), Nationalist politician in Northern Ireland
- Paddy McGill (hurler) (born 1988), Irish hurler
- Patrick MacGill (1889–1963), Irish writer, known as the "navvy poet"
- Pat McGill, wrestler with Stampede Wrestling
- Pat McGill (Gaelic footballer), who played for Naomh Adhamhnáin and Donegal
