= 1981 Omagh District Council election =

Local govt election in Northern Ireland

← 1977	20 May 1981	1985 →

All 20 seats to Omagh District Council 11 seats needed for a majority
	First party	Second party	Third party
Party	SDLP	Irish Independence	UUP
Seats won	5	5	4
Seat change	▼1	▲5	▼4
	Fourth party	Fifth party	Sixth party
Party	DUP	Alliance	Ind. Nationalist
Seats won	4	2	0
Seat change	▲4	▼1	▼2
	Seventh party
Party	Republican Clubs
Seats won	0
Seat change	▼1

Elections to Omagh District Council were held on 20 May 1981 on the same day as the other Northern Irish local government elections. The election used four district electoral areas to elect a total of 20 councillors.

== Election results ==
Omagh District Council Election Result 1981
Party	Seats	Gains	Losses	Net gain/loss	Seats %	Votes %	Votes	+/−
SDLP	5	0	1	▼1	25.0	25.0	5,413	▼4.6
Irish Independence	5	5	0	▲5	25.0	22.2	4,809	New
UUP	4	0	4	▼4	20.0	19.5	4,216	▼16.4
DUP	4	0	0	0	20.0	16.6	3,596	New
Alliance	2	0	1	▼1	10.0	9.0	1,951	▼7.0
Independent	0	0	0	0	0.0	2.8	604	▲2.8
Republican Clubs	0	0	1	▼1	0.0	1.9	407	▲2.3
Ind. Republican	0	0	0	0	0.0	1.7	375	▲1.7
Ind. Unionist	0	0	0	0	0.0	1.2	270	▲1.2

Note: "Votes" are the first preference votes.

== Districts summary ==
Results of the Omagh District Council election, 1981 by district
Ward	%	Cllrs	%	Cllrs	%	Cllrs	%	Cllrs	%	Cllrs	%	Cllrs	Total Cllrs
Ward	SDLP		IIP		UUP		DUP		Alliance		Others		Total Cllrs
Area A	32.2	2	23.3	1	24.5	1	14.8	1	1.6	0	3.6	0	5
Area B	8.7	0	13.8	1	25.4	1	17.0	1	12.6	1	22.5	0	4
Area C	30.3	2	17.9	1	17.4	2	19.3	1	14.1	1	1.0	0	7
Area D	23.6	1	37.7	2	10.2	0	13.8	1	5.6	0	9.1	0	4
Total	25.0	5	22.2	5	19.5	4	16.6	4	9.0	2	7.7	0	20

== Districts results ==
=== Area A ===
1977: 2 x SDLP, 2 x UUP, 1 x Independent Nationalist
1981: 2 x SDLP, 1 x UUP, 1 x IIP, 1 x DUP
1977-1981 Change: IIP and DUP gain from UUP and Independent Nationalist

Omagh Area A - 5 seats
Party	Candidate	FPv%	Count						
Party	Candidate	FPv%	1	2	3	4	5	6	7
UUP	Arthur McFarland*	15.54%	846	935					
SDLP	Liam McQuaid*	15.43%	840	858	859	1,148			
Irish Independence	Charles McElholm	14.16%	771	778	780	788	799.05	1,151.05	
SDLP	John Skelton*	9.88%	538	550	550	625	841.75	943.75	
DUP	Ivan Foster	8.71%	474	518	800	800	800	807	810
UUP	William Montgomery	9.00%	490	538	577	577	577	577	580
Irish Independence	John Fahy	9.11%	496	510	512	520	530.2		
SDLP	Vincent O'Brien	6.91%	376	391	392				
DUP	George Thompson	6.06%	330	345					
Ind. Unionist	Cecil Anderson*	3.60%	196						
Alliance	Dermot McCormick	1.60%	87						
Electorate: 6,459 Valid: 5,444 (84.29%) Spoilt: 166 Quota: 908 Turnout: 5,610 (86.86%)

=== Area B ===
1977: 2 x UUP, 1 x Alliance, 1 x Independent Nationalist
1981: 1 x UUP, 1 x Alliance, 1 x DUP, 1 x IIP
1977-1981 Change: DUP gain from UUP, Independent Nationalist joins IIP

Omagh Area B - 4 seats
Party	Candidate	FPv%	Count						
Party	Candidate	FPv%	1	2	3	4	5	6	7
Irish Independence	Patrick Donnelly*	13.81%	623	623	715	1,014			
UUP	Robert Moses	13.23%	597	616	618	619	619	1,101	
DUP	James McConnell	11.35%	512	709	710	710	710	802.5	966.02
Alliance	Patrick Bogan*	12.64%	570	570	674	768	825	833	866.6
Independent	John Mullin	13.39%	604	605	643	742	793.75	794.75	794.75
UUP	John Hutchinson	12.21%	551	586	587	587	588.5		
Republican Clubs	Tommy Owens	9.02%	407	407	539				
SDLP	Eugene Donnelly	8.71%	393	394					
DUP	William McFarland	5.63%	254						
Electorate: 5,332 Valid: 4,511 (84.60%) Spoilt: 120 Quota: 903 Turnout: 4,631 (86.85%)

=== Area C ===
1977: 3 x SDLP, 3 x UUP, 1 x Alliance
1981: 2 x SDLP, 2 x UUP, 1 x Alliance, 1 x DUP, 1 x IIP
1977-1981 Change: DUP and IIP gain from SDLP and UUP

Omagh Area C - 7 seats
Party	Candidate	FPv%	Count						
Party	Candidate	FPv%	1	2	3	4	5	6	7
Irish Independence	Patrick Fahy	15.77%	1,185						
DUP	Oliver Gibson	13.65%	1,026						
SDLP	Bernadette Grant*	10.88%	818	839.84	840.08	843.08	847.18	849.39	????
Alliance	Aidan Lagan*	9.62%	723	744	744.8	753.8	766.53	769.53	????
UUP	John Ashenhurst	8.70%	654	654	658.16	668.24	668.24	750.2	????
UUP	William Thompson	6.08%	457	457	461.72	468.8	468.8	548.2	????
SDLP	Stephen McKenna*	6.83%	513	526.23	526.39	526.39	536.75	536.75	????
SDLP	Patrick McGowan	6.60%	496	503.98	503.98	504.98	512.87	512.87	????
SDLP	Arthur Breen	6.03%	453	464.13	464.13	464.13	471.39	473.39	????
Alliance	Richard Hinds	4.47%	336	336.42	336.74	337.74	337.74	339.74	????
DUP	William Caldwell	4.45%	251	251.21	281.77	292.25	292.25	305.81	????
Irish Independence	Michael Kelly	1.05%	79	179.38	179.38	181.38	273.99	273.99	????
DUP	James Mitchell	2.30%	173	173	209.8	224.2	224.2	238.92	????
UUP	Alfred Barnett*	2.58%	194	194.21	196.93	203.93	203.93		
Irish Independence	Francis Loughran	1.10%	83	146.21	146.21	147.21			
Ind. Unionist	Edward Sayers	0.98%	74	74	75.04				
Electorate: 10,778 Valid: 7,515 (69.73%) Spoilt: 166 Quota: 940 Turnout: 7,681 (71.27%)

- Data missing from stage 7 onwards

=== Area D ===
1977: 1 x SDLP, 1 x UUP, 1 x Alliance, 1 x Republican Clubs
1981: 2 x IIP, 1 x SDLP, 1 x DUP
1977-1981 Change: IIP (two seats) and DUP gain from UUP, Alliance and Republican Clubs

Omagh Area D - 7 seats
Party	Candidate	FPv%	Count								
Party	Candidate	FPv%	1	2	3	4	5	6	7	8	9
Irish Independence	Francis Conway	23.59%	984								
SDLP	Brendan Martin*	15.42%	643	654.1	691.3	760.4	906.4				
DUP	Willis Cooke	13.81%	576	576.9	576.9	582.9	584.9	584.9	983.9		
Irish Independence	Brian McGrath	7.26%	303	371.4	375.85	382.95	457.5	636.85	642	652	684
Ind. Republican	Francis McElroy*	8.99%	375	386.1	395.55	448.05	489.85	575.95	583.1	594.1	626.1
UUP	John Johnston*	10.24%	427	427.6	427.6	466.6	467.6	467.75			
Irish Independence	Patrick Walsh	6.83%	285	312.75	315.2	324.95	325.85				
SDLP	Patrick McCrory	5.39%	225	232.8	282.7	323.2					
Alliance	John Hadden*	5.63%	235	243.7	257.15						
SDLP	John McSherry	2.83%	118	122.05							
Electorate: 5,408 Valid: 4,171 (77.13%) Spoilt: 160 Quota: 835 Turnout: 4,331 (80.09%)
