= Omagh Area A =

District electoral areas in Omagh, Northern Ireland

Omagh Area A was one of the four district electoral areas in Omagh, Northern Ireland which existed from 1973 to 1985. The district elected five members to Omagh District Council, and formed part of the Mid Ulster constituencies for the Northern Ireland Assembly and UK Parliament.

It was created for the 1973 local elections, and contained the wards of Clanabogan, Dromore, Drumquin, Fairy Water and Trillick. It was abolished for the 1985 local elections and replaced by the West Tyrone DEA.

== Councillors ==
Election	Councillor (Party)	Councillor (Party)	Councillor (Party)	Councillor (Party)	Councillor (Party)
1981	Ivan Foster (DUP)	Arthur McFarland (UUP)	Liam McQuaid (SDLP)	John Skelton (SDLP)	Charles McElholm (IIP)
1977	Cecil Anderson (UUP)/ (Independent Unionist)	Arthur McFarland (UUP)	Liam McQuaid (SDLP)	John Skelton (SDLP)	Michael O'Hagan (Independent Nationalist)
1973	Cecil Anderson (UUP)/ (Independent Unionist)	Arthur McFarland (UUP)	Liam McQuaid (SDLP)	John Skelton (SDLP)	Patsy Kelly (Independent Nationalist)

== 1981 Election ==
1977: 2 x SDLP, 2 x UUP, 1 x Independent Nationalist

1981: 2 x SDLP, 1 x UUP, 1 x IIP, 1 x DUP

1977-1981 Change: IIP and DUP gain from UUP and Independent Nationalist

Omagh Area A - 5 seats
Party	Candidate	FPv%	Count						
Party	Candidate	FPv%	1	2	3	4	5	6	7
UUP	Arthur McFarland*	15.54%	846	935					
SDLP	Liam McQuaid*	15.43%	840	858	859	1,148			
Irish Independence	Charles McElholm	14.16%	771	778	780	788	799.05	1,151.05	
SDLP	John Skelton*	9.88%	538	550	550	625	841.75	943.75	
DUP	Ivan Foster	8.71%	474	518	800	800	800	807	810
UUP	William Montgomery	9.00%	490	538	577	577	577	577	580
Irish Independence	John Fahy	9.11%	496	510	512	520	530.2		
SDLP	Vincent O'Brien	6.91%	376	391	392				
DUP	George Thompson	6.06%	330	345					
Ind. Unionist	Cecil Anderson*	3.60%	196						
Alliance	Dermot McCormick	1.60%	87						
Electorate: 6,459 Valid: 5,444 (84.29%) Spoilt: 166 Quota: 908 Turnout: 5,610 (86.86%)

== 1977 Election ==
1973: 2 x SDLP, 1 x UUP, 1 x Independent Nationalist, 1 x Independent Unionist

1977: 2 x SDLP, 2 x UUP, 1 x Independent Nationalist

1973-1977 Change: Independent Unionist joins UUP

Omagh Area A - 5 seats
Party	Candidate	FPv%	Count					
Party	Candidate	FPv%	1	2	3	4	5	6
SDLP	Liam McQuaid*	23.29%	1,218					
Ind. Nationalist	Michael O'Hagan	17.54%	917					
UUP	Arthur McFarland*	17.35%	907					
SDLP	John Skelton*	9.81%	513	820.8	833.5	872.9		
UUP	Cecil Anderson*	14.15%	740	740.9	758.9	758.9	772.88	1,165.88
Alliance	Seamus McGale	7.53%	394	415.9	473.3	476.1	476.4	482.4
UUP	William Brunt	8.34%	436	436	451.3	451.4	463.58	
Alliance	Anthony Pollock	1.99%	104	117.8				
Electorate: 6,527 Valid: 5,229 (80.11%) Spoilt: 189 Quota: 872 Turnout: 5,418 (83.01%)

== 1973 Election ==
1973: 2 x SDLP, 1 x UUP, 1 x Independent Unionist, 1 x Independent Nationalist

Omagh Area A - 5 seats
Party	Candidate	FPv%	Count					
Party	Candidate	FPv%	1	2	3	4	5	6
UUP	Arthur McFarland	27.70%	1,456					
SDLP	Liam McQuaid	22.66%	1,191					
Ind. Unionist	Cecil Anderson	16.45%	865	1,424.2				
SDLP	John Skelton	9.09%	478	478	478.4	680.16	694.8	825.58
Ind. Nationalist	Patsy Kelly	11.26%	592	592	593.6	638.58	662.3	737.76
Alliance	Seamus McGale	4.45%	234	239.6	261.2	274.72	396.2	483.56
Independent	Brendan Harper	5.73%	301	301.8	308.2	324.06	338.7	
Alliance	Eamon Logue	2.66%	140	147.2	175.6	204.2		
Electorate: 6,598 Valid: 5,257 (79.68%) Spoilt: 114 Quota: 877 Turnout: 5,371 (81.40%)
