= 1973 Omagh District Council election =

Local govt election in Northern Ireland

30 May 1973	1977 →

All 20 seats to Omagh District Council 11 seats needed for a majority
	First party	Second party	Third party
Party	UUP	SDLP	Alliance
Seats won	6	4	3
	Fourth party	Fifth party	Sixth party
Party	Ind. Nationalist	Ind. Unionist	Nationalist
Seats won	3	2	1
	Seventh party
Party	Ind. Republican
Seats won	1

Elections to Omagh District Council were held on 30 May 1973 on the same day as the other Northern Irish local government elections. The election used four district electoral areas to elect a total of 20 councillors.

== Election results ==
Party	Seats	±	First Pref. votes	FPv%	±%
UUP	6		5,399	28.7	
SDLP	4		3,279	17.4	
Ind. Nationalist	3		3,000	16.0	
Alliance	3		2,298	12.2	
Ind. Unionist	2		1,737	9.2	
Nationalist	1		934	5.0	
Ind. Republican	1		740	3.9	
United Loyalist Coalition	0		771	4.1	
Independent	0		397	2.1	
Unity	0		242	1.3	
Totals	20		18,797	100.0	—

== Districts summary ==
Results of the Omagh District Council election, 1973 by district
Ward	%	Cllrs	%	Cllrs	%	Cllrs	%	Cllrs	%	Cllrs	Total Cllrs
Ward	UUP		SDLP		Alliance		Nationalist		Others		Total Cllrs
Area A	27.7	1	31.7	3	7.1	0	0.0	0	33.5	2	5
Area B	27.0	1	0.0	0	16.7	1	0.0	0	56.3	2	4
Area C	33.7	3	25.9	2	15.0	1	15.0	1	10.4	0	7
Area D	23.2	1	0.0	0	9.8	1	0.0	0	67.0	2	4
Total	28.7	6	17.4	4	12.2	3	5.0	1	36.7	6	20

== Districts results ==
=== Area A ===
1973: 2 x SDLP, 1 x UUP, 1 x Independent Unionist, 1 x Independent Nationalist

Omagh Area A - 5 seats
Party	Candidate	FPv%	Count					
Party	Candidate	FPv%	1	2	3	4	5	6
UUP	Arthur McFarland	27.70%	1,456					
SDLP	Liam McQuaid	22.66%	1,191					
Ind. Unionist	Cecil Anderson	16.45%	865	1,424.2				
SDLP	John Skelton	9.09%	478	478	478.4	680.16	694.8	825.58
Ind. Nationalist	Patsy Kelly	11.26%	592	592	593.6	638.58	662.3	737.76
Alliance	Seamus McGale	4.45%	234	239.6	261.2	274.72	396.2	483.56
Independent	Brendan Harper	5.73%	301	301.8	308.2	324.06	338.7	
Alliance	Eamon Logue	2.66%	140	147.2	175.6	204.2		
Electorate: 6,598 Valid: 5,257 (79.68%) Spoilt: 114 Quota: 877 Turnout: 5,371 (81.40%)

=== Area B ===
1973: 1 x UUP, 1 x Alliance, 1 x Independent Nationalist, 1 x Independent Unionist

Omagh Area B - 4 seats
Party	Candidate	FPv%	Count					
Party	Candidate	FPv%	1	2	3	4	5	6
UUP	Edgar McDowell	26.99%	1,079					
Ind. Unionist	Joseph Anderson	10.13%	405	579.46	604.84	609.4	1,031.4	
Ind. Nationalist	Patrick Donnelly	16.63%	665	665	681	745	746	748
Alliance	Patrick Bogan	12.23%	489	490.82	611.76	640.76	665.38	683.38
Ind. Nationalist	William Shields	13.23%	529	529.52	531.52	618.52	624.52	627.52
Ind. Unionist	Fred Giboney	11.68%	467	554.1	570.44	570.44		
Ind. Nationalist	James McGinley	4.75%	190	191.82	192.08			
Alliance	John Chambers	4.35%	174	185.7				
Electorate: 5,301 Valid: 3,998 (75.42%) Spoilt: 89 Quota: 800 Turnout: 4,087 (77.10%)

=== Area C ===
1973: 3 x UUP, 2 x SDLP, 1 x Nationalist, 1 x Alliance

Omagh Area C - 7 seats
Party	Candidate	FPv%	Count																		
Party	Candidate	FPv%	1	2	3	4	5	6	7	8	9	10	11	12	13	14	15	16	17	18	19
UUP	Cecil Walker	14.51%	901																		
SDLP	Stephen McKenna	11.55%	717	717	736	743	751	767	797												
UUP	Norman Wilson	9.70%	602	651.14	651.14	651.14	651.14	652.14	653.14	653.14	653.21	655.4	680.18	681.18	756.9	769.16	770.16	792.16			
Alliance	Albert Cooper	3.67%	228	228.52	228.52	229.52	230.52	230.52	236.52	236.52	261.52	310.52	310.65	323.65	334.78	431.46	468.14	783.14			
Nationalist	Paddy McGill	5.67%	352	352	354	371	409	444	478	486.84	494.84	505.84	505.84	529.52	529.52	534.52	598.2	605.2	958.2		
SDLP	Gerald McEnhill	6.44%	400	400	410	410	417	425	436	439.4	445.4	455.4	455.4	520.08	521.08	533.08	752.44	767.44	834.44		
UUP	Harold McCauley	5.70%	354	385.07	385.07	385.07	385.07	385.07	386.07	386.07	389.07	393.33	408.41	408.41	548.47	555.73	559.73	592.9	596.9	617.9	619.9
United Loyalist Coalition	Edward Sayers	5.07%	315	325.53	326.66	326.66	326.66	326.66	328.66	328.66	330.66	332.66	475.65	475.65	490.21	493.47	493.47	518.99	522.99	540.99	540.99
Nationalist	Roderick O'Connor	5.17%	321	321	321	343	361	388	413	413	420	430	430	452	452	460	481.36	488.36			
Alliance	Victor Leitch	3.64%	226	227.3	227.3	227.3	228.3	230.3	231.3	231.3	251.3	294.56	296.95	299.95	313.08	439.21	450.21				
SDLP	Peter Bradley	4.12%	256	256	260	260	265	267	279	281.04	284.72	286.72	286.72	378.76	378.76	383.76					
Alliance	Ethne McClelland	2.98%	185	185.52	186.52	187.52	187.52	187.52	187.52	187.52	229.2	274.2	274.46	276.46	279.59						
UUP	James Charleton	3.74%	232	246.82	246.82	246.82	246.82	246.82	246.82	246.82	247.82	248.82	257.86	259.86							
SDLP	Liam Brogan	3.13%	194	194	197	197	205	211	222	226.08	230.08	232.08	232.08								
United Loyalist Coalition	Ernest Marshall	3.09%	192	200.19	200.19	200.19	200.19	200.19	200.19	200.19	200.19	200.19									
Alliance	James Cunningham	2.43%	151	151.65	151.65	152.65	153.65	158.65	161.65	161.65	188.65										
Alliance	Enda McShane	2.30%	143	143.13	144.13	148.13	149.13	152.13	152.13	153.49											
Ind. Nationalist	Michael Cunningham	2.17%	135	135	136	138	138	151													
Nationalist	Jackie Martin	1.69%	105	105	105	108	118														
Nationalist	Paddy Doherty	1.42%	88	88	89	99															
Nationalist	Felix McRory	1.10%	68	68	68																
SDLP	Henry Graham	0.69%	43	43.13																	
Electorate: 8,980 Valid: 6,208 (69.13%) Spoilt: 73 Quota: 777 Turnout: 6,281 (69.94%)

=== Area D ===
1973: 1 x UUP, 1 x Alliance, 1 x Independent Nationalist, 1 x Independent Republican

Omagh Area D - 7 seats
Party	Candidate	FPv%	Count						
Party	Candidate	FPv%	1	2	3	4	5	6	7
UUP	John Johnston	23.25%	775						
Ind. Republican	Francis McElroy	22.20%	740						
Ind. Nationalist	Michael McNulty	12.24%	408	411.15	420.03	436.83	471.95	571.06	595.86
Alliance	John Hadden	9.84%	328	337.9	343.9	366.5	395.88	427.92	526.37
Ind. Nationalist	Patrick McCrory	10.02%	334	334	340.48	344.68	406.68	520.2	524.25
United Loyalist Coalition	Ivan Burnside	7.92%	264	352.35	352.47	352.47	353.62	362.62	
Unity	John Bradley	7.26%	242	242.15	266.99	297.43	325.79		
Ind. Nationalist	Michael McAteer	4.41%	147	147.45	158.73	181.49			
Independent	Michael Donaghy	2.88%	96	96	108.72				
Electorate: 5,274 Valid: 3,334 (63.22%) Spoilt: 71 Quota: 667 Turnout: 3,405 (64.56%)
