= Omagh Area B =

District electoral areas in Omagh, Northern Ireland

Omagh Area B was one of the four district electoral areas in Omagh, Northern Ireland which existed from 1973 to 1985. The district elected four members to Omagh District Council, and formed part of the Mid Ulster constituencies for the Northern Ireland Assembly and UK Parliament.

It was created for the 1973 local elections, and contained the wards of Beragh, Fintona, Newtownsaville and Sixmilecross. It was abolished for the 1985 local elections with Beragh and Sixmilecross moving to the Mid Tyrone DEA, and Fintona and Newtownsaville moving to the West Tyrone DEA.

== Councillors ==
Election	Councillor (Party)	Councillor (Party)	Councillor (Party)	Councillor (Party)
1981	James McConnell (DUP)	Robert Moses (UUP)	Patrick Bogan (Alliance)	Patrick Donnelly (IIP)/ (Independent Nationalist)
1977	Edgar McDowell (UUP)	Joseph Anderson (UUP)/ (Independent Unionist)	Patrick Bogan (Alliance)	Patrick Donnelly (IIP)/ (Independent Nationalist)
1973	Edgar McDowell (UUP)	Joseph Anderson (UUP)/ (Independent Unionist)	Patrick Bogan (Alliance)	Patrick Donnelly (IIP)/ (Independent Nationalist)

== 1981 Election ==
1977: 2 x UUP, 1 x Alliance, 1 x Independent Nationalist

1981: 1 x UUP, 1 x Alliance, 1 x DUP, 1 x IIP

1977-1981 Change: DUP gain from UUP, Independent Nationalist joins IIP

Omagh Area B - 4 seats
Party	Candidate	FPv%	Count						
Party	Candidate	FPv%	1	2	3	4	5	6	7
Irish Independence	Patrick Donnelly*	13.81%	623	623	715	1,014			
UUP	Robert Moses	13.23%	597	616	618	619	619	1,101	
DUP	James McConnell	11.35%	512	709	710	710	710	802.5	966.02
Alliance	Patrick Bogan*	12.64%	570	570	674	768	825	833	866.6
Independent	John Mullin	13.39%	604	605	643	742	793.75	794.75	794.75
UUP	John Hutchinson	12.21%	551	586	587	587	588.5		
Republican Clubs	Tommy Owens	9.02%	407	407	539				
SDLP	Eugene Donnelly	8.71%	393	394					
DUP	William McFarland	5.63%	254						
Electorate: 5,332 Valid: 4,511 (84.60%) Spoilt: 120 Quota: 903 Turnout: 4,631 (86.85%)

== 1977 Election ==
1973: 1 x UUP, 1 x Alliance, 1 x Independent Nationalist, 1 x Independent Unionist

1977: 2 x UUP, 1 x Alliance, 1 x Independent Nationalist

1973-1977 Change: Independent Unionist joins UUP

Omagh Area B - 4 seats
Party	Candidate	FPv%	Count			
Party	Candidate	FPv%	1	2	3	4
UUP	Edgar McDowell*	24.53%	971			
UUP	Joseph Anderson*	18.24%	722	741	904.21	
Ind. Nationalist	Patrick Donnelly*	18.62%	737	780	780.57	783.61
Alliance	Patrick Bogan*	15.89%	629	716	725.12	754.19
SDLP	Kevin McNaboe	17.08%	676	720	720.19	721.52
Alliance	Patrick Donnelly	5.63%	223			
Electorate: 5,289 Valid: 3,958 (74.83%) Spoilt: 224 Quota: 792 Turnout: 4,182 (79.07%)

== 1973 Election ==
1973: 1 x UUP, 1 x Alliance, 1 x Independent Nationalist, 1 x Independent Unionist

Omagh Area B - 4 seats
Party	Candidate	FPv%	Count					
Party	Candidate	FPv%	1	2	3	4	5	6
UUP	Edgar McDowell	26.99%	1,079					
Ind. Unionist	Joseph Anderson	10.13%	405	579.46	604.84	609.4	1,031.4	
Ind. Nationalist	Patrick Donnelly	16.63%	665	665	681	745	746	748
Alliance	Patrick Bogan	12.23%	489	490.82	611.76	640.76	665.38	683.38
Ind. Nationalist	William Shields	13.23%	529	529.52	531.52	618.52	624.52	627.52
Ind. Unionist	Fred Giboney	11.68%	467	554.1	570.44	570.44		
Ind. Nationalist	James McGinley	4.75%	190	191.82	192.08			
Alliance	John Chambers	4.35%	174	185.7				
Electorate: 5,301 Valid: 3,998 (75.42%) Spoilt: 89 Quota: 800 Turnout: 4,087 (77.10%)
