= Omagh Area D =

District electoral areas in Omagh, Northern Ireland

Omagh Area D was one of the four district electoral areas in Omagh, Northern Ireland which existed from 1973 to 1985. The district elected four members to Omagh District Council, and formed part of the Mid Ulster constituencies for the Northern Ireland Assembly and UK Parliament.

It was created for the 1973 local elections, and contained the wards of Carrickmore, Drumnakilly, Gortin and Owenglen. It was abolished for the 1985 local elections and replaced with the Mid Tyrone DEA.

== Councillors ==
Election	Councillor (Party)	Councillor (Party)	Councillor (Party)	Councillor (Party)
1981	Willis Cooke (DUP)	Brendan Martin (SDLP)	Francis Conway (IIP)	Brian McGrath (IIP)
1977	John Johnston (UUP)	Brendan Martin (SDLP)	John Hadden (Alliance)	Francis McElroy (Republican Clubs)/ (Independent Republican)
1973	John Johnston (UUP)	Michael McNulty (Independent Nationalist)	John Hadden (Alliance)	Francis McElroy (Republican Clubs)/ (Independent Republican)

== 1981 Election ==
1977: 1 x SDLP, 1 x UUP, 1 x Alliance, 1 x Republican Clubs

1981: 2 x IIP, 1 x SDLP, 1 x DUP

1977-1981 Change: IIP (two seats) and DUP gain from UUP, Alliance and Republican Clubs

Omagh Area D - 7 seats
Party	Candidate	FPv%	Count								
Party	Candidate	FPv%	1	2	3	4	5	6	7	8	9
Irish Independence	Francis Conway	23.59%	984								
SDLP	Brendan Martin*	15.42%	643	654.1	691.3	760.4	906.4				
DUP	Willis Cooke	13.81%	576	576.9	576.9	582.9	584.9	584.9	983.9		
Irish Independence	Brian McGrath	7.26%	303	371.4	375.85	382.95	457.5	636.85	642	652	684
Ind. Republican	Francis McElroy*	8.99%	375	386.1	395.55	448.05	489.85	575.95	583.1	594.1	626.1
UUP	John Johnston*	10.24%	427	427.6	427.6	466.6	467.6	467.75			
Irish Independence	Patrick Walsh	6.83%	285	312.75	315.2	324.95	325.85				
SDLP	Patrick McCrory	5.39%	225	232.8	282.7	323.2					
Alliance	John Hadden*	5.63%	235	243.7	257.15						
SDLP	John McSherry	2.83%	118	122.05							
Electorate: 5,408 Valid: 4,171 (77.13%) Spoilt: 160 Quota: 835 Turnout: 4,331 (80.09%)

== 1977 Election ==
1973: 1 x UUP, 1 x Alliance, 1 x Independent Nationalist, 1 x Independent Republican

1977: 1 x UUP, 1 x Alliance, 1 x SDLP, 1 x Republican Clubs

1973-1977 Change: SDLP gain from Independent Nationalist, Independent Republican joins Republican Clubs

Omagh Area D - 7 seats
Party	Candidate	FPv%	Count					
Party	Candidate	FPv%	1	2	3	4	5	6
UUP	John Johnston*	22.37%	857					
Republican Clubs	Francis McElroy*	20.91%	801					
SDLP	Brendan Martin	12.35%	473	473	482.48	589	616.32	720.08
Alliance	John Hadden*	10.88%	417	484.14	495.06	527.22	555.32	673.72
Ind. Nationalist	Michael McNulty*	10.83%	415	425.26	427.82	453.9	534.94	659.56
Ind. Nationalist	Bernard McGrath	9.92%	380	383.24	386.08	406.12	514.58	
Ind. Nationalist	Patrick McCrory	6.73%	258	263.4	264.68	297.68		
SDLP	John McSherry	6.00%	230	230	230.8			
Electorate: 5,300 Valid: 3,831 (72.28%) Spoilt: 151 Quota: 767 Turnout: 3,982 (75.13%)

== 1973 Election ==
1973: 1 x UUP, 1 x Alliance, 1 x Independent Nationalist, 1 x Independent Republican

Omagh Area D - 7 seats
Party	Candidate	FPv%	Count						
Party	Candidate	FPv%	1	2	3	4	5	6	7
UUP	John Johnston	23.25%	775						
Ind. Republican	Francis McElroy	22.20%	740						
Ind. Nationalist	Michael McNulty	12.24%	408	411.15	420.03	436.83	471.95	571.06	595.86
Alliance	John Hadden	9.84%	328	337.9	343.9	366.5	395.88	427.92	526.37
Ind. Nationalist	Patrick McCrory	10.02%	334	334	340.48	344.68	406.68	520.2	524.25
United Loyalist Coalition	Ivan Burnside	7.92%	264	352.35	352.47	352.47	353.62	362.62	
Unity	John Bradley	7.26%	242	242.15	266.99	297.43	325.79		
Ind. Nationalist	Michael McAteer	4.41%	147	147.45	158.73	181.49			
Independent	Michael Donaghy	2.88%	96	96	108.72				
Electorate: 5,274 Valid: 3,334 (63.22%) Spoilt: 71 Quota: 667 Turnout: 3,405 (64.56%)
