= Mid Tyrone (District Electoral Area) =

District electoral area in Northern Ireland

- Fermanagh and Omagh District Council DEA constituency

Current constituency
- Created: 1985
- Seats: 7 (1985-2014); 6 (2014-)
- Councillors: Roisin Devine Gallagher (SF); Shirley Hawkes (DUP); Pádraigín Kelly (SF); Ruaídhrí Lyttle (SF); Bernard McGrath (SDLP); Patrick Withers (SF)

Mid Tyrone DEA within Fermanagh and Omagh

Mid Tyrone DEA (1993-2014) within Omagh

Mid Tyrone is one of the seven district electoral areas (DEA) in Fermanagh and Omagh, Northern Ireland. The district elects six members to Fermanagh and Omagh District Council and contains the wards of Beragh, Drumnakilly, Gortin, Owenkillew, Sixmilecross and Termon. Omagh forms part of the West Tyrone constituencies for the Northern Ireland Assembly and UK Parliament.

It was created for the 1985 local elections, replacing Omagh Area B, Omagh Area C and Omagh Area D which had existed since 1973, where it originally contained seven wards (Beragh, Drumnakilly, Gortin, Killyclogher, Owenkillew, Sixmilecross and Termon). For the 2014 local elections it was reduced to six wards, losing Killyclogher to the Omagh DEA.

== Councillors ==
Election	Councillor (Party)	Councillor (Party)	Councillor (Party)	Councillor (Party)	Councillor (Party)	Councillor (Party)	Councillor (Party)
August 2025 Co-Option	Ruaídhrí Lyttle (Sinn Féin)	Patrick Withers (Sinn Féin)	Pádraigín Kelly (Sinn Féin)	Roisin Devine Gallagher (Sinn Féin)	Bernard McGrath (SDLP)	Shirley Hawkes (DUP)	6 seats 2014–present
2023	Ann-Marie Fitzgerald (Sinn Féin)	Patrick Withers (Sinn Féin)	Pádraigín Kelly (Sinn Féin)	Roisin Devine Gallagher (Sinn Féin)	Bernard McGrath (SDLP)	Shirley Hawkes (DUP)	6 seats 2014–present
November 2022 Co-Option	Séan Clarke (Sinn Féin)	Patrick Withers (Sinn Féin)	Pádraigín Kelly (Sinn Féin)	Catherine Kelly (Sinn Féin)	Emmet McAleer (Independent)	Rosemary Barton (UUP)	6 seats 2014–present
December 2021 Co-Option	Séan Clarke (Sinn Féin)	Patrick Withers (Sinn Féin)	Pádraigín Kelly (Sinn Féin)	Catherine Kelly (Sinn Féin)	Emmet McAleer (Independent)	Bert Wilson (UUP)	6 seats 2014–present
2019	Séan Clarke (Sinn Féin)	Séan Donnelly (Sinn Féin)	Pádraigín Kelly (Sinn Féin)	Catherine Kelly (Sinn Féin)	Emmet McAleer (Independent)	Bert Wilson (UUP)	6 seats 2014–present
January 2019 Defection	Séan Clarke (Sinn Féin)	Séan Donnelly (Sinn Féin)	Ann Marie Fitzgerald (Sinn Féin)	Barry McNally (Sinn Féin)	Rosemarie Shields (Aontú)/ (SDLP)	Bert Wilson (UUP)	6 seats 2014–present
2014	Séan Clarke (Sinn Féin)	Séan Donnelly (Sinn Féin)	Ann Marie Fitzgerald (Sinn Féin)	Barry McNally (Sinn Féin)	Rosemarie Shields (Aontú)/ (SDLP)	Bert Wilson (UUP)	6 seats 2014–present
2011	Séan Clarke (Sinn Féin)	Séan Donnelly (Sinn Féin)	Ann Marie Fitzgerald (Sinn Féin)	Declan McAleer (Sinn Féin)	Seamus Shields (SDLP)	Bert Wilson (UUP)	Charles Chittick (DUP)
2005	Séan Clarke (Sinn Féin)	Michael McAnespie (Sinn Féin)	Sharon O'Brien (Sinn Féin)	Declan McAleer (Sinn Féin)	Seamus Shields (SDLP)	Bert Wilson (UUP)	Charles Chittick (DUP)
2001	Séan Clarke (Sinn Féin)	Michael McAnespie (Sinn Féin)	Damien Curran (Sinn Féin)	Barney McAteer (Sinn Féin)	Seamus Shields (SDLP)	Bert Wilson (UUP)	Gerry O'Doherty (SDLP)
1997	Séan Clarke (Sinn Féin)	Michael McAnespie (Sinn Féin)	Patrick McMahon (Sinn Féin)	Joe Byrne (SDLP)	Seamus Shields (SDLP)	Desmond Anderson (UUP)	Drew Baxter (DUP)
1993	Séan Clarke (Sinn Féin)	Barney McAleer (Sinn Féin)	Patrick McMahon (Sinn Féin)	Brian McGrath (IIP)/ (Independent Nationalist)	Seamus Shields (SDLP)	Desmond Anderson (UUP)	Drew Baxter (DUP)
1989	Séan Clarke (Sinn Féin)	Barney McAleer (Sinn Féin)	Patrick McMahon (Sinn Féin)	Brian McGrath (IIP)/ (Independent Nationalist)	Seamus Shields (SDLP)	Desmond Anderson (UUP)	William Thompson (UUP)
1985	Seamus Kerr (Sinn Féin)	James McElduff (Sinn Féin)	Cormac McAleer (Sinn Féin)	Brian McGrath (IIP)/ (Independent Nationalist)	Patrick McGowan (SDLP)	Willis Cooke (DUP)	William Thompson (UUP)

== 2023 Election ==
2019: 4 x Sinn Féin, 1 x UUP, 1 x Independent

2023: 4 x Sinn Féin, 1 x DUP, 1 x SDLP

2019–2023 Change: DUP and SDLP gain from UUP and Independent

Mid Tyrone - 6 seats
Party	Candidate	FPv%	Count							
Party	Candidate	FPv%	1	2	3	4	5	6	7	8
Sinn Féin	Pádraigín Kelly*	18.98%	1,621							
Sinn Féin	Roisin Devine Gallagher	17.14%	1,464							
Sinn Féin	Anne Marie Fitzgerald* †	14.10%	1,204	1,535.68						
Sinn Féin	Patrick Withers*	12.55%	1,072	1,097.20	1,359.52					
DUP	Shirley Hawkes	12.37%	1,057	1,057.48	1,057.48	1,061.44	1,071.44	1,071.44	1,667.44	
SDLP	Bernard McGrath	5.82%	497	505.88	517.40	619.92	786.60	825.00	891.24	1,087.24
Independent	Emmet McAleer*	7.36%	629	646.28	656.84	739.12	812.76	843.00	867.92	946.92
UUP	Rosemary Barton*	8.04%	687	687.00	687.24	689.00	735.24	737.88		
Alliance	Matthew Beaumont	3.64%	311	313.88	319.40	371.76				
Electorate: 13,083 Valid: 8,542 (65.29%) Spoilt: 119 Quota: 1,221 Turnout: 8,661 (66.20%)

== 2019 Election ==
2014: 4 x Sinn Féin, 1 x UUP, 1 x SDLP

2019: 4 x Sinn Féin, 1 x UUP, 1 x Independent

2014-2019 Change: Independent gain from SDLP

Mid Tyrone - 6 seats
Party	Candidate	FPv%	Count					
Party	Candidate	FPv%	1	2	3	4	5	6
Independent	Emmet McAleer	11.09%	897	903	986	1,134	1,326	
Sinn Féin	Pádraigín Kelly	12.30%	995	1,045	1,056	1,081	1,145	1,168
Sinn Féin	Catherine Kelly	11.92%	964	1,002	1,014	1,035	1,109	1,122
UUP	Bert Wilson* †	12.10%	979	979	1,007	1,016	1,080	1,093
Sinn Féin	Sean Clarke*	10.99%	889	931	941	964	1,066	1,084
Sinn Féin	Sean Donnelly* †	9.62%	778	896	902	988	1,060	1,071
DUP	James Managh	11.51%	931	931	939	943	951	951
SDLP	Bernard McGrath	7.39%	598	619	725	825		
Aontú	Rosemarie Shields*	5.74%	464	469	491			
Alliance	Richard Bullick	3.78%	306	311				
Sinn Féin	Kevin McColgan	3.55%	287					
Electorate: 12,556 Valid: 8,088 (64.42%) Spoilt: 114 Quota: 1,156 Turnout: 8,202 (65.32%)

== 2014 Election ==
2011: 4 x Sinn Féin, 1 x UUP, 1 x SDLP, 1 x DUP

2014: 4 x Sinn Féin, 1 x UUP, 1 x SDLP

2011-2014 Change: DUP loss due to the reduction of one seat

Mid Tyrone - 6 seats
Party	Candidate	FPv%	Count					
Party	Candidate	FPv%	1	2	3	4	5	6
UUP	Bert Wilson*	17.13%	1,262					
Sinn Féin	Seán Clarke*	16.58%	1,222					
Sinn Féin	Ann Marie Fitzgerald*	15.13%	1,115					
Sinn Féin	Seán Donnelly*	13.42%	989	989	1,067.26			
Sinn Féin	Barry McNally	12.12%	893	893	965.66	1,011.92	1,043.56	1,069.56
SDLP	Rosemarie Shields* ‡	7.31%	539	542.91	545.43	548.55	642.98	1,030.06
DUP	Charlie Chittick*	8.54%	629	811.75	811.75	811.75	862.91	867.25
SDLP	Bernard McGrath	5.43%	400	402.21	411.31	416.47	493.05	
Green (NI)	Ciaran McClean	2.69%	198	204.12	206.36	209.06		
Alliance	Andrew Bullick	1.66%	122	130.16	131.98	132.46		
Electorate: 11,786 Valid: 7,369 (62.52%) Spoilt: 130 Quota: 1,053 Turnout: 7,499 (63.63%)

== 2011 Election ==
2005: 4 x Sinn Féin, 1 x UUP, 1 x SDLP, 1 x DUP

2011: 4 x Sinn Féin, 1 x UUP, 1 x SDLP, 1 x DUP

2005-2011 Change: No change

Mid Tyrone - 7 seats
Party	Candidate	FPv%	Count						
Party	Candidate	FPv%	1	2	3	4	5	6	7
Sinn Féin	Sean Clarke*	15.02%	1,211						
UUP	Bert Wilson*	14.29%	1,152						
Sinn Féin	Declan McAleer*	14.06%	1,134						
Sinn Féin	Anne Marie Fitzgerald	11.47%	925	943.54	951.9	951.9	978.52	1,113.52	
SDLP	Seamus Shields*	11.29%	910	918.46	987.9	996.48	1,007.48	1,100.48	
Sinn Féin	Sean Donnelly	9.36%	755	813.86	822.94	823.07	851.78	918.85	966.85
DUP	Charles Chittick*	9.87%	796	796.36	812.36	936.64	936.86	943.49	943.49
Sinn Féin	Sharon O'Brien*	6.54%	527	635.18	641.36	641.36	689.21	743.68	773.68
Independent	Paul Grogan	5.89%	475	478.6	523.6	524.9	527.98		
Independent	Ciaran McClean	2.21%	178	182.32					
Electorate: 12,395 Valid: 8,063 (65.05%) Spoilt: 170 Quota: 1,008 Turnout: 8,233 (66.42%)

== 2005 Election ==
2001: 4 x Sinn Féin, 2 x SDLP, 1 x UUP

2005: 4 x Sinn Féin, 1 x SDLP, 1 x UUP, 1 x DUP

2001-2005 Change: DUP gain from SDLP

Mid Tyrone - 7 seats
Party	Candidate	FPv%	Count				
Party	Candidate	FPv%	1	2	3	4	5
Sinn Féin	Sean Clarke*	16.51%	1,480				
Sinn Féin	Michael McAnespie*	13.42%	1,203				
Sinn Féin	Declan McAleer	9.54%	855	1,130.75			
SDLP	Seamus Shields*	11.25%	1,008	1,017.5	1,023.38	1,578.38	
UUP	Bert Wilson*	12.09%	1,084	1,084	1,084	1,094.57	1,155.57
Sinn Féin	Sharon O'Brien	10.04%	900	925.75	938.49	964.23	1,039.23
DUP	Charles Chittick	11.16%	1,000	1,000.25	1,000.39	1,000.64	1,008.64
Sinn Féin	Cathal McCrory	8.27%	741	763.5	820.48	856.18	935.18
SDLP	Gerry O'Doherty*	7.72%	692	710.75	712.99		
Electorate: 11,549 Valid: 8,963 (77.61%) Spoilt: 187 Quota: 1,121 Turnout: 9,150 (79.23%)

== 2001 Election ==
1997: 3 x Sinn Féin, 2 x SDLP, 1 x UUP

2001: 4 x Sinn Féin, 2 x SDLP, 1 x UUP, 1 x DUP

1997-2001 Change: Sinn Féin gain from DUP

Mid Tyrone - 7 seats
Party	Candidate	FPv%	Count				
Party	Candidate	FPv%	1	2	3	4	5
Sinn Féin	Sean Clarke*	15.14%	1,446				
Sinn Féin	Damien Curran	13.02%	1,244				
Sinn Féin	Michael McAnespie*	10.42%	995	1,007.78	1,626.78		
Sinn Féin	Barney McAleer	9.60%	917	1,128.68	1,214.68		
UUP	Bert Wilson	12.47%	1,191	1,191	1,191	1,191	1,191.44
SDLP	Seamus Shields*	10.35%	989	993.14	1,029.32	1,128.32	1,158.24
SDLP	Gerry O'Doherty	10.41%	994	1,002.46	1,015.36	1,045.36	1,063.4
DUP	Samuel McFarland	10.30%	984	984	985	987	987.66
Sinn Féin	Cathal McCrory	8.28%	791	795.86			
Electorate: 11,421 Valid: 9,551 (83.63%) Spoilt: 198 Quota: 1,194 Turnout: 9,749 (85.36%)

== 1997 Election ==
1993: 3 x Sinn Féin, 1 x SDLP, 1 x UUP, 1 x DUP, 1 x Independent Nationalist

1997: 3 x Sinn Féin, 2 x SDLP, 1 x UUP, 1 x DUP

1993-1997 Change: SDLP gain from Independent Nationalist

Mid Tyrone - 7 seats
Party	Candidate	FPv%	Count							
Party	Candidate	FPv%	1	2	3	4	5	6	7	8
Sinn Féin	Patrick McMahon*	16.77%	1,375							
Sinn Féin	Sean Clarke*	13.77%	1,129							
UUP	Desmond Anderson*	12.51%	1,026							
Sinn Féin	Michael McAnespie	11.95%	980	1,148.48						
SDLP	Joe Byrne*	9.84%	807	811.68	813.77	817.01	835.01	857.46	868.46	1,092.46
SDLP	Seamus Shields*	9.04%	741	761.02	764.63	765.89	772.89	838.67	843.67	994.57
DUP	Drew Baxter*	6.62%	543	543	543	543	545	548	960	962.09
Sinn Féin	Barney McAleer*	4.66%	382	525.52	629.07	713.76	714.03	724.53	726.05	874.16
Ind. Nationalist	Brian McGrath*	6.76%	554	561.54	568.19	575.21	578.3	599.82	605.82	
DUP	Jim Patterson	3.46%	284	284.26	284.26	284.26	284.26	285.26		
UUP	John Anderson	2.12%	174	174.52	174.52	174.52	191.52	197.52		
Democratic Left	Patrick McClean	1.80%	148	150.86	151.81	152.08	158.08			
Alliance	Paul Gallagher	0.70%	57	57.26	57.26	57.62				
Electorate: 10,661 Valid: 8,200 (76.92%) Spoilt: 187 Quota: 1,026 Turnout: 8,387 (78.67%)

== 1993 Election ==
1989: 3 x Sinn Féin, 2 x UUP, 1 x SDLP, 1 x Independent Nationalist

1993: 3 x Sinn Féin, 1 x UUP, 1 x SDLP, 1 x DUP, 1 x Independent Nationalist

1989-1993 Change: DUP gain from UUP

Mid Tyrone - 7 seats
Party	Candidate	FPv%	Count									
Party	Candidate	FPv%	1	2	3	4	5	6	7	8	9	10
Sinn Féin	Patrick McMahon*	15.90%	1,216									
UUP	Desmond Anderson*	13.18%	1,008									
Sinn Féin	Barney McAleer*	11.52%	881	1,007.5								
Sinn Féin	Sean Clarke*	10.94%	837	936	936	936.15	983.31					
DUP	Drew Baxter	6.55%	501	501	505	515.3	515.3	515.3	784.65	788.65	1,004.65	
SDLP	Seamus Shields*	8.03%	614	630.94	644.16	644.91	646.71	650.85	651.9	747.56	753.21	934.3
Ind. Nationalist	Brian McGrath*	9.15%	700	705.06	728.06	728.21	728.48	733.07	733.07	789.38	794.68	863.92
SDLP	Nuala McSherry	6.20%	474	474.88	491.88	492.13	492.22	492.58	492.58	631.07	633.07	668.32
Democratic Left	Patrick McClean	4.45%	340	346.16	369.6	370.15	370.69	371.14	375.14	391.36	409.71	
UUP	William Oldcroft	3.77%	288	288	309	343.2	343.2	343.2	379.55	380.6		
SDLP	Patrick McLaughlin	4.43%	339	340.76	356.76	356.86	357.4	357.76	357.76			
DUP	Jim Patterson	4.09%	313	313	314	317.05	317.05	317.05				
Alliance	James Lagan	1.80%	138	138.88								
Electorate: 9,970 Valid: 7,649 (76.72%) Spoilt: 228 Quota: 957 Turnout: 7,877 (79.01%)

== 1989 Election ==
1985: 3 x Sinn Féin, 1 x UUP, 1 x SDLP, 1 x DUP, 1 x IIP

1989: 3 x Sinn Féin, 2 x UUP, 1 x SDLP, 1 x Independent Nationalist

1985-1989 Change: UUP gain from DUP, Independent Nationalist leaves IIP

Mid Tyrone - 7 seats
Party	Candidate	FPv%	Count							
Party	Candidate	FPv%	1	2	3	4	5	6	7	8
Sinn Féin	Patrick McMahon	15.41%	1,186							
Sinn Féin	Barney McAleer*	10.24%	788	962.04						
UUP	Desmond Anderson	11.78%	906	906	923	933	975			
SDLP	Seamus Shields	9.55%	735	750.58	769.96	859.53	859.53	1,320.53		
Ind. Nationalist	Brian McGrath*	11.33%	872	877.89	892.89	939.89	940.89	1,017.89		
Sinn Féin	Sean Clarke	9.10%	700	715.01	715.01	727.58	728.58	748.77	817.77	830.77
UUP	William Thompson*	8.90%	685	685	727	739	752	765.57	773.57	774.57
DUP	Willis Cooke*	6.32%	486	486	489	489	750	751	756	756
SDLP	Nuala McSherry	7.81%	601	603.47	635.47	679.47	681.66			
DUP	Tommy Armstrong	4.21%	324	324.19	325.19	325.19				
Workers' Party	Patrick McClean	3.17%	244	246.47	269.47					
Alliance	Ethne McClelland	2.17%	167	167.38						
Electorate: 10,300 Valid: 7,694 (74.70%) Spoilt: 273 Quota: 962 Turnout: 7,967 (77.35%)

== 1985 Election ==
1985: 3 x Sinn Féin, 1 x DUP, 1 x UUP, 1 x SDLP, 1 x IIP

Mid Tyrone - 7 seats
Party	Candidate	FPv%	Count							
Party	Candidate	FPv%	1	2	3	4	5	6	7	8
Sinn Féin	Seamus Kerr	20.93%	1,634							
Sinn Féin	James McElduff	12.49%	975	1,325.55						
Sinn Féin	Cormac McAleer	11.71%	914	1,141.55						
UUP	William Thompson*	10.55%	824	824	824	824	982			
SDLP	Patrick McGowan	7.29%	569	577.2	589.09	603.85	604.85	683.18	993.18	
DUP	Willis Cooke*	11.05%	863	863	863	863	908	928.41	930.41	937.82
Irish Independence	Brian McGrath*	4.74%	370	378.2	487.26	530.31	530.31	545.36	580.69	696.29
DUP	Tommy Armstrong	6.53%	510	510	510	510	520	528	528	530.82
Workers' Party	Patrick McClean	3.24%	253	291.54	311.63	334.18	334.59	443.48	476.22	
SDLP	Nuala McSherry	4.87%	380	388.61	397.63	405.83	405.83	438.24		
Alliance	Patrick Bogan*	3.80%	297	310.53	315.04	323.24	326.24			
UUP	Cecil Beattie	2.80%	219	219.41	219.41	219.41				
Electorate: 9,722 Valid: 7,808 (80.31%) Spoilt: 140 Quota: 977 Turnout: 7,948 (81.75%)
