= 1977 Omagh District Council election =

Local government election in Northern Ireland

← 1973	18 May 1977	1981 →

All 20 seats to Omagh District Council 11 seats needed for a majority
	First party	Second party	Third party
Party	UUP	SDLP	Alliance
Seats won	8	6	3
Seat change	▲2	▲2	0
	Fourth party	Fifth party	Sixth party
Party	Ind. Nationalist	Republican Clubs	Ind. Unionist
Seats won	2	1	0
Seat change	▼1	▲1	▼2
	Seventh party	Eighth party
Party	Nationalist	Ind. Republican
Seats won	0	0
Seat change	▼1	▼1

Elections to Omagh District Council were held on 18 May 1977 on the same day as the other Northern Irish local government elections. The election used four district electoral areas to elect a total of 20 councillors.

== Election results ==
Omagh District Council Election Result 1977
Party	Seats	Gains	Losses	Net gain/loss	Seats %	Votes %	Votes	+/−
UUP	8	2	0	▲2	40.0	35.9	6,868	▲7.2
SDLP	6	2	0	▲2	30.0	29.6	5,671	▲12.2
Alliance	3	0	0	0	15.0	16.0	3,071	▲3.8
Ind. Nationalist	2	1	2	▼1	10.0	14.1	2,707	▼1.9
Republican Clubs	1	1	0	▲1	5.0	4.2	801	New

Note: "Votes" are the first preference votes.

== Districts summary ==
Results of the Omagh District Council election, 1977 by district
Ward	%	Cllrs	%	Cllrs	%	Cllrs	%	Cllrs	%	Cllrs	Total Cllrs
Ward	UUP		SDLP		Alliance		RC		Others		Total Cllrs
Area A	39.8	2	33.1	1	9.5	0	0.0	0	17.6	1	5
Area B	42.8	2	17.1	0	21.5	1	0.0	0	18.6	1	4
Area C	36.9	3	41.8	3	21.3	1	0.0	0	0.0	0	7
Area D	22.4	1	18.4	1	10.9	1	20.9	1	27.4	0	4
Total	35.9	8	29.6	6	16.0	3	4.2	1	14.3	2	20

== Districts results ==
=== Area A ===
1973: 2 x SDLP, 1 x UUP, 1 x Independent Nationalist, 1 x Independent Unionist
1977: 2 x SDLP, 2 x UUP, 1 x Independent Nationalist
1973-1977 Change: Independent Unionist joins UUP

Omagh Area A - 5 seats
Party	Candidate	FPv%	Count					
Party	Candidate	FPv%	1	2	3	4	5	6
SDLP	Liam McQuaid*	23.29%	1,218					
Ind. Nationalist	Michael O'Hagan	17.54%	917					
UUP	Arthur McFarland*	17.35%	907					
SDLP	John Skelton*	9.81%	513	820.8	833.5	872.9		
UUP	Cecil Anderson*	14.15%	740	740.9	758.9	758.9	772.88	1,165.88
Alliance	Seamus McGale	7.53%	394	415.9	473.3	476.1	476.4	482.4
UUP	William Brunt	8.34%	436	436	451.3	451.4	463.58	
Alliance	Anthony Pollock	1.99%	104	117.8				
Electorate: 6,527 Valid: 5,229 (80.11%) Spoilt: 189 Quota: 872 Turnout: 5,418 (83.01%)

=== Area B ===
1973: 1 x UUP, 1 x Alliance, 1 x Independent Nationalist, 1 x Independent Unionist
1977: 2 x UUP, 1 x Alliance, 1 x Independent Nationalist
1973-1977 Change: Independent Unionist joins UUP

Omagh Area B - 4 seats
Party	Candidate	FPv%	Count			
Party	Candidate	FPv%	1	2	3	4
UUP	Edgar McDowell*	24.53%	971			
UUP	Joseph Anderson*	18.24%	722	741	904.21	
Ind. Nationalist	Patrick Donnelly*	18.62%	737	780	780.57	783.61
Alliance	Patrick Bogan*	15.89%	629	716	725.12	754.19
SDLP	Kevin McNaboe	17.08%	676	720	720.19	721.52
Alliance	Patrick Donnelly	5.63%	223			
Electorate: 5,289 Valid: 3,958 (74.83%) Spoilt: 224 Quota: 792 Turnout: 4,182 (79.07%)

=== Area C ===
1973: 3 x UUP, 2 x SDLP, 1 x Alliance, 1 x Nationalist
1977: 3 x UUP, 3 x SDLP, 1 x Alliance
1973-1977 Change: SDLP gain from Nationalist

Omagh Area C - 7 seats
Party	Candidate	FPv%	Count							
Party	Candidate	FPv%	1	2	3	4	5	6	7	8
Alliance	Aidan Lagan	16.51%	1,012							
SDLP	Gerald McEnhill*	15.17%	930							
UUP	Cecil Walker*	14.37%	881							
SDLP	Stephen McKenna*	11.45%	702	746.25	849.78					
UUP	Alfred Barnett	8.79%	539	539.25	539.42	568.02	568.02	787.02		
UUP	Harold McCauley*	7.37%	452	457.75	458.26	509.09	509.37	685.63	703	857
SDLP	Bernadette Grant	8.73%	535	555	578.97	579.23	618.57	620.95	620.95	726.31
SDLP	Daniel Campbell	6.43%	394	412	434.44	434.44	470.84	475.22	475.31	539.32
Alliance	Ethne McClelland	4.76%	292	443	447.25	449.59	454.21	467.66	468.29	
UUP	Archibald Burton	6.41%	393	394.25	394.25	424.93	425.07			
Electorate: 10,073 Valid: 6,130 (60.86%) Spoilt: 277 Quota: 767 Turnout: 6,407 (63.61%)

=== Area D ===
1973: 1 x UUP, 1 x Alliance, 1 x Independent Nationalist, 1 x Independent Republican
1977: 1 x UUP, 1 x Alliance, 1 x SDLP, 1 x Republican Clubs
1973-1977 Change: SDLP gain from Independent Nationalist, Independent Republican joins Republican Clubs

Omagh Area D - 7 seats
Party	Candidate	FPv%	Count					
Party	Candidate	FPv%	1	2	3	4	5	6
UUP	John Johnston*	22.37%	857					
Republican Clubs	Francis McElroy*	20.91%	801					
SDLP	Brendan Martin	12.35%	473	473	482.48	589	616.32	720.08
Alliance	John Hadden*	10.88%	417	484.14	495.06	527.22	555.32	673.72
Ind. Nationalist	Michael McNulty*	10.83%	415	425.26	427.82	453.9	534.94	659.56
Ind. Nationalist	Bernard McGrath	9.92%	380	383.24	386.08	406.12	514.58	
Ind. Nationalist	Patrick McCrory	6.73%	258	263.4	264.68	297.68		
SDLP	John McSherry	6.00%	230	230	230.8			
Electorate: 5,300 Valid: 3,831 (72.28%) Spoilt: 151 Quota: 767 Turnout: 3,982 (75.13%)
