= Paddy McGill (hurler) =

Irish hurler

Personal information
- Native name: Padraig Mac An Ghaill (Irish)
- Born: 1988 (age 37–38) Cushendall, County Antrim, Northern Ireland
- Height: 6 ft 1 in (185 cm)

Sport
- Sport: Hurling
- Position: Right corner-forward
Club
- Years: Club
- Ruairí Óg
Club titles
- Antrim titles: 4
- Ulster titles: 3
Inter-county
- Years: County
- 2006-: Antrim
Inter-county titles
- Ulster titles: 3
- All-Irelands: 0
- NHL: 0
- All Stars: 0

Patrick McGill (born 1988) is an Irish hurler who plays as a right corner-forward for the Antrim senior team.

Born in Cushendall, County Antrim, McGill was introduced to hurling in his youth. He enjoyed some success at colleges level with St MacNissi's College while simultaneously enjoying championship successes at underage levels with the Ruairí Óg, Cushendall club. A three-time Ulster medal winner with the Cushendall senior team, McGill has also won four championship medals.

McGill made his debut on the inter-county scene at the age of sixteen when he first linked up with the Antrim minor team. An Ulster medal winner in this grade, he later won an Ulster medal with the under-21 team. McGill joined the senior team during the 2006 Christy Ring Cup. He went on to play a key role for Antrim in attack, and won three Ulster medals.

== Honours ==
=== Team ===
Antrim

- Ulster Senior Club Hurling Championship (3): 2006, 2008, 2015
- Antrim Senior Club Hurling Championship (4): 2006, 2008, 2014, 2015

Antrim

- Ulster Senior Hurling Championship (3): 2006, 2007, 2008
- Walsh Cup (1): 2008
- Ulster Under-21 Hurling Championship (2): 2009
- Ulster Minor Hurling Championship (2): 2005, 2006
