= William Thompson (Ulster Unionist politician) =

Member of Parliament for West Tyrone
- In office 1 May 1997 – 14 May 2001
- Preceded by: Constituency Established
- Succeeded by: Pat Doherty

Member of Omagh District Council
- In office 15 May 1985 – 19 May 1993
- Preceded by: New district
- Succeeded by: Drew Baxter
- Constituency: Mid Tyrone
- In office 20 October 1981 – 15 May 1985
- Preceded by: Alfred Barnett
- Succeeded by: District abolished
- Constituency: Omagh Area C

Member of the Northern Ireland Assembly for Mid Ulster
- In office 20 October 1982 – 1986
- Preceded by: Assembly re-established
- Succeeded by: Assembly dissolved
- In office 28 June 1973 – 1974
- Preceded by: New assembly
- Succeeded by: Assembly abolished

Member of the Constitutional Convention for Mid Ulster
- In office 1975–1976
- Preceded by: New convention
- Succeeded by: Convention dissolved

Personal details
- Born: 26 October 1939 Beragh, Northern Ireland
- Died: 12 December 2010 (aged 71) Omagh, Northern Ireland
- Party: Ulster Unionist Party
- Spouse: Violet
- Children: Wilma; Elaine; Paul
- Profession: Farmer, postmaster

William John "Willie" Thompson (26 October 1939 – 12 December 2010) was a Northern Irish Ulster Unionist Party (UUP) politician. He served as Member of Parliament (MP) for West Tyrone from 1997 to 2001. He was one of the UUP members opposed to the Good Friday Agreement. He was the local MP when the Omagh bombing took place in his constituency on 15 August 1998.

== Elections in the 1970s and 1980s ==
He had previously been elected from the Mid Ulster constituency as an Ulster Unionist for the 1973 and 1982 Assemblies and the Northern Ireland Constitutional Convention in 1975. In 1983 he sought election to Westminster in the Mid Ulster constituency, however he finished fourth with 7,066 votes, losing to the DUP's Willie McCrea.

Northern Ireland Assembly (1973)
New assembly	Assembly Member for Mid-Ulster; 1973–1974	Assembly abolished
Northern Ireland Constitutional Convention
New convention	Member for Mid-Ulster; 1975–1976	Convention dissolved
Northern Ireland Assembly (1982)
New assembly	MPA for Mid-Ulster; 1982–1986	Assembly abolished
Parliament of the United Kingdom
New constituency	Member of Parliament for West Tyrone; 1997–2001	Succeeded by Pat Doherty
