= Paddy McGill =

Northern Ireland politician (1913–1977)

Member of the Senate of Northern Ireland
- In office 1953-1972

Personal details
- Born: 1913
- Died: 1977 (aged 63–64)
- Political party: Irish Nationalist
- Education: Queen's University Belfast

Patrick Francis McGill (1913–1977) was a journalist and nationalist politician in Ireland.

== Biography ==
McGill was the editor-in-chief of the Ulster Herald series of newspapers, and was a Nationalist Party member of the Senate of Northern Ireland from 1953 until the body was abolished in 1972.

McGill served as the Secretary of the Irish Anti-Partition League from 1953 until its dissolution 1956, and as Secretary of the Parliamentary Nationalist Party from 1958. During this time, he adopted a cautious approach towards modernising party structures, in contrast to Eddie McGrady.

In 1965, McGill was awarded a PhD from Queen's University Belfast, having written his thesis on The Senate in Northern Ireland, 1921-1962. He served as a Deputy Speaker of the Senate from 1965 until its abolition. He stood for Mid Ulster at the 1973 Northern Ireland Assembly election, but was unsuccessful.
