= 1985 Omagh District Council election =

Local govt election in Northern Ireland

← 1981	15 May 1985	1989 →

All 21 seats to Omagh District Council 11 seats needed for a majority
	First party	Second party	Third party
Party	Sinn Féin	SDLP	DUP
Seats won	6	5	4
Seat change	▲6	0	0
	Fourth party	Fifth party	Sixth party
Party	UUP	Irish Independence	Independent Labour
Seats won	4	1	1
Seat change	0	▼4	▲1
	Seventh party
Party	Alliance
Seats won	0
Seat change	▼2

Elections to Omagh District Council were held on 15 May 1985 on the same day as the other Northern Irish local government elections. The election used three district electoral areas to elect a total of 21 councillors.

== Election results ==
Omagh District Council Election Result 1985
Party	Seats	Gains	Losses	Net gain/loss	Seats %	Votes %	Votes	+/−
Sinn Féin	6	6	0	▲6	28.6	31.6	7,011	New
SDLP	5	0	0	0	23.8	17.6	3,905	▼7.4
DUP	4	0	0	0	19.0	18.9	4,200	▲2.3
UUP	4	0	0	0	19.0	16.8	3,724	▼2.7
Irish Independence	1	0	4	▼4	4.8	4.2	932	▼18.0
Independent Labour	1	1	0	▲1	4.8	3.5	779	▲3.5
Alliance	0	0	2	▼2	0.0	4.7	1,048	▼4.3
Workers' Party	0	0	0	0	0.0	2.7	600	▲0.8

Note: "Votes" are the first preference votes.

== Districts summary ==
Results of the Omagh District Council election, 1985 by district
Ward	%	Cllrs	%	Cllrs	%	Cllrs	%	Cllrs	%	Cllrs	%	Cllrs	Total Cllrs
Ward	Sinn Féin		SDLP		DUP		UUP		IIP		Others		Total Cllrs
Mid Tyrone	45.1	3	12.2	1	17.6	1	13.4	1	4.7	1	7.0	0	7
Omagh Town	18.7	1	20.9	2	22.7	2	13.4	1	1.2	0	23.1	1	7
West Tyrone	28.7	2	20.2	2	17.1	1	22.9	2	6.3	0	4.8	0	7
Total	31.6	6	17.6	5	18.9	4	16.8	4	4.2	1	10.9	1	21

== District results ==
=== Mid Tyrone ===
1985: 3 x Sinn Féin, 1 x DUP, 1 x UUP, 1 x SDLP, 1 x IIP

Mid Tyrone - 7 seats
Party	Candidate	FPv%	Count							
Party	Candidate	FPv%	1	2	3	4	5	6	7	8
Sinn Féin	Seamus Kerr	20.93%	1,634							
Sinn Féin	James McElduff	12.49%	975	1,325.55						
Sinn Féin	Cormac McAleer	11.71%	914	1,141.55						
UUP	William Thompson*	10.55%	824	824	824	824	982			
SDLP	Patrick McGowan	7.29%	569	577.2	589.09	603.85	604.85	683.18	993.18	
DUP	Willis Cooke*	11.05%	863	863	863	863	908	928.41	930.41	937.82
Irish Independence	Brian McGrath*	4.74%	370	378.2	487.26	530.31	530.31	545.36	580.69	696.29
DUP	Tommy Armstrong	6.53%	510	510	510	510	520	528	528	530.82
Workers' Party	Patrick McClean	3.24%	253	291.54	311.63	334.18	334.59	443.48	476.22	
SDLP	Nuala McSherry	4.87%	380	388.61	397.63	405.83	405.83	438.24		
Alliance	Patrick Bogan*	3.80%	297	310.53	315.04	323.24	326.24			
UUP	Cecil Beattie	2.80%	219	219.41	219.41	219.41				
Electorate: 9,722 Valid: 7,808 (80.31%) Spoilt: 140 Quota: 977 Turnout: 7,948 (81.75%)

=== Omagh Town ===
1985: 2 x SDLP, 2 x DUP, 1 x Sinn Féin, 1 x UUP, 1 x Independent Labour

Omagh Town - 7 seats
Party	Candidate	FPv%	Count												
Party	Candidate	FPv%	1	2	3	4	5	6	7	8	9	10	11	12	13
Sinn Féin	Francis Mackey	18.74%	1,213												
DUP	Oliver Gibson*	13.10%	848												
Independent Labour	Johnny McLaughlin	12.03%	779	949.04											
SDLP	Bernadette Grant*	9.05%	586	642.55	674.53	674.57	676.96	677.04	682.43	710.76	747.43	1,002.43			
UUP	Wilfred Breen	7.15%	463	465.73	466.12	467.92	468.92	474.48	479.48	482.48	484.65	485.69	485.69	839.69	
SDLP	Stephen McKenna*	6.50%	421	448.69	459.22	459.22	469.22	469.22	469.22	503.95	541.06	624.05	793.34	796.12	796.39
DUP	David Aiken	7.99%	517	517	517	534.16	534.16	633.48	636.52	637.91	637.91	639.95	640.76	686.92	710.68
Alliance	Aidan Lagan*	5.78%	374	389.21	404.42	404.7	432.09	432.09	555.48	599.03	624.78	663.63	683.88	703.04	708.08
UUP	Thomas Strain	6.21%	402	402	403.95	406.27	407.27	415.71	428.83	430.22	431.61	441.04	441.04		
SDLP	Arthur Breen	5.34%	346	362.77	369.01	369.13	374.52	375.52	377.52	403.98	428.68				
Irish Independence	James Sweeney	1.16%	75	156.12	206.04	206.08	206.08	206.08	206.08	217.54					
Workers' Party	Hugh Gormley	2.21%	143	166.01	185.51	185.55	189.33	189.41	189.8						
Alliance	Richard Hinds	1.99%	129	129.78	130.17	130.33	151.33	154.33							
DUP	Raymond Farrell	1.62%	105	105	105	116.64	118.64								
Alliance	Dermot McCormick	1.13%	73	74.95	76.51	76.51									
Electorate: 9,554 Valid: 6,474 (67.76%) Spoilt: 124 Quota: 810 Turnout: 6,598 (69.06%)

=== West Tyrone ===
1985: 2 x UUP, 2 x SDLP, 2 x Sinn Féin, 1 x DUP

West Tyrone - 7 seats
Party	Candidate	FPv%	Count												
Party	Candidate	FPv%	1	2	3	4	5	6	7	8	9	10	11	12	13
UUP	Arthur McFarland*	14.98%	1,186												
Sinn Féin	Cathal Quinn	14.03%	1,111												
DUP	Harry Cairns	11.85%	938	952.24	952.24	952.24	1,029.24								
UUP	Robert Moses*	7.96%	630	790.8	790.91	790.91	809.79	815.19	848.51	856.78	1,107.78				
SDLP	Liam McQuaid*	10.60%	839	839.32	861.65	870.98	871.3	871.3	896.3	934.4	935.1	940.1	1,161.1		
Sinn Féin	Gerry McMenamin	9.32%	738	738	799.16	799.16	800.16	800.16	803.16	830.93	831.93	831.93	840.26	842.96	980.41
SDLP	Gregory McMullan	4.98%	394	394.32	394.54	397.54	399.54	399.54	435.54	502.98	503.46	504.46	578.68	727.18	879.22
Sinn Féin	James McElhinney	5.38%	426	426	448.11	471.33	473.33	473.33	475.33	479.55	479.55	480.55	526.88	539.48	584.14
Irish Independence	Patrick Donnelly*	4.38%	347	347	349.97	420.3	420.41	420.41	429.41	473.52	473.52	474.52	488.74	495.94	
SDLP	John Skelton*	4.67%	370	370.16	372.58	395.85	395.85	395.85	402.85	417.85	418.39	421.39			
DUP	George Thompson	3.39%	268	273.76	273.76	273.76	322.52	356	362.32	364.48					
Workers' Party	Tommy Owens	2.58%	204	204.32	207.62	209.62	209.62	209.62	244.62						
Alliance	Eric Bullick	2.21%	175	175.8	175.8	175.8	175.8	175.8							
DUP	Hazel McKenzie	1.91%	151	156.6	156.71	157.71									
Irish Independence	James Connolly	1.77%	140	140.16	141.15										
Electorate: 9,690 Valid: 7,917 (81.70%) Spoilt: 174 Quota: 990 Turnout: 8,091 (83.50%)
