= Demographics of Northern Ireland =

- Population pyramid of Northern Ireland in 2020
- Population: 1,903,175 (2021 census)
- Density: 133 per km^{2}
- Life expectancy
  - male: 78.4 years
  - female: 82.3 years

Age structure
- 0–14 years: 19%
- 15–64 years: 64%
- 65 and over: 17%

Nationality
- Major ethnic: White 97%
- Minor ethnic: other ethnic groups 3%

Northern Ireland is the smallest of the four parts of the United Kingdom in terms of both area and population, containing 2.9% of the total population and 5.7% of the total area of the United Kingdom. It is the smaller of the two political entities on the island of Ireland by area and population, the other being the Republic of Ireland. Northern Ireland contains 27.1% of the total population and 16.75% of the total area of the island of Ireland.

The Belfast Metropolitan Area dominates in population terms, with over a third of the inhabitants of Northern Ireland.

When Northern Ireland was created, it had a Protestant majority of approximately two-to-one, unlike the Republic of Ireland, where Catholics were in the majority. The 2001 census was the first to show that the Protestant and other (non-Catholic) Christian share of the population had dropped below 50%, but 53.1% still identified as being from a Protestant or other Christian background. In the 2011 census, this dropped to 48.4%. In 2021, the recorded number of Catholics by background (45.7%) overtook the Protestant and other Christian by background share (43.48%), becoming the plurality, with no group in the overall majority.

Its people speak Ulster English which is itself heavily influenced by the Scots language of which Ulster Scots is a dialect, while a significant number speak Irish (Gaelic) or Ulster Scots. In addition the Ulster dialect of Irish (Gaelic) also has a closer connection to Scottish Gaelic than other Irish (Gaelic) dialects. This is both because of historic links with Scotland going back centuries, and because of settlements of lowland Scots Protestants in Ulster in the 17th century, such as the Plantation of Ulster.

Also unlike the Republic, a large proportion of people in Northern Ireland have a British national identity, although a significant minority identifies as Irish. Many people in Northern Ireland have a Northern Irish identity, whether in addition to a British or Irish identity or by itself.

Northern Ireland has the smallest proportion of people from minority ethnic (non-white) backgrounds of any part of the UK, with 3.4% of the population being from a minority ethnic group, compared to 18.3% in England and Wales and 12.9% in Scotland.

== Historic population trends ==
Population of Northern Ireland over time

Population census
Year	Pop.	±%
1841	1,648,945	—
1851	1,442,517	−12.5%
1861	1,396,453	−3.2%
1871	1,359,190	−2.7%
1881	1,304,816	−4.0%
1891	1,236,056	−5.3%
1901	1,236,952	+0.1%
1911	1,250,531	+1.1%
1926	1,256,561	+0.5%
1951	1,370,921	+9.1%
1961	1,425,042	+3.9%
1971	1,536,065	+7.8%
1981	1,543,000	+0.5%
1991	1,607,300	+4.2%
2001	1,685,267	+4.9%
2011	1,810,863	+7.5%
2021	1,903,175	+5.1%
2025	1,928,400	+1.3%
Note: 1981 and 1991 data are mid-year estimates. Data for years prior to 1926 are from the Census of Ireland, for those counties that became Northern Ireland in 1920.

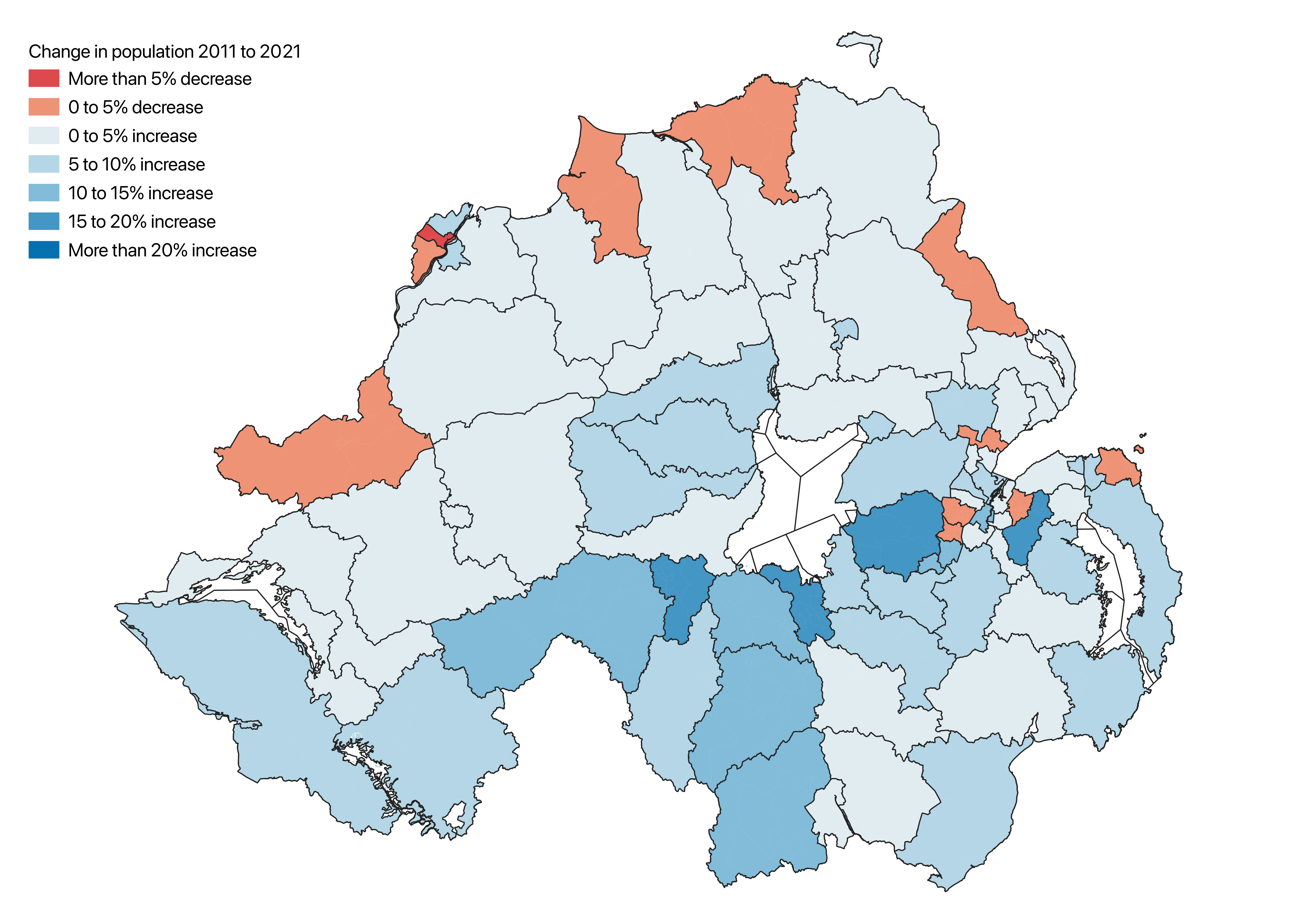
Population change by DEA between 2011 and 2021

Cities and towns by population
Belfast Derry	#	Settlement	Population	Metro population	Lisburn Newry
Belfast Derry	1	Belfast	293,300	626,339	Lisburn Newry
Belfast Derry	2	Derry	85,279	94,376	Lisburn Newry
Belfast Derry	3	Lisburn	51,447	84,090	Lisburn Newry
Belfast Derry	4	Craigavon Urban Area	72,301		Lisburn Newry
Belfast Derry	5	Metropolitan Newtonabbey	67,599		Lisburn Newry
Belfast Derry	6	Bangor	64,596		Lisburn Newry
Belfast Derry	7	Metropolitan Castlereagh	58,762		Lisburn Newry
Belfast Derry	8	Ballymena	31,205		Lisburn Newry
Belfast Derry	9	Newtownards	29,677		Lisburn Newry
Belfast Derry	10	Newry	28,530		Lisburn Newry
Belfast Derry	11	Carrickfergus	28,141		Lisburn Newry

=== Fertility ===
Fertility statistics

Percentage of births born outside of wedlock in Northern Ireland

Age of mother at birth in Northern Ireland

== Population density ==
Population density of Northern Ireland based on 2021 census

Northern Ireland's population density is 133 people per square kilometre – comparable to European countries such as Denmark and the Czech Republic. If Northern Ireland were a sovereign state, it would have the 16th-highest population density in Europe. It has a higher population density than Scotland (70 people per km^{2}), but less than England (434 per km^{2}) and Wales (153 per km^{2}).

Belfast is the most population-dense of the 11 local government districts at 2,617 per km^{2}, with the highest population (345,418) and least land area (133 km^{2}) of any district, and includes both Belfast City and much of the Metropolitan Castlereagh settlement (formerly part of the Castlereagh local government district before 2015).

Fermanagh and Omagh is the least dense district, with the lowest population (116,812) and greatest land area (2,836 km^{2}). It includes all of Northern Ireland's least-populous county, Fermanagh (except the townland of Killybane near Fivemiletown), and the largely rural former Omagh district.

The 217 wards with the highest population density which make up 50.2% of the population. They have a combined area of 460.1km^{2}, 3.3% of Northern Ireland's total area. Overlaid: railways (black), rail stations (yellow), motorways (blue), dual carriageways (green).

Of the 80 District Electoral Areas that make up the local government districts, Botanic in Belfast has the highest population density at 4,653 people per km^{2}, as well as being the most populous DEA (49,727 people in 2021). The DEA includes Belfast city centre, Queen's University, and much of the city's student population.

Erne West in Fermanagh and Omagh has the lowest population density of any DEA, with 20 people per km^{2}, as well as being the least populous DEA (14,661 people in 2021). Erne West is largely mountainous and separated from the rest of Northern Ireland by Lough Erne, with only a few roads around and over the lough. The largest settlement, Bellanaleck, a small village near Enniskillen, is home to only 714 people, and is apart from the other small villages spread through Erne West's large, narrow area.

The 216 contiguous wards with the highest population density, which make up 50.02% of the population. They have a combined area of 1,299km^{2}, 9.4% of Northern Ireland's total area. Overlaid: railways (black), rail stations (red), motorways (blue), dual carriageways (green).

Another way to show the majority of Northern Ireland's population is as a contiguous area centred on Belfast and nearby settlements (red) and the surrounding area (yellow). This highlights the concentration of Northern Ireland's population - and its road and rail infrastructure - around greater Belfast.

As of 2021, 50.2% of Northern Ireland's population lived in the 217 most population-dense electoral wards (around 47% of Northern Ireland's 462 wards). The 217 wards have an area of 460.1 km^{2}, 3.3% of Northern Ireland's total area. Of these 217 wards, 99 are a contiguous area covering most of Belfast, Castlereagh, Lisburn and Newtownabbey. These 217 wards are highlighted in red on the map.

These wards cover part or all of the 28 largest settlements in Northern Ireland, as well as Warrenpoint, Donaghadee, Ballynahinch, Moira, Maghera and Coalisland. The vast majority of these wards contain or are near a motorway, dual carriageway or train station. Considering this, the most remote wards are the Portora and Erne wards in Ennskillen, which are 30 miles from the A4 dual carriageway near Ballygawley.

Furthermore, 50.02% of Northern Ireland's population lived in the most population-dense contiguous area of 216 electoral wards. These 216 wards have an area of 1,299 km^{2}, 9.4% of Northern Ireland's total area. These 216 wards are highlighted in purple on the map. These wards cover part or all of the 10 largest settlements, and almost entirely track Northern Ireland's rail lines, motorways and dual carriageways. The exceptions are a spur towards Armagh city; and a string of villages between Ballymena and Limavady.

The electoral wards in Northern Ireland with the highest and lowest population density are listed in the table below:

No.	Electoral Ward (2012)	District Electoral Area (2012)	Local Government District (2012)	Electoral Ward population (2021)	Density (/km^{2})	Area (km^{2})
1	Ardoyne	Oldpark	Belfast	5,490	10,235.66	0.54
2	Woodstock	Titanic	Belfast	6,431	9,649.75	0.67
3	Windsor	Botanic	Belfast	11,302	8,183.80	1.38
4	Clonard	Court	Belfast	5,999	7,641.16	0.79
5	Bloomfield	Titanic	Belfast	5,894	7,224.94	0.82
6	Beersbridge	Titanic	Belfast	6,610	6,952.38	0.95
7	New Lodge	Oldpark	Belfast	4,881	6,815.49	0.72
8	Connswater	Titanic	Belfast	5,929	6,387.94	0.93
9	Ballymurphy	Black Mountain	Belfast	5,131	6,329.39	0.81
10	Beechmount	Black Mountain	Belfast	5,394	6,255.17	0.86
11	Woodvale	Court	Belfast	5,170	6,143.26	0.84
12	Ballymacarrett	Titanic	Belfast	5,905	5,972.05	0.99
13	Shankill	Court	Belfast	6,445	5,793.76	1.11
14	Fairview	Three Mile Water	Antrim and Newtownabbey	3,115	5,610.43	0.56
15	Central	Botanic	Belfast	15,446	5,497.58	2.81
16	Cregagh	Lisnasharragh	Belfast	4,587	5,418.46	0.85
17	Fortwilliam	Castle	Belfast	4,717	5,381.77	0.88
18	Shantallow	Ballyarnett	Derry City and Strabane	3,667	5,317.61	0.69
19	Silverstream	Bangor West	Ards and North Down	3,960	5,305.38	0.75
20	Rosetta	Lisnasharragh	Belfast	5,793	5,215.15	1.11
...	...	...	...	...	...	...
443	Derrylin	Erne West	Fermanagh and Omagh	2,794	26.45	105.65
444	Dunnamanagh	Sperrin	Derry City and Strabane	3,513	25.75	136.45
445	Fairy Water	West Tyrone	Fermanagh and Omagh	2,826	25.57	110.50
446	Boho, Cleenish and Letterbreen	Erne West	Fermanagh and Omagh	3,466	24.76	139.99
447	Dungiven	Benbradagh	Causeway Coast and Glens	3,297	24.44	134.88
448	Rosslea	Erne East	Fermanagh and Omagh	2,331	24.43	95.43
449	Magilligan	Limavady	Causeway Coast and Glens	3,481	24.00	145.01
450	Donagh	Erne East	Fermanagh and Omagh	2,527	23.17	109.06
451	Fivemiletown	Clogher Valley	Mid Ulster	3,174	21.34	148.76
452	Brookeborough	Erne East	Fermanagh and Omagh	2,579	20.88	123.50
453	Drumquin	West Tyrone	Fermanagh and Omagh	2,910	18.38	158.31
454	Derrygonnelly	Erne West	Fermanagh and Omagh	2,898	18.00	160.98
455	Slemish	Braid	Mid and East Antrim	3,207	17.90	179.17
456	Florence Court and Kinawley	Erne West	Fermanagh and Omagh	2,883	17.61	163.75
457	Belleek and Boa	Erne North	Fermanagh and Omagh	3,123	15.94	195.90
458	Glenderg	Derg	Derry City and Strabane	3,200	15.09	212.05
459	Owenkillew	Mid Tyrone	Fermanagh and Omagh	2,698	14.40	187.30
460	Torr Head and Rathlin	The Glens	Causeway Coast and Glens	3,597	14.21	253.11
461	Glenelly Valley	Sperrin	Derry City and Strabane	3,403	13.25	256.90
462	Belcoo and Garrison	Erne West	Fermanagh and Omagh	2,644	13.07	202.26

== Place of birth ==
Place of birth by age group

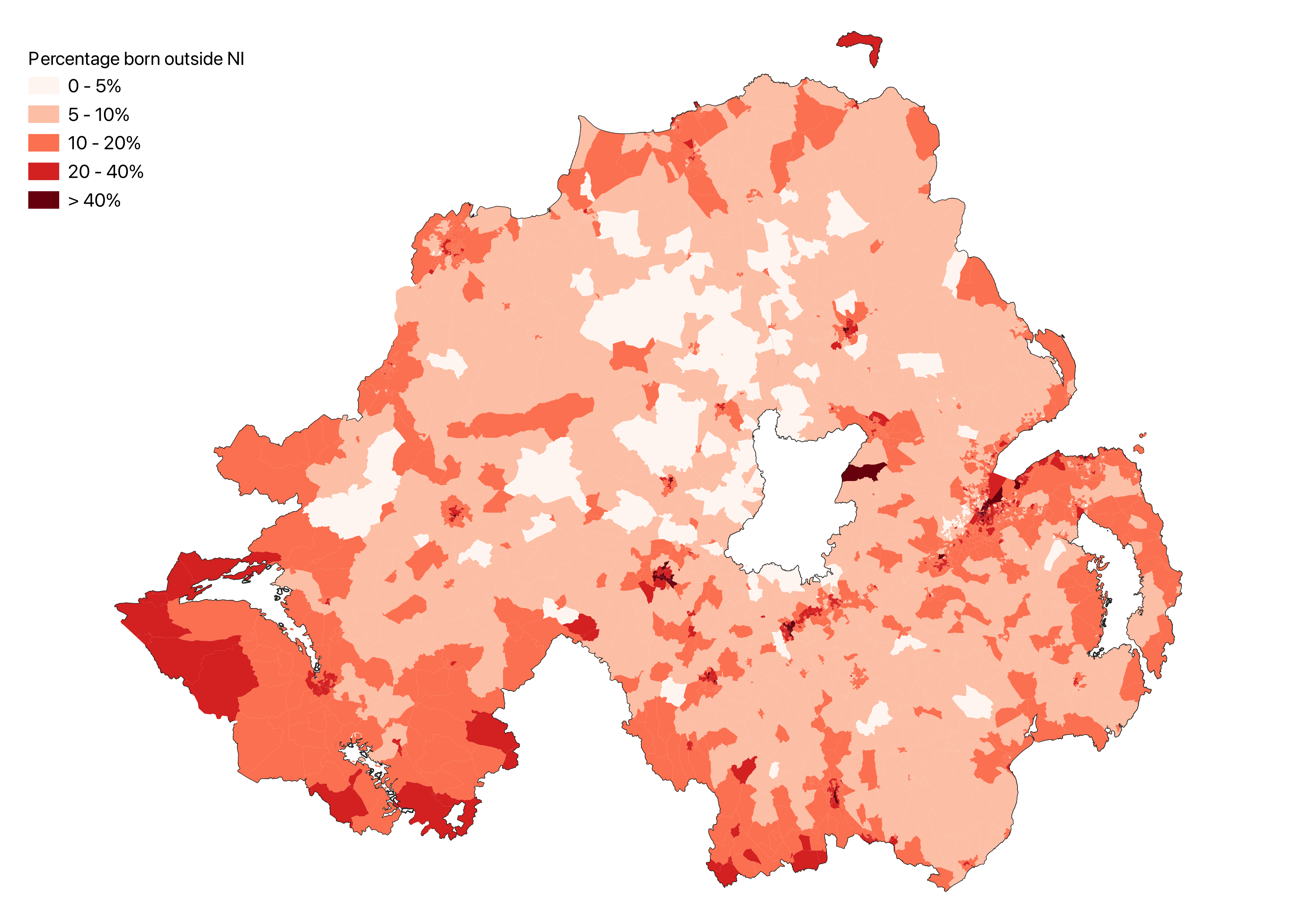
Map showing the percentage of the population born outside Northern Ireland according to the 2021 census.

In 2001, 91.0% of the population were born in Northern Ireland, 7.2% were born in other parts of the UK and Ireland, and 1.8% were born elsewhere. By 2021, the proportion of immigrants from outside the UK and Ireland had risen to 6.6%, while the proportion born within other parts of the UK and Ireland had fallen to 6.9%. The highest number of non-British/Irish immigrants are in Belfast City Council, followed by Armagh City, Banbridge and Craigavon Borough Council and Mid Ulster District Council. The town of Dungannon in Mid Ulster District Council has a bigger share of immigrants than any town in Northern Ireland, while Derry City and Strabane has the smallest share of immigrants.

Place of Birth	2001		2011		2021	
Place of Birth	Number	%	Number	%	Number	%
Northern Ireland	1,534,268	91.04	1,608,853	88.84	1,646,276	86.50%
England	61,609	3.66	64,717	3.57	72,940	3.83%
Scotland	16,772	1.00	15,455	0.85	16,521	0.87%
Wales	3,008	0.18	2,552	0.14	2,796	0.15%
Republic of Ireland	39,051	2.32	37,833	2.09	40,357	2.12%
Other European Union member countries	10,355	0.61			67,451	3.54%
— Member countries prior to 2004 expansion			9,703	0.54		
— Accession countries 2004 onwards			35,704	1.97		
Other outside the EU	20,204	1.20	36,046	1.99	57,012	2.99%
Europe					3,689	0.19%
Africa					10,761	0.57%
Middle East and Asia					29,241	1.54%
North, Central America and Caribbean					8,207	0.43%
South America					1,858	0.10%
Oceania and other					3,076	0.16%
Total	1,685,267	100.00	1,810,863	100.00	1,903,173	100%

Below are the 5 largest foreign-born groups in Northern Ireland according to 2014 ONS estimates.

Country of birth	Estimated population, 2013	Estimated population, 2014	Estimated population, 2015
Poland	25,000	20,000	18,000
Lithuania	7,000	8,000	13,000
India	8,000	6,000	6,000
Philippines	3,000	4,000	5,000

== Emigration ==
Detailed statistic on births are available between 1887 and 2022 in Birth tables and deaths between 1955 and 2022 in Death tables

Using deaths and births between 1955 and 2021, and the number of those from the 2021 census whose country of birth is Northern Ireland, we can estimate emigration for those aged under 66 by subtracting the total of the number of deaths and the number of those born in Northern Ireland who are still living there.

Northern Irish emigration estimates
	All ages	18-66 year olds
Births 1955-2021	1,801,552	1,353,624
Deaths 1955-2021 among those born 1955-2021	78,914	76,226
Country of birth is Northern Ireland in 2021 Census, ages 0–66	1,389,081	965,538
Estimated Emigration	333,557	311,860
Estimated Emigration as a percentage of births	18.5%	23.0%

This gives an estimate of 18.5% of all people born since 1955 have emigrated, or 23% of adults aged 18–66. This is an estimate of the minimum amount of emigration, since deaths are not broken down by country of birth, so some of those will not have been born in Northern Ireland. Most deaths occur in the over 50 and currently about 12.5% of those aged 50 and over were born outside Northern Ireland. Adjusting the number of deaths downwards by 12.5%, we can estimate an emigration rate of 18.5 to 19% for all ages, and 23.0% to 23.7% for adults aged 18–66.

Doing the same analysis by age shows that this is consistent with the actual number of those born in Northern Ireland from the 2021 England/Wales census, where about 40% of emigrants have settled in England or Wales.

Emigration from Northern Ireland by Age

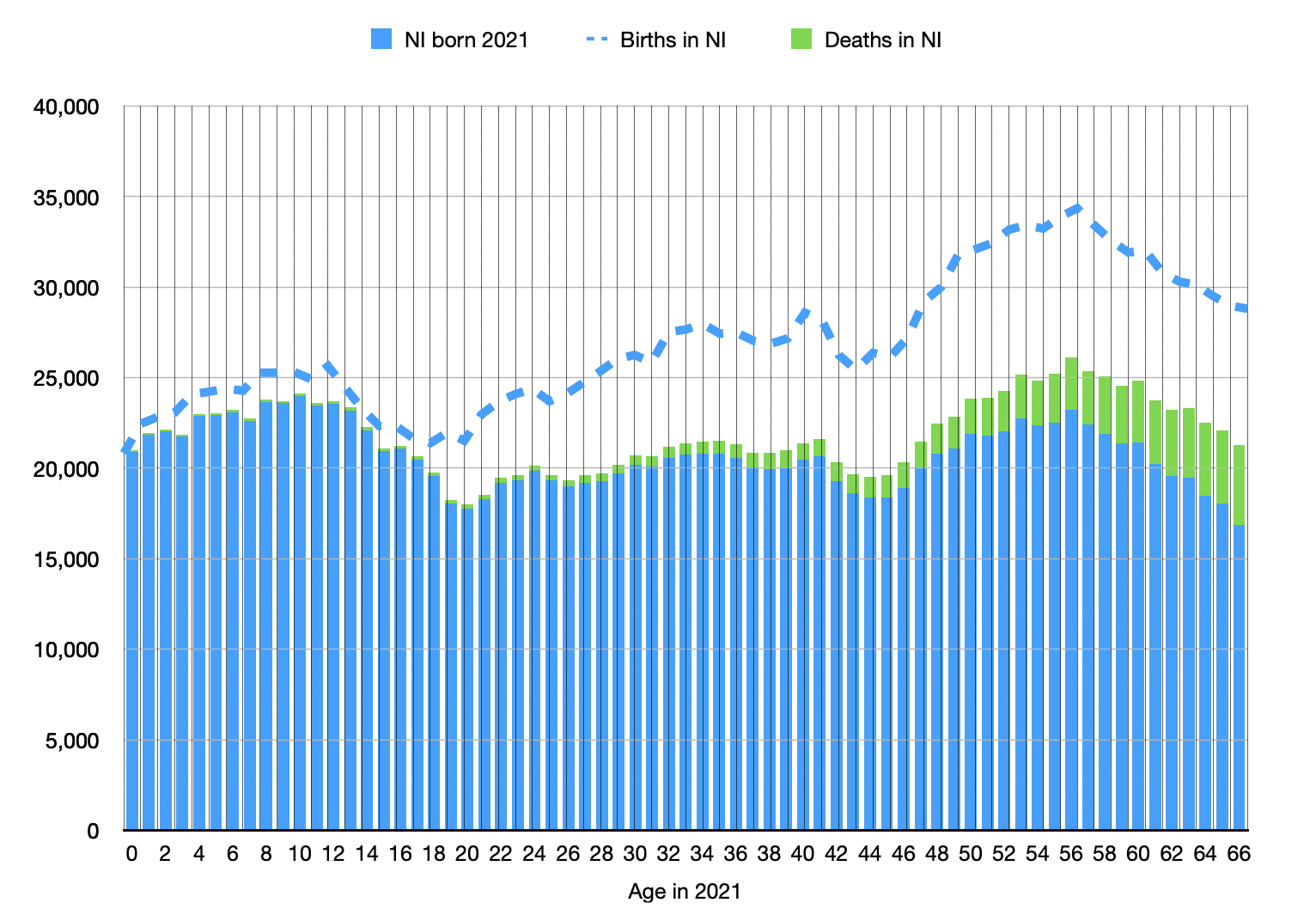
Births, deaths, and Northern Ireland-born living in Northern Ireland

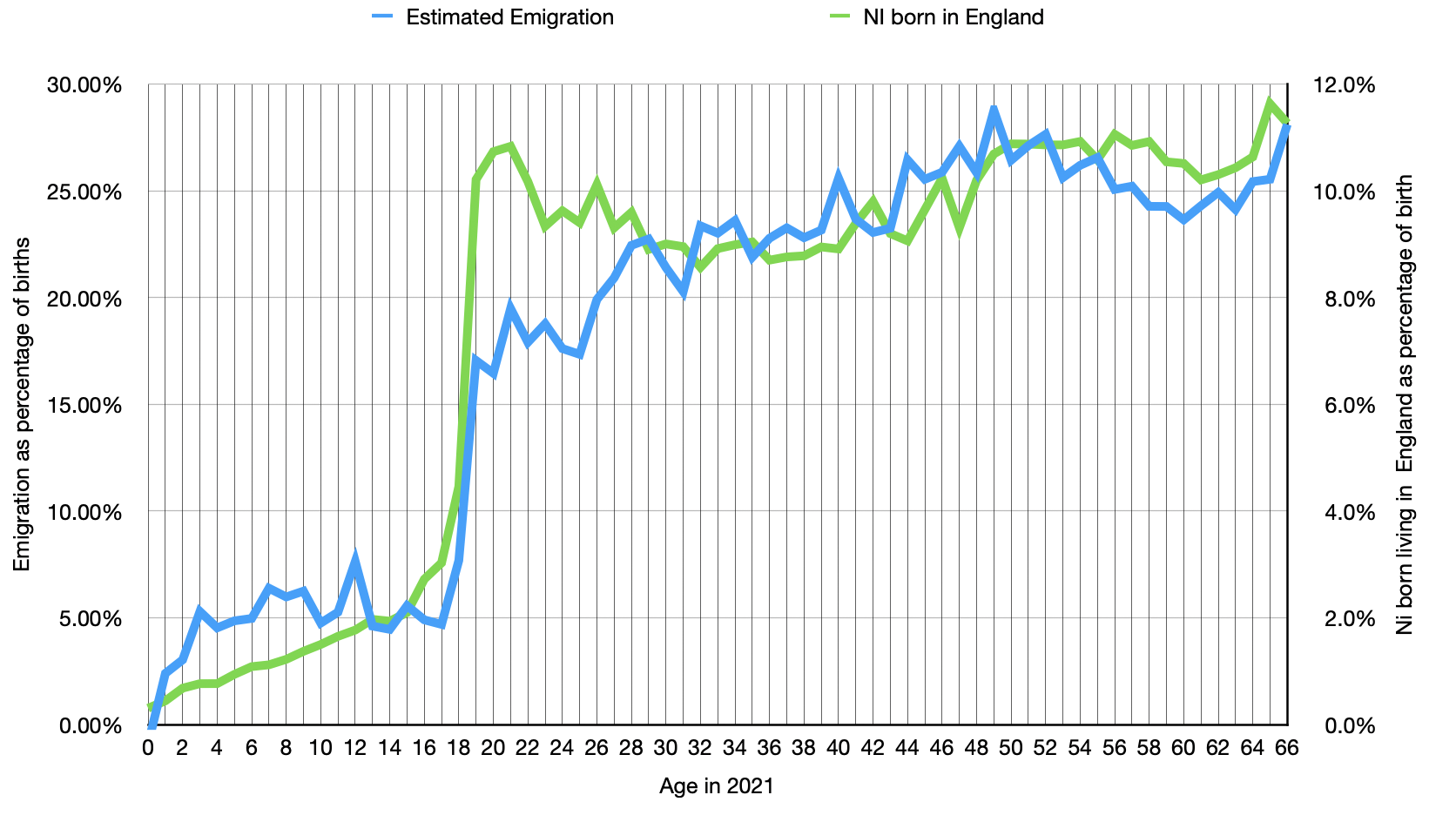
Estimated emigration as percentage of births, compared to Northern Ireland-born living in England as a percentage of births

Below are the numbers of Northern Ireland born living outside Northern Ireland from the most recent censuses for England, Wales, Scotland, Ireland, Australia, and New Zealand.

Northern Irish emigration to other countries
	0-17 year olds	18-34 year olds	34-65 year olds	65+ year olds	Total
England	5,730	37,193	87, 245	60,362	190, 534
Scotland	1,354	10,061	18,029	7,817	37,260
Wales	273	1,541	3,471	2,521	7,806
Total UK	7,357	48,795	108,745	70,700	235,600
Ireland	48,388			13,362	61,750
Australia	3,293		10,244	9,450	22,995
Total	226,733			93,512	320,245
New Zealand					4,806
Based on 2.7% of UK emigration
United States	693,465 UK emigrants				18,700
Canada	464,135 UK emigrants				12,500
EU (excluding Ireland)	994,000 UK emigrants				26,800
Total	Estimated from 2.7% of UK figures				58,000

Numbers for other countries are not available for the individual countries that make up the UK, so it is not possible to accurately determine the number living in the US, Canada, or the EU (excluding Ireland). The numbers estimated from total UK emigrants are included in the above table but not included in the total.

Of those born in Northern Ireland and aged between 16 and 24, 64% living in England and 72% living in Scotland are full-time students.

== Ethnicity ==
Whereas a question on ethnic group was asked in Great Britain from 1991, it was in 2001 that the Northern Ireland census first asked about ethnicity.

Northern Ireland ethnic demography

Ethnic demography of Northern Ireland from 2001 to 2021

Population pyramid of Northern Ireland by ethnicity in 2021

The following table shows the ethnic group of respondents for the following censuses

Ethnic group	1991 estimates		2001		2011		2021	
Ethnic group	Number	%	Number	%	Number	%	Number	%
White: Total	–	99.8%	1,672,698	99.25%	1,779,750	98.28%	1,841,713	96.76%
White	–	–	1,670,988	99.15%	1,778,449	98.21%	–	–
White: British/Irish/Northern Irish only (national identity) and Christian/no religion/religion not stated (religion)	–	–	–	–	–	–	1,749,970	91.9%
White: Other	–	–	–	–	–	–	87,607	4.6%
White: Irish Traveller/White Gypsy	–	–	1,710	0.10%	1,301	0.07%	2,609	0.14%
White: Roma	–	–	–	–	–	–	1,529	0.08%
Asian or Asian British: Total	–	–	6,824	0.40%	19,130	1.06%	30,667	1.61%
Asian/Asian British: Indian	–	–	1,567	0.09%	6,198	0.34%	9,881	0.52%
Asian/Asian British: Pakistani	–	–	668	0.04%	1,091	0.06%	1,596	0.08%
Asian/Asian British: Bangladeshi	–	–	252	0.01%	540	0.03%	710	0.04%
Asian/Asian British: Chinese	–	–	4,145	0.25%	6,303	0.35%	9,495	0.50%
Asian/Asian British: Filipino (Note: New category for the 2021 census)	–	–	–	–	2,053	0.11%	4,451	0.23%
Asian/Asian British: Other Asian	–	–	194	0.01%	2,671	0.15%	4,534	0.24%
Black or Black British: Total	–	–	1,136	0.07%	3,616	0.20%	11,032	0.58%
Black or Black British: Caribbean	–	–	255	0.02%	372	0.02%	–	–
Black or Black British: African	–	–	494	0.03%	2,345	0.13%	8,069	0.42%
Black or Black British: Other	–	–	387	0.02%	899	0.05%	2,963	0.16%
Mixed: Total	–	–	3,319	0.20%	6,014	0.33%	14,382	0.76%
Other: Any other ethnic group:Total	–	–	1,290	0.08%	2,353	0.13%	5,385	0.29%
Other: Arab (Note: Categorised within 'Other Asian' in the 2011 census)	–	–	–	–	274	0.02%	1,817	0.10%
Other: Any other ethnic group	–	–	–	–	–	–	3,568	0.19%
Total	–	100%	1,685,267	100%	1,810,863	100%	1,903,179	100%

Population pyramids of ethnic groups within Northern Ireland in 2021

White

White British and Irish

White Other

Ethnic minorities

Mixed

== Languages spoken ==
English is the most commonly spoken language in Northern Ireland. The Irish language has official status and is, along with Ulster Scots, also protected under the European Charter for Regional or Minority Languages. Several other languages are spoken by immigrants to Northern Ireland, the most common of which is Polish.

A question about knowledge of Irish was reintroduced to the census in 1991, for the first time since 1911. In 2011, the census question was modified to ask about Ulster Scots alongside Irish.

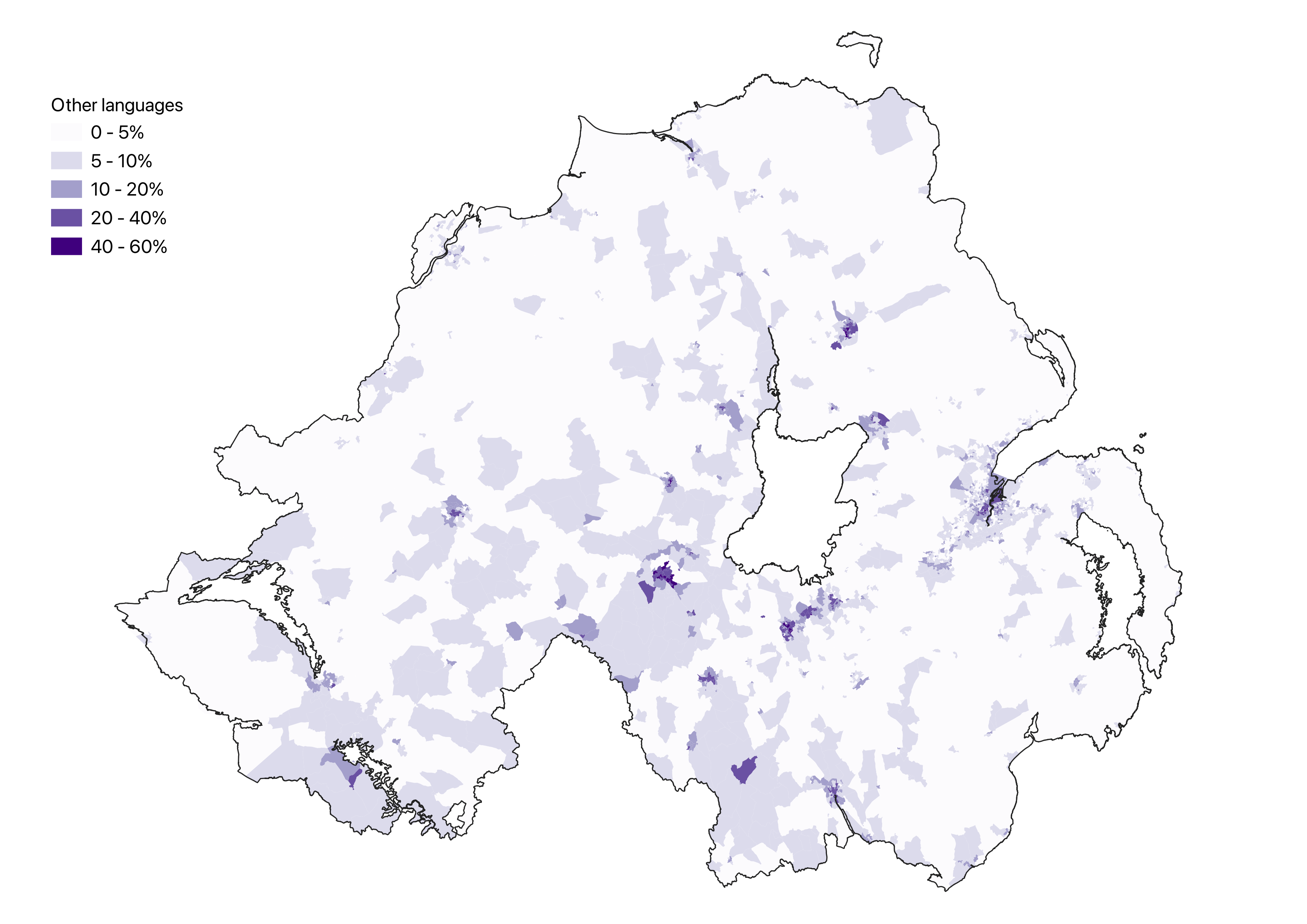
Foreign languages. Map showing the percentage of people whose main language was other than English or Irish (Gaeilge) in the 2021 census. Those stating Ulster Scots as their main language were negligible in number and not analysed geographically by NISRA.

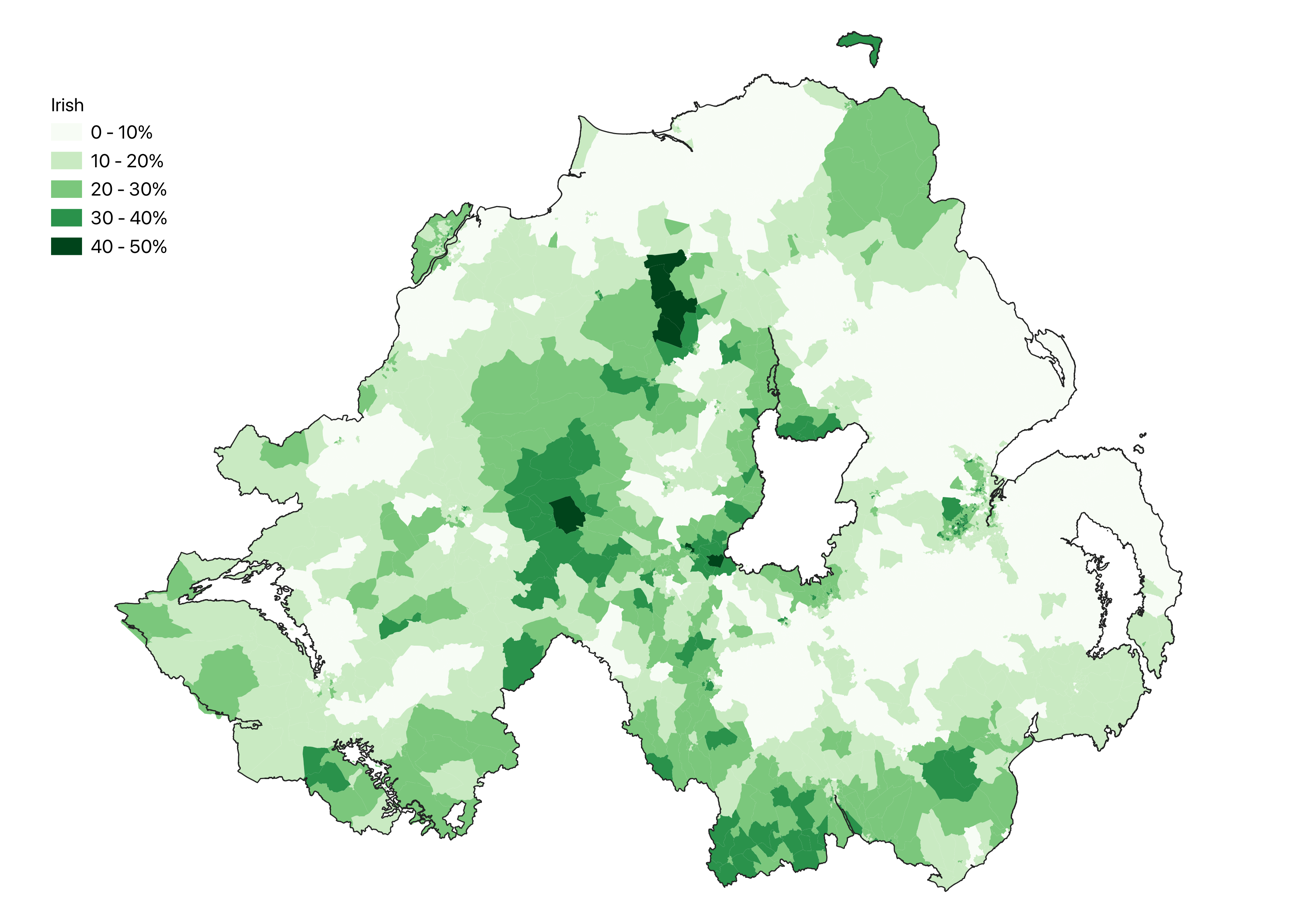
Percentage of people aged 3+ claiming to have some ability in Irish in the 2021 census

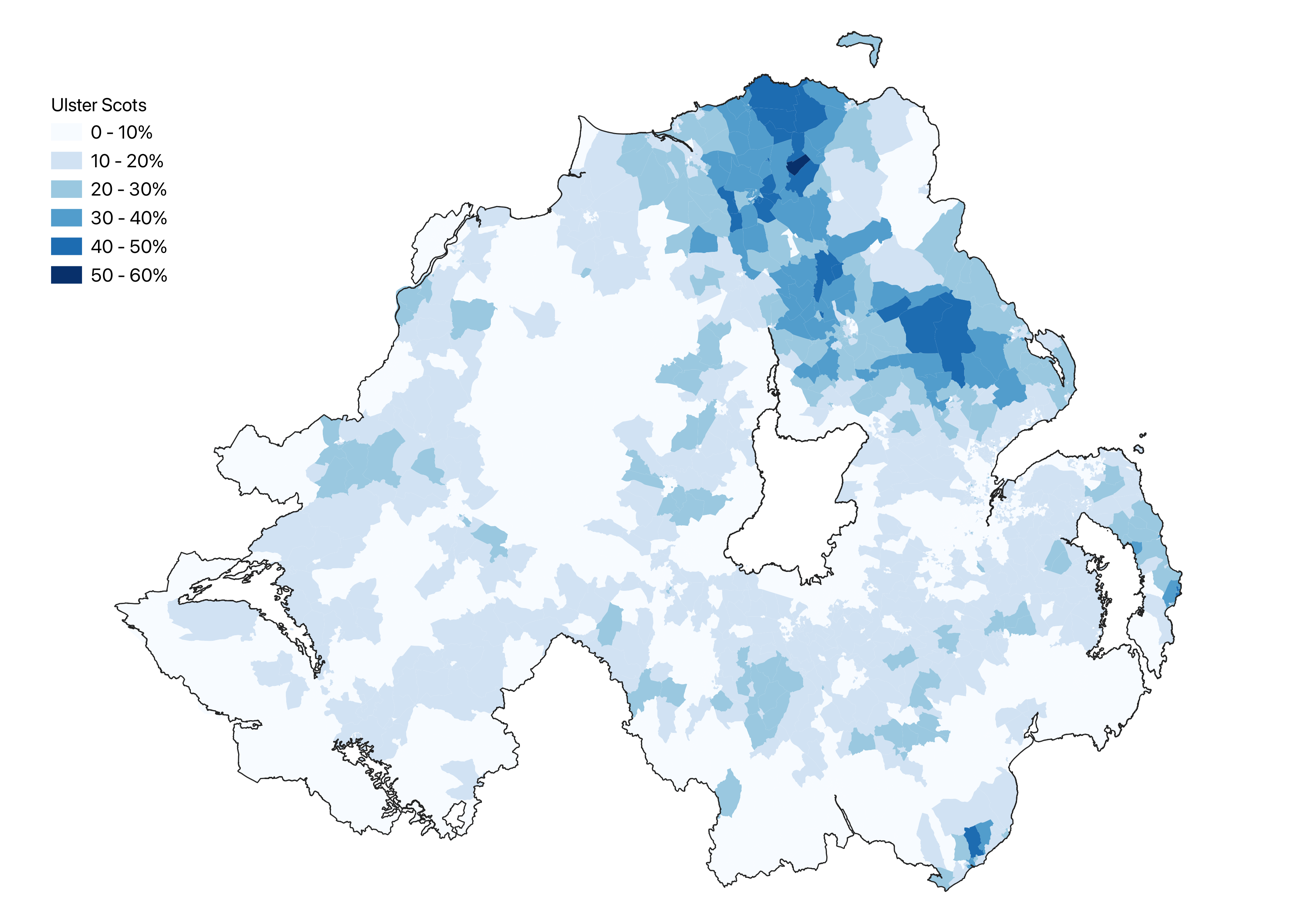
Percentage of people aged 3+ claiming to have some ability in Ulster Scots in the 2021 census

Main language of all usual residents aged 3 and over

Main language	2011		2021	
Main language	Usual residents aged 3+	Proportion	Usual residents aged 3+	Proportion
English	1,681,171	96.86%	1,751,510	95.37%
Polish	17,731	1.02%	20,134	1.10%
Lithuanian	6,250	0.36%	8,978	0.49%
Irish	4,164	0.24%	5,969	0.32%
Portuguese	2,293	0.13%	4,982	0.27%
Slovak	2,257	0.13%	2,333	0.13%
Chinese	2,214	0.13%	3,329	0.18%
Tagalog/Filipino	1,895	0.11%	1,339	0.07%
Latvian	1,273	0.07%	1,700	0.09%
Russian	1,191	0.07%	1,605	0.09%
Hungarian	1,008	0.06%	2,172	0.12%
Other	13,090	0.75%	28,293	1.5%
Total			1,836,616	100%

Ability in Irish of all usual residents aged 3 and over in the Census

Ability in Irish	2001		2011		2021	
Ability in Irish	Usual residents aged 3+	Proportion	Usual residents aged 3+	Proportion	Usual residents aged 3+	Proportion
Understands spoken Irish, but cannot speak, read, or write	36,479	2.25%	70,501	4.06%	90,801	4.94%
Can speak but cannot read or write Irish	24,536	1.52%	24,677	1.43%	37,497	2.04%
Can speak and read but cannot write Irish	7,183	0.44%	7,414	0.43%	9,683	0.53%
Can speak, read, write, and understand Irish	75,125	4.64%	64,847	3.74%	71,872	3.91%
Other combination of skills	24,167	1.49%	17,459	1.01%	18,764	1.02%
Has some knowledge of Irish	167,490	10.35%	184,898	10.65%	228,617	12.45%

Ability in Ulster Scots of all usual residents aged 3 and over in the Census

Ability in Ulster Scots	2011		2021	
Ability in Ulster Scots	Usual residents aged 3+	Proportion	Usual residents aged 3+	Proportion
Understands spoken Ulster Scots, but cannot speak, read, or write	92,040	5.30%	115,088	6.27%
Can speak but cannot read or write Ulster Scots	10,265	0.59%	26,570	1.45%
Can speak and read but cannot write Ulster Scots	7,801	0.45%	12,297	0.67%
Can speak, read, write, and understand Ulster Scots	16,373	0.94%	20,930	1.14%
Other combination of skills	13,725	0.79%	15,728	0.86%
Has some knowledge of Ulster Scots	140,204	8.08%	190,613	10.38%

== Education ==
Northern Ireland has a highly educated and literate population, particularly among the younger generations.

The following shows the educational attainment, shown by highest qualification received, at different ages for adults, in the 2021 census

Highest Qualification received - Level 1 to Level 4

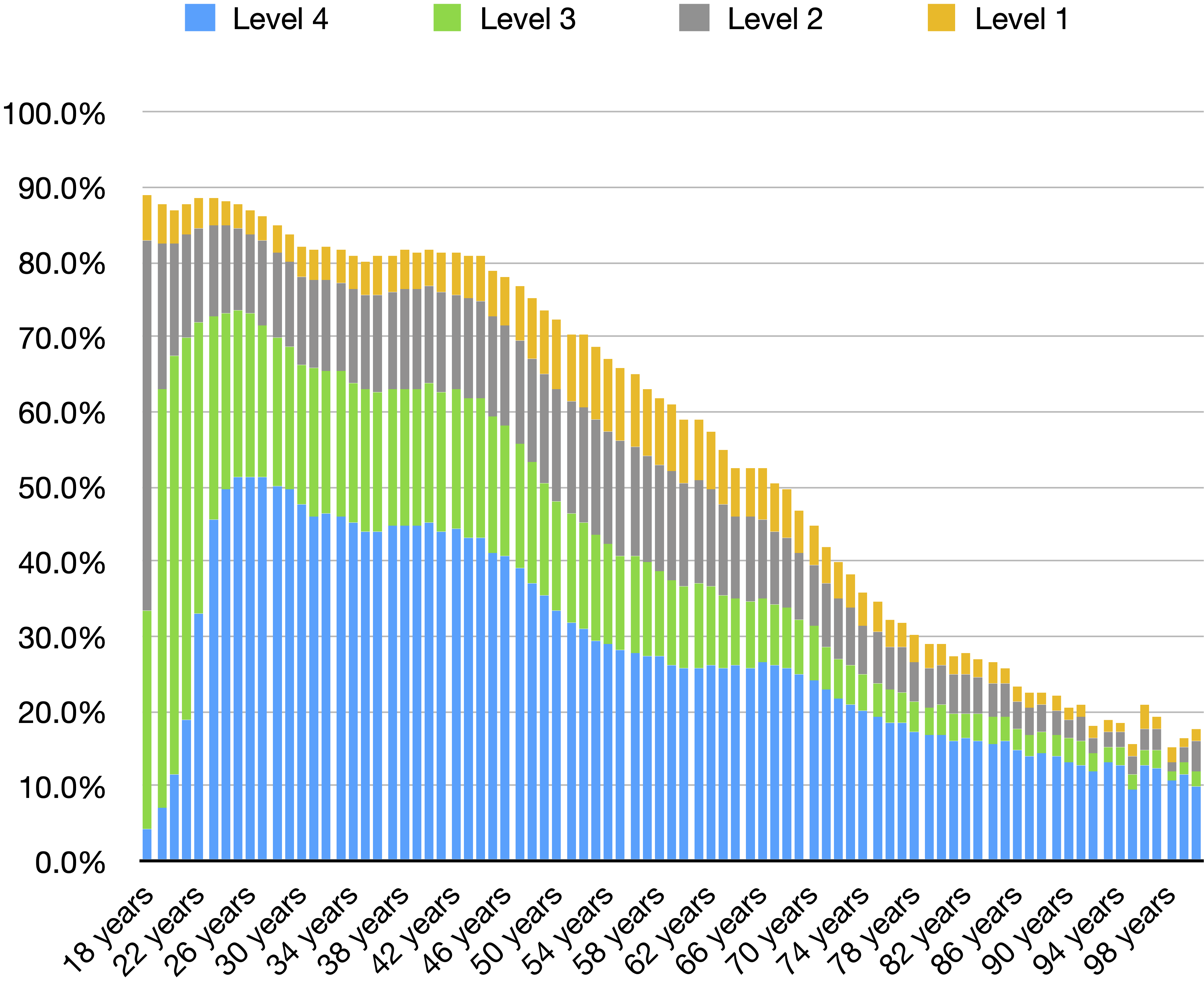
Highest qualification received by age

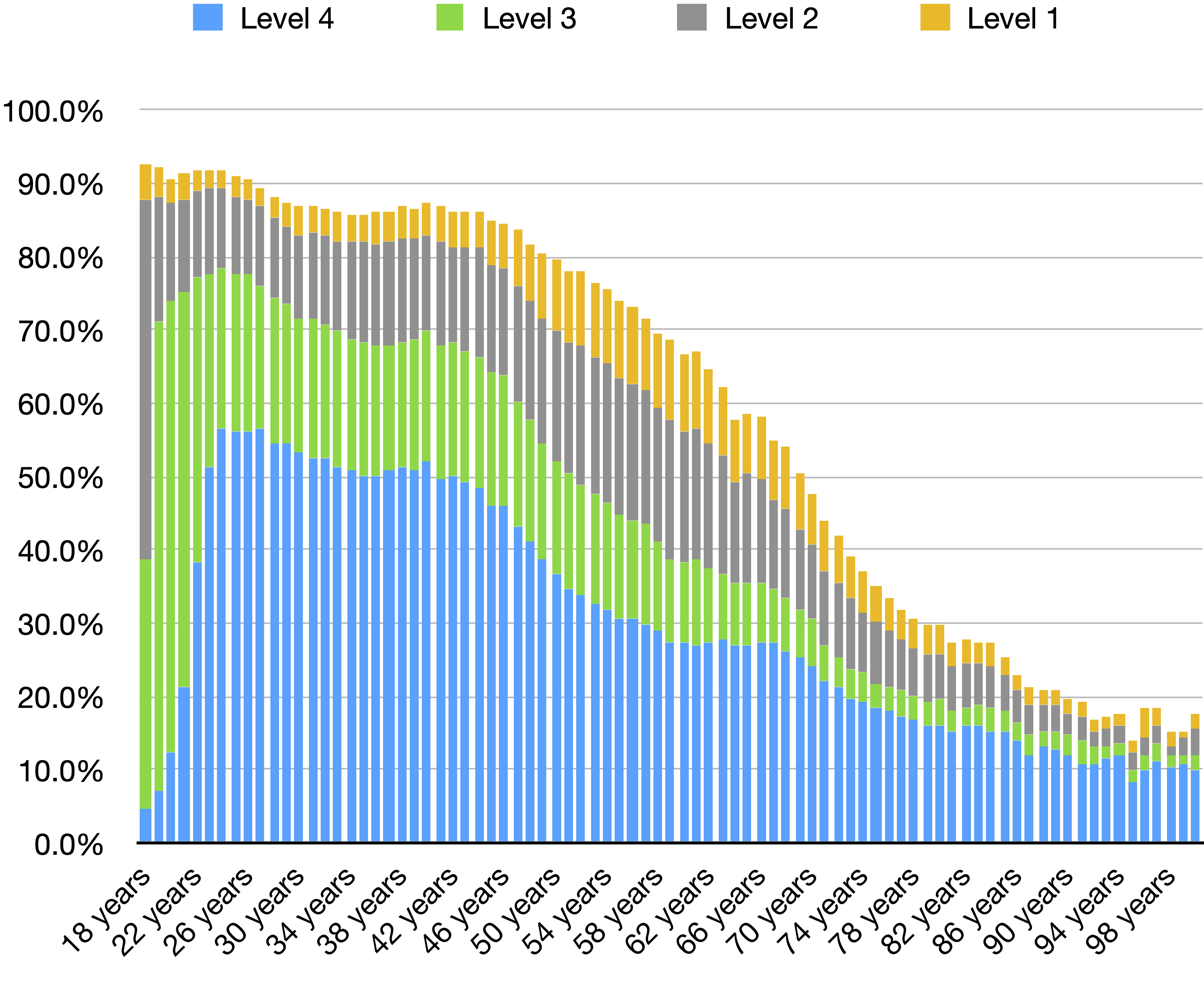
Female highest qualifications by age

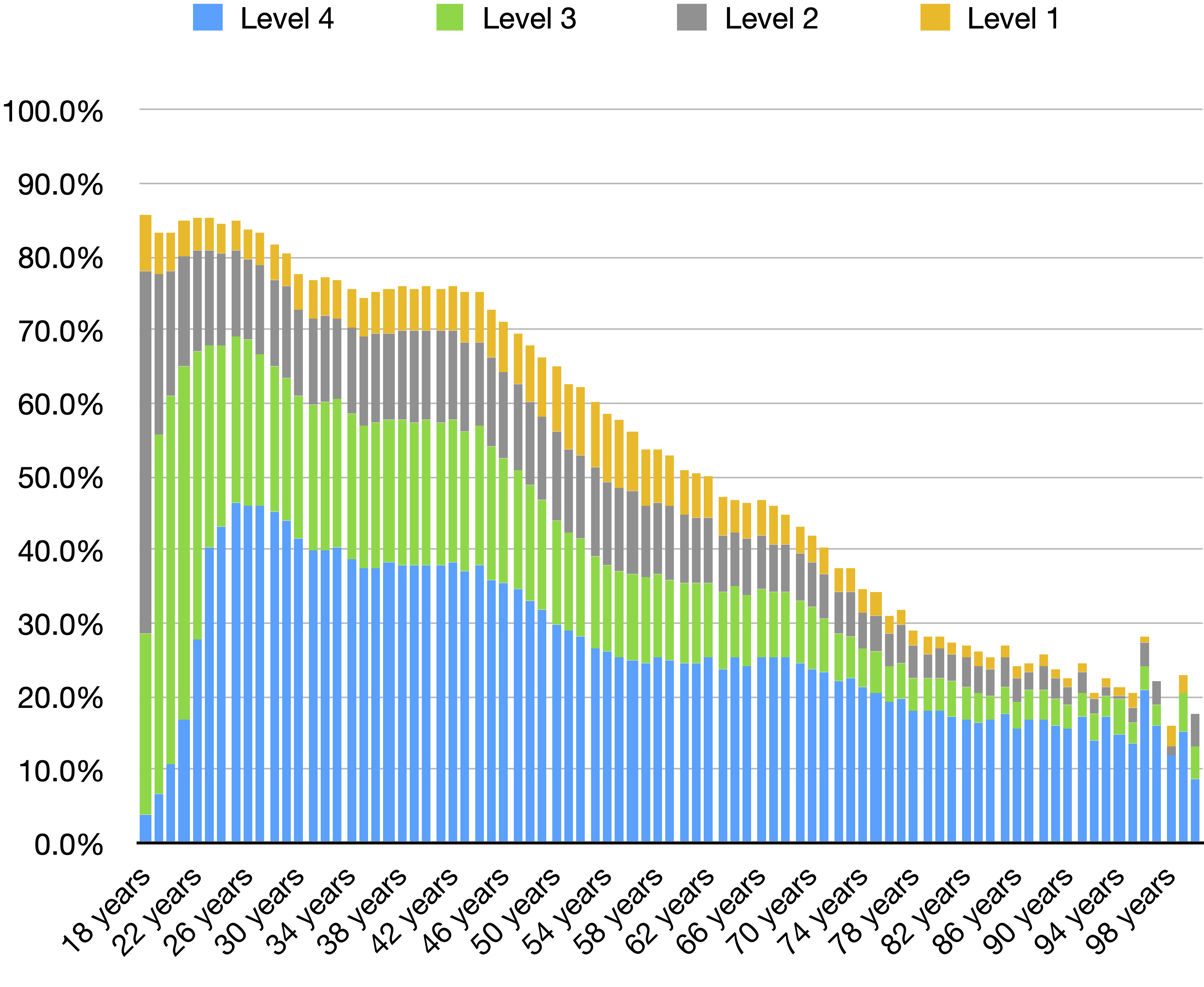
Male highest qualifications received by age
Apprenticeships and No qualifications

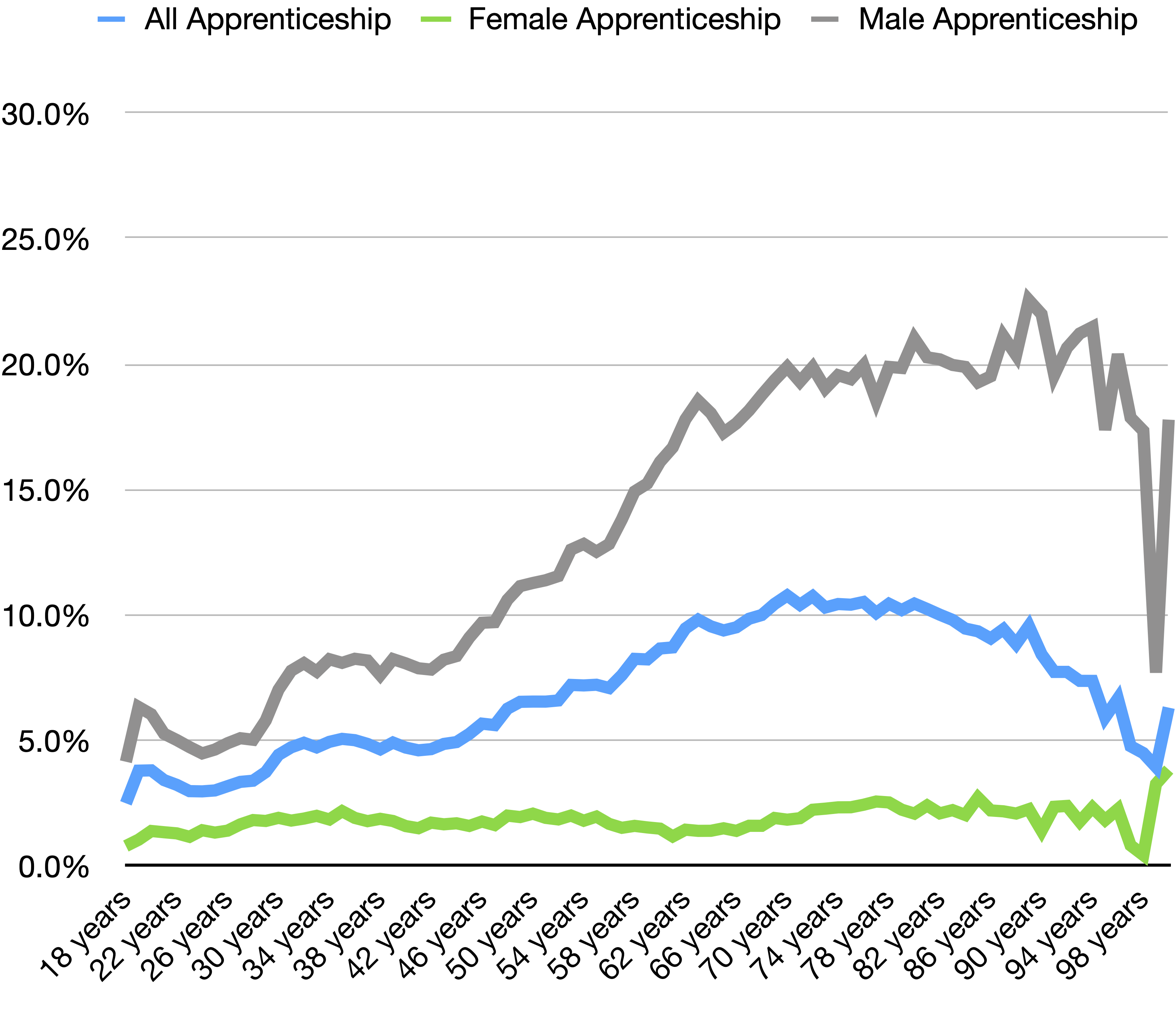
Apprenticeships by age

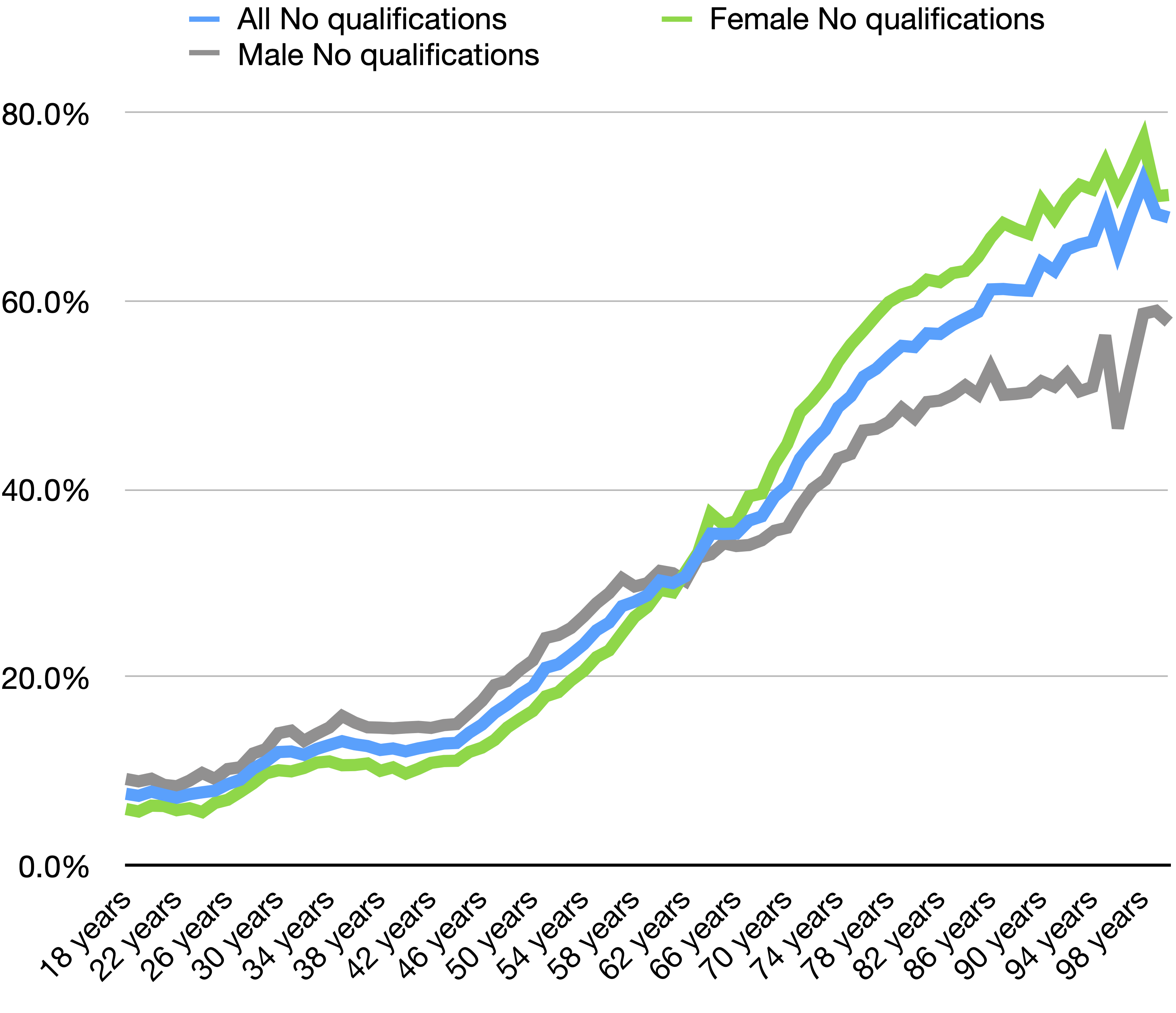
No qualifications by age

The census defines the levels as follows:

- Level 1: 1 to 4 GCSEs, O levels, CSEs (any grades); 1 AS Level; NVQ level 1; or equivalent
- Level 2: 5 or more GCSEs (A*-C or 9–4), O levels (passes) CSEs (grade 1); 1 A level, 2-3 AS Levels; NVQ level 2, BTEC General, City and Guilds Craft; or equivalent
- Level 3: 2 or more A Levels, 4 or more AS Levels; NVQ Level 3, BTEC National, OND, ONC, City and Guilds Advanced Craft; or equivalent
- Level 4: Degree (BA, BSc), foundation degree, NVQ Level 4 and above, HND, HNC, professional qualifications (teaching or nursing, for example), or equivalent
- Other: Other qualifications, equivalent unknown

Younger adults, aged 18–30, are the highest ever qualified group. Just under 50% of that age group who have reached university graduation age (around 23 years old) have achieved a Level 4 or above qualification. This is about 10% higher than those aged 30–40. The number of those without qualifications is the lowest in 18-30 group.

There is a large gender gap with 10% more females than males receiving Level 4 or above qualification. About 55% of women in their 20s have achieved Level 4.

The number of young adults with no qualifications is less than 8%, compared to an overall 23.8%. There has been a decrease in the number of people with apprenticeships from about 20% of males over 70 to only 5% for 20-30 year olds.

Overall educational attainment
	Level 4	Level 3	Level 2	Level 1	Apprenticeship	Other	No Qualifications
Female	35.0%	15.7%	15.0%	6.0%	1.7%	2.7%	23.9%
Male	29.1%	16.2%	12.2%	5.8%	11.3%	1.7%	23.7%
All residents NI	32.1%	16.0%	13.6%	5.9%	6.4%	2.2%	23.8%
All residents England and Wales	34.7%	17.3%	12.3%	9.6%	5.4%	2.8%	17.9%
20-30 year olds NI	41.7%	29.4%	12.2%	3.7%	3.3%	1.2%	8.5%
20-30 year olds England/Wales	40.1%	28.4%	11.7%	6.9%	4.4%	1.5%	7.0%

Compared to the UK regions in England and Wales, Northern Ireland has one of the highest percentages of those with a Level 4 qualification, with only London and southern England regions higher. However it also has the highest proportion of people with no qualifications. This is not entirely due to higher numbers of older people without qualifications. Even among the younger, more qualified, NI residents, Northern Ireland has the highest proportion of people with no qualifications.

Northern Ireland compared to UK regions

Percentage of people with degree-level qualifications in England and Wales compared to Northern Ireland.

Percentage of people with no qualifications in England and Wales compared to Northern Ireland.

=== Past censuses ===
Questions about the highest academic qualification received has been asked since the 1991 census. The categorization of results has changed since 1991, but each prior census can be mapped to 2021 categories.

Apprenticeships were not tracked as separate categories in 1991 or 2001 and it is not certain whether they were counted as "No Qualifications". About 10% of those over 50 reported holding an apprenticeship in 2021. Currently apprenticeships have a large academic component, and are separated into "Intermediate", "Advanced," and "Higher" apprenticeships, and so are included as academic qualifications.

Mapping the past results to the 2021 categories shows that the number of people with no qualifications has dropped considerably in each census, whereas the number of people with degrees or equivalent is nearly 4 times larger than in 1991.

Educational attainment in past censuses
	Level 4	Level 3	Level 2	Level 1	Apprenticeship	Other	No Qualifications
1991	8.2%	7.2%	16.2%	3.5%	-	-	65.0%
2001	15.8%	9.0%	16.4%	17.2%	-	-	41.6%
2011	23.7%	12.3%	14.9%	11.5%	4.2%	4.3%	29.2%
2021	32.1%	16.0%	13.6%	5.9%	6.4%	2.2%	23.8%

== Religion ==
Religious Background, in 2021

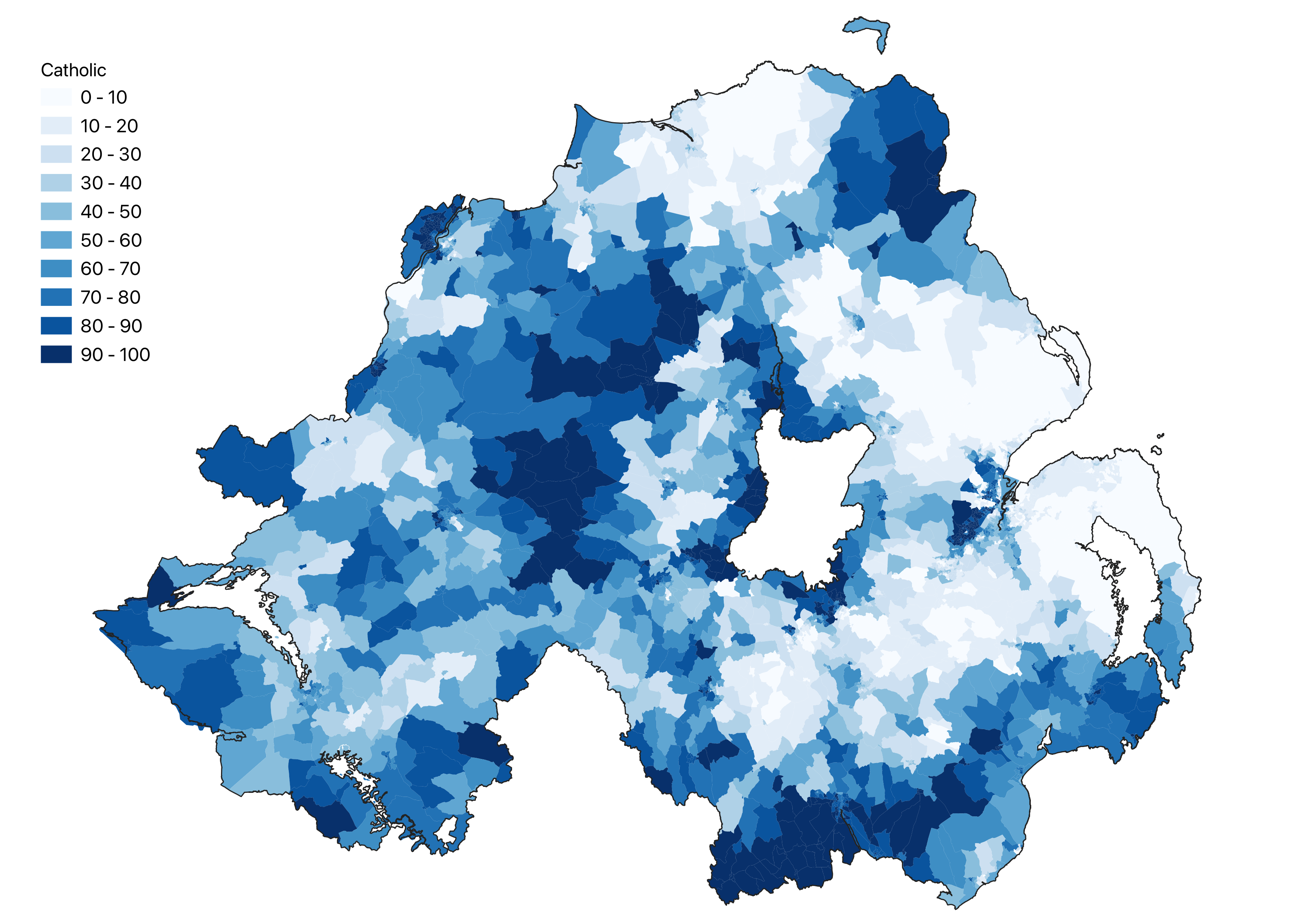
Percentage of population whose Religious Background is Catholic

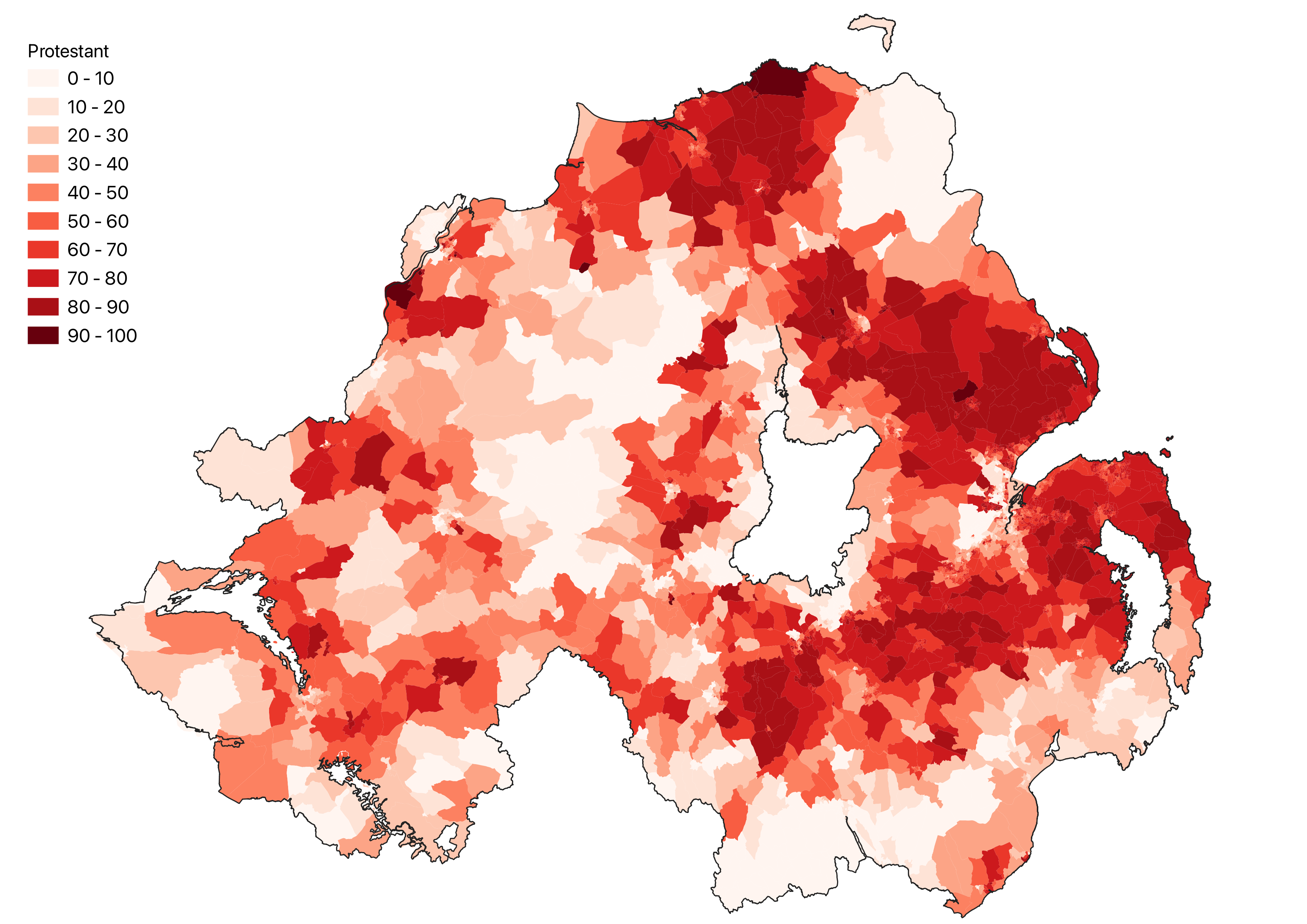
Percentage of population whose Religious Background is Protestant

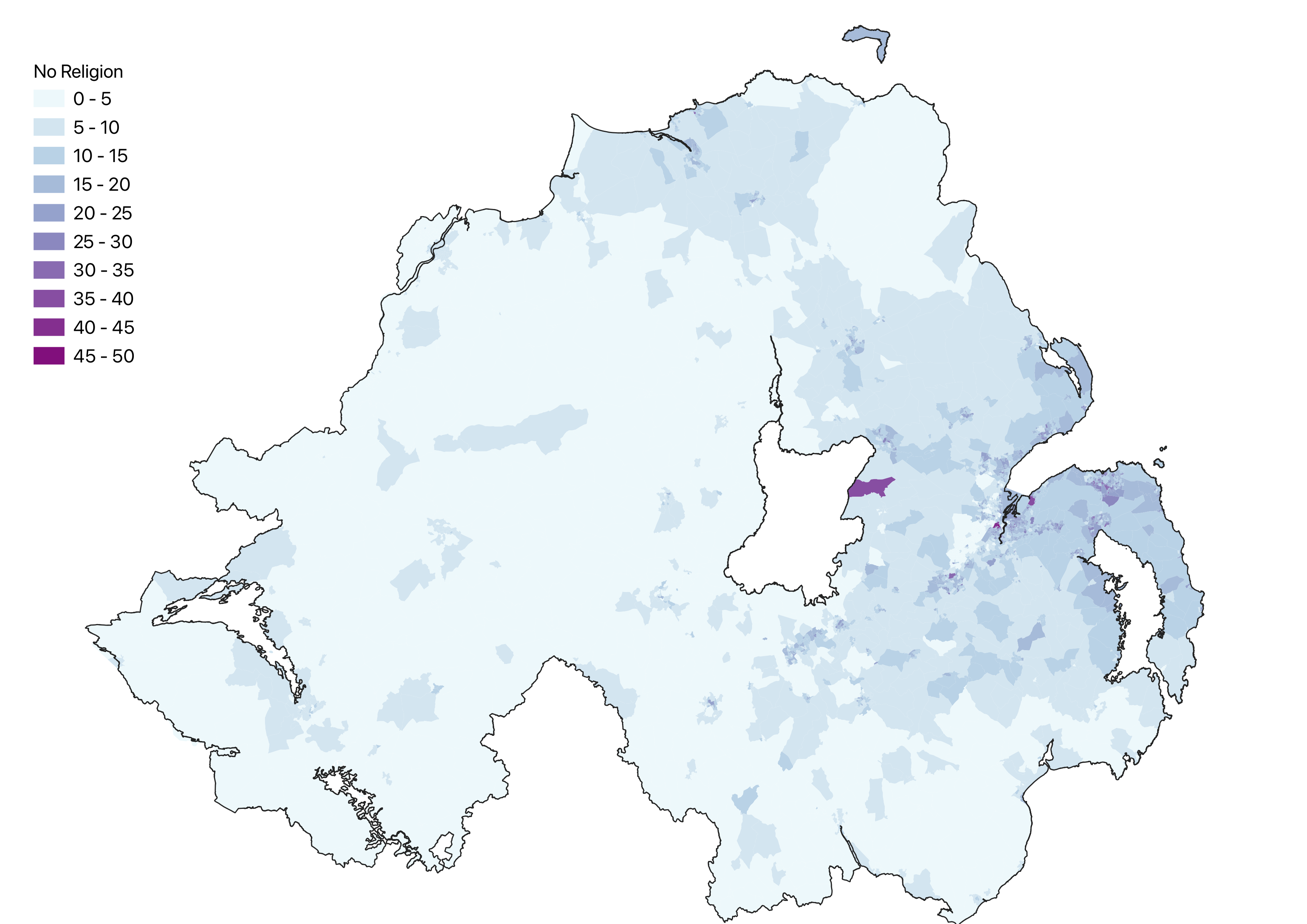
Percentage of population who profess no religion

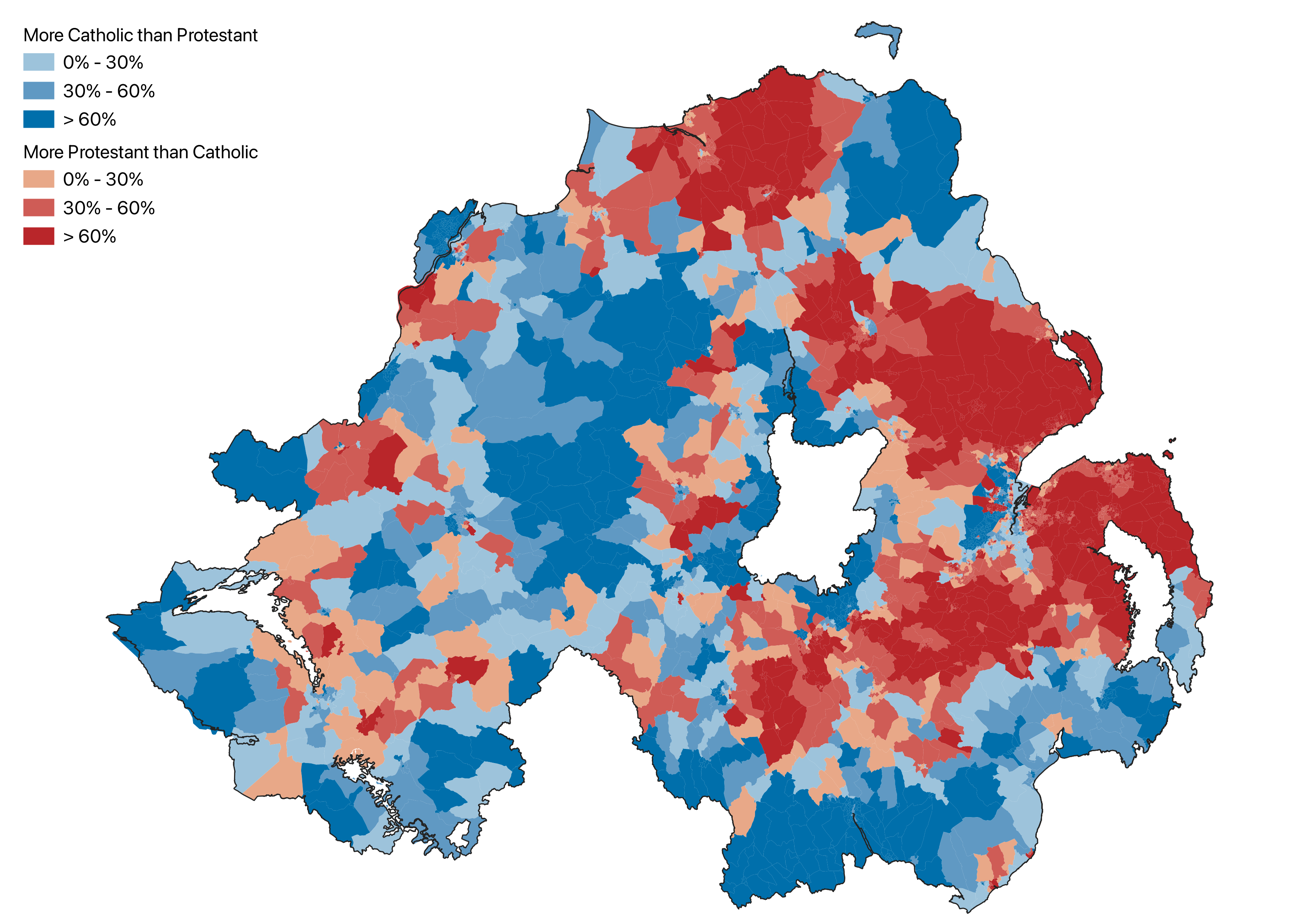
Religious Background from the 2021 census

Population pyramid of Northern Ireland by religion brought up in 2021

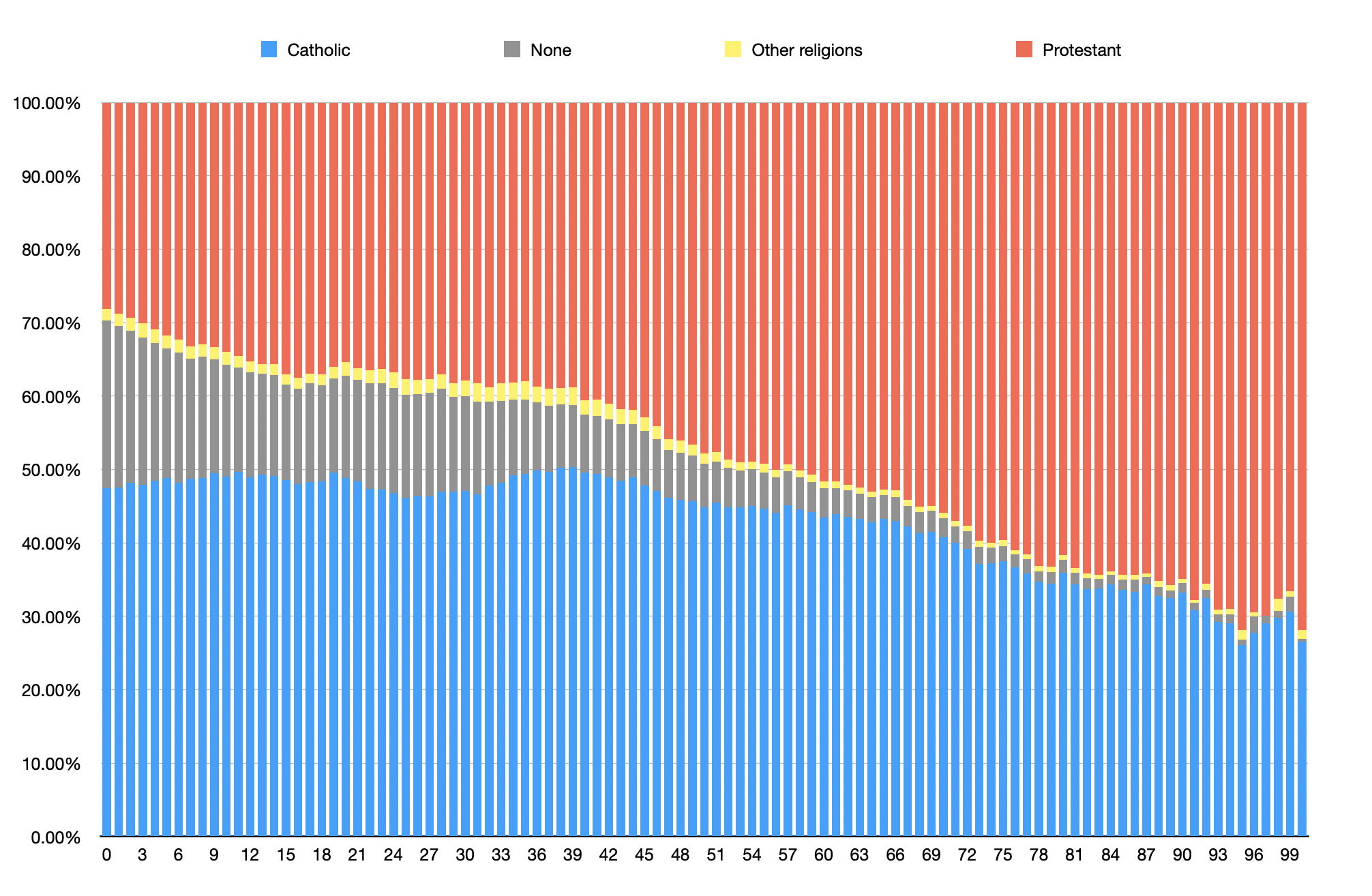
Percentage by Religious Background at each age

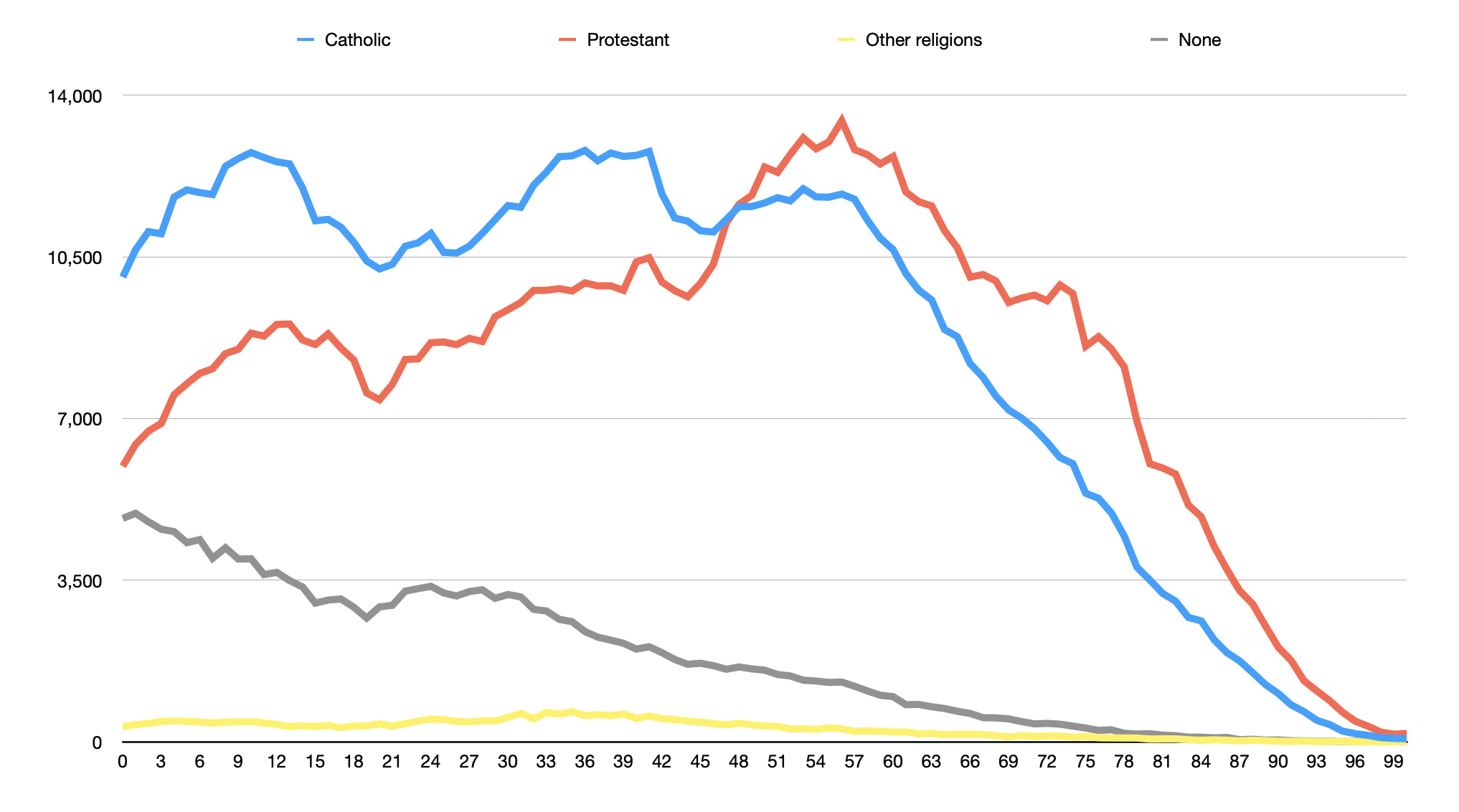
Population by Religious Background at each age
Changes in Religious Background, between 2001 and 2021

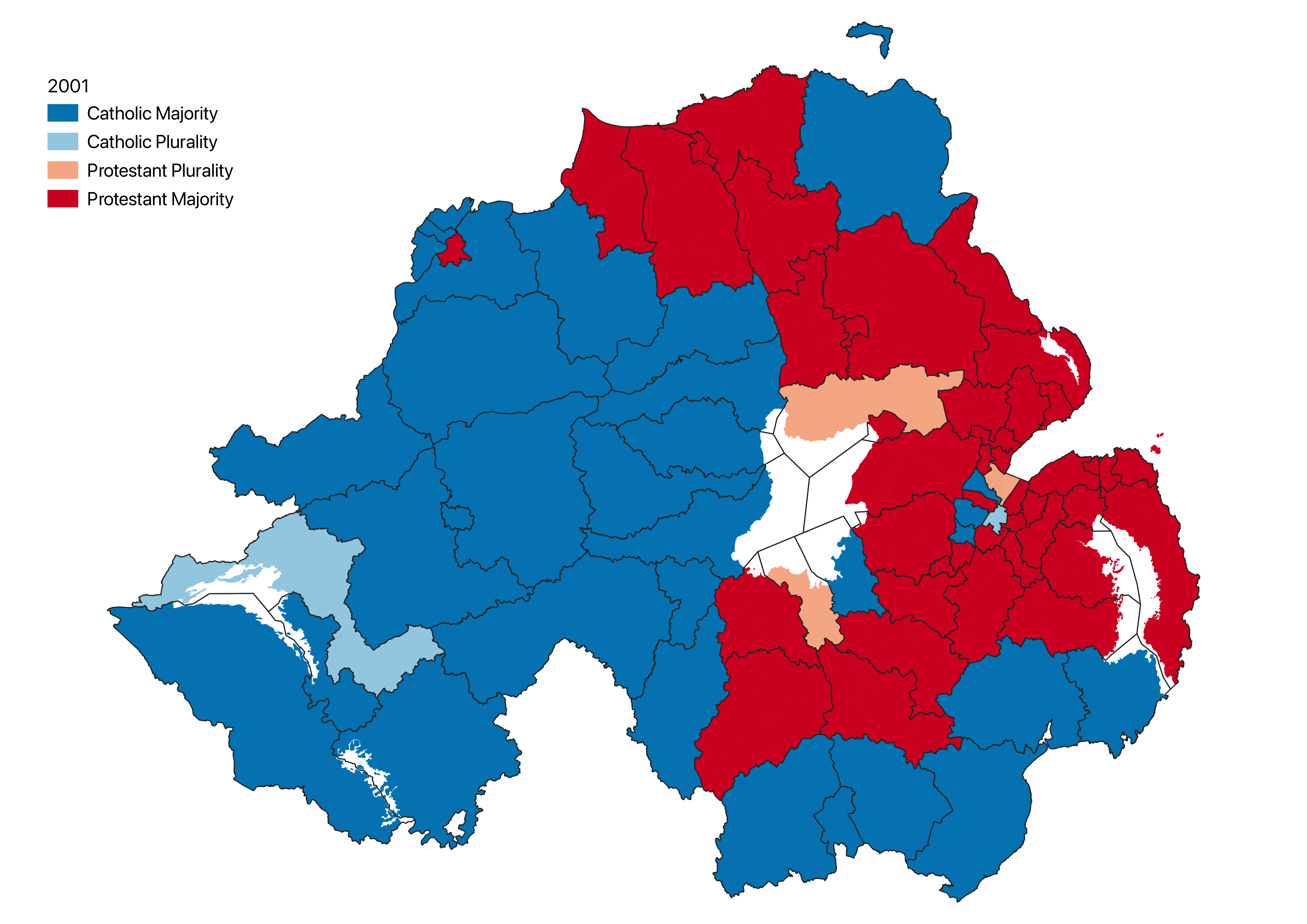
Religious Background in each Electoral Area 2001. Protestants outnumbered Catholics in 46 out of the 80 Electoral Areas

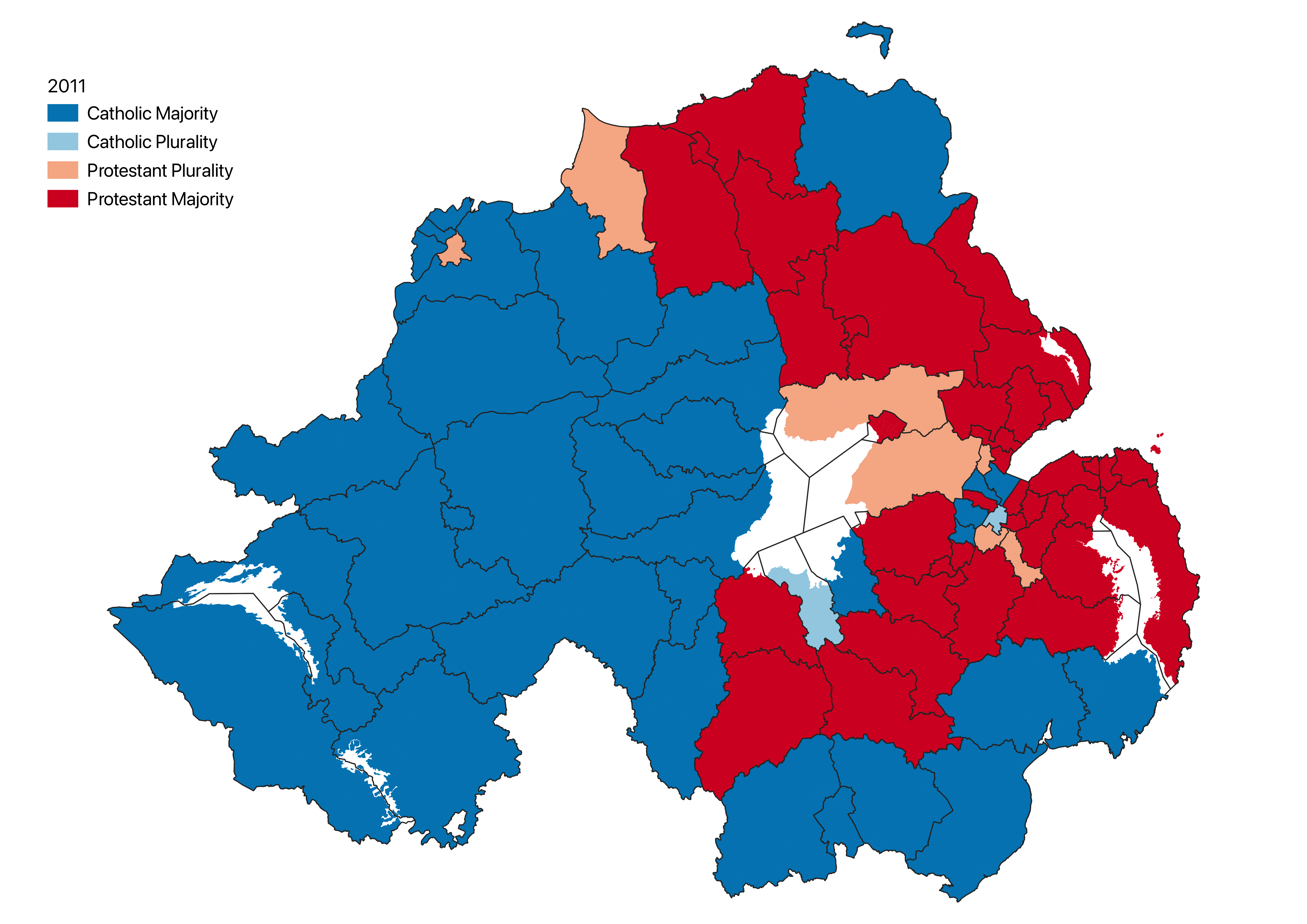
Religious Background in each Electoral Area 2011. Protestants outnumbered Catholics in 44 out of the 80 Electoral Areas

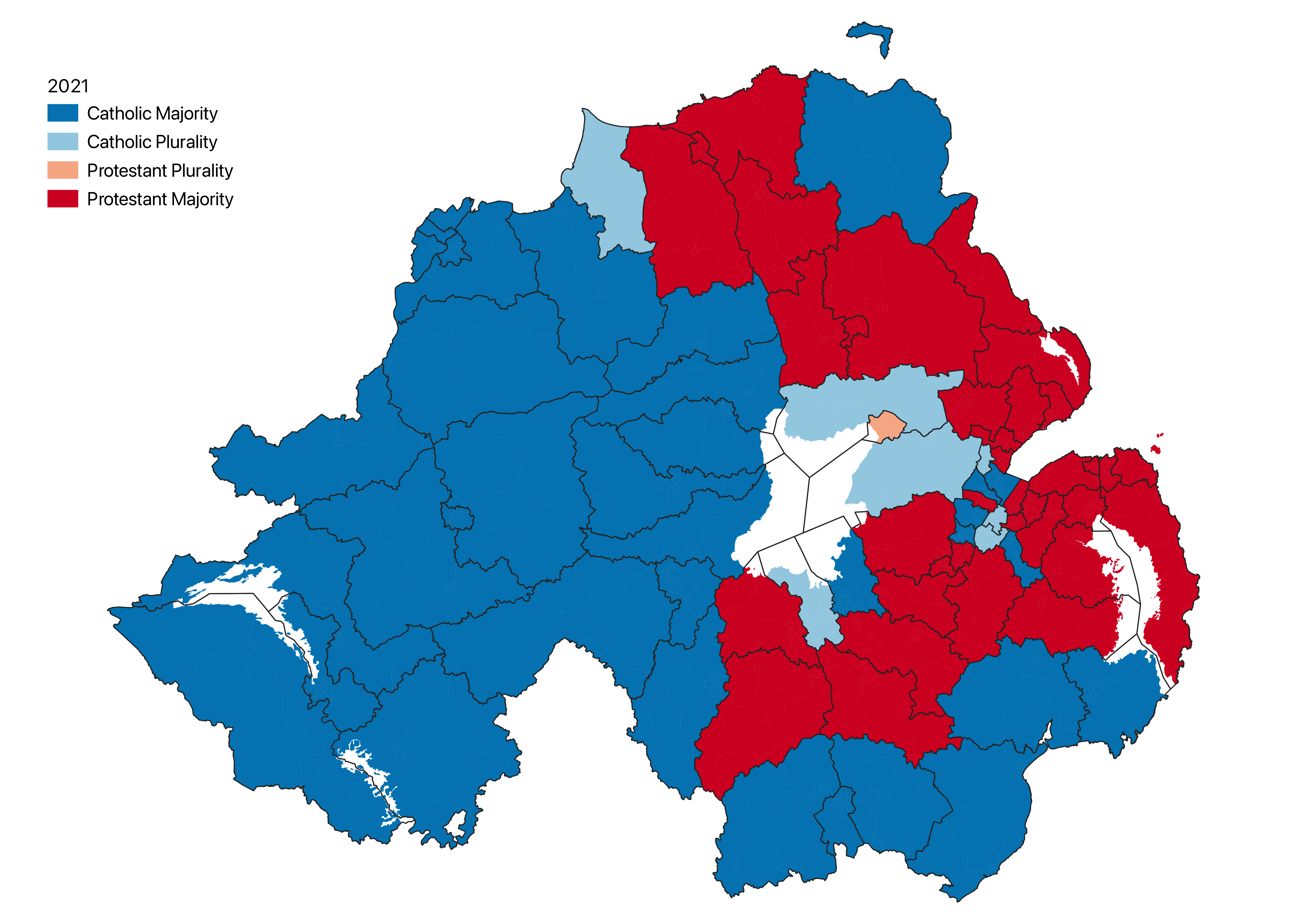
Religious Background in each Electoral Area 2021. Protestants outnumbered Catholics in 37 out of the 80 Electoral Areas

For the first century that Northern Ireland existed, the majority or plurality of its population identified with Protestantism, and with its founding, the region was intended to have a permanent Protestant majority. With the 2021 census, Catholics outnumbered Protestants for the first time. Reliable religion statistics are not available for 1971 or 1981 because boycott campaigns against the census during the Troubles resulted in high rates of non-response to the religion question.

Northern Ireland is geographically polarized by religion. Catholics are concentrated in the west and border areas, and recently in Belfast. Protestants are concentrated in the east, in an east–west band across northern Armagh to northern Down, and north–south from the Antrim coast to north of Belfast. Belfast was once a majority Protestant city but became a Catholic plurality city between the 2001 and 2011 censuses.

The following table shows the religion stated by respondents to the 2001, 2011 and 2021 censuses.

Religious affiliation in Northern Ireland
Religion stated	2001		2011		2021	
Religion stated	Number	%	Number	%	Number	%
Roman Catholic	678,462	40.2	738,033	40.8	805,151	42.3
Presbyterian Church in Ireland	348,742	20.7	345,101	19.1	316,103	16.6
Church of Ireland	257,788	15.3	248,821	13.7	219,788	11.5
Methodist Church in Ireland	59,173	3.5	54,253	3.0	44,728	2.4
Other Christian	102,221	6.1	104,380	5.8	130,377	6.9
(Total non-Roman Catholic Christian)	767,924	45.6	752,555	41.6	710,996	37.3
(Total Christian)	1,446,386	85.8	1,490,588	82.3	1,516,147	79.6
Other religion	5,028	0.3	14,859	0.8	25,519	1.3
No religion			183,164	10.1	330,983	17.4
Religion not stated			122,252	6.8	30,529	1.6
(No religion and Religion not stated)	233,853	13.9	305,416	16.9	361,512	19.0
Total population	1,685,267	100.0	1,810,863	100.0	1,903,175	100.0

The religious affiliations in the districts of Northern Ireland at the times of the 2001, 2011, and 2021 censuses were as follows. Note that these boundaries changed in 2015.

District	2001			2011			2021			
District	Catholic	Protestant and other Christian	Other or none	Catholic	Protestant and other Christian	Other or none	Catholic	Protestant and other Christian	No religion/not stated	Other
Antrim	35.2%	47.2%	17.6%	37.5%	43.2%	19.2%	38.1%	39.0%	21.6%	1.3%
Ards	10.4%	68.7%	20.9%	10.9%	65.4%	23.6%	10.9%	58.8%	29.2%	1.1%
Armagh	45.4%	45.5%	9.1%	44.8%	43.0%	12.2%	46.4%	41.1%	11.7%	0.9%
Ballymena	19.0%	67.8%	13.3%	20.4%	63.3%	16.3%	21.3%	58.4%	19.5%	0.7%
Ballymoney	29.5%	59.1%	11.3%	29.6%	56.7%	13.6%	30.0%	53.8%	15.5%	0.6%
Banbridge	28.6%	58.7%	12.7%	29.4%	55.3%	15.3%	31.0%	49.4%	18.6%	0.9%
Belfast	42.1%	40.3%	17.5%	41.9%	34.1%	24.0%	42.5%	29.7%	24.5%	3.3%
Carrickfergus	6.5%	70.4%	23.1%	7.6%	67.2%	25.2%	7.6%	59.5%	31.8%	1.2%
Castlereagh	15.8%	64.9%	19.3%	19.5%	57.3%	23.2%	21.8%	48.4%	28.2%	1.7%
Coleraine	24.1%	60.5%	15.4%	25.0%	56.8%	18.2%	25.3%	52.5%	21.2%	1.0%
Cookstown	55.2%	38.0%	6.8%	55.1%	34.0%	11.0%	58.2%	31.8%	9.6%	0.4%
Craigavon	41.7%	46.7%	11.6%	42.1%	42.1%	15.8%	43.4%	37.7%	17.5%	1.4%
Derry	70.9%	20.8%	8.4%	67.4%	19.4%	13.1%	70.3%	18.0%	10.6%	1.0%
Down	57.1%	29.2%	13.7%	57.5%	27.1%	15.4%	58.4%	24.8%	16.2%	0.6%
Dungannon	57.3%	34.9%	7.7%	58.7%	29.8%	11.5%	62.6%	26.9%	9.9%	0.7%
Fermanagh	55.5%	36.1%	8.4%	54.9%	34.3%	10.8%	55.8%	32.1%	11.2%	0.9%
Larne	22.2%	61.9%	15.9%	21.8%	59.7%	18.5%	21.3%	54.7%	23.3%	0.7%
Limavady	53.1%	36.1%	10.7%	56.0%	34.3%	9.7%	57.5%	31.7%	10.5%	0.3%
Lisburn	30.1%	53.6%	16.4%	32.8%	47.9%	19.3%	35.2%	41.8%	21.6%	1.4%
Magherafelt	61.5%	32.0%	6.5%	62.4%	28.3%	9.3%	65.0%	26.2%	8.1%	0.7%
Moyle	56.6%	33.8%	9.6%	54.4%	32.3%	13.3%	54.3%	32.1%	13.1%	0.5%
Newry and Mourne	75.9%	16.4%	7.7%	72.1%	15.2%	12.7%	75.1%	14.9%	9.3%	0.7%
Newtownabbey	17.1%	64.5%	18.4%	19.9%	57.8%	22.3%	22.1%	51.0%	25.6%	1.4%
North Down	10.0%	64.5%	25.5%	11.2%	60.3%	28.5%	11.6%	52.2%	34.9%	1.4%
Omagh	65.1%	26.3%	8.6%	65.4%	24.8%	9.8%	67.7%	22.9%	8.8%	0.7%
Strabane	63.1%	30.9%	6.0%	60.1%	30.7%	9.2%	63.0%	29.5%	7.0%	0.5%

=== "Religion" vs "religion or religion Raised In" (religious background) ===
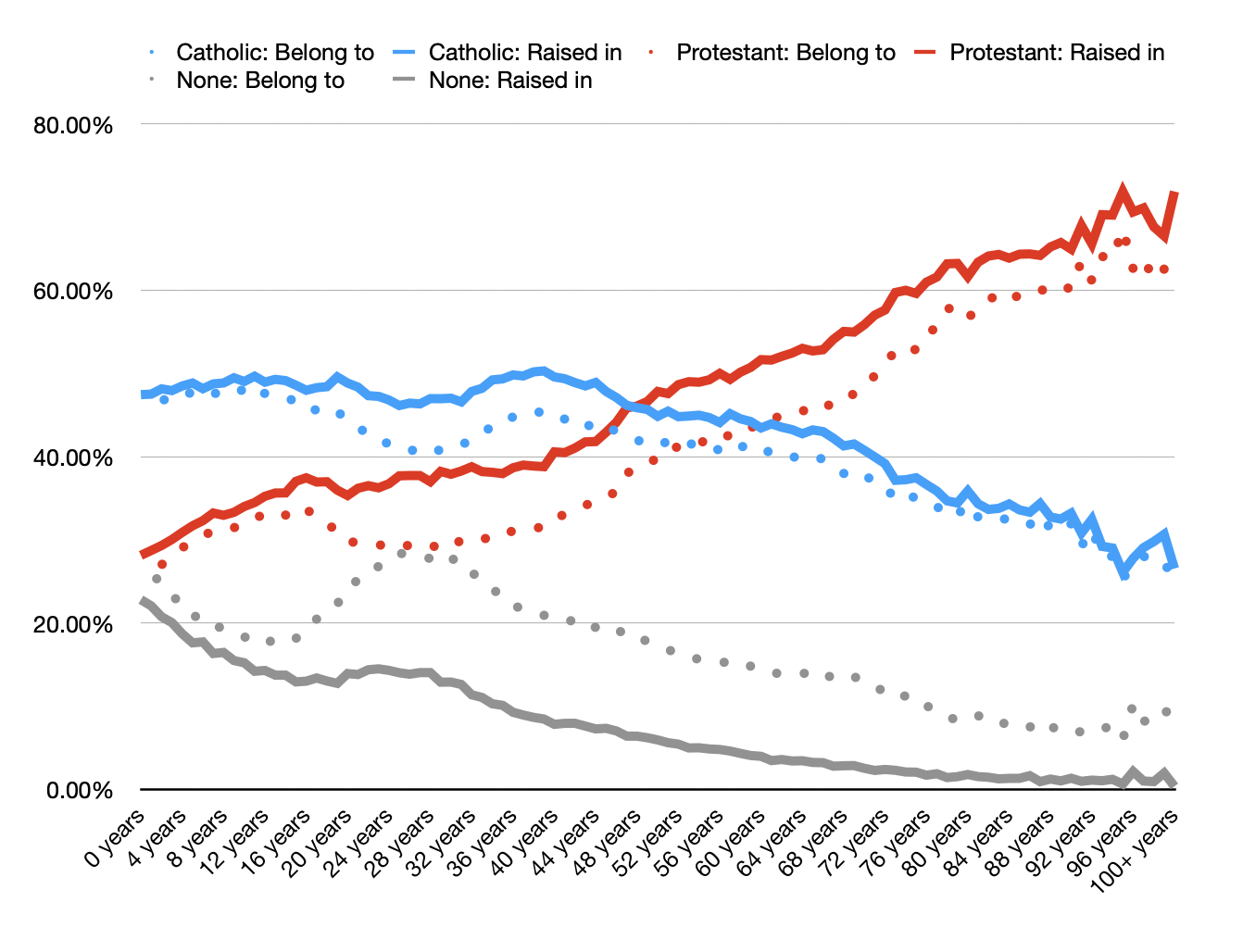
Religion and Religion Raised in by age (published in 2024)

The census included two questions related to religion: "what religion, religious denomination or body do you belong to?" and "what religion, religious denomination or body were you brought up in?"

This produced two sets of results, where the "current religion" is in all cases less than the "religion brought up in"

The difference between the two measurements is higher for Protestants than for Catholics, and is higher among younger people.

Geographically, using Religion instead of Religious Background does not change the areas where Catholic outnumber Protestants, or vice versa, but results in some regions where a majority turns into a plurality.

'Religion' vs 'Religion or Religion Raised In' mapped by DEA

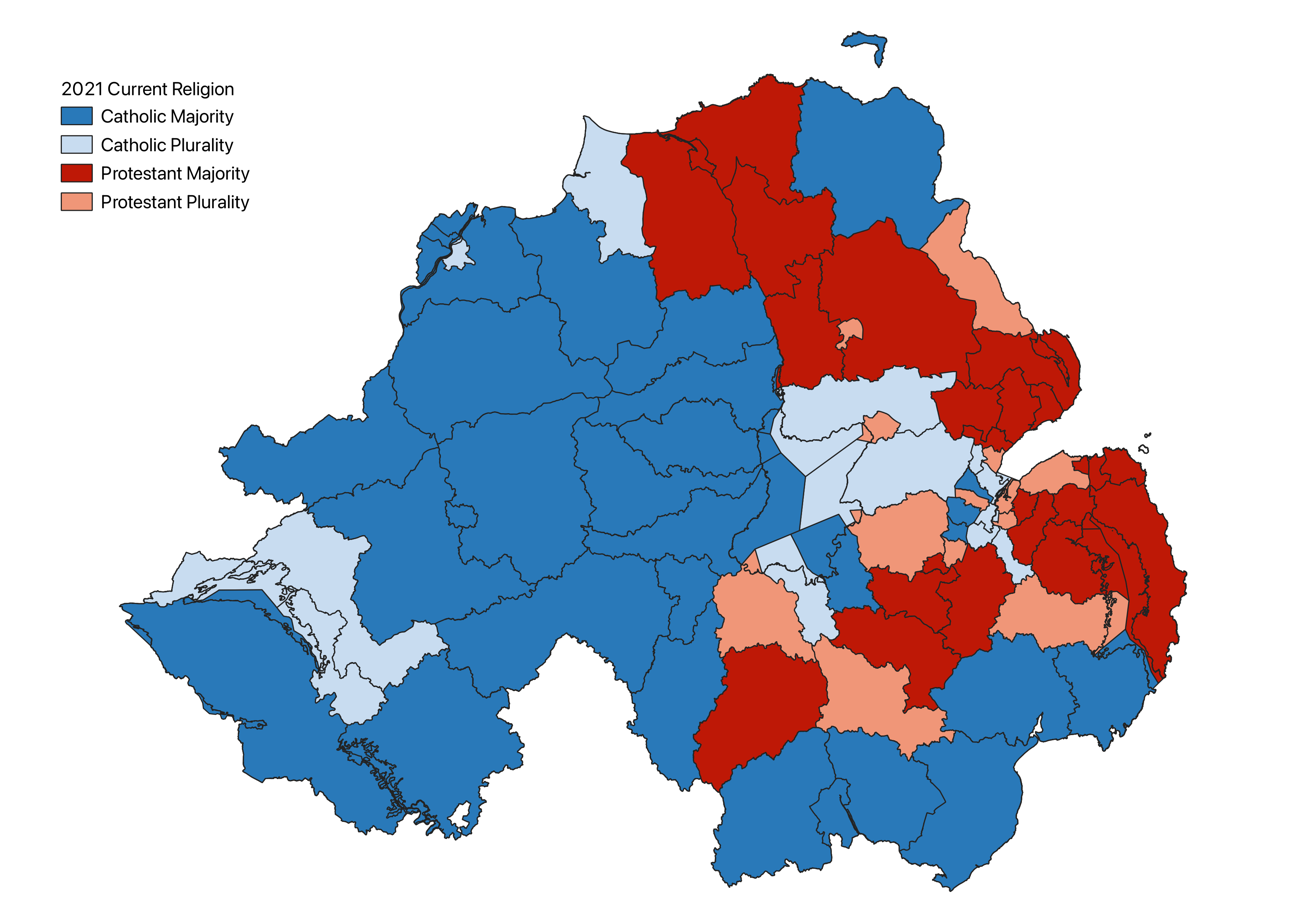
Religious plurality or majority based on "religion belong to"

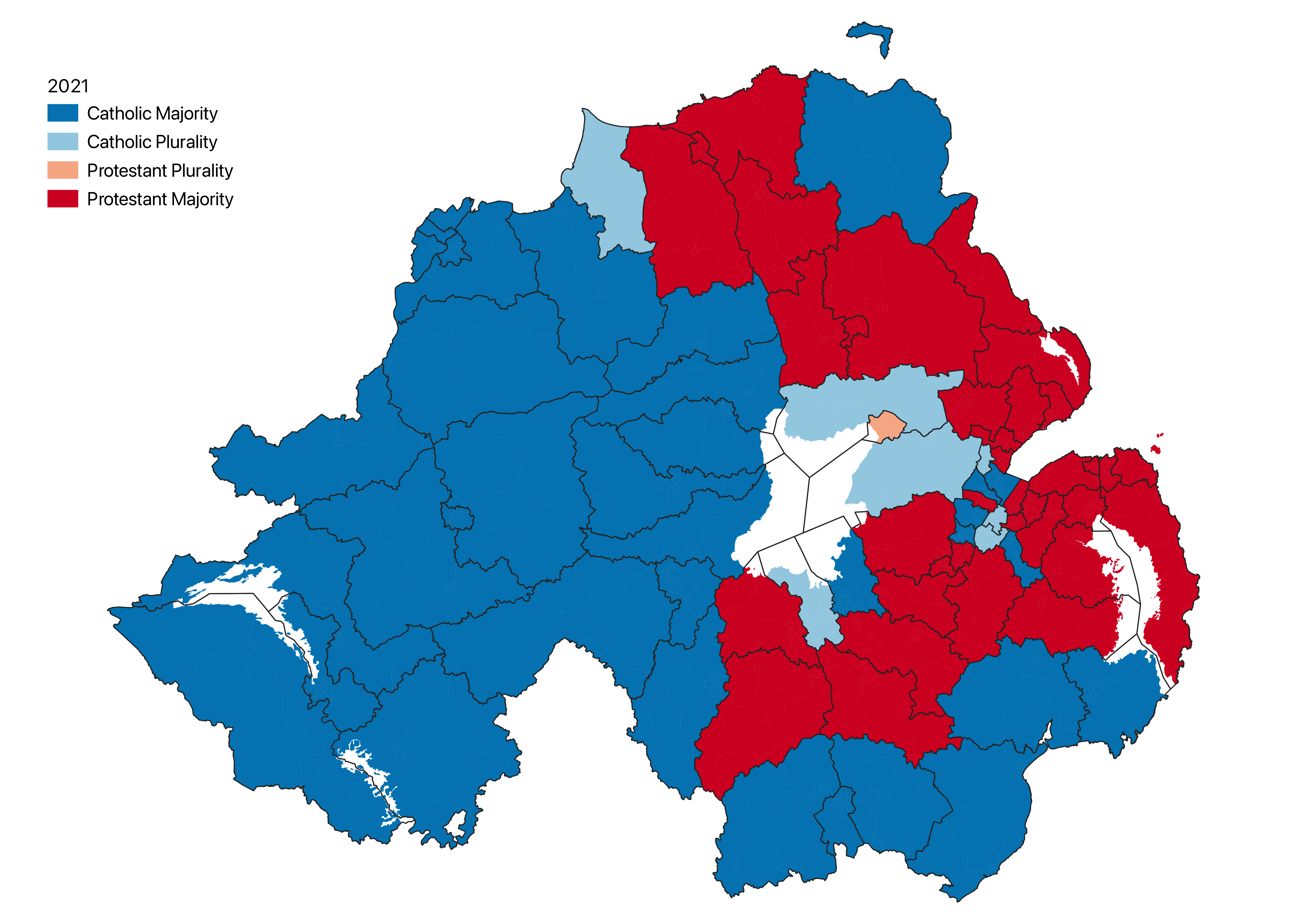
Religious Background in each Electoral Area 2021.

== National identity ==
National Identity

Map of predominant national identity in the 2021 census in Northern Ireland

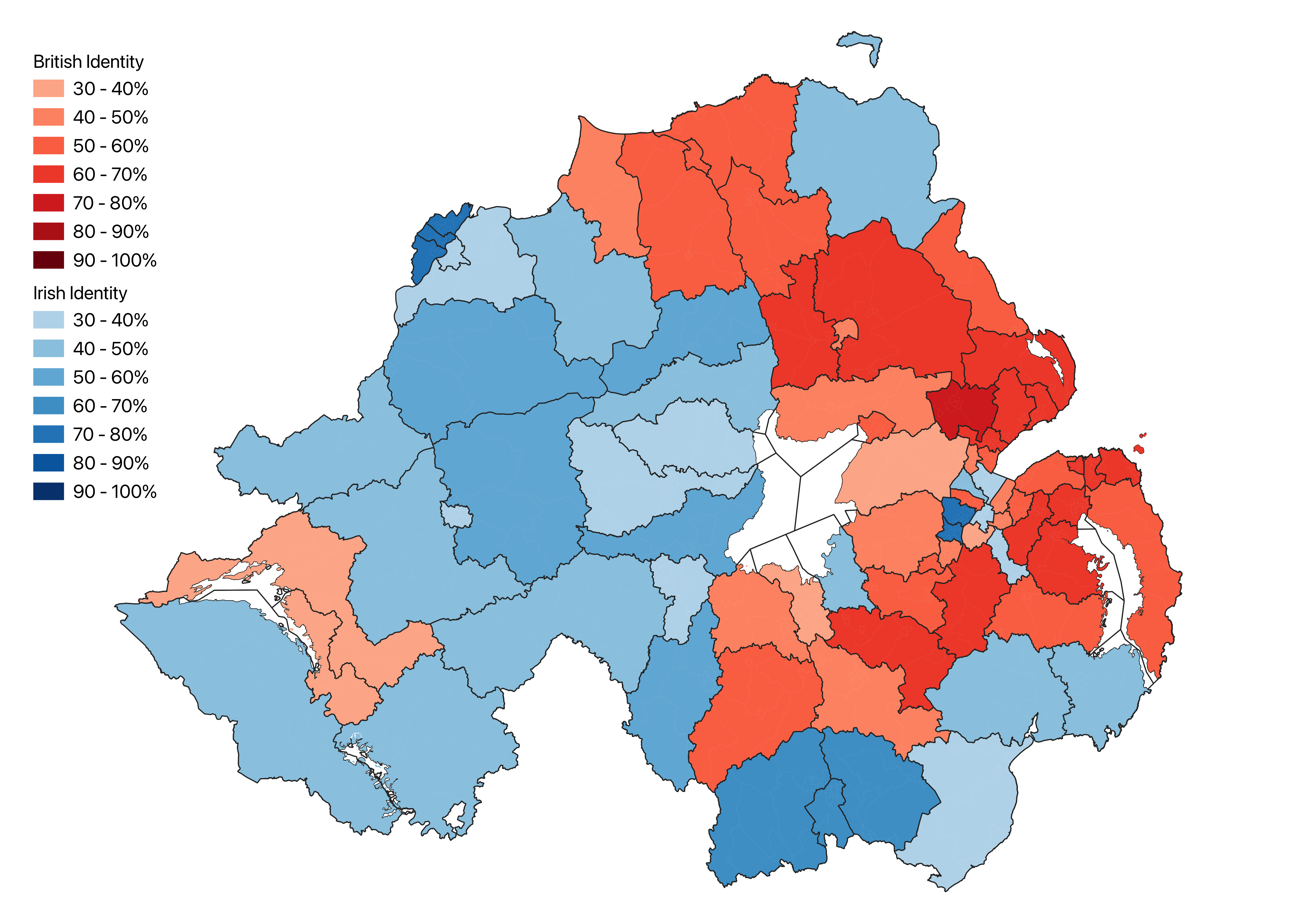
Predominant National Identity by District Electoral Area (DEA)

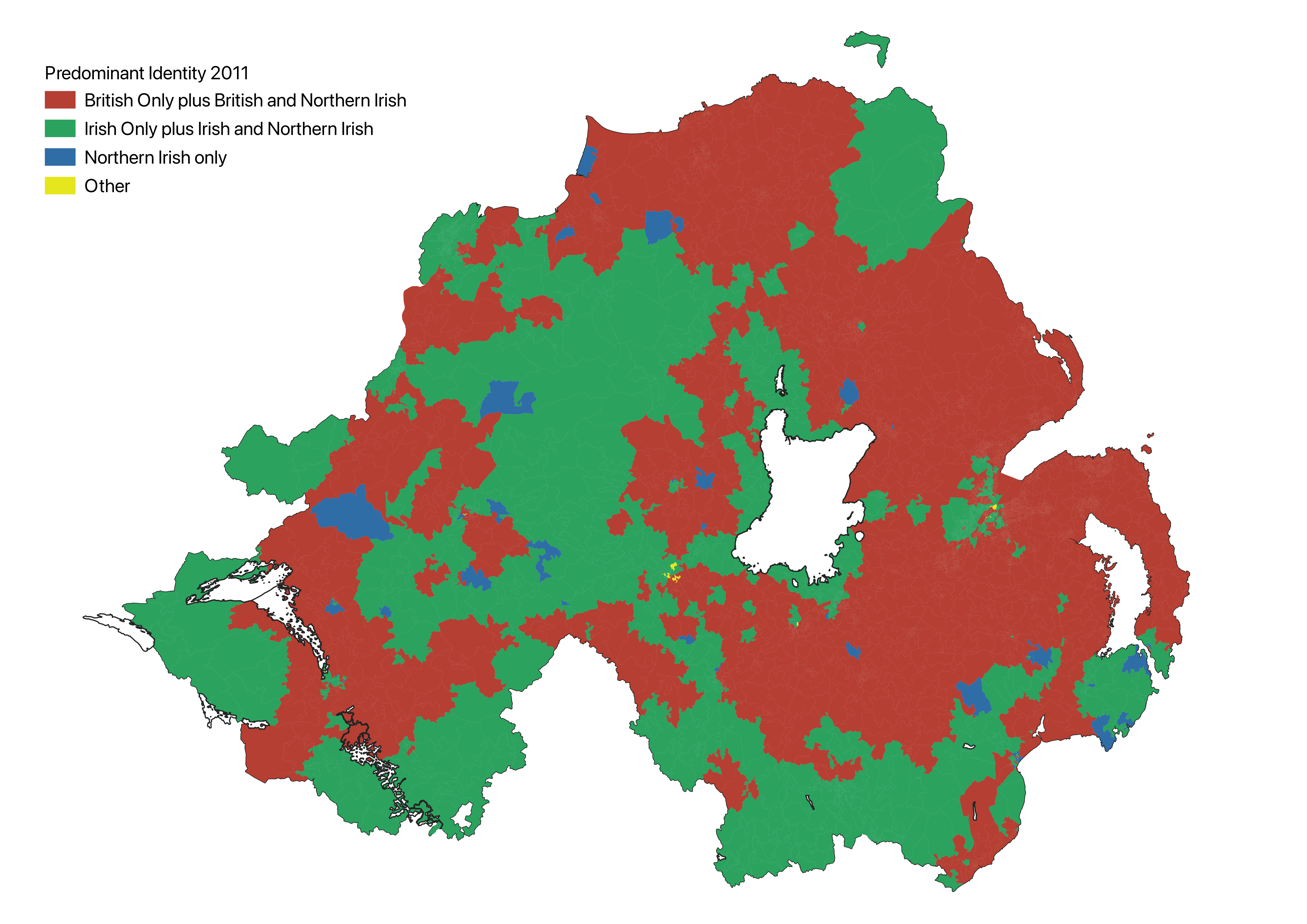
Most commonly selected National Identity in 2011 census, based on 2011 Census "Small Areas". Combinations that include both British and Irish are excluded. "Other" consists of National Identity responses that do not include Irish, British, or Northern Irish in any combination.

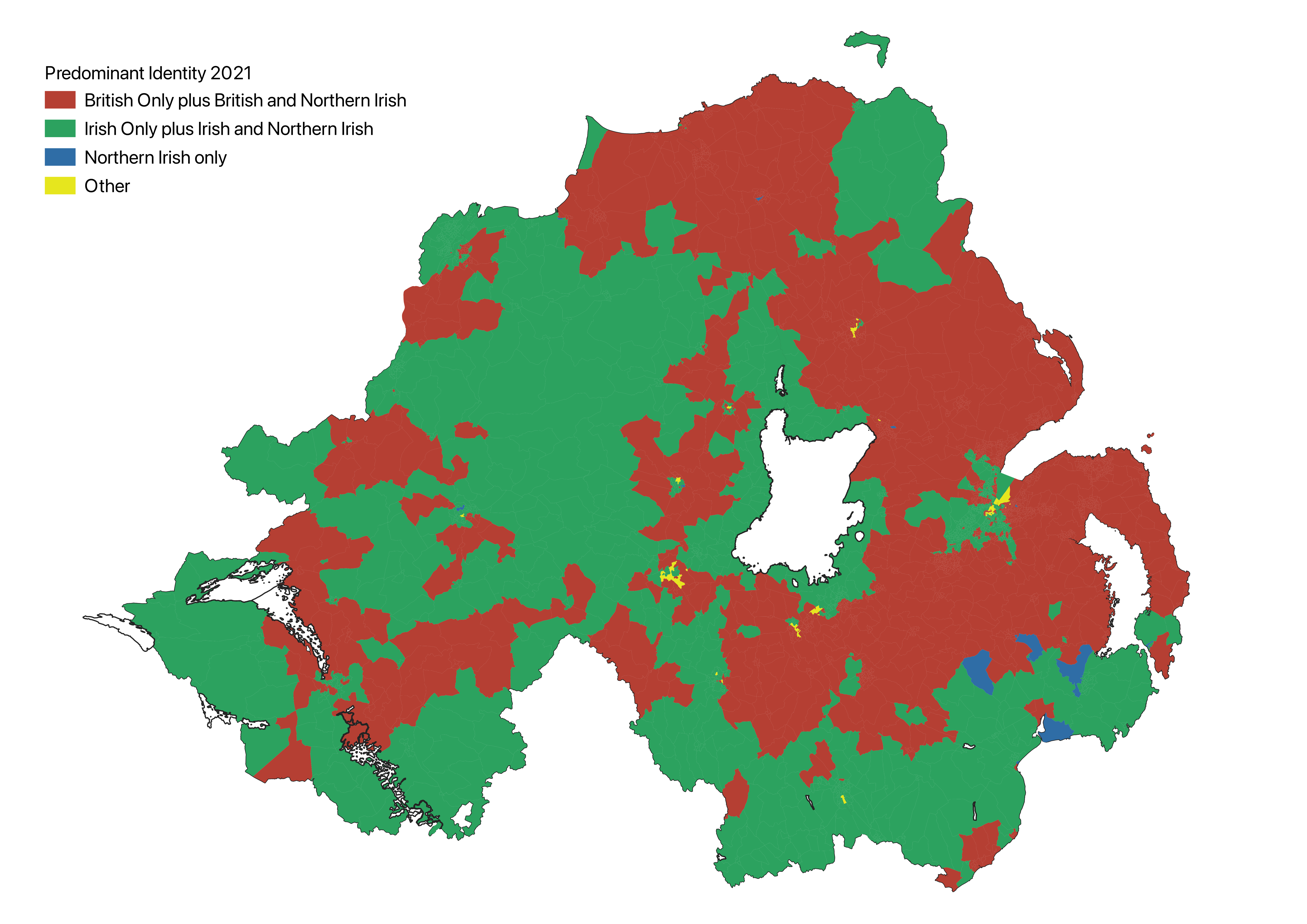
Most commonly selected National Identity in 2021 census, based on 2021 Census "Data Zones" so cannot be directly compared to 2011

In Northern Ireland national identity is complex. Many in Northern Ireland have a British national identity and view the English, Scots and Welsh as fellow members of their common nation while regarding people from the Republic of Ireland as foreigners. Many others in Northern Ireland view people from the Republic of Ireland as being members of their common nation encompassing the island of Ireland and regard the English, Scots and Welsh as foreigners. Co-existing with this dichotomy is a Northern Irish identity, which can be held alone or, as is also the case with Englishness, Scottishness and Welshness, alongside a British identity, or alongside an Irish identity. A small number of people see themselves as being both British and Irish.

In the 2021 census respondents gave their national identity as follows.

2021 Census
National identity	Respondents
British only	606,264(31.86%)
Irish only	554,415(29.13%)
Northern Irish only	376,444(19.78%)
British and Northern Irish	151,328(7.95%)
Irish and Northern Irish	33,580(1.76%)
Other British, Irish, and/or Northern Irish	39,817(2.09%)
English, Scottish, or Welsh	40,697(2.14%)
Other	100,624(5.29%)

Identity in Northern Ireland in 2021 by population pyramid

British only identity

Irish only identity

Northern Irish only identity

=== National identity and religion ===
National Identity by Religions breaks down as follows. All tables, maps, and graphs in this section use "Religion or Religion brought up in" from the census.

	Catholic	Protestant	Other	No religion	All residents
British only	6.6%	57.8%	29.3%	35.5%	31.9%
British and Northern Irish only	0.8%	15.4%	3.9%	9.0%	8.0%
Irish only	60.0%	2.0%	8.8%	7.6%	29.1%
Irish and Northern Irish only	3.1%	0.4%	1.0%	1.5%	1.8%
Northern Irish only	20.9%	17.7%	9.9%	25.6%	19.8%
British and Irish only	0.7%	0.5%	1.1%	0.6%	0.6%
British, Irish and Northern Irish only	0.9%	1.9%	1.5%	2.3%	1.5%
Other	7.0%	4.4%	44.7%	18.0%	7.4%
British only plus British and Northern Irish only	7.4%	73.1%	33.2%	44.5%	39.9%
Irish only plus Irish and Northern Irish only	63.1%	2.4%	9.7%	9.0%	30.9%
Other combinations of British, Irish and Northern Irish	1.6%	2.4%	2.6%	2.9%	2.1%
Any choice that includes British	9.0%	75.5%	35.8%	47.4%	42.0%
Any choice that includes Irish	64.7%	4.8%	12.3%	11.9%	33.0%

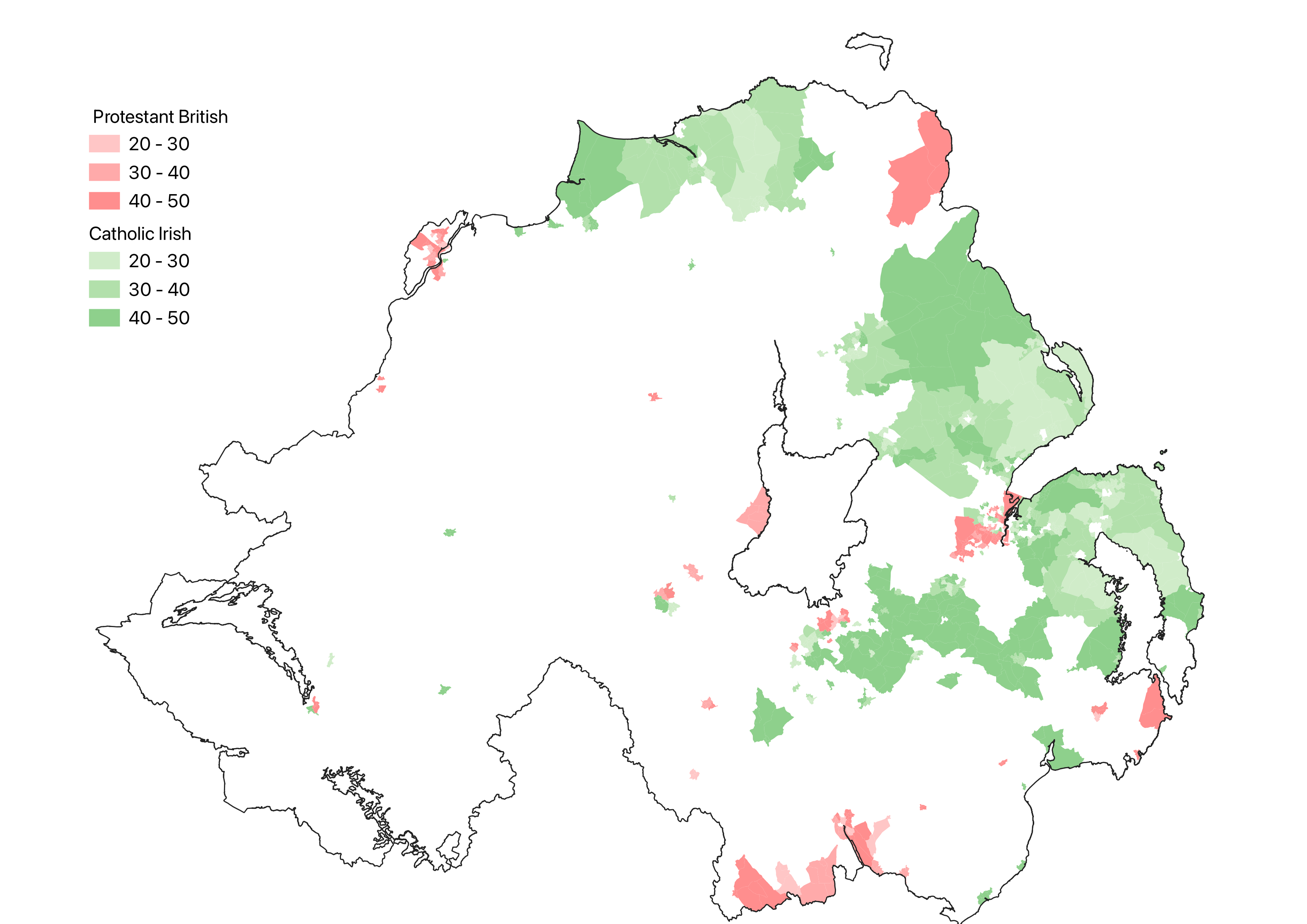
Areas where less than 50% Catholics identify as Irish (green) and less than 50% Protestants identify as British (red)

Although there is a strong correlation between religion and national identity, Catholics tending to identify as Irish and Protestants tending to identify as British, this is not an absolute relationship, and the correlation is weaker amongst Catholics than it is amongst Protestants. Amongst Catholics, geography also plays an important role, with Catholics in heavily Protestant parts of Northern Ireland being more likely to call themselves British and less likely to call themselves Irish than Catholics in more Catholic areas of Northern Ireland. The reverse is true for Protestants, but to a lesser extent. However, the actual numbers are low for both those Protestants identifying as Irish and Catholics identifying as British, since it happens in areas where the respective religion is proportionally low.

In the 2021 census, Protestants outnumbered Catholics in 37 DEAs, down from 44 in 2011, while those considering themselves British outnumbered those who considered themselves Irish in 45 DEAs, down from 58 in 2011.

The majority of areas being British, despite the majority of areas being Catholic, is partly because Catholics were more likely to see themselves as British than Protestants were to see themselves as Irish (however this changed significantly between 2011 and 2021 - 9% vs. 4.8% respectively – in 2011 it was 13% vs 4% respectively), but is also partly because those of no religion were more likely to see themselves as British as see themselves as Irish. The non-religious tend to live in Protestant areas, suggesting that they are mostly of Protestant descent. In 2021, 47% of those professing no religion considered themselves British, while 12% considered themselves Irish. Members of the immigrant population, which includes many Poles, are also more likely to consider themselves Catholic.

Northern Irish identity was slightly more likely amongst Catholics than amongst Protestants, and it varied little according to geography.

Protestant National Identity

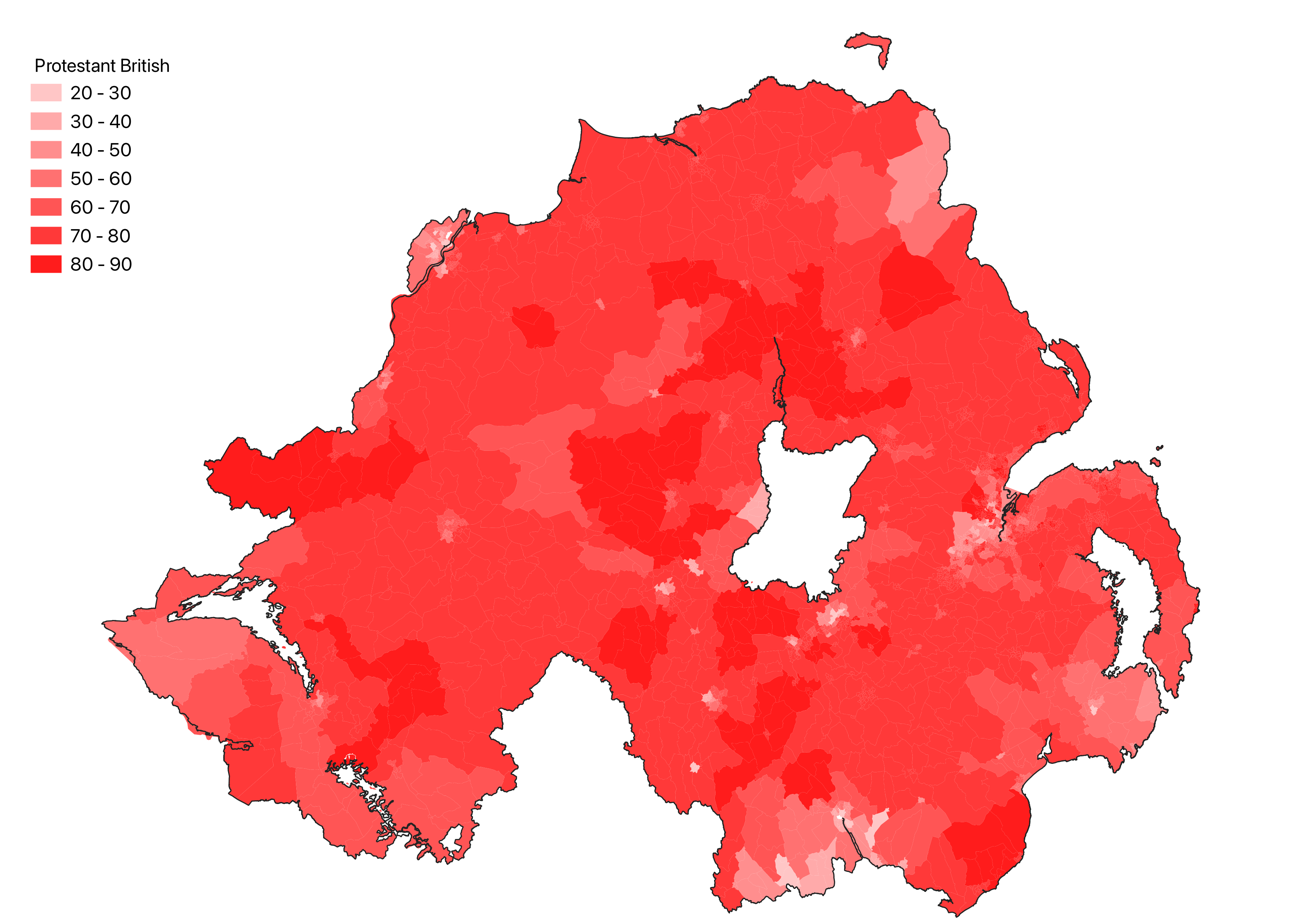
Percentage of Protestants identifying as British

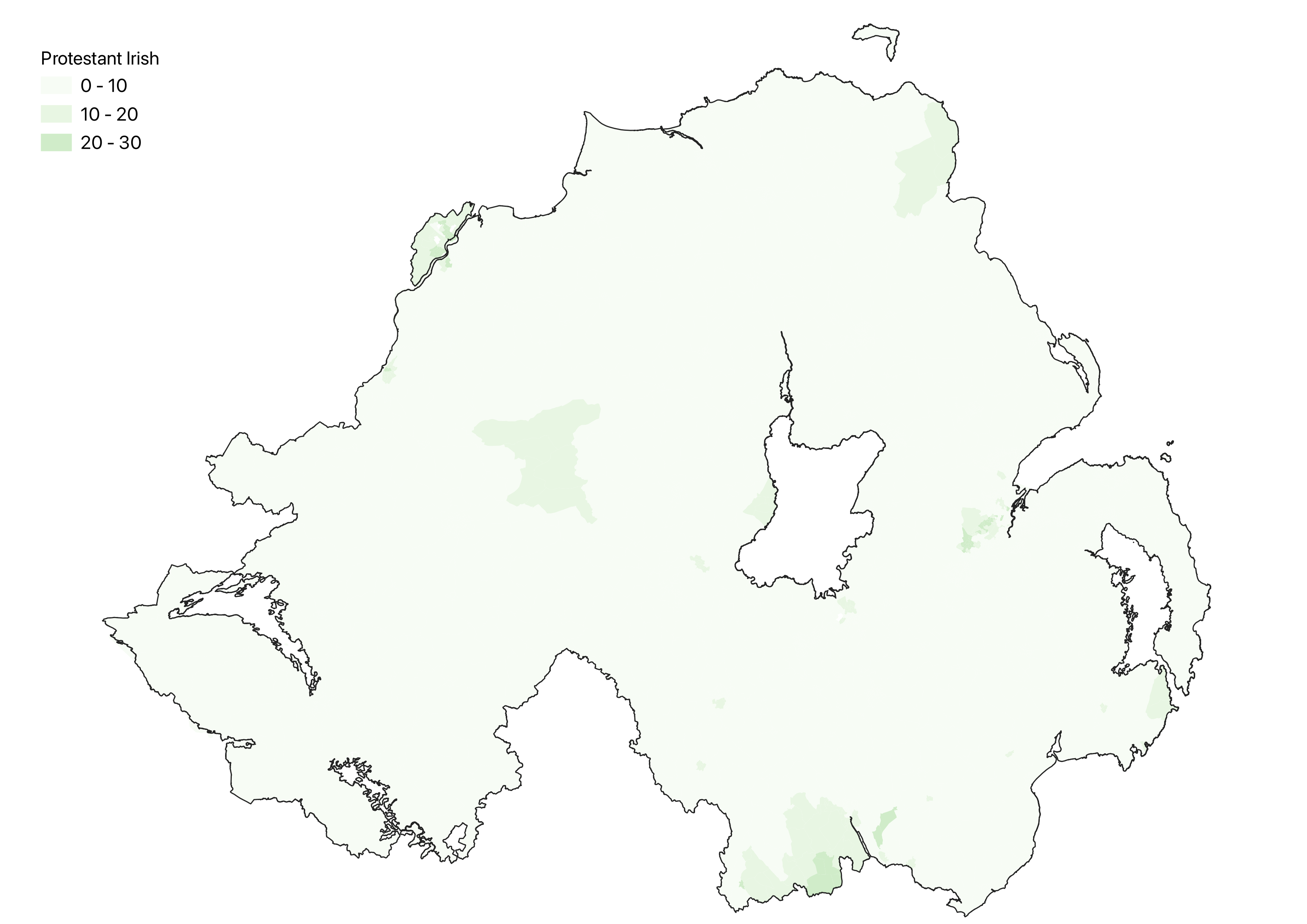
Percentage of Protestants identifying as Irish

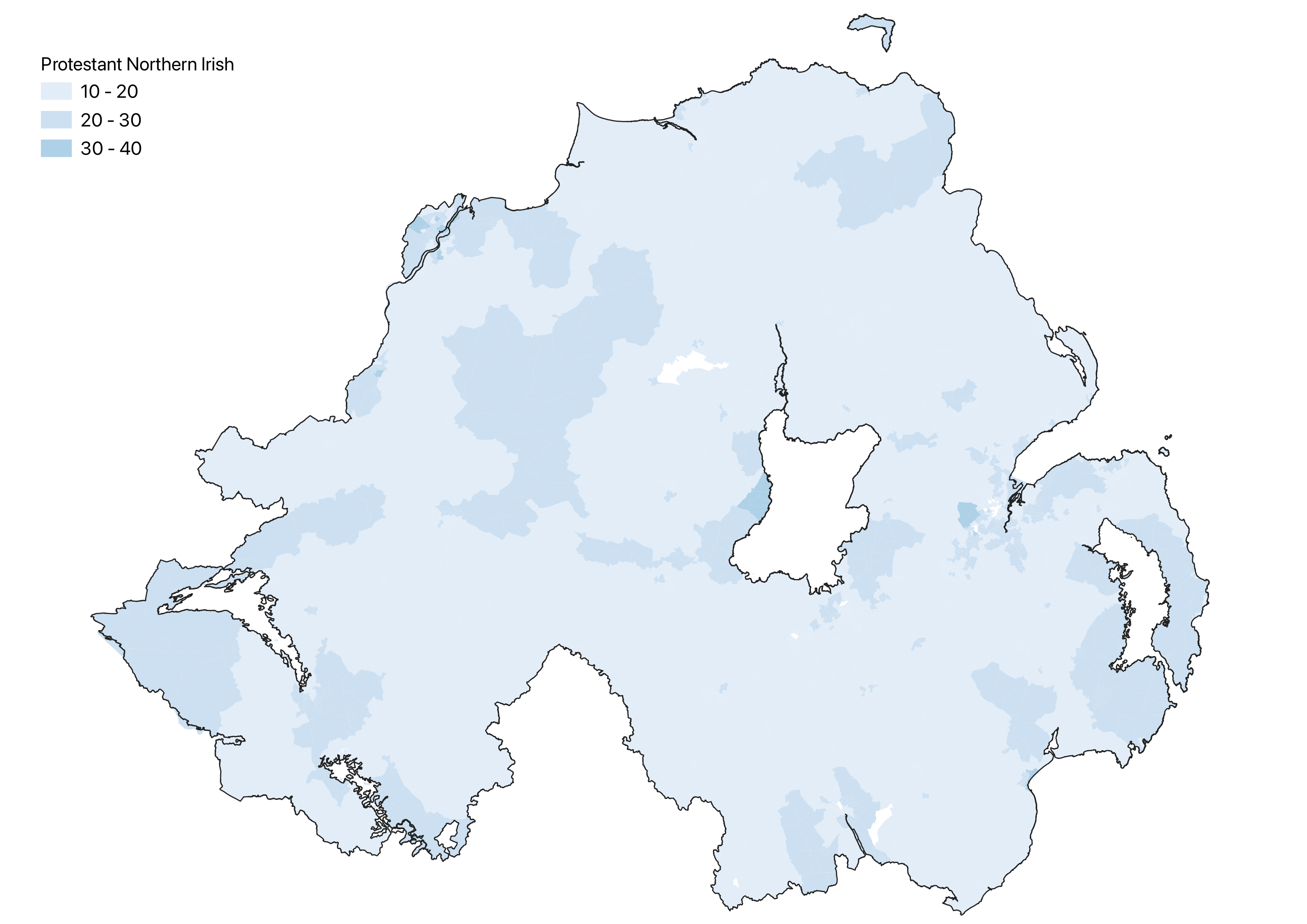
Percentage of Protestants identifying as Northern Irish
Catholic National Identity

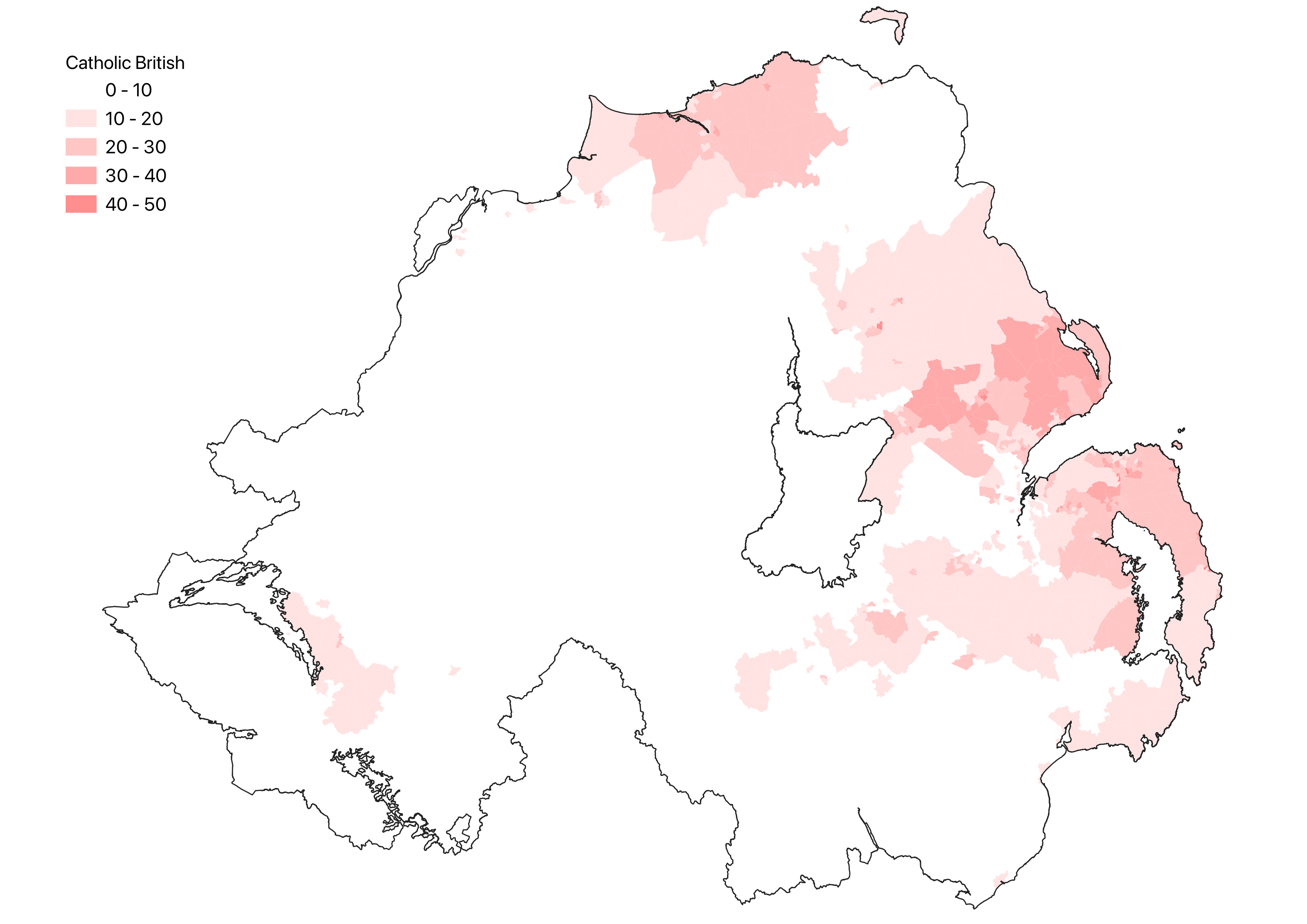
Percentage of Catholics identifying as British

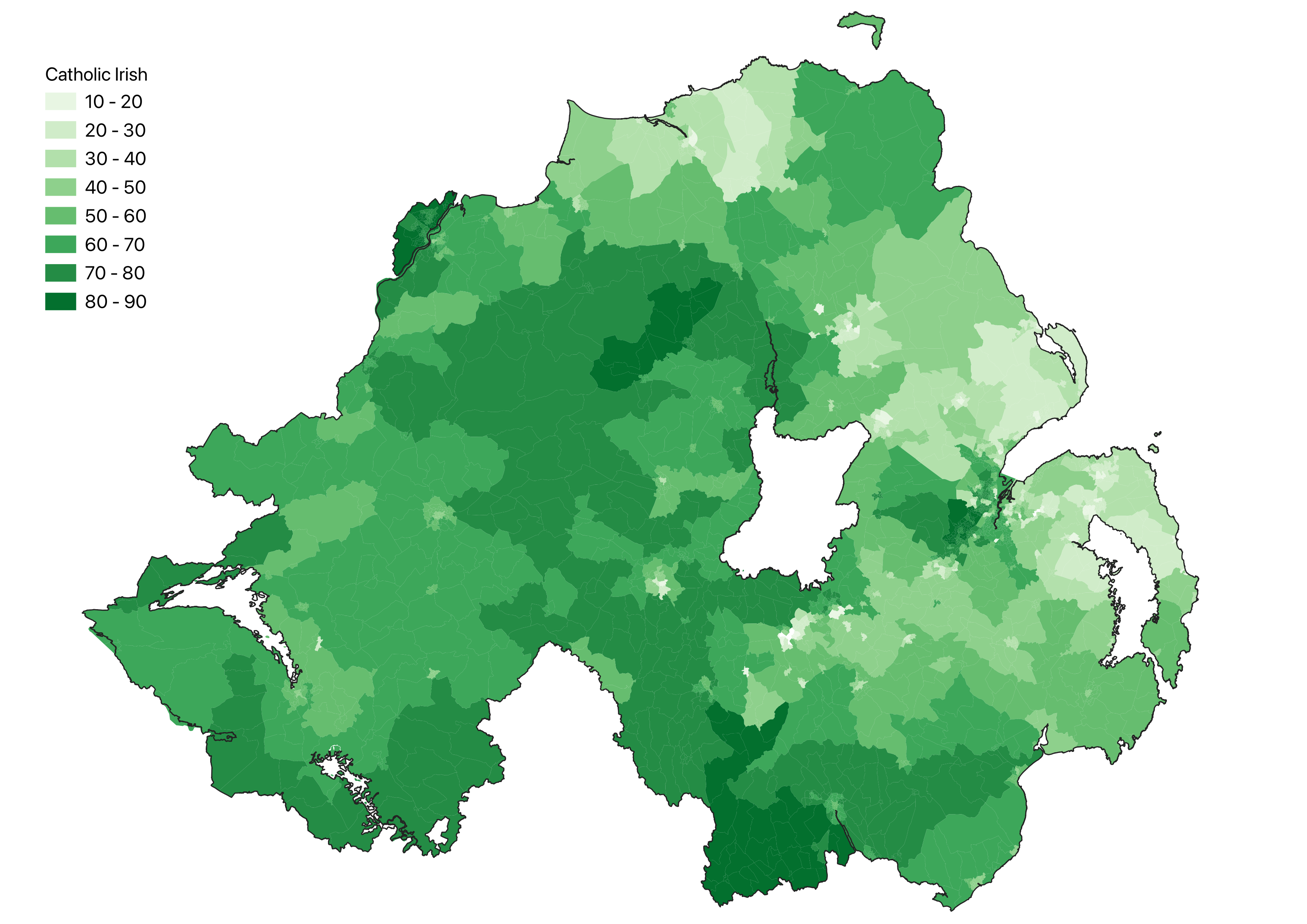
Percentage of Catholics identifying as Irish

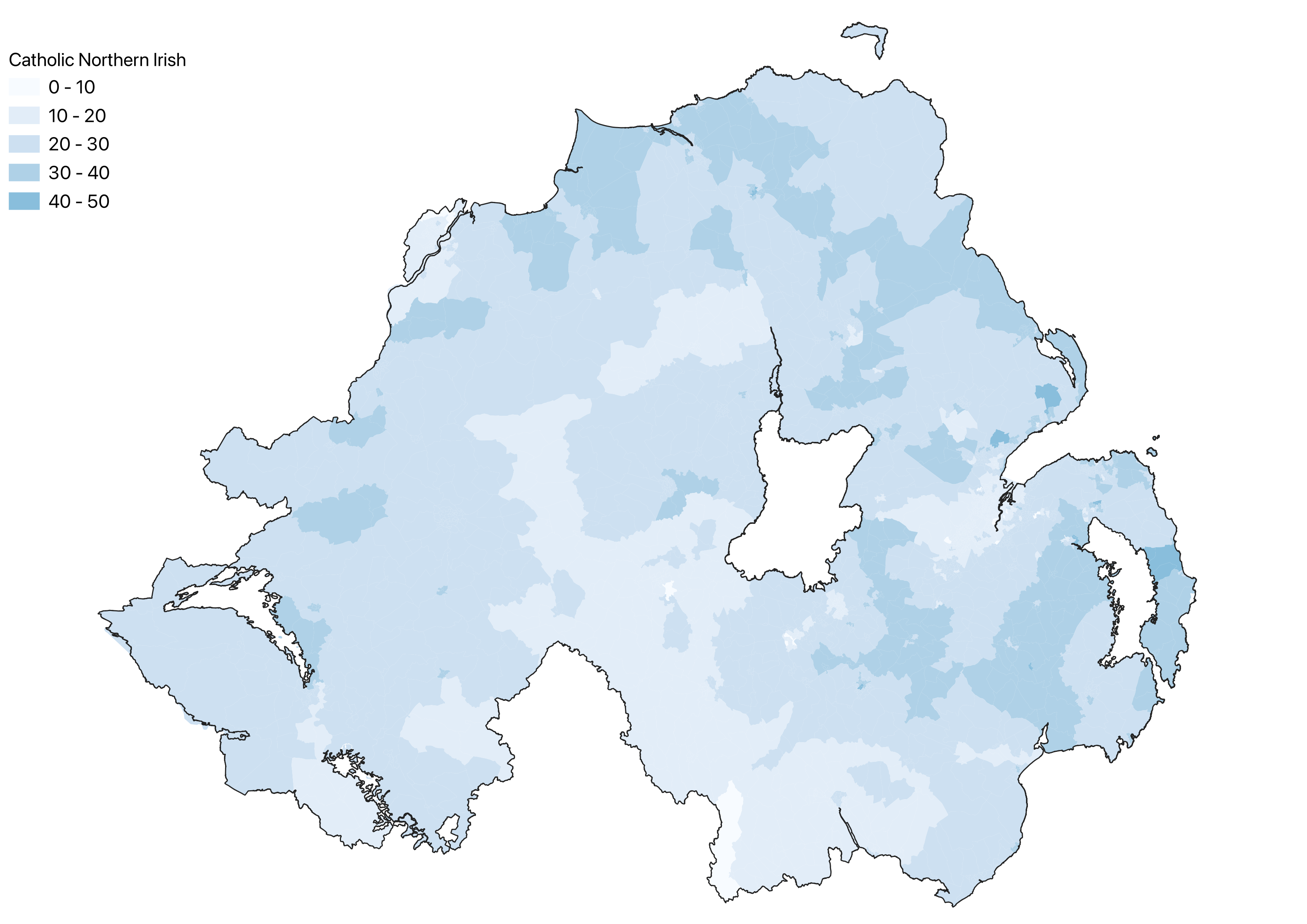
Percentage of Catholics identifying as Northern Irish
No religion national identity

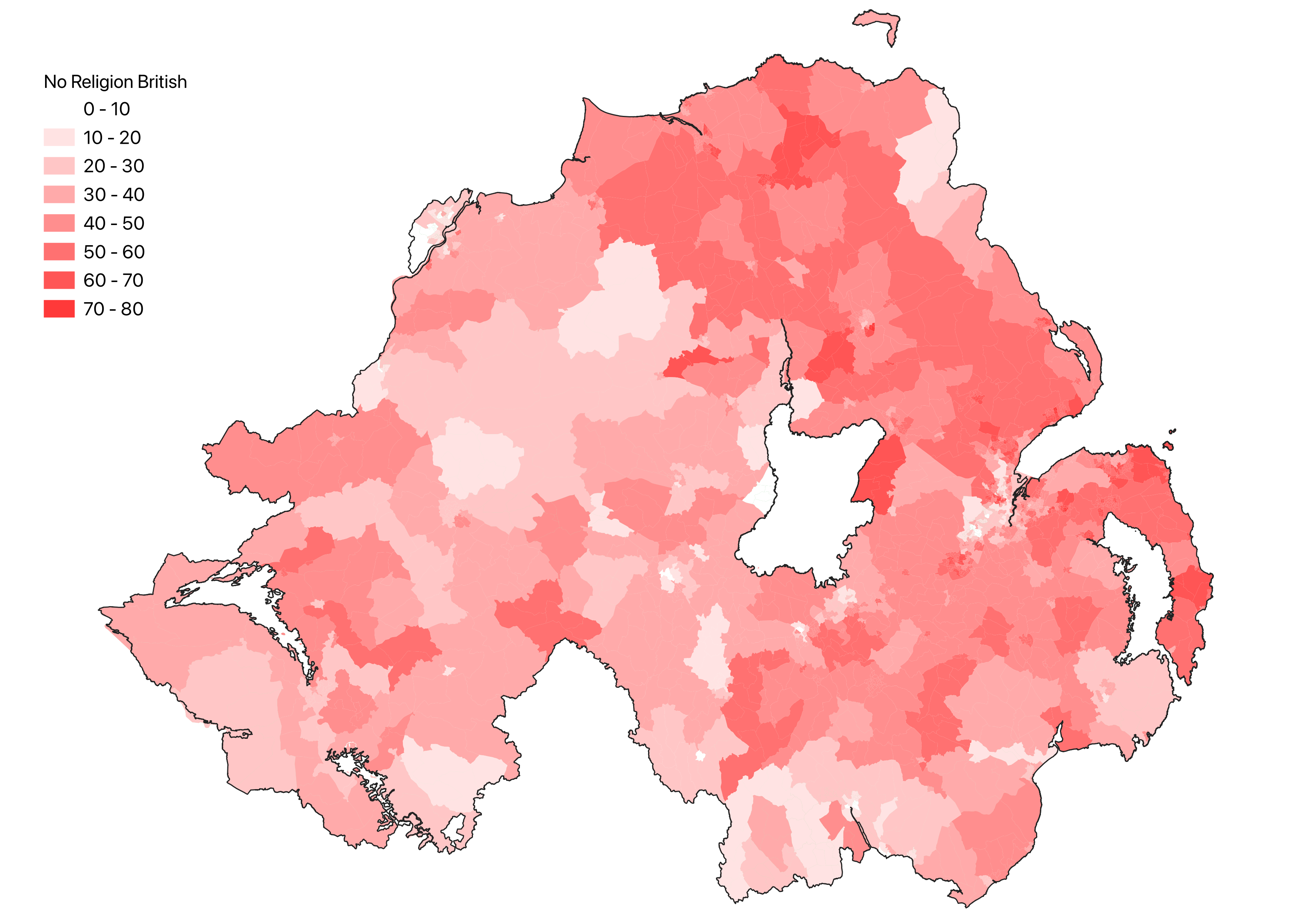
Percentage of professing no religion identifying as British

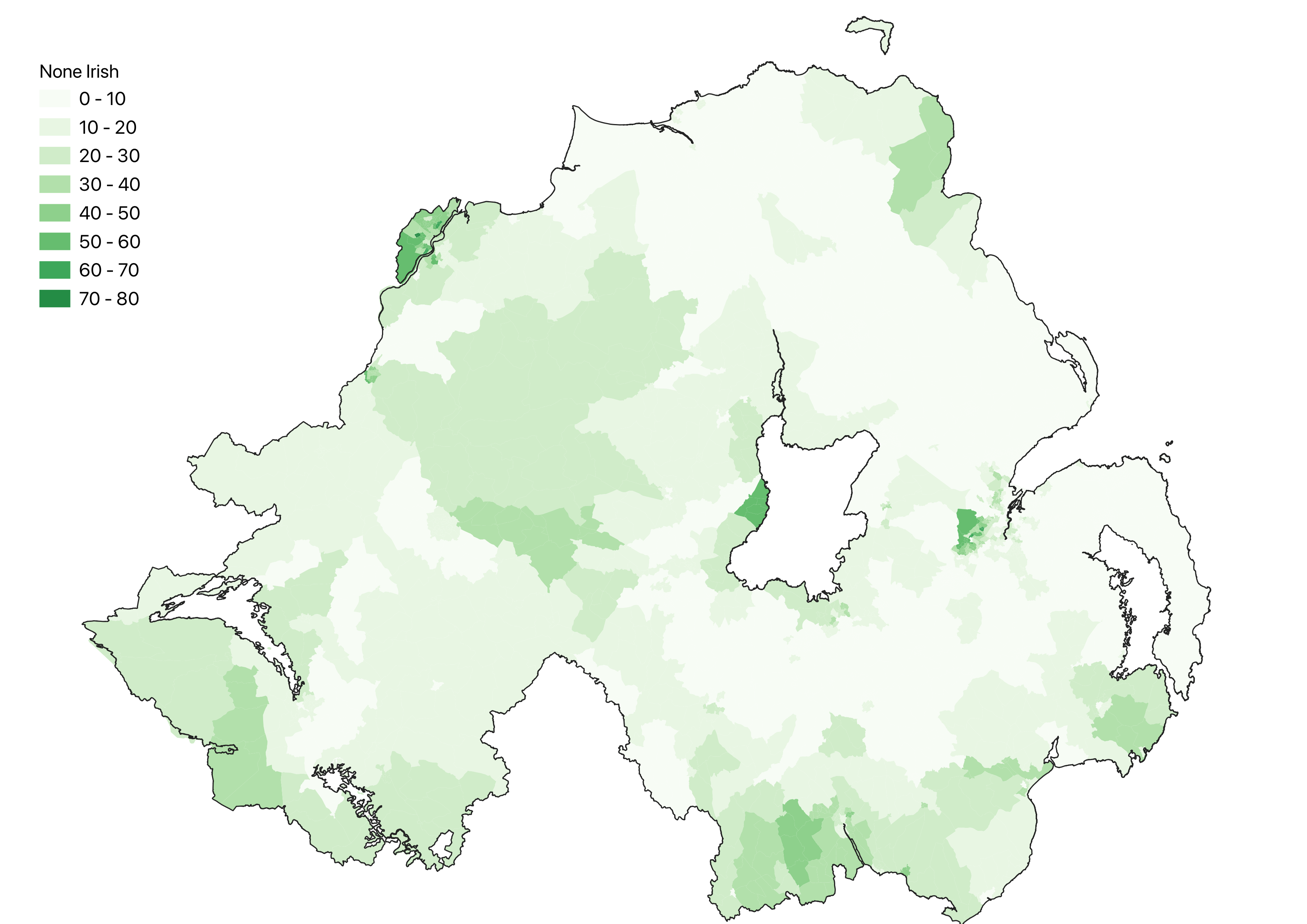
Percentage of those professing no religion identifying as Irish

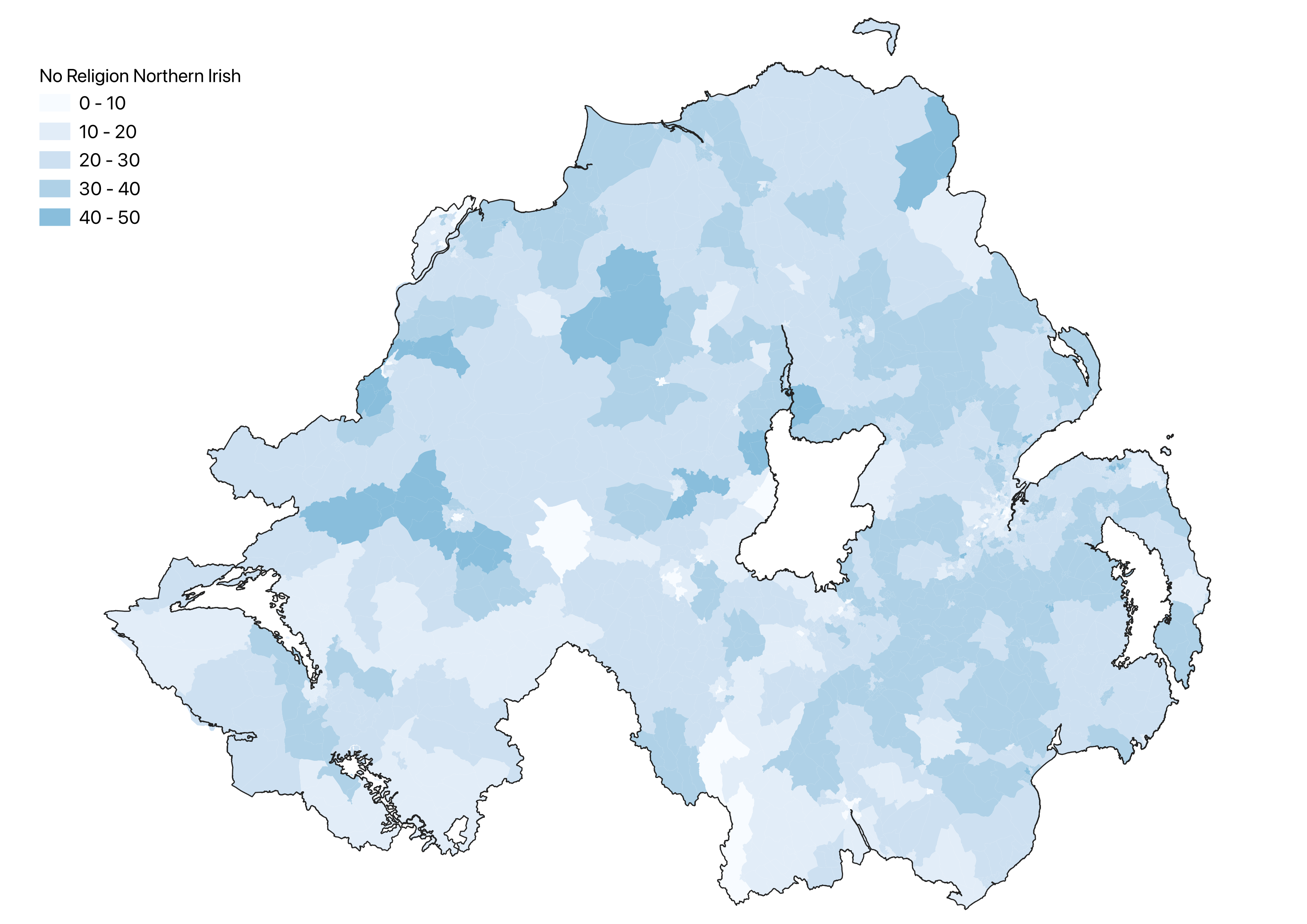
Percentage of those professing no religion identifying as Northern Irish

=== Changes from 2011 to 2021 ===
National Identity between 2011 and 2021

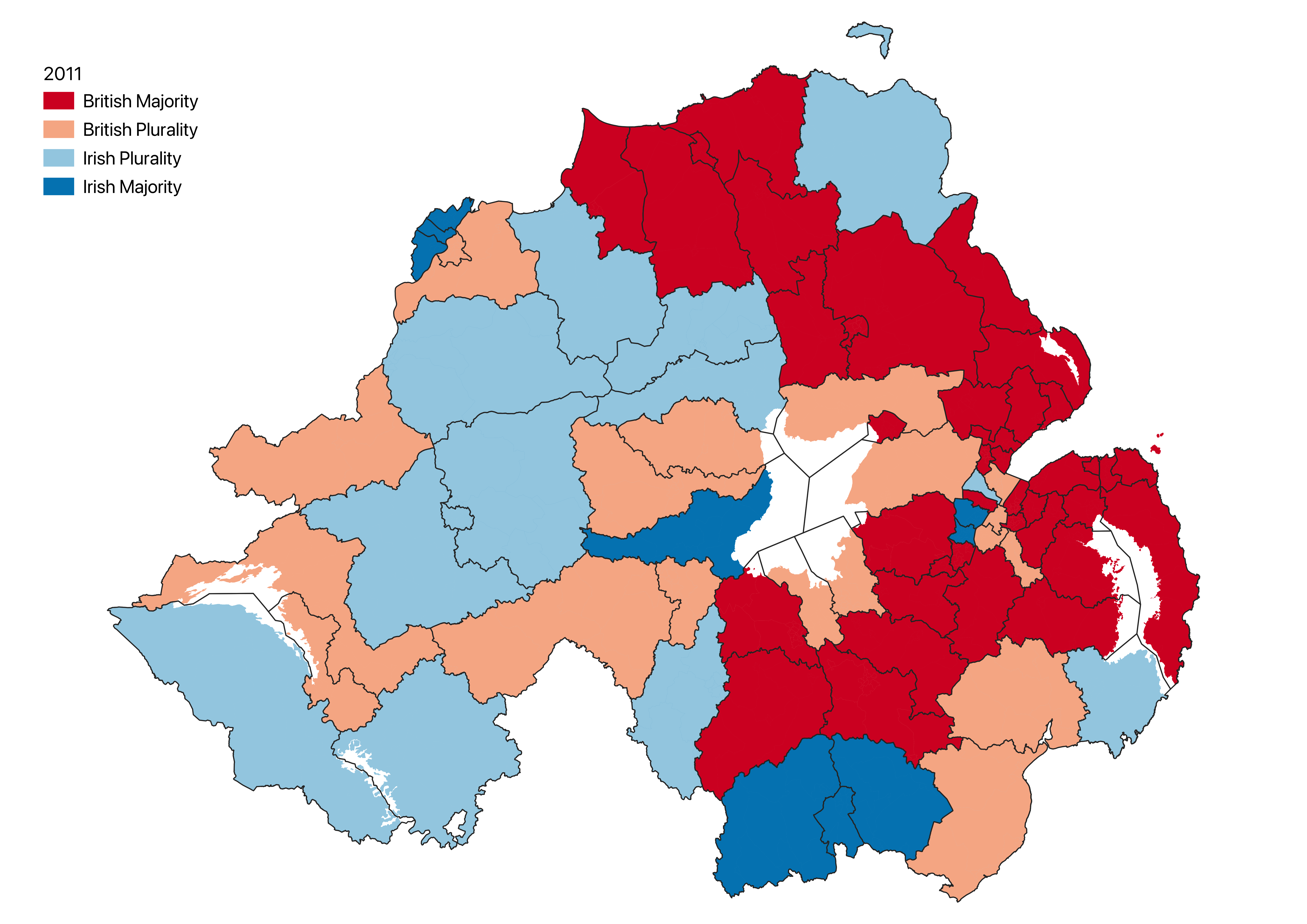
National Identity in Northern Ireland by Electoral Area 2011. British outnumbered Irish in 58 out of the 80 Electoral Areas. British is total of British Only plus British and Northern Irish, Irish is total of Irish Only plus Irish and Northern Irish

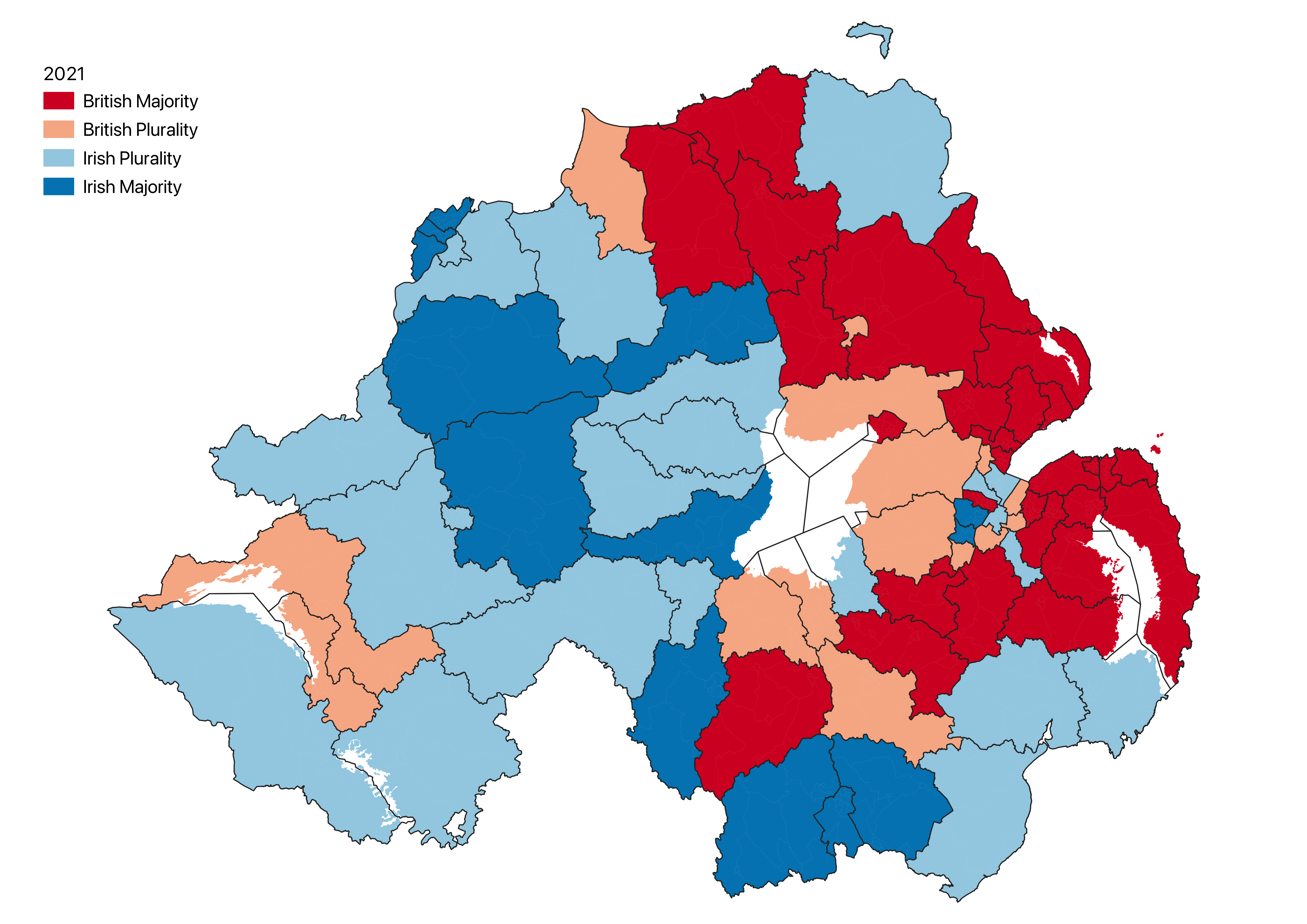
National Identity in Northern Ireland by Electoral Area 2021. British outnumbered Irish in 45 out of the 80 Electoral Areas

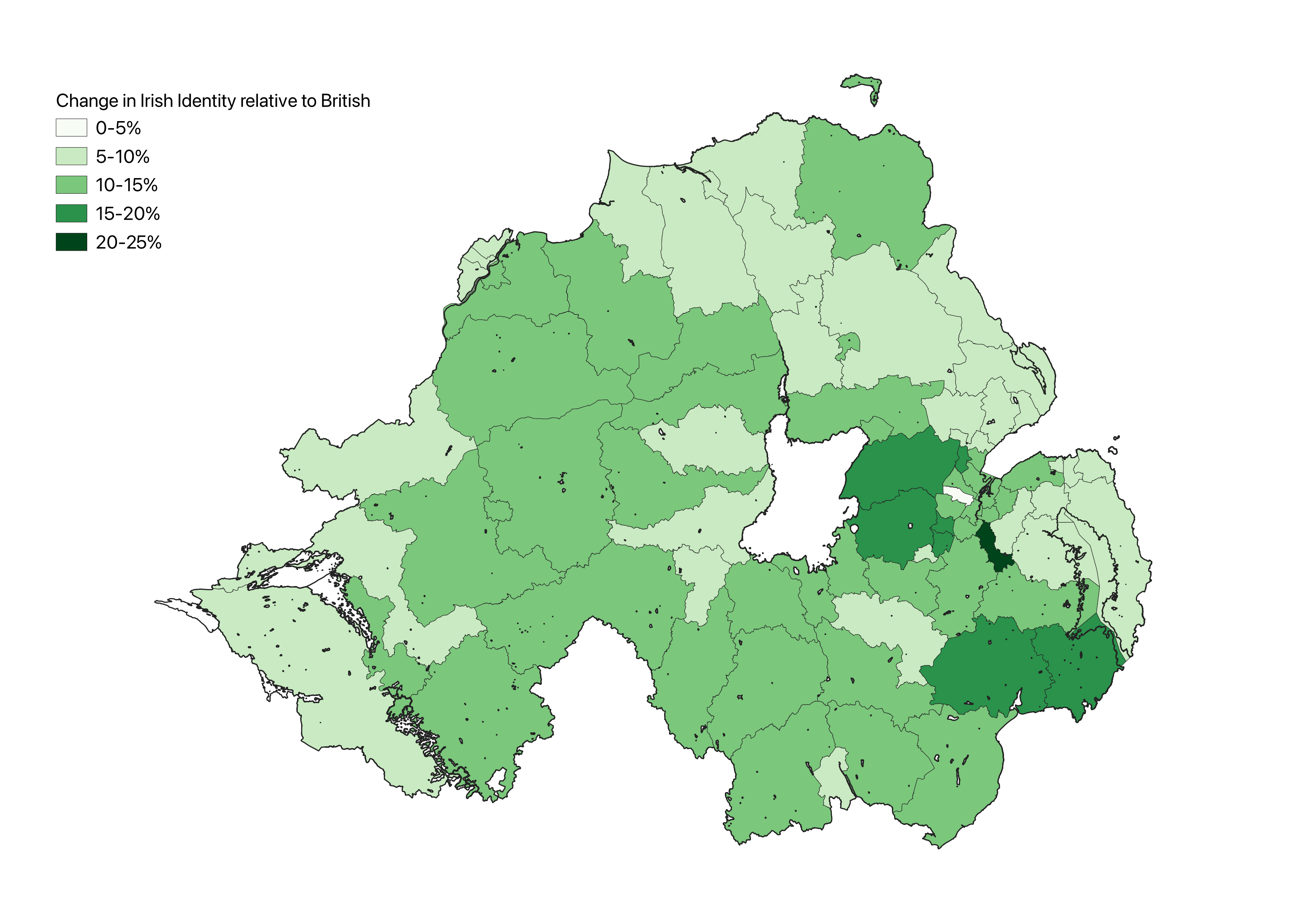
Swing from British to Irish identity by DEA (2014) from 2011 to 2021 censuses

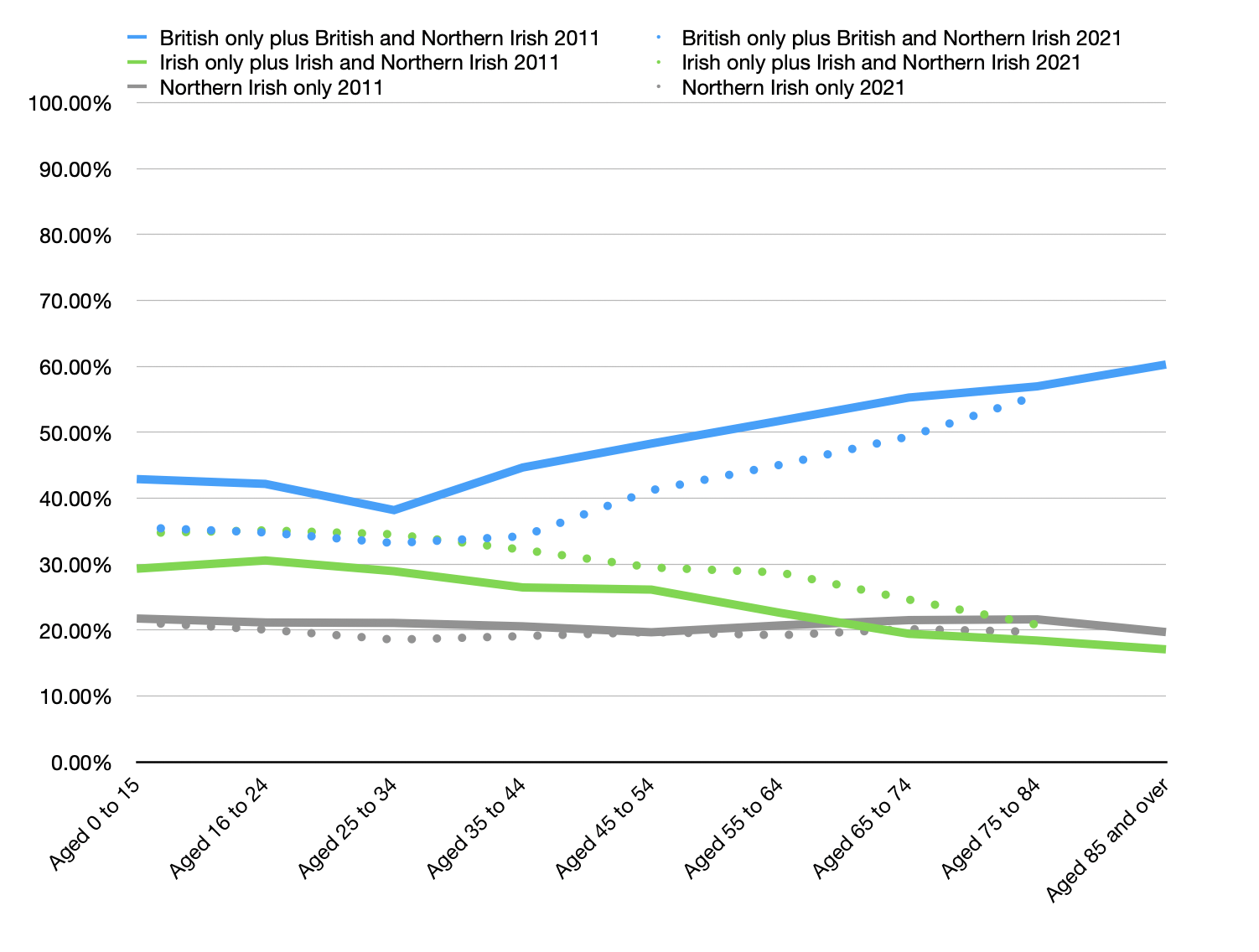
National identity by age in 2011 (solid line) and 2021 (dotted line) showing a narrowing in the gap from 2011

The following metrics account for over 90% of the population in both 2011 and 2021. National Identity showed a large shift from British to Irish of 10% between 2011 and 2021.

	2011	2021	Change
British Only	39.9%	31.9%	-8.0%
British And Northern Irish	6.2%	8.0%	+1.8%
Irish Only	25.3%	29.1%	+3.9%
Irish And Northern Irish	1.1%	1.8%	+0.7%
Northern Irish Only	20.9%	19.8%	-1.1%

All DEAs showed an increase in Irish National Identity relative to British, with the lowest increase (3%) in the Court DEA, and the largest increase (22%) in the Castlereagh South DEA. Generally the largest increases were in the east, in and around Belfast.

Between 2011 and 2021, Catholics seeing themselves as British fell from 13% to 9%, while Protestants seeing themselves as Irish increased from 4% to 4.8%.

The shift from British to Irish can be seen from the plot comparing the age groups from the 2011 census with the same age cohort in the 2021 census. There was a swing towards Irish across all age cohorts, but it was 12-13% among younger adults (under 35 in 2021), approximately 2-6% among 35-64 (in 2021) year olds, and a much smaller 0.8% in the oldest age cohort.

Age cohort changes between 2011 and 2021

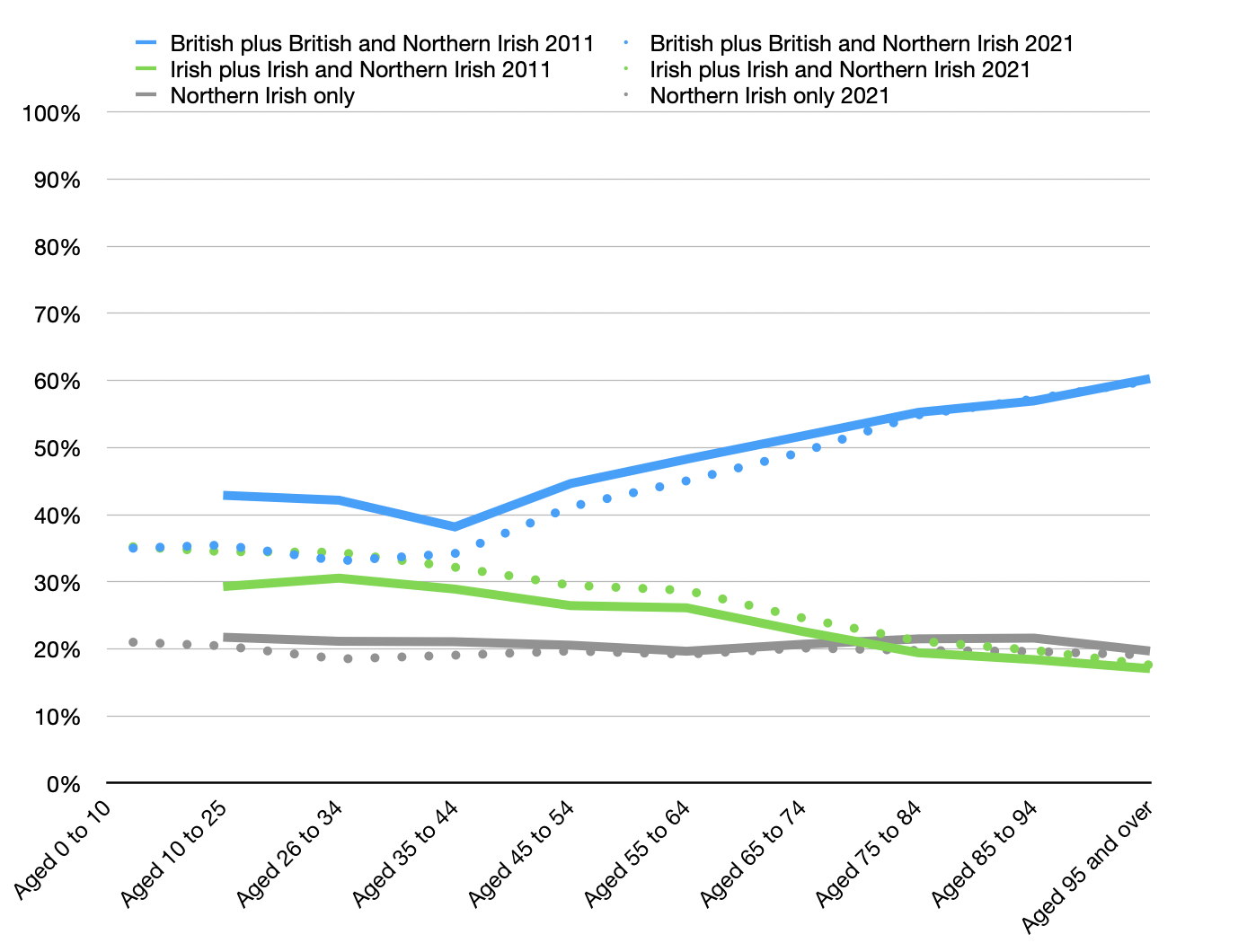
National Identity in 2011 and 2021, by same age cohort. For example, those in the 16-24 age group in 2011 are compared to the 26-34 age group in 2021

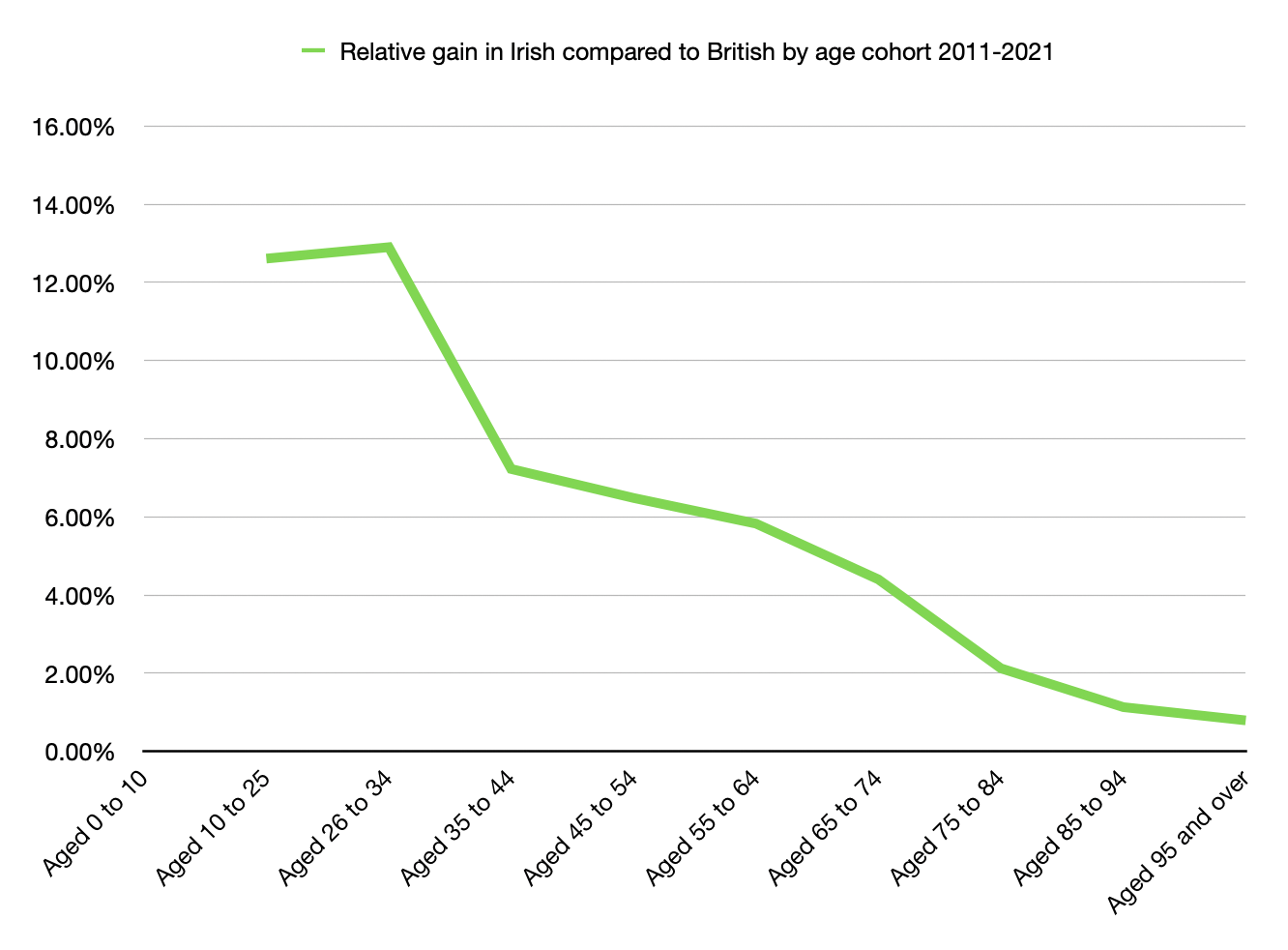
Swing from British to Irish by age cohort.

== Passports held ==
Passports held. Red is British and green is Irish.

The most commonly held passport according to the 2011 census. 1,070,413 British and 375,826 Irish passports were held.

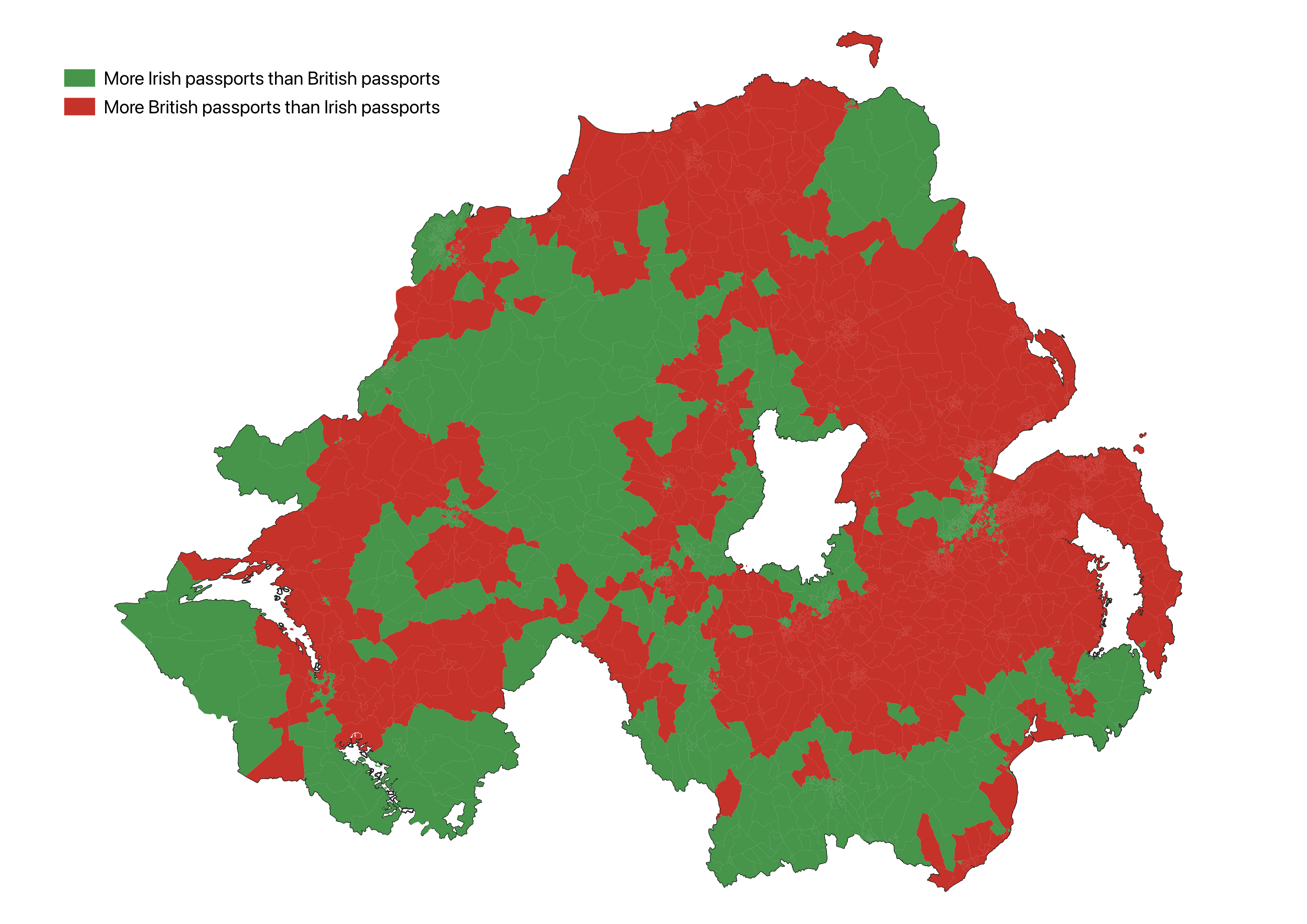
The most commonly held passport according to the 2021 census. 1,000,207 British and 614,251 Irish passports were held.

People born in Northern Ireland have automatic British citizenship on the same basis and with the same provisions as those born elsewhere in the United Kingdom. Despite the Irish Government's withdrawal of its constitutional claim to Northern Ireland in 1999, those born in Northern Ireland are entitled to Irish citizenship, should they so choose. Because of this entitlement most people in Northern Ireland are able to get both a British passport and an Irish Passport. Through an agreement between the Irish Government and Post Office Ltd, post offices in Northern Ireland provide a service where customers can apply for an Irish passport, alongside their service where customers can apply for a British passport.

Significantly more Irish passports (+11.4%) and fewer British passports (-6.5%) were held in 2021 compared to 2011. Catholics in particular gave up their British passports (-10.9%) and now hold Irish passports (+16.7%), but there was also a small drop in the percentage of Protestants with British passports (-0.4%) and large increase in Protestants with Irish passports (+6.5%). Similarly "Other" and "No religion" British passport holders fell by 8.3% and 4.9% respectively, and Irish passport holder increased by 5.6% and 6.9% respectively.

In the 2021 census, respondents stated that they held the following passports, compared to 2011.

Passport	All usual residents		Religion or religion brought up in							
Passport	All usual residents		Catholic		Protestant and other Christian		Other Religions		None	
Passport	2021	Change	2021	Change	2021	Change	2021	Change	2021	Change
No passport	15.9%	-3.0%	15.1%	-4.1%	16.0%	-2.5%	12.5%	-6.0%	19.6%	-0.6%
EU/EEA Countries	83.0%	+0.9%	84.3%	+1.9%	83.5%	+1.1%	64.8%	-4.5%	77.6%	-0.8%
United Kingdom	52.6%	-6.5%	27.5%	-10.9%	77.4%	-0.4%	47.7%	-8.3%	60.3%	-4.9%
Ireland	32.3%	+11.4%	57.2%	+16.7%	10.6%	+6.5%	15.6%	+5.6%	14.1%	+6.9%
Poland	1.3%	+0.3%	2.4%	0.4%	0.1%	0.0%	0.7%	+0.1%	0.9%	0.0%
Lithuania	0.6%	+0.2%	1.0%	+0.3%	0.1%	+0.1%	0.4%	+0.2%	1.2%	+0.4%
Other EU/EEA	1.9%	+1.1%	1.5%	+0.6%	1.3%	+0.9%	5.5%	+3.1%	5.7%	+1.5%
Other	1.1%	-0.1%	0.5%	-0.4%	0.6%	-0.1%	22.7%	-3.3%	2.8%	-0.7%

The following table shows the number of passport applications from within Northern Ireland since the 2021 census. 2024 numbers are up to 26 August 2024, and are not yet available broken down into first time or renewals.

In 2022, 34.8% of Irish passport applications were first time applications. In 2023 this rose to 38.2% of applications.

Irish passport applications from Northern Ireland
Year	First time applications Online	Renewals Online	Postal Applications	Total
2021				56,700
2022	32,719	61,423	16,730	110,872
2023	33,849	54,858	14,897	103,604
2024				128,669
2025				84,980

== Age ==
Population pyramid from 1971 to projections to 2050

According to the Northern Ireland Statistics and Research Authority the average (median) age increased from 34 years to 37 years between the 2001 and 2011 censuses. Over the same period, the share of the population represented by children aged under 16 years fell from 24 per cent to 21 per cent, while the proportion of people aged 65 years and over rose from 13 per cent to 15 per cent.

Population pyramids of each of Northern Ireland's Local Government Districts

Ards and North Down

Armagh City, Banbridge and Craigavon

Antrim and Newtownabbey

Belfast

Causeway Coast and Glens

Derry City and Strabane

Fermanagh and Omagh

Mid and East Antrim

Mid Ulster

Newry, Mourne and Down

Lisburn and Castlereagh

== Vital statistics ==
=== Vital statistics since 1900 ===
	Average population	Live births	Deaths	Natural change	Crude birth rate (per 1000)	Crude death rate (per 1000)	Natural change (per 1000)	Total fertility rate
1887		31,188	23,983	7,205				
1888		31,007	23,754	7,253				
1889		30,439	23,442	6,997				
1890		29,898	24,506	5,392				
1891		31,239	24,992	6,247				
1892		30,205	26,044	4,161				
1893		31,239	24,094	7,145				
1894		30,975	23,868	7,107				
1895		31,742	25,261	6,481				
1896		32,309	22,704	9,605				
1897		32,239	24,999	7,240				
1898		32,186	24,274	7,912				
1899		31,727	24,118	7,609				
1900		31,024	25,741	5,283				
1901		30,782	23,954	6,828				
1902		30,707	23,171	7,536				
1903		31,290	23,096	8,194				
1904		31,550	23,536	8,014				
1905		31,405	22,949	8,456				
1906		31,389	23,039	8,350				
1907		30,969	23,754	7,215				
1908		30,600	23,133	7,467				
1909		30,640	22,275	8,365				
1910	1,246,000	30,219	22,576	7,643	24.3	18.1	6.1	
1911	1,249,000	30,407	21,326	9,081	24.3	17.1	7.3	
1912	1,248,000	30,301	21,698	8,603	24.3	17.4	6.9	
1913	1,243,000	29,880	22,510	7,370	24.0	18.1	5.9	
1914	1,242,000	29,704	21,671	8,033	23.9	17.4	6.5	
1915	1,210,000	28,082	22,438	5,644	23.2	18.5	4.7	
1916	1,205,000	26,623	20,764	5,859	22.1	17.2	4.9	
1917	1,208,000	24,949	21,011	3,938	20.7	17.4	3.3	
1918	1,214,000	26,212	25,013	1,199	21.6	20.6	1.0	
1919	1,250,000	27,496	22,836	4,660	22.0	18.2	3.8	
1920	1,258,000	32,521	21,017	11,504	25.8	16.7	9.1	
1921	1,264,000	29,710	19,301	10,409	23.7	15.4	8.3	
1922	1,269,000	29,531	19,795	9,736	23.2	15.6	7.6	
1923	1,259,000	30,097	18,790	11,307	23.9	14.9	9.1	
1924	1,258,000	28,496	20,299	8,197	22.7	16.1	6.5	
1925	1,257,000	27,686	19,784	7,902	22.0	15.8	6.3	
1926	1,254,000	28,162	18,827	9,335	22.5	15.1	7.4	
1927	1,250,000	26,676	18,216	8,460	21.4	14.6	6.8	
1928	1,247,000	25,963	18,004	7,959	20.9	14.4	6.4	
1929	1,240,000	25,410	19,822	5,588	20.5	16.0	4.4	
1930	1,237,000	25,879	17,148	8,731	20.9	13.9	7.0	
1931	1,243,000	25,673	18,049	7,624	20.7	14.5	6.2	
1932	1,251,000	25,107	17,812	7,295	20.1	14.2	5.8	
1933	1,258,000	24,601	18,154	6,447	19.6	14.5	5.1	
1934	1,265,000	25,365	17,521	7,844	20.1	13.9	6.2	
1935	1,271,000	24,742	18,592	6,150	19.5	14.6	4.8	
1936	1,276,000	25,909	18,429	7,480	20.3	14.4	5.9	
1937	1,281,000	25,412	19,282	6,130	19.8	15.1	4.8	
1938	1,286,000	25,742	17,649	8,093	20.0	13.7	6.3	
1939	1,295,000	25,240	17,542	7,698	19.5	13.5	5.9	
1940	1,299,000	25,363	18,941	6,422	19.5	14.6	4.9	
1941	1,308,000	26,887	20,034	6,853	20.6	15.3	5.2	
1942	1,329,000	29,645	17,570	12,075	22.3	13.2	9.1	
1943	1,341,000	31,521	17,720	13,801	23.5	13.2	10.3	
1944	1,357,000	30,900	16,980	13,920	22.8	12.5	10.3	
1945	1,359,000	29,007	16,432	12,575	21.3	12.1	9.3	
1946	1,350,000	30,134	16,706	13,428	22.3	12.4	9.9	
1947	1,350,000	31,254	16,944	14,310	23.2	12.6	10.6	
1948	1,362,000	29,532	15,145	14,387	21.7	11.1	10.6	
1949	1,371,000	29,106	15,670	13,436	21.2	11.4	9.8	
1950	1,377,000	28,794	15,839	12,955	20.9	11.5	9.4	
1951	1,373,000	28,477	17,628	10,849	20.7	12.8	7.9	
1952	1,375,000	28,760	14,812	13,948	20.9	10.8	10.1	
1953	1,384,000	28,984	14,813	14,171	20.9	10.7	10.2	
1954	1,387,000	28,803	15,124	13,679	20.8	10.9	9.9	
1955	1,394,000	28,965	15,407	13,558	20.8	11.1	9.7	
1956	1,397,000	29,489	14,858	14,631	21.1	10.6	10.5	
1957	1,399,000	30,108	15,187	14,921	21.5	10.9	10.7	
1958	1,402,000	30,301	15,132	15,169	21.6	10.8	10.8	
1959	1,408,000	30,809	15,403	15,406	21.9	10.9	10.9	
1960	1,420,000	31,989	15,296	16,693	22.5	10.8	11.8	
1961	1,427,000	31,915	16,108	15,807	22.4	11.3	11.1	
1962	1,435,000	32,565	15,226	17,339	22.7	10.6	12.1	
1963	1,446,000	33,414	15,899	17,515	23.1	11.0	12.1	
1964	1,458,000	34,345	15,354	18,991	23.6	10.5	13.0	
1965	1,469,000	33,890	15,551	18,339	23.1	10.6	12.5	
1966	1,478,000	33,228	16,441	16,787	22.5	11.1	11.4	
1967	1,491,000	33,415	14,671	18,744	22.4	9.8	12.6	
1968	1,502,000	33,173	15,933	17,240	22.1	10.6	11.5	
1969	1,513,000	32,428	16,338	16,090	21.4	10.8	10.6	
1970	1,525,000	32,086	16,551	15,535	21.0	10.9	10.2	
1971	1,540,000	31,765	16,202	15,563	20.6	10.5	10.1	
1972	1,539,000	29,994	17,032	12,962	19.5	11.1	8.4	
1973	1,530,000	29,200	17,669	11,531	19.1	11.5	7.5	
1974	1,527,000	27,160	17,327	9,833	17.8	11.3	6.4	
1975	1,524,000	26,130	16,511	9,619	17.2	10.8	6.4	
1976	1,524,000	26,361	17,030	9,331	17.3	11.2	6.1	
1977	1,523,000	25,437	16,921	8,516	16.7	11.1	5.6	
1978	1,523,000	26,239	16,153	10,086	17.2	10.6	6.6	
1979	1,528,000	28,178	16,811	11,367	18.4	11.0	7.4	
1980	1,533,000	28,582	16,835	11,747	18.6	11.0	7.7	
1981	1,543,000	27,166	16,256	10,910	17.6	10.5	7.1	2.79
1982	1,545,000	26,872	15,918	10,954	17.4	10.3	7.1	2.59
1983	1,551,000	27,026	16,039	10,987	17.4	10.3	7.1	2.53
1984	1,557,000	27,477	15,692	11,785	17.6	10.1	7.5	2.51
1985	1,565,000	27,427	15,955	11,472	17.5	10.2	7.3	2.50
1986	1,574,000	27,975	16,065	11,910	17.8	10.2	7.6	2.45
1987	1,582,000	27,653	15,334	12,319	17.5	9.7	7.8	2.44
1988	1,585,000	27,514	15,813	11,701	17.4	10.0	7.4	2.39
1989	1,590,000	25,831	15,844	9,987	16.2	10.0	6.2	2.35
1990	1,596,000	26,251	15,426	10,825	16.5	9.7	6.8	2.19
1991	1,607,000	26,028	15,096	10,932	16.2	9.4	6.9	2.21
1992	1,623,000	25,354	14,988	10,366	15.6	9.2	6.4	2.16
1993	1,636,000	24,722	15,633	9,089	15.1	9.6	5.5	2.08
1994	1,644,000	24,098	15,114	8,984	14.7	9.2	5.5	2.01
1995	1,649,000	23,693	15,310	8,383	14.4	9.3	5.1	1.95
1996	1,662,000	24,382	15,218	9,164	14.7	9.2	5.5	1.91
1997	1,671,000	24,087	14,971	9,116	14.4	9.0	5.4	1.95
1998	1,678,000	23,668	14,993	8,675	14.1	8.9	5.2	1.93
1999	1,679,000	22,957	15,663	7,294	13.7	9.3	4.3	1.90
2000	1,683,000	21,512	14,903	6,609	12.8	8.9	3.9	1.86
2001	1,689,000	21,962	14,513	7,449	13.0	8.6	4.4	1.75
2002	1,697,000	21,385	14,586	6,799	12.6	8.6	4.0	1.81
2003	1,703,000	21,648	14,462	7,186	12.7	8.5	4.2	1.76
2004	1,710,000	22,318	14,354	7,964	13.0	8.4	4.7	1.79
2005	1,724,000	22,328	14,224	8,104	12.9	8.2	4.7	1.84
2006	1,742,000	23,272	14,532	8,740	13.4	8.3	5.0	1.84
2007	1,759,000	24,451	14,649	9,802	13.9	8.3	5.6	1.90
2008	1,775,000	25,631	14,907	10,724	14.4	8.4	6.0	1.98
2009	1,789,000	24,910	14,413	10,497	13.9	8.1	5.8	2.05
2010	1,799,000	25,315	14,457	10,858	14.1	8.0	6.1	2.02
2011	1,809,000	25,273	14,204	11,069	14.0	7.8	6.2	2.02
2012	1,820,000	25,269	14,756	10,513	14.0	8.1	5.9	2.03
2013	1,830,000	24,277	14,968	9,309	13.3	8.2	5.1	1.95
2014	1,840,000	24,394	14,678	9,716	13.3	8.0	5.3	1.96
2015	1,851,000	24,215	15,553	8,662	13.1	8.4	4.7	1.94
2016	1,862,000	24,076	15,430	8,646	12.9	8.3	4.6	1.93
2017	1,871,000	23,075	16,036	7,039	12.3	8.6	3.7	1.85
2018	1,882,000	22,829	15,923	6,906	12.1	8.5	3.6	1.83
2019	1,893,700	22,447	15,758	6,689	11.9	8.3	3.6	1.80
2020	1,896,000	20,815	17,614	3,201	11.0	9.3	1.7	1.68
2021	1,903,175	22,071	17,558	4,513	11.6	9.2	2.4	1.79
2022	1,910,500	20,837	17,159	3,678	10.9	9.0	1.9	1.71
2023	1,920,400	19,962	17,254	2,708	10.4	9.0	1.4	1.64
2024	1,927,900	19,419	18,050	1,369	10.1	9.4	0.7	1.62
2025	1,928,400	19,070	17,755	1,315	9.9	9.2	0.7	

=== Current vital statistics ===
Period	Live births	Deaths	Natural increase
January—October 2025	16,207	14,748	+1,459
January—October 2026	16,009	14,511	+1,498
Difference	▼ –198 (–1.2%)	▼ –237 (–1.6%)	▲ +39

== See also ==
- Demographics of the Republic of Ireland
- Demographics of the United Kingdom
  - Demographics of England
  - Demographics of Scotland
  - Demographics of Wales
- Politics of Northern Ireland
