= 2005 Northern Ireland local elections =

- 5 May 2005

All 582 council seats
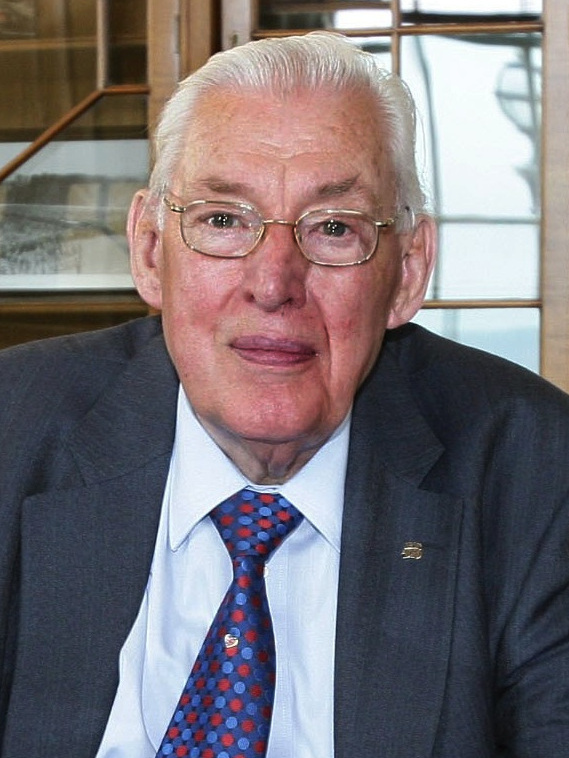

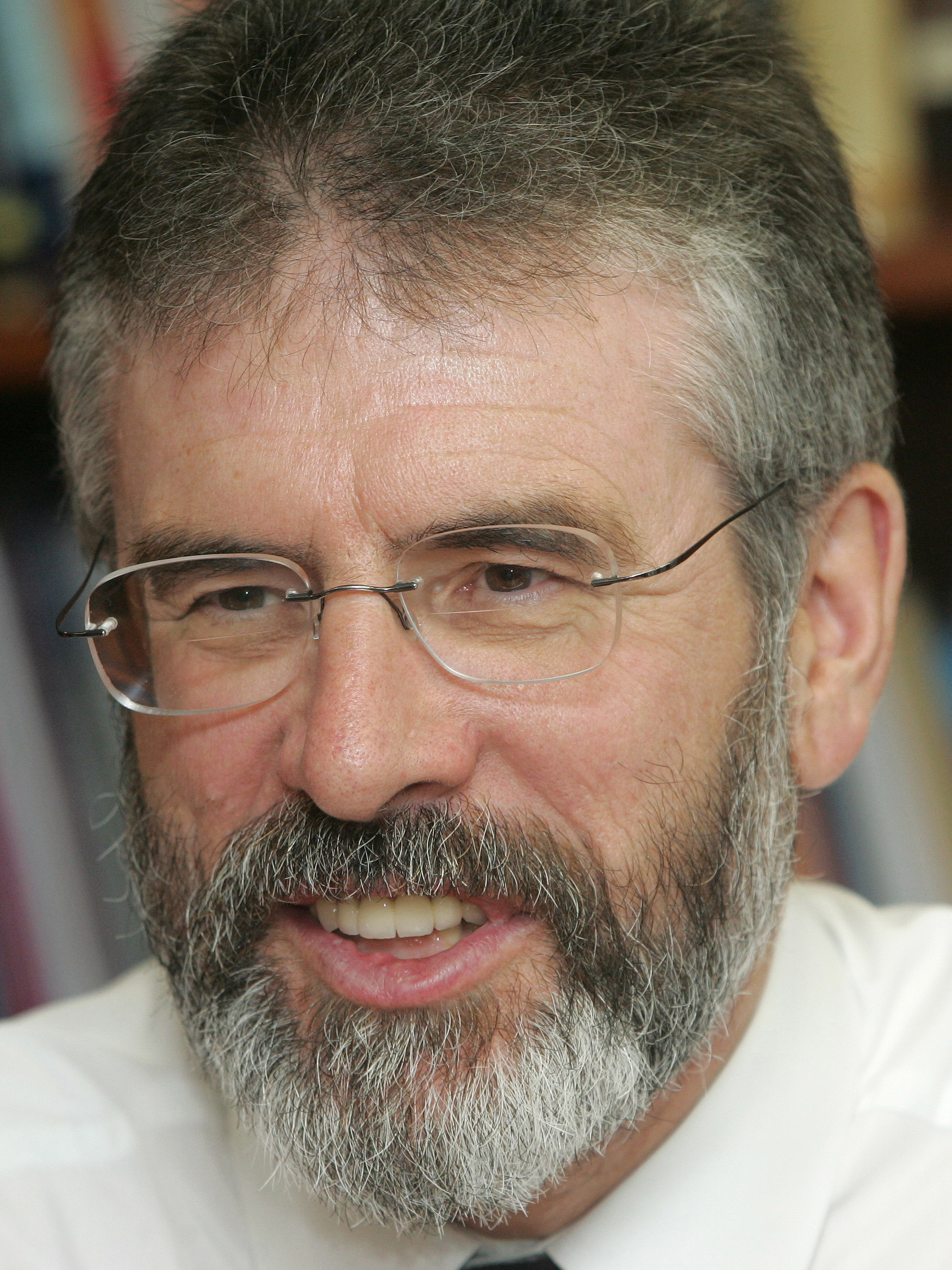

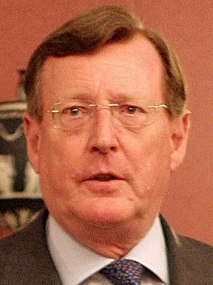

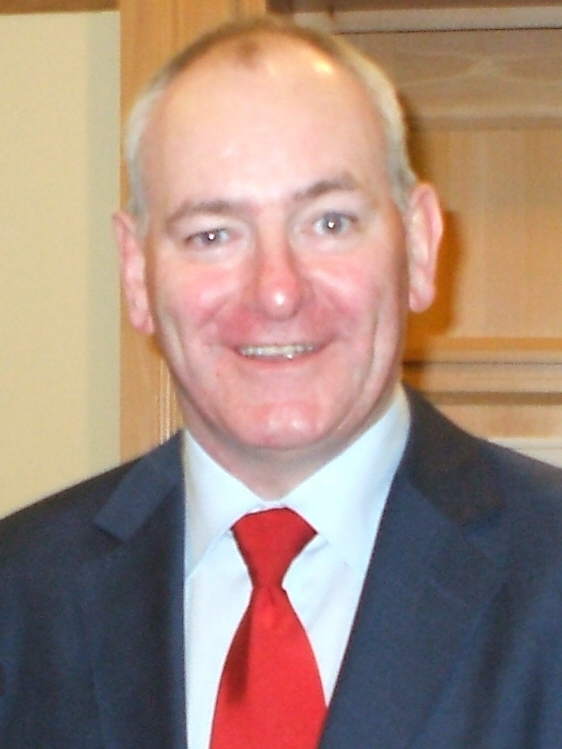

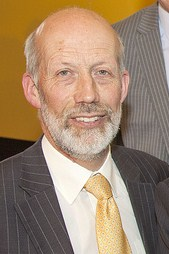

| | First party | Second party | Third party |
|---|---|---|---|
| Leader | Ian Paisley | Gerry Adams | David Trimble |
| Party | DUP | Sinn Féin | UUP |
| Seats won | 182 | 126 | 115 |
| Seat change | ▲51 | ▲18 | ▼39 |
| First Preference vote | 208,278 | 163,205 | 126,317 |
| Percentage | 29.6% | 23.2% | 18.0% |
| Swing | ▲8.2% | ▲2.5% | ▼4.9% |
| | Fourth party | Fifth party | Sixth party |
| Leader | Mark Durkan | David Ford | N/A |
| Party | SDLP | Alliance | Independent |
| Seats won | 101 | 30 | 20 |
| Seat change | ▼16 | ▲2 | ▼14 |
| First Preference vote | 121,991 | 35,149 | 27,677 |
| Percentage | 17.4% | 5.0% | 4.0% |
| Swing | ▼2.0% | ▼0.1% | ▼2.6% |
- Colours denote the winning party with outright control over each council

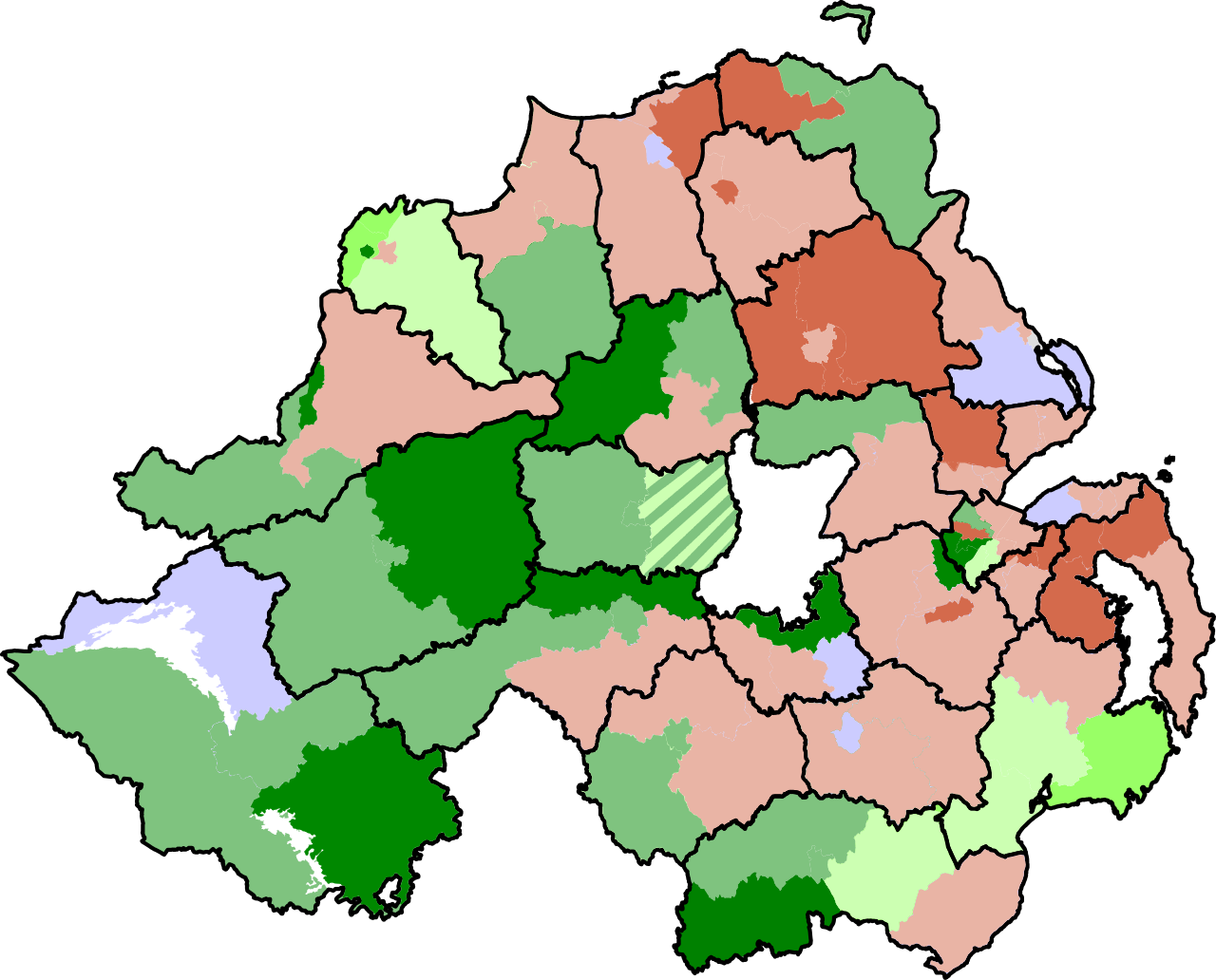
- Colours denote the party with a plurality of first preference votes in each District Electoral Area (in darker-coloured DEAs, the party has a majority of first preference votes)

Elections for local government were held in Northern Ireland on 5 May 2005, contesting 582 seats in all, along with the 2005 general election across the entire United Kingdom and local elections in England.

== Results ==
| Party | Councillors | | Votes | |
| Party | Change | Total | % share | Total |
|---|---|---|---|---|
| DUP | +51 | 182 | 29.6 | 208,278 |
| Sinn Féin | +18 | 126 | 23.2 | 163,205 |
| UUP | -39 | 115 | 18.0 | 126,317 |
| SDLP | -16 | 101 | 17.4 | 121,991 |
| Alliance | +2 | 30 | 5.0 | 35,149 |
| Independent | -14 | 20 | 4.0 | 27,677 |
| Green (NI) | +3 | 3 | 0.8 | 5,703 |
| PUP | -2 | 2 | 0.7 | 4,591 |
| United Unionist | 0 | 2 | 0.3 | 2,064 |
| Newtownabbey Ratepayers | 0 | 1 | 0.3 | 1,897 |
| Socialist Environmental | 0 | 0 | 0.2 | 1,321 |
| NI Conservatives | 0 | 0 | 0.2 | 1,164 |
| Workers' Party | 0 | 0 | 0.1 | 1,052 |
| Socialist Party | 0 | 0 | 0.1 | 828 |
| NI Women's Coalition | -1 | 0 | 0.1 | 738 |
| UK Unionist | -2 | 0 | 0.1 | 734 |

=== By council ===
| Council | Council Seats by Party | | | | | | | | | |
| Council | | | | | | | | | | Total |
| Council | Alliance | DUP | Green | PUP | SDLP | SF | UUP | Others | Ind. | Total |
|---|---|---|---|---|---|---|---|---|---|---|
| Antrim | 2 | 6 | – | – | 3 | 3 | 5 | – | – | 19 |
| Ards | 3 | 12 | – | – | 1 | – | 7 | – | – | 23 |
| Armagh | – | 6 | – | – | 6 | 5 | 5 | – | – | 22 |
| Ballymena | – | 14 | – | – | 3 | 1 | 5 | – | 1 | 24 |
| Ballymoney | – | 8 | – | – | 2 | 3 | 2 | – | 1 | 16 |
| Banbridge | 1 | 7 | – | – | 3 | 1 | 5 | – | – | 17 |
| Belfast | 4 | 15 | – | 2 | 8 | 14 | 7 | – | 1 | 51 |
| Carrickfergus | 3 | 8 | – | – | – | – | 4 | – | 2 | 17 |
| Castlereagh | 4 | 13 | – | – | 2 | – | 4 | – | – | 23 |
| Coleraine | – | 9 | – | – | 3 | 1 | 8 | – | 1 | 22 |
| Cookstown | – | 3 | – | – | 5 | 5 | 3 | – | – | 16 |
| Craigavon | – | 9 | – | – | 4 | 6 | 6 | – | 1 | 26 |
| Derry | – | 5 | – | – | 14 | 10 | 1 | – | – | 30 |
| Down | – | 3 | 1 | | 10 | 5 | 4 | – | – | 23 |
| Dungannon | – | 5 | – | – | 4 | 9 | 4 | – | – | 22 |
| Fermanagh | – | 4 | – | – | 5 | 9 | 5 | – | – | 23 |
| Larne | 2 | 5 | – | – | 2 | – | 4 | – | 2 | 15 |
| Limavady | – | 3 | – | – | 3 | 6 | 2 | 1 UUC | – | 15 |
| Lisburn | 3 | 13 | – | – | 3 | 4 | 7 | – | – | 30 |
| Magherafelt | – | 4 | – | – | 2 | 8 | 2 | – | – | 16 |
| Moyle | – | 2 | – | – | 3 | 4 | 3 | – | 3 | 15 |
| Newry and Mourne | – | 2 | 1 | – | 9 | 13 | 3 | – | 2 | 30 |
| Newtownabbey | 2 | 12 | – | – | 1 | 1 | 6 | 2 (1 UUC; 1 NR) | 1 | 25 |
| North Down | 6 | 8 | 1 | | – | – | 8 | – | 2 | 25 |
| Omagh | – | 3 | – | – | 3 | 10 | 3 | – | 2 | 21 |
| Strabane | – | 3 | – | – | 2 | 8 | 2 | – | – | 16 |
| Total | 30 | 182 | 3 | 2 | 101 | 126 | 115 | 3 | 20 | 582 |
| Change | +2 | +51 | +3 | -2 | -16 | +18 | -39 | -3 | -14 | -2 UKU -1 NIWC |
| Elected 2001 | 28 | 131 | – | 4 | 117 | 108 | 154 | 6 | 34 | 2 UKU; 2 UU; 1 NR; 1 NIWC |

== Councils ==
=== Antrim ===
Election results, shaded by plurality of First Preference Votes

Antrim North West
| Party | Candidate | 1st Pref |
|---|---|---|
| SDLP | Robert Loughran | 1,008 |
| Sinn Féin | Henry Cushinan | 875 |
| UUP | Stephen Nicholl | 734 |
| DUP | Trevor Clarke | 696 |
| Sinn Féin | Anthony Brady | 621 |
| DUP | Wilson Clyde | 598 |
| SDLP | Donovan McClelland | 418 |
| Independent | Brian Johnston | 225 |
| Turnout | | 5,315 |
| Sinn Féin gain from SDLP | | |

Antrim South East
| Party | Candidate | 1st Pref |
|---|---|---|
| SDLP | Thomas Burns | 1,435 |
| DUP | Samuel Dunlop | 1,066 |
| UUP | Danny Kinahan | 904 |
| UUP | Mervyn Rea | 793 |
| DUP | Mel Lucas | 603 |
| Alliance | Alan Lawther | 598 |
| DUP | Roy Thompson | 513 |
| Sinn Féin | Annemarie Logue | 452 |
| DUP | William Harkness | 309 |
| UUP | Kenneth Swann | 271 |
| Sinn Féin | Bernard McCrory | 197 |
| Independent | Patricia Murray | 49 |
| Turnout | | 7,294 |
| Alliance gain from UUP | | |

Antrim Town
| Party | Candidate | 1st Pref |
|---|---|---|
| DUP | John Smyth | 705 |
| UUP | Adrian Cochrane-Watson | 669 |
| Alliance | David Ford | 616 |
| DUP | Pam Lewis | 479 |
| Sinn Féin | Gerard Magee | 475 |
| DUP | Brian Graham | 465 |
| SDLP | Oran Keenan | 427 |
| UUP | Drew Ritchie | 423 |
| UUP | Paul Michael | 371 |
| SDLP | Brian Duffin | 345 |
| Independent | Darran Smyth | 136 |
| PUP | Kenneth Wilkinson | 110 |
| UUP | James Sands | 38 |
| Independent | Áine Gribbon | 28 |
| Turnout | | 5,410 |
| DUP gain from UUP | | |
| Alliance gain from SDLP | | |

=== Ards ===
Election results, shaded by plurality of First Preference Votes

Ards East
| Party | Candidate | 1st Pref |
|---|---|---|
| DUP | Jonathan Bell | 1,515 |
| DUP | Terence Williams | 994 |
| UUP | Ronnie Ferguson | 993 |
| DUP | Hamilton Gregory | 943 |
| Alliance | Linda Cleland | 850 |
| DUP | Colville Elliott | 814 |
| UUP | Jeffrey Magill | 624 |
| UUP | Tom Smith | 560 |
| Green (NI) | John McCullough | 182 |
| Independent | Thomas Sheridan | 132 |
| Turnout | | 7,788 |
| DUP gain from UUP and Alliance | | |

Ards Peninsula
| Party | Candidate | 1st Pref |
|---|---|---|
| DUP | Jim Shannon | 1,944 |
| Alliance | Kieran McCarthy | 990 |
| SDLP | Joe Boyle | 913 |
| UUP | Angus Carson | 703 |
| DUP | Robin Drysdale | 663 |
| DUP | Colin Kennedy | 408 |
| Sinn Féin | Anthony Lacken | 292 |
| Independent | Danny McCarthy | 270 |
| Turnout | | 6,313 |
No change

Ards West
| Party | Candidate | 1st Pref |
|---|---|---|
| DUP | Margaret Craig | 1,227 |
| Alliance | James McBriar | 1,070 |
| UUP | Robert Gibson | 984 |
| DUP | William Montgomery | 959 |
| DUP | Mervyn Oswald | 880 |
| UUP | James Fletcher | 796 |
| DUP | David Gilmore | 645 |
| UUP | Philip Smith | 446 |
| Turnout | | 7,147 |
No change

Newtownards
| Party | Candidate | 1st Pref |
|---|---|---|
| DUP | George Ennis | 1,296 |
| Alliance | Alan McDowell | 823 |
| UUP | Tom Hamilton | 736 |
| UUP | David Smyth | 651 |
| DUP | Michelle Mcilveen | 623 |
| Independent | Wilbert Magill | 604 |
| DUP | Hamilton Lawther | 496 |
| DUP | Simon Hamilton | 490 |
| Turnout | | 5,849 |
| DUP gain from Independent | | |

=== Armagh ===
Election results, shaded by plurality of First Preference Votes

Armagh City
| Party | Candidate | 1st Pref |
|---|---|---|
| DUP | Freda Donnelly | 1,004 |
| SDLP | Pat Brannigan | 932 |
| UUP | Sylvia McRoberts | 931 |
| Sinn Féin | Cathy Rafferty | 898 |
| Sinn Féin | Noel Sheridan | 639 |
| Independent | John Nixon | 591 |
| Sinn Féin | John Crowley | 491 |
| SDLP | Mealla Bratton | 468 |
| SDLP | Michael Carson | 334 |
| Turnout | | 6,407 |
No change

Crossmore
| Party | Candidate | 1st Pref |
|---|---|---|
| DUP | Noel Donnelly | 922 |
| SDLP | Thomas O'Hanlon | 891 |
| Sinn Féin | Cathal Boylan | 864 |
| Sinn Féin | Pat O'Rawe | 850 |
| UUP | Billy Morton | 810 |
| Sinn Féin | Willie Monaghan | 643 |
| SDLP | Gerald Mallon | 605 |
| SDLP | James Lennon | 545 |
| Turnout | | 6,245 |
| DUP gain from UUP | | |

Cusher
| Party | Candidate | 1st Pref |
|---|---|---|
| DUP | Paul Berry | 3,263 |
| UUP | Eric Speers | 1,296 |
| SDLP | Sharon Haughey | 794 |
| UUP | Robert Turner | 698 |
| Sinn Féin | Siobhan Vallely | 655 |
| UUP | James Clayton | 450 |
| DUP | Gareth Wilson | 332 |
| Independent | Paul Bowbanks | 324 |
| DUP | Margaret Black | 249 |
| Turnout | | 8,186 |
| DUP gain from UUP | | |

The Orchard
| Party | Candidate | 1st Pref |
|---|---|---|
| DUP | William Irwin | 1,809 |
| UUP | Jim Speers | 1,219 |
| Sinn Féin | Paul Corrigan | 1,194 |
| SDLP | John Campbell | 1,136 |
| UUP | Charles Rollston | 718 |
| DUP | Robert Steenson | 381 |
| Turnout | | 6,552 |
No change

=== Ballymena ===
Election results, shaded by plurality of First Preference Votes

Ballymena North
| Party | Candidate | 1st Pref |
|---|---|---|
| DUP | James Alexander | 1,503 |
| DUP | Maurice Mills | 930 |
| Independent | James Henry | 906 |
| SDLP | Patrick McAvoy | 755 |
| UUP | Neil Armstrong | 656 |
| DUP | John Carson | 566 |
| UUP | Joe McKernan | 431 |
| Alliance | Jayne Dunlop | 404 |
| UUP | Peter Brown | 370 |
| Sinn Féin | Padraig McShane | 341 |
| Turnout | | 6,963 |
| DUP gain from Independent | | |

Ballymena South
| Party | Candidate | 1st Pref |
|---|---|---|
| DUP | Beth Adger | 960 |
| DUP | Davy Tweed | 792 |
| DUP | Martin Clarke | 777 |
| DUP | Hubert Nicholl | 745 |
| SDLP | Declan O'Loan | 718 |
| UUP | James Currie | 674 |
| Sinn Féin | Daniel O'Connell | 346 |
| DUP | Deirdre Nelson | 346 |
| UUP | Robin Swann | 246 |
| UUP | Colette Gilmour | 209 |
| PUP | William McCaughey | 94 |
| Turnout | | 6,046 |
| DUP gain from UUP | | |

Bannside
| Party | Candidate | 1st Pref |
|---|---|---|
| DUP | Roy Gillespie | 1,664 |
| UUP | William McNeilly | 1,373 |
| DUP | Sam Gaston | 978 |
| DUP | Tommy Nicholl | 959 |
| DUP | William Wilkinson | 919 |
| Sinn Féin | Monica Digney | 733 |
| SDLP | Seamus Laverty | 626 |
| Turnout | | 7,344 |
| Sinn Féin gain from SDLP | | |

Braid
| Party | Candidate | 1st Pref |
|---|---|---|
| DUP | Paul Frew | 1,524 |
| DUP | Sam Hanna | 1,094 |
| DUP | Robin Stirling | 854 |
| UUP | Robin Cherry | 748 |
| SDLP | Margaret Gribben | 645 |
| UUP | Lexie Scott | 596 |
| Sinn Féin | Laurence O'Neill | 589 |
| UUP | Robert Wilson | 404 |
| Turnout | | 6,537 |
| DUP gain from UUP | | |

=== Ballymoney ===
Election results, shaded by plurality of First Preference Votes

Ballymoney Town
| Party | Candidate | 1st Pref |
|---|---|---|
| DUP | Robert Storey | 888 |
| DUP | Cecil Cousley | 824 |
| DUP | Ian Stevenson | 662 |
| SDLP | Justin McCamphill | 456 |
| UUP | Thomas McKeown | 411 |
| UUP | James Simpson | 260 |
| Turnout | | 3,578 |
No change

Bann Valley
| Party | Candidate | 1st Pref |
|---|---|---|
| Sinn Féin | Philip McGuigan | 1,062 |
| DUP | John Finlay | 795 |
| DUP | Roy Wilson | 740 |
| DUP | Audrey Patterson | 715 |
| Sinn Féin | Daithí McKay | 689 |
| UUP | Joe Gaston | 646 |
| SDLP | Malachy McCamphill | 392 |
| SDLP | Charley O'Kane | 158 |
| Turnout | | 5,297 |
| Sinn Féin gain from UUP | | |

Bushvale
| Party | Candidate | 1st Pref |
|---|---|---|
| Sinn Féin | Anita Cavlan | 711 |
| DUP | Frank Campbell | 573 |
| DUP | Evelyne Robinson | 532 |
| SDLP | Harry Connolly | 506 |
| Independent | Bill Kennedy | 473 |
| DUP | Robert Holmes | 298 |
| UUP | William Johnston | 274 |
| UUP | William Logan | 269 |
| Turnout | | 3,696 |
| Sinn Féin gain from UUP | | |
| DUP gain from UUP | | |
| Bill Kennedy leaves DUP | | |

=== Banbridge ===
Election results, shaded by plurality of First Preference Votes

Banbridge Town
| Party | Candidate | 1st Pref |
|---|---|---|
| UUP | Joan Baird | 1,501 |
| SDLP | Patrick McAleenan | 1,236 |
| DUP | Jim McElroy | 1,089 |
| DUP | Junior McCrum | 947 |
| Alliance | Frank McQuaid | 556 |
| UUP | Ian Burns | 549 |
| UUP | Derick Bell | 331 |
| Turnout | | 6,311 |
| DUP gain from UUP | | |

Dromore
| Party | Candidate | 1st Pref |
|---|---|---|
| UUP | Tyrone Howe | 1,304 |
| DUP | Norah Beare | 1,292 |
| DUP | Paul Rankin | 870 |
| DUP | David Herron | 838 |
| SDLP | Cassie McDermott | 712 |
| UUP | William Martin | 580 |
| Sinn Féin | Francis Branniff | 429 |
| Turnout | | 6,119 |
| Norah Beare leaves UUP | | |

Knockiveagh
| Party | Candidate | 1st Pref |
|---|---|---|
| SDLP | Seamus Doyle | 1,051 |
| DUP | Stephen Herron | 1,026 |
| UUP | John Ingram | 878 |
| Sinn Féin | Dessie Ward | 758 |
| DUP | Wilfred McFadden | 740 |
| UUP | John Hanna | 593 |
| Independent | Malachy McCartan | 498 |
| DUP | Ian Wilson | 449 |
| UUP | John McCallister | 386 |
| Alliance | David Griffin | 300 |
| Turnout | | 6,796 |
| Sinn Féin gain from Independent | | |

=== Belfast ===
Election results, shaded by plurality of First Preference Votes

Balmoral
| Party | Candidate | 1st Pref |
|---|---|---|
| SDLP | Carmel Hanna | 2,030 |
| Alliance | Tom Ekin | 1,508 |
| DUP | Jim Kirkpatrick | 1,473 |
| Sinn Féin | Stiofán Long | 1,202 |
| UUP | Bob Stoker | 1,180 |
| DUP | Ruth Patterson | 1,130 |
| UUP | Esmond Birnie | 1,125 |
| SDLP | Mary Kennedy | 943 |
| SDLP | Bernie Kelly | 906 |
| Independent | Thomas Wilson | 213 |
| Turnout | | 11,902 |
| DUP gain from UUP | | |

Castle
| Party | Candidate | 1st Pref |
|---|---|---|
| DUP | Nigel Dodds | 3,161 |
| SDLP | Pat Convery | 1,818 |
| UUP | David Browne | 1,148 |
| SDLP | Cathal Mullaghan | 1,136 |
| Sinn Féin | Tierna Cunningham | 1,029 |
| Sinn Féin | David Kennedy | 1,001 |
| DUP | Sarah Patterson | 618 |
| DUP | Ian Crozier | 438 |
| Alliance | Marjorie Hawkins | 270 |
| Green (NI) | Shane Ó Heorpa | 183 |
| Workers' Party | John Lavery | 112 |
| Turnout | | 11,167 |
No change

Court
| Party | Candidate | 1st Pref |
|---|---|---|
| DUP | Diane Dodds | 4,176 |
| PUP | Hugh Smyth | 799 |
| Independent | Frank McCoubrey | 794 |
| DUP | William Humphrey | 679 |
| UUP | Chris McGimpsey | 575 |
| Sinn Féin | Francis Hamilton | 249 |
| DUP | Elaine McMillen | 221 |
| Turnout | | 7,726 |
| DUP gain from UUP | | |

Laganbank
| Party | Candidate | 1st Pref |
|---|---|---|
| Sinn Féin | Alex Maskey | 1,600 |
| SDLP | Patrick McCarthy | 1,459 |
| SDLP | Peter O'Reilly | 1,376 |
| DUP | Christopher Stalford | 1,362 |
| UUP | Michael McGimpsey | 1,332 |
| Alliance | Alan Leonard | 859 |
| Green (NI) | Andrew Frew | 369 |
| UUP | Paula Bradshaw | 364 |
| Socialist Party | James Barbour | 175 |
| Workers' Party | Patrick Lynn | 107 |
| Turnout | | 9,208 |
| DUP gain from UUP | | |

Lower Falls
| Party | Candidate | 1st Pref |
|---|---|---|
| Sinn Féin | Janice Austin | 2,071 |
| Sinn Féin | Fra McCann | 2,045 |
| Sinn Féin | Tom Hartley | 1,962 |
| Sinn Féin | Máire Cush | 1,764 |
| SDLP | Margaret Walsh | 1,265 |
| Sinn Féin | Marie Moore | 1,245 |
| Workers' Party | John Lowry | 314 |
| Turnout | | 11,058 |
| Sinn Féin gain from SDLP | | |

Oldpark
| Party | Candidate | 1st Pref |
|---|---|---|
| DUP | Nelson McCausland | 2,642 |
| Sinn Féin | Daniel Lavery | 2,093 |
| Sinn Féin | Margaret McCleneghan | 1,829 |
| SDLP | Alban Maginness | 1,411 |
| Sinn Féin | Carál Ní Chuilín | 1,242 |
| UUP | Fred Cobain | 938 |
| SDLP | Andrew Harding | 476 |
| Sinn Féin | Mary Mackessy | 467 |
| PUP | Billy Hutchinson | 455 |
| Green (NI) | Peter Emerson | 249 |
| Workers' Party | Paul Treanor | 60 |
| Turnout | | 12,191 |
| UUP gain from PUP | | |

Pottinger
| Party | Candidate | 1st Pref |
|---|---|---|
| DUP | Sammy Wilson | 2,385 |
| UUP | Reg Empey | 1,968 |
| DUP | May Campbell | 1,302 |
| PUP | David Ervine | 1,156 |
| Sinn Féin | Deborah Devenny | 944 |
| Alliance | Máire Hendron | 795 |
| DUP | Margaret McKenzie | 717 |
| SDLP | Mary Muldoon | 670 |
| UUP | Sonia Copeland | 277 |
| Socialist Party | Thomas Black | 163 |
| Workers' Party | Joseph Bell | 105 |
| UUP | Henry Wallace | 72 |
| Turnout | | 10,935 |
| DUP gain from UUP | | |
| Alliance gain from Sinn Féin | | |

Upper Falls
| Party | Candidate | 1st Pref |
|---|---|---|
| Sinn Féin | Paul Maskey | 3,084 |
| SDLP | Tim Attwood | 2,815 |
| Sinn Féin | Gerard O'Neill | 2,448 |
| Sinn Féin | Michael Browne | 2,257 |
| Sinn Féin | Christine Mhic Giolla Mhín | 1,428 |
| Sinn Féin | Caoimhin Mac Giolla Mhín | 571 |
| SDLP | Roisin Mulholland | 413 |
| Turnout | | 13,453 |
| No change | | |

Victoria
| Party | Candidate | 1st Pref |
|---|---|---|
| DUP | Wallace Browne | 2,689 |
| Alliance | Naomi Long | 2,565 |
| UUP | Jim Rodgers | 2,441 |
| DUP | Robin Newton | 2,004 |
| UUP | Ian Adamson | 1,877 |
| Alliance | Mervyn Jones | 811 |
| DUP | David Rodway | 725 |
| UUP | Alan Crowe | 459 |
| SDLP | John Ó Doherty | 340 |
| PUP | John McQuillan | 303 |
| NI Conservatives | Peter Gray | 243 |
| Turnout | | 14,806 |
| DUP gain from UUP | | |

=== Carrickfergus ===
Election results, shaded by plurality of First Preference Votes

Carrick Castle
| Party | Candidate | 1st Pref |
|---|---|---|
| DUP | David Hilditch | 1,052 |
| Alliance | Sean Neeson | 792 |
| Independent | William Hamilton | 421 |
| UUP | Albert Ferguson | 275 |
| Independent | Philip Mannis | 203 |
| DUP | Patricia McKinney | 186 |
| Independent | Nicholas Wady | 80 |
| Turnout | | 3,092 |
No change

Kilroot
| Party | Candidate | 1st Pref |
|---|---|---|
| DUP | Billy Ashe | 1,775 |
| Independent | Charles Brown | 1,162 |
| Alliance | Isobel Day | 709 |
| Alliance | Robert Logan | 636 |
| UUP | Eric Ferguson | 622 |
| DUP | Terence Clements | 375 |
| DUP | Lynn McClurg | 252 |
| UUP | Carolyn Howarth | 186 |
| Turnout | | 5,838 |
| DUP gain from Alliance | | |

Knockagh Monument
| Party | Candidate | 1st Pref |
|---|---|---|
| DUP | May Beattie | 1,718 |
| UUP | Roy Beggs Jr | 1,007 |
| Alliance | Stewart Dickson | 785 |
| DUP | James McClurg | 443 |
| Alliance | Shireen Bell | 296 |
| Independent | Robert Rice | 293 |
| UUP | Mark Cosgrove | 253 |
| DUP | Louise Marsden | 214 |
| UUP | Jackie Glover | 165 |
| Turnout | | 5,285 |
| DUP gain from Alliance | | |

=== Castlereagh ===
Election results, shaded by plurality of First Preference Votes

Castlereagh Central
| Party | Candidate | 1st Pref |
|---|---|---|
| DUP | Peter Robinson | 1,431 |
| Alliance | Michael Long | 905 |
| DUP | Joanne Bunting | 895 |
| UUP | Michael Copeland | 541 |
| DUP | John Norris | 421 |
| SDLP | Sean Mullan | 363 |
| PUP | Tommy Sandford* | 356 |
| DUP | Andrew Ramsey | 272 |
| Independent | Alan Carson | 209 |
| UUP | Alan Martin | 152 |
| Turnout | | 5,700 |
| DUP gain from PUP | | |

Castlereagh East
| Party | Candidate | 1st Pref |
|---|---|---|
| DUP | Iris Robinson | 2,090 |
| Alliance | Judith Cochrane | 957 |
| DUP | Tommy Jeffers | 857 |
| DUP | Gareth Robinson | 778 |
| UUP | David Drysdale | 618 |
| UUP | Mervyn Bailie | 580 |
| Independent | Francis Gallagher | 551 |
| DUP | Charlie Tosh | 426 |
| DUP | Jim White | 417 |
| UUP | Hazel Legge | 263 |
| PUP | Colin Neill | 181 |
| Turnout | | 7,897 |
| DUP gain from Independent | | |

Castlereagh South
| Party | Candidate | 1st Pref |
|---|---|---|
| DUP | Jimmy Spratt | 1,317 |
| DUP | Jack Beattie | 1,219 |
| Alliance | Geraldine Rice | 1,180 |
| SDLP | Brian Hanvey | 1,112 |
| UUP | Michael Henderson | 977 |
| SDLP | Leo Van Es | 421 |
| Sinn Féin | Dermot Kennedy | 395 |
| UUP | Barbara McBurney | 288 |
| Turnout | | 7,008 |
| DUP gain from UUP | | |

Castlereagh West
| Party | Candidate | 1st Pref |
|---|---|---|
| DUP | Ann-Marie Beattie | 1,417 |
| Alliance | Sara Duncan | 1,177 |
| UUP | Cecil Hall | 835 |
| SDLP | Rosaleen Hughes | 794 |
| DUP | Myreve Chambers | 596 |
| SDLP | Gary Vaugh | 441 |
| UUP | Bill White | 379 |
| Independent | Cyril Kernaghan | 266 |
| Turnout | | 6,050 |
No change

=== Coleraine ===
Election results, shaded by plurality of First Preference Votes

Bann
| Party | Candidate | 1st Pref |
|---|---|---|
| DUP | Adrian McQuillan | 986 |
| UUP | Olive Church | 918 |
| SDLP | John Dallat | 901 |
| Sinn Féin | Billy Leonard | 895 |
| UUP | William King | 893 |
| DUP | Albert Cole | 817 |
| DUP | Jonathan Fielding | 573 |
| UUP | Jim Watt | 542 |
| SDLP | Eamon Mullan | 470 |
| Turnout | | 7,116 |
| DUP gain from UUP | | |
| Sinn Féin gain from SDLP | | |

Coleraine Central
| Party | Candidate | 1st Pref |
|---|---|---|
| UUP | David McClarty | 1,478 |
| DUP | James McClure | 1,064 |
| DUP | Timothy Deans | 916 |
| SDLP | Gerald McLaughlin | 694 |
| UUP | Elizabeth Johnston | 471 |
| UUP | David Barbour | 449 |
| Alliance | Eamon O'Hara | 386 |
| Independent | Russell Watton | 380 |
| Sinn Féin | Kevin Darragh | 366 |
| DUP | Adrian Parke | 366 |
| Turnout | | 6,478 |
No change

Coleraine East
| Party | Candidate | 1st Pref |
|---|---|---|
| DUP | Maurice Bradley | 1,395 |
| DUP | William Creelman | 629 |
| UUP | Elizabeth Black | 417 |
| UUP | Robert McPherson | 416 |
| UUP | David Harding | 330 |
| DUP | Ellen Fielding | 267 |
| SDLP | John Montgomery | 227 |
| Alliance | Yvonne Boyle | 185 |
| Sinn Féin | Maria O'Neill | 121 |
| Turnout | | 4,862 |
No change

The Skerries
| Party | Candidate | 1st Pref |
|---|---|---|
| Independent | Christine Alexander | 846 |
| DUP | Robert Stewart | 773 |
| UUP | Norman Hillis | 697 |
| DUP | Sandy Gilkinson | 549 |
| Alliance | Barney Fitzpatrick | 455 |
| UUP | Samuel Barr | 450 |
| SDLP | Maura Hickey | 418 |
| Sinn Féin | Valerie Leonard | 352 |
| Independent | Barbara Dempsey | 162 |
| Turnout | | 4,767 |
| DUP gain from UUP | | |

=== Cookstown ===
Election results, shaded by plurality of First Preference Votes

Ballinderry (Note: Because only six candidates had been nominated for the six seats, there was no vote and all six candidates were declared elected.)
| Party | Candidate | 1st Pref |
|---|---|---|
| Sinn Féin | Patrick McAleer | N/A |
| Sinn Féin | Michael McIvor | N/A |
| SDLP | Mary Baker | N/A |
| SDLP | Patsy McGlone | N/A |
| DUP | Samuel McCartney | N/A |
| UUP | Thomas Greer | N/A |
| Turnout | | N/A |
No change

Cookstown Central
| Party | Candidate | 1st Pref |
|---|---|---|
| DUP | Ian McCrea | 1,246 |
| UUP | Trevor Wilson | 1,110 |
| Sinn Féin | John McNamee | 977 |
| SDLP | Peter Cassidy | 514 |
| SDLP | Tony Quinn | 493 |
| Sinn Féin | Ciarán McElhone | 358 |
| Socialist Party | Harry Hutchinson | 84 |
| Turnout | | 4,854 |
| SDLP gain from Sinn Féin | | |

Drum Manor
| Party | Candidate | 1st Pref |
|---|---|---|
| Sinn Féin | Sean Clarke | 1,055 |
| DUP | Alice Lees | 997 |
| Sinn Féin | Oliver Molloy | 952 |
| UUP | Samuel Glasgow | 841 |
| SDLP | James McGarvey | 723 |
| Independent | Samuel Parke | 641 |
| Turnout | | 5,268 |
| DUP gain from Independent | | |

=== Craigavon ===
Election results, shaded by plurality of First Preference Votes

Craigavon Central
| Party | Candidate | 1st Pref |
|---|---|---|
| DUP | Robert Smith | 1,587 |
| UUP | Kenneth Twyble | 1,308 |
| Sinn Féin | John O'Dowd | 1,229 |
| DUP | William Smith | 928 |
| SDLP | Kieran Corr | 788 |
| Sinn Féin | Francis Murray | 693 |
| DUP | Philip Weir | 622 |
| Alliance | Alan Castle | 598 |
| UUP | Ronald Harkness | 525 |
| SDLP | Patricia Mallon | 450 |
| UUP | Fred Crowe | 421 |
| UUP | Robert Oliver | 254 |
| Turnout | | 9,633 |
| DUP gain from SDLP | | |

Lurgan
| Party | Candidate | 1st Pref |
|---|---|---|
| UUP | Sam Gardiner | 2,109 |
| DUP | Stephen Moutray | 2,059 |
| DUP | Fergie Dawson | 1,101 |
| UUP | George Savage | 803 |
| Sinn Féin | Maurice Magill | 734 |
| SDLP | Francis McAlinden | 633 |
| Independent | David Calvert | 626 |
| UUP | Sydney Cairns | 582 |
| UUP | Meta Crozier | 434 |
| DUP | Anne Harrison | 373 |
| DUP | Mark Russell | 314 |
| Turnout | | 9,939 |
| DUP gain from UUP | | |
| Sinn Féin gain from SDLP | | |

Loughside
| Party | Candidate | 1st Pref |
|---|---|---|
| Sinn Féin | Mairead O'Dowd | 2,183 |
| SDLP | Dolores Kelly | 1,625 |
| Sinn Féin | Michael Tallon | 948 |
| SDLP | Bernard Elliott | 680 |
| Sinn Féin | Leah Small | 649 |
| SDLP | Mary McAlinden | 636 |
| UUP | Joy Savage | 306 |
| DUP | Ivan Russell | 302 |
| Workers' Party | Tom French | 155 |
| Turnout | | 7,712 |
| Sinn Féin gain from SDLP | | |

Portadown
| Party | Candidate | 1st Pref |
|---|---|---|
| DUP | David Simpson | 2,325 |
| DUP | Sidney Anderson | 809 |
| Sinn Féin | Brian McKeown | 781 |
| UUP | George Hatch | 736 |
| SDLP | Thomas Fox | 703 |
| Sinn Féin | Ciaran Tennyson | 515 |
| Independent | David Jones | 419 |
| SDLP | Elaine Sterritt | 334 |
| Independent | Mervyn Carrick | 310 |
| Alliance | John Hagan | 216 |
| UUP | Mark Neale | 213 |
| DUP | Alan Carson | 211 |
| UUP | David Thompson | 191 |
| Independent | Jim Dickson | 104 |
| Turnout | | 8,048 |
| DUP gain from UUP | | |

=== Derry ===
Election results, shaded by plurality of First Preference Votes

Cityside
| Party | Candidate | 1st Pref |
|---|---|---|
| Sinn Féin | Peter Anderson | 997 |
| SDLP | Pat Ramsey | 980 |
| Sinn Féin | Patricia Logue | 801 |
| Sinn Féin | Barney O'Hagan | 763 |
| SDLP | Jim Clifford | 722 |
| Sinn Féin | Kevin Campbell | 696 |
| Independent | Gary Donnelly | 493 |
| SDLP | Liam Boyle | 488 |
| Socialist Environmental | Liam Friel | 182 |
| Turnout | | 6,344 |
No change

Northland
| Party | Candidate | 1st Pref |
|---|---|---|
| SDLP | Mark H. Durkan | 2,369 |
| Sinn Féin | Gerry MacLochlainn | 1,124 |
| SDLP | Helen Quigley | 1,079 |
| Sinn Féin | Billy Page | 1,001 |
| Sinn Féin | Maeve McLaughlin | 849 |
| SDLP | Seana Hume | 788 |
| SDLP | John Kerr | 653 |
| SDLP | Sean Carr | 637 |
| Sinn Féin | Joanne McDaid | 630 |
| Sinn Féin | Sharon Duddy | 486 |
| Socialist Environmental | Colm Bryce | 353 |
| Socialist Environmental | Oisín Kehoe | 221 |
| Turnout | | 10,470 |
No change

Rural
| Party | Candidate | 1st Pref |
|---|---|---|
| DUP | William Hay | 1,413 |
| SDLP | Thomas Conway | 1,368 |
| DUP | Maurice Devenney | 1,275 |
| Sinn Féin | Paul Fleming | 1,137 |
| SDLP | Liam Boyle | 1,015 |
| SDLP | James McKeever | 675 |
| Sinn Féin | Thomas McGlinchey | 623 |
| UUP | Ernest Hamilton | 533 |
| UUP | Earl Storey | 450 |
| SDLP | Thomas Harty | 381 |
| Socialist Environmental | Eamonn McCann | 371 |
| Independent | Annie Courtney | 369 |
| Turnout | | 9,817 |
| DUP gain from UUP | | |

Shantallow
| Party | Candidate | 1st Pref |
|---|---|---|
| SDLP | Mary Bradley | 2,180 |
| SDLP | Colum Eastwood | 1,311 |
| Sinn Féin | Elisha McLaughlin | 1,264 |
| Sinn Féin | Gearóid Ó hEára | 1,119 |
| SDLP | Shaun Gallagher | 1,119 |
| Sinn Féin | Tony Hassan | 925 |
| Sinn Féin | Oliver Green | 798 |
| SDLP | Helena Kearney | 627 |
| Independent | Tommy Mullan | 340 |
| Turnout | | 9,910 |
No change

Waterside
| Party | Candidate | 1st Pref |
|---|---|---|
| DUP | Gregory Campbell | 1,521 |
| SDLP | Gerard Diver | 1,508 |
| DUP | Joe Miller | 1,187 |
| Sinn Féin | Lynn Fleming | 1,084 |
| UUP | Mary Hamilton | 1,017 |
| DUP | Drew Thompson | 986 |
| DUP | Mildred Garfield | 883 |
| SDLP | Martin Reilly | 567 |
| Sinn Féin | Jim Logue | 447 |
| Socialist Environmental | David McAuley | 194 |
| Turnout | | 9,602 |
No change

=== Down ===
Election results, shaded by plurality of First Preference Votes

Ballynahinch
| Party | Candidate | 1st Pref |
|---|---|---|
| DUP | Jim Wells | 1,305 |
| Sinn Féin | Michael Coogan | 1,248 |
| SDLP | Patrick Toman | 877 |
| UUP | Peter Bowles | 807 |
| SDLP | Anne McAleenan | 746 |
| SDLP | Francis Casement | 462 |
| UUP | Walter Lyons | 438 |
| DUP | Samuel Hanna | 375 |
| Turnout | | 6,364 |
No change

Downpatrick
| Party | Candidate | 1st Pref |
|---|---|---|
| Sinn Féin | Eamonn McConvey | 1,259 |
| SDLP | Peter Craig | 1,060 |
| SDLP | Dermot Curran | 939 |
| SDLP | John Doris | 865 |
| Sinn Féin | Liam Johnston | 722 |
| UUP | William Murphy | 650 |
| SDLP | Colin McGrath | 624 |
| Green (NI) | Bill Corry | 565 |
| Sinn Féin | Caitríona Mackel | 483 |
| SDLP | Daniel McEvoy | 400 |
| Workers' Party | Desmond O'Hagan | 97 |
| Turnout | | 7,833 |
| Sinn Féin gain from UUP | | |
| Green gain from Independent | | |

Newcastle
| Party | Candidate | 1st Pref |
|---|---|---|
| SDLP | Eamon O'Neill | 1,379 |
| Sinn Féin | William Clarke | 1,301 |
| SDLP | Carmel O'Boyle | 936 |
| UUP | Gerald Douglas | 808 |
| DUP | Stanley Priestley | 744 |
| SDLP | Peter Fitzpatrick | 573 |
| Sinn Féin | Aíne McEvoy | 541 |
| Sinn Féin | Hugh McDowell | 469 |
| Alliance | Charles McGrath | 252 |
| Green (NI) | Peter McCarron | 148 |
| Turnout | | 7,323 |
No change

Rowallane
| Party | Candidate | 1st Pref |
|---|---|---|
| DUP | William Dick | 1,326 |
| SDLP | Margaret Ritchie | 1,105 |
| UUP | Robert Burgess | 928 |
| DUP | William Walker | 721 |
| UUP | Edward Rea | 580 |
| UUP | Albert Colmer | 537 |
| Alliance | Lorna Dunn | 333 |
| Sinn Féin | Mary Robb | 313 |
| SDLP | Patricia McKay | 310 |
| Green (NI) | Philip Orr | 187 |
| Turnout | | 6,429 |
| DUP gain from UUP | | |

=== Dungannon and South Tyrone ===
Election results, shaded by plurality of First Preference Votes

Blackwater
| Party | Candidate | 1st Pref |
|---|---|---|
| DUP | Roger Burton | 1,309 |
| Sinn Féin | Phelim Gildernew | 1,095 |
| DUP | Samuel Brush | 995 |
| UUP | Jim Hamilton | 864 |
| SDLP | Patrick Daly | 765 |
| UUP | Sammy Stewart | 470 |
| Sinn Féin | Josefa Watters | 411 |
| DUP | Denver Thompson | 260 |
| Turnout | | 6,266 |
| DUP gain from UUP | | |

Clogher Valley
| Party | Candidate | 1st Pref |
|---|---|---|
| SDLP | Anthony McGonnell | 1,134 |
| DUP | William McIlwrath | 837 |
| DUP | Frances Burton | 836 |
| Sinn Féin | Sean McGuigan | 806 |
| UUP | Robert Mulligan | 773 |
| Sinn Féin | Colla McMahon | 756 |
| UUP | Ken Maginnis | 479 |
| Sinn Féin | Bronwyn McGahan | 368 |
| Turnout | | 6,063 |
No change

Dungannon Town
| Party | Candidate | 1st Pref |
|---|---|---|
| DUP | Maurice Morrow | 1,029 |
| SDLP | Vincent Currie | 871 |
| UUP | Walter Cuddy | 835 |
| Sinn Féin | John McLarnon | 817 |
| Sinn Féin | Barry Monteith | 713 |
| DUP | Gilbert Greenaway | 497 |
| Sinn Féin | Tony Slevin | 377 |
| UUP | Victor McNickle | 283 |
| Turnout | | 5,502 |
| DUP gain from UUP | | |

Torrent
| Party | Candidate | 1st Pref |
|---|---|---|
| Sinn Féin | Michael Gillespie | 1,392 |
| Sinn Féin | O'Neill Michelle | 1,270 |
| Sinn Féin | Francie Molloy | 1,173 |
| SDLP | Jim Cavanagh | 956 |
| Independent | Jim Canning | 923 |
| Sinn Féin | Desmond Donnelly | 815 |
| UUP | Norman Badger | 732 |
| DUP | Robert McFarland | 369 |
| Turnout | | 7,720 |
| Sinn Féin gain from Independent | | |

=== Fermanagh ===
Election results, shaded by plurality of First Preference Votes

Enniskillen
| Party | Candidate | 1st Pref |
|---|---|---|
| DUP | Arlene Foster | 2,054 |
| Sinn Féin | Pat Cox | 964 |
| SDLP | Frank Britton | 916 |
| Sinn Féin | Gerry McHugh | 838 |
| Sinn Féin | Paddy Gilgunn | 684 |
| UUP | Raymond Ferguson | 682 |
| SDLP | Patricia Rodgers | 668 |
| UUP | Robert Irvine | 576 |
| UUP | Basil Johnston | 527 |
| Socialist Party | Samuel Dunne | 406 |
| DUP | Joe Dodds | 400 |
| Turnout | | 8,878 |
| DUP gain from UUP | | |
| SDLP gain from Independent | | |

Erne East
| Party | Candidate | 1st Pref |
|---|---|---|
| DUP | Paul Robinson | 1,277 |
| Sinn Féin | Ruth Lynch | 1,197 |
| Sinn Féin | Thomas O'Reilly | 1,179 |
| SDLP | Fergus McQuillan | 1,157 |
| Sinn Féin | Brian McCaffrey | 1,132 |
| Sinn Féin | Sean Lynch | 1,110 |
| UUP | Harold Andrews | 1,022 |
| UUP | Jean McVitty | 719 |
| Turnout | | 8,933 |
| DUP gain from UUP | | |

Erne North
| Party | Candidate | 1st Pref |
|---|---|---|
| UUP | Thomas Elliott | 1,686 |
| Sinn Féin | Breege McSorley | 1,166 |
| DUP | Bert Johnston | 1,036 |
| SDLP | John O'Kane | 749 |
| DUP | Mandy Mahon | 720 |
| SDLP | Julie Dervan | 517 |
| UUP | Gary Wilson | 210 |
| UUP | Bertie Kerr | 204 |
| Turnout | | 6,399 |
No change

Erne West
| Party | Candidate | 1st Pref |
|---|---|---|
| SDLP | Gerard Gallagher | 1,559 |
| Sinn Féin | Poilin Ui Cathain | 1,134 |
| Sinn Féin | Stephen Huggett | 1,121 |
| Sinn Féin | Bernice Swift | 1,086 |
| DUP | Cyril Brownlee | 912 |
| UUP | Alex Baird | 689 |
| UUP | Derrick Nixon | 515 |
| Independent | Kevin Nolan | 115 |
| Green (NI) | Laurence Speight | 79 |
| Turnout | | 7,345 |
No change

=== Larne ===
Election results, shaded by plurality of First Preference Votes

Coast Road
| Party | Candidate | 1st Pref |
|---|---|---|
| DUP | Winston Fulton | 770 |
| SDLP | Daniel O'Connor | 564 |
| DUP | Rachel Rea | 507 |
| UUP | Brian Dunn | 501 |
| Sinn Féin | James McKeown | 441 |
| Alliance | Gerardine Mulvenna | 411 |
| UUP | Joan Drummond | 259 |
| Independent | William Cunning | 212 |
| Turnout | | 3,665 |
No change

Larne Lough
| Party | Candidate | 1st Pref |
|---|---|---|
| DUP | Bobby McKee | 1,589 |
| UUP | Roy Beggs | 931 |
| Alliance | John Mathews | 862 |
| UUP | Andrew Wilson | 585 |
| UUP | Jonathan Moore | 418 |
| DUP | Gregg McKeen | 182 |
| Turnout | | 4,567 |
No change

Larne Town
| Party | Candidate | 1st Pref |
|---|---|---|
| DUP | Jack McKee | 939 |
| SDLP | Gerard Wilson | 511 |
| Independent | Roy Craig | 435 |
| UUP | Martin Dunn | 307 |
| Independent | John Anderson | 246 |
| Independent | Lindsay Mason | 244 |
| Alliance | Elena Aceves-Cully | 175 |
| PUP | Billy Adamson | 131 |
| Independent | Robert Shaw | 122 |
| DUP | Sharon McKeen | 114 |
| UUP | Maxi Burns | 101 |
| Independent | Thomas Robinson | 57 |
| Independent | David Todd | 47 |
| Green (NI) | Mary Ringland | 46 |
| Turnout | | 3,475 |
No change

=== Limavady ===
Election results, shaded by plurality of First Preference Votes

Bellarena
| Party | Candidate | 1st Pref |
|---|---|---|
| DUP | Joseph Cubitt | 1,189 |
| UUP | Edwin Stevenson | 759 |
| Sinn Féin | Gerard Butcher | 667 |
| SDLP | Michael Carten | 630 |
| Sinn Féin | John McElhinney | 603 |
| SDLP | John McKinney | 501 |
| SDLP | Deborah Crewe | 359 |
| DUP | Arnold Shannon | 320 |
| Turnout | | 5,105 |
| Sinn Féin gain from SDLP | | |

Benbradagh
| Party | Candidate | 1st Pref |
|---|---|---|
| UUC | Boyd Douglas | 922 |
| Sinn Féin | Cathal Hassan | 666 |
| SDLP | Michael Coyle | 635 |
| Sinn Féin | Brenda Chivers | 611 |
| Sinn Féin | Marion Donaghy | 484 |
| Sinn Féin | Martin McGuigan | 442 |
| UUC | Samuel Oliver | 406 |
| SDLP | Evelyn Donaghy | 256 |
| Turnout | | 4,519 |
No change

Limavady Town
| Party | Candidate | 1st Pref |
|---|---|---|
| DUP | George Robinson | 876 |
| DUP | Alan Robinson | 768 |
| Sinn Féin | Anne Brolly | 657 |
| UUP | John Rankin | 472 |
| SDLP | Gerry Mullan | 414 |
| UUP | John Dolan | 281 |
| SDLP | Gareth Peoples | 259 |
| Turnout | | 3,785 |
| Sinn Féin gain from Independent | | |
| DUP gain from UUP | | |

=== Lisburn ===
Election results, shaded by plurality of First Preference Votes

Downshire
| Party | Candidate | 1st Pref |
|---|---|---|
| DUP | Edwin Poots | 1,929 |
| UUP | Basil McCrea | 1,601 |
| DUP | Allan Ewart | 1,502 |
| Alliance | Elizabeth Campbell | 1,087 |
| UUP | William Ward | 636 |
| DUP | Joseph Lockhart | 577 |
| UUP | James Baird | 559 |
| UUP | William Scott | 237 |
| Sinn Féin | David Hall | 104 |
| Turnout | | 8,346 |
| DUP gain from UUP | | |

Dunmurry Cross
| Party | Candidate | 1st Pref |
|---|---|---|
| Sinn Féin | Paul Butler | 1,823 |
| Sinn Féin | Michael Ferguson | 1,464 |
| DUP | Stephen Moore | 1,393 |
| SDLP | Patricia Lewsley | 1,369 |
| Sinn Féin | Máireád Uí Adhmaill | 1,464 |
| Sinn Féin | Angela Nelson | 1,010 |
| Sinn Féin | Veronica Willis | 940 |
| SDLP | Brian Heading | 834 |
| UUP | Kenneth Bishop | 691 |
| Turnout | | 10,958 |
| DUP gain from UUP | | |

Killultagh
| Party | Candidate | 1st Pref |
|---|---|---|
| DUP | Robert Beckett | 1,751 |
| DUP | James Tinsley | 1,279 |
| DUP | Cecil Calvert | 1,049 |
| UUP | Jim Dillon | 1,046 |
| SDLP | Peter O'Hagan | 977 |
| Sinn Féin | Chris Donnelly | 652 |
| Alliance | Owen Gawith | 578 |
| UUP | Samuel Johnston | 460 |
| NI Conservatives | Neil Johnston | 333 |
| UUP | David Green | 306 |
| Turnout | | 8,553 |
| DUP gain from UUP | | |

Lisburn Town North
| Party | Candidate | 1st Pref |
|---|---|---|
| DUP | Jonathan Craig | 1,794 |
| DUP | Paul Givan | 1,506 |
| Alliance | Trevor Lunn | 1,080 |
| DUP | William Leathem | 1,064 |
| UUP | Ronnie Crawford | 759 |
| UUP | William Gardiner-Watson | 678 |
| UUP | Kenneth Armstrong | 647 |
| UUP | David Archer | 644 |
| SDLP | John Drake | 568 |
| UUP | Ellen Hillen | 379 |
| Green (NI) | Michael Rogan | 284 |
| Sinn Féin | Jacqui Currie | 222 |
| Alliance | Frazer McCammond | 160 |
| Turnout | | 9,984 |
| Ronnie Crawford joins UUP | | |
| DUP gain from UUP | | |

Lisburn Town South
| Party | Candidate | 1st Pref |
|---|---|---|
| DUP | Jeffrey Donaldson | 2,109 |
| Alliance | Seamus Close | 1,002 |
| UUP | Ivan Davis | 587 |
| DUP | Paul Porter | 550 |
| DUP | Jennifer Palmer | 420 |
| DUP | Andrew Ewing | 315 |
| UUP | Thomas Archer | 229 |
| UUP | Denis Troughton | 166 |
| Sinn Féin | Martin Parker | 152 |
| SDLP | Yvonne Byrne | 146 |
| Turnout | | 5,820 |
| DUP gain from UUP and Independent | | |

=== Magherafelt ===
Election results, shaded by plurality of First Preference Votes

Magherafelt Town
| Party | Candidate | 1st Pref |
|---|---|---|
| DUP | William McCrea | 2,286 |
| Sinn Féin | Peter Bateson | 1,270 |
| SDLP | Jim Campbell | 937 |
| Sinn Féin | Sean McPeake | 846 |
| UUP | George Shiels | 691 |
| SDLP | Brendan Scott | 524 |
| Sinn Féin | Seamus O'Brien | 409 |
| DUP | Paul McLean | 250 |
| Turnout | | 7,213 |
No change

Moyola
| Party | Candidate | 1st Pref |
|---|---|---|
| DUP | Thomas Catherwood | 1,557 |
| Sinn Féin | James O'Neill | 1,202 |
| Sinn Féin | Oliver Hughes | 1,139 |
| Sinn Féin | Ian Milne | 831 |
| SDLP | Elizabeth Foster | 760 |
| UUP | John Crawford | 617 |
| Independent | John Junkin | 426 |
| Turnout | | 6,532 |
| Sinn Féin gain from SDLP | | |

Sperrin
| Party | Candidate | 1st Pref |
|---|---|---|
| Sinn Féin | Patrick Groogan | 1,396 |
| Sinn Féin | Kathleen McEldowney | 1,135 |
| Sinn Féin | John Kerr | 1,117 |
| SDLP | Kathleen Lagan | 999 |
| DUP | Elizabeth Forde | 790 |
| SDLP | Hugh Kelly | 675 |
| Independent | Robert Montgomery | 609 |
| Sinn Féin | Hugh Mullan | 491 |
| Workers' Party | Francis Donnelly | 102 |
| Turnout | | 7,314 |
| DUP gain from Independent | | |

=== Moyle ===
Election results, shaded by plurality of First Preference Votes

Ballycastle
| Party | Candidate | 1st Pref |
|---|---|---|
| Sinn Féin | Cara McShane | 545 |
| SDLP | Madeline Black | 371 |
| UUP | Helen Harding | 323 |
| Independent | Seamus Blaney | 302 |
| Sinn Féin | Cathal Newcombe | 293 |
| SDLP | Michael Molloy | 265 |
| DUP | Ian Chestnutt | 171 |
| DUP | Christine McFaul | 125 |
| Turnout | | 2,439 |
| Sinn Féin gain from DUP and SDLP | | |

Giant's Causeway
| Party | Candidate | 1st Pref |
|---|---|---|
| DUP | David McAllister | 481 |
| DUP | George Hartin | 470 |
| UUP | William Graham | 326 |
| Independent | Price McConaghy | 222 |
| UUP | Robert McIlroy | 172 |
| Independent | Thomas Palmer | 22 |
| Turnout | | 1,743 |
No change

The Glens
| Party | Candidate | 1st Pref |
|---|---|---|
| Sinn Féin | Oliver McMullan | 682 |
| SDLP | Orla Black | 437 |
| Independent | Randal McDonnell | 403 |
| SDLP | Catherine McCambridge | 321 |
| Sinn Féin | Marie McKeegan | 315 |
| Sinn Féin | Maria O'Hara | 221 |
| DUP | Walter Greer | 201 |
| Turnout | | 2,623 |
| Oliver McMullan joins Sinn Féin | | |

=== Newry and Mourne ===
Election results, shaded by plurality of First Preference Votes

Crotlieve
| Party | Candidate | 1st Pref |
|---|---|---|
| SDLP | Karen McKevitt | 1,150 |
| Sinn Féin | Michael Ruane | 1,071 |
| SDLP | Michael Carr | 1,041 |
| SDLP | Josephine O'Hare | 966 |
| Sinn Féin | Peter Kearney | 921 |
| Green (NI) | Ciaran Mussen | 863 |
| Sinn Féin | Mick Murphy | 852 |
| Independent | Thomas McCann | 745 |
| Independent | Anthony Williamson | 707 |
| SDLP | Brendan Murney | 529 |
| UUP | Kenneth Donaldson | 510 |
| SDLP | Paul McKibben | 498 |
| Sinn Féin | Geraldine McAteer | 477 |
| DUP | Wilma McCulllough | 300 |
| Turnout | | 10,828 |
| Green gain from SDLP | | |

Newry Town
| Party | Candidate | 1st Pref |
|---|---|---|
| Independent | Jackie Patterson | 1,186 |
| Sinn Féin | Charlie Casey | 1,128 |
| SDLP | John McCardle | 899 |
| Sinn Féin | Marian Mathers | 831 |
| Sinn Féin | Brendan Curran | 723 |
| Sinn Féin | Ewan Morgan | 712 |
| SDLP | Frank Feely | 655 |
| Sinn Féin | Catherine McMahon | 581 |
| SDLP | Gary Stokes | 558 |
| UUP | David Taylor | 550 |
| SDLP | Terry Ruddy | 494 |
| Independent | Gerry Markey | 190 |
| Independent | Vincent Markey | 47 |
| Turnout | | 8,756 |
No change

Slieve Gullion
| Party | Candidate | 1st Pref |
|---|---|---|
| Sinn Féin | Colman Burns | 1,399 |
| Sinn Féin | Terry Hearty | 1,295 |
| Sinn Féin | Anthony Flynn | 1,243 |
| Sinn Féin | Mary Campbell | 1,223 |
| SDLP | Geraldine Donnelly | 1,151 |
| Sinn Féin | Packie McDonald | 1,105 |
| SDLP | Peter McEvoy | 822 |
| Turnout | | 8,405 |
No change

The Fews
| Party | Candidate | 1st Pref |
|---|---|---|
| Sinn Féin | Pat McGinn | 1,246 |
| Sinn Féin | Jimmy McCreesh | 1,190 |
| UUP | Danny Kennedy | 1,169 |
| Sinn Féin | Aodh Lewis | 1,135 |
| SDLP | John Feehan | 957 |
| SDLP | Susan Mackin | 718 |
| DUP | Glenn Oliver | 681 |
| UUP | Andy Moffett | 596 |
| SDLP | Noelle McGarvey | 534 |
| Turnout | | 8,394 |
| DUP gain from UUP | | |

The Mournes
| Party | Candidate | 1st Pref |
|---|---|---|
| DUP | William Burns | 1,793 |
| UUP | Henry Reilly | 1,238 |
| SDLP | Michael Cole | 950 |
| Sinn Féin | Martin Connolly | 867 |
| SDLP | Marian Fitzpatrick | 693 |
| Independent | Martin Cunningham | 559 |
| UUP | Isaac Hanna | 549 |
| Independent | Arthur Coulter | 362 |
| DUP | Linda Burns | 75 |
| Turnout | | 7,225 |
No change

=== Newtownabbey ===
Election results, shaded by plurality of First Preference Votes

Antrim Line
| Party | Candidate | 1st Pref |
|---|---|---|
| DUP | Nigel Hamilton | 1,901 |
| SDLP | Noreen McClelland | 1,106 |
| UUP | Janet Crilly | 1,101 |
| Alliance | Tom Campbell | 859 |
| DUP | Paula Bradley | 810 |
| Sinn Féin | Briege Meehan | 780 |
| Sinn Féin | Martin Meehan | 670 |
| UUP | Ivan Hunter | 516 |
| SDLP | Tommy McTeague | 515 |
| DUP | Mandy Girvan | 425 |
| Newtownabbey Ratepayers' Association | Jennifer Irvine | 298 |
| Independent | Arthur Templeton | 64 |
| Turnout | | 9,235 |
| DUP gain from UUP | | |
| Alliance gain from SDLP | | |

Ballyclare
| Party | Candidate | 1st Pref |
|---|---|---|
| DUP | Paul Girvan | 3,402 |
| UUP | Jim Bingham | 925 |
| UUP | Vera McWilliams | 735 |
| UUP | Ted Turkington | 603 |
| Alliance | Patrick Sweeney | 451 |
| NI Conservatives | Alan Greer | 235 |
| DUP | Pamela Hunter | 180 |
| DUP | Etta Mann | 174 |
| Turnout | | 6,860 |
| DUP gain from UUP | | |

Macedon
| Party | Candidate | 1st Pref |
|---|---|---|
| DUP | William DeCourcy | 1,670 |
| Newtownabbey Ratepayers' Association | Billy Webb | 821 |
| DUP | Victor Robinson | 748 |
| Independent | Tommy Kirkham | 582 |
| UUP | John Scott | 551 |
| Sinn Féin | Sean Oliver | 321 |
| DUP | Dineen Walker | 292 |
| PUP | Catherine Robinson | 291 |
| SDLP | Michael McBrien | 200 |
| Turnout | | 5,629 |
| DUP gain from Independent | | |

University
| Party | Candidate | 1st Pref |
|---|---|---|
| DUP | William Ball | 2,025 |
| UUP | Ken Robinson | 1,431 |
| Alliance | Lynn Frazer | 1,074 |
| DUP | John Mann | 865 |
| Newtownabbey Ratepayers' Association | John Blair | 778 |
| UUP | Barbara Gilliland | 751 |
| UUC | Fraser Agnew | 736 |
| DUP | Robert Hill | 631 |
| UUP | Vi Scott | 468 |
| Turnout | | 8,845 |
| DUP gain from UUP | | |

=== North Down ===
Election results, shaded by plurality of First Preference Votes

Abbey
| Party | Candidate | 1st Pref |
|---|---|---|
| DUP | Ruby Cooling | 1,044 |
| DUP | Wesley Irvine | 842 |
| UUP | Harry Dunlop | 756 |
| Alliance | Stephen Farry | 713 |
| DUP | William Montgomery | 622 |
| Green (NI) | Kelly Andrews | 378 |
| UUP | Roberta Dunlop | 347 |
| PUP | Mark Gordon | 334 |
| Independent | Irene Cree | 308 |
| UK Unionist | Valerie Kinghan | 292 |
| NI Conservatives | Dean Russell | 174 |
| Independent | Christopher Carter | 141 |
| Turnout | | 6,154 |
| DUP gain from UKUP | | |

Ballyholme and Groomsport
| Party | Candidate | 1st Pref |
|---|---|---|
| DUP | Peter Weir | 1,571 |
| Independent | Alan Chambers | 1,557 |
| DUP | Alex Easton | 1,460 |
| Alliance | Marsden Fitzsimons | 1,039 |
| NI Women's Coalition | Patricia Wallace | 738 |
| UUP | Ian Henry | 724 |
| UUP | Leslie Cree | 701 |
| UUP | Mark Brooks | 669 |
| Independent | Austen Lennon | 620 |
| Independent | Henry Gordon | 176 |
| UK Unionist | Joseph Teggart | 68 |
| Turnout | | 9,479 |
| DUP gain from Women's Coalition | | |

Bangor West
| Party | Candidate | 1st Pref |
|---|---|---|
| Green (NI) | Brian Wilson | 1,593 |
| DUP | Robert Graham | 1,483 |
| UUP | Marion Smith | 1,024 |
| Alliance | Anne Wilson | 757 |
| DUP | Alan Leslie | 597 |
| SDLP | William Logan | 526 |
| Alliance | Tony Hill | 441 |
| UUP | James McKerrow | 432 |
| UK Unionist | William Keery | 374 |
| PUP | James Rea | 317 |
| Independent | Alan Field | 312 |
| NI Conservatives | Julian Robertson | 179 |
| Turnout | | 8,203 |
| Brian Wilson joins Green | | |
| DUP gain from UKUP | | |

Holywood
| Party | Candidate | 1st Pref |
|---|---|---|
| DUP | Gordon Dunne | 1,282 |
| Alliance | David Alderdice | 1,240 |
| UUP | Ellie McKay | 999 |
| UUP | Diana Peacocke | 603 |
| Green (NI) | John Barry | 577 |
| Alliance | Ian Parsley | 343 |
| Turnout | | 5,127 |
| Alliance gain from Independent | | |

=== Omagh ===
Election results, shaded by plurality of First Preference Votes

Mid Tyrone
| Party | Candidate | 1st Pref |
|---|---|---|
| Sinn Féin | John Clarke | 1,480 |
| Sinn Féin | Michael McAnespie | 1,203 |
| UUP | Bert Wilson | 1,084 |
| SDLP | Seamus Shields | 1,008 |
| DUP | Charles Chittick | 1,000 |
| Sinn Féin | Sharon O'Brien | 900 |
| Sinn Féin | Declan McAleer | 855 |
| Sinn Féin | Cathal McCrory | 741 |
| SDLP | Gerry O'Doherty | 692 |
| Turnout | | 9,150 |
| DUP gain from SDLP | | |

Omagh Town
| Party | Candidate | 1st Pref |
|---|---|---|
| DUP | Clive McFarland | 1,264 |
| Sinn Féin | Sean Begley | 1,153 |
| Independent | Paddy McGowan | 885 |
| SDLP | Josephine Deehan | 862 |
| UUP | Ross Hussey | 831 |
| Independent | Johnny McLaughlin | 641 |
| Sinn Féin | Martin McColgan | 568 |
| SDLP | Joe Byrne | 551 |
| Turnout | | 6,923 |
| Sinn Féin gain from SDLP | | |

West Tyrone
| Party | Candidate | 1st Pref |
|---|---|---|
| DUP | Thomas Buchanan | 1,810 |
| Sinn Féin | Barry McElduff | 1,471 |
| SDLP | Patrick McDonnell | 1,060 |
| Sinn Féin | Ann Quinn | 983 |
| Sinn Féin | Frankie Donnelly | 790 |
| UUP | Allan Rainey | 735 |
| Sinn Féin | Peter Kelly | 718 |
| SDLP | Liam McQuaid | 534 |
| UUP | William Bleakley | 518 |
| Turnout | | 8,792 |
| Sinn Féin gain from SDLP | | |

=== Strabane ===
Election results, shaded by plurality of First Preference Votes

Derg
| Party | Candidate | 1st Pref |
|---|---|---|
| DUP | Thomas Kerrigan | 1,125 |
| UUP | Derek Hussey | 1,106 |
| Sinn Féin | Charles McHugh | 1,079 |
| Sinn Féin | Kieran McGuire | 821 |
| Sinn Féin | Gerard Foley | 729 |
| DUP | Kathleen Craig | 588 |
| SDLP | Bernadette McNamee | 526 |
| PUP | Roy Reid | 64 |
| Turnout | | 6,151 |
| Sinn Féin gain from SDLP | | |

Glenelly
| Party | Candidate | 1st Pref |
|---|---|---|
| DUP | Allan Bresland | 1,539 |
| Sinn Féin | Claire McGill | 1,186 |
| DUP | John Donnell | 920 |
| UUP | James Emery | 885 |
| SDLP | Thomas McBride | 825 |
| Sinn Féin | Thomas O'Neill | 438 |
| Turnout | | 5,876 |
No change

Mourne
| Party | Candidate | 1st Pref |
|---|---|---|
| SDLP | Eugene McMenamin | 1,236 |
| Sinn Féin | Brian McMahon | 1,067 |
| Sinn Féin | Jarlath McNulty | 1,047 |
| Sinn Féin | Ivan Barr | 908 |
| Independent | James O'Kane | 737 |
| UUP | Alistair Patterson | 655 |
| Sinn Féin | Daniel Breslin | 566 |
| Independent | Paul Gallagher | 325 |
| SDLP | Ann Bell | 237 |
| SDLP | Arthur McGarrigle | 167 |
| Turnout | | 7,077 |
| Independent gain from SDLP | | |
