= 2005 Strabane District Council election =

Local govt election in Northern Ireland

← 2001	5 May 2005	2011 →

All 16 seats to Strabane District Council 9 seats needed for a majority
	First party	Second party	Third party
Party	Sinn Féin	DUP	SDLP
Seats won	8	3	2
Seat change	▲1	0	▼2
	Fourth party	Fifth party
Party	UUP	Independent
Seats won	2	1
Seat change	0	▲1
- Party with the most votes by district.

Elections to Strabane District Council were held on 5 May 2005 on the same day as the other Northern Irish local government elections. The election used three district electoral areas to elect a total of 16 councillors.

== Election results ==
Strabane District Council Election Result 2005
Party	Seats	Gains	Losses	Net gain/loss	Seats %	Votes %	Votes	+/−
Sinn Féin	8	1	0	▲1	50.0	41.8	7,841	▲1.6
DUP	3	0	0	0	18.8	22.2	4,172	▲3.3
SDLP	2	0	2	▼2	12.5	15.9	2,991	▼3.5
UUP	2	0	0	0	12.5	14.1	2,646	▼2.6
Independent	1	1	0	▲1	6.3	5.7	1,062	▲0.9
PUP	0	0	0	0	0.0	0.3	64	New

Note: "Votes" are the first preference votes.

== Districts summary ==
Results of the Strabane District Council election, 2005 by district
Ward	%	Cllrs	%	Cllrs	%	Cllrs	%	Cllrs	%	Cllrs	Total Cllrs
Ward	Sinn Féin		DUP		SDLP		UUP		Others		Total Cllrs
Derg	43.5	3	28.4	1	8.7	0	18.3	1	1.1	0	5
Glenelly	28.0	1	42.4	2	14.2	1	15.3	1	0.0	0	5
Mourne	50.3	4	0.0	0	23.6	1	9.4	0	16.7	1	6
Total	41.8	8	22.2	3	15.9	2	14.1	2	6.0	1	16

== District results ==
=== Derg ===
2001: 2 x Sinn Féin, 1 x DUP, 1 x UUP, 1 x SDLP
2005: 3 x Sinn Féin, 1 x DUP, 1 x UUP
2001-2005 Change: Sinn Féin gain from SDLP

Derg - 5 seats
Party	Candidate	FPv%	Count					
Party	Candidate	FPv%	1	2	3	4	5	6
DUP	Thomas Kerrigan*	18.63%	1,125					
UUP	Derek Hussey*	18.32%	1,106					
Sinn Féin	Charles McHugh*	17.87%	1,079					
Sinn Féin	Kieran McGuire	13.60%	821	822	822.1	962.2	962.4	979.92
Sinn Féin	Gerard Foley	12.07%	729	730	730.2	835.2	835.5	879.72
DUP	Kathleen Craig	9.74%	588	631	737.7	755.1	845.5	845.5
SDLP	Bernadette McNamee	8.71%	526	528	529			
PUP	Roy Reid	1.06%	64					
Electorate: 8,282 Valid: 6,038 (72.91%) Spoilt: 113 Quota: 1,007 Turnout: 6,151 (74.27%)

=== Glenelly ===
2001: 2 x DUP, 1 x Sinn Féin, 1 x UUP, 1 x SDLP
2005: 2 x DUP, 1 x Sinn Féin, 1 x UUP, 1 x SDLP
2001-2005 Change: No change

Glenelly - 5 seats
Party	Candidate	FPv%	Count			
Party	Candidate	FPv%	1	2	3	4
DUP	Allan Bresland*	26.57%	1,539			
Sinn Féin	Claire McGill*	20.47%	1,186			
DUP	John Donnell*	15.88%	920	1,457.24		
UUP	James Emery*	15.28%	885	908.68	1,359.71	
SDLP	Tom McBride*	14.24%	825	826.11	833.51	1,017.77
Sinn Féin	Thomas O'Neill	7.56%	438	438.37	438.74	438.74
Electorate: 7,882 Valid: 5,793 (73.50%) Spoilt: 83 Quota: 966 Turnout: 5,876 (74.55%)

=== Mourne ===
2001: 4 x Sinn Féin, 2 x SDLP
2005: 4 x Sinn Féin, 1 x SDLP, 1 x Independent
2001-2005 Change: Independent gain from SDLP

Mourne - 6 seats
Party	Candidate	FPv%	Count						
Party	Candidate	FPv%	1	2	3	4	5	6	7
SDLP	Eugene McMenamin*	17.80%	1,236						
Sinn Féin	Brian McMahon*	15.36%	1,067						
Sinn Féin	Jarlath McNulty*	15.08%	1,047						
Sinn Féin	Ivan Barr*	13.07%	908	926.2	945.03	954.98	969.63	1,019.63	
Independent	James O'Kane	10.61%	737	778.8	783.56	785.71	827.18	901.89	1,007.89
Sinn Féin	Daniel Breslin*	8.15%	566	572.2	616.09	651.99	663.08	723.44	793.24
UUP	Alastair Patterson	9.43%	655	657	657.6	657.65	662.05	664.05	686.25
SDLP	Ann Bell*	3.41%	237	308.8	309.85	310.6	478.97	508.67	
Independent	Paul Gallagher	4.68%	325	329.8	331.55	333.5	339.06		
SDLP	Arthur McGarrigle	2.40%	167	258	260.24	260.99			
Electorate: 10,459 Valid: 6,945 (66.40%) Spoilt: 132 Quota: 993 Turnout: 7,077 (67.66%)
