= 2001 Strabane District Council election =

Local govt election in Northern Ireland

← 1997	7 June 2001	2005 →

All 16 seats to Strabane District Council 9 seats needed for a majority
	First party	Second party	Third party
Party	Sinn Féin	SDLP	DUP
Seats won	7	4	3
Seat change	▲3	▼1	0
	Fourth party	Fifth party
Party	UUP	Independent
Seats won	2	0
Seat change	▼1	▼1
- Party with the most votes by district.

Elections to Strabane District Council were held on 7 June 2001 on the same day as the other Northern Irish local government elections. The election used three district electoral areas to elect a total of 16 councillors.

== Election results ==
Strabane District Council Election Result 2001
Party	Seats	Gains	Losses	Net gain/loss	Seats %	Votes %	Votes	+/−
Sinn Féin	7	3	0	▲3	43.8	40.2	8,627	▲7.1
SDLP	4	0	1	▼1	25.0	19.4	4,161	▼3.5
DUP	3	0	0	0	18.8	18.9	4,065	▲4.2
UUP	2	0	1	▼1	12.5	16.7	3,575	▼6.9
Independent	0	0	1	▼1	0.0	4.8	1,034	0.0

Note: "Votes" are the first preference votes.

== Districts summary ==
Results of the Strabane District Council election, 2001 by district
Ward	%	Cllrs	%	Cllrs	%	Cllrs	%	Cllrs	%	Cllrs	Total Cllrs
Ward	Sinn Féin		SDLP		DUP		UUP		Others		Total Cllrs
Derg	42.5	2	11.3	1	21.5	1	24.7	1	0.0	0	5
Glenelly	24.4	1	17.9	1	34.6	2	23.1	1	0.0	0	5
Mourne	50.3	4	27.1	2	4.9	0	5.3	0	12.4	0	6
Total	40.2	7	19.4	4	18.9	3	16.7	2	4.8	0	16

== District results ==
=== Derg ===
1997: 2 x UUP, 1 x Sinn Féin, 1 x DUP, 1 x SDLP
2001: 2 x Sinn Féin, 1 x UUP, 1 x DUP, 1 x SDLP
1997-2001 Change: Sinn Féin gain from UUP

Derg - 5 seats
Party	Candidate	FPv%	Count					
Party	Candidate	FPv%	1	2	3	4	5	6
Sinn Féin	Charles McHugh*	19.57%	1,331					
UUP	Derek Hussey*	16.32%	1,110	1,110.3	1,572.3			
Sinn Féin	Eamonn McGarvey	13.38%	910	962.5	962.5	962.5	1,513.5	
DUP	Thomas Kerrigan*	11.66%	793	793.3	839.45	1,075.45	1,084.05	1,084.05
SDLP	Bernadette McNamee	11.29%	768	785.85	797.85	814.85	903.4	984.4
DUP	Kathleen Allison	9.88%	672	672	709.15	866.15	866.15	866.15
Sinn Féin	Gerard Foley	9.57%	651	773.1	773.1	773.1		
UUP	Edward Turner*	8.31%	565	565.3				
Electorate: 8,455 Valid: 6,800 (80.43%) Spoilt: 132 Quota: 1,134 Turnout: 6,932 (81.99%)

=== Glenelly ===
1997: 2 x DUP, 1 x Sinn Féin, 1 x UUP, 1 x SDLP
2001: 2 x DUP, 1 x Sinn Féin, 1 x UUP, 1 x SDLP
1997-2001 Change: No change

Glenelly - 5 seats
Party	Candidate	FPv%	Count					
Party	Candidate	FPv%	1	2	3	4	5	6
DUP	Allan Bresland*	20.75%	1,313					
SDLP	Tom McBride*	17.90%	1,133					
DUP	John Donnell*	13.89%	879	1,088.57				
UUP	James Emery*	13.84%	876	887.02	889.54	907.03	1,461.03	
Sinn Féin	Claire McGill	14.84%	939	939	979.59	979.59	980.96	1,002.96
Sinn Féin	Martin Conway*	9.53%	603	603.76	633.82	633.91	635.42	663.42
UUP	Robert Craig	9.24%	585	611.41	615.01	625.96		
Electorate: 7,867 Valid: 6,328 (80.44%) Spoilt: 128 Quota: 1,055 Turnout: 6,456 (82.06%)

=== Mourne ===
1997: 3 x SDLP, 2 x Sinn Féin, 1 x Independent Nationalist
2001: 4 x Sinn Féin, 2 x SDLP
1997-2001 Change: Sinn Féin (two seats) gain from SDLP and Independent Nationalist

Mourne - 6 seats
Party	Candidate	FPv%	Count							
Party	Candidate	FPv%	1	2	3	4	5	6	7	8
SDLP	Eugene McMenamin*	18.45%	1,538							
Sinn Féin	Jarlath McNulty*	15.91%	1,326							
Sinn Féin	Ivan Barr*	15.14%	1,262							
Sinn Féin	Brian McMahon	11.72%	977	993.79	1,023.49	1,049.74	1,049.74	1,069.3	1,193.3	
SDLP	Ann Bell*	5.26%	438	565.19	568.79	573.64	575.87	839.76	904.91	1,216.43
Sinn Féin	Daniel Breslin	7.54%	628	634.67	714.27	736.32	736.32	757.16	835.92	951.21
UUP	Sam Martin	5.27%	439	443.14	443.24	443.29	793.75	802.9	806.13	854.89
Independent	James O'Kane*	7.07%	589	637.07	642.87	646.27	671.27	715.04	796.39	
Independent	Paul Gallagher	5.34%	445	456.96	463.36	465.76	465.76	490.02		
SDLP	Fred Henry	3.41%	284	406.82	409.32	411.17	420.17			
DUP	Kathleen Craig	4.90%	408	409.15	409.15	409.2				
Electorate: 10,990 Valid: 8,334 (75.83%) Spoilt: 197 Quota: 1,191 Turnout: 8,531 (77.63%)
