= 1989 Strabane District Council election =

Local govt election in Northern Ireland

| ← 1985 | 17 May 1989 | 1993 → |

All 15 seats to Strabane District Council 8 seats needed for a majority
| | First party | Second party | Third party |
|---|---|---|---|
| Party | DUP | UUP | SDLP |
| Seats won | 3 | 3 | 3 |
| Seat change | ▼1 | 0 | 0 |
| | Fourth party | Fifth party | Sixth party |
| Party | Sinn Féin | Ind. Nationalist | Alliance |
| Seats won | 2 | 2 | 1 |
| Seat change | ▼1 | 0 | ▲1 |
| | Seventh party |
| Party | Ind. Unionist |
| Seats won | 1 |
| Seat change | ▲1 |

Elections to Strabane District Council were held on 17 May 1989 on the same day as the other Northern Irish local government elections. The election used three district electoral areas to elect a total of 15 councillors.

== Election results ==
Strabane District Council Election Result 1989
| Party | Seats | Gains | Losses | Net gain/loss | Seats % | Votes % | Votes | +/− |
|---|---|---|---|---|---|---|---|---|
| UUP | 3 | 0 | 0 | 0 | 20.0 | 20.3 | 3,358 | ▲1.2 |
| DUP | 3 | 0 | 1 | ▼1 | 20.0 | 19.7 | 3,251 | ▼6.4 |
| SDLP | 3 | 1 | 1 | 0 | 20.0 | 17.9 | 2,955 | ▼1.2 |
| Sinn Féin | 2 | 0 | 1 | ▼1 | 13.3 | 21.1 | 3,484 | ▼1.2 |
| Ind. Nationalist | 2 | 1 | 1 | 0 | 13.3 | 14.8 | 2,445 | ▲1.4 |
| Ind. Unionist | 1 | 1 | 0 | ▲1 | 6.7 | 5.0 | 827 | ▲5.0 |
| Alliance | 1 | 1 | 0 | ▲1 | 6.7 | 1.1 | 187 | ▲1.1 |

Note: "Votes" are the first preference votes.

== Districts summary ==
Results of the Strabane District Council election, 1989 by district
| Ward | % | Cllrs | % | Cllrs | % | Cllrs | % | Cllrs | % | Cllrs | % | Cllrs | Total Cllrs |
| Ward | UUP | | DUP | | SDLP | | Sinn Féin | | Alliance | | Others | | Total Cllrs |
|---|---|---|---|---|---|---|---|---|---|---|---|---|---|
| Derg | 19.0 | 1 | 25.2 | 1 | 10.6 | 1 | 21.1 | 1 | 1.1 | 0 | 23.0 | 1 | 5 |
| Glenelly | 26.5 | 1 | 36.2 | 2 | 24.6 | 1 | 10.2 | 0 | 2.5 | 1 | 0.0 | 0 | 5 |
| Mourne | 16.2 | 1 | 0.0 | 0 | 18.9 | 1 | 30.6 | 1 | 0.0 | 0 | 34.3 | 2 | 5 |
| Total | 20.3 | 3 | 19.7 | 3 | 17.9 | 3 | 21.1 | 2 | 1.1 | 1 | 19.9 | 2 | 15 |

== District results ==
=== Derg ===
1985: 2 x DUP, 1 x Sinn Féin, 1 x UUP, 1 x Independent Nationalist
1989: 1 x DUP, 1 x Sinn Féin, 1 x UUP, 1 x SDLP, 1 x Independent Unionist
1985-1989 Change: SDLP and Independent Unionist gain from DUP and Independent Nationalist

Derg - 5 seats
| Party | Candidate | FPv% | Count | | | | | |
| Party | Candidate | FPv% | 1 | 2 | 3 | 4 | 5 | 6 |
|---|---|---|---|---|---|---|---|---|
| UUP | Edward Turner* | 18.97% | 1,050 | | | | | |
| DUP | Thomas Kerrigan* | 17.52% | 970 | | | | | |
| Sinn Féin | Charles McHugh* | 16.76% | 928 | | | | | |
| Ind. Unionist | Derek Hussey | 14.94% | 827 | 890.48 | 915.24 | 915.24 | 924.8 | |
| SDLP | Laurence McNamee | 10.64% | 589 | 589.12 | 608.24 | 663.36 | 663.56 | 932.56 |
| DUP | Desmond Monteith | 7.70% | 426 | 478.8 | 485.6 | 486.6 | 514.72 | 519.72 |
| Ind. Nationalist | Denis McCrory* | 8.00% | 443 | 444.56 | 454.68 | 496.68 | 497 | |
| Sinn Féin | Thomas McNamee* | 4.34% | 240 | 240.12 | 241.12 | | | |
| Alliance | James Smyth | 1.14% | 63 | 69 | | | | |
Electorate: 7,611 Valid: 5,536 (72.74%) Spoilt: 175 Quota: 923 Turnout: 5,711 (75.04%)

=== Glenelly ===
1985: 2 x DUP, 1 x UUP, 1 x SDLP, 1 x Sinn Féin
1989: 2 x DUP, 1 x UUP, 1 x SDLP, 1 x Alliance
1985-1989 Change: Alliance gain from Sinn Féin

Glenelly - 5 seats
| Party | Candidate | FPv% | Count | | | | | |
| Party | Candidate | FPv% | 1 | 2 | 3 | 4 | 5 | 6 |
|---|---|---|---|---|---|---|---|---|
| UUP | James Emery | 26.52% | 1,359 | | | | | |
| DUP | John Donnell | 21.82% | 1,118 | | | | | |
| SDLP | John Gallagher* | 20.20% | 1,035 | | | | | |
| DUP | Samuel Rogers* | 14.38% | 737 | 1,186.54 | | | | |
| Alliance | Hughes Colhoun | 2.42% | 124 | 168.46 | 473.71 | 684.71 | 748.18 | 835.78 |
| Sinn Féin | Martin Forbes | 10.27% | 526 | 526.76 | 527.31 | 530.31 | 580.31 | 671.91 |
| SDLP | Brian Logue | 4.39% | 225 | 229.18 | 253.93 | 272.93 | | |
Electorate: 7,347 Valid: 5,124 (69.74%) Spoilt: 156 Quota: 855 Turnout: 5,280 (71.87%)

=== Mourne ===
1985: 2 x SDLP, 1 x Sinn Féin, 1 x UUP, 1 x Independent Nationalist
1989: 2 x Independent Nationalist, 1 x SDLP, 1 x Sinn Féin, 1 x UUP
1985-1989 Change: Independent Nationalist leaves SDLP

Mourne - 5 seats
| Party | Candidate | FPv% | Count | | | | |
| Party | Candidate | FPv% | 1 | 2 | 3 | 4 | 5 |
|---|---|---|---|---|---|---|---|
| Sinn Féin | Ivan Barr* | 22.70% | 1,327 | | | | |
| Ind. Nationalist | Peggy McManus* | 19.21% | 1,123 | | | | |
| Ind. Nationalist | James O'Kane* | 15.03% | 879 | 907.56 | 978.96 | | |
| SDLP | Joseph McElroy | 10.96% | 641 | 656.68 | 688.98 | 833.27 | 1,030.27 |
| UUP | John Cummings* | 16.23% | 949 | 950.68 | 952.89 | 953.34 | 953.51 |
| Sinn Féin | Ultan McNulty | 7.92% | 463 | 750.28 | 772.04 | 781.28 | 795.21 |
| SDLP | Bernard Mullen | 4.34% | 254 | 260.16 | 270.36 | 305.21 | |
| SDLP | Bernard McDermott | 3.61% | 211 | 216.32 | 224.99 | | |
Electorate: 9,609 Valid: 5,847 (60.85%) Spoilt: 211 Quota: 975 Turnout: 6,058 (63.05%)
