= 2011 Strabane District Council election =

Local govt election in Northern Ireland

- 5 May 2011

All 16 seats to Strabane District Council 9 seats needed for a majority
	First party	Second party	Third party
Party	Sinn Féin	DUP	Independent
Seats won	8	4	2
Seat change	0	▲1	▲1
	Fourth party	Fifth party
Party	UUP	SDLP
Seats won	1	1
Seat change	▼1	▼1
- Party with the most votes by district.

Elections to Strabane District Council were held on 5 May 2011 on the same day as the other Northern Irish local government elections. The election used three district electoral areas to elect a total of 16 councillors.

== Election results ==
Strabane District Council Election Result 2011
Party	Seats	Gains	Losses	Net gain/loss	Seats %	Votes %	Votes	+/−
Sinn Féin	8	1	1	0	50.0	39.3	6,834	▼2.5
DUP	4	1	0	▲1	25.0	23.2	4,039	▲1.0
Independent	2	1	0	▲1	12.5	10.9	1,891	▲5.2
UUP	1	0	1	▼1	6.3	13.6	2,359	▼0.5
SDLP	1	0	1	▼1	6.3	9.2	1,605	▼6.7
Irish Republican Socialist	0	0	0	0	0.0	3.8	666	New

Note: "Votes" are the first preference votes.

== Districts summary ==
Results of the Strabane District Council election, 2011 by district
Ward	%	Cllrs	%	Cllrs	%	Cllrs	%	Cllrs	%	Cllrs	Total Cllrs
Ward	Sinn Féin		DUP		UUP		SDLP		Others		Total Cllrs
Derg	40.2	3	24.6	1	22.7	1	4.6	0	7.9	0	5
Glenelly	31.7	2	47.9	3	10.5	0	10.0	0	0.0	0	5
Mourne	45.1	3	0.0	0	7.9	0	12.6	1	34.4	2	6
Total	39.3	8	23.2	4	13.6	1	9.2	1	14.7	2	16

== District results ==
=== Derg ===
2005: 3 x Sinn Féin, 1 x DUP, 1 x UUP
2011: 3 x Sinn Féin, 1 x DUP, 1 x UUP
2005-2011 Change: No change

Derg - 5 seats
Party	Candidate	FPv%	Count						
Party	Candidate	FPv%	1	2	3	4	5	6	7
Sinn Féin	Kieran McGuire*	15.40%	912	937	999				
Sinn Féin	Ruairí McHugh	14.89%	882	928	993				
DUP	Thomas Kerrigan*	15.72%	931	935	940	940	1,356		
UUP	Derek Hussey*	13.72%	813	829	836	836	919	919	1,146
Sinn Féin	Maolíosa McHugh	9.93%	588	634	833	844	846	848	849
UUP	Ryan Moses	8.96%	531	540	545	545	567	567	658
DUP	Kathleen Craig	8.88%	526	532	535	535			
Independent	Gerard Foley*	7.88%	467	527					
SDLP	Charlie McNamee	4.63%	274						
Electorate: 8,788 Valid: 5,924 (67.41%) Spoilt: 124 Quota: 988 Turnout: 6,048 (68.82%)

=== Glenelly ===
2005: 2 x DUP, 1 x Sinn Féin, 1 x UUP, 1 x SDLP
2011: 3 x DUP, 2 x Sinn Féin
2005-2011 Change: DUP and Sinn Féin gain from UUP and SDLP

Glenelly - 5 seats
Party	Candidate	FPv%	Count					
Party	Candidate	FPv%	1	2	3	4	5	6
DUP	Allan Bresland*	28.93%	1,560					
Sinn Féin	Dan Kelly	20.31%	1,095					
DUP	John Donnell*	11.50%	620	1,191.2				
DUP	Rhonda Hamilton	7.46%	402	463.32	738.32	738.32	1,089.32	
Sinn Féin	Michelle McMackin	11.37%	613	613	613	778.24	781.82	785.82
SDLP	Tom McBride*	10.48%	565	566.68	568.22	591.98	650.64	775.64
UUP	Flora Magee	6.18%	333	339.72	347.64	348.36		
UUP	Joe McCormick	3.78%	204	212.82	218.98	219.34		
Electorate: 8,408 Valid: 5,392 (64.13%) Spoilt: 103 Quota: 899 Turnout: 5,495 (65.35%)

=== Mourne ===
2005: 4 x Sinn Féin, 1 x SDLP, 1 x Independent
2011: 3 x Sinn Féin, 2 x Independent, 1 x SDLP
2005-2011 Change: Independent gain from Sinn Féin

Mourne - 6 seats
Party	Candidate	FPv%	Count							
Party	Candidate	FPv%	1	2	3	4	5	6	7	8
Independent	James O'Kane*	14.13%	859	931						
Sinn Féin	Brian McMahon*	14.07%	855	870						
Independent	Eugene McMenamin*	9.30%	565	624	647	869				
Sinn Féin	Jay McCauley	11.29%	686	698	702	704	1,046			
Sinn Féin	Karina Carlin	11.17%	679	685	690	690	814	987.28		
SDLP	Patsy Kelly	6.50%	395	583	603	664	691	693.85	706.96	707.76
Irish Republican Socialist	Paul Gallagher	10.96%	666	674	678	680	695	695	706.97	707.13
Sinn Féin	Stephen Dunnion	8.62%	524	529	530	531				
UUP	Billy Harpur	7.86%	478	481	481					
SDLP	Eugene Mullen	6.10%	371							
Electorate: 10,602 Valid: 6,078 (57.33%) Spoilt: 142 Quota: 869 Turnout: 6,220 (58.67%)
