= 1993 Strabane District Council election =

Local govt election in Northern Ireland

← 1989	19 May 1993	1997 →

All 16 seats to Strabane District Council 9 seats needed for a majority
	First party	Second party	Third party
Party	SDLP	UUP	DUP
Seats won	5	4	3
Seat change	▲2	▲1	0
	Fourth party	Fifth party	Sixth party
Party	Sinn Féin	Ind. Nationalist	Ind. Unionist
Seats won	2	1	1
Seat change	0	▼1	0
	Seventh party
Party	Alliance
Seats won	0
Seat change	▼1
- Party with the most votes by district.

Elections to Strabane District Council were held on 19 May 1993 on the same day as the other Northern Irish local government elections. The election used three district electoral areas to elect a total of 16 councillors.

== Election results ==
Strabane District Council Election Result 1993
Party	Seats	Gains	Losses	Net gain/loss	Seats %	Votes %	Votes	+/−
SDLP	5	2	0	▲2	31.3	27.3	4,603	▲9.4
UUP	4	1	0	▲1	25.0	19.9	3,349	▼0.4
DUP	3	0	0	0	18.8	19.9	3,361	▲0.2
Sinn Féin	2	0	0	0	25.0	21.1	3,561	0.0
Ind. Nationalist	1	0	1	▼1	6.3	5.3	886	▼9.5
Ind. Unionist	1	0	0	0	6.3	3.3	551	▼1.7
Alliance	0	0	1	▼1	0.0	2.2	367	▲1.1
Democratic Left	0	0	0	0	0.0	0.8	136	New
Independent	0	0	0	0	0.0	0.2	39	▲0.2

Note: "Votes" are the first preference votes.

== Districts summary ==
Results of the Strabane District Council election, 1993 by district
Ward	%	Cllrs	%	Cllrs	%	Cllrs	%	Cllrs	%	Cllrs	Total Cllrs
Ward	SDLP		UUP		DUP		Sinn Féin		Others		Total Cllrs
Derg	20.0	1	19.0	1	26.2	1	24.3	1	10.5	1	5
Glenelly	22.9	1	24.9	2	35.7	2	8.8	0	7.7	0	5
Mourne	38.3	3	16.3	1	0.0	0	29.0	1	16.4	1	6
Total	27.3	5	19.9	4	19.9	3	21.1	3	11.8	1	16

== District results ==
=== Derg ===
1989: 1 x DUP, 1 x Sinn Féin, 1 x SDLP, 1 x UUP, 1 x Independent Unionist
1993: 1 x DUP, 1 x Sinn Féin, 1 x SDLP, 1 x UUP, 1 x Independent Unionist
1989-1993 Change: No change

Derg - 5 seats
Party	Candidate	FPv%	Count					
Party	Candidate	FPv%	1	2	3	4	5	6
SDLP	Laurence McNamee*	19.95%	1,131					
UUP	Edward Turner*	18.97%	1,075					
Sinn Féin	Charles McHugh*	17.52%	993					
DUP	Thomas Kerrigan*	15.98%	906	909.74	917.44	965.56		
Ind. Unionist	Derek Hussey*	9.72%	551	556.44	569.54	626.42	636.16	649.16
DUP	Samuel Allison	10.18%	577	579.72	580.4	601.16	610.92	616.92
Sinn Féin	Sean Elliott	6.81%	386	488.68	506.24	506.36		
Ind. Nationalist	Denis McCrory	0.86%	49	117				
Electorate: 7,995 Valid: 5,668 (70.89%) Spoilt: 166 Quota: 945 Turnout: 5,834 (72.97%)

=== Glenelly ===
1989: 2 x DUP, 1 x UUP, 1 x SDLP, 1 x Alliance
1993: 2 x DUP, 2 x UUP, 1 x SDLP
1989-1993 Change: UUP gain from Alliance

Glenelly - 5 seats
Party	Candidate	FPv%	Count						
Party	Candidate	FPv%	1	2	3	4	5	6	7
SDLP	John Gallagher*	18.39%	968						
UUP	James Emery*	16.64%	876	879					
DUP	Allan Bresland	15.67%	825	830	830.5	974.5			
DUP	John Donnell*	14.32%	754	765	765.1	890.1			
UUP	Samuel Martin	8.26%	435	435	435.1	453.1	544.18	546.38	686.45
Sinn Féin	Patrick Kelly	8.83%	465	466	472.5	472.5	472.5	544.1	595.3
Alliance	John Devine	6.97%	367	380	391.9	394	397.96	506.66	
SDLP	Bernard McDermott	4.50%	237	239	308.6	308.6	309.59		
DUP	Derek Reaney	5.68%	299	299	299.2				
Independent	Hughes Colhoun*	0.74%	39						
Electorate: 7,432 Valid: 5,265 (70.84%) Spoilt: 143 Quota: 878 Turnout: 5,408 (72.77%)

=== Mourne ===
1989: 2 x Independent Nationalist, 1 x SDLP, 1 x Sinn Féin, 1 x UUP
1993: 3 x SDLP, 1 x Sinn Féin, 1 x UUP, 1 x Independent Nationalist
1989-1993 Change: SDLP (two seats) gain from Independent Nationalist and due to the addition of one seat

Mourne - 6 seats
Party	Candidate	FPv%	Count				
Party	Candidate	FPv%	1	2	3	4	5
Sinn Féin	Ivan Barr*	20.76%	1,229				
UUP	John Cummings*	16.27%	963				
SDLP	Mary McElroy	15.63%	925				
Ind. Nationalist	James O'Kane*	14.14%	837	879.24			
SDLP	Thomas Mullen	12.72%	753	813.39	855.39		
SDLP	Paul O'Hare	9.95%	589	610.78	643.75	759.03	831.73
Sinn Féin	Elayne McNicholl	8.24%	488	723.29	737.6	738.48	740.68
Democratic Left	Francis McCay	2.30%	136	150.85			
Electorate: 9,783 Valid: 5,920 (60.51%) Spoilt: 231 Quota: 846 Turnout: 6,151 (62.87%)
