= 1985 Strabane District Council election =

Local govt election in Northern Ireland

← 1981	15 May 1985	1989 →

All 15 seats to Strabane District Council 8 seats needed for a majority
	First party	Second party	Third party
Party	DUP	UUP	SDLP
Seats won	4	3	3
Seat change	0	0	▼1
	Fourth party	Fifth party
Party	Sinn Féin	Ind. Nationalist
Seats won	3	2
Seat change	▲3	▼2

Elections to Strabane District Council were held on 15 May 1985 on the same day as the other Northern Irish local government elections. The election used three district electoral areas to elect a total of 15 councillors.

== Election results ==
Strabane District Council Election Result 1985
Party	Seats	Gains	Losses	Net gain/loss	Seats %	Votes %	Votes	+/−
DUP	4	0	0	0	26.7	26.1	4,525	▲1.0
Sinn Féin	3	3	0	▲3	20.0	22.3	3,887	New
SDLP	3	0	1	▼1	20.0	19.1	3,319	▼3.7
UUP	3	0	0	0	20.0	19.1	3,313	▼1.6
Ind. Nationalist	2	0	2	▼2	13.3	13.4	2,326	▼12.7

Note: "Votes" are the first preference votes.

== Districts summary ==
Results of the Strabane District Council election, 1985 by district
Ward	%	Cllrs	%	Cllrs	%	Cllrs	%	Cllrs	%	Cllrs	Total Cllrs
Ward	DUP		Sinn Féin		SDLP		UUP		Others		Total Cllrs
Derg	33.2	2	26.2	1	9.2	0	23.2	1	8.2	1	5
Glenelly	35.2	2	13.2	1	17.9	1	23.5	1	10.2	0	5
Mourne	9.3	0	27.9	1	30.6	2	10.1	1	22.1	1	5
Total	26.1	4	22.3	3	19.1	3	19.1	3	13.4	2	15

== District results ==
=== Derg ===
1985: 2 x DUP, 1 x Sinn Féin, 1 x UUP, 1 x Independent Nationalist

Derg - 5 seats
Party	Candidate	FPv%	Count					
Party	Candidate	FPv%	1	2	3	4	5	6
Sinn Féin	Charles McHugh	26.25%	1,534					
UUP	Edward Turner	23.22%	1,357					
DUP	Thomas Kerrigan*	21.74%	1,270					
Ind. Nationalist	Denis McCrory*	8.21%	480	901.88	927.98	930.74	992.35	
DUP	David Baird	4.38%	256	256	441.1	669.95	670.87	680.12
DUP	Noel Finlayson	7.03%	411	411	564	617.36	618.79	630.74
SDLP	James Fitzsimons	5.61%	328	392.13	400.23	402.07	568.99	
SDLP	William Flanagan	3.54%	207	275.9	278.6	280.44		
Electorate: 7,333 Valid: 5,843 (79.68%) Spoilt: 95 Quota: 974 Turnout: 5,938 (80.98%)

=== Glenelly ===
1985: 2 x DUP, 1 x UUP, 1 x SDLP, 1 x Sinn Féin

Glenelly - 5 seats
Party	Candidate	FPv%	Count				
Party	Candidate	FPv%	1	2	3	4	5
UUP	Mary Britton*	23.56%	1,381				
SDLP	John Gallagher*	17.93%	1,051				
DUP	Samuel Rogers*	16.58%	972	1,164			
DUP	Ronald Brolly	13.56%	795	925.56	1,021.56		
Sinn Féin	Thomas McNamee	13.17%	722	772.96	772.96	773.96	794.2
Ind. Nationalist	Francis McConnell*	10.17%	596	604	606.56	656.36	702.8
DUP	Violet McGerrigle	5.02%	294	359.92	434.48		
Electorate: 7,340 Valid: 5,861 (79.85%) Spoilt: 117 Quota: 977 Turnout: 5,978 (81.44%)

=== Mourne ===
1985: 2 x SDLP, 1 x Sinn Féin, 1 x UUP, 1 x Independent Nationalist

Mourne - 5 seats
Party	Candidate	FPv%	Count					
Party	Candidate	FPv%	1	2	3	4	5	6
Sinn Féin	Ivan Barr	27.90%	1,581					
Ind. Nationalist	James O'Kane*	22.06%	1,250					
SDLP	Paul O'Hare*	13.36%	757	1,090.7				
SDLP	Peggy McManus	10.38%	588	745.62	921.3	1,005.79		
UUP	John Cummings	10.15%	575	582.81	591.81	593.23	593.23	1,088.95
SDLP	Mary McCrea*	6.85%	388	512.25	628.17	680	735.38	747.59
DUP	Desmond Monteith	9.30%	527	531.26	534.5	535.21	535.92	
Electorate: 8,536 Valid: 5,666 (66.38%) Spoilt: 130 Quota: 945 Turnout: 5,796 (67.90%)
