= Derg (District Electoral Area) =

District electoral area in Northern Ireland

- Derry and Strabane District Council DEA constituency

Current constituency
- Created: 1985
- Seats: 5 (1985-)
- Councillors: Caroline Devine (SF); Derek Hussey (UUP); Keith Kerrigan (DUP); Ruairí McHugh (SF); Antaine Ó Fearghail (SF)

Derg DEA within Derry City and Strabane

Derg DEA (1993–2014) within Strabane

Derg is one of the seven district electoral areas (DEA) in Derry and Strabane, Northern Ireland. The district elects five members to Derry and Strabane District Council and contains the wards of Castlederg, Finn, Glenderg, Newtownstewart and Sion Mills. Derg forms part of the West Tyrone constituencies for the Northern Ireland Assembly and UK Parliament.

It was created for the 1985 local elections, replacing Strabane Area A which had existed since 1973, where it originally contained five wards (Castlederg, Clare, Finn, Glenderg and Newtownstewart). For the 2014 local elections it remained at five wards but gained Sion Mills from the abolished Mourne DEA.

== Councillors ==
Election	Councillor (party)	Councillor (party)	Councillor (party)	Councillor (party)	Councillor (party)
2023	Ruairí McHugh (Sinn Féin)	Caroline Devine (Sinn Féin)	Antaine Ó Fearghail (Sinn Féin)	Derek Hussey (UUP)/ (Independent)	Keith Kerrigan (DUP)
January 2022 defection	Ruairí McHugh (Sinn Féin)	Kieran McGuire (Sinn Féin)	Steven Edwards (SDLP)	Derek Hussey (UUP)/ (Independent)	Keith Kerrigan (DUP)
November 2020 co-option	Ruairí McHugh (Sinn Féin)	Kieran McGuire (Sinn Féin)	Steven Edwards (SDLP)	Derek Hussey (UUP)/ (Independent)	Keith Kerrigan (DUP)
June 2020 co-option	Ruairí McHugh (Sinn Féin)	Kieran McGuire (Sinn Féin)	Steven Edwards (SDLP)	Andy McKane (UUP)	Keith Kerrigan (DUP)
August 2019 co-option	Ruairí McHugh (Sinn Féin)	Kieran McGuire (Sinn Féin)	Cara Hunter (SDLP)	Andy McKane (UUP)	Keith Kerrigan (DUP)
2019	Ruairí McHugh (Sinn Féin)	Kieran McGuire (Sinn Féin)	Cara Hunter (SDLP)	Derek Hussey (UUP)/ (Independent Unionist)	Thomas Kerrigan (DUP)
2014	Ruairí McHugh (Sinn Féin)	Kieran McGuire (Sinn Féin)	Maolíosa McHugh (Sinn Féin)	Derek Hussey (UUP)/ (Independent Unionist)	Thomas Kerrigan (DUP)
2011	Ruairí McHugh (Sinn Féin)	Kieran McGuire (Sinn Féin)	Maolíosa McHugh (Sinn Féin)	Derek Hussey (UUP)/ (Independent Unionist)	Thomas Kerrigan (DUP)
2005	Charles McHugh (Sinn Féin)	Kieran McGuire (Sinn Féin)	Gerard Foley (Sinn Féin)	Derek Hussey (UUP)/ (Independent Unionist)	Thomas Kerrigan (DUP)
2001	Charles McHugh (Sinn Féin)	Bernadette McNamee (SDLP)	Eamonn McGarvey (Sinn Féin)	Derek Hussey (UUP)/ (Independent Unionist)	Thomas Kerrigan (DUP)
1997	Charles McHugh (Sinn Féin)	Tomás Murtagh (SDLP)	Edward Turner (UUP)	Derek Hussey (UUP)/ (Independent Unionist)	Thomas Kerrigan (DUP)
1993	Charles McHugh (Sinn Féin)	Laurence McNamee (SDLP)	Edward Turner (UUP)	Derek Hussey (UUP)/ (Independent Unionist)	Thomas Kerrigan (DUP)
1989	Charles McHugh (Sinn Féin)	Laurence McNamee (SDLP)	Edward Turner (UUP)	Derek Hussey (UUP)/ (Independent Unionist)	Thomas Kerrigan (DUP)
1985	Charles McHugh (Sinn Féin)	Denis McCrory (Independent Nationalist)	Edward Turner (UUP)	David Baird (DUP)	Thomas Kerrigan (DUP)

== 2023 election ==
2019: 2 x Sinn Féin, 1 x DUP, 1 x UUP, 1 x SDLP

2023: 3 x Sinn Féin, 1 x DUP, 1 x UUP

2019–2023 change: Sinn Féin gain from SDLP

Derg - 5 seats
Party	Candidate	FPv%	Count				
Party	Candidate	FPv%	1	2	3	4	5
DUP	Keith Kerrigan*	19.52%	1,669				
Sinn Féin	Ruairí McHugh*	16.87%	1,442				
UUP	Derek Hussey*	16.11%	1,377	1,592.88			
Sinn Féin	Antaine Ó Fearghail	14.00%	1,197	1,197.00	1,197.28	1,255.28	1,371.56
Sinn Féin	Caroline Devine	14.57%	1,246	1,246.14	1,246.28	1,306.28	1,342.56
SDLP	Steven Edwards*	8.46%	723	726.78	748.20	888.74	1,151.34
Independent	Andy Patton	5.93%	507	514.42	586.94	689.24	
Alliance	Anne Murray	2.07%	177	178.26	207.24		
People Before Profit	Adam McGinley	1.31%	112	112.56	120.68		
Aontú	Leza Houston	1.16%	99	99.00	102.78		
Electorate: 13,672 Valid: 8,549 (62.53%) Spoilt: 111 Quota: 1,425 Turnout: 8,660 (63.33%)

== 2019 election ==
2014: 3 x Sinn Féin, 1 x DUP, 1 x UUP

2019: 2 x Sinn Féin, 1 x DUP, 1 x UUP, 1 x SDLP

2014-2019 change: SDLP gain from Sinn Féin

Derg - 5 seats
Party	Candidate	FPv%	Count				
Party	Candidate	FPv%	1	2	3	4	5
DUP	Keith Kerrigan	13.62%	1,090	1,092	1,711		
UUP	Derek Hussey* –††‡	15.83%	1,267	1,279	1,418		
Sinn Féin	Ruairí McHugh*	13.57%	1,086	1,089	1,089	1,089	1,579
SDLP	Cara Hunter †	12.89%	1,032	1,092	1,094	1,194	1,287
Sinn Féin	Kieran McGuire*	13.43%	1,075	1,081	1,081	1,081	1,232
Independent	Andy Patton	9.18%	735	784	791	922	981
Sinn Féin	Maolíosa McHugh*	9.97%	798	806	807	808	
DUP	Thomas Kerrigan*	9.63%	771	773			
Alliance	Anne Murray	1.87%	150				
Electorate: 12,996 Valid: 8,004 (61.59%) Spoilt: 116 Quota: 1,335 Turnout: 8,120 (62.48%)

== 2014 election ==
2011: 3 x Sinn Féin, 1 x DUP, 1 x UUP

2014: 3 x Sinn Féin, 1 x DUP, 1 x UUP

2011-2014 change: No change

Derg - 5 seats
Party	Candidate	FPv%	Count				
Party	Candidate	FPv%	1	2	3	4	5
UUP	Derek Hussey*	18.56%	1,411				
DUP	Thomas Kerrigan*	12.15%	924	1,007.1	1,020	1,313	
Sinn Féin	Maolíosa McHugh*	13.87%	1,055	1,055.1	1,101.1	1,101.1	1,254.4
Sinn Féin	Kieran McGuire*	14.10%	1,072	1,072.4	1,148.4	1,148.6	1,237.6
Sinn Féin	Ruairí McHugh*	14.49%	1,102	1,102.1	1,136.1	1,138.1	1,229.1
DUP	Sharon Smyth	9.11%	693	713	714.1	934.7	971.7
SDLP	Jim McIntyre	5.47%	416	417.7	630.6	642.2	
TUV	Robert Oliver	6.85%	521	550.8	557		
SDLP	Marie Ash	5.39%	410	412.7			
Electorate: 12,526 Valid: 7,604 (60.71%) Spoilt: 111 Quota: 1,268 Turnout: 7,715 (61.59%)

== 2011 election ==
2005: 3 x Sinn Féin, 1 x DUP, 1 x UUP

2011: 3 x Sinn Féin, 1 x DUP, 1 x UUP

2005-2011 change: No change

Derg - 5 seats
Party	Candidate	FPv%	Count						
Party	Candidate	FPv%	1	2	3	4	5	6	7
Sinn Féin	Kieran McGuire*	15.40%	912	937	999				
Sinn Féin	Ruairí McHugh	14.89%	882	928	993				
DUP	Thomas Kerrigan*	15.72%	931	935	940	940	1,356		
UUP	Derek Hussey*	13.72%	813	829	836	836	919	919	1,146
Sinn Féin	Maolíosa McHugh	9.93%	588	634	833	844	846	848	849
UUP	Ryan Moses	8.96%	531	540	545	545	567	567	658
DUP	Kathleen Craig	8.88%	526	532	535	535			
Independent	Gerard Foley*	7.88%	467	527					
SDLP	Charlie McNamee	4.63%	274						
Electorate: 8,788 Valid: 5,924 (67.41%) Spoilt: 124 Quota: 988 Turnout: 6,048 (68.82%)

== 2005 election ==
2001: 2 x Sinn Féin, 1 x DUP, 1 x UUP, 1 x SDLP

2005: 3 x Sinn Féin, 1 x DUP, 1 x UUP

2001-2005 change: Sinn Féin gain from SDLP

Derg - 5 seats
Party	Candidate	FPv%	Count					
Party	Candidate	FPv%	1	2	3	4	5	6
DUP	Thomas Kerrigan*	18.63%	1,125					
UUP	Derek Hussey*	18.32%	1,106					
Sinn Féin	Charles McHugh*	17.87%	1,079					
Sinn Féin	Kieran McGuire	13.60%	821	822	822.1	962.2	962.4	979.92
Sinn Féin	Gerard Foley	12.07%	729	730	730.2	835.2	835.5	879.72
DUP	Kathleen Craig	9.74%	588	631	737.7	755.1	845.5	845.5
SDLP	Bernadette McNamee	8.71%	526	528	529			
PUP	Roy Reid	1.06%	64					
Electorate: 8,282 Valid: 6,038 (72.91%) Spoilt: 113 Quota: 1,007 Turnout: 6,151 (74.27%)

== 2001 election ==
1997: 2 x UUP, 1 x Sinn Féin, 1 x DUP, 1 x SDLP

2001: 2 x Sinn Féin, 1 x UUP, 1 x DUP, 1 x SDLP

1997-2001 change: Sinn Féin gain from UUP

Derg - 5 seats
Party	Candidate	FPv%	Count					
Party	Candidate	FPv%	1	2	3	4	5	6
Sinn Féin	Charles McHugh*	19.57%	1,331					
UUP	Derek Hussey*	16.32%	1,110	1,110.3	1,572.3			
Sinn Féin	Eamonn McGarvey	13.38%	910	962.5	962.5	962.5	1,513.5	
DUP	Thomas Kerrigan*	11.66%	793	793.3	839.45	1,075.45	1,084.05	1,084.05
SDLP	Bernadette McNamee	11.29%	768	785.85	797.85	814.85	903.4	984.4
DUP	Kathleen Allison	9.88%	672	672	709.15	866.15	866.15	866.15
Sinn Féin	Gerard Foley	9.57%	651	773.1	773.1	773.1		
UUP	Edward Turner*	8.31%	565	565.3				
Electorate: 8,455 Valid: 6,800 (80.43%) Spoilt: 132 Quota: 1,134 Turnout: 6,932 (81.99%)

== 1997 election ==
1993: 1 x UUP, 1 x Sinn Féin, 1 x SDLP, 1 x DUP, 1 x Independent Unionist

1997: 2 x UUP, 1 x Sinn Féin, 1 x SDLP, 1 x DUP

1993-1997 change: Independent Unionist joins UUP

Derg - 5 seats
Party	Candidate	FPv%	Count				
Party	Candidate	FPv%	1	2	3	4	5
Sinn Féin	Charles McHugh*	23.32%	1,440				
UUP	Derek Hussey*	20.19%	1,247				
UUP	Edward Turner*	13.57%	838	838.58	988.35	1,047.73	
DUP	Thomas Kerrigan*	9.65%	596	596.29	647.8	1,034.7	
SDLP	Tomás Murtagh	8.91%	550	583.06	584.08	584.08	1,022.08
Sinn Féin	Sean Elliott	8.82%	545	886.62	886.79	887.96	944.53
SDLP	Bernadette McNamee	8.31%	513	543.16	543.84	544.84	
DUP	Sarah Anderson	7.24%	447	447.29	454.94		
Electorate: 8,241 Valid: 6,176 (74.94%) Spoilt: 128 Quota: 1,030 Turnout: 6,304 (76.50%)

== 1993 election ==
1989: 1 x DUP, 1 x Sinn Féin, 1 x SDLP, 1 x UUP, 1 x Independent Unionist

1993: 1 x DUP, 1 x Sinn Féin, 1 x SDLP, 1 x UUP, 1 x Independent Unionist

1989-1993 change: No change

Derg - 5 seats
Party	Candidate	FPv%	Count					
Party	Candidate	FPv%	1	2	3	4	5	6
SDLP	Laurence McNamee*	19.95%	1,131					
UUP	Edward Turner*	18.97%	1,075					
Sinn Féin	Charles McHugh*	17.52%	993					
DUP	Thomas Kerrigan*	15.98%	906	909.74	917.44	965.56		
Ind. Unionist	Derek Hussey*	9.72%	551	556.44	569.54	626.42	636.16	649.16
DUP	Samuel Allison	10.18%	577	579.72	580.4	601.16	610.92	616.92
Sinn Féin	Sean Elliott	6.81%	386	488.68	506.24	506.36		
Ind. Nationalist	Denis McCrory	0.86%	49	117				
Electorate: 7,995 Valid: 5,668 (70.89%) Spoilt: 166 Quota: 945 Turnout: 5,834 (72.97%)

== 1989 election ==
1985: 2 x DUP, 1 x Sinn Féin, 1 x UUP, 1 x Independent Nationalist

1989: 1 x DUP, 1 x Sinn Féin, 1 x UUP, 1 x SDLP, 1 x Independent Unionist

1985-1989 change: SDLP and Independent Unionist gain from DUP and Independent Nationalist

Derg - 5 seats
Party	Candidate	FPv%	Count					
Party	Candidate	FPv%	1	2	3	4	5	6
UUP	Edward Turner*	18.97%	1,050					
DUP	Thomas Kerrigan*	17.52%	970					
Sinn Féin	Charles McHugh*	16.76%	928					
Ind. Unionist	Derek Hussey	14.94%	827	890.48	915.24	915.24	924.8	
SDLP	Laurence McNamee	10.64%	589	589.12	608.24	663.36	663.56	932.56
DUP	Desmond Monteith	7.70%	426	478.8	485.6	486.6	514.72	519.72
Ind. Nationalist	Denis McCrory*	8.00%	443	444.56	454.68	496.68	497	
Sinn Féin	Thomas McNamee*	4.34%	240	240.12	241.12			
Alliance	James Smyth	1.14%	63	69				
Electorate: 7,611 Valid: 5,536 (72.74%) Spoilt: 175 Quota: 923 Turnout: 5,711 (75.04%)

== 1985 election ==
1985: 2 x DUP, 1 x Sinn Féin, 1 x UUP, 1 x Independent Nationalist

Derg - 5 seats
Party	Candidate	FPv%	Count					
Party	Candidate	FPv%	1	2	3	4	5	6
Sinn Féin	Charles McHugh	26.25%	1,534					
UUP	Edward Turner	23.22%	1,357					
DUP	Thomas Kerrigan*	21.74%	1,270					
Ind. Nationalist	Denis McCrory*	8.21%	480	901.88	927.98	930.74	992.35	
DUP	David Baird	4.38%	256	256	441.1	669.95	670.87	680.12
DUP	Noel Finlayson	7.03%	411	411	564	617.36	618.79	630.74
SDLP	James Fitzsimons	5.61%	328	392.13	400.23	402.07	568.99	
SDLP	William Flanagan	3.54%	207	275.9	278.6	280.44		
Electorate: 7,333 Valid: 5,843 (79.68%) Spoilt: 95 Quota: 974 Turnout: 5,938 (80.98%)
