= John Feehan =

Irish geologist, botanist and author

John Anthony Feehan (born 12 May 1946) is an Irish geologist, botanist, author and broadcaster. He was born in Birr, County Offaly, Ireland. Feehan received his early education with the Presentation Brothers in Birr and the Salesian Fathers at Heywood, then studied Natural Sciences at Trinity College Dublin. After a year of voluntary teaching service in South Africa, he returned to Trinity College to study geology under Charles Hepworth Holland, receiving his PhD on the geology of the Slieve Bloom and Devilsbit Mountains in 1980. He was a Senior Lecturer in the School of Agriculture and Food Science at University College Dublin, where he taught for twenty years up to his retirement in 2012. In May 2021, he was made a member of the Royal Irish Academy.

== Career ==
Feehan has written extensively on the natural and cultural heritage of the Irish landscape and on many broader aspects of environmental science. In 1986 and 1990 he wrote and presented the television series Exploring the Landscape and Tar Amach Faoin Aer / Exploring the Celtic Lands, produced by Éamon de Buitléar and directed by Paddy Breathnach, for which he received a Jacob's Television Award in 1988.

Feehan teaches on a range of summer schools, field courses and postgraduate programmes, including the Offaly Naturalists' Field Club and at An Taiseach, the Dominican Ecology Centre in Wicklow.

His major work on Irish agriculture is "Farming in Ireland: History, Heritage and Environment".

Between 1992 and 2008 he collaborated with Bord na Móna on Ireland's peatland heritage. He has developed principles for the restoration of the country's post-extraction peatlands.

He is also an Honorary Life Member of the Cork Geological Association and the County Kildare Archaeological Society.

== Geology and botany ==
His research interests include pollination biology of tropical mistletoes (Loranthaceae) (Feehan, 1985).

== Writing ==
His book on creation spirituality, The Singing Heart of the World (Feehan, 2010), was published in Dublin by Columba Press and in New York by Orbis Books in 2012.

His book Atlas of the Great Irish Famine was named Best Irish Published Book of the Year in 2012.
