= Glenelly (District Electoral Area) =

District electoral areas in Strabane, Northern Ireland

Glenelly DEA (1993-2014) within Strabane

Glenelly was one of the three district electoral areas in Strabane, Northern Ireland which existed from 1985 to 2014. The district elected five members to Strabane District Council, and formed part of the West Tyrone constituencies for the Northern Ireland Assembly and UK Parliament.

It was created for the 1985 local elections, replacing Strabane Area B which had existed since 1973, and contained the wards of Artigarvan, Dunnamanagh, Plumbridge, Slievekirk and Victoria Bridge. It was abolished for the 2014 local elections and replaced with the Sperrin DEA.

== Councillors ==
Election	Councillor (Party)	Councillor (Party)	Councillor (Party)	Councillor (Party)	Councillor (Party)
2011	Dan Kelly (Sinn Féin)	Michelle McMackin (Sinn Féin)	Rhonda Hamilton (DUP)	Allan Bresland (DUP)	John Donnell (DUP)
2005	Tom McBride (SDLP)	Claire McGill (Sinn Féin)	James Emery (UUP)	Allan Bresland (DUP)	John Donnell (DUP)
2001	Tom McBride (SDLP)	Claire McGill (Sinn Féin)	James Emery (UUP)	Allan Bresland (DUP)	John Donnell (DUP)
1997	Tom McBride (SDLP)	Martin Conway (Sinn Féin)	James Emery (UUP)	Allan Bresland (DUP)	John Donnell (DUP)
1993	John Gallagher (SDLP)	Samuel Martin (UUP)	James Emery (UUP)	Allan Bresland (DUP)	John Donnell (DUP)
1989	John Gallagher (SDLP)	Hughes Colhoun (Alliance)	James Emery (UUP)	Samuel Rogers (DUP)	John Donnell (DUP)
1985	John Gallagher (SDLP)	Thomas McNamee (Sinn Féin)	Mary Britton (UUP)	Samuel Rogers (DUP)	Ronald Brolly (DUP)

== 2011 Election ==
2005: 2 x DUP, 1 x Sinn Féin, 1 x UUP, 1 x SDLP

2011: 3 x DUP, 2 x Sinn Féin

2005-2011 Change: DUP and Sinn Féin gain from UUP and SDLP

Glenelly - 5 seats
Party	Candidate	FPv%	Count					
Party	Candidate	FPv%	1	2	3	4	5	6
DUP	Allan Bresland*	28.93%	1,560					
Sinn Féin	Dan Kelly	20.31%	1,095					
DUP	John Donnell*	11.50%	620	1,191.2				
DUP	Rhonda Hamilton	7.46%	402	463.32	738.32	738.32	1,089.32	
Sinn Féin	Michelle McMackin	11.37%	613	613	613	778.24	781.82	785.82
SDLP	Tom McBride*	10.48%	565	566.68	568.22	591.98	650.64	775.64
UUP	Flora Magee	6.18%	333	339.72	347.64	348.36		
UUP	Joe McCormick	3.78%	204	212.82	218.98	219.34		
Electorate: 8,408 Valid: 5,392 (64.13%) Spoilt: 103 Quota: 899 Turnout: 5,495 (65.35%)

== 2005 Election ==
2001: 2 x DUP, 1 x Sinn Féin, 1 x UUP, 1 x SDLP

2005: 2 x DUP, 1 x Sinn Féin, 1 x UUP, 1 x SDLP

2001-2005 Change: No change

Glenelly - 5 seats
Party	Candidate	FPv%	Count			
Party	Candidate	FPv%	1	2	3	4
DUP	Allan Bresland*	26.57%	1,539			
Sinn Féin	Claire McGill*	20.47%	1,186			
DUP	John Donnell*	15.88%	920	1,457.24		
UUP	James Emery*	15.28%	885	908.68	1,359.71	
SDLP	Tom McBride*	14.24%	825	826.11	833.51	1,017.77
Sinn Féin	Thomas O'Neill	7.56%	438	438.37	438.74	438.74
Electorate: 7,882 Valid: 5,793 (73.50%) Spoilt: 83 Quota: 966 Turnout: 5,876 (74.55%)

== 2001 Election ==
1997: 2 x DUP, 1 x Sinn Féin, 1 x UUP, 1 x SDLP

2001: 2 x DUP, 1 x Sinn Féin, 1 x UUP, 1 x SDLP

1997-2001 Change: No change

Glenelly - 5 seats
Party	Candidate	FPv%	Count					
Party	Candidate	FPv%	1	2	3	4	5	6
DUP	Allan Bresland*	20.75%	1,313					
SDLP	Tom McBride*	17.90%	1,133					
DUP	John Donnell*	13.89%	879	1,088.57				
UUP	James Emery*	13.84%	876	887.02	889.54	907.03	1,461.03	
Sinn Féin	Claire McGill	14.84%	939	939	979.59	979.59	980.96	1,002.96
Sinn Féin	Martin Conway*	9.53%	603	603.76	633.82	633.91	635.42	663.42
UUP	Robert Craig	9.24%	585	611.41	615.01	625.96		
Electorate: 7,867 Valid: 6,328 (80.44%) Spoilt: 128 Quota: 1,055 Turnout: 6,456 (82.06%)

== 1997 Election ==
1993: 2 x DUP, 2 x UUP, 1 x SDLP

1997: 2 x DUP, 1 x UUP, 1 x SDLP, 1 x Sinn Féin

1993-1997 Change: Sinn Féin gain from UUP

Glenelly - 5 seats
Party	Candidate	FPv%	Count					
Party	Candidate	FPv%	1	2	3	4	5	6
SDLP	Tom McBride	19.53%	1,155					
Sinn Féin	Martin Conway	19.34%	1,144					
DUP	Allan Bresland*	18.61%	1,101					
UUP	James Emery*	13.84%	1,021					
DUP	John Donnell*	11.45%	677	677.42	680.72	781.82	805.61	822.73
UUP	Wilfred Sinclair	10.41%	616	616.63	617.95	624.75	633.8	708.62
Alliance	Elizabeth McCaffrey	1.47%	87	196.62	281.76	281.76	350.45	
Ind. Nationalist	John Gallagher*	1.93%	114	166.92	230.61	231.91		
Electorate: 7,727 Valid: 5,915 (76.55%) Spoilt: 99 Quota: 986 Turnout: 6,014 (77.83%)

== 1993 Election ==
1989: 2 x DUP, 1 x UUP, 1 x SDLP, 1 x Alliance

1993: 2 x DUP, 2 x UUP, 1 x SDLP

1989-1993 Change: UUP gain from Alliance

Glenelly - 5 seats
Party	Candidate	FPv%	Count						
Party	Candidate	FPv%	1	2	3	4	5	6	7
SDLP	John Gallagher*	18.39%	968						
UUP	James Emery*	16.64%	876	879					
DUP	Allan Bresland	15.67%	825	830	830.5	974.5			
DUP	John Donnell*	14.32%	754	765	765.1	890.1			
UUP	Samuel Martin	8.26%	435	435	435.1	453.1	544.18	546.38	686.45
Sinn Féin	Patrick Kelly	8.83%	465	466	472.5	472.5	472.5	544.1	595.3
Alliance	John Devine	6.97%	367	380	391.9	394	397.96	506.66	
SDLP	Bernard McDermott	4.50%	237	239	308.6	308.6	309.59		
DUP	Derek Reaney	5.68%	299	299	299.2				
Independent	Hughes Colhoun*	0.74%	39						
Electorate: 7,432 Valid: 5,265 (70.84%) Spoilt: 143 Quota: 878 Turnout: 5,408 (72.77%)

== 1989 Election ==
1985: 2 x DUP, 1 x UUP, 1 x SDLP, 1 x Sinn Féin

1989: 2 x DUP, 1 x UUP, 1 x SDLP, 1 x Alliance

1985-1989 Change: Alliance gain from Sinn Féin

Glenelly - 5 seats
Party	Candidate	FPv%	Count					
Party	Candidate	FPv%	1	2	3	4	5	6
UUP	James Emery	26.52%	1,359					
DUP	John Donnell	21.82%	1,118					
SDLP	John Gallagher*	20.20%	1,035					
DUP	Samuel Rogers*	14.38%	737	1,186.54				
Alliance	Hughes Colhoun	2.42%	124	168.46	473.71	684.71	748.18	835.78
Sinn Féin	Martin Forbes	10.27%	526	526.76	527.31	530.31	580.31	671.91
SDLP	Brian Logue	4.39%	225	229.18	253.93	272.93		
Electorate: 7,347 Valid: 5,124 (69.74%) Spoilt: 156 Quota: 855 Turnout: 5,280 (71.87%)

== 1985 Election ==
1985: 2 x DUP, 1 x UUP, 1 x SDLP, 1 x Sinn Féin

Glenelly - 5 seats
Party	Candidate	FPv%	Count				
Party	Candidate	FPv%	1	2	3	4	5
UUP	Mary Britton*	23.56%	1,381				
SDLP	John Gallagher*	17.93%	1,051				
DUP	Samuel Rogers*	16.58%	972	1,164			
DUP	Ronald Brolly	13.56%	795	925.56	1,021.56		
Sinn Féin	Thomas McNamee	13.17%	722	772.96	772.96	773.96	794.2
Ind. Nationalist	Francis McConnell*	10.17%	596	604	606.56	656.36	702.8
DUP	Violet McGerrigle	5.02%	294	359.92	434.48		
Electorate: 7,340 Valid: 5,861 (79.85%) Spoilt: 117 Quota: 977 Turnout: 5,978 (81.44%)
