= Mourne (District Electoral Area) =

District electoral areas in Strabane, Northern Ireland

Mourne DEA (1993-2014) within Strabane

Mourne was one of the three district electoral areas in Strabane, Northern Ireland which existed from 1985 to 2014. The district elected five members to Strabane District Council until 1993, and six members until 2014, and formed part of the West Tyrone constituencies for the Northern Ireland Assembly and UK Parliament.

It was created for the 1985 local elections, replacing Strabane Area C and part of Strabane Area A, and originally contained the wards of East, North, Sion Mills, South and West. For the 1993 local elections, it gained an additional ward, Ballycolman. It was abolished for the 2014 local elections and replaced with the Sperrin DEA, with Sion Mills moving to the Derg DEA.

== Councillors ==
Election	Councillor (Party)	Councillor (Party)	Councillor (Party)	Councillor (Party)	Councillor (Party)	Councillor (Party)
2011	Karina Carlin (Sinn Féin)	Jay McCauley (Sinn Féin)	Brian McMahon (Sinn Féin)	Patsy Kelly (SDLP)	Eugene McMenamin (Independent)/ (SDLP)	James O'Kane (Independent)
2005	Ivan Barr (Sinn Féin)	Jarlath McNulty (Sinn Féin)	Brian McMahon (Sinn Féin)	Daniel Breslin (Sinn Féin)	Eugene McMenamin (Independent)/ (SDLP)	James O'Kane (Independent)
2001	Ivan Barr (Sinn Féin)	Jarlath McNulty (Sinn Féin)	Brian McMahon (Sinn Féin)	Daniel Breslin (Sinn Féin)	Eugene McMenamin (Independent)/ (SDLP)	Ann Bell (SDLP)
1997	Ivan Barr (Sinn Féin)	Jarlath McNulty (Sinn Féin)	James O'Kane (Independent Nationalist)	Thomas Mullen (SDLP)	Eugene McMenamin (Independent)/ (SDLP)	Ann Bell (SDLP)
1993	Ivan Barr (Sinn Féin)	John Cummings (UUP)	James O'Kane (Independent Nationalist)	Thomas Mullen (SDLP)	Mary McElroy (SDLP)	Paul O'Hare (SDLP)
1989	Ivan Barr (Sinn Féin)	John Cummings (UUP)	James O'Kane (Independent Nationalist)	Peggy McManus (Independent Nationalist)/ (SDLP)	Joseph McElroy (SDLP)	5 seats 1985–1993
1985	Ivan Barr (Sinn Féin)	John Cummings (UUP)	James O'Kane (Independent Nationalist)	Peggy McManus (Independent Nationalist)/ (SDLP)	Paul O'Kane (SDLP)	5 seats 1985–1993

== 2011 Election ==
2005: 4 x Sinn Féin, 1 x SDLP, 1 x Independent

2011: 3 x Sinn Féin, 2 x Independent, 1 x SDLP

2005-2011 Change: Independent gain from Sinn Féin

Mourne - 6 seats
Party	Candidate	FPv%	Count							
Party	Candidate	FPv%	1	2	3	4	5	6	7	8
Independent	James O'Kane*	14.13%	859	931						
Sinn Féin	Brian McMahon*	14.07%	855	870						
Independent	Eugene McMenamin*	9.30%	565	624	647	869				
Sinn Féin	Jay McCauley	11.29%	686	698	702	704	1,046			
Sinn Féin	Karina Carlin	11.17%	679	685	690	690	814	987.28		
SDLP	Patsy Kelly	6.50%	395	583	603	664	691	693.85	706.96	707.76
Irish Republican Socialist	Paul Gallagher	10.96%	666	674	678	680	695	695	706.97	707.13
Sinn Féin	Stephen Dunnion	8.62%	524	529	530	531				
UUP	Billy Harpur	7.86%	478	481	481					
SDLP	Eugene Mullen	6.10%	371							
Electorate: 10,602 Valid: 6,078 (57.33%) Spoilt: 142 Quota: 869 Turnout: 6,220 (58.67%)

== 2005 Election ==
2001: 4 x Sinn Féin, 2 x SDLP

2005: 4 x Sinn Féin, 1 x SDLP, 1 x Independent

2001-2005 Change: Independent gain from SDLP

Mourne - 6 seats
Party	Candidate	FPv%	Count						
Party	Candidate	FPv%	1	2	3	4	5	6	7
SDLP	Eugene McMenamin*	17.80%	1,236						
Sinn Féin	Brian McMahon*	15.36%	1,067						
Sinn Féin	Jarlath McNulty*	15.08%	1,047						
Sinn Féin	Ivan Barr*	13.07%	908	926.2	945.03	954.98	969.63	1,019.63	
Independent	James O'Kane	10.61%	737	778.8	783.56	785.71	827.18	901.89	1,007.89
Sinn Féin	Daniel Breslin*	8.15%	566	572.2	616.09	651.99	663.08	723.44	793.24
UUP	Alastair Patterson	9.43%	655	657	657.6	657.65	662.05	664.05	686.25
SDLP	Ann Bell*	3.41%	237	308.8	309.85	310.6	478.97	508.67	
Independent	Paul Gallagher	4.68%	325	329.8	331.55	333.5	339.06		
SDLP	Arthur McGarrigle	2.40%	167	258	260.24	260.99			
Electorate: 10,459 Valid: 6,945 (66.40%) Spoilt: 132 Quota: 993 Turnout: 7,077 (67.66%)

== 2001 Election ==
1997: 3 x SDLP, 2 x Sinn Féin, 1 x Independent Nationalist

2001: 4 x Sinn Féin, 2 x SDLP

1997-2001 Change: Sinn Féin (two seats) gain from SDLP and Independent Nationalist

Mourne - 6 seats
Party	Candidate	FPv%	Count							
Party	Candidate	FPv%	1	2	3	4	5	6	7	8
SDLP	Eugene McMenamin*	18.45%	1,538							
Sinn Féin	Jarlath McNulty*	15.91%	1,326							
Sinn Féin	Ivan Barr*	15.14%	1,262							
Sinn Féin	Brian McMahon	11.72%	977	993.79	1,023.49	1,049.74	1,049.74	1,069.3	1,193.3	
SDLP	Ann Bell*	5.26%	438	565.19	568.79	573.64	575.87	839.76	904.91	1,216.43
Sinn Féin	Daniel Breslin	7.54%	628	634.67	714.27	736.32	736.32	757.16	835.92	951.21
UUP	Sam Martin	5.27%	439	443.14	443.24	443.29	793.75	802.9	806.13	854.89
Independent	James O'Kane*	7.07%	589	637.07	642.87	646.27	671.27	715.04	796.39	
Independent	Paul Gallagher	5.34%	445	456.96	463.36	465.76	465.76	490.02		
SDLP	Fred Henry	3.41%	284	406.82	409.32	411.17	420.17			
DUP	Kathleen Craig	4.90%	408	409.15	409.15	409.2				
Electorate: 10,990 Valid: 8,334 (75.83%) Spoilt: 197 Quota: 1,191 Turnout: 8,531 (77.63%)

== 1997 Election ==
1993: 3 x SDLP, 1 x Sinn Féin, 1 x UUP, 1 x Independent Nationalist

1997: 3 x SDLP, 2 x Sinn Féin, 1 x Independent Nationalist

1993-1997 Change: Sinn Féin gain from UUP

Mourne - 6 seats
Party	Candidate	FPv%	Count					
Party	Candidate	FPv%	1	2	3	4	5	6
Sinn Féin	Ivan Barr*	27.42%	1,959					
Sinn Féin	Jarlath McNulty	17.86%	1,276					
SDLP	Thomas Mullen	15.73%	1,124					
Ind. Nationalist	James O'Kane*	11.21%	801	1,224.28				
SDLP	Eugene McMenamin	10.58%	756	1,091.96				
SDLP	Ann Bell*	4.31%	308	471.54	701.94	740.82	940.57	1,039.9
UUP	John Cummings*	11.55%	825	830.92	842.12	878.86	882.26	882.81
Alliance	Marie Wallace	1.33%	95	98.7	109.1			
Electorate: 10,298 Valid: 7,144 (69.37%) Spoilt: 125 Quota: 1,021 Turnout: 7,269 (70.59%)

== 1993 Election ==
1989: 2 x Independent Nationalist, 1 x SDLP, 1 x Sinn Féin, 1 x UUP

1993: 3 x SDLP, 1 x Sinn Féin, 1 x UUP, 1 x Independent Nationalist

1989-1993 Change: SDLP (two seats) gain from Independent Nationalist and due to the addition of one seat

Mourne - 6 seats
Party	Candidate	FPv%	Count				
Party	Candidate	FPv%	1	2	3	4	5
Sinn Féin	Ivan Barr*	20.76%	1,229				
UUP	John Cummings*	16.27%	963				
SDLP	Mary McElroy	15.63%	925				
Ind. Nationalist	James O'Kane*	14.14%	837	879.24			
SDLP	Thomas Mullen	12.72%	753	813.39	855.39		
SDLP	Paul O'Hare	9.95%	589	610.78	643.75	759.03	831.73
Sinn Féin	Elayne McNicholl	8.24%	488	723.29	737.6	738.48	740.68
Democratic Left	Francis McCay	2.30%	136	150.85			
Electorate: 9,783 Valid: 5,920 (60.51%) Spoilt: 231 Quota: 846 Turnout: 6,151 (62.87%)

== 1989 Election ==
1985: 2 x SDLP, 1 x Sinn Féin, 1 x UUP, 1 x Independent Nationalist

1989: 2 x Independent Nationalist, 1 x SDLP, 1 x Sinn Féin, 1 x UUP

1985-1989 Change: Independent Nationalist leaves SDLP

Mourne - 5 seats
Party	Candidate	FPv%	Count				
Party	Candidate	FPv%	1	2	3	4	5
Sinn Féin	Ivan Barr*	22.70%	1,327				
Ind. Nationalist	Peggy McManus*	19.21%	1,123				
Ind. Nationalist	James O'Kane*	15.03%	879	907.56	978.96		
SDLP	Joseph McElroy	10.96%	641	656.68	688.98	833.27	1,030.27
UUP	John Cummings*	16.23%	949	950.68	952.89	953.34	953.51
Sinn Féin	Ultan McNulty	7.92%	463	750.28	772.04	781.28	795.21
SDLP	Bernard Mullen	4.34%	254	260.16	270.36	305.21	
SDLP	Bernard McDermott	3.61%	211	216.32	224.99		
Electorate: 9,609 Valid: 5,847 (60.85%) Spoilt: 211 Quota: 975 Turnout: 6,058 (63.05%)

== 1985 Election ==
1985: 2 x SDLP, 1 x Sinn Féin, 1 x UUP, 1 x Independent Nationalist

Mourne - 5 seats
Party	Candidate	FPv%	Count					
Party	Candidate	FPv%	1	2	3	4	5	6
Sinn Féin	Ivan Barr	27.90%	1,581					
Ind. Nationalist	James O'Kane*	22.06%	1,250					
SDLP	Paul O'Hare*	13.36%	757	1,090.7				
SDLP	Peggy McManus	10.38%	588	745.62	921.3	1,005.79		
UUP	John Cummings	10.15%	575	582.81	591.81	593.23	593.23	1,088.95
SDLP	Mary McCrea*	6.85%	388	512.25	628.17	680	735.38	747.59
DUP	Desmond Monteith	9.30%	527	531.26	534.5	535.21	535.92	
Electorate: 8,536 Valid: 5,666 (66.38%) Spoilt: 130 Quota: 945 Turnout: 5,796 (67.90%)
