= Claire McGill =

Irish politician

Member of the Northern Ireland Assembly for West Tyrone
- In office 7 March 2007 – 5 May 2011
- Preceded by: Eugene McMenamin
- Succeeded by: Michaela Boyle

Member of Strabane District Council
- In office 7 June 2001 – 5 May 2011
- Preceded by: Martin Conway
- Succeeded by: Michelle McMakin
- Constituency: Glenelly

Personal details
- Born: County Tyrone, Northern Ireland
- Died: 15 June 2023 Derry, Northern Ireland
- Party: Sinn Féin
- Website: Claire McGill MLA

Claire McGill MLA was a nationalist politician in Northern Ireland. She sat in the Northern Ireland Assembly from 2007 to 2011, representing West Tyrone as a member of Sinn Féin.

McGill also represented Sinn Féin for the Glenelly Electoral Area on Strabane District Council from 2001 to 2011.

She died on 15 June 2023 at Altnagelvin Area Hospital.

Northern Ireland Assembly
Preceded by Eugene McMenamin	MLA for West Tyrone; 2007–2011	Succeeded by Michaela Boyle
