= Eugene McMenamin =

Member of Strabane District Council
- In office 21 May 1997 – 22 May 2014
- Preceded by: Mary McElroy
- Succeeded by: Council abolished
- Constituency: Mourne

Member of the Northern Ireland Assembly for West Tyrone
- In office 25 June 1998 – 7 March 2007
- Preceded by: New Creation
- Succeeded by: Claire McGill

Personal details
- Born: 1947 (age 78–79) Strabane, Northern Ireland
- Party: Independent (2011 - present)
- Other political affiliations: SDLP (until 2011)

Eugene McMenamin (1947), is an Irish nationalist former politician from Northern Ireland, who was a Social Democratic and Labour Party (SDLP) Member of the Legislative Assembly (MLA) for West Tyrone from 1998 to 2007.

== Career ==
In June 1998 he was elected to the Northern Ireland Assembly as the first nationalist to be in government from Strabane in over 300 years. McMenamin was his party's spokesperson on Culture, Arts and Leisure from 1998 until 2003 and was in approx 2007 the Party Spokesperson on Western Development.

After being elected as Chairman of Strabane District Council in 2002, he was re-elected to the Assembly in November 2003 but lost his seat in 2007.

In the Northern Ireland Assembly, McMenamin served on numerous Committees:

- Committee on Enterprise, Trade and Investment;
- Committee of the Centre
- Committee on Culture, Arts and Leisure.
- Committee of the Third World.

He stood as an independent candidate for West Tyrone in the Northern Ireland Assembly elections in 2011, but was not elected.

Northern Ireland Assembly
New assembly	MLA for West Tyrone; 1998–2007	Succeeded by Claire McGill
