= Artigarvan =

Coordinates: 54°51′N 7°24′W

Artigarvan: Irish: Ard Tí Garbháin; Scots: Airtigarvan
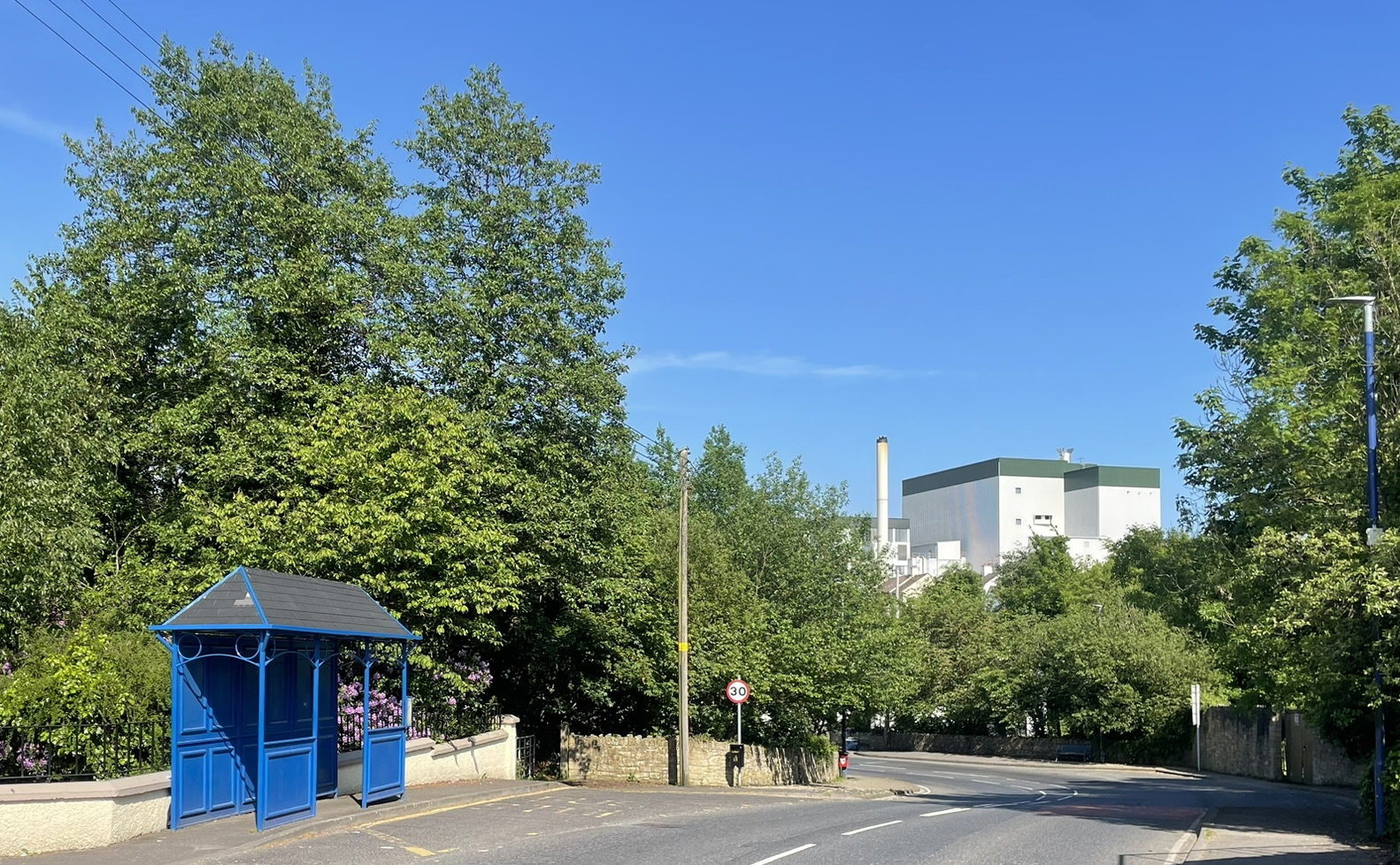
- Malison Bridge in the centre of Artigarvan, with Leckpatrick creamery in the background.
- Population: 802
- District: Derry City and Strabane (2015-present); Strabane (1973-2015)
- County: County Tyrone
- Country: Northern Ireland
- Sovereign state: United Kingdom
- Post town: STRABANE
- Postcode district: BT82
- Dialling code: 028, +44 28
- Police: Northern Ireland
- Fire: Northern Ireland
- Ambulance: Northern Ireland
- UK Parliament: West Tyrone (since 1997) Mid Ulster (1950-97)
- NI Assembly: West Tyrone (since 1996) Mid Ulster (1950-96)

Artigarvan (from Irish: Ard Tí Garbháin, meaning "height of Garbhan's house"; Ulster-Scots: Airtigarvan) is a village and townland in County Tyrone, Northern Ireland.

Artigarvan had a population of 802 at the 2021 census. It is 3 miles from Strabane and 4 miles from Donemana.

== Geography ==
=== Physical geography ===
Artigarvan is sited near a confluence between a small burn and the Glenmornan River, towards the far end of the Glenmornan valley (part of the wider Foyle Valley complex). A disused mill, which was once powered by the river, is located nearby.

Artigarvan is centrally sited in the valley's alluvial plain - an area of relatively flat land, suitable for pasture.

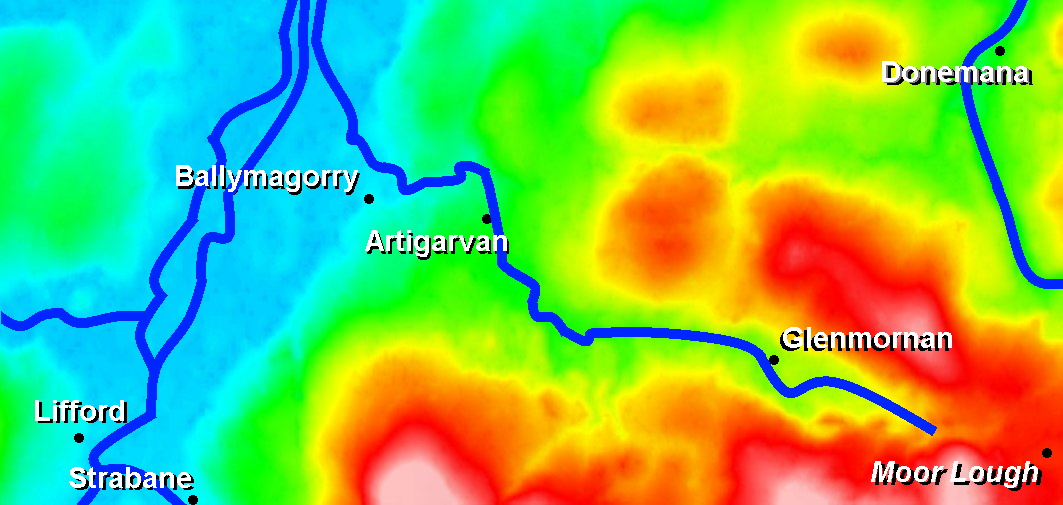
A relief map of Artigarvan and the surrounding area within the Glenmornan valley.

The northern and western boundaries of Artigarvan townland follow the river. Along these boundaries, the river is spanned by:

- Malison Bridge, in the centre of the village (on Berryhill Road)
- Catherine's Bridge, to the south (on Sentry Road)
- Maccracken's Bridge, to the north (on Station Road)

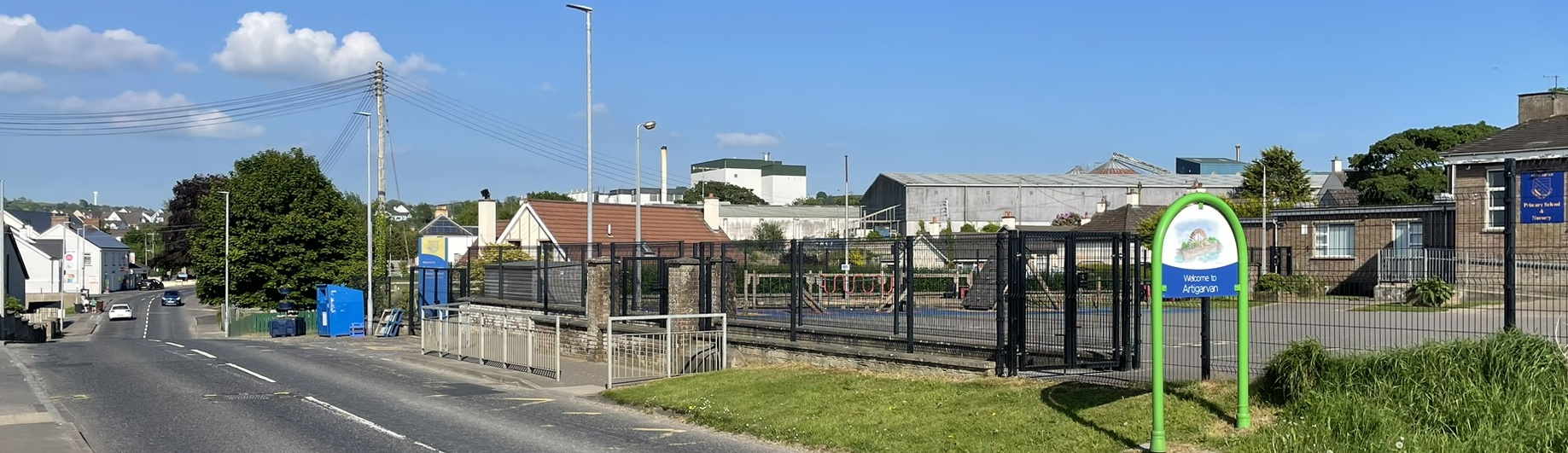
Artigarvan from the west. Visible landmarks include the Spar shop, Leckpatrick creamery, Strabane Mills and Artigarvan Primary School.

=== Historical and political boundaries ===
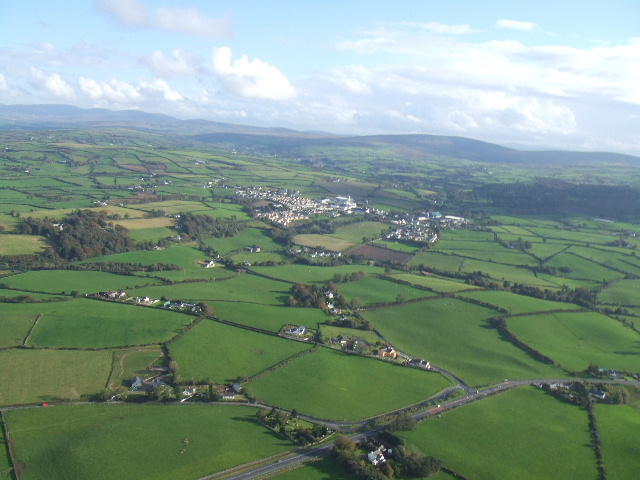
An aerial view of Artigarvan.

The Artigarvan townland covers an area of 174 acres. However, the wider village is spread across the townlands of Artigarvan, Milltown, Glebe and Liscurry. All are located within the historic barony of Strabane Lower and the civil parish of Leckpatrick.

The village was previously part of the Artigarvan ward in Glenelly DEA in Strabane District Council from 1985 until 2015 (and before that, it formed part of Strabane Area B from 1973 to 1985). During this time, Artigarvan ward included the village itself, Ballymagorry, Cloghcor and Glenmornan.

Since local government reforms in 2015, the village has sat within the Artigarvan ward in Sperrin DEA, part of Derry City and Strabane District Council. The only change in the Artigarvan ward was the addition of the Woodend area at the far north of Strabane town.

== Demography ==
=== 19th century ===
The population of the townland declined during the 19th century:

Year	1841	1851	1861	1871	1881	1891
Population	127	110	93	97	67	54
Houses	26	23	20	19	14	17

=== Religion and belief ===
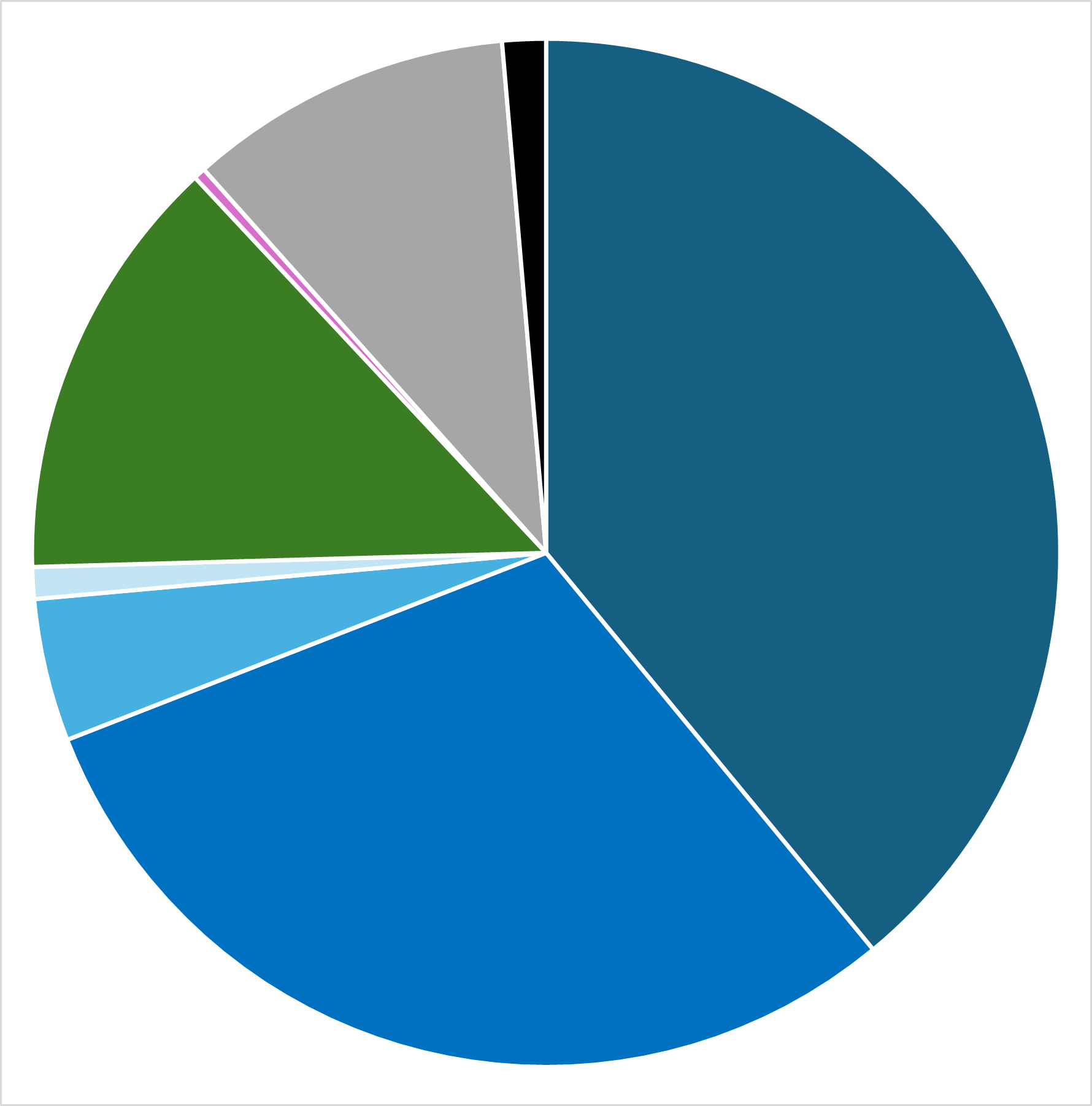
Religion in Artigarvan, 2021 census, clockwise from top: Presbyterian, Church of Ireland, other Christian, Methodist, Catholic, 'other religion', no religion, not stated

In the 2021 census, the population of Artigarvan village itself was 802. Religion and belief in the village for past censuses is as follows:

Religion or belief	2021			2011			2001		
Religion or belief	No.	%	+/-	No.	%	+/-	No.	%	+/-
Protestant/'other Christian'	598	74.56%	-9.55%	614	84.11%	-2.58%	521	86.69%	
Presbyterian	313	39.03%	-6.45%	332	45.48%	-5.44%	306	50.92%	
Church of Ireland	241	30.05%	-2.14%	235	32.19%	-0.26%	195	32.45%	
Methodist	8	1.00%	+0.32%	5	0.68%	+0.68%	0	0.00%	
Other Christian or Christian related	36	4.49%	-1.26%	42	5.75%	+2.42%	20	3.33%	
Catholic	108	13.47%	+4.02%	69	9.45%	+3.46%	36	5.99%	
No religion	82	10.22%	+6.52%	27	3.70%	-1.57%	44	7.32%	
Not stated	11	1.37%	-0.68%	15	2.05%	-1.57%	44	7.32%	
Other religion	3	0.37%	-0.31%	5	0.68%	+0.68%	0	0.00%	
Total	802	100.00%	+9.86%	730	100%	+21.46%	601	100%	

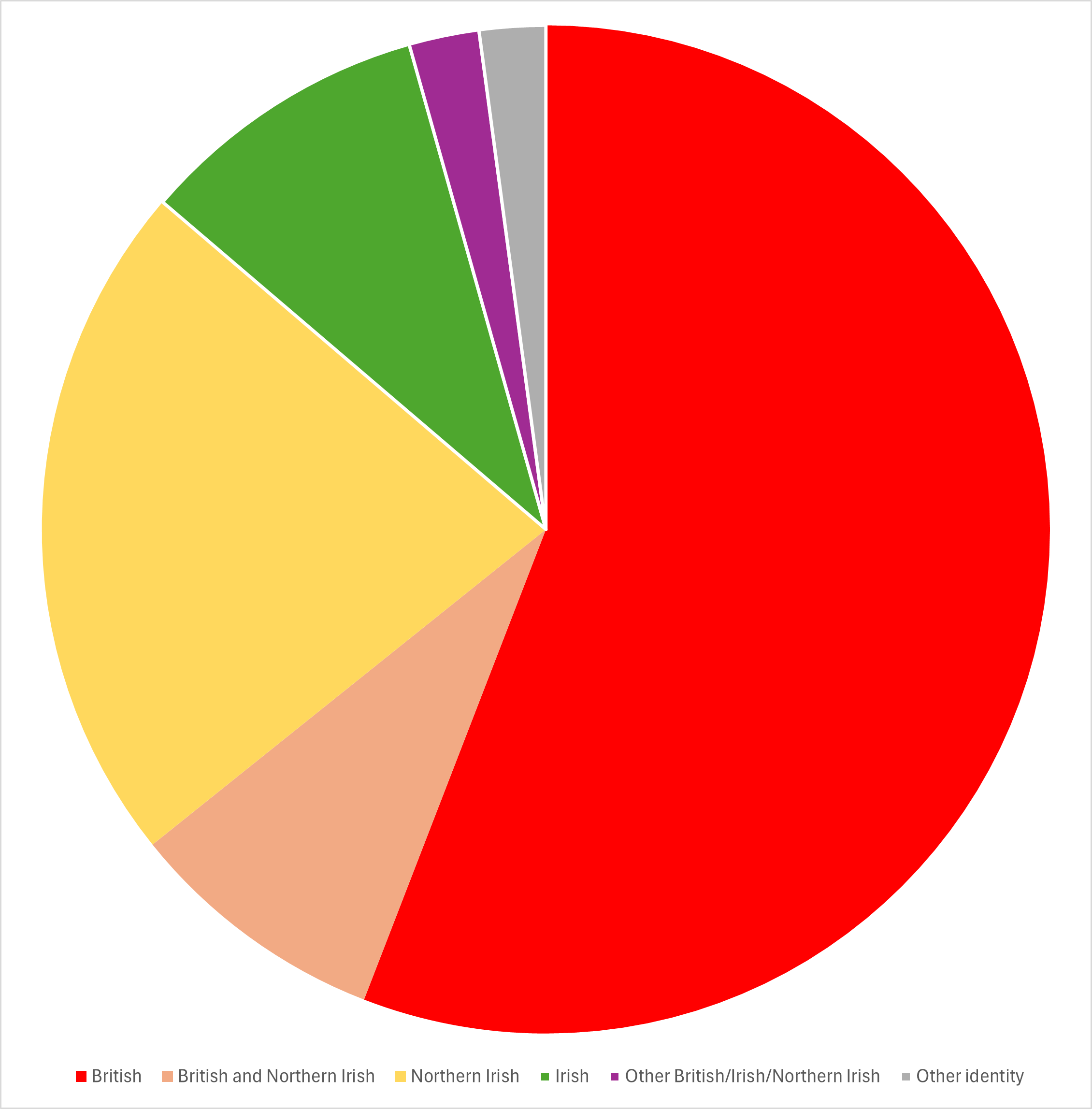
National identity in Artigarvan, based on the 2021 census. Clockwise from top: British, British and Northern Irish, Northern Irish, Irish, other combination of British/Irish/Northern Irish, other national identity.

=== 2021 census ===
In terms of national identity, people in Artigarvan gave the following answers. Of 800 people:

- 447 stated their national identity as British only (55.88%)
- 176 stated their national identity as Northern Irish only (22.00%)
- 75 stated their national identity as Irish only (9.38%)
- 67 stated their national identity as British and Northern Irish only (8.38%)
- 18 asserted various other combinations of British, Irish and Northern Irish national identity (2.25%)
- 17 gave other answers for their national identity (2.13%)

In terms of ethnicity, people in Artigarvan gave the following responses. Of 801 people:

- 798 stated their ethnicity as white (99.63%)
- 3 individuals stated their ethnicity as Indian, 'other Asian' and mixed respectively (0.12% each)

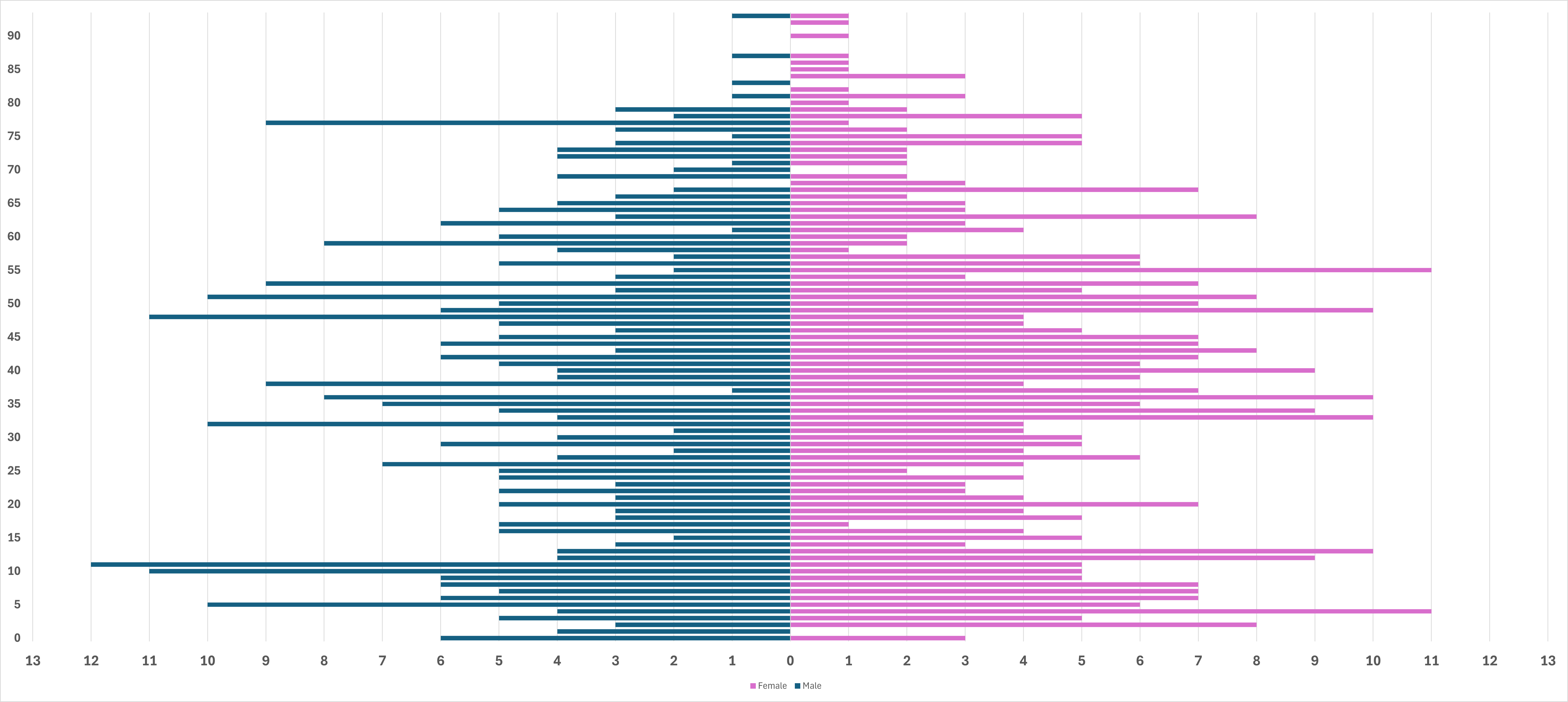
A chart showing the age and sex of Artigarvan's population, based on the 2021 census.

In terms of age, people in Artigarvan gave the following responses. Of 802 people:

- 180 were aged 0-14 years (22.44%)
- 246 were aged 15-39 years (30.67%)
- 271 were aged 40-64 years (33.79%)
- 105 were aged 65 years or older (13.09%)

=== Artigarvan ward ===
In the 2011 census, the population of Artigarvan ward (the area including Ballymagorry, Glenmornan and Cloghcor) was 2,760.

- 99.09% were from the white ethnic group;
- 51.05% belong to or were brought up in a 'Protestant and Other Christian (including Christian related) religion and 46.96% belong to or were brought up in the Catholic religion.
- 46.99% indicated that they had a British national identity, 29.20% had an Irish national identity, and 31.09% had a Northern Irish national identity.

== Economy ==
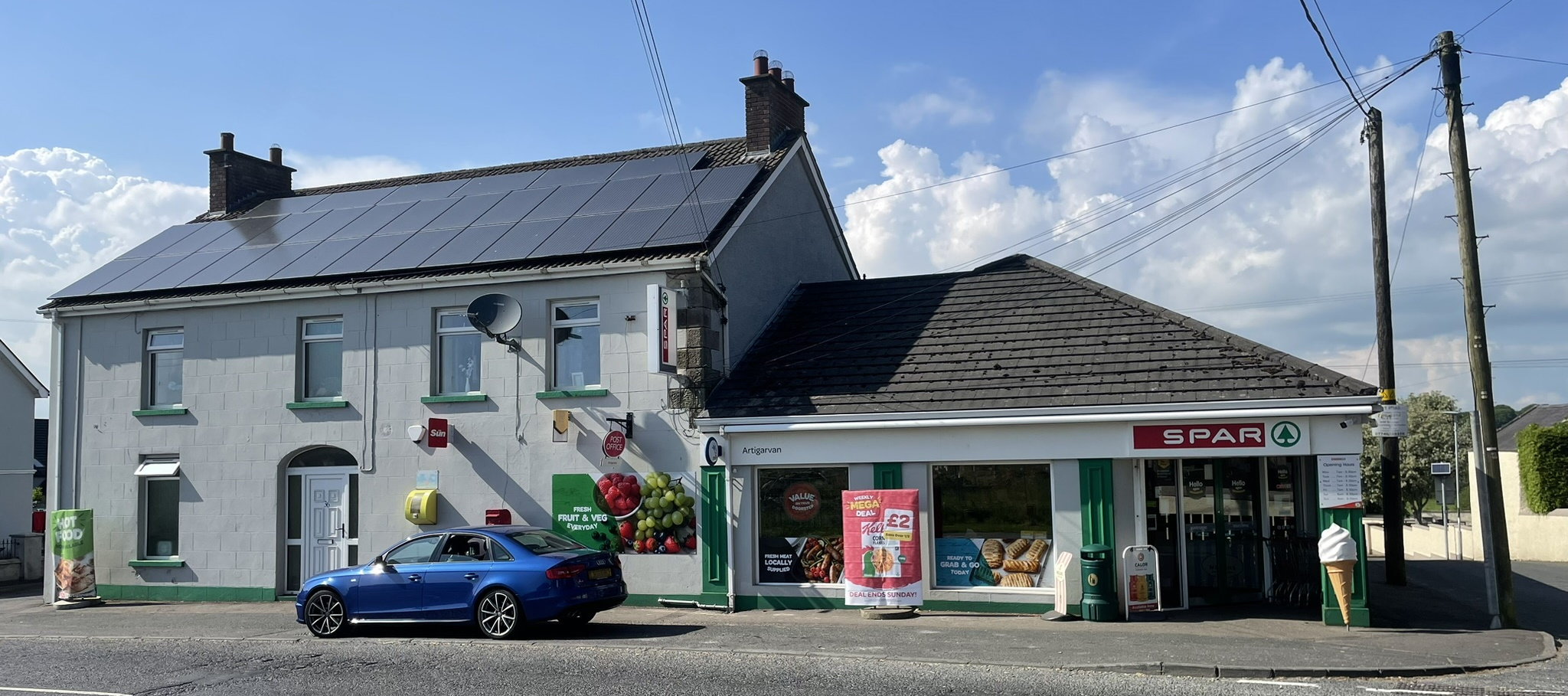
The Spar shop in Artigarvan.

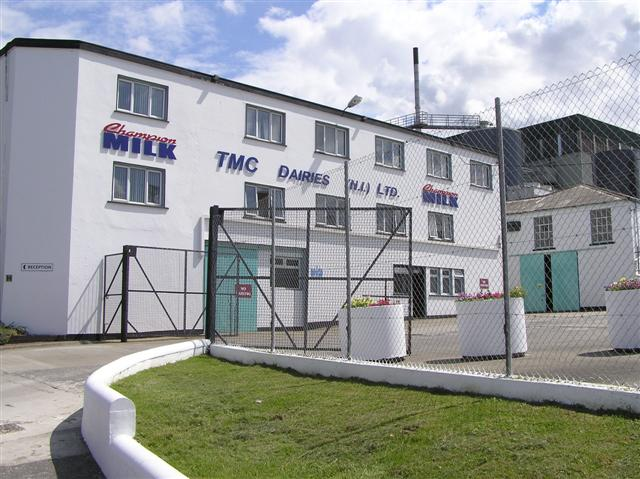
Leckpatrick creamery in 2006, at the time branded as TMC Dairies.

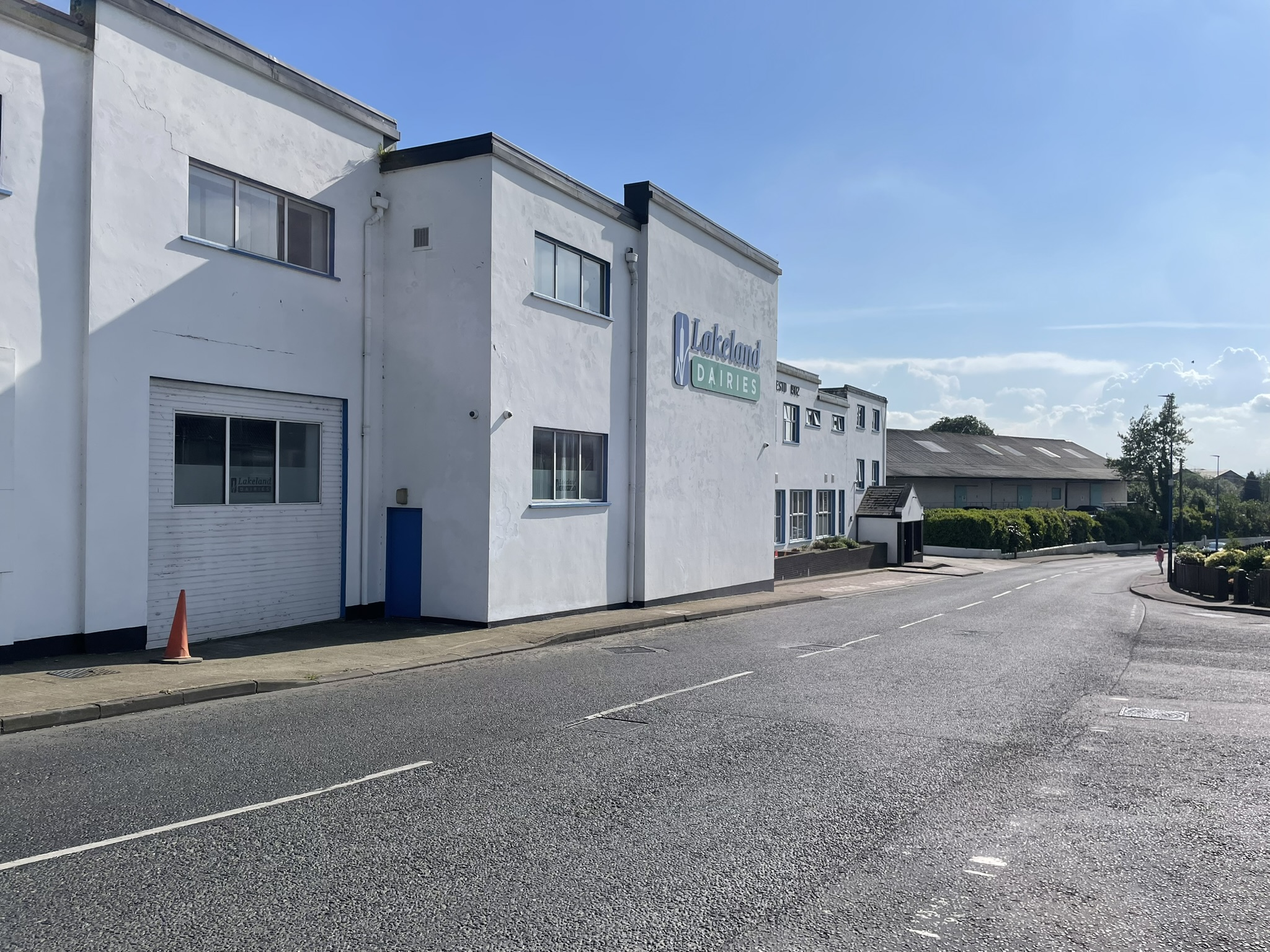
Leckpatrick creamery in Artigarvan in 2024, branded as Lakeland Dairies, viewed from Berryhill Road.

Artigarvan is served by a Spar convenience store, run by former financial advisor John Allen, and Gary King. Another shop is Holden Agri and Fuels, a family-owned agricultural merchant which operates a small set of fuel pumps. The nearest full-size covered forecourt is available at the Centra shop in neighbouring Ballymagorry.

In the past, Artigarvan boasted industries such as a cornmill, a paper mill and a spade factory, all powered by the Glenmornan River. One of the waterwheels was regarded as among the largest in Ireland, measuring 20 feet, according to librarian and writer Cathal Coyle.

In modern times, the industry in the village comprises Strabane Mills Ltd, which is a producer of animal feeds, and the Leckpatrick creamery, currently operated by Lakeland Dairies. A sign on the outside of the creamery reads "ESTD 1902". The creamery has gone through numerous changes in ownership and brand, which are outlined below.

Year	Owner	Notes
1902		Creamery established, according to the sign on the outside.
1989	Leckpatrick Holdings Ltd	Previously known as Dairy Holdings Ltd until 1990.
1993	Golden Vale plc	Acquired Leckpatrick Holdings.
2001	Kerry Group plc	Acquired Golden Vale.
2002	Town of Monaghan Co-Op Ltd	Purchased creamery from Kerry Group.
2015	LacPatrick Dairies (NI) Ltd	Merger of Town of Monaghan Co-Op and Ballyrashane Creamery.
2019	Lakeland Dairies Group	Acquired LacPatrick Dairies following regulatory approval.

== Education ==
The sole school in the village is Artigarvan Primary School, a controlled school. The other nearby primary schools include controlled schools such as Donemana Primary School and Strabane Controlled Primary School; Catholic-maintained schools such as St. Joseph's Glenmornan Primary School, St. Michael's Primary School in Donemana, and St. Mary's Primary School in Cloghcor; and the Irish-medium school Gaelscoil Uí Dhochartaigh.

Local preschools include Artigarvan Primary School's community nursery, and the Woodlands Preschool Centre at Donemana Primary School.

The nearest post-primary school is Strabane Academy, formed by the amalgamation of Strabane Grammar School and Strabane High School in 2011. The amalgamated school continued functioning across the two separate sites of the old schools until a new build was completed in 2020. Strabane Academy allows admission both via a selective stream and a non-selective stream. The other nearby post-primary school is the Catholic-maintained secondary school Holy Cross College.

The nearest special school is Knockavoe School.

== Politics ==
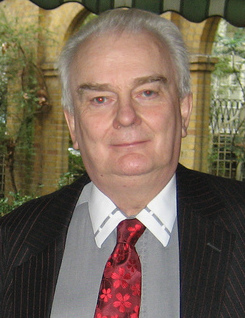
Lord Laird of Artigarvan, who used the name of the village in his title.

The Derry and Strabane council district, in which Artigarvan lies.

The West Tyrone Parliamentary and Assembly constituency, in which Artigarvan lies.

Since 1996, Artigarvan has formed part of the West Tyrone constituency for Parliamentary elections, with this constituency also used for the Assembly and other devolved bodies. In Parliament, West Tyrone has been represented by the abstentionist Sinn Féin since 2001, and in devolved elections Sinn Féin has been the largest party since the 1998 Assembly election, currently holding three out of the five Assembly seats in West Tyrone.

John Laird chose the name of the village to be in his title (Lord Laird of Artigarvan) when he became a life peer in the House of Lords. Laird chose this in honour of his mother, Margaret, who is originally from the village.

=== Local government ===
In local government, Artigarvan has been part of Derry City and Strabane District Council since it succeeded Strabane District Council in 2015. Artigarvan sits within Sperrin DEA, having previously been part of Glenelly DEA from 1985-2015, and before that Strabane Area B from 1973-1985. Councillors for Sperrin DEA were first elected in 2014 and sat as part of a shadow council until the new Derry and Strabane authority formally took over in 2015.

Historically, Strabane Area B and Glenelly DEA were unionist-dominated - in these areas, the UUP was the largest party from 1973-1981, followed by the DUP from 1981 onwards. In fact, in 1993, 4 of the 5 councillors were unionist, with nationalists represented only by a single SDLP councillor. These DEAs comprised the Glenelly Valley and environs, including the predominantly-unionist villages of Artigarvan and Donemana.

However, the creation of the Sperrin DEA saw most of the Glenelly DEA merged with most of Strabane town, which had previously been part of the Mourne DEA. While Glenelly had a unionist majority, Mourne had been represented solely by nationalist councillors since 1997, and had a Sinn Féin majority since 2001.

As a result, since the first election to the Sperrin DEA in 2014, Artigarvan has been represented primarily by Sinn Féin councillors. The election that year saw Sinn Féin win 3 of the 7 seats and become the largest party in the new Sperrin DEA. Despite losing one of their Sperrin seats to an independent republican in 2019, Sinn Féin gained a third seat again in 2023, at the expense of DUP ex-MLA Maurice Devenney, leaving Artigarvan represented by only one unionist councillor for the first time, with nationalists holding six of the seven seats in Sperrin.

Since 1973, Artigarvan has been represented by the following councillors:

Election	Councillor (Party)	Councillor (Party)	Councillor (Party)	Councillor (Party)	Councillor (Party)	Councillor (Party)	Councillor (Party)
Sperrin DEA (2014-present)
April 2024 defection	Paul Boggs (Sinn Féin)	Brian Harte (Sinn Féin)	Fergal Leonard (Sinn Féin)	Gary Wilkinson (DUP)	Jason Barr (SDLP)/(Independent)	Raymond Barr (Independent)	Paul Gallagher (Independent)
October 2023 co-option	Paul Boggs (Sinn Féin)	Brian Harte (Sinn Féin)	Fergal Leonard (Sinn Féin)	Gary Wilkinson (DUP)	Jason Barr (SDLP)/(Independent)	Raymond Barr (Independent)	Paul Gallagher (Independent)
2023	Paul Boggs (Sinn Féin)	Brian Harte (Sinn Féin)	Fergal Leonard (Sinn Féin)	Allan Bresland (DUP)	Jason Barr (SDLP)/(Independent)	Raymond Barr (Independent)	Paul Gallagher (Independent)
2019	Dan Kelly (Sinn Féin)	Michaela Boyle (Sinn Féin)	Maurice Devenney (DUP)	Allan Bresland (DUP)	Jason Barr (SDLP)/(Independent)	Raymond Barr (Independent)	Paul Gallagher (Independent)
April 2016 defection	Dan Kelly (Sinn Féin)	Brian McMahon (Sinn Féin)	Rhonda Hamilton (DUP)	Allan Bresland (DUP)	Patsy Kelly (SDLP)/(Independent)	Karina Carlin (Sinn Féin)	Paul Gallagher (Independent)
2014	Dan Kelly (Sinn Féin)	Brian McMahon (Sinn Féin)	Rhonda Hamilton (DUP)	Allan Bresland (DUP)	Patsy Kelly (SDLP)/(Independent)	Karina Carlin (Sinn Féin)	Paul Gallagher (Independent)
Glenelly DEA (1985-2014)						5 seats (1973-2014)	
2011	Dan Kelly (Sinn Féin)	Michelle McMackin (Sinn Féin)	Rhonda Hamilton (DUP)	Allan Bresland (DUP)	John Donnell (DUP)	5 seats (1973-2014)	
2005	Tom McBride (SDLP)	Claire McGill (Sinn Féin)	James Emery (UUP)	Allan Bresland (DUP)	John Donnell (DUP)	5 seats (1973-2014)	
2001	Tom McBride (SDLP)	Claire McGill (Sinn Féin)	James Emery (UUP)	Allan Bresland (DUP)	John Donnell (DUP)	5 seats (1973-2014)	
1997	Tom McBride (SDLP)	Martin Conway (Sinn Féin)	James Emery (UUP)	Allan Bresland (DUP)	John Donnell (DUP)	5 seats (1973-2014)	
1993	John Gallagher (SDLP)	Samuel Martin (UUP)	James Emery (UUP)	Allan Bresland (DUP)	John Donnell (DUP)	5 seats (1973-2014)	
1989	John Gallagher (SDLP)	Hughes Colhoun (Alliance)	James Emery (UUP)	Samuel Rogers (DUP)	John Donnell (DUP)	5 seats (1973-2014)	
1985	John Gallagher (SDLP)	Thomas McNamee (Sinn Féin)	Mary Britton (UUP)	Samuel Rogers (DUP)	Ronald Brolly (DUP)	5 seats (1973-2014)	
Strabane Area B (1973-1985)						5 seats (1973-2014)	
1981	John Gallagher (SDLP)	Francis McConnell (Independent Nationalist)	Mary Britton (UUP)	Samuel Rogers (DUP)/ (United Loyalist Coalition)	George McIntyre (DUP)	5 seats (1973-2014)	
1977	John Gallagher (SDLP)	Francis McConnell (Independent Nationalist)	Mary Britton (UUP)	Samuel Rogers (DUP)/ (United Loyalist Coalition)	Henry Henderson (UUP)	5 seats (1973-2014)	
1973	Seamus Kearney (SDLP)	Tom Gormley (Alliance)	Mary Britton (UUP)	Samuel Rogers (DUP)/ (United Loyalist Coalition)	Henry Henderson (UUP)	5 seats (1973-2014)	

== See also ==
- List of townlands of County Tyrone
