= Donemana =

Village in County Tyrone, Northern Ireland

Coordinates: 54.874°N 7.308°W

Donemana: Irish: Dún na Manach; Donemana
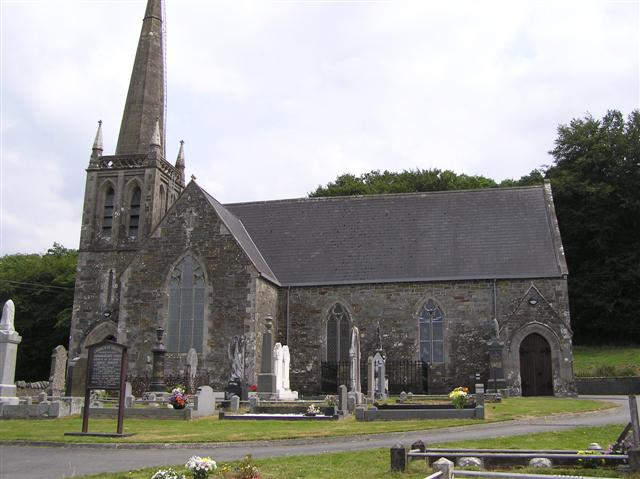
- Donaghedy Parish Church

- Location within Northern Ireland
- Population: 586
- District: Derry and Strabane
- County: County Tyrone
- Country: Northern Ireland
- Sovereign state: United Kingdom
- Post town: STRABANE
- Postcode district: BT82
- Dialling code: 028, +44 28
- Police: Northern Ireland
- Fire: Northern Ireland
- Ambulance: Northern Ireland
- UK Parliament: West Tyrone
- NI Assembly: West Tyrone

Donemana (named after the townland of Dunnamanagh, from Irish Dún na Manach 'stronghold of the monks') is a village in County Tyrone, Northern Ireland. It is 7 miles or 11 kilometres north-east of Strabane, on the banks of the Burn Dennett and at the foothills of the Sperrins. In 2001, it was the largest of the thirteen villages in the former Strabane District Council area and it had a population of 586 in the Census that year.

Other anglicised spellings of its name include Dun[n]amana[gh] and Don[n]amana[gh].

== History ==
The village was established in the early 17th century as part of the Plantation of Ulster, instigated by James I in 1609. Land in the area was granted to John Drummond who established the village; building a bawn (an enclosed, fortified farmyard, designed as a place of refuge for settlers in case of attack), 10 wicker-work houses, and a watermill for grinding corn.

== Transport ==
The two main roads running through Donemana are the B49, which runs from Strabane through Donemana to Claudy (near the A6 dual carriageway between Derry and Belfast); and the B48, which runs from Derry to Omagh through the countryside (via Newbuildings, Plumbridge and Gortin). This serves as an alternative to the A5 road that forms the northern part of the route from Derry to Dublin.

Translink's Ulsterbus serves Donemana solely via its 102 route, which runs between Derry and Strabane, stopping in Prehen, Newbuildings, Donemana, Artigarvan and Glenmornan.

Donemana railway station was part of the County Donegal Railway and opened on 6 August 1900, but this was shut on 1 January 1955. The All-Island Strategic Rail Review published in 2023 did not contain any commitment to reviving this line.

== Education ==
It has two primary schools, Donemana County Primary School and St. Michael's Primary School. Local children generally attend secondary school in Strabane or Derry.

== Sport ==
Donemana has been called a "cricket-mad village" whose local cricket team was "the first team in more than 100 years to win four successive Senior Cup finals."

Football and Gaelic football is also popular in the area. Clann na nGael is the local GAA club.

== Notable people ==
Notable people who were born or have lived in Donemana include:

- George Fletcher Moore, 19th century writer, barrister and explorer
- Allan Bresland, politician
- William Porterfield, Irish cricketer
- Andrew McBrine, Irish cricketer
- Stephen O'Neill, Tyrone All-Ireland-winning GAA
- Brian Dooher, Tyrone All-Ireland-winning GAA captain

== Demography ==
=== 19th century population ===
The population of the village increased during the 19th century:

Year	1841	1851	1861	1871	1881	1891
Population	176	193	247	231	243	231
Houses	44	40	50	53	52	58

The village stands in the townlands of Dunnamanagh and Stonyfalls, and in 1891, had an estimated area of 11 acres.

=== 21st century population ===
Donemana is classified as a small village or hamlet by the Northern Ireland Statistics and Research Agency (NISRA) (i.e. with population between 500 and 1,000). On Census day (27 March 2011) there were 586 people living in Donemana. Of these:

- 23.21% were aged under 16 and 13.14% were aged 65 and over
- 48.46% of the population were male and 51.54% were female
- 15.19% were from a Catholic background and 83.79% were from a Protestant background
- 7.8% of people aged 16–74 were unemployed.

== Dunnamanagh Townland ==
The townland is situated in the historic barony of Strabane Lower and the civil parish of Donaghedy and covers an area of 130 acres.

The population of the townland increased overall during the 19th century:

Year	1841	1851	1861	1871	1881	1891
Population	65	71	66	32	34	72
Houses	13	10	11	7	8	9

== Politics ==
The West Tyrone Parliamentary and Assembly constituency, in which Donemana lies.

The Derry and Strabane council district, in which Donemana lies.

Since 1996, Donemana has formed part of the West Tyrone constituency for Parliamentary elections, with this constituency also used for the Assembly and other devolved bodies. In Parliament, West Tyrone has been represented by the abstentionist Sinn Féin since 2001, and in devolved elections Sinn Féin has been the largest party since the 1998 Assembly election, currently holding three out of the five Assembly seats in West Tyrone.

=== Local government ===
In local government, Donemana has been part of Derry City and Strabane District Council since it succeeded Strabane District Council in 2015. Donemana sits within Sperrin DEA, having previously been part of Glenelly DEA from 1985 to 2015, and before that Strabane Area B from 1973 to 1985. Councillors for Sperrin DEA were first elected in 2014 and sat as part of a shadow council until the new Derry and Strabane authority formally took over in 2015.

Historically, Strabane Area B and Glenelly DEA were unionist-dominated - in these areas, the UUP was the largest party from 1973-1981, followed by the DUP from 1981 onwards. In fact, in 1993, 4 of the 5 councillors were unionist, with nationalists represented only by a single SDLP councillor. These DEAs comprised the Glenelly Valley and environs, including the predominantly-unionist villages of Artigarvan and Donemana.

However, the creation of the Sperrin DEA saw most of the Glenelly DEA merged with most of Strabane town, which had previously been part of the Mourne DEA. While Glenelly had a unionist majority, Mourne had been represented solely by nationalist councillors since 1997, and had a Sinn Féin majority since 2001.

As a result, since the first election to the Sperrin DEA in 2014, Donemana has been represented primarily by Sinn Féin councillors. The election that year saw Sinn Féin win 3 of the 7 seats and become the largest party in the new Sperrin DEA. Despite losing one of their Sperrin seats to an independent republican in 2019, Sinn Féin gained a third seat again in 2023, at the expense of DUP ex-MLA Maurice Devenney, leaving Donemana represented by only one unionist councillor for the first time, with nationalists holding six of the seven seats in Sperrin.

Councillors for Donemana that have actually been from the village itself include Allan Bresland, who served as a DUP councillor from 1993 to 2023 and as a DUP MLA from 2007 to 2011; his successor Gary Wilkinson, who was co-opted by the DUP in 2023; and Hughes Colhoun, who was elected as an Alliance councillor in 1989, serving until 1993.

Since 1973, Donemana has been represented by the following councillors:

Election	Councillor (Party)	Councillor (Party)	Councillor (Party)	Councillor (Party)	Councillor (Party)	Councillor (Party)	Councillor (Party)
Sperrin DEA (2014-present)
April 2024 defection	Paul Boggs (Sinn Féin)	Brian Harte (Sinn Féin)	Fergal Leonard (Sinn Féin)	Gary Wilkinson (DUP)	Jason Barr (SDLP)/(Independent)	Raymond Barr (Independent)	Paul Gallagher (Independent)
October 2023 co-option	Paul Boggs (Sinn Féin)	Brian Harte (Sinn Féin)	Fergal Leonard (Sinn Féin)	Gary Wilkinson (DUP)	Jason Barr (SDLP)/(Independent)	Raymond Barr (Independent)	Paul Gallagher (Independent)
2023	Paul Boggs (Sinn Féin)	Brian Harte (Sinn Féin)	Fergal Leonard (Sinn Féin)	Allan Bresland (DUP)	Jason Barr (SDLP)/(Independent)	Raymond Barr (Independent)	Paul Gallagher (Independent)
2019	Dan Kelly (Sinn Féin)	Michaela Boyle (Sinn Féin)	Maurice Devenney (DUP)	Allan Bresland (DUP)	Jason Barr (SDLP)/(Independent)	Raymond Barr (Independent)	Paul Gallagher (Independent)
April 2016 defection	Dan Kelly (Sinn Féin)	Brian McMahon (Sinn Féin)	Rhonda Hamilton (DUP)	Allan Bresland (DUP)	Patsy Kelly (SDLP)/(Independent)	Karina Carlin (Sinn Féin)	Paul Gallagher (Independent)
2014	Dan Kelly (Sinn Féin)	Brian McMahon (Sinn Féin)	Rhonda Hamilton (DUP)	Allan Bresland (DUP)	Patsy Kelly (SDLP)/(Independent)	Karina Carlin (Sinn Féin)	Paul Gallagher (Independent)
Glenelly DEA (1985-2014)						5 seats (1973-2014)	
2011	Dan Kelly (Sinn Féin)	Michelle McMackin (Sinn Féin)	Rhonda Hamilton (DUP)	Allan Bresland (DUP)	John Donnell (DUP)	5 seats (1973-2014)	
2005	Tom McBride (SDLP)	Claire McGill (Sinn Féin)	James Emery (UUP)	Allan Bresland (DUP)	John Donnell (DUP)	5 seats (1973-2014)	
2001	Tom McBride (SDLP)	Claire McGill (Sinn Féin)	James Emery (UUP)	Allan Bresland (DUP)	John Donnell (DUP)	5 seats (1973-2014)	
1997	Tom McBride (SDLP)	Martin Conway (Sinn Féin)	James Emery (UUP)	Allan Bresland (DUP)	John Donnell (DUP)	5 seats (1973-2014)	
1993	John Gallagher (SDLP)	Samuel Martin (UUP)	James Emery (UUP)	Allan Bresland (DUP)	John Donnell (DUP)	5 seats (1973-2014)	
1989	John Gallagher (SDLP)	Hughes Colhoun (Alliance)	James Emery (UUP)	Samuel Rogers (DUP)	John Donnell (DUP)	5 seats (1973-2014)	
1985	John Gallagher (SDLP)	Thomas McNamee (Sinn Féin)	Mary Britton (UUP)	Samuel Rogers (DUP)	Ronald Brolly (DUP)	5 seats (1973-2014)	
Strabane Area B (1973-1985)						5 seats (1973-2014)	
1981	John Gallagher (SDLP)	Francis McConnell (Independent Nationalist)	Mary Britton (UUP)	Samuel Rogers (DUP)/ (United Loyalist Coalition)	George McIntyre (DUP)	5 seats (1973-2014)	
1977	John Gallagher (SDLP)	Francis McConnell (Independent Nationalist)	Mary Britton (UUP)	Samuel Rogers (DUP)/ (United Loyalist Coalition)	Henry Henderson (UUP)	5 seats (1973-2014)	
1973	Seamus Kearney (SDLP)	Tom Gormley (Alliance)	Mary Britton (UUP)	Samuel Rogers (DUP)/ (United Loyalist Coalition)	Henry Henderson (UUP)	5 seats (1973-2014)	

== See also ==
- List of townlands of County Tyrone
