= Glenmornan River =

River in Northern Ireland

Location
- Country: Northern Ireland
- County: County Tyrone

Physical characteristics
- Source
  - location: Moor Lough
  - coordinates: 54.831°N 7.307°W
  - elevation: 170 m (558 ft)
- Mouth
  - location: River Foyle
  - coordinates: 54.8816°N 7.44°W

Basin features
- River system: Foyle
- Cities: Glenmornan, Artigarvan, Ballymagorry

The Glenmornan River is a river in County Tyrone, Northern Ireland. It is a tributary of the River Foyle.

== Course ==
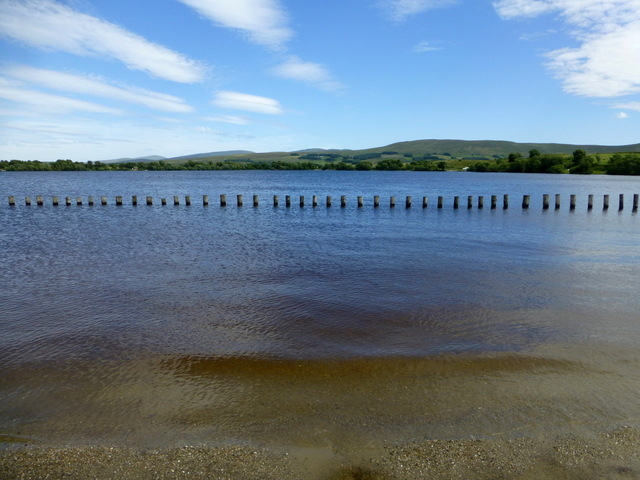
Moor Lough, source of the Glenmornan

The Glenmornan River rises from Moor Lough, about 7 miles (11 km) east of Strabane. The river flows westward, via Glenmornan and Artigarvan to Ballymagorry, where it flows under the A5 road. The Glenmornan joins the River Foyle north of Strabane and west of the A5.

== Wildlife ==
The Glenmornan River is a salmon and trout fishery. In February 2025, a large fish kill occurred on the river near Artigarvan, in what the Loughs Agency described as a pollution incident. They estimated that over 4,000 fish were killed, including 500 European eel, a critically endangered species. Other species included salmon, trout, lamprey and flounder. Dead frogs were also present, indicating a highly toxic pollutant.

== Geology ==
The Glenmornan River at Artigarvan hosts a significant geological site. The river's bed and banks have pillow lavas that are considered among the earliest of the Dalradian Supergroup in Ireland. The best examples lie upstream of Artigarvan. The Dalradian extends from the Scottish Highlands to Connemara.

== See also ==
- Rivers of Ireland
