= Strabane Area A =

District electoral areas in Strabane, Northern Ireland

Strabane Area A was one of the three district electoral areas in Strabane, Northern Ireland which existed from 1973 to 1985. The district elected five members to Strabane District Council, and formed part of the Mid Ulster constituencies for the Northern Ireland Assembly and UK Parliament.

It was created for the 1973 local elections, and contained the wards of Castlederg, Clare, Glenderg, Newtownstewart and Sion Mills. It was abolished for the 1985 local elections and mostly replaced with the Derg DEA, with Sion Mills moving to the Mourne DEA.

== Councillors ==
| Election | Councillor (Party) | Councillor (Party) | Councillor (Party) | Councillor (Party) | Councillor (Party) |
|---|---|---|---|---|---|
| 1981 | Thomas Kerrigan (DUP) | Robert Anderson (DUP) | Edward Turner (UUP) | Mary McCrea (SDLP) | Denis McCrory (Independent Nationalist) |
| 1977 | George McIntyre (DUP) | Ernest Young (UUP) | Edward Turner (UUP) | Daniel Gallagher (SDLP) | Denis McCrory (Independent Nationalist) |
| 1973 | Bobby Moore (UUP) | Ernest Young (UUP) | Frances Hamilton (UUP) | Daniel Gallagher (SDLP) | Denis McCrory (Independent Nationalist) |

== 1981 Election ==
1977: 2 x UUP, 1 x DUP, 1 x SDLP, 1 x Independent Nationalist

1981: 2 x DUP, 1 x UUP, 1 x SDLP, 1 x Independent Nationalist

1977-1981 Change: DUP gain from UUP

Strabane Area A - 5 seats
| Party | Candidate | FPv% | Count | | | |
| Party | Candidate | FPv% | 1 | 2 | 3 | 4 |
|---|---|---|---|---|---|---|
| Ind. Nationalist | Denis McCrory* | 22.11% | 1,320 | | | |
| DUP | Thomas Kerrigan | 20.46% | 1,221 | | | |
| SDLP | Mary McCrea | 17.24% | 1,029 | | | |
| DUP | Robert Anderson | 9.72% | 580 | 581 | 602.6 | 1,070.22 |
| UUP | Edward Turner* | 13.94% | 832 | 882 | 892.26 | 908.42 |
| UUP | Ernest Young* | 11.26% | 672 | 738 | 747.36 | 754.62 |
| DUP | David Baird | 5.28% | 315 | 321 | 497.22 | |
Electorate: 7,833 Valid: 5,969 (76.20%) Spoilt: 193 Quota: 995 Turnout: 6,162 (78.67%)

== 1977 Election ==
1973: 3 x UUP, 1 x SDLP, 1 x Independent Nationalist

1977: 2 x UUP, 1 x SDLP, 1 x DUP, 1 x Independent Nationalist

1973-1977 Change: DUP gain from UUP

Strabane Area A - 5 seats
| Party | Candidate | FPv% | Count | | | | | | |
| Party | Candidate | FPv% | 1 | 2 | 3 | 4 | 5 | 6 | 7 |
|---|---|---|---|---|---|---|---|---|---|
| DUP | George McIntyre | 18.18% | 1,047 | | | | | | |
| Ind. Nationalist | Denis McCrory* | 17.53% | 1,010 | | | | | | |
| SDLP | Daniel Gallagher* | 8.99% | 518 | 518 | 542 | 556 | 764 | 1,002 | |
| UUP | Edward Turner | 13.16% | 758 | 789.04 | 798.2 | 864.32 | 865.32 | 871.4 | 875.4 |
| UUP | Ernest Young* | 12.40% | 714 | 731.04 | 750.04 | 791.28 | 794.28 | 795.28 | 807.28 |
| UUP | Frank Stewart | 10.36% | 597 | 611.24 | 623.32 | 708.44 | 710.44 | 721.52 | 736.52 |
| Independent | Brian MacBride | 7.99% | 460 | 460.08 | 493.16 | 500.24 | 571.24 | | |
| SDLP | Mary McCrea | 5.28% | 304 | 304 | 311 | 313.08 | | | |
| Ind. Unionist | James Moore | 3.56% | 205 | 219.56 | 244.56 | | | | |
| Alliance | James Smyth | 2.55% | 147 | 147.4 | | | | | |
Electorate: 7,693 Valid: 5,760 (74.87%) Spoilt: 266 Quota: 961 Turnout: 6,026 (78.33%)

== 1973 Election ==
1973: 3 x UUP, 1 x SDLP, 1 x Independent Nationalist

Strabane Area A - 5 seats
| Party | Candidate | FPv% | Count | | | | | | | | | |
| Party | Candidate | FPv% | 1 | 2 | 3 | 4 | 5 | 6 | 7 | 8 | 9 | 10 |
|---|---|---|---|---|---|---|---|---|---|---|---|---|
| UUP | Bobby Moore | 19.99% | 1,279 | | | | | | | | | |
| UUP | Ernest Young | 19.55% | 1,251 | | | | | | | | | |
| UUP | Frances Hamilton | 17.55% | 1,123 | | | | | | | | | |
| SDLP | Daniel Gallagher | 15.18% | 971 | 974 | 974 | 975.11 | 987.11 | 989.11 | 996.11 | 1,019.48 | 1,457.48 | |
| Ind. Nationalist | Denis McCrory | 13.46% | 861 | 861 | 861 | 862.48 | 874.48 | 874.48 | 877.48 | 879.85 | 902.8 | 1,011.8 |
| Alliance | Thomas Riddell | 1.83% | 117 | 165 | 298.95 | 325.96 | 341.7 | 377.1 | 385.42 | 563.8 | 581.8 | 606.8 |
| SDLP | Patrick McCallion | 7.28% | 466 | 475 | 476.9 | 479.12 | 484.12 | 487.12 | 527.12 | 537.07 | | |
| Alliance | Lala Nabney | 1.47% | 94 | 129 | 141.35 | 145.79 | 187.9 | 239.13 | 252.03 | | | |
| Independent Labour | Robert King | 1.42% | 91 | 119 | 130.4 | 135.58 | 136.58 | 138.53 | | | | |
| Alliance | James Smyth | 0.81% | 52 | 81 | 104.75 | 116.22 | 121.22 | | | | | |
| Alliance | Eileen Lynch | 1.45% | 93 | 96 | 96 | 97.85 | | | | | | |
Electorate: 7,897 Valid: 6,398 (81.02%) Spoilt: 76 Quota: 1,067 Turnout: 6,474 (81.98%)
