= Ballymagorry =

Village in County Tyrone, Northern Ireland

Coordinates: 54°51′N 7°26′W

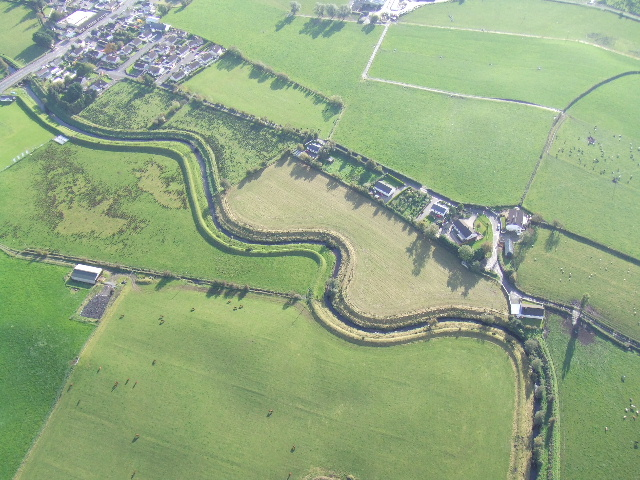
Ballymagorry from above (top left)

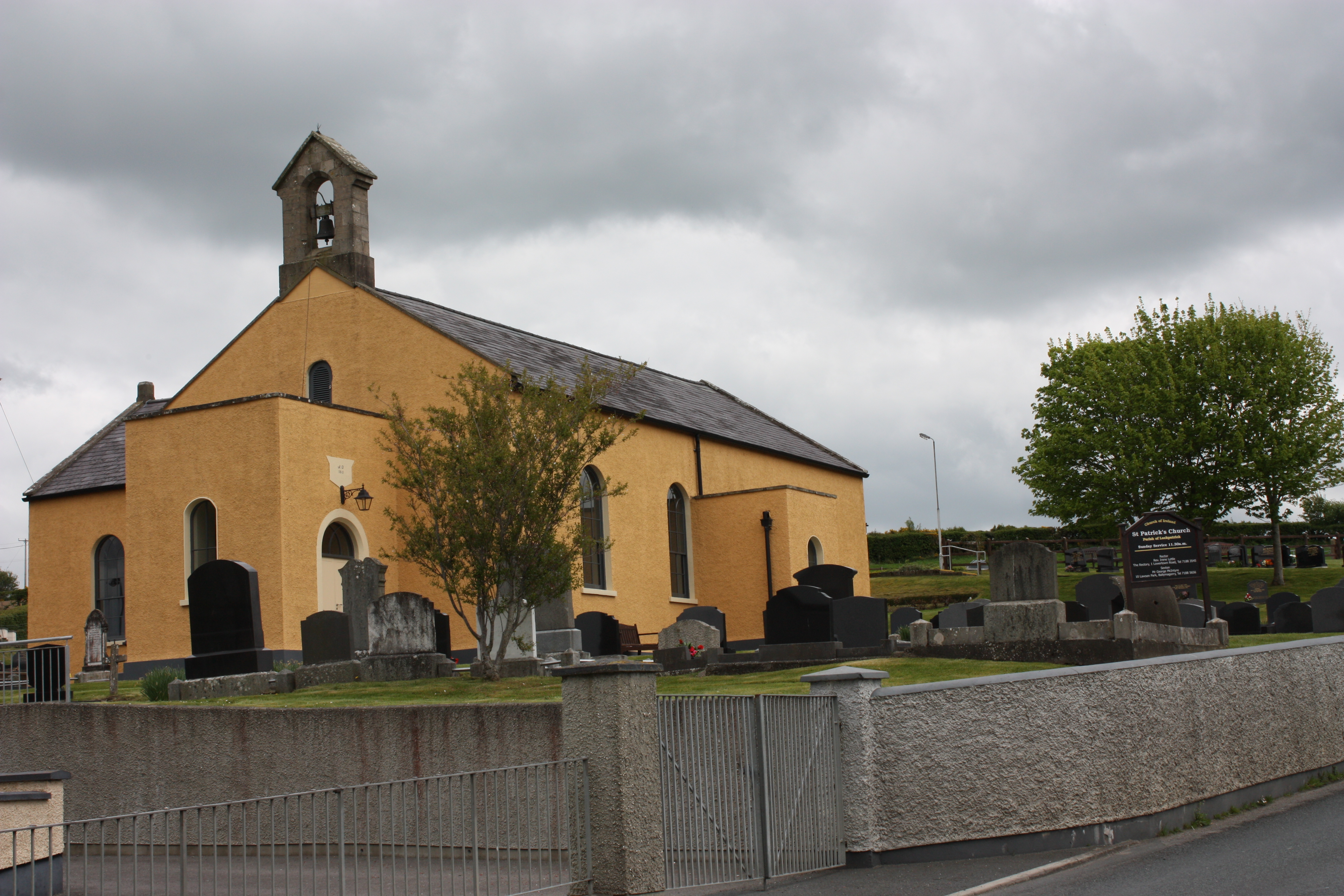
St Patrick's Church

Ballymagorry or Ballymagory (Irish: Baile Mhic Gofraidh, meaning 'MacGorry's townland') is a small village and townland in County Tyrone, Northern Ireland. It is west of Artigarvan and 5 kilometres (3.1 mi) north of Strabane. As of the 2001 census, it had a population of 565. It lies within the Strabane District Council area and lies on the Glenmornan River.

== Geography ==
The village, which is known as Bellymagarry in Ulster-Scots, lies in a townland of the same name. Ballymagorry townland is situated in the historic barony of Strabane Lower and the civil parish of Leckpatrick and covers an area of 289 acres.

== Transport ==
The area was once served by rail with Ballymagorry railway station run by the County Donegal Railway on the section from Strabane (CDR) railway station to Londonderry Victoria Road in Derry line. Ballymagorry station opened on 7 August 1900 but was shut on 1 January 1955. The village lies on the main A5 trunk road between Strabane and 'Derry.

== Demography ==
=== 19th century population ===
The population of Ballymagorry village decreased during the 19th century:

Year	1841	1851	1861	1871	1881	1891
Population	213	169	181	155	127	106
Houses	46	39	39	37	31	25

The population of Ballymagorry townland increased slightly during the 19th century:

Year	1841	1851	1861	1871	1881	1891
Population	65	46	71	80	118	66
Houses	12	11	13	14	21	15

=== 21st century population ===
Ballymagorry is classified as a small village. On census day 2021 (29 April 2001), there were 565 people living in Ballymagorry. Of these:

- 25.3% were aged under 16 years and 15.2% were aged 60 and over
- 50.4% of the population were male and 49.6% were female
- 43.7% were from a Catholic background and 54.0% were from a Protestant background
- 4.8% of people aged 16–74 were unemployed

== Sport ==
Ballymagorry is home to Fox Lodge Cricket Club.

== See also ==
- List of townlands of County Tyrone
