= Maolíosa McHugh =

Northern Ireland politician

Maolíosa McHugh MLA
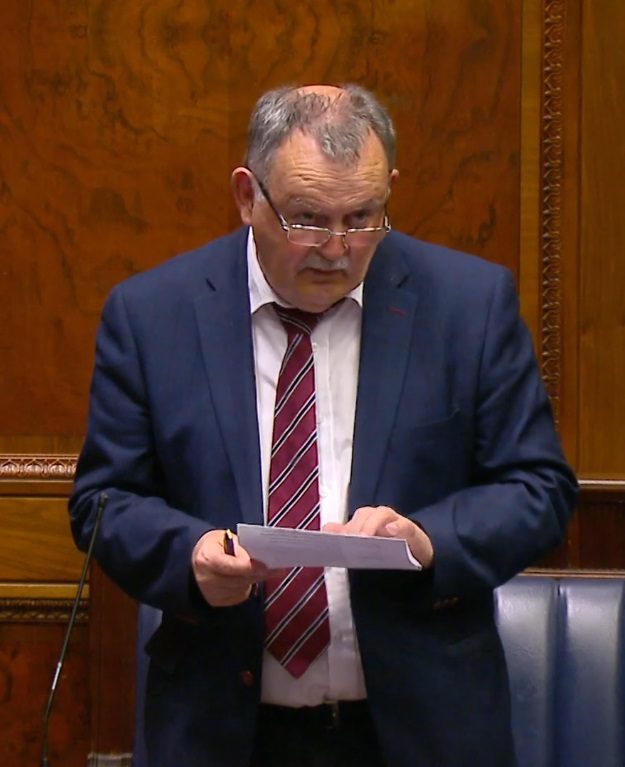
- McHugh in 2021

Member of the Legislative Assembly for West Tyrone
- In office 28 May 2019 – 1 September 2026
- Preceded by: Michaela Boyle
- Succeeded by: Paul Boggs

Member of Derry City and Strabane District Council
- In office 22 May 2014 – 2 May 2019
- Preceded by: Council created
- Succeeded by: Cara Hunter
- Constituency: Derg

Member of Strabane District Council
- In office 5 May 2011 – 22 May 2014
- Preceded by: Gerard Foley
- Succeeded by: Council abolished
- Constituency: Derg

Personal details
- Born: Mournebeg, County Tyrone, Northern Ireland
- Party: Sinn Féin
- Spouse: Geraldine McHugh
- Children: 5
- Education: Kingston Polytechnic, NUI Galway
- Occupation: Lecturer

Maolíosa McHugh (/məˈliːʃə/ mə-LEE-shə) is an Irish Sinn Féin politician who has served as Member of the Legislative Assembly for West Tyrone from 28 May 2019 until he stood down on 1 September 2026. Previously, he was a local councillor and Mayor of Derry and Strabane.

== Early life ==
McHugh was born in Mournebeg, a rural area west of Castlederg, County Tyrone. He worked as a lecturer in the North West Regional College (previously the North West Institute of Further and Higher Education) for almost 33 years.

== Political career ==
McHugh first elected to Strabane District Council in 2011; he continued as member of Derry City and Strabane District Council when they were merged, and he served as Mayor of Derry and Strabane in 2017–18. During his term, he was criticised for refusing to meet Prince Charles or send a council representative to a Buckingham Palace garden party. He lost his seat in the 2019 local election.

McHugh was coopted onto the Northern Ireland Assembly in May 2019. Órfhlaith Begley MP described McHugh as "A true republican with a wealth of knowledge and experience."

On 1 April 2026, he announced he would not constest the next Northern Ireland Assembly election.

Civic offices
Preceded by Hilary McClintock	Mayor of Derry and Strabane; 5 June 2017 – 4 June 2018	Succeeded by John Boyle
Northern Ireland Assembly
Preceded by Michaela Boyle	MLA for West Tyrone; 28 May 2019–1 September 2026	Succeeded by Paul Boggs
