= Strabane Area C =

District electoral areas in Strabane, Northern Ireland

Strabane Area C was one of the three district electoral areas in Strabane, Northern Ireland which existed from 1973 to 1985. The district elected five members to Strabane District Council, and formed part of the Mid Ulster constituency for the Northern Ireland Assembly and for the UK parliament, Mid Ulster until 1983 and Foyle until 1985.

It was created for the 1973 local elections, and contained the wards of East, Finn, North, South and West. For the 1985 local elections it was replaced with the Mourne DEA.

== Councillors ==
Election	Councillor (Party)	Councillor (Party)	Councillor (Party)	Councillor (Party)	Councillor (Party)
1981	Robert Fleming (UUP)	Paul O'Hare (SDLP)	William Flanagan (SDLP)	James O'Kane (Independent Nationalist)	John O'Kane (Independent Nationalist)
1977	Robert Fleming (UUP)	William Carlin (SDLP)	John McKelvey (SDLP)	Ivan Cooper (SDLP)	John O'Kane (Independent Nationalist)
1973	C. Russell (UUP)	William Carlin (SDLP)	John McKelvey (SDLP)	Douglas Cooper (Alliance)	John O'Kane (Independent Nationalist)

== 1981 Election ==
1977: 3 x SDLP, 1 x UUP, 1 x Independent Nationalist

1981: 2 x SDLP, 2 x Independent Nationalist, 1 x UUP

1977-1981 Change: Independent Nationalist gain from SDLP

Strabane Area C - 5 seats
Party	Candidate	FPv%	Count										
Party	Candidate	FPv%	1	2	3	4	5	6	7	8	9	10	11
Ind. Nationalist	James O'Kane	27.52%	1,459										
Ind. Nationalist	John O'Kane*	7.89%	418	818.98	826.8	836.62	857.54	890.18					
SDLP	Paul O'Hare	11.32%	600	659.45	666.27	670.27	682.91	688.32	836.83	902.83			
SDLP	William Flanagan	10.90%	578	599.73	601.14	605.14	610.55	619.78	727.29	790.16	807.96	886.96	
UUP	Robert Fleming*	8.49%	450	450.82	451.82	467.23	472.23	473.23	473.23	475.64	475.94	555.35	562.35
DUP	Desmond Monteith	7.00%	371	371.41	371.41	377.41	385.41	394.41	394.41	394.41	394.41	397.41	399.41
Anti H-Block	William Gallagher	5.58%	296	305.84	313.84	313.84	315.84	331.25	333.25	382.89	385.49	385.49	
Alliance	Patrick Wallace	5.43%	288	304.4	308.81	319.22	339.86	343.86	349.09	370.14	374.04		
Ind. Nationalist	John McCrory	4.66%	247	264.63	272.04	276.04	289.09	303.91	312.32				
SDLP	Jane O'Donnell	5.06%	268	280.3	280.71	281.71	288.94	294.94					
Independent	Michael Dunne	2.17%	115	119.92	123.92	131.92	131.92						
Independent	David Fleming	1.81%	96	108.71	109.71	110.71							
Independent	William Crichton	1.36%	72	73.64	73.64								
Independent	John Tracey	0.81%	43	46.28									
Electorate: 7,630 Valid: 5,301 (69.48%) Spoilt: 146 Quota: 884 Turnout: 5,447 (71.39%)

== 1977 Election ==
1973: 2 x SDLP, 1 x UUP, 1 x Alliance, 1 x Independent Nationalist

1977: 3 x SDLP, 1 x UUP, 1 x Independent Nationalist

1973-1977 Change: SDLP gain from Alliance

Strabane Area C - 5 seats
Party	Candidate	FPv%	Count								
Party	Candidate	FPv%	1	2	3	4	5	6	7	8	9
SDLP	Ivan Cooper	26.72%	1,457								
SDLP	William Carlin*	14.69%	801	1,077.12							
SDLP	John McKelvey*	9.46%	516	683.31	816.75	822.14	834.72	858.69	918.69		
UUP	Robert Fleming	10.67%	582	583.17	583.65	585.04	585.04	586.04	589.04	914.04	
Ind. Nationalist	John O'Kane*	10.86%	592	623.2	631.36	635.36	666.48	692.76	768.84	772.84	913.84
Republican Clubs	Ivan Barr	5.81%	317	332.21	337.01	337.4	393.57	416.74	443.24	444.24	471.26
Alliance	Douglas Cooper*	5.72%	312	323.7	326.34	362.36	365.92	380.79	392.35	406.35	
UUP	Sydney Browne	6.55%	357	357.39	357.39	358.39	358.39	358.39	358.39		
Ind. Nationalist	John McCrory	3.63%	198	208.14	214.14	214.14	222.53	241.4			
Independent	Thomas Forbes	2.68%	146	160.04	166.76	168.39	173.56				
Republican Clubs	Gerard McCafferty	1.22%	67	71.68	72.4	74.4					
Independent	James McDaid	1.05%	57	63.63	64.83	64.83					
Alliance	Mamie Quigley	0.94%	51	54.51	55.47						
Electorate: 7,754 Valid: 5,453 (70.32%) Spoilt: 317 Quota: 909 Turnout: 5,770 (74.41%)

== 1973 Election ==
1973: 2 x SDLP, 1 x UUP, 1 x Alliance, 1 x Independent Nationalist

Strabane Area C - 5 seats
Party	Candidate	FPv%	Count										
Party	Candidate	FPv%	1	2	3	4	5	6	7	8	9	10	11
Ind. Nationalist	John O'Kane	20.83%	1,164										
UUP	C. Russell	20.58%	1,150										
SDLP	John McKelvey	11.31%	632	664.76	667.58	673.1	691.4	772.84	791.44	895.06	????		
SDLP	William Carlin	8.70%	486	525.78	525.78	536.34	544.38	584.84	597.54	703.38	????	????	
Alliance	Douglas Cooper	6.10%	341	356.6	498.54	502.27	577.51	589.55	792.15	798.45	????	????	????
Republican Clubs	Ivan Barr	10.95%	612	648.14	650.49	723.21	724.73	738.59	744.11	765.23	????	????	????
SDLP	John McGurk	6.57%	367	381.82	382.76	385.02	391.28	432.84	439.3	483.16			
SDLP	Bridie McMenamin	3.94%	220	247.56	247.56	250.08	253.6	293.46	295.98				
Alliance	Sheila Sinclair	2.42%	135	147.48	203.88	208.96	279.18	285.96					
SDLP	Margaret Duddy	3.67%	205	225.8	226.74	231.78	242.34						
Alliance	Patrick McDaid	3.20%	179	191.74	197.38	199.38							
Republican Clubs	Thomas Barr	0.79%	44	50.76	53.58								
Republican Clubs	Joseph Dillon	0.50%	28	31.12	31.12								
Republican Clubs	Brendan Douglas	0.45%	25	27.34	28.75								
Electorate: 7,752 Valid: 5,588 (72.08%) Spoilt: 121 Quota: 932 Turnout: 5,709 (73.65%)

- Data missing from stages 9 to 11
