= Ballyheather Halt railway station =

Railway station in Northern Ireland

Coordinates: 54.8792°N 7.3991°W

Ballyheather Halt

General information
- Location: County Tyrone, Northern Ireland; UK

History
- Opened: 1 February 1902
- Closed: 1 January 1955
- Original company: Donegal Railway Company
- Post-grouping: County Donegal Railways Joint Committee

Services
Preceding station	Donegal Railway Company	Following station
Donemana	Londonderry to Strabane 1900-1955	Ballymagorry
Location
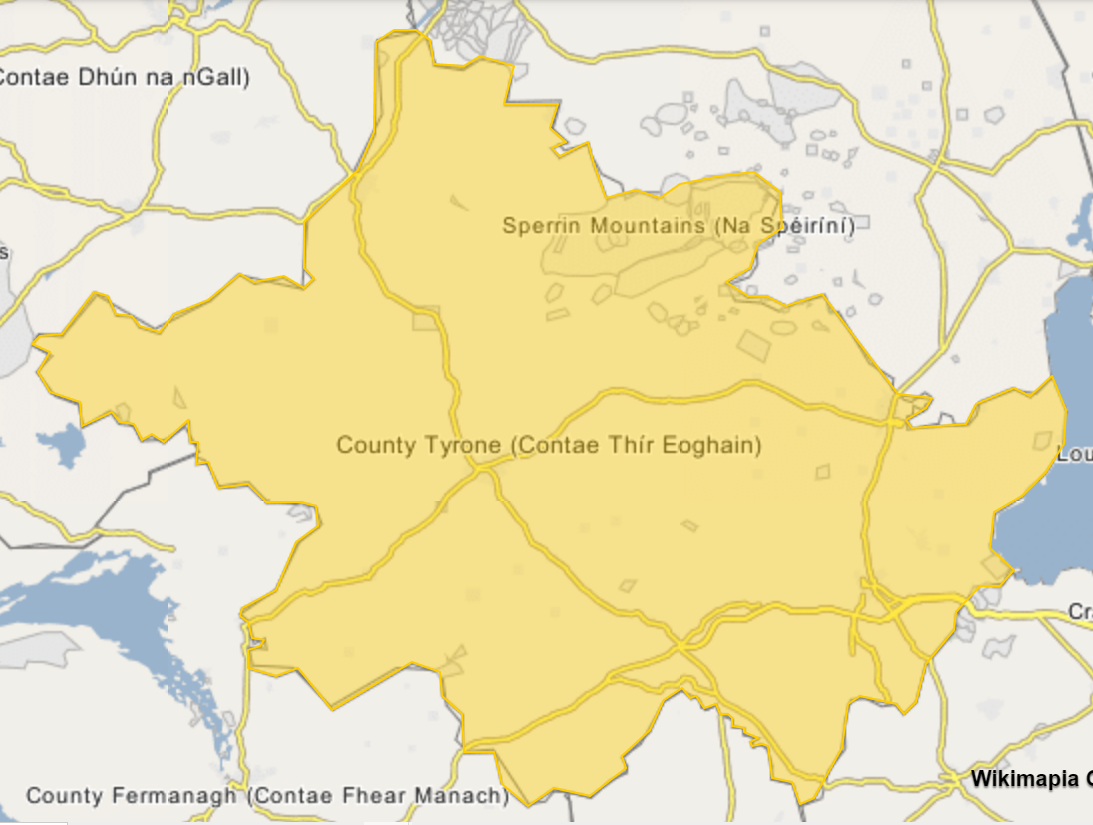
- Location within County Tyrone Location within Northern Ireland Location within the United Kingdom

Ballyheather Halt railway station served Ballyheather, County Tyrone in Northern Ireland.

It was opened by the Donegal Railway Company on 1 February 1902. It closed on 1 January 1955.
