= Donemana railway station =

Railway station in Northern Ireland

Donemana

General information
- Location: County Tyrone, Northern Ireland; UK
- Coordinates: 54.887141°N 7.374360°W

History
- Original company: Donegal Railway Company
- Post-grouping: County Donegal Railways Joint Committee

Key dates
- 6 August 1900: Station opens
- 1 January 1955: Station closes
Location

Donemana railway station served Donemana, County Tyrone in Northern Ireland.

It was opened by the Donegal Railway Company on 6 August 1900. It closed on 1 January 1955.

== Accident ==
The station was the site of a fatal accident after 9 p.m. on Sunday 7 September 1913, when an approaching train from Derry failed to slow down and stop. One person was killed and several injured, some seriously. One of the small group of passengers travelling from Derry, Margaret McCay, wife of farmer John McCay, from the townland of Gortileck between the villages of Dunamanagh and Artigarvan, was five months pregnant and suffered a mild concussion in the accident. She and the unborn child survived, with the safe arrival of John McCay on 4 January 1914. The Board of Trade enquiry found 'excessive speed' and an 'intoxicated driver and fireman' to be the cause of the accident.

== Routes ==
Preceding station	Disused railways	Following station
Cullion	Donegal Railway Company; Londonderry to Strabane 1900–1955	Ballyheather Halt
