= Lakeland Dairies =

Irish dairy co-operative

Lakeland Dairies Group

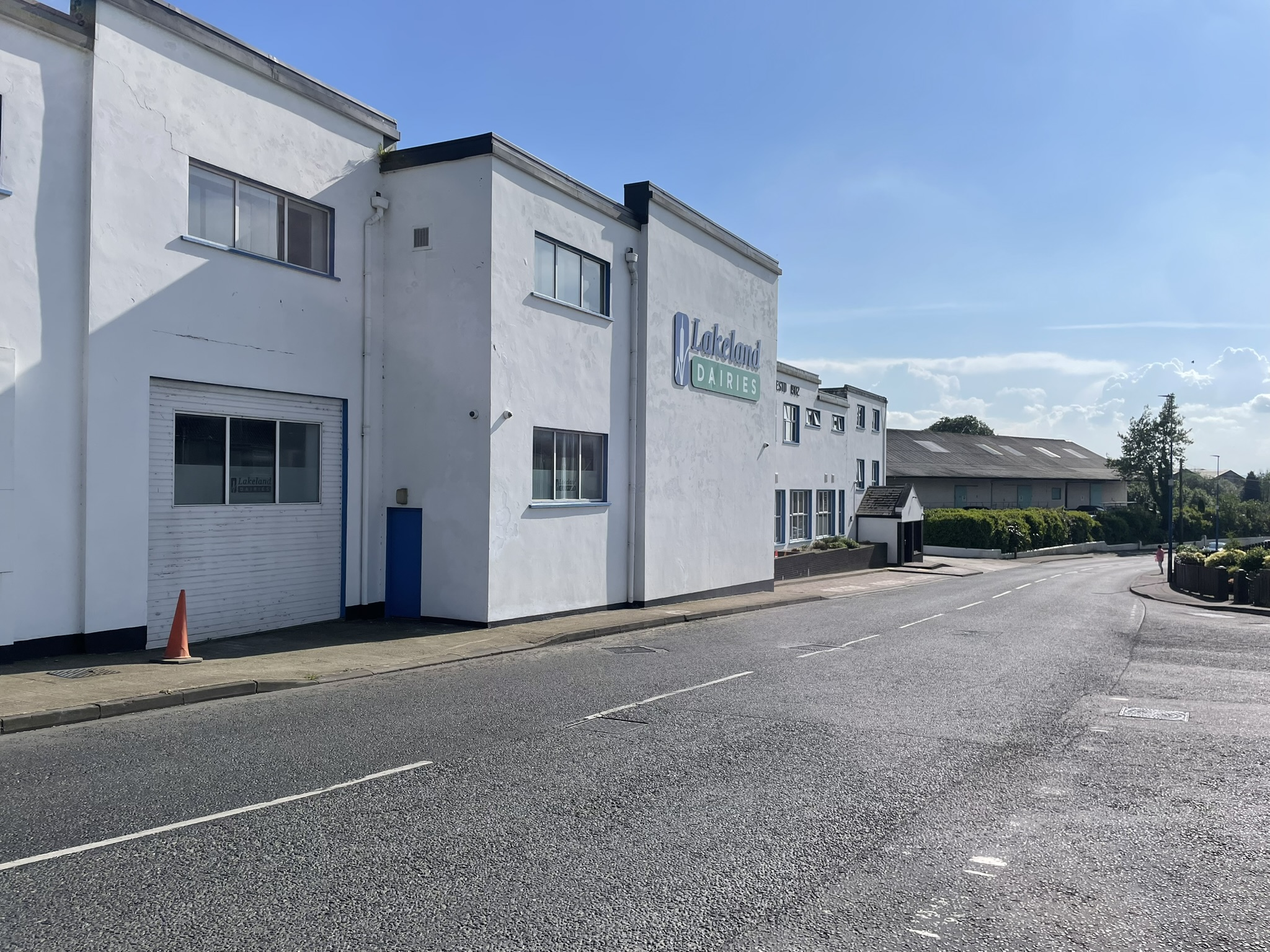
- Manufacturing plant at Artigarvan, Northern Ireland
- Company type: Cooperative
- Industry: Dairy
- Founded: 1990
- Headquarters: Cavan, Ireland
- Area served: Global
- Key people: Niall Matthews (Chairman); Colin Kelly (CEO)
- Revenue: ▲€1.9 billion (2022)
- Operating income: ▲€32.5 million (2022)
- Net income: ▲€24.5 million (2022)
- Total assets: ▲€153.6 million (2022)
- Members: 3,200
- Number of employees: 1,200
- Website: Lakeland.ie

Lakeland Dairies Group is an Irish dairy co-operative based in County Cavan, Ireland. It operates across sixteen counties on the island of Ireland, in both the Republic of Ireland and Northern Ireland. Lakeland Dairies processes more than 2 billion litres of milk annually from 3,200 suppliers making it Ireland's largest dairy co-operative, and second largest milk processor after Tirlán. Lakeland Dairies currently has dedicated operations in Ireland, the United Kingdom and the United States and exports 240 dairy products to 100 countries worldwide.

== Acquisitions ==
- In 2003, Lakeland acquired UK food supplier L.E. Pritchitt & Company for €18.5 million.
- Taste Trends Ltd, one of the UK's largest frozen yoghurt producers, was acquired by Lakeland for an undisclosed sum in 2015.
- Following a series of agribusiness and dairy joint ventures between Lakeland and Fane Valley - a Northern Irish milk co-operative which produced over 250 million litres of milk annually - Lakeland acquired Fane Valley Dairies in early 2016.
- Lakeland and County Monaghan-based LacPatrick Dairies agreed on a merger in 2018 following unanimous approval by both co-operatives' respective boards in May, and shareholders in October. In early 2019 the companies merged, which increased the total number of Lakeland Dairies milk suppliers to 3,200 - with a collective pool of over 1.85 billion litres of milk per annum.
- In August 2020, Lakeland Dairies reported that annual revenue in 2019 had topped €1 billion for the first time.
