= Strabane Area B =

District electoral areas in Strabane, Northern Ireland

Strabane Area B was one of the three district electoral areas in Strabane, Northern Ireland which existed from 1973 to 1985. The district elected five members to Strabane District Council, and formed part of the Mid Ulster constituencies for the Northern Ireland Assembly and UK Parliament.

It was created for the 1973 local elections, and contained the wards of Artigarvan, Dunnamanagh, Plumbridge, Slievekirk and Victoria Bridge. It was abolished for the 1985 local elections and replaced with the Glenelly DEA.

== Councillors ==
Election	Councillor (Party)	Councillor (Party)	Councillor (Party)	Councillor (Party)	Councillor (Party)
1981	Samuel Rogers (DUP)/ (United Loyalist Coalition)	George McIntyre (DUP)	Mary Britton (UUP)	John Gallagher (SDLP)	Francis McConnell (Independent Nationalist)
1977	Samuel Rogers (DUP)/ (United Loyalist Coalition)	Henry Henderson (UUP)	Mary Britton (UUP)	John Gallagher (SDLP)	Francis McConnell (Independent Nationalist)
1973	Samuel Rogers (DUP)/ (United Loyalist Coalition)	Henry Henderson (UUP)	Mary Britton (UUP)	Seamus Kearney (SDLP)	Tom Gormley (Alliance)

== 1981 Election ==
1977: 2 x UUP, 1 x DUP, 1 x SDLP, 1 x Independent Nationalist

1981: 2 x DUP, 1 x UUP, 1 x SDLP, 1 x Independent Nationalist

1977-1981 Change: DUP gain from UUP

Strabane Area B - 5 seats
Party	Candidate	FPv%	Count	
Party	Candidate	FPv%	1	2
SDLP	John Gallagher*	18.92%	1,101	
Ind. Nationalist	Francis McConnell*	17.44%	1,015	
UUP	Mary Britton*	16.91%	984	
DUP	Samuel Rogers*	16.72%	973	
DUP	George McIntyre*	14.21%	827	832
UUP	Henry Henderson*	10.43%	607	624
SDLP	Mary McAleer	5.38%	313	
Electorate: 7,050 Valid: 5,820 (82.55%) Spoilt: 177 Quota: 971 Turnout: 5,997 (85.06%)

== 1977 Election ==
1973: 2 x UUP, 1 x SDLP, 1 x Alliance, 1 x United Loyalist Coalition

1977: 2 x UUP, 1 x SDLP, 1 x DUP, 1 x Independent Nationalist

1973-1977 Change: Independent Nationalist gain from Alliance, United Loyalist Coalition joins DUP

Strabane Area B - 5 seats
Party	Candidate	FPv%	Count			
Party	Candidate	FPv%	1	2	3	4
DUP	Samuel Rogers*	21.96%	1,237			
UUP	Mary Britton*	19.83%	1,117			
SDLP	John Gallagher	17.84%	1,005			
UUP	Henry Henderson*	14.95%	842	1,128		
Ind. Nationalist	Francis McConnell	12.52%	705	705.25	749.25	855.25
SDLP	Aidan McNamee	9.55%	538	538.25	548.25	595.5
Independent	James McCormick	2.89%	163	163	205	
Independent	James Tinney	0.46%	26	27	30	
Electorate: 7,110 Valid: 5,633 (79.23%) Spoilt: 214 Quota: 939 Turnout: 5,847 (82.24%)

== 1973 Election ==
1973: 2 x UUP, 1 x SDLP, 1 x Alliance, 1 x United Loyalist Coalition

Strabane Area B - 5 seats
Party	Candidate	FPv%	Count								
Party	Candidate	FPv%	1	2	3	4	5	6	7	8	9
UUP	Mary Britton	20.45%	1,291								
UUP	Henry Henderson	16.25%	1,026	1,128							
United Loyalist Coalition	Samuel Rogers	16.60%	1,048	1,069.42							
SDLP	Seamus Kearney	14.84%	937	937	937	946	947	953	1,118		
Alliance	Tom Gormley	9.09%	574	517.24	534.04	544.04	584.76	772.5	856.5	876.3	1,051.2
SDLP	John Melaugh	6.76%	427	427	427	465	468.8	469.8	503.8	536.36	731.64
Independent	James McCormick	5.72%	361	361.54	363.14	389.14	393.14	402.92	476.92	488.8	
SDLP	Francis McConnell	5.99%	378	378	378	389	389	391			
Alliance	Edward Brown	2.28%	144	152.28	200.28	200.28	292.62				
Alliance	Robert Sproule	1.39%	88	91.42	190.62	190.62					
Independent	John Tracey	1.55%	98	98	98						
Electorate: 7,343 Valid: 6,312 (85.96%) Spoilt: 54 Quota: 1,053 Turnout: 6,366 (86.69%)
