= Glenmornan =

Hamlet in Northern Ireland

Coordinates: 54.843°N 7.365°W

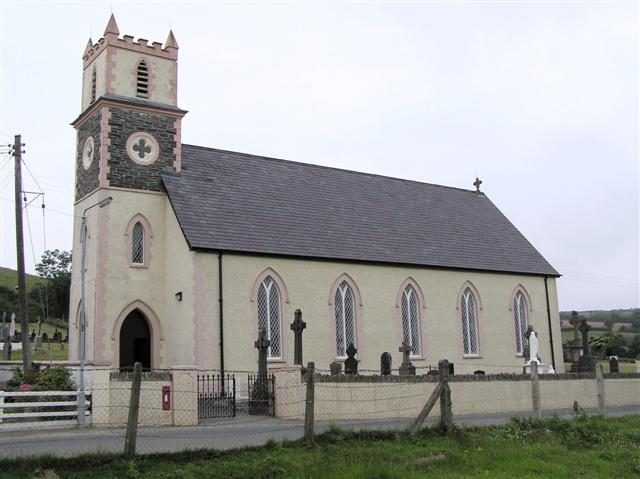
Glenmornan (Roman Catholic) Church, usually known locally as 'Glenmornan Chapel'

Glenmornan (from Irish Gleann Mórnáin) is a hamlet in County Tyrone, Northern Ireland. It is in the townland of Brownhill, northeast of Strabane, and southeast of Artigarvan. In the 2021 census it had a population of 175 people. Glenmornan is in the Strabane District Council area.

Glenmornan is the setting for Oscar winning 2022 short film An Irish Goodbye.

== Sport ==
Owen Roe O'Neill's GAC is the local Gaelic Athletic Association club.
