= Paul Boggs =

Northern Irish politician

Paul Boggs MLA

Member of the Northern Ireland Assembly for West Tyrone
- Incumbent
- Assumed office 7 September 2026
- Preceded by: Maoliosa McHugh

Member of Derry City and Strabane District Council
- Incumbent
- Assumed office 18 May 2023
- Preceded by: Dan Kelly
- Constituency: Sperrin

Personal details
- Party: Sinn Féin

Paul Boggs is a Sinn Féin politician, serving as a Member of the Northern Ireland Assembly (MLA) for West Tyrone since September 2026.

He was first elected as a councillor on Derry City and Strabane District Council for the Sperrin DEA in 2023, and was co-opted into the Northern Ireland Assembly in September 2026 following the resignation of Maoliosa McHugh.
