= Ballymagorry railway station =

Former railway station in Northern Ireland

Ballymagorry
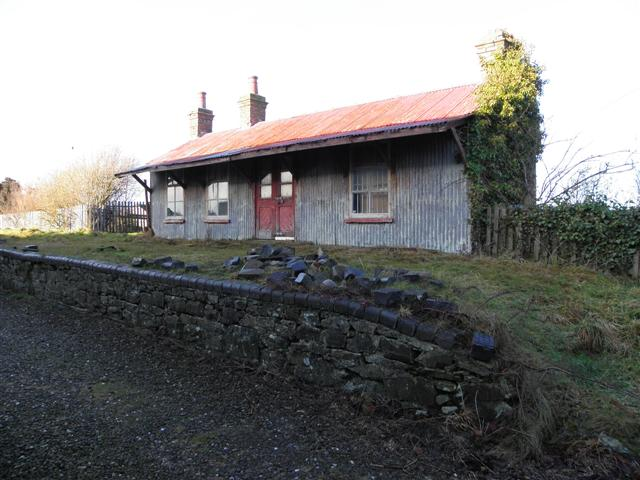
- The remains of Ballymagorry railway station

General information
- Location: County Tyrone; Northern Ireland
- Coordinates: 54.8565°N 7.4269°W

Other information
- Status: Disused

History
- Original company: Donegal Railway Company
- Post-grouping: County Donegal Railways Joint Committee

Key dates
- 7 August 1900: Station opens
- 1 January 1955: Station closes
Location

Ballymagorry railway station served Ballymagorry, County Tyrone in Northern Ireland.

It was opened by the Donegal Railway Company on 7 August 1900.

It closed on 1 January 1955.

== Routes ==
| Preceding station | Disused railways | Following station |
|---|---|---|
| Ballyheather Halt | Donegal Railway Company; Londonderry to Strabane 1900-1955 | Strabane (CDR) |
