= 1997 Strabane District Council election =

Local govt election in Northern Ireland

- 21 May 1997

All 16 seats to Strabane District Council 9 seats needed for a majority
	First party	Second party	Third party
Party	SDLP	Sinn Féin	UUP
Seats won	5	4	3
Seat change	0	▲2	▼1
	Fourth party	Fifth party	Sixth party
Party	DUP	Ind. Nationalist	Ind. Unionist
Seats won	3	1	0
Seat change	0	0	▼1
- Results by district electoral area, shaded by First Preference Votes.

Elections to Strabane District Council were held on 21 May 1997 on the same day as the other Northern Irish local government elections. The election used three district electoral areas to elect a total of 16 councillors.

== Election results ==
Strabane District Council Election Result 1997
Party	Seats	Gains	Losses	Net gain/loss	Seats %	Votes %	Votes	+/−
SDLP	5	0	0	0	31.3	22.9	4,406	▼4.4
Sinn Féin	4	2	0	▲2	25.0	33.1	6,364	▲12.0
UUP	3	1	2	▼1	18.8	23.6	4,547	▲3.7
DUP	3	0	0	0	18.8	14.7	2,821	▼5.2
Ind. Nationalist	1	0	0	0	6.3	4.8	915	▼0.5
Alliance	0	0	0	0	0.0	0.9	182	▼1.3

Note: "Votes" are the first preference votes.

== Districts summary ==
Results of the Strabane District Council election, 1997 by district
Ward	%	Cllrs	%	Cllrs	%	Cllrs	%	Cllrs	%	Cllrs	Total Cllrs
Ward	SDLP		Sinn Féin		UUP		DUP		Others		Total Cllrs
Derg	17.2	1	32.1	1	33.8	2	16.9	1	0.0	0	5
Glenelly	19.5	1	19.3	1	27.7	1	30.1	2	3.4	0	5
Mourne	30.6	3	45.3	2	11.6	0	0.0	0	12.5	1	6
Total	22.9	5	33.1	4	23.6	3	14.7	3	5.7	1	16

== District results ==
=== Derg ===
1993: 1 x UUP, 1 x Sinn Féin, 1 x SDLP, 1 x DUP, 1 x Independent Unionist
1997: 2 x UUP, 1 x Sinn Féin, 1 x SDLP, 1 x DUP
1993-1997 Change: Independent Unionist joins UUP

Derg - 5 seats
Party	Candidate	FPv%	Count				
Party	Candidate	FPv%	1	2	3	4	5
Sinn Féin	Charles McHugh*	23.32%	1,440				
UUP	Derek Hussey*	20.19%	1,247				
UUP	Edward Turner*	13.57%	838	838.58	988.35	1,047.73	
DUP	Thomas Kerrigan*	9.65%	596	596.29	647.8	1,034.7	
SDLP	Tomás Murtagh	8.91%	550	583.06	584.08	584.08	1,022.08
Sinn Féin	Sean Elliott	8.82%	545	886.62	886.79	887.96	944.53
SDLP	Bernadette McNamee	8.31%	513	543.16	543.84	544.84	
DUP	Sarah Anderson	7.24%	447	447.29	454.94		
Electorate: 8,241 Valid: 6,176 (74.94%) Spoilt: 128 Quota: 1,030 Turnout: 6,304 (76.50%)

=== Glenelly ===
1993: 2 x DUP, 2 x UUP, 1 x SDLP
1997: 2 x DUP, 1 x UUP, 1 x SDLP, 1 x Sinn Féin
1993-1997 Change: Sinn Féin gain from UUP

Glenelly - 5 seats
Party	Candidate	FPv%	Count					
Party	Candidate	FPv%	1	2	3	4	5	6
SDLP	Tom McBride	19.53%	1,155					
Sinn Féin	Martin Conway	19.34%	1,144					
DUP	Allan Bresland*	18.61%	1,101					
UUP	James Emery*	13.84%	1,021					
DUP	John Donnell*	11.45%	677	677.42	680.72	781.82	805.61	822.73
UUP	Wilfred Sinclair	10.41%	616	616.63	617.95	624.75	633.8	708.62
Alliance	Elizabeth McCaffrey	1.47%	87	196.62	281.76	281.76	350.45	
Ind. Nationalist	John Gallagher*	1.93%	114	166.92	230.61	231.91		
Electorate: 7,727 Valid: 5,915 (76.55%) Spoilt: 99 Quota: 986 Turnout: 6,014 (77.83%)

=== Mourne ===
1993: 3 x SDLP, 1 x Sinn Féin, 1 x UUP, 1 x Independent Nationalist
1997: 3 x SDLP, 2 x Sinn Féin, 1 x Independent Nationalist
1993-1997 Change: Sinn Féin gain from UUP

Mourne - 6 seats
Party	Candidate	FPv%	Count					
Party	Candidate	FPv%	1	2	3	4	5	6
Sinn Féin	Ivan Barr*	27.42%	1,959					
Sinn Féin	Jarlath McNulty	17.86%	1,276					
SDLP	Thomas Mullen	15.73%	1,124					
Ind. Nationalist	James O'Kane*	11.21%	801	1,224.28				
SDLP	Eugene McMenamin	10.58%	756	1,091.96				
SDLP	Ann Bell*	4.31%	308	471.54	701.94	740.82	940.57	1,039.9
UUP	John Cummings*	11.55%	825	830.92	842.12	878.86	882.26	882.81
Alliance	Marie Wallace	1.33%	95	98.7	109.1			
Electorate: 10,298 Valid: 7,144 (69.37%) Spoilt: 125 Quota: 1,021 Turnout: 7,269 (70.59%)
