= Michaela Boyle =

Politician from Northern Ireland

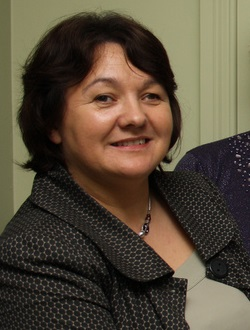

Member of Derry City and Strabane District Council
- In office 2 May 2019 – 18 May 2023
- Preceded by: Brian McMahon
- Succeeded by: Brian Harte
- Constituency: Sperrin

Member of the Northern Ireland Assembly for West Tyrone
- In office 5 May 2011 – May 2019
- Preceded by: Claire McGill
- Succeeded by: Maolíosa McHugh

Member of Strabane District Council
- In office 2008 – 5 May 2011

Personal details
- Born: 29 September 1966 (age 59)
- Party: Sinn Féin

Michaela Boyle (born 29 September 1966) is a Sinn Féin politician in Northern Ireland. In 2008, she was co-opted onto Strabane District Council to fill the vacancy left by the death of her party colleague Cllr Ivan Barr. She served as Chairperson of Council from 2010 to 2011. She was elected to the Northern Ireland Assembly in 2011 as a Member of the Legislative Assembly (MLA)representing the West Tyrone constituency. She was re-elected in 2016 and 2017

== Career ==
She was co-opted to Strabane District Council in 2008.

Boyle was elected to Derry City and Strabane District Council at the local elections on 2 May 2019. She was elected as Mayor of the Council at its first sitting following the council election. She then resigned her Assembly seat, and Maolíosa McHugh was co-opted to the Assembly in her place.

Northern Ireland Assembly
Preceded by Claire McGill	MLA for West Tyrone; 2011–2019	Succeeded by Maolíosa McHugh
