= 1973 Strabane District Council election =

Local govt election in Northern Ireland

30 May 1973	1977 →

All 15 seats to Strabane District Council 8 seats needed for a majority
	First party	Second party	Third party
Party	UUP	SDLP	Alliance
Seats won	6	4	2
	Fourth party	Fifth party
Party	Ind. Nationalist	United Loyalist Coalition
Seats won	2	1

Elections to Strabane District Council were held on 30 May 1973 on the same day as the other Northern Irish local government elections. The election used three district electoral areas to elect a total of 15 councillors.

== Election results ==
Party	Seats	±	First Pref. votes	FPv%	±%
UUP	6		7,120	38.9	
SDLP	4		4,789	26.2	
Ind. Nationalist	2		2,025	11.1	
Alliance	2		1,757	9.6	
United Loyalist Coalition	1		1,048	5.7	
Republican Clubs	0		709	3.9	
Independent	0		459	2.5	
Independent Labour	0		91	0.5	
Totals	15		18,298	100.0	—

== Districts summary ==
Results of the Strabane District Council election, 1973 by district
Ward	%	Cllrs	%	Cllrs	%	Cllrs	%	Cllrs	Total Cllrs
Ward	UUP		SDLP		Alliance		Others		Total Cllrs
Area A	57.1	3	22.5	1	5.6	0	14.8	1	5
Area B	36.7	2	27.6	1	11.8	1	23.9	1	5
Area C	20.6	1	34.2	2	11.7	1	33.5	1	5
Total	38.9	6	26.2	4	9.6	2	25.3	3	15

== Districts results ==
=== Area A ===
1973: 3 x UUP, 1 x SDLP, 1 x Independent Nationalist

Strabane Area A - 5 seats
Party	Candidate	FPv%	Count									
Party	Candidate	FPv%	1	2	3	4	5	6	7	8	9	10
UUP	Bobby Moore	19.99%	1,279									
UUP	Ernest Young	19.55%	1,251									
UUP	Frances Hamilton	17.55%	1,123									
SDLP	Daniel Gallagher	15.18%	971	974	974	975.11	987.11	989.11	996.11	1,019.48	1,457.48	
Ind. Nationalist	Denis McCrory	13.46%	861	861	861	862.48	874.48	874.48	877.48	879.85	902.8	1,011.8
Alliance	Thomas Riddell	1.83%	117	165	298.95	325.96	341.7	377.1	385.42	563.8	581.8	606.8
SDLP	Patrick McCallion	7.28%	466	475	476.9	479.12	484.12	487.12	527.12	537.07		
Alliance	Lala Nabney	1.47%	94	129	141.35	145.79	187.9	239.13	252.03			
Independent Labour	Robert King	1.42%	91	119	130.4	135.58	136.58	138.53				
Alliance	James Smyth	0.81%	52	81	104.75	116.22	121.22					
Alliance	Eileen Lynch	1.45%	93	96	96	97.85						
Electorate: 7,897 Valid: 6,398 (81.02%) Spoilt: 76 Quota: 1,067 Turnout: 6,474 (81.98%)

=== Area B ===
1973: 2 x UUP, 1 x SDLP, 1 x Alliance, 1 x United Loyalist Coalition

Strabane Area B - 5 seats
Party	Candidate	FPv%	Count								
Party	Candidate	FPv%	1	2	3	4	5	6	7	8	9
UUP	Mary Britton	20.45%	1,291								
UUP	Henry Henderson	16.25%	1,026	1,128							
United Loyalist Coalition	Samuel Rogers	16.60%	1,048	1,069.42							
SDLP	Seamus Kearney	14.84%	937	937	937	946	947	953	1,118		
Alliance	Tom Gormley	9.09%	574	517.24	534.04	544.04	584.76	772.5	856.5	876.3	1,051.2
SDLP	John Melaugh	6.76%	427	427	427	465	468.8	469.8	503.8	536.36	731.64
Independent	James McCormick	5.72%	361	361.54	363.14	389.14	393.14	402.92	476.92	488.8	
SDLP	Francis McConnell	5.99%	378	378	378	389	389	391			
Alliance	Edward Brown	2.28%	144	152.28	200.28	200.28	292.62				
Alliance	Robert Sproule	1.39%	88	91.42	190.62	190.62					
Independent	John Tracey	1.55%	98	98	98						
Electorate: 7,343 Valid: 6,312 (85.96%) Spoilt: 54 Quota: 1,053 Turnout: 6,366 (86.69%)

=== Area C ===
1973: 2 x SDLP, 1 x UUP, 1 x Alliance, 1 x Independent Nationalist

Strabane Area C - 5 seats
Party	Candidate	FPv%	Count										
Party	Candidate	FPv%	1	2	3	4	5	6	7	8	9	10	11
Ind. Nationalist	John O'Kane	20.83%	1,164										
UUP	C. Russell	20.58%	1,150										
SDLP	John McKelvey	11.31%	632	664.76	667.58	673.1	691.4	772.84	791.44	895.06	????		
SDLP	William Carlin	8.70%	486	525.78	525.78	536.34	544.38	584.84	597.54	703.38	????	????	
Alliance	Douglas Cooper	6.10%	341	356.6	498.54	502.27	577.51	589.55	792.15	798.45	????	????	????
Republican Clubs	Ivan Barr	10.95%	612	648.14	650.49	723.21	724.73	738.59	744.11	765.23	????	????	????
SDLP	John McGurk	6.57%	367	381.82	382.76	385.02	391.28	432.84	439.3	483.16			
SDLP	Bridie McMenamin	3.94%	220	247.56	247.56	250.08	253.6	293.46	295.98				
Alliance	Sheila Sinclair	2.42%	135	147.48	203.88	208.96	279.18	285.96					
SDLP	Margaret Duddy	3.67%	205	225.8	226.74	231.78	242.34						
Alliance	Patrick McDaid	3.20%	179	191.74	197.38	199.38							
Republican Clubs	Thomas Barr	0.79%	44	50.76	53.58								
Republican Clubs	Joseph Dillon	0.50%	28	31.12	31.12								
Republican Clubs	Brendan Douglas	0.45%	25	27.34	28.75								
Electorate: 7,752 Valid: 5,588 (72.08%) Spoilt: 121 Quota: 932 Turnout: 5,709 (73.65%)

- Data missing from stages 9 to 11
