= Sperrin (District Electoral Area) =

District electoral area in Northern Ireland

- Derry and Strabane District Council DEA constituency

Current constituency
- Created: 2014
- Seats: 7 (2014-)
- Councillors: Jason Barr (IND); Raymond Barr (IND); Paul Boggs (SF); Paul Gallagher (IND); Brian Harte (SF); Fergal Leonard (SF); Gary Wilkinson (DUP)

Sperrin DEA within Derry City and Strabane

Sperrin DEA (1993-2014) within Magherafelt

Sperrin is one of the seven district electoral areas (DEA) in Derry and Strabane, Northern Ireland. The district elects seven members to Derry and Strabane District Council and contains the wards of Artigarvan, Ballycolman, Dunnamanagh, Glenelly Valley, Park, Strabane North and Strabane West. Sperrin forms part of the West Tyrone constituencies for the Northern Ireland Assembly and UK Parliament.

It was created for the 2014 local elections, largely replacing the Glenelly DEA and the Mourne DEA which had existed since 1985.

== Councillors ==
| Election | Councillor (Party) | Councillor (Party) | Councillor (Party) | Councillor (Party) | Councillor (Party) | Councillor (Party) | Councillor (Party) |
|---|---|---|---|---|---|---|---|
| April 2024 Defection | Paul Boggs (Sinn Féin) | Brian Harte (Sinn Féin) | Fergal Leonard (Sinn Féin) | Gary Wilkinson (DUP) | Jason Barr (SDLP)/ (Independent) | Raymond Barr (Independent) | Paul Gallagher (Independent) |
| October 2023 Co-Option | Paul Boggs (Sinn Féin) | Brian Harte (Sinn Féin) | Fergal Leonard (Sinn Féin) | Gary Wilkinson (DUP) | Jason Barr (SDLP)/ (Independent) | Raymond Barr (Independent) | Paul Gallagher (Independent) |
| 2023 | Paul Boggs (Sinn Féin) | Brian Harte (Sinn Féin) | Fergal Leonard (Sinn Féin) | Allan Bresland (DUP) | Jason Barr (SDLP)/ (Independent) | Raymond Barr (Independent) | Paul Gallagher (Independent) |
| 2019 | Dan Kelly (Sinn Féin) | Michaela Boyle (Sinn Féin) | Maurice Devenney (DUP) | Allan Bresland (DUP) | Jason Barr (SDLP)/ (Independent) | Raymond Barr (Independent) | Paul Gallagher (Independent) |
| April 2016 Defection | Dan Kelly (Sinn Féin) | Brian McMahon (Sinn Féin) | Rhonda Hamilton (DUP) | Allan Bresland (DUP) | Patsy Kelly (SDLP)/ (Independent) | Karina Carlin (Sinn Féin) | Paul Gallagher (Independent) |
| 2014 | Dan Kelly (Sinn Féin) | Brian McMahon (Sinn Féin) | Rhonda Hamilton (DUP) | Allan Bresland (DUP) | Patsy Kelly (SDLP)/ (Independent) | Karina Carlin (Sinn Féin) | Paul Gallagher (Independent) |

== 2023 Election ==
2019: 2 x Sinn Féin, 2 x DUP, 2 x Independent, 1 x SDLP

2023: 3 x Sinn Féin, 1 x SDLP, 1 x DUP, 2 x Independent

2019–2023 Change: Sinn Féin gain from DUP

Sperrin - 7 seats
| Party | Candidate | FPv% | Count | | | | | | | | | |
| Party | Candidate | FPv% | 1 | 2 | 3 | 4 | 5 | 6 | 7 | 8 | 9 | 10 |
|---|---|---|---|---|---|---|---|---|---|---|---|---|
| Sinn Féin | Paul Boggs | 16.87% | 1,993 | | | | | | | | | |
| Sinn Féin | Fergal Leonard | 13.97% | 1,650 | | | | | | | | | |
| Sinn Féin | Brian Harte | 9.52% | 1,125 | 1,480.00 | | | | | | | | |
| SDLP | Jason Barr* ‡ | 6.87% | 811 | 847.75 | 896.35 | 924.09 | 953.92 | 1,019.53 | 1,174.93 | 1,208.93 | 1,569.93 | |
| Independent | Raymond Barr* | 8.35% | 985 | 1,014.75 | 1,024.11 | 1,053.11 | 1,110.65 | 1,157.02 | 1,206.45 | 1,217.45 | 1,345.06 | 1,414.91 |
| DUP | Allan Bresland* † | 10.11% | 1,194 | 1,194.00 | 1,194.00 | 1,198.00 | 1,200.00 | 1,208.00 | 1,217.18 | 1,401.18 | 1,412.43 | 1,412.98 |
| Independent | Paul Gallagher* | 8.82% | 1,042 | 1,065.50 | 1,072.52 | 1,079.52 | 1,129.17 | 1,164.41 | 1,194.95 | 1,198.95 | 1,277.64 | 1,297.00 |
| DUP | Maurice Devenney* | 8.16% | 964 | 964.00 | 964.18 | 967.18 | 967.43 | 968.43 | 973.43 | 1,201.43 | 1,206.43 | 1,208.08 |
| SDLP | Tommy Forbes | 4.55% | 538 | 559.50 | 596.58 | 613.71 | 634.50 | 689.86 | 787.75 | 810.93 | | |
| UUP | Glen Miller | 4.14% | 489 | 489.25 | 489.43 | 490.43 | 491.43 | 501.43 | 557.43 | | | |
| Alliance | Mel Boyle | 3.23% | 381 | 390.50 | 407.60 | 411.21 | 451.58 | 488.74 | | | | |
| Independent | Patsy Kelly | 2.08% | 246 | 256.75 | 284.83 | 294.73 | 312.09 | | | | | |
| People Before Profit | Carol Gallagher | 1.91% | 226 | 233.75 | 240.41 | 254.56 | | | | | | |
| Aontú | Darán Mac Meanman | 1.42% | 168 | 169.50 | 182.64 | | | | | | | |
Electorate: 19,143 Valid: 11,812 (61.70%) Spoilt: 183 Quota: 1,477 Turnout: 11,995 (62.66%)

== 2019 Election ==
2014: 3 x Sinn Féin, 2 x DUP, 1 x SDLP, 1 x Independent

2019: 2 x Sinn Féin, 2 x DUP, 2 x Independent, 1 x SDLP

2014-2019 Change: Independent gain from Sinn Féin

Sperrin - 7 seats
| Party | Candidate | FPv% | Count | | | | | | | | |
| Party | Candidate | FPv% | 1 | 2 | 3 | 4 | 5 | 6 | 7 | 8 | 9 |
|---|---|---|---|---|---|---|---|---|---|---|---|
| DUP | Allan Bresland* | 10.59% | 1,156 | 1,158 | 1,173 | 1,415 | | | | | |
| Sinn Féin | Michaela Boyle | 10.57% | 1,153 | 1,165 | 1,187 | 1,188 | 1,188 | 1,238 | 1,320 | 1,864 | |
| Sinn Féin | Dan Kelly* | 6.93% | 756 | 765 | 777 | 778 | 778 | 862 | 1,347 | 1,395 | |
| Independent | Paul Gallagher* | 10.14% | 1,106 | 1,123 | 1,148 | 1,151 | 1,151 | 1,225 | 1,230 | 1,278 | 1,340 |
| Independent | Raymond Barr | 8.43% | 920 | 943 | 983 | 993 | 993 | 1,099 | 1,105 | 1,183 | 1,287 |
| DUP | Maurice Devenney | 8.24% | 899 | 900 | 909 | 1,129 | 1,177.4 | 1,230.06 | 1,230.06 | 1,230.06 | 1,231.06 |
| SDLP | Jason Barr | 7.63% | 832 | 862 | 932 | 963 | 963 | 1,059 | 1,079 | 1,130 | 1,171 |
| SDLP | Steven Edwards | 7.28% | 794 | 822 | 885 | 914 | 914.22 | 1,029.22 | 1,064 | 1,095.22 | 1,112.22 |
| Sinn Féin | Brian McMahon* | 6.70% | 731 | 731 | 751 | 751 | 751 | 804 | 951 | | |
| Sinn Féin | Cathal Ó hOisín | 6.78% | 740 | 772 | 790 | 790 | 790 | 802 | | | |
| Independent | Patsy Kelly* | 5.45% | 595 | 624 | 692 | 734 | 734.66 | | | | |
| UUP | Andy McKane | 5.13% | 560 | 562 | 621 | | | | | | |
| Alliance | Scott Moore | 4.01% | 437 | 463 | | | | | | | |
| Independent | Pauline McHenry | 1.17% | 128 | | | | | | | | |
| Independent | Corey French | 0.95% | 104 | | | | | | | | |
Electorate: 18,048 Valid: 10,911 (60.46%) Spoilt: 176 Quota: 1,364 Turnout: 11,087 (61.43%)

== 2014 Election ==
2014: 3 x Sinn Féin, 2 x DUP, 1 x SDLP, 1 x Independent

Sperrin - 7 seats
| Party | Candidate | FPv% | Count | | | | | | | |
| Party | Candidate | FPv% | 1 | 2 | 3 | 4 | 5 | 6 | 7 | 8 |
|---|---|---|---|---|---|---|---|---|---|---|
| DUP | Allan Bresland* | 11.70% | 1,179 | 1,179 | 1,443 | | | | | |
| DUP | Rhonda Hamilton* | 9.57% | 965 | 965 | 1,233 | 1,408 | | | | |
| SDLP | Patsy Kelly* ‡ | 8.10% | 816 | 872 | 893 | 894.4 | 923.1 | 1,279.1 | | |
| Sinn Féin | Karina Carlin* | 11.60% | 1,169 | 1,178 | 1,178 | 1,178 | 1,178 | 1,213 | 1,215 | 1,285 |
| Independent | Paul Gallagher | 9.70% | 978 | 997 | 998 | 998 | 1,001.5 | 1,026.9 | 1,028.6 | 1,203.5 |
| Sinn Féin | Brian McMahon* | 9.58% | 966 | 974 | 974 | 974 | 974 | 999 | 1,000.2 | 1,138.2 |
| Sinn Féin | Dan Kelly* | 10.07% | 1,015 | 1,022 | 1,022 | 1,022 | 1,022.7 | 1,048.7 | 1,049.9 | 1,111.5 |
| Sinn Féin | Diarmuid Ward | 9.62% | 970 | 976 | 976 | 976 | 976 | 998.7 | 1,002.1 | 1,023.1 |
| Independent | Eugene McMenamin* | 6.85% | 690 | 699 | 718 | 719.4 | 746.7 | 819.1 | 826.5 | |
| SDLP | Patrick Leonard | 5.55% | 559 | 623 | 626 | 628.8 | 638.6 | | | |
| UUP | William Jamieson | 5.83% | 588 | 589 | | | | | | |
| SDLP | Liam Stewart | 1.84% | 185 | | | | | | | |
Electorate: 17,214 Valid: 10,080 (58.56%) Spoilt: 183 Quota: 1,261 Turnout: 10,263 (59.62%)
