= 1977 Strabane District Council election =

Local govt election in Northern Ireland

← 1973	18 May 1977	1981 →

All 15 seats to Strabane District Council 8 seats needed for a majority
	First party	Second party	Third party
Party	SDLP	UUP	Ind. Nationalist
Seats won	5	5	3
Seat change	▲1	▼1	▲1
	Fourth party	Fifth party	Sixth party
Party	DUP	Alliance	United Loyalist Coalition
Seats won	2	0	0
Seat change	▲2	▼2	▼1

Elections to Strabane District Council were held on 18 May 1977 on the same day as the other Northern Irish local government elections. The election used three district electoral areas to elect a total of 15 councillors.

== Election results ==
Strabane District Council Election Result 1977
Party	Seats	Gains	Losses	Net gain/loss	Seats %	Votes %	Votes	+/−
SDLP	5	1	0	▲1	33.3	30.5	5,139	▲4.3
UUP	5	0	1	▼1	33.3	29.5	4,967	▼9.4
Ind. Nationalist	3	1	0	▲1	20.0	14.9	2,505	▲3.8
DUP	2	2	0	▲2	13.3	13.6	2,284	New
Independent	0	0	0	0	0.0	5.1	852	▲2.6
Alliance	0	0	2	▼2	0.0	5.0	510	▼6.6
Republican Clubs	0	0	0	0	0.0	2.3	384	▼1.6
Ind. Unionist	0	0	0	0	0.0	1.2	205	▲1.2

Note: "Votes" are the first preference votes.

== Districts summary ==
Results of the Strabane District Council election, 1977 by district
Ward	%	Cllrs	%	Cllrs	%	Cllrs	%	Cllrs	Total Cllrs
Ward	SDLP		UUP		DUP		Others		Total Cllrs
Area A	14.3	1	35.9	2	18.2	1	31.6	1	5
Area B	27.4	1	34.8	2	22.0	1	15.8	1	5
Area C	50.9	3	17.2	1	0.0	0	31.9	1	5
Total	30.5	5	29.5	5	13.6	2	26.4	3	15

== Districts results ==
=== Area A ===
1973: 3 x UUP, 1 x SDLP, 1 x Independent Nationalist
1977: 2 x UUP, 1 x SDLP, 1 x DUP, 1 x Independent Nationalist
1973-1977 Change: DUP gain from UUP

Strabane Area A - 5 seats
Party	Candidate	FPv%	Count						
Party	Candidate	FPv%	1	2	3	4	5	6	7
DUP	George McIntyre	18.18%	1,047						
Ind. Nationalist	Denis McCrory*	17.53%	1,010						
SDLP	Daniel Gallagher*	8.99%	518	518	542	556	764	1,002	
UUP	Edward Turner	13.16%	758	789.04	798.2	864.32	865.32	871.4	875.4
UUP	Ernest Young*	12.40%	714	731.04	750.04	791.28	794.28	795.28	807.28
UUP	Frank Stewart	10.36%	597	611.24	623.32	708.44	710.44	721.52	736.52
Independent	Brian MacBride	7.99%	460	460.08	493.16	500.24	571.24		
SDLP	Mary McCrea	5.28%	304	304	311	313.08			
Ind. Unionist	James Moore	3.56%	205	219.56	244.56				
Alliance	James Smyth	2.55%	147	147.4					
Electorate: 7,693 Valid: 5,760 (74.87%) Spoilt: 266 Quota: 961 Turnout: 6,026 (78.33%)

=== Area B ===
1973: 2 x UUP, 1 x SDLP, 1 x Alliance, 1 x United Loyalist Coalition
1977: 2 x UUP, 1 x SDLP, 1 x DUP, 1 x Independent Nationalist
1973-1977 Change: Independent Nationalist gain from Alliance, United Loyalist Coalition joins DUP

Strabane Area B - 5 seats
Party	Candidate	FPv%	Count			
Party	Candidate	FPv%	1	2	3	4
DUP	Samuel Rogers*	21.96%	1,237			
UUP	Mary Britton*	19.83%	1,117			
SDLP	John Gallagher	17.84%	1,005			
UUP	Henry Henderson*	14.95%	842	1,128		
Ind. Nationalist	Francis McConnell	12.52%	705	705.25	749.25	855.25
SDLP	Aidan McNamee	9.55%	538	538.25	548.25	595.5
Independent	James McCormick	2.89%	163	163	205	
Independent	James Tinney	0.46%	26	27	30	
Electorate: 7,110 Valid: 5,633 (79.23%) Spoilt: 214 Quota: 939 Turnout: 5,847 (82.24%)

=== Area C ===
1973: 2 x SDLP, 1 x UUP, 1 x Alliance, 1 x Independent Nationalist
1977: 3 x SDLP, 1 x UUP, 1 x Independent Nationalist
1973-1977 Change: SDLP gain from Alliance

Strabane Area C - 5 seats
Party	Candidate	FPv%	Count								
Party	Candidate	FPv%	1	2	3	4	5	6	7	8	9
SDLP	Ivan Cooper	26.72%	1,457								
SDLP	William Carlin*	14.69%	801	1,077.12							
SDLP	John McKelvey*	9.46%	516	683.31	816.75	822.14	834.72	858.69	918.69		
UUP	Robert Fleming	10.67%	582	583.17	583.65	585.04	585.04	586.04	589.04	914.04	
Ind. Nationalist	John O'Kane*	10.86%	592	623.2	631.36	635.36	666.48	692.76	768.84	772.84	913.84
Republican Clubs	Ivan Barr	5.81%	317	332.21	337.01	337.4	393.57	416.74	443.24	444.24	471.26
Alliance	Douglas Cooper*	5.72%	312	323.7	326.34	362.36	365.92	380.79	392.35	406.35	
UUP	Sydney Browne	6.55%	357	357.39	357.39	358.39	358.39	358.39	358.39		
Ind. Nationalist	John McCrory	3.63%	198	208.14	214.14	214.14	222.53	241.4			
Independent	Thomas Forbes	2.68%	146	160.04	166.76	168.39	173.56				
Republican Clubs	Gerard McCafferty	1.22%	67	71.68	72.4	74.4					
Independent	James McDaid	1.05%	57	63.63	64.83	64.83					
Alliance	Mamie Quigley	0.94%	51	54.51	55.47						
Electorate: 7,754 Valid: 5,453 (70.32%) Spoilt: 317 Quota: 909 Turnout: 5,770 (74.41%)
