= 1981 Strabane District Council election =

Local govt election in Northern Ireland

← 1977	20 May 1981	1985 →

All 15 seats to Strabane District Council 8 seats needed for a majority
	First party	Second party	Third party
Party	SDLP	DUP	Ind. Nationalist
Seats won	4	4	4
Seat change	▼1	▲2	▲1
	Fourth party
Party	UUP
Seats won	3
Seat change	▼2

Elections to Strabane District Council were held on 20 May 1981 on the same day as the other Northern Irish local government elections. The election used three district electoral areas to elect a total of 15 councillors.

== Election results ==
Strabane District Council Election Result 1981
Party	Seats	Gains	Losses	Net gain/loss	Seats %	Votes %	Votes	+/−
Ind. Nationalist	4	1	0	▲1	26.7	26.1	4,459	▲11.2
DUP	4	2	0	▲2	26.7	25.1	4,287	▲11.5
SDLP	4	0	1	▼1	26.7	22.8	3,889	▼7.7
UUP	3	0	2	▼1	20.0	20.7	3,545	▼8.8
Independent	0	0	0	0	0.0	1.9	326	▼3.0
Anti H-Block	0	0	0	0	0.0	1.7	296	New
Alliance	0	0	0	0	0.0	1.7	288	▼1.3

Note: "Votes" are the first preference votes.

== Districts summary ==
Results of the Strabane District Council election, 1981 by district
Ward	%	Cllrs	%	Cllrs	%	Cllrs	%	Cllrs	Total Cllrs
Ward	DUP		SDLP		UUP		Others		Total Cllrs
Area A	35.4	2	17.2	1	25.2	1	22.2	1	5
Area B	30.9	2	24.3	1	27.3	1	17.5	1	5
Area C	7.0	0	27.3	2	8.5	1	57.2	2	5
Total	25.1	4	22.8	4	20.7	3	31.4	4	15

== Districts results ==
=== Area A ===
1977: 2 x UUP, 1 x DUP, 1 x SDLP, 1 x Independent Nationalist
1981: 2 x DUP, 1 x UUP, 1 x SDLP, 1 x Independent Nationalist
1977-1981 Change: DUP gain from UUP

Strabane Area A - 5 seats
Party	Candidate	FPv%	Count			
Party	Candidate	FPv%	1	2	3	4
Ind. Nationalist	Denis McCrory*	22.11%	1,320			
DUP	Thomas Kerrigan	20.46%	1,221			
SDLP	Mary McCrea	17.24%	1,029			
DUP	Robert Anderson	9.72%	580	581	602.6	1,070.22
UUP	Edward Turner*	13.94%	832	882	892.26	908.42
UUP	Ernest Young*	11.26%	672	738	747.36	754.62
DUP	David Baird	5.28%	315	321	497.22	
Electorate: 7,833 Valid: 5,969 (76.20%) Spoilt: 193 Quota: 995 Turnout: 6,162 (78.67%)

=== Area B ===
1977: 2 x UUP, 1 x DUP, 1 x SDLP, 1 x Independent Nationalist
1981: 2 x DUP, 1 x UUP, 1 x SDLP, 1 x Independent Nationalist
1977-1981 Change: DUP gain from UUP

Strabane Area B - 5 seats
Party	Candidate	FPv%	Count	
Party	Candidate	FPv%	1	2
SDLP	John Gallagher*	18.92%	1,101	
Ind. Nationalist	Francis McConnell*	17.44%	1,015	
UUP	Mary Britton*	16.91%	984	
DUP	Samuel Rogers*	16.72%	973	
DUP	George McIntyre*	14.21%	827	832
UUP	Henry Henderson*	10.43%	607	624
SDLP	Mary McAleer	5.38%	313	
Electorate: 7,050 Valid: 5,820 (82.55%) Spoilt: 177 Quota: 971 Turnout: 5,997 (85.06%)

=== Area C ===
1977: 3 x SDLP, 1 x UUP, 1 x Independent Nationalist
1981: 2 x SDLP, 2 x Independent Nationalist, 1 x UUP
1977-1981 Change: Independent Nationalist gain from SDLP

Strabane Area C - 5 seats
Party	Candidate	FPv%	Count										
Party	Candidate	FPv%	1	2	3	4	5	6	7	8	9	10	11
Ind. Nationalist	James O'Kane	27.52%	1,459										
Ind. Nationalist	John O'Kane*	7.89%	418	818.98	826.8	836.62	857.54	890.18					
SDLP	Paul O'Hare	11.32%	600	659.45	666.27	670.27	682.91	688.32	836.83	902.83			
SDLP	William Flanagan	10.90%	578	599.73	601.14	605.14	610.55	619.78	727.29	790.16	807.96	886.96	
UUP	Robert Fleming*	8.49%	450	450.82	451.82	467.23	472.23	473.23	473.23	475.64	475.94	555.35	562.35
DUP	Desmond Monteith	7.00%	371	371.41	371.41	377.41	385.41	394.41	394.41	394.41	394.41	397.41	399.41
Anti H-Block	William Gallagher	5.58%	296	305.84	313.84	313.84	315.84	331.25	333.25	382.89	385.49	385.49	
Alliance	Patrick Wallace	5.43%	288	304.4	308.81	319.22	339.86	343.86	349.09	370.14	374.04		
Ind. Nationalist	John McCrory	4.66%	247	264.63	272.04	276.04	289.09	303.91	312.32				
SDLP	Jane O'Donnell	5.06%	268	280.3	280.71	281.71	288.94	294.94					
Independent	Michael Dunne	2.17%	115	119.92	123.92	131.92	131.92						
Independent	David Fleming	1.81%	96	108.71	109.71	110.71							
Independent	William Crichton	1.36%	72	73.64	73.64								
Independent	John Tracey	0.81%	43	46.28									
Electorate: 7,630 Valid: 5,301 (69.48%) Spoilt: 146 Quota: 884 Turnout: 5,447 (71.39%)
