= Strabane District Council =

Coordinates: 54°30′0″N 7°16′12″W

Strabane District
- Area: 862 km^{2} (333 sq mi); Ranked 4th of 26
- District HQ: Strabane
- Catholic: 64.9%
- Protestant: 33.7%
- Country: Northern Ireland
- Sovereign state: United Kingdom
- Councillors: MLAs West Tyrone Sinn Féin: 3 DUP: 1 SDLP: 1; MPs Órfhlaith Begley (Sinn Féin)
- Website: www.strabanedc.org.uk

Strabane District Council (Irish: Comhairle Ceantair an tSratha Báin; Ulster-Scots: Stràbane Destrìck Cooncil) was a local council in County Tyrone, Northern Ireland established by the Local Government Act (Northern Ireland) 1972. It merged with Derry City Council on 1 April 2015 under local government reorganisation in Northern Ireland to become Derry and Strabane District Council.

The headquarters of the council was in the town of Strabane. Apart from Strabane the other smaller towns in the area included Plumbridge, Newtownstewart, Donemana, Sion Mills and Castlederg. Also included in the Strabane District Council area were the following rural areas: Glenmornan, Evish, Glebe, Artigarvan, and Ballymagorry.

The Strabane District Council area consisted of three electoral areas, Derg, Glenelly and Mourne, from which 16 members were elected. At the final elections in 2011 members were elected from the following political parties: 8 Sinn Féin, 4 Democratic Unionist Party (DUP), 1 Social Democratic and Labour Party (SDLP), 1 Ulster Unionist Party (UUP) and 2 Independent Nationalist.

== 2011 election results ==
Map of the district's DEAs from 1993 to 2014

Party		seats	change +/-
•	Sinn Féin	8	+1
•	Democratic Unionist Party	4	=
•	Ulster Unionist Party	1	=
•	Social Democratic and Labour Party	1	-1
•	Independent	1	+1

== Rates ==
On 12 February 2008, Strabane District Council stuck the district rate for 2008–09. The new domestic district rate became £3.1274 per thousand capital value, an increase of 6.47%. The new non-domestic district rate became 21.282p in the pound, an increase of 6.47%.

== Review of Public Administration ==
Under the Review of Public Administration (RPA) the council was due to merge with Derry City Council in 2011 to form a single council for the enlarged area totalling 1303 km^{2} and a population of 143,314. The next election was due to take place in May 2009, but on 25 April 2008, Shaun Woodward, Secretary of State for Northern Ireland announced that the scheduled 2009 district council elections were to be postponed until the introduction of the eleven new councils in 2011. These were then further postponed. Strabane Council merged with Derry City Council to form the new Derry City and Strabane District Council on 1 April 2015. The first elections for the new council took place in May 2014.

== Population ==
The area covered by Strabane District Council had a population of 39,843 residents according to the 2011 Northern Ireland census.

== Twinning ==
Strabane was twinned with Zeulenroda in Thuringia in Germany.

== See also ==
- Local government in Northern Ireland
